= Music of Virginia =

Virginia's musical contribution to American culture includes Piedmont blues, jazz, folk, brass, hip-hop, and rock and roll bands, as well as the founding origins of country music in the Bristol sessions by Appalachian Virginians.

Within the state, origin points for music ranges from cities such as Richmond to college towns such as Charlottesville and Fredericksburg, and the rural areas of Southwestern Virginia along "The Crooked Road."

== State song ==
"Carry Me Back to Old Virginny" by James A. Bland was Virginia's state song from 1940 until 1997; it now has emeritus status. "Oh Shenandoah" was the interim state song from January 2006, and its melody was used for "Our Great Virginia," with lyrics by Mike Greenly, which became the official state song in 2015. The same year, "Sweet Virginia Breeze," written in 1978 by Steve Bassett and Robbin Thompson, became the official popular state song; the runner-up was "Virginia, the Home of My Heart."

== Birthplace of Southern shape note music ==
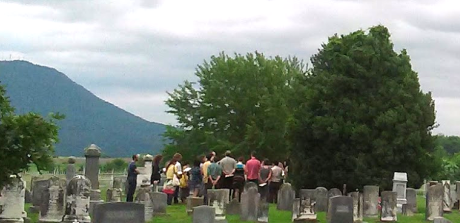
Singing Davisson's "Retirement" at his graveside in Cross Keys, following an all-day singing from the Shenandoah Harmony (June 7, 2015).

In 1816, Ananias Davisson of Rockingham County published a shape note tunebook, titled Kentucky Harmony, containing folk melodies collected during his travels. At a time when the musicians in the North were turning to Europe and ridiculing the composers of the First New England School, Davisson's focus on grassroots regional music was widely imitated in the South.

== Notable music artists from Virginia by genre ==
One of Virginia's most famous musical contributions is the country singer Patsy Cline. Several towns claim her as their own, including Gore and Winchester. Pearl Bailey and the "First Lady of Jazz" Ella Fitzgerald both hail from Newport News.

Virginia's notable award-winning bluegrass and country musicians include Jim & Jesse McReynolds and the Virginia Boys, Ralph Stanley, Hobart Smith, the Statler Brothers, and the Carter Family. Hip hop and rhythm and blues acts like Missy Elliott, Timbaland, the Neptunes, Clipse, Nottz, and Bink also hail from the commonwealth.

Singer-songwriters from Virginia include Jason Mraz and jam bands like the Pat McGee Band and Dave Matthews Band, who continue their strong charitable connection to Charlottesville.

=== Hip hop ===
- Bink! - record producer/songwriter, Norfolk
- Chris Brown – Hip-hop and R&B singer, Tappahannock
- Clipse (No Malice and Pusha T) – rap/hip-hop duo, Virginia Beach
- Black Cobain — rapper, Alexandria
- Danja – record producer/songwriter, Virginia Beach
- D'Angelo – R&B singer, Richmond
- Dalvin DeGrate – singer, member of Jodeci, Hampton
- DC Talk - Christian rap, Lynchberg
- Missy Elliott – hip-hop and R&B singer "the Queen of Rap," Portsmouth
- Black Kray (Sickboyrari) - rapper, Richmond
- Krohme - record producer/songwriter, Alexandria
- Lex Luger – producer, Suffolk
- Lee Major – Music Producer/Songwriter, Petersburg
- Nick Mira – producer and songwriter, Richmond
- The Neptunes (Pharrell and Chad Hugo) – hip hop, R&B, and pop producer/artist duo
- N.E.R.D (Pharrell, Chad Hugo, and Shay Haley) – rock, funk, and hip hop band
- Nettspend - rapper, Richmond
- Nickelus F – rapper, Richmond
- Nottz – producer and rapper, Norfolk
- Big Pooh – rapper (Little Brother), Dumfries
- Lady Of Rage – rapper, Farmville
- Skillz – rapper and songwriter, Richmond
- Trey Songz – R&B singer, Petersburg
- Eric Stanley – violinist and composer, Chesapeake
- DeVante Swing – producer/singer, founder of R&B group Jodeci, Hampton
- Pusha T – rapper and songwriter, Virginia Beach
- Timbaland – rapper and producer, Norfolk.
- Lil Ugly Mane – rapper, singer, noise musician, and record producer, Richmond
- Pharrell Williams – producer, rapper, singer-songwriter, Virginia Beach
- yvngxchris – rapper, singer, songwriter, Chesapeake

=== Blues and jazz ===
- Pearl Mae Bailey – vocalist, actress, Newport News
- James "Plunky" Branch – saxophonist; Oneness of JuJu, Ornette Coleman, Sun Ra, Richmond
- Karen Briggs – improvising violinist (featured with Yanni), Portsmouth
- Rob Brown – saxophonist and composer, Hampton
- Ruth Brown – singer, songwriter, actress, musician, Portsmouth
- Charlie Byrd – jazz guitarist, Suffolk
- Robert Cray – blues guitarist, Newport News
- Walter Davis Jr. – bebop and hard bop pianist, Richmond
- Archie Edwards – Piedmont blues guitarist, Union Hall
- Ella Fitzgerald – jazz singer, Newport News
- Tiny Grimes – jazz and R&B guitarist, Newport News
- The Holmes Brothers – blues, jazz, gospel, Christchurch
- Claude Hopkins – jazz stride pianist, Alexandria
- Cliff Jackson – jazz stride pianist, Culpeper
- John Jackson – Piedmont blues musician, Woodville
- René Marie – vocalist, Warrenton
- Tommy Newsom – musician in Johnny Carson's The Tonight Show Band, Portsmouth
- Don Pullen – avant-garde jazz pianist, Roanoke
- Keely Smith – jazz singer, actress, Louis Prima collaborator, Norfolk
- Lonnie Liston Smith – pianist, keyboardist; Pharoah Sanders, Miles Davis, Stanley Turrentine, Rahsaan Roland Kirk, Betty Carter, Max Roach, Richmond
- Steve Wilson – saxophonist; Chick Corea, Dave Holland, Lionel Hampton, Hampton
- Victor Wooten – bass virtuoso, member of Béla Fleck and the Flecktones, Newport News

=== Country and bluegrass ===
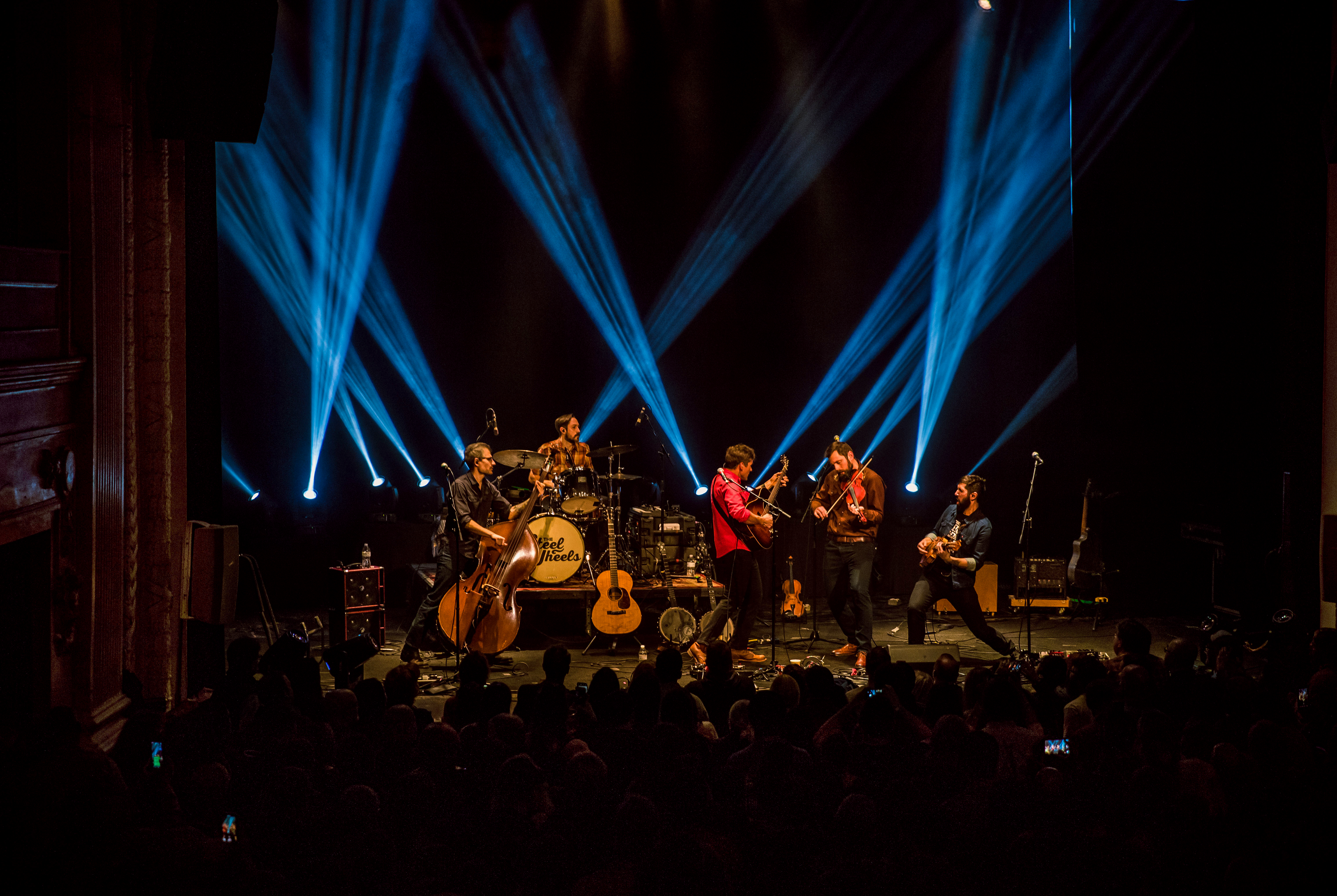
The Steel Wheels play at the Jefferson Theater in Charlottesville

- Kenny Alphin – of the country group Big & Rich, b. Culpeper
- Oliver Anthony - singer-songwriter, Farmville
- Tim Barry – frontman of Avail, and country/folk singer-songwriter, Richmond
- Dock Boggs – singer, banjo player, Norton
- The Carter Family – country trio, known as the "First Family of Country Music," Maces Spring
- Neko Case – country singer, Alexandria
- Roy Clark – country music artist, Meherrin
- Patsy Cline – country music singer, Winchester (d. 1963, buried in Winchester)
- Steve Earle – country-rock musician and songwriter, b. Hampton
- Jim & Jesse – bluegrass duo, Coeburn
- Scott Miller – alternative country singer-songwriter, also of the V-Roys and Scott Miller & the Commonwealth, Augusta County
- Old Crow Medicine Show – Americana/folk band, Harrisonburg
- Old Dominion – country band, Roanoke
- River City Gang – country-rock band, Richmond
- Gary Ruley and Mule Train – Rockbridge County
- Shaboozey- singer, Prince William County
- Mary Simpson – violinist, Charlottesville
- Canaan Smith – country singer, Williamsburg
- Hobart Smith – banjo virtuoso, Saltville
- Kilby Snow – autoharpist, Grayson County
- The Stanley Brothers – bluegrass duo, Dickenson County
- The Statler Brothers – country-rock-gospel band, Staunton
- The Steel Wheels - folk and Americana, Harrisonburg
- Ricky Van Shelton – country singer, Pittsylvania County
- Phil Vassar – country singer and songwriter, Lynchburg
- Walker's Run, Lexington
- Wade Ward – banjo player, fiddler, Independence
- Mac Wiseman, born in Crimora

=== Pop, rock, and heavy metal ===
- Illiterate Light – indie rock duo, Harrisonburg and Richmond
- Alabama Thunderpussy – mainstream rock-metal band, Richmond
- Arsis – death metal band, Virginia Beach
- Artful Dodger – power pop, Fairfax
- Avail – punk band, Richmond
- Bad Omens - heavy metal band, Richmond
- Broadside – pop-punk band, Richmond
- Carbon Leaf – Celtic-infused rock band, Richmond
- Car Seat Headrest - indie rock band, Leesburg
- City of Caterpillar – screamo/post rock band, Richmond
- Clarence Clemons – saxophonist for Bruce Springsteen's E Street Band, Norfolk
- Stewart Copeland – drummer for rock band the Police and jazz ensemble Animal Logic, Alexandria
- Lucy Dacus – singer-songwriter and member of indie trio boygenius, Mechanicsville
- Dave Matthews Band – jam band, Charlottesville
- Days Difference – pop-rock band, Virginia Beach
- The Dreamscapes Project – acoustic rock band, Reston
- The Downtown Fiction – rock band, Fairfax
- Mark Oliver Everett – lead singer, guitarist, and keyboardist of Eels
- Neil Fallon – stoner rock, singer for the band Clutch
- The Friday Night Boys – rock band, Fairfax
- Glass Cloud – metalcore Hampton
- Down To Nothing – hardcore punk band, Richmond
- Eternal Summers – dream pop band, Roanoke
- Gigantic Brain – experimental metal-grindcore band
- Gwar – thrash metal, art rock band, Richmond
- The Last Bison – indie-folk band, Chesapeake
- Labradford – ambient/drone/post-rock band, Richmond
- Lamb of God – heavy-metal band, Richmond
- Jake E. Lee – heavy/glam metal guitarist, Ratt, Dio, Ozzy Osbourne, Mandy Lion
- Bill Leverty – guitarist for Firehouse, Richmond
- Michael Foster— drummer for Firehouse, Richmond
- Mae – pop-rock, Norfolk
- Aimee Mann – new wave singer-songwriter, Richmond
- Janis Martin – rockabilly, country, rock and roll, Sutherlin
- Moutheater – noise rock/sludge/punk, Norfolk
- Jason Mraz – acoustic pop-rock singer-songwriter, Mechanicsville
- Municipal Waste – Thrash Crossover band, Richmond
- Bob Nastanovich - percussionist, member of indie rock band Pavement, Midlothian
- Parachute – indie-rock band, Charlottesville
- Pentagram (band) - doom metal, Alexandria
- Pg. 99 - screamo/emoviolence band, Sterling
- Pig Destroyer – grindcore band, Alexandria
- RDGLDGRN, rap-rock, Reston
- Satan's Satyrs, heavy/doom/punk rock, Herndon (later Richmond)
- Suzy Saxon and the Anglos – new wave band, Richmond
- Seven Mary Three – alternative rock, post-grunge band, Williamsburg
- Matt Sharp – original Weezer bass guitarist, the Rentals, grew up in Arlington
- Strike Anywhere – punk rock/melodic hardcore band, Richmond
- Scott Travis – heavy metal drummer for Judas Priest, Norfolk
- Tim Be Told – contemporary Christian-rock band, Charlottesville
- Kali Uchis – singer-songwriter, Alexandria
- Gene Vincent - rockabilly singer and guitarist, Norfolk
- Steve West - drummer for indie rock band Pavement, Richmond
- Windhand – Doom Metal band, Richmond
- Jason Richardson (musician) - guitarist, former member of All Shall Perish, Chelsea Grin, and Born of Osiris; current member of All That Remains, Manassas

=== Other ===
- Pearl Bailey – Broadway singer, Newport News
- Ann Marie Calhoun – violinist, Gordonsville
- Bill Deal and the Rhondels are from Virginia Beach
- Hilary Hahn – classical violin soloist, Lexington
- Bruce Hornsby – singer-songwriter and pianist, Williamsburg
- Undine Smith Moore – composer, Jarratt
- Wayne Newton – a.k.a. "Mr. Las Vegas"; singer and songwriter, Roanoke
- Ketch Secor and Critter Fuqua of Old Crow Medicine Show, Harrisonburg
- Pelt - drone group, Richmond
- Robbin Thompson – singer-songwriter, Richmond
- Keller Williams – one-man jam band from Fredericksburg

== Music venues and institutions ==
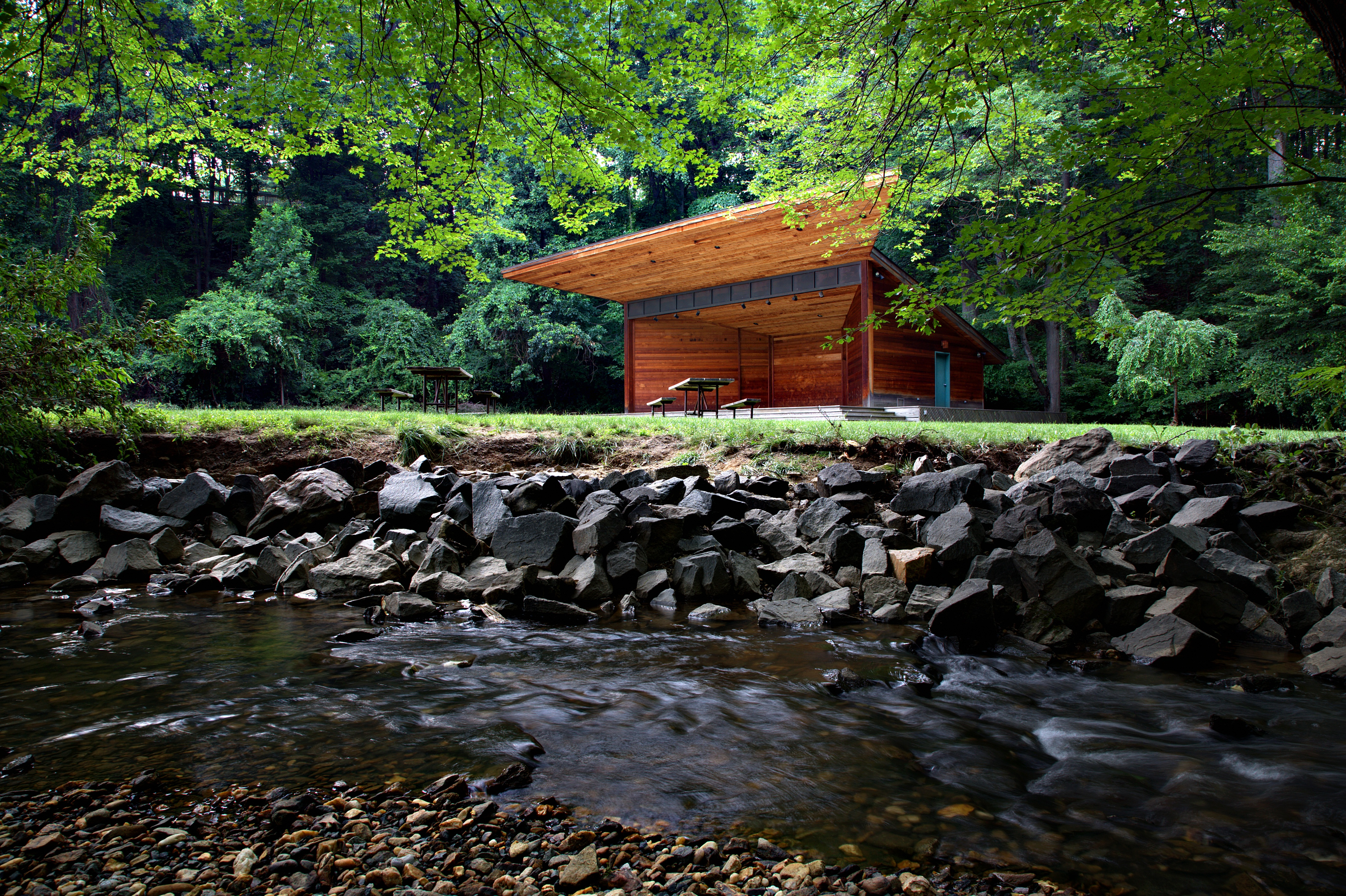
The Meadow Pavilion is one of the theaters at Wolf Trap National Park for the Performing Arts.

For larger concerts and events, Virginia has the Ferguson Center for the Arts (Christopher Newport University) in Newport News, VA; Jiffy Lube Live in Bristow (marketed as D.C. for most tours); the Veterans United Home Loans Amphitheater at Virginia Beach in Virginia Beach; the Richmond Coliseum; the Hampton Coliseum; and the Norfolk Scope. Vienna is home to the Wolf Trap National Park for the Performing Arts, the only national park for the arts in the United States. Wolf Trap features a large outdoor amphitheater, the 7,000-seat Filene Center, and a smaller indoor venue called The Barns. The Old Dominion Opry is another major venue, located near Colonial Williamsburg, a popular tourist attraction.

Virginia's other prominent music venues include The Birchmere in Alexandria, a local country and bluegrass club where Mary Chapin Carpenter performed early in her career. The Landmark Theater in Richmond and the Harrison Opera House in Norfolk both host the Virginia Opera. Phase 2 (the former Cattle Annie's, but significantly remodeled in 2010) is a popular, large club venue in Lynchburg with a reputation for attracting prominent performers. Garth Newel Music Center in Hot Springs was once a farm that is now known for classical, jazz, and blues concerts with gourmet meals and views from the side of Warm Springs Mountain. The Shenandoah Valley Music Festival celebrated its 50th anniversary of summer concerts in 2013 and continues to draw people to the tiny Shenandoah County village of Orkney Springs.

Richmond's 929 West Grace Street has housed a punk- and rock-oriented club for nearly three decades. Most famously known as Twisters throughout the 1990s, the building has more recently been known as Club 929, The Nanci Raygun, and Bagel Czar before reopening in 2009 as Strange Matter. Like its predecessors, Strange Matter hosts up-and-coming local and national touring acts nearly every night. Alley Katz in Richmond continues to have regular shows. Toad's Place accommodated mid-sized bands in 2007 and 2008 but closed shortly after. Another mid-sized venue is The National, which holds around 1,500 people.

The Hampton Roads area also has several more intimate venues. The most prominent of them is the Norva Theatre, a small, club-style venue for small- to mid-size acts.

The Shenandoah Valley hosts a few smaller venues. The Mockingbird in downtown Staunton was a 168-seat, newly renovated grassroots and acoustic music hall that closed early in 2013. The Clementine café in downtown Harrisonburg has cemented itself as the premier venue in the valley.

In the late 1960s and the 1970s, the Alexandria Roller Rink hosted many festival-style concerts, among which bands like Yes, Jethro Tull, and many others appeared.

The Virginia Musical Museum & Virginia Music Hall of Fame in Williamsburg, Virginia, opened in 2013. The museum and hall of fame display instruments, memorabilia, pictures, and the history of Virginia music artists. New Virginia artists are inducted into the Virginia Music Hall of Fame each year.

== Music festivals ==
FloydFest is a popular music and arts festival held in Patrick County, next to Floyd County. The festival began in 2002 and features camping and a wide range of music, from bluegrass to rock, reggae, folk, zydeco, and Appalachian.

In 2005, 2006, and 2007, Richmond hosted the National Folk Festival, featuring regional folk music from the Virginia area as well as folk musicians from around the world. After the NFF moved on to its next site, the city continued hosting annual events as the Richmond Folk Festival.

The Virginia Blues & Jazz Festival was started in 2006 at the Garth Newel Music Center in Hot Springs. It is held each June and has featured national acts like Taj Mahal, the Dirty Dozen Brass Band, Buckwheat Zydeco, and Eric Lindell.

The MACRoCk festival happens at the beginning of April every year in Harrisonburg, VA. It has featured national acts like mewithoutYou, Q and Not U, Fugazi, The Faint, Archers of Loaf, Dismemberment Plan, Sufjan Stevens, Prefuse 73, Mates of State, the Wrens, Converge, Antibalas Afrobeat Orchestra, of Montreal, Norma Jean, the Dillinger Escape Plan, Superchunk, Elliott Smith, An Albatross, Coheed and Cambria, Avail, and Engine Down.

The Blue Ridge Rock Festival, a Hard Rock/Heavy Metal music festival, was held in Virginia annually from 2017 to 2023. The festival was held at DeVault Vineyards in Concord, VA, in 2017 and 2018; at Oak Ridge in Arrington, VA, in 2019; at White Oak Mountain Amphitheater in Blairs, VA, in 2021; and at Virginia International Raceway (VIR) in Alton, VA, in 2022. It was held at VIR again in 2023; however, the festival was canceled after just two days. Gwar from Richmond played at Blue Ridge Rock Festival in 2022. Lamb of God from Richmond played at Blue Ridge Rock Festival in 2018, 2021, and 2022.

=== Blue Ridge mountain music ===
Southwest Virginia is, along with western North Carolina, part of the Blue Ridge area, home to a distinctive style of old-time music sometimes called "mountain music," which is a tradition most famously celebrated through an annual series of festivals. Galax is a small town that is home to the Old Fiddlers' Convention, which has been held since 1935; it is the largest and oldest festival of old-time Appalachian music in the country. The convention has given Galax the nickname "Capital of Old-Time Mountain Music". The Convention attracts upwards of 20,000 visitors to witness many of the most renowned American folk, country, and bluegrass performers, as well as regional stars. Galax and the surrounding area have long been a part of American and Virginian music and are known for an intricate fiddling style and instrumental and vocal traditions; music collectors like Peter Seeger and Alan Lomax visited Galax and recorded the region's music.

Though the Galax Old Fiddlers' Convention is a major focal point for the Blue Ridge's vibrant folk music scene, the region is home to a major music festival season, which is inaugurated by the late March Fairview Ruritan Club Fiddlers' Convention, which hosts a major regional competition in several categories. Ferrum College in Ferrum is home to the annual Blue Ridge Folklife Festival, which has been held every October since 1973. The White Top Mountain–Mount Rogers area is home to the Wayne Henderson Music Festival & Guitar Competition, as well as some regional festivals, with mountain music as a major part of the White Top Mountain Molasses Festival, the White Top Mountain Maple Festival, and the White Top Mountain Ramp Festival. The aforementioned FloydFest always features bluegrass and traditional Appalachian mountain music. Local mountain music festivals in Virginia abound in small towns like Fries, Wytheville, Troutdale, Vesta, Stuart, Bassett, Baywood and Elk Creek, as well as at the Grayson Highlands State Park near Mouth of Wilson.

Farther southwest, the Carter Family Fold, in the Carter Family hometown of Hiltons, hosts an annual folk music festival as well as weekly concerts. Johnny Cash often visited the Hiltons area and The Fold with his wife, June Carter Cash. In fact, Johnny Cash's last public performance was at The Fold in the summer of 2003. The area around the Virginia and Kentucky border, folk, country, and bluegrass, remains a vital regional tradition. Norton is home to the Virginia Kentucky Opry and a historic music venue called the Country Cabin. At the same time, local festivals include the Doc Boggs Festival (in Wise) and Ralph Stanley's Annual Memorial Weekend Bluegrass Festival.

== Country music ==
Virginia's contributions to country music include the legendary singer Patsy Cline, pioneering performers the Carter Family, and Staunton's Statler Brothers, who were among the most popular country acts in the 1970s and 1980s.

Bristol, TN/VA, has been designated by Congress as the 'Birthplace of Country Music.' In 1927, record producer Ralph Peer of Victor Records began recording local musicians in Bristol to capture the region's traditional "folk" sound. One of these local sounds was created by the Carter Family, which got its start on July 31, 1927, when A.P. Carter and his family journeyed from Maces Spring, Virginia, to Bristol to audition for Ralph Peer, who was seeking new talent for the relatively embryonic recording industry. They received $50 for each song they recorded. That same visit by Peer to Bristol also resulted in the first recordings by Jimmie Rodgers. These 1927 sessions became known as the Big Bang of Country Music. Since 1994, the Birthplace of Country Music Alliance has promoted the city as a destination for learning about country music and its role in the genre's creation. Currently, the Alliance is organizing the building of a new cultural heritage center to help educate the public about the history of country music in the region.

The Bristol Rhythm & Roots Reunion is held every September on State Street in Downtown Bristol and celebrates the city's contribution to country music. It has grown into one of the more popular music festivals in Virginia and the Appalachia region, with nearly 50,000 attendees in 2012.

== Hardcore punk and heavy metal ==
The city of Richmond has long had one of the more active punk rock scenes on the East Coast. The city is perhaps best known for the shock-punk-metal band Gwar, known for wild on-stage antics. Gwar grew out of Death Piggy, a hardcore punk band that followed in the footsteps of local scene leaders White Cross, Beex, and the Prevaricators. However, Richmond punk became big with Avail. The Richmond punk scene grew, including Inquisition, Fun Size, Knucklehed, Uphill Down, Four Walls Falling, the Social Dropouts, Ann Beretta, Sixer, River City High, BraceWar, Smoke or Fire (originally from Boston), Strike Anywhere, and many underground bands. Among music venues existing during the Richmond '80s, Benny's, a bar near the campus of Virginia Commonwealth University, served as an anchor for the punk scene despite its small size.

Richmond punk is often mistakenly considered to be an offshoot of the D.C. scene. Richmond punk bands have developed a unique sound, often influenced by country, folk, and Southern rock (particularly prevalent in Avail, Sixer, and Ann Beretta and, to a lesser degree, in Strike Anywhere). This is most likely because Richmond, the Confederacy's capital for most of the Civil War, is arguably the South's oldest and liveliest punk scene. Richmond punk has a close relationship with Gainesville, Florida, punk, particularly between Avail and the now-disbanded Hot Water Music. Other hardcore bands from Richmond included Unseen Force, God's Will, Graven Image, and Honor Role.

Richmond also has an active metal scene that includes, in addition to Gwar, Lamb of God, Alabama Thunderpussy, and Municipal Waste. The metal scene is closely related to the city's punk rockers, and, like the punks, it has a Southern influence in Lamb of God's music, particularly in "Alabama Thunderpussy." Richmond still harbors an extremely strong hardcore scene, emerging from the shadows of the mid-1980s Four Walls Falling, Fed Up, Set Straight, Step Above, Count Me Out, and Dead Serious. More recently, a resurgence of old-school hardcore punk has emerged from Richmond, with bands such as Direct Control, Government Warning, and Wasted Time. Richmond also has a small post-hardcore scene with bands such as Remaniscense, Wow, Owls!, and Ultra Dolphins.

Norfolk was known, during hardcore's heyday, for violent clashes between punks and local military personnel from the Navy base. Ray Barbieri (Agnostic Front, Warzone) and John Joseph McGeown (Cro-Mags) became punks while serving in Norfolk after a judge's order.

Prompted by a 1983 article printed in Maximum Rocknroll which criticized the Virginia Beach-Norfolk metro area, formerly referred to as "Tidewater," as devoid of punk bands relative to Richmond, Jeff Clites, creator of the Tidewater-based 'zine, The Tidewater A.R.S.E., responded:

What's this shit about us only having half a band? In case you didn't know, there are many: (in alphabetical order)

1. Aggressive Behavior

2. ANSCHLUSS

3. Bottom Line

4. Dead Meat

5. Death Row

6. God's Will

7. HOIT

8. Jerry's Kids

9. Judicial Fear

10. KJB

11. Scat Ritual

12. Skater's Faith

13. Urban Discord

== See also ==
- Indigenous music of North America#Eastern Woodlands
