= Virality (EP) =

2022 EP by Yvngxchris

EP by Yvngxchris
- Released: August 19, 2022
- Recorded: 2021–2022
- Genres: Trap; hip-hop
- Length: 43:56
- Label: Columbia
- Producers: 3rdup; BLWYRMND; BrizzyOnDaBeat; Cxdy; DeCarlo; desmos; Devin Malik; Dylvinci; FINLINCE!; ilykimchi; mathiastyner; Mayyzo; Oogie Mane; ThankYouWill; YukiSX

Yvngxchris chronology
Everyone Hates Chris! (2020)	Virality (2022)	Everyone Hates Chris! II (2024)

Singles from Virality
- 1. "Damn Homie" Released: May 13, 2022; 2. "Ain't No Fun" Released: August 3, 2022; 3. "Giig" Released: August 12, 2022

Virality is the second extended play (EP) by American rapper Yvngxchris. It was released on August 19, 2022, through Columbia Records, as the follow-up to his 2020 EP, Everyone Hates Chris! (2020). The album was recorded throughout 2021 and 2022 and features production from Cxdy, Ilykimchi and Oogie Mane, among others. The album's lead single, "Damn Homie", featuring Lil Yachty was released on May 13, 2022.

== Background and recording ==
In December 2020, Yvngxchris released his debut EP Everyone Hates Chris, which went viral on TikTok. Williams would sign a record deal with Columbia Records in 2021.

In an interview with BET, Yvngxchris discussed how he began recording tracks for his EP about a year before its official release, when he was around the age of 16 and 17. In an interview with Dylan Green of DJ Booth, Yvngxchris noted he got the name Virality from an Instagram caption for a picture the year before the EP's release, around the time his song "Blood on the Leaves" went viral. Chris claimed he didn't know if the word was real or not, but he liked the word since it tied to his own career, since a multitude of his songs had gone viral. Chris went on to explain how he "just wanted to make a whole viral, unskippable tape".

== Release and promotion ==
After finishing the recording for Virality, Williams would showcase the EP's cover art on social media, as well as the release date for the EP, which he stated would be on August 19, 2022. After the announcements, Yvngxchris would release the EP to all streaming platforms on August 19, 2022. Following the release, Yvngxchris announced that there would be a tour in support of his EP, which would be called the "Barely Legal Tour", and would be supported by fellow labelmate SSGKobe.

== Composition ==
=== Songs ===
Lead single "Ain't No Fun" is a "hi-hat and bass-heavy banger", according to Joey Ech of XXL Magazine. According to Claire Yotts of Our Generation Music, the track sees Yvngxchris "body the 808-heavy beat with more fast-paced bars and a scintillating ASMR hook". Yotts also states that the song sees the rapper assert himself as one of the "youngest hitmakers to grace the mic as of late".

On the tracks "QuikkSkope" featuring DC The Don, and "Lyte" with Xlovclo, Yotts praised Yvngxchris' versatility and ability to rap "hard-hitting verses" over more melodic beats compared to the rest of the EP. Both tracks see Yvngxchris "spitting quick rambling verses that lead into smooth chorus transitions by DC and Clo". Yotss praises how this shows off the different styles that Yvngxchris can approach; however, "Chris makes it known that he can kill any beat that he hops on". On "Giig", Yotts praises the TikTok-viral track, citing how "Chris snaps with short bars over rumbling 808s produced by Cxdy. His flow hits quick pockets as the young emcee mimics the flashing hits of the kicks and drums within the instrumental". Neena Rouhani and Cydney Lee of Billboard praised "QuikkSkope", with the two writing how "genre-bending" the track is. Lee and Rouhani wrote how the track incorporates "'80s production elements, futuristic synths, trap drums and indie percussion, which somehow all make sense together".

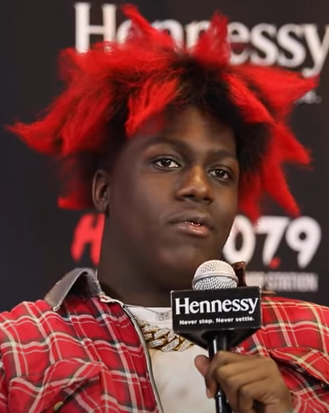
Lil Yachty features on "Damn Homie".

According to Ech, Lil Yachty provides "angelic vocals" on "Damn Homie". Aiden C. Werder of Our Generation Music wrote that the track "Damn Homie" taps back into early 2000s nostalgia, mixed with a "modern-sounding hit". Werder stated how the track opens with "Chris' familiar, unrelenting raspy flow — skating over an uncharacteristically melody-less beat", courtesy of Decarlo & Blwyrmnd — "later contrasted by way of a high-pitched delivery from a relaxed Yachty". According to Aaron Williams of UPROXX, "Damn Homie" sees Yvngxchris take the "screwball energy" influence from rappers such as Comethazine, Ski Mask the Slump God, and Playboi Carti. Williams also wrote how the track sees Yvngxchris "litter his rapid-fire verses with brain-bending rhyme patterns and smirk-inducing punchlines, showing that he's got his own unique take on the SoundCloud-inspired style that is making him a favorite of the TikTok generation". Additionally, the track's mixing was done by Mike Dean, according to Yvngxchris.

Switching over to more melodic vibes, "Serenity (Letter To X)" sees Yvngxchris pay homage to rapper XXXTentacion, whom Chris looked up to growing up. According to Dylan Green of DJ Booth, the track "Serenity" sees Yvngxchris "glide by on a rap-R&B hybrid of a beat produced by Dylvinci that sees Chris revisit the day he learned XXXTentacion was killed during an attempted robbery in 2018".

== Track listing ==
All tracks are written by All tracks are written by Christian Eugene Williams, "Damn Homie" by Miles Parks McCollum, "QuikkSkope" by Daijon Cotty Davis and "Red Lyte" by Chloe King.

Virality track listing
No.	Title	Producer(s)	Length
1.	"Forrest Gump"	Finlince	1:41
2.	"Damn Homie (with Lil Yachty)"	Decarlo; Blwyrmnd	2:20
3.	"Gunninhimdown"	Mathiastyner; Desmos	1:48
4.	"QuikkSkope (with DC The Don)"	Oogie Mane; ilykimchi; Mayyzo; 3rdup	2:41
5.	"Giig"	Cxdy; Thankyouwill	1:47
6.	"Red Lyte"	Dylvinci	3:31
7.	"Ain't No Fun"	Brizzy On Da Beat	2:08
8.	"Serenity (Letter To X)"	Dylvinci	3;16
Total length:			19:15
