= Homemade =

Homemade or Home Made may refer to:

- Handicraft, things that are made by hand
- Home cooking, food prepared from ingredients at home, in contrast to restaurant or mass-produced meals

== Film and television ==
- Home Made (1927 film), an American silent comedy film
- Home Made (2017 film), an Israeli short film
- Homemade (TV series), a 2020 Italian-Chilean anthology series
- homeMADE, a 2009 Australian reality TV series
- Homemade TV, a 1976–1977 Canadian children's TV series
- Homemade, a 2006–2007 British TV series on T4
- Homemade, a 2026 Israeli TV series on Yes

== Music ==
- Homemade (Cephas & Wiggins album), 1999
- Homemade (The Osmonds album), 1971
- Homemade, an EP by Cold Creek County, 2017
- "Homemade" (song), by Jake Owen, 2019
