= Epiphany (Kashdami album) =

epiphany

Studio album by Kashdami
- Released: June 2, 2021
- Recorded: 2020–2021
- Genres: Hip-hop; trap
- Length: 26:47
- Labels: Kashwayz; Republic
- Producers: 1kSensei; Abstrkt; Cloudbxy; DiorWinterr; Dylvinci; FwThis1Will; Glumboy; ilycrisis; Khi; Lil Red Beats; Lil Tecca; Lincoln Minaj; Mike Hector; Milanezie; StoopidXool; ThankYouWill; young emphasis

Epiphany (stylized in all lowercase) is the debut studio album by the American rapper Kashdami, originally released on June 2, 2021, through Republic Records. Epiphany was supported by two singles "Look N The Mirror" and "Reparations", and it was increasing traction online on TikTok, since 2022.

The album of Epiphany consists different features track and guest appearances from artists, D'mari Harris, Riovaz, and mainly popular artists SSGKobe, yvngxchris, and tana. Epiphany is an 26-minute album, contains his latest singles, pacing his early work music career. Epiphany was an hip-hop and trap debut studio album, blending elements of vocals. Epiphany was a popular album influenced the song "I Know", produced by Lil Tecca. Kashdami shots multiple music videos of that album.

== Background ==
Kashdami gained traction online with his single "Look N The Mirror" on March 17, 2021 and signed a record deal with Republic Records. Look N The Mirror was a breakout single of Kashdami. The debut album Epiphany was an digital-download streaming track, characterized and featuring with additional artist, such as Riovaz, D'mari Harris, tana, yvngxchris, and SSGKobe.

== Singles ==
The single "Reparations" was originally released on January 16, 2021, when the album was announced. "Dior" was released on May 12, 2021. "50" was released on March 2, 2021. "Look N The Mirror" was released on March 17, 2021, mixing an engineer American rapper tana. "Beep" was a freestyle single on April 6, 2021. Kashdami released the extended version of "Reparations" on July 14, 2021 and Average was released on the same day.

== Critical reception ==
According to Alphonse Pierre of Pitchfork he rated the album a 6.8 out of 10, stating that the album was described as a "dreamy yet dark mixtape into gruff flows and gun-toting punchlines with a wink". The album was not rated.

== Track listing ==
Epiphany track listing
No.	Title	Writer(s)	Producer(s)	Length
1.	"Dior"	Kashdami	FwThis1Will	1:58
2.	"Figures"	David Wallace	DiorWinterr; Rnshki	1:37
3.	"Up"	David Wallace	1kSensei; Abstrkt; FwThis1Will	1:43
4.	"Receipts"	David Wallace; Steven Lewis	Dylvinci; StoopidXool	2:11
5.	"Look n the Mirror"	David Wallace	Glumboy; Cloudbxy; Lincoln Minaj	1:25
6.	"See Ya"	David Wallace	Abstrkt; 1kSensei; Mike Hector	1:42
7.	"I Know"	David Wallace	Lil Tecca	1:32
8.	"Trust Issues"	David Wallace; Brandon Hernandez		2:27
9.	"Reparations"	David Wallace	Milanezie	1:02
10.	"50"	David Wallace	Lil Red Beats	2:31
11.	"Wake Up"	David Wallace; Tyreek Pellerin		2:08
12.	"Ily/Sincerely"	Kashdami		1:05
13.	"Joe Biden"	Kashdami; FwThis1Will		1:05
14.	"Average"	Kashdami; 1kSensei; FwThis1Will; Milanezie		1:42
15.	"Reparations" (extended version)	Kashdami; Milanezie		1:14
16.	"Beep"	Kashdami; Milanezie		1:16
Total length:				26:47
