= Kashdami =

American rapper (born 2004)

- Also known as: Dami; Oso; Him
- Born: David Wallace III; December 16, 2004 (age 21); Las Vegas, Nevada, U.S.
- Origin: King George County, Virginia, U.S.
- Genres: Hip hop; R&B; Plugg
- Occupations: Rapper; singer; songwriter
- Works: Discography
- Years active: 2018–present
- Labels: Republic; Mercury; KA$HWAYZ
- Website: kashwayz.com

David Wallace III (born December 16, 2004), known professionally as Kashdami (stylized as KA$HDAMI), is an American rapper and singer. He gained popularity in the underground hip-hop scene in 2021 from social media and streaming platforms such as TikTok and SoundCloud, to his popular songs, leading to his signing with Republic Records.

== Early life ==
David Wallace III was born on December 16, 2004, in King George County, Virginia. He early gained experience to his family, including his father, which he later died when Wallace was seven. Following to circumstances, Wallace and his mother moved to Maryland, to convert his closer relatives. Growing up in his early life, Wallace spent most of his 22 years of his childhood, before moving into his parents. Due to his father passing away, he relocated from Las Vegas, Nevada, exclusively to Washington D.C. of convenience a new feature family. Wallace began into music, getting inspiration by Black Eyed Pears, recording music to his mom's computer. During his music career, he first attended school at a young age, he would later be in college. After finishing school, he moved to his hometown to pursue his music career.

== Career ==
Kashdami began his career in 2018, just recording at 8 years old. He would record music to his mom's computer and would go on Audacity. Around 13 years old, he first rose to prominence when "Kappin Up" became popular on TikTok following a dance challenge in 2020, leading to a music video on the YouTube channel WorldStarHipHop.

In January 2021, his breakout single "Reparations" was released and gained popularity on various platforms including TikTok and SoundCloud. His follow-up single, "Look n the Mirror", also gained traction. In May 2021, Kashdami signed a deal with Republic Records. On June 2, 2021, he released his debut commercial mixtape, Epiphany, through Republic Records, with production from Lil Tecca and features from tana, yvngxchris, SSGKobe, Riovaz, and D'mari Harris.

Kashdami then released his song "Intermission" in October 2021, the lead single to his mixtape Hypernova, which was released on November 12, 2021 with a sole feature from Trippie Redd. On September 16, 2022, World Domination was released. It features the artists NoCap, XLOVCLO, ilyFall, Slump6s, and midwxst. Kashdami released his first R&B single, "Games", on October 27, 2023. He started 2024 off by dropping his highly anticipated single "Want!" after the snippet gained virality on TikTok. Brent Faiyaz was seen in the snippet.

Before gaining recognition to his fame, Kashdami released an early life video titled "The Life of Kash:Paper Trail", which considered the experience of maps that travels through the city. On September 5, 2025, Kashdami later then premiered his third studio album on YouTube, gaining recognition to his fame as an result. Around in 2026, due to his final comeback of releasing singles, he released "##Flexin". In 2026, Ka$hdami released his latest single "Touchdown", which independently uploaded on SoundCloud.

== Musical style ==
Wallace's style is often characterized to the microgenre of the plugg and rage rap scenes. Wallace was widely known for putting Minecraft "creeper explosion sounds" into his music.

== Personal life ==
Kashdami was born on December 16, 2004, in King George County, Virginia, and spent most of his 22 years of his family life, before moving back to his family in Washington D.C. to his hometown. It was revealed that Kashdami was inspired by Black Eyed Pears, just recording music at 8 years old, formerly from the 2020 underground hip-hop scene of plugg. Kashdami presented his day in the life series, titled "The Life of Ka$h", on YouTube. It features his experiences of maps and traveling through cities. The first video was uploaded on July 19, 2021, through the title "Pilot", comparing his behind the scenes of how he record his music.

== Discography ==
=== Studio albums ===
Title	Album details
epiphany	Released: June 2, 2021; Label: Republic, KA$HWAYZ; Formats: Digital download, streaming
WORLD DAMINATION	Released: September 16, 2022; Label: Republic, Mercury, KA$HWAYZ; Formats: Digital download, streaming
oasis	Released: February 23, 2024; Label: Republic, Mercury, KA$HWAYZ; Formats: Digital download, streaming
INFINITI	Released: September 13, 2024; Label: INFINITI / KA$HWAYZ; Formats: Digital download, streaming
PAPER TRAIL	Released: September 5, 2025; Label: KA$HWAYZ; Format: Self-released
BLUEPRINT	Released: October 9, 2026; Label: INFINITI / KA$HWAYZ; Format: Digital download, streaming

=== Mixtapes ===
Title	Mixtape details
#KashDontMiss	Released: June 12, 2020; Label: KA$HWAYZ; Formats: Digital download, streaming
16	Released: December 16, 2020; Label: KA$HWAYZ; Formats: Digital download, streaming
Hypernova.	Released: November 12, 2021; Label: Republic, KA$HWAYZ; Formats: Digital download, streaming

=== Singles ===
- Reparations (2021)
- Look n the Mirror (2021)
- Trust Issues (2021)
- Games (2023)
- Seance (2024)
- Receipts (2021)
- Kappin Up (2020)
- $umn$light (2020)
- Wake Up (2021)
- posed2be (2022)
- ##Flexin (2026)
- Touchdown (2026)

=== Guest appearances ===
Title	Year	Artist(s)	Album
"14"	2020	tana	—N/a
"Cabo"	2021	Bankrol Hayden, DDG (rapper)	—N/a
"Blow Her Back Out"	2021	Yung Bans	—N/a
"Blood on the Leaves (Remix)"	2021	yvngxchris, Ken Carson, UnoTheActivist, & SSGKobe.	—N/a
"Plug"	2021	MadeinTYO, UnoTheActivist	Yokohama
"Time Today!"	2021	Yung Fazo, Xhulooo	#frvralone
"2 MUCH"	2022	Whethan, Jasiah	MIDNIGHT
KILL EM FOR ME	2022	Dro Kenji	ANYWHERE BUT HERE
"LA"	2021	midwxst	BACK IN ACTION 2.0
"Underground"	2022	Dougie B, yvngxchris	Nobody Bigger
