= Cough (band) =

American metal band

Cough is a US sludge/doom metal band. They released three albums, including two on Relapse Records, 2010's Ritual Abuse and 2016's Still They Pray.

Hailing from Richmond, Virginia, the band was founded around 2005. Described by Allmusic as about equal doses of doom and sludge metal, the band signed with Relapse Records in 2010. There, they released two full-length albums as well as two split albums.

== Discography ==
- The Kingdom (EP, 2006)
- Sigillum Luciferi (2008)
- Ritual Abuse (2010)
- An Introduction to the Black Arts (split with The Wounded Kings, 2010)
- Reflection of the Negative (split with Windhand, 2013)
- Still They Pray (2016)
- More Dead than Live (live album, 2019)
