= Thracian (disambiguation) =

Thracian may refer to someone or something from or related to Thrace, in any of several meanings of that term. More specifically, it may refer to:

== People ==
- Thracians, an ancient Indo-European people
  - Thracian language, an extinct IE language
  - Thracian religion, the religion of the Thracians
- Thracian Bulgarians, the ethnic Bulgarian people from Northern Thrace and the whole region of Thrace
- List of Thracian Greeks, Greeks from the region of Thrace
- Turks of Western Thrace, the ethnic Turkish people from Western Thrace

== Figures ==
- Maximinus the Thracian, a Roman emperor
- Dionysius the Thracian, an Ancient Greek grammarian
- Leo the Thracian, an Eastern Roman emperor
- Justin the Thracian, an Eastern Roman emperor

== In geography ==
- Thrace
- Northern Thrace
  - Upper Thracian Plain, a plain in Bulgaria
- East Thrace
  - Thracian Chersonese, the ancient name of the Gallipoli peninsula
- Western Thrace
- Thracian Sea, a sea part of the Aegean Sea

== In arts ==
- Thracian horseman, an ancient cult
- Thracian Tomb of Sveshtari, an ancient tomb
- Thracian Tomb of Kazanlak, an ancient tomb
- The Thracian Wonder, a play

== Other uses ==
- Thraex/Thracian, a type of Roman gladiator

== See also ==
- Thrax (disambiguation)
- Thracology
