= Windhand / Satan's Satyrs =

EP by Windhand and Satan's Satyrs
- Released: February 16, 2018
- Label: Relapse

Windhand chronology
Grief's Infernal Flower (2015)	Windhand / Satan's Satyrs (2018)	Eternal Return (2018)

Satan's Satyrs chronology
Don't Deliver Us (2015)	Windhand / Satan's Satyrs (2018)

Windhand / Satan's Satyrs is a 2018 split extended play (EP) by American bands Windhand and Satan's Satyrs.

== Release ==
Windhand / Satan's Satyrs was released on February 16 on vinyl, compact disc and as a digital download. This split EP peaked at 11 on the Top Heatseekers on its release.

Following its release, Satan's Satyrs and Windhand played a record release show on together on March 23, 2018, in Richmond, Virginia.

== Reception ==
Professional ratings
Review scores
Source	Rating
AllMusic	3.5/5 stars
Exclaim!	(7/10)

James Christopher Monger of AllMusic declared that the EP "delivers enough wattage to power the East Coast through a category five hurricane.", and declared Satan's Satyrs song "Succubus" was a highlight that "grooves as hard as it spanks." Brayden Turenne of Exclaim! noted that "despite its power" the song "Three Sisters" by Windhand "can feel over-long toward the end" noting that it does not change much from how it initially starts.

== Track listing ==
Track listing adapted liner notes.

1. Windhand – "Old Evil"
2. Windhand – "Three Sisters"
3. Satan's Satyrs – "Alucard A.D. 2018"
4. Satan's Satyrs – "Succubus"
5. Satan's Satyrs – "Ain't That Lovin' You, Baby"

== Credits ==
Credits adapted from liner notes.

- Parker Chandler – bass (on 1, 2)
- Dorthia Cottrell – vocals (on 1, 2)
- Garrett Morris – guitar (on 1, 2)
- Ryan Wolfe – drums (on 1, 2)
- Jonathan Kassalow – keyboards (on 1, 2)
- Clayton Burgess – bass, vocals, mixing (on 3, 4, 5)
- Jarrett Nettnin – guitar (on 3, 4, 5)
- Nate Towle – guitar (on 3, 4, 5)
- Stephen Fairfield – drums (on 3, 4, 5)
- Garrett Morris – recording and mixing
- Brad Boatright – mastering
- Orion Landau – artwork
