= Norwood Allman =

American lawyer

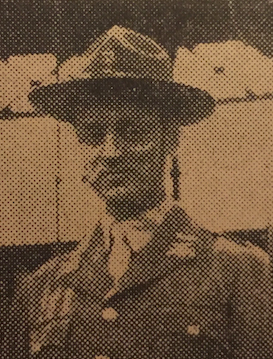

Councillor, Shanghai Municipal Council
- In office April 1940 – January 1942

Personal details
- Born: July 23, 1893 Union Hall, Virginia, U.S.
- Died: February 28, 1987 (aged 93) Carlisle, Pennsylvania, U.S.
- Profession: Consul, lawyer, intelligence officer

Norwood Francis Allman (July 23, 1893 – February 28, 1987) was a China-based American lawyer, consul, newspaperman and judge and also served as a member of the Shanghai Municipal Council from 1940 to 1942. During World War II he served in the OSS in charge of Far East Counter-intelligence and later worked for the CIA.

== Early life ==
Allman was born on 24 July 1893, in Union Hall, Virginia. Allman attended the University of Virginia for one year before sitting the consular exam.

== Consular career in China ==
Allman was appointed student interpreter in the American legation in Peking in 1915, and served as a consular officer in various locations finally serving as consul in Shanghai from 1921 to 1924. During that time, he also sat as an assessor (at the time, effectively a co-judge) on the International Mixed Court.

== Marriage ==
Allman married Mary Louise Hamilton on 12 August 1920 in Qingdao. They had three children.

== Shanghai ==
In 1924, having been admitted to practice before the United States Court for China, Allman retired from consular service and practised law in Shanghai. He also served as honorary Mexican consul in Shanghai.

From 1937, he took over the running of as the editor of the Chinese language Shun Pao newspaper. He was placed on a Japanese black list because of the paper's editorial policies. In 1940, he was elected a member Shanghai Municipal Council. He was in Hong Kong on business when World War II started and was interned in Stanley Internment Camp.

In 1943, he published a book, Shanghai Lawyer, about his career in China.

After being repatriated, he served in the Office of Strategic Services during the war and continued to work for the CIA after the war. He returned to Shanghai in 1946 to restart his legal practice and also owned and edited the English language China Press.

== Life in America ==
Allman left China in 1950 and returned to America. He was a broadcaster in America for a number of years.

== Death ==
Allman died on 28 February 1987, in Carlisle, Pennsylvania.
