= Cephas & Wiggins =

American blues duo

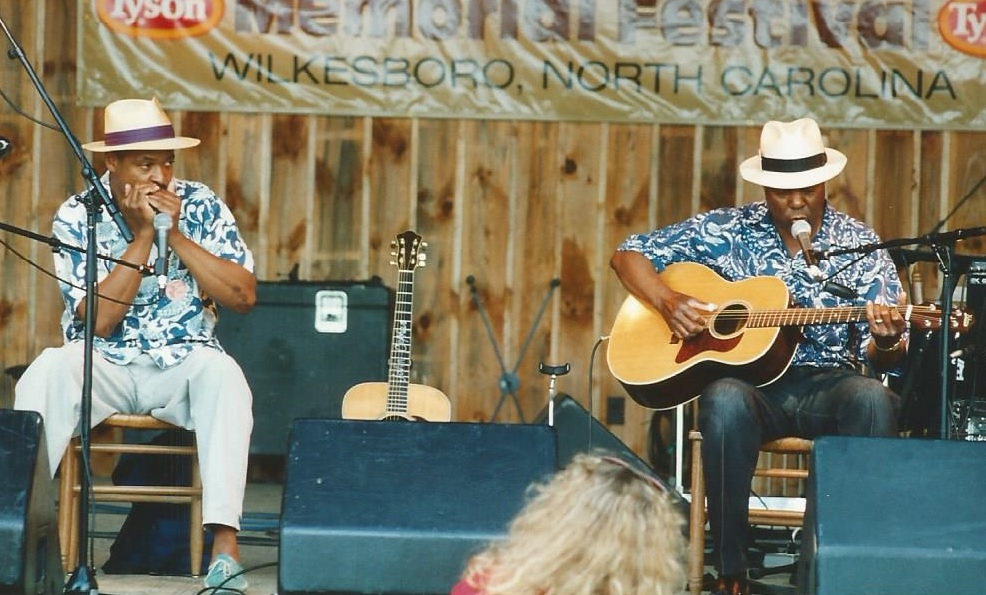
Cephas & Wiggins performing at Merlefest in 1994

Cephas & Wiggins was an American acoustic blues duo, composed of the guitarist John Cephas (September 4, 1930 – March 4, 2009) and the harmonica player Phil Wiggins (May 8, 1954 – May 7, 2024) They were known for playing Piedmont blues.

== History ==
Both musicians were born in Washington D.C. Cephas, who was 24 years older than Wiggins, grew up in Bowling Green, Virginia. They first met at a jam session at the Smithsonian's Festival of American Folklife in 1976 and played together in Big Chief Ellis's band. When Ellis died, they decided to continue as a duo.

In 1980, Cephas & Wiggins were recorded by the German archivists Siegfried Christmann and Axel Küstner. These recordings, their first as a duo, were released the following year as a part of the Living Country Blues USA series on the German label L+R. They also appeared around Washington, D.C., with the Travelling Blues Workshop, which included John Jackson, Archie Edwards, Flora Molton, and Mother Scott.

Their first U.S. release, the album Dog Days of August, was issued by Flying Fish Records in 1986. Two more albums followed from Flying Fish. After they left the label, they released one album for the New York–based Chesky Records and four albums for Alligator Records. They released the album Richmond Blues on Folkways Records in 2008.

Until the late 1980s, Cephas made his primary living as a carpenter at the D.C. National Armory, playing music on the side. In the 1990s, he became a professional musician, sometimes earning money by teaching classes and workshops.

As a duo, they toured extensively, primarily courtesy of the sponsorship of the United States Department of State. They performed together across the USA, as well as in Africa, Asia, South and Central America, and the Soviet Union.

Cephas was a recipient of a 1989 National Heritage Fellowship awarded by the National Endowment for the Arts, which is the United States government's highest honor in the folk and traditional arts. In 2017, Wiggins received a National Heritage Fellowship as well. Wiggins received the State of Maryland Heritage Award in 2021.

Cephas died of pulmonary fibrosis on March 4, 2009, at age 78. He is buried at Quantico National Cemetery in Virginia. Wiggins died of multiple organ cancers at his home in Takoma Park, Maryland, on May 7, 2024, at the age of 69.

== Awards and honors ==
- 1987 Blues Music Awards, Entertainer of the Year Award winners
- 1988 Washington DC Mayor's Arts Award for Cephas
- 1989 National Heritage Fellowship for Cephas
- 1990 Blues Music Awards, Traditional Blues Album (Guitar Man) winners
- Between 1995 and 2007, eleven Blues Music Award/W.C. Handy Blues Award nominations for Cephas & Wiggins in the Acoustic Album, Acoustic Artist, and Traditional Blues Album categories
- 2017 National Heritage Fellowship for Wiggins

== Discography ==
=== Albums ===
- Living Country Blues USA, vol. 1, (L+R, 1981)
- Sweet Bitter Blues, (L+R, 1984, reissued by Evidence, 1994)
- Let It Roll: Bowling Green, (Marimac, 1985)
- Dog Days of August, (Flying Fish, 1986)
- Guitar Man, (Flying Fish, 1987)
- Walking Blues, (Marimac, 1988)
- Flip, Flop & Fly, (Flying Fish, 1992)
- Bluesmen, (Chesky, 1993)
- Cool Down, (Alligator, 1996)
- Homemade, (Alligator, 1999)
- Somebody Told the Truth, (Alligator, 2002)
- Shoulder to Shoulder, (Alligator, 2006)
- Richmond Blues, (Smithsonian Folkways, 2008)

=== Compilation albums ===
- Goin' down the Road Feelin' Bad, 1998 (Evidence), compilation of L+R material
- From Richmond to Atlanta, 2000 (Rounder), compilation of Flying Fish material
