= Blood on the Leaves (Yvngxchris song) =

Single by Yvngxchris
- Released: November 2, 2021
- Recorded: 2021
- Genre: Drill
- Length: 2:08
- Producer: 2300 Beats

Yvngxchris singles chronology
"Off the Leash" (2021)	"Blood on the Leaves" (2021)	"Excuse Me" (2022)

"Blood on the Leaves" is a song by American rapper Yvngxchris. It was released in November 2, 2021. It is a drill song and went viral on TikTok. Produced by 2300 Beats, the song samples a chopped version of Nina Simone's cover of "Strange Fruit".

== Background and release ==
The song was first previewed through a now-deleted snippet on his old TikTok account. The track would also initially be met with controversy. In an interview with XXL, Yvngxchris commented on "Blood on the Leaves", saying:

"That's my biggest song to date right now. I just recorded the very first part, the "Bitch, I be killing these beats" part. Then, it went crazy on TikTok, so I had to finish the song. It was this dance trend where people were freezing and acting like a picture. Videos was going up, like 2,000 videos a day."

The song addresses the deaths of Breonna Taylor and George Floyd. Yvngxchris had also announced that SSGKobe's verse would be featured in the remix for the song. The remix featured SSGKobe, UnoTheActivist, Kashdami, and Ken Carson.
