= Reflection of the Negative =

Studio album (Split) by Cough and Windhand
- Released: April 16, 2013
- Genre: Doom metal
- Length: 36:40
- Label: Relapse
- Producer: Garret Morris

Cough chronology
Ritual Abuse (2010)	Reflection of the Negative (2013)	Still They Pray (2016)

Windhand chronology
Windhand (2012)	Reflection of the Negative (2013)	Soma (2013)

Reflection of the Negative is a split album by American doom metal bands Cough and Windhand. It was released on April 16, 2013 via Relapse Records.

In a separate song review of "Athame", Pitchfork called it Cough's "most powerful offering to date".

== Track listing ==
No.	Title	Length
1.	"Athame" (Cough)	18:30
2.	"Amaranth" (Windhand)	7:25
3.	"Shepherd's Crook" (Windhand)	10:45
Total length:		36:40

Professional ratings
Review scores
Source	Rating
CVLT Nation	Positive
Exclaim!	7/10
Pitchfork	7.9/10
Popmatters	7/10
Ox-Fanzine	4/5 stars
