= Thrax =

Thrax or Thraex (Latin borrowing of Ancient Greek Θρᾷξ "Thracian") may refer to:

- Historical figures:
  - Dionysius Thrax (c. 170-90 BC), a Hellenistic grammarian
  - Maximinus Thrax (c. 173–238), Roman emperor from Moesia
  - Leo I (emperor) Eastern Roman emperor
  - Justin I Eastern Roman emperor
- Thrax (mythology), a child of Ares
- "Thrax" (song), a 2021 song by SSGKobe
- Thrax, a character in the television series Exosquad
- Thrax, a virus and the main antagonist in the film Osmosis Jones
- Thrax (Power Rangers), a villain from the 15th anniversary episodes of Power Rangers
- Thrax, the City of Windowless Rooms from The Book of the New Sun novel series by Gene Wolfe

== See also ==
- Anthrax, a bacterial infection
- Thraex, a type of Roman gladiator
