= Front Porch Blues =

Studio album by John Jackson
- Released: 1999
- Genres: Blues; Piedmont blues
- Length: 44:54
- Label: Alligator
- Producer: Joe Wilson

John Jackson chronology
Country Blues & Ditties (1999)	Front Porch Blues (1999)	Rappahannock Blues (2010)

Front Porch Blues is an album by the American musician John Jackson, released in 1999. It was Jackson's first studio album of new recordings in 16 years. He supported it with a North American tour. Front Porch Blues was nominated for a W. C. Handy Award for "Comeback Blues Album". Jackson referred to his music as "mountain hoedown".

== Production ==
The album was produced by Joe Wilson. Jackson recorded it while working as a part-time gravedigger. He used a resonator guitar, and believed that the blues was best expressed with just a voice and guitar. "Rappahannock Blues" is an instrumental, named for the Virginia county of Jackson's birth. "West Texas Blues" is a version of the blues standard, modeled after Jimmie Rodgers's interpretation. "Chesterfield" is a salute to Chesterfield cigarettes, inspired by Buddy Moss's similar song. "Have It Your Own Way" features a vocal by Jackson's son, James. "The Devil He Wore a Hickory Shoe" is an interpretation of a gospel song beloved by Jackson's mother. "Death Don't Have No Mercy" was written by Reverend Gary Davis.

== Critical reception ==
Professional ratings
Review scores
Source	Rating
The Gazette	8.5/10
The Penguin Guide to Blues Recordings	3.5/4 stars
Pittsburgh Post-Gazette	3.5/4 stars

The Gazette noted that Jackson's "music is informed not only by the blues, but also by the country, ragtime and early jazz records he heard growing up". Billboard called the album "a sweet recital drawn from the musician's apparently vast repertoire of country blues." The Washington Post said that "Jackson has pared away all the unnecessary notes to reveal the essential dialogue between his gravelly baritone voice and his sparkling, skeletal guitar lines." The Edmonton Journal stated that Jackson's "voice is a warm but flexible instrument that is equally comfortable performing story songs, relating dramatic gospel inspired tunes or conveying raw emotions." The Pittsburgh Post-Gazette praised the "delicate lines and finger-picked versions of ... traditional tunes". The Times deemed Front Porch Blues "the best acoustic blues of the year".

== Track listing ==
Front Porch Blues track listing
No.	Title	Length
1.	"Railroad Bill"	4:03
2.	"C. C. Rider"	3:01
3.	"Death Don't Have No Mercy"	3:26
4.	"Chesterfield"	2:46
5.	"Steel Mill Blues"	3:00
6.	"Louisiana Blues"	2:14
7.	"Just Because"	3:39
8.	"Red River Blues"	2:45
9.	"Fairfax Station Rag"	1:33
10.	"West Texas Blues"	3:34
11.	"When He Calls Me"	3:10
12.	"Midnight Hour Blues"	3:20
13.	"Rappahannock Blues"	1:33
14.	"She's So Sweet"	2:59
15.	"The Devil He Wore a Hickory Shoe"	2:06
16.	"Have It Your Own Way"	1:45
Total length:		44:54
