= The Wounded Kings =

British metal band

The Wounded Kings were a British doom metal band. They released five albums, including two on Candlelight Records, 2014's Consolamentum and 2016's Visions in Bone.

Hailig from Dartmoor, the band began as a duo: Steve Mills and George Birch. In 2011, Sharie Neyland took over the vocals from Birch, and other band members were also added. Following two albums with Neyland singing, Birch returned. After completing their fifth album Visions in Bone, but before it was released, the band announced its breakup.

== Discography ==
- Embrace of the Narrow House (2008)
- The Shadow over Atlantis (2010)
- An Introduction to the Black Arts (split with Cough, 2010)
- In the Chapel of the Black Hand (2011)
- Consolamentum (2014)
- Curse of Chains (EP, 2014)
- Visions in Bone (2016)
