= Thrace (disambiguation) =

Thrace is a geographic region in the eastern Balkans, today divided between Bulgaria, Greece and Turkey.

== Historical entities ==
- Thrace (satrapy), an Achaemenid Persian province
- Odrysian kingdom, which ruled much of Thrace in Antiquity, formed by the Odrysians
- Lysimachian kingdom, Hellenistic Diadochi state centered in Thrace
- Sapaean kingdom, Roman client state
- Thracia, a Roman imperial province
- Diocese of Thrace, a late Roman/early Byzantine province
- Thrace (theme), a middle and late Byzantine province

== Geographical/political divisions ==
- Eastern Thrace, the Turkish part of Thrace, also known as European Turkey
- Northern Thrace, the Bulgarian part of Thrace
- Macedonia-Thrace
  - Eastern Macedonia-Thrace
    - Western Thrace, the Greek part of Thrace

== Other uses ==
- Thrace (mythology), the region's eponymous heroine in Greek mythology
- Kara Thrace, a character in the TV series Battlestar Galactica
- Mount Thrace, mountain in Antarctica
- Macedonian Thrace Brewery

== See also ==
- Thracians
- Thracian (disambiguation)
