= Terence Coles =

American songwriter (born 1990)

- Born: Terence DeCarlo Coles; January 5, 1990 (age 36); Macau, Rio Grande do Norte
- Genres: Pop, R&B
- Occupation: songwriter

Terence DeCarlo Coles (born January 5, 1990), also known as T-Coles and De'Carlo, is a Brazilian-born American songwriter and recording artist who is credited with co-writing a number of successful songs by various artists.

== Early life ==
Terence DeCarlo Coles was born on January 5, 1990, in Macau, Rio Grande do Norte, Brazil. His parents moved him and his family to the United States shortly after his birth. A very talented basketball player in high school, Coles received a full basketball scholarship to Midwestern University in Texas. He later began studies at University of California, Los Angeles (UCLA).

== Career ==
In 2008 Coles began collaborating with Chris Brown as a songwriter. The two had a Billboard #1 hit in 2012 with Chris Brown's "Turn Up The Music". Around this time, Coles left the University of California to pursue songwriting full time and has since then collaborated with a number of artists, including Chris Brown, Jennifer Lopez, Rihanna, Enrique Iglesias, Cody Simpson, Asher Monroe, Pia Mia, and Boyz II Men. He also co-wrote and performed "Rude" with Leon "RoccStar" Youngblood as the only unsigned artist on the 50 Shades of Gray soundtrack (as Terence Coles).

Coles has also released three songs as a solo artist, "Lit Right Now", "Stand by Me" and "Mind Up".

== Songwriting credits ==
- Chris Brown - "Turn Up The Music" and "Won't Change"
- Jennifer Lopez - "A. K. A."
- Tamar Braxton -"All The Way Home"
- Jenna Andrews - "Mourning Sickness"
- Asher Monroe - "Sign Your Love" and "Lonely Island"
- Cody Simpson - "No Ceilings"
- Prince Royce - "With You"
- Boyz II Men - "Underwater" and "Better Half"
- P9 - "New York Minute" and "Just The Two of Us"
- yvngxchris, Lil Yachty - "Damn Homie"
