= Grief's Infernal Flower =

Studio album by Windhand
- Released: September 18, 2015
- Studio: Soundhouse Studios
- Genre: Doom metal
- Length: 71:09
- Label: Relapse
- Producer: Jack Endino

Windhand chronology
Soma (2013)	Grief's Infernal Flower (2015)	Windhand / Satan's Satyrs (2018)

Professional ratings
Aggregate scores
Source	Rating
Metacritic	82/100
Review scores
Source	Rating
AllMusic	3.5/5 stars
Consequence of Sound	A−
Exclaim!	8/10
Pitchfork	7.8/10
NPR (website)	(positive)

Grief's Infernal Flower is the third album by American doom metal band Windhand. The album was released on September 18, 2015 via Relapse Records. It was named the 17th best album of 2015 by Consequence of Sound.

On the Billboard charts, Grief's Infernal Flower reached No. 7 on Heatseekers Albums, No. 4 on Vinyl Albums, No. 16 on Hard Rock Albums, No. 39 on Top Rock Albums, and No. 17 on Tastemakers. It is Windhand's best-charting release to date.

== Track listing ==
No.	Title	Length
1.	"Two Urns"	8:11
2.	"Forest Clouds"	9:11
3.	"Crypt Key"	5:39
4.	"Tanngrisnir"	5:36
5.	"Sparrow"	4:46
6.	"Hyperion"	5:29
7.	"Hesperus"	14:26
8.	"Kingfisher"	14:19
9.	"Aition"	3:32
Total length:		71:09

== Personnel ==
- Dorthia Cottrell – vocals
- Asechiah Bogdan – guitars
- Garrett Morris – guitars
- Parker Chandler – bass
- Ryan Wolfe – drums
