= John Jackson (blues musician) =

American blues musician

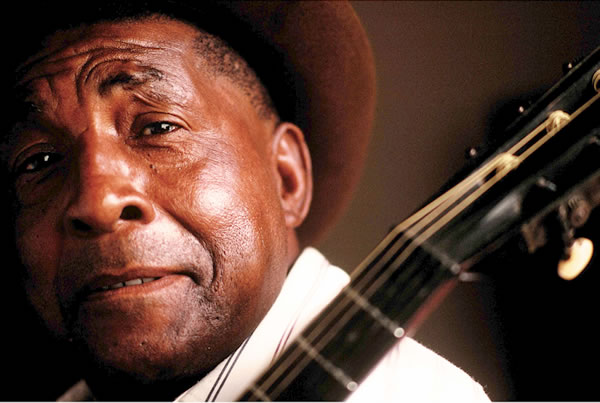
- Jackson in 1986

Background information
- Born: February 24, 1924; Woodville, Virginia, U.S.
- Died: January 20, 2002 (aged 77) Fairfax Station, Virginia, U.S.
- Genres: Piedmont blues
- Occupation: musician
- Instrument(s): Guitar, banjo, vocals
- Labels: Arhoolie, Rounder, Alligator, Smithsonian Folkways

John Jackson (February 24, 1924 – January 20, 2002) was an American Piedmont blues musician. Music was not his primary activity until his accidental "discovery" by the folklorist Chuck Perdue in the 1960s. Jackson had effectively given up playing in his community in 1949.

== Life and career ==
John H Jackson was born into a musical family in Woodville, Virginia, and learned to play the guitar at an early age. He moved to Fairfax, Virginia, in his twenties, where he worked as a gravedigger, among other jobs.

His first recordings were released in the early 1960s by Arhoolie Records. He visited Europe several times, played at folk music festivals, and also recorded for Rounder Records and Alligator Records. He also appeared around Washington, D.C., with the Travelling Blues Workshop, which included Jackson, Archie Edwards, Flora Molton, Mother Scott, and Phil Wiggins and John Cephas.

Jackson died in 2002 of liver cancer in Fairfax Station, Virginia, at the age of 77.

Jackson and his wife, Cora Lee Carter Jackson, had six boys and one girl. He was preceded in death by Cora Lee (1990) and by their sons John Jackson Jr. (1978), Ned Jackson (1978), and MacArthur Jackson (1996). Two of his remaining sons died after him: Lee Floyd Jackson (2006) and Timothy Jackson (2008). His daughter, Cora Elizabeth (Beth) Johnson, and his son James Edward Jackson still live in the Fairfax area.

A historic marker noting the location of Jackson's birthplace was erected by the state of Virginia in Woodville in 2005.

== Musical style ==
Reviewing Jackson's 1978 record Step It Up and Go in Christgau's Record Guide: Rock Albums of the Seventies (1981), Robert Christgau said, "His guitar style is eclectic, as befits a man who got his best songs from Blind Boy Fuller and Blind Blake 78s but who also played in a country band in the early '40s. His voice is guttural yet well-defined. No innovator, and not as arresting through a whole side as he is at the outset, he's nevertheless responsible for the most pleasing (and well-recorded) new country blues record I've heard in years."

== Discography ==
=== Albums ===
- Blues and Country Dance Tunes from Virginia (1965, Arhoolie)
- John Jackson (1966, Arhoolie)
- More Blues and Country Dance Tunes from Virginia: Vol. 2 (1968, Arhoolie)
- In Europe (1970, Arhoolie)
- Don't Let Your Deal Go Down (1970, Arhoolie)
- Step It Up and Go (1979, Rounder)
- Deep in the Bottom (1983, Rounder)
- Country Blues & Ditties (1999, Arhoolie)
- Front Porch Blues (1999, Alligator)
- Rappahannock Blues (2010, Smithsonian Folkways)

== Awards and honors ==
Jackson was a recipient of a 1986 National Heritage Fellowship awarded by the National Endowment for the Arts, which is the United States government's highest honor in the folk and traditional arts.

In January 2011, Jackson's album Rappahannock Blues was nominated in the categories Blues Album and Live Performance Album at the 10th annual Independent Music Awards.
