= Soma (Windhand album) =

Studio album by Windhand
- Released: September 17, 2013
- Genre: Doom metal
- Length: 75:13
- Label: Relapse
- Producer: James Plotkin

Windhand chronology
Reflection of the Negative (2013)	Soma (2013)	Grief's Infernal Flower (2015)

Soma is the second studio album by the American doom metal band Windhand, released on September 17, 2013 by Relapse Records. It peaked at No. 24 on the Billboard Heatseekers Albums chart, making it the band's first release to make a Billboard chart.

== Critical reception ==
Professional ratings
Aggregate scores
Source	Rating
Metacritic	80/100
Review scores
Source	Rating
AllMusic	4/5 stars
Exclaim!	8/10
Metal Injection	8.5/10
Pitchfork	7/10
PopMatters	8/10

Soma was named the third best metal album of 2013 by Rolling Stone.

== Track listing ==
No.	Title	Length
1.	"Orchard"	6:37
2.	"Woodbine"	9:22
3.	"Feral Bones"	7:59
4.	"Evergreen"	6:56
5.	"Cassock"	13:45
6.	"Boleskine"	30:29
Total length:		75:13

== Personnel ==
- Dorthia Cottrell – vocals
- Asechiah Bogdan – guitars
- Garret Morris – guitars
- Parker Chandler – bass
- Ryan Wolfe – drums
