= Archie Edwards =

American Piedmont blues guitarist

- Born: September 4, 1918; Union Hall, Virginia, United States
- Died: June 18, 1998 (aged 79); Seat Pleasant, Maryland, United States
- Genres: Piedmont blues
- Occupations: Guitarist, singer, songwriter
- Instruments: Guitar, vocals
- Years active: 1950s–1998

Archie L. Edwards (September 4, 1918 – June 18, 1998) was an American Piedmont blues guitarist, who in a sporadic career spanning several decades worked with Mississippi John Hurt, Skip James, and John Jackson. His best-known recordings are "Saturday Night Hop", "The Road Is Rough and Rocky", and "I Called My Baby Long Distance". In the late 1950s he owned a barbershop that attracted blues musicians who helped to start his musical career.

Describing his musical style, Edwards said, "I play what they call the old Piedmont style, but I call it East Virginia blues 'cause that's where I learned it".

== Biography ==
Edwards was born on a farm near Union Hall, Virginia. His early work left some time to engage with local musicians, but he had to share his first guitar with his two brothers. Inspired by recordings of Blind Boy Fuller and Blind Lemon Jefferson, he played locally and found employment in a sawmill. In 1937, he relocated to New Jersey, where he worked as a chauffeur, He later worked in a hotel in Columbus, Ohio. Edwards served in the military police during World War II. He struggled to settle in the postwar years and eventually found work as a barber. He opened his own barbershop in Washington, D.C., in 1959. It was frequented by Mississippi John Hurt, and the duo formed a loose working relationship with Skip James, which endured for several years before Hurt's death in 1966. After mourning his friend, Edwards wrote the song "The Road Is Rough and Rocky".

Edwards found more regular work at music festivals and in local clubs. He also joined John Jackson, John Cephas and Phil Wiggins, Flora Molton and Mother Scott, who performed around Washington billed as the Travelling Blues Workshop.

In 1982, Edwards joined the American Folk Blues Festival in a tour of Europe. L & R Records subsequently released Living Country Blues USA, Vol. 6: The Road Is Rough (1982). After returning from touring continental Europe, Edwards teamed up with Eleanor Ellis and Flora Molton. The threesome toured across the United States, Canada and Europe, including Charlie Musselwhite in the entourage in 1987.

Edwards then recorded for Mapleshade Records, releasing Blues 'n Bones in 1989.

Edwards died in Seat Pleasant, Maryland, in June 1998, at the age of 79. The posthumous album The Toronto Sessions is based on work he recorded in Canada in 1986.

== Discography ==
Year	Title	Record label
1981	Living Country Blues USA, Vol. 6: The Road Is Rough	L & R Records
1989	Blues 'n Bones	Mapleshade
2001	The Toronto Sessions	NorthernBlues

== See also ==
- List of Piedmont blues musicians
