= Eternal Return (Windhand album) =

Studio album by Windhand
- Released: 5 October 2018
- Genre: Doom metal
- Length: 62:09
- Label: Relapse Records
- Producer: Jack Endino

Windhand chronology
Windhand / Satan's Satyrs (2018)	Eternal Return (2018)

Eternal Return is the fourth studio album by doom metal band Windhand. It was released on 5 October 2018 by Relapse Records. The album was produced by Jack Endino and is the band's first without founding guitarist Asechiah Bogdan.

== Critical reception ==
Professional ratings
Review scores
Source	Rating
AllMusic	4.0/5 stars
Exclaim!	7/10
Pitchfork	7.9/10

The album has received generally favorable reviews. Pitchfork noted the band's new sense of experimentation with grunge and psychedelic sounds and a compelling performance by singer Dorthia Cottrell, adding that "Cottrell’s often been great on Windhand’s quiet songs, but she’s never sounded like such a convincing rock bandleader." Metal Injection noted that the band has finally found its own style, saying "Windhand returns (eternally) to lift the fog, clear the mist, and define their own obscurities through a fantastic album that properly carves out their identity." The Obelisk also noticed the grunge influence, stating "Windhand aren’t simply donning a flannel and tucking their jeans into their Doc Martens — they’re taking the influence of grunge and working it into their own sonic context, just as they’ve always done with their influences," while Spectrum Culture also noted new strength in Cottrell's vocals.

== Track listing ==
No.	Title	Length
1.	"Halcyon"	8:16
2.	"Grey Garden"	6:31
3.	"Pilgrim's Rest"	3:17
4.	"First to Die"	7:04
5.	"Light into Dark"	2:55
6.	"Red Cloud"	4:15
7.	"Eyeshine"	11:03
8.	"Diablerie"	5:21
9.	"Feather"	13:32
Total length:		62:09

== Personnel ==
- Dorthia Cottrell – vocals
- Garrett Morris – guitar
- Parker Chandler – bass
- Ryan Wolfe – drums

== Charts ==
Chart (2018)	Peak position
UK Rock & Metal Albums (OCC)	28
US Top Current Albums (Billboard)	63
US Heatseekers Albums (Billboard)	3
US Independent Albums (Billboard)	13
US Top Rock Album Sales (Billboard)	22
