= Damn Homie =

Single by Yvngxchris featuring Lil Yachty

from the EP Virality
- Released: May 13, 2022
- Genre: Trap
- Length: 2:20
- Label: Columbia
- Songwriters: Christian Williams; Miles McCollum; Curtis Jackson; Terence Coles; Simon Schranz; John Freeman
- Producers: DeCarlo; Blwyrmind

"Damn Homie" is a song by American rapper Yvngxchris, featuring vocals from fellow American rapper Lil Yachty. It was released on May 13, 2022, by Columbia Records, as the lead single from his debut studio album, Virality (2022). Produced by DeCarlo and Blwyrmind, it samples 50 Cent's 2002 song "Wanksta".

== Background ==
Yvngxchris commented on the song, saying:

"I feel like that separated me from the underground and put me more into a mainstream position. I realized that if I want to be bigger, then I have to think bigger. This song is mixed by Mike Dean, so I feel like that just puts me in a whole different category. I got [Lil] Yachty on the song, too. He's done a lot for the past generation."

== Critical reception ==
Joey Ech of XXL described Lil Yachty's vocals as "energetic".

== Live performances ==
On May 17, 2022, Yvngxchris performed the song as part of Uproxx's Uproxx Sessions series.

== Credits and personnel ==
Credits adapted from Tidal.

- Yvngxchris – composer, lyricist
- Lil Yachty – composer, lyricist
- 50 Cent – composer, lyricist
- John Freeman – composer, lyricist
- DeCarlo – producer, composer, lyricist
- Blwyrmind – producer, composer, lyricist
