= Look n the Mirror =

"Look N The Mirror"

Single by Kashdami

from the album Epiphany
- Released: March 17, 2021
- Genre: Pluggnb
- Length: 1:25
- Label: UMG; Republic
- Producers: Glumboy; Cloudbxy; Lincoln Minaj

Music video
- "Look N The Mirror" on YouTube

"Look n The Mirror" (stylized as "Look N The Mirror") is a song by American rapper Kashdami. It was released through Republic Records on March 17, 2021, as the lead single from his debut studio album, Epiphany. It was written by the Kashdami alongside the song's record producers Glumboy, Cloudbxy, and Lincoln Minaj. It is a pop-punk track characterized by its "soft" and "melodic" flow. A music video directed by 1KarlwithaK premiered in April 2021.

== Background ==
In May 2021, as his tracks gained more traction, Kashdami signed a record deal with Republic Records. "Look N The Mirror" is the breakout single of Kashdami, following its increasing traction online, including social media platforms such as TikTok, the song gained around 18 million Spotify streams. The song currently sits at over 30 million streams as of 2022.

== Critical reception ==
Alphonse Pierre of Pitchfork felt the song put a brand new "twist" on plugg music, writing "Like DMV-area rappers Xanman and Baby Fifty, Ka$hdami has an aggressive, no nonsense flow. Yet instead of gliding on the spare and nightmarish production synonymous with his region, he does so over beats as soft and melodic".

== Credits and personnel ==
- Tana – mixing engineer
- Lincoln Minaj – producing, programmer
- Glumboy – producing, programmer
- Cloudbxy – producing, programmer
