= Virginia, the Home of My Heart =

"Virginia, the Home of My Heart" is a song about Virginia by singer-songwriter Susan Greenbaum. It ran for state song of Virginia in 2015 when a song remembering a time of slavery fondly fell out of favour. It came in second.
