= Union Hall, Virginia =

- CDP
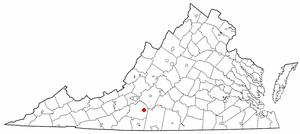
- Location of Union Hall, Virginia
- Coordinates: 37°1′35″N 79°41′31″W
- Country: United States
- State: Virginia
- County: Franklin

Area
  - Total: 18.0 sq mi (46.7 km^{2})
  - Land: 14.5 sq mi (37.5 km^{2})
  - Water: 3.5 sq mi (9.1 km^{2})
- Elevation: 915 ft (279 m)

Population (2010)
  - Total: 1,138
  - Density: 78.6/sq mi (30.3/km^{2})
- Time zone: UTC−5 (Eastern (EST))
  - Summer (DST): UTC−4 (EDT)
- ZIP code: 24176
- Area code: 540
- FIPS code: 51-80000
- GNIS feature ID: 1852918

Union Hall is a census-designated place (CDP) in Franklin County, Virginia, United States. As of the 2020 census, Union Hall had a population of 1,328. It is part of the Roanoke metropolitan area.

== Geography ==
Union Hall is located at 37°1′35″N 79°41′31″W (37.026474, −79.691856).

According to the United States Census Bureau, the CDP has a total area of 18.0 square miles (46.7 km^{2}), of which 14.5 square miles (37.6 km^{2}) is land and 3.5 square miles (9.1 km^{2}) (19.59%) is water.

== Demographics ==
Historical population
Census	Pop.	Note	%±
2020	1,328		—
U.S. Decennial Census; 2000 2010 2020

Union Hall was first listed as a census designated place in the 2000 U.S. census.

As of the census of 2018, there were 1,091 people, 499 households, and 390 families residing in the CDP. The population density was 60.6 people per square mile (23.4/km^{2}). There were 1,103 housing units at an average density of 61.3/sq mi (23.6/km^{2}). The racial makeup of the CDP was 94.2% White, 2.4% African American, 1.7% Asian, and 1.6% from two or more races.

There were 499 households, out of which 6.2% had children under the age of 18 living with them, 71.9% were married couples living together, 3.8% had a female householder with no husband present, and 2.4% had a male householder with no wife present. Non-family households make up for about 21.8%. 20.4% of all households were made up of individuals, and 13.8% had someone living alone who was 65 years of age or older. The average household size was 2.19 and the average family size was 2.42.

In 2018, the population in Union Hall was spread out, with 8.2% under the age of 18, 0% from 18 to 24, 4.3% from 25 to 34, 8.3% from 35 to 44, 12.2% from 45-54, 9.6% from 55 to 59, 16.4% from 60 to 64, and 40.9% who were 65 years of age or older. The median age was 62.4 years. For every 100 females there were 91.7 males. For every 100 females age 18 and over, there were 94.7 males.

The median income for a household in the CDP was $81,181, and the median income for a family was $96,667. The per capita income for the CDP was $54,820. 6.8% of households have an income of less than $10,000.

== Notable people ==
- Norwood Allman, US consular officer, judge and lawyer was born in Union Hall in 1893
- Archie Edwards, the Piedmont blues musician, was born in Union Hall in 1918.
