= Moutheater =

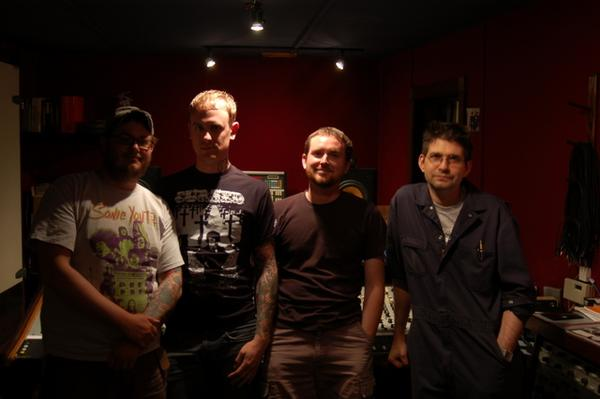
- Moutheater with Steve Albini in 2007 during the recording of Lot Lizard

Background information
- Origin: Hampton and Norfolk, Virginia, U.S.
- Genres: Noise rock, sludge metal, grunge, alternative rock
- Years active: 2007–present
- Labels: Anthems of the Undesirable, Swim Harder Cassettes, Last Anthem Records, Head2Wall Records

Moutheater is an American rock band from Virginia, primarily composed of drummer/recording engineer Tim Gault and songwriter/guitarist Andrew Aircraft. After recording their first 7" with influential engineer Steve Albini during the summer of 2007, the band then began the task of recording the rest of their discography themselves at Tim's Double O Recording.

With a sometimes rotating cast of bass players, the band recorded two full lengths, several ep's, and toured the eastern half of the US multiple times.

Their first full length, Ornament, was released in July 2009, and was featured in Alternative Press, Decibel, and Outburn, as well as other outlets.

After spending a year in the studio throughout 2013 and 2014, their final album, Passing Key, is a culmination of subtle psychedelic influences and their usual early 1990s alternative bedrock.

== Influences ==
Moutheater have cited various influences including Nirvana (band), Swans (band), The Melvins, The Jesus Lizard, Godflesh, Neurosis (band), Scratch Acid, Tad (band), Helmet (band), Failure (band), Cursed (band), The Smashing Pumpkins, Queens of The Stone Age, and His Hero Is Gone.

== Discography ==
- Lot Lizard (2007, 7", Thrashed Records)
- No Ballet (2007, CS/CDr, Swim Harder Cassettes)
- Vegas/Moutheater split (2008, 7", Thrashed Records)
- Thrashed Records Vol. 1 Compilation (2008, CS, Thrashed Records, contributed the song Signs Of Weakness)
- Ornament (2009, CD, Thrashed Records; 2012, LP, Head2Wall Records)
- Colonial (2011, 12", Last Anthem Records)
- Passing Key (2014, LP, Anthems of The Undesirable)

== Members ==
- Andrew Aircraft - Guitar/Vocals (2007–2016)
- Tim Gault - Drums (2007–2016)
- Chris Matthews - Bass/Guitar (2014–2016)
- Seth McPherson - Bass (2016)

== Former members ==
- Brett Mathews - Bass (2009–2010)
- Jeb Black - Bass (2010–2011)
- Aaron F. - Bass (2007-2009), (2012–2014)
- J. Chapman - Bass (2011-2012), Guitar (2012-2014)
