= Florida Avenue Baptist Church =

Coordinates: 38.916018°N 77.020937°W

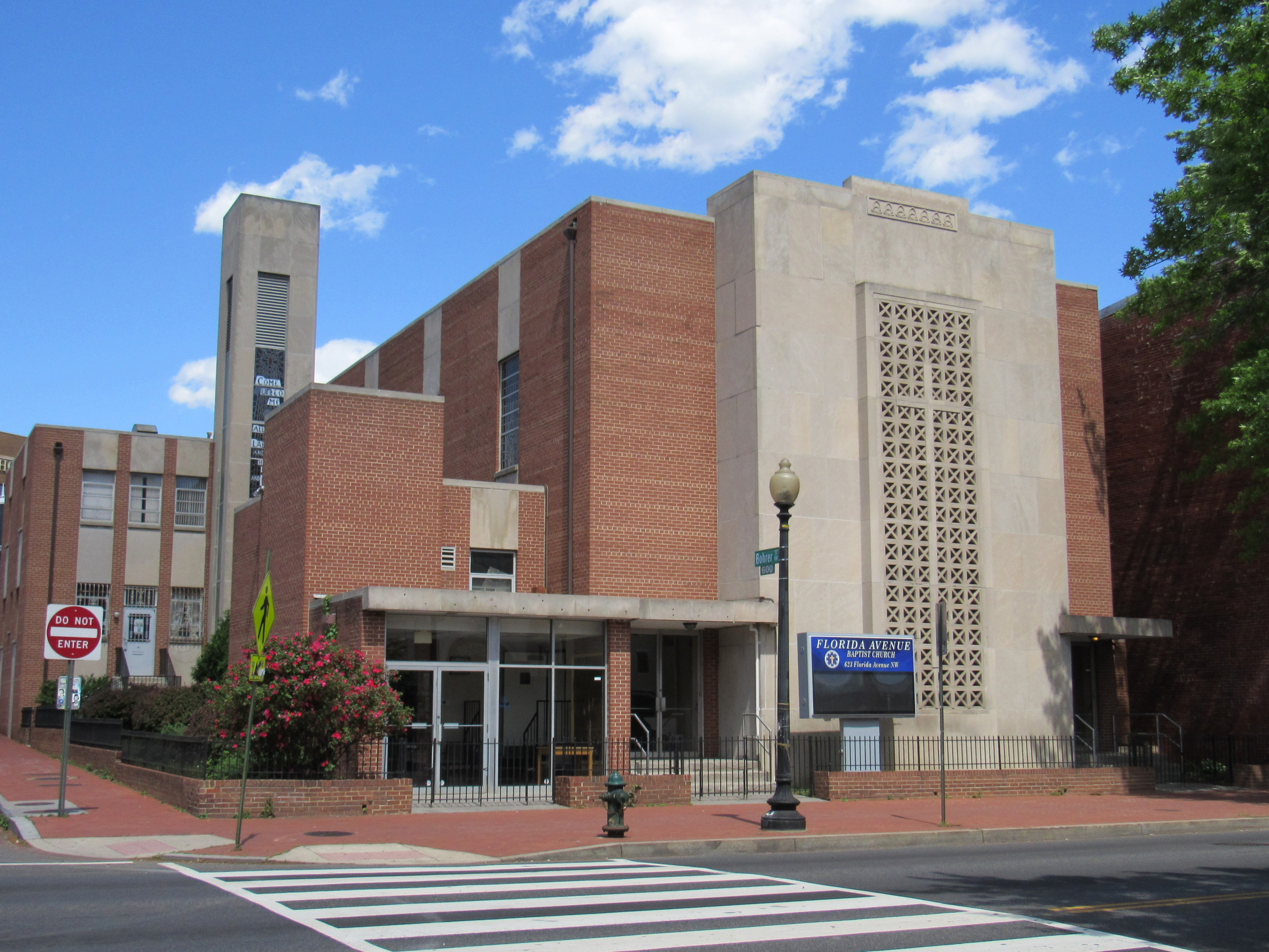
The present day Florida Avenue Baptist Church in Washington, D.C.

Florida Avenue Baptist Church is a Baptist church located in Washington, DC 20001 in the neighborhood of LeDroit Park near Howard University, and adjacent to the historic Howard Theatre. The Reverend Dr. Earl D. Trent, Jr. has served as the church's Senior Pastor since 1995.

== History ==
The church was founded in 1912, after a group of 23 people who decided to withdraw their membership from the Vermont Avenue Baptist Church after a series of events in 1910 and 1911. These 23 people, who named themselves "The Excelsior Circle," took turns meeting at each other's houses until on July 12, 1912, they decided to meet at was then known as Winslow's Hall between 12th & R Streets N.W. and formally organize their own church.

In 2011, the church installed 44 solar panels, in an effort to be a model for other clean energy efforts and to reduce costs. It was the first African American church in Washington to be powered by solar energy and was considered an important first.
