= Home Made (2017 film) =

- Directed by: Shira Meishar
- Written by: Shira Meishar
- Produced by: Lihi Sabag
- Starring: Evgenia Dodina; Yoav Hait
- Cinematography: Arik Kaufman
- Edited by: Tamar Ben Baruch
- Music by: Avi Benjamin
- Release date: 24 May 2017
- Running time: 13 minutes

Home Made (Hebrew: כמו בבית) is an Israeli short film directed and written by Shira Meishar, and produced by Lihi Sabag. The film has been screened at Durban International Film Festival, Sonoma International Film Festival and more.

== Plot ==
A woman who is supposed to be going home to her partner to celebrate her 50th birthday prepares to leave the restaurant where she works. But in the end she stays a little longer and spends the evening with two strangers. A film about the alternative life that resides in each of us.

== Cast ==
Actor	Role
Evgenia Dodina	Helena
Yoav Hait	Stranger
Mark Kroglikov	Boy

== Reception ==
The film won for the Best Script at the Tel Aviv International Student Film Festival. It was nominated at the Palm Springs International Film Festival and semi-finalists in the 44th Student Academy Awards. Evgenia Dodina won a prize for acting in the film at the Actors Festival.
