= DC the Don =

American rapper (born 1999)

DC The Don
- Also known as: DC; Lil Daij; Rag3 Kidd; Donny; Venus
- Born: Daijon Cotty Davis; August 3, 1999 (age 27); Milwaukee, Wisconsin
- Genres: Milwaukee hip-hop; pop; trap
- Occupations: Rapper; singer; songwriter
- Years active: 2017–present
- Labels: Rostrum; Run Music LLC; Republic Records
- Height: 6 ft 7 in (201 cm)

Daijon Cotty Davis (born August 3, 1999), known professionally as DC the Don, is an American rapper and singer from Milwaukee, Wisconsin. He is recognized for mixing elements of hip-hop, rock, and melodic rap in his music. Prior to his rap career, Davis played high school basketball, alongside NBA star LaMelo Ball, as they both participated in the sports program at Chino Hills High School in Chino Hills, California.

== Early life ==
Daijon Davis started writing songs at the age of 8. He recalls dancing to tracks from American singer Michael Jackson during his youth. During his teens, he played basketball with the Amateur Athletic Union, alongside future NBA player LaMelo Ball, and his brothers Lonzo and LiAngelo Ball. In 2018, Davis graduated from Chino Hills High School and was listed as a 3-star recruit by ESPN.

== Career ==
In October 2017, Davis released his single "Everything 1K", which caught the attention of NBA player Lonzo Ball. Davis recalled making the song in ten minutes during an interview with The Source. In February 2019, he released his single "3AM Freestyle" on the WorldStarHipHop YouTube channel. Davis signed to Run Music LLC, but after label issues arose Davis began his departure from Run Music in 2019, starting the hashtag "FREEDC" to draw attention to the feud. He was released from his contract in 2020, and subsequently signed to Rostrum Records. Later that year, Davis' track "Worst Day :(" gained traction following its release on the deluxe version of his debut album Come As You Are.

In late 2021, he released two singles; "Notice Me" and "What Now?".

In January 2022, he was scheduled to perform alongside frequent collaborator Sad Frosty in Houston, Texas, but was unable due to Frosty passing away in the days preceding the performance. In February 2022, he released a single titled "PSA" as the final single for his sophomore album, My Own Worst Enemy. In August 2022, he appeared on American rapper Yvngxchris' album Virality on the track "QuikkSkope". In October 2022, he released a single with American rapper Midwxst titled "Suicide".

On February 23, 2023, DC the Don announced he was going on tour with $NOT. In May 2023, Davis released his third studio album, Funeral, and was later featured as the winner of the tenth freshman slot on the 2023 XXL Freshman List. As of November 2025, Davis is on the God Does Like Tour, headlined by rapper JID. In January 2026, Davis signed with Republic Records.

== Discography ==
=== Studio albums ===
Title	Details
Come As You Are	Released: August 7, 2020; Label: Rostrum, Øutlaw; Format: LP, digital download, streaming
My Own Worst Enemy	Released: February 18, 2022; Label: Rostrum, Øutlaw; Format: LP, digital download, streaming
Funeral	Released: May 5, 2023; Label: Rostrum, Øutlaw; Format: LP, digital download, streaming
Rebirth	Released: October 23, 2024; Label: Rostrum, Letter 5; Format: Digital download, streaming, cassette, vinyl, CD

=== Mixtapes ===
- F*ck Hell (2018)
- DC Dahmer (2018)
- Sacred Heart (2022)
- Sacred Heart 2 (2023)

=== Extended plays ===
- Halloween on 47th Street (2017)
- Thank You Jahseh (2018)
- Just a Kid From Milwaukee (2018)
- DC Run Music (2018)
- DC Fridays (2019)
- Crystal Castles // Smashing Pumpkins // Found You (2023)
- 2012 (2024)
- The Rumors Are True (2026)

=== Singles ===
==== As lead artist ====
Title	Year	Album
"Everything 1K"	2017	Non-album single
"Free Smoke Remix" (with Lonzo Ball)	2017	Non-album single
"Milwaukee"	2017	Halloween on 47th Street
"Mood"	2017	F*ck Hell
"Keep It on the Low"	2017	Non-album single
"GMFU"	2018	Non-album single
"Walk Thru"	2018	Non-album single
"Kill Streak"	2018	Non-album single
"John Cena" (with Sad Frosty)	2018	Non-album single
"That Ain't It Chief" (with B. Lou)	2019	Non-album single
"Red Light" (featuring DDG and Almighty Jay)	2020	DC Fridays and Come As You Are
"Mr. Not Nice"	2020	Come As You Are
"Jesus Can't Save You"	2020	Come As You Are
"Eclipse"	2020	Come As You Are
"Nascar Racer"	2020	Come As You Are
"Campfire Story"	2020	Come As You Are
"Wait Your Turn!"	2020	Come As You Are
"Rag3 Kidd"	2021	Non-album single
"Beavis & Butt-Head" (with Sad Frosty)	2021	Non-album single
"Daij Is Drunk"	2021	Non-album single
"Ghost Rider"	2021	Non-album single
"Megalodon"	2021	Non-album single
"Notice Me"	2021	Non-album single
"What Now?"	2021	Non-album single
"Rerout3" (featuring JetsonMade)	2021	My Own Worst Enemy
"Arrest Me"	2021	My Own Worst Enemy
"PSA"	2022	My Own Worst Enemy
"Hate It or Love It"	2022	Non-album single
"Zombieland"	2022	Non-album single
"Suicide" (with Midwxst)	2022	Non-album single
"All I Know"	2022	Non-album single
"Poison"	2022	Non-album single
"Hate Being Lonely"	2023	FUNERAL
"12AM"	2023	FUNERAL
"Stop Hating"	2023	Non-album single
"Tell Shyanne"	2023	FUNERAL
"Tell Shyanne 2"^{(featuring Iayze)}	2023	Non-album single
"Venus"	2024	Rebirth
"God Level"	2024	Rebirth
"Best Friend Only"	2024	Rebirth
"Fly Enough to Be Virgil"	2024	Rebirth
"Back Road Swangin'"	2025	Non-album single
"Get Naked"	2025	Non-album single
"Lie2Me"	2026	The Rumors Are True
"Riff Raff 2013"	2026	The Rumors Are True
