= Dorthia Cottrell =

American singer (born 1986)

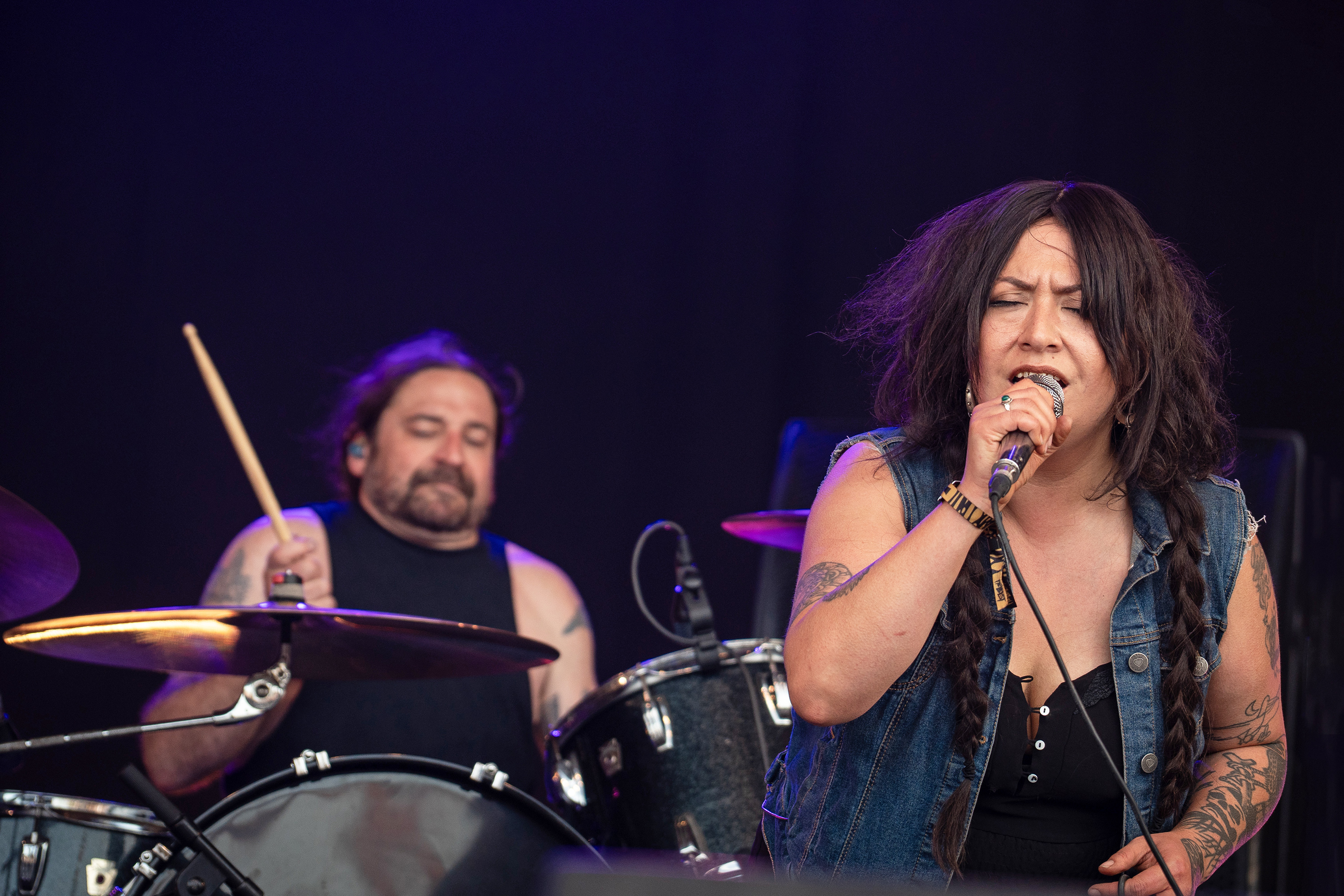
- Cottrell (right) with Windhand at Hellfest 2025

Background information
- Born: March 11, 1986 (age 40)
- Origin: King George County, Virginia, U.S.
- Genres: Doom metal, stoner metal, acoustic
- Occupations: Musician, singer
- Instruments: Vocals, acoustic guitar
- Years active: 2008–present
- Labels: Forcefield, Relapse

Dorthia Cottrell (born March 11, 1986) is an American singer for the doom metal band Windhand. She also has an acoustic solo career.

In 2024, her second solo album, Death Folk Country, was included on the shortlist for the third annual Newlin Music Prize.

== Discography ==
=== With Windhand ===
- Windhand (2012)
- Soma (2013)
- Grief's Infernal Flower (2015)
- Eternal Return (2018)

=== Solo ===
- Dorthia Cottrell (2015)
- Death Folk Country (2023)
