= Woodville, Virginia =

Woodville
- Unincorporated community
- Location within the state of Virginia Woodville (the United States)
- Coordinates: 38°36′24″N 78°10′31″W
- Country: United States
- State: Virginia
- County: Rappahannock
- Time zone: UTC−5 (Eastern (EST))
  - Summer (DST): UTC−4 (EDT)

Woodville is an unincorporated community in Rappahannock County, Virginia, United States. It is located in the southern part of the county.

== Notable people ==
- Eugene McCarthy, politician (1916–2005)
- James J. Kilpatrick, columnist (1920–2010), since moved to Washington, D.C.
- Gerald Hawkins, astronomer (1928-2003), recognized the astronomical significance of prehistorical sites such as Stonehenge
- John Jackson, (1924-2002), famous Piedmont style finger picking blues musician, moved to Fairfax County
- Emily Jane Hilscher, first student killed on April 16, 2007 in the Virginia Tech Shooting
