= Thrax (song) =

Single by SSGKobe

from the EP night before ko
- Released: February 26, 2021 (Note: 22nd on some other platforms.)
- Genre: Hip-hop
- Length: 1:51
- Label: Columbia Records; Sony Music Entertainment; Field Trip Recordings
- Songwriter: SSGKobe
- Producers: Jonio; nateambrose

SSGKobe singles chronology
"Proud" (2021)	"Thrax" (2021)	"Calabasas" (2021)

Music video
- "Thrax" on YouTube

"Thrax" (stylized in all lowercase) is a single released by American rapper SSGKobe on February 26, 2021, through Columbia Records and Field Trip Recordings as the lead single from his EP Night Before Ko (2021), and blew up on TikTok in 2021.

== Background ==
"Thrax" song saw an official release following multiple snippets on TikTok. In 2021, following a meme, the song went viral and garnered millions of streams.

== Credits and personnel ==
Credits adapted from Tidal.

- SSGKobe – composer, lyricist
- Nateambrose – producer
- Jonio – producer
- Vince Ernest Aro – producer, composer, lyricist
