= Homemade (Cephas & Wiggins album) =

Studio album by Cephas & Wiggins
- Released: 1999
- Genre: Blues, Piedmont blues
- Label: Alligator
- Producer: Joe Wilson

Cephas & Wiggins chronology
Goin' Down the Road Feelin' Bad (1998)	Homemade (1999)	From Richmond to Atlanta (2000)

Homemade is an album by the American musical duo Cephas & Wiggins, released in 1999. It was their second album for Alligator Records. The duo supported the album with a North American tour. Homemade was nominated for a W. C. Handy Award for best "Traditional Blues Album".

== Production ==
The album was produced by Joe Wilson, who also cowrote a couple of the songs. Cephas helped write eight of the songs; Wiggins worked on one. Wiggins considered the selections to be enlivening rather than sad or depressing. The album opens and closes with covers of Blind Boy Fuller tunes. "Slow Blues" is a version of the instrumental Reverend Gary Davis song. Two originals, "Jelly Roll" and "Meeting the Mule", explore the differences between life, and women, in the metropolitan North and country South. "I Was Determined" is an autobiographical song about wanting to play the blues after hearing neighbors singing blues standards.

== Critical reception ==
Professional ratings
Review scores
Source	Rating
AllMusic	3/5 stars
The Penguin Guide to Blues Recordings	4/4 stars
Pittsburgh Post-Gazette	3/4 stars
The Star Democrat	6/10
The Sunday Age	3.5/5 stars

The Pittsburgh Post-Gazette wrote that "Cephas plays in ragtime-like guitar rhythms, with Wiggins's airy harp a perfect complement... Cephas's vocals are fittingly light, even though the blues are still the blues." The Sunday Age said that Cephas "succeeds where few have dared, mimicking Skip James's keening vocals and unusual tuning on 'Illinois'." The Toronto Star deemed the album "accessible rural dance music with low-key engaging grooves." The Washington Post determined that Wiggins and Cephas weave "voice and guitar together so seamlessly that one mind seems to govern both mouths and all four arms." The Star Democrat considered the album forgettable and an example of "generic" blues.

AllMusic noted the "rustic, laid-back charm."

== Track listing ==
No.	Title	Length
1.	"Mamie"
2.	"Meeting the Mule"
3.	"Spider Woman"
4.	"Trouble in Mind"
5.	"Jelly Roll"
6.	"Walking Mama"
7.	"A Lot of Them Blues"
8.	"Illinois Blues"
9.	"I Was Determined"
10.	"Sounds of the Blues"
11.	"Worried Life Blues"
12.	"Me and My Chauffeur"
13.	"Slow Blues"
14.	"Leaving Blues"
15.	"Pigmeat"
