= Flora Molton =

American singer

Background information
- Born: March 12, 1908; Louisa County, Virginia
- Died: May 31, 1990 (aged 82) Washington, D.C.
- Occupation: Street singer
- Instrument: Slide guitar
- Years active: 1942–1989

Flora E. Molton (née Rollins; March 12, 1908 – May 31, 1990) was an American street singer and slide guitar player who performed gospel and blues music in Washington, D.C., from the 1940s to shortly before her death. She played slide guitar in the "bottleneck" style commonly employed by rural blues musicians, and she played the harmonica and tambourine.

Born partially blind due to cataracts, Molton grew up in Virginia. Her father was a minister, and she was influenced early by her religious upbringing and by blues musicians such as Bessie Smith. When Molton began performing on the streets of Washington in her thirties, she played blues music. Over the years, she moved away from blues songs, instead performing gospel music and what she called "truth" music, which involved themes of perseverance through life's struggles.

Molton was often accompanied in her street singing by musicians such as Phil Wiggins who had success as mainstream artists, and she sometimes performed with groups under the name Flora Molton and the Truth Band. Fellow musicians noted that the structure of Molton's music was often defined more by her singing than by her guitar.

Molton did not make scheduled performances until 1963, when she met a musician named Ed Morris, who helped her to arrange gigs at music festivals and other venues. She appeared at events such as the Philadelphia Folk Festival, performed at the Library of Congress, and went on a tour of Europe in 1987. Molton is the subject of the documentary Spirit and Truth Music, and she appears in the documentary Blues Houseparty. There are historical markers dedicated to her in Washington, D.C., and on U.S. Route 250 in Virginia.

== Early life ==
Molton was born Flora Rollins on March 12, 1908, in Louisa County, Virginia. Her parents were William and Sally Rollins. She was partially blind at birth. Though she thought that she would be able to read large print, her schoolteachers taught her from memory. At the age of eight, Molton underwent surgery for cataracts, and her vision improved slightly. Though she was still discouraged from reading, by her teens she was comfortable reading large print.

Molton was influenced by religion from an early age. Her father spent most of his time working in West Virginia, both as a minister and as a coal miner. Molton's mother, an organist, stayed behind in Virginia to raise her children. While she listened to blues singers like Bessie Smith and Sippie Wallace as a child, she also learned the accordion, the instrument her father played. She was baptized at age seven and she began preaching at 17. A few years later, Molton became a member of the Holiness Church and started a ministry out of her home.

Supporting two children, Molton found that she could not make enough money by preaching. In 1937, looking for work, she moved to Washington, D.C., where her brother, Robert Rollins, had begun pastoring the Florida Avenue Baptist Church. Molton soon took up the guitar, and she began singing on the streets in 1942.

== Music ==
Playing her guitar, singing, and tapping a tambourine with her foot, Molton occupied the corner of F Street NW and 7th Street NW. She attached a plastic pail to her guitar where passers-by left money. She later incorporated a mount for a harmonica, a microphone and a portable amplifier. Molton sometimes attracted the attention of law enforcement, who did not want her performing on the street, but the police stopped bothering her in the mid-1960s. In 1969, when her usual location was affected by construction for the Washington Metro, Molton moved to the corner of 11th Street NW and F Street NW near the Woodward & Lothrop department store.

Molton sang the blues in her early years on the streets. "I was so young, in a wilder, different life then," she said in 1985. Later, she said she no longer performed the blues, describing her music as a mixture of gospel songs and what she called "truth" music, which dealt with the struggles of daily life. Music scholar Bernice Johnson Reagon said that a blues sound was still apparent in her music in the mid-1970s; she said that, unlike most gospel music, a hymnal structure was absent from Molton's songs. Molton's main concerns were not about structure, but about singing lyrics she viewed as sacred rather than secular. Molton wrote an anti-war piece, "Sun's Gonna Shine in Vietnam Someday", which was later renamed "Sun's Gonna Shine Some Day". Over the years, various musicians accompanied Molton, and these collaborations were sometimes carried out under the name of Flora Molton and the Truth Band. Members of the Truth Band included Phil Wiggins, a blues singer later known as part of Cephas & Wiggins.

Molton played slide guitar in open D tuning. Her guitar technique was described as "bottleneck" because, like many country blues players, she slid a broken bottleneck along the strings to make chord changes. Reagon said that the bottleneck technique created a wailing sound and that her fingering created "a warbled tone". Molton fingered three to four strings at a time and played thirds and sevenths together, producing what Reagon called "a chordal wail with a buzz effect, a quality present in traditional African music."

Ethnomusicologist Mark Puryear said that Molton's songs did not correspond to a typical harmonic blues progression. He said that her guitar playing was "in the service of her singing and the song's primary message." Wiggins said that Molton's unique approach to rhythm and structure made him a better listener. "She didn't really make chord changes so much as much as implied chord changes," Wiggins said. "So the main way to keep track of where she was musically and rhythmically was to follow her voice." Blues guitarist Eleanor Ellis recalled some confusion when she began accompanying Molton. "I was playing and, all of a sudden, I realized we weren't in the same place in the song," Ellis said. "That taught me a real good lesson that the singer is the one to pay attention to."

== Personal life ==
After her first husband, Haywood Bruce, left her around 1930, Molton filed for divorce. Her second husband, Walter Molton, died in the 1970s. She had four children: Bishop William H. Bruce, Johnny Bruce, Sarah Bruce and Doris Anderson. She also had numerous grandchildren and great grandchildren. Molton owned a car. Commenting on Molton's independence in spite of her vision problems, Phil Wiggins described her as "nobody's victim".

In the 1950s, Molton completed a job training program with LightHouse for the Blind, and she tried to find employment outside of street singing. She found a temporary job through Goodwill, but the permanent worker returned shortly thereafter. She received assurances of jobs from other social programs, but no jobs materialized. "You see, I got so many promises," she said in 1974. "I just got disgusted. I just took the street for mine ... but work, no. If it hadn't been for the street, I would have been dead."

A short documentary film about Molton, Spirit and Truth Music, was made by Edward Tim Lewis of Howard University. She was also featured in the documentary Blues Houseparty (1989), produced by Eleanor Ellis. Molton is one of eight women honored by the Downtown DC Business Improvement District on a project that converted unused emergency call boxes into historical markers. There is another historical marker dedicated to her along U.S. Route 250 (Three Notch Road) in Zion Crossroads, Virginia.

== Later years ==
In 1963, Molton met a white guitar player, Ed Morris, who liked her music and began playing with her at her home. Molton had never performed a scheduled gig at that time. Morris began helping her book appearances at local venues and at events such as the 1967 Philadelphia Folk Festival. Molton often played at locales associated with the American folk music revival, such as the Ontario Place Coffee House in Washington's Adams Morgan neighborhood. In addition to booking events, Morris formed part of the Truth Band. He died in the early 1980s, and Eleanor Ellis joined the band in his place.

Molton also performed at venues such as the Library of Congress and at events such as the Smithsonian Folklife Festival. In 1978, the Truth Band drove down to the New Orleans Jazz & Heritage Festival without a booked gig and convinced the organizers to let them play. The Rolling Stones hired Molton as backstage entertainment before a 1981 concert at the Capital Centre. The Truth Band recorded an album titled Living Country Blues USA, Vol. 3 (1981) at Molton's home.

The DC Commission on the Arts and Humanities presented Molton with four awards, and she went on a 1987 tour of Europe. While Molton and Ellis were in Europe, Ocora recorded their album Gospel Songs. The commission gave her a grant to record another album, I Want to Be Ready to Hear God When He Calls (1987). Molton sold copies of her recordings on the street. In 1988, she was selling copies of I Want to Be Ready to Hear God When He Calls for US$6.

By 1988, Molton said she was still singing on the streets to support herself. "I have to do it," she said. "It ain't that I just want to sit out here. I need to." She died at Greater Southeast Community Hospital in Washington on May 31, 1990, after experiencing liver problems. Though she was in her eighties, Molton had continued to perform as a street singer until she got sick about six months before her death. Before she became ill, she had been scheduled for a second tour through Europe. She was buried at National Harmony Memorial Park in Landover, Maryland.

== Discography ==
- 1981: Living Country Blues USA, Volume 3 (with the Truth Band), L+R Records
- 1987: I Want To Be Ready To Hear God When He Calls, Lively Stone Records
- 1987: Gospel Songs (with Eleanor Ellis), Ocora
- 2014: I Want To Be Ready To Hear God When He Calls (CD reissue), Patuxent Music
