= River City Gang =

- Origin: Richmond, Virginia, USA
- Genres: Country
- Years active: 2007–present
- Label: RCG Entertainment
- Members: Sam Hayes; David Phoenix Karns; Brian S. Friedman
- Website: www.rivercitygang.com

Official River City Gang logo

River City Gang is an American country music group and songwriting team founded in Richmond, Virginia. Since its creation, River City Gang has been composed of three members: Sam Hayes (lead vocals), Brian S. Friedman (guitar, vocals) and David Phoenix Karns (Bass Guitar, vocals).

== History ==
River City Gang is a group of musicians, producers, and music industry pros with ties to Richmond, Virginia, a.k.a. the River City. The project began in early 2007, when a fellow music supervisor asked Brian to submit songs to another country music trio for a new album. Brian had been working 10+ years in Los Angeles as a music editor and composer for MTV and movies. Rick had been managing and developing artists while assisting Brian composing for television and film. Brian and Rick are BMI award winning song writers having recorded and composed television theme songs including the theme to MTV's "Punk'd" and "Making the Video"

Brian called his brother Rick to discuss demoing a few songs from their music library. Although Brian was in Los Angeles, and Rick was in Virginia, through technology they were able to cut tracks in both places and simultaneously share info. Once all the music tracks were cut, it was time to record vocals. However, Brian had caught a cold and the brothers were under deadline. They needed someone to cut vocals and someone fast. A few years back, the brothers had worked with Kyle Davis, a singer-songwriter who had released recordings on Virgin Records, Universal, and Windmark. Kyle was a seasoned professional, performing 200+ shows a year. "The Brothers Friedman" as they are referred to in the LA TV World, began thinking of vocalists. They immediately both thought of Kyle. Kyle was an old friend, and they knew he could get the job done. Rick called Kyle who agreed to cut the vocals. The tracks turned out so good, that the trio decided not to even submit the songs to another group, but to keep them for a new a project that would rekindle their love of performing.

Within a few weeks, Brian flew back to Richmond, for a songwriting session. Brian recalls, "I knew we had captured magic the minute we started writing together. Kyle’s Folk and country background totally complemented our country and rock edge."

The band began 2009 opening for Lynyrd Skynyrd on January 2, 2009, at ODU's Ted Constant Convocation Center.

=== Debut album ===
- Volume One Ltd (2008)
