= 929 West Grace Street =

Live music venue

Strange Matter
- '929'
- Former names: Strange Matter, 929, Bagel Czar, Nanci Raygun, Twisters, The Wooden Plate, The Back door
- Address: 929 West Grace St
- Location: Richmond, Virginia, United States
- Events: Punk rock; pop punk; hardcore punk; ska punk; heavy metal; industrial metal; grindcore; hip hop

Construction
- Opened: 1970

929 West Grace Street has been a live music venue in the City of Richmond, Virginia since 1970. Over the years, it has operated under various names. Since the 1980s, it was the hub of Richmond's punk and hardcore scene, and is credited with helping Richmond bands Gwar, Lamb of God, Avail, and Four Walls Falling develop.

== History ==
Before becoming a music venue, the building was home to R.L. Christian, a local grocery store known for manufacturing its own whisky. After the closing of Christian's, the building became a music venue known as 'The Back Door'. It was this incarnation that musician Bruce Springsteen played the club, with an early version of the E Street Band. In the 1980s, it became club called 'The Wooden Plate', and skewed towards Heavy metal music. In the mid-1980s the club became known as 'Twisters', and saw performances from bands such as The Smashing Pumpkins and Green Day. In late 2002, the club became '929', then in 2003, 'Nanci Raygun'.

In 2009, the club became 'Strange Matter', and operated until closing in December 2018.

== Notable performances ==
- Against Me!
- Agent Orange
- Agnostic Front
- Alchemist's Lament
- Atmosphere
- Avail
- Battlemaster
- The Business
- Bruce Springsteen
- Cut The Architect's Hand
- Dinosaur Jr.
- Good Riddance
- Gwar
- Death Piggy
- High on Fire
- Lagwagon
- Lamb of God
- Lightning Bolt
- Mens Room
- My Chemical Romance
- Order
- Peelander Z
- Smashing Pumpkins
- The Treason
- Truman Sparks
- Whatever Brains
- White Cross
