= Satan's Satyrs =

American band

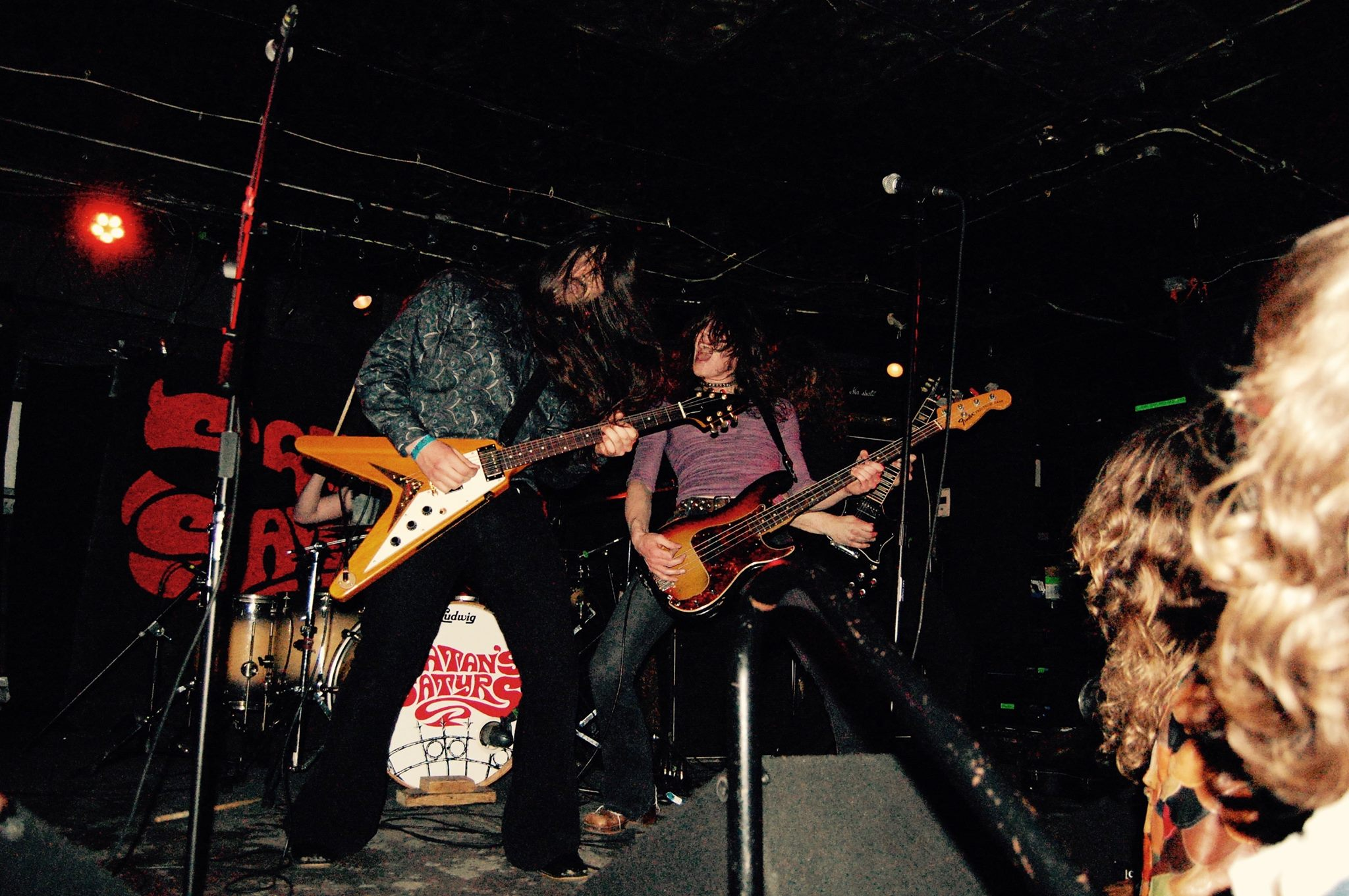

Background information
- Origin: Virginia, United States
- Years active: 2009–2019, 2023-present
- Labels: Bad Omen, Relapse
- Members: Clayton Burgess; Jarrett Nettnin; Russ Yusuf; Morgan McDaniel
- Past members: Stephen Fairfield; Nate Towle

Satan's Satyrs are an American band originally formed in 2009 in Virginia by lead vocalist and bassist Clayton Burgess. The band's lineup as of 2016 included Burgess, Jarrett Nettnin, Stephen Fairfield and Nate Towle. Originally influenced by groups such as Electric Wizard and Black Flag, Burgess mailed a demo tape to Electric Wizard and recorded their first album Wild Beyond Belief, which began with Burgess performing all the instruments while still attending high school. The group began their follow-up album Die Screaming and were invited by Jus Oborn of Electric Wizard to perform at the Roadburn Festival in 2013. Burgess was then offered to join Electric Wizard in 2014 which he accepted. The group has recorded two follow-up albums since along with a split EP with Windhand which charted in Billboard's Top Heatseekers charts.

== History ==
Satan's Satyrs were formed in 2009 in Virginia. Lead vocalist Clayton "Claythanas" Burgess described the idea to form the group formed from hanging out in their basements watching horror films and listening to Black Flag, Electric Wizard, Saint Vitus, Witchfinder General and having the time and to create a band. The band's name was titled after Satan's Sadists which Burgess declared as one of his favorite films of the biker genre, specifically noting the "lawlessness of it. [...] I like the desolation of it, and the freedom of what it would be like to be in a biker gang, riding around the desert and being up to no good."

Burgess mailed Electric Wizard their demo tape as he found them to be "a huge influence." Burgess stated that he first listened to their album Witchcult Today when he was 14 and described their demo tape as a tribute to Electric Wizard.

For their debut album in Wild Beyond Belief! was recorded with all instruments performed by Burgess while he was still in high school. Burgess' goal was to complete the record before graduating high school but ended up completing it until a little after graduation. The album was released in 2012 on At War With False Noise Records.

Before the release of Wild Beyond Belief! Burgess high school friend Jarrett Nettnin joined Satan's Satyrs followed by Stephen Fairfield who became their drummer. In 2013, the group began writing material for their next album Die Screaming in 2014 when they were invited by Jus Oborn of Electric Wizard to play at Roadburn Festival in 2013. Their set at Roadburn included original material and a set of Blue Cheer covers. Burgress would later describe playing at Roadburn as the biggest moment for the group in 2013, stating that "Before Roadburn, we hadn't done too much... we'd done shows, local shows and tiny tours, but playing Roadburn, to a European audience, was just fantastic."

Towards the end of 2013, Burgess was offered to audition as the bassist for Electric Wizard. In February 2015, the group recorded their third album in Nashville. Don't Deliver Us was released in 2015. In 2016, the group added additional guitarist Nate Towle. They then released a split EP (Windhand / Satan's Satyrs) with Windhand in 2018 which was through Relapse Records. This split EP peaked at 11 on the Top Heatseekers on its release.

Clayton Burgess left Electric Wizard in early 2018 to focus on his band Satan's Satyrs. Satan's Satyrs then toured with Windhand in October and November 2018, with a new album titled The Lucky Ones which was released on October 19, 2018, by RidingEasy Records/Bad Omen. Garrett Morris of Windhand produced the album. Satan's Satyrs announced on their Facebook page on July 24, 2019, that the group has disbanded.

Following the groups initial break-up, Burgess had been privately writing and demoing new song until their reunion in 2023. The new group consisted of Burgess, longtime guitarist Nettnin, and new musicians from New York, drummer Russ Yusuf and guitarist Morgan McDaniel. The band heralded their return with 2023's "Quick Quiet Raid" 7" single and 2024's After Dark LP on Tee Pee Records.

== Style ==
Burgess described the band as wanting to have the "speed and aggression of Black Flag" while having a "psychedelic, downtuned, horror infused atmosphere of Electric Wizard" noting that two groups were his favourite bands. Burgess described them as "both equal bands, they had so much in common, but so much different, that I just wanted to explore that area." James Monger of AllMusic described the band as "a high-octane blend of psych-blasted doom metal, grindhouse punk, and sleazy garage rock". Later, the group began incorporating the glam rock influence of groups such as T-Rex, The Sweet, New York Dolls, and KISS.

== Discography ==
- Wild Beyond Belief! (2012)
- Die Screaming (2013)
- Don't Deliver Us (2015)
- The Lucky Ones (2018)
- After Dark (2024)

Split EPs

- Satan's Satyrs / Ohm War (2013)
- Windhand / Satan's Satyrs (2018)
