= Windhand =

American doom metal band

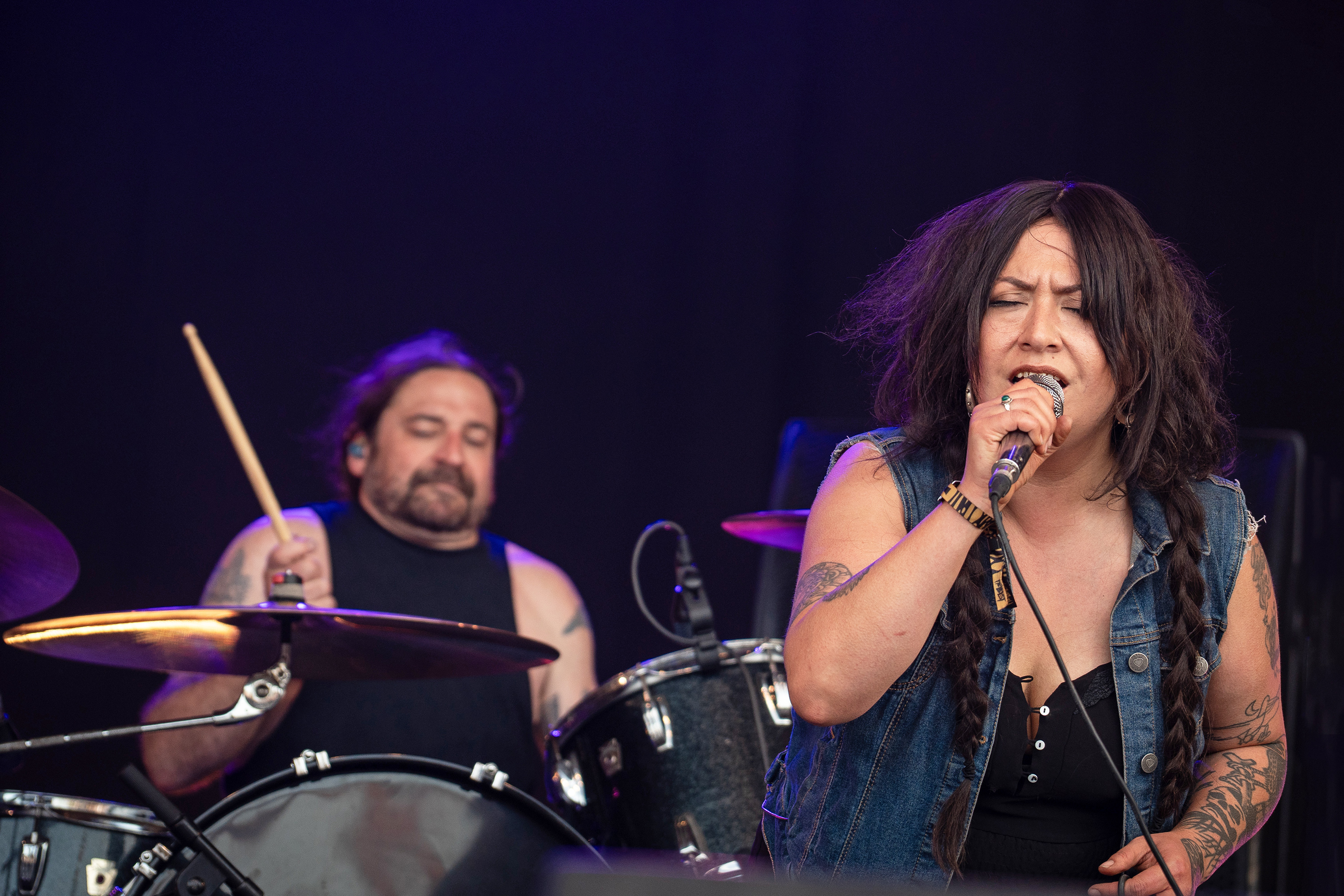
- Windhand, Hellfest, 2025

Background information
- Origin: Richmond, Virginia, U.S.
- Genres: Psychedelic rock; occult rock; doom metal; stoner metal
- Years active: 2008–present
- Labels: Forcefield (2010–2013); Relapse (2013–present)
- Members: Dorthia Cottrell; Garrett Morris; Ryan Wolfe; Leanne Martz; Thomas Hamilton
- Past members: Nathan Hilbish; Jeff Loucks; Asechiah Bogdan; Parker Chandler
- Website: windhand.bandcamp.com

Windhand is an American stoner metal band formed in Richmond, Virginia, in 2008. Currently signed to Relapse Records, Windhand released their most recent album, Eternal Return, in October 2018.

== History ==
Windhand formed in 2008 with singer Dorthia Cottrell, guitarists Asechiah Bogdan (formerly of Alabama Thunderpussy) and Garrett Morris, bassist Nathan Hilbish and drummer Jeff Loucks.

In 2010, they released a two-song demo titled Practice Space Demo. Loucks was then replaced by former The Might Could drummer Ryan Wolfe. The band signed with Forcefield Records and released their eponymous debut album in 2012. Hilbish left the band and was replaced by Parker Chandler. Shortly after, the band left Forcefield and signed to Relapse Records, which released their second album, Soma, in 2013. The album reached No. 24 on the Billboard Heatseekers Albums chart, making it the band's first release to make a Billboard chart, and was named one of the year's best heavy metal albums by Rolling Stone.

In 2013, Windhand released the split album Reflection of the Negative with Cough and another with the band Salem's Pot, simply titled Windhand / Salem's Pot, followed by the live album Live at Roadburn 2014 the next year. In 2015, with Jack Endino as producer, they recorded and released their third album, Grief's Infernal Flower, which peaked at No. 16 on the Billboard Hard Rock Albums chart and No. 7 on the Billboard Heatseekers chart, and was named the 17th-best album of 2015 by Consequence of Sound. Founding guitarist Asechiah Bogdan then left the band and was not replaced.

In early 2018, Windhand released the split EP Windhand / Satan's Satyrs with fellow Virginia band Satan's Satyrs. This EP reached No. 11 on the Billboard Heatseekers Albums chart. Their fourth full-length album, Eternal Return, again with Endino producing, was released in October 2018. That album reached No. 3 on the Billboard Heatseekers Albums chart.

In October 2024, Windhand announced they were partnering with Creep Purple Records to release a limited vinyl pressing of previously unreleased outtakes recorded from 2012 to 2014, entitled Songs From The Satan House.

== Members ==
=== Current members ===
- Dorthia Cottrell – vocals (2008–present)
- Garrett Morris – guitars (2008–present)
- Ryan Wolfe – drums (2010–present)
- Thomas Hamilton – bass (2025–present)
- Leanne Martz – guitar (2025–present)

=== Former members ===
- Nathan Hilbish – bass (2008–2013)
- Parker Chandler – bass (2013–2024)
- Jeff Loucks – drums (2008–2010)
- Asechiah Bogdan – guitars (2009–2015)

== Discography ==
=== Demos ===
- Practice Space Demo (independent, 2010)
- Songs From The Satan House (Creep Purple Records, 2024)

=== Studio albums ===
- Windhand (Forcefield Records, 2012)
- Soma (Relapse Records, 2013) – No. 24 Billboard Heatseekers Albums
- Grief's Infernal Flower (Relapse Records, 2015) – No. 7 Billboard Heatseekers Albums, No. 17 Billboard Tastemaker Albums, No. 16 Billboard Hard Rock Albums, No. 39 Billboard Rock Albums
- Eternal Return (Relapse Records, 2018)

=== Splits ===
- Reflection of the Negative (Relapse Records, 2013) Split LP with Cough
- Windhand / Salem's Pot (RidingEasy Records, 2014) Split LP with Salem's Pot
- Windhand / Satan's Satyrs (Relapse Records, 2018) Split LP with Satan's Satyrs

=== Singles ===
- "Orchard" (Relapse Records, 2013)

=== Live albums ===
- Live at Roadburn 2014 (Roadburn Records, 2014)
- Live Elsewhere (self-released, 2019)
- Levitation Sessions (The Reverberation Appreciation Society, 2020)
