= SSGKobe =

American rapper (born 2003)

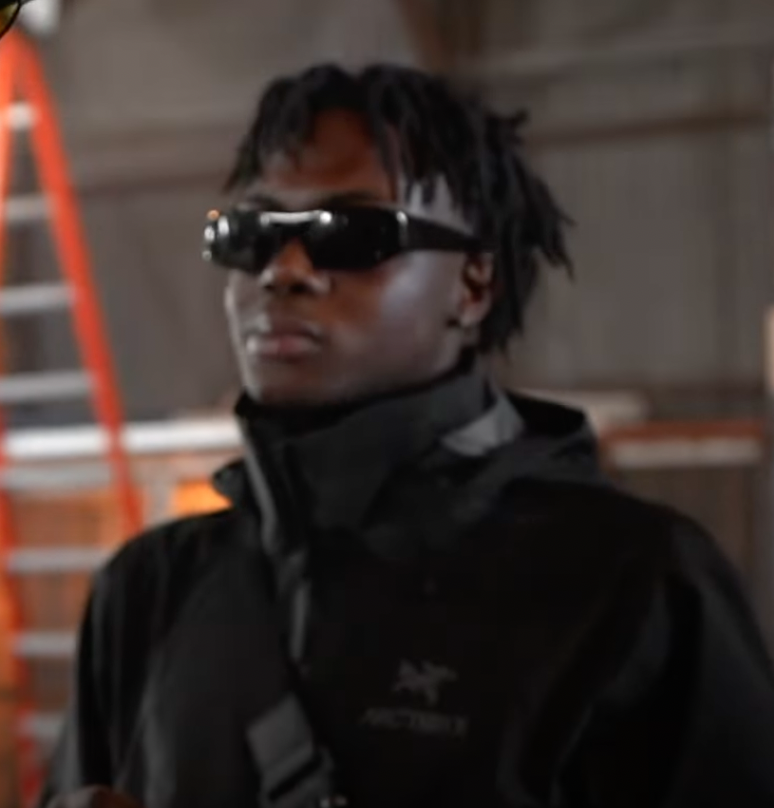
- SSGKobe in May 2023

Background information
- Born: Tyreek Solomon Pellerin; December 2, 2003 (age 22); Lafayette, Louisiana, U.S.
- Genres: Hip hop; trap; emo rap; rage; pluggnb
- Occupations: Rapper; singer; songwriter
- Years active: 2018–present
- Formerly of: Columbia; Field Trip

Tyreek Solomon Pellerin (born December 2, 2003), known professionally as SSGKobe, is an American rapper and singer-songwriter. He gained popularity through his 2021 single "Thrax" which went viral on TikTok. He also gained traction through his multiple collaborations with music video director Cole Bennett.

== Early life ==
Tyreek Solomon Pellerin was born and raised in Lafayette, Louisiana.

== Career ==
=== 2016-2018: Career beginnings ===
Pellerin began making music influenced by his cousins who were also making music and had a home-studio. He recalls being adamant about sharing his music by fear of it not being appreciated by his local community. Pellerin's moniker, SSGKobe, was inspired by Dragon Ball Z, where "SSG" stands for "Super Sayian God".

=== 2021–2022: Breakthrough ===
In February 2021, Pellerin released his breakthrough single Thrax, which would later go viral on TikTok. In April 2021, he released a six-song extended play (EP) titled KO. In November 2021, he released F*K EM, a collaboration with American rapper Lil Yachty. In January 2022, he released a single titled Don't Miss. In March 2022, he released his collaboration with American rapper Trippie Redd titled Escape Your Love. In April 2022, he featured on American rapper and producer Sonny Digital's song Guess What.

== Sexual assault allegations ==
In December 2022, Ka$hkenni, an artist, took to Instagram to accuse SSGKobe of forcing her to have sexual intercourse in a soundproof studio room on November 23, 2022. In January 2023, he denied the accusations against him and said that he was "raised to respect women" in a statement on his official Discord server. In May 2023, he confirmed that Columbia Records dropped him as a result of the allegations coming out.

== Musical style ==
Pellerin is recognized for his Auto-Tune-infused vocals and melody-driven trap music.

== Discography ==
=== Studio albums ===
List of studio albums, with selected details
Title	Album details
HORCRUX	Released: February 23, 2024; Label: Self-released; Formats: Digital download, streaming

=== Mixtapes ===
List of mixtapes, with selected details
Title	Mixtape details
U4 0.5	Released: March 26, 2022; Label: Field Trip, Columbia; Formats: Digital download, streaming
Down To Your Soul	Released: March 2, 2023; Label: Self-released; Formats: Digital download, streaming

=== Extended plays ===
List of extended plays, with selected details
Title	Extended plays details
Symbolization	Released: May 10, 2016; Label: Self-released; Formats: Digital download, streaming
Tranquility	Released: November 1, 2018; Label: Self-released; Formats: Digital download, streaming
Rebirth	Released: December 25, 2018; Label: Self-released; Formats: Digital download, streaming
Farewell	Released: May 5, 2019; Label: Self-released; Formats: Digital download, streaming
Closure	Released: July 3, 2019; Label: Self-released; Formats: Digital download, streaming
THREETWO	Released: August 1, 2019; Label: Self-released; Formats: Digital download, streaming
Love The Hate	Released: September 7, 2019; Label: Self-released; Formats: Digital download, streaming
Project X	Released: October 15, 2019; Label: Self-released; Formats: Digital download, streaming
M3	Released: December 1, 2019; Label: Self-released; Formats: Digital download, streaming
smh	Released: June 26, 2020; Label: Self-released; Formats: Digital download, streaming
night before ko	Released: February 26, 2021; Label: Self-released; Formats: Digital download, streaming
KO	Released: April 23, 2021; Label: Field Trip, Columbia; Formats: Digital download, streaming
Escape	Released: December 31, 2021; Label: Field Trip, Columbia; Formats: Digital download, streaming
Relapsed	Released: July 8, 2022; Label: Field Trip, Columbia; Formats: Digital download, streaming
RAISING KO	Released: January 27, 2023; Label: Self-released; Formats: Digital download, streaming
s e v y n	Released: June 29, 2023; Label: Self-released; Formats: Digital download, streaming
Willows	Released: July 12, 2023; Label: Self-released; Formats: Digital download, streaming
