= Yvngxchris =

American rapper (born 2004)

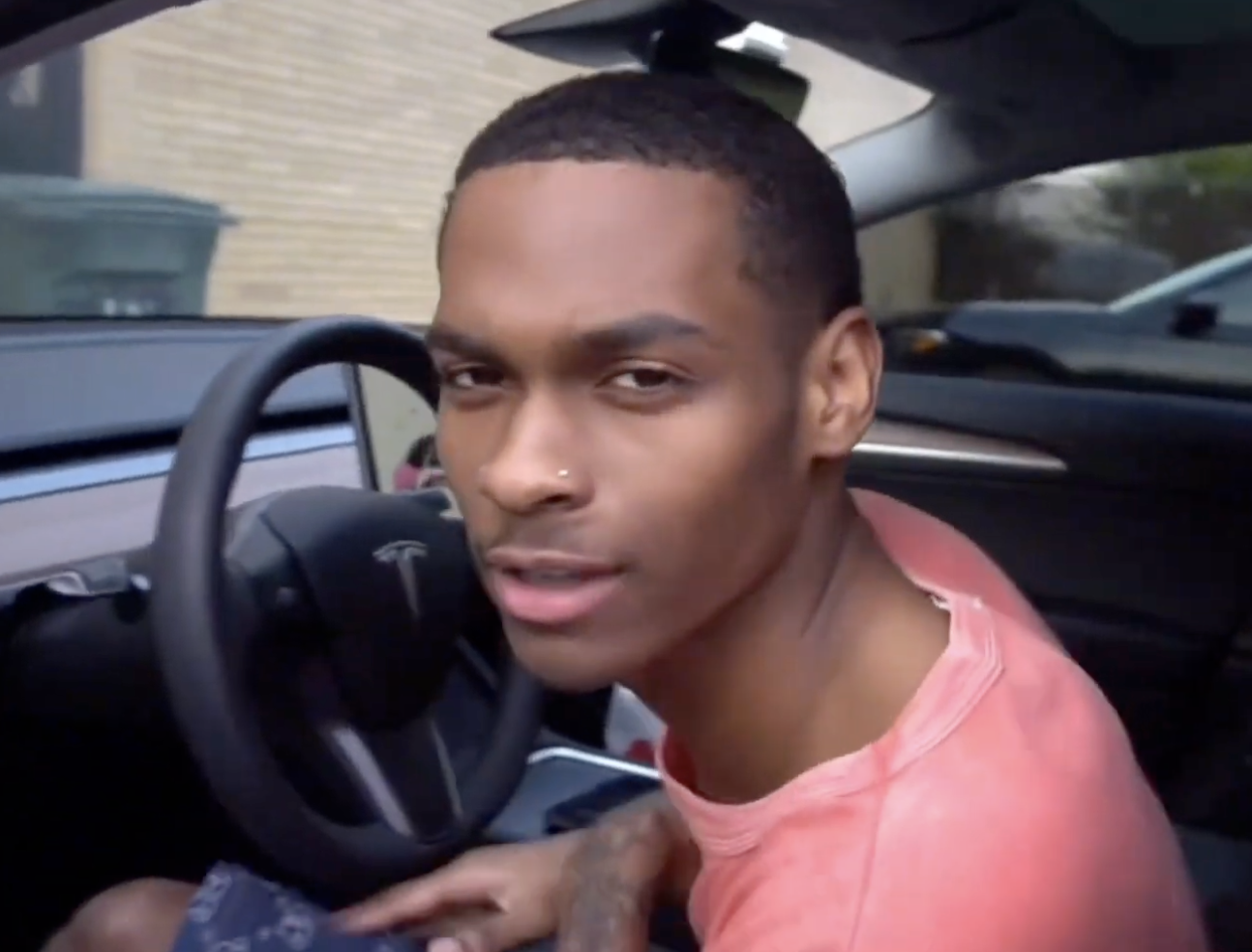
- Williams in 2024

Background information
- Also known as: Yvngxchristucka
- Born: Christian Eugene Williams; November 21, 2004 (age 21); Portsmouth, Virginia, U.S.
- Origin: Chesapeake, Virginia, U.S.
- Genres: Hip hop; trap; plugg
- Occupations: Rapper; singer; songwriter
- Years active: 2017–present
- Label: Columbia (former)

Christian Eugene Williams (born November 21, 2004), known professionally as Yvngxchris (stylized in lowercase; pronounced "Young Chris"), is an American rapper from Virginia. He first gained traction after his 2021 song "Blood on the Leaves" which received traction on TikTok. He was formerly signed to Columbia Records. As of 2024, he streams on Twitch under the username Yvngxchristucka.

== Early life ==
Williams was born in Portsmouth, Virginia. His father works as a project manager, and his mother works as a nurse. When Williams was 6, his family moved to Jacksonville, Florida for a couple of months. He later moved to Chesapeake, Virginia, where he was raised in a middle class home. Chris was known in the community as a nice, thoughtful and caring boy. Growing up, Williams played multiple sports, including basketball, football, and track. He also sang in various musicals put on by his school's drama club. At the age of 17, Williams graduated high school early by taking a GED Test so he could focus full time on making music. During his time at Western Branch High School he was known as "Lil Shrimp".

== Career ==
In 2017, Williams began to rap after being influenced by his father playing hip-hop music around him. During this time, Christian recorded his music via iPhone earbuds. In October 2020, Williams first came to light with the popularity of his song "Kyrie Irving!" on TikTok. In January 2022, he released his most popular song "Off the Leash", with Tana and Luiss. In August 2022, he released an EP titled Virality, which included appearances from Lil Yachty, DC the Don, and Xlovclo. On September 25, 2023, Williams made his Rolling Loud debut. On April 30, 2024, Williams, along with Pusha T and Khi Infinite, released a freestyle for Red Bull Spiral; they were featured on the first episode of season 2. In an interview with DJ Small Eyez, Williams stated how he had a fallout with Columbia Records, stating how he felt like he was a "puppet" under the label. Due to that issue, Williams claimed how he "ghosted" the label and never got back with them. Around the same time, he also dropped his management with Dre the Mayor and Pusha T.

== Personal life ==
Williams cites his biggest inspirations growing up as XXXTentacion, Comethazine, Boy George and Lil Wayne, which he got from his father.

== Musical style ==
Stevenson Altidor of Miami New Times wrote how Williams' "flow is a well-animated Naruto fight scene, with nimble and violent images captured at a blistering pace. A prerequisite to madness is having fun but also being safe".

== Discography ==
=== EPs ===
Title	Album details
Virality	Released: August 19, 2022; Label: Columbia Records; Format: Digital download, streaming

=== Collaborative extended plays ===
Title	EP details
Nothing New (with Yxng Kelo)	Released: May 31, 2021; Format: Digital download, streaming

=== Singles ===
Title	Year	Album
"Bitch I'm Joe Biden"	2021	Non-album singles
"Extravagant"	2021	Non-album singles
"Excuse Me?"	2022	Non-album singles
"Damn Homie" (featuring Lil Yachty)	2022	Virality
"Ain't No Fun"	2022	Virality
"Giig"	2022	Virality
"QuikkSkope" (featuring DC The Don)	2022	Virality
"Shimmy" (featuring DC the Don)	2024	Non-album single

=== Collaborative singles ===
Title	Year	Album
"2much" (YCO Jay Remix) (with YCO Jay)	2021	Non-album singles
"2much!" (with Lil Burnt Ketchup)	2022	Non-album singles
"100" (Yvngxchris Remix) (with Yung Carnage)	2022	Non-album singles
"W" (with Yvngxchris) (with Warren Hue)	2022	Boy of the Year (by Warren Hue)
"Big!" (with Acjxck)	2022	Non-album singles
"Shoot!" (with Acjxck)	2022	Non-album singles
"Nine!" (with Ajxck)	2022	Non-album singles
"2k42!" (Open Verse Remix) (with Xelmiir & Mathiastyner)	2022	Non-album singles
"Jetlag!" (with Xelmiir)	2022	Non-album singles
"Sliding" (with 18iker)	2022	Non-album singles
"Peroxide" (with Chibi LOL)	2022	Non-album singles
