= Ericdoa discography =

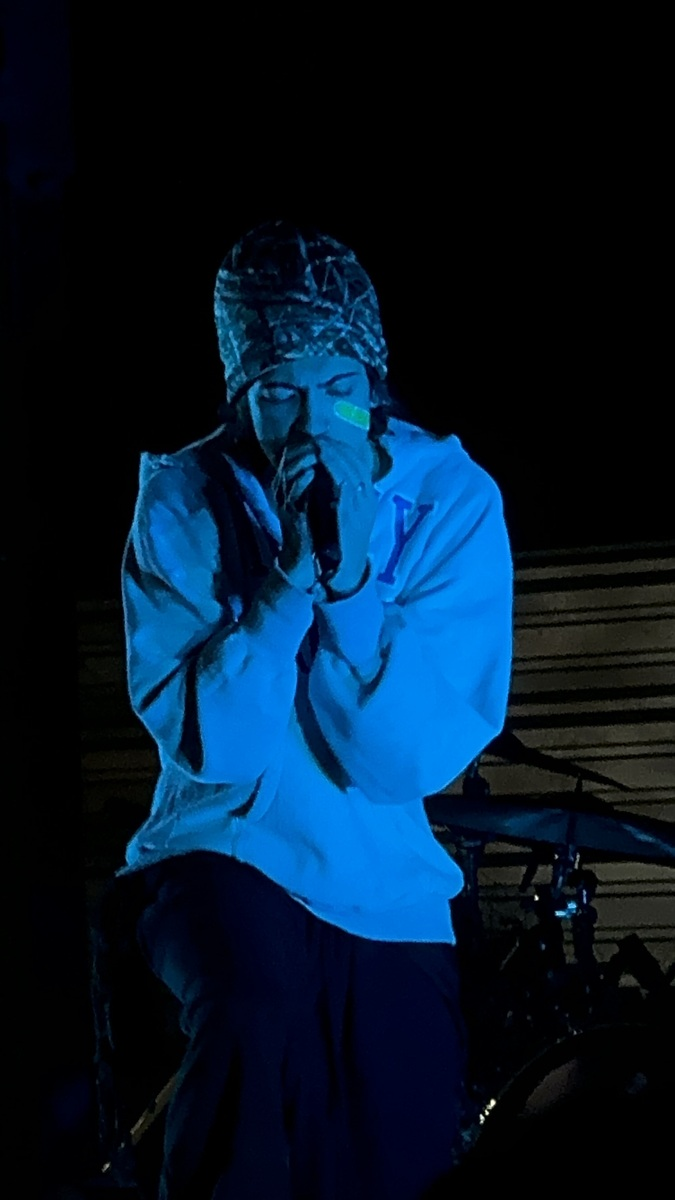
- Ericdoa performing in Tampa, Florida, 2023
- Studio albums: 4
- EPs: 5
- Singles: 51
- Music videos: 15
- Mixtapes: 1
- Single Albums: 1

The discography of American musician Ericdoa consists of four studio albums, five extended plays (EPs), fifty-one singles, fifteen music videos, one mixtape and one single album. Two of the aforementioned EPs and eighteen of his singles were released under the pseudonyms Dante Red, Avon Hill 2004 and deerlover46. Additionally, the music released under all of the pseudonyms had been released independently.

After beginning his career in 2019, Eric released his debut EP DOA under the name "killeric". After gaining traction in 2020 as one of the main artists in the hyperpop and digicore scenes, he would release his debut mixtape, Public Target, his debut album, COA, and his debut single album, Hi, I'm Dante. In 2021, he signed with Interscope Records and Listen to the Kids and released his second EP, Then I'll Be Happy with fellow American musician Glaive. Later that same year, he released two EPs, D.A.N.T.E. and Digital Hate Diary, under Dante Red and Avon Hill 2004, respectively. The following year, Lopez released his second studio album, Things with Wings. In January 2024, he released his debut mixtape, DOA, before releasing his Why Suffer For Us? EP in November 2024 through Listen To The Kids and Santa Anna. His latest album, Música Divino, was released in November 2026.

== Albums ==
=== Studio albums ===
Title	Details
COA	Released: November 6, 2020; Labels: Self-released (initial release); Listen to the Kids, Interscope (re-release); Format: Vinyl, digital download, streaming
Things with Wings	Released: May 20, 2022; Labels: Listen to the Kids, Interscope; Format: Digital download, streaming
DOA	Released: January 19, 2024; Labels: Listen to the Kids, Interscope; Format: CD, digital download, streaming
Música Divino	Released: November 13, 2026; Label: Listen to the Kids; Formats: CD, vinyl, digital download, streaming

== Extended plays ==
=== As Ericdoa ===
Title	Details
DOA	Released: July 7, 2019 (Note: Taken down from all major streaming services shortly after the release of Eric's third studio album of the same name.); Label: Self-released; Format: Digital download, streaming
Then I'll Be Happy (with Glaive)	Released: October 6, 2021; Labels: Listen to the Kids, Interscope; Format: Digital download, streaming
Why Suffer for Us?	Released: November 29, 2024; Label: Listen to the Kids, Santa Anna; Format: Digital download, streaming

=== As Dante Red ===
Title	Details
D.A.N.T.E	Released: February 7, 2021; Label: Self-released; Format: Streaming

=== As Avon Hill 2004 ===
Title	Details
Digital Hate Diary	Released: July 27, 2021; Label: Self-released; Format: Streaming

== Mixtapes ==
Title	Details
Public Target	Released: January 7, 2020; Label: Self-released; Format: Digital download, streaming

== Single albums ==
Title	Details
Hi, I'm Dante	Released: September 30, 2020; Label: Self-released; Format: Digital download, streaming

== Singles ==
=== As lead artist ===
Title	Year	Album
"Sunrise In New York"	2019	Non-album singles
"Mislead" (with Austin Skinner)	2019	Non-album singles
"Hypnagogia"	2019	Non-album singles
"Ifeeldisoriented"	2019	Non-album singles
"Waist Deep in Cold Water"	2020	Non-album singles
"Whatuworried4?"	2020	Non-album singles
"ifhy"	2020	Non-album singles
"badgirlsclub"	2020	Non-album singles
"its all a waste" (featuring glaive)	2020	Non-album singles
"sheaskedwhatmylifeislike"	2020	Non-album singles
"SLiiDE" (with Sebii)	2020	Non-album singles
"movinglikeazombie (remix)" (with umru featuring Sebii, angelus, kmoe, Lewis Grant, savepoint, Tony Velour, emotegi, d0llywood1 and 4kmirage)	2020	Non-album singles
"cloak n dagger" (with glaive)	2021	Then I'll Be Happy
"fantasize"	2021	Non-album singles
"fuck this town" (with glaive)	2021	Then I'll Be Happy
"back n forth"	2021	Non-album singles
"strangers"	2021	Non-album singles
"sad4whattt (From "Euphoria" An HBO Original Series)"	2022	Euphoria Season 2 (An HBO Original Series Soundtrack)
"fool4love"	2022	Things with Wings
"lifeline"	2022	Things with Wings
">one (greater than one)" (with Valorant)	2023	VALORANT Sounds Vol. 1
"kickstand"	2023	DOA
"dancinwithsomebawdy"	2023	DOA
"sweet tooth"	2023	DOA
"search & destroy"	2024	Why Suffer For Us?
"do ya?"	2024	Why Suffer For Us?
"a song for when the bar closes"	2024	Why Suffer For Us?
"Backdoor"	2026	Música Divino
"Agoraphobia"	2026	Música Divino
"Tengo Algo Para Ti"	2026	Música Divino

=== As Dante Red ===
Title	Year	Album	Notes
"movinglikeazombie"	2020	Hi, I'm Dante (Note: While all of the single album's singles were released under Dante Red the final project was released under ericdoa.)	
"himynameisdante"	2020	Hi, I'm Dante	
"Witchcraft Freestyleee" (alternatively titled "witchcraft" on single album)	2020	Hi, I'm Dante	
"HahahaDie#Packwatch"	2020	Non-album singles	
"Suekey #ReplyGuysss"	2020	Non-album singles	
"Villain #RunRunRun"	2020	Non-album singles	
"finale"	2021	Non-album singles	
"test 001"	2022	Non-album singles	
"test 002"	2022	Non-album singles	
"death note" (with h4zrd)	2025	Non-album singles	Originally private on the Dante Red SoundCloud account until a group of hackers got into the account and unprivated it.
"movinglikeazombie acapella"	2025	Non-album singles	Originally private on the Dante Red SoundCloud account until a group of hackers got into the account and unprivated it.
"HelloWorld"	2025	Non-album singles	

=== As deerlover46 ===
Title	Year	Album	Notes
"🦌 FIFTY FIFTY (피프티피프티) - CUPID *DEERMIX*"	2023	Non-album singles	Remix of Fifty Fifty's 2023 single, Cupid
"oh, you don't say?!!"	2024	Non-album singles	
"novocaine"	2024	Non-album singles	
"★♫ SAHBABII VIKING MÚSICADIVINO ♫ ★𓆏"	2025	Non-album singles	Remix of SahBabii's 2024 single, Viking
"Don't Tell Me How To Make My Music, Loser #MUSICADIVINO *FLIP THIS HOE PLEASE*"	2025	Non-album singles	
"Blessed to be the one who rests"	2025	Non-album singles	
"Ninajirachi freestyle"	2026	Non-album singles	
"O.M.A"	2026	Non-album singles	
"ARRANCA PAL CARAJO"	2026	Non-album singles	

=== As featured artist ===
Title	Year	Peak chart positions	Album
Title	Year	US Dance	Album
"BahBahBah" (Sebii featuring ericdoa & Yurmsauce)	2020	—	VVV
"gang+rmx" (Dazegxd featuring ericdoa, anguelus, d0llywood1, Madara TBH, midwxst and Sebii)	2020	—	Non-album singles
"tough (wallflower)" (Dazegxd featuring ericdoa)	2020	—	Daze's Game 3!
"Hardyboyz" (Subsad featuring ericdoa)	2020	—	Non-album singles
"resolve" (kuru featuring ericdoa)	2020	—	Non-album singles
"Decay" (midwxst featuring ericdoa)	2020	—	Secrets
"problem" (Delta featuring ericdoa)	2020	—	Non-album singles
"senta" (twikipedia featuring ericdoa)	2021	—	Non-album singles
"2267" (Kmoe featuring ericdoa)	2021	—	Non-album singles
"boys wanna txt" (daine featuring ericdoa)	2021	—	Non-album singles
"Think You Right" (Whethan featuring ericdoa and glaive)	2021	47	Midnight
"Slide" (midwxst featuring Slump6s & ericdoa)	2021	—	BACK IN ACTION
"San Francisco Blues" (Note: Remix. The original song did not feature Eric and was released as part of juno's EP "last year alive".) (juno featuring ericdoa)	2024	—	Non-album singles

== Guest appearances ==
Title	Year	Other artist(s)	Album
"Pick Sides" (Note: Uncredited additional vocals)	2023	The Kid Laroi	The First Time (Deluxe)

== Music videos ==
Song	Year	Director
"2008"	2020	Daniel Jordan K
"deep end"	2020	Daniel Jordan K
"fantasize"	2021	Oliver Cannon
"Cloak n Dagger" (with glaive)	2021	Jake Nanez
"Fuck This Town" (with glaive)	2021	Unknown
"back n forth"	2021	Oliver Cannon
"mental anguish" (with glaive)	2021	Dito
"strangers"	2021	Dito
"heather" (with glaive)	2021	Dito
"sad4whattt (From "Euphoria" An HBO Original Series)"	2022	Oliver Cannon
"fool4love"	2022	ayodeji
"victim"	2022	Unknown
"kickstand"	2023	Neve Abcari
"dancinwithsomebawdy"	2023	Joe Weird
"search & destroy"	2024	Neve Abcari
"Soundwhore"	2026	Neve Abcari
