= Back in Action 3.0 =

EP by Midwxst
- Released: September 7, 2022
- Recorded: 2022
- Genre: Trap; Hip-hop
- Length: 22:47
- Label: Simple Stupid; Geffen
- Producer: Aldn; CGM Beats; Chenzo; CookUpMason; Cooper Vengrove; DxnnyFxntom; Eli.yf; Enrgy Beats; Maajins; Midwxst; Mimofr; Paulo; RAFMADE; Rio Leyva; Scizzie; ThankYouWill; Turro; Zuko

Midwxst chronology
Better Luck Next Time (2022)	Back in Action 3.0 (2022)	E3 (2023)

Singles from Back in Action 3.0
- 1. "Redacted" Released: May 13, 2022

Back in Action 3.0 is the fifth extended play (EP) by the American singer and rapper Midwxst. It was released by Simple Stupid and Geffen Records on September 7, 2022. The album serves as a sequel to his third extended play Back In Action (2021), and features guest appearances by BabyTron and Tana.

Back in Action 3.0 is a hip-hop EP that features elements of trap. It was supported by one single, a tour across the United States, and a headline show in London, England. The album would rise in popularity following the gaining traction of "223's".

== Background ==
Midwxst released his fourth extended play (EP) Better Luck Next Time (2022) The project’s lead and only single, “Redacted,” was released on May 13, 2022, originally as a SoundCloud exclusive. He was influenced by rappers such as XXXTentacion, Juice Wrld, Tyler, the Creator. Back in Action 3.0 would be released on September 7, 2022 through Simple Stupid and Geffen Records.

== Release and promotion ==
On October 7, 2022, a month after the EP’s release, midwxst announced on Twitter the 3.0 TOUR, with Dro Kenji being the opener for the majority of the tour. The tour began on November 11, 2022 in Montclair, New Jersey and concluded on December 3, 2022 in San Francisco, California. A music video for the standout track, "223's" was directed by Griffin Olis, finding BabyTron and Midwxst in a car dealership. Back in Action 3.0 is the third installment of Midwxst's Back In Action series. Midwxst would then appear in London, United Kingdom for a headline show.

== Critical reception ==
Following Midwxst's appearance in London, Back in Action 3.0 would receive a review from The London Pit. Tibbits would write "Engrossing aesthetically, midwxst’s nuance for atmospheric angst is at full tilt here. It’s a tape that aims to do one thing; flaunt.".

== Track listing ==
No.	Title	Writer(s)	Producer(s)	Length
1.	"Nineteen"	Edgar Sarratt; Christian Montaya; Zachary Cassell	Zuko; Midwxst; CGM Beats	3:07
2.	"223's" (Featuring BabyTron)	Sarratt; Alden Robinson; James Johnson; Mason Kochis; Marlon Brown	CookUpMason; Aldn; Enrgy Beats	2:13
3.	"Mad"	Sarratt; Vincenzo Donato; Daniel Carter Aranson	Chenzo; DxnnyFxntom	2:16
4.	"Home Run"	Sarratt; Maximo Silverman; Eli Kahler; Olli Turro	Eli.yf; Turro; Mimofr	2:33
5.	"Redacted"	Sarratt; Semaj Nelson	Maajins	2:00
6.	"No Trace"	Sarratt; Addison Rineer; Cooper Vengrove	Rafmade; Cooper Vengrove	2:26
7.	"Infantry"	Sarratt; Rineer; Jake Mercier	Scizzie; Rafmade	1:56
8.	"Basic"	Sarratt; Christian Montoya; Rio Leyva; William Lambert	CGM Beats; Rio Leyva; Thankyouwill	3:42
9.	"Flag" (Featuring Tana)	Sarratt; Rineer; Paulo Cornejo; Steven Lewis	Paulo; Rafmade	2:31
Total length:				22:47

== Personnel ==
Credits adapted from Tidal.

- CGM Beats – production, programming (1, 8)
- Maajins – production, programming (5)
- Ryan Rajagopal – assistant mixer
- Paulo – production, programming (9)
- Addison Rineer – songwriting
- Aldn – production, programming (2)
- Rafmade – production, programming (6, 7, 9)
