= Back in Action =

Back in Action may refer to:

- Back in Action (1994 film), a 1994 Canadian action film
- "Keel VI: Back in Action", a 1998 studio album
- Looney Tunes: Back in Action, a 2003 American live-action/animated comedy film
  - Looney Tunes: Back in Action (video game), a 2003 platform game based on the movie of the same name
- Dhoom 2: Back in Action, a 2006 Indian Hindi-language action thriller film
- Back in Action (2011 film), a 2011 Malayalam-language Indian film
- Jagged Alliance: Back in Action, a 2012 video game
- "Back in Action" (EP), an extended play (EP) by the American singer and rapper Midwxst, 2021
- Back in Action (2025 film), a 2025 American action comedy film
