= Ready or Not (Brakence song) =

"ready or noT"

Single by Brakence

from the album marroW
- Released: September 25, 2026
- Genre: Hyperpop; glitchpop
- Length: 4:02
- Label: Columbia Records; Sony Music
- Songwriters: Randall Findell; Wyatt Otis; Jack Obrocki
- Producers: Brakence; Otis; Obrocki; 50landing

Brakence singles chronology
"Bugging!" (2022)	"ready or noT" (2026)	"Crystallized" / "Death Roll" (2026)

Music video
- "ready or noT" on YouTube

"Ready or Not" (stylized as "ready or noT") is a song released by American singer-songwriter and rapper Brakence. It was released on September 25, 2026, through Sony Music and Columbia Records as the lead single from his third studio album, Marrow. The song was his first release since the 2022 album Hypochondriac.

== Background and release ==
On September 16, after a nearly four-year long hiatus, two accounts with the name "jesterforgetter" took to both the Brakence Discord and Reddit, claiming to have information on the whereabouts of Brakence. Users originally shunned the posts, thinking they were part of an elaborate troll, however, later that day the accounts would return with a set of two coordinates, one in New York, and one in Los Angeles. Fans would eventually make their way to these coordinates, where they found posters captioned "have you seen brakence?" with a QR code on them. The QR code led to a website with the URL, still-here.world, depicting only a door, that upon interacting with, played an unheard snippet of a song.

4 days later, on September 20, Brakence would go live on TikTok for roughly 13 minutes, featuring 2 puppets sitting in front of a red curtain accompanied by strange noises. These noises played for nearly the entire livestream, until close to the end, where a voice could suddenly be heard speaking. Once the dialogue had finished both puppets were dragged off the sides and the livestream abruptly ended.

Three days later on September 23, Brakence would take to all social media platforms to announce the title and release date of "Ready or Not", alongside a snippet of the song.

The song was released two days later on September 25. It is the eighth track on Brakence's third studio album, Marrow.

== Production and composition ==
Brakence wrote "Ready or Not" alongside Wyatt Otis and Jack Obrocki, and produced it with the help of Otis, Obrocki, and long-time collaborator and friend, 50Landing. Brakence mixed the track himself, and the mastering was handled by Joe LaPorta.

"Ready or Not" is 4 minutes and 2 seconds long. It is a hyperpop track with two sections, the first featuring loud 808 drums, synthesizer-heavy production, and tons of glitch elements that make it akin to phonk music, with the second section of the track having a more electric guitar-oriented sound, but still keeps a lot of key elements from the first section of the song. Declan McDonell of The Badger Herald described the production of the song as having a "heavy, energetic and chaotic vibe".

The song's lyrics tell the story of the fictional world depicted in the ARG rollout, with many references to characters such as Jester, Butcher, and M, as well as references to the visuals shown in the music video. Some lyrics also directly contrast other lyrics from Brakence's last album Hypochondriac, such as the lyric "Advance the judge above the law", being very similar to some of the lines from "Argyle", the lead single from Hypochondriac.

== Music video ==
The music video for "Ready or Not" was directed by rapper and producer Quadeca, who has collaborated with Brakence in the past. Brakence previously featured on Quadeca's song "A La Carte". The music video premiered on the same day as the song, and features Brakence being taken control of by a sentient glove, causing him to experience hallucinations of Jester and Butcher, and eventually leading Brakence to a door that upon opening transports him to a white room featuring models of all the areas seen in the video. The video ends with a strange alien-like creature walking through space, accompanied by a snippet of a new song.

== Charts ==
Chart performance for "Ready or Not"
Chart (2026)	Peak position
New Zealand Hot Singles (RMNZ)	17
US Hot Rock & Alternative Songs (Billboard)	43
