= Brakence =

American musician (born 2001)

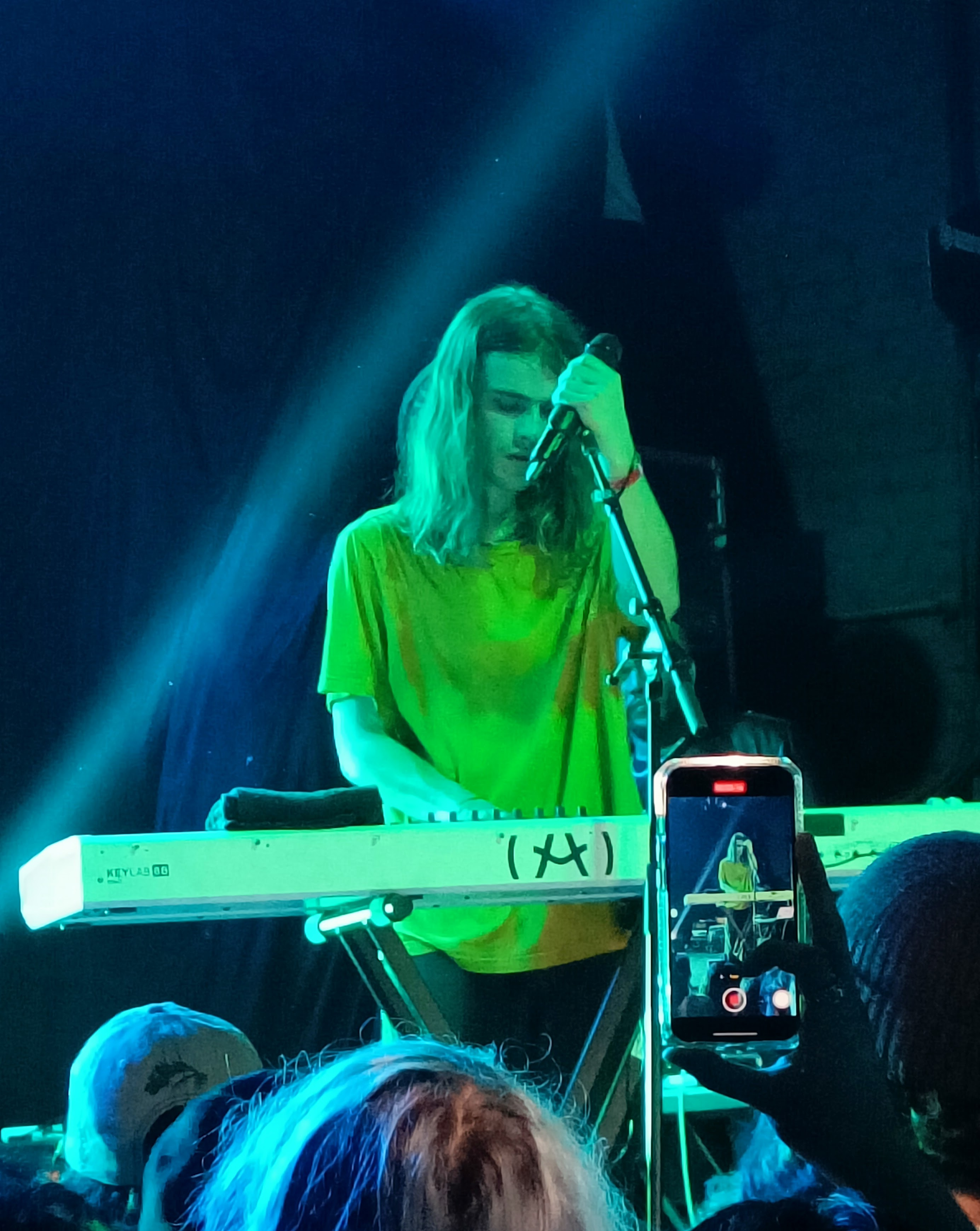
- A photo of Brakence at his concert in Dallas on December 10, 2022. Brakence in December 2022
- Born: Randall Todd Findell; December 17, 2001 (age 24)
- Education: Ohio State University (dropped out)
- Occupations: Musician; singer; rapper; songwriter; record producer
- Musical career
- Origin: Columbus, Ohio, U.S.
- Genres: Pop; electronic; hyperpop; emo rap; Midwest emo; emo pop; digicore
- Instruments: Vocals; piano; guitar
- Years active: 2016–present
- Labels: Columbia; Sony Music; Svnset Waves
- Website: brakence.com

Randall Todd "Randy" Findell (born December 17, 2001), known professionally as Brakence (stylized "brakence"), is an American singer-songwriter, rapper, record producer and musician from Columbus, Ohio who is currently signed to Columbia Records and Sony Music. He is known for his hyperpop-influenced style which has been described as a mixture of Midwest emo and emo rap, and his use of both baritone and falsetto vocals.

== Early life and career ==
Randall Findell was born on December 17, 2001. He was raised in Columbus, Ohio. He developed his musical skills throughout his childhood and adolescence, having been in choir as well as taking jazz piano lessons. Brakence began uploading his work to music sharing platform SoundCloud in 2016 and released the EP FifthEnigma on the site in December of that year. In 2018, he released his debut commercial EP Hypnagogia, which incorporated lo-fi hip-hop beats and emo-style vocals. In 2019, he released the EP Bhavana, and dropped out of Ohio State University, inspiring his 2020 single "Dropout".

He later released his debut album Punk2, which would be considered his breakthrough release, signing to Columbia Records in April 2020. Findell would release multiple singles including Argyle in 2021. In December 2022, he released his second album Hypochondriac under Columbia Records and Sony Music. In 2025, he would feature on "Sleepwalker" by Aries.

On October 23, 2026, Findell released his studio album marroW, which served as his first studio album release since 2022's Hypochondriac. In support of the album, Findell will embark on "The marroW Tour," which is scheduled to start on March 3, 2027, and ends on June 4, 2027.

== Discography ==
=== Studio albums ===
List of albums, with selected details
Title	Album details
Punk2	Released: March 26, 2020; Label: Self-released (initial release), Columbia Records/Sony Music (re-release); Format: Digital download, streaming
Hypochondriac	Released: December 2, 2022; Label: Columbia Records/Sony Music; Format: CD, digital download, streaming
marroW	Released: October 23, 2026; Label: Columbia Records/Sony Music; Format: Digital download, streaming

=== Extended plays ===
List of extended plays, with selected details
Title	EP details
FifthEnigma	Released: December 13, 2016; Label: Self-released; Format: Digital download
Hypnagogia	Released: April 27, 2018; Label: Svnset Waves; Format: Digital download, streaming
Bhavana	Released: August 7, 2019; Label: Self-released; Format: Digital download, streaming

=== As lead artist ===
Title	Year	Peak chart positions		Album
Title	Year	US Rock	NZ Hot	Album
"Nervosa2"	2017	—	—	Non-album singles
"Nerd"	2018	—	—	Non-album singles
"FourthStrike"	2018	—	—	Non-album singles
"Effort"	2018	—	—	Non-album singles
"LoveSong//Slacker"	2018	—	—	Non-album singles
"Favors//Mess"	2018	—	—	Non-album singles
"Sunder"	2018	—	—	Non-album singles
"Clouded" / "Veldt"	2019	—	—	Non-album singles
"BoyWontCry"	2019	—	—	Bhavana
"Softie"	2019	—	—	Bhavana
"Rosier" (alternatively titled "Rosier/Punk2" on album)	2020	—	—	Punk2
"Fuckboy"	2020	—	—	Punk2
"FWB"	2020	—	—	Punk2
"Dropout" (solo or featuring Blackbear)	2020	—	—	Punk2
"SauceInTheRough"	2020	—	—	Punk2
"Argyle"	2021	—	—	Hypochondriac
"CBD"	2022	—	—	Hypochondriac
"Venus Fly Trap"	2022	—	—	Hypochondriac
"Caffeine"	2022	—	—	Hypochondriac
"Bugging!"	2022	—	—	Hypochondriac
"ready or noT"	2026	43	17	Marrow
"Crystallized" / "Death Roll"	2026	—	23	Marrow
"Crystallized" / "Death Roll"	2026	—	35	Marrow
"Problem Child"	2026	—	32	Marrow
"Bite" / "Body"	2026	—	—	Marrow

=== As featured artist ===
Title	Year	Release
"Always Make It Work" (Devon Rea featuring Brakence & Slowsun)	2018	Devon Rea
"I Don't Mind" (Devon Rea featuring Brakence)	2019	Winter Winds Vol. 6
"Alone" (Marco featuring Brakence)	2019	Insert Tape Three
"Re:Birth" (50Landing featuring Brakence)	2019	Non-album single
"Pains" (50Landing featuring Brakence)	2019	Growing Pains
"Well Known" (Atlas in Motion featuring 50Landing & Brakence)	2020	Light Leaks
"I Know" (Marco featuring Brakence)	2020	Non-album single
"ThingsUDo2Me" (Ericdoa featuring Brakence)	2020	COA
"Okay" (Midwxst featuring Brakence)	2022	Better Luck Next Time.
"Athena" (Jedwill featuring Login & Brakence)	2023	Non-album single
"A La Carte" (Quadeca featuring Brakence)	2023	Scrapyard
"Brightness of Vega" (Colliding with Mars featuring Brakence)	2024	Time to Meet God
"Media is God" (Colliding with Mars featuring Brakence)	2024	Time to Meet God
"Sleepwalker" (Aries featuring Brakence)	2025	Glass Jaw

== Tours ==
=== Headlining ===
- The marroW Tour (2026)
