= Charlie Heat =

American record producer (born 1989)

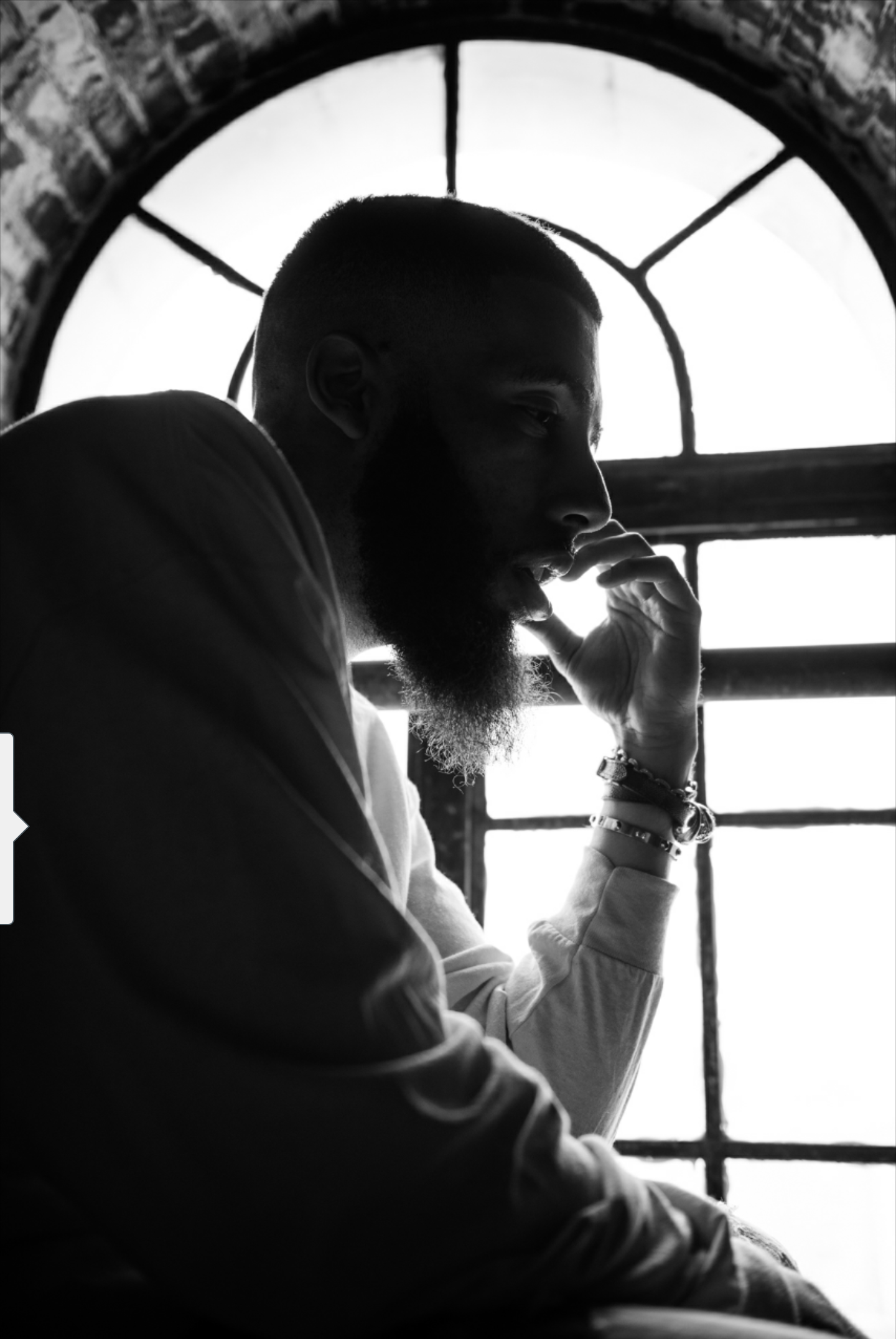
- Brown in 2017

Background information
- Born: Ernest Eugene Brown III; November 10, 1989 (age 36); Woodbury, New Jersey, U.S.
- Genres: Hip-hop; trap; R&B; pop; soul
- Occupations: Record producer; songwriter; record executive
- Instruments: FL Studio; Logic Pro X
- Years active: 2011–present
- Labels: Very GOOD Beats; Columbia; House of 99

Ernest Eugene Brown III (born November 10, 1989), known professionally as Charlie Heat, is an American record producer. He signed with Very GOOD Beats, the in-house production wing of Kanye West's GOOD Music in 2015. During and after his departure from the label in 2018, he has been credited on releases for artists including Denzel Curry, Lil Uzi Vert, Tommy Genesis, Madonna, Midwxst, Ty Dolla Sign, Young Buck, J. Cole, Gucci Mane and Travis Scott, among others. Charlie Heat is the only producer named on the track list for West's album The Life of Pablo (2016), on its song "Facts" (Charlie Heat version).

== Early life ==
Brown was born in Woodbury, New Jersey on November 10, 1989. His mother was an immigration lawyer and his father was a musician. Early on in life, Brown was highly interested in basketball and music. Allen Iverson was a muse for the young boy. According to Brown, his father highly influenced his musical interest, and while they attended a viewing of Drumline, Brown decided to solely focus on music. He attended Clark Atlanta University on a musical scholarship as a part of the drumline at HBCUs. It was here that he received the alias "The Human Torch", which would later transform into Charlie Heat.

== Influences ==
Michael Jackson, Earth, Wind & Fire, Selena and Rick James have been cited as influences, and inspired him through their musical works. There is a noticeable Latin sound in the works of Charlie Heat, as evident in the song "Undercover", and this influence is partly due to his interest in music from Mexican-American vocalist Selena, and Cuban vocalist, Celia Cruz, a notable Cuban singer. Charlie had piano instruction by his father at an early age, and this was a positive influence that has helped shape the talented producer into a great force in the recording industry.

== Critical reception ==
HotNewHipHop wrote of Heat's "impressive production discography", praising "Facts" (Charlie Heat version) from The Life of Pablo.

Danny Schwartz wrote about Heat's remix of Gucci Mane's song "Trap House" saying of it, "His remix of the song is the standout of his new 5-track EP of remixes, Till August."

Bryan Hahn wrote that "Charlie Heat is a name you’ll be seeing a lot more of in 2017." Hahn also wrote: "He’s been consistently delivering quality remixes." In a later article, Hahn wrote that, "Charlie Heat had a great 2016. And he’s not kicking back to rest on his laurels."

Christopher Harris, writing in HipHopDx, calls him "...an upstart beat-maker who has already worked on tracks for Madonna, Pusha T, Kanye and Vic Mensa."

James Elliott, writing for Complex, said that "Charlie Heat might not be on your radar yet, but he will be when this year is over."

== Awards and nominations ==
=== Grammy Awards ===
Year	Nominee / work	Award	Result	Ref.
2016	"All Day"	Best Rap Song	Nominated	
2017	"Famous"	Best Rap Song	Nominated	

== Discography ==
=== Solo discography ===
Year	Title	Artist	Album
2016	"IIB" (Charlie Heat version)	Charlie Heat	Till June
2016	"MMW" (Charlie Heat version)	Charlie Heat & Ant Beale	Till June
2016	"PONY" (Charlie Heat version)	Charlie Heat	Till June
2016	"PANDA" (Charlie Heat version)	Charlie Heat	Till June
2016	"DAT $TICK" (Charlie Heat version)	Charlie Heat	Till August
2016	"MIND BLOWING" (Charlie Heat version)	Charlie Heat	Till August
2016	"K.I.F.Y.B." (Charlie Heat version)	Charlie Heat	Till August
2016	"F.A.L" (Charlie Heat version)	Charlie Heat	Till August
2016	"PRETTY BOY" (Charlie Heat version with CritaCal)	Charlie Heat	Till August
2017	"Dirty Taurus"	Charlie Heat	No Rain No Flowers
2017	"WTN"	Charlie Heat	No Rain No Flowers
2017	"Crazy Again"	Charlie Heat	No Rain No Flowers
2017	"Pardon Me"	Charlie Heat	No Rain No Flowers
2017	"10K"	Charlie Heat & Ant Beale	No Rain No Flowers
2017	"Sunshine"	Charlie Heat	No Rain No Flowers
2019	"Have a Good Time"	Charlie Heat & Syd	Non-album single

=== Production discography ===
Year	Title	Artist	Other producer(s)	Album
2011	"Work 'Em"	Young Savage		Non-album single
2012	"ABP"	Lecrae		Church Clothes
2012	"Spazz"	Lecrae		Church Clothes
2012	"Breaker Breaker"	Young Buck		Tha City Paper
2012	"Collect Call"	Young Buck		Tha City Paper
2012	"Out My Mind"	Young Buck		Tha City Paper
2013	"You Know It's Me"	Dark Lo		Non-album single
2014	"Uzi"	Lil Uzi Vert		The Real Uzi
2014	"We On It" (ft. Lee Mazin)	Lil Uzi Vert	Lee Mazin	The Real Uzi
2014	"Trunk Got Birdies"	Lil Uzi Vert		The Real Uzi
2014	"Senor Guapo"	Lil Uzi Vert		The Real Uzi
2014	"Asian Chicks"	Lil Uzi Vert		The Real Uzi
2014	"Plugged In"	Lil Uzi Vert		The Real Uzi
2014	"Lunch Money"	Pusha T	Kanye West	Non-album single
2015	"Piss on Your Grave"	Travis Scott	Kanye West, Mike Dean, Darren King, Noah Goldstein, Travis Scott	Rodeo
2015	"Illuminati"	Madonna	Kanye West, Mike Dean, S1, Travis Scott	Rebel Heart
2015	"Holy Water"	Madonna	Mike Dean, Kanye West	Rebel Heart
2015	"Wash All Over Me"	Madonna	Avicii, Mike Dean, Kanye West	Rebel Heart
2015	"Money Counter"	Two-9		B4FRVR
2015	"Banned from TV"	Lil Uzi Vert		Luv is Rage
2015	"WDYW"	Carnage, ASAP Ferg, Lil Uzi Vert, Rich the Kid	Carnage	Papi Gordo
2016	"Mase in '97"	Carnage, Lil Yachty		Non-album single
2016	"Cute"	DRAM		Big Baby D.R.A.M.
2016	"Famous"	Kanye West	Kanye West, Havoc, Noah Goldstein, Andrew Dawson, Hudson Mohawke, Mike Dean, Plain Pat	The Life of Pablo
2016	"Waves"	Kanye West	Kanye West, Metro Boomin, Mike Dean, Hudson Mohawke, Anthony Kilhoffer	The Life of Pablo
2016	"Feedback"	Kanye West	Kanye West, Noah Goldstein	The Life of Pablo
2016	"Facts" (Charlie Heat version)	Kanye West	Kanye West	The Life of Pablo
2016	"U Mad"	Vic Mensa, Kanye West	Smoko Ono, Mike Dean, Kanye West, Stefan Ponce	Non-album singles
2016	"Prolly"	Sevyn Streeter (ft. Gucci Mane)		Non-album singles
2016	"Champions"	Kanye West, Big Sean, Travis Scott, Gucci Mane, Desiigner, Yo Gotti, Quavo	Lex Luger, A-Trak, Kanye West, Mike Dean, Fonzworth Bentley, Noah Goldstein	Non-album singles
2016	"Isabellae"	Higher Brothers		Black Cab
2016	"Campaign" (Charlie Heat remix)	Ty Dolla Sign, Future	D.R.U.G.$.	Campaign
2016	"Watching"	Ty Dolla Sign, Meek Mill	Darnell Got It, CritaCal	Non-album single
2016	"That’s All" (Charlie Heat remix)	Gucci Mane		Till August
2016	"Knuck If You Buck" (Charlie Heat remix)	Crime Mob		Till August
2016	"Freek-A-Leek" (Charlie Heat remix)	Petey Pablo		Till August
2016	"Pretty Boy Swag" (Charlie Heat remix)	Soulja Boy		Till August
2016	"Dat $tick" (Charlie Heat remix)	Rich Chigga		Till August
2017	"Undercover"	Kehlani		SweetSexySavage
2017	"I Don't Wanna Leave"	Tdot illdude		Morning Comes Too Fast
2017	"Running with the Torch"	Tre Capital		I Can't Die
2018	"SUMO | ZUMO"	Denzel Curry		TA1300
2018	"Tommy"	Tommy Genesis		Tommy Genesis
2018	"100 Bad"	Tommy Genesis		Tommy Genesis
2018	"Play With It"	Tommy Genesis	Darnell Got It	Tommy Genesis
2018	"You Know Me"	Tommy Genesis	Dez Wright	Tommy Genesis
2018	"Rainbow"	Tommy Genesis	JJared	Tommy Genesis
2018	"Miami"	Tommy Genesis	Matty Busco, Yas	Tommy Genesis
2019	"Aloha"	Denzel Curry		Non-album single
2019	"Wish"	Denzel Curry, Kiddo Marv		Zuu
2021	"Take_it_Back_v2" (Charlie Heat version)	Denzel Curry, Kenny Beats		Unlocked 1.5
2023	"Old Me"	Midwxst	Austin Corona, Drew Drucker, Drew Dvorsky, Romil Hemnani, Sophie Gray, Wyatt Bernard, Zuko	E3
2024	"Sked"	Denzel Curry, Kenny Mason, Project Pat		King of the Mischievous South Vol. 2
2024	"Still in the Paint"	Denzel Curry, Lazer Dim 700, Bktherula	Mickey De Grand IV	King of the Mischievous South
