= Trying (Midwxst song) =

Single by Midwxst

from the EP Summer03
- Released: November 20, 2020
- Genre: Hyperpop; hip-hop
- Length: 2:01
- Label: Geffen; Simple Stupid
- Songwriters: Edgar Sarratt; Logan Cartwright; Ryland Kelly
- Producers: Elxnce; Thislandis

Midwxst singles chronology
"By Your Side" (2020)	"Trying" (2020)	"Ruthless" (2021)

Music video
- "Trying" on YouTube

"Trying" is a song by the American musician Midwxst from his second extended play (EP) Summer03 (2021). It was released by Geffen and Simple Stupid Records on November 20, 2020, as the EP's lead single. The song went viral online and gained attention on social media platforms such as TikTok, which rose Midwxst to prominence and led him sign a record deal with Geffen Records. The song was written by Midwxst, Elxnce, and Thislandis, with Comstock handling the production and Malvin serving as a co-producer.

Music critics identified "Trying" as being an hyperpop and hip-hop song, while being influenced by multiple other genres, including emo. The track is driven by acoustics and an abrasive beat drop. In its lyrics, Midwxst his discusses his feelings of abandonment and his struggle with depression. Music critics had enjoyed "Trying" for its rap and digicore sound. A music video directed by Daniel Jordan of Overcast was released in March 2021, and depicts Midwxst in different areas subject to destruction.

== Background and release ==
Midwxst had begun releasing music to SoundCloud. Towards the beginning of the COVID-19 pandemic, he would become involved in the early hyperpop scene. In September 2020, "By Your Side" featuring Canadian musicians 8485 and Blackwinterwells. "Trying" was later released as the lead single from Midwxst's second extended play (EP) Summer03 (2021). A music video for the song directed by Daniel Jordan was released on the Overcast channel and has since then surpassed over 1 million views. Following the success of the track gaining virality online, which was considered a turning point in his career. Midwxst had later signed a record deal with Geffen Records. The song currently sits at over 31 million streams on Spotify.

== Composition ==
Sarratt wrote "Trying" alongside its producers and engineers, Thislandis and Elxnce. "Trying" is 2 minutes and 1 second long; it is a hyperpop song that draws from a variety of genres, including emo and hip-hop. Its production contains a "festival-ready" beat drop and acoustics; Pitchfork's Alphonse Pierre had compared the latter of which to the work of Rylo Rodriguez. The song's lyrics explores themes of mental health.

== Critical reception ==
"Trying" had received universal acclaim. Multiple critics deemed the song as Midwxst's breakout single. Writing for Pitchfork, Alphonse Pierre had wrote that "Melodrama strengthens Midwxst, he vents on 'Trying'." He felt that he balanced "a blank sense of humor with his relatable blend of frustration, disappointment, and apathy." Explaining that Midwxst's vocals "liquefy" into different sides of the production—"the acoustics soft hearted enough to be comparable to a Rylo Rodriguez ballad and the anarchic festival-ready drop—but he always sounds on the brink of snapping. Pierre felt that "this whirlwind of emotions is what makes Midwxst's music so effective." XXL Magazine's Robby Seabrook felt that "Trying" was a rap song that was "formatted like an emo track".

== Credits and personnel ==
Credits taken from Tidal.

- Midwxst – vocals, songwriting
- Elxnce – production
- Thislandis – production
- Logan Cartwright – songwriting
- Ryland J. Kelly – songwriting
