= Better Luck Next Time (EP) =

Better Luck Next Time.

EP by Midwxst
- Released: March 16, 2022
- Recorded: 2021
- Genre: Rap
- Length: 20:07
- Labels: Simple Stupid; Geffen
- Producers: 1Chai; Brakence; Downtime; Dreamboy Oscar; Dylan Brady; Elxnce; Ericdoa; Glasear; Jack Schrepferman; Lunamatic; Mochila; Ninetyniiine; Nömak; Sam Keller; Skress; Whethan; Yungspoiler; Zetra

Midwxst chronology
Back in Action (2021)	Better Luck Next Time. (2022)	Back in Action 3.0 (2022)

Singles from Better Luck Next Time
- 1. "Riddle" Released: February 2, 2022; 2. "I Know You Hate Me" Released: February 23, 2022

Better Luck Next Time is the fourth extended play (EP) by American singer and rapper Midwxst. It was released by Simple Stupid and Geffen Records on March 16, 2022. The album contains a sole feature from Brakence and serves as a follow-up to his earlier extended play (EP), Back In Action (2021). Better Luck Next Time was supported by two singles and an EP announcement video directed by Parker Corey.

== Background and composition ==
Midwxst would gain popularity in the underground digicore scene, releasing a string of albums in 2022. Later embarking on a tour with fellow musician Glaive. When recording Better Luck Next Time, Sarratt had the goal of straying away from his usual sound. The album contains a sole feature from Brakence with Midwxst saying that [they] brought a different kind of "spirit" to the project. Better Luck Next Time explores themes of breakup, and the variety of emotions that come from breaking up. Better Luck Next Time was supported by two singles "Riddle" and "I Know You Hate Me". The lead single, "Riddle", would be released on February 2, 2022 followed by "I Know You Hate Me" on February 23, 2022. The album would later be released on March 16, 2022, through Simple Stupid and Geffen Records. The album serves as a follow-up to his earlier extended play (EP), Back In Action (2021).

== Critical reception ==
Professional ratings
Review scores
Source	Rating
Pitchfork	7/10

Following its release, Better Luck Next Time received a generally positive review from Brady Brickner-Wood writing for Pitchfork who said Midwxst continues to polish his "frenetic" breed of pop-trap while maintaining a fundamental weirdness that’s neither too loud nor too discreet. While Pitchfork's Hattie Lindert would comment on the musical style calling it a "nimbly eclectic" mode of pop-trap. Will Schube of uDiscover Music said the EP showcases Midwxst's "sonic" versality on the tracks "Riddle" and "I Know You Hate Me".

== Track listing ==
No.	Title	Writer(s)	Producer(s)	Length
1.	"Better Luck Next Time"	Edgar Sarratt; Darby Bouey; Nathan Chen	Ninetyniiine; Downtime	1:08
2.	"Riddle"	Sarratt; Eric Revel Wood; Ethan Snorek	Lunamatic; Whethan	1:49
3.	"I Know You Hate Me"	Sarratt; Logan Cartwright	Elxnce	2:07
4.	"Car Seats"	Sarratt; Sam Keller; Jack Schrepferman; Livia McKee	Sam Keller; Jack Schrepferman	2:21
5.	"Switching Sides"	Sarratt; Alain Cartaya; Eric Lopez; Liam Magrini; TK Ong	Ericdoa; 1Chai; Glasear; Mochila; Zetra	2:44
6.	"Misery"	Sarratt; Cartaya; Cayde Allchin	Mochila; Skress	2:06
7.	"Step Back"	Sarratt; Dylan Brady; Nicolas Petitfrere	Nömak; Dylan Brady	2:51
8.	"Okay" (Featuring Brakence)	Sarratt; Wood; Randall Findell	Lunamatic; Brakence	2:35
9.	"On My Mind"	Sarratt; Jane Pampollonia; Oscar Santander; Cooper Shelton; Ava Beathard; McKee	Dreamboy Oscar; Yungspoiler	3:28
Total length:				20:07

== Release history ==
Region	Date	Format(s)	Label	Edition	Ref.
Worldwide	March 16, 2022	Streaming; digital download	Simple Stupid; Geffen	Original	
