= Think You Right =

Single by Whethan featuring Ericdoa and Glaive

from the album Midnight
- Released: September 17, 2021
- Recorded: 2021
- Label: Atlantic
- Producers: Kimj; Glasear; Whethan

Ericdoa singles chronology
"Back n Forth" (2021)	"Think You Right" (2021)	"Strangers" (2021)

Glaive singles chronology
"Detest Me" (2021)	"Think You Right" (2021)	"Prick" (2021)

Whethan singles chronology
"Fuck This Town" (2021)	"Think You Right" (2021)	"The Internet" (2021)

"Think You Right" is a song by American DJ Whethan featuring singers Ericdoa and Glaive, released on September 17, 2021, through Atlantic Records. It is the lead single off of Whethan's second studio album Midnight (2022).

== Background and release ==
After Whethan earned a top-five spot on Dancing Astronaut‘s Top Albums of 2020 with his debut studio album Fantasy. "Think You Right” would be released on September 17, 2021 through Atlantic Records as the lead single for Whethan's second studio album Midnight (2022). Whethan would later embark on his Swimming With The Clouds Tour.

== Critical reception ==
Farrell Sweeny writing for Dancing Astronaut said the track is "an interesting combination, with heavy electronic influence and synthesized vocals suspended amid pop-guided production." Mike Ali of This Song Is Sick felt the song was "filled with glittering synths, trap-inspired drums," alongside "vocal harmonies" from both artists.

== Charts ==
Weekly chart performance for "Think You Right"
Chart (2021)	Peak position
US Hot Dance/Electronic Songs (Billboard)	47
