= E3 (album) =

Studio album by Midwxst
- Released: September 1, 2023
- Genre: Pop-trap
- Length: 34:14
- Label: Geffen
- Producer: Aaron Shadrow; Alex Goldblatt; Austin Corona; Charlie Heat; Dejuan Cross; Drew Drucker; Drew Dvorsky; Elxnce; Hunter Madrid; Isaac Rose; Jeff Hazin; Psymun; Roark Bailey; Romil Hemnani; Sophie Gray; Wyatt Bernard; Zachary Cassell; Zuko

Midwxst chronology
Back in Action 3.0 (2022)	E3 (2023)	Back in Action 4.0 (2024)

Singles from E3
- 1. "Pretty Girls" Released: July 7, 2023; 2. "Warning" Released: August 4, 2023

E3 is the debut studio album by the American rapper and singer Midwxst. It was released by Geffen Records on September 1, 2023, as the follow up to his fifth extended play (EP), Back in Action 3.0 (2022). The album consists of pop-trap, notably softer than Midwxst's previous work. Most of the album was co-written and produced by Drew Drucker and Sophie Belle Grajcer, among other collaborators. Other producers include Charlie Heat, Psymun, and Romil Hemnani.

The project was promoted through two singles—"Pretty Girls" and "Warning"—as well as two accompanying tours. Upon release, E3 received widespread critical acclaim from online publications. It was conceptualized by Midwxst when he had created a notepad with the scrips and ideas that would then become the album.

== Background and release ==
In an interview with Genius, Midwxst said the album had "been in [my] head since [I] was 17", with him having kept "a full notepad in [my] phone with the script for the interludes on the project and the ideas that eventually became E3." He called the album an "emotional journey through the mistakes [I've] made as a person and that 'E3', the protagonist of the story, is constantly facing and having to finally come to terms with." The album's name was first announced on July 7, 2023, with the release of lead single "Pretty Girls". The single came with a music video directed by Ari Nissenbaum which features Midwxst and different women in various highly saturated scenarios. Midwxst revealed the album's release date and cover art on July 12. On August 4, Midwxst released the second single, "Warning". The album was released on September 1 by Geffen Records.

== Composition ==
E3 consists of a "nimbly eclectic mode of pop-trap", with layers of rock and gospel, and softer melodies than his previous hyperpop and rage rap work. The album is also said to be "a rollercoaster that takes you through the sounds of hip-hop, pop, rock, hyperpop, and emo rap." Midwxst is said to have a "pop-punkesque vocal quality".

== Reception ==
E3 ratings
Review scores
Source	Rating
Clash	6/10
Pitchfork	6.5/10

Clash's Robin Murray said the album gives "a feeling of tentative step forward, rather than radical leaps." Pitchfork's Hattie Lindert wrote that the album "positions Midwxst not as a Playboi Carti heir, but a pop star in his own right." HotNewHipHop's Zachary Horvath said that Midwxst "really tries so many different things" with the album, and that "it is one thing to try, but he succeeds here." The Fader's Arielle Lana LeJarde said the album "hooks you from the beginning with gospel-infused 'Lost' and keeps you engaged with a variety of genres throughout its entirety."

== Track listing ==
All tracks are written by Edgar Nathaniel Sarratt III, Drew Drucker, and Sophie Belle Grajcer (except track 7 written solely by Sarratt), with others noted. All tracks except 7 produced by Drucker and Sophie Gray with others noted.

E3 track listing
No.	Title	Writer(s)	Producers	Length
1.	"Lost"	Aaron Shadrow; Alex Goldblatt; Simon Edward Christensen	Shadrow; Goldblatt; Psymun; Zuko	3:22
2.	"Pretty Girls"	Austin Corona; Wyatt Bernard; Zachary Cassell	Corona; Bernard; Zuko	3:00
3.	"Warning"	Cassell; Elxnce	Zuko; Elxnce	2:52
4.	"Lights Out"	Drew Dvorsky; Steve Cheung; Cassell	Dvorsky; Zuko	2:32
5.	"Heartache Blues"	Shadrow; Dejuan Cross; Isaac Rose; Roark Bailey; Cheung; Bernard; Cassell	Shadrow; Cross; Hunter Madrid; Rose; Bailey; Bernard; Zuko	3:46
6.	"Ball & Chain"	Shadrow; Cross; Bailey; Cheung; Cassell	Shadrow; Cross; Bailey; Zuko	2:54
7.	"Grandpas Interlude"			1:13
8.	"Old Me"	Corona; Dvorsky; Ernest Brown III; Romil Hemnani; Bernard; Cassell	Corona; Charlie Heat; Dvorsky; Hemnani; Bernard; Zuko	3:13
9.	"S.F.B."	Shadrow; Corona; Denzel Curry; Bernard; Cassell	Shadrow; Corona; Bernard; Zuko	2:48
10.	"Like Nah"	Corona; Bernard	Corona; Bernard	2:32
11.	"Hate How Much"	Dvorsky; Jeff Hazin; Jesse Fink	Dvorsky; Hazin; Gray	2:42
12.	"Ready for You"	Shadrow; Cassell	Shadrow; Zuko	3:20
Total length:				34:14

== Personnel ==
=== Musicians ===
- Midwxst – vocals
- Aaron Shadrow – guitar (1), bass guitar (1), drums (1), synthesizer (5, 6, 12)
- Psymun – guitar (1), bass guitar (1)
- Anthony "Jawan" McEastland, Nikki Grier, and Naarai Jacobs – choir (1)
- Sophie Gray – synthesizer (4, 10), additional vocals (5, 6, 9–12)
- Drew Dvorsky – guitar (4–6, 8, 10, 12), bass guitar (5, 8, 11)
- Aaron Leibowitz – flute (5, 8), saxophone (8, 9, 12)
- Kim Vi – piano (5, 12)
- Roark Bailey – synthesizer (6)
- Austin Corona – guitar (8, 10), bass guitar (9, 10)
- Romil Hemnani – piano (8)
- Wyatt Bernard – piano (9), synthesizer (10)
- Denzel Curry – additional vocals (9)
- Ericdoa – additional vocals (9)
- Drew Drucker – guitar (11), additional vocals (11)

=== Technical ===
- Drew Drucker – audio engineer, mixing engineer
- Mike Tucci – mastering engineer
- John Armstrong – additional engineer (1, 2, 4, 5)
