= Tommy Genesis =

Canadian rapper

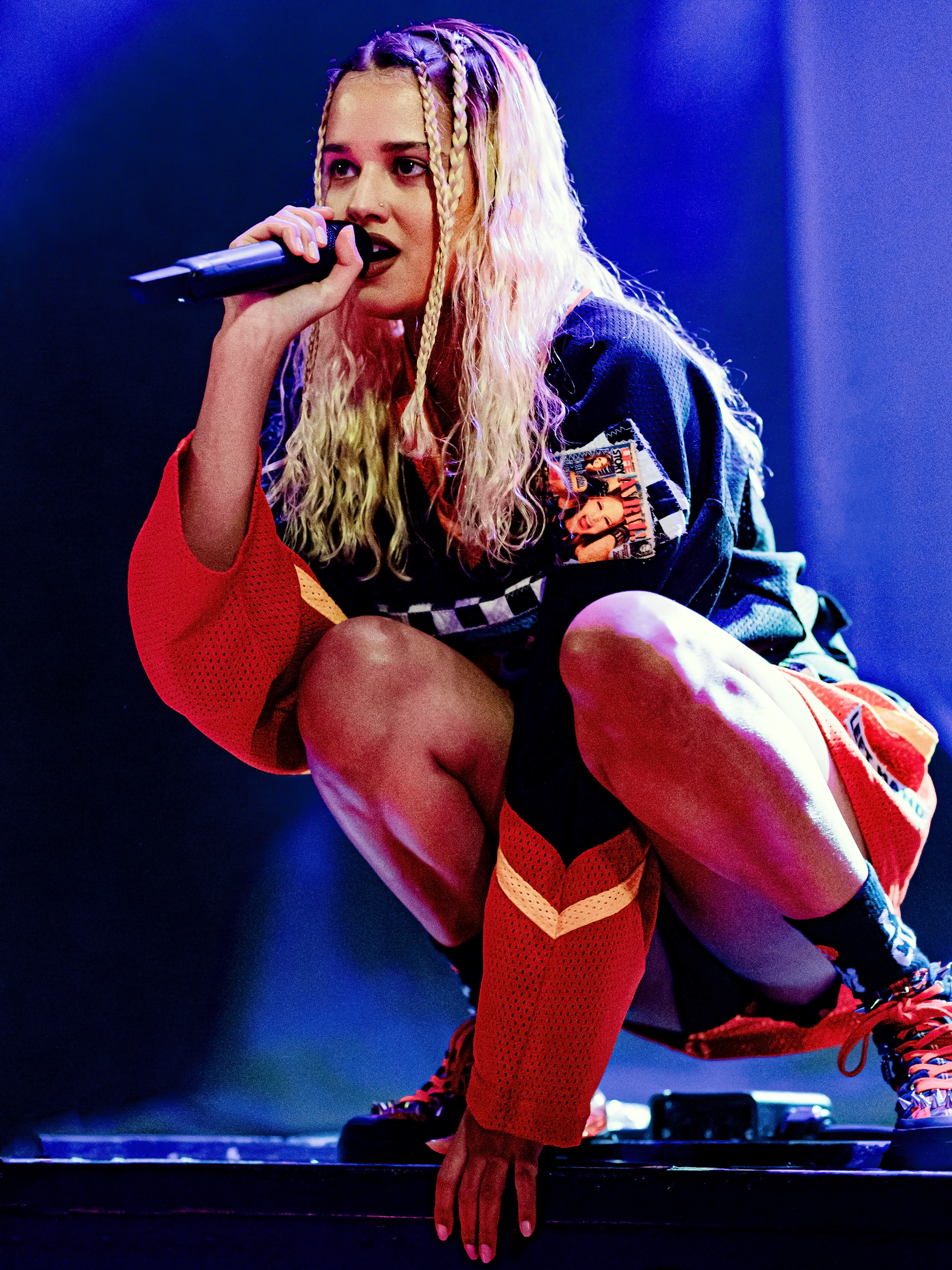
- Genesis in 2023

Background information
- Born: Genesis Yasmine Mohanraj; Vancouver, Canada
- Genres: Alternative hip hop; experimental hip hop; trap
- Occupations: Rapper; singer; model
- Years active: 2013–present
- Labels: Ultra; Downtown; Interscope (current); UMG (former); Awful
- Website: tommygenesis.com

Genesis Yasmine Mohanraj, known by her stage name Tommy Genesis, is a Canadian rapper and model. Her music incorporates experimental style and often sexual verses. Her debut album titled Tommy Genesis was released in November 2018. Her second album Goldilocks X was released in September 2021.

== Early life and education ==
Genesis was born in Vancouver, Canada. She is of Malayali, Tamil and Swedish descent. She graduated from the Emily Carr University of Art and Design where she studied film and sculpture. Genesis is her birth name.

== Career ==
=== Music ===
Genesis started recording rap in 2013 as part of a project called G3NESIS. In 2015 Genesis signed with Awful Records and released her debut mixtape World Vision. In 2017 she signed with Downtown Records/Universal. She collaborated with Abra, another artist from Awful Records, on the track "Hair Like Water Wavy Like the Sea" from Genesis's debut mixtape World Vision.

On July 28, 2018, she released the single "100 Bad". This song is the second collaboration that Tommy made with the music producer Charlie Heat, with whom she previously collaborated on the 2017 song "Tommy". The song is featured on her debut album, Tommy Genesis through Downtown/The Orchard. Later, British singer-songwriter Charli XCX released a remix of "100 Bad" on September 7. Her debut album, Tommy Genesis was released on November 9, 2018.

In 2020, she collaborated with American experimental hip-hop artist JPEGMAFIA on the track "Rough 7" from his EP! extended play.

In 2023, she appeared on Lana Del Rey's ninth studio album Did You Know That There's a Tunnel Under Ocean Blvd on the 15th track, "Peppers", which samples her 2015 song "Angelina".

In July 2025 she released her 5th LP, simply titled Genesis.

=== Fashion ===
Tommy Genesis was recruited by Calvin Klein for their Fall 2016 campaign along with other musical artists. In 2017 she collaborated with rapper M.I.A. at Mercedes-Benz Fashion Week.

== Lyricism ==
Gender and sexuality are common themes in Genesis' music and she has described herself as a "fetish rapper". She is also an advocate against girl-on-girl cyberbullying.

== Personal life ==
Genesis is bisexual.

== Discography ==
=== Studio albums ===
Title	Details
Tommy Genesis	Released: November 9, 2018; Label: Downtown Records, BMG Rights Management; Format: Digital download, streaming, vinyl
Goldilocks X	Released: September 10, 2021; Label: Downtown Records, BMG Rights Management; Format: Digital download, streaming, vinyl
Genesis	Released: July 25, 2025; Label: Ultra Records; Format: Digital download, streaming, vinyl

=== Mixtapes ===
Title	Details
World Vision	Released: July 2, 2015; Label: Awful Records; Format: Digital download, streaming

=== Collaborative Albums ===
Title	Details
World on Fire (with Charlie Heat)	Released: July 29, 2022; Label: Downtown Records, Interscope Records; Format: Digital download, streaming

=== Singles ===
Title	Year	Album
"Art"	2016	Non-album singles
"They Cum They Go"	2016	Non-album singles
"Empty"	2017	Non-album singles
"Tommy"	2017	Tommy Genesis
"Lucky"	2018	non-album single
"100 Bad" (solo or remix featuring Charli XCX)	2018	Tommy Genesis
"Daddy"	2018	Tommy Genesis
"Bad Boy"	2018	Tommy Genesis
"I'm Yours"	2019	Non-album singles
"I'm Gone" (with Jozzy)	2019	Non-album singles
"Cinderelly"	2019	Non-album singles
"Bricks" (with Charli XCX)	2019	Non-album singles
"Peppermint"	2021	Goldilocks X
"A Woman Is a God" (solo or featuring Bia)	2021	Goldilocks X
"Burn the Witch" (with Pvris and Alice Longyu Gao)	2024	F.I.L.T.H.
"Church" (with Austin Millz)	2024	Non-album singles
"Number 1" (with Marlon Hoffstadt)	2024	Non-album singles
"Tempo" (with Kito)	2025	Non-album singles
"T-Shirt" (with Victoria & Miss Bashfull)	2025	Non-album singles
"Slip & Slide" (with Alex Chapman)	2025	Non-album singles
"Baby, Are You Okay?"	2025	Genesis
"True Blue"	2025	Genesis
"Loops"	2025	Genesis
"Girl’s Girl"	2025	Genesis

=== Guest appearances and collaborations ===
List of singles as a lead artist, showing year released
Title	Year	Peak Chart Positions		Album
Title	Year	US Rock	NZ Hot	Album
"Vamp" (Father featuring Tommy Genesis)	2015	—	—	Who's Gonna Get Fucked First?
"Big Boi" (Abra featuring Tommy Genesis)	2016	—	—	Princess
"Enough" (Dakari, G-Eazy and Jozzy featuring Tommy Genesis)	2018	—	—	Non-album single
"2pennies" (Lil West featuring Tommy Genesis)	2019	—	—	Vex Part 1
"Rough 7" (JPEGMafia featuring Tommy Genesis)	2020	—	—	EP!
"Peppers" (Lana Del Rey featuring Tommy Genesis)	2023	26	10	Did You Know That There's a Tunnel Under Ocean Blvd
"Disco" (Nessa Barrett featuring Tommy Genesis)	2024	—	—	Aftercare

== Tours ==
Headlining

- God is Wild Tour (2019)

Supporting

- Dua Lipa – The Self-Titled Tour (2018)
- Charli XCX – Charli Live Tour (2019)
- Poppy - Godless/Goddess Tour (2023; with Pvris)
- Ashnikko - The Weedkiller Tour (2023)
