= Hypochondriac (Brakence album) =

Studio album by Brakence
- Released: December 2, 2022
- Recorded: 2020–2022
- Genres: Pop; hyperpop; Midwest emo; emo rap; emo pop
- Length: 52:12
- Labels: Columbia; Sony
- Producers: Brakence; Wyatt Otis

Brakence chronology
Punk2 (2020)	Hypochondriac (2022)	MarroW (2026)

Singles from Hypochondriac
- 1. "Argyle" Released: October 8, 2021; 2. "CBD" Released: January 21, 2022; 3. "Venus Fly Trap" Released: July 8, 2022; 4. "Caffeine" Released: September 9, 2022; 5. "Bugging!" Released: November 18, 2022

Hypochondriac is the second studio album by American singer-songwriter and rapper Brakence, released on December 2, 2022, through Sony Music and Columbia Records. The release was supported by five singles, a headline tour across America, and a second leg tour with support from Gabby Start. The album has been described as hyperpop, and contains elements of emo rap, emo pop, and Midwest emo. Heavily influenced by the COVID-19 pandemic and the lockdown, the album discusses depersonalisation, health anxiety and disconnection from others online.

Themes of drug use, social media, art in the age of content, relationships, mental health and hookups, are prevalent throughout the album. Hypochondriac was promoted with the Hypochondriac Tour beginning in November 2022. The album's production was handled by Brakence himself and Wyatt Otis. Commercially, Hypochondriac peaked at number thirteen on the Billboard Heatseekers Albums. The album's compact disc (CD) would release in December 2023.

== Background and release ==
Randall Findell a.k.a. Brakence would begin working on his second studio album shortly after the release of his early 2020 debut album Punk2, which incorporated pandemic era themes. Brakence revealed the cover art for Hypochondriac on November 14, 2022, and announced that it would be released on December 2 through Columbia Records. Hypochondriac's lead single "Argyle", released on October 8, 2021. He then followed-up and released a second single, "CBD", on January 21, 2022. On July 8, the third single "Venus Fly Trap" would be released. Later, on September 9, the fourth single "Caffeine" would be released. On November 18, the fifth and final single "Bugging!" would be released, aside the album's track listing. Hypochondriac's theme follows disconnection between the digital world, introversion. Themes of drug use, social media usage, content with making art opposed to serving a greater societal purpose, and relationships, both serious and hookups, are all prevalent within the album. In terms of commentary, the emphasis on social media and the difficulty of maintaining integral social relationships as an artist are clear aftereffects of the quarantine regulations imposed on the United States.

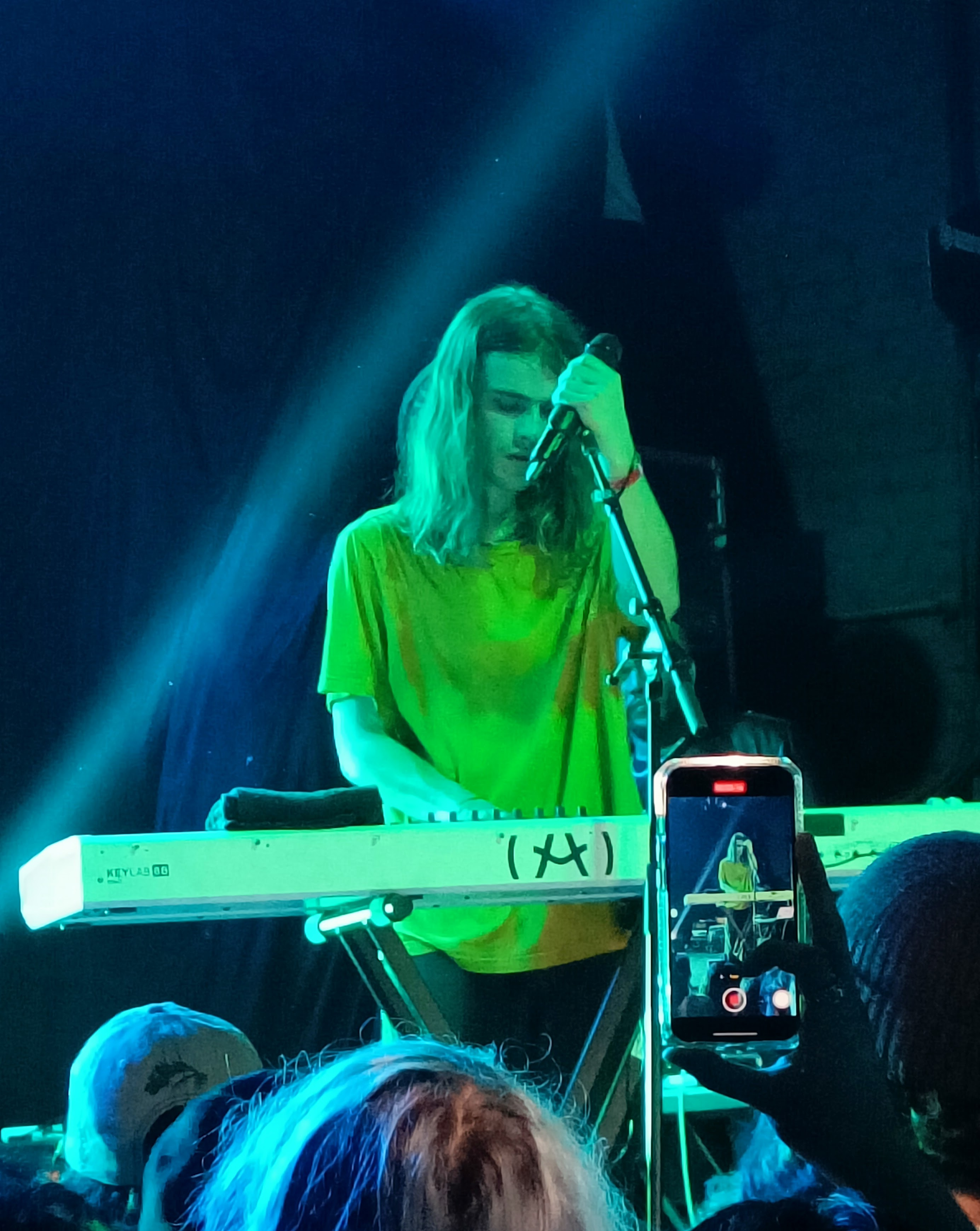
Brakence performing during the Hypochondriac Tour in December 2022.

Brakence embarked on the Hypochondriac Tour to support the album. The tour began on November 26, 2022, in Cleveland, Ohio and concluded on December 20 in Brooklyn, New York; it was his first headlining tour and featured Jane Remover as the opening act. Brakence would eventually embark on a second tour for the album, called the "Hypochondriac (is Still on) Tour," featuring Gabby Start as the opening act. The North American leg of the tour began on October 24, 2023, in Columbus, Ohio and concluded November 22 in San Diego, California.

On December 2, 2023, Brakence announced a restock of all of the album's merchandise, as well as a release of the album on CD. The European leg of the "(is Still on)" tour began on January 14, 2024, in Berlin, Germany and concluded on January 19, 2024, in London, England. Brakence would then announce the second leg of the tour, stating that "for the last three years, [he] had a massive fear of flying," and that "after three years, [he] finally decided to face it."

== Critical reception ==
Professional ratings
Review scores
Source	Rating
Pitchfork	7.3/10

Hypochondriac received generally positive reviews from critics. Reveille's Autumn Siharath would write the about album saying "it plays like a neurotic self-journal filled to the brim with media-induced anxiety. The album explores themes of ego, fame, mental illness, love and death and rebirth with sounds that capture most Millennial and Gen Z emotions with sample sounds of screaming, gunshots and video game narratives." H.D. Angel of Pitchfork said Brakence's [new album] plays like an obsessive process document of internet-mediated anxiety. Angel also felt that the album "warps pop structures with gauzy sound design and hair-trigger songwriting."

== Track listing ==
All tracks written and produced by Randy Findell; additional writers and producers are as indicated.

Hypochondriac track listing
No.	Title	Writer(s)	Producer(s)	Length
1.	"Bugging!"			3:16
2.	"Caffeine"	Randy Findell; Gabriel O'Leary	Findell; O'Leary	3:17
3.	"Venus Fly Trap"			4:55
4.	"Teeth"	Findell; Wyatt Otis	Findell; Otis	4:32
5.	"Intellectual Greed"	Findell; Otis	Findell; Otis	3:29
6.	"5G"			3:29
7.	"Preparation Exercise No. 7 (Trembling)"			3:42
8.	"CBD"			2:39
9.	"Stung"	Findell; Otis	Findell; Otis	5:35
10.	"Argyle"			2:45
11.	"Deepfake"			5:30
12.	"Introvert"	Findell; Danny Rakow		6:14
13.	"Hypochondriac"	Findell; Rakow		2:42
Total length:				52:12

Notes

- All tracks are stylized in lowercase.

== Personnel ==
- Brakence – vocals, production, mixing, recording, engineering
- Joe LaPorta – mastering
- Gabby Start – composer, lyricist (2)
- Maxin – viola (3)
- Vaeda Black – associated performer
- Wyatt Otis – production (4, 5, 9)
- Danny Rakow – composer, lyricist (12, 13)

== Charts ==
Chart (2022)	Peak position
US Heatseekers Albums (Billboard)	13
