= Aries (musician) =

California based music artist

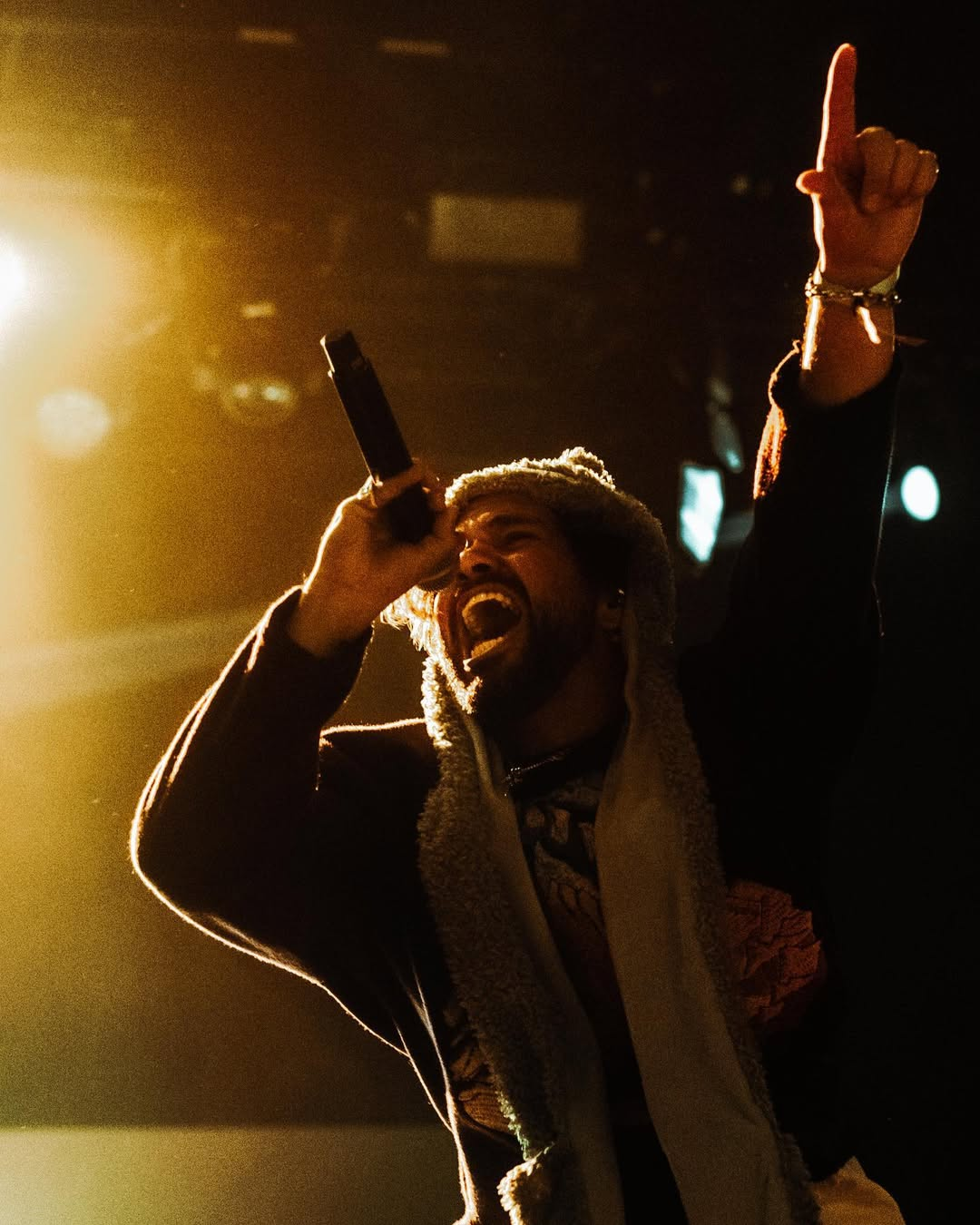
- Aries in 2022

Background information
- Born: April 18, 1998 (age 28); Wichita, Kansas, US
- Origin: Los Angeles, California, US
- Genres: Hip-hop, alternative rock, pop rock, pop
- Years active: 2017-present
- Website: ariesofwunderworld.com

Arshia Fattahi (born April 18, 1998), known professionally as Aries, is an American rapper, singer, and record producer. He is recognized for his genre-blending music that combines hip-hop and alternative influences.

== Early life ==
Aries was born on April 18, 1998 to Iranian parents in Wichita, Kansas before he moved with his family to Orange County, California at the age of 8. Some known family members include Cousins Zaviah Dullahide and Rowan Farrelly. Aries was inspired by his father's career as a professional violinist. At the age of 13, Aries began writing raps and teaching himself music production through YouTube, dedicating extensive time to developing his artistry. Aries has cited Linkin Park as a key artist that influenced his early musical development.

== Career ==
Aries first gained recognition through his YouTube channel, where he built an audience by recreating popular beats and breaking down production techniques. In 2019, Aries released his debut album, WELCOME HOME. The project was very well received and helped establish him as a rising artist in the music industry.

Following the success of WELCOME HOME Aries released his 2021 sophomore album, Believe in Me, Who Believes in You, which charted as the 7th most streamed debut global album of the week on Spotify. The single "ONE PUNCH" from the album was included in NBA 2K22's soundtrack as well as multiple ESPN sports broadcasts.

Aries released the album Glass Jaw on November 14, 2025.

In Early February of 2026, Aries kicked off his global Glass Jaw tour with Tiffany Day.

== Other ventures ==
Aries has also founded the clothing brand WUNDERWORLD and the music festival WUNDERWORLD FEST.

== Discography ==
=== Albums ===
List of studio albums, with selected details and chart positions
Title	Details	Peak chart positions
Title	Details	US
Welcome Home	Released: April 18, 2019; Label: Wunderworld; Format: Vinyl, digital download, streaming	-
Believe in Me, Who Believes in You	Released: November 12, 2021; Label: Wunderworld/Columbia Records; Format: Vinyl, CD, digital download, streaming	90
Glass Jaw	Released: November 14, 2025; Label: Wunderworld; Format: digital download, streaming	-

=== Singles ===
- "Fool's Gold" (2020)
- "Conversations" (2020)
- "Ditto" (2021)
- "Kids on Molly" (2021)
- "One Punch" (2021)
- "Snake Eyes" (2023)
- "Cabin Fever" (2023)
- "In the Flesh" (2025)
- "Sleepwalker" (2025) (with Brakence)
- "Wichita Blues" (2025)
- "Tabloid Talk" (2026) (with Underscores)
