= Summer03 =

EP by Midwxst
- Released: March 26, 2021
- Recorded: 2020–2021
- Genre: Hyperpop
- Length: 13:57
- Label: Simple Stupid; Geffen
- Producer: AyyitsRyo; Delto; Elxnce; Heavn; Lunamatic; Scottryan; Stagehoax; Thislandis

Midwxst chronology
Secrets (2020)	Summer03 (2021)	Back in Action (2021)

Singles from Summer03
- 1. "Trying" Released: November 20, 2020; 2. "Liar" Released: December 31, 2020; 3. "Final Breath" Released: February 18, 2021

Summer03 is the second extended play (EP) by the American singer and rapper Midwxst, released on March 26, 2021, through Simple Stupid and Geffen Records. As his first release with the labels after rising to prominence in the early digicore scene. Production for the EP was handled by a variety of record producers.

Summer03 is an energetic hyperpop EP mixing elements of hip-hop with electronic music. Summer03 was supported by three singles. The album contains guest appearances from Heavn and Glaive. The EP would gain traction online, pushing Midwxst further into the mainstream.

== Background and release ==
Midwxst had emerged as an artist during the digicore scene. The lead single for the extended play (EP) "Trying", would be released a year earlier, on November 20, 2020. Later followed by "Liar" on December 31, 2020, and "Final Breath" on February 18, 2021. A month later, in March 2021, he would release his second extended play (EP) Summer03. "Summer03" was released by Simple Stupid and Geffen Records on March 26, 2021. The production for the EP was handled by a variety of record producers. It contains guest appearances from Heavn and Glaive. Summer03 was supported by three singles "Trying," "Liar," and "Final Breath", the former of which went viral online. In an interview with ViperMag, Midwxst confirmed that the album was punk-inspired.

== Critical reception ==
Sophia Hill writing for New Wave Magazine said the EP was "dense" with energetic trap beats and elements of hyper pop, "while paying homage to artists such as Tyler the Creator, Kanye West, Big Pun, and KRS-One through consistency and innovation."

== Track listing ==
No.	Title	Writer(s)	Producer(s)	Length
1.	"Liar"	Edgar Sarratt; Ethan Williams	Stagehoax; Scottryan	2:17
2.	"Trying"	Sarratt; Logan Cartwright; Ryland J. Kelly	Elxnce; Thislandis	2:01
3.	"Vivid"	Sarratt; Cartwright; Avery Rivera	Elxnce; AyyitsRyo	1:49
4.	"Jack Of All Trades"	Sarratt; Cartwright; Xavier Deltomme	Delto; Elxnce	1:16
5.	"Smile" (featuring Glaive)	Sarratt; Cartwright; J. Kelly; Ash Gutierrez	Elxnce; Thislandis	2:27
6.	"Devour" (featuring Heavn)	Sarratt; LaRee Greggs	Heavn	2:06
7.	"Final Breath"	Sarratt; Eric Wood; Deltomme	Delto; Lunamatic	2:05
Total length:				13:57

== Personnel ==
Credits adapted from Tidal.

- Midwxst – vocals, recording, songwriting
- Glaive – vocals
- Xavier Deltomme – songwriting (tracks 4, 7)
- Avery Carlos-Maquise Rivera – songwriting (track 3)
- Logan Cartwright – songwriting (tracks 2–5)
- Ethan Williams – songwriting (track 7)
- Ryland J. Kelly/Thislandis – songwriting (tracks 2, 5)
- LaRee Greggs – songwriting (track 6)
- Stagehoax – production (track 1)
- Scottryan – production (track 1)
- AyyitsRyo – production (track 3)
- Heavn – production (track 6)
- Lunamatic – production (track 7)
- Elxnce – production (tracks 2, 3, 5)
- Delto – production (tracks 4, 7)

== Release history ==
Region	Date	Format(s)	Label	Edition	Ref.
Worldwide	March 26, 2021	Streaming; digital download	Self-released	Original	
Worldwide	August 20, 2021	Streaming; digital download	Simple Stupid; Geffen	Re-release	
