= Tommy Genesis (album) =

2018 album by Tommy Genesis

Studio album by Tommy Genesis
- Released: November 9, 2018
- Recorded: 2017–2018
- Length: 31:10
- Label: Downtown
- Producer: Bijan Amir; Charlie Heat; JJared; IV the Polymath; Jeff Gitelman; Darnell Got It; Dez Wright; Nok; Mike McHenry; Jean Baptiste; Jozzy; Matty Busco; Yas

Tommy Genesis chronology
World Vision (2015)	Tommy Genesis (2018)	Goldilocks X (2021)

Singles from Tommy Genesis
- 1. "Tommy" Released: 22 September 2017; 2. "100 Bad (Charli XCX Remix)" Released: 7 September 2018; 3. "Daddy" Released: 28 September 2018; 4. "Bad Boy" Released: 6 November 2018

Tommy Genesis is the debut studio album by Canadian rapper Tommy Genesis. It was released on November 9, 2018, by Downtown Records.

== Background ==
The album's release was preceded by the single "Tommy" in September 2017. Genesis describes the album as a "weird mesh of rapping and singing".

== Reception ==
Prior to the album release, Genesis was featured in TheGuardian.com as "One to watch". Pitchfork rated the album 7.3. Highsnobiety rated the album 4.5 out of 5 stars.

== Track listing ==
Credits adapted from Tidal.

No.	Title	Writer(s)	Producer(s)	Length
1.	"God Sent"	Genesis Mohanraj; Bijan Amir	Amir	0:54
2.	"Rainbow"	Mohanraj; Ernest Brown	Charlie Heat; JJared	2:47
3.	"Bad Boy"	Mohanraj; Amir	Amir; IV the Polymath; Jeff Gitelman	2:02
4.	"100 Bad" (Charli XCX remix)	Mohanraj; Brown; Charlotte Aitchison	Charlie Heat	2:58
5.	"Daddy"	Mohanraj; Jozzy	Jozzy; Charlie Heat	2:44
6.	"Play with It"	Mohanraj; Brown	Charlie Heat; Darnell Got It	2:00
7.	"You Know Me"	Mohanraj; Brown	Charlie Heat; Dez Wright	3:07
8.	"Naughty" (featuring Empress Of)	Mohanraj; Lorely Rodriguez	Gitelman; Nok	2:30
9.	"Drive"	Mohanraj	Gitelman	3:34
10.	"It's Ok"	Mohanraj	Darnell Got It; Jean Baptiste; Mike McHenry	3:31
11.	"Tommy"	Mohanraj; Brown	Charlie Heat	2:42
12.	"Miami"	Mohanraj; Brown; Jozzy	Charlie Heat; Matty Busco; Yas	2:31
Total length:				31:10
