= Sebii =

- Born: Sebastian Yang DeMarino; April 30, 1999 (age 27); Shanghai, China
- Genres: Hip hop; hyperpop; glitchcore
- Occupations: Rapper; singer; songwriter; record producer
- Instruments: Vocals, guitar
- Years active: 2019–present

Sebastian Yang DeMarino (born April 30, 1999) known professionally as Sebii (pronounced Seb-ee; stylized as SEBii), is a Chinese-born American singer-songwriter and producer commonly known for his tracks “Butterfly Bankai”, "Play Poker Remix" the latter of which, with producer Maple.

== Life and career ==
Sebii, born Sebastian Yang DeMarino, was born on April 30, 1999, in Shanghai, China. SEBii later moved to New York, where he became fascinated with the culture and eventually enrolled at the Rhode Island School of Design. SEBii collaborated with BAYLI on a remix of "boys lie". The music video for "Play Poker Remix" was filmed by his grandmother. The song went viral, alongside "Butterfly Bankai." SEBii and Y2Kyle are the Creative Directors of the diverse "VVSS2" visuals. Sebii was featured on Tohji's April–May 2024 S/S TOUR globe tour, which included international artists such as Fruit Woman GOGO, Alice Longyu Gao, FiFi Zhang, and SEBii.

== Discography ==
Studio albums

- Visored Vitality (2019)
- VVV (2020)
- VVSS (2020)
- VVSS2 (2024)
- 潮 (2025)

Singles

- Butterfly Bankai (2019)
- Play Poker (2020)
- talk down (2020)
- boys lie (Remix)
