= Midnight (Whethan album) =

Studio album by Whethan
- Released: April 29, 2022
- Genre: EDM; dance-pop; electro-pop; glitch; hip-hop
- Length: 27:07
- Label: Atlantic
- Producer: 704tex; AHmac; Aldn; Chrome Sparks; Glasear; Grady; Jeff Hazin; Kimj; Tim Randolph; Tobias Wincorn; Underscores; Whethan

Whethan chronology
Fantasy (2020)	Midnight (2022)	Life of a Wallflower, Vol. 2 (2024)

Midnight is the second studio album by American DJ and electronic music producer Whethan. The album was released on April 29, 2022, through Atlantic Records. It features vocals from artists such as Yeat, Midwxst, Matt Ox, Slump6s, Ericdoa, and Glaive. Production was handled by Whethan, Tobias Wincorn, and Aldn, among others.

== Background ==
In an interview with Las Vegas Weekly, Whethan stated, “I’m very quick to want to try something new and always trying to find that new next sound,” further explaining, “A lot of music I was listening to on SoundCloud was really speaking to me, and I was lucky enough to get to work with a lot of the kids that I was listening to—[like] Glaive, Ericdoa, Midwxst—just as a pure fan. And then luckily enough, [they] got in the studio and I found that our sounds were just mixing and crossing over so well that the Midnight project kind of just happened on its own."

== Personnel ==
Credits adapted from Tidal.

- Yeat – featured artist
- Midwxst – featured artist
- Matt Ox – featured artist
- Whethan – vocals
