= Tana (rapper) =

American rapper (born 2006)

- Also known as: BabySantana; BANA
- Born: Steven Lewis; November 14, 2006 (age 20); Columbus, Georgia, U.S.
- Genres: Hip hop; SoundCloud rap; rage
- Occupations: Singer; rapper; songwriter; record producer
- Instrument: Vocals
- Years active: 2020–present
- Labels: Galactic; Republic (former)
- Website: popstar-life.com

Steven Dale Lewis II (born November 14, 2006), known professionally as Tana or Bana (stylized in all lowercase; formerly known as BabySantana) is an American rapper, singer, songwriter, and record producer. He rose to popularity in early 2021 with the singles "14" and "Antisocial", which both gained traction on TikTok and SoundCloud.

== Early life ==
Tana grew up being heavily inspired by the Chicago trap scene, which at the time was led by Chief Keef and Fredo Santana, the latter of whom also inspired his former rap alias BabySantana, alongside BabyTron.

== Career ==
=== 2020–2021: Beginnings and breakthrough ===
Tana started his music career in 2020, sharing music through platforms such as YouTube and SoundCloud in May of that year. Shortly after, Tana began to learn how to produce music. He later formed a small collective with his friends titled 1500 —which at first only included Slump6s, although additional artists and producers were recruited throughout the following years. Tana came to fame in 2020 following the success of his single "Prada" after it went viral on social media platforms, leading to a remix with Galactic Records label associate Lil Tecca. Tana is associated with artists including Kashdami, Midwxst, and Yvngxchris. He is currently signed to Galactic Records, a subsidiary of Republic Records, but continues to release music independently through multiple SoundCloud accounts. Tana and fellow rapper Kashdami released the collaborative single "14" on July 20, 2021, which was featured on the Lyrical Lemonade YouTube channel.

=== 2022–present: Gaultier and Me ===
In 2022, Tana announced his debut studio album, Gaultier, which was initially set for a late 2022 release. On August 15, 2022, Tana released the first promotional single "Swaggin Like This" with Lancey Foux, followed by the single "Hell Yeah" four days later. In an Atlanta show in 2025, Tana was seen on stage with fellow rapper, Playboi Carti. On June 19, 2026, after two years of releasing a project, Tana released his fourth studio album Me, under Create Music Group, following his departure from Galactic and Republic Records. The project serves as the first of an upcoming trilogy by the rapper.

== Critical reception ==
In their 2025 "best rappers under 20" ranking, Complex ranked Tana at number eight, where Dimas Sanfiorenzo called him the "most diverse rapper on the list". On their 2026 ranking, Tana moved up to the seventh spot on the ranking, where Sanfiorenzo praised his commercial appeal to the fans, where he labeled Tana as an "underground darling".

== In other media ==
Although unreleased, "RckstrLivin" a song between Quavo, HXG, and Tana was featured in the Grand Theft Auto VI VCRR soundtrack. Tana achieved this feature independently with the help of his manager Chris Skylark who brought the track to Rockstar Games.

== Discography ==
=== Studio albums ===
- Gaultier (2023)
- Bana (2024)
- Me (2026)

=== Mixtapes ===
- Planet Sosa (2020)
- DakotaRomani (with Slump6s) (2021)
- London (2023)

=== EPs ===
- Recreation (2020)
- Nyctophilia (2020)
- Dale (2023)

=== Singles ===
- "Red Eye!" (2020)
- "Felony" (2020)
- "Prada" (2020)
- "2020" (2020)
- "Blitz" (2020)
- "14" with Kashdami (2021)
- "No Hook" featuring Yvngxchris (2021)
- "Antisocial" with Slump6s and Maajins (2021)
- "Antisocial 2" featuring Slump6s, Yung Fazo, SSGKobe and Xhulooo (2021)
- "Patricia" (2021)
- "Off the Leash!" featuring Yvngxchris and Luisss (2022)
- "NYC" (2022)
- "Kite" (2022)
- "Swaggin Like This" featuring Lancey Foux (2022)
- "Hell Yeah" (2022)
- "Red" (2022)
- "Fear No Man" (2022)
- "Knoya" (2023)
- "Blow Dis Strain" (2023)
- "Feds Lurkin'" (2023)
- "Prolly" (2023)
- "Nawl" (2023)
- "HTX" (2023)
- "Decatur" (2024)
- "Jesus Piece" (2024)
- "Living Lavish" (2024)
- "New Cash" (2025)
- "Magic City" (2025)
- "Latto" (2026)
- "OMG 2" (2026)
- "KimK" (2026)

== Awards ==
Region	Certification	Certified units/sales	Ref.
United States (RIAA)	Gold	500,000	
