= Social media and psychology =

Social media began in the form of generalized online communities. These online communities formed on websites like Geocities.com in 1994, Theglobe.com in 1995, and Tripod.com in 1995. Many of these early communities focused on social interaction by bringing people together through the use of chat rooms. The chat rooms encouraged users to share personal information, ideas, or even personal web pages. Later the social networking community Classmates took a different approach by simply having people link to each other by using their personal email addresses. By the late 1990s, social networking websites began to develop more advanced features to help users find and manage friends. These newer generation of social networking websites began to flourish with the emergence of SixDegrees.com in 1997, Makeoutclub in 2000, Hub Culture in 2002, and Friendster in 2002. However, the first profitable mass social networking website was the South Korean service, Cyworld. Cyworld initially launched as a blog-based website in 1999 and social networking features were added to the website in 2001. Other social networking websites emerged like Myspace in 2002, LinkedIn in 2003, and Bebo in 2005. In 2009, the social networking website Facebook (launched in 2004) became the largest social networking website in the world. Both Instagram and Kik were launched in October 2010. Active users of Facebook increased from just a million in 2004 to over 750 million by the year 2011. Making internet-based social networking both a cultural and financial phenomenon. In September 2011, Snapchat was launched and reported over 300 million users in 2021.

== Psychology of social networking ==
A social network is a social structure made up of individuals or organizations who communicate and interact with each other. Social networking sites – such as Facebook, Twitter, Instagram, Pinterest and LinkedIn – are defined as technology-enabled tools that assist users with creating and maintaining their relationships. A study found that middle schoolers reported using social media to see what their friends are doing, to post pictures, and to connect with friends. Human behavior related to social networking is influenced by major individual differences, meaning that people differ quite systematically in the quantity and quality of their social relationships. Two of the main personality traits that are responsible for this variability are the traits of extraversion and introversion. Extraversion refers to the tendency to be socially dominant, exert leadership, and influence on others. In contrast, introversion reflects a tendency towards shyness, social phobia, or even avoid social situations altogether, which could potentially reduce the number of social contacts a person may have. These individual differences may result in different social networking outcomes. Other psychology factors related to social media and Media psychology are depression, anxiety, attachment, self-identity, well-being, and the need to belong.

=== Neuroscience ===
The three domains that neural systems rely on to be strengthened to support social media use are social cognition, self-referential cognition, and social rewarding.

When someone posts something on social media, they think of how their audience will react, while the audience thinks of the motivations behind posting the information. Both parties are analyzing the other's thoughts and feelings, which coherently rely on multiple network systems of the brain including the dorsomedial prefrontal cortex, bilateral temporoparietal junction, anterior temporal lobes, inferior frontal gyri, and posterior cingulate cortex. All of these systems work to help us process social behaviors and thoughts drawn out on social media.

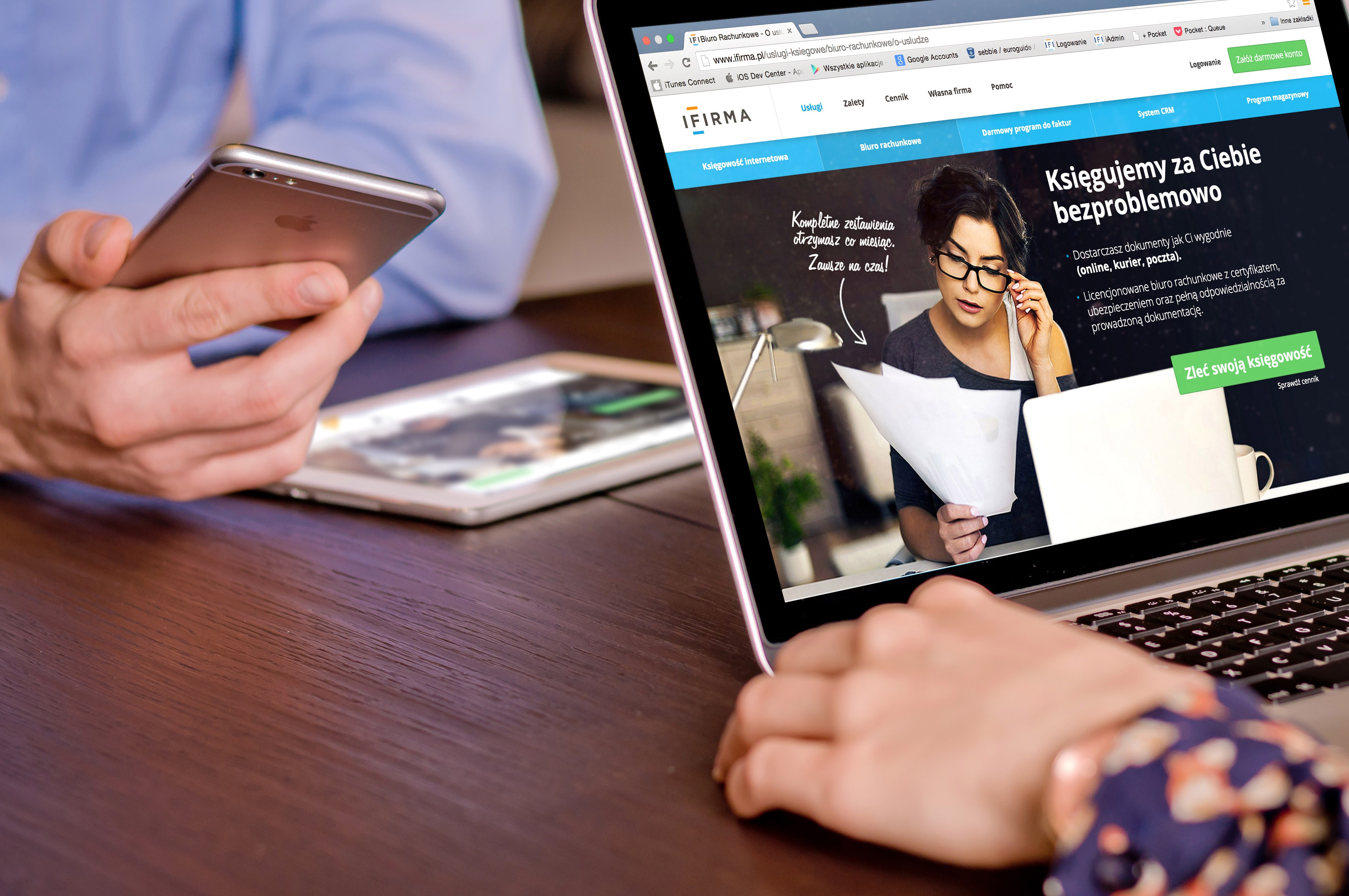
Social media causes people to multitask and spend more time online

Social media requires a great deal of self-referential thought. People use social media as a platform to express their opinions and show off their past and present selves. In other words, as Bailey Parnell said in her Ted Talk, we're showing off our "highlight reel" (4). When one receives feedback from others, the individual obtains more reflected self-appraisal which leads to comparisons of their social behaviors or "highlights" to other users. Self-referential thought involves activity in the medial prefrontal cortex and the posterior cingulate cortex. The brain uses these systems when thinking of oneself.

A 2021 umbrella review found that most associations between adolescent social media use and mental health were characterized as weak or inconsistent, though certain studies identified 'substantial' negative impacts, particularly linked to passive consumption and problematic use.

Social media also provides a constant supply of rewards that keeps users coming back for more. Whenever users receive a like or a new follower, it activates the brain's social reward system which includes the ventromedial prefrontal cortex, ventral striatum, and ventral tegmental area. This system has been found to activate in response to positive feedback from peers, suggesting that users experience online acceptance in a similar manner to other material rewards or positive experiences, further acting as a potential reward.

While these areas of the brain become strengthened, other parts of the brain start to weaken. Technology is encouraging multi-tasking, especially because of how easy it is to switch from one task to another by opening another tab or using two devices at once. The brain's hippocampus is mainly associated with long-term memory. In a study done by Russell Poldark, a professor at UCLA, they found that "for the task learned without distraction, the hippocampus was involved. However, for the task learned with the distraction of the beeps, the hippocampus was not involved; but the striatum was, which is the brain system that underlies our ability to learn new skills." The study concludes that multitasking can cause reliance on the striatum more than the hippocampus, which can change the way we learn. The striatum is known to be connected to mainly the brain's reward system. The brain will strengthen the neurons to the striatum while it weakens the neurons to the hippocampus to make the brain more efficient. Because our brain starts to rely on the striatum more than the hippocampus, it becomes harder for us to process new information. Nicholas Carr, author of The Shallows: How The Internet Is Changing Our Brains, agrees: "What psychologists and brain scientists tell us about interruptions is that they have a fairly profound effect on the way we think. It becomes much harder to sustain attention, to think about one thing for a long period of time, and to think deeply when new stimuli are pouring at you all day long. I argue that the price we pay for being constantly inundated with information is a loss of our ability to be contemplative and to engage in the kind of deep thinking that requires you to concentrate on one thing."

Research has also examined whether smartphones can affect cognition even when they are not actively being used. Ward et al. (2017) reported that just the presence of a person's smartphone reduced available cognitive capacity in two experiments, although a 2022 preregistered replication did not reproduce this effect, suggesting that the relationship between smartphone presence and cognitive performance remains inconclusive.

=== Well-Being ===
How does well-being relate to social media? In an article titled Social Impact of Psychological Research on Well-Being Shared in Social Media, Pulido et al. found a 15.7% social impact in their results. These new results were compared to a previous study conducted by Pulido et al., which had a high of 4.98% compared to 27.5% in the new study. These results show the ESISM, which is evidence of social impact present. In a two-year span, the difference between social impact rose 22.52% according to these studies. When taking into consideration that an increasingly large number of teens report either being active on, or having used, some form of social media, ranging from apps such as Facebook to TikTok, researching the effects of social media on the well-being of teens and young adults has become more of a topic of focus in recent years.

=== Depression ===
Especially in today's society, social media has gained a new perspective on younger generations. It is what younger generations are born into and are growing up to use, particularly what is running today's society. Social Media has its downfalls regarding depression and mental health. Many users often compare their lives regarding what they see on these platforms. In an article Does Social Media Cause Depression? by the Child Mind Institute, Miller states that "several studies, teenage and young adult users who spend the most time on Instagram, Facebook and other platforms for have shown to have substantially (from 13 to 66 percent) higher rates of reported depression than those who spent the least time", what the study shows how Facebook and Instagram, platforms showcasing daily lives and or lifestyles, or less fulfilling or less satisfied or more flaunting base or superficial. Instead of social community, there has become a perception of individuals striving for a life that is not real, whether that is editing photos or making life seem perfect when it is not. This causes a sense of depression by the weight of a comparing game. In "How Social Media Affects Your Teen's Mental Health: A Parent's Guide," Kathy Katella states, "According to a research study of American teens ages 12-15, those who used social media over three hours each day faced twice the risk of having negative mental health outcomes, including depression and anxiety symptoms." Teenagers are facing more and more complications everyday because of the overuse of social media.

Teenagers and young adults see these ideal lifestyles and make these assumptions about their personal lives, questioning their values and sense of belonging, bringing forth this aspect of depression. For example, on Facebook and Instagram, these platforms allow comments on posts or stories, indicating hateful and nasty comments/bullying that can cause mental health issues. Research shows that social media or internet exposure is linked to negative thoughts and behaviors. Having increased self-injury with usage of social media due to the comment sections and the community that is allowed to make negative remarks towards not only the creator but others in the comment section as well. With content analysis showing that 82% of posts on Tumblr are related to self-harm, depression or suicide. Other studies show that 83% of adolescents have viewed content that include self-harm or suicide which include videos or images that encourage related behavior. This type of content is able to be viewed due to the lack of online safety. But by understanding how these platforms function and affect specific age groups, the risk assessments and early interventions can be greatly improved in the future.

As the internet first began to grow in popularity, researchers noted an association between increases in internet usage and decreases in offline social involvement and psychological well-being. Investigators explained these findings through the hypothesis that the internet supports poor quality relationships. In light of the recent emergence of online social networking, there has been growing concern of a possible relationship between individuals' activities on these forums and symptoms of psychopathology, particularly depression.

Research has shown a positive correlation between time spent on social networking sites and depressive symptoms. One possible explanation for this relationship is that people use social networking sites as a method of social comparison, which leads to social comparison bias. Adolescents who used Facebook and Instagram to compare themselves with and seek reassurance from other users experienced more depressive symptoms. It is likely, though, that the effects of social comparison on social networking sites is influenced by who people are interacting with on those sites. Specifically, Instagram users who followed a higher percentage of strangers were more likely to show an association between Instagram use and depressive symptoms than were users who followed a lower percentage of strangers.

Other studies have found that social media use can potentially increase symptoms of depression in adolescents. Kleppgang et al. (2021) found that adolescents who used social media or played video games for more than three hours a day experienced a higher proportion of symptoms of depression. The goal of Kleppang's study was to examine the relationship between electronic media use and symptoms of depression and to observe whether gender or platonic relationships affect said relationship. They used surveys and web-based questionnaires to gather data. The subjects, sourced from all over Norway, were adolescents in tenth grade. The questions that were presented to the participants asked them to identify any symptoms of depression they have experienced, the frequency of which they used social media, and their gender.

Research support for a relationship between online social networking and depression remains mixed. For example, some studies have found that people experiencing feelings of inferiority may share these spontaneously on social media rather than seeking face-to-face help with medical professionals. Similarly, Banjanin and colleagues (2015), for example, found a relationship between increased internet use and depressive symptoms, but no relationship between time spent on social networking sites and depressive symptoms. Several other studies have similarly found no relationship between online social networking and depression. In fact, studies that show there is no particular relationships between using Social media and the mental health suggest that there should be all the time support for young ages to prevent any mental health damage. Even though the direction of any relationship between depression and using social media platform is still unclear. Current research for this issue had been applying on ages between 13 and 18 and it was for the outcome depression, anxiety or psychological distress, assessed by validated instruments. Betul and colleagues,

=== Suicide ===
As found in a journal article from the American Academy of Pediatrics cyberbullying can lead to "profound psychosocial outcomes including depression, anxiety, severe isolation, and, tragically, suicide." This introduces relationship between social networking and suicide. Cyberbullying on social media has a strong correlation to causes of suicide among adolescents and young adults. Results of a study by Hinduja and Patchin examining a large sample of middle school-aged adolescents found that those who experienced cyberbullying were twice as likely to attempt or be successful in committing suicide. In a study done by The 2019 School Crime Supplement to the National Crime Victimization Survey (National Center for Education Statistics and Bureau of Justice) indicates that, nationwide, about 16 percent of students in grades 9–12 experienced cyberbullying by time they reach high school or are in high school. Additionally, "social media sites that allow greater anonymity (e.g., Yik Yak, Whisper) have higher rates of cyberbullying perpetration than sites on which users are more identifiable." Many people can easily bully and harass others when their name is not mentioned in the statement. It prevents them from getting the real-world consequences, in which they feel less responsible for their actions.

=== Attachment ===
In psychology, attachment theory is a model that attempts to describe the interpersonal relationships people have throughout their lives. The most commonly recognized four styles of attachment in adults are: secure, anxious-preoccupied, dismissive-avoidant, and fearful-avoidant. With the rapid increase in social networking sites, scientists have become interested in the phenomenon of people relying on these sites for their attachment needs. Attachment style has been significantly related to the level of social media use and social orientation on Facebook. Additionally, attachment anxiety has been found to be predictive of less feedback seeking and Facebook usage, whereas attachment avoidance was found to be predictive less feedback seeking and usage. The study found that anxiously attached individuals more frequently comment, "like," and post. Furthermore, the authors suggest that anxious people behave more actively on social media sites because they are motivated to seek positive feedback from others. Despite their attempts to fulfill their needs, data suggests that individuals who use social media to fulfill these voids are typically disappointed and further isolate themselves by reducing their face-to-face interaction time with others. Studies also show that 17% of people claim that they have been ignored in conversations face-to-face due to the usage of social media. The term “doom scrolling” is a common phrase that is used to normalize the high usage of social media and the disconnect from physical interaction. A study done in 2025 by International Journal of Social and Human Studies showed that doomscrolling causes increased depression, stress and anxiety, specifically in young adults. These feelings cause riffs in personal relationships and increase disconnection between people. In a study that was done in 2021 says “that the time a person spends on Instagram is associated with dissatisfaction in their relationship.” Which is another effect from scrolling social media for long periods of time. This habit causes conflicts in personal relationships. As said in The Attachment Project “low relationship satisfaction is associated with conflict engagement, defensiveness, and withdrawal.”

=== Self-identity ===
One's self-identity, also commonly known as self-concept, can be defined as a collection of beliefs an individual has about his or herself. It can also be defined as an individual's answer to "Who am I?". Social media offers a means of exploring and forming self-identity, especially for adolescents and young adults. Early adolescence has been found to be the period in which most online identity experimentation occurs, compared to other periods of development. Researchers have identified some of the most common ways early adolescents explore identity are through self-exploration (e.g. to investigate how others react), social compensation (e.g. to overcome shyness), and social facilitation (e.g. to facilitate relationship formation). Additionally, early adolescents use the Internet more to talk to strangers and form new relationships, whereas older adolescents tend to socialize with current friends." Individuals have a high need for social affiliation but find it hard to form social connections in the offline world, and social media may afford a sense of connection that satisfies their needs for belonging, social feedback, and social validation." Of the various concepts comprising self-identity, self-esteem, and self-image, specifically body image, have been given much attention in regard to its relationship with social media usage. Despite the popularity of social media, the direct relationship between Internet exposure and body image has been examined in only a few studies. Individuals are known for having a tendency to compare themselves to others for their own self-evaluation, most prominently through adolescence. Social media makes it even easier for adolescents to engage in these behaviors of social comparison, allowing them to view others all over the world at any given moment. In one study looking at over 150 high school students, survey data regarding online social networking use and body image was collected. With students reporting an average of two to three hours per day online, online social media usage has been significantly related to an internalization of thin ideals, appearance comparison, weight dissatisfaction, and drive for thinness. In a more recent study that focused more specifically on Facebook usage in over 1,000 high school girls, the same association between the amount of use and body dissatisfaction was found, with Facebook users reporting significantly higher levels of body dissatisfaction than non-users. Current research findings suggest a negative relationship between self-image and social media usage for adolescents. In other words, the more an adolescent uses social media, the more likely he or she is to feel bad about themselves, more specifically regarding how they look.

Types of social media engagement may differently affect self-esteem in youth. There are unsaid social understanding on social media that make people come as 'uncool' or 'desperate', as a study research points out that liking, commenting on others' s posts is predicted to reduce the appearance of self-esteem. About 40% of teens surveyed revealed that they may not post on social media in fear of people ridiculing them for what they post. Social media use decrease future appearance confidence in young women especially. This has increased the negative effects of the beauty standard that many women and young girls struggle to live up too with social media causing it to become worse for them. This has led them to be more negatively affected by social media and to lash out using the device. According to the study done in Italy with students that were 11, 13, and 15 years old, "Girls reported higher cyber-victimization and problematic social media usage than boys (9.1% vs 6.0% and 10.2% vs 6.1%, respectively)." On top of that, a survey conducted by the Pew Research Center found that there is more TikTok usage in Black teens (81%) and teen girls (73%) than white teen boys (62%). The app TikTok creates the affect that social comparison or the "fear of missing out are related to negative affect and might have detrimental effects on the usage experience and/or TikTok users' lives in general." Apps like TikTok can make an addictive social media environment that can have negative correlations to self-esteem.

=== Narcissism and social media use ===
Narcissistic personality disorder has been connected with an inflated sense of self-worth and a need for excessive attention. Like many disorders there are varying versions of narcissism. (1) Grandiose; typically arrogant, a higher sense of entitlement and a belief that they are better than everyone and everyone knows it. (2) malignant; similar to grandiose but as one tries to lift themselves up they have no concern with destroying others in the process. (3) covert; arrogance mixed with highly self-absorbed tendencies. Inability to accept responsibility and a chronic victim of the world and finally (4) communal; self-absorbed and needs acknowledgement for good they do while typically the good they do is all for show and not genuine.

There is a direct connection between narcissistic personality disorder and social media. Studies are showing a connection between narcissism and motives for social media, such as seeking admiration for content and increase following. It has been implicated that narcissists find their content to be of higher quality and therefore share more information on their social media platforms due to a feeling of superiority.

There have been many studies to date, all typically using predictive analysis and surveys that require participates to self-report social media usage. It should be mentioned as this self-reporting directly impacts the results and relies on participates to answer truthfully.

In 2016, McCain and Campbell found that narcissism was related to greater number of posts, more time spent on social media platforms and having more friends/followers on their platforms. In 2017 Andreassen, Pallesen, and Griffiths found that narcissism may be associated with addictive use of social media.

Most of the studies are finding positive relationships between grandiose forms of narcissism and self-reported SM activities. However, in general, there is still variance in the results and continued studies investigating how narcissism relates to use of social media is needed.

=== Attention Span and Social Media ===
Social media also has psychological effects on our attention span due to the structure of platforms and the dopamine that is released from using them. Our brains have been trained for constant stimulation, connection, validation, and more. Apps like TikTok, Instagram, and YouTube Shorts show us videos that are fast and entertaining which releases dopamine and makes it harder to focus on longer or slower content. Things like notification alerts and tones also distract people, and a study has found that it takes approximately 23 minutes to refocus after the interruption. The more notifications received, the more distractions that occur, and then our brains are rewired to crave this distraction. People's focus and attention spans continue to decrease as the desire for social media use and distractions increases.

In a study done by the Pakistan Journal of Humanities and Social Sciences (PJHSS), it was concluded that there was a significant relationship between social media addiction and mind wandering, indicating that social media addiction leads to mind wandering. It also found that high social media use leads to higher levels of phubbing behavior, or the act of ignoring others in public. The findings in this article go to show the correlation between social media usage and a lack of attention span, by mind wandering, and a lack of engagement and attention in social settings.

=== Child psychology and social media. ===
To clarify the impact even more, it is crucial to acknowledge the complex correlation between mental health issues and social media use. Primack et al. (2017) found that there is a correlation between heavy social media use and an increase in depressive symptoms in children, based on their longitudinal research. This emphasizes the need to understand the complex dynamics at work as well as the possible negative effects. The complex web of influences on mental health is influenced by several factors, including the type of content consumed, how long it is used for, and the caliber of online interactions. Understanding these intricacies emphasizes the necessity of an all-encompassing approach to awareness and research.

The multibillion-dollar advertising industry targeting youth, particularly through digital channels, raises concerns. Research links advertising exposure to unhealthy behaviors in children. These behaviors include consumption of low-nutrient foods, tobacco, alcohol, and indoor tanning. Children's vulnerability arises from immature critical thinking. The policy urges pediatricians to promote digital literacy, emphasizing the need for policymakers and tech companies to adopt practices fostering healthier outcomes in the digital environment and expressing concern about tracking children's digital behavior for targeted marketing.

In conclusion, the impact of social media on child psychology is a multifaceted and evolving field of study. As technology continues to advance, research and awareness must adapt to encompass the complexities of digital interactions.

=== Parenting in the Age of Social Media ===
The accessibility and vastness of social media can make it difficult for parents to manage their children's behavior and safety, which is why researchers recommend parents establish healthy habits in regards to social media usage to protect them. So though young children are affected by social media, so are adults. As said in CSUSB ScholarWorks “Studies have shown that frequent eye contact, one on one time, and undivided attention are necessary in building a secure attachment between a parent and child”. But due to the excessive amount of social media use, these bonding activities are decreasing and hindering children’s development in their important early years, causing distracted parenting. Other studies show that children who claim that they had experienced a better overall relationship with their parents say that they were was less social media use involved. It is also important to note that parents who rely on using social media targeted towards their children, also has effects. “Prolonged screen time with reduced parent-child interaction also places children at risk of having delays in their conversational and social interaction skills.” Having a healthy balance for both the parent and child on social media is possible and can be done by encouraging self-regulation to children along with setting boundaries for screen time. Also, by creating an environment of open communication with children regarding social media and enforcing a safe space for the child to speak on their personal experiences on social media freely. “This will encourage children to seek their parents’ advice and help when they face difficulties such as cyberbullying or sexual harassment online”

Enabling mediation balances promotion and protection, and parents have an active role in their child's social/digital media exposure by encouraging open and constructive discussion. The method is centered around the parent's explanation and evaluation of social media and aims to develop empathy, critical thinking, and other vital skills of competent communicators in children.

Observant mediation allows children to engage in social/digital media without intervention or supervision. This method is best used with older adolescents using social media, which provides a space for "self-expression, socializing, and the exchange of knowledge," and can educate users on digital literacy and online interpersonal communication in valuable areas. In this stage, it is important for parents to be aware of social media "...tak[ing] away from interpersonal relationships that nurture social skills…" and potential struggles with "self-esteem, social comparison, and peer connections."

In conclusion, scholars encourage parents to combine both techniques, allowing their children privacy while providing them security, maintaining an open line of communication, and creating a positive atmosphere around social media to prevent mental harm.

== The lens social media creates ==
A 2017 Washington Post study found that 55% of people who got plastic surgery did so to appear better in selfie pictures. Social media has created an environment in which people look at themselves through a unique lens. This lens may showcase whether the person is deemed worthy and whether they meet the requirements to fit into modern day society. At its core, social media is a place where people compare themselves and constantly attempt to better their online appearance as evidenced by the aforementioned study conducted in the Washington Post. There is not one set lens that people use to compare themselves, rather people can view themselves in any manner that is applicable to their lives. This the reason that people that come from poorer backgrounds and broken families are more likely to abuse social media. According to the study Sociodemographic factors and social media use in 9-year-old children: the Generation R Study, children from poorer backgrounds or broken homes are significantly more likely to abuse social media and use it. In the study they were found to have a more negative impacts to their lives when compared to children coming from wealthier and more stable families. This is because they are using it as an escape or that they are viewing social media through their lens and our developing mental health problems when they see people that have perceived better lives than them.

Living with everyday evaluations

Because social media plays such a significant role within society, our everyday lives are filled with constant evaluations based on the feedback we receive on social media. Blake Hallinan and Jed R. Brubaker (2021) discuss the significance of the "like" button on social media platforms, such as Facebook, Instagram, and Twitter, as an online form of evaluation. They explain that the like button is more than just a positive or good status update but is now interpreted as a "currency for self-esteem and belonging" (p. 1). To understand how social media users interpret likes they receive on their accounts, the researchers conducted in-depth interviews consisting of twenty-five self-identified artists who actively use Instagram to share their artwork. Hallinan and Brubaker explain they chose to interview artists is because artists take a lot of pride in their work and can be significantly influenced by the feedback they receive. The interview consisted of questions regarding the participants' artwork, experience, and knowledge of Instagram, and their interpretation of the networks like button. Based on the responses from the interviewers, the researchers found that some participants were unaffected by the number of likes they received from the posts of their artwork. However, they did find that the artists who were deeply affected by the feedback on their Instagram posts experienced doubt within their artwork and personally. As a result, their personal self-esteem decreased. Overall, the researchers emphasized the impact of likes among social media users and concluded that the like button is more than just a good rating, but a personal approval.

== The need to belong ==
=== Belongingness ===
Belongingness is the personal experience of being involved in a system or group. There are two major components of belongingness which are the feeling of being valued or needed in the group and fitting into the group. The sense of belongingness is said to stem from attachment theories. Neubaum and Kramer (2015) state that individuals with a greater desire to form attachments, have a stronger need for belonging in a group.

Roy Baumeister and Mark Leary discussed the need to belong theory in a paper in 1995. They discuss the strong effects of belongingness and stated that humans have a "basic desire to form social attachments." Without social interactions, we are deprived of emotions and are prone to more illness, physical and psychological, in the future. In 2010, Judith Gere and Geoff MacDonald found inconsistencies in the research done on this topic and reported updated findings. Research still supported that lack of social interactions lead to negative outcomes in the future. When these needs were not met, an individual's daily life seemed to be negatively affected. However, questions about an individual's interpersonal problems, such as sensitivity and self-regulation, still seem to be unknown. In today's world, social media may be the outlet in which the need to belong theory is fulfilled for individuals.

=== Perceived social closeness ===
Social media platforms such as Facebook, Twitter, etc. are updated daily to include details of people's personal lives and what they are doing. This in turn gives the perception of being close to people without actually speaking with them. Individuals contribute to social media by 'liking' posts, commenting, updating statuses, tweeting, posting photos, videos and more. In Norway, a study was completed with 27 teens aged 15-18. The study found a positive relationship between social media and teens. It allowed them to connect with others online increasing the feeling of inclusion and raised their self esteem.

Sixty Facebook users were recruited in a study by Neubaum and Kramer (2015) to take part in a series of questionnaires, spend ten minutes on Facebook and then complete a post-Facebook perceptions and an emotional status questionnaires. These individuals perceived more social closeness on Facebook that lead to maintaining relationships. Individuals with a higher need to belong also relied on Facebook, but in more private messages. This allowed these individuals to belong in a one-on-one setting or in a more personal way with a group of members who are more significant to them. Active Facebook users, individuals who posted and contributed to their newsfeed, had a greater sense of social closeness, whereas passive Facebook users, who only viewed posts and did not contribute to the newsfeed, had a lesser sense of social closeness. These findings indicate that social closeness and belonging on social media is dependent on the individual's own interactions and usage style.

=== Group membership ===
In a study conducted by Cohen & Lancaster (2014), 451 individuals were asked to complete a survey online. The results suggested that social media usage during television viewing made individuals feel like they were watching the shows in a group setting. Different emotional reactions to the show, were found on all social media platforms due to hashtags of the specific show. These emotional reactions were due to certain parts of the show, reactions to characters, and commenting on the overall show. In this way, social media enhanced people's social interactions just as if they were face-to-face co-viewing television. Individuals with high needs to belong can use social media to participate in social interactions regularly, in a broader sense (Cohen & Lancaster, 2014). Social media has the tendency of making people viral over night and not always in their best interest. Especially cases like woman from Pakistan who became a meme in Pakistan overnight and she got abandoned by her community The relationship of virtual and real is closely intertwined and it has direct and in certain cases devastating effect on people's relationships and their belongingness to their groups.

== See also ==
- Instagram's impact on people
- Social media abuse against women athletes
