= Greater Than One (song) =

">One (Greater Than One)"

Single by Ericdoa

from the album VALORANT Sounds, Vol. 1
- Released: March 4, 2023
- Length: 2:10
- Label: Riot Games, Inc.
- Songwriter: Eric Lopez
- Producers: ericdoa; Glasear; zetra; Mochila

">One (Greater Than One)" (stylized in all lowercase) is a single by American rapper Ericdoa, released on March 4, 2023. The song is the ninth track on Valorant's VALORANT Sounds, Vol. 1.

== Background ==
Ericdoa partnered with Riot Games and Valorant to create ">one." The song is the theme song for Valorant's "agent" trailer, Gekko. The song is composed of elements in hyperpop, emo-rap, and trap. In an interview, Ericdoa was asked about his collaboration with Valorant, responding with "The chemistry was immediately felt." ">one" references Valorant in its lyrics.

== Reception ==
After release, the track become Ericdoa's second-most-popular song on Spotify, with over 36 million streams total.
