= Maajins =

American rapper and record producer (born 2007)

- Maajins in 2025

Background information
- Born: Semaj Nuck Nelson; September 27, 2007 (age 19); Ontario, Canada
- Genres: Hip hop; R&B; trap; plugg
- Occupations: Record producer; songwriter; rapper; singer
- Years active: 2021–present
- Member of: StepTeam, 1500

Semaj Nelson (born September 27, 2007), professionally known as Maajins (stylized in lowercase), is an American singer-songwriter, rapper, and record producer. He is known for producing Slump6s and Tana's song "Antisocial" and its sequel, both of which gained significant traction online. He is a member of the online producer collective StepTeam.

== Early life ==
Semaj Nuck Nelson was born on September 27, 2007, in New Jersey. His parents were music-influenced, with his mother being a former singer while his father was a former DJ. He started making music at the age of ten, using his dad's spare equipment. He would also watch Nick Mira tutorial videos on how to use FL Studio.

== Career ==
Maajins performing live in Atlanta, Georgia in 2025.

He first started gaining traction with the release of American rapper Tana's single "Antisocial" with fellow American rapper Slump6s. As well as the sequel to it, dubbed "Antisocial 2", which featured the duo of Slump6s and tana, but also saw them recruit SSGKobe, Yung Fazo, and Xhulooo. Around this time, Nelson would also begin rapping. On August 16, 2021, Maajins would release "8Lbs", a collaborative track featuring rapper Xhulooo. In December, he would release "MILLIONS?" with Shyllomoo and Jonoftf.

In 2022, Nelson released his debut album Lost Files V1, which had eight tracks and a feature from Jaydes. The same year, on November 25, 2022, he would go on to release his second album, Forgiveness, which would also have eight tracks, and features from Jonoftf, Slump6s and Sadad Gotmmm.

In 2023, Nelson released the album Teenage Feelings. According to Alphonse Pierre of Pitchfork, he wrote how the album saw Nelson "polish up his elastic melodic style" and that the track was "the must-hear rap song of the day" off the album was "Outlaw".

In 2024, Nelson released his solo album, Ivy, which had ten tracks. He later released Enjoy the Ride in September.

== Discography ==
=== Studio albums ===
- Teenage Feelings (2023)
- Ivy (2024)
- Enjoy the Ride (2024)
- No, Superhero (2025)

=== Singles ===
- "Outlaw" (2023)
- "Antisocial" (With tana and Slump6s) (2021)
- "Antisocial 2" (2021)

== Awards ==
Region	Certification	Certified units/sales	Ref
United States (RIAA)	Gold	500,000	
