= Back in Action (EP) =

- Standard cover (Note: The deluxe edition cover features a colorized version of the same image)

EP by Midwxst
- Released: September 21, 2021
- Genre: Hip-hop
- Length: 20:33
- Labels: Simple Stupid; Geffen
- Producers: Benjicold; Elxnce; Ezra; FortuneSwan; Jaasu; Midwxst; Mochila; Outtatown; Rio Leyva; Roy Lenzo; Star Boy; Toba; Vvspipes; Zetra

Midwxst chronology
Summer03 (2021)	Back in Action (2021)	Better Luck Next Time (2022)

Singles from Back in Action
- 1. "Made It Back" Released: July 21, 2021; 2. "Tic Tac Toe" Released: August 11, 2021; 3. "All Talk" Released: August 25, 2021

Back in Action is the third extended play (EP) by the American singer and rapper Midwxst. It was released by Simple Stupid and Geffen Records on September 21, 2021, as his second release with the labels after emerging in the 2020 digicore scene. He had the goal of creating a more rap-focused release so he could play the music at his live shows to encourage mosh pits and having fun. Inspired by various musicians, he produced the EP along with a variety of record producers. It contains guest appearances from Tana, Slump6s, Ericdoa, and Kashdami.

Back in Action is an energetic hip-hop EP. Certain tracks were compared to albums like The Life of Pablo (2016) and Whole Lotta Red (2020) by Pitchfork, and the EP pushed Midwxst further into the mainstream. The EP received a positive review from Pitchfork and gained further approval from HotNewHipHop. Back in Action was supported by three singles and a tour across North America during October and November 2021. A deluxe edition, titled Back in Action 2.0, was released in December 2021, with four additional tracks.

== Background and recording ==
Midwxst emerged as an artist during the digicore scene in 2020. He released his second extended play (EP), Summer03, in March 2021, and signed with Geffen Records in June 2021. Though he is often classified as a hyperpop artist, he thinks that the label is overused, and fans will classify his pop or rap songs as hyperpop. On Back in Action, he had the goal of creating a more rap-focused release, as well as making music that could be played at live shows. He did not want to only sing sad songs live, and instead wanted to see audience members create mosh pits and have fun. He was influenced by rappers such as XXXTentacion, Ski Mask the Slump God, and Denzel Curry to create energetic and aggressive music. Some songs on Back in Action were also inspired by musicians like Bill Withers, Marvin Gaye, and Skrillex. Production on the EP was handled by a variety of record producers, including Midwxst himself, and contains guest appearances from Tana, Slump6s, Ericdoa, and Kashdami. Midwxst described the studio session where he recorded the EP track "Slide" with Slump6s and Ericdoa as "one of the funniest studio sessions [he has] ever been in". He also named "Slide", along with "Tic Tac Toe", as standout tracks in his discography.

== Composition ==
Back in Action is a hip-hop EP that "bridges the gap between hyperpop and hip-hop more than ever before", according to NME's Ben Jolley. Nancy Jiang from HotNewHipHop thought, although Midwxst "specializes in hyperpop", the EP "proves that he isn't limited to the genre", and called Midwxst's music energetic. Sam Goldner of Pitchfork wrote that, "for the first two thirds of the EP, each track slams into the next, ratcheting up the dial further and further". He also commented on how the EP begins "with plenty of energy, but by the end you can feel the inevitable sugar crash setting in".

Back in Action's opening track is "Let It Rip", an R&B track with an "addictive bubblegum beat", according to Jiang. It is followed by "All Talk", which showcases Midwxst switching between rhythmic patterns and a double-time bridge. His verse is underlined by a house bassline, and includes a line about feeling out of place in school; it is then followed by him singing about riding in a Mercedes-Benz. "Putting On" features Tana, and is followed by "Tic Tac Toe". The latter's instrumental contains Super Smash Bros. sound effects, and the song contains humorous lyricism; a lyric is written about Perry the Platypus from the television series Phineas and Ferb. "Star" and "Slide" with Slump6s and featuring Ericdoa both have a sound reminiscent of Whole Lotta Red (2020) by the American rapper Playboi Carti, according to Goldner. The penultimate track of the standard edition, "Made It Back", has a hook that is written about having a goal of making his mother proud. It, alongside the final track "LA" featuring Kashdami, have mellow synthesizers reminiscent of The Life of Pablo (2016) by the American rapper Kanye West, according to Goldner. "LA" is a sonically smooth track which showcases Midwxst's sing-rap abilities. The deluxe edition of Back in Action offers four bonus tracks: "Chowder", "Off the Wall", "Transformer" featuring Onlybino! and Xhulooo, and "No Smoke" featuring DC the Don.

== Release and reception ==
Professional ratings
Review scores
Source	Rating
Pitchfork	7.2/10

Back in Action's lead single "Made It Back" was released on July 21, 2021. It was followed by "Tic Tac Toe" on August 11, and "All Talk" on August 25. The EP was released by Simple Stupid and Geffen Records on September 21, 2021; Back in Action is his first EP released under the label. Midwxst embarked on the Back in Action Tour, which passed through the United States, during October and November 2021. He would open the shows with the EP song "Star". A deluxe edition of the EP, titled Back in Action 2.0, was released on December 15, 2021.

Following its release, Back in Action received a positive review from Pitchfork. Goldner lauded Midwxst's ability to highlight the importance of SoundCloud rap to hyperpop, while maintaining the latter genre's charm. He also thought the EP pushed Midwxst further into the mainstream, and enjoyed hearing Midwxst mold "the current trends of hip-hop to fit his hyperactive vision". Though, Goldner felt the tracks "Made It Back" and "LA" limited the impact of Midwxst's vocals. Joe Hale of Clash also believed the EP was able to take Midwxst into the mainstream. Jiang thought the EP allowed him to cement "his spot as one of the most promising, addictive additions to hyperpop".

== Track listing ==
Back in Action track listing
No.	Title	Writer(s)	Producer(s)	Length
1.	"Let It Rip"	Edgar Nathaniel Sarratt III; James Addison	Benjicold	2:16
2.	"All Talk"	Sarratt III; Logan Cartwright; Tobias Dekker; Anton Martin Mendo	Elxnce; Midwxst; Outtatown; Star Boy	3:06
3.	"Putting On" (featuring Tana)	Sarratt III; Addison; Steven D. Lewis	Benjicold	2:25
4.	"Tic Tac Toe"	Sarratt III; Michael Pieper	Vvspipes	2:58
5.	"Star"	Sarratt III; Pieper	Vvspipes	2:03
6.	"Slide" (with Slump6s and featuring Ericdoa)	Sarratt III; Namil Bridges; Alain Cartaya; Rio Francesco Leyva; Eric Lopez; Liam Magrini; Pieper; Ricardo Rodriguez	FortuneSwan; Leyva; Mochila; Vvspipes; Zetra	2:57
7.	"Made It Back"	Sarratt III; Cartwright; Roy Lenzo; Isa Nasir Al-Deen Perkins	Elxnce; Lenzo; Toba	1:40
8.	"LA" (featuring Kashdami)	Sarratt III; Ezra Abbey; Jaasu Mallory	Ezra; Jaasu	3:08
Total length:				20:33

Back in Action 2.0 track listing
No.	Title	Writer(s)	Producer(s)	Length
9.	"Chowder"	Sarratt III; Jordan Ortiz; Konstantin Pyzhov; Nelida Yew	Kimchi; Nest; Oogie Mane	3:38
10.	"Off the Wall"	Sarratt III; Malikai Temesgen	Malikaix8	2:09
11.	"Transformer" (featuring Onlybino! and Xhulooo)	Sarratt III; Arturo LaMotta; Demar McCrew; Temesgen	Malikaix8	4:26
12.	"No Smoke" (featuring DC the Don)	Sarratt III; Daijon Cotty Davis; Xavier Deltomme; Christopher Taylor Morgan; Michael Santoni	4evr; Delto; Morgan	3:26
Total length:				34:12

Notes

- "LA" stands for "Los Angeles".

== Personnel ==
Credits adapted from Tidal.

Standard edition

- Midwxst – vocals, recording, songwriting
- Mike Tucci – mastering
- Drew Sliger – mixing, engineering
- Benjicold – programming (1, 3), songwriting (1, 3), production (1, 3)
- Elxnce – programming (2, 7), songwriting (2, 7), production (2, 7)
- Outtatown – programming (2), songwriting (2), production (2)
- Star Boy – programming (2), songwriting (2), production (2)
- Tana – vocals (3), songwriting (3)
- Vvspipes – programming (5, 6), songwriting (4–6), production (4–6)
- FortuneSwan – programming (6), songwriting (6), production (6)
- Mochila – programming (6), songwriting (6), production (6)
- Rio Leyva – programming (6), songwriting (6), production (6)
- Zetra – programming (6), songwriting (6), production (6)
- Slump6s – vocals (6), songwriting (6)
- Ericdoa – vocals (6), songwriting (6)
- Roy Lenzo – programming (7), songwriting (7), production (7)
- Toba – programming (7), songwriting (7), production (7)
- Ezra – programming (8), songwriting (8), production (8)
- Jaasu – programming (8), songwriting (8), production (8)

Deluxe edition

- Midwxst – vocals, recording, songwriting
- Mike Tucci – mastering
- Drew Sliger – mixing, engineering
- Kimchi – programming (9), songwriting (9), production (9)
- Nest – programming (9), songwriting (9), production (9)
- Oogie Mane – programming (9), songwriting (9), production (9)
- Malikaix8 – programming (10, 11), songwriting (10, 11), production (10, 11)
- Onlybino! – vocals (11), songwriting (11)
- Xhulooo – vocals (11), songwriting (11)
- 4evr – programming (12), songwriting (12), production (12)
- Delto – programming (12), songwriting (12), production (12)
- Taylor Morgan – programming (12), songwriting (12), production (12)
- DC the Don – vocals (12), songwriting (12)

== Release history ==
Region	Date	Format(s)	Label	Edition	Ref.
Worldwide	September 22, 2021	Streaming; digital download	Simple Stupid; Geffen	Original	
Worldwide	December 15, 2021	Streaming; digital download	Simple Stupid; Geffen	Deluxe	
