= Slump6s =

American rapper (born 2004)

- Also known as: Dakota
- Born: Namil Bridges; December 20, 2004 (age 21); Rochester, New York, US
- Genres: Hip hop; trap
- Occupations: Rapper; songwriter
- Years active: 2018–present
- Label: Casket Records

Namil Bridges (born December 20, 2004), known professionally as Slump6s (pronounced "Slump success"), is an American rapper from Rochester, New York. He gained recognition for his single "Antisocial", a collaboration with American rapper tana, as well as his song "Mental", with producer Whethan and fellow musician Glaive.

== Early life ==
Namil Bridges was born on December 20, 2004 in Rochester, New York. At the age of six, Slump6s started recording in his father's music studio, taking inspiration from videos of Michael Jackson that he would obsessively watch. As a child, he would play orchestral instrumentals in a band and listen to artists like XXXTentacion, Ski Mask the Slump God, Lil Uzi Vert, and Tyler, the Creator.

== Career ==
He first started gaining traction with the release of his single "Antisocial" with fellow teenage rapper Tana. In 2021, he released his debut mixtape Origin. In April 2022, he and rapper Iayze began an online altercation culminating in the release of diss tracks like "3piece" and "No Children 2 (I'm Him)". On April 29, 2022, he appeared on producer Whethan's studio album Midnight, where he was featured on the track "MENTAL" with other fellow artist Glaive. In July 2022, he released his debut studio album Genesis with appearances from rappers Destroy Lonely and Sgpwes. In September 2022, he appeared on Ka$hdami's mixtape World Damination on the track "Relax". On April 7, 2023, Slump6s released his second studio album Forgive Never Forget, with a feature from Maajins.

On October 20, 2023, Slump6s released Exodus, with features from Dvertigo and OsamaSon. On June 21, 2024, he released Glory 2 in the summer, with a solo feature from Lil Gnar. On December 6, 2024 Slump6s released Salvation, and followed with the deluxe of it just two weeks later, on December 20. The deluxe had an additional ten tracks with a feature from Bandanna$aint. Then, eight days later, on December 28, Slump6s released his final single of the year, titled "Lmk" with Hooligan Lou. In 2025, Slump6s did not release much, besides a simple single, titled "Halftime", which released on March 21, 2025. He released his fourth studio album Mayhem on April 3, 2026.

== Awards ==
Region	Certification	Certified units/sales	Ref.
United States (RIAA)	Gold	500,000	

== Discography ==
=== Albums ===
Title	Details
Genesis	Released: July 22, 2022; Label: Self-released; Formats: Digital download, streaming
Exodus	Released: October 20, 2023; Label: Self-released; Formats: Digital download, streaming
Salvation	Released: December 6, 2024; Label: Self-released; Formats: Digital download, streaming
Mayhem	Released: April 3, 2026; Label: Self-released; Formats: Digital download, streaming

=== Mixtapes ===
Title	Details
Origin	Released: November 17, 2021; Label: Self-released; Formats: Digital download, streaming
Glory 2	Released: June 21, 2024; Label: Self-released; Formats: Digital download, streaming

=== Extended plays ===
Title	Details
Naveah	Released: March 13, 2020; Label: Self-released; Formats: Digital download, streaming
16	Released: December 19, 2020; Label: Self-released; Formats: Digital download, streaming
Dakotaromani (With Tana)	Released: May 29, 2021; Label: Self-released; Formats: Digital download, streaming
Origin (Lost Files)	Released: November 17, 2021; Label: Self-released; Formats: Digital download, streaming
B4 Gen	Released: June 24, 2022; Label: Self-released; Formats: Digital download, streaming
Rebirth	Released: September 6, 2022; Label: Self-released; Formats: Digital download, streaming
Glory	Released: September 18, 2022; Label: Self-released; Formats: Digital download, streaming
S 18	Released: December 20, 2022; Label: Self-released; Formats: Digital download, streaming
Reality	Released: January 14, 2023; Label: Self-released; Formats: Digital download, streaming
Emotion	Released: April 3, 2023; Label: Self-released; Formats: Digital download, streaming
Forgive Never Forget	Released: April 7, 2023; Label: Self-released; Formats: Digital download, streaming
Sin	Released: April 30, 2023; Label: Self-released; Formats: Digital download, streaming
6/17	Released: June 17, 2023; Label: Self-released; Formats: Digital download, streaming
5	Released: August 6, 2023; Label: Self-released; Formats: Digital download, streaming
1220	Released: December 20, 2023; Label: Self-released; Formats: Digital download, streaming
V2	Released: January 7, 2024; Label: Self-released; Formats: Digital download, streaming
Malice	Released: November 29, 2024; Label: Self-released; Formats: Digital download, streaming
Salvation (Deluxe)	Released: December 20, 2024; Label: Self-released; Formats: Digital download, streaming
Luv	Released: February 14, 2025; Label: Self-released; Formats: Digital download, streaming
