= Midwxst =

American rapper and singer from Indiana (born 2003)

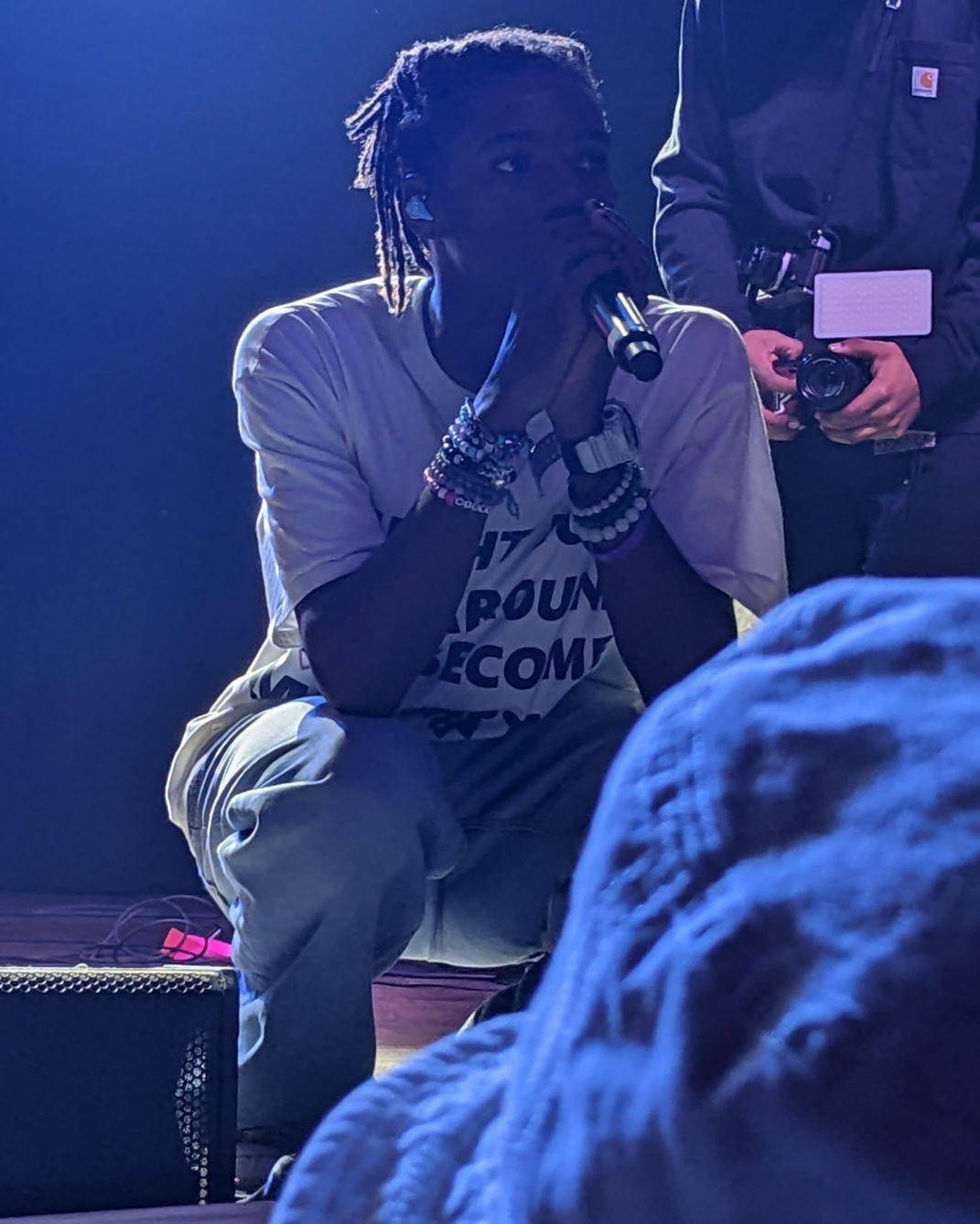
- Midwxst performing in Philadelphia, 2022

Background information
- Also known as: $uspect; E3
- Born: Edgar Nathaniel Sarratt III; June 5, 2003 (age 23); Columbia, South Carolina, U.S.
- Origin: Indianapolis, Indiana, U.S.
- Genres: Hyperpop; pop; hip hop; trap; emo rap; rage; digicore
- Occupations: Singer; rapper; songwriter
- Instrument: Vocals
- Years active: 2018–present
- Labels: Simple Stupid; Geffen Records
- Member of: Helix Tears
- Formerly of: Novagang

Edgar Nathaniel Sarratt III (born June 5, 2003), known professionally as Midwxst (stylized in all lowercase), is an American musician. Initially presenting a digicore sound, he began releasing music as $uspect in 2018 and released several extended plays between 2020 and 2022, including Back In Action (2021), Summer03 (2021), Better Luck Next Time. (2022), and Back In Action 3.0 (2022). Midwxst's debut studio album, E3, was released in September 2023. On Midwxst's musical style, sources mostly defined it as hyperpop, but he makes rap music as well. His second album, Archangel, was released in June 2025. His third album, Solitude In Silence was released in July 2026.

== Early life ==
Edgar Nathaniel Sarratt III was born on June 5, 2003, in Columbia, South Carolina. His father worked in the Air Force, and his mother worked as a Human Resources Executive, he also has an older sister. Saratt was diagnosed with attention deficit hyperactivity disorder when he was young. He attended Park Tudor School for high school. Saratt joined the Park Tudor School band and started making music as early as his sophomore year in high school.

== Career ==
Based in Indiana, Sarratt would originally release his freestyle songs to SoundCloud. Towards the beginning of the COVID-19 pandemic, during the lockdowns, Midwxst would become involved in the early hyperpop scene had released his song "Trying" on November 20, 2020. Which would eventually garner traction online. The song had sat at over 5 million streams on Spotify as of October 2021. He embarked on a tour with Glaive in June 2022. Midwxst released E3, his debut studio album, in November 2023. In 2024, he released Back In Action 4.0. In 2025, he released Archangel, and in 2026, he released Solitude In Silence.

Throughout his career, Sarratt had collaborated with the Internet rap collective Novagang.

== Artistry ==
Sarratt's musical style has been described as digicore hyperpop. He grew up listening to Kanye West, TLC, Aaliyah, and Beyoncé from his mother, while his father listened to hip hop. Sarratt cites Tyler, the Creator, Frank Ocean, Spitalfield, KT Tunstall, XXXTentacion, Porter Robinson, and Pi'erre Bourne as music influences.

== Discography ==
=== Studio albums ===
Title	Album details
E3	Released: September 1, 2023; Label: Geffen Records; Format: LP, digital download, streaming
Archangel	Released: June 20, 2025; Label: Broke; Format: Digital download, streaming
Solitude In Silence	Released: July 24, 2026; Label: Rebellion Records; Format: Digital download, streaming

=== Mixtapes ===
Title	Album details
Back in Action 4.0	Released: July 19, 2024; Label: Underground Sound; Format: Digital download, streaming

=== EPs ===
Title	EP details
Secrets	Released: October 16, 2020; Label: Self-released (initial release), Simple Stupid/Geffen Records (re-release); Format: Digital download, streaming
Summer03	Released: March 26, 2021; Label: Self-released (initial release), Simple Stupid/Geffen Records (re-release); Format: Digital download, streaming
Back in Action	Released: September 22, 2021; Deluxe: December 15, 2021; Label: Simple Stupid/Geffen Records; Format: Digital download, streaming
Better Luck Next Time.	Released: March 16, 2022; Label: Simple Stupid/Geffen Records; Format: Digital download, streaming
Back in Action 3.0	Released: September 7, 2022; Label: Simple Stupid/Geffen Records; Format: Digital download, streaming

=== As lead artist ===
Title	Year	Album
"Liar"	2020	Summer03
"Disrespect!"	2020	Non-album single
"Final Breath"	2020	Summer03
"Twofaced"	2020	Non-album singles
"Cantu (By My Lonely)"	2020	Non-album singles
"Mean Girls"	2020	Non-album singles
"Tysm"	2020	Non-album singles
"Troops" (featuring Wido and Osquinn)	2020	Non-album singles
"Wonder (I Have a Dream)"	2020	Non-album singles
"Blastoise"	2020	Non-album singles
"Identity"	2020	Non-album singles
"Threefaced"	2020	Secrets
"Backseat" (featuring Aldn)	2020	Secrets
"By Your Side" (featuring Blackwinterwells and 8485)	2020	Secrets
"Trying"	2020	Summer03
"Ruthless"	2021	Non-album single
"Made It Back"	2021	Back in Action
"Tic Tac Toe"	2021	Back in Action
"All Talk"	2021	Back in Action
"Care"	2021	Non-album singles
"Shame"	2021	Non-album singles
"Bluffing"	2021	Non-album singles
"Riddle"	2022	Better Luck Next Time.
"I Know You Hate Me"	2022	Better Luck Next Time.
"Sidelines"	2022	Non-album singles
"Broken"	2022	Non-album singles
"Under Fire"	2022	Non-album singles
"Slide Den"	2022	Non-album singles
"Tally" (with Denzel Curry)	2023	Non-album singles
"Pretty Girls"	2023	E3
"Warning"	2023	E3
"Mistakes" (featuring 9lives)	2024	Non-album single
"Fire" (featuring DC The Don)	2024	Back in Action 4.0
"E30"	2024	Back in Action 4.0
"Gun Smoke"	2024	Back in Action 4.0
"No Handouts"	2024	Archangel
"I Told U"	2025	Archangel
"Hostile"	2025	Archangel
"Been There Done That"	2026	Non-album singles
"New Year New Swag"	2026	Solitude In Silence
"Don't Trust"	2026	Solitude In Silence
"For Real"	2026	Solitude In Silence
