= Glaive discography =

American musician discography

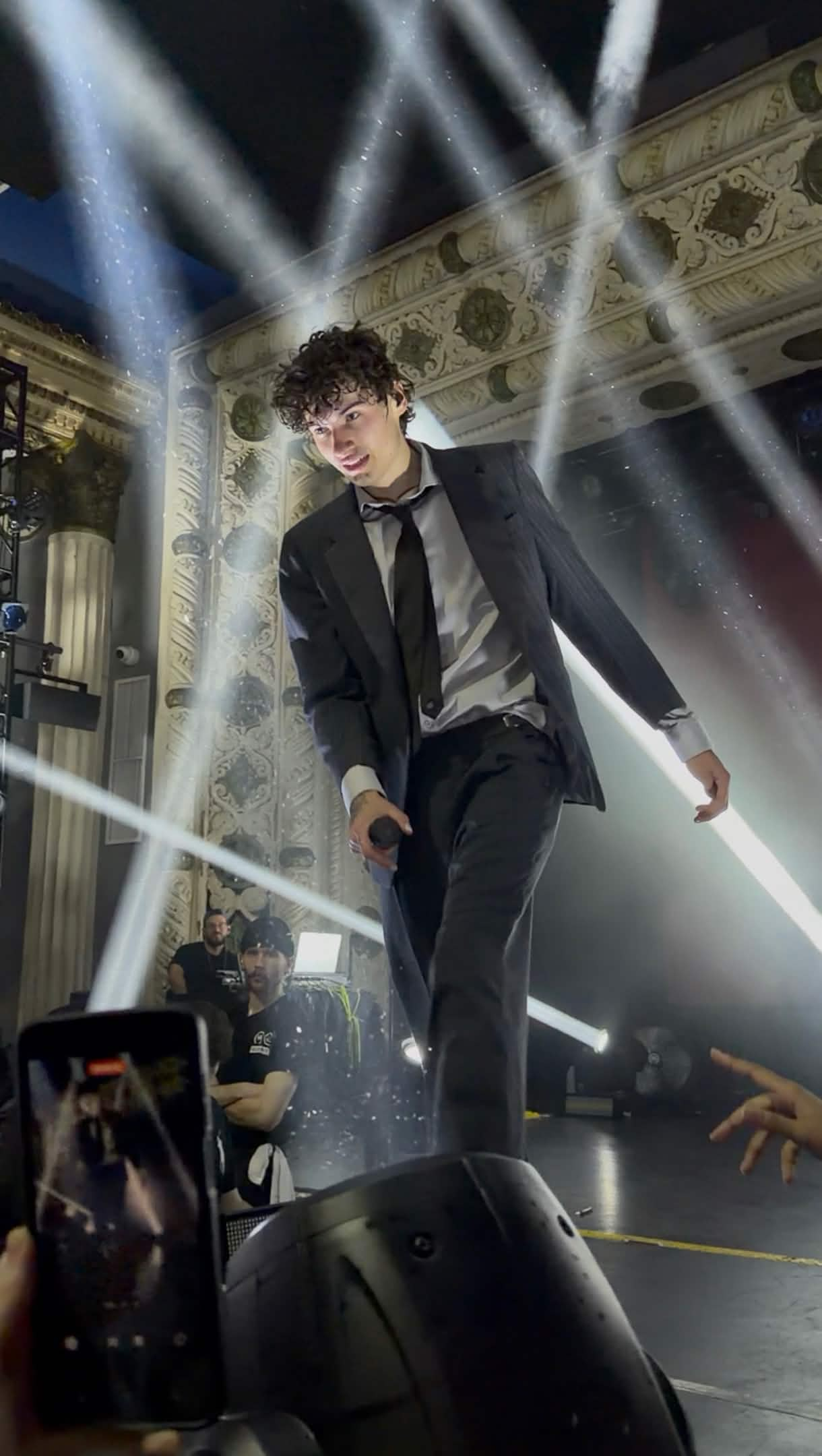
- Glaive performing in Chicago, Illinois, 2026
- Studio albums: 3
- EPs: 5
- Singles: 32
- Music videos: 34
- Deluxe EPs: 1
- Remix albums: 1

American musician Glaive has released three studio albums, five extended plays, one deluxe extended play, one remix album, thirty two singles, and thirty four music videos. His remix album, one of his extended plays, and four of his singles were released under the pseudonym Ovine Hall. His extended plays Cypress Grove in 2020, All Dogs Go to Heaven and Then I'll Be Happy in 2021, and A Bit of a Mad One in 2024, as well as his debut studio album I Care So Much That I Don't Care at All in 2023, were released under Interscope Records. He released his second studio album, May It Never Falter, independently in 2024. Additionally, all of his music as Ovine Hall has been released independently. He released his third studio album, Y'all, in 2025 under Broke Records.

== Albums ==
=== Studio albums ===
Title	Details
I Care So Much That I Don't Care at All	Released: July 14, 2023; Label: Interscope; Format: LP, CD, digital download, streaming
May It Never Falter	Released: October 11, 2024; Label: Slowsilver03 (self-released); Format: LP, digital download, streaming
Y'all	Released: September 26, 2025; Label: Broke, Slowsilver03; Format: LP, digital download, streaming
God Save The Three (with kurtains)	Released: May 8, 2026; Label: Broke, Slowsilver03; Format: LP, digital download, streaming
Polesden Lacey	Scheduled: January 22, 2027; Label: Slowsilver03 (self-released); Format: LP, CD, digital download, streaming

=== Remix albums ===
==== As Ovine Hall ====
Title	Details
If You Feel God’s Silence Remember the Teacher Doesn’t Talk During the Test	Released: June 1, 2025; Label: Slowsilver03 (self-released); Format: Streaming

== Extended plays ==
As Glaive

Title	Details
Cypress Grove	Released: November 19, 2020; Label: Interscope; Format: LP, digital download, streaming
All Dogs Go to Heaven	Released: August 6, 2021; Label: Interscope; Format: Digital download, streaming
Then I'll Be Happy (with Ericdoa)	Released: October 6, 2021; Label: Interscope; Format: Digital download, streaming
A Bit of a Mad One	Released: February 23, 2024; Label: Interscope; Format: Digital download, streaming

As Ovine Hall

Title	Details
Ovine Hall	Released: May 14, 2023; Label: Self-released; Format: Digital download, streaming
Things I Forgot About	Released: December 10, 2025; Label: Slowsilver03 (self-released); Format: Digital download, streaming

=== Deluxe extended plays ===
Title	Details
Old Dog, New Tricks	Released: January 27, 2022; Label: Interscope; Format: LP, digital download, streaming

== Singles ==
=== As lead artist ===
==== As Glaive ====
Title	Year	Album
"Life Is Pain"	2020	Non-album singles
"Sick"	2020	Non-album singles
"Astrid"	2020	Cypress Grove
"Pissed"	2020	Cypress Grove
"Clover"	2020	Non-album singles
"Arsenic"	2020	Non-album singles
"Touché"	2020	Cypress Grove
"Eyesore"	2020	Cypress Grove
"Cloak n Dagger" (with Ericdoa)	2021	Then I'll Be Happy
"I Wanna Slam My Head Against the Wall"	2021	All Dogs Go to Heaven
"What Was the Last Thing U Said" (with Aldn)	2021	Greenhouse
"Fall Apart" (with Renforshort)	2021	Off Saint Dominique
"Detest Me"	2021	All Dogs Go to Heaven
"Fuck This Town" (with Ericdoa)	2021	Then I'll Be Happy
"Bastard"	2021	All Dogs Go to Heaven
"Prick"	2021	Old Dog, New Tricks
"Minnesota Is a Place That Exists"	2022	Non-album singles
"Three Wheels and It Still Drives!"	2022	Non-album singles
"As If"	2023	I Care So Much That I Don't Care at All
"I'm Nothing That's All I Am"	2023	I Care So Much That I Don't Care at All
"All I Do Is Try My Best"	2023	I Care So Much That I Don't Care at All
"The Car"	2023	I Care So Much That I Don't Care at All
"Huh"	2024	A Bit of a Mad One
"Even When the Sun Is Dead, Will You Tell Them How Hard I Tried"	2024	A Bit of a Mad One
"I Don't Really Feel It Anymore"	2024	A Bit of a Mad One
"Tijuana Freestyle"	2024	Non-album single
"Just Not Sure" (with Kurtains)	2024	Florence Fields
"Live & Direct" (with Kurtains)	2024	May It Never Falter
"Asheville"	2025	Y'all
"Appalachia"	2025	Y'all
"The Troubles"	2026	God Save The Three
"Meant to Be" (with Tiffany Day)	2026	Non-album single
"Asheghanistan"	2026	Polesden Lacey

==== As Ovine Hall ====
Title	Year	Album
"Pardon Me"	2024	Non-album singles
"Do It for Me"	2024	Non-album singles
"Pep"	2024	Non-album singles
"Victoria Beckham Freestyle"	2024	Non-album singles
"UK Bitches" (with Kurtains)	2025	Non-album singles
"3"	2026	Non-album singles
"Dearie"	2026	Non-album singles

=== As featured artist ===
Title	Year	Peak chart positions			Album
Title	Year	US Bub.	US Dance	NZ Hot	Album
"Reckless Luv" (Brodie Wilson featuring Glaive and Lucas Lex)	2020	—	—	—	Orbittee
"Opposite Ways" (Scruff featuring Glaive)	2020	—	—	—	Non-album singles
"Haribo (Demo)" (Daashiell featuring Glaive)	2020	—	—	—	Non-album singles
"Arroz Con Pollo" (Kassgocrazy featuring Glaive and Ericdoa)	2020	—	—	—	Non-album singles
"Mixed Signals" (Lovesickxo featuring Glaive)	2020	—	—	—	Non-album singles
"Robinz" (Misaku Foxx featuring Glaive and Monty Shawty)	2020	—	—	—	Non-album singles
"Headache" (2worth featuring Glaive)	2020	—	—	—	Non-album singles
"Complicated" (Numl6ck featuring Glaive)	2020	—	—	—	Non-album singles
"October's Lullaby" (Savage Gasp featuring Glaive)	2020	—	—	—	The Long Halloween
"Spinna" (Kurtains featuring Glaive, Wido, Ericdoa, One Year, Angelus and Kuru)	2020	—	—	—	Non-album singles
"It's All a Waste" (Ericdoa featuring Glaive)	2020	—	—	—	Non-album singles
"Redeyes" (Aldn featuring Glaive)	2020	—	—	—	Non-album singles
"111 Seconds in Heaven" (SyKo featuring Glaive)	2020	—	—	—	Non-album singles
"Think You Right" (Whethan featuring Ericdoa and Glaive)	2021	—	47	—	Midnight
"Mental" (Whethan featuring Slump6s and Glaive)	2022	—	—	—	Midnight
"More than Life" (MGK featuring Glaive)	2022	23	—	17	Mainstream Sellout (Life in Pink deluxe)
"Devo4ka" (9mice featuring Glaive)	2023	—	—	—	Orpheus
"—" denotes a recording that did not chart or was not released.

== Other charted songs ==
Title	Year	Peak chart positions	Album
Title	Year	US Rock	Album
"The Prom"	2023	47	I Care So Much That I Don't Care at All

== Guest appearances ==
Title	Year	Other artist(s)	Album
"Smile"	2021	Midwxst	Summer03
"Starlink"	2024	Toro y Moi	Hole Erth

== Music videos ==
Song	Year	Director
"Pissed"	2020	Daniel Jordan K
"Touché"	2020	Daniel Jordan K
"DND"	2020	Stefan Kohli
"Cloak n Dagger" (with Ericdoa)	2021	Jake Nanez
"Astrid"	2021	Hunter Ray Barker & Charlie Grant
"I Wanna Slam My Head Against the Wall"	2021	Steve Cannon
"What Was the Last Thing U Said" (with Aldn)	2021	Kevin Neal
"Fall Apart" (with Renforshort)	2021	Iris Kim
"Detest Me"	2021	Ramez Silyan
"Fuck This Town" (with Ericdoa)	2021	Unknown
"All Dogs Go to Heaven (Outro)"	2021	Ramez Silyan
"1984"	2021	Cole Bennett
"Mental Anguish" (with Ericdoa)	2021	Dito
"Prick"	2021	Mooch
"Heather" (with Ericdoa)	2021	Dito
"Minnesota Is a Place That Exists"	2022	Ramez Silyan
"Three Wheels and It Still Drives!"	2022	Ramez Silyan
"As If"	2023	Adrian Villagomez
"All I Do Is Try My Best"	2023	Adrian Villagomez
"The Car"	2023	Adrian Villagomez
"17250"	2023	Rachel Rinehardt
"Huh"	2024	Glaive
"Even When the Sun Is Dead, Will You Tell Them How Hard I Tried"	2024	Glaive
"I Don't Really Feel It Anymore"	2024	Glaive
"Living Proof (That It Hurts)"	2024	Tommy Pointer
"Tijuana Freestyle"	2024	Glaive
"Live & Direct" (with Kurtains)	2024	020baby
"For God and Country"	2024	Tommy Pointer
"Freudian"	2024	Tommy Pointer
"60.000 ISK"	2024	Tommy Pointer
"IK"	2025	Tak Kamihagi
"Asheville"	2025	Tommy Pointer
"We Don't Leave The House"	2025	Tommy Pointer
"Nouveau Riche"	2025	Bill Taylor
"It Is What It Is"	2025	020baby
“The Troubles”	2026	Lewis Baillie
“The Band”	2026	Lewis Baillie
"Flyen"	2026	Lewis Baillie
