= Fuck This Town =

Single by Glaive and Ericdoa

from the EP Then I'll Be Happy
- Released: July 9, 2021
- Genre: Pop
- Length: 1:55
- Label: Interscope; Listen to the Kids
- Songwriters: Ash Gutierrez; Eric Lopez; Jaehyun Kim; John Ong; Ethan Snoreck
- Producers: Glasear; Kimj; Whethan

Glaive singles chronology
"Detest Me" (2021)	"Fuck This Town" (2021)	"Bastard" (2021)

Ericdoa singles chronology
"Fantasize" (2021)	"Fuck This Town" (2021)	"Back n Forth" (2021)

Music video
- "Fuck This Town" on YouTube

"Fuck This Town" is a song by the American musicians Glaive and Ericdoa from their collaborative extended play (EP), Then I'll Be Happy (2021). It was released by Interscope Records and Listen to the Kids on July 9, 2021, as the EP's second single. The song was written by Glaive and Ericdoa alongside its producers, Glasear, Kimj, and Whethan. It was the first song the duo recorded during the second time they had met in person. It was the first song in which they wrote a hook together.

"Fuck This Town" is a pop song that also contains influences from emo and alternative music. The song is characterized by dance rhythms and a gloomy chorus performed atop drums. It was deemed a standout track from Then I'll Be Happy by reviewers; The Line of Best Fit considered it one of the best songs of 2021. The song was released alongside a music video.

== Background and release ==
Glaive and Ericdoa are frequent collaborators and are considered stars in the digicore scene. They teased collaborations with each other on their social media and released their collaborative extended play (EP), Then I'll Be Happy on October 6, 2021. They released its lead single, "Cloak n Dagger", on January 20, 2021. It was followed by "Fuck This Town" on July 9, which was released alongside a music video. It was the first song the duo recorded after they met in person for the second time. It was also the first song in which they wrote the hook together. Released through Interscope Records and Listen to the Kids, it appears as the eighth and final track on Then I'll Be Happy. Glaive and Ericdoa wrote the song alongside its producers, Glasear, Kimj, and Whethan, all of whom recorded the track. Prash 'Engine-Earz' Mistry handled the song's mixing.

== Composition ==
"Fuck This Town" is 1 minute and 55 seconds long. It is a pop song characterized by dance rhythms and a gloomy chorus performed atop drums. Its sound palette also draws from emo and alternative influences. The song's lyrics explore the desire to leave the town where one grew up. Mano Sundaresan of Pitchfork highlighted the track's "off-the-cuff arrangements" and described its songwriting as "confessional", writing that it "could be read as rap or emo". He also compared the mixing of the chorus to flashing strobe lights. The Chicago Reader's Leor Galil called it a "roof-destroying skewed-pop anthem".

== Critical reception ==
Sundaresan and Galil both named "Fuck This Town" a standout track from Then I'll Be Happy. Sundaresan called it a "thoughtful genre [exploration] that subvert norms instead of succumbing to them", while Galil said Glaive and Ericdoa "lock in together" on the track, stating "the possibilities feel endless". The staff from The Line of Best Fit considered "Fuck This Town" the 17th best song of 2021. Matthew Kent called it "an addictive angsty anthem" and "ultimately a manic manifestation of the future of pop". Derrick Rossignol for Uproxx said "it packs a lot of energy and hooks into its sub-two-minute runtime". Shaad D'Souza from Paper particularly lauded the song's hook; he called it "a perfect blast of energy for a pop hook" and hopes "it populates many teen diaries for years to come". In a negative review of Then I'll Be Happy for RapReviews, Steve "Flash" Juon stated that it could possibly "exceed the clichés of [emo rap] with some genuine effort", but felt the track did not do so. He further commented that the song "mimics the tropes of [emo rap] to the point of becoming parody".
