= I Care So Much That I Don't Care at All =

Studio album by Glaive
- Released: July 14, 2023
- Studio: Garage (Los Angeles)
- Genres: Emo; pop; rock
- Length: 35:34
- Label: Interscope
- Producers: Alexander 23; Ralph Castelli; Nick Ferraro; Jeff Hazin; Rodaidh McDonald; The Monsters & Strangerz; Michael Pollack; Underscores

Glaive chronology
Ovine Hall (2023)	I Care So Much That I Don't Care at All (2023)	A Bit of a Mad One (2024)

Singles from I Care So Much That I Don't Care at All
- 1. "As If" Released: April 28, 2023; 2. "I'm Nothing That's All I Am" Released: May 17, 2023; 3. "All I Do Is Try My Best" Released: June 7, 2023; 4. "The Car" Released: June 30, 2023

I Care So Much That I Don't Care at All (stylized in lowercase) is the debut studio album by the American musician Glaive, released on July 14, 2023, by Interscope Records. After gaining attention with a string of hyperpop songs released during the COVID-19 pandemic, Glaive signed a deal with Interscope, released three extended plays, and began collaborating with high-profile musicians. Glaive was inspired by bands and musicians such as Brand New, Modern Baseball, the 1975, Bon Iver, ABBA, and Mura Masa while recording the album in Los Angeles. The album was produced by returning collaborators Jeff Hazin and Ralph Castelli with contributions from Alexander 23, Underscores, Rodaidh McDonald, Nick Ferraro, Michael Pollack, and the Monsters & Strangerz.

I Care So Much That I Don't Care at All is primarily an emo, pop and rock album, a departure from Glaive's original hyperpop sound. The album shifts between desperation and hopefulness, addressing themes of coming of age and outgrowing his hometown. The album was promoted by four singles and a tour across North America and Europe. It received generally favorable reviews from critics, who enjoyed Glaive's ability to successfully express youthful emotions, although some considered it a downgrade when compared to his previous work and felt negative about his departure from hyperpop.

== Background ==
At the start of the COVID-19 pandemic, Glaive began recording music in his bedroom. His music was described as hyperpop at the beginning of his career, although he did not associate himself with the label, describing his music as "straight-up pop songs" with "nothing hyper about them". In 2020, Glaive signed to Interscope Records and released two solo EPs, Cypress Grove (2020) and All Dogs Go to Heaven (2021), a deluxe EP, Old Dog, New Tricks (2022), and one collaborative EP, Then I'll Be Happy (2021) with Ericdoa. During 2022, Glaive collaborated with high-profile musicians like Travis Barker and Machine Gun Kelly and was a supporting act for the Kid Laroi's The End of the World Tour. The non-album singles "Minnesota Is a Place That Exists" and "Three Wheels and It Still Drives!" (both 2022) were originally intended for I Care So Much That I Don't Care at All. Prior to the album's release, Glaive came out as bisexual.

== Development ==
I Care So Much That I Don't Care at All was recorded in a windowless garage in Los Angeles. Glaive enlisted returning collaborators Jeff Hazin and Ralph Castelli to produce the album. Other producers that contributed to the album include Alexander 23, Underscores, Rodaidh McDonald, Nick Ferraro, Michael Pollack, and the Monsters & Strangerz. The first track that he recorded was the album's opener "Oh Are You Bipolar One or Two?" after he had just turned age 17. The tracks "All I Do Is Try My Best" and "I Care So Much That I Don't Care at All" were recorded when he had just turned age 18. The track "As If" was made in December 2022, after the rest of the album had already been completed.

In an interview with Vulture, Glaive stated that although he does not come into producing music with a set idea in mind, the music he listens to at the time "subconsciously, or maybe even consciously, [...] [dictates]" his direction; at the start of recording, he became interested in emo bands such as Brand New and Modern Baseball. He also cited the 1975, Bon Iver, ABBA, and Mura Masa as influences on the album. After making around 80 songs, Glaive started to run out of ideas to write about. This led him to start writing introspective and self-critical lyrics instead of focusing on what was happening around him. During both writing and recording, Glaive talked with Hazin about what his fans might think about his departure from hyperpop. They both decided that the people who did not like his change in style "didn't necessarily like him" and instead only "liked the algorithm thing that they were presented with". While Glaive understands people calling the album "a big sonic departure", he believed it's the same idea as his previous work: "It’s energetic and there's vocal layers; it does hit the same points." He only made electronic music because that was the only way he knew how to make music. Since he had the opportunity to make music with people who could play the guitar and drums, he started making music with those instruments.

== Composition ==
=== Overview ===
I Care So Much That I Don't Care at All marked a transition in Glaive's sound, (Note: Attributed to multiple references:) moving away from hyperpop to a sound that is primarily based in emo, pop, and rock music. Colin Joyce of Pitchfork wrote that the album is the first time that Glaive sounds comfortable making less "hyper" pop songs. Writing for NME, Ali Shutler said that the album "is a world away from the technicolour rave that’s defined hyper-pop". Matthew Kim of The Line of Best Fit wrote that Glaive "fully transitions away from frenzied trap beats and toward verse-chorus-verse emo-pop." Vulture's Justin Curto described the album's sound as " '90s and '00s emo heard through a much more contemporary ear." Other critics described the album as indie pop, pop-punk, and pop-rock.

The album represents themes of coming of age and outgrowing his hometown, shifting between desperation and hopefulness. According to Steve Erickson of Slant Magazine, its lyrics revolve around suicide, fentanyl, and "general teenage alienation". Erickson described Glaive's voice as "mumble rap-inspired". Shutler wrote that the album "sees him slowing things down and reflecting on his hectic journey so far." Flood Magazine's Will Schube wrote that the album "builds from the early tenets of hyperpop but moves toward rock, rap, electro, and beyond" and called Glaive's lyricism "as personal as ever". Martyn Young of Dork said that the record shows Glaive "Trying to navigate growing up and finding his way in the world" and "highlights how far he's come and the sonic evolution of his music." Joyce said the album showcases the high and lows of being young. Rishi Shah of Clash wrote that the album is a "journey of self-discovery" and sees Glaive "explore the shroud of suburbia, edging to move on from his hometown, working through the doubts life throws at him without losing sight of the bigger picture".

=== Songs ===
"The Car"
"The Car" has been cited as the furthest Glaive has gone into a pop sound. Its lyrics revolve around a story of an adolescent love triangle.

I Care So Much That I Don't Care at All's opening track is "Oh Are You Bipolar One or Two?", a track about suicidal ideation, self-hatred, and Glaive's experience of anxiety during his rise to fame. The track begins with a soft piano and transitions into "stadium-sized" drums. The pop-punk "As If" begins with a sample of Timothée Chalamet's monologue in the off-Broadway play Prodigal Son (2016). Its lyrics discuss homophobia and fentanyl addiction, and shows Glaive being "defiant and refusing to change." The track is about trying to move on from old friends but still finding it hard to detach from them. A pop-punk track, "17250" drew comparisons to Machine Gun Kelly and contains a "massive, singalong arena chorus" according to Kim, while Shutler said it "wrestles with heartbreak". "Pardee Urgent Care" is an indie folk track that "looks at a toxic relationship through a rose-tinted lens" and finishes with a guitar solo. Elle Barton of DIY called it "a definitive phone-torches-in-the-air moment." "The Car" is written from the perspective of Glaive's friend who was cheated on. It tells a story of an adolescent love triangle atop fuzzy and feedback-heavy guitars. Shutler called it "the most pop Glaive has ever gone" and described the track as "the 1975 meets Harry Styles". Joyce said the track "recalls several decades' worth of guitar-led pop" and compared it to Ric Ocasek and Third Eye Blind.

The album's interlude, "I Care So Much That I Don't Care at All", is self-reflective, shows gratitude, and displays a newfound desire to live life. The track is built on a droning synthesizer and an acoustic guitar riff. "All I Do Is Try My Best", a soft rock and folk-pop song which drew comparisons to the Lumineers, describes the confusions of growing into adulthood. A track about self-acceptance, Glaive contemplates suicide due to learning how much money is owed on his taxes. Glaive has called it the most hopeful song he has made. The upbeat "I'm Nothing That's All I Am" recalls a breakup. According to Joyce, "The Prom" contains "sugar-rushing harmonies" and shows Glaive's knowledge of pop music's "toolkit". "Tiziana" sees Glaive criticizing an ex-partner about betraying him. Shutler described "I've Made Worse Mistakes" as "posi-pop". The penultimate track, the pop-punk "The Good The Bad The Olga", celebrates having nothing left to lose and "begs for a cathartic moshpit [sic]". Kim described the sound collage closing track "2005 Barbie Doll" as the strangest song in Glaive's discography and called it "weirdly compelling."

== Promotion and release ==
Glaive announced I Care So Much That I Don't Care at All alongside the release of the lead single "As If" on April 28, 2023. The album's release date and cover was officially announced alongside the release of the second single, "I'm Nothing That's All I Am", on May 17. The album cover was photographed in Latvia. It was followed by the third single, "All I Do Is Try My Best", on June 7. The fourth and final single, "The Car", was released on June 30. With the exception of "I'm Nothing That's All I Am", each single was accompanied by a music video shot in Tbilisi, Georgia and directed by Adrian Vilagomez as a part of a trilogy. The album was released via Interscope Records on July 14, 2023.

Glaive embarked on a tour of North America with Origami Angel, Oso Oso, and Polo Perks to support the album. It was his first tour with a live band. The tour began in San Francisco on July 29, and concluded in Detroit on August 19, 2023. From November 11 to November 21, 2023, he embarked on his first-ever tour of the United Kingdom and Europe.

== Critical reception ==
Professional ratings
Aggregate scores
Source	Rating
Metacritic	73/100
Review scores
Source	Rating
Clash	9/10
DIY	4/5 stars
Dork	4/5 stars
The Line of Best Fit	6/10
NME	4/5 stars
Pitchfork	6.7/10
Slant Magazine	2.5/5 stars

At Metacritic, which assigns a normalized rating out of 100 to reviews from professional publications, I Care So Much That I Don't Care at All received a score of 73, based on six reviews, indicating "generally favorable" reviews. Critics enjoyed Glaive's ability to successfully express youthful emotions, but some considered it a downgrade when compared to his previous work and felt negative about his departure from hyperpop.

For Clash, Rishi Shah wrote that the album "cements [Glaive's] status as a big game player" and that "there's a hyperpop throne with his name on it." DIY's Elle Barton said that "while the emotions are big, the choruses are even bigger". Writing for Dork, Martyn Young said that the album "highlights how far he's come and the sonic evolution of his music" and Glaive "[brims] with confidence and an innate bratty exuberance". In a review for NME, Ali Shutler wrote that "Glaive isn’t done breaking new ground" and called the album "a modern take on bratty emo" and "complex." Colin Joyce of Pitchfork wrote that, at the album's best, it "captures the ecstatic, uncomfortable intensity of the joy and turmoil of being young", but felt some moments were naïve or overly simplistic.

Some critics were less enthusiastic. In a lukewarm review for The Line of Best Fit, Matthew Kim praised Glaive's ability to "express the tensions of Gen Z existence in musical form" and wrote that while Glaive still has the potential to make something great, the album does not match the creativity of his previous releases. He described the album's production as "borderline-corporate" when compared to the "homegrown sound of his EPs". Steve Erickson of Slant Magazine wrote that Glaive's voice is "limited in range and quality" and that "most of its songs sound as if they could have been released in the 2000s." He further commented that "the album struggles to retain the intimacy of his earlier releases as it delivers a more palatable sound" and felt negative about his shift into a more emo direction. He also called certain tracks on the album generic.

== Track listing ==
I Care So Much That I Don't Care at All track listing
No.	Title	Writer(s)	Producer(s)	Length
1.	"Oh Are You Bipolar One or Two?"	Ash Gutierrez; Jeff Hazin; Rodaidh McDonald	Hazin; McDonald	3:26
2.	"As If"	Gutierrez; Hazin; Ralph Castelli	Hazin; Castelli	3:11
3.	"17250"	Gutierrez; Hazin; Castelli; April Harper Grey	Hazin; Castelli; Underscores	2:31
4.	"Pardee Urgent Care"	Gutierrez; Hazin; Alexander Glantz	Hazin; Alexander 23	2:19
5.	"The Car"	Gutierrez; Hazin; Castelli	Hazin; Castelli	2:59
6.	"I Care So Much That I Don't Care at All"	Gutierrez; Hazin; Castelli	Hazin; Castelli	2:04
7.	"All I Do Is Try My Best"	Gutierrez; Hazin; Castelli	Hazin; Castelli	2:49
8.	"I'm Nothing That's All I Am"	Gutierrez; Hazin	Hazin	2:57
9.	"The Prom"	Gutierrez; Hazin; Castelli; Nick Ferraro	Hazin; Castelli; Ferraro	2:11
10.	"Tiziana"	Gutierrez; Hazin; Stefan Johnson; Jordan Johnson; Michael Pollack	Hazin; Pollack; The Monsters & Strangerz	3:13
11.	"I've Made Worse Mistakes"	Gutierrez; Hazin; Castelli	Hazin; Castelli	2:30
12.	"The Good the Bad the Olga"	Gutierrez; Hazin	Hazin	2:15
13.	"2005 Barbie Doll"	Gutierrez; Hazin; Ferraro	Hazin; Ferraro	3:09
Total length:				35:34

Notes

- All tracks are stylized in lowercase, and with the exception of "Oh Are You Bipolar One or Two?", without punctuation.

== Personnel ==
Credits adapted from Tidal.

Musicians

- Glaive – vocals
- Jeff Hazin – drum programming (tracks 1–5, 7–12), guitar (1–3, 5, 6, 8–13), bass guitar (1–3, 8, 10, 12), synthesizer (4–11, 13), keyboards (10), vocals (13)
- Rodaidh McDonald – guitar, piano (1)
- Ralph Castelli – bass guitar (2, 3, 5–7, 9, 11), electric guitar (2, 3, 5, 7, 9, 11), drums (2, 3, 5, 11), acoustic guitar (2, 3, 7), synthesizer (2, 5–7, 11), background vocals (7)
- Underscores – drum programming (3)
- Alexander 23 – background vocals, bass guitar, drum programming, guitar, synthesizer (4)
- Nick Ferraro – background vocals (9), guitar (13), bass guitar (13)

Technical

- Randy Merrill – mastering
- Mitch McCarthy – mixing
- Ash Gutierrez – engineering
- Jeff Hazin – engineering
- Ralph Castelli – engineering (5)

== Release history ==
Release dates and format(s) for I Care So Much That I Don't Care at All
Region	Date	Format(s)	Label	Ref.
Various	July 14, 2023	Digital download; streaming; LP; CD	Interscope	
