= Things with Wings =

2022 studio album by Ericdoa

Studio album by Ericdoa
- Released: May 20, 2022
- Recorded: 2020–2021
- Genre: Pop rap; hyperpop
- Length: 34:39
- Label: Listen to the Kids; Interscope
- Producer: Ericdoa; Glasear; Fortune Swan; Zetra; mochila; grandma; Daniel Hartzog; Andrew Luce; kimj; Travis Barker; umru; 1Chai; Will Catucci; 48th St; Y2K; Distance Decay

Ericdoa chronology
Then I'll Be Happy (2021)	Things with Wings (2022)	DOA (2024)

Singles from Things with Wings
- 1. "Fool4love" Released: February 22, 2022; 2. "Lifeline" Released: April 7, 2022; 3. "Victim" Released: May 23, 2022

Things with Wings is the second studio album by American musician Ericdoa, released on May 20, 2022, by Listen to the Kids and Interscope Records. It is a pop rap and hyperpop album, with elements of many other genres. It follows his debut album COA and is his first major project after signing to Interscope in 2021.

== Background and recording ==
In 2021, Ericdoa signed to Interscope Records and released a collaborative EP with Glaive, Then I'll Be Happy. He spent a year and a half working on Things with Wings.

== Production and composition ==
The album opens and closes with spoken word songs, "Stuck - Intro" and "Commander Dr - Dear Mama", respectively. Travis Barker contributes drums to the song "Cheap Liquor", which has elements of grunge. In "Phases", Ercidoa pulls elements from city pop for the song's bassline. "Victim" is a new wave-influenced track that begins with an acoustic riff before dropping into pop production. In "Fool4love", withdrawal is used as an analogy for heartbreak.

== Release and promotion ==
Things with Wings was released on May 20, 2022. It was preceded by two singles, "Fool4love", released on February 22, and "Lifeline", released on April 7. The latter single was accompanied by an 8-bit video game. He later released the song "Victim" as a single following the album's release. In promotion of the album, Ericdoa went on his first headlining North American tour, which ran from April to May.

== Track listing ==
Things with Wings track listing
No.	Title	Writer(s)	Producer(s)	Length
1.	"Stuck - Intro"	Eric Lopez	Ericdoa	0:53
2.	"OCD"	Lopez; Alain Cartaya; Liam Mangrini; Ricardo Rodriquez; John Ong	Glasear; Fortune Swan; Zetra; mochila; Ericdoa	2:08
3.	"Lifeline"	Lopez; Liam Hall; Cartaya; Ong; Mangrini; Daniel Hartzog	Ericdoa; grandma; mochila; Glasear; Zetra; Daniel Hartzog	2:45
4.	"Cheap Liquor"	Lopez; Rodriquez; Andrew Luce; Jaehyun Kim; Ong; Travis Barker	Ericdoa; Fortune Swan; Andrew Luce; kimj; Glasear; Travis Barker	1:48
5.	"Broke My Car Radio"	Ong; Rodriquez; Kim; Mangrini; Cartaya; Lopez	Glasear; Fortune Swan; kimj; Zetra; mochila; Ericdoa	2:03
6.	"Phases"	Mangrini; Cartaya; Rodriquez; Lopez	Zetra; mochila; Fortune Swan; Ericdoa	2:35
7.	"Night That We Danced"	Lopez; Rodriquez; Kim; Ong	Ericdoa; Fortune Swan; kimj; Glasear	2:50
8.	"Primadonna"	Jaan Rothenberg; Rodriquez; Lopez	umru; Fortune Swan; Ericdoa	2:03
9.	"Hey There Nice to Meet Ya"	Ong; Mangrini; Kai Amuan; Cartaya; Will Catucci; Lopez	Glasear; Zetra; 1Chai; mochila; Will Catucci; Ericdoa	2:02
10.	"Haven"	Mangrini; Ong; Zack Webster; Lopez	Zetra; Glasear; 48th St; Ericdoa	2:25
11.	"Victim"	Cartaya; Ari Starace; Kim; Ong; Rodriquez; Mangrini; Lopez	mochila; Y2K; kimj; Glasear; Fortune Swan; Zetra; Ericdoa	2:55
12.	"Fool4love"	Lopez; Rodriquez; Derek Mondock; Mangrini; Ong; Cartaya	Ericdoa; Fortune Swan; Distance Decay; Zetra; Glasear; mochila	2:08
13.	"First Day of Summer"	Mangrini; Cartaya; Rodriquez; Lopez	Fortune Swan; mochila; Zetra; Ericdoa	1:59
14.	"Attention Whore"	Rodriquez; Lopez	Ericdoa; Fortune Swan	2:33
15.	"Commander Dr - Dear Mama"	Lopez	Ericdoa	3:26
Total length:				34:39

- All tracks are stylized in all lowercase.
