= Kurtains =

Welsh singer-songwriter (born 2003)

- Born: December 20, 2003 (age 22); Llanelli, Wales
- Genre: Hyperpop
- Occupations: Musician; record producer
- Years active: 2020–present
- Member of: slowsilver03

Alex Davies (born December 20, 2003), also known as Kurtains (stylized in all lowercase), is a Welsh singer-songwriter and record producer. He is a member of the collective slowsilver03, alongside other members such as quinn, Wido and glaive. He began releasing music in 2020, following the COVID-19 pandemic. He released the album God Save The Three with Glaive in 2026.

== Musical style ==
In his "The Lost Promises of Hyperpoptimism" article, Kieran Press-Reynolds at Pitchfork had felt that Kurtains "erupted" into multiple "giddy stutters" in his song "Rain", which Reynolds had compared to the likes of K.K. Slider from Animal Crossing." While Jacob Saltzberg at Earmilk felt he had an "ethereal", "genre-bending, and "expansive" sound. Kurtains' music has been described as alt-rock, hyperpop, trap, R&B, and hip-hop.
