= Bennie Gutierrez =

American polo player (1935–2024)

- Born: Benito T. Gutierrez; October 29 1935; San Antonio, Texas, U.S.
- Died: July 25, 2024 (aged 88); Sebring, Florida, U.S.
- Spouse: Kay Gutierrez
- Children: Mark Gutierrez, Julie Collins
- Relatives: Ash Gutierrez (grandson)

Benito T. Gutierrez (October 1935 – July 25, 2024) was an American professional polo player. He was inducted into the Museum of Polo and Hall of Fame in 2003. The Polo Ralph Lauren logo is based on an image of Gutierrez.

== Biography ==
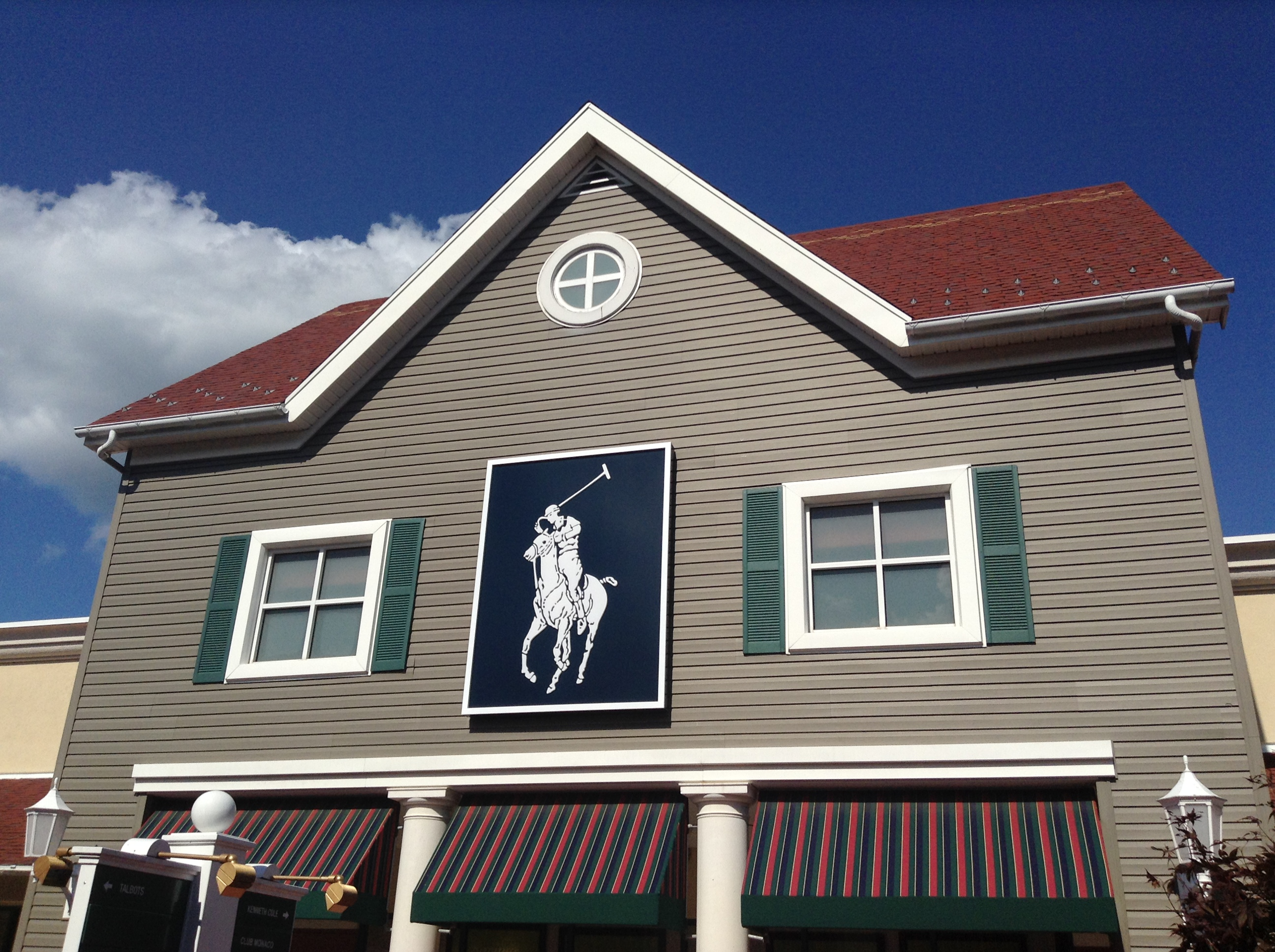
A Polo Ralph Lauren store in Clinton, Connecticut, featuring the logo based on an image of Gutierrez.

Benito T. Gutierrez was born in October 1935 in San Antonio, Texas. He started playing polo after being taught by his father, who worked for polo families.

He was one of the highest rated polo players during the 1960s and 1970s. He reached an 8-goal handicap in 1968, before there were any American 10-goal players. He suffered a serious injury at Boca Raton's Royal Palm Polo Club, which ended up with him retiring from professional polo shortly after. After retiring, he continued to train polo ponies and managed high-goal polo teams.

The Polo Ralph Lauren logo is based on an image taken from a video shot in Connecticut of Gutierrez. Throughout his life, he received royalties for the image.

He won the 1972 U.S. Open Polo Championship, the 1960 and 1967 National Twenty Goal, and the 1969 and 1971 National Sixteen Goal. He was also chosen as one of the USA team's best to play in the 1969 Cup of the Americas in Argentina.

He helped in organizing the professional umpiring program in its early days and served as the USPA's first head umpire. He was honored with the Carlton Beal Umpire Award in 1993. He was inducted into the Museum of Polo and Hall of Fame in 2003.

He died on July 25, 2024, in Sebring, Florida.

His son, Mark, is a former professional polo player, his grandson Ash Blue Gutierrez, is a singer-songwriter with stage name Glaive. Glaive's 3rd album, Y'all, includes the track "Bennie & Kay" commemorating Bennie and his wife Kay, with a sample from Bennie's induction to the Museum of Polo and Hall of Fame playing at the end.
