= Drive-By Lullabies =

Studio album by Quinn
- Released: September 17, 2021
- Genre: Experimental pop; digicore
- Length: 34:31
- Label: Dismiss Yourself
- Producer: Quinn

Quinn chronology
Bleh (2020)	Drive-By Lullabies (2021)	Beat Tape No.1 (2021)

Singles from Drive-By Lullabies
- 1. "Coping Mechanism" Released: May 19, 2021

Drive-By Lullabies is the debut studio album by the American musician Quinn, released on September 17, 2021, by Dismiss Yourself. Recouping from a period of depression after purging her songs on SoundCloud, Quinn began producing the album herself. She had the goal of making the album sound messy and viewed the album as a trial run. She altered her vocals in various different ways, including raising the pitch of her vocals on the album to hide her deeper voice. She incorporated field recordings that she recorded herself into the album's sound.

Drive-By Lullabies is an experimental pop and digicore album, departing from Quinn's previous hyperpop sound. Music journalists also described the album as drawing from a wide range of genres. It explores themes of depression and suicidal ideation with songs written about Quinn's experiences in real life. "Coping Mechanism" was released as the album's lead single in May 2021. The album received critical acclaim; Dazed and The Fader considered it one of the best albums of 2021, while The Line of Best Fit deemed it one of the best hyperpop albums of all time.

== Background and production ==
The American musician and record producer Quinn started releasing hyperpop music in late 2019. She became a pioneer of the genre and gained a cult following after her singles gained attention. Specifically, her 2019 single "I Don't Want That Many Friends in the First Place" gained popularity in 2020 on social media platforms such as TikTok and YouTube; around the same time, The Fader labelled her "hyperpop's once and future queen". She first hinted at a debut album in July 2020, stating that there would be "lots of big names listed as features". In March 2021, she removed all hyperpop songs from her SoundCloud page, stopped doing collaborations, and deactivated her Twitter account. Following this, she revealed she had gone through a period of severe depression and began creating video game-influenced ambient, drum and bass, and jungle music without vocals or lyrics under the aliases Cat Mother and Trench Dog. In an interview with Business Insider, she stated that she no longer wanted to cater to her fans and preferred to "make silly little songs" in her bedroom.

Quinn produced the entirety of Drive-By Lullabies herself. Being a trans woman, she raised the pitch of her vocals on nearly every track of the album; she describes her voice as being deep, stating, "I'm sure you don't want to hear fucking Morgan Freeman sing to you about dysphoria". She also altered her voice in different ways on numerous tracks. Quinn has described Drive-By Lullabies as a "test run", and had a goal of making it sound "messy". She sampled sound recordings she took months prior to the album's release, such as a dripping faucet, birds chirping, buzzing insects, and vehicles driving by. Its title was inspired by the album's "chaotic mixture of harsh and soft noises"; Quinn commented, "You got a combination, a beautiful disaster". The album's interlude was freestyled and recorded in 2018. The album cover is a photograph of Quinn's face hidden behind a Pioneer DJ controller; Mano Sundaresan of Pitchfork felt the artwork reflects the album's sequencing. Samuel Hyland for Office Magazine wrote that the cover "quickly became an image seared into the brains of longtime listeners, and soon-to-be fans alike".

== Composition ==
=== Overview ===
Drive-By Lullabies is an experimental pop and digicore album with elements of dark ambient and drum and bass. Some music journalists felt it had departed from Quinn's previous hyperpop sound. Press-Reynolds wrote that it can range from industrial bass, to glitch-rap, to noise pop; retrospectively, he considered it as a combination of twee pop, ambient, and glitch-rap containing "facemelting" bass. The Fader's Jordan Darville highlighted its "progressive rave composition", while Sundaresan thought its sound design "reveals new layers with every listen". He also mentioned the album's "terminally online" feel, as if a teenager was switching between tabs and Internet rabbit holes. Noah Simon for The Line of Best Fit called the album "an eclectic smorgasbord of ideas", highlighting its mix of acoustic, experimental indie folk, lofi hip-hop reminiscent of the rapper Mike, to pop music atop 2-step drum patterns.

The lyrics of Drive-By Lullabies indulge in themes of depression and suicidal ideation and were written about Quinn's real-life experiences. Several songs are about her personal anxieties, such as dealing with enemies online and her constant fear of the end of the world. Ambient passages and found sound connect the album's verses, making the album's genre exploration blend. Sundaresan called the album a "portrait of a small celebrity navigating personal life". Dazed's Günseli Yalcinkaya highlighted the album's "anxious" atmosphere, intense guitar riffs, and chaotic noise. Sundaresan compared some songs to Quinn's 2019 song "MBN", while others lean in the vein of dark ambient and drum and bass. He also described the album as having a mixtape-like feel.

=== Songs ===
"Coping Mechanism"
"Coping Mechanism" displays Quinn's altered vocals shown throughout Drive-By Lullabies, also containing a "hilariously morbid" and "calm" refrain.

The opening track of Drive-By Lullabies is "The Word Is Ending Soon!", which contains lyrics about isolation and depression and showcases Quinn's voice emerging from a mix of guitars and static. The following track, "From Paris, with Love", draws back to Quinn's hyperpop and digicore roots. It begins with dark synthesizers and trap drums with electronic dance music noise in its second half. It concludes with a noisy techno instrumental. "Can You Really Blame Me for How I React?" is followed by "Coping Mechanism", a track with crushed vocals atop glitches and birdsong. Its refrain was called both "hilariously morbid" and "calm" by Sundaresan: "Have you seen enough people die? I didn't think so". "Birthday Girl" is an instrumental song containing a sample of a man screaming at another person atop a piano. At points, the other person will yell back with a frightened voice; the song finishes with a sample of a physician speaking on depression. The track was written about the time Quinn ran away from her house after arguing with her parents on her 16th birthday. Yannick Gölz for laut.de said it can deeply hit "you in the gut" (Note: This quote is a translation of the original text: "in die Magengrube haut") and described it as the "song equivalent of a picture speaks louder than many words". (Note: This quote is a translation of the original text: "Song-Äquivalent von einem Bild, das mehr als viele Worte sagt.")

On "Silly", Quinn combines multiple vocal layers with a piano arpeggio, creating an emotional effect. Sundaresan described it as a mixture of the soft music from JRPGs and 2021 digicore releases such as Jane Remover's Teen Week or Kurtains's Insignia's Manor. "Perfect Imperfection" also calls back to Quinn's hyperpop origin; it incorporates a drill rhythm ahead of a synthesizer noise wall. The lyrics of "Mallgrabber P" express complicated emotions between two people using "endearing" verses. "12/25/18" presents a lo-fi, Southern rap freestyle over the beat of Schoolboy Q's 2012 track "Hands on the Wheel"; Sundaresan described it as "a kid's earnest take on Some Rap Songs". A ballad with glitch influence, "Change That" presents Quinn singing "See I want something to do with you" to a love interest. It marks the beginning of a three-song sequence that concludes the album's relationship narrative. "It Molds Where It Doesn't Dry Correctly" presents Quinn experimenting with lo-fi guitar melodies. "School Days" is a stripped-back emo-trap song that employs an acoustic guitar into its finishing "recorded lullaby", (Note: This quote is a translation of the original text: "aufgenommenes Schlaflied") as described by Gölz. It is followed by the penultimate track, "And Now a Word from Our Sponors!". The album concludes with "I'm Here for a Good Time, Not a Long Time", a track with breaks that fragment the song's lines.

== Release and reception ==
Professional ratings
Review scores
Source	Rating
laut.de	4/5 stars
Pitchfork	7.7/10

"Coping Mechanism" was released as the lead single from Drive-By Lullabies on May 19, 2021. The album was released on September 17, by Dismiss Yourself. It was released to critical acclaim, according to Darville. Pitchfork gave it a positive review upon its release; Sundaresan complimented its genre blending and emotional depth. He felt the "emotional core" of the album connects its multiple different aspects; however, he thought it had too many moving parts for a debut album. Gölz reviewed the album positively for laut.de; he said its do it yourself (DIY) and "amateurish" (Note: This quote is a translation of the original text: "amateurhafter") feel created a "unique soundscape". (Note: This quote is a translation of the original text: "einzigartige Klangkulisse") He called the album a "devastating listen" (Note: This quote is a translation of the original text: "verheerendes Hören") and thought its sample flips were ahead of its time. Darville called it a "restless and wildly engaging collection of songs". Dazed considered Drive-By Lullabies the 18th best album of 2021; Yalcinkaya lauded Quinn's production abilities. The Fader ranked it the year's 23rd best album; Darville said "it wasn't the record [Quinn] promised; it was something better" and felt she succeeded at trying a new sound. In October 2021, the staff at laut.de deemed "From Paris, with Love" the 12th best hyperpop song of all time. Gölz wrote that it "doesn't fully reflect the breadth" (Note: This quote is a translation of the original text: "nicht die ganze Breite ") of Drive-By Lullabies and its techno ending "feels more inviting and intuitive than most of the other songs". (Note: This quote is a translation of the original text: "einladender und intuitiver als die meisten anderen Songs anmutet") In 2022, The Line of Best Fit deemed Drive-By Lullabies the 15th best hyperpop album of all time. Simon said it "completely shattered expectations of what her debut album would sound like", with particular praise for its "mature" songwriting. In an interview with The Fader, Quinn said the album made people take her seriously as an artist and began to rate her critically.

== Track listing ==
All tracks are written and produced by Quinn.

Drive-By Lullabies track listing
No.	Title	Length
1.	"The World Is Ending Soon!"	1:46
2.	"From Paris, with Love"	3:02
3.	"Can You Really Blame Me for How I React?"	3:31
4.	"Coping Mechanism"	1:43
5.	"Birthday Girl"	4:30
6.	"Silly"	2:38
7.	"Perfect Imperfection"	2:44
8.	"Mallgrabber P"	2:09
9.	"12/25/18"	2:18
10.	"Change That"	2:32
11.	"It Molds Where It Doesn't Dry Correctly"	1:35
12.	"School Days"	3:36
13.	"And Now a Word from Our Sponsors!"	0:56
14.	"I'm Here for a Good Time, Not a Long Time"	1:31
Total length:		34:31

== Personnel ==
Credits are adapted from Bandcamp and the liner notes of Drive-By Lullabies.

- Quinn – music, cover art
- Moa – mastering
- Mal – cassette, CD
- Sticki – cassette, CD
- Ambient Bird – artwork, cassette, CD
- Fooyepont – artwork, cassette, CD
- Ichgo – CD

== Release history ==
Release dates and format(s) for Drive-By Lullabies
Region	Date	Format(s)	Label	Edition	Ref.
Worldwide	September 17, 2021	Streaming; digital download; cassette; CD	Dismiss Yourself	Standard	
Worldwide	August 15, 2022	Streaming; digital download	DeadAir	Remastered	
Worldwide	June 17, 2024	LP	Dismiss Yourself	Standard	
