= I Wanna Slam My Head Against the Wall =

Single by Glaive

from the EP All Dogs Go to Heaven
- Released: March 17, 2021
- Studio: Studio in Los Angeles
- Genre: Hyperpop
- Length: 1:56
- Label: Interscope
- Songwriters: Ash Gutierrez; Cashheart; Kidicarus; Jaehyun Kim; John Ong; Ethan Snoreck
- Producers: Cashheart; Glasear; Kidicarus; Kimj; Whethan

Glaive singles chronology
"Cloak n Dagger" (2021)	"I Wanna Slam My Head Against the Wall" (2021)	"What Was the Last Thing U Said" (2021)

Music video
- "I Wanna Slam My Head Against the Wall" on YouTube

"I Wanna Slam My Head Against the Wall" is a song by the American musician Glaive from his second extended play (EP), All Dogs Go to Heaven (2021). It was released by Interscope Records on March 17, 2021, as the EP's lead single. Inspired by online school and quarantine, Glaive wrote the song with its producers and engineers, Cashheart, Glasear, Kidicarus, Kimj, and Whethan. Glaive recorded it himself in a Los Angeles studio as Prash 'Engine-Earz' Mistry handled the song's mixing and mastering.

A hyperpop song, "I Wanna Slam My Head Against the Wall" is driven by an acoustic guitar that develops into a synthesizer-heavy glitch and dance drop during the song's chorus. Its lyrics discuss declining serotonin levels, Glaive's alcohol-infatuated love interest, and self-harm. Its chorus increases in pace as it is sung. The song received positive reviews upon its release; several publications included it in their year-end lists of the best songs of 2021. A music video directed by Steve Cannon premiered alongside the song's release and depicts Glaive singing in a house and neighborhood.

== Background and release ==
Glaive released his debut extended play (EP), Cypress Grove, in November 2020. It gained him a global fanbase and received widespread critical acclaim. While he recorded Cypress Grove in his North Carolina bedroom, he travelled to Los Angeles to record his next EP in a studio across a two-week period. He announced his second EP, titled All Dogs Go to Heaven, on March 17, 2021, alongside the release of "I Wanna Slam My Head Against the Wall" as its lead single. It appears as the sixth track on the EP, which was released by Interscope Records on August 6, 2021.

== Production and composition ==
Glaive wrote "I Wanna Slam My Head Against the Wall" alongside its producers and engineers, Cashheart, Glasear, Kidicarus, Kimj, and Whethan. It was recorded by Glaive in a Los Angeles studio; Prash 'Engine-Earz' Mistry handled the song's mixing and mastering. Glaive said the inspiration behind the track was online school and quarantine.

"I Wanna Slam My Head Against the Wall" is 1 minute and 56 seconds long. It is a hyperpop song that opens with an acoustic guitar supported by shakers and a flute. The song then transitions to frenetic and trap-heavy maximalist hyperpop production. 808 drums build into the song's chorus using a synthesizer-heavy glitch and dance drop. In one of the song's standard pop moments, Glaive is backed by an acoustic guitar, singing, "I need you bad, you know it". The song concludes with a plucking acoustic guitar. Jon Caramanica from The New York Times called the instrumental "squirrelly", while Eileen Cartter of GQ described it as a "thumping arcade beat". Jeff Ihaza for Rolling Stone observed the "sugary-sweet electronics of modern pop music" used in the song and attributed it to the music of Sophie. He also described the drums as "shak[ing] like a game controller, somehow visceral, digital, and tangible all in one". The Line of Best Fit's Sophie Leigh Walker said the track sees Glaive "flipping his emo-indebted, glitched out pop signature for a smoother ride".

The lyrics of "I Wanna Slam My Head Against the Wall" find Glaive singing about declining serotonin levels, his alcohol-infatuated love interest, and self-harm. His vocals are mutated and he raps the line "I'm on the brink of insanity inside my own home" in a "warbled mumble", according to Ihaza. The chorus increases in pace as it is sung; this effect was likened to a merry-go-round by Walker. She also said the song is "all sunshine and rainbows on the surface" and conceals "universal angst". Julia Gray of Pitchfork described the song as "deceptively chipper" and said it contains "radio-friendly lyrics". Caramanica said the song "tilts between breathability and gasping" and called the lyrics "sweetly sung agony", while the Los Angeles Times' Mikael Wood wrote that the song's grooves switch between "la-di-da and go-go-go".

== Critical reception ==
Upon its release, "I Wanna Slam My Head Against the Wall" received positive reviews from music critics. Rolling Stone selected it as a "Song You Need to Know"; Ihaza said the song's title "couldn't be a better description of the way things [felt in 2021]" and called the song a "crossover moment for Glaive and his hyperpop contemporaries". NME named it a key track from All Dogs Go to Heaven, while Shaad D'Souza from Paper called the song's structure more complicated than Glaive's previously released songs, but wrote "that's no issue when the song is this addictive". The Times considered it one of the "Hottest tracks" of its release week; Dan Cairns called the song "a teen stompathon that sounds like a monster hit".

"I Wanna Slam My Head Against the Wall" was included in several critical lists of the best songs of 2021. For The New York Times, Caramanica named it the best song of the year; he called it an "evolutionary leap" for Glaive and said it finds "the middle ground between the [hyperpop] scene's mayhem and the sweetness of pop". The Los Angeles Times considered it the 27th best song of the year, with Wood writing the track showcases Glaive "vent[ing] his various frustrations". Slate included it in an unranked list; Carl Wilson called it a "hit inside the hyperpop hive".

== Music video ==
Steve Cannon directed the music video for "I Wanna Slam My Head Against the Wall", which premiered on the same day as the song's release. The video starts with Glaive leaving a house after getting an upsetting text. He smiles and waves to the camera and showcases his painted nails. The video also depicts Glaive walking around the house and neighborhood while singing; some of the lip-syncing does not align with the music. At times, his silhouette is shown against a background resembling a lava lamp. A YouTube commenter mentioned that Glaive appears happy while singing about self-harm.
