= DOA (mixtape) =

Studio album by Ericdoa
- Released: January 19, 2024
- Genres: Hyperpop; pop; trap; emo
- Length: 23:15
- Labels: Listen to the Kids; Interscope
- Producers: Camoufly; Distance Deceay; Dœgægé; Ericdoa; Glasear; Sophie Gray; Malik Ninety Five; Mochila; Morris; Noah Breakfast; Aaron Shadrow; Synthetic; Gray Toomey; Two Inch Punch; Venny; Zetra

Ericdoa chronology
Things with Wings (2022)	DOA (2024)	Why Suffer For Us? (2024)

Singles from DOA
- 1. "Kickstand" Released: September 22, 2023; 2. "Dancinwithsomebawdy" Released: November 3, 2023; 3. "Sweet Tooth" Released: December 15, 2023

DOA is the third studio album by American musician Ericdoa. It was released on January 19, 2024, through Interscope Records and Listen to the Kids. Production was handled by multiple record producers including Noah Breakfast, Venny and Two Inch Punch. DOA was supported by three singles—"Kickstand", "Dancinwithsomebawdy", and "Sweet Tooth"—alongside the Dead on Arrival Tour.

== Background and recording ==
The album's aesthetic was inspired by Puerto Rican culture, specifically the Young Lords. Ericdoa was also inspired by the music of artists including Lady Gaga, Charli XCX, and Willie Colón. The album's cover artwork was inspired by a woman selling clothing that he met in Bushwick, Brooklyn who "embodied the selfless maternal spirit" of Latin women. When recording Lopez had the goal of making music that makes him happy. Ericdoa would later livestream a two hour long freestyle.

== Release and promotion ==
On March 4, 2023, Ericdoa released a single in collaboration with Riot Games, ">One - Greater Than One", a theme for the first-person tactical hero shooter Valorant. On September 22, 2023, the album's lead single, "Kickstand", was released, alongside a music video. Ericdoa had announced the "Dead on Arrival Tour" with singer Bixby in support of the album. The tour began on January 25, 2024 in San Diego and concluded on March 9, 2024 in Los Angeles. The album's second single, "Dancinwithsomebawdy" was released on November 3, 2023, alongside a music video.

Ericdoa released the album's third single on December 15, 2023, titled "Sweet Tooth". The album released on January 19, 2024. In promotion of the album, Ericdoa conducted a livestream of a two hour long freestyle. A line from the freestyle, "Imagine if Ninja got a low taper fade", would become an internet meme, receiving over 17 million views.

== Critical reception ==
Professional ratings
Review scores
Source	Rating
Dork	4/5 stars
NME	4/5 stars

NME's Otis Robinson described the album as a "restless and electrifying" mix of genres including emo, hyperpop, trap, pop rock, and shoegaze. Alessandra Rincon of Ones to Watch wrote that the album sounded "abrasive, raw, and direct without sacrificing an ounce of the frivolous, spirited, and party-ready atmosphere at the core of it all." Writing for Dork, Martyn Young described the album as a "fevered rush through everything that makes his music thrilling" that "sounds abrasive, raw and direct but also sounds frivolous, ebullient and party-ready at the same time."

== Track listing ==
No.	Title	Writer(s)	Producer(s)	Length
1.	"The Cake Is a Lie"	Eric Lopez; Caleb Kinnear Braddock	Dœgægé	2:03
2.	"Dancinwithsomebawdy"	Lopez; Dylan Sinclair; Francesco Romei; Liam Magrini	Zetra; Camoufly	2:23
3.	"Bigassbearman"	Lopez; Magrini; Alain Cartaya; Glasear; Gray Toomey; John Ong; Mochila; Zetra	Glasear; Gray Toomey; Mochila; Zetra	2:29
4.	"Kickstand"	Lopez; Steven Giron	Venny	2:10
5.	"Paystub"	Lopez; Javier Mercado; Morris Kef; Synthetic	Morris; Synthetic	2:17
6.	"Arm and a Leg"	Lopez	Ericdoa	2:21
7.	"Lastjune"	Lopez; Magrini; Jondren Hwang; Aaron Shadrow; Edgar Nathaniel Sarratt; III; Sophie Gray; Zetra	Aaron Shadrow; Malik Ninety Five; Sophie Gray; Zetra; Jondren^{[a]}	2:31
8.	"Imcoolimgoodimstraight"	Lopez; Alain Cartaya; Derek Mondock; Distance Decay; Glasear; Ong; Magrini; Mochila; Zetra	Glasear; Distance Decay; Mochila; Zetra	2:19
9.	"Crisis Actor"	Lopez; Noah Beresin; Ben Ash	Lopez; Noah Breakfast; Two Inch Punch	2:11
10.	"Sweet Tooth"	Lopez	Lopez	2:28
Total length:				23:15

Note

- ^{^[a]} signifies an additional producer

== Personnel ==
Musicians

- Ericdoa – vocals (all tracks); instrumentation, programming (tracks 2, 5, 6); acoustic bass guitar (6)
- Dœgægé – instrumentation (track 1)
- Glasear –instrumentation, programming (tracks 2, 8)
- Mochila – instrumentation, programming (tracks 2, 8)
- Gray Toomey – instrumentation, programming (track 2)
- Steve Giron – bass, drums, guitar, percussion, synthesizer (track 4)
- Morris – instrumentation, programming (track 5)
- Synthetic – instrumentation, programming (track 5)
- Zetra – programming (tracks 7, 8), instrumentation (8)
- Aaron Shadrow – guitar (track 7)
- Jondren – guitar, programming (track 7)
- Distance Decay – instrumentation, programming (track 8)
- Noah Breakfast – guitar (track 9)
- Two Inch Punch – programming (track 9)

Technical

- Jeremie Inhaber – mixing
- Ruari O'Flaherty – mastering
- John Ong – engineering (track 2)
- Ericdoa – engineering (track 10)
