= May It Never Falter =

Studio album by Glaive
- Released: October 11, 2024
- Recorded: April 3–17, 2024
- Genre: Noise pop; electronic
- Length: 23:43
- Label: Slowsilver03 (self-released)
- Producer: Ralph Castelli; John Cunningham; Glaive; Jeff Hazan; Kurtains; Jasper Sheff; User2222

Glaive chronology
A Bit of a Mad One (2024)	May It Never Falter (2024)	Y'all (2025)

Singles from May It Never Falter
- 1. "Live & Direct" Released: October 4, 2024

May It Never Falter is the second studio album by the American musician Glaive. It was self-released under the Slowsilver03 imprint on October 11, 2024. After releasing his debut album with Interscope Records in 2023, Glaive became an independent musician and travelled to Hvalfjarðarsveit, Iceland, to record May It Never Falter during April 2024. Glaive worked with Ralph Castelli, John Cunningham, and Jeff Hazin in Iceland, and with Kurtains in Wales to produce the record. A noise pop and electronic album, May It Never Falter was supported by the single "Live & Direct" and a North American tour during 2025. It was considered one of the best albums of the year by the editors at Vogue, who deemed it Glaive's best work to date.

== Background and composition ==
Glaive's debut album, I Care So Much That I Don't Care at All, was released in 2023 by Interscope Records, to generally favorable reviews from critics. Originally labelled a hyperpop artist by music publications, the album marked a shift towards emo, pop, and rock music. In February 2024, Glaive released his third solo extended play, A Bit of a Mad One, which saw him going back to hyperpop, as well as bedroom pop and emo rap. Following the EP's release, he travelled from North America to Hvalfjarðarsveit, Iceland, to record the majority of May It Never Falter. Glaive worked closely with John Cunningham, Ralph Castelli, and Jeff Hazin to create the album. He also travelled to Wales to record the song "Live & Direct" with Kurtains. The album was recorded from April 3 to 17, 2024.

May It Never Falter showcases Glaive's sound evolving from hyperpop to noise pop and electronic with elements of emo, according to Vogue's Taylor Antrim. He also described the album as being "suffused with a wintery, contemplative mood". Shahzaib Hussain of Clash wrote that the album "served as a coming-of-age narrative set against the backdrop of adolescence and self-discovery". The album's opening track, "For God and Country", starts with samples of a choir, builds through fluttering beats, and peaks in a purgative crescendo. "Live & Direct" is an alt-pop song. Antrim described "Everydog Has Its Day" as "pounding" and "danceable", while "Nobody's Fault / Accept My Own" as "aggressive, tuneful and relentless".

== Release and reception ==
May It Never Falter marked the start of Glaive becoming an independent musician. "Live & Direct" was released as May It Never Falter's lead single on October 4, 2024. The album was self-released under the Slowsilver03 imprint on October 11. After its release, Glaive undertook a tour across the United States throughout January and February 2025. The editors at Vogue included May It Never Falter in their list of the best albums of 2024. Antrim considered it an improvement over A Bit of a Mad One and deemed the songs "For God and Country", "Everydog Has Its Day", and "Nobody's Fault / Accept My Own" standout tracks. He said the latter "goes hard and never stops". The same publication also included "For God and Country" in their list of the year's best songs; Antrim called it a "densely layered" and "angsty" track, and concluded by stating that it is "catchy and relentless". He also deemed May It Never Falter Glaive's best work to date. Tyler Damara Kelly from The Line of Best Fit said "Live & Direct" "mark[ed] the beginnings of a new chapter in Glaive's artistry", while Clash's Robin Murray called it a "Welsh-born alt-pop banger".

== Track listing ==
All tracks are written and produced by Ash Gutierrez (Glaive), Cole Carmody (Ralph Castelli), John Cunningham, and Jeff Hazin, except where noted.

May It Never Falter track listing
No.	Title	Writer(s)	Producer(s)	Length
1.	"For God and Country"			2:43
2.	"60.000 ISK"			1:40
3.	"Count It Up"			1:51
4.	"IK"			2:07
5.	"Joel"			2:35
6.	"Live & Direct" (with Kurtains)	Gutierrez; Alex Davies	Glaive; Kurtains	1:47
7.	"Knock, Draw, Release"			2:10
8.	"Everydog Has Its Day"			2:12
9.	"Freudian"			2:00
10.	"Nobody's Fault / Accept My Own"		Castelli; Cunningham; Glaive; Hazin; User2222	2:08
11.	"By Birthright"			2:30
Total length:				23:43

=== Notes ===
- "IK" is an acronym for "I Know".
- "IK" and "Joel" are stylized in lowercase.
- "Everydog Has Its Day" is stylized in all caps.
- "Nobody's Fault / Accept My Own" is stylized as "Nobodys Fault / Accept My Own".

== Personnel ==
Credits are adapted from the liner notes of May It Never Falter and Tidal.

- Glaive – songwriting, production, recording
- Ralph Castelli – songwriting (1–5, 7–11), production (1–5, 7–11)
- John Cunningham – songwriting (1–5, 7–11), production (1–5, 7–11)
- Jeff Hazin – songwriting (1–5, 7–11), production (1–5, 7–11)
- Kurtains – songwriting (6), production (6)
- User2222 – production (10)
- Dave Kutch – mastering
- Omer Mosseri – crest
- Tommy Pointer – art direction, photography
