= Y'all (album) =

Studio album by Glaive
- Released: September 26, 2025
- Recorded: October 7, 2024 – April 24, 2025
- Length: 38:40
- Labels: Broke; Slowsilver03
- Producers: Ralph Castelli; John Cunningham; Glaive; Jeff Hazin; Jasper Sheff

Glaive chronology
May It Never Falter (2024)	Y'all (2025)	God Save the Three (2026)

Singles from Y'all
- 1. "Asheville" Released: July 18, 2025; 2. "Appalachia" Released: August 20, 2025

Y'all is the third studio album by the American musician Glaive. It was released via Broke under the Slowsilver03 imprint on September 26, 2025. It was preceded by the singles "Asheville" and "Appalachia".

== Background ==
Glaive released his second studio album, May It Never Falter, in October 2024. In January 2025, during the first stop on his tour supporting May It Never Falter in Phoenix, Arizona, he performed the unreleased song "Modafinil" and stated that it was "off an album that [he] made at the end of last year", which will "probably come out at some point". He performed a charity concert in Asheville, North Carolina on April 17 alongside Dazegxd, Ericdoa, and Jane Remover, and announced to fans afterwards that his third studio album would be titled Y'all, and played them the songs "Asheville" and "Weird".

Y'all was recorded from October 7, 2024, to April 24, 2025, with sessions taking place in Big Lake, Alaska, Nicasio, California, and Asheville. "Appalachia" was recorded shortly after Glaive's Asheville concert, with him stating that he "felt like the only person from my area to do anything remotely interesting and I was sort of in a weird pride/ego elated state for a few weeks after and this song was made during those excited days". The song samples a recording of the American folk standard "The House-Carpenter", and was described by The Guardian as a "heavy, distorted trance rager". Margaret Farrell of Stereogum described the song as a "whirlwind of recontextualized history" with "the past chatting with the future over a dizzying club beat", and stated that it sees Glaive "scream-singing about his success, returning to his hometown, and people judging him".

== Composition ==
"Asheville" was described by Shahzaib Hussain of Clash as "part memoir, part theatre". Hussain also felt that the song "takes his hyper-pop tendencies to the limit, morphing from globular passages to a propulsive four-to-the-floor anthem". In a press release, Shahzaib Hussain of Clash described the album as "the story of a teenager pulled up from his roots, finally returning to his hometown in North Carolina, a radically changed person in an unchanged place". Hussain also detailed the "reggaeton-influenced" track "Nouveau Riche", as well as a "mind-melting trance experiment" on the song "Foreigner", and called the album Glaive's "most dance-driven, maximalist work to date".

== Promotion and release ==
The lead single for Y'all, "Asheville", was released on July 18, 2025, alongside a music video directed by Tommy Pointer. Glaive stated that the song "encapsulates the feelings felt coming home", and is about how "it is strangely confusing to try to make a place new that you have known for your entire life". The album's second single, "Appalachia", was released on August 20. On September 9, Glaive officially announced that Y'all would be released on September 26, and revealed its cover art.

Following the album's release, music videos for "We Don't Leave the House", "Nouveau Riche" and "It Is What It Is" were released.

== Track listing ==
No.	Title	Length
1.	"Asheville"	2:38
2.	"Appalachia"	2:18
3.	"Nouveau Riche"	1:57
4.	"Fuck"	2:58
5.	"Bluebirds"	2:30
6.	"Veni Vidi Vici"	2:03
7.	"We Don't Leave the House"	2:25
8.	"Foreigner"	2:19
9.	"9"	2:31
10.	"It Is What It Is"	2:22
11.	"Modafinil" (with Kurtains and Kai Angel)	2:22
12.	"Polo Ponies"	2:39
13.	"I Love You and It Sounds Stupid"	2:40
14.	"Crying, Laughing, Loving, Lying"	2:23
15.	"Weird"	1:25
16.	"Bennie & Kay"	3:10
Total length:		38:40

=== Notes ===
- "I Love You and It Sounds Stupid" is stylized in all lowercase.
