= Glaive (musician) =

American musician (born 2005)

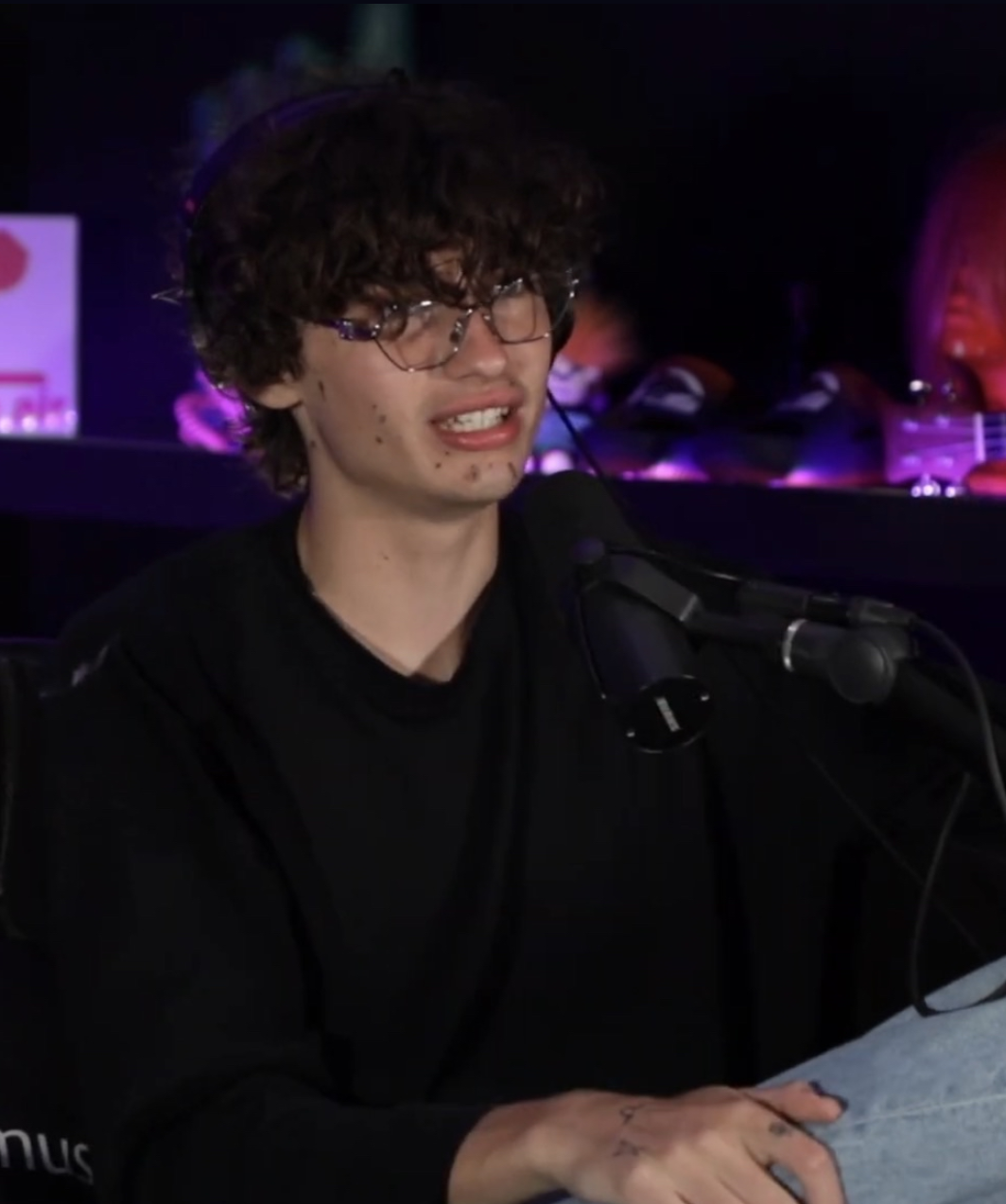
- Gutierrez in 2023
- Born: Ash Blue Gutierrez; January 20, 2005 (age 21); Florida, U.S.
- Other name: ovine hall
- Occupations: Singer; songwriter; rapper; record producer
- Years active: 2018–present
- Works: Discography
- Relatives: Bennie Gutierrez (grandfather)
- Musical career
- Origin: Hendersonville, North Carolina, U.S.
- Genres: Hyperpop; digicore; pop rap; folk-pop; indie rock; emo
- Instruments: Vocals; guitar
- Labels: Broke; Interscope
- Website: www.glaivemusic.com

Ash Blue Gutierrez (born January 20, 2005), known professionally as Glaive (stylized as glaive), is an American singer-songwriter. After posting a string of hyperpop songs to SoundCloud during the beginning of the COVID-19 pandemic that earned him a following, he signed a record deal with Interscope Records and released his debut extended play, Cypress Grove, in 2020. His debut album, I Care So Much That I Don't Care at All, was released in 2023. His second album, May It Never Falter, was released in 2024. His third, Y'all, was released in September 2025. A collaborative album with Kurtains called God Save the Three, was released in May 2026. Glaive's fourth solo studio album, Polesden Lacey, is set for release in January 2027.

== Early life ==
Glaive was born on January 20, 2005, in Florida. His father was a professional polo player, and his family lived near Sarasota for nine years before moving to Hendersonville, North Carolina. Glaive's grandfather, Bennie Gutierrez, was also a professional polo player, and the inspiration of the logo of Polo Ralph Lauren. Before pursuing a solo career, he was in a band.

== Career ==
=== 2020–2021: Cypress Grove, All Dogs Go to Heaven, Then I'll Be Happy, and Old Dog, New Tricks ===
Towards the beginning of the COVID-19 pandemic, while attending high school virtually, Glaive began recording music in his bedroom. His name is inspired by a weapon from the 2016 video game Dark Souls III, and he uploaded his first song to SoundCloud in April 2020 using the alias. He would later go on to redefine his name as standing for "good lord always invoke virtuous energy" in the music video for Even When the Sun Is Dead, Will You Tell Them How Hard I Tried. He began collaborating with other hyperpop artists on SoundCloud after being introduced to them through Discord servers. He quickly became popular on SoundCloud and Dan Awad, Glaive's current manager, discovered him through his song "Sick" in the summer of 2020. Soon after, he started regularly appearing on Spotify's "Hyperpop" playlist and signed a record deal with Interscope Records.

He released the single "Clover" on August 5, 2020. On November 13, he released the single "Eyesore", the fourth and final single to his debut extended play (EP), Cypress Grove. Later that month, on November 19, the EP was released through Interscope Records after he wrote and recorded it in a week. The lead single "Cloak n Dagger" for his collaborative EP with Ericdoa, Then I'll Be Happy, was released on January 21, 2021. The music video for his song "Astrid", directed and shot by Hunter Ray Barker and Charlie Grant, was released in February. The lead single to his second EP, All Dogs Go to Heaven, "I Wanna Slam My Head Against the Wall" was released in March. In April, he collaborated with Aldn on "What Was the Last Thing U Said", and in June, he was featured on Renforshort's single "Fall Apart" from her EP Off Saint Dominique. That month, he released All Dogs Go to Heaven's second single, "Detest Me", and in July, its third single, "Bastard". He released the EP in early August, then a collaborative EP with Ericdoa, titled Then I'll Be Happy, in October. They then toured as a duo across North America in support of the release, alongside Midwxst, Aldn, and Underscores. Glaive followed it with "Prick" in November, the lead single of All Dogs Go to Heaven's deluxe edition, Old Dog, New Tricks, which was released with four more songs in January 2022.

=== 2022–2023: First headline tour and I Care So Much That I Don't Care at All ===
Across three weeks in February 2022, Glaive embarked on his first headlining tour in support of Old Dog, New Tricks, with Aldn and Midwxst as opening acts. He began touring Europe in June, both as an opening act for The Kid Laroi's The End of the world Tour and as an independent artist. That month, he released the single "Minnesota Is a Place That Exists" and announced a supporting autumn tour, his second of North America. Late that month, he released the single "Three Wheels and It Still Drives!".

Glaive's debut studio album, I Care So Much That I Don't Care at All, was released on July 14, 2023. The album's lead single, "As If", was released on April 28 and samples Timothée Chalamet during his performance of the 2016 play Prodigal Son. On May 1, Glaive announced his third North American tour in support of the album, with support from Origami Angel, Oso Oso, and Polo Perks, which took place from July 27 – August 19. On May 17, Glaive released a second single, "I'm Nothing That's All I Am". On June 5, 2023, he announced his second Europe tour in support of the album, which took place from November 11–21. On June 7, he released a third single, "All I Do Is Try My Best", which is the second song on the album to be accompanied by a music video. On June 30, Glaive released a fourth single, "The Car", which is the third song on the album to be accompanied with a music video.

=== 2024–2025: A Bit of a Mad One, departure from Interscope, May It Never Falter, and Y'all ===
On January 26, 2024, Glaive released the single "Huh", his first of the year which he recorded in Hope, Alaska.

On February 2, Glaive followed up with the release of "Even When the Sun Is Dead, Will You Tell Them How Hard I Tried" which he also recorded in Hope, Alaska alongside the rest of the coming EP. The last single from the EP, "I Don't Really Feel It Anymore", was released on February 16. After a successful social media campaign promoting the EP, including self-edited music videos, his fourth solo EP, A Bit of a Mad One was released on February 23.

On March 12, Glaive announced on his private X (formerly Twitter) account, glaiv4, that he was planning to travel to Iceland to work on his next album. On May 3, he revealed on a Twitch live stream that the album would be titled By Birthright. On May 10, he released the non-album single "Tijuana Freestyle", alongside a self-directed music video. On June 14, he and Welsh musician Kurtains released the single "Just Not Sure", which would later be included on Kurtains' EP Florence Fields.

On June 24, Glaive took to his private X account to confirm that he is no longer with Interscope Records and is now an independent artist. He posted as follows on X: "No more label ever again btw." He would later further elaborate on his main X account: "Didn't tweet this on main but no more label they didn't do me wrong or anything i just want to own my shit forever, love."

On August 18, Glaive officially announced that his second studio album would be titled May It Never Falter, instead of the originally planned title, By Birthright. He would then post snippets of various songs on the album to his social media pages throughout the following weeks. Though initially stating that there would be no singles for the album, he released one single, "Live & Direct" with Kurtains, on October 4. May It Never Falter was officially released one week later, on October 11.

On January 8, 2025, Glaive began his headlining tour in support of May It Never Falter. During this first concert of the tour in Phoenix, Arizona, he played an unreleased song titled "Modafinil" that he stated was "off an album that [he] made at the end of last year", which will "probably come out at some point". Two other unreleased songs, "We Don't Leave the House" and "Foreigner", were also played on this tour.

On April 17, following a charity concert in Asheville alongside Dazegxd, Ericdoa, and Jane Remover, Glaive announced to fans that his third studio album would be titled Y'all, as well as previewing unreleased songs "Asheville" and "Weird".

On July 18, "Asheville" was released as the lead single from Y'all. The album's second single, "Appalachia", was released on August 20. On September 9, Glaive announced that Y'all would be released on September 26. After the album release, he began an international headlining tour in support of Y'all on January 3, 2026.

=== 2026–present: God Save the Three and Polesden Lacey ===
On April 24, 2026, Glaive and Kurtains released "The Troubles" as the lead single for their collaborative album God Save the Three. The pair released the album on May 8, 2026.

On November 5, 2026, Glaive announced his fourth solo studio album Polesden Lacey for release on January 22, 2027 with 19 tracks including single "Asheghanistan".

== Musical style ==
Glaive's music has often been described as hyperpop. He has described his own music as "straight-up pop songs" with "nothing hyper about them", and stated that his music being labeled as hyperpop is a result of him being associated with other people who make hyperpop. He has also been deemed a pioneer of the digicore genre, a more underground, largely teenage offshoot of hyperpop that uses elements of trap and emo rap with a DIY ethic. His music has included elements of Midwest emo, emo, glitch, pop punk, hip hop, trap, EDM, and indie rock. He has described his music as being about "being annoyed or mad", and has stated that he is inspired by hip hop production. His lyrics address topics such as alienation and mental health.

Colin Joyce of The Fader described Glaive's songs as "genre-hopping" and "self-assured", while Pigeons and Planes wrote that Glaive took a "free-for-all approach" to his music and has "a gift for structure and melody". Vulture's Justin Curto called Glaive's lyrics "painfully honest", while Jeff Ihaza of Rolling Stone wrote that Glaive "has a way with clear-eyed vulnerability". Billboard's Andrew Unterberger called Glaive a "cutting-edge pop artist"; Daisy Jones of Vice stated that his sound was "sugary, emotive and intuitive".

== Personal life ==
Glaive is bisexual. He addresses his coming out and identity across I Care So Much That I Don't Care at All, and specifically on "As If".

== Discography ==
Solo studio albums

- I Care So Much That I Don't Care at All (2023)
- May It Never Falter (2024)
- Y'all (2025)
- Polesden Lacey (2027)

Collaborative studio albums

- God Save the Three (2026)
