= A Bit of a Mad One =

EP by Glaive
- Released: February 23, 2024
- Recorded: November 2023
- Genres: Bedroom pop; hyperpop; emo rap
- Length: 13:51
- Label: Interscope
- Producers: Ralph Castelli; John Cunningham; Jeff Hazin; Will Kraus; Jasper Sheff

Glaive chronology
I Care So Much That I Don't Care at All (2023)	A Bit of a Mad One (2024)	May It Never Falter (2024)

Singles from A Bit of a Mad One
- 1. "Huh" Released: January 26, 2024; 2. "Even When the Sun Is Dead, Will You Tell Them How Hard I Tried (Note: Originally titled "Even When the Sun Is Dead" upon the single's release but was changed to the current title before the EP's release.)" Released: February 2, 2024; 3. "I Don't Really Feel It Anymore" Released: February 16, 2024

A Bit of a Mad One is the third solo extended play (EP) by the American musician Glaive. It was released on February 23, 2024, via Interscope Records. After becoming frustrated with recording in Los Angeles and North Carolina, Glaive and the producers Jeff Hazin, Ralph Castelli, and John Cunningham holed up in Hope, Alaska to record the EP. While staying in Hope, Glaive made a spontaneous decision to buzz his signature curly hair to change his image. Primarily a bedroom pop, hyperpop, and emo rap release, Glaive was inspired by Russian hip hop, Lucki, ambient music, and hardstyle. Additional production from Jasper Sheff and Will Kraus was featured on the track "Living Proof (That It Hurts)". The EP was promoted by three singles and was included in Vogue's mid-year list of the best albums of 2023.

== Background and recording ==
Glaive released his debut studio album I Care So Much That I Don't Care at All in 2023. It marked a change in his sound, moving away from the hyperpop genre and delving more into a sound more akin to emo pop and Midwest emo. It received generally favorable reviews from critics, but some felt negative about his departure from hyperpop. Following the release of the album, Glaive was nervous about his music not being what it used to be.

After recording his debut album in Los Angeles, Glaive was frustrated with recording in the city. He wanted a new experience, so he did not want to record A Bit of a Mad One in North Carolina because he has already made music there. Because of this, Glaive chose to record the EP in Hope, Alaska. The idea of going to Alaska originated due to one of the EP's producers, Ralph Castelli, being from Alaska. So Glaive, along with the EP's producers John Cunningham, Jeff Hazin, and Castelli decided to go the state. With the exception of the song "I Don't Really Feel It Anymore", it was recorded in ten days during November 2023. At times, he would record up to two songs a day for the EP. He caught strep throat due to the cold environment, but he has described his time in Hope as "one of [his] favorite times of [his] entire life."

Throughout his career, Glaive had signature curly hair. While he was creating the EP, he was afraid his hair would always look the same and get boring. So, he made a spontaneous decision and let somebody shave his head to "fuck with [his] shtick". Fans theorizied that it was either a deepfake, military school, or that he got a part in a war film. Hazin and Castelli were returning collaborators, while Cunningham was a new collaborator. Will Kraus and Jasper Sheff contributed as producers to the track "Living Proof (That It Hurts)". While creating the EP, Glaive listened to Russian hip hop, Lucki, ambient music, and hardstyle mixes on SoundCloud. Because of this, he no longer wanted to create Midwest emo, and instead opted to create hardstyle.

== Composition ==
=== Overview ===
A Bit of a Mad One has been classified as bedroom pop and hyperpop by HotNewHipHop. Grace McFadden of the WHUS radio station called it emo rap and hyperpop. The EP explores themes of heartbreak, depression, adolescent angst, religion, and progression of self-discovery. Abby Kenna of Ones to Watch described the EP as "refining the hyperpop and alternative fusion that [Glaive] has cultivated with a focused perspective."

=== Songs ===
The EP contains seven tracks. The opening track "Even When the Sun Is Dead, Will You Tell Them How Hard I Tried" begins with a raw guitar and vocal, then transitions into a hardstyle landscape of instruments, high-BPM synths and "warm" vocal layers. The track reflects on Glaive's mortality. "I Don't Really Feel It Anymore" explores the pain of a past relationship and moving on, while "Huh" is more love-oriented. The former is "built around a hummed, pitched-up melody", while the latter consists of subtle synths and industrial percussion. "Hope Alaska National Anthem", a bedroom pop track which drew comparisons to Cavetown and Alex G, gives context into Glaive's emotional space while writing the EP. On "God Is Dead", Glaive tackles his guilt, pain, and self-reflection using a biblical lens that doubles as a motif used throughout the EP atop a hardstyle climax. "Living Proof (That It Hurts)" starts with gentle acoustics and moves to a "noisy and chaotic finish" consisted of industrial noise. Glaive has labelled it as his most personal song and was described as the EP's darkest point by John Norris of V. The closing track "Phobie D'Impulsion" is also focused on religion, backed by an acoustic guitar and an upbeat melody. It reveals struggles in Glaive's life and confesses to social anxiety, but also expresses themes of optimism.

=== Artwork ===
The EP's artwork is a painting of two horses by the Swedish painter Julia de Ruvo. When Glaive was asked why he chose horses to be on the EP's cover, he responded with "I come from a polo family...I was around horses a lot when I was younger...I just love horses, I've been around them since I was a kid."

== Promotion and release ==
A Bit of a Mad One's lead single "Huh" was released on January 26, 2024 and was accompanied by a music video directed by Glaive. The EP was announced alongside the release of the second single "Even When the Sun Is Dead, Will You Tell Them How Hard I Tried" and its music video on February 2, 2024. The third and final single "I Don't Really Feel It Anymore" was released on February 16, 2024 alongside a music video. Glaive originally scheduled a release date of January 1, 2024, but despite this, A Bit of a Mad One was released on February 23, 2024, via Interscope Records.

== Reception ==
A Bit of a Mad One was included in Vogue's mid-year list of the best albums of 2024. Taylor Antrim wrote that it is "denser and darker and more infectious start to finish than anything he’s put out" and that "[h]is best compositions are relentless, earnest, assaultive, offhand, and weirdly pretty at the same time". In a review for the WHUS radio station, McFadden criticized the album's instrumentals, writing that they "can be a little too clean, and fall flat", but said the EP "still has shining moments which are hard to find on other records right now."

== Track listing ==
All tracks are written by Ash Gutierrez (Glaive), Ralph Castelli, John Cunningham, and Jeff Hazin and produced by Castelli, Cunningham, and Hazin, except where noted.

A Bit of a Mad One track listing
No.	Title	Writer(s)	Producer(s)	Length
1.	"Even When the Sun Is Dead, Will You Tell Them How Hard I Tried"			2:16
2.	"I Don't Really Feel It Anymore"	Gutierrez; Dora Jar; Castelli; Cunningham; Hazin		2:00
3.	"Huh"			1:47
4.	"Hope Alaska National Anthem"			1:59
5.	"God Is Dead"			2:11
6.	"Living Proof (That It Hurts)"		Castelli; Cunningham; Hazin; Will Kraus; Jasper Sheff	1:43
7.	"Phobie d'Impulsion"			1:55
Total length:				13:51

Notes

- All tracks are stylized in lower case.

== Personnel ==
Credits adapted from Tidal.

Musicians

- Glaive – vocals (all tracks)
- Dora Jar – background vocals (2)
- Will Kraus – drums (6)

Engineers

- Jeff Hazin – engineering (1, 2, 4–7), mixing (all tracks), recording (5–7)
- John Cunningham – engineer (1, 2, 4–7), mixing (1, 3–7), recording (5–7)
- Ralph Castelli – engineer (1, 2, 4–7), mixing (1, 3–7), recording (5–7)
- Ash Gutierrez – engineer (2), mixing (2), recording (5–7)
- Dave Kutch – mastering (1, 2, 4–7)

== Release history ==
Region	Date	Format(s)	Label	Ref.
Various	February 23, 2024	Streaming; digital download	Interscope Records	
