= Quinn (musician) =

American musician (born 2004)

- Quinn in 2026

Background information
- Also known as: Osquinn; P4rkr; Cat Mother; Trench Dog; User-574126634; Rifleman; DJ Weird Bitch; Yungx$t
- Born: Quinn Dupree; December 15, 2004 (age 21); Baltimore, Maryland, U.S.
- Origin: Virginia, U.S.
- Genres: Hyperpop; pop; hip hop; digicore
- Occupations: Musician; singer; rapper; DJ
- Instruments: Vocals; synthesizer; bass guitar
- Years active: 2018–present
- Label: DeadAir
- Member of: Novagang
- Website: 04lowlife.com

Quinn Dupree (born December 15, 2004), known professionally as Osquinn or simply Quinn (both stylized in all lowercase), is an American musician. Her debut studio album, Drive-By Lullabies, was released in 2021. Her second studio album, Quinn, was released in 2022 through the independent record label deadAir Records, of which she is a co-founder. Her third studio album, Stars Fell on Trench, was released in 2024.

== Early life ==
Quinn Dupree was born in Baltimore, Maryland, on December 15, 2004. Due to her father's work as a master sergeant, Dupree grew up between Pittsburgh and Virginia. At some point in her childhood, she moved to Northern Virginia, specifically in Woodbridge. She briefly attended Colgan High School, which she mentions in her track "A Love Letter to Colgan High School", before moving in October 2021 to Fort Benning. Prior to taking on a hyperpop or digicore sound, she made trap metal under the name Yungx$t. She grew up listening to Chicago drill.

== Career ==
In 2019, Dupree joined a Discord server and befriended artists like Midwxst, Saturn, Blackwinterwells and Ericdoa, each of whom she released songs with. During the initial COVID-19 lockdowns of 2020, she received widespread exposure from a shoutout by experimental pop duo 100 gecs, and her songs (most notably "i don't want that many friends in the first place") were added to Spotify's hyperpop editorial playlist.

In late 2021 and 2022, Quinn switched to a more hip hop-influenced style for her debut album, Drive-By Lullabies, and its eponymous successor, a sound which The Fader called "jazzy collage".

Quinn released her third studio album, Stars Fell On Trench, on her 20th birthday on December 15, 2024.

On July 26, 2025, Quinn released an EP named 'Lowlife' which teased their upcoming clothing brand, 04LOWLIFE. The brand had its first official drop on September 25, 2025.

On August 12, 2025, Quinn released the single "Bags" featuring artist and producer feardorian, teasing a collaborative album. Four more singles were released before their album "Before You Press Play" got published on November 14th 2025.

== Critical reception ==
Pitchfork named "Ok I'm Cool" as the 27th best song of the decade so far in their September 2024 list.

== Discography ==
=== Studio albums ===
Title	Album details
Drive-By Lullabies	Released: September 17, 2021; Label: Dismiss Yourself (initial release), DeadAir (re-release); Format: LP, CD, cassette, digital download, streaming
Quinn	Released: July 22, 2022; Label: DeadAir; Format: CD, cassette, digital download, streaming
Stars Fell on Trench	Released: December 15, 2024; Label: Self-released; Format: Digital download, streaming
Before You Press Play (with FearDorian)	Release: November 14, 2025; Label: Self-released; Format: Streaming

=== Mixtapes ===
Title	Mixtape details
I'm Going Insane	Released: March 20, 2022; Label: Self-released; Format: CD, Digital download, streaming (Bandcamp)
Sick Shit	Released: November 21, 2022; Label: Self-released; Format: Digital download, streaming (Bandcamp)
Delinquent	Released: January 27, 2023; Label: Self-released; Format: Digital download, streaming
SF44	Released: March 21, 2023; Label: Self-released; Format: Digital download, streaming
Interstate185	Released: May 30, 2023; Label: Self-released; Format: Digital download, streaming
I Used to Just Cry About It	Released: October 13, 2023; Label: Self-released; Format: Digital download, streaming

=== Extended plays ===
Title	EP details
A Night in Virginia	Released: April 25, 2020; Label: DeadAir (initial release), Self-released (re-release); Format: Digital download, streaming
Bleh	Released: May 10, 2020; Label: Self-released; Format: Digital download, streaming
Beat Tape No. 1	Released: October 8, 2021; Label: DeadAir; Format: Digital download, streaming
Beat Tape No. 2	Released: January 18, 2022; Label: DeadAir; Format: Digital download, streaming (Bandcamp)
Dope Shit	Released: February 7, 2022; Label: DeadAir; Format: Digital download, streaming
dSX.fm (with Dazegxd)	Released: April 26, 2023; Label: DeadAir; Format: Digital download, streaming
Slaps	Released: June 22, 2023; Label: Self-released; Format: Digital download, streaming
Of The World	Released: April 25, 2025; Label: Self-released; Format: Digital download, streaming
Lowlife	Released: July 26, 2025; Label: Self-released; Format: Digital download, streaming
SLAPS, Vol. II	Released: May 19, 2026; Label: Self-released; Format: Digital download, streaming

=== Collaborative singles ===
Tiltle	Year	Details	Album
"Gooncity Anthem" (with Gooncity, B07gem, Kevinhilfiger, Kasper Gem, Vescure, and Killz)	2020	Released: March 30, 2020; Label: Gooncity Records; Format: Digital download, streaming	Non-album releases
"Talk Shit" (with Chach and Ericdoa)	2020	Released: May 4, 2020; Label: Bbloodhounds; Format: Digital download, Streaming	Non-album releases
"Strength Bonus" (with Blackwinterwells)	2021	Released: January 11, 2021; Label: Helix Tears; Format: Digital download, streaming; Featuring: Fish Narc	Non-album releases
