= COA (album) =

Studio album by Ericdoa
- Released: November 6, 2020
- Recorded: 2019–2020
- Genre: Hyperpop
- Length: 22:56
- Label: UMG; Interscope
- Producer: Ericdoa; Delto; Fendii; Fortune Swan; Glasear; grandma; kimj; Skress; vvspipes

Ericdoa chronology
Hi, I'm Dante (2020)	COA (2020)	Then I'll Be Happy (2021)

COA is the debut studio album by the American musician Ericdoa. It was released by Interscope Records and Listen to the Kids on November 6, 2020. It experiments with sounds of the hyperpop genre, that were seen as smoldering angst. The EP was produced by Ericdoa with contributions from a variety of record producers including Glasear, Kimj, and Vvspipes. Upon release, it had received mixed reviews from critics.

== Background and release ==
He would be on the internet for quite some time, and become a rising star in hyperpop scene, differentiating himself throughout his amorphous tracks often filled with glitching and distorted vocals. The album addresses themes of heartbreak, and the cover art was shot in BDSM dungeon. Following the release of the mixtape Public Target, Eric quickly followed up with COA in 2020, which would get him signed and was later re-released through Interscope Records.

== Critical reception ==
Professional ratings
Review scores
Source	Rating
Pitchfork	6.8/10

Mano Sundaresan of Pitchfork said that the album was "thrilling, full of smoking angst, it feels symbolic of the moods and textures that this scene intends to seize." While NME's felt that it was "an exhilarating rush of Autotune and garish synths".

== Track listing ==
All tracks are written by Eric Lopez (Ericdoa), with additional writers noted.

COA track listing
No.	Title	Writer(s)	Producer(s)	Length
1.	"2008"		Kimj	2:18
2.	"Likewise"		Kimj; Glasear; Vvspipes	2:29
3.	"Ivy"		Kimj; Glasear; Vvspipes	1:58
4.	"Self Sabotage"		ericdoa; Kimj; Delto	2:06
5.	"Deep End"		Kimj; Glasear; Vvspipes; Fendii	2:11
6.	"Mistake"		Delto; Glasear	2:05
7.	"Do or Die (Interlude)"		Dante Red	1:05
8.	"Loose Ties" (featuring Grandma)	Liam Hall	Glasear; Grandma	2:00
9.	"Thingsudo2me" (featuring Brakence)	Randy Findell	FortuneSwan	2:25
10.	"Thanks4thewarning"		Skress	1:51
11.	"Plea"		Kimj; Glasear	2:28
Total length:				22:56

Notes

- All tracks are stylized in lowercase.
