= Cloak n Dagger =

Single by Glaive and Ericdoa

from the EP Then I'll Be Happy
- Released: January 21, 2021
- Recorded: January 2021
- Studio: Airbnb homestay (North Carolina)
- Genre: Rap; pop; emo
- Length: 2:09
- Label: Interscope; Listen to the Kids
- Songwriter(s): Ash Gutierrez; Eric Lopez; Zac Greer; Jaehyun Kim; John Ong; Ethan Snoreck
- Producer(s): Glasear; Kimj; Whethan

Glaive singles chronology
"Eyesore" (2020)	"Cloak n Dagger" (2021)	"I Wanna Slam My Head Against the Wall" (2021)

Ericdoa singles chronology
"Movinglikeazombie (remix)" (2020)	"Cloak n Dagger" (2021)	"Fantasize" (2021)

Music video
- "Cloak n Dagger" on YouTube

"Cloak n Dagger" is a song by the American musicians Glaive and Ericdoa from their collaborative extended play (EP), Then I'll Be Happy (2021). It was released by Interscope Records and Listen to the Kids on January 21, 2021, as the EP's lead single. It was recorded in one day at an Airbnb homestay in North Carolina during January 2021. It was released alongside a music video created on the same day as the song, which contains cameo appearances from the song's producers, Glasear, Kimj, and Whethan. Glaive and Ericdoa wrote the song alongside the producers.

"Cloak n Dagger" is a fast-paced rap, pop, and emo song driven by retro synth layers, a hazy instrumental, and gated drums. The song was written about removing a harmful person from your life; the hook was written about saying "fuck you" to somebody the duo wants to "rot in hell". "Cloak n Dagger" received positive reviews from critics; some thought it was a standout on Then I'll Be Happy and others highlighted the song's hook.

== Background and release ==
Glaive and Ericdoa are frequent collaborators. They are also considered rising stars in the digicore genre; The Fader's Alex Robert Ross called Glaive "the most promising kid in pop music" and Sophie Leigh Walker of The Line of Best Fit called Ericdoa a digicore pioneer. They teased collaborations with each other on their social media, and released their collaborative extended play (EP) Then I'll Be Happy on October 6, 2021. "Cloak n Dagger" served as the lead single, and appears as the seventh track on the EP. The song was released by Interscope Records and Listen to the Kids on January 21, 2021, to celebrate Glaive's 16th birthday, which was the day prior to the song's release.

On the day of its release, Glaive and Ericdoa were added to the cover of Spotify's "Hyperpop" playlist. "Cloak n Dagger" was recorded at an Airbnb homestay in North Carolina in one day during January 2021. Fans dubbed the Airbnb as the "Hyperpop Hype House". Glaive and Ericdoa also recorded a music video on the same day the song was made. The music video was shot on film and contains cameo appearances from the song's producers, Glasear, Kimj, and Whethan.

== Composition ==
"Cloak n Dagger" is two minutes and nine seconds long. Both Glaive and Ericdoa wrote the song, alongside the producers Glasear, Kimj, and Whethan. Critics have described "Cloak n Dagger" as a rap, pop, and emo track. The Line of Best Fit's Matthew Kent described it as a "fast-paced" pop song. The song is driven by "retro-inspired synth layering", a "woozy" instrumental, and gated drums. The song was written about removing a harmful person from your life; Alphonse Pierre of Pitchfork called it a "two-sided lovesick anthem". The hook was written about saying "fuck you" to somebody the duo wants to "rot in hell". It is sung "in a fit of rage", and Glaive's voice cracks during one of its lines. Pitchfork's Mano Sundaresan described it as "one of the most spiteful hooks [Glaive has] ever written". He also highlighted the track's "off-the-cuff arrangements", called the songwriting confessional, and commented that the lyrics "could be read as rap or emo". Glaive's contribution was described as "a regretful emoji-filled social media rant" by Pierre, while Ericdoa's verse is more empathetic. The Face's Jade Wickes called it a "tune infused with screaming teenage angst".

== Critical reception ==
"Cloak n Dagger" received positive reviews. It was listed as Pitchfork's "must-hear rap song of the day", with Pierre writing that it "could fit on a playlist right after Future's 'Throw Away'". Justin Curto from Vulture thought that "the chorus is the reason to come back", and that "Hearing [Glaive] and [Ericdoa] savor every curse and insult will just make you want to shout along with them". He also described it as "an unrelenting fuck-you smash". In a review of Then I'll Be Happy, Sundaresan thought the song was a standout from the EP. Writing about "Cloak n Dagger" and the EP's second single "Fuck This Town", he called the songs "thoughtful genre explorations that subvert norms instead of succumbing to them". Kent wrote that the duo "both trade in huge hooks" and the track "has one ready for crowd to scream back to them". He also called it a "standout pop track".

== Personnel ==
Credits adapted from Tidal.

- Glaive – vocals, songwriting, recording
- Ericdoa – vocals, songwriting, recording
- Prash "Engine-Earz" Mistry – mixing, mastering
- Whethan – songwriting, production, mixing, recording
- Glasear – songwriting, production, mixing, recording
- Kimj – songwriting, production, mixing, recording
- Zac Greer – songwriting
