= God Save the Three =

Studio album by Glaive and Kurtains
- Released: May 8, 2026
- Recorded: July 4 – December 9, 2025
- Genres: Digicore; Britpop; Indie rock
- Length: 29:39
- Labels: Slowsilver03; Broke
- Producers: Glaive; Kurtains; Oliver Grasse

Glaive chronology
Y'all (2025)	God Save the Three (2026)	Polesden Lacey (2027)

Kurtains chronology
Sandy Nevermore (2025)	God Save the Three (2026)	Serious International Business (2026)

Singles from God Save the Three
- 1. "The Troubles" Released: April 24, 2026

God Save the Three is a collaborative commercial studio album between American musician Glaive and Welsh musician Kurtains. Released on May 8, 2026, under Broke Records, the project was entirely produced by the two, with additional help from Oliver Grasse. The project was preceded by its lead single "The Troubles", which was released on April 24, 2026.

== Background ==
Before the release of Glaive's third studio album Y'all, the idea God Save The Three first emerged from an impromptu trip to Glaive's home city Asheville, North Carolina, in July 2025, where the project's first tracks "Weston Super Mare", and "Crisis", were all recorded in rapid succession. According to the two, the project's development stages came rather instinctually and unplanned. Following the birth of a new project, the two traveled to The Cotswolds in the United Kingdom where they began working on the majority of the project. The lead single, "The Troubles" was recorded in September 2025 in The Cotswolds. On April 24, 2026, the duo released "The Troubles" paired with an Instagram post revealing the album's release date and track list, showcasing that the project would see an official release on May 8, 2026.

== Composition ==
God Save The Three features 12 tracks and is a genre-blending album that combines elements of trap, electropop, digicore, indie rock, pop rap, and cloud rap. The project, in accordance with the two, serves as a personal connection to their growth and relationship as more than just "friends", but as "brothers". The moods on this album are "softer, affectionate and upbeat, with ballad-y interludes of acoustic guitar and piano", according to Taylor Antrim of Vogue.

== Release and promotion ==
The album's lead single "The Troubles" was recorded in The Cotswolds, United Kingdom, and released on April 24, 2026. That same day, the album's cover art, track list, and release date were all revealed, showcasing that the album's official release would be set for May 8, 2026. Three days after, Glaive announced an accompanying tour, with support from Tiffany Day. The tour ran from September to December.

== Critical reception ==
Taylor Antrim of Vogue labeled it one of "the best albums of 2026 (so far)". He praised the album's personal connection to the two and the production that came with it. Furthermore, he praised the tracks “The Front,” “The Band,” “Let’s Link Up and Die,” and the album's lead single, which he stated as the album's "out-and-out banger" due to its jubilant refrain, “We get money, like the Troubles, blow it at the mall.”

== Track listing ==
All tracks are written by Ash Blue Gutierrez and Alex Davies, and produced by Glaive and Kurtains, except where noted.

God Save The Three track listing
No.	Title	Writer(s)	Producer(s)	Length
1.	"Weston Super Mare"			2:24
2.	"Half Two"			2:47
3.	"The Band"			2:57
4.	"Yaya Touré"			2:00
5.	"Spinning Around"			2:41
6.	"Old Freight Trains Interlude"			1:29
7.	"The Front"	Gutierrez; Davies; Oliver Grasse	Oliver Grasse	1:41
8.	"Let's Link Up And Die"			2:33
9.	"UNCA / Composure"			3:25
10.	"Flyen"			3:34
11.	"The Troubles"			1:56
12.	"Crisis"			2:06
Total length:				29:39

== Personnel ==
Credits adapted from Apple Music.

- Glaive - songwriting, production
- Kurtains - songwriting, production
- Oliver Grasse - production (7)
- Ralph Castelli - mixing, mastering

== Release history ==
Release dates and formats for Jump Out
Region	Date	Format(s)	Edition	Label	Ref.
Worldwide	May 8, 2028	streaming	Standard	Atlantic Records; Motion Music	
Worldwide	May 25, 2026	LP	Standard	Atlantic Records; Motion Music	
