= Astrid (song) =

Single by Glaive

from the EP Cypress Grove
- Released: June 29, 2020
- Studio: Glaive's bedroom (Hendersonville, North Carolina)
- Length: 1:41
- Label: Self-released
- Songwriter: Ash Gutierrez
- Producer: FromTheHeart

Glaive singles chronology
"Sick" (2020)	"Astrid" (2020)	"Sticks" (2020)

Music video
- "Astrid" on YouTube

"Astrid" is a song by the American musician Glaive from his debut extended play (EP), Cypress Grove (2020). It was self-released on June 29, 2020, as the EP's lead single. Glaive performed, wrote, mixed, and mastered it in his bedroom in Hendersonville, North Carolina, with FromTheHeart handling its production. The track was half-inspired by real life experiences that Glaive had with a girl.

"Astrid" is an emo-leaning track built around a guitar line, electronics, a footwork-sounding programmed kick drum, and pitched-up vocals. A love song with a slurred vocal delivery, its lyrics are centered around teenage angst and youthful problems. "Astrid" received critical approval upon its release; Noisey and The Fader deemed it one of the best songs of 2020. A music video directed by Charlie Grant and Hunter Ray Barker premiered on February 17, 2021, and depicts Glaive standing, surrounded by farm animals and a dancing girl.

== Background and release ==
At the start of the COVID-19 pandemic, Glaive began recording music in his bedroom. In June 2020, the talent manager Dan Awad discovered Glaive's song "Sick" and became his manager. On June 29, 2020, Glaive self-released "Astrid", the lead single from his debut extended play (EP), Cypress Grove. The track was followed by three other singles that appeared on Cypress Grove: "Pissed" on July 20, "Touchè" on October 29, and "Eyesore" on November 13. In October 2020, Glaive signed a record deal with Interscope Records, who released Cypress Grove on November 19; "Astrid" appears as its second track.

== Production and composition ==
Glaive recorded "Astrid" in his bedroom in Hendersonville, North Carolina. The track was performed, written, mixed, and mastered by Glaive, while FromTheHeart handled its production. The song was half-inspired by real life experiences that Glaive had with a girl. Her name is similar to Astrid; he decided not to include her real name in fear of getting sued. In an interview with The Line of Best Fit from June 2021, he said that he does not talk to the subject anymore, but "has her blessing, even if the lyrics 'kinda suck' from her perspective".

"Astrid"
The chorus of "Astrid" features Glaive's pitched-up vocals, a programmed kick drum, and electronics.

"Astrid" is 1 minute and 41 seconds long. It is an emo-leaning song built around a guitar line, electronics, a footwork-sounding programmed kick drum, and pitched-up vocals. It is an angsty love song with a minimal chorus; Glaive's vocal performance is slurred. The song opens with the line, "Yeah you look so pretty in that dress, but I'd look better"; Cat Zhang for Pitchfork called the song's opening "slightly provocative" and The Fader's Colin Joyce called it "clever wordplay". Its lyrics are centered around teenage angst, playful romances, and portray youths dealing with problems in the world. The song's opening guitar riff transitions into the chorus, circles back, and fizzes out by the song's conclusion. Derrick Rossignol from Uproxx described "Astrid" as sounding like a song by 100 gecs "but poppier and less aggressive", while Robbin Murray of Clash called it a "100 second long rule-breaking discourse". Joyce said it "sounds like an American Football track played back at the wrong speed".

== Critical reception ==
"Astrid" received critical approval. Joyce said it "show[s] just how accomplished [Glaive] already is as a songwriter". Sophie Leigh Walker from The Line of Best Fit named it Glaive's "defining single", while Alex Robert Ross of The Fader lauded it for being an "expertly crafted emo-leaning [song]". The Los Angeles Times's Mikael Wood said it "carr[ies] sweet, shapely melodies nearly as catchy as those on Top 40 radio". Murray said the song is "splattered with fresh ideas" and wrote that "none of it makes any sense but you wind up completely caught up in its cavalcade of outstanding ideas". Following its release, the song was used in fan-made anime music videos published to YouTube.

"Astrid" was included in multiple critical lists of the best songs of 2020. The staff from Noisey deemed it the third best song of the year; Joyce described it as "restless" and said it has a "vibrant creativity" in a time when that is hard to come by. The Fader considered it the sixth best song of the year; Ross wrote that the track "burns like a sparkler" and "has one of the best opening lines of any song this year". Jon Caramanica of The New York Times mentioned it in his list of the year's best songs. The singer-songwriter Lana Del Rey posted the track's music video to one of her Instagram stories. Retrospectively, Joyce said the song "quickly became important texts for a new generation of always-online pop musicians and fans".

== Music video ==
Charlie Grant and Hunter Ray Barker directed the music video for "Astrid", which premiered on February 17, 2021. The video depicts Glaive surrounded by a herd of goats and alpacas, standing with his arms outstretched. The video also includes a dancing girl that was compared to the character Cassie Ainsworth from the television series Skins by Frankie Dunn of i-D. Murray called the video "the best introduction to Glaive's world".
