= Then I'll Be Happy (EP) =

2021 EP by Glaive and Ericdoa

EP by Glaive and Ericdoa
- Released: October 6, 2021
- Recorded: 2021
- Studio: Airbnb homestay (North Carolina); Undisclosed studio
- Length: 15:22
- Label: Interscope; Listen to the Kids
- Producer: Ericdoa; Cashheart; FortuneSwan; Glasear; Kidicarus; Kimj; Lunamatic; Nick Mira; Mochila; Tim Randolph; Whethan

Glaive chronology
All Dogs Go to Heaven (2021)	Then I'll Be Happy (2021)	Old Dog, New Tricks (2022)

Ericdoa chronology
COA (2020)	Then I'll Be Happy (2021)	Things with Wings (2022)

Singles from Then I'll Be Happy
- 1. "Cloak n Dagger" Released: January 21, 2021; 2. "Fuck This Town" Released: July 9, 2021

Then I'll Be Happy is a collaborative extended play (EP) by the American musicians Glaive and Ericdoa. It was released by Interscope Records and Listen to the Kids on October 6, 2021. After becoming leaders of both the hyperpop and digicore genres, the frequent collaborators recorded the EP at an Airbnb homestay in North Carolina and a studio. It experiments with sounds beyond the hyperpop genre, and contains lyrics that are written as angsty aphorisms. The EP was produced by Whethan with contributions from a variety of record producers including Ericdoa and Nick Mira. Then I'll Be Happy was promoted with two singles—"Cloak n Dagger" and "Fuck This Town"—and the Then I'll Be Happy Tour across North America. It received mixed reviews from critics, who cited the lack of chemistry between the duo.

== Background and recording ==
Glaive and Ericdoa are both considered rising stars in the digicore genre; The Fader's Alex Robert Ross called Glaive "the most promising kid in pop music" and Sophie Leigh Walker of The Line of Best Fit considered Ericdoa a digicore pioneer. They are also best friends and frequent collaborators. They recorded part of Then I'll Be Happy at an Airbnb homestay in North Carolina during January 2021, as well as a studio. The first track for the EP was recorded on January 2, 2021. The lead single, "Cloak n Dagger", was recorded in one day at the homestay. The second single, "Fuck This Town", was created the second time the duo had met each other in person. It is the first hook that they wrote together.

Ericdoa developed the idea for the artwork of Then I'll Be Happy, which is equally split down the middle into two parts, with Ericdoa and Glaive wearing black and white clothes respectively. They are placed in front of a contrasting background reminiscent of a yin and yang symbol. Glaive took Ericdoa shopping for a pair of Doc Martens shoes for the first time to wear in the cover.

== Composition ==
Mano Sundaresan from Pitchfork believed the EP "rarely sounds like hyperpop" and said the middle stretch of the EP sounds like "paint-by-numbers pop songs". He further wrote that "the guitars swing into EDM drops and the drum patterns switch up almost obsessively". According to the Chicago Reader's Leor Galil, Glaive typically prefers Midwest emo guitars mixed with energetic electronic production, while Ericdoa usually favors dreamy synthesizers and sharp hip hop beats. As singers, they share a similar emotional tone and trembling vocals, as well as a "nasally shout". The duo writes in angsty aphorisms, according to Sundaresan.

The opening track is "Naturale", which showcases Glaive and Ericdoa's chemistry as well as how they handle life after gaining fame. The following song, "Mental Anguish", sees the duo harmonizing its title during the hook, which was compared by Sundaresan to moments from Ericdoa's album COA (2020). Steve "Flash" Juon from RapReviews wrote that "Heather" contains "electronic production", "artificial drums", "vocoded vocals", tempo changes, and "whiny complaints". Sundaresan said that "Pretending" concludes with a "bizarre" fade out and it sounds like "Big Time Rush karaoke". "Physs" is followed by "Handle Me". The penultimate track "Cloak n Dagger" is about removing a toxic person from your life. Pitchfork's Alphonse Pierre called it a "two-sided lovesick anthem". Sundaresan thought that the final track, "Fuck This Town", contains "darker, dancier rhythms" and a "perfectly dejected chorus mixed so that it flashes like strobe lights over the drums". Galil described it as a "skewed-pop anthem". Writing about the previous two songs, Sundaresan said they are "thoughtful genre explorations that subvert norms instead of succumbing to them".

== Release and reception ==
Professional ratings
Review scores
Source	Rating
Pitchfork	5.5/10
RapReviews	4/10

Then I'll Be Happy's lead single, "Cloak n Dagger", was released alongside its music video on January 21, 2021, to celebrate Glaive's 16th birthday. It was followed by "Fuck This Town" and its music video on July 9, 2021. The EP was released by Interscope Records and Listen to the Kids on October 6, 2021. Glaive and Ericdoa embarked on the Then I'll Be Happy Tour across North America with support from Prentiss, Aldn, Underscores, and Midwxst throughout October and November 2021.

Sundaresan said that Then I'll Be Happy is "frustratingly safe and directionless" and that while Glaive and Ericdoa are captivating solo artists, they "aren't yet distinct enough to complement each other in interesting ways". Galil believed the duo does not "play off each other as much as you might hope" and though they are leaders of the hyperpop movement, "they sometimes fall short of that movement's kaleidoscopic energy". In a negative review, Juon believed that "Fuck This Town" "could exceed the cliches of the [emo rap] genre", but said it "mimics the tropes of the genre to the point of becoming parody". He concluded by saying the best things about the EP are that "the songs and [sic] short and the album is short". Sundaresan and Galil both named "Cloak n Dagger" and "Fuck This Town" as standout tracks.

== Track listing ==
Then I'll Be Happy track listing
No.	Title	Writer(s)	Producer(s)	Length
1.	"Naturale"	Ash Gutierrez; Eric Lopez; Alain Cartaya; Rickie Rodriguez; Ethan Snoreck	Ericdoa; FortuneSwan; Mochila; Whethan	1:15
2.	"Mental Anguish"	Gutierrez; Lopez; Cartaya; Tim Randolph; Snoreck	Mochila; Randolph; Whethan	1:54
3.	"Heather"	Gutierrez; Lopez; Jaehyun Kim; John Ong; Snoreck	Glasear; Kimj; Whethan	1:51
4.	"Pretending"	Gutierrez; Lopez; Ong; Snoreck; Eric Wood	Glasear; Lunamatic; Whethan	1:38
5.	"Physs"	Gutierrez; Lopez; Cartaya; Nick Mira; Ong; Rodriguez; Snoreck	FortuneSwan; Glasear; Mira; Mochila; Whethan	2:27
6.	"Handle Me"	Gutierrez; Lopez; Cashheart; Kidicarus; Kim; Ong; Snoreck	Cashheart; Glasear; Kidicarus; Kimj; Whethan	2:13
7.	"Cloak n Dagger"	Gutierrez; Lopez; Zac Greer; Kim; Ong; Snoreck	Glasear; Kimj; Whethan	2:09
8.	"Fuck This Town"	Gutierrez; Lopez; Kim; Ong; Snoreck	Glasear; Kimj; Whethan	1:55
Total length:				15:22

Notes

- All tracks are stylized in lowercase.

== Personnel ==
Credits adapted from Tidal.

Musicians

- Glaive – vocals (all tracks)
- Ericdoa – vocals (all tracks)
- Lunamatic – guitar (4)

Production

- Glaive – recording (7, 8), songwriting (all tracks)
- Ericdoa – recording (7, 8), production (1), songwriting (all tracks)
- Prash "Engine-Earz" Mistry – mixing (all tracks), mastering (7)
- Whethan – mixing (7), recording (7, 8), songwriting (all tracks), production (all tracks)
- Glasear – mixing (7), recording (7, 8), songwriting (3–8), production (3–8)
- Kimj – mixing (7), recording (7, 8), songwriting (3, 6–8), production (3, 6–8)
- FortuneSwan – songwriting (1, 5), production (1, 5)
- Mochila – songwriting (1, 2, 5), production (1, 2, 5)
- Tim Randolph – songwriting (2), production (2)
- Lunamatic – songwriting (6), production (4)
- Nick Mira – songwriting (5), production (5)
- Cashheart – songwriting (6), production (6)
- Kidicarus – production (6), songwriting (6), programming (6)

== Release history ==
Region	Date	Format(s)	Label	Ref.
Various	October 6, 2021	Streaming; digital download	Interscope; Listen to the Kids	
