= All Dogs Go to Heaven (EP) =

- Standard cover

EP by Glaive
- Released: August 6, 2021
- Studio: Studio in Los Angeles
- Length: 17:06
- Label: Interscope
- Producer: Bak; Travis Barker; Cashheart; D-Work; Delto; Glasear; Zac Greer; Haan; Hagan; Jasper Harris; Jeff Hazin; Kidicarus; Kimj; Lunamatic; Nick Mira; Whethan

Glaive chronology
Cypress Grove (2020)	All Dogs Go to Heaven (2021)	Then I'll Be Happy (2021)

Singles from All Dogs Go to Heaven
- 1. "I Wanna Slam My Head Against the Wall" Released: March 17, 2021; 2. "Detest Me" Released: June 2, 2021; 3. "Bastard" Released: July 29, 2021

All Dogs Go to Heaven is the second extended play (EP) by the American musician Glaive. It was released on August 6, 2021, via Interscope Records. After recording his debut EP Cypress Grove (2020) in his North Carolina bedroom, Glaive garnered critical acclaim and travelled to Los Angeles to record All Dogs Go to Heaven in a studio during a two-week period. The EP pulls from many genres, as Glaive was focused on making music that he liked and wanted to move away from his previous hyperpop sound.

The title of All Dogs Go to Heaven was taken from a book of the same name, which Glaive's mother gave him after the death of his family's dog. Production was handled by a variety of record producers, including Travis Barker, Jasper Harris, Nick Mira, and Whethan. It was promoted with three singles and a deluxe edition titled Old Dog, New Tricks; the deluxe was promoted with a North American tour. The EP received mixed reviews from critics; NME ranked it among the best EPs and mixtapes to release in 2021 and multiple publications included its lead single, "I Wanna Slam My Head Against the Wall", on their year-end lists.

== Background and recording ==
Glaive released his debut extended play (EP), Cypress Grove, in November 2020. It gained him a global fanbase and received widespread critical acclaim; The Fader's Alex Robert Ross said it positioned Glaive as "the most promising kid in pop music" and called him "a naturally gifted songwriter". Though Glaive is categorized as a hyperpop artist, Cypress Grove pulls from multiple other genres. In August 2021, Glaive performed his first live show at Cole Bennett's Summer Smash festival.

While Cypress Grove was recorded in his bedroom, Glaive travelled to Los Angeles to record his next EP, All Dogs Go to Heaven, in a studio across a two-week period with Travis Barker and Nick Mira. After making around 20 songs during the recording period, he had to narrow it down to seven "perfect" ones. During recording sessions, Glaive was assertive in moving away from the hyperpop sound of his previous EP. The EP's title was taken from a book of the same name, which Glaive's mother gave him after the death of his family's dog. When Glaive had ideas, he would write them in the Notes app to turn them into songs later. He wanted to make music that he liked instead of trying to sound like another artist. Before traveling to Los Angeles, he made a few songs for the EP in his bedroom that did not make the final track list.

== Composition ==
=== Overview ===
Though Glaive is an influential hyperpop musician, NME's Ben Jolley wrote that All Dogs Go to Heaven "extend[s] far beyond the hyperpop umbrella". Maxamillion Polo of Ones to Watch said the EP contains "fragments of Midwest emo, emo rap, alternative, Jersey bounce, PC Music, and pop-punk". Ross called the EP "hooky, but deft" and said that it pulls from genres such as "Midwest emo, arena pop, and SoundCloud rap". Glaive described the production as a middle ground between trap and EDM and called the EP energetic. Unlike his earlier music, All Dogs Go to Heaven does not feature pitched-up vocals.

=== Songs ===
The opening track of All Dogs Go to Heaven is "1984", a hyperpop song that also draws from rock, trap, and EDM. The track meanders and then moves to an intensified pace. It tells a bittersweet story with heartbroken lyrics over a trap-heavy chorus. Gray said that Glaive puts on a "Post Malonian tremble-moan", while Curtis Sun of Consequence described Glaive's delivery as "quavering". "Detest Me" is an upbeat pop song that consists of "blown-out drums, snares and a dolphin-like flute" that come together chaotically. The angst-ridden "Poison" contains a drawn-out enunciation of the word "escape" during its hook, and Jolley described it as "a fusion of trap-meets-pop-punk". The production of "Stephany" and "Synopsis" consist of "sticky riffs and thrashing drums" according to Jolley. Gray called the latter "bumping" and "screeching" and wrote that Glaive is at his most "compelling and genuine" on the track.

"I Wanna Slam My Head Against the Wall", a song about declining serotonin levels and Glaive's crush that loves alcohol, contains frenetic and maximalist hyperpop production. Gray wrote that it is "deceptively chipper", while Sophie Leigh Walker of The Line of Best Fit said it is "all sunshine and rainbows on the surface" and conceals "universal angst". The New York Times's Jon Caramanica wrote that the track "tilts between breathability and gasping," contains "squirrelly production", and called its lyrics "sweetly sung agony". Glaive said the inspiration behind the track was online school and quarantine. The penultimate track, "Bastard", begins with a guitar progression and transitions to a beat drop as xylophone notes support Glaive's "raging post-breakup emotions". The closing track, "All Dogs Go to Heaven", was described as "a relatively slow-burning ballad" by Derrick Rossignol of Uproxx. The deluxe edition of All Dogs Go to Heaven, titled Old Dog, New Tricks, also contains the tracks "Lap #1", "Icarus", "JustLikeU4TheImage", "Walking Around with No Hands", and "Prick".

== Promotion and release ==
Glaive announced All Dogs Go to Heaven alongside the release of its lead single "I Wanna Slam My Head Against the Wall" and its music video on March 17. The second single, "Detest Me", was released on June 2, 2021, alongside a music video. On July 29, 2021, he released the third and final single, "Bastard". The EP was released on August 6, 2021, via Interscope Records. During August 2021, "1984" received a music video directed by Cole Bennett.

A deluxe edition of All Dogs Go to Heaven, titled Old Dog, New Tricks, was released on January 27, 2022. It added five new songs to the EP, including the single "Prick". During February 2022, Glaive embarked on a North American tour with Aldn and Midwxst to support Old Dog, New Tricks. It was his first tour as a headliner.

On July 19, 2022, Glaive shared a GoFundMe for the dog featured on the EP's cover named Binkus. Binkus had the condition pulmonic stenosis and required $7,500 to treat the condition.

== Critical reception ==
Professional ratings
Review scores
Source	Rating
NME	5/5 stars
Pitchfork	6.3/10

According to Raphael Helfand of The Fader, All Dogs Go to Heaven received mixed reviews. In a perfect review for NME, Ben Jolley wrote that the EP "is a huge step up" for Glaive, showcases "genuine depth to his songwriting", and "proves that his appeal will soon transcend the relatively niche hyperpop scene". In a lukewarm review for Pitchfork, Julia Gray wrote that Glaive's natural talent is hidden under "amorphous" production and said the EP is "polished, near spotless, and that's the problem". NME included All Dogs Go to Heaven in their list of the best EPs and mixtapes of 2021 and named "I Wanna Slam My Head Against the Wall" as a key track.

Several publications included "I Wanna Slam My Head Against the Wall" in their best songs of 2021 lists. The New York Times's Jon Caramanica considered it the best song of the year; he applauded it for being an "evolutionary leap" for Glaive and said it is "more tense than a tug of war and more fun than a loop-the-loop". The Los Angeles Times ranked it the year's 27th best song, while Slate included it in their unranked list. Similarly, The Fader considered "Bastard" the 47th best song of the year.

== Track listing ==
All Dogs Go to Heaven track listing
No.	Title	Writer(s)	Producer(s)	Length
1.	"1984"	Ash Gutierrez; Nicholas Mira; Ethan Snoreck	Mira; Whethan	2:30
2.	"Detest Me"	Gutierrez; Alexander Walter Bak; Jasper Harris; Hagan Lange; Subhaan Rahman; Snoreck	Bak; Haan; Harris; Lange; Whethan	1:58
3.	"Poison"	Gutierrez; Jeff Hazin; Snoreck	Hazin; Whethan	2:16
4.	"Stephany"	Gutierrez; Hazin	Hazin	1:57
5.	"Synopsis"	Gutierrez; Travis Barker; Jaehyun Kim; Snoreck; Eric Revel Wood; Devin Workman	Barker; D-Work; Kimj; Whethan	2:03
6.	"I Wanna Slam My Head Against the Wall"	Gutierrez; Cashheart; Kidicarus; Kim; John Ong; Snoreck	Cashheart; Glasear; Kidicarus; Kimj; Whethan	1:56
7.	"Bastard"	Gutierrez; Xavier Deltomme; Snoreck; Wood	Delto; Lunamatic; Whethan	2:03
8.	"All Dogs Go to Heaven" (outro)	Gutierrez; Hazin; Kim; Zac Greer	Hazin; Kimj; Greer	2:57
Total length:				17:06

Old Dog, New Tricks track listing
No.	Title	Writer(s)	Producer(s)	Length
9.	"Lap #1"	Gutierrez; Rupert Howarth	Perto	2:07
10.	"Icarus"	Gutierrez; Nick Ferraro; Hazin	Ferraro; Hazin	1:56
11.	"JustLikeU4TheImage"	Gutierrez; Howarth	Perto	1:57
12.	"Walking Around with No Hands"	Gutierrez; Barker; Andrew Goldstein; Snoreck	Barker; Goldstein; Whethan	2:01
13.	"Prick"	Gutierrez; Howarth	Perto	2:14
Total length:				27:21

Notes

- All tracks are stylized in lowercase.

== Personnel ==
Credits adapted from Tidal.

- Glaive – recording (2, 4, 6, 8), engineering (3, 5, 7)
- Prash Mistry – mixing, mastering, engineering (1, 4, 5, 8)
- Whethan – recording (1), engineering (2, 3, 5, 6)
- Kimj – recording (8), engineering (5, 6)
- Jeff Hazin – recording (4, 8), engineering (3)
- Cashheart – engineering (6)
- Zac Greer – guitar, recording (8)
- Kidicarus – engineering (6)
- D-Work – engineering (5)
- Nick Mira – recording (1)
- Glasear – engineering (6)
- Travis Barker – drums, engineering (5)
- Haan – engineering (2)
- Eric J Dubowsky – engineering (7)
- Matt Curtin – additional engineering (7)

== Release history ==
Region	Date	Format(s)	Label	Edition	Ref.
Various	August 6, 2021	Streaming; digital download	Interscope	Original	
Various	January 27, 2022	Streaming; digital download; LP	Interscope	Deluxe	
