= Cypress Grove (EP) =

EP by Glaive
- Released: November 19, 2020
- Studio: Glaive's bedroom (Hendersonville, North Carolina)
- Genre: Art pop
- Length: 13:33
- Label: Interscope
- Producer: Glaive; Brakence; Delto; FromTheHeart; Jeff Hazin; Coleman Slaughter

Glaive chronology
Cypress Grove (2020)	All Dogs Go to Heaven (2021)

Singles from Cypress Grove
- 1. "Astrid" Released: June 29, 2020; 2. "Pissed" Released: July 20, 2020; 3. "Touché" Released: October 29, 2020; 4. "Eyesore" Released: November 13, 2020

Cypress Grove is the debut extended play (EP) by the American musician Glaive. It was released by Interscope Records on November 19, 2020. After recording music in his bedroom at the start of the COVID-19 pandemic, Glaive became a leading force of the hyperpop genre and signed a deal with Interscope in October 2020. Classified as an art pop release, Cypress Grove pulls from multiple genres. It was recorded in Glaive's childhood bedroom in Hendersonville, North Carolina, and was named after a street in North Carolina. Cypress Grove gained Glaive a global fanbase and received widespread critical acclaim; several publications featured its lead single "Astrid" on their year-end lists of the best songs of the year.

== Background and release ==
At the start of the COVID-19 pandemic, Glaive began recording music in his bedroom. During June 2020, the talent manager Dan Awad discovered Glaive's song "Sick" and became his manager. Soon after, Glaive regularly appeared on Spotify's "Hyperpop" playlist, became a leading force in the hyperpop genre, and major record labels immediately became interested in him. In October 2020, he signed a deal with Interscope Records. In July 2020, he was included in Complex's list of the best new artists of July. They wrote that "Glaive is a natural songwriter with a gift for structure and melody" and that it would be easy to see his sound become more common in the mainstream. Cypress Grove was recorded in a week in Glaive's childhood bedroom in Hendersonville, North Carolina. The EP was named after a street in North Carolina. When making the songs, he would work in his bedroom on a beat and vocal layering. He would reach out to his friends online when he needed help with a guitar part in a song. Once he finished a song, he would show it to his mother and his close friend to hear their feedback. Cypress Grove was released by Interscope Records on November 19, 2020.

== Composition ==
Cypress Grove pulls from multiple genres. Colin Joyce of The Fader described the EP as "collection of messy art-pop miniatures". Pitchfork's Cat Zhang said that it "is less 'hyper' and more 'pop'" and incorporates "Midwest emo guitar melodies and pop-punk angst". Carrie Battan of The New Yorker called it "polished" and wrote that it pulls sounds from alternative rock, hip hop, electronic, and pop music. AllMusic's Paul Simpson said it contains "upbeat melodies" and called it genre fluid. Glaive called the EP indie pop and romantic.

Cypress Grove contains seven tracks. Its opening track is "Eyesore", a song about what it is like to be a teenager that wants to avoid attention. The Fader's Alex Robert Ross said it is one of Glaive's "poppier" songs and contains "a synth line that would fit just as well on Katy Perry as it might on contemporaries like OSQuinn". The following "Astrid" is a desperate love song that Derrick Rossignol of Uproxx said sounds like 100 gecs "but poppier and less aggressive". Joyce said it "sounds like an American Football track played back at the wrong speed". The track is built around a guitar line and contains "glittering" electronics, a footwork-sounding kick drum, pitched-up melodies, and a minimal chorus. "DND" is a Midwest emo-inspired hyperpop song that targets the people who started talking to Glaive only after he began making music. "Touché" is written about the discomfort and bitterness of adolescence. When writing about "Hey Hi HYD", Pitchfork's Julia Gray said Glaive got away with the song's title "due to the force of his charisma rather than his age". Mikael Wood of the Los Angeles Times wrote that the penultimate "2009" contains "sweet" and "shapely melodies nearly as catchy as those on Top 40 radio". The closing track "Pissed" presents Glaive singing about being irritated in an unaffected tone over a chiptune beat.

== Reception ==
Cypress Grove gained Glaive a global fanbase and, according to Tyler Damara Kelly of The Line of Best Fit, it received widespread critical acclaim. Writing for The Fader, Ross said the EP positioned Glaive "as the most promising kid in pop music" and called him "a naturally gifted songwriter". Writing for the same website, Joyce said it "is self-possessed and confident in a way that makes it easy to forget his age". In a review of Glaive's 2021 EP All Dogs Go to Heaven for Pitchfork, Gray retrospectively called Cypress Grove "an impressive snapshot of modern adolescence". Pitchfork also included it in their list "31 Great Records You May Have Missed: Winter 2021". Zhang called it "an easy pleasure" and thought that "no quarantine hobbyist has had a trajectory quite like Glaive".

Cypress Grove's lead single "Astrid" was met with critical approval. It was named as the third best song of 2020 by Noisey. Joyce called the track a "burst of adolescent angst, fluttering flirtations, and colorful character studies of various lost youths". He also wrote that the track shows "vibrant creativity" in a time when that is hard to come by. The track was named the sixth best track of 2020 by The Fader's staff. Ross wrote that the track "burns like a sparkler" and "has one of the best opening lines of any song this year". It was also mentioned in Jon Caramanica of The New York Times's list of the best songs of 2020. The singer-songwriter Lana Del Rey posted the track's music video to her Instagram story.

== Track listing ==
Cypress Grove track listing
No.	Title	Writer(s)	Producer(s)	Length
1.	"Eyesore"	Ash Gutierrez; Jeff Hazin; Matt Kahane	Hazin	2:10
2.	"Astrid"	Gutierrez	FromTheHeart	1:41
3.	"DND"	Gutierrez; Hazin	Hazin	2:17
4.	"Touché"	Gutierrez; Randy Findell	Brakence	1:52
5.	"Hey Hi HYD"	Gutierrez	Glaive; Coleman Slaughter	1:56
6.	"2009"	Gutierrez; Hazin	Hazin	1:50
7.	"Pissed"	Gutierrez	Delto	1:47
Total length:				13:33

Notes

- All tracks are stylized in lowercase.
- "DND" stands for "do not disturb".
- "HYD" in "Hey Hi HYD" stands for "how you doing".

== Personnel ==
Credits adapted from Tidal.

- Ash Gutierrez – songwriting, production (5), mastering (2, 7), mixing (2, 4, 5, 7), recording (5, 7), engineering (5, 7)
- Prash Mistry – mastering (1, 3, 5, 6)
- Jeff Hazin – songwriting (1, 3, 6), production (1, 3, 6), mixing (1, 3, 6)
- Matt Kahane – songwriting (1)
- FromTheHeart – production (2)
- FortuneSwan – production (2)
- Valentine – production (2)
- Randy Findell – songwriting (4), production (4)
- Coleman Slaughter – production (5)
- Delto – production (7)

== Release history ==
Release dates and format(s) for Cypress Grove
Region	Date	Format(s)	Label	Ref.
Various	November 19, 2020	Streaming; digital download; LP	Interscope	
