= Dazegxd =

American producer and DJ (born 2002)

- Born: April 19, 2002 (age 24); Canarsie, Brooklyn, New York
- Genres: Jungle; deep house; UK garage
- Years active: 2019–present
- Label: DeadAir
- Website: www.dazegxd.com

Dazegxd (born April 19, 2002) is an American producer and DJ. He was a prominent figure in the early digicore scene and contributed to the 2020s jungle music revival. He has released three studio albums, vKiSS (2022), Girls Love Jungle (2023), and Exhibition Mode (2024), after signing with deadAir Records.

== Early life ==
Dazegxd was born on April 19, 2002, in Canarsie, Brooklyn. He is of Jamaican and Ghanaian descent. He became interested in the trance, jungle, and house genres through listening to the in-game radio station from Grand Theft Auto III as a middle schooler and by playing Jet Set Radio, which led him to begin making music in his bedroom starting when he was eleven years old. His mother also frequently played reggae and dancehall, while his father played traditional Ghanaian music and hip hop.

== Career ==
Dazegxd began creating "neon rap" beats when he was fifteen before switching to instrumental electronic music. He released his first mixtape, Daze's Game!, in 2019. Dazegxd had met producer gum.mp3 online in 2020 and they released their first song together, "every waking moment", that year. He was offered a spot on the internet collective EldiaNYC in August 2021 and officially joined in April 2022.

Dazegxd released his debut studio album, vKiSS, on May 20, 2022, through deadAir Records. On April 26, 2023, he released a collaborate EP with quinn, dSX.fm. His second album, Girls Love Jungle, was released in collaboration with gum.mp3 on August 18, 2023, and it was followed on June 21, 2024, with his third album, Exhibition Mode, Dazegxd later supported Jane Remover on her 2025 Turn Up or Die Tour and her 2026 Live Exhibit Tour.

== Influences and artistry ==
Regarding Dazegxd's debut album, vKiSS, The Fader described his music as "playful" and prioritizing "fluidity and vibrancy". His music ranges various dance genres, including jungle, garage house, R&B, drum and bass, and Jersey club. Dazegxd has stated that he was influenced by the Moving Shadow label, late-night East Coast radio, anime and video game soundtracks, and talking drums. He had also created a mascot for his music, which he dubbed "Dazegirl".

== Discography ==
=== Studio albums ===
Title	Details
vKiSS	Released: May 20, 2022; Label: deadAir Records; Formats: Cassette, CD, digital download
Girls Love Jungle (with gum.mp3)	Released: August 18, 2023; Label: Gum Studio; Formats: LP, CD, digital download
Exhibition Mode	Released: June 21, 2024; Label: deadAir Records; Formats: CD, digital download

=== Mixtapes ===
Title	Details
Daze's Saga	Released: April 21, 2020; Label: Self-released; Formats: Digital download
Daze's Game 3!	Released: May 5, 2021; Label: deadAir Records; Formats: Digital download
##extra zone	Released: December 29, 2021; Label: eldia; Formats: Digital download

=== Extended plays ===
Title	Details
xAKYN_ep	Released: September 25, 2020; Label: eldia; Formats: Digital download
d&db.nfo (with gum.mp3)	Released: November 7, 2020; Label: eldia, halcyon; Formats: Digital download
d&db2.iso (with gum.mp3)	Released: February 11, 2021; Label: Duetti; Formats: Digital download
##s2	Released: April 4, 2021; Label: eldia; Formats: Digital download
emodaze3k	Released: May 15, 2021; Label: eldia; Formats: Digital download
##extra zone 2	Released: July 12, 2022; Label: eldia; Formats: Digital download
dSX.fm (with quinn)	Released: April 26, 2023; Label: deadAir Records; Formats: Digital download
Gospel Overture (with MON)	Released: October 6, 2023; Label: Gum Studio; Formats: Digital download

=== Compilations ===
Title	Details
dazecore + vKiSS sampler	Released: April 1, 2022; Label: Self-released; Formats: CD
dazecore sampler no. 2 + i guess im 20 now + vKiSS selections	Released: 2022; Label: Self-released; Formats: CD
dazecore sampler #3	Released: 2022; Label: Self-released; Formats: CD
dazecore sampler: finale (special exhibition mode)	Released: October 7, 2022; Label: Self-released; Formats: CD
dazecore sampler #5: anniversary edition	Released: 2023; Label: Self-released; Formats: CD
dazecore sampler: just the remixes	Released: June 19, 2023; Label: Self-released; Formats: CD
dazecore sampler #7: ultimate edition	Released: January 19, 2024; Label: Self-released; Formats: CD
