= Ericdoa =

American musician

ericdoa
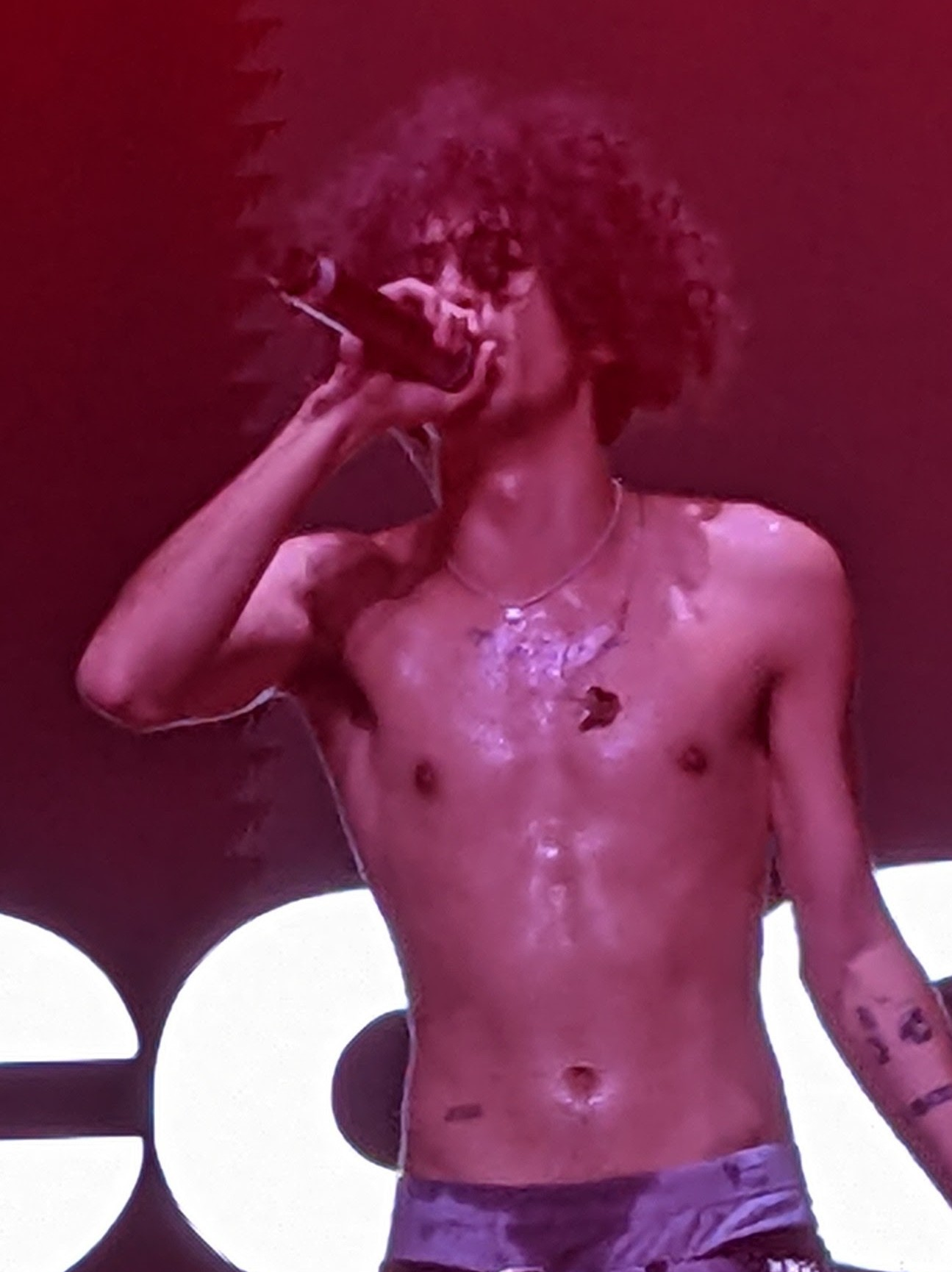
- ericdoa performing in November 2022
- Born: Eric George Lopez; September 7, 2002 (age 24); Monroe, Connecticut, U.S.
- Musical career
- Also known as: Dante Red, Avon Hill 2004, deerlover46, killeric
- Genres: Hyperpop; pop; digicore
- Occupations: Singer; songwriter; rapper; record producer
- Instruments: Vocals, Guitar
- Years active: 2018–present
- Labels: Listen to the Kids; Santa Anna; Interscope; (former)
- Website: ericdoa.com

Eric George Lopez (born September 7, 2002), known professionally as Ericdoa (stylized in all lowercase), is an American singer-songwriter, rapper, and record producer. Initially presenting a hyperpop/digicore sound, he began releasing music as killeric in 2018 and released his debut extended play (EP), DOA, in June 2019. Ericdoa's debut studio album, COA, was released in November 2020. His second studio album, Things with Wings, was released in 2022 and supported by his first headlining tour. His third studio album, DOA, was released in 2024. His fourth studio album, Música Divino, was released on November 13, 2026. Sources mostly describe Lopez's musical style as hyperpop.

== Early life and career ==
Eric George Lopez was born on September 7, 2002, in Monroe, Connecticut. He is of Panamanian-Puerto Rican descent. As a child, Lopez was given his first guitar by his grandfather. He started recording his own music and releasing it on sites such as SoundCloud under the name killeric. Eric released his debut EP DOA in 2019. Lopez would change his stage name to Ericdoa in mid-2019 and would release his debut mixtape, Public Target (2019), and his debut studio album, COA (2020). Lopez signed with Interscope Records in 2021. He released a number of singles throughout 2021 and early 2022, including "Fantasize", "Back N Forth", "Strangers", "Fool4Love" and "Lifeline". "Sad4Whattt" was included on the second season soundtrack of the HBO drama series Euphoria. Lopez has also frequently collaborated with Glaive, releasing several singles as well as the EP Then I'll Be Happy in 2021. Lopez's second album, Things with Wings, was announced for release in May 2022 alongside an international headlining tour. It was later released on May 20, 2022.

After a nine-month hiatus, Lopez released a new single titled ">One" (pronounced "greater than one") on March 5, 2023, in collaboration with Riot Games and Valorant. On September 22, he released the single "Kickstand", his first solo song since the release of Things with Wings; a music video accompanied the track. On November 3, he released another single, "Dancinwithsomebawdy", which also received a music video. On January 19, 2024, he released his third studio album, DOA. A clip from his 2-hour live stream went viral as a sound on TikTok, in which he referenced American online streamer Ninja while improvising the line "Imagine if Ninja got a low taper fade". As a response to the meme, Ninja eventually got the low taper fade hair cut, while simultaneously referencing the meme continuously after its initial virality, calling it "still massive", which became a meme of Ninja "dragging" the low taper fade meme. The meme is famous because its popularity didn't fade for over a year. Lopez would later depart from Interscope Records. He expressed on a podcast how he was unhappy about the label forcing him to make an extended play (EP) with American musician Glaive. When asked if he would work on another musical project with Glaive, he commented, "But the thing is though I don't want it to be some shit where it's like a corporate like "you guys are gonna make songs because that shit did awesome last time! We can make you guys do the biggest thing in the world!" that shit is so fucking lame". After his departure, Lopez went on to do a 24/7 livestream to make an EP. Three months after the livestream ended, Eric would release the project, titled "Why Suffer For Us?" via Listen to the Kids and Santa Anna.

== Musical style ==
While frequently described as a leading hyperpop and digicore artist, Lopez has stated that he is hesitant to place his music within a specific genre. He stated to Vice Media that "I think for people who aren't very well-versed in music it's just a cushion to fall back on [...] Instead of genre-less music, they have something to call it." According to The New Yorker, Lopez's musical style might be more accurately described as "hyper-rap".

== Discography ==
Studio albums

- COA (2020)
- Things with Wings (2022)
- DOA (2024)
- Música Divino (2026)
