= List of songs recorded by Oliver Tree =

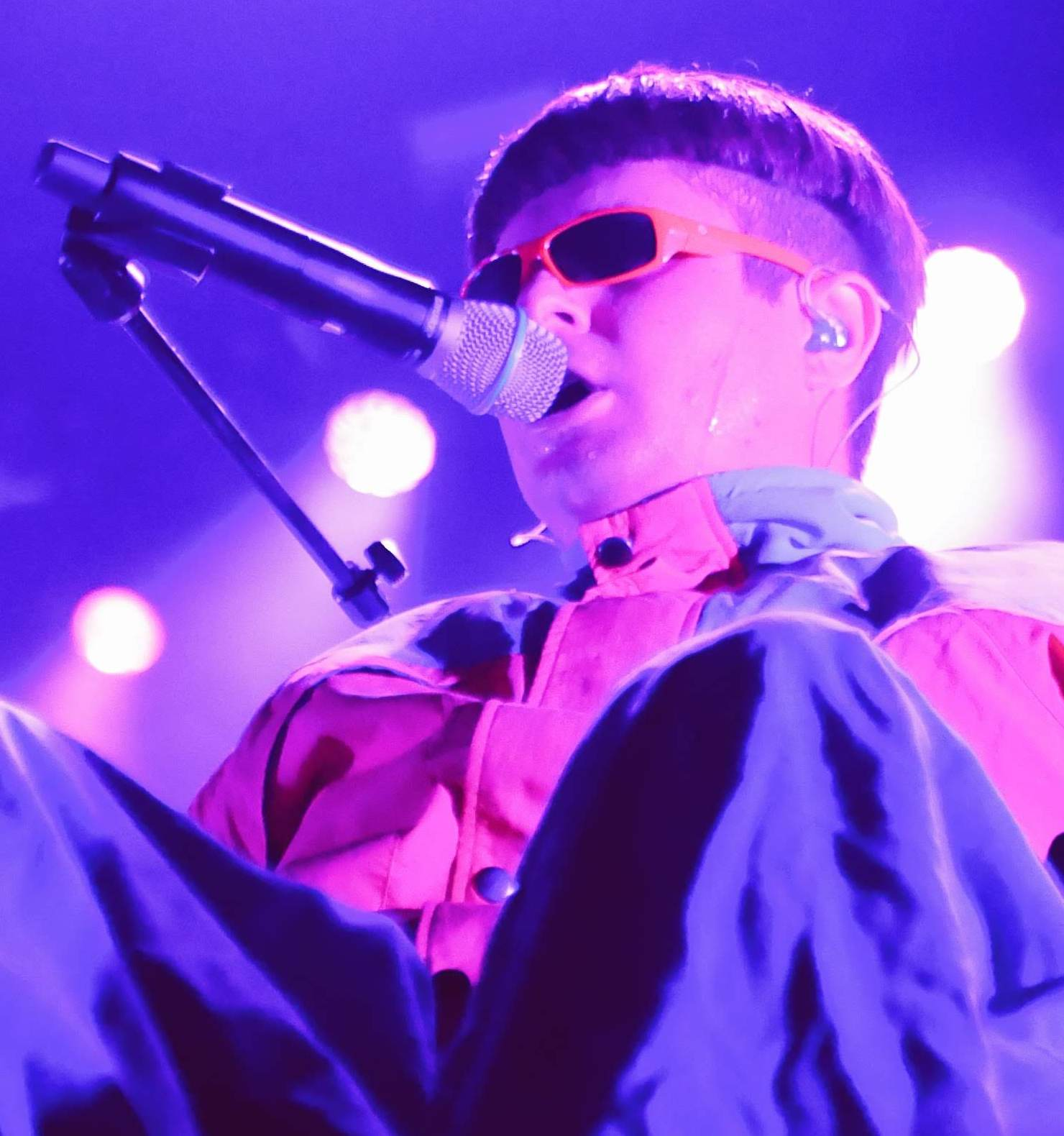
Oliver Tree performing in September 2019

American singer-songwriter Oliver Tree (1993–2026) recorded songs for four studio albums and four extended plays (EP), alongside guest features for other artists.

In 2013, Tree self-released the album Splitting Branches under his middle name and the EP Demons later the same year on Apollo Records. After signing to Atlantic Records in 2017, Tree released his debut major-label EP Alien Boy (2018), which was followed by the EP Do You Feel Me? in August 2019. The title track was a collaboration with Whethan, who had previously collaborated with Tree on the singles "When I'm Down", "All You Ever Talk About" and "Enemy", as well as co-writing many of his songs.

His debut studio album, Ugly Is Beautiful, was issued in July 2020 after being delayed due to the COVID-19 pandemic, with a deluxe version featuring the hit single "Life Goes On" released the following year. Musically, the album was described by critics as an electropop, hip-hop, pop-punk, and alternative rock effort. Despite claiming retirement, in September 2021, Tree released the collaborative EP Welcome to the Internet with Russian rave band Little Big. His second studio album, the country-influenced Cowboy Tears, was released in February 2022. This was followed by his third studio album, Alone in a Crowd, released on September 2023 and featuring the hit Robin Schulz collaboration "Miss You" as a bonus track.

== Songs ==
Key
| ‡ | Indicates songs written solely by Oliver Tree |

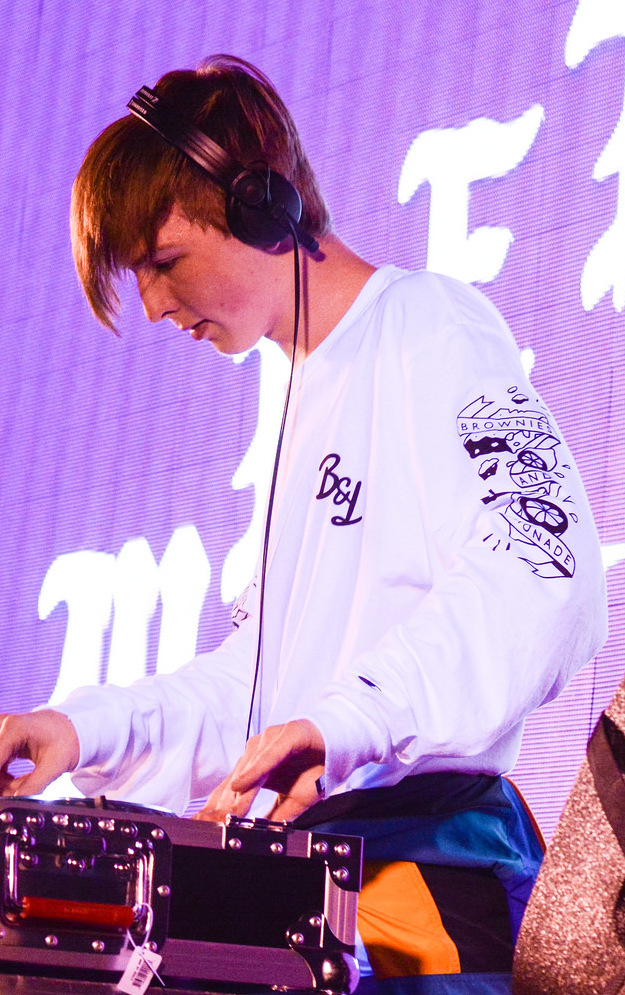
Whethan collaborated on and co-wrote many of Tree's songs.

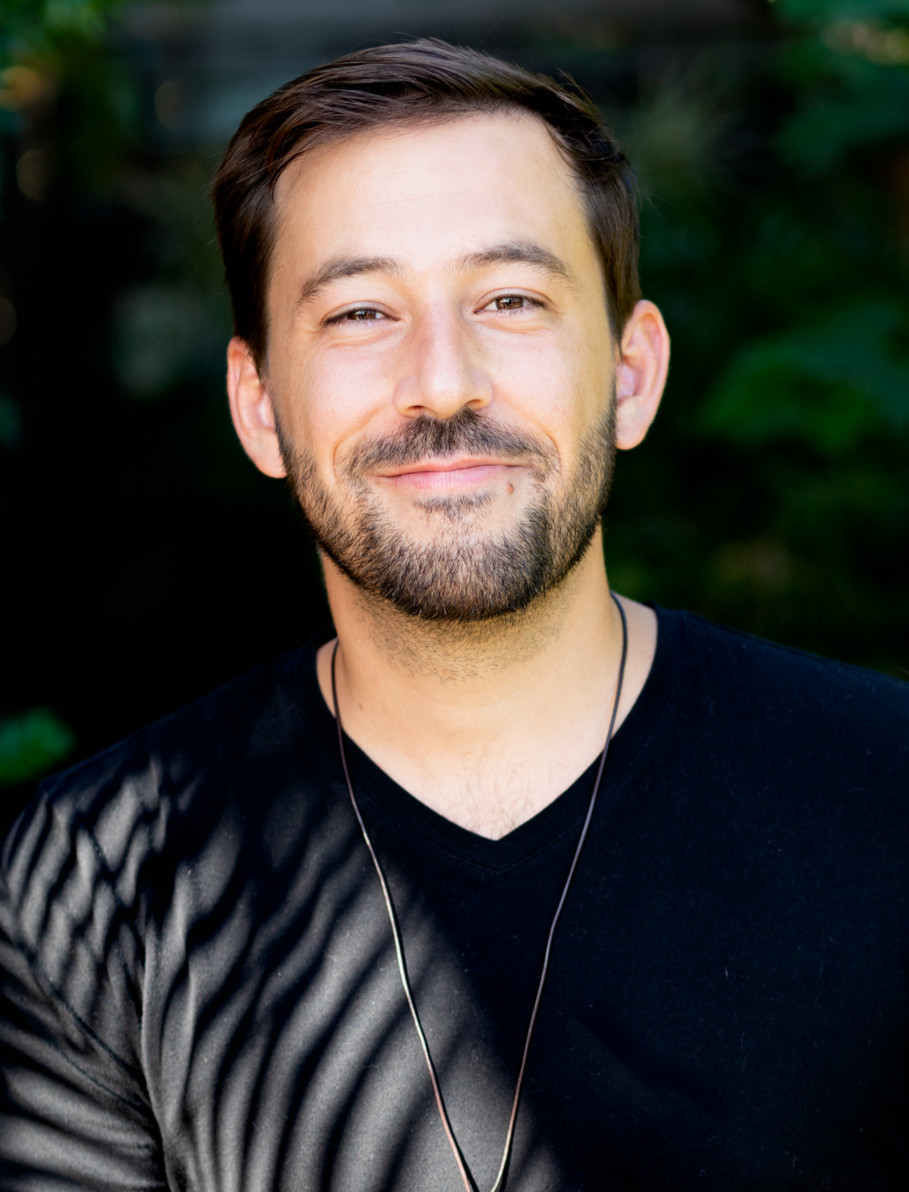
David Pramik co-wrote and produced four songs on Tree's album Ugly Is Beautiful.

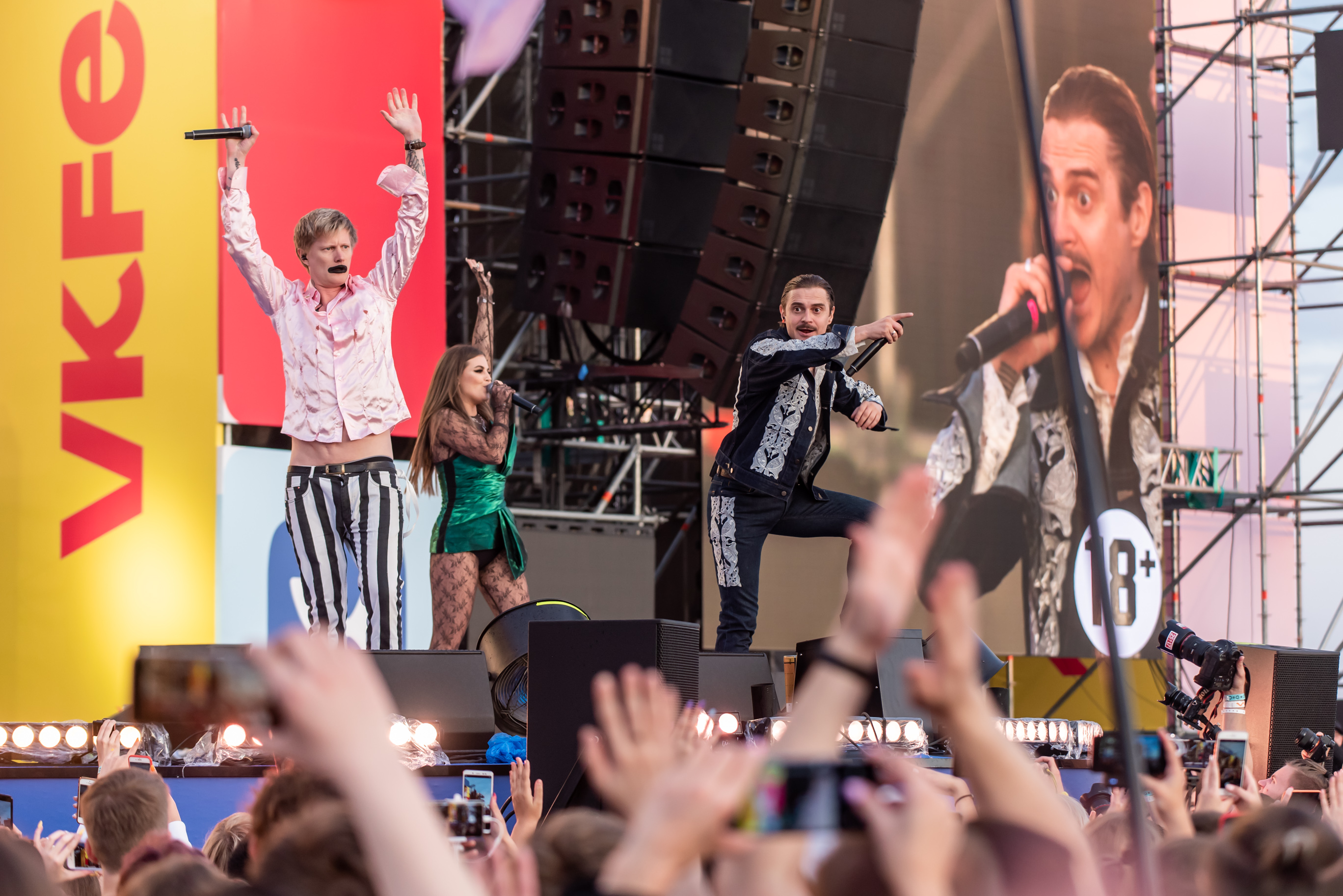
Tree collaborated with Little Big on the EP Welcome to the Internet.

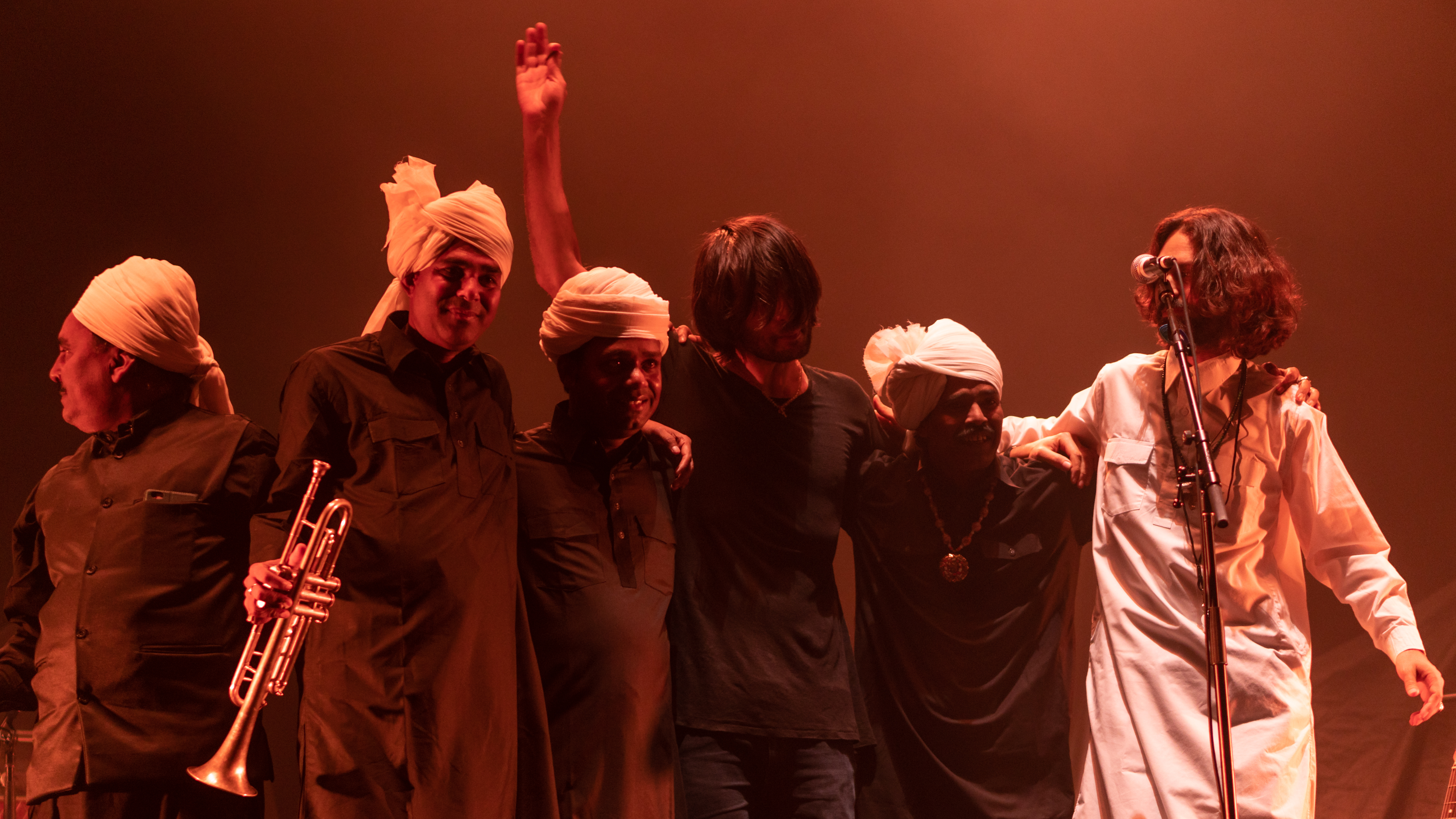
Tree covered Radiohead's "Karma Police".

Name of song, featured performers, writer(s), original release, and year of release
| Song | Artist(s) | Writer(s) | Original release | Year | Ref. |
|---|---|---|---|---|---|
| "1993" | Oliver Tree featuring Little Ricky ZR3 | Oliver Tree Nickell; Ethan Snoreck; Ricky Robinson; Casey Mattson | Ugly Is Beautiful | 2020 | |
| "A-Okay" | Oliver Tree | Oliver Tree | Cowboy Tears Drown the World in a Swimming Pool of Sorrow | 2022 | |
| "Again & Again" | Oliver Tree | Oliver Tree Nickell; Josh Ocean | Ugly Is Beautiful | 2020 | |
| "Alien Boy" (Note: Also included on Ugly Is Beautiful (2020).) | Oliver Tree | Oliver Tree Nickell; Imad-Roy El-Amine; Casey Mattson | Alien Boy and Do You Feel Me? | 2018 | |
| "All Bets Are Off" | Oliver Tree | Oliver Tree Nickell; Ethan Snoreck | Do You Feel Me? Madden NFL 20 (Soundtrack) | 2019 | |
| "All You Ever Wanted" | Oliver Tree | Oliver Tree | Love You Madly Hate You Badly | 2026 | |
| "All I Got" | Oliver Tree | Oliver Tree Nickell; Jesse Cole Nickell IV; Ethan Snoreck | Alien Boy | 2017 | |
| "All in All" | Oliver Tree | Oliver Tree Nickell; Dylan Wiggins; Casey Mattson | Ugly Is Beautiful: Shorter, Thicker & Uglier | 2021 | |
| "All You Ever Talk About" | Whethan and Oliver Tree | Oliver Tree Nickell ‡ | Non-album single | 2017 | |
| "Artemecia" | Tree featuring Shelf Nunny and Kirsten Rosenberg | Oliver Tree Nickell; Kirsten Rosenberg; Shelf Nunny | Splitting Branches | 2013 | |
| "Asshole" | Lil Yachty featuring Oliver Tree | Oliver Tree | Lil Boat 3.5 | 2020 | |
| "Balloon Boy" | Oliver Tree | Oliver Tree Nickell; Ethan Snoreck; Casey Mattson | Cowboy Tears | 2022 | |
| "Battleship" | Oliver Tree | Oliver Tree | Cowboy Tears Drown the World in a Swimming Pool of Sorrow | 2022 | |
| "Bounce" | Oliver Tree | Oliver Tree | Alone in a Crowd | 2023 | |
| "Bury Me Alive" | Oliver Tree | Oliver Tree Nickell; William Zaire Simmons; Trevor Brown | Ugly Is Beautiful | 2020 | |
| "California" | Oliver Tree | Oliver Tree Nickell; Ethan Snoreck; Casey Mattson | Cowboy Tears | 2022 | |
| "Cash Machine" (Note: A remix featuring Dillon Francis and Grandson was released in September 2020 as a non-album single.) | Oliver Tree | Oliver Tree Nickell; David Pramik; Ethan Snoreck | Ugly Is Beautiful | 2019 | |
| "Cheapskate" | Oliver Tree | Oliver Tree Nickell; Robert Koch | Non-album single | 2017 | |
| "Cigarettes" | Oliver Tree | Oliver Tree Nickell; Nick Long; Travis Barker | Cowboy Tears | 2022 | |
| "Cowboy Tears" | Oliver Tree | Oliver Tree Nickell; Christopher Comstock | Cowboy Tears | 2022 | |
| "Cowboys Don't Cry" | Oliver Tree | Oliver Tree Nickell; Ilan Rubin; Imad Royal | Cowboy Tears | 2022 | |
| "Crash Test Dummy" | Oliver Tree | Oliver Tree | Cowboy Tears Drown the World in a Swimming Pool of Sorrow | 2022 | |
| "Crazy" | Oliver Tree | Oliver Tree | Love You Madly Hate You Badly | 2026 | |
| "Death Ray" | Oliver Tree | Oliver Tree | Love You Madly Hate You Badly | 2026 | |
| "Deep End" | Oliver Tree | Oliver Tree | Love You Madly Hate You Badly | 2026 | |
| "Demons" | Tree featuring Beat Culture and Lena Kuhn | Oliver Tree Nickell; Sunik Kim | Demons | 2013 | |
| "Dirty" | Oliver Tree | Oliver Tree | Love You Madly Hate You Badly | 2026 | |
| "Do You Feel Me?" | Oliver Tree and Whethan | Oliver Tree Nickell; Ethan Snoreck | Do You Feel Me? | 2019 | |
| "Doormat" | Oliver Tree | Oliver Tree Nickell; Ethan Snoreck; Casey Mattson | Cowboy Tears | 2022 | |
| "Elevator to the Sky" | Oliver Tree | Oliver Tree | Alone in a Crowd | 2023 | |
| "Enemy" | Oliver Tree and Whethan | Oliver Tree Nickell; Ethan Snoreck | Alien Boy | 2017 | |
| "Essence" | Oliver Tree featuring Super Computer | Oliver Tree | Alone in a Crowd | 2023 | |
| "Every Type of Friend" | Oliver Tree | Oliver Tree Nickell; Ethan Snoreck | Ugly Is Beautiful: Shorter, Thicker & Uglier | 2021 | |
| "The Exploding Man" | Oliver Tree | Oliver Tree | Cowboy Tears Drown the World in a Swimming Pool of Sorrow | 2022 | |
| "Fairweather Friends" | Oliver Tree | Oliver Tree | Alone in a Crowd | 2023 | |
| "The First Night" | Oliver Tree | Oliver Tree | Alone in a Crowd | 2023 | |
| "Flowers" | Oliver Tree | Oliver Tree | Love You Madly Hate You Badly | 2026 | |
| "Forget It" | Getter featuring Oliver Tree | Oliver Tree | Radical Dude! | 2016 | |
| "Freaks & Geeks" | Oliver Tree | Oliver Tree Nickell; Ethan Snoreck; Casey Mattson | Cowboy Tears | 2022 | |
| "Freefall" | Whethan featuring Oliver Tree | Oliver Tree | Fantasy | 2020 | |
| "From Reds to Blues" | Tree featuring Aeropsia | Oliver Tree Nickell; Aeropsia | Splitting Branches | 2013 | |
| "Fuck" | Oliver Tree | Oliver Tree Nickell; Ethan Snoreck; Harry Rodrigues | Non-album single | 2019 | |
| "Fuck the Whole World" | Oliver Tree | Oliver Tree | Love You Madly Hate You Badly | 2026 | |
| "Get Well Soon" | Oliver Tree | Oliver Tree Nickell; Ethan Snoreck; Casey Mattson | Cowboy Tears | 2022 | |
| "Glow On" | Oliver Tree | Oliver Tree | Love You Madly Hate You Badly | 2026 | |
| "Halo" | Oliver Tree | Oliver Tree | Love You Madly Hate You Badly | 2026 | |
| "Here We Go Again" | Oliver Tree | Oliver Tree | Non-album single | 2023 | |
| "Hey Shorty" | Oliver Tree | Oliver Tree | Love You Madly Hate You Badly | 2026 | |
| "Highlight of My Life" | Oliver Tree | Oliver Tree | Alone in a Crowd | 2023 | |
| "How It Ends" | Oliver Tree | Oliver Tree | Love You Madly Hate You Badly | 2026 | |
| "Hurt" | Oliver Tree | Oliver Tree Nickell; Ethan Snoreck | Do You Feel Me? | 2018 | |
| "I Hate You" | Oliver Tree | Oliver Tree | Cowboy Tears Drown the World in a Swimming Pool of Sorrow | 2022 | |
| "I Need You" | Oliver Tree | Oliver Tree | Love You Madly Hate You Badly | 2026 | |
| "I'm Gone" | Oliver Tree | Oliver Tree Nickell; Dylan Wiggins | Ugly Is Beautiful | 2020 | |
| "The Internet" | Oliver Tree and Little Big | Oliver Tree Nickell; Sonya Taurskaya; Ilya Prusikin | Welcome to the Internet | 2021 | |
| "Introspective" | Oliver Tree | Oliver Tree Nickell; Andrew Goldstein | Ugly Is Beautiful | 2020 | |
| "Invisible Man" | Oliver Tree | Oliver Tree | Alone in a Crowd | 2023 | |
| "Jerk" | Oliver Tree | Oliver Tree Nickell; Christopher Comstock; David Pramik | Ugly Is Beautiful | 2020 | |
| "Joke's on You!" | Oliver Tree | Oliver Tree Nickell; Rogét Chahayed; Ajay Bhattacharyya | Ugly Is Beautiful | 2020 | |
| "Joyride" | Oliver Tree | Oliver Tree | Love You Madly Hate You Badly | 2026 | |
| "Karma Police" (cover) | Tree | Thomas Yorke; Jonny Greenwood; Edward O'Brien; Colin Greenwood; Philip Selway | Demons | 2013 | |
| "Let Me Down" | Oliver Tree | Oliver Tree Nickell; Ethan Snoreck; David Pramik | Ugly Is Beautiful | 2020 | |
| "Lies Came Out My Mouth" | Oliver Tree | Oliver Tree Nickell; Dylan Wiggins; Ethan Snoreck | Ugly Is Beautiful: Shorter, Thicker & Uglier | 2021 | |
| "Life Goes On" (Note: A remix featuring Ty Dolla Sign was released in November 2021 as a non-album single. Another remix featuring Ski Mask the Slump God and Trippie Redd was released in December 2021 alongside a music video.) | Oliver Tree | Oliver Tree Nickell; Tanner Petulla | Ugly Is Beautiful: Shorter, Thicker & Uglier | 2021 | |
| "Me, Myself & I" | Oliver Tree | Oliver Tree Nickell; Ethan Snoreck | Ugly Is Beautiful | 2020 | |
| "Mind Control" | Oliver Tree | Oliver Tree | Cowboy Tears Drown the World in a Swimming Pool of Sorrow | 2022 | |
| "Miracle Man" | Oliver Tree | Oliver Tree Nickell; David Pramik | Do You Feel Me? | 2019 | |
| "Miss You" | Oliver Tree with Robin Schulz | Oliver Tree | Alone in a Crowd | 2023 | |
| "Mr Regular" | What So Not featuring Oliver Tree and Killer Mike | Oliver Tree | Anomaly | 2022 | |
| "Movement" | Oliver Tree | Oliver Tree Nickell; Ethan Snoreck | Non-album single | 2018 | |
| "My Mind Is" | Nvdes featuring Oliver Tree | Oliver Tree | Life with Lobsters | 2016 | |
| "My Only Friend" | Oliver Tree | Oliver Tree | Love You Madly Hate You Badly | 2026 | |
| "Nothing's Perfect" | Nghtmre featuring Oliver Tree | Oliver Tree | Drmvrse | 2022 | |
| "One & Only" | Oliver Tree | Oliver Tree | Alone in a Crowd | 2023 | |
| "Out of Ordinary" | Oliver Tree | Oliver Tree Nickell; Casey Mattson; Ethan Snoreck | Ugly Is Beautiful: Shorter, Thicker & Uglier | 2021 | |
| "Oxymoron" | Oliver Tree | Oliver Tree | Cowboy Tears Drown the World in a Swimming Pool of Sorrow | 2022 | |
| "People" | Tree featuring Shelf Nunny and Lena Kuhn | Oliver Tree Nickell; Lena Kuhn | Splitting Branches | 2013 | |
| "Placeholder" | Oliver Tree | Oliver Tree | Cowboy Tears Drown the World in a Swimming Pool of Sorrow | 2022 | |
| "Playing with Fire" | Oliver Tree | Oliver Tree Nickell; John Hill; Ethan Snoreck | Cowboy Tears | 2022 | |
| "Pumpidup" | Lorenzo featuring Oliver Tree | Oliver Tree | Sex in the City | 2019 | |
| "Rampampam" | Oliver Tree and Little Big | Oliver Tree Nickell ‡ | Welcome to the Internet | 2021 | |
| "Replacement" | Oliver Tree | Oliver Tree | Cowboy Tears Drown the World in a Swimming Pool of Sorrow | 2022 | |
| "Revival" | Tree featuring Kirsten Rosenberg | Oliver Tree Nickell; Kirsten Rosenberg | Splitting Branches | 2013 | |
| "Running" | Nvdes featuring Oliver Tree | Oliver Tree | Vibe City Utah | 2018 | |
| "Sacred Elements" | Tree featuring Finn Rivera | Oliver Tree Nickell; Finn Rivera | Splitting Branches | 2013 | |
| "Sideways" | Oliver Tree | Oliver Tree | Love You Madly Hate You Badly | 2026 | |
| "Sick of U" | BoyWithUke featuring Oliver Tree | Oliver Tree | Non-album single | 2022 | |
| "Smile" | Oliver Tree | Oliver Tree | Alone in a Crowd | 2023 | |
| "Someone Else" | Oliver Tree | Oliver Tree | Love You Madly Hate You Badly | 2026 | |
| "Star" | Oliver Tree | Oliver Tree | Alone in a Crowd | 2023 | |
| "Strangers" | Oliver Tree | Oliver Tree | Alone in a Crowd | 2023 | |
| "Stuck Down the Wrong Rabbit Hole" | Tree featuring Beat Culture and Lena Kuhn | Oliver Tree Nickell; Sunik Kim | Demons | 2011 | |
| "Suitcase Full of Cash" | Oliver Tree | Oliver Tree Nickell; Nick Long; Travis Barker | Cowboy Tears | 2022 | |
| "Sunshine" | Oliver Tree | Oliver Tree | Cowboy Tears Drown the World in a Swimming Pool of Sorrow | 2022 | |
| "Superhero" | Oliver Tree | Oliver Tree | Love You Madly Hate You Badly | 2026 | |
| "Swimmer's Delight (SOS)" | Oliver Tree | Oliver Tree Nickell; Casey Mattson; Ethan Snoreck | Ugly Is Beautiful: Shorter, Thicker & Uglier | 2021 | |
| "Swing & a Miss" | Oliver Tree | Oliver Tree Nickell; John Hill; Ethan Snoreck; Casey Mattson | Cowboy Tears | 2022 | |
| "Things We Used to Do" | Oliver Tree | Oliver Tree Nickell; John Hill | Cowboy Tears | 2022 | |
| "This Is Separation" | Tree featuring Shelf Nunny | Oliver Tree Nickell ‡ | Splitting Branches | 2013 | |
| "Tully" (Note: Stylized in all lowercase.) | Tree featuring Shelf Nunny and Kirsten Rosenberg | Oliver Tree Nickell ‡ | Splitting Branches | 2013 | |
| "Turn It Up" | Oliver Tree and Little Big featuring Tommy Cash | Oliver Tree Nickell; Ilya Prusikin; Sonya Taurskaya; Tomas Tammemets | Welcome to the Internet | 2021 | |
| "Ugly Side" | Oliver Tree | Oliver Tree | Alone in a Crowd | 2023 | |
| "Ultraman" | Oliver Tree with Diplo | Oliver Tree | Non-album single | 2023 | |
| "Universal" | Tree featuring Ariel Thiermann | Oliver Tree Nickell ‡ | Splitting Branches | 2013 | |
| "Upside Down" | Oliver Tree | Oliver Tree Nickell; Casey Mattson; Josh Ocean | Alien Boy | 2018 | |
| "The Villain" | Oliver Tree | Oliver Tree Nickell; Ilan Rubin; Imad Royal | Cowboy Tears | 2022 | |
| "Voices" | KSI featuring Oliver Tree | Oliver Tree | Non-album single | 2023 | |
| "Warrior" | Tree featuring Kirsten Rosenberg | Oliver Tree Nickell; Kirsten Rosenberg | Splitting Branches | 2013 | |
| "Waste My Time" | Oliver Tree | Oliver Tree Nickell; Ajay Bhattacharyya | Ugly Is Beautiful | 2020 | |
| "Wasteland" | Oliver Tree | Oliver Tree | Cowboy Tears Drown the World in a Swimming Pool of Sorrow | 2022 | |
| "Welcome to LA" | Oliver Tree | Oliver Tree Nickell; Jacob Mehlman; Ethan Snoreck | Alien Boy | 2017 | |
| "When I'm Down" | Whethan and Oliver Tree | Oliver Tree Nickell; Ethan Snoreck | Non-album single | 2016 | |
| "When You're Around" | Oliver Tree | Oliver Tree Nickell; David Pramik | Ugly Is Beautiful: Shorter, Thicker & Uglier | 2021 | |
| "With You" | Oliver Tree | Oliver Tree | Alone in a Crowd | 2023 | |
| "You're Not There" | Oliver Tree and Little Big | Oliver Tree Nickell ‡ | Welcome to the Internet | 2021 | |

== See also ==
- Oliver Tree discography
