= Oliver Tree discography =

Recordings and works by Oliver Tree

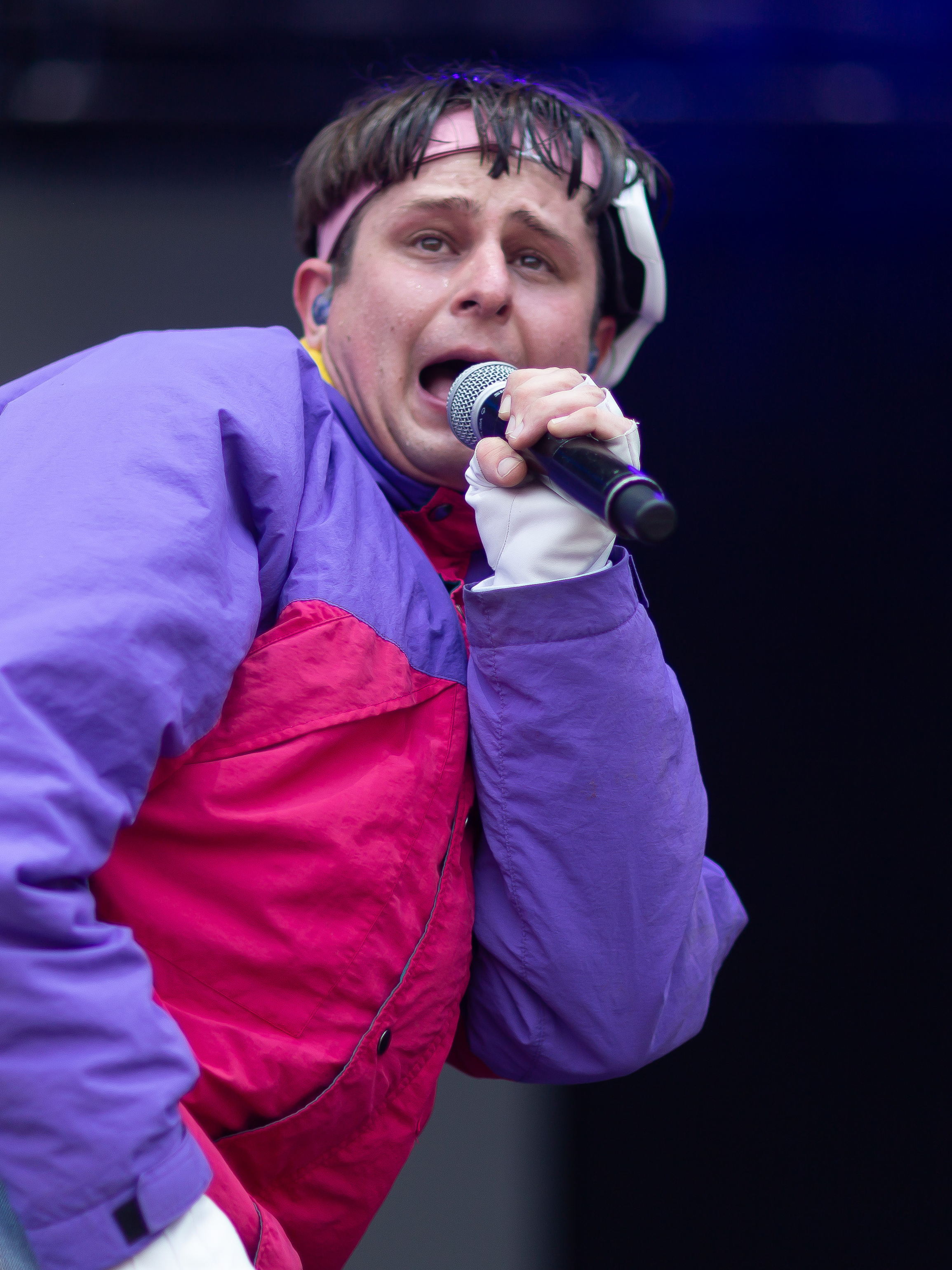
- Tree performing at Laneway Festival 2020
- Studio albums: 4
- EPs: 3
- Singles: 34
- Music videos: 30
- Independent albums: 1
- Independent EPs: 1

American singer-songwriter Oliver Tree released four major label studio albums, three extended plays, 44 singles—thirty-four as a lead artist and ten as a featured artist. He also independently released one album and EP under the name "Tree" in 2013.

Throughout his career, Tree released the albums Ugly Is Beautiful (2020), Cowboy Tears (2022), and Alone in a Crowd (2023); and less than two months following the release of his fourth studio album, Love You Madly Hate You Badly (2026), he died in a mid-air collision in Rio de Janeiro, Brazil on June 14.

== Studio albums ==
List of studio albums, with release date, record label, formats, selected chart positions, and certifications shown
Title	Details	Peak chart positions									Certifications
Title	Details	US	US Alt.	US Rock	AUS	AUT	CAN	IRE	NZ	UK	Certifications
Ugly Is Beautiful	Released: July 17, 2020; Label: Atlantic Records; Format: LP, cassette, digital download, streaming	14	1	1	23	51	47	38	28	32	RIAA: Gold; BPI: Silver; MC: Platinum; RMNZ: Gold
Cowboy Tears	Released: February 18, 2022; Label: Atlantic; Format: CD, LP, cassette, digital download, streaming	60	7	7	67	—	91	—	—	— (Note: Cowboy Tears did not enter the UK Albums Chart, but peaked at number 74 on the UK Albums Downloads Chart and 27 on the Official Record Store Chart.)	
Alone in a Crowd	Released: September 29, 2023; Label: Atlantic; Format: CD, LP, digital download, streaming	143	18	—	88	—	—	—	—	— (Note: Alone in a Crowd did not enter the UK Albums Chart, but peaked at number 61 on the UK Albums Sales Chart and 64 on the Physical Albums Chart.)	
Love You Madly Hate You Badly	Released: April 24, 2026; Label: Alien Boy; Format: Digital download, streaming	—	—	—	— (Note: Love You Madly Hate You Badly did not enter the ARIA Albums Chart, but peaked at number 25 on the ARIA Digital Album Chart.)	—	—	—	—	— (Note: Love You Madly Hate You Badly did not enter the UK Albums Chart, but peaked at number 96 on the UK Albums Downloads Chart.)	
"—" denotes a recording that did not chart or was not released in that territory.

=== Independent albums ===
List of studio albums, with release date and track listings shown
Title	Album details
Splitting Branches (as Tree)	Released: February 17, 2013; Label: Self-released; Formats: Digital download; Track listing: 1. "People" (featuring Lena Kuhn and Shelf Nunny); 2. "Tully" (featuring Kirsten Rosenberg and Shelf Nunny); 3. "Artemecia" (featuring Kirsten Rosenberg and Shelf Nunny); 4. "Revival" (featuring Kirsten Rosenberg); 5. "From Reds to Blues" (featuring Aeropsia); 6. "Warrior" (featuring Kirsten Rosenberg); 7. "This Is Separation" (featuring Shelf Nunny); 8. "Universal" (featuring Ariel Thiermann); 9. "Sacred Elements" (featuring Finn Rivera)

== Extended plays ==
List of extended plays, with release date, record label, formats, selected chart positions, and certifications shown
Title	Details	Peak chart positions	
Title	Details	US Alt.	US Heat.
Demons (as Tree)	Released: August 12, 2013; Label: Apollo; Format: 12" EP, digital download	—	—
Alien Boy EP	Released: February 16, 2018; Label: Atlantic; Format: 12" EP, digital download, streaming,	—	—
Do You Feel Me?	Released: August 2, 2019; Label: Atlantic; Format: Digital download, streaming	21	16
Welcome to the Internet (with Little Big)	Released: September 30, 2021; Label: Atlantic; Format: Digital download, streaming	—	—
"—" denotes a recording that did not chart or was not released.

== Singles ==
=== As lead artist ===
List of singles as lead artist, with year released, selected chart positions, certifications, and album details shown
Title	Year	Peak chart positions										Certifications	Album
Title	Year	US	US Alt.	US Rock	AUS	CAN	IRE	NOR	SWE	UK	WW	Certifications	Album
"When I'm Down" (with Whethan)	2016	—	—	—	—	—	—	—	—	—	—	RIAA: Gold	Non-album singles
"All You Ever Talk About" (with Whethan)	2017	—	—	—	—	—	—	—	—	—	—		Non-album singles
"All I Got" / "Welcome to LA"	2017	—	—	—	—	—	—	—	—	—	—		Alien Boy
"Cheapskate"	2017	—	—	—	—	—	—	—	—	—	—		Non-album single
"Enemy" (with Whethan)	2017	—	—	—	—	—	—	—	—	—	—		Alien Boy
"Upside Down"	2018	—	—	—	—	—	—	—	—	—	—		Alien Boy
"Alien Boy"	2018	—	—	22	—	—	—	—	—	—	—	RIAA: Platinum; BPI: Silver; MC: Platinum; RMNZ: Gold	Alien Boy (Note: "Alien Boy" also appears on Do You Feel Me? and Ugly Is Beautiful.)
"Movement"	2018	—	—	—	—	—	—	—	—	—	—		Non-album single
"Hurt"	2018	—	4	11	—	—	—	—	—	—	—	RIAA: Platinum; MC: Gold	Do You Feel Me? (Note: "Hurt" also appears on Ugly Is Beautiful)
"Fuck"	2019	—	—	—	—	—	—	—	—	—	—		Non-album single
"Miracle Man"	2019	—	—	22	—	—	—	—	—	—	—	RIAA: Gold	Do You Feel Me? (Note: "Miracle Man" also features on Ugly Is Beautiful.)
"Cash Machine"	2019	—	—	13	—	—	—	—	—	—	—		Ugly Is Beautiful
"Let Me Down"	2020	—	26	9	—	—	—	—	—	—	—	RIAA: Gold	Ugly Is Beautiful
"Bury Me Alive"	2020	—	—	34	—	—	—	—	—	—	—		Ugly Is Beautiful
"Let Me Down" (remix featuring Blink-182)	2020	—	—	—	—	—	—	—	—	—	—		Non-album single
"Out of Ordinary"	2021	—	—	—	—	—	—	—	—	—	—		Ugly Is Beautiful: Shorter, Thicker & Uglier
"Life Goes On"	2021	71	27	7	34	46	33	14	63	33	26	RIAA: Platinum; BPI: Silver; MC: Platinum; RMNZ: Platinum	Ugly Is Beautiful: Shorter, Thicker & Uglier
"Turn It Up" (with Little Big featuring Tommy Cash)	2021	—	—	—	—	—	—	—	—	—	—		Welcome to the Internet
"Cowboys Don't Cry"	2022	—	28	18	—	—	—	—	—	—	—		Cowboy Tears
"Freaks & Geeks"	2022	—	—	—	—	—	—	—	—	—	—		Cowboy Tears
"I Hate You"	2022	—	—	—	—	—	—	—	—	—	—		Cowboy Tears Drown the World in a Swimming Pool of Sorrow
"Placeholder"	2022	—	—	—	—	—	—	—	—	—	—		Cowboy Tears Drown the World in a Swimming Pool of Sorrow
"Miss You" (with Robin Schulz)	2022	84	—	—	4	28	2	3	21	3	11	RIAA: Platinum; ARIA: 2× Platinum; BPI: Platinum; MC: 2× Platinum; RMNZ: 2× Platinum	Alone in a Crowd
"Here We Go Again" (with David Guetta)	2023	—	—	—	—	—	—	—	— (Note: "Here We Go Again" did not enter the Swedish Singellista Chart, but peaked at number 14 on the Swedish Heatseeker Chart.)	—	—		Non-album single
"Bounce"	2023	—	—	—	—	—	—	—	—	—	—		Alone in a Crowd
"One & Only"	2023	—	—	—	—	—	—	—	—	—	—		Alone in a Crowd
"Essence" (featuring Super Computer)	2023	—	—	—	—	—	—	—	—	—	—		Alone in a Crowd
"Fairweather Friends"	2023	—	—	—	—	—	—	—	—	—	—		Alone in a Crowd
"Ultraman" (with Diplo)	2024	—	—	—	—	—	—	—	—	—	—		Non-album single
"Superhero"	2025	—	—	—	—	—	—	—	—	—	—		Love You Madly Hate You Badly
"Joyride"	2025	—	—	—	—	—	—	—	—	—	—		Love You Madly Hate You Badly
"Flowers"	2026	—	—	—	—	—	—	—	—	—	—		Love You Madly Hate You Badly
"Deep End"	2026	—	—	—	—	—	—	—	—	—	—		Love You Madly Hate You Badly
"All You Ever Wanted"	2026	—	—	—	—	—	—	—	—	—	—		Love You Madly Hate You Badly
"—" denotes a recording that did not chart or was not released.

=== As featured artist ===
List of singles as featured artist, with year released, selected chart positions, certifications, and album details shown
Title	Year	Peak chart positions								Album
Title	Year	US Rock	FRA	IRE	UK	UK Down.	UK Phys.	UK Sales	UK Strm.	Album
"My Mind Is" (Nvdes featuring Oliver Tree)	2016	—	—	—	—	—	—	—	—	Life with Lobsters
"Forget It" (Getter featuring Oliver Tree)	2016	—	—	—	—	—	—	—	—	Radical Dude!
"Running" (Nvdes featuring Oliver Tree)	2018	—	—	—	—	—	—	—	—	Vibe City Utah
"Pumpidup" (Lorenzo featuring Oliver Tree)	2019	—	62	—	—	—	—	—	—	Sex in the City
"Freefall" (Whethan featuring Oliver Tree)	2020	—	—	—	—	—	—	—	—	Fantasy
"Asshole" (Lil Yachty featuring Oliver Tree)	2020	—	—	—	—	—	—	—	—	Lil Boat 3.5
"Mr Regular" (What So Not featuring Oliver Tree and Killer Mike)	2022	—	—	—	—	—	—	—	—	Anomaly
"Nothing's Perfect" (Nghtmre featuring Oliver Tree)	2022	—	—	—	—	—	—	—	—	Drmvrse
"Sick of U" (BoyWithUke featuring Oliver Tree)	2022	30	—	—	—	—	—	—	—	Non-album single
"Voices" (KSI featuring Oliver Tree)	2023	—	—	27	11	6	1	2	21	Caught in Two Minds
"—" denotes a recording that did not chart or was not released.

== Music videos ==
List of music videos, with year released and director(s) shown
Title	Year	Director(s)
As lead artist
"All That" x "Alien Boy"	2018	Oliver Tree and RJ Sanchez
"Hurt"	2018	Oliver Tree and Brendan Vaughan
"Fuck"	2019	Oliver Tree
"Miracle Man"	2019	Oliver Tree
"Cash Machine'"	2019	Oliver Tree
"Let Me Down"	2020	Ryan Farber
"Bury Me Alive" (Official unofficial music video)	2020	Oliver Tree
"I'm Gone"	2020	Oliver Tree
"Life Goes On"	2021	Oliver Tree
"Turn It Up" (with Little Big featuring Tommy Cash)	2021	Alina Pasok, Oliver Tree and Ilya Prusikin
"The Internet" (with Little Big)	2021	Oliver Tree, Alina Pasok and Maxim Semyonov
"Life Goes On" (acoustic version)	2021	Oliver Tree
"Cowboys Don't Cry"	2022	Oliver Tree
"Freaks & Geeks"	2022	Oliver Tree
"Swing & a Miss"	2022	Oliver Tree
"Miss You" (with Robin Schulz)	2022	Oliver Tree
"Suitcase Full of Cash"	2022	Oliver Tree
"Here We Go Again" (with David Guetta)	2023	Oliver Tree
"Bounce"	2023	Oliver Tree
"One & Only"	2023	Oliver Tree
"Essence" (featuring Super Computer)	2023	Oliver Tree
"Fairweather Friends"	2023	Oliver Tree
"With You"	2023	Oliver Tree
"Superhero"	2025	Oliver Tree
"Joyride"	2025	Oliver Tree
"Flowers" (Official unofficial music video)	2026	Oliver Tree
"Flowers" (Lord Farquaad performance)	2026	Oliver Tree
"Deep End" (Limp Bizkit performance)	2026	Oliver Tree
"All You Ever Wanted" (Official unofficial music video)	2026	Oliver Tree
"F*ck the Whole World" (Korn live performance video)	2026	Oliver Tree
"All You Ever Wanted" (Medieval performance video)	2026	Oliver Tree
As featured artist
"Forget It" (Getter featuring Oliver Tree)	2016	Liam Underwood
"Running" (Nvdes featuring Oliver Tree)	2018	Parker Day
"Asshole" (Lil Yachty featuring Oliver Tree)	2021	Oliver Tree
"Sick of U" (BoyWithUke featuring Oliver Tree)	2022	None credited
"Worth Nothing" (Drift Music Video) (Twisted featuring Oliver Tree)	2022	None credited
"Worth Nothing" (Twisted featuring Oliver Tree)	2022	None credited
"Voices" (KSI featuring Oliver Tree)	2023	Oliver Tree

== See also ==
- List of songs recorded by Oliver Tree
