= Cowboy Tears =

Studio album by Oliver Tree
- Released: February 18, 2022
- Genres: Country; pop; pop rock
- Length: 34:30 (standard edition); 65:38 (deluxe edition)
- Label: Atlantic
- Producers: Casey Mattson; Ilan Rubin; Imad Royal; John Hill; Marshmello; Nick Long; Oliver Tree; Travis Barker; Whethan

Oliver Tree chronology
Welcome to the Internet (2021)	Cowboy Tears (2022)	Alone in a Crowd (2023)

Singles from Cowboy Tears
- 1. "Cowboys Don't Cry" Released: January 12, 2022; 2. "Freaks & Geeks" Released: February 3, 2022

Deluxe edition cover
- Cowboy Tears Drown the World in a Swimming Pool of Sorrow cover

Singles from Cowboy Tears (Deluxe)
- 1. "I Hate You" Released: May 20, 2022; 2. "Placeholder" Released: July 15, 2022

Professional ratings
Review scores
Source	Rating
AllMusic	3.5/5 stars
Pitchfork	4.8/10

Cowboy Tears is the second major-label album by American singer-songwriter Oliver Tree. The album was released on February 18, 2022, through Atlantic Records. A deluxe edition, Cowboy Tears Drown the World in a Swimming Pool of Sorrow, was released on December 23, 2022.

== Background ==
Prior to the announcement of Cowboy Tears, Tree had stated numerous times that his 2020 debut album Ugly Is Beautiful would be his last release as Oliver Tree and that after its release, he would be retiring from music. However, on June 27, 2021, he made an Instagram post stating that he had come out of retirement to record Cowboy Tears. On October 12, he announced the Cowboy Tears Tour, a North American headlining tour to support the album, which would begin on February 19, 2022. On January 12, 2022, he released the album's lead single "Cowboys Don't Cry" along with a music video starring actress Bella Thorne, and announced that Cowboy Tears would be released on February 18, with the album cover being revealed and preorders being launched. On February 3, the second single, "Freaks & Geeks", was released with a music video. On February 18, the same day as the album's release, the music video for "Swing & a Miss" was released. On May 20, Oliver Tree released the single "I Hate You", and began teasing a deluxe edition of Cowboy Tears. On July 15, another single from the deluxe edition, "Placeholder", was released. On August 9, Oliver Tree revealed in an interview that the deluxe edition would be titled Cowboy Tears Drown the World in a Swimming Pool of Sorrow, and that he had worked with Travis Barker on the project. On December 15, he announced on Instagram that the deluxe edition would be released on December 23. On December 22, a music video for "Suitcase Full of Cash" was released.

== Track listing ==
Cowboy Tears track listing
No.	Title	Writer(s)	Producer(s)	Length
1.	"Cowboys Don't Cry"	Oliver Tree Nickell; Ilan Rubin; Imad Royal	Oliver Tree; Rubin; Royal	3:09
2.	"Swing & a Miss"	Nickell; John Hill; Ethan Snoreck; Casey Mattson	Oliver Tree; Hill; Whethan	2:59
3.	"Freaks & Geeks"	Nickell; Snoreck; Mattson	Oliver Tree; Whethan; Mattson	2:20
4.	"Doormat"	Nickell; Snoreck; Mattson	Oliver Tree; Whethan; Mattson	2:51
5.	"Suitcase Full of Cash"	Nickell; Nick Long; Travis Barker	Oliver Tree; Long; Barker	2:29
6.	"Cigarettes"	Nickell; Long; Barker	Oliver Tree; Long; Barker	2:33
7.	"Balloon Boy"	Nickell; Snoreck; Mattson	Oliver Tree; Whethan; Mattson	2:18
8.	"Things We Used to Do"	Nickell; Hill	Oliver Tree; Hill	2:37
9.	"California"	Nickell; Snoreck; Mattson	Oliver Tree; Whethan; Mattson	2:53
10.	"Get Well Soon" ( (Note: On the CD and cassette releases of the album, as well as some streaming platforms, "Get Well Soon" is track 3 rather than track 10. On the vinyl and other streaming platforms, it is track 10. It is also listed after "California" on the deluxe edition.))	Nickell; Snoreck; Mattson	Oliver Tree; Whethan; Mattson	2:23
11.	"Playing with Fire"	Nickell; Hill; Snoreck	Oliver Tree; Hill; Whethan	2:28
12.	"The Villain"	Nickell; Rubin; Royal	Oliver Tree; Rubin; Royal	2:33
13.	"Cowboy Tears"	Nickell; Marshmello	Oliver Tree; Marshmello	2:57
Total length:				34:30

Cowboy Tears Drown the World in a Swimming Pool of Sorrow (deluxe edition) track listing
No.	Title	Writer(s)	Producer(s)	Length
1.	"I Hate You"	Nickell; Snoreck; Mattson	Oliver Tree; Whethan; Mattson	2:42
2.	"Placeholder"	Nickell; Long; Barker	Oliver Tree; Long; Barker	2:39
3.	"Mind Control"	Nickell; Long; Barker	Oliver Tree; Long; Barker	2:00
4.	"Wasteland"	Nickell; Snoreck	Oliver Tree; Whethan	3:12
5.	"Battleship"	Nickell; Snoreck	Oliver Tree; Whethan	3:12
6.	"Sunshine"	Nickell; Snoreck	Oliver Tree; Whethan	2:15
7.	"Replacement"	Nickell; Snoreck; David Pramik	Oliver Tree; Whethan; Pramik	3:49
8.	"Oxymoron"	Nickell; Snoreck; Dylan Wiggins	Oliver Tree; Whethan; Dylan Patrice	2:44
9.	"Crash Test Dummy"	Nickell; Long; Barker	Oliver Tree; Whethan; Long; Barker	3:05
10.	"The Exploding Man"	Nickell; Long; Barker	Oliver Tree; Long; Barker	2:18
11.	"A-Okay"	Nickell; Long; Barker	Oliver Tree; Long; Barker	3:12
Total length:				65:38

== Personnel ==
- Oliver Tree – vocals, arrangement, additional mixing
- Jacob Dennis – mixing, engineering, vocal production
- Emerson Mancini – mastering
- Casey Mattson – additional mixing
- Cameron Hogan – engineering assistance (1–5, 10, 12, 13)

== Charts ==
Chart performance for Cowboy Tears
Chart (2022)	Peak position
Australian Albums (ARIA)	67
Canadian Albums (Billboard)	91
Scottish Albums (Official Charts)	85
UK Album Downloads (Official Charts)	74
US Billboard 200	60
US Top Alternative Albums (Billboard)	7
US Top Rock Albums (Billboard)	7
