= Ugly Side =

Ugly Side may refer to:

- "Ugly Side", a 2023 song by Oliver Tree from Alone in a Crowd
- "Ugly Side", a 2024 song by Girl in Red from I'm Doing It Again Baby!
