= Hurt (Oliver Tree song) =

Single by Oliver Tree

from the EP Do You Feel Me? and the album Ugly Is Beautiful
- Released: December 7, 2018
- Genre: Alternative rock; Electropop
- Length: 2:25
- Label: Atlantic
- Songwriters: Oliver Tree Nickell; Ethan Snoreck
- Producers: Tree; Snoreck

Oliver Tree singles chronology
| "Alien Boy" (2018) | "Hurt" (2018) | "Miracle Man" (2019) |

Music video
- "Hurt" on YouTube

"Hurt" is a song by American singer Oliver Tree. Written and produced by Tree and Ethan Snoreck, it was released on December 7, 2018, through Atlantic Records as a single from Tree's extended play Do You Feel Me? (2019). The song was included on his debut studio album Ugly Is Beautiful (2020).

The song became one of Tree's breakthrough releases, spending 26 weeks on the Billboard Hot Rock Songs chart. It reached number four on the Billboard Alternative Airplay chart and number eleven on the Hot Rock Songs chart, and was subsequently certified Gold by the Recording Industry Association of America (RIAA) and Music Canada.

== Background and composition ==
According to Oliver Tree, "Hurt" was inspired by a serious scooter accident he experienced while competing in a professional scooter competition when he was 18 years old. Recalling the incident in an interview with Billboard, Tree said that he crashed during a semifinal run after encountering a small pebble while descending a ramp. Tree later explained that both the song and its accompanying music video drew inspiration from the accident, in which he broke both wrists and his right hand. However, he also expressed reluctance to assign a single meaning to the work, stating that listeners should interpret it in their own way.

Musically, "Hurt" has been described as an alternative rock and electropop song. Billboard described the song as featuring a dense melodic hook that builds into a chorus in which Tree "scream-sings" about emotional exhaustion and disappointment.

== Music video and promotion ==
In the music video, Oliver Tree is shown crucified on his motorized scooter, an imagery inspired by his real-life scooter accident.

The music video for "Hurt" was directed by Tree and Brendan Vaughan and was released on December 7, 2018. The video was filmed in Kyiv, Ukraine, and features Tree as multiple protagonists, all of which are shown to die in various ways before the perspective switches between one another, and ends with him ultimately crucifying himself on his signature motorized scooter. In an interview with ALT 98.7, Tree stated that he had envisioned the video concept since he was just 12 years old and was finally able to realize it after obtaining sufficient funding approximately nine and a half years later.

One month after its release, Tree shared a 35-minute behind-the-scenes mockumentary documenting the production of the video, and revealed that the ultimate budget for the video succeeded US$1 Million, making it one of the most expensive music videos of all time.

=== Live performances ===
Tree performed "Hurt" on The Late Late Show with James Corden, marking his late-night television debut. During the performance, he appeared onstage wearing stilts. The song also became a regular part of Tree's concert setlists. During a performance at the Moody Theater in Austin, Texas, audience members chanted for an encore before Tree returned to perform "Hurt" as the final song of the evening. In 2019, American producer NGHTMRE released an official remix of the song.

== Commercial performance ==
"Hurt" became one of Tree's most commercially successful releases and is widely considered to be his breakthrough single. It received immediate attention on alternative radio in the United States upon its release and later peaked at number four on the format's respective chart. In 2019, the song had accumulated more than 15 million streams in the United States according to Nielsen Music. It also generated more than 20 million streams on Spotify and spent 26 weeks on Billboard's Hot Rock Songs chart, peaking at number 11.

== Charts ==
2019 weekly chart performance for "Hurt"
| Chart (2019) | Peak position |
|---|---|
| US Alternative Airplay (Billboard) | 4 |
| US Hot Rock & Alternative Songs (Billboard) | 11 |

2026 weekly chart performance for "Hurt"
| Chart (2026) | Peak position |
|---|---|
| Russia Streaming (TopHit) | 95 |

== Certifications ==
Certifications for "Hurt"
| Region | Certification | Certified units/sales |
|---|---|---|
| Canada (Music Canada) | Gold | 40,000^{‡} |
| United States (RIAA) | Platinum | 1,000,000^{‡} |
^{‡} Sales+streaming figures based on certification alone.
