= Alone in a Crowd (Oliver Tree album) =

Studio album by Oliver Tree
- Released: September 29, 2023
- Studios: Rollover (London); Casa do Mato Estúdios (Rio de Janeiro)
- Length: 31:09
- Label: Atlantic
- Producers: Charlie Handsome; Digital Farm Animals; Jkash; Marshmello; Casey Mattson; David Pramik; Imad Royal; Super Computer; Oliver Tree; Will Vaughan; Whethan

Oliver Tree chronology
Cowboy Tears (2022)	Alone in a Crowd (2023)	Love You Madly Hate You Badly (2026)

Singles from Alone in a Crowd
- 1. "Bounce" Released: June 20, 2023; 2. "One & Only" Released: July 21, 2023; 3. "Essence" Released: September 1, 2023; 4. "Fairweather Friends" Released: September 15, 2023; 5. "With You" Released: September 29, 2023

Alone in a Crowd is the third major-label album by the American singer-songwriter Oliver Tree, released on September 29, 2023, as his final album under Atlantic Records. It includes the singles "Miss You", "Bounce", "One & Only", "Essence" and "Fairweather Friends", and features collaborations with Robin Schulz and Super Computer. Tree embarked on a world tour from October 2023 in support of the album.

== Background ==
A press release stated that the album "explor[es] themes of loneliness, disconnect, and the human experience" and introduces a character named Cornelius Cummings, a fashion designer.

== Track listing ==
All tracks are arranged by Oliver Tree.

Alone in a Crowd track listing
No.	Title	Writer(s)	Producer(s)	Length
1.	"Bounce"	Oliver Tree Nickell; Nick Gale; Will Vaughan; Matt Zara	Oliver Tree; Digital Farm Animals; Vaughan	2:46
2.	"One & Only"	Nickell; Gale; Vaughan	Tree; Digital Farm Animals; Vaughan	2:17
3.	"Essence" (featuring Super Computer)	Nickell; Ethan Snoreck; Super Computer	Tree; Super Computer; Whethan	2:48
4.	"Star"	Nickell; Snoreck	Tree; Jkash; Whethan; Jacob Dennis^{[v]}	1:59
5.	"Fairweather Friends"	Nickell; Snoreck	Tree; Whethan; Dennis^{[v]}	1:34
6.	"Smile"	Nickell; Snoreck	Tree; Whethan; Dennis^{[v]}	2:19
7.	"Ugly Side"	Nickell	Tree; Dennis^{[v]}	1:18
8.	"Highlight of My Life"	Nickell; Snoreck	Tree; Whethan; Dennis^{[v]}	2:29
9.	"The First Night"	Nickell; Kaelyn Behr; Jonathan Hoskins; Ryan Vojtesak	Tree; Charlie Handsome; Hoskins^{[a]}; Styalz Fuego^{[a]}; Dennis^{[v]}	3:04
10.	"Strangers"	Nickell; Snoreck	Tree; Whethan; Dennis^{[v]}	2:51
11.	"Invisible Man"	Nickell; Casey Mattson; Imad Royal	Tree; Mattson; Royal; Dennis^{[v]}	2:26
12.	"Elevator to the Sky"	Nickell; Snoreck	Tree; Whethan; Dennis^{[v]}	2:35
13.	"With You"	Nickell; Mattson; Snoreck	Tree; Mattson; Whethan; Dennis^{[v]}	2:43
Total length:				31:09

Bonus track
No.	Title	Writer(s)	Producer(s)	Length
14.	"Miss You" (with Robin Schulz)	Nickell; Christopher Comstock; David Pramik	Tree; Marshmello; Pramik	3:26
Total length:				34:35

Notes

- ^{^[a]} signifies an additional producer
- ^{^[v]} signifies a vocal producer
- "Miss You" is a remix of "Jerk", originally taken from Ugly Is Beautiful (2020).

== Personnel ==
Musicians

- Oliver Tree – vocals (all tracks), bass guitar (tracks 1–12), synth bass (1–4, 6), synthesizer (1, 5, 7, 9, 10, 12), additional guitar (1), acoustic guitar (3–6, 8, 10, 12), electric guitar (4, 8), piano (6–8, 12), drums (7), Rhodes piano (8), scratching (9), additional synthesizer (11), glockenspiel (12); Moog bass, sounds (13)
- Digital Farm Animals – bass guitar, drums, synthesizer (1, 2)
- Will Vaughan – guitar (1, 2)
- Super Computer – programming (3)
- Whethan – bass guitar, drums (4–6, 8, 10, 12, 13)
- Charlie Handsome – acoustic guitar, drums (9)
- Imad Royal – bass guitar, drums (11)
- Casey Mattson – Rhodes piano, synthesizer (11); guitar, bass guitar (13)
- Robin Schulz – vocals (14)

Technical

- Emerson Mancini – mastering
- Jacob Dennis – mixing (1–13), engineering (all tracks)
- Mike Freesh – mixing (14)
- Ewan Vickery – engineering (1, 2)
- Oliver Tree – additional mixing (all tracks), sound design (7)
- Whethan – additional mixing (3–8, 10, 13), sound design (3–6, 8, 10, 12, 13)
- Imad Royal – sound design (11)

== Charts ==
Chart performance for Alone in a Crowd
Chart (2023–2026)	Peak position
Australian Albums (ARIA)	88
Hungarian Physical Albums (MAHASZ)	22
Scottish Albums (Official Charts)	63
US Billboard 200	143
US Top Alternative Albums (Billboard)	18
