= Alone in a Crowd =

Alone in a Crowd may refer to:

- Alone in a Crowd (Catch 22 album), a 2000 album by Catch 22
- Alone in a Crowd (Oliver Tree album), a 2023 album by Oliver Tree
