= Flowers (Oliver Tree song) =

Single by Oliver Tree

from the album Love You Madly Hate You Badly
- Released: February 20, 2026
- Genre: Pop; alternative pop
- Length: 2:28
- Label: Atlantic
- Songwriter: Oliver Tree
- Producer: Oliver Tree

Oliver Tree singles chronology
"Joyride" (2025)	"Flowers" (2026)	"Deep End" (2026)

Music video
- "Flowers" on YouTube

"Flowers" is a song by American singer and songwriter Oliver Tree, released as the third single from his fourth studio album, Love You Madly Hate You Badly.

== Composition ==
"Flowers" runs for a total of two minutes and 27 seconds. According to Prelude Press, the song "blends his signature blend of pop, alternative, and experimental sounds, reflecting his ongoing mission to create music that transcends genres and connects listeners worldwide."

== Critical reception ==
Imro praised the song and Tree for "pairing relatable, straight-faced humor with his unmistakable off-the-wall antics – from dancing atop an airplane wing in full pilot uniform to meticulously vacuuming the cabin." In That Eric Alper, they analyze that "Flowers" is "a sharp left turn and a bold step forward from his upcoming fourth studio album" and "is a fully realized creative arc unfolding in real time." Emily McCormack from Melodic Magazine wrote "While the pissed-off lyrics may call for a much angrier tone, the Santa Cruz artist continues to combine this anger with cheery alternative-pop beats in his usual genre-bending fashion. He retrospectively explores a toxic relationship and hoping the worst for the heartbreaker." Stereo Saints stated that the track "sounds deceptively playful on the surface but cuts deep lyrically" and "rides a buoyant alt-pop groove, bright and immediate. But then the lyrics hit."
