= Ugly Is Beautiful =

- Digital cover

Studio album by Oliver Tree
- Released: July 17, 2020
- Recorded: 2018–2020
- Genres: Alternative rock; hip-hop; electropop; pop rock; alternative pop
- Length: 37:28
- Label: Atlantic
- Producers: Andrew Goldstein; Casey Mattson; David Pramik; "Downtown" Trevor Brown; Dylan Wiggins; Ethan Snoreck; Imad Royal; Little Ricky ZR3; Marshmello; NVDES; Oliver Tree Nickell; Rogét Chahayed; Stint; William Zaire Simmons

Oliver Tree chronology
Do You Feel Me? (2019)	Ugly Is Beautiful (2020)	Welcome to the Internet (2021)

Singles from Ugly Is Beautiful
- 1. "Hurt" Released: December 7, 2018; 2. "Miracle Man" Released: June 7, 2019; 3. "Cash Machine" Released: December 6, 2019; 4. "Let Me Down" Released: April 7, 2020; 5. "Bury Me Alive" Released: May 26, 2020

Ugly Is Beautiful: Shorter, Thicker & Uglier

Singles from Ugly Is Beautiful: Shorter, Thicker & Uglier
- 1. "Out of Ordinary" Released: February 5, 2021; 2. "Life Goes On" Released: May 28, 2021

Ugly Is Beautiful is the debut major-label studio album by American singer-songwriter Oliver Tree, following seven years of EP releases and an independent album. After two delays, Ugly Is Beautiful was released on July 17, 2020, through Atlantic Records. In addition to Tree himself, the album features production from Andrew Goldstein, David Pramik, Marshmello, NVDES, Rogét Chahayed, Stint, and frequent collaborator Whethan, among others. The album debuted at number 14 on the Billboard 200 and number one on the Top Rock Albums chart. A deluxe version titled Ugly Is Beautiful: Shorter, Thicker & Uglier was released on May 28, 2021.

Tree promoted Ugly Is Beautiful with the graphic novel Oliver Tree vs. Little Ricky: Alien Boys from Z2 Comics.

== Background ==
Tree began hinting at Ugly Is Beautiful shortly after the release of the single "Hurt" in December 2018. He then embarked on the Ugly Is Beautiful Tour. On August 2, 2019, he released Do You Feel Me?, an EP that contains six songs, four of which appear on Ugly Is Beautiful.

On December 6, 2019, Tree released the single "Cash Machine", and announced that Ugly Is Beautiful would be released on March 27, 2020. However, on March 25, just two days before the initial release date, it was announced that the album had been delayed due to the COVID-19 pandemic.

On April 7, 2020, Tree released "Let Me Down". On May 26, he released the single "Bury Me Alive", and announced that the album would be released on June 12, 2020.

On June 8, 2020, Tree announced that he had decided to delay the album yet again, due to the issues of racism and police violence against black people going on at the time after the murder of George Floyd, and the protests surrounding it.

== Deluxe version ==
On May 28, 2021, a deluxe version of the album titled Ugly Is Beautiful: Shorter, Thicker & Uglier was released featuring seven tracks not included on the standard version, including the single "Out of Ordinary". The cover is slightly altered, with the same image of Tree holding balloons behind a fire, but instead smiling and having human testicles in place of his chin.

== Critical reception ==
Professional ratings
Review scores
Source	Rating
AllMusic	4/5 stars
NME	3/5 stars
Pitchfork	4.8/10

Ugly Is Beautiful received mixed reviews from music critics. Ben Jolley of NME said that "beyond the fuzzy guitars and old-school hip-hop beats, Tree's thought-provoking narrative – which tackles depression, loneliness, commercialism, bullying and ignoring haters – proves he's more than a piss-taking internet troll" and that the album "just about silences his credibility critics by delivering wall-to-wall pop-rock ragers while encouraging fans to be unashamedly themselves". However, Cat Zhang of Pitchfork wrote that "for an artist chasing shock and bombast, Oliver Tree's music is surprisingly tame" and criticized the album's length and Tree's voice which "is riddled with distortion, casting a fuzzed-out sameness over even the more left-field selections". Zhang said that Tree's lyrics "indicate deeper struggle behind Tree's ludicrous facade, touching on the same themes of being an outsider, fucking up, and dealing with negativity, although in the vaguest possible terms" but that they appeared heartfelt. She concluded that "the album contains glimmers of a better artist" but was unsure how much of Tree's persona was down to him or other people.

== Track listing ==
Digital edition
No.	Title	Writer(s)	Producer(s)	Length
1.	"Me, Myself & I"	Ethan Snoreck; Oliver Tree Nickell	Nickell; Snoreck	2:53
2.	"1993" (featuring Little Ricky ZR3)	Snoreck; Nickell; Ricky Robinson; Casey Mattson	Nickell; Mattson; Snoreck; Little Ricky ZR3	2:39
3.	"Cash Machine"	Snoreck; Nickell; David Pramik	Nickell; Snoreck; Pramik	2:56
4.	"Let Me Down"	Snoreck; Nickell; Pramik	Nickell; Snoreck; Pramik	1:51
5.	"Miracle Man"	Nickell; Pramik	Nickell; Pramik	2:05
6.	"Bury Me Alive"	Nickell; William Zaire Simmons; Trevor Brown	"Downtown" Trevor Brown; Nickell; Simmons	2:44
7.	"Alien Boy"	Imad Roy El-Amine; Nickell; Mattson	Imad Royal; Nickell; Mattson^{[a]}	2:44
8.	"Joke's on You!"	Nickell; Rogét Chahayed; Ajay Bhattacharyya	Nickell; Chahayed; Stint	3:11
9.	"Again & Again"	Nickell; Josh LaViolette	NVDES; Nickell	2:54
10.	"Waste My Time"	Bhattacharyya; Nickell	Nickell; Stint	3:27
11.	"Jerk"	Marshmello; Nickell; Pramik	Pramik; Marshmello; Nickell	2:15
12.	"Hurt"	Nickell; Snoreck	Nickell; Snoreck	2:25
13.	"Introspective"	Nickell; Andrew Goldstein	Goldstein; Nickell	2:16
14.	"I'm Gone"	Nickell; Dylan Wiggins	Wiggins; Nickell	3:05
Total length:				37:25

Shorter, Thicker & Uglier (Deluxe)
No.	Title	Length
1.	"Life Goes On"	2:41
2.	"Every Type of Friend"	3:13
3.	"Out of Ordinary"	3:00
4.	"Swimmer's Delight (SOS)"	2:48
5.	"When You're Around"	2:12
6.	"All in All"	2:16
7.	"Lies Came Out My Mouth"	2:30
Total length:		56:05

Notes

- ^{^[a]} signifies a co-producer.

== Personnel ==
Credits adapted from Tidal.

Musicians

- Oliver Tree Nickell – vocals
- Ricky Robinson – violin (10)
- Andrew Goldstein – guitar, keyboards, programming (13)

Technical

- Emerson Mancini – mastering
- Mike Freesh – mixing
- Jacob Dennis – engineering (1, 2, 5, 8, 11–13)
- Zaire Koalo – engineering (6)
- Trevor Brown – engineering (6)
- Iain Findlay – engineering (7)
- MacGregor Leo – engineering (9)
- Stint – engineering (10)
- Matt Dyson – engineering (14)

== Charts ==
=== Weekly charts ===
Chart performance for Ugly Is Beautiful
Chart (2020)	Peak position
Australian Albums (ARIA)	23
Austrian Albums (Ö3 Austria)	51
Canadian Albums (Billboard)	47
Irish Albums (Official Charts)	38
New Zealand Albums (RMNZ)	28
UK Albums (Official Charts)	32
US Billboard 200	14
US Top Rock Albums (Billboard)	1

Chart (2026)	Peak position
German Albums (Offizielle Top 100)	84
German Rock & Metal Albums (Offizielle Top 100)	19

=== Year-end charts ===
Year-end chart performance for Ugly Is Beautiful
Chart (2020)	Position
US Top Rock Albums (Billboard)	74
Chart (2021)	Position
US Top Rock Albums (Billboard)	85

== Certifications ==
Certifications for Ugly Is Beautiful
Region	Certification	Certified units/sales
Brazil (Pro-Música Brasil)	Gold	20,000^{‡}
Canada (Music Canada)	Gold	40,000^{‡}
New Zealand (RMNZ)	Gold	7,500^{‡}
United Kingdom (BPI)	Silver	60,000^{‡}
United States (RIAA)	Gold	500,000^{‡}
^{‡} Sales+streaming figures based on certification alone.
