= Imad Royal =

Canadian singer-songwriter (born 1992)

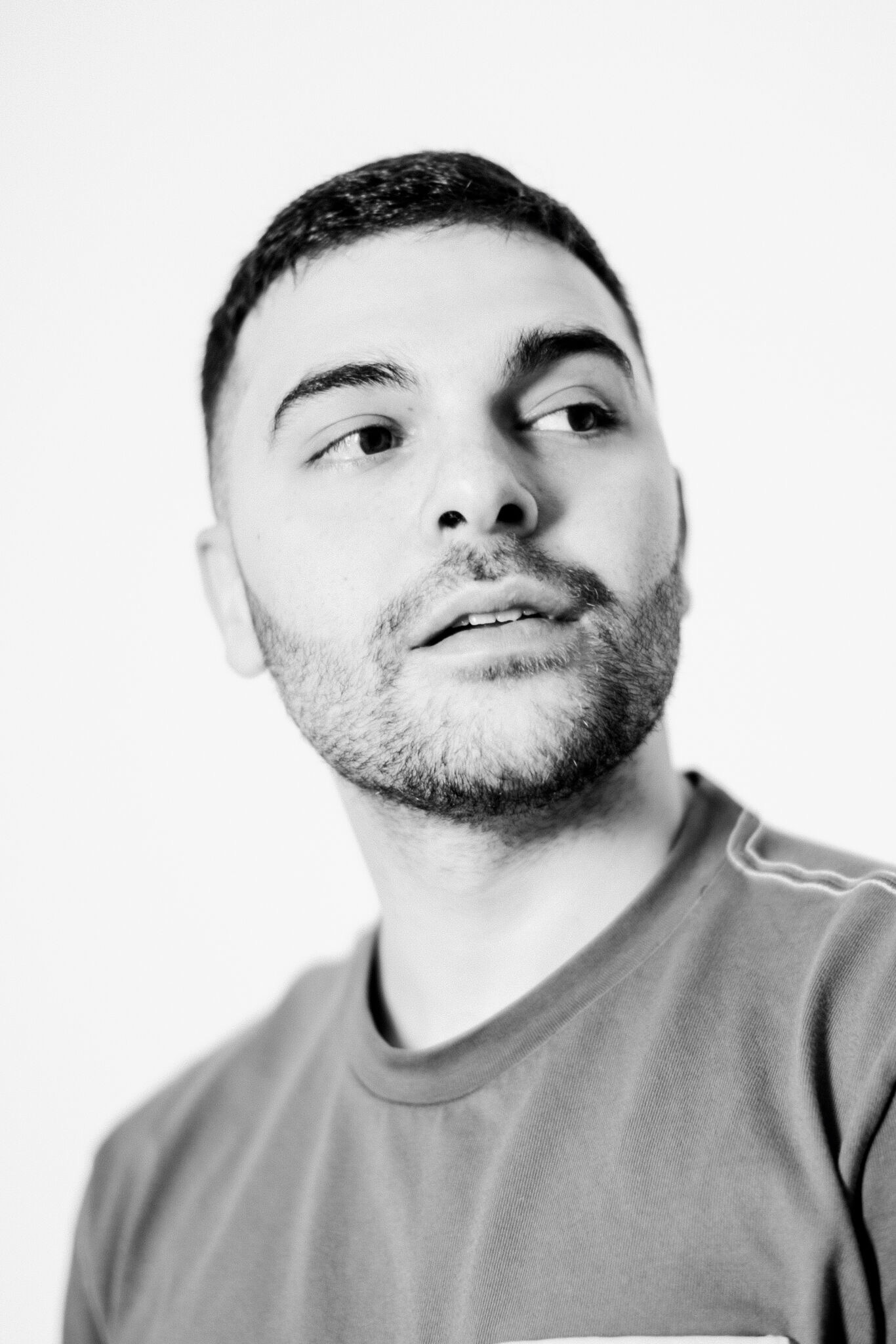

Background information
- Born: Imad-Roy El-Amine; April 28, 1992 (age 34)
- Origin: Quebec City, Quebec
- Genres: Pop; alt-pop; alternative; electro-pop; hip hop; R&B; electronic
- Years active: 2014–present
- Label: Atlantic
- Website: imadroyal.com

Imad-Roy El-Amine (born April 28, 1992), known by his stage name Imad Royal, is a Lebanese Canadian electronic R&B singer, producer, and songwriter.

Imad Has had a heavy hand in projects with gnash, Oliver Tree, MAX, Quinn XCII, JAWNY, Keshi, Rico Nasty. His earlier work includes cuts on #1 albums by The Chainsmokers and Panic! At The Disco's Grammy-nominated album, “Pray for the Wicked”, where he is credited as a producer on the album's lead single. He worked heavily on the Birds of Prey soundtrack, including the singles, Doja Cat’s “Boss Bitch” and Charlotte Lawrence’s “Joke's On You”, MAX’s singles “Love Me Less" (feat. Quinn XCII) and “Blueberry Eyes" (feat. SUGA of BTS) as well as 5 additional songs from his latest album Colour Vision. Recent cuts include "Take it Back" - Jawny ft. Beck, "Proof" - BTS, "Surrender My Heart" - Carly Rae Jepson, and many more

== Discography ==
=== Singles ===
- Troubles (2015)
- Down For Whatever feat. Pell (2016)
- Bad 4 U (2016)
- Queen of France (2019)
- Seeing Red (2020)
- Selfish (2024)

=== EPs ===
- Cycles (Octal Sound, 2014)
- Everything Happens (Nice Life, Atlantic, 2017)

== Selected songwriting and production credits ==
Year	Artist	Album	Song	Role (Note: All songwriting and production credits are shared unless specially noted)	Notes
2015	Panic! at the Disco	Death of a Bachelor	"Hallelujiah"	Producer, songwriter	RIAA: Platinum. Nominated for Best Rock Album at the 59th Annual Grammy Awards
2016	Louis The Child, Icona Pop	Weekend - Single	"Weekend"	Producer	RIAA: Gold
2017	The Chainsmokers	Memories...Do Not Open	"Don't Say" (feat. Emily Warren)	Songwriter	RIAA: Platinum
2018	Oliver Tree	Alien Boy	"Alien Boy"	Producer (album), Composer ("Alien Boy")	RIAA: Platinum
2018	Bea Miller	Aurora	"Girlfriend"	Producer, songwriter	
2019	Panic! at the Disco	Pray for the Wicked	"Say Amen (Saturday Night)"	Producer, songwriter	RIAA: Platinum
2019	MAX feat. Quinn XCII	Colour Vision	"Love Me Less"	Composer, guitar; Producer	RIAA: Gold
2019	gnash	we	"t-shirt" "nobody's home"	Producer, songwriter	RIAA: Gold
2020	Doja Cat	Birds of Prey	"Boss Bitch"	Producer, songwriter	RIAA: Platinum; BPI: Silver, FIMI: Gold
2020	Charlotte Lawrence	Birds of Prey	"Joke's on You"	Producer, songwriter	
2020	Jucee Froot	Birds of Prey	"Danger"	Producer, songwriter	
2020	Jurnee Smollett-Bell feat. Black Canary	Birds of Prey	"It's a Man's Man's Man's World"	Producer	
2020	Quinn XCII	A Letter To My Younger Self	"Coffee" "Mad at Me". "Everything I Need". "Am I High RN" "A Letter to my Younger Self" "Meeting Strangers"	Executive producer, Producer, songwriter	
2020	MAX	Colour Vision	"Colour Vision" "Love Me Less ft. Quinn XCII" "Blueberry Eyes" "New Life" "Checklist" "SOS" "There is a God"	Producer, songwriter	"Love Me Less ft. Quinn XCII" RIAA Platinum
2020	Carlie Hanson feat. Iann Dior	Ego - Single	"Ego"	Producer, songwriter	
2020	Drax Project feat. Fetty Wap & Aacacia	Firefly - Single	"Firefly"	Producer, songwriter	
2021	Anthony Ramos	Space Jam: A New Legacy Soundtrack	"The Best"	Producer, songwriter	
2021	Jawny	The Story of Hugo - EP	"Best Thing" "Take it Back" "You Should Watch This One" "Tombstone Grey"	Producer, songwriter	
2021	Yung Bae ft. Sam Fischer & Pink Sweat$	Silver & Gold - Single	"Silver & Gold"	Producer, songwriter	
2022	Oliver Tree	Cowboy Tears	"Cowboy's Don't Cry" "The Villain"	Producer, songwriter	
2022	Keshi	Gabriel	"Hell/Heaven"	Producer, songwriter	
2022	BTS	Proof	"For Youth"	Producer, songwriter	
2022	Carly Rae Jepson	The Loneliest Time	"Surrender My Heart"	Producer, songwriter	
2022	Gryffin, Au/Ra	Alive	"Evergreen"	Producer, songwriter	
2023	Jawny	It's Never Fair, Always True	"Intro" "Strawberry Chainsaw" "LaLaLa" "Wide Eyed" "Adios" "Take it Back ft. Beck" "Death is a DJ" "Giving Up on You" "True" "Fall in Love" "I Look Better When I'm in Love"	Executive producer, Producer, songwriter	
2023	Gayle	Everybody Hates Me - Single	"Everybody Hates Me"	Producer, songwriter	
2023	(G)I-dle	I Do - Single	"I Do"	Producer, songwriter	
2023	MAX ft. Huh Yunjin of Le Sserafim	Stupid in Love - Single	"Stupid in Love ft. Huh Yunjin of Le Sserafim"	Producer, songwriter	
2024	Jazmin Bean	Traumatic Livelihood	"Black Dress"	Producer, songwriter	
2024	Benson Boone	Fireworks & Rollerblades	"My Greatest Fear"	Producer, songwriter	
2024	Gayle ft. Nile Rodgers	Internet Baby - Single	"Internet Baby ft. Nile Rodgers"	Producer, songwriter	
2024	INJI	Sexy4Eva - Single	"Sexy4Eva"	Producer, songwriter	
2024	Quinn XCII	Breakfast - EP	"Natural High ft. Allen Stone" "Cruel Love ft. KYLE"	Producer, songwriter	
2024	Keshi	Requiem	"Amen" "Say" "Night" "Soft Spot" "Like That" "Texas" "War" "Bodies" "Requiem" "Euphoria" "ID"	Producer, songwriter	
2024	Tiesto	Tantalizing - Single	"Tantalizing"	Producer, songwriter	
2024	Lane Pittman	Amen For The Weekend - Single	"Amen For The Weekend"	Producer, songwriter	
2025	Carly Rae Jepsen	Emotion (10th Anniversary Edition)	"Lost in Devotion"	Producer, songwriter	

*Selected Discography noted
