= Life Goes On (Oliver Tree song) =

- Cover art of remix versions

Single by Oliver Tree

from the album Ugly Is Beautiful: Shorter, Thicker & Uglier
- Released: May 28, 2021
- Genre: Pop rock; pop rap; hip-hop
- Length: 2:41
- Label: Atlantic
- Songwriters: Oliver Tree Nickell; Tanner Petulla
- Producers: Getter; Oliver Tree

Oliver Tree singles chronology
"Out of Ordinary" (2021)	"Life Goes On" (2021)	"Turn It Up" (2021)

Music video
- "Life Goes On" on YouTube

"Life Goes On" is a song by American singer-songwriter Oliver Tree. Written and produced alongside Getter, it was released on May 28, 2021, through Atlantic Records, as the second single from the deluxe version of his debut studio album, Ugly Is Beautiful (2020).

== Content ==
Tree stated in an interview that "Life Goes On" is about "a problematic relationship where one person treats the other person badly. Shouldn't waste time on toxic people". The song is written in the key of C major, with a tempo of 80 beats per minute. The song is also performed in double time.

== Music videos ==
A music video for "Life Goes On" was directed by Tree and uploaded to his official YouTube channel on May 28, 2021. Additionally, Tree would release a lyric video to his official YouTube channel on September 10, 2021, just four months later.

A remix of the song, along with a music video, which featured American rappers Trippie Redd and Ski Mask the Slump God was released on December 17, 2021, along with an appearance from the Island Boys.

== Charts ==
=== Weekly charts ===
Weekly chart performance for "Life Goes On"
Chart (2021–2022)	Peak position
Australia (ARIA)	34
Austria (Ö3 Austria Top 40)	24
Canada Hot 100 (Billboard)	46
CIS Airplay (TopHit)	29
Germany (GfK)	54
Global 200 (Billboard)	26
Hungary (Stream Top 40)	28
India International (IMI)	12
Ireland (IRMA)	33
Lithuania (AGATA)	10
Netherlands (Single Top 100)	95
New Zealand (Recorded Music NZ)	24
Norway (VG-lista)	14
Portugal (AFP)	38
Russia Airplay (TopHit)	23
South Africa Streaming (RISA)	80
Sweden (Sverigetopplistan)	63
Switzerland (Schweizer Hitparade)	34
UK Singles (Official Charts)	33
US Billboard Hot 100	71
US Adult Pop Airplay (Billboard)	36
US Hot Rock & Alternative Songs (Billboard)	7
US Pop Airplay (Billboard)	26

Chart (2026)	Peak position
Argentina (CAPIF)	7
Bolivia (Billboard)	11
Brazil Hot 100 (Billboard)	81
Chile (Billboard)	17
Ecuador Streaming (Promúsica)	4
Mexico (Billboard)	24
Panama Streaming (PRODUCE)	56
Peru Streaming (Promúsica)	3
Poland (Polish Streaming Top 100)	62
Russia Streaming (TopHit)	57

=== Year-end charts ===
2021 year-end chart performance for "Life Goes On"
Chart (2021)	Position
US Hot Rock & Alternative Songs (Billboard)	56

2022 year-end chart performance for "Life Goes On"
Chart (2022)	Position
US Hot Rock & Alternative Songs (Billboard)	25

== Certifications ==
Certifications for "Life Goes On"
Region	Certification	Certified units/sales
Austria (IFPI Austria)	Gold	15,000^{‡}
Brazil (Pro-Música Brasil)	3× Platinum	120,000^{‡}
Canada (Music Canada)	Platinum	80,000^{‡}
France (SNEP)	Gold	100,000^{‡}
Italy (FIMI)	Gold	50,000^{‡}
Poland (ZPAV)	Platinum	50,000^{‡}
Portugal (AFP)	Gold	5,000^{‡}
United Kingdom (BPI)	Silver	200,000^{‡}
United States (RIAA)	Platinum	1,000,000^{‡}
^{‡} Sales+streaming figures based on certification alone.

== Release history ==
Release history for "Life Goes On"
Region	Date	Format	Label	Ref.
Various	May 28, 2021	Digital download; streaming	Atlantic	
Italy	October 22, 2021	Contemporary hit radio	Atlantic	
