= David Pramik =

American record producer and songwriter

- Born: David Andrew Pramik; November 20, 1990 (age 36); Santa Clarita, California
- Education: Berklee College of Music
- Occupations: Record producer, songwriter

David Andrew Pramik (born November 20, 1990) is an American record producer based in Los Angeles.

== Career ==
David Pramik has written and produced songs for a number of artists, including Selena Gomez, Bebe Rexha, Logic, Rag’n’Bone Man, X Ambassadors, Machine Gun Kelly, Oliver Tree, LANY, I Prevail, Lauv, Nothing More, Vic Mensa, Illenium, JP Cooper, One OK Rock, Sublime with Rome, Hey Violet, MAX, Cemetery Sun, Chris Lane, and Molly Kate Kestner.

Pramik co-wrote and co-produced Nothing More's single "Go To War" and "Home" by Machine Gun Kelly feat. X Ambassadors & Bebe Rexha, which was the lead single off of Bright: The Album.

Pramik was nominated for a Grammy Award for his work on Nothing More's single "Go To War", which peaked at number 1 in the US Rock Radio charts, number 1 on the US Mainstream Rock Chart, and was nominated for three Grammys (Best Rock Song, Best Rock Album, Best Rock Performance).

Pramik co-wrote and co-produced multiple songs on the Grammy-Nominated I Prevail album, Trauma, including the lead singles off the album "Bow Down" and "Breaking Down". "Breaking Down" peaked at number 2 on the Active Rock Radio Charts in mid-2019. In November 2019, it was announced that the song "Bow Down" had received a Grammy nomination for Best Metal Performance.

In January 2020, Pramik co-wrote and produced the album Cut You Off by Selena Gomez. He also frequently collaborated with Oliver Tree.

Pramik's songs have gotten numerous sync and licensing placements, including trailers for 24: Legacy, War of the Planet of the Apes and Just Mercy, as well as commercials for the Android operating system, Altice USA and Jeep.

He is signed to Prescription Songs Publishing, under the umbrella of Kobalt Music Group, and is an alumnus of Berklee College of Music.

== Production and songwriting discography ==
Year	Song	Artist	Album	Producer	Songwriter	Notes
2016	"Go to War"	Nothing More	The Stories We Tell Ourselves		check	
2016	"Go Tell Em"	Vic Mensa	The Birth of a Nation: The Inspired By Album	check	check	
2016	"Maybe"	Chris Lane	Girl Problems		check	
2016	"Somebody's Angel"	Jacquie Lee	Non-album single	check		
2016	"Ruins"	Ryder	—N/a	—N/a	—N/a	
2016	"Horns"	Bryce Fox	Heaven on Hold	check	check	
2016	"Lifeline"	Kenny Holland	Non-album single	—N/a	—N/a	
2016	"Anything You Want"	HYDDE & Moonzz	Non-album single		check	
2016	"Ghost"	HYDDE & Hawkes	Non-album single		check	
2017	"Piece of Shit"	Cemetery Sun	Non-album single	check	check	
2017	"Broken People"	Logic & Rag'n'Bone Man	Bright: The Album		check	
2017	"Home"	Machine Gun Kelly, X Ambassadors & Bebe Rexha	Bright: The Album	check	check	
2017	"Beautiful Creatures" (featuring MAX)	Illenium	Awake		check	
2017	"Passport Home"	JP Cooper	Raised Under Grey Skies	check		Additional producer, programmer
2017	"Unholy"	Hey Violet	From The Outside	check	check	Recording engineer
2017	"Compromise"	Molly Kate Kestner	Non-album single		check	
2017	"Break A Little"	Kirstin	L O V E	check	check	
2017	"All Night"	Kirstin	L O V E	check	check	
2017	"Naked"	Kirstin	L O V E	check	check	
2017	"Something Real"	Kirstin	L O V E	check	check	
2017	"See It"	Kirstin	L O V E	check	check	
2017	"Gemini"	HYDDE & RUNN	Non-album single		check	
2017	"I Am The Mountain"	HYDDE & Vives	Non-album single		check	
2018	"Meant To Be" (acoustic)	Bebe Rexha	Non-album single	check		
2018	"Almost Back" (featuring Phoebe Ryan)	Kaskade	Non-album single		check	
2018	"Wasted Love"	Yellowbird Mantra	New England Weather	check	check	
2018	"Blurry Eyes" (featuring RUNN)	Hotel Garuda	Non-album single	—N/a	—N/a	
2018	"If You See Her"	LANY	Malibu Nights		check	
2018	"In The Blood"	Red Rosamond	Non-album single		check	
2018	"Do It All the Time"	I Dont Know How but They Found Me	1981 Extended Play	check	check	
2018	"Bleed Magic"	I Dont Know How but They Found Me	1981 Extended Play	check	check	
2018	"Serotonin"	Call Me Karizma	Non-album single	check	check	Programmer
2018	"These Hands"	Emmalyn	0405			
2019	"Miracle Man"	Oliver Tree	Ugly Is Beautiful	check	check	
2019	"Cash Machine"	Oliver Tree	Ugly Is Beautiful	check	check	
2019	"Monster (Under My Bed)"	Call Me Karizma	The Gloomy Tapes, Vol. 2	check	check	
2019	"Bleach"	Call Me Karizma	Non-album single	check	check	
2019	"Push Back"	One Ok Rock	Eye of the Storm	check	check	
2019	"The Last Time"	One Ok Rock	Eye of the Storm (Japanese edition)	check	check	
2019	"Breaking Down"	I Prevail	Trauma		check	
2019	"Bow Down"	I Prevail	Trauma		check	
2019	"Paranoid"	I Prevail	Trauma		check	
2019	"DOA"	I Prevail	Trauma		check	
2019	"Light On"	Sublime with Rome	Blessings (Sublime with Rome album)	check		
2019	"Giants"	Jackson Guthy	Stories	check	check	
2019	"Stories"	Jackson Guthy	Stories	check	check	
2019	"Crash"	Jackson Guthy	Stories	check	check	
2019	"Two Little Lights"	Jackson Guthy	Stories		check	
2019	"Mess Your Hair Up"	Stewart Taylor	Non-album single	—N/a	—N/a	
2019	"Run Like a Rebel"	The Score	Stay	check	check	
2019	"Lovers + Strangers"	Starley	One of One	check	check	
2020	"Cut You Off"	Selena Gomez	Rare	check	check	
2020	"Therapist"	Mae Muller	Non-album single	check	check	
2020	"Invisible Chains"	Lauren Jauregui	Birds of Prey	check	check	
2020	"Bodies"	Bryce Fox	Strength	check		
2020	"Angel Cry"	G-Eazy	Non-album single	check	check	
2020	"Float"	Call Me Karizma	Non-album single	check	check	
2020	"DOA" (featuring Joyner Lucas)	I Prevail	Trauma		check	
2020	"Let Me Down"	Oliver Tree	Ugly Is Beautiful	check	check	
2020	"Let Me Down" (featuring Blink 182)	Oliver Tree	Non-album single	check	check	
2020	"Jerk"	Oliver Tree	Ugly Is Beautiful	check	check	
2020	"Feel Something" (featuring I Prevail)	Illenium & Excision	Non-album single	check	check	
2020	"Craving" (featuring Elle Duke)	ARTY & Audien	Non-album single		check	
2020	"With Me"	Terrell Hines	Portal One: The Mixtape	check	check	
2020	"What Do I Call You"	Taeyeon	What Do I Call You		check	
2020	"I Want To Be With You"	Chloe Moriondo	Blood Bunny	check	check	
2021	"Girl Who Didn't Care"	Tenille Townes	Non-album single	check	check	
2021	"Lie"	Oskr	Non-album single		check	
2021	"Catch-22"	guccihighwaters	joke's on you	check	check	
2021	"Free"	Pretty Much	Non-album single	check	check	Co-producer
2021	"Poster Girl"	Zara Larsson	Poster Girl		check	
2021	"Telling Myself"	Joshua Bassett	Joshua Bassett	check	check	
2021	"Better" (acoustic)	RUNN	Non-album single		check	
2021	"I Eat Boys"	Chloe Moriondo	Blood Bunny	check	check	
2021	"Bodybag"	Chloe Moriondo	Blood Bunny	check	check	
2021	"Take Your Time"	Chloe Moriondo	Blood Bunny	check	check	
2021	"What If It Doesn't End Well"	Chloe Moriondo	Blood Bunny	check	check	
2021	"Renegades"	One Ok Rock	Luxury Disease	check	check	
2021	"Wonder"	One Ok Rock	Luxury Disease	check	check	
2021	"Sorry Isn't Good Enough"	Joy Oladokun	In Defense of My Own Happiness	check	check	
2021	"Hate Myself"	Bryce Fox	Strength	check	check	
2021	"Nasty"	Bryce Fox	Strength	check	check	
2021	"Strength"	Bryce Fox	Strength	check	check	
2021	"Burn It Down"	Against the Current	Fever	—N/a	—N/a	
2021	"Jump"	Against the Current	Fever	—N/a	—N/a	
2021	"Superhero" (featuring Alna)	Illenium & William Black	Fallen Embers	check	check	
2021	"Want What I Can't Have"	Ivy Adara	—N/a	—N/a	—N/a	
2021	"When You're Around"	Oliver Tree	Ugly Is Beautiful: Shorter, Thicker & Uglier	check	check	
2022	"Hot Tea"	Half•Alive	Give Me Your Shoulders, Pt. 1	check	check	
2022	"Back Around"	Half•Alive	Give Me Your Shoulders, Pt. 1	check	check	
2022	"Upgrade" (featuring Dreamers)	Twin XL	Non-album single	check	check	
2022	"How To Be Happy"	RUNN	Non-album single	check		Co-producer
2022	"Blows"	Bryce Fox	Strength	check	check	
2022	"Where To Find Me"	New Rules	Go The Distance	check	check	
2022	"Settle On Back"	Jimmie Allen	Tulip Drive		check	
2022	"Hell Hounds"	Chloe Moriondo	Blood Bunny (Deluxe)	check	check	
2022	"Fruity"	Chloe Moriondo	SUCKERPUNCH	check	check	
2022	"I Miss Myself"	renforshort	dear amelia	check	check	Co-producer
2022	"SOS" (featuring Octavio the Dweeb)	Blame My Youth	Non-album single	check	check	
2022	"Replacement"	Oliver Tree	Cowboy Tears Drown the World in a Swimming Pool of Sorrow	check	check	Co-producer
2023	"Hit It"	Snow Wife	Queen Degenerate	check	check	
2025	"SLEEPWALKER" (featuring brakence)	Aries	Glass Jaw	check	check	
