= Jerk (Oliver Tree song) =

2020 song by Oliver Tree

Song by Oliver Tree

from the album Ugly Is Beautiful
- Released: July 17, 2020
- Genre: Rock
- Length: 2:15
- Label: Atlantic
- Songwriters: Christopher Comstock; Oliver Tree Nickell; David Pramik
- Producers: Pramik; Marshmello; Tree

Lyric video
- "Jerk" on YouTube

"Jerk" (also known as "Worth Nothing" and "Miss You") is a song by American singer-songwriter Oliver Tree, originally released on July 17, 2020 through Atlantic Records, as part of his debut studio album, Ugly Is Beautiful. The rock song was written by Oliver Tree, alongside the song's producers, Marshmello and David Pramik. Upon release, the song largely stood out to music critics reviewing the album. With attention given to its vocal style, Pitchfork writer Cat Zhang identified "congested groan haunt[ings]" of Billie Joe Armstrong, while NME's Ben Jolly described the song as "an anti-bullying anthem-in-waiting". Tree sings about his experiences of being an outcast and eventually realizes that his hatred for jerks is "a double-edged sword".

The song has two notable remixes. It was first remixed by Southstar as "Miss You" in 2022, before another remix of the same name was released as a single by both Oliver Tree and Robin Schulz, as a bonus track for the former's third studio album, Alone in a Crowd (2023). The Schulz remix found success, peaking at number 81 on the Billboard Hot 100 and topping charts in Lithuania, and the Netherlands, though also garnered some controversy in plagiarism allegations. After Oliver Tree's death in June 2026, the remix re-entered the Billboard US Hot Dance/Electronic Songs chart, peaking at number 2.

== Charts ==
Chart performance for "Jerk"
Chart (2026)	Peak position
Russia Streaming (TopHit)	93

== Southstar remix ==
"Miss You"

Single by Southstar
- Released: May 9, 2022
- Genre: EDM
- Length: 3:26
- Label: B1; Columbia
- Songwriters: Christopher Comstock; Oliver Tree Nickell; David Pramik
- Producer: Southstar

Southstar singles chronology
"Matrix" (2022)	"Miss You" (2022)	"Miss You (Sped Up Version)" (2022)

Music video
- "Miss You" on YouTube

German DJ and producer Southstar released a remix of the song on May 9, 2022, titled "Miss You". Due to Southstar using Tree's vocals without permission, it was later re-released as a single on July 30, 2022 with re-recorded vocals sung by Julian Perretta, through the B1 Recordings label. A "sped-up version" of the song was released on October 12, 2022. It debuted at number 88 in Germany and went on to reach the top 10 by October, as well as the top 40 in Austria, Ireland, Lithuania and Switzerland.

=== Charts ===
==== Weekly charts ====
2022 weekly chart performance
Chart (2022)	Peak position
Australia (ARIA)	61
Austria (Ö3 Austria Top 40)	6
Belarus Airplay (TopHit)	8
Canada (Canadian Hot 100)	98
CIS Airplay (TopHit)	57
Croatia International Airplay (Top lista)	76
Czech Republic Singles Digital (ČNS IFPI)	54
Estonia Airplay (TopHit)	2
Finland (Suomen virallinen lista)	20
France (SNEP)	130
Germany (GfK)	6
Germany Airplay (MusicTrace)	41
Global 200 (Billboard)	71
Ireland (IRMA)	11
Kazakhstan Airplay (TopHit)	23
Latvia Airplay (TopHit)	185
Lithuania (AGATA)	3
Netherlands (Single Top 100)	30
New Zealand (Recorded Music NZ)	39
Norway (VG-lista)	28
Portugal (AFP)	98
Russia Airplay (TopHit)	73
Slovakia Singles Digital (ČNS IFPI)	30
Sweden (Sverigetopplistan)	53
Switzerland (Schweizer Hitparade)	11
UK Singles (Official Charts)	23
UK Dance (Official Charts)	8
US Hot Dance/Electronic Songs (Billboard)	11

==== Year-end charts ====
2022 year-end chart performance for "Miss You"
Chart (2022)	Position
Austria (Ö3 Austria Top 40)	73
Germany (Official German Charts)	48
Lithuania (AGATA)	97

2023 year-end chart performance for "Miss You"
Chart (2023)	Position
Belarus Airplay (TopHit)	44
Estonia Airplay (TopHit)	20
Germany (Official German Charts)	88
US Hot Dance/Electronic Songs (Billboard)	83

=== Certifications ===
Certifications for "Miss You"
Region	Certification	Certified units/sales
Austria (IFPI Austria)	Platinum	30,000^{‡}
France (SNEP)	Gold	100,000^{‡}
Germany (BVMI)	Gold	200,000^{‡}
New Zealand (RMNZ)	Gold	15,000^{‡}
Poland (ZPAV)	Gold	25,000^{‡}
Switzerland (IFPI Switzerland)	Platinum	20,000^{‡}
United Kingdom (BPI)	Silver	200,000^{‡}
^{‡} Sales+streaming figures based on certification alone.

== Robin Schulz and Oliver Tree remix ==
"Oliver Tree & Robin Schulz - Miss You"
17-second sample starting just before the beat drop

"Miss You"

Single by Robin Schulz and Oliver Tree

from the album Alone in a Crowd
- Released: August 5, 2022
- Genre: EDM
- Length: 3:26
- Label: Atlantic
- Songwriters: Christopher Comstock; Oliver Tree Nickell; David Pramik
- Producer: Robin Schulz

Robin Schulz singles chronology
"Sun Will Shine" (2022)	"Miss You" (2022)	"Rockstar Baby" (2022)

Oliver Tree singles chronology
"I Hate You" (2022)	"Miss You" (2022)	"Voices" (2023)

Music video
- "Miss You" on YouTube

Another remix of the song was released on August 5, 2022, by German DJ Robin Schulz, credited to both Schulz and Oliver Tree. The remix peaked at number 1 on the UK Dance Singles and the national charts of Lithuania and the Netherlands. It also reached the top 10 in Australia, Finland, Ireland, Mexico, Norway and other countries. It reached number 4 on the US Hot Dance/Electronic Songs chart published by Billboard, as well as number 84 on the Billboard Hot 100.

The release sparked controversy, with Schulz being accused of releasing an almost identical song to Southstar's remix with few alterations, with Der Spiegel claiming that the songs are in the same key and use very similar arrangements. Several artists, including Bausa, Prinz Pi and Yung Hurn, spoke out against Schulz, urging fans to stream the original by Southstar instead. In response to the backlash, Schulz's manager Stefan Dabruck issued a statement saying that the confusion around "Miss You" was "intentional" and that Schulz was hoping for a remix with Southstar prior to the release. A spokesperson from Atlantic Records claimed that the Robin Schulz version is the "definitive version" of the remix, and that Southstar remixed "Jerk" without permission, using re-recorded vocals to prevent Oliver Tree and his label from receiving royalties.

=== Charts ===
==== Weekly charts ====
2022–2023 weekly chart performance
Chart (2022–2023)	Peak position
Argentina Anglo Airplay (Monitor Latino)	14
Australia (ARIA)	4
Austria (Ö3 Austria Top 40)	10
Belarus Airplay (TopHit)	9
Belgium (Ultratop 50 Flanders)	6
Belgium (Ultratop 50 Wallonia)	19
Bolivia Anglo Airplay (Monitor Latino)	12
Bulgaria Airplay (PROPHON)	7
Canada Hot 100 (Billboard)	28
Chile Anglo Airplay (Monitor Latino)	9
Colombia Anglo Airplay (Monitor Latino)	10
CIS Airplay (TopHit)	19
Croatia (Billboard)	21
Croatia International Airplay (Top lista)	19
Czech Republic Airplay (ČNS IFPI)	16
Czech Republic Singles Digital (ČNS IFPI)	5
Denmark (Tracklisten)	25
Ecuador Anglo Airplay (Monitor Latino)	6
Estonia Airplay (TopHit)	7
Finland (Suomen virallinen lista)	4
France (SNEP)	23
France Airplay (SNEP)	40
Germany (GfK)	12
Global 200 (Billboard)	11
Hungary (Rádiós Top 40)	32
Hungary (Single Top 40)	13
Hungary (Stream Top 40)	18
Iceland (Tónlistinn)	20
Ireland (IRMA)	2
Italy (FIMI)	25
Italy Airplay (EarOne)	72
Kazakhstan Airplay (TopHit)	146
Latvia Airplay (LaIPA)	13
Latvia Streaming (LaIPA)	5
Lithuania (AGATA)	1
Netherlands (Single Top 100)	1
New Zealand (Recorded Music NZ)	6
Norway (VG-lista)	3
Paraguay Anglo Airplay (Monitor Latino)	10
Poland Airplay (ZPAV)	25
Poland Streaming (OLiS)	6
Portugal (AFP)	23
Russia Airplay (TopHit)	23
Slovakia Airplay (ČNS IFPI)	27
Slovakia Singles Digital (ČNS IFPI)	4
South Africa Streaming (TOSAC)	41
Spain (Promusicae)	37
Spain Airplay (Promusicae)	13
Sweden (Sverigetopplistan)	21
Switzerland (Schweizer Hitparade)	9
UK Singles (Official Charts)	3
UK Dance (Official Charts)	1
US Billboard Hot 100	84
US Hot Dance/Electronic Songs (Billboard)	4
US Pop Airplay (Billboard)	27

2026 weekly chart performance
Chart (2026)	Peak position
Peru Streaming (Promúsica)	16
US Hot Dance/Electronic Songs (Billboard)	2

==== Monthly charts ====
Monthly chart performance
Chart (2023)	Peak position
Belarus Airplay (TopHit)	19
CIS Airplay (TopHit)	33
Estonia Airplay (TopHit)	5
Russia Airplay (TopHit)	36

==== Year-end charts ====
Chart (2022)	Position
Belgium (Ultratop 50 Flanders)	128
Hungary (Stream Top 40)	90
Lithuania (AGATA)	37
Netherlands (Dutch Top 40)	53
Netherlands (Single Top 100)	52
Switzerland (Schweizer Hitparade)	90
US Hot Dance/Electronic Songs (Billboard)	53

Chart (2023)	Position
Australia (ARIA)	46
Belarus Airplay (TopHit)	60
Belgium (Ultratop 50 Flanders)	52
Belgium (Ultratop 50 Wallonia)	73
Canada (Canadian Hot 100)	94
Estonia Airplay (TopHit)	40
Germany (Official German Charts)	89
Global 200 (Billboard)	97
Netherlands (Single Top 100)	48
Poland (Polish Streaming Top 100)	84
Russia Airplay (TopHit)	73
Switzerland (Schweizer Hitparade)	82
UK Singles (OCC)	61
US Hot Dance/Electronic Songs (Billboard)	8

=== Certifications ===
Certifications for "Miss You"
Region	Certification	Certified units/sales
Australia (ARIA)	2× Platinum	140,000^{‡}
Austria (IFPI Austria)	Platinum	30,000^{‡}
Canada (Music Canada)	2× Platinum	160,000^{‡}
Denmark (IFPI Danmark)	Gold	45,000^{‡}
France (SNEP)	Diamond	333,333^{‡}
Italy (FIMI)	Platinum	100,000^{‡}
New Zealand (RMNZ)	2× Platinum	60,000^{‡}
Poland (ZPAV)	4× Platinum	200,000^{‡}
Portugal (AFP)	Platinum	10,000^{‡}
Spain (Promusicae)	Platinum	60,000^{‡}
Switzerland (IFPI Switzerland)	2× Platinum	40,000^{‡}
United Kingdom (BPI)	Platinum	600,000^{‡}
United States (RIAA)	Platinum	1,000,000^{‡}
^{‡} Sales+streaming figures based on certification alone.
