= Superhero (Oliver Tree song) =

Single by Oliver Tree

from the album Love You Madly Hate You Badly
- Released: October 10, 2025
- Length: 3:18
- Label: Atlantic
- Songwriter: Oliver Tree
- Producer: Oliver Tree

Oliver Tree singles chronology
"Ultraman" (2024)	"Superhero" (2025)	"Joyride" (2025)

Music video
- "Superhero" on YouTube

"Superhero" is a song by American singer and songwriter Oliver Tree, released as the first single from his fourth and final studio album Love You Madly Hate You Badly. It was released on October 10, 2025.

== Background ==
After nearly two years of not releasing music, Tree would begin performing demos of unreleased songs at his concerts. On October 4, 2025, Tree performed the song "Superhero" at a Red Rocks concert. Later, on October 10, Tree released "Superhero" along with its music video as the lead single to his fourth album, marking the song as his first official release since 2023. Tree said he recorded the song while traveling across the world, exploring eighty countries and seven continents to record the song and the overall album. "Superhero" was specifically produced in Cape Town, South Africa and London, England.

== Music video ==
The music video features Oliver Tree in numerous settings, such as in a backyard or a sauna, and outfits such as a hunter or in a robe, consuming multiple food items such as dog food or sardines. Tree himself said the video was filmed with a zero dollar budget and that it was filmed in Riga, Latvia.

== Critical reception ==
According to Melodic Magazine, the song "gives a voice to those who feel like theirs is overshadowed, sharing a story of how everyone can have super abilities in their own right". The article described the song's music video as a "typical, thought-provoking Oliver Tree spectacle". Tune Insights describes the song in their article as "different", saying, "it's basically an anthem for all us misfits out there. You know, the black sheep, the outcasts, everyone who's ever felt like they just... don't fit. And maybe that's perfectly fine. The lyrics? They're all about owning that misunderstood energy. Tree wants you to stand tall and treat being different like it's your actual superpower".
