= Love You Madly Hate You Badly =

2026 studio album by Oliver Tree

Studio album by Oliver Tree
- Released: April 24, 2026
- Recorded: 2023–2025
- Length: 47:30
- Label: Alien Boy
- Producers: Oliver Tree; Jacob Dennis

Oliver Tree chronology
Alone in a Crowd (2023)	Love You Madly Hate You Badly (2026)

Singles from Love You Madly Hate You Badly
- 1. "Superhero" Released: October 10, 2025; 2. "Joyride" Released: November 14, 2025; 3. "Flowers" Released: February 20, 2026; 4. "Deep End" Released: March 27, 2026; 5. "All You Ever Wanted" Released: April 10, 2026

Professional ratings
Review scores
Source	Rating
Clash	7/10

Love You Madly Hate You Badly is the fourth studio album by the American singer-songwriter Oliver Tree, released independently through Tree's record label Alien Boy on April 24, 2026. It was supported by five singles: "Superhero", "Joyride", "Flowers", "Deep End", and "All You Ever Wanted". It was the last album released in Tree's lifetime, as he died on June 14, 2026, in a helicopter collision in Rio de Janeiro, Brazil, after performing in his first world tour in São Paulo the previous week.

== Background ==
Tree stated that production for the album began in 2023, right after the release of his third studio album, Alone in a Crowd. Tree traveled across eighty countries and seven continents recording the album while experimenting with new sounds. Before its release, Tree stated that the album would be his "hardest work" and his personal favorite, describing the album as "a reflection of duality, love and hate, chaos and calm, and everything I've learned travelling the world". Tree produced and wrote the entire album. The album was almost scrapped due to complications with Atlantic Records.

After a three-month hiatus, Tree hinted at the album's release date for spring 2026 and began teasing the third single, "Flowers", on social media before releasing the song and its music video on February 20, 2026.

== Promotion ==
The album's lead single, "Superhero", was released alongside a music video on October 10, 2025. The second single, "Joyride", was released on November 14. "Flowers" was released on February 20, 2026; in the song's music video, Tree stars as a pilot. On March 27, "Deep End" was accompanied by a performance video featuring Tree dressed as Limp Bizkit frontman Fred Durst. "All You Ever Wanted" was released on April 10, with its music video filmed at the Didgori Battle Monument in Georgia.

== Tour ==
In May 2026, Tree announced a concert tour in support of the album. Pre-registration for tickets opened on May 4, followed by artist presales on May 6 and general ticket sales on May 8. It was marketed as the "World's First World Tour", with shows scheduled in all seven continents, including a potential concert in Antarctica. sixty-seven dates were announced on May 4, 2026, with a kickoff date on May 30 in Mexico City. The tour ran for four shows before the remainder of the dates were canceled on June 14, 2026, hours after Tree was killed in a helicopter collision.

=== Tour dates ===
World's First World Tour dates
Date (2026)	City	Country	Venue
May 30	Mexico City	Mexico	Pabellón Oeste del Palacio de los Deportes
June 2	Santiago	Chile	Club Subterráneo
June 4	Buenos Aires	Argentina	Niceto Club
June 6	São Paulo	Brazil	Studio Stage

List of cancelled World's First World Tour dates
Date (2026)	City	Country	Venue
July 1	Lisbon	Portugal	LAV - Lisboa ao Vivo
July 3	Madrid	Spain	Mon Madrid
July 4	Barcelona	Spain	Sala Apolo
July 7	Rome	Italy	Eur Social Park
July 8	Milan	Italy	Circolo Magnolia
July 9	Vienna	Austria	Arena Wien
July 11	Trenčín	Slovakia	Trenčín Airfield (Note: Part of Pohoda Festival)
July 12	Budapest	Hungary	Dürer Kert
July 13	Prague	Czech Republic	Lucerna Music Bar
July 15	Feldkirch	Austria	Altes Hallenbad (Note: Part of Poolbar Festival)
July 18	Syðrugøta	Faroe Islands	—N/a
July 28	Nashville	United States	Marathon Music Works
July 29	Atlanta	United States	The Eastern
July 30	Charlotte	United States	The Fillmore Charlotte
August 1	Silver Spring	United States	The Fillmore Silver Spring
August 2	Philadelphia	United States	Franklin Music Hall
August 4	New York	United States	Terminal 5
August 5	Boston	United States	Roadrunner
August 7	Toronto	Canada	History
August 8	Cleveland	United States	Agora Theatre and Ballroom
August 9	Royal Oak	United States	Royal Oak Music Theatre
August 11	Chicago	United States	The Salt Shed (Note: Indoor area of the venue)
August 12	Minneapolis	United States	The Fillmore Minneapolis
August 14	Boulder	United States	Boulder Theater
August 15	Salt Lake City	United States	The Complex
August 17	Portland	United States	Roseland Theater
August 18	Seattle	United States	The Showbox
August 21	Santa Cruz	United States	Quarry Amphitheater
August 22	Oakland	United States	Fox Oakland Theatre
August 23	Hollywood	United States	Hollywood Palladium
August 25	Phoenix	United States	The Van Buren
August 27	Dallas	United States	The Bomb Factory
August 28	Austin	United States	Stubb's Waller Creek Ampitheater
September 5	Amsterdam	Netherlands	Paradiso
September 6	Brussels	Belgium	Cirque Royal
September 8	Cologne	Germany	Carlswerk Victoria
September 9	Paris	France	Bataclan
September 10	Zurich	Switzerland	Komplex 457
September 12	Munich	Germany	TonHalle München
September 13	Berlin	Germany	Astra Kulturhaus
September 14	Hamburg	Germany	Docks
September 16	Copenhagen	Denmark	Store VEGA
September 18	Warsaw	Poland	Progresja
September 19	Bratislava	Slovakia	STARS Auditorium
September 21	Bucharest	Romania	Quantic Club
September 22	Sofia	Bulgaria	Pirotska 5 Event Center
September 24	Glasgow	Scotland	SWG3 TV Studio
September 25	Manchester	England	O2 Ritz Manchester
September 27	London	England	O2 Forum Kentish Town
October 2	Brisbane	Australia	Fortitude Music Hall
October 3	Melbourne	Australia	Forum Melbourne
October 6	Auckland	New Zealand	Auckland Town Hall
October 7	Sydney	Australia	Enmore Theatre
October 8	Adelaide	Australia	Hindley Street Music Hall
October 10	Perth	Australia	Metro City
October 14	Chengdu	China	—N/a
October 16	Chongqing	China	—N/a
October 17	Guangzhou	China	—N/a
October 18	Shenzhen	China	—N/a
October 21	Wuhan	China	—N/a
October 23	Shanghai	China	—N/a
October 24	Hangzhou	China	—N/a
October 25	Beijing	China	—N/a

== Track listing ==
All tracks are arranged, written, and produced by Oliver Tree except where noted.

Love You Madly Hate You Badly track listing
No.	Title	Producer(s)	Length
1.	"My Only Friend"		3:15
2.	"I Need You"		2:45
3.	"Glow On"		2:58
4.	"Sideways"		3:37
5.	"Hey Shorty"		2:54
6.	"Fuck the Whole World"		2:42
7.	"Superhero"	Nickell; Jacob Dennis	3:18
8.	"Death Ray"		3:10
9.	"Dirty"		3:07
10.	"Deep End"		2:30
11.	"Joyride"	Nickell; Dennis	2:30
12.	"Crazy"		2:04
13.	"Someone Else"		3:12
14.	"Halo"		2:39
15.	"All You Ever Wanted"		1:59
16.	"Flowers"		2:28
17.	"How It Ends"		2:22
Total length:			47:30

== Personnel ==
Credits are adapted from Tidal.

- Oliver Tree – vocals, production, vocal production, engineering, mixing
- Jacob Dennis – vocal production, engineering, mixing, production on "Superhero" and "Joyride"
- Randy Merrill – mastering

== Charts ==
Chart performance for Love You Madly Hate You Badly
Chart (2026)	Peak position
Australian Digital Albums (ARIA)	25
UK Album Downloads (Official Charts)	96
