= Oliver Tree =

American musician (1993–2026)

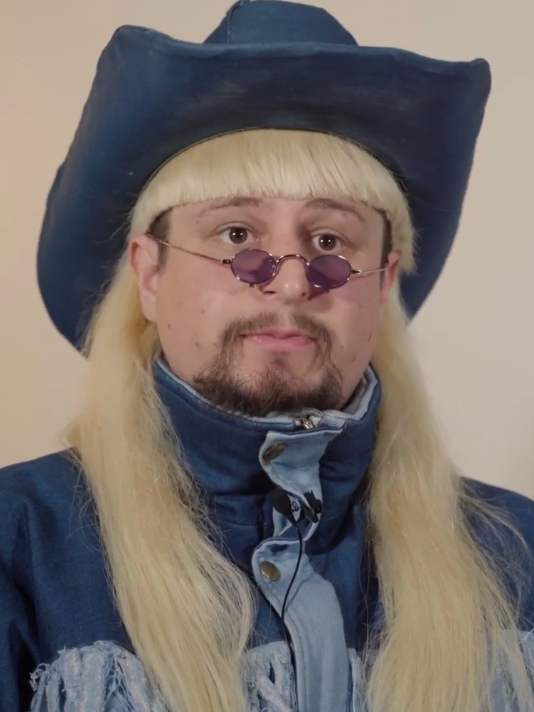
- Tree in 2022
- Born: Oliver Tree Nickell; June 29, 1993; Santa Cruz, California, U.S.
- Died: June 14, 2026 (aged 32); Rio de Janeiro, Brazil
- Resting place: Evergreen Cemetery (Santa Cruz, California)
- Education: California Institute of the Arts (BA)
- Occupations: Singer-songwriter; rapper; record producer; filmmaker; comedian; internet personality; musician
- Years active: 2010–2026
- Works: Discography; songs recorded
- Musical career
- Genres: Alternative rock; indie pop; hip-hop; alternative pop; dance
- Instruments: Vocals; guitar; keyboards; bass
- Labels: Atlantic; R&S; Alien Boy
- Website: olivertreemusic.com

Signature
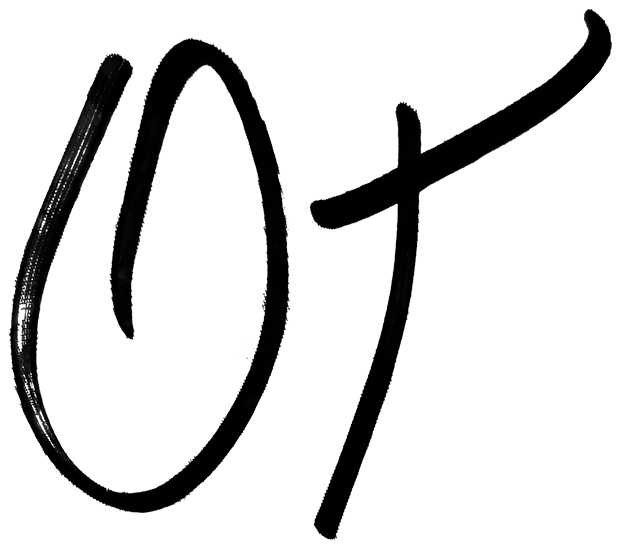

Oliver Tree Nickell (June 29, 1993 – June 14, 2026) was an American singer-songwriter, rapper, and musician. Classified as a "genre-defying musician", he achieved international recognition with his songs "Life Goes On" in 2021 and "Miss You" in 2022.

Born in Santa Cruz, California, Tree signed to Atlantic Records in 2017 after his song "When I'm Down" went viral. He released his debut studio album Ugly Is Beautiful in July 2020, which included the RIAA gold and platinum-certified singles "Alien Boy", "Hurt", "Miracle Man" and "Let Me Down".

Tree released his second studio album, Cowboy Tears, in February 2022; his third studio album, Alone in a Crowd, in September 2023; and his fourth studio album, Love You Madly Hate You Badly, in April 2026. Tree died on June 14, 2026, in a helicopter crash in Rio de Janeiro, Brazil. The cause of the collision is currently under investigation.

== Early life ==
Oliver Tree Nickell was born on June 29, 1993, in Santa Cruz, California, to Jesse Louis Nickell III and Christine Marie (née Begin). During his early childhood, Tree's parents worked as traveling circus performers. He spent much of his upbringing living in a mobile motor home, traveling extensively with the circus until his family permanently settled in Santa Cruz when he was 12 years old. Exposed to instruments that lined the walls of his family's motor home, Tree began taking piano lessons at age three, started songwriting the following year, and claimed to have written a full album by the age of six.

While in middle school, he picked up the guitar and began singing, joining a local ska band called Irony, which served as his first experience performing live. During high school, Tree gravitated toward hip-hop and electronic music, performing at music festivals and working as a DJ under the pseudonym Kryph, and later, Tree. When Tree was 17 years old, he overdosed on drugs at the community art event "Burning Man", and went through an "LSD rebirth".

Following high school, Tree studied business at San Francisco State University for two years. After a brief pause in his early musical career following the release of his 2013 debut EP Demons, he transferred to the California Institute of the Arts. He graduated from the institution in 2016 with a Bachelor of Arts degree in music technology.

== Career ==
=== 2010–2016: Early career and hiatus ===
Tree launched his solo recording career as "Tree" in 2010. By then, he had made presentations for performances such as Skrillex and Zeds Dead. He initially self-released his music, releasing an album called Splitting Branches in early 2013. He sang and played guitar in a ska band called Irony, which was his first experience performing.

In August 2013, Tree signed with London-based R&S Records and released his debut extended play (EP), Demons. The EP gained some recognition after Radiohead lead singer Yorke approved of his cover of their song "Karma Police". Tree eventually found himself on hiatus as he went back to school, studying music technology at the California Institute of the Arts.

=== 2016–2018: Return to music and Alien Boy ===
In March 2016, Tree returned to music, being featured on the song "Forget It" by Getter, a part of his EP, Radical Dude! In November of that year, he made his television debut, performing "Forget It" on the talk show Last Call with Carson Daly.

Shortly after the release of "When I'm Down" by Whethan featuring Tree in October 2016, Tree signed to Atlantic Records. That same year, he graduated from the California Institute of the Arts with a Bachelor of Arts in fine arts. On May 26, 2017, he released "Welcome to LA" as his debut single as Oliver Tree. In February 2018, Tree released his major-label debut EP, Alien Boy, along with the double music video for "All That x Alien Boy". Tree wrote and directed the debut, which took over nine months to create. He spent five months practicing freestyle monster truck jumping at the Perris Auto Speedway and performed all his stunts in the music video. Tree played at major festivals including Lollapalooza and Outside Lands Music and Arts Festival, and performed as a special guest at Coachella Valley Music and Arts Festival where he was subsequently named on LA Weekly's "The Best (and Weirdest) Fashion at Coachella" list in 2017.

He was the supporting act on Louis the Child's Last to Leave Tour (2017) and Skizzy Mars' Are You OK? Tour (2018), and was scheduled to join Lil Dicky and DJ Mustard on the Life Lessons Tour Fall 2018 before it was canceled.

=== 2018–2020: Ugly Is Beautiful and singles ===
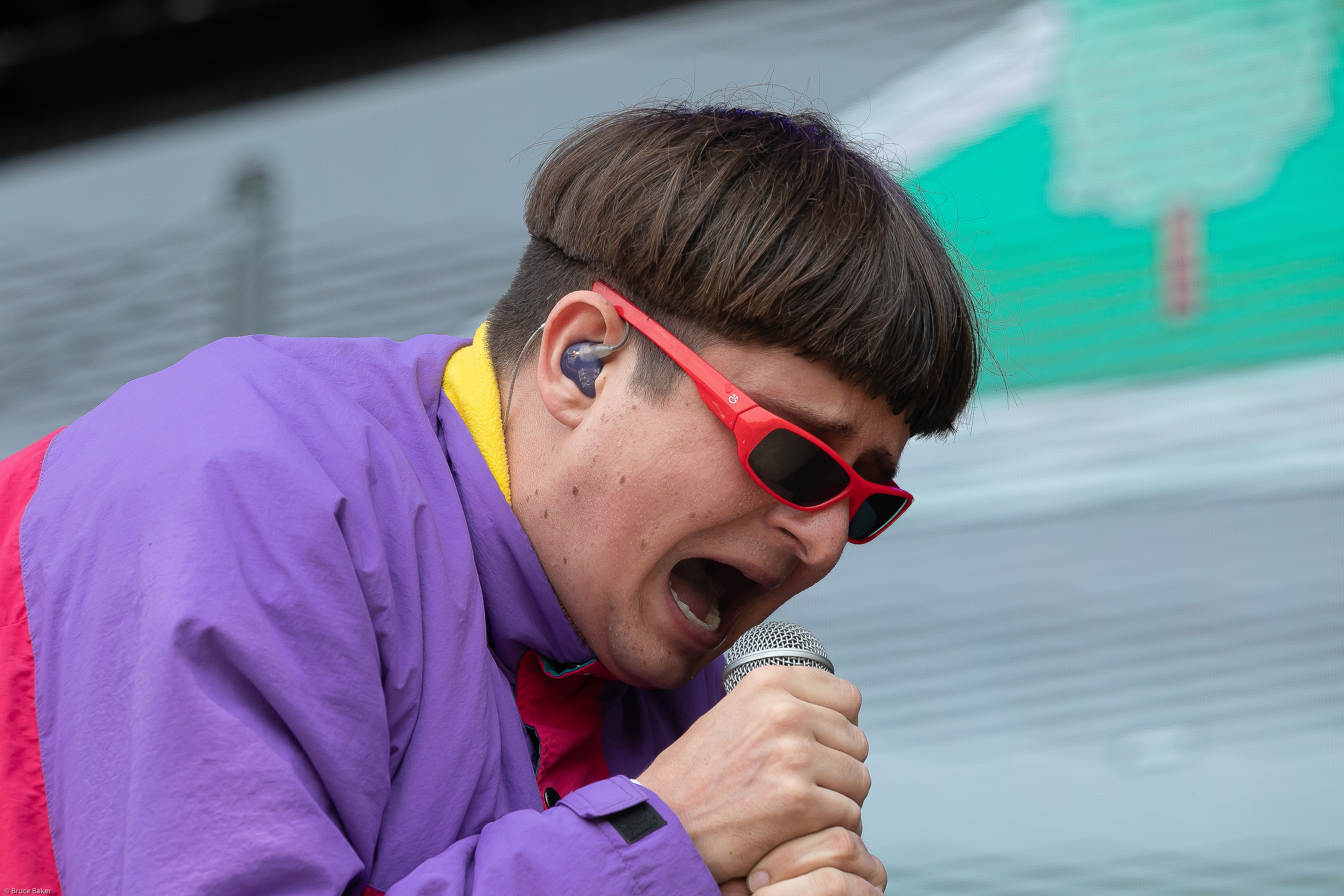
Tree performing at the Laneway Festival in February 2020. Tree was best known for his signature bowl cut.

Throughout 2018 and 2019, Tree released singles that made an appearance on his debut studio album, Ugly Is Beautiful. On December 7, 2018, Tree released his second music video, "Hurt", for a single from the album. He traveled to Ukraine to film the video, which he wrote and co-directed with Brendan Vaughan, an up-and-coming music video director. Tree then embarked on the Ugly Is Beautiful Tour, performing songs that would later make an appearance on the album, including "Joke's On You!" and "Waste My Time". On April 11, 2019, Tree released a standalone single, "Fuck", with the music video being released on the same day.

His fourth music video and single, "Miracle Man", was released on June 7, 2019, with the video reaching 1.3 million views on its first day of release, and Tree also announced his farewell tour, the Goodbye Farewell Tour, which occurred from September to November 2019.

On December 6, 2019, Tree released "Cash Machine", a single accompanied by a music video. Together with the single, Tree announced his debut album, Ugly Is Beautiful, and announced that the album would be released on March 27, 2020. On March 25, 2020, Tree posted on Twitter that due to the COVID-19 pandemic, Ugly Is Beautiful would not be released on time. However, on May 19, the album's official release date was revealed to be June 12. On June 8, 2020, Tree announced his decision to delay Ugly Is Beautiful for a second time, this time to July 17. He stated that, because of the issues of racism and police violence against black people after the murder of George Floyd, he "did not believe it was an appropriate time" to release the album when "much bigger things" deserved attention. Ugly Is Beautiful was released on July 17, 2020.

=== 2021–2022: Deluxe editions, collaborations, and breakthrough ===
Despite claiming that he was retired, he released the single "Out of Ordinary" on February 4, 2021, announcing the deluxe edition of Ugly Is Beautiful. On May 28, 2021, Tree released a deluxe version of his debut album titled Ugly Is Beautiful: Shorter, Thicker & Uglier, from which the song "Life Goes On" gained popularity.

On January 12, 2022, Tree released the single "Cowboys Don't Cry" and the single "Freaks & Geeks" on February 4, both from his second studio album, Cowboy Tears. Cowboy Tears was released on February 18, 2022. On May 20, 2022, Tree released a single, "I Hate You", followed by another single, "Placeholder", on July 15. He also announced a tour to accompany the album.

=== 2023–2026: Alone in a Crowd and Love You Madly Hate You Badly ===
Tree in 2023

On March 3, 2023, Tree released his first single of 2023, "Here We Go Again", with DJ and record producer David Guetta. He followed the release with a single titled "Bounce", released on June 20. The same day, he played a show at the Red Rocks Amphitheatre near Morrison, Colorado and announced that this song was the first single released that would be featured on his third studio album, Alone in a Crowd. On July 17, Tree announced that his Alone in a Crowd World Tour would occur from October 2023 to February 2024. He would be scheduled to perform in Australia with American rapper Sueco, Europe and the United Kingdom with Tommy Cash, and the United States with rock band Fidlar. On July 21, he released his second single from the album, "One & Only". He collaborated with upcoming underground dance music group Super Computer for his third single, "Essence", which was released on September 1, 2023. On September 15, a fourth single was released, "Fairweather Friends". Alone in a Crowd was released two weeks later on September 29, 2023. In October 2025, Tree released the single "Superhero" as the lead single to his album Love You Madly Hate You Badly.

On April 9, 2026, it was announced that Love You Madly Hate You Badly would be released on April 24, 2026, after many delays. Tree also announced that he had left Atlantic Records to release the album independently under his own imprint, Alien Boy Records. The album was released on April 24, 2026. On May 4, 2026, Tree announced "The World's First World Tour" (also referred to as the "Love You Madly Hate You Badly" world tour), a venture scheduled to span seven continents, encompassing over 70 shows across 30 countries throughout the remainder of the year. The tour commenced on May 30, 2026, in Mexico City, with a final performance in São Paulo on June 6.

== Personal life and death ==
Tree and singer-songwriter Melanie Martinez began dating in 2019; the two separated amicably in June 2020. In 2022, he said that he was "exploring polyamory".

In June 2026, Tree was in Brazil for his first world tour, supporting his fourth studio album Love You Madly Hate You Badly; he performed in São Paulo on June 6. Tree died along with five others (including the Argentine YouTuber Gaspi and film director Lucas A. Vignale) on June 14, following an aerial collision that occurred at Recreio dos Bandeirantes in Rio de Janeiro. As of June 15, 2026, the cause of the accident is still under investigation.

== Discography ==
- Ugly Is Beautiful (2020)
- Cowboy Tears (2022)
- Alone in a Crowd (2023)
- Love You Madly Hate You Badly (2026)

== Filmography ==
=== Television ===
| Year | Title | Role | Notes |
|---|---|---|---|
| 2019 | The Late Late Show with James Corden | Himself | |
| 2020 | The Late Show with Stephen Colbert | Himself | |
| 2022 | Jimmy Kimmel Live! | Himself | |
| 2023 | Royal Crackers | Zane | |
| 2025 | Paul American | Himself | Episode: "Episode 3" |

=== Film ===
| Year | Title | Role | Notes |
|---|---|---|---|
| 2025 | Paradise Records | Bobby | |

== Awards and nominations ==
| Year | Award | Category | Result | Ref(s) |
|---|---|---|---|---|
| 2020 | Guinness World Record | Largest Kick Scooter | Won | |
| 2022 | Kids' Choice Awards | Favorite Social Music Star | Nominated | |
| 2022 | Berlin Music Video Awards | Most Trashy | Nominated | |
| 2023 | Kids' Choice Awards | Favorite Social Music Star | Nominated | |
| 2023 | Berlin Music Video Awards | Most Trashy | Nominated | |
