= Whethan =

American DJ and producer

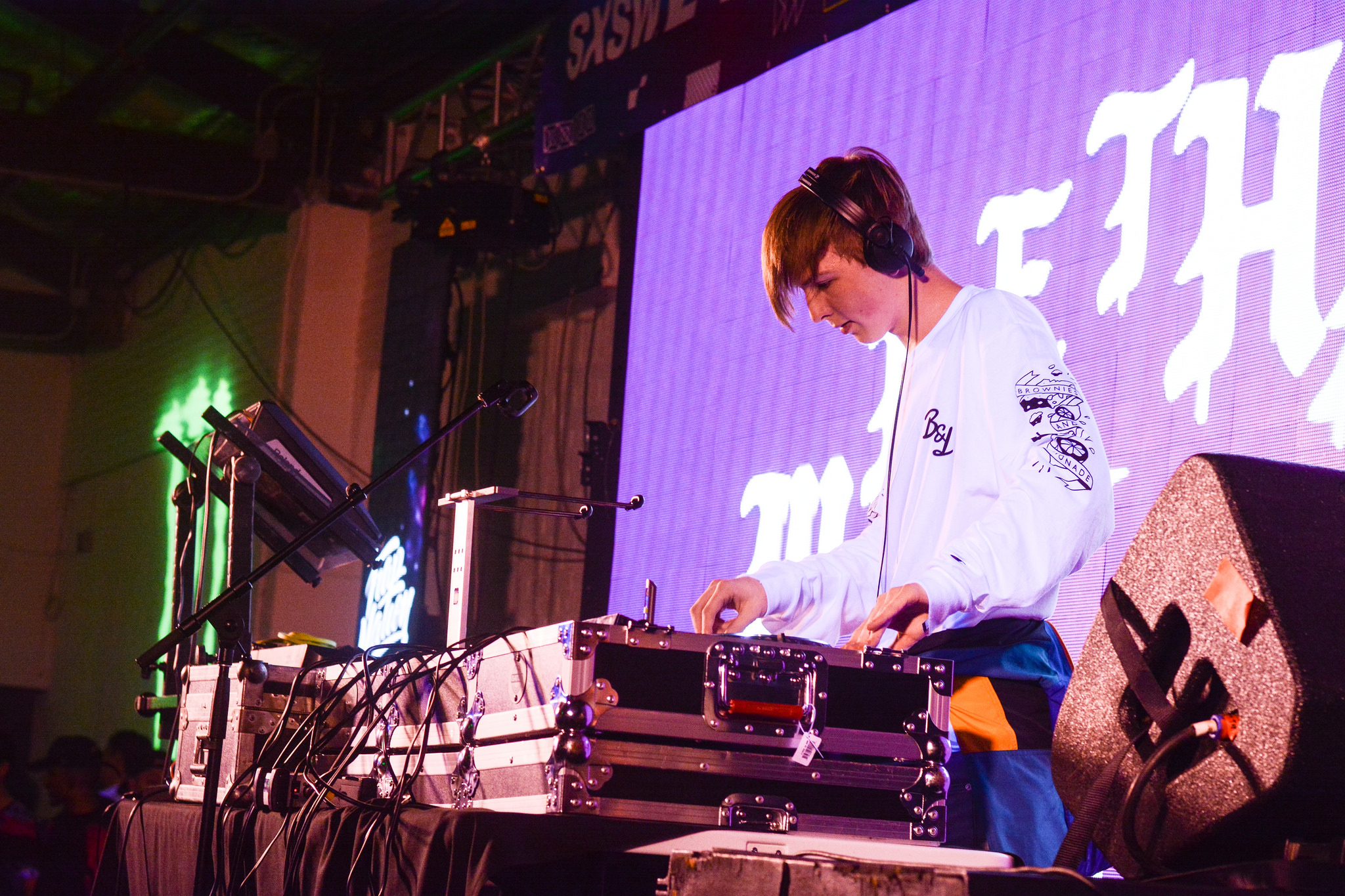
- Whethan performing at SXSW in 2017

Background information
- Also known as: Wheathin
- Born: Ethan Snoreck; May 25, 1999 (age 27); Chicago, Illinois, US
- Genres: Electronic; future bass; hyperpop; electropop; rap
- Occupations: DJ; music producer
- Years active: 2015–present
- Labels: Atlantic; Big Beat; Wallflower Records
- Website: whethan.com

Ethan Snoreck (born May 25, 1999), better known by his stage name Whethan (formerly Wheathin), is an American DJ and music producer from Chicago. He gained recognition after his 2022 single "Lock It Up", and the remix of the track "XE3" by Mssingno, which as of March 2025 has garnered over 15 million plays on SoundCloud.

== Early life ==
Ethan Snoreck was born on May 25, 1999, in Chicago, Illinois. Snoreck attended Carl Sandburg High School from his freshman year until the first semester of his senior year. In May 2017, Whethan left high school early to tour with The Chainsmokers. He returned just long enough to attend his graduation ceremony at which he gave the entire school a preview of his unreleased work.

He first began releasing house music under his real name Ethan Snoreck, but became known as “Wheathin” because one of his early productions was a remix of a Wheat Thins jingle, which he created to prove to his friends that he could make music. The snack brand asked him to change his name in 2016. He chose Whethan. He started producing music by 'messing around' on Garage Band on his iPad. He first became interested in music when he began rapping with his friend Trevor in 6th and 7th grade. Since then he listened to well-known musicians such as Daft Punk, Skrillex, and Deadmau5.

When he was 16 years old, he was recognized as the youngest ever producer to release a record on Australian EDM label, Future Classic. He later caught the attention of dubstep pioneer and Owsla-founder, Skrillex.

== Career ==
Whethan often incorporates a mix of indie future synths with electropop in his songs. His main influence is Flume, considered one of the pioneers of the future bass movement.

He frequently collaborated with American singer-songwriter Oliver Tree. The duo have released singles titled "All You Ever Talk About", "When I'm Down", "Enemy", "Do You Feel Me?" and "Freefall" together. Whethan has also released "Can't Hide" and "Savage", featuring Ashe and Flux Pavilion and MAX, respectively. An official music video was released for the song "Can't Hide" which has over 2 million SoundCloud plays. The song also debuted at number one on Billboard's Spotify Viral 50 chart.

Whethan performed at SXSW music festival in March. He will also be performing at BUKU Music + Art Project festival, which fuses electronic music, hip hop and indie rock. Whethan toured with trap artists Flosstradamus in November alongside fellow DJs Slushii, Towkio, and Gent & Jawns.

In 2018, Whethan collaborated with pop singer Dua Lipa on the song "High", which was featured in the film Fifty Shades Freed. In March of the same year, he released the single "Be Like You" featuring Broods.

In 2020, he was set to perform at the Ultra Music Festival in Miami, but the festival was canceled due to the COVID-19 pandemic.

In 2022, he co-wrote the single "High" with The Chainsmokers.

== Discography ==
=== Albums ===
List of albums
Title	Details
Fantasy	Released: October 16, 2020; Label: Atlantic; Format: Digital download
Midnight	Released: April 29, 2022; Label: Atlantic; Format: Digital download

=== Extended plays ===
List of extended plays
Title	Details
Life of a Wallflower Vol. 1	Released: November 9, 2018; Label: Big Beat; Format: Digital download

=== Singles ===
==== As lead artist ====
Year	Title	Peak chart positions	Certifications
Year	Title	US Dance	Certifications
2016	"Can't Hide" (featuring Ashe)	—	
2016	"When I'm Down" (with Oliver Tree)	—	RIAA: Gold
2016	"Savage" (with Flux Pavilion and Max)	29	
2017	"All You Ever Talk About" (with Oliver Tree )	—	
2017	"Love Gang" (featuring Charli XCX)	—	
2017	"Good Nights" (featuring Mascolo)	—	RIAA: Gold
2017	"Sleepy Eyes" (with Elohim)	—	
2017	"Enemy" (with Oliver Tree)	—	
2017	"Aftertaste" (featuring Opia)	—	
2018	"Be Like You" (featuring Broods)	39	
2018	"Superlove" (featuring Oh Wonder)	48	
2018	"Radar" (featuring Honne)	40	
2019	"Win You Over" (with Bearson featuring Soak)	—	
2019	"Let Me Take You" (with Jeremih)	44	
2019	"Summer Luv" (with The Knocks featuring Crystal Fighters)	—	
2020	"Stay Forever" (featuring Strfkr)	—	
2020	"All In My Head" (featuring grandson)	—	
2020	"Upside Down" (featuring Grouplove)	—	
2020	"So Good" (featuring bülow)	—	
2020	"Hurting on Purpose" (featuring K.Flay)	—	
2020	"Freefall" (featuring Oliver Tree)	—	
2021	"Warning Signs" (featuring Kevin George)	—	
2021	"Think You Right" (featuring Ericdoa and Glaive)	47	
2022	"Mental" (featuring Slump6s and Glaive)	—	
2022	"Complicated" (featuring Aldn and 8485)	—	
2023	"Money on the Dash" (with Elley Duhé)	31	
2023	"Sick of Myself" (with Nessa Barrett)	32	
2023	"Midnight Oil" (with Elley Duhé)	—	
"—" denotes a recording that did not chart or was not released.

==== As featured artist ====
Title	Year
"Falling (Whethan Redo)" (Opia featuring Whethan)	2016
"Do You Feel This Way" (Kailee Morgue featuring Whethan)	2018
"Every Step That I Take" (Tom Morello featuring Portugal. The Man and Whethan)	2018
"Hurts" (Wafia featuring Louis The Child and Whethan)	2019
"Juicy" (NVDES featuring Whethan)	2020
"No Place Is Too Far" (San Holo featuring Whethan and Selah Sol)	2023
"Cruise Control" (Lyn Lapid featuring Whethan)	2024

=== Other charted songs ===
Year	Title	Peak chart positions	Album
Year	Title	US Dance	Album
2018	"High" (with Dua Lipa)	12	Fifty Shades Freed
2022	"Lock It Up" (featuring Yeat, Midwxst and Matt Ox)	25	Midnight

=== Remixes ===
Year	Title	Artist
2015	"XE3" (Wheathin Turn)	Mssingno
2015	"It's Strange" (Whethan Remix)	Louis the Child (featuring K.Flay)
2015	"Suicide" (Wheathin Remix)	Midnight to Monaco
2015	"City of the Rose" (Wheathin Remix)	TYuS
2016	"Falling" (Whethan Redo)	Opia
2016	"Pillowtalk" (Bearson & Whethan Remix)	Zayn
2016	"Sensations" (Whethan Remix)	Elohim
2016	"Blasé" (Whethan Remix)	Ty Dolla Sign (featuring Future, Rae Sremmurd)
2016	"10 Victoria's Secret Models" (Whethan Remix)	MAX
2016	"Send Them Off" (Whethan Remix)	Bastille
2017	"Crush" (josh pan & Whethan Remix)	(Yuna featuring Usher)
2017	"Perfect Places" (Whethan Remix)	Lorde
2018	"Stains" (Whethan Bootleg)	Brockhampton
2018	"Pretty Girl" (Whethan Turn)	Clairo
2018	"Deja Vu" (Whethan Remix)	Post Malone (featuring Justin Bieber)
2018	"SICKOMODE" (Skrillex Remix) (Whethan Turn)	Travis Scott
2019	"OVERDUE" (Whethan Bootleg)	Travis Scott, Metro Boomin
2020	"Stadium Rave" (Whethan Turn)	SpongeBob SquarePants
2020	"Claws" (Whethan Remix)	Charli XCX
