= Umru =

American musician (born 1999)

umru
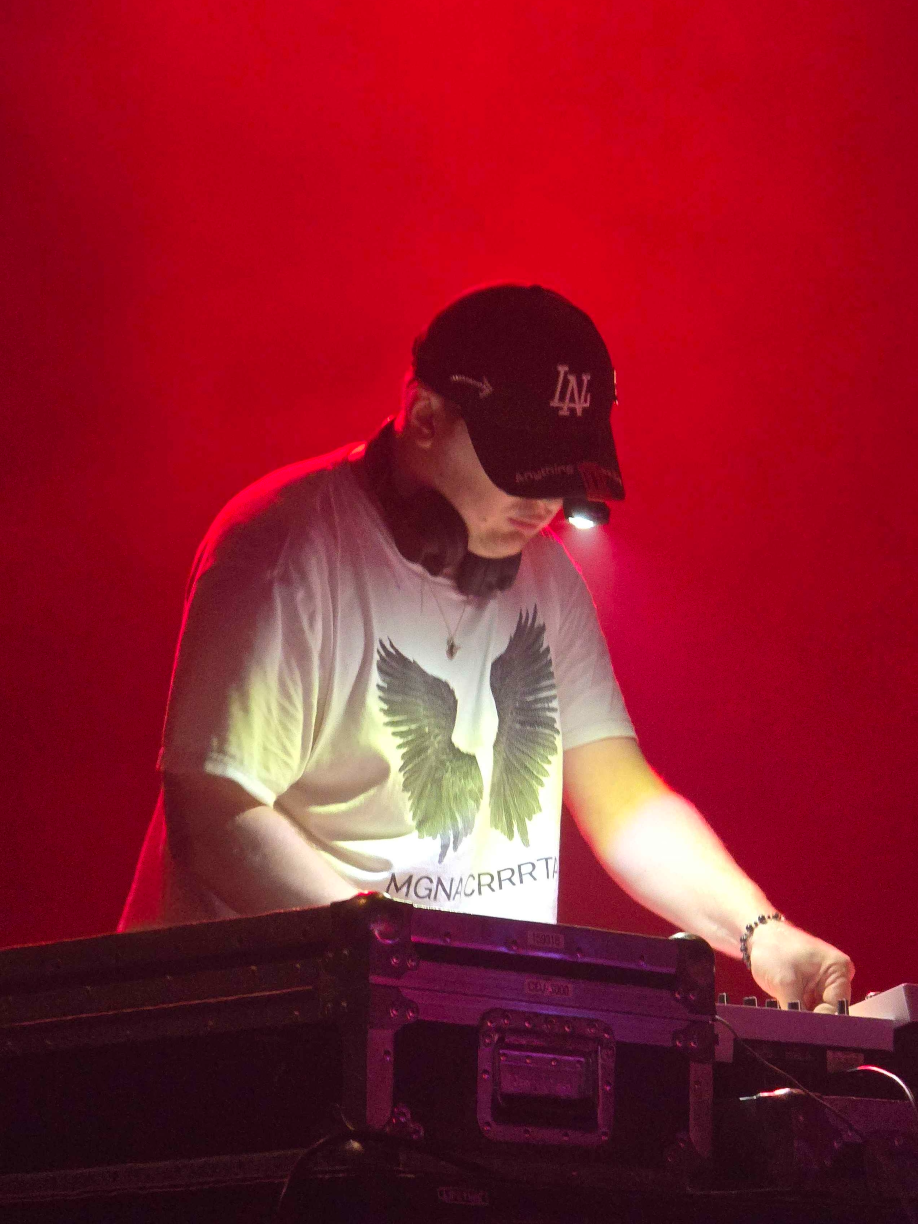
- Umru opening for Underscores in 2026

Background information
- Born: Jaan Umru Rothenberg; April 2, 1999 (age 27); New York City, U.S.
- Origin: Brooklyn, New York, U.S.
- Genres: Pop; hyperpop
- Occupations: Musician; DJ; record producer
- Works: Umru discography
- Years active: 2016-present
- Labels: PC Music; LuckyMe; SONG Music LLC; Atlantic; Lakeshore; EMI; RCA; Trekkie Trax
- Partner: Petal Supply

Jaan Umru Rothenberg (born April 2, 1999), known mononymously as Umru, (Note: Stylized as umru (all lowercase)) is an American musician, DJ, and record producer. To date, he has released 3 EPs and numerous singles and remixes.

His first major breakthrough came in 2017 with production on Charli XCX's song "I Got It" from her mixtape Pop 2. He gained a strong following within the experimental music community via works with record labels such as PC Music, including many compilation albums from the label, and collaborations with artists such as Underscores, Dorian Electra, 100 Gecs, Alice Longyu Gao, and Tinashe. He is considered an influential figure in the hyperpop scene.

== Early life ==
Jaan Umru Rothenberg was born on April 2, 1999 in New York City to a Jewish father, music and philosophy professor David Rothenberg, and an Estonian mother Jaanika Peerna, who is an artist. He spent a year in Estonia for school when he was seven, but otherwise was raised in Brooklyn, New York, where he still lives today. He played drums in elementary school, and took up music production after becoming a fan of various electronic music producers such as Mr. Carmack, Sam Gellaitry, and Cashmere Cat. He began making mashups on Ableton, using his father's old laptop, at the age of 10. He performed regularly in Brooklyn music clubs prior to being noticed by record labels. Umru attended City University of New York from 2017 to 2021, rooming with the musician Underscores, designer Tiam Schaper and illustrator Emile Fortune.

== Career ==
=== Music releases ===
Umru spent much of his teenage years connecting with other DJs and music producers via the Internet. His first remixes were uploaded via SoundCloud. In 2017, he was discovered by British producer and PC Music label founder A. G. Cook, with whom he began producing for artists such as the British singer Charli XCX. His first major production credit was an appearance on her 2017 mixtape Pop 2, on the song "I Got It".

In November 2018, he released his debut EP Search Result on Cook's PC Music label featuring artists such as Laura Les from 100 gecs, Lewis Grant & Ravenna Golden. In March 2022, he released his second EP Comfort Noise on PC Music, featuring Tommy Cash, Rebecca Black, 645AR & others.

Following the suspension of new releases on PC Music in 2024, his third EP Matter of Time was released in April 2025 on the Scottish label LuckyMe, featuring collaborations with Jacques Greene, Nikki Nair & Warpstr. Later in the same month, he also released a collaborative single, "Poplife" with Underscores.

He is a frequent collaborator of and producer for artists associated with the hyperpop scene & experimental pop, such as Ericdoa, Laura Les and Dylan Brady from 100 gecs, Gupi and Fraxiom from Food House, Alice Longyu Gao, Ninajirachi, Chase Icon and Petal Supply.

=== Other ventures ===
In May 2018, Umru created the Minecraft event space Open Pit Presents with graphic designer Max Schramp and other friends. The group started with a birthday party event for Schramp, then went on to host events such as Coalchella, Fire Fest, Mine Gala, Square Garden, and Lavapalooza throughout 2018-2020, featuring the artists Anamanaguchi, 100 gecs, Y2K, and numerous others. Some of these virtual events were done in collaboration with record labels such as Atlantic Records, PC Music, and Bitbird.

In 2019, the lead organizers of Open Pit (Umru, Max Schramp and Emma Segal-Grossman) started a design firm called Parent Company, which has had clients such as Rina Sawayama, Elton John, Chuck Sutton, Balenciaga, Charli XCX, Kim Petras, Laura Les, A. G. Cook, Namasenda, Dorian Electra, Alice Longyu Gao and Mura Masa. In September 2020, Umru started a New York-based music label with Parent Company called SONG Music LLC, which was billed as an "antiindustry record label and music distroverification platform."

Umru was hired in 2022 by the sample distribution platform Splice to curate a sample label called Moment with Cody Mar (Daywaiter). The label launched in April 2022 with a pack from Underscores, and has continued with Umru "commissioning packs from all the talented sound designers I know."

== Artistry ==
Although his sound is often labeled as hyperpop, Umru prefers not to be labelled with any specific music genres, or rather simply as a pop musician. Allison Harris from Ringtone Mag called his music "so fascinating", stating that a few of his songs portray "a sense of vulnerability" and that "[he’s] driven by creating something completely unique, although he does cite what he refers to as “obvious influences” to his music, one of them being the legendary SOPHIE."

== Philanthropy ==
Aside from his musical projects, Umru has also been a vocal supporter of the Palestinian liberation movement in the United States. In 2023 he, along with other musicians, pulled his music from German streaming platform HÖR after its apparent censorship of clothing and other depictions of support for Palestine in the midst of the resurging Israel-Palestine Conflict. He has also performed at several charity events supporting Palestinians, raising funds for mutual aid and a variety of other services. In 2025, he signed a pro-Palestine petition from Artists Against Apartheid after the cancellation of a Kehlani concert due to her vocal opposition to the Palestinian genocide.

== Discography ==
=== EPs ===
Title	Details
Search Result	Released: 23 November 2018; Label: PC Music; Formats: Digital download, streaming
Comfort Noise	Released: 25 March 2022; Label: PC Music; Formats: LP, CD, digital download, streaming
Comfort Noise (Music Inspired by the Motion Picture)	Released: 5 August 2022; Label: PC Music; Formats: CD, digital download, streaming
Records (Remixes) (with Chase Icon)	Released: 26 September 2024; Label: Self-released; Formats: Digital download, streaming
Matter of Time	Released: 4 April 2025; Label: LuckyMe; Formats: Digital download, streaming
Open! Remixes (with Trekkie Trax Crew, Nextdimensional, and Nakamura Minami [ja])	Released: 8 May 2026; Label: Trekkie Trax; Formats: Digital download, streaming

=== Compilations ===
Title	Details
B2battlepass: Season 1	Released: 2 April 2023; Label: Self-released; Formats: USB, digital download
B2battlepass: Season 2	Released: 6 April 2024; Label: Self-released; Formats: USB, digital download
B2battlepass: Season 3	Released: 29 March 2025; Label: Self-released; Formats: USB, digital download
B2battlepass: London	Released: 2 April 2026; Label: Self-released; Formats: USB, digital download

=== Singles ===
==== As lead artist ====
Title	Year	Album
"For Derg"	2016	Non-album single
"Flat Earth Type Beat" (with Cassiopee and Frstmait)	2016	Non-album single
"Sacrifice" (with Holly)	2017	Non-album single
"Samaritan" (with LXXK)	2017	Non-album single
"Ribbons" (with Sophie Meiers)	2017	Non-album single
"Cellophane" (with Rasha and Sophie Meiers)	2017	Non-album single
"Surcharge" (with Warpstr)	2018	Non-album single
"Windowpane" (with Rasha and Sophie Meiers)	2018	Non-album single
"Movinglikeazombie (Remix)" (with Ericdoa, SEBii, Angelus, Kmoe, Lewis Grant, Savepoint, Tony Velour, Emotegi, D0llywood1, and 4kmirage)	2020	Non-album single
"Ready or Not" (with Melvv and Terror Jr)	2021	Non-album single
"DNA" (with Bloodz Boi and SEBii)	2021	Non-album single
"Hate It, Love It" (with Aj Simons)	2021	Heavenly Creatures
"#SongMusicCypher" (with River Moon, Cali Cartier, Jedwill, Tony Velour, Rodney Chrome, 4kmirage, Yung Skrrt, Andrew Goes to Hell, SEBii, Staple God, TYGKO, Mohawk Johnson, Ando, Petal Supply, Lucy Lohan, Hate Shaliek, Left at London, Fraxiom, Neutra, and William Crooks)	2021	Non-album single
"Iced Lemon Tea" (with Bloodz Boi and William Crooks)	2021	Non-album single
"Honey" (with That Kid)	2021	Non-album single
"Check1" (with Tommy Cash and 645AR)	2021	Comfort Noise
"Heart2" (with Petal Supply and Rebecca Black)	2022	Comfort Noise
"All I Need" (with Fraxiom, Tony Velour, and Hannah Diamond)	2022	Comfort Noise
"Groundbreaker" (with Warpstr)	2023	Non-album single
"Molly" (with River Moon)	2023	Non-album single
"Rhinediva"	2024	Non-album single
"Soulbreakcore"	2024	Non-album single
"Records" (with Chase Icon)	2024	Records (Remixes)
"Matter of Time" (with Warpstr)	2024	Matter of Time
"Sidewinder" (with Safety Trance)	2025	Boys Noize Presents Ones and Zeros
"Touch.Base" (with Xato, 645AR, and Baseck)	2025	Who Was Expecting This?
"1st Light" (with Jacques Greene)	2025	Matter of Time
"Poplife" (with Underscores)	2025	Non-album single
"I Don't Sell (Records Remix)" (with Chase Icon and JEL: The Digital Dream Girl)	2025	Non-album single
"Open!" (with Trekkie Trax Crew [ja], Nextdimensional, and Nakamura Minami [ja])	2026	Open! Remixes
"Lose Control" (with Ouri)	2026	Non-album single
"What You Say" (with Jacques Greene)	2026	Jg
"I Like" (with Bbyafricka and Warpstr)	2026	Non-album single
"LA Girls" (with The Deep and Warpstr)	2026	Non-album single

==== As featured artist ====
Title	Year	Album
"Brood"	2016	V3.0 Ebb & Flow
"Buyer's Remorse" (with Rohaan)	2017	Momentum Pt. 2
"4real" (with 8485 and Petal Supply)	2020	Alpha Testing
"New Light" (with Aj Simons)	2020	Non-album single
"Ghosts N Shit" (with Fraxiom)	2020	Pop Crypt (Skeleton Key)
"White Xmas" (with Silver Sphere, Ericdoa, and Fraxiom)	2020	Pop Caroler's Songbook
"1" (with Petal Supply, Himera, and Trndytrndy)	2021	Non-album single
"Hunted" (with BABii)	2021	MiiROR
"Again&Again" (with Aj Simons and Glasear)	2021	Mutants Vol. 5: Free
"Fastlane" (with Cali Cartier and Yung Skrrt)	2021	Smile Season
"Feelin Like A Million" (with Cali Cartier and Kena)	2021	Smile Season
"Schlüssel" (with Amy Crush)	2021	Non-album single
"Dreams" (with Robél)	2021	Non-album single
"Suki Sugi Replay" (with Golin, Glasear, and Distance Decay)	2022	Non-album single
"Saturate_Demo" (with BABii)	2022	Screamer
"Sepulchre_w/Umru&DJH_WIP" (with BABii and DJH)	2023	Screamer_Edit_Vii
"10 Bad Bitches" (with River Moon, Chase Icon, That Kid, Petal Supply, Warpstr, and Iglooghost)	2023	Non-album single
"Find You" (with DJH and BABii)	2023	Hardcore Will Never Die, and Neither Will You
"#PAI" (with Blankfac3 and o0o)	2024	The Shape of Sound to Come
"All This Time" (with DJH and Ravenna Golden)	2024	909 Worldwide Presents: Beat Go Fun!!
"1-800-FUCKOFF" (with Kimj and Underscores)	2025	Korean American
"Touch.Base (S280F Remix)" (with Xato, 645AR, Baseck, and S280F)	2026	Who Was Expecting These Remixes?
"Follow Me" (with Cecile Believe)	2026	Faces of Death (Original Motion Picture Soundtrack)

=== Remixes ===
Official remixes

Title	Year	Artist(s)
"Damn"	2016	Y2K, Lil Aaron
"Citi Bike"	2016	Lido
"New You"	2017	Kid Froopy
"YPMH"	2018	Catnapp
"5 in the Morning" (Note: Released on a remix EP in Charli XCX's promotional series "#TheMagicHour".)	2018	Charli XCX
"No"	2018	Alison Wonderland (with Kid Froopy)
"Gravity"	2018	X&G, Josh Pan (with Blake Skowron)
"Mine"	2019	Slayyyter
"Anymore"	2019	Lil Aaron, Kim Petras
"Pop Song"	2020	Porridge Radio (with Himera)
"True"	2020	Hannah Diamond
"Ringtone"	2020	100 gecs
"Fuckwit"	2020	Banoffee
"Rich Bitch Juice"	2020	Alice Longyu Gao (with A. G. Cook)
"Six"	2020	Kacy Hill
"Crowd"	2020	Sophie Cates
"Ocean of Tears"	2020	Caroline Polachek
"Aether"	2020	Baauer
"Sympathy"	2021	Perto, Yayoyanoh
"2021"	2021	A. G. Cook
"Soap" (Umru Lullaby)	2021	Aj Simons
"Secretive!"	2021	Ninajirachi, Kota Banks
"Black Ops 2"	2022	Namasenda
"So Clear" (Umru Corrosion)	2022	Hyd
"Firetruck"	2023	F5ve
"Fmuatw"	2023	Brooke Candy
"Locals (Girls Like Us)" (Note: Released by PC Music on the CD "Oh Yeah 1", available at the Personal Computer Market event in New York.)	2023	Underscores, Gabby Start
"Never Again" (Note: Released by PC Music on the CD "Oh Yeah 2", which was also available at the Personal Computer Market event.)	2023	Hannah Diamond (with DJH)
"Friday"	2024	LUCY
"Obsessed"	2024	HorsegiirL (with Dazegxd)
"Sucia" (Umru Liturgy)	2024	Empress Of
"Angel Music"	2025	Ninajirachi, MGNA Crrrta
"Dawn"	2025	Taahliah (with DJH)
"7'Mix" (Umru and Milkfish "2'Mix" Remix)	2026	EQ, Estratosfera, Qiri (with Milkfish)
"Speedrun"	2026	Anysia Kim, Tony Seltzer (with Username)
"☆"	2026	Namasenda, Oklou

Unofficial remixes

Title	Year	Artist(s)
"Call Me Maybe" (Umru's Prom Night Edit)	2018	Carly Rae Jepsen
"OK Boomer"	2019	Jedwill
"Wishlist"	2019	Ruby Bell and Gothjosh (with Gupi)
"Just Like We Never Said Goodbye" (Umru Cover)	2021	SOPHIE
"Good Ones"	2021	Charli XCX (with Cali Cartier, DJ Ramemes, Warpstr, Milkfish, and Mu540)
"Obvious"	2025	Oklou (with DJ Carlozs and DJ Lukinhas)

=== Songwriting and production credits ===
==== Albums ====
(As executive producer)

Year	Title	Artist(s)
2022	Soul Spa	Aj Simons

==== EPs ====
Year	Title	Artist(s)
2020	Feeling Cool And Normal	Fraxiom
2025	Telephone (Remixes)	Elxnce & Cece Natalie (with Jane Remover)

==== Tracks ====
Year	Title	Artist(s)	Album	Writer(s)	Producer(s)
2017	"I Got It" (feat. Brooke Candy, CupcakKe, and Pabllo Vittar)	Charli XCX	Pop 2	Charli XCX, A. G. Cook, CupcakKe, Pabllo Vittar, Jesse St. John Geller	A. G. Cook, umru
2018	"Open My Eyes"	Ravenna Golden & Dorian Electra	Non-album single	Dorian Electra, Dylan Brady, Ravenna Golden, Umru	Dylan Brady, umru
2019	"2 Fast"	Dorian Electra	Non-album single	Dorian Electra, Bonnie McKee, Mood Killer, Dylan Brady, Socialchair, ABSRDST, umru, Weston Allen, Chester Lockhart, Jesse Saint John	
2019	"Adam & Steve"	Dorian Electra	Flamboyant	Dorian Electra, ABSRDST, Dylan Brady, Umru, Parker Silzer IV, David Stagno	ABSRDST, Dylan Brady, umru
2019	"Click" (feat. Kim Petras and Tommy Cash)	Charli XCX	Charli	Charli XCX, Tommy Cash, A. G. Cook, Dylan Brady, Umru, Theron Thomas	A. G. Cook, Dylan Brady, umru, Nömak
2019	"Click (No Boys Remix)" (feat. Kim Petras and Slayyyter)	Charli XCX	Non-album single	Charli XCX, Slayyyter, A. G. Cook, Dylan Brady, Umru, Theron Thomas	A. G. Cook, Dylan Brady, umru, Nömak
2019	"Confused"	William Crooks	Grasstype	William Crooks	underscores, umru
2019	"Sdubid"	Tommy Cash	Non-album single	Tommy Cash, Umru	Tommy Cash, umru
2020	"Tool For You"	Dorian Electra	Flamboyant (Deluxe)	Dorian Electra, ABSRDST, Umru	ABSRDST, umru
2020	"Thirsty (For Love)"	Dorian Electra	Non-album single	Dorian Electra, Dylan Brady, umru, Socialchair, Clarence Clarity, Mood Killer, Count Baldor, Lance Williams, Weston Allen	
2020	"Racecar."	Ravenna Golden	Non-album single	Ravenna Golden, Drew Telly, Umru	umru, Drew Telly
2020	"Fuckwit"	Banoffee	Look At Us Now Dad	Banoffee, Umru	Banoffee, Yves Rothman, umru
2020	"c2.0"	Charli XCX	How I'm Feeling Now	Charli XCX, A. G. Cook, Tommy Cash, Dylan Brady, Umru, Theron Thomas	A. G. Cook
2020	"Scaredofthedark"	William Crooks	Thunderbird	William Crooks	umru
2020	"King Tap"	Cali Cartier	Cali Cartier Best Dog	Cali Cartier, Yung Skrrt, Umru	umru, Yung Skrrt
2020	"Give Great Thanks"	Dorian Electra	My Agenda	Dorian Electra, Clarence Clarity, Socialchair, Umru	Socialchair, umru, Clarence Clarity
2020	"Oweme"	SEBii	Non-album single	SEBii	SEBii, umru
2020	"Minecraft Baby" (feat. Ana Kennedy)	I'm Rylee	Non-album single	I'm Rylee, Ana Kennedy, Knapsack, Umru	umru, Knapsack
2020	"Cishets (I Don't Want It At All)"	Fraxiom	Feeling Cool And Normal	Fraxiom, Umru	umru
2020	"Burnout"	Fraxiom	Feeling Cool And Normal	Fraxiom, Lewis Grant	umru
2020	"This Guitar"	Fraxiom	Feeling Cool And Normal	Fraxiom, Underscores	umru, underscores (add.)
2020	"Fly With Ü"	Fraxiom	Feeling Cool And Normal	Fraxiom	umru, Gupi
2020	"Edgelord" (feat. Rebecca Black)	Dorian Electra	My Agenda	Dorian Electra, Rebecca Black, Full Tac, Umru, Weston Allen	Dorian Electra, umru, Full Tac
2020	"F The World" (feat. The Garden, Quay Dash, and D0llywood1)	Dorian Electra	My Agenda	Dorian Electra, D0llywood1, Quay Dash, The Garden, Count Baldor, Dylan Brady, Mood Killer	Dylan Brady, d0llywood1, umru
2020	"Iron Fist" (feat. Faris Badwan)	Dorian Electra	My Agenda	Dorian Electra, Clarence Clarity, Count Baldor, Mood Killer, Umru	Dorian Electra, Clarence Clarity, Count Baldor, umru
2020	"Ftfoi"	Recovery Girl	Recovery Girl & Friends (Mixtape)	Galen Tipton, Bean Boy, Umru	umru, Bean Boy
2020	"Daddy Don't Take My Phone"	Kitten	Personal Hotspots	Chloe Chaidez, David Stagno, Parker Silzer IV, Umru, Gupi	Parker Silzer IV, David Stagno, Gupi, umru
2020	"Quiet Night" (feat. Cali Cartier & William Crooks)	Tony Velour	Merryfuckmymind	Tony Velour, Cali Cartier, William Crooks	umru
2021	"Ran Out Of Love"	Angelus	Non-album single	Angelus	umru, Iglooghost, Kai Whiston, Slappy (add.)
2021	"Zuccenberg" (feat. $uicideboy$ & Diplo)	Tommy Cash	Moneysutra	Tommy Cash, $uicideboy$, Diplo, Umru	Diplo, umru
2021	"Exchange"	Exodus1900	*Organic Silhouette	Exodus1900	umru
2021	"Jealous of the Stars"	SEBii	VVBLUE	SEBii	kimj, skress, Glasear, umru
2021	"Xtra Dry"	Haiyti	Speed Date	Haiyti, Dillon Jaymes, Umru	umru, Dillon Jaymes
2021	"Happy"	Dorian Electra & 645AR	Non-album single	Pharrell Williams	Count Baldor, umru
2021	"I Got Barss"	SEBii	VVRED	SEBii	vvspipes, kimj, zetra, umru
2021	"Play With My Heart"	Hannah Diamond	Tetris Beat: Essentials, Vol. 1	Hannah Diamond, Oscar Pollock	umru
2021	"Niemandsland"	Haiyti	Speed Date	Haiyti, DJH, Umru	DJH, umru
2021	"Sex"	Stef	Non-album single	Stef	umru, Glasear
2021	"Danny Phantom"	Tamino404	Schlecte Luft	Tamino404	odece, umru
2021	"Jealous"	That Kid	Comedown	That Kid	umru
2021	"The One"	Hyd	Hyd	Hayden Dunham, A. G. Cook, Umru	umru, A. G. Cook
2021	"Iron Fist (Alice Glass Remix)" (feat. Faris Badwan)	Dorian Electra	My Agenda (Deluxe)	Dorian Electra, Faris Badwan, Alice Glass, Clarence Clarity, Count Baldor, Mood Killer, Umru	Clarence Clarity, Count Baldor, umru, Alice Glass, Jupiter Keyes
2021	"Edgelord (Johann Sebastian Bach Remix)" (feat. The Joker, Savage Ga$p, and Rebecca Black)	Dorian Electra	My Agenda (Deluxe)	Dorian Electra, Savage Ga$p, Rebecca Black, Full Tac, Umru, Weston Allen	umru, Full Tac
2021	"Give Great Thanks (Count Baldor Edit)"	Dorian Electra	My Agenda (Deluxe)	Dorian Electra, Socialchair	Count Baldor, Socialchair, umru, Clarence Clarity
2021	"Boo"	Haiyti	Speed Date	Haiyti, Umru	umru
2021	"2 Phones"	Haiyti	Speed Date	Haiyti, Umru	umru
2022	"Hear You"	Yung Kayo & Eartheater	DFTK	Yung Kayo, Eartheater, Warpstr, Umru	umru, warpstr
2022	"No Rest" (feat. Emotegi)	Aj Simons	Soul Spa	Aj Simons, Emotegi	umru, emotegi (add.)
2022	"Superstar"	Aj Simons	Soul Spa	Aj Simons	umru, warpstr, Himera
2022	"Soul Spa" (feat. Lau)	Aj Simons	Soul Spa	Aj Simons, Lau	umru, vvspipes
2022	"Bambi"	Aj Simons	Soul Spa	Aj Simons	umru, DJH, Himera
2022	"Lose My Cool"	Aj Simons	Soul Spa	Aj Simons, Vincent Möller	umru, espia
2022	"Big Knife"	Ravenna Golden	Ms. Genius	Ravenna Golden	Dylan Brady, umru
2022	"Primadonna"	Ericdoa	Things with Wings	Ericdoa, Umru, FortuneSwan	umru, FortuneSwan
2022	"Telephone Light"	Casey MQ & Petal Supply	Non-album single	Casey Manierka-Quaile, Petal Supply	Casey MQ, umru
2022	"27-04-99"	Kai Whiston	Quiet As Kept, F.O.G.	Kai Whiston	Kai Whiston, Fout List, Ed Petersen, umru (add.)
2022	"Death Sentence"	Mori Calliope	Sinderella	Mori Calliope, DJH, Umru	umru, DJH
2023	"Supernova"	Sophie Cates	Supernova	Sophie Cates, Charlie Shuffler, Groupthink, LAN Party	Charlie Shuffler, LAN Party, umru, Groupthink
2023	"Yes Man"	Dorian Electra	Fanfare	Dorian Electra, Casey Manierka-Quaile	Dorian Electra, Casey MQ, umru, Weston Allen
2023	"Touch Grass"	Dorian Electra	Fanfare	Dorian Electra, Casey Manierka-Quaile, Christy Carey, Kai Whiston, Count Baldor, Weston Allen, Umru	Dorian Electra, Kai Whiston, Weston Allen, Christy Carey, Count Baldor, Casey MQ
2024	"Fácil"	Empress Of	For Your Consideration	Empress Of, Umru, Jarina De Marco	umru
2024	"Sucia"	Empress Of	For Your Consideration	Empress Of, Cecile Believe, Umru, Jarina De Marco	umru
2024	"17chains"	Sophie Cates	Supernova	Sophie Cates, LAN Party, Mickey Wozniak	LAN Party, umru, Mickey Wozniak
2024	"Hostage"	BodyGaard & Liza Blaise	Non-album single	BodyGaard, Liza Blaise	elxnce, pandi, umru
2024	"Go Go Go"	Brooke Candy	Candyland	Brooke Candy, Madge, Umru	umru
2024	"Telephone" (feat. Cece Natalie)	Elxnce	Ridgeway Drive / Blurred Sentimentality	Elxnce, Cece Natalie, Jane Remover, Umru	elxnce, Jane Remover, umru
2024	"Hottie"	Tommy Cash	High Fashion	Tommy Cash, A. G. Cook, Umru	A. G. Cook, umru
2024	"High Fashion"	Tommy Cash	High Fashion	Tommy Cash, Umru, A. G. Cook, Mark Johns	umru, A. G. Cook
2024	"Beat Rock"	Tommy Cash	High Fashion	Tommy Cash, Umru, Yung Skrrt	umru, Sam Rolfes (add.)
2025	"Ur Not Really 'Bout It"	Underscores	Fishmonger (DeadAir Legacy Edition)	Underscores	umru, underscores
2025	"Misidentify"	Cortisa Star	E.M.O. (Evil Motion Overload)	Cortisa Star	umru, DJH
2025	"Paris"	Cortisa Star	E.M.O. (Evil Motion Overload)	Cortisa Star	ELIWTF, umru (add.)
2025	"Bang 2"	Chase Icon	Icon Baby	Chase Icon	warpstr, umru
2025	"Fits"	Cortisa Star	E.M.O. (Evil Motion Overload)	Cortisa Star	umru
2025	"Alot"	Cortisa Star	E.M.O. (Evil Motion Overload)	Cortisa Star	cowboyheaven, umru (add.)
2025	"Up" (feat. Chase Icon)	Cortisa Star	E.M.O. (Evil Motion Overload)	Cortisa Star	umru, warpstr, MsChickenSandwich
2025	"Evil ASF"	Cortisa Star	E.M.O. (Evil Motion Overload)	Cortisa Star	umru, Matt Marvin
2025	"Every Little Thing"	Warpstr	Non-album single	Warpstr	warpstr, umru
2025	"Headphones"	Elxnce	Ridgeway Drive / Blurred Sentimentality	Elxnce, Lucy Lohan, Petal Supply, DJH, Umru	elxnce, umru, Lucy Lohan, Petal Supply, DJH
2025	"Mucho Sexy"	Mia Badgyal	Mucho Sexy	Mia Badgyal	FUSO!, umru
2025	"Hot"	Mia Badgyal	Mucho Sexy	Mia Badgyal	umru, FUSO!
2025	"Starburst"	Danny Brown	Stardust	Danny Brown, Angel Prost, Holly	Holly, umru (add.), warpstr (add.)
2025	"Green Light"	Danny Brown & Frost Children	Stardust	Danny Brown, Lulu Prost, Umru	Frost Children, umru
2025	"Right From Wrong"	Danny Brown & Nnamdï	Stardust	Danny Brown, Nnamdï, Angel Prost, DJH, Umru	NNAMDÏ, DJH, umru
2025	"Party All Week Bitch"	Cortisa Star	Non-album single	Cortisa Star	Frost Children, umru (add.)
2026	"Get Some" (feat. Cortisa Star)	Kim Petras	Pretour	Kim Petras, Cortisa Star, Bayli	Margo XS, Nightfeelings, Porches, umru, Bayli
2026	"I'll Be Gone (Patti Harrison Remix Cut)"	Sasami	Blood on the Silver Screen (Director's Cut)	Sasami, Daniel Aged, Kyle Thomas, Sam KS	Sasami, umru (add.)
2026	"Supervillain"	Angel Money	Contractually Blonde	Angel Money	umru, chloe Scarlett
2026	"放松"	Toxic	Non-album single	Toxic	FearDorian, umru
2026	"Black Belt"	Cortisa Star	Non-album single	Cortisa Star	umru
2026	"El Mundo y Yo"	Akriila	Lucy Miró al Mundo y Notó Que Está Girando	Akriila	Heartgaze, umru
2026	"Strings"	Jimi Somewhere	Non-album single	Jimi Somewhere, Ole Martin Jensen	Milo Orchis, Jimi Somewhere, umru
