= My Agenda =

2020 studio album by Dorian Electra

Studio album by Dorian Electra
- Released: October 16, 2020
- Recorded: January–September 2020
- Genres: Hyperpop; experimental pop; protest-pop; industrial; pop; nu metal; dubstep
- Length: 25:10
- Producers: Dylan Brady; Zakk Cervini; Clarence Clarity; Count Baldor; d0llywood; Full Tac; Gaylord; Chris Greatti; Lil Texas; Mood Killer; Sega Bodega; Socialchair; Lars Stalfors; Umru; Will Vaughan

Dorian Electra chronology
| Flamboyant (2019) | My Agenda (2020) | Fanfare (2023) |

Singles from My Agenda
- 1. "Sorry Bro (I Love You)" Released: May 19, 2020; 2. "Give Great Thanks" Released: July 23, 2020; 3. "Gentleman" Released: August 13, 2020; 4. "M'Lady" Released: August 13, 2020; 5. "Edgelord" Released: September 25, 2020; 6. "My Agenda" Released: October 15, 2020; 7. "Ram It Down" Released: May 14, 2021

Singles from My Agenda (Deluxe)
- 1. "M'Lady (S3RL remix)" Released: August 9, 2021; 2. "Gentleman (d0llywood1 remix)" Released: September 22, 2021; 3. "Barbie Boy (ElyOtto remix)" Released: October 7, 2021; 4. "Iron Fist (Alice Glass remix)" Released: October 15, 2021; 5. "My Agenda (Anamanaguchi remix)" Released: January 25, 2022

My Agenda is the second studio album by American singer-songwriter Dorian Electra, released on October 16, 2020. Promoted by the singles "Sorry Bro (I Love You)", "Give Great Thanks", "Gentleman", "M'Lady", "Edgelord", and the title track, the full project was revealed on September 21, 2020. The album features appearances from Rebecca Black, Faris Badwan, Pussy Riot, Village People, The Garden, Dylan Brady, Clarence Clarity and Quay Dash among others.

A deluxe edition containing seven remixes and four new songs was released on November 5, 2021.

== Background and composition ==
The album was conceived mostly during two writing sessions with Count Baldor and Dylan Brady, one in Las Vegas and another in a castle in Barnstaple. Due to the COVID-19 pandemic Electra recorded most of the vocals in a home studio.

My Agenda is a hyperpop, experimental pop, protest-pop, pop, nu metal, and dubstep album that features elements of heavy metal, glitch pop, techno, baroque pop, trance, bubblegum bass, EDM, happy hardcore, gregorian chant, deconstructed club, trap, hardstyle, shock rock, Europop, hardcore, and viking metal.

The album is a concept album about toxic masculinity and incels as seen "through a queer lens". The title of My Agenda is a reference to the "gay agenda" and the title song is written "from the perspective of a conspiracy theorist who is watching their country being taken over by a gay dictator".

== Critical reception ==
Professional ratings
Review scores
| Source | Rating |
|---|---|
| American Songwriter | 5/5 |
| The Line of Best Fit | 8/10 |
| Loud and Quiet | 7/10 |
| The Observer | 4/5 stars |
| Spectrum Culture | 3.5/5 stars |

My Agenda received mostly positive reviews from music critics. American Songwriter praised My Agenda, giving the project five stars. Commenting on the record's ability to blend political themes, musical experimentation, and pop hooks, the publication noted that "Electra presents a mosaic look on today's cultural confusion while retaining a sense of fun. For example, the project's lead single, 'Sorry Bro (I Love You)', plays with themes of sexuality and gender in a normalizing way that presents homoeroticism as something cute and fun, as opposed to shameful."

The album was ranked as the 48th best album of 2020 by Uproxx and the 16th best by Flood Magazine. The title track was included on Billboard's list of the best LGBTQ songs of 2020.

== Track listing ==
| No. | Title | Writer(s) | Producer(s) | Length |
|---|---|---|---|---|
| 1. | "F the World" (featuring The Garden, Quay Dash, and d0llywood1) | Dorian Electra; Count Baldor; Dylan Brady; Mood Killer; The Garden; Quay Dash; d0llywood1 | Count Baldor; Brady; Lars Stalfors; Umru; d0llywood1 | 3:27 |
| 2. | "My Agenda" (featuring Village People and Pussy Riot) | Electra; Weston Allen; Pussy Riot; Village People | Count Baldor; Will Vaughan | 2:51 |
| 3. | "Gentleman" | Electra; Count Baldor; Brady; Mood Killer | Count Baldor; Brady | 1:42 |
| 4. | "M'Lady" | Electra; Count Baldor; Sega Bodega; Vaughan | Count Baldor; Vaughan; Sega Bodega | 1:28 |
| 5. | "Iron Fist" (featuring Faris Badwan) | Electra; Faris Badwan; Mood Killer | Clarence Clarity; Count Baldor; Umru | 2:30 |
| 6. | "Barbie Boy" (featuring Sega Bodega) | Electra; Sega Bodega | Count Baldor; Sega Bodega | 2:49 |
| 7. | "Sorry Bro (I Love You)" | Electra; Mood Killer | Count Baldor; Brady | 1:27 |
| 8. | "Monk Mode" (Interlude) (featuring Gaylord) | Electra; Brady; Gaylord | Brady | 1:06 |
| 9. | "Edgelord" (featuring Rebecca Black) | Electra; Full Tac; Rebecca Black; Umru; Allen | Full Tac; Umru | 2:11 |
| 10. | "Ram It Down" (featuring Mood Killer, Lil Mariko and Lil Texas) | Electra; Chris Greatti; Lil Mariko; Lil Texas; Mood Killer; Zakk Cervini | Greatti; Lil Texas; Mood Killer; Cervini | 2:32 |
| 11. | "Give Great Thanks" | Electra; Socialchair | Clarence Clarity; Socialchair; Umru | 3:07 |
| Total length: | | | | 25:10 |

My Agenda (Deluxe) track listing
| No. | Title | Writer(s) | Producer(s) | Length |
|---|---|---|---|---|
| 12. | "My Agenda" (Anamanaguchi Remix) (featuring Village People and Pussy Riot) | | | 2:37 |
| 13. | "Gentleman" (d0llywood1 Remix) (featuring Danny Brown) | Electra; Count Baldor; Brady; Mood Killer; d0llywood1; Danny Brown | | 1:54 |
| 14. | "M'Lady" (S3RL Remix) (featuring Kero Kero Bonito) | Electra; Count Baldor; Sega Bodega; Vaughan | Count Baldor; Vaughan; Sega Bodega | 2:35 |
| 15. | "Iron Fist" (Alice Glass Remix) (featuring Faris Badawan) | Alice Glass; Electra; Faris Badwan; Mood Killer | Clarence Clarity; Count Baldor; Umru; Alice Glass; Jupiter Keyes | 3:17 |
| 16. | "Edgelord" (Johann Sebastian Bach Remix) (featuring The Joker, Savage Ga$p and Rebecca Black) | | | 3:05 |
| 17. | "Barbie Boy" (ElyOtto Remix) | | | 2:48 |
| 18. | "Crusader" | Electra; Donatachi | Donatachi | 2:50 |
| 19. | "Strapping Young Lads" | Electra; Clarity; Count Baldor | Clarity; Count Baldor | 3:00 |
| 20. | "1 Pill 2 Pill" | Electra; Sega Bodega | Sega Bodega | 1:39 |
| 21. | "Chainmail" | Sega Bodega; Count Baldor; Vaughan | Vaughan; Allen; Electra; Count Baldor | 3:23 |
| 22. | "Give Great Thanks" (Count Baldor Version) | | | 2:33 |
| 23. | "F the World" (Acoustic) | | | 2:56 |
| Total length: | | | | 58:31 |

== Release history ==
Release dates and formats for My Agenda
| Region | Date | Format | Version | Label | Ref. |
|---|---|---|---|---|---|
| Various | October 16, 2020 | Digital download; streaming | Original | Self-released | |
| Various | January 2021 | LP | Original | Self-released | |
| Various | April 2, 2021 | CD | Original | Self-released | |
| Various | November 5, 2021 | LP; digital download; streaming | Deluxe | Self-released | |
| Various | February 7, 2022 | CD | Deluxe | Self-released | |
