= Sorry Bro =

Sorry Bro may refer to:

- "Sorry, Bro", an episode of How I Met Your Mother, 2009
- Sorry Bro (I Love You), a 2020 song by Dorian Electra
- Sorry Bro!, a 2016 book by Ben Phillips
