= Bootleg (The Garden album) =

Studio album by the Garden
- Released: July 10, 2026
- Genre: Punk rock
- Length: 32:12
- Label: Epitaph
- Producers: Fletcher Shears; Wyatt Shears

The Garden chronology
Six Desperate Ballads (2024)	Bootleg (2026)

Singles from Bootleg
- 1. "Ugly" Released: November 6, 2025; 2. "5 Mile Ponytail" Released: May 14, 2026; 3. "Eve of Nothing" Released: June 16, 2026

Bootleg is the sixth studio album by the American experimental rock duo the Garden. It was released on July 10, 2026 via Epitaph Records. The album will be promoted with a tour in late 2026, featuring artists such as Thaiboy Digital and Ghost Mountain.

== Background ==
The album was self-produced and self-recorded by the band in Los Angeles. In a statement by the band, they stated that the album lacked a cohesive theme, rather being a compilation of tracks each with their own individual meaning or story. Three singles preceded the albums release, "Ugly", "5 Mile Ponytail", and "Eve of Nothing".

== Reception ==
Leah Johnson of Flood Magazine described the record as an "anarchist's dream and a civilian nightmare, built like a moving diorama of a supernatural world set in place with heavy-duty staples." They praised the albums diversity, stating that the album "careens between punchy punk rock and spectral detours that guide us through the band's long-running intrigue into the experimental and—more prominently felt—the paranormal." Sabrina Amoriello of The Concert Chronicles also highlighted the albums diversity, exclaiming that the band "continue embracing the beautifully uncanny instrumentation that has become synonymous with The Garden's identity, stitched together by visceral production the pair meticulously sculpted themselves."

Ava Reynolds of Melodic took summarized the album as "aggressive and vulnerable, chaotic but intentional, nostalgic yet completely unfamiliar." Moreover, believing the album to embrace a heavier 80s-punk sound when compared to past releases by the band, while still retaining the unpredictability the band is known for.

== Track listing ==
All tracks are written by Fletcher Shears and Wyatt Shears.

Bootleg track listing
No.	Title	Length
1.	"Ugly"	2:39
2.	"Pin Drop"	2:23
3.	"5 Mile Ponytail"	2:18
4.	"White Cadillac"	1:53
5.	"Bootleg"	3:25
6.	"A 50's Guys Eyes"	2:32
7.	"Duck and Cover"	1:31
8.	"Eve of Nothing"	2:31
9.	"The Mess"	1:39
10.	"The Kockroach"	2:46
11.	"Down Doggy"	1:05
12.	"Flailing on the Tracks"	2:36
13.	"Banned from Paradise"	2:48
14.	"Hansel and Gretel"	2:06
Total length:		32:12

== Personnel ==
Credits are adapted from Bandcamp.

=== The Garden ===
- Wyatt Shears – bass, guitar, vocals, electronics, production, recording
- Fletcher Shears – drums, vocals, electronics, production, recording

=== Additional personnel ===
- Samur Khouja – mixing, mastering

== Charts ==
Chart performance for Bootleg
Chart (2026)	Peak position
US Top Album Sales (Billboard)	30
