= Quay Dash =

American musician, rapper and transgender activist (born 1993)

- Born: 17 September 1992 (age 33); Bronx, New York, U.S.
- Genres: Hip Hop; Rap
- Occupations: rapper; singer; songwriter
- Years active: 2013–present
- Label: CuntMafia

Quay Dash (born 17 September 1992), is an American rapper, singer, and songwriter. Quay Dash's music incorporates elements of rap, industrial hip-hop, experimental pop, and boom bap. She has also been associated with the hyperpop music scene, having collaborated with artists such as SOPHIE, Sega Bodega, and Dorian Electra. Quay Dash rose to prominence after being discovered by close collaborator and friend Contessa Stuto, releasing her first single "Satan's Angel" in 2013 under Contessa's label, Cunt Mafia. Following a series of additional singles, Quay Dash released her debut EP, "Transphobic," on September 17, 2016.

== Early life and career ==
Quay Dash was born in Alabama but moved to The Bronx, New York as a young child. She grew up in the foster care system, living in group homes and briefly facing homelessness until finally moving in with her sister at age 19. Around this time, she began writing lyrics as an outlet for her frustrations with society. In a 2014 interview, she notes, "It started off as poetry and metaphors [I] wrote out of anger. I don't consider myself a rapper––more like a lyricist." She eventually found refuge in the Brooklyn nightlife and rave scene, a longtime safe haven for LGBTQ+ people. It was at one of these raves that she met her close friend and collaborator, Contessa Stuto, whose label she would later release music under.

Under the mentorship of Contessa Stuto and the Cunt Mafia collective, Quay Dash began performing around Brooklyn, eventually releasing her debut single "Satan's Angel," produced by JX Cannon in 2013. She followed this with the release of "New York Boom Bap," a collaboration with Stuto, and several additional singles ("Ain't Gon' Stop It," "BKLYN," and "Pop Triggaz") under the Cunt Mafia label from late 2013 to mid-2014.

By 2016, Quay Dash had left Cunt Mafia to pursue music independently. That year, she released her debut EP, "Transphobic" on her SoundCloud, which was then re-released by UK label Perth Records in July 2017. The EP received positive reviews, receiving coverage from Pitchfork, The Guardian, and Dazed. Dissatisfied with her lack of creative control, Quay Dash left her new label and returned to making music independently.

In October 2017, Quay Dash released her single "Queen Of This Shit," in collaboration with producer SOPHIE. The song skyrocketed in popularity, later being featured on the soundtrack for HBO's 2019 hit show, Euphoria.

== Personal life ==
Quay Dash has been very open about her identity as a transgender woman. Her music often addresses themes of transphobia or discrimination she has faced, both within the music industry and her personal life. While she has expressed frustration with being pigeon-holed as a "trans artist," Dash also notes the importance of having LGBT representation in rap music, saying, “I'm not putting myself in a box either, but I know that I'm here to represent for people in my community, definitely.”

== Influences ==
Quay Dash has listed Lil' Kim, Remy Ma, Foxy Brown (rapper) as her biggest musical influences.

== Discography ==
=== Extended plays ===
Title	Details
Transphobic	Released: 6 July 2017; Label: Perth; Formats: Digital download, streaming

=== Singles ===
Title	Year	Album
"Satan's Angel"	2013	Non-album singles
"New York Boom Bap" (with Contessa Stuto)	2013	Non-album singles
"Ain't Gon' Stop It"	2013	Non-album singles
"BKLYN"	2014	Non-album singles
"Pop Triggaz"	2014	Non-album singles
"OFF THE BOOKS"	2015	Non-album singles
"You Make Me Cray"	2015	Non-album singles
"Queen of NY"	2016	Transphobic
"Wilin'"	2016	Transphobic
"Squared Toe Leather Boot"	2016	Transphobic
"Feelings"	2016	Transphobic
"Shades On Top Down"	2016	Transphobic
"Satan's Angel Pt. 2"	2017	Satan's Angel - Mixtape
"I Need A Bag"	2017	Satan's Angel - Mixtape
"Decline Him"	2017	Satan's Angel - Mixtape
"Cold Blooded"	2017	Satan's Angel - Mixtape
"Paranoia"	2017	Satan's Angel - Mixtape
"Get Raided"	2017	Satan's Angel - Mixtape
"Why They Mad Tho?"	2017	Satan's Angel - Mixtape
"Queen of This Shit"	2017	Non-album singles
"#1"	2017	Non-album singles
"No Drama"	2018	Non-album singles
"U.A.F.W.M" (with Sega Bodega)	2018	Non-album singles
"New Bitch"	2018	Non-album singles
"You Really Want It?"	2020	Non-album singles
"Bella Don" (with Contessa Stuto)	2022	Non-album singles
"Tears I Cry"	2023	Non-album singles

=== As featured artist ===
Title	Year
"Do That Baby" (Cakes Da Killa featuring Quay Dash)	2015
"Spaces (Remix)" (Dawn Richard featuring Maliibu Miitch and Quay Dash)	2019
"AZADI" (Tallisker featuring Quay Dash)	2020
"F The World" (Dorian Electra featuring The Garden, Quay Dash, and d0llywood1)	2020
"Loser2" (Contessa Stuto featuring Quay Dash)	2023
"Daddy's Pussy" (LIONSTORM featuring Quay Dash)	2023

=== Music videos ===
Title	Year	Director(s)
"Aint Gon Stop It/BKLYN"	2014	Will Brower
"Decline Him"	2017	Serena Jara
