= Flamboyant (album) =

2019 studio album by Dorian Electra

Studio album by Dorian Electra
- Released: July 17, 2019
- Recorded: January 2019
- Genre: Experimental pop; electropop; hyperpop; baroque pop
- Length: 31:08
- Label: Self-released
- Producer: ABSRDST; Dylan Brady; Count Baldor; Diveo; Robokid; Socialchair; umru; Will Vaughan

Dorian Electra chronology
Flamboyant (2019)	My Agenda (2020)

Singles from Flamboyant
- 1. "Career Boy" Released: June 1, 2018; 2. "Man To Man" Released: December 11, 2018; 3. "Flamboyant" Released: April 25, 2019; 4. "Daddy Like" Released: June 5, 2019

Flamboyant is the debut studio album by American singer and songwriter Dorian Electra. The album was self-released by Electra on July 17, 2019. It features a wide range of music genres, primarily pop music, and uses parody to explore ideas of gender and masculinity. Its title is a reclamation of the word flamboyant, which has been used to derogatorily describe gay men but is also an extravagant style of gothic architecture.

The album was promoted by the singles "Career Boy", "Man To Man", "Flamboyant", and "Daddy Like". Multiple music videos were also released for the album, featuring exaggerated portrayals of masculinity, camp outfits, and homoeroticism. A deluxe edition of the album featuring four new tracks and a remix was released on January 17, 2020. The album was well-reviewed by critics, who praised the production, LGBTQ-related lyrics, and Electra's vocal performances.

== Background ==
Dorian Electra first began making music as a student, attending a progressive school that allowed them to hand in songs in place of traditional assignments. During this time, and later at Shimer College in Chicago, Electra made songs on philosophical and academic topics such as Friedrich Hayek and René Descartes. They came to identify with the emotional immediacy of pop music during their time at college, having previously only enjoyed the genre on an ironic level. After graduating, they were hired to make pop-infused educational videos on subjects including sexuality, drag, and history for the feminist outlet Refinery29.

In 2017, Electra appeared on the A. G. Cook-produced song "Femmebot" for Charli XCX's mixtape Pop 2. According to Electra, Charli XCX was the artist that most paved the way for their career, with XCX giving Electra advice on being an independent artist and the two collaborating on the "Femmebot Fantasy" party tour in 2018. According to an article from Tidal, Flamboyant was completed over the course of a week at an airbnb in Las Vegas in January 2019. Paper Magazine states that Electra did not participate in the production or mixing of the record but "carefully orchestrated [its] mood".

== Composition and themes ==
Flamboyant has been described as hyperpop, experimental pop, dance pop and electropop, and it includes elements of genres ranging from heavy metal to new wave and Baroque music. Electra wanted the cover to reflect this range of genres as it incorporates visuals associated with pop music, punk and heavy metal, and appears almost like a portrait of Mozart. The album focuses on themes of masculinity and queerness. Many of its songs deal with gender stereotypes and attempt to view them in a new light. They use parody and theatricality to critique social norms and comment on social justice issues. Electra has called the album "a celebration as much as a critique" and it aims to build up new positive forms of masculinity.

The title of the album is a reclamation of the word flamboyant, which has historically been used to shame effeminate gay men. Electra wanted to play with the etymology of the word to recast it in a positive light. For Electra, its origin as a style of gothic architecture incorporating flame-like designs and bold colors, which eventually came to signify something "bright and colourful that you couldn't look away from", mirrors the modern use of the term to mean "proud, and loud, and out there".

=== Songs ===
"Career Boy" satirizes the hypermasculinity of work bro culture and how capitalism incentivizes overwork. The song was produced by Will Vaughan with a stereotypical EDM sound to represent the intensity of the central "Career Boy" figure. Electra aimed to "[tear apart]" this over-the-top persona while remaining sympathetic to them and ultimately presenting them as a queer character that LGBTQ fans could identify with. In "Daddy Like", Electra wanted to challenge masculine archetypes that fall under the category of "sugar daddy" but also to de-stigmatize people engaged in such relationships. They also wanted to make the term daddy more inclusive by making a fun-sounding song that would make anybody feel like they could be a daddy "regardless of their identity". Paper Magazine considered the track to have "sticky melodies" and direct lyrics, which cover themes of gender and consent.

"Flamboyant"
20-second sample from the song "Flamboyant" showing its maximalist production style, including heavy guitar riffs, autotune and synths

"Emasculate" features the use of wordplay, equivocating between literal and figurative meanings of the term emasculation, and "grungy S&M beats". "Man to Man" subverts the concept of toxic masculinity by suggesting that true masculinity is vulnerable and sensitive. Billboard described the song's sound as "Baroque-pop goes '80s new wave-meets-Prince" and identified the futility of cancel culture as another theme. Vogue Singapore praised Electra's vocals on the song and the "irresistibly catchy hook" with its layered use of synths. "Musical Genius" mixes elements of dubstep and trap with "harpsichord twinkles". The title track "Flamboyant" is an electropop song with maximalist production, incorporating J-pop synths and piano chords, garage rock-inspired guitar riffs, metal drums, whip sounds, and autotuned vocals. The lyrics encompass a commitment to being yourself in defiance of others' judgement.

Gay Times described "Guyliner" as a spiritual successor to "Femmebot" with its use of exaggerated vocal distortions. "Live by the Sword", about living with integrity, sounded like the "backing track for an intergalactic joust" according to Chicago Reader. "Adam & Steve" is a gay rendition of the Christian Genesis story inspired by the homophobic phrase "It's Adam and Eve, not Adam and Steve". It reclaims the phrase to challenge the idea that God does not love gay people. Musically, it contains elements of electronica, 2000s R&B, heavy metal and religious music. It was ranked as the 7th best song of 2019 by Paper Magazine. "Freaky 4 Life" was described as the album's constitution and an "outsider's mission statement" with "pulsating synths and guitar riffs".

=== Music videos ===
The music videos for Flamboyant were noted for their character sketches that parody masculine tropes and their "high-concept visuals". Electra co-directed the videos with their creative partner Weston Ellen, apart from "Career Boy" which was directed by Charlotte Rutherford.

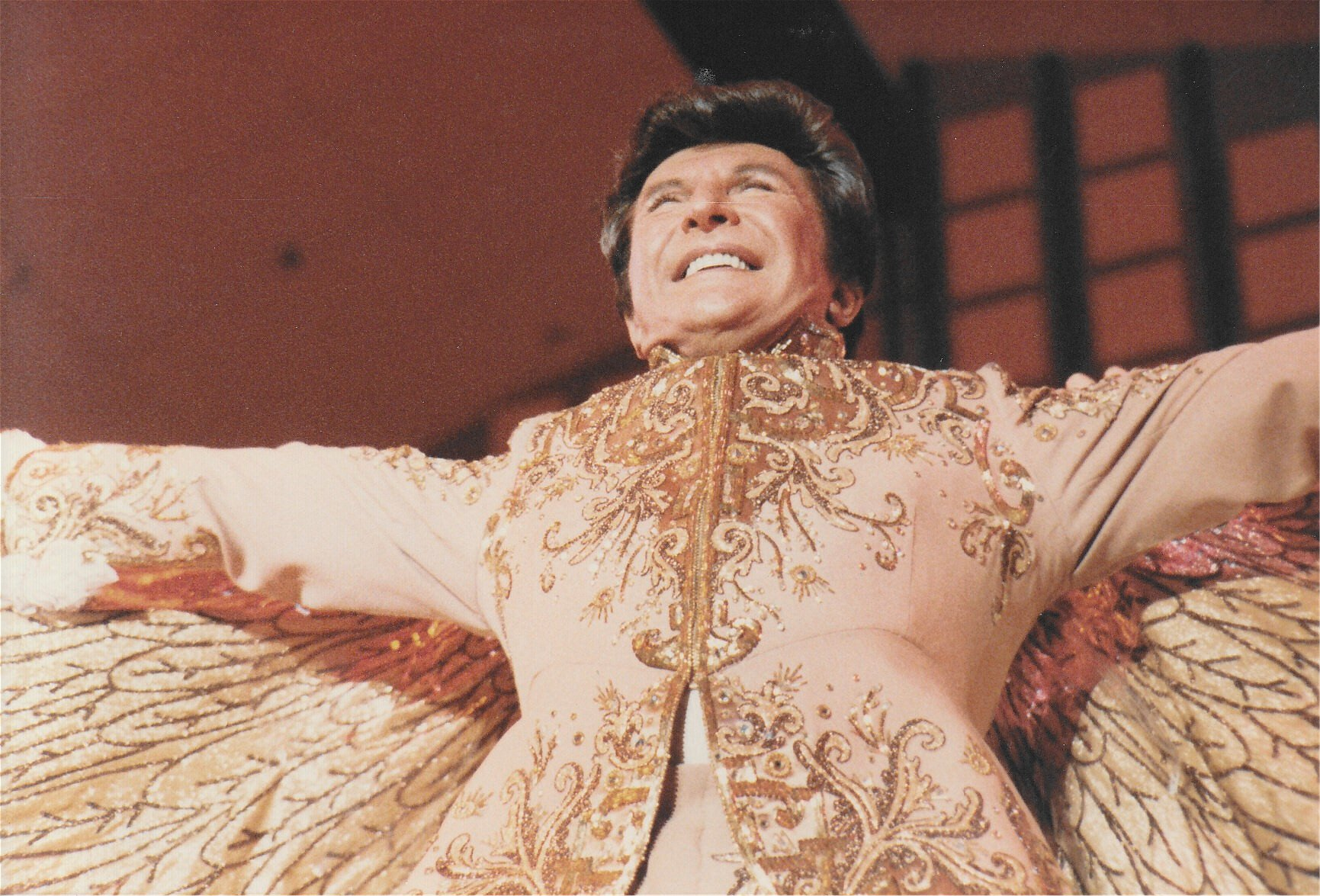
Liberace was described as an influence on the visual style of the music video for "Flamboyant"

A number of outlets compared the campy masculinity in the "Flamboyant" music video with Liberace; the Chicago Reader called it "a Liberace fever dream" and The Guardian called it "a celebration of foppishness". It features a mix of period and modern fashion with "surgical neons and futuristic pastels". Electra aimed to deconstruct notions such as heteronormativity and the gender binary with the Liberace-esque effeminate masculinity. The music video for "Adam & Steve", a gay presentation of the Genesis story, shows a subversion of the exorcism trope: when the gay character is exorcised, an angel is revealed instead of a demon. The video ends with Adam and Steve kissing in Heaven. The theologian Yannick Schlote cites these subversions as examples of the video portraying God's acceptance of gay love.

The music video for "Career Boy" combines the sex appeal of a traditional pop music video with "weird and scary" BDSM imagery to symbolize the way in which workaholic employees participate in their own subjugation. The "Daddy Like" music video features colorful visuals alongside campy outfits and caricatures of male success. The "Man to Man" music video mixes male aggression with homoeroticism in its part fight, part dance portrayal of a boxing scene. Gay Times called it "effortlessly cool" and felt the outfits channelled a "high-fashion kind of camp". The music video for "Guyliner" was inspired by the fashion and makeup of scene kids in the 2000s.

== Promotion and release ==
In June 2018, Electra came out as non-binary and released "Career Boy", which was followed in December with "Man to Man". The final singles, "Flamboyant" and "Daddy Like", were released that April and June, respectively. Electra announced that Flamboyant would be their debut album in May, and it was self-released on July 17, 2019. A release party was held at the Pico Union Project in Los Angeles. Electra supported the release of the album with a Flamboyant tour, which received a second leg in 2020. A deluxe version of the album was released on January 17, 2020.

== Reception ==
Flamboyant received positive reviews from critics. It was described as "staggeringly good" and "utterly OTT [over the top]" by Ben Beaumont-Thomas in The Guardian and "unapologetically outrageous" and "whimsically self-aware" by Erica Russell in Billboard. Reviews praised Electra's wordplay, "vocal acrobatics", refined production, and mix of genres on the album.

A number of reviewers felt the album's tracks were catchy pop songs that also have a deeper message. Jael Goldfine of Paper Magazine said the songs "double as club bangers and mini-treatises on gender politics" and said that they were satirical, scholarly and also deeply personal to Electra. Megan Wallace in Hunger also described the album's songs as "mini-treatises" that deconstruct ideas of gender and identity. She described the album as "non-conforming to its core", which helps it to create a safe space for queer people to be themselves. Daniel Megarry for the Gay Times said it operated as pop music that also has substance, using parody to provide a voice to the underrepresented. He called the album "purposeful pop ... at its finest".

The other artists featured on the album and its pro-queer messages also received praise. Goldfine called it a "queer family record" and Russell said it featured "production and songwriting credits from some of pop's most exciting innovators", with both reviewers mentioning the inclusion of artists like Jesse Saint John, Umru, and Absrdst. Russel further praised the album for being "packed with pro-queer messages and musings on gender and acceptance". Wallace felt that the presentation of a type of masculinity that is not "toxic" made the album an important contribution to discussions of gender.

=== Accolades ===
Publication	Accolade	Rank	Ref.
Dazed	The 20 Best Albums of 2019	14	
The Needle Drop	Top 50 Albums of 2019	10	
Noisey	The 100 Best Albums of 2019	70	
Paper	PAPER's Top 20 Albums of 2019	5	

== Track listing ==
Standard edition
No.	Title	Writer(s)	Producer(s)	Length
1.	"Mr. to You"	Dorian Electra; Robokid; Jesse Saint John	Robokid	2:06
2.	"Career Boy"	Electra; Will Vaughan	Will Vaughan	3:37
3.	"Daddy Like"	ABSRDST; Bonnie McKee; Electra; Dylan Brady; Mood Killer	Dylan Brady; ABSRDST	2:55
4.	"Emasculate"	Electra; Robokid	Robokid	2:18
5.	"Man to Man"	Electra; Socialchair; Weston Allen	Socialchair	3:17
6.	"Musical Genius"	Electra; Brady	Brady	1:55
7.	"Flamboyant"	Electra; ABSRDST	ABSRDST	3:16
8.	"Guyliner"	Electra; Socialchair	Socialchair	2:55
9.	"Live by the Sword"	Electra; Brady	Brady	2:31
10.	"Adam & Steve"	ABSRDST; Electra; Brady; Umru	ABSRDST^{[a]}; Brady; Umru	3:01
11.	"Freaky 4 Life"	ABSRDST; Electra	ABSRDST	3:17
Total length:				31:08

Deluxe edition
No.	Title	Writer(s)	Producer(s)	Length
12.	"Tool for You"	ABSRDST; Electra; Umru	ABSRDST; Umru	2:52
13.	"Under the Armor"	Electra; Robokid	Robokid	2:22
14.	"Guyliner, Pt. 2"	McKee; Electra; Brady; Mood Killer	Brady	2:45
15.	"Your Kinda Guy"	Electra; Diveo	Diveo	3:10
16.	"Adam & Steve" (Count Baldor Remix)	ABSRDST; Electra; Brady; Umru	Count Baldor^{[b]}; Brady; Umru	3:13
Total length:				45:30

Notes

- ^{^a} signifies vocal producer
- ^{^b} signifies remix producer
- 'Freaky 4 Life' is stylized as 'fReAkY 4 Life.'

== Personnel ==
Credits are adapted from Tidal.

- Dorian Electra — vocals (all tracks), songwriting (all tracks)
- Weston Allen — songwriting (track 5)
- Count Baldor — remix producer (track 16)
- Dylan Brady — songwriting (tracks 3, 6, 9, 10, 14, 16), production (tracks 3, 6, 9, 10, 14, 16), mixing (tracks 6, 9, 14)
- Ethan Budnick (Robokid) — songwriting (1, 4, 13), production (1, 4, 13), mixing (tracks 4, 13)
- Paul Cardon — mixing (track 7)
- Eric Cross (Socialchair) — songwriting (tracks 5, 8), production (tracks 5, 8), mixing (tracks 2, 5, 8, 10)
- Bonnie McKee — songwriting (tracks 3, 14)
- Rob Murray — mastering (all tracks)
- Jaan "Umru" Rothenberg — songwriting (tracks 10, 12, 16), production (tracks 10, 12, 16)
- Max Rosenzweig (Diveo) — songwriting (track 15), production (track 15), mixing (track 15)
- Jacky Shepard (ABSRDST) — songwriting (tracks 3, 7, 10, 11, 12, 16), production (tracks 3, 7, 11, 12), vocal production (track 10), mixing (tracks 11, 12)
- Parker Silzer IV — guitars (tracks 10, 16)
- David Stagno — guitars (tracks 10, 16)
- Jesse St. John Geller — songwriting (track 1)
- Will Vaughn — songwriting (track 2), production (track 2)
- Michael Zarowny (Mood Killer) — songwriting (tracks 3, 14)
- Charlotte Rutherford — album cover

== Release history ==
Release dates and formats for Flamboyant
Region	Date	Format	Version	Label
Various	July 17, 2019	LP; CD; digital download; streaming	Original	Self-released
Various	January 17, 2020	LP; digital download; streaming	Deluxe	Self-released
