= Fanfare (Dorian Electra album) =

Studio album by Dorian Electra
- Released: October 6, 2023
- Genre: Electropop, hyperpop
- Length: 41:21
- Label: Self-released

Dorian Electra chronology
My Agenda (2020)	Fanfare (2023)	Dorian Electra (2026)

Singles from Fanfare
- 1. "Freak Mode" Released: April 7, 2023; 2. "Sodom & Gomorrah" Released: June 1, 2023; 3. "Anon" Released: July 19, 2023; 4. "Puppet" Released: August 31, 2023; 5. "Idolize" Released: October 3, 2023

Fanfare is the third studio album by American singer and songwriter Dorian Electra.

== Composition and themes ==
Fanfare has been described as hyperpop and electropop, although it blends a wide range of genres and some critics have said it defies genre categorization. It includes elements of rock, emo, jazz, classical music, electronic dance music, and musical theater. Thematically, it focuses on fame and fandom, including the faith-like devotion of fans and the ability of capitalism to create and capitalize fandoms. The album cover portrays Electra wearing bold colors and military garb, meant to evoke both a dictator and a popstar or rock star.

=== Songs ===
Critics noted more elaborate instrumentation on Fanfare compared to Electra's previous two albums, beginning in the very first song "Symphony", which contains lyrics expressing the loneliness of pop stardom and Electra begging for fans. "Idolize" is a "high-octane pop track" about an obsessively devoted fan, which Ringtone described as having "masochistic underpinnings".

"Freak Mode" features sexualized lyrics celebrating uniqueness and difference, with heavy guitar riffs and "frenetic rhythms". Billboard described the song as "shock-rock-meets-hyperpop". For "Sodom & Gomorrah", Electra described wanting to reclaim the concept of sodomy, which has been used to oppress queer people, in a "bratty, slutty, sexy song". Based on the biblical story of Sodom and Gomorrah, it celebrates anal sex with a 2000s pop style similar to Britney Spears.

The opening to the song "Puppet" quotes "Für Elise" by Beethoven, before shifting towards a more contemporary hyperpop sound. DIY called the song a "sexually frustrated fisting anthem", with critics identifying control, dependency and fan entitlement as themes. "Manmade Horrors" references an internet meme and apocryphal quote by Nikola Tesla about "manmade horrors beyond ... comprehension" to describe the shameless commoditization of novelty products under capitalism. "Yes Man" was influenced by rock opera and depicts a tragic Napoleonic figure who has pushed themselves to utter loneliness by surrounding themself with "yes men". The Line of Best Fit described it as a "five and a half minute epic" that "descends into a bouncing echo chamber of sinister laughter".

"Anon" explores the mob rule of internet anonymity, using a repetitive chorus and Lady Gaga-esque electropop beat. "Phonies" juxtaposes whispered lyrics with a silly "D-d-doot-doot-doot" trumpet vocal to satirize "self-righteous gatekeepers". "Touch Grass" uses the generation Z slang "touch grass" as a pretext to inhabit the persona of someone who is "terminally online". Critics highlighted the humorous pretentiousness of a bridge about disposing of used coffee grounds on "Lifetime", a song about mortality and living in the moment. "Warning Signs" is a ballad with building drums and trumpets similar to classic emo pop. The album ends with "Wanna Be a Star", in which Electra portrays stardom as unfulfilling and self-reflectively asks "Why do I wanna be a star?"

== Promotion and release ==
In March 2023, Electra updated their Instagram account with a link to "pledge to Freak Mode", leading to speculation that they would release their first new music since April 2022. The first single for Fanfare, "Freak Mode", was released soon after on April 7, 2023. This was followed by "Sodom & Gomorrah" in June, which was celebrated with a launch party at the Church of the Holy Apostles in Manhattan, New York. Electra announced that Fanfare would be their third studio album that July, and released the third single "Anon". The last two singles, "Puppet" and "Idolize", were released in August and October, and Fanfare was self-released by Electra on October 6. The album was supported by a world tour, which was extended with Fanfare: The Encore tour starting in September 2024.

== Track listing ==
Standard edition
No.	Title	Writer(s)	Producer(s)	Length
1.	"Symphony"	Clarence Clarity; Dorian Electra; Marcus Andersson	Clarence Clarity; Electra; Andersson	3:17
2.	"Idolize"	Casey Manierka Quaile, Cecile Believe, Electra, Jake Sillen, Thomas Parker, Weston Allen	Manierka Quaile; Cecile Believe; Count Baldor; Electra; Allen	2:25
3.	"Freak Mode"	Electra; Allen	Clarence Clarity; Electra	2:38
4.	"Sodom & Gomorrah"	Demi Yo'ko; Electra; Lauren Aquilina; Andersson; Marina Rei Thompson; Parker; Allen	Count Baldor; Electra; Andersson; Allen	3:10
5.	"Puppet"	Brasko; Electra; Raziel; Slush Puppy; Parker; Allen	Count Baldor; Electra; Raziel; Slush Puppy; Allen	2:24
6.	"Manmade Horrors"	Cecile Believe; Electra; Matt Squire; Slush Puppy; Parker; Allen	Cecile Believe; Electra; Squire; Slush Puppy; Allen	3:16
7.	"Yes Man"	Manierka Quaile; Electra	Manierka Quaile; Electra; Umru; Allen	5:25
8.	"Anon"	AJ Simons; Clarence Clarity; Electra; Jamie Reynolds; Jessica Winter; Allen	Clarence Clarity; Electra	2:47
9.	"Phonies"	Electra; Myylo; Raziel	Electra; Raziel; Allen	2:08
10.	"Touch Grass"	Manierka Quaile; Christy Carey; Electra; Kai Whiston; Parker; Umru; Allen	Manierka Quaile; Carey; Electra; Whiston; Allen	3:01
11.	"Lifetime"	Manierka Quaile; Cecile Believe; Electra; Myylo; Allen	Manierka Quaile; Cecile Believe; Electra; Allen	3:35
12.	"Warning Signs"	Manierka Quaile; Electra	Manierka Quaile; Electra; Allen	3:49
13.	"Wanna Be a Star"	Clarence Clarity; Electra	Clarence Clarity; Electra; Allen	3:26
Total length:				41:21

The Lost Demos (Side 1)
No.	Title	Writer(s)	Producer(s)	Length
1.	"Taboo (Demo)"	Alex Veltri; Electra; Myylo; Slush Puppy	Electra; Myylo; Slush Puppy	1:31
2.	"Only Got Your Number (Demo)"	Electra; Liam Hall	Electra; Altgrandma	2:32
3.	"In the Studio (Demo)"	Count Baldor; Electra; Sega Bodega; Allen	Count Baldor; Electra; Sega Bodega	1:46
4.	"10 in the Morning (Demo)"	Simons; Manierka Quaile; Count Baldor; DJ H; Electra; Whiston; Allen	Manierka Quaile; Count Baldor; Electra; Whiston	2:56
Total length:				8:45
