= Kiss My Super Bowl Ring =

Studio album by the Garden
- Released: March 13, 2020
- Studio: Senhorse
- Genres: Experimental punk; hardcore punk; experimental rock; drum and bass
- Length: 35:07
- Label: Epitaph
- Producers: The Garden; Dylan Brady, Jamie Bulled

The Garden chronology
Mirror Might Steal Your Charm (2018)	Kiss My Super Bowl Ring (2020)	Horseshit on Route 66 (2022)

Singles from Kiss My Super Bowl Ring
- 1. "Clench To Stay Awake" Released: January 15, 2020

Kiss My Super Bowl Ring is the fourth studio album by American experimental rock duo the Garden. The album was released on March 13, 2020, through Epitaph Records.

== Background ==
The album was announced on January 16, 2020, along with the release of the lead-off single, "Clench to Stay Awake". Promotional pictures and videos showed the band in an abandoned, dilapidated house, and the band interacting with a goblin-like creature named Jerimiah Cum Irwin.

As with the band's previous releases, the album is self produced; however, the tracks "Hit Eject" and "Lurkin'" were produced by 100 gecs member Dylan Brady, and the track "Sneaky Devil" was produced by Kero Kero Bonito member Jamie Bulled under his solo project WHARFWHIT.

== Composition ==
=== Music ===
Kiss My Super Bowl Ring features a significantly heavier sound and tone than its predecessor. The album's musical style, in contrast to the band's lighter and more melodic Mirror Might Steal Your Charm, Kiss My Super Bowl Ring exhibits more of a straightforward "punk" style, exploring some of the rawer sides of the band’s "vada vada" style. A major influence on the album was crust punk, in which Wyatt stated in a Reddit AMA was inspired by bands such as Dystopia, Rudimentary Peni, and Antischism. Many songs off the album also exhibit influences from genres as diverse as post-punk, aggressive drum and bass (a staple in The Garden's music), and even surf music in some of the guitar parts. The drums and vocals provided by Fletcher, and the guitar and bass work provided by Wyatt are significantly more abrasive. Many of the songs feature shrieked vocals, fast tremolo picking, and blast beats that are reminiscent of black metal, but many songs also feature a handful of rapping in the album’s more electronic sounds.

=== Lyrics ===
The lyrics on Kiss My Super Bowl Ring, as previous albums do, follow a running motif of self-confidence and perseverance, with "Clench to Stay Awake" featuring lyrics of overcoming physical obstacles. Despite some songs containing more positive messages, a majority of songs features pessimistic and bleak lyrics, with songs like "A Struggle," "Sneaky Devil", and "Please, Fuck Off" all having a theme of struggling with distaste for ones self and others. The title track, as well as the album title and the phrase itself, means "kiss my ass".

== Critical reception ==
Professional ratings
Aggregate scores
Source	Rating
Album of the Year	66/100
Metacritic	71/100
Review scores
Source	Rating
AllMusic	2.5/5 stars
Exclaim!	8/10
NME	4/5 stars
Pitchfork	6.4/10

Kiss My Super Bowl Ring received generally favorable reviews from contemporary music critics. On review aggregator website, Metacritic, the album has an average rating of 71 out of 100 indicating "generally favorable reviews based on 5 critics". On Album of the Year, the album has an average rating of 65 out of 100 based on eight critic reviews.

Writing for, Exclaim!, Spencer Nafekh-Blanchette, gave Kiss My Super Bowl Ring a positive review, praising the seamless fusions of genre-crossing and the chemistry between Wyatt and Fletcher Shears. Nafekh-Blanchette said the album is "their most viscerally intense release thus far". Further, Nafekh-Blanchette said that the album "has the Garden screaming as much as they are singing, and transitioning between the two within a matter of seconds. Somehow, the Shears brothers are able to make it work". Nafekh-Blanchette gave the album an 8 out of 10.

In a mixed review, Abby Jones, writing for Pitchfork said that Kiss My Super Bowl Ring is "proudly defiant; the title, Wyatt has clarified, essentially means “kiss my ass.” But where deviation from the norm has spawned countless artistic geniuses, Super Bowl Ring too often comes off as just a hodgepodge of ideas. “Vada vada,” it seems, has hurt the Garden as much as it's helped them." Jones ultimately gave the album a 6.4 out of 10.

Maria Lewczyk, writing for NME, gave the album four stars out of five. Lewczyk praised the music's unique sound compared to many of their rock music contemporaries. Of the sound, Lewczyk said, "you get the overarching sense that they are more than a little bored with the current musical landscape and want to inject it with their own restless brand of creativity. If this is art rock, then the Shears brothers have crafted a pretty damn impressive collage."

== Track listing ==
All lyrics are written by Wyatt and Fletcher Shears.

Kiss My Super Bowl Ring track listing
No.	Title	Length
1.	"Clench to Stay Awake"	3:18
2.	"A Struggle"	3:40
3.	"Sneaky Devil"	3:03
4.	"Kiss My Super Bowl Ring"	3:06
5.	"A Fool's Expedition"	3:09
6.	"AMPM Truck"	3:40
7.	"Hit Eject"	3:06
8.	"The King of Cutting Corners"	2:37
9.	"Lurkin'" (featuring Khalif Jones)	3:02
10.	"Lowrider Slug" (featuring Ariel Pink)	4:20
11.	"Please, Fuck Off"	2:17
Total length:		35:07

== Personnel ==
The following individuals were credited with the production of the album:

The Garden

- Fletcher Shears – drums, electronics, vocals
- Wyatt Shears – bass, electronics, guitars, vocals

Additional personnel

- Khalif Jones – additional vocals on “Lurkin’”
- Ariel Pink – additional vocals on “Lowrider Slug”
- Dylan Brady – producer on “Hit Eject” and “Lurkin’”
- Jamie Bulled - producer on “Sneaky Devil”
- Carrot Top – vocal samples
- Samur Khouja – engineer, mixing
- Jim Kissling – mastering
- Wharfwhit – producer, vocal samples
- Alex Petty – artwork
- Ashley Clue – assistant art director, photography
