= Gupi =

American musician (born 1999)

- Also known as: Spencer Hawk/Spenny
- Born: Spencer Anthony Hawk; March 26, 1999 (age 27); Encinitas, California, U.S.
- Genres: Hyperpop; experimental pop
- Occupations: Musician
- Years active: 2016–present
- Label: Dog Show Records
- Member of: Food House
- Website: gupi.info

Spencer Anthony Hawk (born March 26, 1999), also known by their (Note: Gupi uses they/them pronouns) stage name Gupi, is an American electronic musician. Gupi is the child of skateboarder Tony Hawk. They are part of the musical duo Food House (stylized in lowercase) alongside Fraxiom.

== Biography ==
As a child, Hawk's mother encouraged them to learn the guitar, which started their interest in music. In school, they played in a rock band with several of their friends. When they discovered artists like Skrillex and Deadmau5, Hawk decided to pursue electronic music instead. They worked on electronic music throughout middle school and high school, and connected with other producers through SoundCloud. Hawk originally made music under the name W3N, but began releasing music as Gupi in 2016, when they were 17. It originally stood as an acronym for Guilty Until Proven Innocent.

In 2018, Hawk released their second EP, All, through the record label RORA Team. Charli XCX heard their EP and asked them to do a session with her for her 2019 album, Charli. The work that they did was not released on her album, but Hawk had the opportunity to meet and work alongside A. G. Cook and Dylan Brady. In February 2020, Hawk released their debut album, None, through Dog Show Records, a record label owned by Brady. In October 2020, Hawk and Fraxiom released Food House under the Food House name, through the same label. This was followed up by the duo's sophomore album, Two House, in February 2025.

Though their father is supportive of their work, Hawk says that they "[try] to make a very large point of not at all involving [their] dad" so that their accomplishments are considered to be their own.

Hawk has a degree in electronic production at Berklee, from which they graduated in 2021. They are currently based in New York City.

== Artistry ==
Ben Mangelsdorf of Underground Underdogs describes Gupi's music as experimental pop and compares it to the music of Sophie and Skrillex. Kyle Whiting of 34th Street Magazine calls Gupi's album None an "exhilarating thrillride of maximalist club tracks" that draw elements from genres like bubblegum bass, house, and dubstep. Matt Moen of Paper notes that the lead single from None, "Thos Moser", includes lyrics with multiple "irreverent non-sequiturs and pop culture shout outs".

Hawk has cited their musical influences as PC Music, System of a Down, Britney Spears, and a picture of Sonic the Hedgehog. They make all of their cover artwork in the default Mac application Preview.

== Discography ==
=== Albums ===
- None (Dog Show Records, 2020)
- you're it (Self-released, 2022)
- paper eater (2022)
- ever since (2026)

=== Collaboration albums ===
- food house (with Fraxiom as Food House) (Dog Show Records, 2020)
- two house (with Fraxiom as Food House) (2025)

=== EPs ===
- Company (RORA Team, 2017)
- All (RORA Team, 2018)
- Bunny Hill Original Soundtrack (Self-released, 2021)
- check-in (2023)
- glow-zone (2023)
- puppeteer my corpse at the renegade please (2024)

=== Singles ===
Year	Title	Album
2020	"Thos Moser" (with Fraxiom)	None
2020	"Ride" (with Fraxiom as Food House)	Food House
2020	"Mos Thoser" (with Fraxiom as Food House)	Food House
2021	"What's Known Now"	you're it
2021	"Body Horror"	you're it
2021	"Butterfly Knife" (with Fraxiom as Food House)	Non-album single
2021	"Ongoing"	you're it
2022	"1P-747 Chopped"	paper eater
2022	"Master Builder 1999"	paper eater
2022	"Foreverial"	paper eater
2024	"special" (with Fraxiom as Food House)	two house
2024	"kutna hora" (with Fraxiom as Food House)	two house
2025	"credit card knife" (with Fraxiom as Food House)	two house
2026	"fanfare"	ever since
2026	"time waster"	ever since
2026	"vulcan"	ever since
2026	"happyland"	Non-album single
