= Reflections (Hannah Diamond album) =

Studio album by Hannah Diamond
- Released: 22 November 2019
- Recorded: 2016–2018
- Genres: Pop; hyperpop; trance-pop; bubblegum pop
- Length: 39:04
- Label: PC Music
- Producers: A. G. Cook; Easyfun

Hannah Diamond chronology
Soon I Won't See You at All (2017)	Reflections (2019)	Perfect Picture (2023)

Singles from Reflections
- 1. "Fade Away" Released: 7 October 2016; 2. "Make Believe" Released: 23 December 2016; 3. "True" Released: 16 November 2018; 4. "Invisible" Released: 30 October 2019; 5. "Love Goes On" Released: 13 November 2019

Reflections is the debut studio album by the English singer and visual artist Hannah Diamond. It was released on 22 November 2019 via PC Music.

== Background and release ==
Reflections initially was intended to be released as an EP in late 2016 with its lead single being "Fade Away", which was released on 7 October 2016. Following the announcement of the EP, Diamond released "Make Believe" on 23 December 2016. She continued to hint at new music throughout 2017 and 2018, telling fans via social media that new music would be imminent.

A mix titled Soon I Won't See You at All was released on 13 December 2017, produced entirely by A.G. Cook and featured three songs which would also be featured on Reflections. The three tracks were "Never Again", "Concrete Angel" (a cover of a song by Gareth Emery) and "The Ending".

"True" was released as the official lead single from the album on 16 November 2018. It was released alongside a lyric video featuring a typeface Diamond made herself. The track received attention for its more emotional sound; regarded by Matt Moen of Paper Magazine as "weaving sentimentality and emotion through a landscape of digital disconnect and jaded apathy". In press releases, it was stated that Reflections would be released in early 2019, however this did not come to fruition.

"Invisible" was released as the album's second single on 30 October 2019, alongside a music video directed by Daniel Swan & Hannah Diamond. On the same day, it was announced that Reflections would be released on 22 November 2019, and the cover art for the album was also revealed. On the following day, her first headlining tour "The Invisible Tour" was announced in support of the album. It began on 4 December 2019.

"Love Goes On" was released as the album's third single on 13 November 2019, alongside a music video directed by Vasilisa Forbes.

The tracklist of Reflections was revealed via Diamond's social media on 21 November 2019.

Vinyl versions of the album were announced in November 2019 for later release, and was later announced in January 2020 that they were up for pre-order and would be released in sometime in 2020. On 22 April 2020, Diamond released an EP of remixes of songs from the album.

== Composition ==
Reflections is a pop, trance, and bubblegum pop record, with elements of breakcore, happy hardcore, Eurodance, synthwave, electro house, and techno. The album explores themes of heartbreak and human emotions, in contrast to the robotic aesthetic crafted by Diamond early on in her career. It was described by one critic as a "breakup album". The album's sound has been compared to the works of Charli XCX, Sarah Bonito, Caroline Polachek, Imogen Heap, and Porter Robinson.

== The Invisible Tour (2019–2020) ==
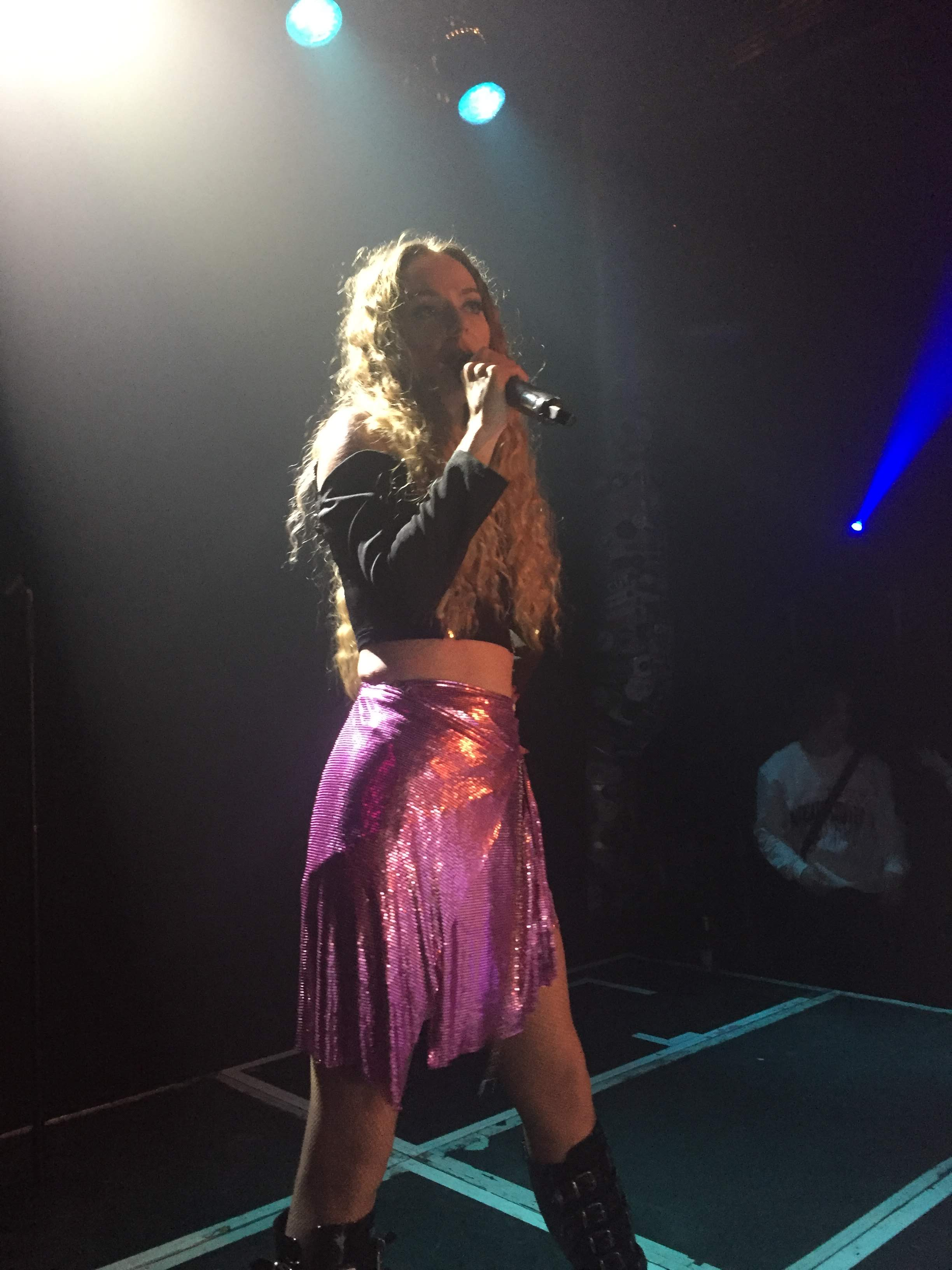
Hannah Diamond performing at The Invisible Tour in Amsterdam on 26 February 2020

The Invisible Tour is the first headlining tour by Hannah Diamond in support of her debut album Reflections. On 31 October 2019, She announced second show in London, followed by the one in Paris and Berlin the following day. Due to high demand, she added the first London show on 4 November. On 13 November, she announced that the opening act for the London shows will be Namasenda, and on 9 December that the opening acts for Paris and Berlin were Planet 1999 and Mechatok. On 28 November, she announced the second leg of her tour. All shows for the first leg were sold out. During January 2020, she announced that she would appear at Journey Fest in Copenhagen, Melt Festival in Ferropolis and Primavera Sound Barcelona. On 6 February 2020, the opening acts for the second leg were announced and her Glasgow show sold out on the same day. On 26 February, she revealed that the second leg had sold out. On 30 March 2020, Diamond put an announcement on her website that because of the COVID-19 pandemic, she has had to cancel some upcoming performances and festival appearances.

The tour began in London on 4 December 2019, and finished in London on 13 March 2020. The tour visited five countries in Europe and contained 11 shows.

== Critical reception ==
Professional ratings
Aggregate scores
Source	Rating
Metacritic	79/100
Review scores
Source	Rating
Clash	8/10
Exclaim!	7/10
The Guardian	4/5 stars
The Line of Best Fit	9/10
NME	4/5 stars
The Observer	4/5 stars
Pitchfork	6.2/10

Reflections received generally positive reviews from music critics. At Metacritic, which assigns a normalised rating out of 100 to reviews from mainstream publications, the album received an average score of 79, indicating 'generally favorable reviews'. Katherine St. Asaph of Pitchfork criticized Diamond's vocals and songwriting as "affectless" and the album's sound as being behind the times in comparison to the more forward-thinking music of her peers at PC Music. However, St. Asaph did praise the cover of "Concrete Angel" as "exhilarating" and saying "more happens in these four minutes than the rest of the album combined". In contrast, Hannah Mylrea of NME called Diamond's lyrics "brilliantly straightforward" and commended A. G. Cook's production, though criticized the album's slower songs like the title track. Valarie Magan of Clash called "Love Goes On" "an outstanding track, the depth of its rich, almost robotic sonic landscape standing in sharp contrast to what are, at their core, very human, vulnerable lyrics."

== Track listing ==
All tracks are written by Hannah Amond and Alexander Guy Cook, except where noted. All tracks are produced by A. G. Cook, except where noted. Credits adapted from Tidal.

Reflections track listing
No.	Title	Writer(s)	Producer(s)	Length
1.	"Reflections"			3:54
2.	"Invisible"	Hannah Amond; Alexander Guy Cook; Finn Keane; Thomas Carrell; Christopher Mason	Cook; Easyfun	3:19
3.	"Love Goes On"			4:36
4.	"Never Again"			3:46
5.	"True"			3:32
6.	"Concrete Angel"	Gareth Emery; Christina Novelli		4:59
7.	"The Ending"			3:51
8.	"Shy"			2:54
9.	"Fade Away"	Amond; Cook; Keane	Cook; Easyfun	4:16
10.	"Make Believe"	Amond; Cook; Keane	Cook; Easyfun	3:57
Total length:				39:04

Reflections Remixes EP and CD Special edition bonus tracks
No.	Title	Length
1.	"Invisible" (Dylan Brady Remix)	2:58
2.	"Love Goes On" (Palmistry Remix) (featuring Bladee)	3:39
3.	"True" (Umru Remix)	3:05
4.	"Fade Away" (Mechatok Remix)	3:22
5.	"Make Believe" (Yung Sherman Remix)	3:21
Total length:		16:25

Reflections Hard Drive [Exclusive Access]
No.	Title	Length
1.	"Heaven" (Piano version)	4:06
2.	"Acoustic Angel"	5:27
3.	"Superstar Cover"	4:48
Total length:		14:21

== Release history ==
Release history of Reflections
Region	Date	Format	Version	Label	Ref.
Various	22 November 2019	Digital download; streaming	Standard	PC Music	
Various	19 December 2019	LP	Standard	PC Music	
Various	22 April 2020	digital download; streaming	Remix EP	PC Music	
Various	15 November 2020	CD	Special	PC Music	
Various	24 November 2020	Digital download	Hard Drive EP	PC Music	
