= Josh Pan =

josh pan

Background information
- Born: Joshua Pan; 1989 (age 36–37); Pennsylvania, U.S.
- Origin: Hsinchu, Taiwan / New York City, New York, U.S.
- Genres: Electronic; Hip hop; Alternative R&B
- Occupations: Singer-songwriter; Music producer; Artist; Designer; DJ
- Instruments: Piano; Guitar; Bass; Saxophone; Drums; Vocals
- Years active: 2012–present
- Labels: OWSLA; 88rising
- Website: joshpan.com

Joshua Pan (born 1989), known professionally as josh pan, is an American singer-songwriter, music producer, artist, and designer known for his work in electronic, hip-hop, and alternative R&B music. He gained attention in the underground bass scene through collaborations with artists like Skrillex, Dylan Brady, and Joji. Affiliated with labels OWSLA and 88rising, josh pan is recognized for his experimental production style.

== Career ==
=== 2015: Early work ===
josh pan was signed to OWSLA by Skrillex in 2015. In the same year, he released the IT G MA Remix (josh pan Opus)feat. A$AP Ferg, Father (rapper), Dumbfoundead, Waka Flocka Flame with Anderson .Paak with OWSLA. He joined 88rising as an inaugural artist alongside Brian Puspos, Dumbfoundead, and Okasian in 2015. He gained attention through a publicity stunt claiming "josh pan" was a collective of 20 artists, including producers like Y2K, Jai Wolf and Manila Killa, later debunked as a marketing hoax, confirming his solo artistry.

=== 2016–2018: Growing recognition ===
In 2016, Pan released “Platinum” with X&G, and collaborated with ABRA on “Give It to Ya” and Dumbfoundead on “Banned from the Motherland” with Jay Park, Simon Dominic, and G2. In 2018, he released “Wait for Me” and “Paradise” with X&G, and “Voom,” a minimalist, groovy track noted for its catchy melody. His 2018 EP The World Within included “Undefeated,” and he performed at 88rising’s Head in the Clouds Festival. Other festival appearances include Coachella, ULTRA, HARD Summer, Shambhala & more.

=== 2019–present: Collaborations and festival performances ===
In 2019, Pan collaborated with Dylan Brady on the album This Car Needs Some Wheels, releasing tracks like “Save The World,” “Ready To Go,” and “Brain” with Dylan Brady and Lewis Grant. He worked with Medasin and X&G on “No Face” and featured on “4 MIND” with Dog Blood, Skrillex, Boys Noize, and X&G. In 2020, he collaborated with Flawed Mangoes on “Show You,” a single blending Pan’s signature vocals with guitar-driven melodies and intricate electronic production for Next Wave Records’ mixtape series. In 2021, he released “Supersonic (My Existence)” with Skrillex, Noisia, and Dylan Brady, which appeared on Skrillex’s 2023 album Quest for Fire, nominated for Best Dance/Electronic Album at the 66th Annual Grammy Awards in 2024. In 2022, he featured on “Somehow We Lost It All” with IMANU and Pham. In 2024, he released “Andale” and remixed “ANIMA”.

== Selected works ==
=== Studio albums ===
- This Car Needs Some Wheels (with Dylan Brady) (2019)

=== Extended plays ===
- The World Within (2018)
- Pandora’s Box (2014)

=== Sample packs ===
- The Last Pack You’ll Ever Need (with X&G) (2020)
- Man’s Best Friend Vol. 1 (2016)
- Childhood Vol. 3 (with Gill Chang) (2017)
- Childhood Vol. 2 (2016)
- Childhood Vol. 1 (2015)

=== Discography ===
==== Current official releases ====
| Year | Title |
|---|---|
| 2024 | Menace (feat. EARTHGANG) (Josh Pan Remix) |
| 2024 | Andale |
| 2021 | Supersonic (My Existence) (Skrillex, Noisia, Dylan Brady) |
| 2021 | Go With the Fire |
| 2021 | Float |
| 2020 | Show You (josh pan & Flawed Mangoes) |
| 2019 | Save The World (feat. Lewis Grant) (josh pan & Dylan Brady) |
| 2019 | Ready To Go (josh pan & Dylan Brady) |
| 2019 | Brain (feat. Lewis Grant) (josh pan & Dylan Brady) |
| 2019 | Devil By My Side (josh pan & Dylan Brady) |
| 2019 | Revolution (josh pan & Dylan Brady) |
| 2019 | Past Lives (josh pan & Dylan Brady) |
| 2019 | Many Moons (josh pan & Dylan Brady) |
| 2019 | The Whistle (josh pan & Dylan Brady) |
| 2019 | My Own Behavior (josh pan & Dylan Brady) |
| 2019 | Wheels (josh pan & Dylan Brady) |
| 2019 | Joyride (josh pan & Dylan Brady) |
| 2019 | 4 MIND (Dog Blood, Skrillex, Boys Noize, X&G feat. josh pan) |
| 2019 | No Face (w Medasin, X&G) |
| 2019 | Mask (with AWAY) |
| 2018 | Wait for Me (josh pan & X&G) |
| 2018 | Paradise (josh pan & X&G) |
| 2018 | Wicked (1788-L feat. josh pan) |
| 2018 | Windows '17 |
| 2018 | Overdue |
| 2018 | Take Your Time |
| 2018 | Undefeated |
| 2018 | Voom |
| 2017 | Feelin Me |
| 2017 | Ekali ft. Denzel Curry – Babylon (josh pan & X&G Remix) |
| 2017 | Give It to Ya (ft. ABRA) |
| 2017 | Jugg (ft. bbno$) |
| 2017 | Selfish |
| 2017 | I Can’t Feel My Face w/ X&G |
| 2017 | Esc (BASECAMP, X&G & josh pan remix) |
| 2017 | Unconditional Love |
| 2016 | Platinum w/ X&G |
| 2016 | Tomahawk |
| 2016 | Imperfect (feat. Misogi) |
| 2016 | One Night (jp remix) |
| 2016 | Banned From the Motherland (feat. Dumbfoundead, Jay Park, Simon D, G2) |
| 2015 | IT G MA Remix (josh pan Opus) [feat. A$AP Ferg, Father, Dumbfoundead, Waka Flocka Flame with Anderson .Paak] |
| 2015 | Nowhere w/ X&G |
| 2015 | IDTM w/ X&G |
| 2015 | Kys |
| 2015 | 20 Gauge |
| 2014 | Do You Believe in Soulmates |
| 2014 | Annabelle |
| 2014 | Real Life |
| 2014 | I Miss You |
| 2014 | Thoughts on Death |
| 2014 | What Doesn’t Kill You Fucks You up Mentally |
| 2014 | Blue Skin |
| 2014 | Blue Velvet |
| 2014 | Lucid Dreams |

==== As featured artist ====
| Year | Title |
|---|---|
| 2022 | Somehow We Lost It All (IMANU, Pham, josh pan) |
| 2022 | La Fournaise (IMANU, The Caracal Project, josh pan) |
| 2021 | Pain (SLUMBERJACK, TWERL, josh pan) |
| 2020 | Winter (Sterfry, josh pan) |
| 2019 | RED STONE RUST (Eric North, BLVC SVND, josh pan) |
| 2019 | The Zoo (X&G Remix) (Medasin, X&G, josh pan) |
| 2019 | The Zoo (Medasin, X&G, josh pan) |
| 2019 | Hourglass (Hex Cougar, AWAY, josh pan) |
| 2018 | Wicked (1788-L, josh pan) |
| 2018 | It’s Not This (Bearson, Lemaitre, josh pan) |
| 2018 | Movie (SQWAD Remix) (Habstrakt, josh pan, SQWAD) |
| 2018 | Movie (Habstrakt, josh pan) |
| 2018 | Burn (Madeaux, josh pan, Fifi Rong, HOLLY) |
| 2017 | Vision (SLUMBERJACK, QUIX, josh pan) |
| 2017 | Choke Me (Juelz, josh pan) |
| 2016 | Whiplash (X&G, josh pan) |
| 2016 | Church (MISOGI, josh pan) |
| 2016 | Ain’t Nobody Like You (Yung Bae, josh pan) |

==== Alternative platform releases ====
| Year | Title |
|---|---|
| 2017 | selfish (w Y2K, Dylan Brady, Judge & POLYPHIA) |
| 2014 | the levitation stone |
| 2014 | imagine peaking on this (ft. Manitee) |
| 2014 | we’ll never know what we want |
| 2014 | angelina (ft. Pham) |
| 2014 | now you see me |
| 2014 | nectar |
| 2014 | daydream |
| 2014 | hermes |
