= Sorry Bro (I Love You) =

Single by Dorian Electra

from the album My Agenda
- Released: May 19, 2020
- Genre: Hyperpop
- Length: 1:27
- Label: Self-released
- Songwriters: Dorian Electra; Mood Killer
- Producers: Dylan Brady; Count Baldor

Dorian Electra singles chronology
"Gec 2 Ü (Remix)" (2020)	"Sorry Bro (I Love You)" (2020)	"Give Great Thanks" (2020)

"Sorry Bro (I Love You)" is a song by American singer and songwriter Dorian Electra, released as the lead single from their second studio album My Agenda on May 19, 2020. An album of remixes by various artists was released on June 23, 2020.

== Composition ==
Produced by Count Baldor and Dylan Brady and written by Electra and Mood Killer, "Sorry Bro (I Love You)" features "medieval harpsichords, ravey synths and a blown-out dubstep trap beat" with elements of baroque pop over a campy hyperpop sound. Like many Dorian Electra songs, the "tongue-in-cheek" track evokes common tropes of toxic masculinity, but subverts them by adding homoerotic undertones. These themes are played up in the Weston Allen-directed video, which features Electra skateboarding, lifting weights, and "crack[ing] open a cold one with their ‘bros’".

== Track listing ==
Digital download

1. "Sorry Bro (I Love You)" – 1:27

Digital download − Remix EP

1. "Sorry Bro (I Love You)" (Himera Remix) – 2:21
2. "Sorry Bro (I Love You)" (PUTOCHINOMARICÓN Remix) – 1:14
3. "Sorry Bro (I Love You)" (Lil Mariko & Full Tac Remix) – 1:44
4. "Sorry Bro (I Love You)" (Bronze Avery Remix) – 1:15
5. "Sorry Bro (I Love You)" (Brostep Remix) – 2:19
6. "Sorry Bro (I Love You)" (Shubu Remix) – 1:15
7. "Sorry Bro (I Love You)" (recovery girl Remix) – 2:04
8. "Sorry Bro (I Love You)" (Astra King Remix) – 1:51
