= Cortisa Star =

- Star in 2025

Background information
- Born: July 11, 2005 (age 21)
- Origin: Delaware, U.S.
- Genre: Hip hop
- Occupation: Rapper
- Instrument: Vocals
- Years active: 2023–present
- Label: Open Shift Distribution

Cortisa Star (born July 11, 2005) is an American rapper and model. She is best known for her song "Fun", which went viral on Twitter and TikTok in 2024.

== Life and career ==
Star was born on July 11, 2005. She is a transgender woman. In 2022, she posted a video jokingly referring to herself as an "underground rap princess" despite never having rapped and soon began releasing rap music due to the support she received. Her singles "Cortisa Crump" and "Fun" were both released in February 2024, the latter of which began trending on TikTok that month. She released her single "Bad ASF" in December 2024. Also that month, her music became popular among Twitter users in December 2024 and received attention from singer Charli XCX and record producer Loraine James after a performance of "Fun" on the YouTube channel 4 Shooters Only went viral on the platform. By then, she had released 11 songs.

On March 11, 2025, Star made her runway debut for Miu Miu on the last day of Paris Fashion Week. Her track "Paris" details this experience.

== Musical style ==
Star's music is known for its heavy bass, which she has stated was initially inspired by a scene from the animated series Adventure Time in which Jake the Dog dances with a bug, and hyperpop and drill influences. Her stage name was inspired by her deadname and her love of space. For PinkNews, Charlie Duncan wrote that she was "known for her explicit lyrics and devil-may-care attitude", and The Fader described her songs as "bubbly blown-out drill" and her lyrics as "truly outrageous". For the same publication, Steffanee Wang described her songs as "bombastic and risqué".

== Discography ==
=== EPs ===
List of extended plays, with selected details
Title	Details
E.M.O. (Evil Motion Overload)	Released: April 11, 2025; Label: Open Shift Distribution; Format: Digital download, streaming

=== As lead artist ===
List of singles as lead artist
Title	Year	Album
"Begin"	2023	Non-album singles
"Holy Grail"	2023	Non-album singles
"Still a Menace"	2023	Non-album singles
"Get It Down"	2023	E.M.O. (Evil Motion Overload)
"Fun"	2024	E.M.O. (Evil Motion Overload)
"Nuts"	2024	Non-album single
"Cortisa Crump"	2024	E.M.O. (Evil Motion Overload)
"Fritz" (with Native Foreign)	2024	Non-album singles
"Block" (with Native Foreign)	2024	Non-album singles
"Bad ASF" (prod. MsChickenSandwich)	2024	E.M.O. (Evil Motion Overload)
"What You Want" (with Annamae)	2024	Non-album single
"Misidentify"	2025	E.M.O. (Evil Motion Overload)
"Paris"	2025	E.M.O. (Evil Motion Overload)
"Machinery"	2025	Non-album singles
"Piano Tiles 2" (with Armani West and 6arelyhuman)	2025	Non-album singles
"Fiend"	2025	Non-album singles
"Party All Week Bitch"	2025	Non-album singles

=== As featured artist ===
List of singles as featured artist
Title	Year	Album
"Stripper Money" (Remix) (Cherry X featuring Cortisa Star and Acid Souljah)	2024	Chry4girlz
"Bandz Bandz" (Amour Neveah featuring Cortisa Star)	2024	Non-album singles
"Big Ole" (Amour Neveah featuring Cortisa Star)	2024	Non-album singles
"Dash" (Faitvenus featuring Cortisa Star)	2024	Non-album singles
"Forever" (oothree featuring Cortisa Star)	2025	Non-album singles
"Ins4ne" (Vogue Remix) (Priceyxox featuring Jadadoll and Cortisa Star)	2025	Non-album singles
"Dumb" (Only Fire featuring Cortisa Star)	2025	Non-album singles
"Get Some" (Kim Petras featuring Cortisa Star)	2026	Pretour

=== Guest appearances ===
List of guest appearances, with year, other artist(s), and album
Title	Year	Artist(s)	Album
"Choke"	2024	Skaiwater, Carter the Bandit	#Gigi
