= Food House =

American musical duo

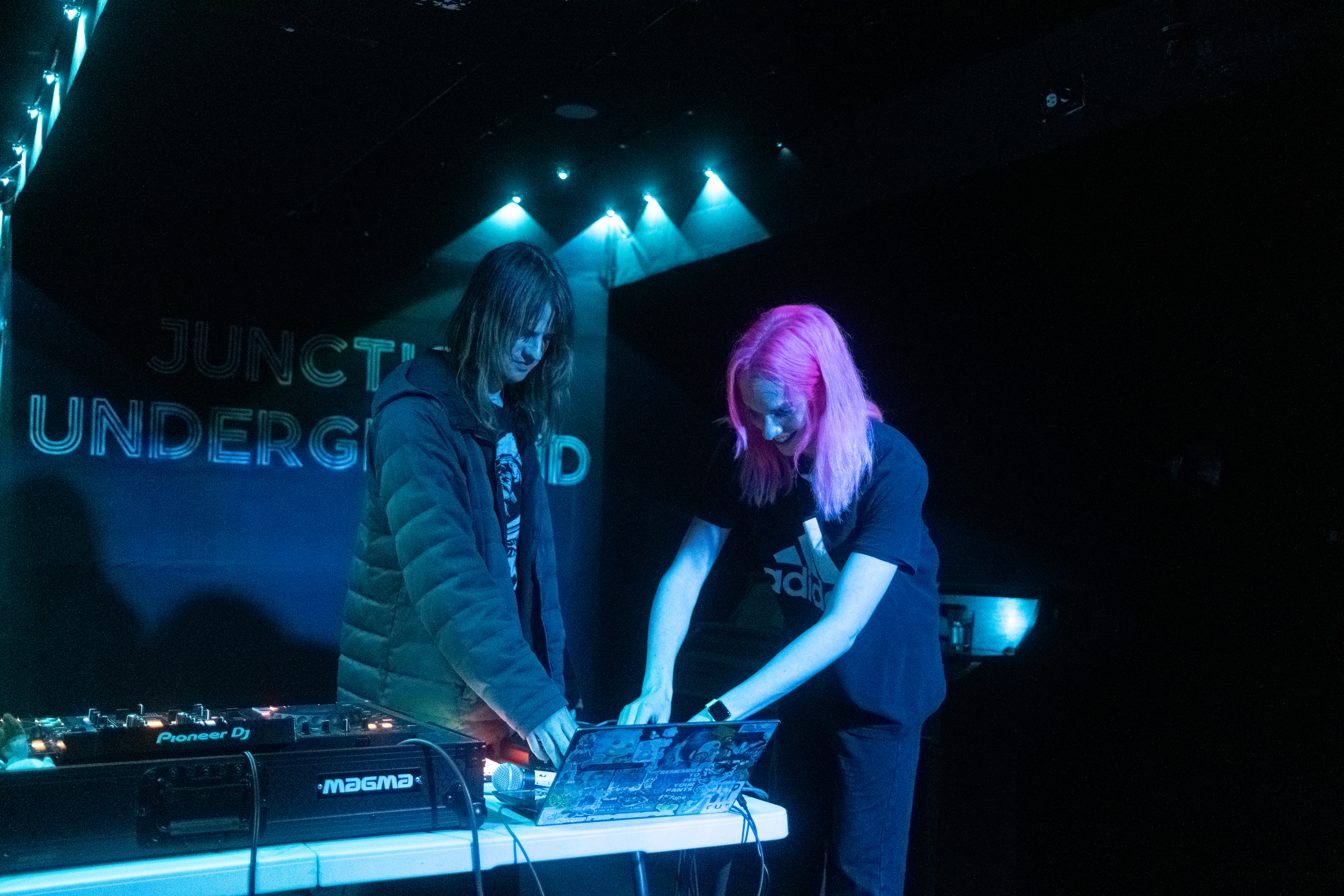
- Food House performing in May 2025

Background information
- Origin: Boston, Massachusetts, U.S.
- Genre: Hyperpop
- Works: Food House discography
- Years active: 2020–present
- Label: Dog Show
- Members: Fraxiom; Gupi

Food House (stylized in all lowercase) is an American musical duo formed in 2020 in Boston by the electronic music producers Fraxiom and Gupi. Best known for their debut album Food House, they influenced and helped popularize the hyperpop scene during the COVID-19 pandemic.

Fraxiom, from Massachusetts, met Gupi, from California, while performing for a rave in 2017. They became close friends after Gupi moved to Massachusetts. They first collaborated on the song "Thos Moser", which Dylan Brady of 100 gecs released on his label Dog Show Records in February 2020. The song quickly became popular in the hyperpop scene. Fraxiom was compelled by the COVID-19 pandemic to pause her (Note: Fraxiom uses they/them and she/her pronouns. This article uses she/her pronouns for consistency.) studies at the School of the Art Institute of Chicago and quarantine with Gupi in Massachusetts. The two formed Food House and created a self-titled debut album. Food House was preceded by two singles and was released by Dog Show in October. After a period of inactivity involving frustrations with the music industry, the duo created a second album in different cities. The album, titled Two House, was released independently in February 2025.

Music critics describe Food House as a hyperpop duo. Their music is characterized by chaotic electronic production, absurdist humor, and frequent cultural references. Food House was inspired by Internet videos the duo watched, earlier pop music, and contemporary experimental music. Its creative process was often spontaneous. The album contains many skits and references, but also emotional lyrics discussing personal issues. Critics thought that Two House contained further emotional depth.

== History ==
Fraxiom grew up in Kingston, Massachusetts, and by 2017, had gathered a small following around her nightcore and electronic music. Gupi grew up in San Diego, California, with their (Note: Gupi uses they/them pronouns.) father Tony Hawk. They performed in a rock band in high school but eventually left to focus on electronic music production, releasing an extended play (EP) through a friend's music label. The two met in August 2017 in Orlando, Florida, during a rave that Fraxiom performed for. By the end of the month, Gupi began their first semester at Berklee College of Music in Boston, closer to where Fraxiom lived. They spent more time together and became close friends. They did not initially collaborate on music; Gupi felt self-conscious about producing hyperpop around roommates. However, the two did DJ together at parties at MAGFest in Washington, D.C.

Fraxiom and Gupi first collaborated on the song "Thos Moser", named for the eponymous furniture company, which they finished on Halloween in 2019. The two intended for the song to be an inside joke among their friends and expected it to stay within their inner circle. Fraxiom shared the song privately with friends, who responded so positively that she hurried to complete her debut solo EP, Music. She stated: "I wanted to have one more thing out before 'Thos Moser' raised the bar and made me scared to release things." Gupi planned to release the song as a single for their debut solo album, None. Initially, Gupi sent a version of None without "Thos Moser" to Dylan Brady of 100 gecs, anticipating that he would release the album on his record label Dog Show Records, a subsidiary of Diplo's Mad Decent. Brady enjoyed the album, and later "Thos Moser", and agreed. Dog Show released the song alongside a music video on February 18, 2020. "Thos Moser" popularized Fraxiom and Gupi within the hyperpop scene. Noah Simon of The Line of Best Fit called it "one of the first major dominoes [...] that led to hyperpop's eruption." By October 2020, it had amassed 350,000 views on YouTube and over a million streams on Spotify, where it was featured on the streaming service's "Hyperpop" playlist.

The success of "Thos Moser" motivated Fraxiom and Gupi to create an album together, as did the COVID-19 pandemic. Fraxiom had moved to Chicago, Illinois, in January 2020 to study sound at the School of the Art Institute of Chicago (SAIC) and to perform at music venues. However, the pandemic forced the school to evacuate dormitories in late March, which compelled Fraxiom to take the semester off and return to Massachusetts; she thought it would be convenient to quarantine with Gupi and create an album together. Fraxiom lived with Gupi for most of the spring, and the two formed the duo Food House, named for their frequent use of Uber Eats. In April, the duo played a demo of the song "Ride" during Square Garden, a music festival hosted by 100 gecs in the video game Minecraft. Fraxiom moved to Chicago again in June, although fully dropped out of the SAIC to focus on her music career. Gupi moved to Orlando before the album's release to live with their partner. On September 12, Fraxiom played "Ride" during her set at Appleville, a livestream festival hosted by A. G. Cook to promote his album Apple. In late September, Food House released "Ride" alongside a music video as the lead single to their self-titled debut album. The duo released another single, "Mos Thoser", in October. Dog Show released Food House on October 29. Simon declared Food House the 13th best hyperpop album of all time in 2022, and Pitchfork and KTLA retrospectively described it as a holy text within the genre.

The duo mostly stopped releasing songs after Food House. The hyperpop scene dispersed, and they reckoned with personal issues and the expectations of the music industry. Their experiences with Dog Show and Mad Decent while releasing Food House had stressed them; Fraxiom said in an interview with Pitchfork: "Oh, so y'all are just gonna get a 50% cut of this really awesome, borderline genre-defining art we made, but you're not gonna help us with touring, advertising, A&R, or anything that an industry person is actually supposed to do?" The duo eventually began working on a second album, mostly in different cities. Gupi produced nearly the entire album and, unlike Food House, recorded some vocals for it. Food House released their second album, Two House, independently on February 28, 2025. Two House received positive reviews from Pitchfork and KTLA.

== Musical style ==
Music critics describe Food House as a hyperpop duo. Their music is characterized by chaotic electronic production, absurdist humor, and frequent references to popular culture and Internet culture. Russell Falcon of KTLA described their music as "3OH!3, SpongeBob SquarePants, Nicki Minaj, metal, and original Twitter put into a musical blender by the Joker."

"Thos Moser" features a house beat with loud hi-hats and frequently changing synths. Fraxiom raps with a deadpan tone and heavy Auto-Tune about the duo's antics in Boston. She references Caroline Polachek, a 100 gecs show at New York University where tiles fell from the roof, and threatens to urinate on Zedd. "Ride" originated from a tweet that Fraxiom posted: "Too shy to ask [Gupi] to make a Drain Gang-type beat". Gupi saw the tweet and produced a beat that impressed Fraxiom, who spontaneously thought of a hook. The song features a trap instrumental and electric guitar. Fraxiom references Degrassi, cannabis, and the fourth dimension and recalls riding scooters around Target and CVS Pharmacy parking lots at night.

In an interview with Paper, Gupi described the duo's creative process while making Food House:

Other times, we'll see a funny Twitter video where it's like, "Oh no, I accidentally turned the bass up too loud while the music is playing," and then we're like, "Let's make a beat that sounds like this." We watched a lot of YouTube during quarantine, a lot of Degrassi, How It's Made and food processing machine videos. Those always have funny, royalty-free music in them and we're like, "Oh let's make something like this," and Frax writes all the lyrics in 10 minutes and it happens.

Food House was inspired by pop music by the Black Eyed Peas, Far East Movement, and Kesha that the duo considered fun and timeless, as well as later music by Drain Gang, PC Music, 100 gecs, and on SoundCloud. The album is sonically varied. Matt Moen of Paper compared it to "mainlining cringe comps and bass-boosted TikToks all while listening to every top 10 pop hit between the years of 2010 and 2013 at the same time." According to Moen, the lyrics contain a "staggering" number of skits and pop culture references. In one track, Siri confirms that Ronald Reagan is still dead, and in another, Fraxiom discusses baby food before Gupi screams at her to "just sing real lyrics". Even so, Simon thought the album was equally playful and emotional. Fraxiom discusses her frustration with consumerism and her struggles with depression, addiction, and gender identity throughout the lyrics. Simon recalled that the duo once performed in Brooklyn, and Fraxiom shouted to the audience, "This is a queer album!"

Two House is characterized by maximalist electronic production, though Falcon thought the album was overall softer than Food House and that the large soundscape was given more pacing. Fraxiom references urbanism YouTube channels, Atlanta public transit, sexts by Adam Levine, the CEO of PepsiCo, and Sonic the Hedgehog characters. Still, critics thought the album contained the duo's most emotional lyrics. Fraxiom discusses abusive friendships and parental transphobia, responds to criticism of the duo, and disses adversaries. Colin Joyce of Pitchfork said that "surprisingly vulnerable moments" are found across the record: "but Food House never dwell for too long; soon, they're back to rapping about Animal Crossing characters."

== Discography ==
=== Studio albums ===
- Food House (2020)
- Two House (2025)
