= Dorian Electra =

American singer-songwriter (born 1992)

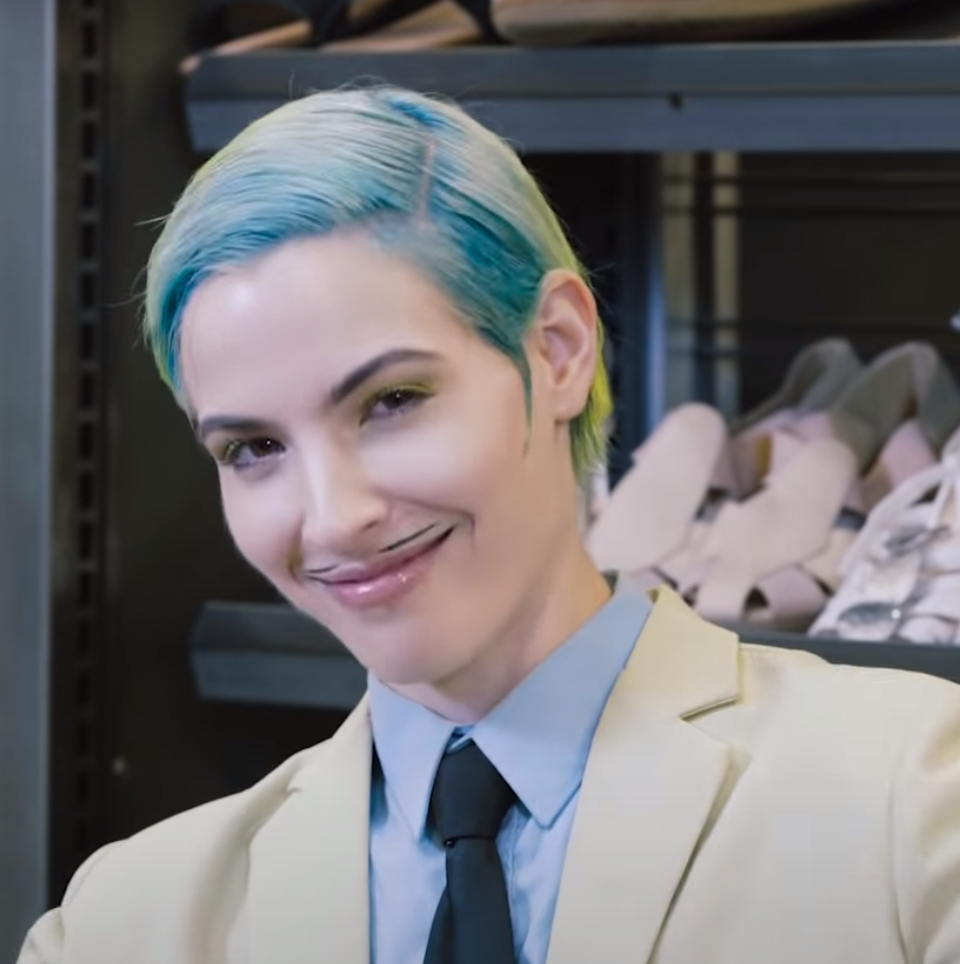
- Electra in 2018

Background information
- Born: Dorian Electra Fridkin Gomberg; June 25, 1992 (age 34); Houston, Texas, U.S.
- Genres: Experimental pop; hyperpop; futurepop; avant-pop; alt-pop
- Occupations: Singer; songwriter
- Years active: 2009–present
- Website: www.dorianelectra.com

Dorian Electra Fridkin Gomberg (born June 25, 1992) is an American singer and songwriter. Electra is known for their (Note: Electra is non-binary and uses they/them pronouns.) non-conforming fashion, queer aesthetics, and experimental pop sound. Their debut studio album, Flamboyant, was released in 2019, followed by their second studio album, My Agenda, in 2020. They released their third studio album, Fanfare, in 2023. Electra is genderfluid and uses they/them pronouns.

== Early life ==
Electra was born in Houston, Texas, to a Jewish family. Their father, Paul Gomberg (known as "the Rockstar Realtor" in Houston), is originally from Beverly Hills. Their mother, Paula Fridkin, is an artist and jewelry designer. Electra graduated from School of the Woods, a Montessori high school in Houston, where they were the founder of their high school's philosophy club. They attended Shimer College, a Great Books school in Chicago, Illinois, from 2010 to 2014.

== Career ==
=== 2010–2017: Early videos and first singles ===
Electra first drew national attention in 2010 with the music video "I'm in Love with Friedrich Hayek", which lauded the philosophy of the Austrian economist Friedrich Hayek and garnered commentary from the modern Austrian theory professor Steven Horwitz. In 2011, they released two more videos, "Roll with the Flow" and "We Got it 4 Cheap". Both were covered by mainstream political media. "We Got it 4 Cheap" came in second in the Lloyd V. Hackley Endowment's "Supply and Demand Video Contest". In 2012, they interned at production company Emergent Order. Emergent Order had previously published "Fear the Boom and Bust", a similar Hayek-oriented rap video. Electra then produced a new, similarly economics-oriented pop video, "FA$T CA$H", with the support of an award from the Moving Picture Institute. In September 2012, Electra released the music video "Party Milk", which they describe as an attempt to merge common party scene symbolism with something one would never associate with a party, but that everyone is familiar with in another context.

In 2014, Electra (as Dorian Electra & the Electrodes) released a music video called "What Mary Didn't Know", based on Frank Jackson's philosophical thought experiment of the same name (from 1986). 2015 saw the release of Electra's video "Forever Young: A Love Song to Ray Kurzweil", a tribute to the futurist Ray Kurzweil. In 2016, Electra released "Ode to the Clitoris" on Refinery29, detailing the scientific history of the clitoris, from Ancient Greece through to modern, 3D models. In an interview, Electra stated it was to "desensitize people to the word CLITORIS and help bring it more into popular consciousness." In June 2016 Electra released "Mind Body Problem" through Bullett Media, a song and video "about femininity as a performance—when being a 'woman' feels like putting on a costume and the costume doesn't seem to come off with the clothes". Electra was also creating a web series, at the time, under their drag king persona 'Don Bogman', a used car salesman.

Electra continued their music video series, via Refinery29, about intersectional feminism and queer histories with "The History of Vibrators" (2016), the "Dark History of High Heels" (2016), "2000 Years of Drag" (2016), and "Control" (2017). These videos focused on the histories of intersectional feminist and queer issues, collaborating with many artists, including Imp Queen, London Jade, The Vixen, Lucy Stoole, Eva Young, Zuri Marley, K Rizz, and Chynna. "2000 Years of Drag" was accepted and screened at The East Village Queer Film Festival, NewFest, Fringe! Queer Film & Arts Fest, TWIST: Seattle Queer Film Festival, Austin Gay & Lesbian International Film Festival (aGLIFF), Art All Night - Trenton: 6th Annual Film Festival, Desperado LGBT Film Festival, QUEER-Streifen Regensburg, Filmfest homochrom, Flatpack Film Festival, and CINEMQ.

In 2017, Electra released the single "Jackpot" through Grindr's digital publication Into More, a song that "addresses gender fluidity, but in a more subtle, less explicitly educational way." Later that year, Electra was featured on the Charli XCX track "Femmebot", with Mykki Blanco, on the mixtape Pop 2.

=== 2018–2022: Flamboyant and My Agenda ===
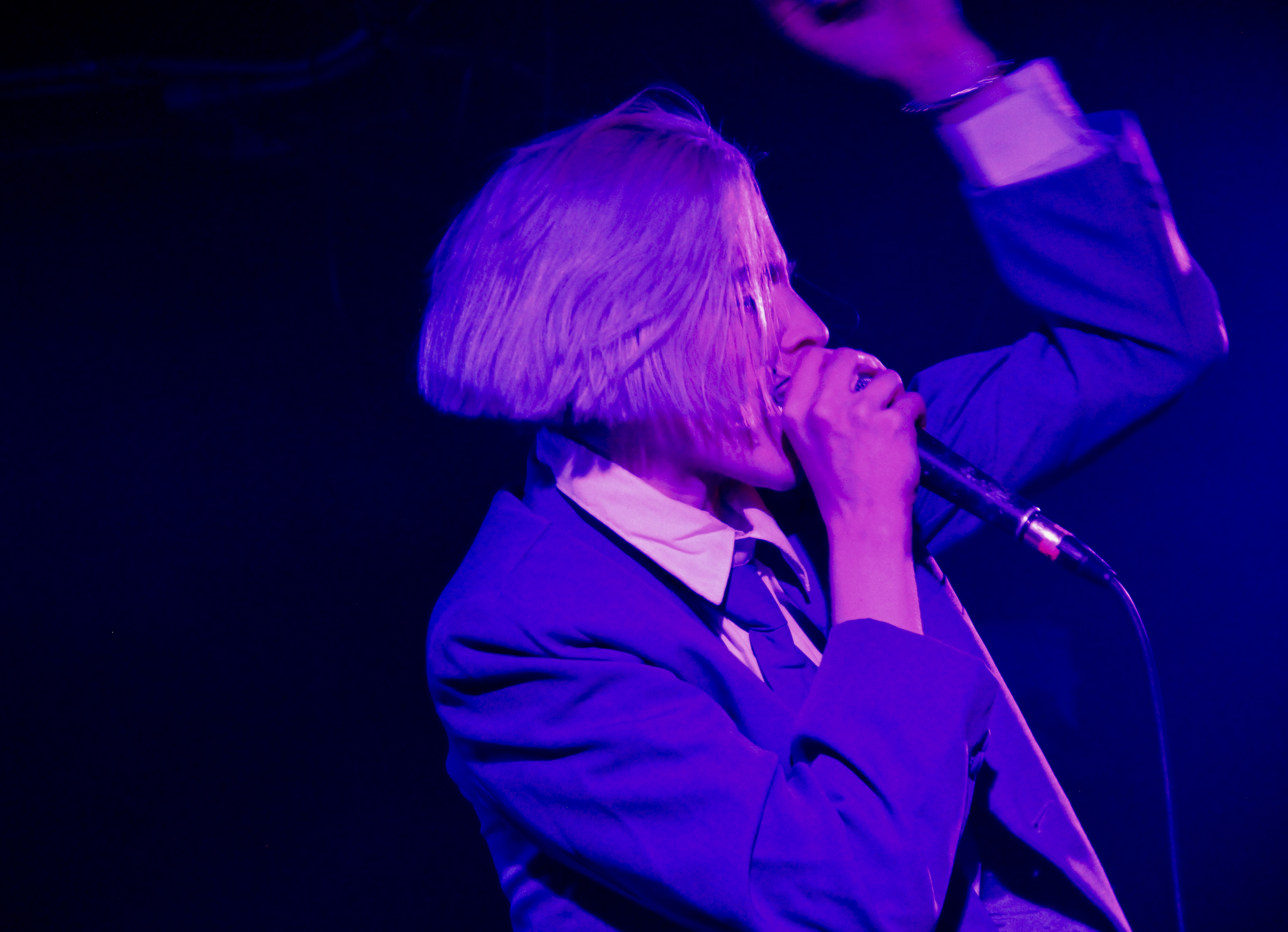
Electra performing in 2018

In 2018, Electra released three new tracks, "Career Boy", "VIP", and "Man to Man". Electra's frequent creative collaborator, Weston Allen, co-directed and edited this music video series.

In 2019, Electra released their debut album, Flamboyant. In August 2019, Electra embarked on the Flamboyant: Chapter I Tour, which lasted until November 2019. They began the second leg, Flamboyant: Chapter II, in early 2020. However, in March of the same year, the rest of the tour dates were postponed due to COVID-19 restrictions.

In 2020, Electra released the single "Thirsty (For Love)", a collaboration with fans. They also released a deluxe version of Flamboyant later that year. Following this, they released the singles "Sorry Bro (I Love You)", "Give Great Thanks", "Gentleman", and "M'Lady".

On September 21, 2020, Electra announced their second studio album My Agenda, featuring appearances from Rebecca Black, Sega Bodega, Lil Mariko, Mood Killer, Faris Badwan, Pussy Riot, Village People, and Dylan Brady, among others. It was released on October 16, 2020, and is described as exploring "crisis in masculinity". The satirical project had visuals parodying online conservative subcultures, featuring alt-right conspiracy theories, alpha males, and trilby-donning incels.

=== 2023–present: Fanfare ===
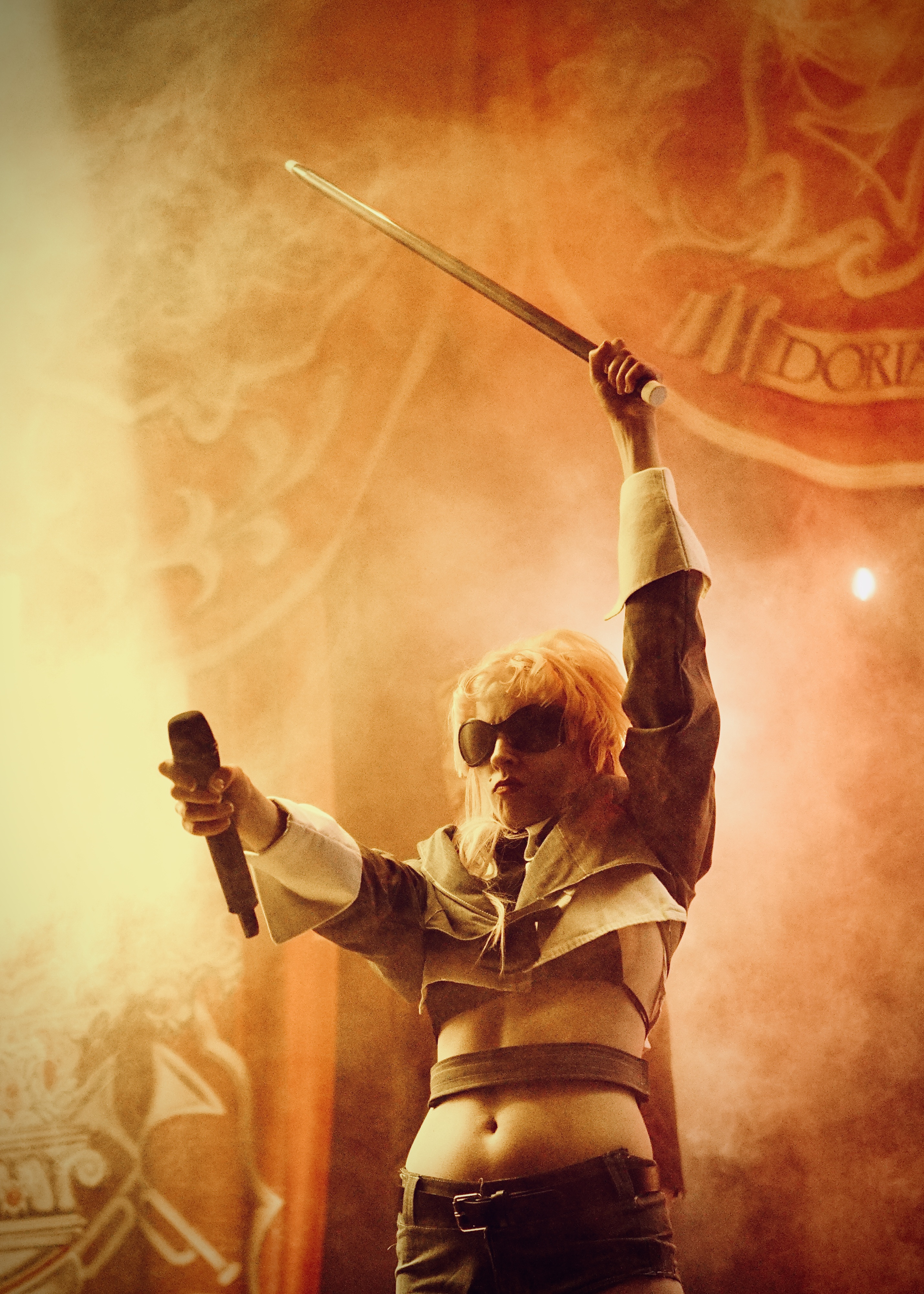
Electra performing in 2024

On April 7, 2023, Electra released the single "Freak Mode". It was followed by "Sodom & Gomorrah" on June 2. On July 19, they released the single "Anon" and announced their third studio album Fanfare for October 6. Two more singles, "Puppet" and "Idolize", were released on August 31 and on October 3, respectively. All five singles were accompanied by music videos. Fanfare explores themes of celebrity and fandom in the social media age. On October 13, Electra announced Fanfare: The World Tour, which was scheduled to visit the Americas and Europe and lasted from October 2023 to March 2024.

== Personal life ==
Electra is queer and genderfluid, and uses they/them pronouns. They have been diagnosed with attention deficit hyperactivity disorder.

== Discography ==
Dorian Electra discography
- Studio albums: 4
- Singles: 30
- Demos: 1
- Instrumental: 1

=== Albums ===
==== Studio albums ====
Title	Album details
Flamboyant	Released: July 17, 2019; Label: Self-released; Formats: LP, CD, digital download, streaming
My Agenda	Released: October 16, 2020; Label: Self-released, Supernature; Format: LP, CD, digital download, streaming
Fanfare	Released: October 6, 2023; Label: Self-released, Ingrooves; Format: LP, CD, digital download, streaming
Dorian Electra	Released: April 22, 2026; Label: Self-released; Format: CD, digital download, streaming

==== Instrumental albums ====
Title	Album details
Flamboyant Deluxe (Instrumentals)	Released: May 1, 2020; Label: Self-released; Formats: streaming

==== Demo albums ====
Title	Album details
Flamboyant ~ Voice Memos	Released: May 14, 2020; Label: Self-released; Formats: streaming

=== Singles ===
==== As lead artist ====
Title	Year	Album
"Clitopia"	2016	Non-album singles
"Mind Body Problem"	2016	Non-album singles
"Vibrator"	2016	Non-album singles
"High Heels"	2016	Non-album singles
"Drag" (featuring Imp Queen, Lucy Stoole, Eva Young, the Vixen, & London Jade)	2016	Non-album singles
"Jackpot"	2017	Non-album singles
"Control" (featuring Zuri Marley, Chynna, K Rizz and London Jade)	2017	Non-album singles
"VIP" (featuring K Rizz)	2018	Non-album singles
"Career Boy"	2018	Flamboyant
"Man To Man"	2018	Flamboyant
"2 Fast"	2019	Non-album single
"Flamboyant"	2019	Flamboyant
"Daddy Like"	2019	Flamboyant
"Thirsty (For Love)"	2020	Non-album single
"Sorry Bro (I Love You)"	2020	My Agenda
"Give Great Thanks"	2020	My Agenda
"Gentleman"	2020	My Agenda
"M'Lady"	2020	My Agenda
"Edgelord" (featuring Rebecca Black)	2020	My Agenda
"My Agenda" (featuring Village People and Pussy Riot)	2020	My Agenda
"Positions"	2021	Non-album singles
"Ram It Down" (Lil Texas Remix) (featuring Mood Killer, Lil Mariko, and Lil Texas)	2021	Non-album singles
"Happy" (featuring 645AR)	2021	Non-album singles
"Feels Like We Only Go Backwards"	2021	Non-album singles
"M'Lady" (S3RL Remix) (featuring Kero Kero Bonito)	2021	My Agenda (Deluxe)
"Gentleman" (d0llywood1 Remix) (featuring Danny Brown)	2021	My Agenda (Deluxe)
"Barbie Boy" (ElyOtto Remix)	2021	My Agenda (Deluxe)
"Iron Fist" (Alice Glass Remix) (featuring Faris Badwan)	2021	My Agenda (Deluxe)
"My Agenda" (Anamanaguchi Remix) (featuring Village People and Pussy Riot)	2022	My Agenda (Deluxe)
"Freak Mode"	2023	Fanfare
"Sodom & Gomorrah"	2023	Fanfare
"Anon"	2023	Fanfare
"Puppet"	2023	Fanfare
"Idolize"	2023	Fanfare
"Fake Denim"	2026	Non-album singles
"Shutting Up"	2026	Non-album singles
"Mr. Tambourine Man"	2026	Dorian Electra
"Feel Good Inc."	2026	Dorian Electra
"Young Folks"	2026	Dorian Electra
"Scarborough Fair"	2026	Dorian Electra

==== As a featured artist ====
Title	Year	Album
"Femmebot" (Charli XCX featuring Dorian Electra)	2017	Pop 2
"Open My Eyes" (Ravenna Golden featuring Dorian Electra)	2018	Non-album single
"Gec 2 Ü (Remix)" (100 gecs featuring Dorian Electra)	2020	1000 Gecs & The Tree of Clues
"Teenage Dirtbag" (Sega Bodega featuring Dorian Electra)	2020	Reestablishing Connections
"Friday (Remix)" (Rebecca Black featuring 3OH!3, Big Freedia and Dorian Electra)	2021	Non-album singles
"Toxic" (Pussy Riot featuring Dorian Electra and Dylan Brady)	2021	Non-album singles
"Loveline Remix" (Zolita featuring Dorian Electra and Petal Supply)	2021	Evil Angel (Deluxe)
"My Wife's Boyfriend" (Club Cringe featuring Dorian Electra)	2021	Cringe Compilation #2
"Notice Me" (S3RL featuring Dorian Electra and Nikolett)	2022	Non-album single
"I Like U" (Dorian Electra Remix) (Tove Lo featuring Dorian Electra)	2023	Dirt Femme (Extended Cut) and I Like U (Remixes)
"On 1" (Safety Trance featuring Dorian Electra)	2024	Non-album single
"UFO" Remix (f5ve featuring Dorian Electra) ft. Dorian Electra and Count Baldor	2025	Non-album single

=== Other charted songs ===
Title	Year	Peak chart positions	Album
Title	Year	US Dance	Album
"Replay (Dorian Electra Remix)" (Lady Gaga featuring Dorian Electra)	2021	28	Dawn of Chromatica

== Awards and nominations ==
Award Ceremony	Year	Nominated work	Category	Result
Berlin Music Video Awards	2020	Adam & Steve	Best Song	Nominated

== Music videos ==
- "I'm in Love with Friedrich Hayek" (2010)
- "Roll with the Flow" (2011)
- "We Got It 4 Cheap" (2011)
- "Party Milk"
- "Fast Ca$h" (2012)
- "What Mary Didn't Know" (2015)
- "Forever Young: A Love Song To Ray Kurzweil" (2015)
- "Ode to the Clitoris" (2016)
- "Mind Body Problem" (2016)
- "The History of Vibrators" (2016)
- "Dark History of High Heels" (2016)
- "2000 Years of Drag" (2016)
- "Control" (2017)
- "Jackpot" (2017)
- "Career Boy" (2018)
- "V.I.P." (feat. K Rizz) (2018)
- "Man to Man" (2018)
- "Flamboyant" (2019)
- "Daddy Like" (2019)
- "Adam & Steve" (2019)
- "Guyliner" (2020)
- "Malibu" (Guest appearance) (2020)
- "Sorry Bro (I Love You)" (2020)
- "Give Great Thanks" (2020)
- "Gentleman / M'Lady" (2020)
- "Edgelord" (feat. Rebecca Black) (2020)
- "F the World" (2020)
- "Friday (Remix)" (Guest appearance) (2021)
- "Shape of You" (Ed Sheeran cover) (2021)
- "Positions" (Ariana Grande cover) (2021)
- "Ram It Down" (feat. Mood Killer, Lil Mariko & Lil Texas) (2021)
- "Feels Like We Only Go Backwards" (Tame Impala cover) (2021)
- "Happy" (Pharrell Williams cover) (feat. 645AR) (2021)
- "My Agenda" (feat. Village People & Pussy Riot) (2021)
- "My Agenda" (Anamanaguchi Remix) (feat. Village People & Pussy Riot) (2022)
- "Shinigami Eyes" (Grimes song) (Guest appearance) (2022)
- "Freak Mode" (2023)
- "Sodom & Gomorrah" (2023)
- "anon" (2023)
- "Puppet" (2023)
- "Idolize" (2023)
- "Fake Denim" (2026)
- "Shutting Up" (2026)
- "Mr. Tambourine Man" (2026)
- "Feel Good Inc." (Gorillaz cover) (2026)
- "Young Folks" (2026)
