= The Garden (band) =

American experimental rock band

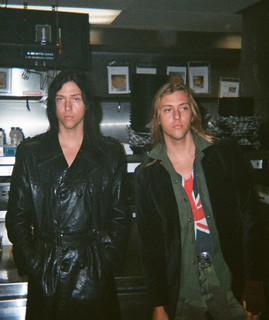
- The Garden on Tour in 2024; From left: Wyatt and Fletcher Shears

Background information
- Origin: Orange, California, U.S.
- Genres: Experimental indie rock; art punk; electronic; alternative rock
- Years active: 2011–present
- Labels: Epitaph Records; Vada Vada; Burger Records; Hostage Records
- Members: Wyatt Shears; Fletcher Shears
- Website: thegardenvadavada.com

The Garden is an American experimental punk rock band from Orange County, California, formed in 2011 by twin brothers Wyatt and Fletcher Shears. The duo released their debut album The Life and Times of a Paperclip in 2013, with several smaller releases following. In 2015, the group released their second studio album Haha along with the lead single "All Smiles Over Here :)" to critical acclaim after being signed to Epitaph Records. The brothers have toured across the United States, Europe, the United Kingdom, China, Japan, New Zealand, Australia, Canada, and Mexico. Additionally, the duo performed at Coachella in both 2019 and 2023.

== History ==
=== 2011–2013: Formation, debut album and EPs ===
Twin brothers, Wyatt Shears and Fletcher Shears formed the Garden in 2011, when they were seventeen years old. The group's name is meant to be a metaphor for their music "growing" and evolving. Originally, the brothers intended for the Garden to be a side project of their three-piece band M.H.V (Ms. Hannah's Victims), which they later abandoned to pursue the Garden full-time. Shortly after the duo started performing as the Garden, in May 2012 they released their self-titled debut EP on cassette while still signed to their previous band's label, Burger Records. followed by Everything Is Perfect (another EP) that December. The song "I'm a Woman" was released alongside a music video in late 2012. Their debut album, The Life and Times of a Paperclip, came out in July 2013. A month later, they put out the Rules EP, featuring "Spirit Chant" (previously on Everything Is Perfect) and "Get Me My Blade", which had been released alongside a music video earlier that year.

=== 2014–2015: The Vadaverse Platforms and haha ===
The twins went on to release several more singles in 2013 and 2014, as well as two songs titled "Crystal Clear" (released both in January, with B-side "Slice Em", and April 2014) that would eventually appear on their then-upcoming second album. These two tracks would later be put on their three triple-single compilation - The Vadaverse Platforms; collectively released same-day in June 2014, separately physical on three separate labels, shortly following a video for a track that appears on all three; "Crystal Clear". In December 2014, the Garden released a 7" titled "Surprise!", featuring the B-side "This Could Build Us a Home"; a future cut off of what was next for the Garden.

In 2015, they signed to Epitaph Records and premiered the track "I Want That Nose I Saw On TV", with media coverage describing the band as maintaining a “punk spirit” in their music and visual aesthetic. Later in August 2015, they announced their second studio album haha, simultaneously with the release of the lead single "All Smiles Over Here :)". The band released several additional singles and accompanying music videos throughout 2015 in the lead-up to haha, which was released on October 9, 2015.

=== 2016–2017: U Want The Scoop? ===
In 2016, they released a string of singles, including "Play Your Cards Right" (featuring Crazy 8). This was the first music video appearance of the band to be seen wearing jester face paint. The Garden initially wore jester face paint on stage prior to the video release for the first time at SXSW 2016 in Austin, Texas at Hotel Vegas. "Call This # Now" and "California Here We Go" were released during this period as well, coinciding with a full North America tour, a later "BIG$HOT JACKPOT TOUR", and Camp Flog Gnaw Carnival appearances, before releasing the U Want the Scoop? EP in March 2017; following the first single and music video for the EP, All Access and later releasing "Clay" with a music video. During September 2017, the Garden supported Mac Demarco on a full-scale US tour. Their set was reviewed as "wild and infectious enthusiasm", playing high-energy garage/punk material each night.

=== 2018: Mirror Might Steal Your Charm ===
On January 24, 2018, the Garden released the single "No Destination" on Epitaph Records with an accompanying music video. On February 27, they released a new music video for the single "Stallion", and announced their new album, Mirror Might Steal Your Charm, was set to release on March 30. A third single, "Call the Dogs Out", came out three days before the album's release on March 27. They also played songs from the album at the ARTE concert in 2018.

=== 2020: Kiss My Super Bowl Ring ===
The band announced the release date of their fourth studio album, Kiss My Super Bowl Ring, on January 16, 2020. The announcement was supported by the album's first single, "Clench to Stay Awake". The album was released on March 13, 2020, and features production from 100 gecs member Dylan Brady and samples of Carrot Top. Pitchfork described the album as "proudly defiant", noting its unconventional structure, and described it as fusing "'80s-inspired hardcore with playful electronics", with the Shears brothers' bass-and-drums duo. NME described the album as having a "restless brand of creativity" and a "collage of scattered, urgent art-rock", highlighting its experimental production and its role in pushing the band's increasingly chaotic, assemblage-based style forward.

=== 2022–2023: Horseshit on Route 66 and One Strange Night in Orange County ===
The singles "Freight Yard", "Orange County Punk Rock Legend", and "Chainsaw the Door" were released ahead of their fifth studio album, Horseshit on Route 66, which was released on September 8, 2022. During their touring season following the release of the album, the Garden performed at the 22nd Coachella Valley Music and Arts Festival in April 2023.

On July 22, 2023, the band curated its first boutique music festival, One Strange Night in Orange County, at the Observatory OC Festival Grounds in Santa Ana, California. The Garden headlined the event, which also featured a supporting line-up including JPEGMAFIA, the Adicts, Alice Glass, and 45 Grave.

=== 2024: Six Desperate Ballads ===
In June 2024, the Garden announced the release of their first single of the year titled "Filthy Rabbit Hole" described as a West Coast lo-fi hardcore punk track from the 1980s. In September, another single along with a music video was announced for the track "Ballet" with a confirmation for an upcoming extended play. The music video for "Ballet" guest starred Dinah Cancer the lead vocalist from the 1980s Los Angeles horror punk band 45 Grave. These singles were released ahead of their fifth extended play Six Desperate Ballads, which released on October 30, 2024.

=== 2025-present: "Ugly", One Strange Night in Orange County II, and Bootleg ===
The Garden released the single “Ugly”, described as a melodic punk track, on November 6, 2025, accompanied by a music video. The music video for "Ugly" was filmed in Tonopah, Nevada. Filming locations included one of Nevada’s most well-known reportedly haunted hotels, the Mizpah Hotel and the historic Tonopah cemetery adjacent to the Clown Motel. "Ugly" was released on 7" white vinyl for their first single pressing to date.

The band curated their second annual boutique music festival in Orange County at the Observatory OC Festival Grounds on July 19, 2025. The Garden headlined with a supporting line-up consisting of Snow Strippers, Ceremony, L7, Fear, and Hong Kong Fuck You!.

On May 14, 2026, the Garden announced their sixth studio album titled Bootleg along with a single, "5 Mile Ponytail". The album was released on July 10, 2026. The Garden announced they will be supporting the Strokes that August at a series of stadium shows.

== Musical style ==
The band is known for their fast, punk-influenced two-piece bass and drum songs. At some point Wyatt has stated he uses both bass and guitar, but most people did not notice because of his playing style and use of low notes. Their later music contains synth in addition to or instead of the guitar and drums. The brothers classify their sound as "Vada Vada", a philosophy which Wyatt Shears describes as "an idea that represents pure creative expression, that disregards all previously made genres and ideals". The twins have cited influence from artists such as American punk rock bands Minutemen and Big Boys, video game composer Manabu Namiki, underground cloud rap, Killing Joke, and country music singer Johnny Paycheck.

== Solo Endeavors and Side Projects ==
Outside of the Garden, both of the twin brothers individually have experimental solo music endeavors: Wyatt's being Enjoy and Fletcher's being Puzzle. The pair are also the creators of numerous other side projects, including Macabrae Plaza, Turkey, Penalty Kill, and The Romeos. As the sons of well-known punk rocker Steven Shears, the twins frequently perform with local Orange County punk groups, including Flipper and Final Conflict. Fletcher Shears also played drums for The Adicts and toured with them in 2025. The Shears twins are also high fashion models, having campaigned and walked runway for high fashion luxury brands such as Yves Saint Laurent, Hugo Boss, Ugg, Balenciaga, and Ann Demeulemeester.

== Personal Life ==
Wyatt and Fletcher Shears were born on October 28, 1993, in Orange County California to Steven and Marcy Shears. Their passion for punk rock was instilled by their father at an early age, Shears having performed in bands like Shattered Faith, Final Conflict, and Knucklehead around Southern California when the twins were young. Fletcher is older than Wyatt by 8 minutes. They have one younger brother, Owen Shears, who is also involved in the punk rock scene and is the creator of Deterioration Records, a SoCal & OC based record label. The pair's romantic partners are also musicians in the Vada Vada verse, Wyatt having been performing with and dating Texas-native Cowgirl Clue (Ashley Calhoun) since the early 2010's. In a September 2026 Instagram post, it was confirmed that Fletcher married Marina Thompson in 2025, his girlfriend of over ten years who performs electronic music for the Vada Vada record label under the name 3L3D3P.

== Discography ==
Studio albums

- The Life and Times of a Paperclip (2013)
- haha (2015)
- Mirror Might Steal Your Charm (2018)
- Kiss My Super Bowl Ring (2020)
- Horseshit on Route 66 (2022)
- Bootleg (2026)

EPs

- The Garden (2011)
- Burger Records Tape (2012)
- Everything Is Perfect (2012)
- Rules (2013)
- U Want the Scoop? (2017)
- Six Desperate Ballads (2024)

Compilations

- Animatronic Figure in the Distance (2014)
- The Vadaverse Platforms (2014)
