= Rico Nasty discography =

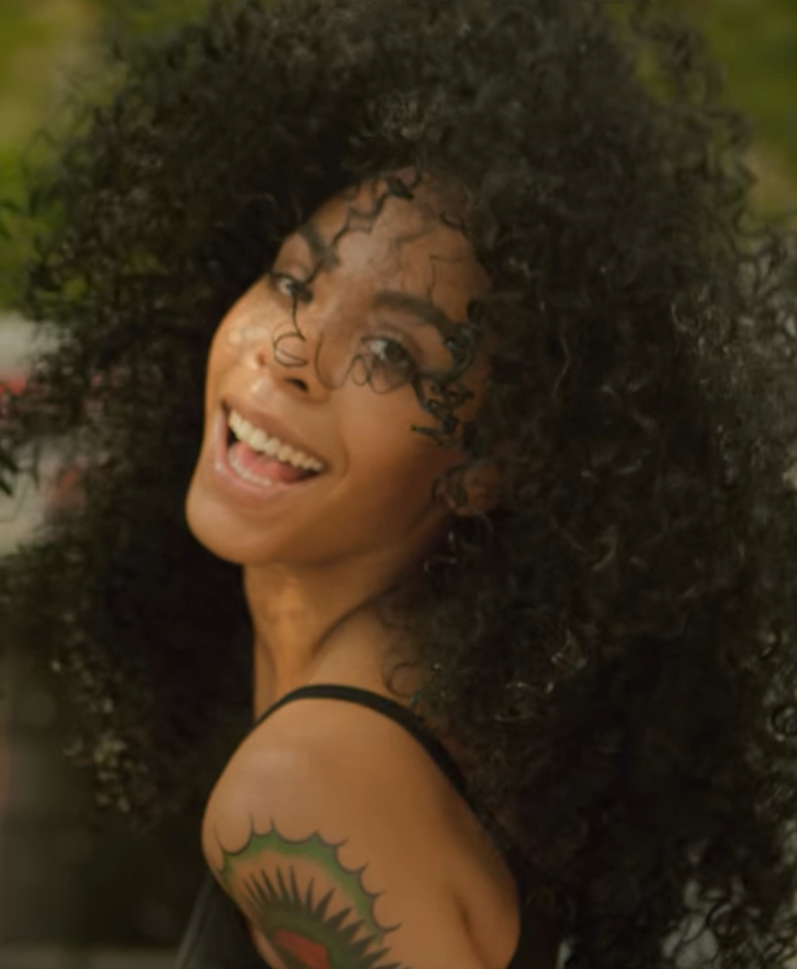
- Rico Nasty in 2018
- Studio albums: 3
- Singles: 76
- Music videos: 45
- Mixtapes: 7
- Extended plays: 2
- Promotional singles: 1

The discography of Rico Nasty, an American rapper, consists of three studio albums, seven mixtapes, two extended plays, 76 singles (including 36 as a featured artist), one promotional single, and 45 music videos. While in high school, she self-released her debut mixtape, Summer's Eve (2014). This release was followed by several more independent mixtapes, including The Rico Story (2016), Sugar Trap (2016), Tales of Tacobella (2017), and Sugar Trap 2 (2017).

Her major-label debut mixtape, Nasty (2018), was released under Atlantic Records. This was followed by her collaborative mixtape with producer Kenny Beats, Anger Management (2019). Her breakthrough single, "Smack a Bitch", released in 2018, was certified gold by the Recording Industry Association of America (RIAA) in June 2020, becoming her first career certification. Her debut studio album, Nightmare Vacation was released on December 4, 2020.

== Studio albums ==
List of albums, with selected chart positions, sales, and certifications
Title	Album details	Peak chart positions
Title	Album details	US Heat.
Nightmare Vacation	Released: December 4, 2020; Label: Atlantic, Sugar Trap; Formats: Vinyl, Digital download, streaming	1
Las Ruinas	Released: July 22, 2022; Label: Atlantic, Sugar Trap; Formats: Vinyl, CD, digital download, streaming	22
Lethal	Released: May 16, 2025; Label: Elektra, Fueled by Ramen; Formats: Vinyl, CD, digital download, streaming	–
RX	Released: July 24, 2026; Label: Sugar Trap; Formats: Vinyl, digital download, streaming	–

== Mixtapes ==
Title	Mixtape details
Summer's Eve	Released: 2014
The Rico Story	Released: 2016
Sugar Trap	Released: 2016
Tales of Tacobella	Released: May 19, 2017; Label: Sugar Trap; Formats: Digital download, streaming
Sugar Trap 2	Released: October 24, 2017; Label: Sugar Trap; Formats: Digital download, streaming
Nasty	Released: June 15, 2018; Label: Sugar Trap; Formats: LP, cassette, digital download, streaming
Anger Management (with Kenny Beats)	Released: April 25, 2019; Label: Sugar Trap; Formats: Digital download, streaming

== Extended plays ==
Title	EP Details
Ricos Archives (Note: This EP was released exclusively on SoundCloud.)	Released: September 6, 2021; Label: Sugar Trap; Format: Digital download, streaming
A Nasty Summer	Released: June 9, 2023; Label: X5 Music Group; Format: Digital download, streaming
Hardc0re Dr3amz (with Boys Noize)	Released: March 29, 2024; Label: Sugar Trap, Atlantic Records, Big Beat; Format: Digital download, streaming

== Singles ==
=== As lead artist ===
List of singles, with showing year released, certifications and album name
Title	Year	Certifications	Album(s)
"iCarly"	2016		The Rico Story
"Hey Arnold"	2016		Sugar Trap
"Hey Arnold (Remix)" (featuring Lil Yachty)	2016		Non-album single
"Moves"	2016		Tales of Tacobella
"Glo Bottles"	2017		Tales of Tacobella
"Block List"	2017		Tales of Tacobella
"Poppin"	2017		Sugar Trap 2
"Animals"	2017		Non-album single
"Key Lime OG" (solo or Shy Glizzy remix)	2017		Sugar Trap 2
"Rojo"	2017		Sugar Trap 2
"Blue"	2017		Sugar Trap 2
"Run It Up" (with Mafiaworldflaco)	2017		Non-album singles
"Party Goin Dumb"	2018		Non-album singles
"Smack a Bitch"	2018	RIAA: Platinum	Nightmare Vacation
"Trust Issues"	2018		Nasty
"Hit That"	2018		Non-album single
"Rage"	2018		Nasty
"Countin' Up"	2018		Nasty and A Nasty Summer
"Big Dick Energy"	2018		Non-album singles
"Wanna Do"	2018		Non-album singles
"Guap (LaLaLa)"	2018		Non-album singles
"Roof"	2019		Non-album singles
"Sandy"	2019		Non-album singles
"Time Flies"	2019		Non-album singles
"Welcome to the Party (NastyMix)"	2019		Non-album singles
"Fashion Week"	2019		Non-album singles
"Hard"	2019		Non-album singles
"IDGAF"	2020		Non-album singles
"Lightning"	2020		Non-album singles
"Popstar"	2020		Non-album singles
"Dirty"	2020		Insecure: Music and A Nasty Summer
"Aquí Yo Mando" (with Kali Uchis)	2020		Sin Miedo (del Amor y Otros Demonios)
"iPhone"	2020		Nightmare Vacation
"Own It"	2020		Nightmare Vacation
"Don't Like Me" (featuring Gucci Mane and Don Toliver)	2020		Nightmare Vacation
"OHFR?"	2020		Nightmare Vacation
"STFU"	2020		Nightmare Vacation
"Simp" (with Full Tac and Lil Mariko)	2021		Non-album singles
"Magic"	2021		Non-album singles
"Buss"	2021		Non-album singles
"Money" (featuring Flo Milli)	2021		Non-album singles
"Vaderz" (featuring Bktherula)	2022		Las Ruinas
"Intrusive"	2022		Las Ruinas
"Black Punk"	2022		Las Ruinas
"Blow Me"	2022		Las Ruinas
"Watch Your Man" (featuring Marshmello)	2022		Las Ruinas
"Turn It Up"	2023		Non-album single
"Arintintin" (with Boys Noize)	2024		Hardc0re Dr3amz
"Teethsucker (Yea3x)"	2025		Lethal
"On the Low"	2025		Lethal
"Butterfly Kisses"	2025		Lethal
"Can’t Win Em All"	2025		Lethal
"Pepper"	2025		Lethal (Deluxe)

=== As featured artist ===
List of singles as featured artist, with showing year released, peak chart positions and album name
Title	Year	Peak chart positions	Certifications	Album(s)
Title	Year	NZ Hot	Certifications	Album(s)
"Bestfriend" (Champagne Dame featuring Rico Nasty)	2016	—		Life of Dame 2
"No Reason" (Yunggt3z featuring Big Tee and Rico Nasty)	2016	—		Non-album single
"Taxes" (Bali Baby featuring Rico Nasty and Hoodrich Pablo Juan)	2016	—		Brazy Bali
"Another Jugg" (Jay Chris featuring Rico Nasty)	2016	—		Non-album singles
"Iggady (Remix)" (Bali Baby featuring Mallory Merk and Rico Nasty)	2016	—		Non-album singles
"Pimpin" (GL Ralph featuring Rico Nasty)	2017	—		Non-album singles
"They Won't Believe You" (Big Flock featuring Rico Nasty)	2017	—		Non-album singles
"Amigos" (Asian da Brat featuring Rico Nasty)	2017	—		Non-album singles
"Bruva" (Lil Dream featuring Rico Nasty)	2017	—		Non-album singles
"Get What I Want" (Tracy Nostra featuring Rico Nasty)	2017	—		Non-album singles
"Party" (London Dior featuring Rico Nasty)	2017	—		Non-album singles
"Suite Life" (DJ ClockWork featuring Rico Nasty, Kairose, and Deshon Taylor)	2018	—		Backroom
"Legit" (Krystle Maria featuring Rico Nasty)	2018	—		Non-album single
"Need More" (Rezt featuring Rico Nasty)	2018	—		Murrlin
"Rick and Morty" (Lil Phag featuring Rico Nasty and Dr. Woke)	2018	—		God Hates Lil Phag
"Barbie" (Big Mechoo featuring Fat Trel and Rico Nasty)	2018	—		They Callin' Me Mechoo
"Up Front" (Niqo featuring Rico Nasty)	2018	—		If I Could
"Coolin" (Barz da Lyricist featuring Rico Nasty)	2018	—		Non-album single
"Can't Tell Me Nothing" (Shaqeyah featuring Rico Nasty)	2018	—		Glow
"Brown Paper Bag 2.0" (Yoshi Flower featuring Rico Nasty)	2018	—		Brown Paper Bag (Maxi)
"S.I.C.K" (Dana featuring Rico Nasty)	2018	—		Non-album singles
"Excuse Me" (Swisha C featuring Rico Nasty)	2018	—		Non-album singles
"Forever" (GainesFM featuring Rico Nasty)	2018	—		Death of Fame
"Jawbreaker" (Injury Reserve featuring Rico Nasty and Pro Teens)	2019	—		Injury Reserve
"Tia Tamera" (Doja Cat featuring Rico Nasty)	2019	—	RIAA: Platinum	Amala (Deluxe Edition)
"Powerpuff Girls" (Kelow LaTesha featuring Rico Nasty and LightSkinKeisha)	2019	—		TSA
"Love Is Like a Moshpit" (Duckwrth featuring Rico Nasty and Medasin)	2019	—		The Falling Man
"#ProudCatOwnerRemix" (XXXTentacion featuring Rico Nasty)	2019	25		? (Deluxe Edition)
"Gucci Down (Remix)" (Xanman featuring Rico Nasty and Yung Manny)	2019	—		Non-album single
"FMU" (Brooke Candy featuring Rico Nasty)	2019	—		Sexorcism
"Stomp and Grind" (Grandma featuring Rico Nasty)	2019	—		Even If We Don't Get It Together
"Lighthouse" (Take a Daytrip featuring Slowthai, Rico Nasty, and IceColdBishop)	2019	—		Non-album single
"Psycho (Remix)" (Jucee Froot featuring Rico Nasty)	2020	—		Black Sheep
"Girl Crush" (Boys Noize featuring Rico Nasty)	2020	—		+/-
"Ringtone (Remix)" (100 gecs featuring Charli XCX, Rico Nasty, and Kero Kero Bonito)	2020	—		1000 Gecs and the Tree of Clues
"495" (IDK featuring YungManny, Big Flock, Big Jam, Rico Nasty, and Weensey)	2020	—		IDK & Friends 2
"Stand Out" (MallyDaGreat featuring Rico Nasty)	2020	—		TBA
"Hmp" (Freeco featuring Rico Nasty)	2020	—		Non-album singles
"LiLBiTcH" (Chillpill featuring Rico Nasty and Soleima)	2021	—		Non-album singles
"Jealous" (Mahalia featuring Rico Nasty)	2021	—		Non-album singles
"Wolfsbane" (Love Ghost featuring Rico Nasty)	2021			
"Moves" (Kidd Kenn featuring Rico Nasty)	2021	—		Problem Child
"Do a Bitch (Remix)" (Kali featuring Rico Nasty)	2021			TBA
"Art of War" (Jasiah featuring Denzel Curry and Rico Nasty)	2021			3
"High Heels" (Token featuring Rico Nasty)	2021			Pink is Better
"Jungle" (Fred Again.. featuring Rico Nasty)	2022			USB and Las Ruinas
"Shooting Star (Bars remix)" (XG featuring Rico Nasty)	2023			Non-album single
"War" (Nostalgix featuring Rico Nasty)	2023			Star City EP
"Scraps On" (lilbubblegum featuring Rico Nasty)	2024			Non-album single
"Thrills" (Peking Duk featuring Rico Nasty)	2026	24		Paradise

=== Promotional singles ===
Title	Year	Album
"Big Titties" (with Kenny Beats featuring Baauer and EarthGang)	2019	Anger Management and A Nasty Summer
"Pussy Poppin (I Don't Really Talk Like This)" (Sped Up Version)	2023	A Nasty Summer

== Guest appearances ==
List of non-single guest appearances, with other performing artists, showing year released and album name
Title	Year	Other artist(s)	Album
"Cash Hoe"	2016	Baby Ahk	Play
"Whatcha Say"	2017	Bali Baby	Brazy Bali
"With Me"	2017	3ohblack	Leggin or Nah 4
"Mamacita"	2017	Lil Yachty	The Fate of the Furious: The Album
"More Money Than You"	2017	Bounce Beat Black, Topdolla Sweizy	A Different Side
"Time"	2017	Chubby Chuck	Never Forget
"Touch Me"	2017	Maya Milan	11:11 Reloaded
"Lately"	2018	BbyMutha	Bbyshoe
"Rock$tar Famou$"	2018	Lil Aaron	Rock$tar Famou$
"Sugarparents"	2018	Aminé	OnePointFive
"On One"	2018	Father	Awful Swim
"Bad News"	2018	IDK	IDK & Friends :)
"Keep Heat"	2018	Warhol.SS	Chest Pains
"Remember Me"	2018	Key!, Kenny Beats	777 Deluxe
"Clowns"	2019	Aja	Box Office
"Mutumbo"	2019	10k.Caash	The Creator
"Butt Naked"	2019	ASAP Ferg	Floor Seats
"Haunted Bikini Bottom"	2019	10k.Caash, Matt Ox, Gun40	Scary Swajjur Stories
"DIET_"	2020	Denzel Curry, Kenny Beats	Unlocked
"Shot Caller"	2020	Hella Sketchy	Hella Sketchy
"Ankles"	2020	Jessie Reyez, Melii	Before Love Came to Kill Us (Deluxe)
"Shooters in Here (Remix)"	2020	GlockBoyKari	Heart Break Kid
"My Little Alien"	2020	none	Scoob! The Album
"Girls"	2020	Kyle	See You When I Am Famous
"Little Nokia (Remix)"	2020	Bree Runway	2000and4Eva
"Take It"	2020	Juicy J, Lord Infamous	The Hustle Continues
"In N Out"	2021	Jasiah, TheHxliday	War
"Speed It Up"	2021	NLE Choppa	F9: The Fast Saga
"Keto"	2021	IDK, The Neptunes, Swae Lee	USee4Yourself
"Ain't No Way"	2022	Denzel Curry, 6lack, JID, Jasiah	Melt My Eyez See Your Future
"Pay Day"	2022	Flo Milli	You Still Here, Ho?
"Swamp Bitches"	2022	Doechii	She / Her / Black Bitch
"Falling Off"	2022	Duke Deuce	Crunkstar
"Catwalk"	2022	Lil Cherry, Goldbuuda	Space Talk
"Scary"	2022	Megan Thee Stallion	Traumazine
"We Made It"	2023	Bktherula	LVL5 P1
"Dying"	2023	The Drums	Jonny
"Pop"	2024	Schoolboy Q	Blue Lips

== Songwriting credits ==
Year	Artist	Album	Song	Co-written with	Ref.
2019	Injury Reserve, Aminé	Injury Reserve	"Jailbreak the Tesla"	Injury Reserve, Aminé, Dylan Brady & William Corey	
2020	ihatenoe	Three Yerbas In a Day	"Linear Equation"	Noe Vazquez	
2026	Nine Inch Noize	Nine Inch Noize	"She's Gone Away (Nine Inch Noize Version)"	Trent Reznor, Atticus Ross & Alexander Ridha	

== Music videos ==
=== As lead artist ===
List of music videos as lead artist showing year released
Title	Year
"iCarly"	2016
"What U Mean Remix (Gay)"	2016
"Dennis Rodman"	2016
"Choppa In The Trunk"	2016
"Hey Arnold"	2016
"Glo Bottles"	2017
"Block List"	2017
"Poppin'"	2017
"Beat My Face (The Race Remix)"	2017
"Watch Me"	2017
"Key Lime OG"	2017
"Spaceships"	2017
"Rojo"	2017
"Smack A Bitch"	2018
"Trust Issues"	2018
"Hit That"	2018
"Rage"	2018
"Pressing Me"	2018
"Guap (LaLaLa)"	2018
"Roof"	2019
"Fashion Week"	2019
"Hard"	2019
"Lightning"	2020
"Popstar"	2020
"iPhone"	2020
"Own It"	2020
"OHFR?"	2020

=== As featured artist ===
List of music videos as featured artist showing year released
Title	Year
"No Reason" (Yunggtez featuring Big Tee and Rico Nasty)	2016
"Another Jugg" (JayChris featuring Rico Nasty)	2017
"BestFriend" (Champagne Dame featuring Rico Nasty)	2017
"Amigos" (Asian Doll featuring Rico Nasty)	2017
"Party" (London Dior featuring Rico Nasty)	2017
"Pimpin" (GL Ralph featuring Rico Nasty)	2017
"Legit" (Krystle Maria featuring Rico Nasty)	2018
"Barbie" (Big Mechoo featuring Rico Nasty)	2018
"Jawbreaker" (Injury Reserve featuring Rico Nasty and Pro Teens)	2019
"Tia Tamera" (Doja Cat featuring Rico Nasty)	2019
"Gucci Down (Remix)" (Xanman featuring Rico Nasty and YungManny)	2019
"FMU" (Brooke Candy featuring Rico Nasty)	2019
"Stomp and Grind" (Grandma featuring Rico Nasty)	2019
"Psycho (Remix)" (Jucee Froot featuring Rico Nasty)	2020
"Girl Crush" (Boys Noize featuring Rico Nasty)	2020
"Aquí Yo Mando" (Kali Uchis featuring Rico Nasty)	2020
"LiLBiTcH" (ChillPill featuring Rico Nasty and Soleima)	2021
"Jealous" (Mahalia featuring Rico Nasty)	2021

=== Guest appearances ===
List of music videos with cameo appearances, showing year released and artists
Year	Title	Artist(s)	Ref.
2019	"Old Town Road"	Lil Nas X & Billy Ray Cyrus	
2019	"Hot Girl Summer"	Megan Thee Stallion ft. Nicki Minaj and Ty Dolla Sign	
2019	"Bottom Bitch"	Doja Cat	
