= Nightmare Vacation =

Nightmare Vacation may refer to:

- Nightmare Vacation (album), 2020 album by American rapper Rico Nasty
- Sleepaway Camp, 1983 slasher film released in the UK as Nightmare Vacation
  - Sleepaway Camp II: Unhappy Campers, the 1988 sequel released in the UK as Nightmare Vacation II
  - Sleepaway Camp III: Teenage Wasteland, the 1989 sequel released in the UK as Nightmare Vacation III
- Nightmare Vacation, a 2017 horror film directed by Mark Polonia (not connected, or to be confused with the Sleepaway Camp franchise).
