= Lil Mariko (EP) =

2021 EP by Lil Mariko

EP by Lil Mariko
- Released: March 18, 2021
- Genres: Hyperpop; trap metal
- Length: 16:24
- Label: Self-released
- Producer: Jared Soule

Singles from Lil Mariko
- 1. "Don't Touch (feat. Full Tac)" Released: April 18, 2020; 2. "Shiny (feat. Full Tac)" Released: September 4, 2020

Lil Mariko is the debut EP by American singer Lil Mariko, independently released on March 18, 2021. It was produced by Mariko's boyfriend and creative partner Jared Soule, otherwise known as Full Tac.

== Background and promotion ==
The first single that would later be compiled in the EP was "Don't Touch" featuring Full Tac, released on April 21, 2020. The second, "Shiny" also featuring Full Tac was released on September 4, 2020. A music video followed on March 20, 2021, two days after the EP's release.

On April 3, Lil Mariko performed for Chester Lockhart's Chester's Bday Party live-streamed event alongside Full Tac. The event also encouraged donations to The Okra Project and Red Canary Song.

== Composition and writing ==
The main genres of Lil Mariko are hyperpop and trap metal.

The first track on the EP, "Hi, I'm a Slut" conveys sex positivity as a reclamation and response to "slut-shaming". It features heavy bass and electronic synths taking elements from both trap and pop. The track was also loosely compared to 100 gecs, Doja Cat, and Babymetal. The second track, "Don't Touch" featuring Full Tac, alternates between synth-filled choruses and Mariko's screams. Lyrically, the track describes Lil Mariko's disdain for men who sexually harass women or stare at them for too long. Mariko's character fully portrays a personality set on spontaneous violence. "100 Dicks" criticized men who send unsolicited dick pics to women. The track follows the standard hyperpop flow. The next track, "I'm Baby" contains some minor influences from deathcore. Mainly the fact that has a heavier sound than its predecessors, and features increasingly guttural vocals. The track "Disgusting" features guest vocals from Zheani. The sixth track, "Shiny" also featuring Full Tac was described in a similar vain to the previous. Being a sex positive, gender equalizing track full of energy. Closing track "Catboys" is a fantasied ode to pegging Catboys. Mariko commented that she wanted to combine something like catboys and drill music.

== Critical reception ==
Professional ratings
Review scores
Source	Rating
The Globe	4/5
ComUM	6/10
SputnikMusic	3.7
TuneChamber.com	3/5

The EP received mixed reviews from critics, who praised Mariko's vocal performance and production, but criticism aimed at some tracks not living up to the hype as the full project intended to be. The Cascade praised many of the tracks on the EP, however noted that "I'm Baby" and "Catboys" fell short of the hype. The student newspaper The Globe gave the EP a positive 4-out-of-5 rating. Afonso Marques of the Portuguese University of Minho's online student journal ComUM gave it a rating of 6-out-of-10, although positive, the tracks "100 Dicks" and "Disgusting" were seen as the EP's weaknesses. A review from Working Class Whole also positively rated the EP, noting that "Lil Mariko juxtaposes her cutesy, saccharine singing with monstrous metal screaming in a way that makes sense and does not feel out of place or too unexpected." and recommended the EP for both fans of pop and metal. Bradley Timm of TuneChamber.com gave a positive review and cited "Lil Mariko's tracks lack in substance are made up for in legitimately catchy – if sporadically abrasive – productions." and hoped her next release would improve of her flaws.

== Track listing ==
Track listing adapted from Spotify.

No.	Title	Writer(s)	Length
1.	"Hi, I'm a Slut"	Jared Soule, Katherine Mariko Zhang	2:50
2.	"Don't Touch" (featuring Full Tac)	Soule, Zhang	2:28
3.	"100 Dicks"	Soule, Zhang	1:52
4.	"I'm Baby"	Soule, Zhang, Russ Chell	1:58
5.	"Disgusting" (featuring Zheani)	Soule, Zhang, Zheani Sparkes	2:36
6.	"Shiny" (featuring Full Tac)	Soule, Zhang	2:07
7.	"Catboys"	Soule, Zhang	2:31
Total length:			16:24

== Personnel ==
=== Performance ===
- Lil Mariko – vocals
- Full Tac – guest (track 2, 6)
- Zheani – guest vocals (track 5)

=== Production ===
- Full Tac – producer, mixing, mastering, engineering
- Russ Chell – additional production (track 4)
