= Full Tac =

American musical artist (born 1989)

- Birth name: Jared Taylor Soule
- Origin: New York City, U.S.
- Years active: 2012–present

Jared Taylor Soule (born February 1, 1989), known professionally as Full Tac, is an American music producer, director, actor, artist, and internet personality. Soule and his girlfriend and creative partner Lil Mariko (Katherine Mariko Zhang) went viral after releasing a music video for the single "Where's my Juul??" in December 2019. Soule has also worked with Dorian Electra, and rappers BigKlit and Rico Nasty among other artists.

== Personal life ==
Soule lives in Ridgewood, Queens.

== Career ==
Soule has directed, produced, and edited several music videos with 24 credits on The Internet Music Video Database. He worked with the production company Ricky Shabazz and the Boom Bap Boys on several music video projects in 2012. In December 2019, Soule released "Where's My Juul" with Lil Mariko, which quickly racked up half a million views by January. The video currently has 20 million views.
