= Lil Mariko =

American rapper (born 1996)

- Born: Katherine Mariko Zhang; March 1, 1996 (age 30)
- Origin: New York City, U.S.
- Genres: Hip-hop; trap metal; screamo; hyperpop
- Occupations: Rapper, songwriter, singer
- Years active: 2019–present
- Label: Tactical Music • Four Loko
- Website: katmzhang.com

Katherine Mariko Zhang (born March 1, 1996), known professionally as Lil Mariko, is an American rapper. Her first single "Where's My Juul??" released in 2019 was her collaboration with her producer boyfriend Jared Soule (known professionally as Full Tac). It became a viral internet hit with over 23 million views across YouTube and Spotify. Her debut self-titled EP, Lil Mariko was released in 2021.

== Early life ==
Katherine Mariko Zhang was born in 1996 to a Chinese father and a Japanese mother. Her family lived in Taipei before relocating to Houston, Texas, where she would spend most of her childhood. Zhang played violin in middle school and graduated high school in 2014. As a child, Zhang and her family moved frequently because of her father's work but continued to return to Houston.

== Career ==
=== 2019–2021: Initial success and Lil Mariko ===
The collaborative single "Where's My Juul??" was freestyled by Lil Mariko as a joke in August 2019 using a beat made by Full Tac. The track benefited from Zhang's heavy metal past and love of 1990s rave music. Guitarist Russ Chell provides the metal riff on the track. Despite being made as a joke, Zhang took serious influence from Mindless Self Indulgence and The Prodigy. The music video for the track was released on December 18. Lil Mariko's vocals were also likened to Poppy. The single was thematically compared to the 2006 viral hit Shoes by Liam Kyle Sullivan. It would later reach a wider audience through the video sharing social media service TikTok, becoming a trend where users would lip sync to the song before transforming into creepy characters after the breakdown. The trend was comparatively similar to the clown check trend where users would do the same but to Insane Clown Posse songs instead. The music video for "Where's My Juul??" was also temporarily removed from YouTube after receiving a copyright claim from Stevie Emerson, also known as Slappers Only on YouTube, disputing the use of the phrase "where's my Juul?" but was later reinstated.

The couple's next single was "Don't Touch" which received similar viral acclaim, released on April 20, 2020. Later followed by a remix of Dorian Electra's track "Sorry Bro (I Love You)" on June 22 with a music video later uploaded on June 26. Their third release of 2020, "Shiny" was released on September 3 with its music video uploaded on March 20, 2021. Lil Mariko featured on Dorian Electra's album My Agenda on the track "Ram It Down" also featuring vocals from Mood Killer and Lil Texas. "Ram It Down" was described as hyperpop with a distinct metal flair. Lil Mariko and Full Tac performed together during Dorian Electra's My Agenda Online Twitch stream on October 24, a fundraising event for Black Trans Femmes in the Arts.

Lil Mariko's self-titled debut EP was released on March 18, 2021, and featured her previous singles "Don't Touch" and "Shiny". The track "Disgusting" featured guest vocals from Zheani. The EP received a positive 4 out of 5 review by the student newspaper The Globe. On April 3, Lil Mariko performed for Chester Lockhart's Chester's Bday Party live-streamed event. The event also encouraged donations to The Okra Project and Red Canary Song.

=== 2021–present: Upcoming studio album ===
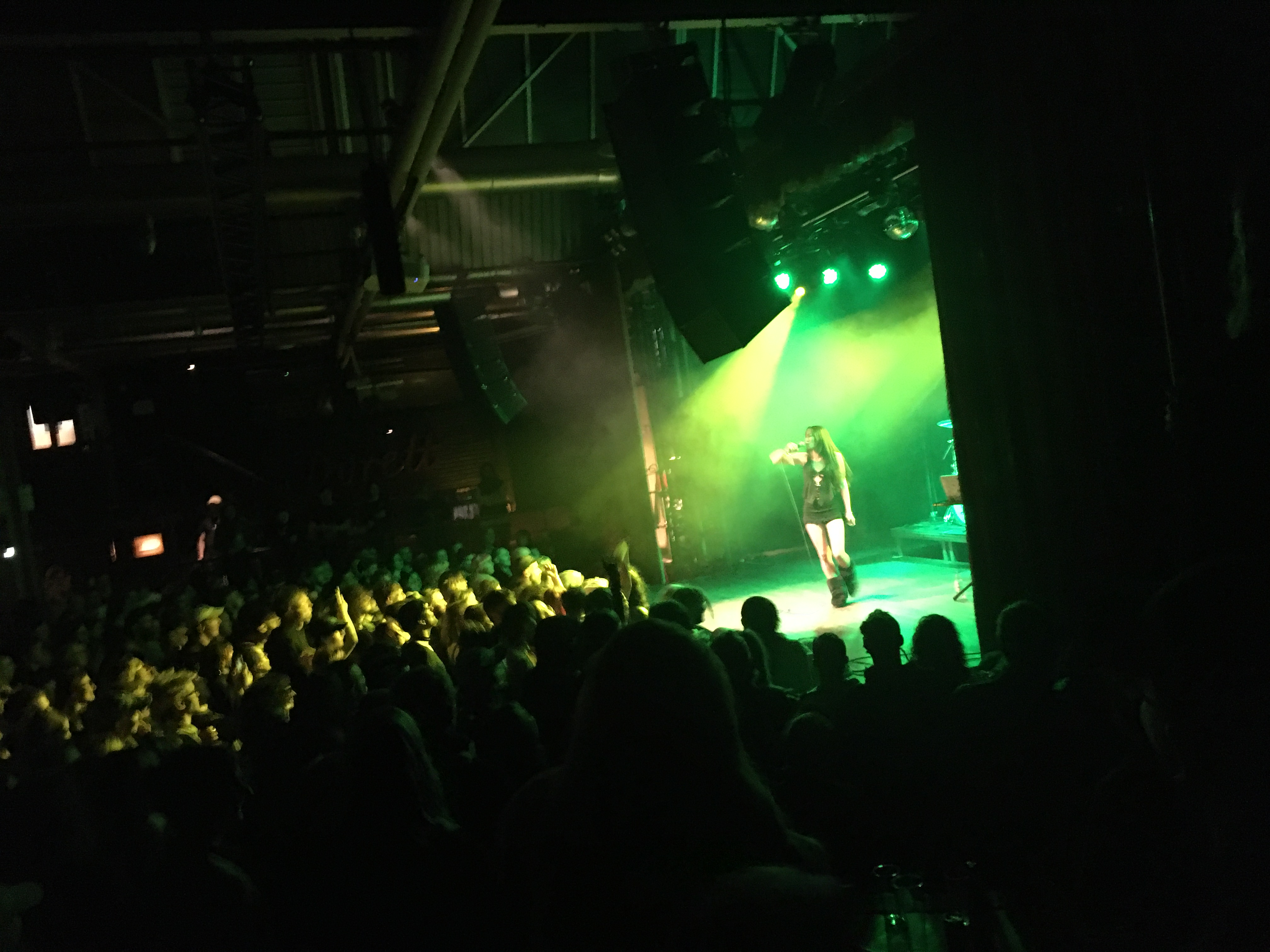
Lil Mariko performing at the CTM Festival. February 2023, Berlin.

On May 1, Lil Mariko collaborated with Full Tac and Rico Nasty on a new single "Simp". The single was produced by Full Tac like usual, but with additional production from Russ Chell. Mariko's friend Sebastian Bidegain was featured in the music video dressed in a full gimp suit. On July 16, Lil Mariko released a new single "Boring" featuring Full Tac. The single was released under the new record label created by Four Loko. A music video accompanied the single's release. On the same day, Lil Mariko also appeared on Recovery Girl's mixtape Recovery Girl & Friends on the track "Feels So Good" featuring the additional vocal talent of Diana Starshine, GFOTY, and Space Candy. In August, Lil Mariko announced her plan to relocate to Los Angeles to record her debut studio album. Mariko also revealed that more collaborative singles were to be released in the near future also.

In February 2022, Lil Mariko made her live concert debut, supporting Dorian Electra on their US tour.

A year later, she would make her international debut performing at the 2023 CTM Festival in Berlin, Germany. Following this, she appeared live performing at Belgrave Music Hall in Leeds as part of a European and UK tour. On 25 September, Lil Mariko appeared in Doja Cat's music video "Agora Hills".

On January 29, 2025, Lil Mariko performed for the LA Gives Back Fire Relief concert to help raise funds to help those affected by the then-recent wildfires.

== Personal life ==
Zhang attended Pratt Institute School of Art in 2015 and later graduated in 2018. Zhang lives in Flatbush, Brooklyn and has been dating producer boyfriend Jared Soule, also known as Full Tac, since 2018. Zhang recalls their meeting as Soule direct-messaging her on Instagram after she followed him and asked her to model for him. After initially getting along well, they ended up dating shortly afterward. Zhang is also an avid vaper, and states her favorite flavor is cucumber. Zhang's artistic talent includes; drawing, photography, sketches and sculpting.

Zhang revealed that she suffers from social anxiety and the idea of live performances frightens her but she is not completely opposed to it, theorizing she would get over the initial shock once she was actually on stage, which eventually proved true after touring since 2022.

== Discography ==
=== Extended plays ===
List of extended plays
Title	Album details
Lil Mariko	Released: March 18, 2021; Label: Self-released; Format: Digital download, streaming, LP
Slightly Unhinged	Released: April 2, 2026; Label: Self-released; Format: Digital download, streaming

=== Singles ===
==== As lead artist ====
Title	Year	Album
"Don't Touch" (featuring Full Tac)	2020	Lil Mariko
"Shiny" (featuring Full Tac)	2020	Lil Mariko
"Simp" (with Full Tac and Rico Nasty)	2021	non-album singles
"Boring" (featuring Full Tac)	2021	non-album singles

==== As featured artist ====
Title	Year	Album
"Where's My Juul??" (Full Tac featuring Lil Mariko)	2019	Non-album single

==== Other appearances ====
List of non-single appearances
Title	Year	Artist(s)	Album
"Ram It Down"	2020	Dorian Electra (featuring Mood Killer, Lil Mariko, Lil Texas)	My Agenda
"Feels So Good"	2021	Recovery Girl (featuring Diana Starshine, GFOTY, Lil Mariko, Space Candy)	Recovery Girl & Friends

=== Remixes ===
List of official remixes, with year released and original artist(s) shown
Title	Year	Artist(s)
"Sorry Bro (I Love You)" (with Full Tac)	2020	Dorian Electra

=== Music videos ===
Song	Year	Director
"Where's My Juul??"	2019	Jared Soule
"Sorry Bro (I Love You)" (Lil Mariko & Full Tac Remix)	2020	Jared Soule
"KK Metal" (K.K. Slider cover)	2020	Jared Soule
"Shiny"	2021	Jared Soule
"Simp"	2021	Jared Soule
"Boring"	2021	Jared Soule
"Hi, I'm a Slut" (featuring ppcocaine) [Full Tac Remix]	2023	Alicia Afshar
"NPC"	2026	Team Rolfes
