= Love Me as I Am (Nino Paid album) =

Studio album by Nino Paid
- Released: February 4, 2025
- Genre: Rap
- Length: 35:48
- Labels: Signal; Columbia

Nino Paid chronology
Can't Go Bacc (2024)	Love Me as I Am (2025)

Singles from Love Me as I Am
- 1. "Play This At My Funeral" Released: November 4, 2024; 2. "Tyreek Hill" Released: November 21, 2024; 3. "Cooln" Released: December 11, 2024; 4. "Joey Story" Released: January 22, 2025

Love Me as I Am is the second studio album by American rapper Nino Paid, released on February 4, 2025. The 18-track project features appearances from Tommy Richman, XanMan, and PlaqueBoyMax, among others. Jude Noel of Pitchfork rated the project a 7.9 out of 10, while Jordan Darville of The FADER praised Nino Paid's storytelling abilities. In December 2025, Love Me as I Am was ranked 24 out of 40 best rap albums by HotNewHipHop.

== Background ==
Love Me as I Am is Nino Paid's second full-length album, in which he confronts his personal struggles, using emo-influenced production and elements commonly used in pain rap. Following the release of Can't Go Bacc in 2024, Paid sought to create a more introspective project. Speaking with Uproxx, Nino Paid noted that the album captures "everything I been through."

Love Me as I Am is an album that explores the themes of personal struggle, loss, and introspection, such as the suicide of a friend and questions of morality.

== Critical reception ==
Professional ratings
Review scores
Source	Rating
Pitchfork	7.9/10

Writing for Pitchfork, Jude Noel gave Love Me as I Am a rating of 7.9 out of 10. Jordan Darville of The FADER viewed the project as a continuation of Nino Paid's work on pain and introspection. HotNewHipHop ranked Love Me as I Am 24 of 40 best rap albums of 2025. Complex listed the album 22 of 35 best hip-hop albums of 2025.

== Track listing ==
All tracks are written by Jacquan Andrews.

No.	Title	Writer(s)	Length
1.	"Something To Live For"	Jacquan Andrews; Tyree White	2:18
2.	"Redemption"	Jacquan Andrews; Dustin Martin; Aaronn Mackins; Arick Mackins; Mesheck Haughton	1:57
3.	"Tears In The Hotbox" (featuring Jripey)	Jacquan Andrews; Joshua Bein-Aime; Parris St Pete Daniel Norris; Wayne Symington	2:28
4.	"Be Safe"	Jacquan Andrews; Keiran Murphy	1:50
5.	"Tyreek Hill"	Jacquan Andrews; Cameron Choi; Yadav Singh	1:30
6.	"Try Me" (featuring Tommy Richman)	Jacquan Andrews; Curtis Waters; Emmanuel Arah; Chidozie Arah; Ji Hwan Chun	1:59
7.	"Weekend in Paris" (featuring XanMan)	Jacquan Andrews; Halie Salaam; Vince Patilla; Samuel Bergeron Belton; Essej Jeanpierre	2:23
8.	"Bad Day"	Jacquan Andrews; Cyrus Gomez	1:48
9.	"Progress Report"	Jacquan Andrews; Brandon Le; Carl Fuertes-Nitura	2:42
10.	"30 Seconds Left"	Jacquan Andrews; Dennis Kindred; Aaronn Mackins; Arick Mackins	0:39
11.	"Boy Meets World"	Jacquan Andrews; Julian Cruz; Lauren Jazang; Maria Landi; Mark Landon	1:54
12.	"Joey Story"	Jacquan Andrews; Cameron Choi; Konstantin Pepelov; Tre Webb	2:09
13.	"Give Me a Beat"	Jacquan Andrews; Tyree White	2:01
14.	"Love Me As I Am"	Jacquan Andrews; Julian Cruz	1:55
15.	"Play This At My Funeral"	Jacquan Andrews; Jorden Bundy; Julio Moreno; Charles Forsberg	2:08
16.	"Ten More Seconds" (featuring FCG Heem)	Jacquan Andrews; Rowan Kemble; Raheem Rutty; Julio Moreno	2:18
17.	"What If We Made It"	Jacquan Andrews; Cameron Choi; Cameron O'Brien; Roshan Chambless Nandkumar	1:48
18.	"Cooln" (featuring Babycheifdoit & PlaqueBoyMax)	Jacquan Andrews; Jayden Whittier-Jones; Jordan Church; Austin Giwa; Semaj Nelson; Jonah Anderson; Maxwell Dent	1:50
Total length:			35:48
