= Goonew =

American rapper (1997–2022)

- Morrow c. 2017

Background information
- Also known as: Goonrich, Goonwick, Wick, Big 64, The Biggest Goon
- Born: Markelle Antonio Morrow; May 14, 1997; Forestville, Maryland, U.S
- Died: March 18, 2022 (aged 24) District Heights, Maryland, U.S
- Genres: Hip hop; trap; drill
- Occupation: Rapper
- Years active: 2017–2022
- Label: MPR (Mony Powr RSpt)

Markelle Antonio Morrow (May 14, 1997 - March 18, 2022), professionally known as Goonew, was an American rapper from Maryland.

Rising to prominence in the DMV rap scene, Morrow gained attention for his whisper flow style and lyricism. His music often explored themes of street life, indulging in street narcotics, and the challenges of urban environments. Morrow's career was marked by collaborations with artists including Lil Yachty, Hoodrich Pablo Juan, Xanman, ASAP Ant. The release of several mixtapes garnered him a growing fan base.

Morrow died on March 18, 2022, from a gunshot wound. His family, friends and fans held a memorial at a nightclub where his corpse was propped up on stage dressed in designer clothing.

== Early life and career ==
Markelle Antonio Morrow was born on May 14, 1997, in Forestville, Maryland. He began rapping in 2017 when he was inspired by a friend and rapper, Big Flock.

Morrow began releasing his music onto platforms the same year he began rapping. Throughout his career, he released several projects, such as Certified Goon, Beware Of Goon, Big 64, Goonrich Urkel, Goonwick 2, Back From Hell, Homixide Boyz 2, Still Servin, and Short Temper.

== Death and memorial ==
On March 18, 2022, Morrow was fatally shot in a parking lot at approximately 5:40 PM on Walters Lane at District Heights in Prince George's County, Maryland. He was pronounced dead at the Prince George's County hospital at 7:30 PM. He died at the age of 24. Following his death, a $25,000 reward for finding the shooter was released to the public.

Following his death, fans of Morrow, his family, and other rappers and friends showcased their condolences to the rapper, with some notable names being YungManny, IDK, and Cordae, amongst others.

To honor Morrow's success and career, his family, friends, and fans held a memorial at a nightclub where his corpse was propped up on stage dressed in designer clothing.

== Musical style and artistry ==
Morrow was a member of the DMV rap scene. He was known for his whisper rap flow, which had been positively received amongst music reviewers and fans prior to his passing.

== Discography ==
=== Studio albums and mixtapes ===
Title	Album details
Certified Goon	Released: August 22, 2017; Label: Independent; Format: Digital download, streaming
Beware of Goon	Released:November 14, 2017; Label: Independent; Format: Digital download, streaming
Homicide Boyz	Released: January 1, 2018; Label: Independent; Format: Digital download, streaming
Goonwick	Released: February 9, 2018; Label: Independent; Format: Digital download, streaming
Big 64	Released: July 10, 2018; Label: Independent; Format: Digital download, streaming
Goonrich Urkel	Released: October 31, 2018; Label: Independent; Format: Digital download, streaming
Goonwick 2	Released: March 13, 2020; Label: Independent; Format: Digital download, streaming
Homicide Boyz 2	Released: August 22, 2018; Label: Independent; Format: Digital Download, Streaming
Still Servin (album)	Released: February 28, 2019; Label: Independent; Format: Digital Download, Streaming
Back From Hell	Released: October 1, 2019; Label: Independent; Format: Digital Download, Streaming
Big64 2	Released: June 19, 2020; Label: Independent; Format: Digital Download, Streaming
Short Temper	Released: March 26, 2021; Label: Independent; Format: Digital Download, Streaming

== See also ==
- List of murdered hip-hop musicians
