= Nightmare Vacation (album) =

Studio album by Rico Nasty
- Released: December 4, 2020
- Recorded: 2018–2019
- Genres: Hip hop; punk rap; nu-metal; hyperpop; trap; R&B
- Length: 39:30
- Labels: APG; Atlantic; Sugar Trap
- Producers: 100 gecs; Alter Ego; Avedon; Buddah Bless; Bunx Dadda; Camden; CashMoneyAP; Dylan Brady; F1LTHY; Brandon Finnesin; Jasiah; Tay Keith; Kenny Beats; B. Lewis; Seeley; Al B. Smoove; Take a Daytrip; Dez Wright

Rico Nasty chronology
Anger Management (2019)	Nightmare Vacation (2020)	Las Ruinas (2022)

Singles from Nightmare Vacation
- 1. "iPhone" Released: August 13, 2020; 2. "Own It" Released: September 17, 2020; 3. "Don't Like Me" Released: October 22, 2020; 4. "OHFR?" Released: November 10, 2020; 5. "STFU" Released: December 4, 2020

Nightmare Vacation is the debut studio album by American rapper Rico Nasty, released on December 4, 2020, through Artist Partner Group (APG), Atlantic Records and her own Sugar Trap label. The album features guest appearances from rappers Trippie Redd, Aminé, Gucci Mane and Don Toliver, among others. Frequent producers on the record also include 100 gecs, Take a Daytrip and Avedon, with additional work from producers such as Tay Keith, Buddah Bless and CashMoneyAP.

The album earned positive reviews, with many of the music critics complimenting its ferocity, fun and genre integration, including trap metal as well as Rico Nasty's delivery and empowering lyrics. It was supported by the singles "iPhone", "Own It", "Don't Like Me", "OHFR?" and "STFU" and also features her breakout 2018 single "Smack a Bitch" which had been certified gold by the Recording Industry Association of America earlier that year.

== Background and recording ==
Rico Nasty first revealed the title Nightmare Vacation to Coveteur in September 2019, without distinguishing whether it would be a mixtape or an album. In October 2019, she told Complex that the album was supposed to be released in that year but she held it off "because of factors that she doesn't explicitly divulge." Instead, she released the collaborative mixtape Anger Management (2019) with Kenny Beats, as well as a string of several non-album singles to "hold fans over". Talking to NME about the time spent during her creative process and the self-doubt it causes, Rico Nasty said, "I made Anger Management in a week. I made Nasty (2018) and Sugar Trap (2017) in around three months. I made Tales of Tacobella (2017) in a month [...] I made this album [Nightmare Vacation] in a year. I hope that I'm not one of the people that overperfected it and took away what [the fans] enjoyed."

External videos
- Nightmare Vacation (Official Trailer), via YouTube

Rico Nasty formally announced the album on August 13, 2020, alongside the release of its lead single, "iPhone". She subsequently released a makeup palette as a collaboration with Il Makiage, and later confirmed that names of the shades will be titles of the tracks in the album. In a letter directed to her fans, Rico Nasty explained that the project's title is a metaphorical oxymoron: "[...] understand that anything you want you can achieve! But know that there will be good and bad with everything. That's why this album is called Nightmare Vacation. Sometimes the things you want aren't the things you need." In September 2020, Rico Nasty revealed that the album was prepared for imminent release. She told Complex that it would be released in the Halloween season, which Los Angeles Times later confirmed as October 30, 2020, in a write-up. However, in early November 2020, Rico Nasty only formally announced the official release date of December 4, 2020. The album cover was also revealed with this announcement. Rico Nasty would also later release a visual cinematic trailer to build hype for the album, before revealing the album's tracklist in early December.

== Composition ==
Nightmare Vacation is a hip hop album influenced by a variety of musical elements such as trap, nu-metal, punk and punk rap, emo, bubblegum pop, hyperpop, R&B, and electronic. Musically, Kyann-Sian Williams of NME described the album simply as "sugar trap [genre] on steroids".

Rico Nasty herself described the album as "a more evolved version of Sugar Trap [2016 mixtape], because it's good and bad", and noted that unlike most of her existing repertoire, "there are no rock cadences on it. It's a vibe. It makes you feel good, makes you feel happy." On the concept behind the album and its musical presence, she said: "Nightmare Vacation is your best and worst experience. In my case, it's music. [...] Nightmare Vacation is playing on those super aggressive sounds, along with these super melodic shapes." Rico Nasty told Dazed that the album "is not based on one aesthetic" and that the album features "another voice" she has developed which is neither rap or rock. She continued: "it sounds natural. It's really fire. I'm happy that I locked myself in the studio and didn't give up on life."

== Release and promotion ==
=== Singles ===
On August 13, 2020, Rico Nasty released "iPhone" as the album's lead single, alongside its own music video. The second single "Own It" was also paired with a music video, released September 17, 2020. The third single "Don't Like Me" was released October 22, 2020. The fourth single "OHFR?" was released November 11, 2020, alongside a music video. The release of the music video for the fifth single "STFU" coincided with the release of the album on December 4, 2020.

=== Other songs ===
The song "Smack a Bitch" was released on January 13, 2018, and became Rico Nasty's "breakout single", before featuring as a bonus track on Nightmare Vacation two years later. A remix of the song featuring American rappers ppcocaine, Rubi Rose and Sukihana serves as the last track on the album.

=== Live performances ===
Rico Nasty made her television debut when she performed "OHFR?" on The Tonight Show Starring Jimmy Fallon in January 2021.

== Critical reception ==
Professional ratings
Aggregate scores
Source	Rating
AnyDecentMusic?	7.2/10
Metacritic	80/100
Review scores
Source	Rating
Clash	8.0/10
DIY	4.5/5 stars
Entertainment Weekly	B+
The Guardian	3/5 stars
The Line of Best Fit	8.5/10
NME	4/5 stars
The Observer	3/5 stars
Paste	8.4/10
Pitchfork	7.4/10
Slate	4/5 stars

According to the review aggregator Metacritic, Nightmare Vacation received "generally favorable reviews" based on a weighted average score of 80 out of 100 from 12 critic scores. Aggregator AnyDecentMusic? gave it 7.2 out of 10, based on their assessment of the critical consensus.

Dominic Haley of Loud and Quiet described Nightmare Vacation as "short, aggressive and about as in-your-face as a Slipknot record" which "leaves you with the feeling that it could be the record that will finally cement Nasty as one of the most essential, vital voices in rap's current pantheon." Candace McDuffie of Paste wrote that Rico Nasty "juggles ferocity and fun" on the record, and wrote that her "inaugural efforts are cathartic, ballsy and just plain fun. Nightmare Vacation solidifies the emcee as quite the furious force to be reckoned with." Writing for Clash, Robert Kazandjian also described the album as "combative, empowering and unashamedly fun". Critics from both The Guardian and The Line of Best Fit agreed that the album was her "most raging" and "nastiest" release yet. Kyann-Sian Williams of NME wrote that as Rico Nasty channels "nostalgic noughties culture and sound while exuding turbulent modern production", her debut studio album "solidifies her status as a singular talent". Elly Watson of DIY concluded with the statement: "Biting and abrasive in the best kind of ways, Nightmare Vacation finds an artist stepping up into the hype that's been surrounding her for years, and delivering on it tenfold. It will chew you up and spit you out, and you'll love every minute of it."

Critics from The Observer and The Guardian wrote slightly less positive reviews, both expressing how Rico Nasty's music, despite its uniqueness and freshness, had not stylistically experienced any progression from her existing repertoire but rather "stagnation".

=== Year-end lists ===
Select year-end rankings of Nightmare Vacation
Publication	List	Rank	Ref.
Uproxx	The Best Albums Of 2021	—N/a	

== Commercial performance ==
On Spotify in the first two days after its release, Nightmare Vacation was the second most streamed album debut in the United States, and the tenth most streamed album debut worldwide. Due to its moderate success, it topped the Heatseekers Albums chart.

== Track listing ==
Nightmare Vacation track listing
No.	Title	Writer(s)	Producer(s)	Length
1.	"Candy"	Maria-Cecilia Simone Kelly; Bradford Lewis; Malik Foxx Parker	B. Lewis	2:38
2.	"Don't Like Me" (featuring Gucci Mane and Don Toliver)	Kelly; Radric Davis; Caleb Toliver; Tyron Douglas	Buddah Bless	2:45
3.	"Check Me Out"	Kelly; Malachi-Phree Jasiah Pate; Parker	Jasiah	1:43
4.	"iPhone"	Kelly; Dylan Brady	Brady	2:38
5.	"STFU"	Kelly; David Biral; Denzel Baptiste; Parker	Take a Daytrip	2:16
6.	"Back and Forth" (featuring Aminé)	Kelly; Adam Aminé Daniel; Alex Petit; Dylan Cleary-Krell	CashMoneyAP; Dez Wright	3:01
7.	"Girl Scouts"	Kelly; Biral; Baptiste	Take a Daytrip	2:41
8.	"Let It Out"	Kelly; Brady; Laura Les; Parker	100 gecs	2:28
9.	"Loser" (featuring Trippie Redd)	Kelly; Nick Seeley; Brandon Veal; Parker	Brandon Finnesin; Seeley	2:25
10.	"No Debate"	Kelly; Jason Fleming; Parker	Bunx Dadda	2:13
11.	"Pussy Poppin"	Kelly; Brady; Les; Parker	100 gecs	1:56
12.	"OHFR?"	Kelly; Brady	Brady	2:00
13.	"10Fo"	Kelly; Alec Tolkin; Richard Ortiz; Parker	F1LTHY; Al B. Smoove	2:42
14.	"Own It"	Kelly; Vincent van den Ende; Camden Bench; Amit Nagra	Avedon; Camden; Alter Ego	2:09
15.	"Smack a Bitch (Remix)" (featuring ppcocaine, Sukihana and Rubi Rose)	Kelly; Lilliane Diomi; Destiny Henderson; Kenneth Blume III	Kenny Beats	3:37
16.	"Smack a Bitch" (bonus)	Kelly; Blume	Kenny Beats	2:18
Total length:				39:30

== Personnel ==
Musicians

- Rico Nasty – vocals
- B. Lewis – programming (1)
- Buddah Bless – programming (2)
- Dylan Brady – programming (4, 12)
- Take a Daytrip – programming (5, 7)
- Aminé – vocals (6)
- Nick Seeley – electric guitar, synthesizer (9)
- 100 gecs – programming (11)
- Alter Ego – programming (14)
- Avedon – programming (14)
- Camden – programming (14)

Technical

- Chris Athens – mastering
- Joe Fitz – mixing (1, 3–5, 7–11, 13–16)
- Jaycen Joshua – mixing (2)
- David Nakaji – mixing (6)
- Joshua "Jay Que" Queen – engineering (1, 10)
- Dylan Brady – engineering (4)
- Take a Daytrip – engineering (5)
- Paul Bailey – engineering (8, 11–13)
- Juan Fleischer – engineering (9), engineering assistance (4, 15, 16)
- Alex Toval – engineering (15, 16)
- Samantha Kossoff – mixing assistance (1, 3–5, 7–11, 13, 14)
- DJ Riggins – mixing assistance (2)
- Jacob Richards – mixing assistance (2)
- Mike Seaberg – mixing assistance (2)

== Charts ==
Chart performance for Nightmare Vacation
Chart (2020)	Peak position
US Heatseekers Albums (Billboard)	1
