= Smack a Bitch =

Single by Rico Nasty

from the album Nightmare Vacation
- Released: January 13, 2018
- Genre: Punk rap; rap rock
- Length: 2:19
- Label: Atlantic; Sugar Trap
- Songwriters: Kelly; Lilliane Diomi; Destiny Henderson; Kenneth Blume III
- Producer: Kenny Beats

Music video
- "Smack a Bitch" on YouTube

"Smack a Bitch" is a song by American rapper and singer Rico Nasty. Her breakout song, it was later included on her debut studio album Nightmare Vacation (2020) as a bonus track, in addition to a remix one track prior featuring ppcocaine, Sukihana, and Rubi Rose.

== Certifications ==
Region	Certification	Certified units/sales
United States (RIAA)	Platinum	1,000,000^{‡}
^{‡} Sales+streaming figures based on certification alone.
