= Teethsucker (Yea3x) =

2025 single by Rico Nasty

Single by Rico Nasty

from the album Lethal
- Released: February 20, 2025
- Genre: Rap rock; electropunk
- Length: 2:19
- Label: Fueled by Ramen
- Songwriters: Rico Nasty; Imad Royal; Rayman on the Beat
- Producers: Royal; Rayman on the Beat

Rico Nasty singles chronology
"Arintintin (with Boys Noize)" (2024)	"Teethsucker (Yea3x)" (2025)	"On the Low" (2025)

Music video
- "Teethsucker (Yea3x)" on YouTube

"Teethsucker (Yea3x)" (stylized in caps as TEETHSUCKER (YEA3X)) is a song by American rapper and singer Rico Nasty. It is the first single, released on February 20, 2025, from her third studio album, Lethal.

== Background and release ==
"Teethsucker (Yea3x)" was released as the lead single from Lethal. The song's music video accompanied the album announcement on Pitchfork. Rico Nasty stated that the song was the first written for the album and marked her first collaboration with Imad Royal, who served as the album's executive producer. She described the song as a way to start a new era.

== Composition and style ==
Stereoboard described the track as striking a balance between rap and electro-rock, while Beats Per Minute called it a "distorted electro-punk banger." The song has been described as a heavy, riff-driven rap rock track, while Billboard called it a "rambunctious rock-rap" track. According to HotNewHipHop, the song features a guitar-driven instrumental with loud 808s, along with Rico Nasty's exaggerated vocal delivery, which the publication said evokes the feeling of a pop-punk act.

== Critical reception ==
The song received a positive response from HotNewHipHop, which described it as a strong introduction to Lethal. The reviewer described the lyrics as focusing on self-assertion, and wrote that they were effective because of Rico Nasty's charisma. Billboard wrote that Nasty effortlessly maneuvers the raucous soundscape by Rayman on the Beat and Royal, and suggested that this could be the moment the mainstream catches up with her.

== Personnel ==
Credits adapted from TIDAL

- Rico Nasty – vocals, songwriter
- Imad Royal – producer, songwriter, executive producer
- Rayman on the Beat – producer, songwriter
