= Don't Like Me =

2020 single by Rico Nasty featuring Gucci Mane and Don Toliver

Single by Rico Nasty featuring Gucci Mane and Don Toliver

from the album Nightmare Vacation
- Released: October 22, 2020
- Length: 2:45
- Label: Atlantic; Sugar Trap
- Songwriters: Maria Kelly; Radric Davis; Caleb Toliver; Tyron Douglas
- Producer: Buddah Bless

Rico Nasty singles chronology
"Own It" (2020)	"Don't Like Me" (2020)	"OHFR?" (2020)

Gucci Mane singles chronology
"Meeting" (2020)	"Don't Like Me" (2020)	"SoIcyBoyz 3" (2020)

Don Toliver singles chronology
"Lemonade" (2020)	"Don't Like Me" (2020)	"Mystery Lady" (2020)

"Don't Like Me" is a song by American rapper Rico Nasty featuring fellow American rappers Don Toliver and Gucci Mane. The song was produced by Buddah Bless, who also wrote the song along with the three artists. It was released on October 22, 2020, through Atlantic Records and Rico's own Sugar Trap label as the third single from her debut studio album, Nightmare Vacation.

== Background and recording ==
"Don't Like Me" served as the third single off of Nightmare Vacation and was preceded by "Own It" and "iPhone". Mastering for the track was handled by Chris Athens, while mixing was handled by Jaycen Joshua, with assistance from DJ Riggins, Jacob Richards and Mike Seaberg.

== Composition and lyrics ==
In terms of lyrics, the song was described as "a theme song for winners and those who have no problem bragging about their sexual prowess." Aaron Williams of Uproxx noted that the three lyrically "explain all the reasons their haters can't seem to find it in their hearts to let go", while "Toliver holds down the hook and Gucci provides his own verse running down all the reasons they have to flex." Rico Nasty and Don Toliver both repeat the chorus from two different perspectives, while name-dropping Gucci Mane in the hook. Gucci later takes over and performs his verse before the former two each repeat the hook once again and the song ends. The song is in the key of E Minor at a fast-paced (146 BPM) beat.

== Critical reception ==
Chris DeVille of Stereogum described the song as "a woozy computerized banger that blurs the line between rap and experimental pop". Jon Blistein of Rolling Stone wrote that it "boasts an ebullient beat with soft synth plunks shimmering atop booming bass and crisp drums". Blistein also described the chorus as "instantly memorable" and Toliver's verse as "delightful". Jackson Langford of NME also noted that Rico "deliver[ed] a more relaxed and understated performance than she's given throughout the year." Sajae Elder of The Fader praised the production, writing that "the soft synths and booming bassline act as the perfect backdrop for Rico and Toliver's catchy shared hook."
