= Nino Paid =

American rapper and singer (born 2001)

- Also known as: Zeal
- Born: Jacquan Andrews; 2002 or 2003 (age 23–24)
- Origin: Landover, Maryland, U.S.
- Genre: Hip-hop
- Occupation: Rapper
- Years active: 2022–present
- Labels: Signal; Columbia

Jacquan Andrews, known professionally as Nino Paid, is an American rapper from Landover, Maryland. He released his first single, "Pain & Possibilities," from his debut studio album Can't Go Bacc, which led to him signing a distribution deal with Signal Records. As of 2025, he has released three studio albums. He was named on Pigeons & Planes' 2025 list of "25 Artists to Watch."

== Early life ==
Jacquan Andrews grew up in Prince George's County, Maryland. Around the age of four, he and his three siblings were removed from their parents' custody by D.C. child services, split into pairs, and placed in the foster care system. He experienced years of abuse and homelessness before he and his younger sister were adopted by a construction worker father and a church cook mother.

Initially, Andrews was wary of moving into their newfound home, having learned not to expect stability from the foster care system. He remembered telling his sister not to unpack her bag so they wouldn't "get too comfortable where we are right here," though his mother promised him she "will never give up on" them. Andrews called his mother a "saint," where she never drank or smoked, but had a complicated relationship with his late father. Because his mother was traditional, he wore his father's old clothes to school, which resulted in him being singled out among his peers.

Andrews began making songs at around the age of eight. At 14, he began rapping under the stage name Zeal, releasing his first song, "Change," on August 9, 2017. He halted his musical career before returning to the scene as Nino Paid in 2022.

During high school, he spent time in in-school suspension (ISS). He later earned his GED while incarcerated at Philadelphia's juvenile detention center on charges of robbery and auto theft. After being released, he enrolled at Prince George's Community College but dropped out during his first semester.

== Career ==
At 22, Andrews dropped his debut single, Pain & Possibilities, on August 25, 2023, which gained traction on the social news website Reddit. It also marked the moment he decided to take music seriously. He signed a distribution deal with Signal Records, a joint venture with Columbia Records and an imprint label of Sony Music, and released his first studio album, Can't Go Bacc, on April 4, 2024. This was followed by a slew of standalone singles being digitally released.

His sophomore album, Love Me as I Am, was released on February 4, 2025, which was described as autobiographical and personal. He embarked on a mini four-date promotional tour later that year in April. He was announced as part of the lineup for Lyrical Lemonade's 2025 Summer Smash, performing on Day 2 of the event.

In June 2025, Andrews was named as one of the 12 artists on that year's XXL Freshman List. He opened for Jessie Murph on her Worldwide Hysteria Tour in 2025.

On August 4, 2026, Andrews released his third album, Somewhere Over The Rainbow. He is scheduled to embark on the Somewhere Over The Rainbow Tour in support of the album, which begins on August 26, 2026 in Minneapolis and concludes on September 19, 2026 in Phoenix.

== Personal life ==
Andrews has a history of drug abuse and has even openly spoken about his experiences with it. He would often spend a large amount of cash on drugs, claiming that he built a solid rapport with fellow Maryland rapper HavinMotion, and would often buy multiple pints of pharmaceutical drugs from him.

=== Legal issues ===
Andrews was arrested on July 24, 2025, in Maryland on charges of vehicle theft. He was released the following day on his own recognizance. Andrews was arrested in Detroit during his Somewhere Over The Rainbow tour on September 1, 2026. He was arrested in connection with the armed robbery and killing of Keion Borders in an Atlanta condo. Andrews was held in Wayne County Jail in Michigan, but he was later extradited to Atlanta. On October 15, 2026, Andrews and Warhol.SS were arrested, with Andrews being charged with felony murder, armed robbery, and aggravated assault.

== Discography ==
=== Studio albums ===
Title	Details
Can't Go Bacc	Released: April 4, 2024; Label: Signal, Columbia; Format: Digital download, streaming
Love Me as I Am	Released: February 4, 2025; Label: Signal, Columbia; Format: Digital download, streaming
Somewhere Over The Rainbow	Released: August 4, 2026; Label: Signal, Columbia; Format: Digital download, streaming

=== Charted singles ===
Title	Year	Peak chart positions	Certifications	Album
Title	Year	US R&B/HH	Certifications	Album
"Tree on the Hill (Lunch Break Freestyle)" (with Lyrical Lemonade)	2025	35	RIAA: Gold	Non-album single

=== Music videos ===
Title	Year	Director
"Been Thru"	2023	Michael Newell
"Pain & Possibilities"	2023	Shotsbyron
"Love Me or Hate Me"	2023	Shotsbyron
"Feel Better"	2023	Kiiru
"My Turn"	2024	OCDavee
"When I Was Young"	2024	Kiiru
"JB Couch"	2024	Kiiru
"Heart Eyes"	2024	Kiiru
"Pain & Belts" (with Yung Dizzy)	2024	Unknown
"Smile"	2024	Smileswithnotooth
"Fall Off"	2024	OCDavee
"Long Live Webey"	2024	MigoLex
"Atlanta"	2024	PublicGoat
"When You're Older"	2024	Unknown
"Money Problems" (with Lil Gray)	2024	Kiiru
"Kryptonite"	2024	Kiiru
"Midnight Miami" (featuring Konvy)	2024	Jedifilms
"Champagne"	2024	Deshay TheLegend
"Relapse"	2024	Deshay TheLegend
"Play This at My Funeral"	2024	ShotByAddict
"Tyreek Hill"	2024	D.creamm Visuals
"Cooln" (with BabyChiefDoit and PlaqueBoyMax)	2024	Kxrrupt
"12am in LA"	2024	Kxrrupt
"Joey Story"	2025	Ben10_4K
"Be Safe"	2025	Deshay TheLegend
"What If We Made It"	2025	Ben10_4K
"Tomorrow Will Be Better"	2025	D.creamm Visuals
"Real Life"	2025	Deshay TheLegend
"Old Me"	2025	Deshay TheLegend
"Regular Type" (with Chow Lee)	2025	Wonton Designz
"Dear Mama"	2025	Deshay TheLegend

== Tours ==
- Love Me as I Am Tour (2025)
- Somewhere Over The Rainbow Tour (2026)
