= Love Ghost (band) =

American alternative rock band

Background information
- Origin: Los Angeles, California, U.S.
- Genres: Alternative rock; Indie rock; Emo rap; Rap rock
- Years active: 2013–present
- Members: Finnegan Seeker Bell; Daniel Alcala; Alex Martinez; Dani Davila; Thelonious Cundieff
- Past members: Mya Green; Ale Sierra; Ryan Stevens; Samson Young; Cory Batcher; Daniel Gallardo
- Website: loveghost.com

Love Ghost is an American alternative rock band from Los Angeles, California. It was formed in 2013 by vocalist, guitarist and songwriter Finnegan Seeker Bell. Critics have described its music as combining elements of hip-hop, trap, emo and grunge.

The band has collaborated with artists including Rico Nasty, Adan Cruz, Santa RM, Mabiland, Tankurt Manas, Kamiyada+, Original God and Strange Bones.

== History ==
Love Ghost was formed in Los Angeles in 2013 by Finnegan Seeker Bell while he was in middle school. Bell has said that the band's name was inspired by themes of love and death; his original proposed name was "Love Death", which was rejected as "stupid".

In July 2021, Love Ghost released the single "Wolfsbane", featuring American rapper Rico Nasty. Rolling Stone covered the release, while Uproxx described the collaboration as part of Rico Nasty's exploration of alternative rock.

From 2021 onward, the band collaborated with musicians from Mexico, Colombia, Turkey and the United States.

In 2022, Love Ghost performed at Rockpalast's Crossroads Festival in Bonn, Germany.

== Musical style ==
Love Ghost's music has been described by Substream Magazine as "fusing trap, hip-hop, grunge and emo" music.

== Live performances ==
In 2022, Love Ghost performed at Rockpalast's Crossroads Festival in Bonn, Germany.

== Band members ==
Current members

- Finnegan Seeker Bell – lead vocals, guitar, keyboards (2013–present)
- Daniel Alcala – guitar (2019–present)
- Alex Martinez – guitar (2025–present)
- Dani Davila – drums (2025–present)
- Thelonious Cundieff – bass (2025–present)

Former members

- Mya Green – viola (2013–2015)
- Ale Sierra – bass (2017–2019)
- Ryan Stevens – bass (2019–2024)
- Samson Young – drums (2019–2024)
- Cory Batcher – keyboards, bass, backing vocals (2019–2025)
- Daniel Gallardo – drums (2024–2025)

== Discography ==
=== Studio albums ===
- Lobotomy (2018)
- Memento Mori (2024)

=== Extended plays ===
- Love Ghost Vol. 1 (2016)
- Love Ghost Vol. 2 (2017)
- Anarchy and Ashes (2024)
- Venganza (2024)

=== Selected singles ===
- "I'll Be Fine"
- "Beautiful Crime"
- "Closure"
- "HEI$T" (featuring Lucy Loone and Cameron Azi)
- "King of Loneliness"
- "Wolfsbane" (featuring Rico Nasty)
- "Peace = Madness"
- "Rock Me Amadeus"

== Awards and recognition ==
- Official selection – Rockpalast, Germany (2022)
- Winner – Best Rock Band, Monster Music Awards (2026)
