= Anger Management (mixtape) =

2019 mixtape by Rico Nasty and Kenny Beats

Mixtape by Rico Nasty and Kenny Beats
- Released: April 25, 2019
- Recorded: 2019
- Studio: The Cave, Burbank, California
- Genre: Hip hop; trap; punk rap; metal; nu metal
- Length: 18:47
- Label: Sugar Trap
- Producer: Kenny Beats; Baauer

Rico Nasty chronology
Nasty (2018)	Anger Management (2019)	Nightmare Vacation (2020)

Kenny Beats chronology
2 Minute Drills (2018)	Anger Management (2019)	Unlocked (2020)

Singles from Anger Management
- 1. "Big Titties" Released: April 25, 2019

Anger Management is a collaborative mixtape between American musicians Rico Nasty and Kenny Beats. It was released independently on April 25, 2019 through Rico Nasty's label Sugar Trap as a surprise release. Featured artists on the record include Baauer, Splurge, and EarthGang.

== Background and release ==
Rico Nasty and Kenny Beats recorded the entirety of Anger Management within a five-day session in early 2019. On March 24, 2019, Rico Nasty announced the project on Instagram live and noted that it will "probably come out in April [2019]." On why she kept the project a secret from her fans, Rico Nasty said: "I want you guys to really enjoy it and I want you guys to let me enjoy creating it and not be rushing to finish." She revealed the tracklist on April 24, 2019, and Anger Management was officially released the following day.

== Cover artwork ==
The mixtape's cover art was created by Keith Rankin, and was inspired by the cover of the 1991 psychology book, The New Primal Scream, by Arthur Janov. Dom Glover, the creative director of the project, originally approached Rankin with this cover as inspiration. Rankin told The Fader, "As soon as I saw that idea I had a pretty clear image of what it should be, just a straight up view of Rico’s face with the gradient background." The cover art was created using the pen and airbrush tools on Photoshop.

== Composition ==
Musically, Anger Management was noted by critics to be a hip hop record with elements of trap, punk rap, metal, and nu-metal.

Creating the project was therapeutic because I got to exude my emotions in any way that I wanted. I feel like a lot of times when people focus on anger, they forget about what it takes to get you there. I don't know too many people that go zero to 100 as fast as I do when I get mad about something. So, finally making a project that shows that, it just made me way more aware of the process in which people piss you off. It's kind of like a cycle. It's up to you to break that shit. It's up to you to stop allowing people to piss you off, because it happens every day.

— Rico Nasty for Complex, October 2019

== Critical response ==
=== Reception ===
Professional ratings
Aggregate scores
Source	Rating
Metacritic	79/100
Review scores
Source	Rating
The Daily Californian	4/5 stars
Highsnobiety	4/5 stars
HipHopDX	3.3/5
NME	4/5 stars
Pitchfork	7.6/10
Rolling Stone	4/5 stars

According to the review aggregator Metacritic, Anger Management received "generally favorable reviews" based on a weighted average score of 79 out of 100 from 4 critic scores.

Kyann-Sian Williams of NME described the mixtape as a "bracing, addictive record" which "takes the listener on a journey through anger to acceptance, finally arriving at a sense of calm. It's a great concept, and a great album." Lakin Starling of Pitchfork described the record as "a hell of a rap-production slapper, but most of all it's a turning point in Rico's evolution," noting that "[Rico] remains one of the heaviest hitters in the no-rules arena of rap." Nathan Ma of Highsnobiety wrote "At its heart, Anger Management is an overwhelmingly visceral, engaging, and consuming project," and concluded that "Rico Nasty is, among other things, a professional." Danny Schwart of Rolling Stone praised the collaborative efforts of the project and the energy between the duo, writing, "This overpowering 18-minute release reveals Rico and Kenny to be the most high-voltage rapper-producer combo around. [...] the progression they've achieved on Anger Management, indicate that Rico and Kenny will probably be career-long collaborators. Rico is only 21 and her future is incredibly bright — especially with Kenny at her side to help her realize her potential."

In a slightly more negative review, Daniel Spielberg of HipHopDX noted that "Instead of replicating last year's [Nasty], [Rico Nasty] is clearly set on experimenting and expanding her sound. Even though it shows that she's a risk taker, Anger Management is unfortunately half-baked."

=== Accolades ===
Anger Managagement appeared on multiple critic's lists.

Publication	List	Rank	Ref.
Billboard	The 50 Best Albums of 2019 (Mid-Year)	—	
Complex	The 50 Best Albums of 2019 (Mid-Year)	16	
Complex	The 50 Best Albums of 2019	35	
Crack	The Top 50 Albums of 2019	39	
Dazed	The 20 Best Albums of 2019	8	
Dummy	The 50 Best Albums of 2019	32	
Fact	The Best Albums of 2019	—	
The Fader	The Best Albums of 2019	—	
GQ	The Best Albums of 2019	—	
NME	The Best Albums of 2019 (Mid-Year)	—	
Pitchfork	The 50 Best Albums of 2019	43	
Rolling Stone	The 50 Best Albums of 2019	45	
Rolling Stone	The 50 Best Albums of 2019 (Mid-Year)	—	
Rolling Stone	The 20 Best Hip-Hop Albums of 2019	10	
Stereogum	The 50 Best Albums of 2019	23	
Stereogum	The 50 Best Albums of 2019 (Mid-Year)	9	
Stereogum	The 10 Best Rap Albums of 2019	3	
Vice	The 100 Best Albums of 2019	21	

== Track listing ==
Credits adapted from Tidal and ASCAP.

Anger Management track listing
No.	Title	Writer(s)	Length
1.	"Cold"	Maria-Cecilia Kelly; Kenneth Blume III; Malik Foxx-Parker	2:34
2.	"Cheat Code" (featuring Baauer)	Kelly; Blume III; Harry Rodrigues	2:18
3.	"Hatin"	Kelly; Blume III; Foxx-Parker	2:20
4.	"Big Titties" (featuring Baauer and EarthGang)	Kelly; Blume III; Rodrigues; Eian Parker; Olu Fann	2:52
5.	"Nasty World (Skit)"	Kelly; Blume III	0:48
6.	"Relative"	Kelly; Blume III; Rory Quigley; Foxx-Parker; Christopher Martin; Lawrence Parker; Johntá Austin; Andre Evans; Alfred Antoine	1:21
7.	"Mood" (featuring Splurge)	Kelly; Blume III; Foxx-Parker; Aaron Harbor	2:05
8.	"Sell Out"	Kelly; Blume III; Nils Noehden	2:22
9.	"Again"	Kelly; Blume III; Foxx-Parker; Jocelyn Donald	2:07
Total length:			18:47

Sample credits

- "Hatin" contains a sample from "Dirt off Your Shoulder", written by Shawn Corey Carter and Timothy Mosley, as performed by Jay-Z.
- "Relative" contains a sample from "Can't Be Wasting My Time", written by Christopher Martin, Lawrence Parker, Johntá Austin, Andre Evans, and Alfred Antoine, as performed by Mona Lisa.

== Personnel ==
Credits adapted from Tidal.

- Kenny Beats – producer (all tracks)
- Rico Nasty – vocals (all tracks)
- Baauer – producer (tracks 2, 4)
- Harry Fraud – uncredited co-producer (track 6)
- Splurge – vocals (track 7)
- Nils – uncredited co-producer (track 8)
- Jozzy – writer (track 9)
- The Crate League – uncredited co-producer (track 9)
- Alex Tumay – mixer (all tracks)
- Joe LaPorta – mastering engineer (all tracks)
