= Warhol.SS =

American rapper (born c. 1997)

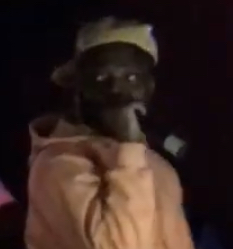
- Myles performing in 2019

Background information
- Born: Zahir Myles c.1997 (age 28–29); Chicago, Illinois, US
- Origin: Atlanta, Georgia, US
- Genre: Hip-hop
- Occupation: Rapper
- Instrument: Vocals
- Years active: 2015–present

Zahir Myles (born c. 1997), better known by his stage name Warhol.SS, is an American rapper from Chicago. He has collaborated with rappers such as Famous Dex, Lil Mosey, Lil Tecca, and Ugly God.

== Biography ==
Myles was born in Chicago c. 1997, and moved to Minneapolis at 10 before moving to Atlanta at age 16. In a 2020 interview with HipHopDX, he stated that he attended Western Illinois University for a degree in business marketing, but dropped out after one week to pursue rapping. He released his first song, "Unititled16", in 2015. He uses the moniker Warhol.SS, after artist Andy Warhol, with "SS" being an initialism for "Super Speed".

In September 2017, his EP, Where's Warhol?, was released, and half of the songs landed on SoundCloud's "new and hot chart". Including "Pistons" at no. 20, "Chicago" at no. 34, and "Froze" at no. 41. Also in 2017, he went on tour with Thouxanbanfauni and UnoTheActivist. He also pitched for the 2019 XXL Freshman Class.

In May 2018, Myles collaborated with Ski Mask the Slump God and Kid Trunks in the song "Not Legal". In 2019, he released his album Chest Pains, which contained features from Hoodrich Pablo Juan, Rico Nasty, and UnoTheActivist, with production being handled by Harry Fraud and Kenny Beats.

In 2019, Myles was featured on Master Kato of Shoreline Mafia's single "Lick". He later was featured in the song "Mind Right" for the album Party Pack. Vol 2.

In 2022, Myles released his album Where's Warhol 2, after four years without releasing an album. He released his album Studio 54 in January 2026.

== Personal life ==
On October 15, 2026, Myles and Nino Paid arrested, with Myles being charged with felony murder, armed robbery, and aggravated assault.

== Discography ==
=== Albums ===
- Warhol '16 (2017)
- Chest Pains (2019)
- Where's Warhol 2 (2022)
- 3200 Vol 2 (2023)
- Studio 54 (2026)

=== Extended plays ===
- Where's Warhol (2017)
- 3200 (2017)
- M.I.A (2018)
- Free Andy II (2021)
- 3peat (2022)
