= Own It (Rico Nasty song) =

2020 single by Rico Nasty

Single by Rico Nasty

from the album Nightmare Vacation
- Released: September 17, 2020
- Length: 2:09
- Label: Atlantic; Sugar Trap
- Songwriter: Maria Kelly
- Producers: Camden; Avedon; Alter Ego

Rico Nasty singles chronology
"iPhone" (2020)	"Own It" (2020)	"Don't Like Me" (2020)

Music video
- "Own It" on YouTube

"Own It" is a song by American rapper Rico Nasty, released on September 17, 2020 though Atlantic Records and her own Sugar Trap label as the second single from her debut studio album, Nightmare Vacation (2020). The song's music video was directed by Philippa Price and was met with critical acclaim upon release, specifically towards the costumes worn by Rico Nasty and the general aesthetic of the video.

== Background and release ==
On the motive behind the song, Rico Nasty told Metal Magazine that it was "built upon owning yourself. The good, the bad & the ugly".

"Own It" was preceded by the lead single "iPhone" which was released a month before on August 13, 2020.

== Critical reception ==
Chris DeVille of Stereogum described "Own It" as "danceable and extremely fun" and wrote, "Over rhythmically charged production that knocks hard while erring on Rico's more accessible side, she raps a string of boasts." In his rundown of the tracks released in that week, Billy Niles of E! described the song as a "bouncy bop", while Patrick Johnson of Hypebeast noted that it "showcases just how singular both her talent and vision are." BrooklynVegan described the song as "booming" and "super catchy", and expressed their anticipation for Nightmare Vacation, writing that if "'Own It' is anything to go by, it's gonna be a good one." Jon Powell of Revolt praised Rico Nasty, writing that "[she] is arguably one of the few artists in hip hop truly pushing the boundaries of style as well as genre with every one of her releases."

== Music video ==
An accompanying music video was released with the song and was directed by Philippa Price. The music video was met with critical acclaim upon release. Evan Minsker of Pitchfork described the video as "extravagant" and the outfits worn as "exceptional", while Chris DeVille of Stereogum described the video as "visually stunning" and the outfits worn as "outrageous". Greta Brereton of NME also described the video as "eclectic" and the outfits worn as "extravagant". Kyle Munzenrieder of the American fashion magazine W wrote that with the video, "Rico Nasty cements herself as a maximalist fashion icon". Allie Gregory of Exclaim! also wrote that "Rico Nasty puts her opulence on display" with the music video. Costumes in the video that were praised by Munzenrieder include a Thom Browne dress paired with a wig fashioned to look like a small cage, "a manicure adorned with the heads of shrimp, a tiara with lit blunts in place of jewels, and a series of charms that spell out her name hanging from piercings where her eyebrows should be". Other scenes praised by Aaron Williams of Uproxx include when Rico Nasty "dons a spike covered, bright yellow vinyl mask that covers everything but her mouth" and when "she presents [herself] as a twisted housewife." Throughout the video, Rico Nasty is often surrounded by "unexplained" wild animals including opossums, ducklings and raccoons. Jordan Rose of Complex wrote:

"Own It" is reflective of all the unique aspects of Rico, as she switches from outfit to outfit, each starkly different from the last. From rocking a piece that looks akin to a Maison Margiela mask with clears spikes across it, to styling her hair in braids that spell "Rico" as she swings surrounded by possums and other animals, the entire aesthetic of the video looks to give fans a sneak peek of what they might expect from her album. Many of the looks also feel like they draw some inspiration from styles seen in Tim Burton movies like Edward Scissorhands.

Konstantino Pappis of Our Culture Mag described the video as "bizarre", while Allie Gregory of Exclaim! called it "opulent". Chris DeVille of Stereogum concluded that with the music video, Rico Nasty "carr[ies] the torch for '90s rap weirdos like Busta Rhymes and Missy Elliott." Patrick Johnson of Hypebeast also agreed with this statement, writing that her "signature out-of-this-world styling is as amplified as ever" with Price "captur[ing] the surreal scenes through fish-eye camera lenses reminiscent of 1990s Busta Rhymes and Missy Elliott visuals". Aaron Williams of Uproxx wrote that the video "pushes pride and self-confidence" and noted that "her makeup and hair are the stars of the video, pushing the boundaries of even what we're used to seeing from the quirky star."

== Credits ==
Adapted from Tidal:

- Maria Kelly – songwriter, vocals
- Camden – producer, songwriter, programmer
- Avedon – producer, songwriter, programmer
- Alter Ego – producer, songwriter, programmer
- Chris Athens – masterer
- Joe Fitz – mixer

== Release history ==
Region	Date	Format(s)	Label(s)	Ref.
Various	September 17, 2020	Digital download; streaming	Atlantic; Sugar Trap	
