= Ppcocaine =

American rapper and social media personality (born 2001)

ppcocaine
- Also known as: trapbunniebubbles
- Born: Lilliane Katherine Diomi; June 1, 2001 (age 25); Los Angeles, California, U.S.
- Genre: Hip hop
- Occupations: Social media personality; rapper
- Years active: 2020–present
- Label: Columbia • Kyyba Music

Lilliane Catherine Diomi (born June 1, 2001), known professionally as ppcocaine (Note: Abbreviation for pretty pink cocaine.) (previously known as trapbunniebubbles), is an American social media personality and rapper. She (Note: Diomi uses she/they/he pronouns interchangeably; this article uses she/her for consistency and clarity.) is perhaps best known for her song "3 Musketeers" that gained popularity on the video-sharing platform TikTok.

== Early life ==
Diomi was born in the Panorama City neighborhood of Los Angeles and raised in the Santa Clarita area. She is biracial and was born to a Congolese father and a white mother. Raised primarily by her grandparents and father, she attended Canyon High School, Birmingham High School and Golden Valley High School, graduating from the latter. While in high school, she was enrolled in dance classes and worked as an erotic dancer when she was older.

== Career ==
In her early career, Diomi went by the pseudonym trapbunniebubbles.

A snippet of her song "PJ" was posted to her account on the video-sharing platform TikTok in June 2020 and subsequently went viral on the platform. Her debut single, "DDLG", was released in the same month and also gained attention on TikTok. A snippet from an unreleased song, "For That Cash", was posted on her TikTok in July 2020 and was heralded as a "lesbian anthem" on the platform. Diomi released her single "3 Musketeers" featuring fellow rapper NextYoungin in July 2020. The song also gained traction on TikTok. It became her first single to chart in the US and elsewhere, peaking at number 22 on the Billboard Bubbling Under Hot 100 chart and at number 76 on the Irish Singles Chart in August 2020. She later released "PJ" in August 2020. She appeared in the top 10 on Rolling Stone's August 2020 Breakthrough 25 chart of the fastest-rising new artists of the month, and in the same month, signed with Columbia Records. In September 2020, she released a music video for "3 Musketeers". As of March 2024, she has 6.9 million followers on TikTok.

== Public image ==
Jessica Wang of Bustle said ppcocaine is best known for "aggressive vocal deliveries". According to Zoe Haylock of Vulture, she has a "nasally cartoon-character voice". Jon Caramanica of New York Times said her music has a "rascally joy and bad-kid energy", calling it "playfully lewd" and noting that it has become "TikTok grammar" since its release. Time called her vocals "energetic, if chipmunk-esque". In 2020, her song "3 Musketeers" was described by Caramanica as "one of the definitive songs of this summer" and "something of a lesbian anthem on TikTok". Wang called her song "PJ", "an anthem for women psyching each other up" and called her unreleased song "For That Cash" "a lesbian anthem". She gained popularity on both "alt" TikTok and "straight" TikTok. The Los Angeles Times called her songs "so over-the-top sexual that they make 'WAP' read like The Notebook."

Vulture compared her favorably to rappers Megan Thee Stallion, Flo Milli, and Rico Nasty. According to Wang, Diomi's songs became popular on TikTok due to dance videos made at the start of the COVID-19 pandemic. The publication called her "the TikTok star behind, among other trends, the viral 'Shake Some Ass' dance trend".

=== Artistry ===
Diomi has cited American rappers Rico Nasty, Stunna Girl, Bali Baby, and Flo Milli as influences on her music, the former of which featured Diomi in the official remix of the song "Smack a Bitch" on her 2020 album Nightmare Vacation. Diomi is also known for her trademark color pink, usually wearing pink clothes and or bubblegum pink hair.

== Personal life ==
Diomi is genderfluid.

== Discography ==
=== Singles ===
==== As lead artist ====
Title	Year	Peak chart positions		Album
Title	Year	US Bub.	IRE	Album
"DDLG"	2020	—	—	Non-album singles
"3 Musketeers" (featuring NextYoungin)	2020	22	76	Non-album singles
"Catching Feels"	2020	—	—	Non-album singles
"PJ"	2020	—	—	Non-album singles
"That Bitch" (with Delli Boe)	2020	—	—	Non-album singles
"Hugh Hefner"	2020	—	—	Non-album singles
"S.L.U.T."	2020	—	—	Non-album singles
"Level Up"	2021	—	—	Non-album singles
"BMPU"	2021	—	—	Non-album singles
"Homie Hopper"	2022	—	—	Non-album singles
"FOR THAT CASH"	2023	—		Non-album singles
"Like Me"	2024	—	—	Non-album singles
"Tesla"	2025	—	—	Back In Session
"On My Phone"	2025	—	—	Back In Session
"Groupie"	2026	—	—	Non-album singles

==== As featured artist ====
Title	Year	Album
"Rugrat" (YVS Village featuring ppcocaine)	2020	Non-album singles
"Lets Link [Remix]" (WhoHeem featuring ppcocaine)	2020	Non-album singles
"Krispy Kreme" (NextYoungin featuring ppcocaine)	2021	Non-album singles
"IWSS - Remix" (Delli Boe featuring ppcocaine, Kidd Kenn, Stunna Girl)	2021	Non-album singles
"Get On" (VenustheG featuring ppcocaine)	2022	Non-album singles
"Hi, I'm a Slut" (Lil Mariko featuring ppcocaine)	2023	Non-album singles
"MILKSHAKAS" (Coco Bliss featuring ppcocaine)	2023	Non-album singles
"No Warnin" (Coco Bliss featuring ppcocaine)	2023	Non-album singles
"HOT WHEELS" (chase usa featuring ppcocaine)	2025	HOT WHEELS: SCAT PACK

=== Guest appearances ===
List of non-single guest appearances, with other performing artists, showing year released and album name
Title	Year	Other artist(s)	Album
"Smack A Bitch (Remix)"	2020	Rico Nasty, Sukihana, Rubi Rose	Nightmare Vacation
"Depressed B*tch Anthem"	2022	AZ Chike	Chike Different
"Tf You Sayin Hoe"	2025	Coco Bliss	BEEN THAT

=== Music videos ===
Title	Year	Director(s)	Ref.
As lead artist
"DDLG"	2020	Liliane Diomi Shotbylate	
"3 Musketeers" (featuring NextYoungin)	2020	Liliane Diomi; NextYoungin; Bobby Astro	
"S.L.U.T."	2020	Liliane Diomi Roxana Baldovin	
"BMPU"	2021	Liliane Diomi	
"Level Up"	2021	Liliane Diomi Chivalrry	
"Homie Hopper"	2022	Liliane Diomi Bobby Astro	
"Like Me"	2024	Tread	
As featured artist
"Rugrat" (YVS Village featuring ppcocaine)	2020	Parker Toonder	
"Get on" (VenustheG featuring ppcocaine)	2022	PHNTM	
"Depressed B**ch Anthem" (AZ Chike featuring ppcocaine)	2022	Chris Gonzo	
"MILKSHAKAS" (Coco Bliss featuring ppcocaine)	2023	King Cruz	
