= Sugar Trap 2 =

2017 mixtape by Rico Nasty

Mixtape by Rico Nasty
- Released: October 20, 2017
- Genre: Hip hop
- Length: 40:18
- Label: Sugar Trap

Rico Nasty chronology
Tales of Tacobella (2017)	Sugar Trap 2 (2017)	Nasty (2018)

Singles from Sugar Trap 2
- 1. "Poppin" Released: June 19, 2017; 2. "Key Lime OG" Released: October 3, 2017; 3. "Rojo" Released: October 10, 2017; 4. "Blue" Released: October 17, 2017

Sugar Trap 2 is the fifth mixtape by American rapper Rico Nasty. Released independently on October 20, 2017 under her own Sugar Trap label, it was supported by the singles "Poppin", "Key Lime OG", "Rojo" and "Blue". The mixtape features a guest appearance from rapper Famous Dex on "White", as well as production from WhoIsMike on the lead single "Poppin". To support its release, Rico Nasty embarked on the Sugar Trap Tour of North America which began in November and ended in December 2017. American magazine Rolling Stone listed Sugar Trap 2 as one of the 40 Best Rap Albums of 2017.

== Background and release ==
The lead single, "Poppin", was released in June 2017 and gained several million views on YouTube, subsequently being featured in the soundtrack for the second season of the TV series Insecure. The mixtape's second single, "Key Lime OG" was later remixed by rapper Shy Glizzy in January 2018. "Rojo" and "Blue" served as the third and fourth singles, each being released on October 10 and October 17 respectively. Rico Nasty teased the release of Sugar Trap 2 in a video interview with Fuse in September 2017. Approaching its release, Rico Nasty told Complex, "don’t expect me to sing a lot [on Sugar Trap 2]." It serves as a sequel to Rico Nasty's 2016 mixtape Sugar Trap, which was released before Tales of Tacobella (May 2017).

== Critical reception ==
When listing Sugar Trap 2 as one of the Best Rap Albums of 2017, Israel Daramola of Rolling Stone wrote that the mixtape "leaves you completely convinced of [Rico Nasty's] talents" and compared its "bubblegum eccentricity" to that of her previous collaborator Lil Yachty. Daramola noted that she "builds a wave all [on] her own that flashes a variety of moods and attitudes. At times, Sugar Trap 2 sounds like you’re inside Willy Wonka’s chocolate factory – everything seems made out of candy and the vocals are coated in Auto-Tune. Yet there are also hints of sinister grime in the margins. Above all, Rico raps with a very human-sounding charm and every facet of the production bursts with life." Courtney Neal of Revolt wrote that the mixtape "just grazes the surface of Rico Nasty's abilities as an artist while setting the bar for more to come".

== Track listing ==
Adapted from Tidal

All tracks are written by Maria Kelly.

No.	Title	Length
1.	"Key Lime OG"	3:01
2.	"Rojo"	2:24
3.	"Poppin"	2:47
4.	"Sugar Trap"	3:38
5.	"White" (featuring Famous Dex)	2:41
6.	"Everything"	2:32
7.	"Spaceships"	3:34
8.	"Blue"	3:13
9.	"Mad Rich"	3:15
10.	"Phone"	3:31
11.	"Same Thing"	3:05
12.	"Back Up"	2:37
13.	"AR:15"	2:04
14.	"La La Land Outro"	1:56
Total length:		40:18
