= IPhone (song) =

2020 single by Rico Nasty

"iPhone"

Single by Rico Nasty

from the album Nightmare Vacation
- Released: August 13, 2020
- Genre: Hyperpop; rock
- Length: 2:38
- Label: Sugar Trap
- Songwriters: Maria Kelly; Dylan Brady
- Producer: Dylan Brady

Rico Nasty singles chronology
"Aquí Yo Mando" (2020)	"iPhone" (2020)	"Own It" (2020)

Music video
- "iPhone" on YouTube

"iPhone" (stylized in all caps) is a song by American rapper Rico Nasty. Released on August 13, 2020 through her own Sugar Trap label, it served as the lead single off of her debut studio album Nightmare Vacation (2020). Produced by Dylan Brady of the experimental duo 100 gecs, the song is their second collaboration since "Ringtone (remix)". The song also paved the way for several more Brady-produced tracks which feature on Nightmare Vacation, such as "OHFR?" and "Can't Look Down". "iPhone" was named one of the best songs of 2020 by both Pitchfork and NME.

== Background and release ==
In November 2019, Rico Nasty teased the song while on Instagram live in the recording studio. After a bootleg recording of the song gained hype and attention from fans over social media, she said in January 2020 that she would prefer to release it with an additional verse from rapper Lil Uzi Vert. After the success of the single "Ringtone (remix)", a collaboration between Dylan Brady and Rico Nasty among several other artists in February 2020, there was an increased demand from fans online to release "iPhone". On August 4, she quoted a tweet containing a recording of the Instagram live from November 2019 and wrote, "IPHONE is dropping next week ok bye". Rico Nasty officially released the song on August 13, alongside a formal announcement of her debut studio album, Nightmare Vacation (2020). To promote the song, she organized a giveaway of multiple IPhone 11 Pro Max's inside an autographed phone case. The giveaway was organized with the cosmetics brand Il Makiage to additionally promote Rico Nasty's own makeup palette. "iPhone" received a remix from American producer Ookay which was released in September 2020.

== Composition ==
Produced by Brady in the genre of "hyperpop", the song features "blown-out glitchy trap beats" and "warped Auto-Tune[d]" vocals.

== Critical reception ==
Lawrence Burney of The Washington Post wrote that the song "perfectly matches the chaos concocted by the critically adored producers" and that "in just over two minutes, the song goes from trap to trance to pop-punk while [Rico Nasty] goes on about her power, her loneliness and how she keeps forgetting to keep her mask on in a pandemic." John Ochoa of The Recording Academy wrote that "the song is an adrenaline rush of distorted hyperpop paired with Rico's washed-out, razor-sharp rhymes. In the middle of the track, she floats into soft R&B coos that can still cut like rusty blades."

== Music video ==
An accompanying music video was released alongside the song on August 13, 2020. It was directed by British music video director Emil Nava under his production company Ammolite, and was edited by Alex Russek, with creative direction from Rico Nasty and Jason Joyride. The 3D video stars Rico Nasty as a "sultry, alien-ish version of herself who serenades from within the titular smartphone". Allie Gregory of Exclaim! described it as "a glitched-out, animated gecs-created video". Aaron Williams of Uproxx noted that the video "uses surreal imagery to comment on the way technology has consumed our lives as Rico spits boastful lyrics about a crush who gets her to change her ways." Lawrence Burney of The Washington Post wrote that the video's "digital animation allow[s] Rico to take various shapes" including "a Sims-like avatar, then a social media-filtered version of herself, then a blob of pixels trying to escape a television screen."
