= Las Ruinas =

Studio album by Rico Nasty
- Released: July 22, 2022
- Recorded: January–March 2022
- Length: 44:55
- Label: Sugar Trap; Atlantic

Rico Nasty chronology
Nightmare Vacation (2020)	Las Ruinas (2022)	Lethal (2025)

Singles from Las Ruinas
- 1. "Vaderz" Released: April 20, 2022; 2. "Intrusive" Released: May 24, 2022; 3. "Black Punk" Released: June 18, 2022; 4. "Blow Me" Released: July 18, 2022

Las Ruinas (Spanish: "The Ruins") is the second studio album by the American rapper Rico Nasty, released on July 22, 2022, through Sugar Trap and Atlantic Records. The album received generally favorable reviews from critics and debuted at number 22 on the Billboard Heatseekers Albums Chart. It was supported by four singles, "Vaderz", "Intrustive", "Black Punk" and "Blow Me", and a tour of North America between April and May 2023.

== Critical reception ==
Professional ratings
Aggregate scores
Source	Rating
Metacritic	73/100
Review scores
Source	Rating
DIY	4/5 stars
Kerrang!	4/5
The Line of Best Fit	7/10
NME	3/5 stars
Pitchfork	7.1/10

According to the review aggregator Metacritic, Las Ruinas received "generally favorable reviews" based on a weighted average score of 73 out of 100 from 4 critic scores.

== Track listing ==
No.	Title	Length
1.	"Intrusive"	2:04
2.	"Vaderz" (featuring Bktherula)	1:49
3.	"Black Punk"	2:30
4.	"Messy" (featuring Bktherula and Teezo Touchdown)	2:30
5.	"Phuckin Lady"	2:52
6.	"One on 5" (featuring Bibi Bourelly)	2:11
7.	"Gotsa Get Paid"	3:17
8.	"Watch Your Man" (featuring Marshmello)	1:56
9.	"Blow Me"	3:21
10.	"Jungle" (Rico Nasty remix) (with Fred Again)	3:33
11.	"Dance Scream"	2:04
12.	"Skullflower"	2:21
13.	"Focus on Me"	2:14
14.	"Always"	2:57
15.	"Easy" (skit)	3:01
16.	"Into the Dark"	3:12
17.	"Chicken Nugget"	2:56
Total length:		44:55

== Charts ==
Chart performance for Las Ruinas
Chart (2022)	Peak position
US Top Heatseekers Albums (Billboard)	22
