= Lethal (Rico Nasty album) =

2025 studio album by Rico Nasty

Studio album by Rico Nasty
- Released: May 16, 2025
- Genres: Rap rock, emo trap
- Length: 33:53
- Label: Fueled by Ramen
- Producers: Imad Royal; Rogét Chahayed; Rayman on the Beat; Blssd; John DeBold; Elie Rizk; Oscar Santander

Rico Nasty chronology
Las Ruinas (2022)	Lethal (2025)

Singles from Lethal
- 1. "Teethsucker (Yea3x)" Released: February 20, 2025; 2. "On the Low" Released: March 26, 2025; 3. "Butterfly Kisses" Released: May 1, 2025; 4. "Can't Win Em All" Released: May 1, 2025

Lethal is the third studio album by American rapper Rico Nasty, released on May 16, 2025, and is her first through Fueled by Ramen. The album is executive produced by Imad Royal with frequent production from Rayman on the Beat. It received generally favorable reviews.

== Background ==
Rico Nasty released her second album Las Ruinas in 2022. Described as a mix of rage rap and post-punk, it received mixed reviews from publications such as Pitchfork and NME. In 2024, she released a collaborative EDM EP with Boys Noize titled Hardc0re Dr3amz. In an interview with Uproxx she spoke on trying new sounds, having previously switched from sugar trap to rage.

== Release and promotion ==
"Teethsucker (Yea3x)" was released as the album's lead single on February 20, 2025, along with a music video, and announced the album on social media. She described the album as about "being confident and saying fuck everybody else" and as "an ode to yourself". She released the second single, "On the Low", on March 26, and described it as showing a "sweeter" side of the record. The third and final single, "Butterfly Kisses", released on May 1 with "Can't Win Em All" as a surprise B side.

A deluxe edition of the album, titled Lethal-er, was released on December 12, 2025.

== Composition ==
The album is primarily rap rock and emo trap, with influences of pop and metal. The album is executive produced by Imad Royal with frequent production from Rayman on the Beat.

== Reception ==
Professional ratings
Aggregate scores
Source	Rating
Metacritic	71/100
Review scores
Source	Rating
The Arts Desk	3/5 stars
Clash	8/10
DIY	3.5/5 stars
Kerrang!	3/5
Paste	7/10
Pitchfork	6.7/10
Rolling Stone	3.5/5 stars
Spectrum Culture	79%

According to the review aggregator Metacritic, Lethal received "generally favorable reviews" based on a weighted average score of 71 out of 100 from 6 critic scores.

BrooklynVegan described Lethal as "one of her most wide-ranging projects yet, from her rock-oriented abrasion to the sweeter, brighter sounds of her trademark sugar trap, to dark, moody rap songs done in the way that only Rico Nasty can." Clash rated the album eight out of ten and stated, "Rugged, lawless sounds, Lethal crunches hard from first note to last, resonating with venomous, carnal energy." DIY gave it a score of three and a half, noting "Lethal, firmly reasserting the Rico Nasty legacy, is an alluring feat for the US rapper that feels just as trendy as it is against the grain." Rolling Stone, also rating it three and a half, remarked, "The rapper's latest LP, Lethal, matches her characteristic raw energy with a rock-influenced sound and introspective tone." Kerrang! assigned it a rating of three out of five, referring to the album as "a canvas of clashing colours, initially dominated by the clicks and thuds of a drum machine and myriad synths." Alternative Press listed the Lethal as one of the best albums of 2025.

== Track listing ==
Lethal track listing
No.	Title	Writer(s)	Producer(s)	Length
1.	"Who Want It"	Maria Kelly; Rogét Chahayed; Imad Royal	Royal; Chahayed	1:47
2.	"Teethsucker (Yea3x)"	Kelly; Rayman; Royal	Royal; Rayman	2:12
3.	"On the Low"	Kelly; Rayman; Royal; Jesse St. John	Royal; Rayman	2:16
4.	"Pink"	Kelly; Blssd; Rayman; Royal; TrakStar	Blssd; Royal; Rayman	2:24
5.	"Butterfly Kisses"	Kelly; John DeBold; Royal	Royal; DeBold	2:02
6.	"Eat Me!"	Kelly; Rayman; Royal	Angl; Royal; Rayman; TrakStar	2:56
7.	"Soul Snatcher"	Kelly; Blssd; Rayman; Royal	Blssd; Royal; Rayman	1:58
8.	"Grave"	Kelly; Rayman; Royal	Royal; Rayman	1:42
9.	"Son of a Gun"	Kelly; Elie Rizk; Royal	Rizk; Royal	1:51
10.	"Smoke Break"	Kelly; Blaise Railey; Rayman; Royal	Royal; Rayman	1:53
11.	"Crash"	Kelly; Rayman; Royal; St. John	Royal; Rayman	2:42
12.	"Can't Win Em All"	Kelly; 8AE; Stan Greene; Rizk; Royal	Rizk; Royal	2:36
13.	"Say We Did"	Kelly; Royal; Oscar Santander	Royal; Santander	1:50
14.	"You Could Never"	Kelly; Rayman; Royal	Royal; Rayman	2:43
15.	"Smile"	Kelly; Rizk; Royal	Rizk; Royal	3:01
Total length:				33:53

Lethal-er track listing
No.	Title	Writer(s)	Producer(s)	Length
16.	"Pepper"	Kelly; Kenneth Blume	Kenneth Blume	1:58
17.	"Pearls"	Kelly; Santander; Mike Ryan Hector	Hector; Santander	2:37
18.	"Pretea"	Kelly; Austin Dale Corona; Wyatt Bernard	Corona; Bernard	2:24
19.	"Black Lace"	Kelly; Corona; Bernard	Corona; Bernard	2:05
20.	"Stunna"	Kelly; Dylan Wiggins; Santander	Dylan Wiggins; Santander	1:58
Total length:				45:03

=== Note ===
- All titles are stylized in all caps.
