= Nasty (mixtape) =

Mixtape by Rico Nasty
- Released: June 15, 2018
- Genre: Trap
- Length: 36:25
- Label: Atlantic; Sugar Trap

Rico Nasty chronology
Sugar Trap 2 (2017)	Nasty (2018)	Anger Management (2019)

Singles from Nasty
- 1. "Trust Issues" Released: March 16, 2018; 2. "Rage" Released: May 11, 2018; 3. "Countin' Up" Released: June 18, 2018

Nasty is the sixth mixtape by American rapper Rico Nasty. It was released under Sugar Trap and Atlantic Records on June 15, 2018 shortly after the rapper signed to the latter. The record features appearances from rappers BlocBoy JB and Lil Gnar. Prior to the official release of Nasty, the songs "Trust Issues", "Rage" and "Countin' Up" were released chronologically as singles.

== Background and release ==
Rico Nasty released the record's lead single, "Trust Issues", and its music video on March 16, 2018. She released Nasty's second single "Rage" and its music video on May 11, 2018. On June 7, 2018, Rico Nasty announced the release of Nasty via social media. On June 11, she revealed the tracklist and also announced the dates for The Nasty Tour to support the mixtape. Nasty was officially released on June 15, 2018. The record's final single, "Countin' Up" was released on June 18, 2018. Rico Nasty embarked on The Nasty Tour in July.

== Critical response ==
=== Reception ===
Professional ratings
Review scores
Source	Rating
Highsnobiety	3.5/5 stars
Pitchfork	8/10
Rolling Stone	3/5 stars
Spectrum Culture	7.5/10

Nasty received generally positive acclaim from music critics. At Album of the Year, which assigns a normalized rating out of 100 to reviews from professional publications, the mixtape received an average score of 69, based on 5 reviews.

Sheldon Pearce of Pitchfork described Nasty as "one of the hardest rap records of the year," and described Rico Nasty as a "ferocious 21-year-old shapeshifter". Trey Alston of Highsnobiety wrote that the record is "purposefully disorienting and confusing, but it sends its message effectively. Rico Nasty is here and changing, but, most importantly, not going anywhere." Israel Daramola of Spin wrote "Rico Nasty’s confidence is contagious, and her fusion of sounds make her a hypnotizing artist of the future" and described Nasty as "a cohesive and strong body of work–the kind of great summer album that is so energetic and unquestionably hard, that [Rico Nasty] only rise from here." Aaron Williams of Uproxx wrote that the record "bangs wall to wall, and Rico’s smirkingly confident personality shines through on every track". David Bromfield of Spectrum Culture noted that "While rising rappers often end up with their identities groomed out once they hit the big time, Nasty is the rare major-label debut at the intersection of artistry and intent."

In a slightly less positive review, Mosi Reeves of Rolling Stone wrote, "While her debut mixtape for Atlantic Records doesn't feel like a major creative breakthrough, it's a solid introduction to a dynamic, hard-charging voice in what Rico herself dubs 'sugar trap.'"

=== Accolades ===
Nasty appeared on multiple critic's lists.

Publication	List	Rank	Ref.
The Atlantic	The 23 Best Albums of 2018	—	
BrooklynVegan	Top 50 Albums of 2018	32	
BrooklynVegan	The 30 Best Rap Albums of 2018	11	
Fact	The Best Albums of 2018	5	
Highsnobiety	The 25 Best Albums of 2018	23	
Noisey	The 100 Best Albums of 2018	37	
Okayplayer	The Best Albums of 2018	12	
Pitchfork	The 50 Best Albums of 2018	36	
Pitchfork	The Best Rap Albums of 2018	—	
PopMatters	The 10 Best Hip-Hop Albums of 2018	3	
Rolling Stone	The 30 Best Hip-Hop Albums of 2018	28	
Stereogum	The 50 Best Albums of 2018	50	
Stereogum	The 10 Best Rap Albums of 2018	5	
Spin	The 51 Best Albums of 2018	16	

== Track listing ==
Adapted from Tidal

All tracks are written by Maria Kelly.

No.	Title	Length
1.	"Bitch I'm Nasty"	1:31
2.	"Countin' Up"	2:30
3.	"Trust Issues"	3:17
4.	"In The Air" (featuring BlocBoy JB)	2:58
5.	"Pressing Me"	2:42
6.	"Ice Cream"	2:10
7.	"Oreo"	2:55
8.	"Hockey"	2:33
9.	"Won't Change"	2:31
10.	"Life Back"	2:24
11.	"Transformer" (featuring Lil Gnar)	3:01
12.	"Why Oh Why"	2:35
13.	"Rage"	2:20
14.	"Lala"	2:58
Total length:		36:25

== Release history ==
Region	Date	Format(s)	Label(s)	Ref.
Various	June 15, 2018	Digital download; streaming	Atlantic	
Various	November 19, 2018	Vinyl	Atlantic	
Various	January 25, 2019	Cassette	Atlantic	
