= Roof (song) =

2019 single by Rico Nasty

Single by Rico Nasty
- Released: January 29, 2019
- Genre: Trap
- Length: 2:35
- Label: Atlantic
- Songwriters: Rico Nasty; Kenny Beats
- Producer: Kenny Beats

Rico Nasty singles chronology
"Guap (LaLaLa)" (2019)	"Roof" (2019)	"Sandy" (2019)

Music video
- "Roof" on YouTube

"Roof" is a song by American rapper Rico Nasty. It was released as a single on January 29, 2019 through Atlantic Records and produced by Rico Nasty's frequent collaborator Kenny Beats. A trap song, it features Rico Nasty aggressively rapping in a raspy voice. A surrealist music video for the song was released with the song and directed by Cody Dobie. The song and its video were positively reviewed by critics.

== Background and release ==
In the months leading up to the release of "Roof", rapper Rico Nasty released the singles "Big Dick Energy", "Guap (LaLaLa)", and "Wanna Do". "Roof" was released on January 29, 2019 through Atlantic Records. It was produced by Kenny Beats.

== Composition and reception ==
"Roof" is a trap song. Tobias Handke of The Music called it "a futuristic slice of space rap" in which Rico Nasty rapped with a "raspy voice". James Rettig of Stereogum wrote that "Roof" had "an abrasive beat over some loose-lipped boasts" and "a characteristic Rico Nasty brag". Uproxx's Aaron Williams described the song as containing "her usual array of raspy threats over a blaring Kenny Beats production". Israel Daramola of Spin wrote that "Roof" was "funky" and had "an excitable aggression that serves to heighten how the pleasure found in repeating [Rico Nasty]'s hype-filled brags and crass lines". Desire Thompson of Vibe called "Roof" one of the "many things" Rico Nasty did "right". Michael Love Michael of Paper praised "Roof" as "stat[ing] the case for why [Rico Nasty] commands such attention" and called the beat "menacing" and "bass-rattling". BrooklynVegan called "Roof" "very fun".

== Music video ==
The surrealist music video for "Roof" was released on the same day as the song and directed by Cody Dobie. Its aesthetic, which Rico Nasty described as "cyber vaporwave future retro", was inspired by the 1997 science fiction film The Fifth Element. It begins with a robotic voice introducing Rico Nasty and features glitch art and various unrelated scenes in which she wears different outfits, including at the Walter Pyramid, Rico Nasty wearing a shawl, her dancing in the desert, her on a jet ski, her as a mountain, and her breaking through a television screen. Robby Seabrook III, for XXL, wrote that it had "a bigger-than-life feel to it", while Paper's Mike Beckles described it as "a surreal, futuristic dreamscape". Vibe's Desire Thompson wrote that the music video for "Roof" was "filled with goth dystopian planets and psychedelic VHS recordings". XXL included "Roof" on their list of the best hip hop music videos of 2019.
