= YungManny =

American rapper

- Born: Emmanuel Okanlawon; October 3, 2003 (age 23)
- Origin: Prince George's County, Maryland, U.S.
- Genres: Hip-Hop, DMV Rap, Trap, Afrobeats
- Occupations: Rapper, singer
- Years active: 2016–present

Emmanuel Okanlawon (born October 3, 2003), known professionally as YungManny, is an American rapper from Prince George's County, Maryland. He has released two albums, OKANLAWON and Confused, as well as two mixtapes, Wocko Simone's Files and Hey Manny 2. Okanlawon first rose to fame with the release of his track "Murdaman!", which went viral on TikTok, following the release, he followed through with the remix of the track which saw a feature from Chief Keef.

== Personal life ==
Okanlawon was born to first-generation Nigerian immigrant parents and grew up an active member of his church. He is the cousin of fellow rapper Xanman.

He graduated from high school early at the age of fifteen and started studying in college at seventeen, and currently attends Bowie State University.

== Career ==
Okanlawon first started playing music at the age of 10, playing piano at his local church. He started rapping at age 12, when he was trying to get on the TV show, The Rap Game. He has released an album under RCA.

=== "Moana" ===
He released his breakout hit Moana, alongside a music video (featured on his first mixtape Wocko Simone's Files), on June 15, 2018. As of November 21, 2026, the music video had 6.1 million views on YouTube.

The song focuses on his beliefs that success is not worth it if one doesn't enjoy the process and the people they work with.

Moana set a lyrical precedent for Okanlawon's early career, with him choosing not to swear on the song. Additionally, he is seen posing with drills instead of guns in the music video. However, he moved away from this later in his career and began swearing in songs like Murdaman.

=== "Murdaman!" ===
Murdaman! (stylized in all caps) is a song released as a promotional single for his debut album Okanlawon. It was released on March 4, 2022, alongside a promotional music video. The rapper also released a remix with American rapper Chief Keef, on August 9, 2022.

=== "All My Guys Are Ballers" ===
All My Guys Are Ballers is a single that was released on March 28, 2019. The artist also released a music video on YouTube, that as of November 21, 2026 had amassed 4,094,974 views.

=== Stylistic choices ===
Okanlawon's style has been described as loud, brash, and fun, with heavy stylistic similarity to DMV contemporaries, Q Da Fool, Xanman, and Goonew. Okanlawon's early music had no swear words.

== Discography ==
Albums
Title	Album details	Genre
OKANLAWON	Released: August 12, 2022; Label: RCA	Hip-Hop/Rap
Confused	Released: May 27, 2020; Label: Self Released	Hip-Hop/Rap

Mixtapes
Title	Mixtape Details	Genre
Wocko Simone's Files	Released: June 19, 2019; Label: Self Released	Hip-Hop/Rap
Hey Manny 2	Released: January 22, 2019; Label: Self Released	Hip-Hop/Rap

Singles
Title	Release year
Fast Lane!	2024
Excuse My French	2024
DrankMan! (Big Time Kush)	2023
WOCKO SIMONE!	2023
H B C U	2023
Love Is Gone	2023
Lol	2023
Same Trick	2023
Otilo	2023
Kira Noir	2023
African Warlord	2023
Brokeassnggz	2023
Omo Yankee	2022
Dear Your Shitty Self	2022
No Fingaz	2022
Murdaman! (featuring Chief Keef)	2022
Yo To The Station	2022
Rip Virgil	2022
Independent Like Webbie	2022
Worst One	2022
So Silly!	2022
Quagen Tris & Chardonnay	2022
Holland All Alone	2022
BSU (Shut Up)	2022
I Need Love	2022
Bitcoin	2022
Waldo	2022
You Can't Stop The Rain	2021
You Ain't Bulletproof	2021
Plankton	2021
Industrial Revolution	2021
Color Blind	2021
Kenmoor	2021
The One	2021
Ksubi	2020
Where's the Love	2020
Margiela	2020
XD	2020
Imani	2020
Beck and Joe	2020
Blessings In Disguise	2020
The Road	2020
Moana Pt.2	2020
Free Turbo	2020
Sunset	2020
Howard Bison	2020
Casper	2020
Cashapp	2020
Slime World	2020
Youngest In Charge	2020
OMG	2020
Bonfire Pt. 3	2019
Come On Now	2019
Stripes	2019
Mask Down	2019
All My Guys Are Ballers	2019
Moana	2019
I'm Yungmanny	2019
Bonfire Pt. 2	2019
Candela	2019
