= The Globe (student newspaper) =

Pittsburgh, Pennsylvania publication

- Covering the world of Park University news since 1967
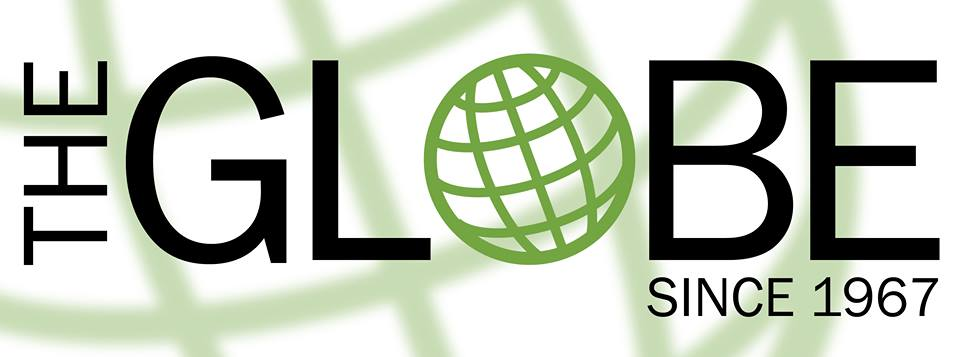
- Type: Weekly student newspaper
- Format: Broadsheet
- Owner: Point Park University
- Editor: Amanda Andrews
- Founded: 1967
- Language: English
- Headquarters: 201 Wood Street; Pittsburgh, Pennsylvania 15222
- Country: United States
- Circulation: 1,000 weekly
- Website: ppuglobe.com

The Globe is a newspaper published by Point Park University in Pittsburgh, Pennsylvania. It was launched in 1967. Published once per week, the paper is written by student journalists. The Pittsburgh Tribune-Review noted in 2006 that The Globe successfully revealed the identity of two buildings that Point Park University was looking into buying, even though the terms of the deal were subject to a confidentiality agreement.

In 2014, the Mayor of Pittsburgh selected then-editor of The Globe Andrew Goldstein for a question during a press meeting. Mayor Bill Peduto indicated he read The Globe regularly and praised its editorial from the same day of publication as his press conference. The Globe has received multiple forms of recognition from the Society of Professional Journalists. In 2013 it was recognized with 11 "Mark of Excellence Awards"; and the following year it received four from the same institution.

== History ==
The Globe was first published in 1967. Its format is a newspaper written by the students of Point Park University. The paper's frequency of publication is once per week. In 1979, The Pittsburgh Press relied upon reporting by The Globe, and cited the work of journalists Bonnie Swain and Sam Cordes in "a series of articles" where they documented incidents where foreign students at the school paid fees for forms to be able to attend.

After The Duquesne Duke paper of Duquesne University ceased production due to pressure from the school in 1989, The Globe editor-elect Dawn Richardson commented to the Pittsburgh Post-Gazette that such an occurrence was unlikely at her institution. According to business manager John Schuck, in 1989 the paper received ten percent of its then-total budget of US$13,000 from student government. An additional $4,000 came from the university itself. The majority of its funding was drawn from marketing and advertisements.

Jennifer Fitch was copy editor of The Globe in 2002; Fitch worked as a journalist for the Pittsburgh Post-Gazette during the same time period. In 2006, the Pittsburgh Tribune-Review reported that The Globe had revealed the identity of two buildings that Point Park University was interested in purchasing in downtown Pittsburgh, even though the school's spokesperson refused to name them to the Tribune-Review under rationale of an existing confidentiality agreement. The Tribune-Review cited The Globe as its source in reporting these two buildings as: "the West Penn building at Wood Street and Fort Pitt Boulevard and the 100 Wood Street Building at Wood and First Avenue."

In 2013, The Globe won 11 "Mark of Excellence Awards" from the Society of Professional Journalists. Andrew Goldstein served as editor of The Globe in 2014. During a meeting with the press on January 15, 2014, the Mayor of Pittsburgh answered a question from Goldstein. Mayor Bill Peduto stated he appreciated The Globe and complimented the publication for its editorial which had been published the same day of the press conference. Kim Roberts was the publication's features editor in 2014; she concurrently worked as a journalist with Point Park News Service. In 2014, The Globe won four "Mark of Excellence Awards" from the Society of Professional Journalists.

== Awards and nominations ==
Awards and nominations received by The Globe
Year	Category	Organization	Number of award(s)	Result	Ref
2013	Mark of Excellence Award	Society of Professional Journalists	11	Won	
2014	Mark of Excellence Award	Society of Professional Journalists	4	Won	

== See also ==
- Downtown Pittsburgh
- The Duquesne Duke
- Duquesne University
- Pittsburgh metropolitan area
- Point State Park
