= Xanman =

American rapper

- Born: Haile Malik Salaam; August 16, 2000 (age 25); Landover, Maryland, U.S
- Genres: Hip hop; trap; drill
- Occupations: Rapper; songwriter; singer
- Years active: 2013–present
- Labels: Cinematic; Atlantic; The Sauce Factory

Haile Malik Salaam (born August 16, 2000), known professionally as Xanman, is an American rapper from Landover, Maryland. He gained significant attention in 2019 with his single "Gucci Down". Xanman has worked with a number of other Maryland rappers including his cousin YungManny and frequent collaborator Goonew.

== Early life ==
Xanman was born Haile Salaam on August 16, 2000, in Landover, Maryland. Raised in Landover, he was exposed to music at an early age. He claims Brightseat Road in Landover as his home. Salaam began to take an interest in the drums at age 5, and was influenced by his uncle, who was a drummer for Go-go legend Chuck Brown. He began recording music while in elementary school, and became proficient with the music software program Pro Tools when he was 11 years old.

== Music career ==
Xanman released his first mixtape "Finesse Lord" in 2013. He went on to release a number of mixtapes in the following years, including No Plug and Broken. As of 2020, Xanman has released 34 mixtapes and a long list of singles. Xanman has collaborated with a number of different artists including Lil Yachty and fellow DC-Area rapper Lil Dude. Their single Many Men was ranked 7th on the Washington Post's list of the best DMV rap songs and albums of 2018. Citing his influences, Salaam named Lil Wayne as one of the most important people in sparking his interest in making rap music.

Describing Xanman's energetic stage presence, Washington Post music critic Chris Richards wrote, "it signals a lust for life, a yearning, an exaggerated stride into the future."

== Legal issues ==
Salaam was arrested on November 8, 2018, and charged with assault. He was sentenced to six months in jail. While incarcerated, a #FreeXan movement gained momentum on Twitter. Upon his release, Xanman released a song entitled First Day Out featuring his cousin and collaborator YungManny.
