= Highsnobiety =

Online music magazine

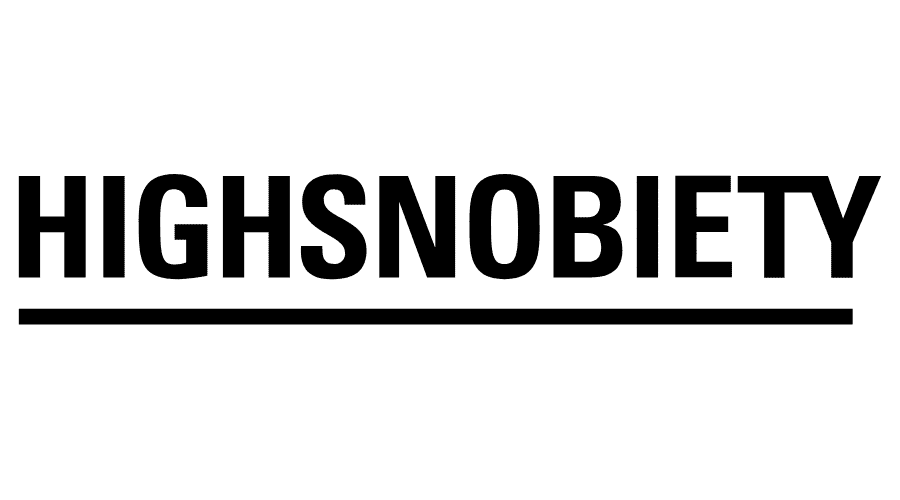
- Website type: Online magazine
- Available in: English
- Headquarters: Berlin, Germany
- Owner: David Fischer
- Parent: Zalando
- Website: highsnobiety.com
- Commercial: Yes
- Registration: No
- Launched: 2005; 21 years ago
- Current status: Active

Highsnobiety is a global fashion and lifestyle media brand founded in 2005 by David Fischer. The youth-focused company reviews fashion and lifestyle products, sells its own clothing lines, and advises other companies how to market fashion and lifestyle products.

It was bought by Zalando in 2022. It is headquartered in Berlin and has offices in Amsterdam, London, Milan, New York, Los Angeles and Sydney. Highsnobiety has a digital-first publishing approach. The print magazine first launched in 2010, with quarterly issues published globally.

== Company activities ==
Highsnobiety Shop, a multi-brand online fashion and lifestyle retailer, was launched in 2019. Highsnobiety launched their apparel collection in 2021.

Since 2018, the brand publishes regular research papers in the fields of luxury and young consumer trends in collaboration with Boston Consulting Group.

In 2021, Highsnobiety launched Gate Zero, a travel retail concept with locations in Zurich International Airport. In 2022, travel retail company Gebr. Heinemann announced a joint venture to expand the concept, beginning with a location at Copenhagen International Airport.

In January 2024, Highsnobiety announced its long-term partnership with Lacoste and their plan to launch an "ultra-limited" edition L003 2K24 sneaker and a clothing line.

== Awards and honors ==
- 2022 D&AD Wood Pencil Award for Advertising, Design, Craft, Culture and Impact
- 2022 Webby Award for Advertising, Media & PR Fashion, Beauty & Lifestyle
- 2022 Webby Award for Video Fashion & Lifestyle (Branded)
- 2018 Digiday Award for Best In-House Content/Brand Studio
- 2017 Webby Award for Cultural Blog/Website
- 2017 BoF 500, Business of Fashion
