= Il Makiage =

Online beauty products brand

- Type: Private
- Industry: Cosmetics
- Founded: 1972
- Headquarters: SoHo, New York City, U.S.
- Key people: Dmitri Kaplun (CEO)
- Website: ilmakiage.com

Il Makiage is a tech-focused beauty brand based in New York City. Originally established by makeup artist Ilana Harkavi, the brand became known within the professional makeup industry but remained largely obscure to the general public for several decades. In 2018, Il Makiage was relaunched as a digital-first, technology-driven beauty company, significantly expanding its presence and recognition internationally. In May 2020 it launched in the United Kingdom, launching in Germany in November 2020 and Australia in June 2021. Il Makiage is a part of the ODDITY platform.

== Name origin ==
The name is an intentionally simplified version of the French word Maquillage, meaning "makeup".

== Company overview ==
Il Makiage was founded in 1972 by New York-based makeup artist Ilana Harkavi. The company was notable for innovations such as windowed eyeshadow packaging and was primarily known within professional circles.

In June 2017, L Catterton purchased a minority stake in the company for $29 million. After the initial investment, brother and sister Oran Holtzman and Shiran Holtzman-Erel, who had previously purchased the brand, re-launched it in 2018 and started its digital approach.

The relaunch included the introduction of the ‘‘PowerMatch’’ algorithm, an AI-driven system designed to improve accuracy in matching customers to complexion products. This approach contributed to rapid growth and international expansion

The brand emphasized a try-and-exchange process, simplifying returns and offering full-sized product gifts, leading to high trust and extensive trial. Highly active social media campaigns, influencer marketing, and engaging tutorials built an online community and generated viral user-driven

Online quizzes not only matched customers to products but captured significant first-party data, enabling further personalization and informing product development.

Dmitri Kaplun is the present CEO of the company.

== Technology ==
The company uses AI and machine learning to match users with beauty and skincare products. In November 2019, Il Makiage acquired Israeli artificial-intelligence company NeoWize Inc. to integrate it with their machine learning programs. In August 2021, the company acquired computer vision startup Voyage81 to further enhance their vision, AI and machine learning capabilities. Il Makiage's parent company ODDITY acquired AI-based molecular discovery company Revela in June 2023.
