= Rico Nasty =

American rapper (born 1997)

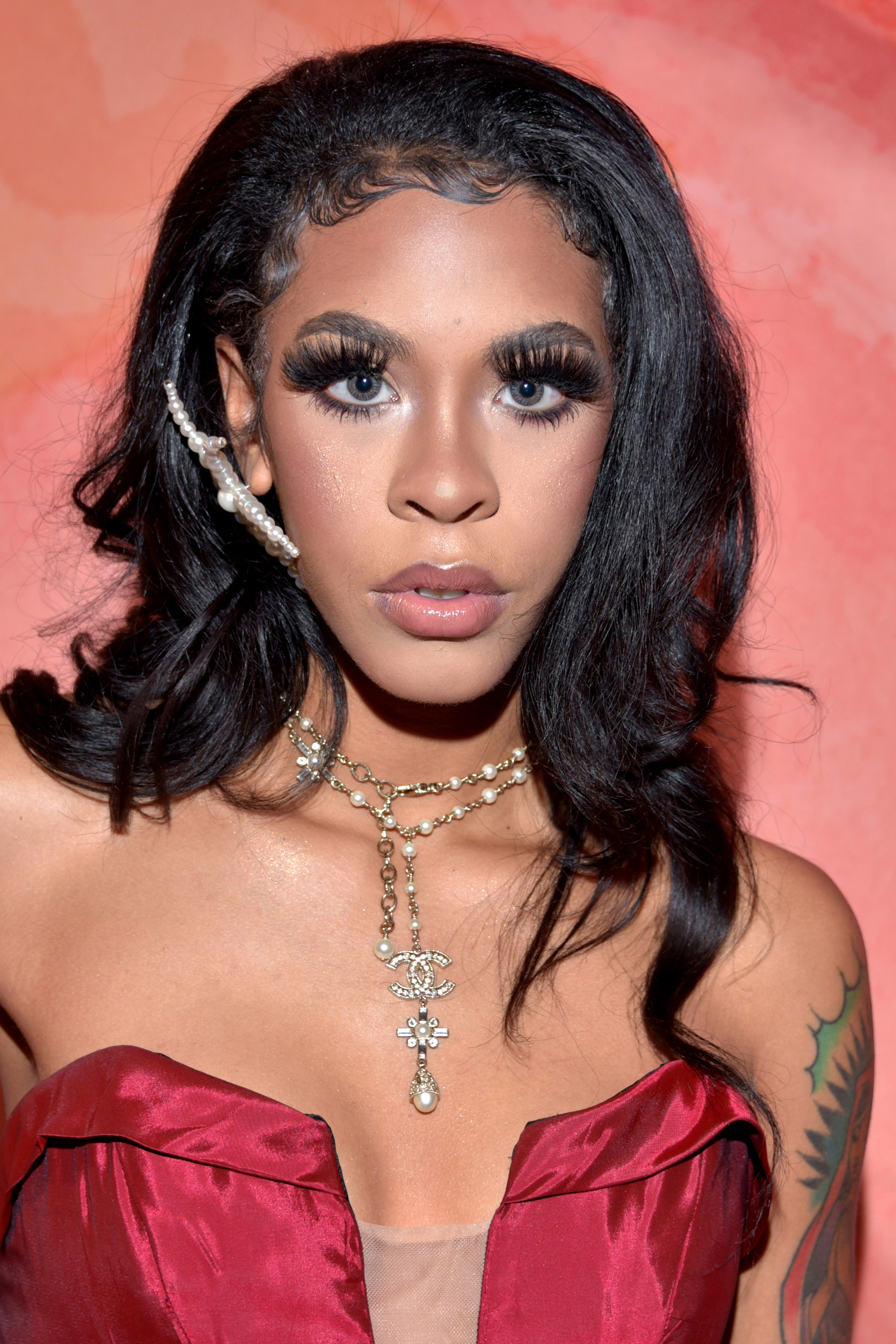
- Rico Nasty in 2019

Background information
- Born: Maria-Cecilia Simone Kelly; May 7, 1997 (age 29); Largo, Maryland, U.S.
- Origin: Prince George's County, Maryland, U.S.
- Genres: DMV hip-hop; punk rap; trap metal
- Occupations: Rapper; singer; songwriter
- Works: Rico Nasty discography
- Years active: 2014–present
- Labels: Atlantic; Fueled By Ramen
- Website: riconastymusic.com

Maria-Cecilia Simone Kelly (born May 7, 1997), known professionally as Rico Nasty, is an American rapper and singer. She began self-releasing while in high school, and had released five solo mixtapes by late 2017. She gained a local following on SoundCloud with her songs "iCarly" and "Hey Arnold". After gaining wider recognition with her 2018 singles "Smack a Bitch" and "Poppin", she signed with Atlantic Records to release her sixth mixtape, Nasty (2018). The label released her collaborative mixtape Anger Management (2019) with Kenny Beats, as well as her first two studio albums, Nightmare Vacation (2020) and Las Ruinas (2022); the former album peaked the US Heatseekers charts. She then parted ways with the label in favor of Fueled by Ramen and Elektra Records, who released her third studio album, Lethal (2025).

== Early life ==
Maria-Cecilia Simone Kelly was born on May 7, 1997 in Largo, Maryland, a suburb of Washington D.C. Her mother is Puerto Rican and her father is African-American. She is their only child. Her father is also a rapper, and introduced her to rap music when she was a child. She was raised in various locations including Prince George's County, Maryland, New York, Virginia, and Washington, D.C. When she was 11, her mother moved to Palmer Park, Maryland where she was enrolled in a Baltimore boarding school (The SEED School of Maryland) for the sixth grade. She was expelled for smoking marijuana at 14 and transferred to Charles Herbert Flowers High School in Prince George's County where her music career began. The following year, her father was sent to prison and her parents divorced.

== Career ==
=== 2014–2017: Career beginnings and early mixtapes ===
Rico started rapping in high school and released her first mixtape, Summer's Eve (2014), when she was in tenth grade at Charles Herbert Flowers High School. After graduating from high school, she started focusing on her music career and released two mixtapes in 2016: The Rico Story and Sugar Trap. Rico Nasty gained some prominence with her 2016 single "iCarly" which amassed over 500,000 views on YouTube within months. She also released the single "Hey Arnold", which was later remixed featuring Atlanta rapper Lil Yachty. The duo would collaborate again in 2017 for the single "Mamacita" as part of The Fate of the Furious: The Album soundtrack.

In May 2017, Rico Nasty released her fourth mixtape, Tales of Tacobella, which is her earliest commercially available release as of September 2020. Kyann-Sian Williams of NME described the mixtape as "otherworldly and synth-heavy" and noted that the mixtape demonstrated Rico's singing abilities. In June 2017, Rico released her single "Poppin" which quickly garnered over five million views on YouTube. The single was also featured on the HBO television series Insecure. Rico's fifth mixtape Sugar Trap 2 was released in October 2017 and featured an appearance from rapper Famous Dex. Critics of Rolling Stone listed the mixtape as one of the Best Rap Albums of 2017. Rico embarked on her "Sugar Trap Tour" in late 2017.

=== 2018–2019: Nasty and Anger Management ===
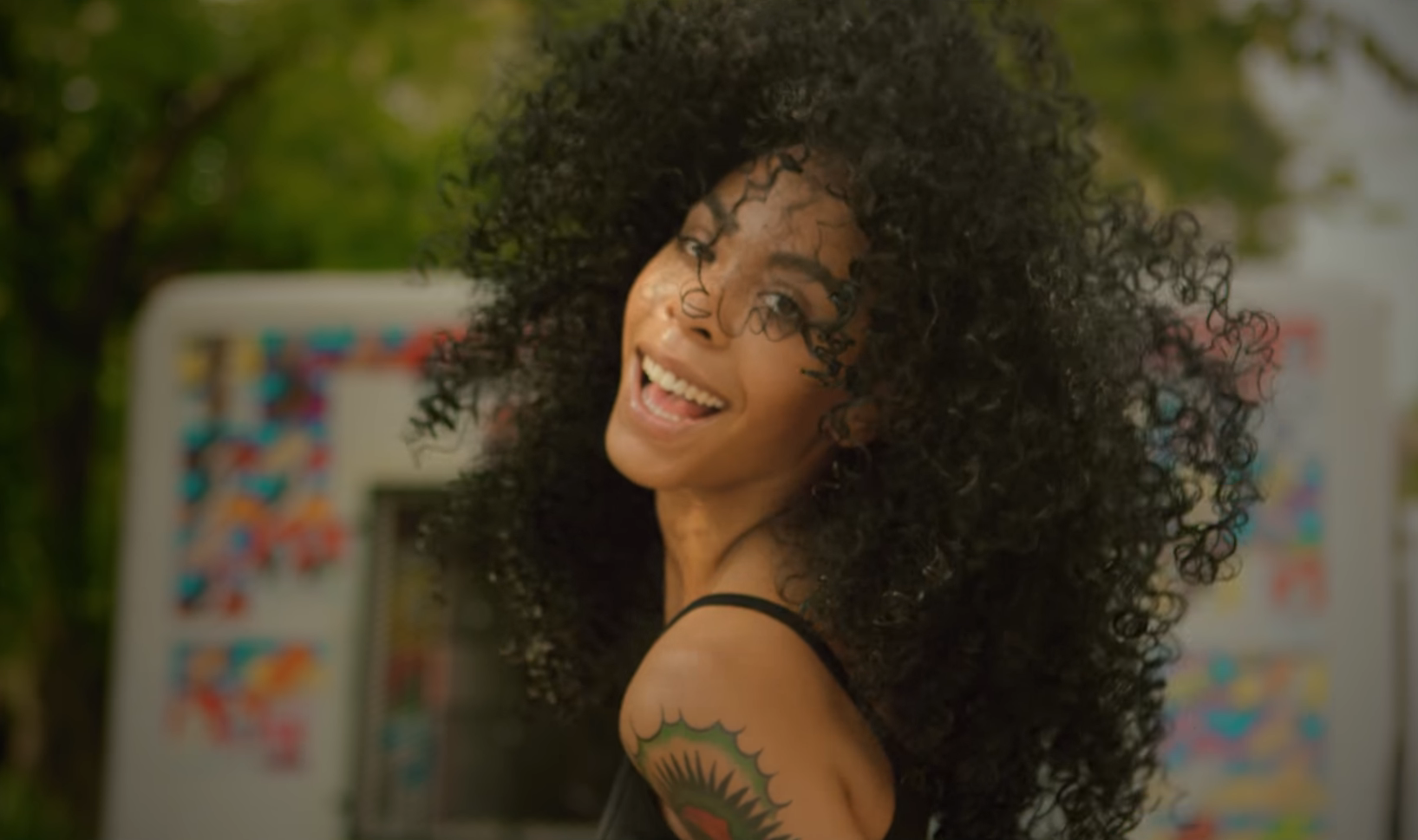
Nasty in March 2018

The singles "Smack a Bitch", "Poppin" and "Key Lime OG" gained prominence in early 2018; all of them meeting and exceeding 10 million YouTube views in that year. The former two songs additionally gained some popularity on the video-sharing platform TikTok after being used in various memes. "Smack a Bitch" was also ranked at No. 2 on The Fader's list of "The 100 Best Songs of 2018". Her rapidly ascendant popularity helped Rico Nasty catch the attention of Atlantic Records, where she signed and released her sixth mixtape and major-label debut, Nasty, in June 2018. The mixtape was generally well received and landed on critics lists of publications such as Rolling Stone, Pitchfork, Stereogum, Noisey, Fact, and Spin, among several others. The mixtape's tracks "Bitch I'm Nasty", "Countin' Up", and "Rage" were ranked on lists of the best songs of 2018 by Paper, Highsnobiety and Pitchfork respectively. In late July, Rico Nasty embarked on and headlined her "The Nasty Tour" to support the mixtape, playing twenty-seven different venues across North America over six weeks and completing the tour in early September.

Rico Nasty appeared in the music video for the remix of "Old Town Road" by Lil Nas X featuring Billy Ray Cyrus. She released the non-album singles accompanied by music videos "Guap (LaLaLa)" in December 2019 and "Roof" in January 2019. She followed them up with several more non-album singles in early 2019: "Sandy", "Party Goin Dumb", "Big Dick Energy", "Hit That", and "Wanna Do". In April 2019, Rico Nasty and producer Kenny Beats supported singer Khalid during the opening night of the Free Spirit World Tour. Rico Nasty made the cover of The Fader for their Summer 2018 issue, and was the subject of a documentary produced by the publication titled Countin' Up.

In April 2019, Rico and producer Kenny Beats released the collaborative mixtape, Anger Management, as a surprise release. The mixtape received critical acclaim and made the critics' lists of several publications including Complex, Rolling Stone, Stereogum, Noisey, Billboard, NME, and Crack. In April 2019, Rico Nasty performed at Coachella Valley Music and Arts Festival for the first time in her career. To support the record, Rico embarked on her "Live in Europe" tour starting in late May and ending in mid July. In June 2019, XXL announced that Rico Nasty was part of their XXL Freshman Class of 2019. She performed at New York Fashion Week in September 2019 and subsequently released the single "Fashion Week". Rico Nasty also performed as a headlining act at Rolling Loud in New York in October 2019.

=== 2020–2024: Nightmare Vacation and Las Ruinas ===
Rico Nasty provided the original song "My Little Alien" to the soundtrack for the 2020 film Scoob! in May 2020. In June 2020, her single "Smack a Bitch" (2017) was certified Gold by the Recording Industry Association of America for selling over 500,000 units in the United States. In June 2020, Rico Nasty also released the single "Dirty" as part of the original soundtrack for the HBO television series Insecure. On August 7, 2020, she appeared alongside Colombian-American singer Kali Uchis on the song "Aquí Yo Mando", which served as the lead single from Uchis' second studio album, Sin Miedo (del Amor y Otros Demonios) (2020).

On August 13, 2020, Rico Nasty released the single "iPhone" as the lead single of her debut studio album, Nightmare Vacation. On the same day, she announced that she would be collaborating with makeup brand Il Makiage on a new makeup line. Rico Nasty made the front cover of British music magazine NME in September 2020. She released "Own It" as the second single from Nightmare Vacation on September 17. In October 2020 she became an ambassador for Rihanna's lingerie brand Savage X Fenty and made a cameo appearance in the Savage X Fenty Show: Vol 2. A few days later, she engaged in a social media campaign with children's TV mascot Hip Hop Harry and Atlantic Records to encourage the general public to vote in the 2020 United States presidential election. She released the song "Don't Like Me" featuring rappers Don Toliver and Gucci Mane as the third single off of Nightmare Vacation. In November 2020, "OHFR?" was released as the fourth single from the album, on the same day that Rico revealed the album's release date and cover art. She also released a visual trailer for the album in November 2020. Rico Nasty revealed the tracklist on December 1, before the album was officially released on December 4. The release of Nightmare Vacation coincided with the release of its fifth single, "STFU". In January 2021, Rico Nasty made her television debut when she performed "OHFR?" on The Tonight Show Starring Jimmy Fallon.

In late 2021, Rico Nasty served as the opening act for Playboi Carti's King Vamp Tour. In numerous cities on the tour, she was booed or had items thrown at her while she was on stage. Nasty's second album, Las Ruinas, was released on July 22, 2022. She supported Kehlani's North American Blue Water Road Trip tour in 2022. On March 29, 2024, Rico Nasty released a collaborative EP with Boys Noize titled Hardc0re Dr3amz.

=== 2025–present: Lethal and RX ===
On February 20, 2025, Nasty announced a rap rock album, titled Lethal, released on May 16, 2025 through Fueled by Ramen, alongside its lead single, "Teethsucker (Yea3x)".

On July 3, 2026, she released "Cupcake" as the lead single to her album RX. The album is scheduled to release on July 24, 2026 and has been described as a return to her "sugar trap sound". She is scheduled to embark on a headlining tour in support of the album alongside supporting Hayley Williams on her "The Hayley Williams Show" tour in the autumn of 2026.

== Artistry and public image ==
=== Genres and "sugar trap" ===
"Smack A Bitch" (2018)
A 12 second sample of Rico Nasty's breakthrough 2018 single "Smack A Bitch", which presents her aggressive, raspy punk rap delivery over an instrumental with trap metal and nu metal influences.

Rico Nasty is known for performing hip hop music and trap music, particularly styles such as punk rap, trap metal, nu metal, pop-trap, SoundCloud rap, and rap rock. She is known for her "aggressive, cutthroat flow" as well as her "spiky style and raspy delivery". Rico Nasty told NME that she "resonate[s] with being a pop-punk princess."

Rico Nasty coined the term "sugar trap" early in her career and has used it as the title of her independent record label as well as two of her mixtapes. Musically, the term has simply been described as "bubbly, upbeat rap" as well as "singing and trap rapping". Lawrence Burney of Noisey noted that sugar trap is "markedly upbeat, bubbly, and self-loving, no matter her chosen delivery", while Kyann-Sian Williams of NME described it as a blend of "hardcore, gruff vocals" and "grungy hooks with softer, computerised beats". Rico Nasty has said that sugar trap has "soft, beautiful, melodic, flowy vibes" as well as elements of "trap music like Chicago drill music, Atlanta trap music, Memphis trap music, little bit of California trap music. I mix everything. If the sound catches my ear, I mix it." She has also described "sugar trap" metaphorically as "a headspace", "a way of fashion" and "a way of life". She also described the term as a "metaphorical place", saying "It's like when you have a really, really bad life and shit good starts happening and you don't know how to adapt to the good shit." In April 2018, Rico Nasty officially trademarked the term "sugar trap".

=== Influences ===
Musically, Rico Nasty has cited Joan Jett, Avril Lavigne and Rihanna as her biggest influences. She has been named as an influence on Flo Milli and ppcocaine.

=== Alter egos and appearance ===
Rico Nasty's use of alter egos and personas in her music have varied throughout her career. These include "Tacobella" (a "vulnerable, sensitive persona"), and "Trap Lavigne", who is inspired by Avril Lavigne. Rico Nasty told NME that her other personas are inspired by David Bowie, Tyler, the Creator, and Nicki Minaj.

Rico Nasty is known for her unique style in punk fashion. Kyle Munzenrieder of the American fashion magazine W has described her as a "maximalist fashion icon". Kyann-Sian Williams of NME wrote, "With her androgynous nature and outlandish style, Rico has been an icon for outcasts for years."

== Personal life ==
At age 18, Rico Nasty gave birth to a son while in her senior year of high school. As she began gaining attention with her music, she quit her job as a hospital receptionist and her manager, Malik Foxx, began buying production equipment.

== Discography ==
- Nightmare Vacation (2020)
- Las Ruinas (2022)
- Lethal (2025)
- RX (2026)

== Filmography ==
=== Short films ===
| Year | Title | Role | Publication | Director | Ref. |
|---|---|---|---|---|---|
| 2019 | Countin' Up | Herself | The Fader | Orian Barki | |
| 2020 | Swipe Night | Herself | Tinder | Karena Evans | |
| 2020 | Savage X Fenty Show: Volume Two | Herself | Amazon Studios | Rihanna | |

=== Television ===
| Year | Title | Role | Ref. |
|---|---|---|---|
| 2026 | Margo's Got Money Troubles | KC | |

== Concert tours ==
Headlining

- The Sugar Trap Tour (2017)
- The Nasty Tour (2018)
- Live in Europe Tour (2019)
- Monster Energy Outbreak Tour (2023)

Supporting

- Free Spirit World Tour (with Khalid and Kenny Beats) (2019)
- King Vamp Tour (with Playboi Carti) (2021)
- Blue Water Road Trip (with Kehlani) (2022)
- “The Hayley Williams Show” (with Hayley Williams) (2026)

== See also ==
- List of Afro-Latinos
