= 100 Gecs discography =

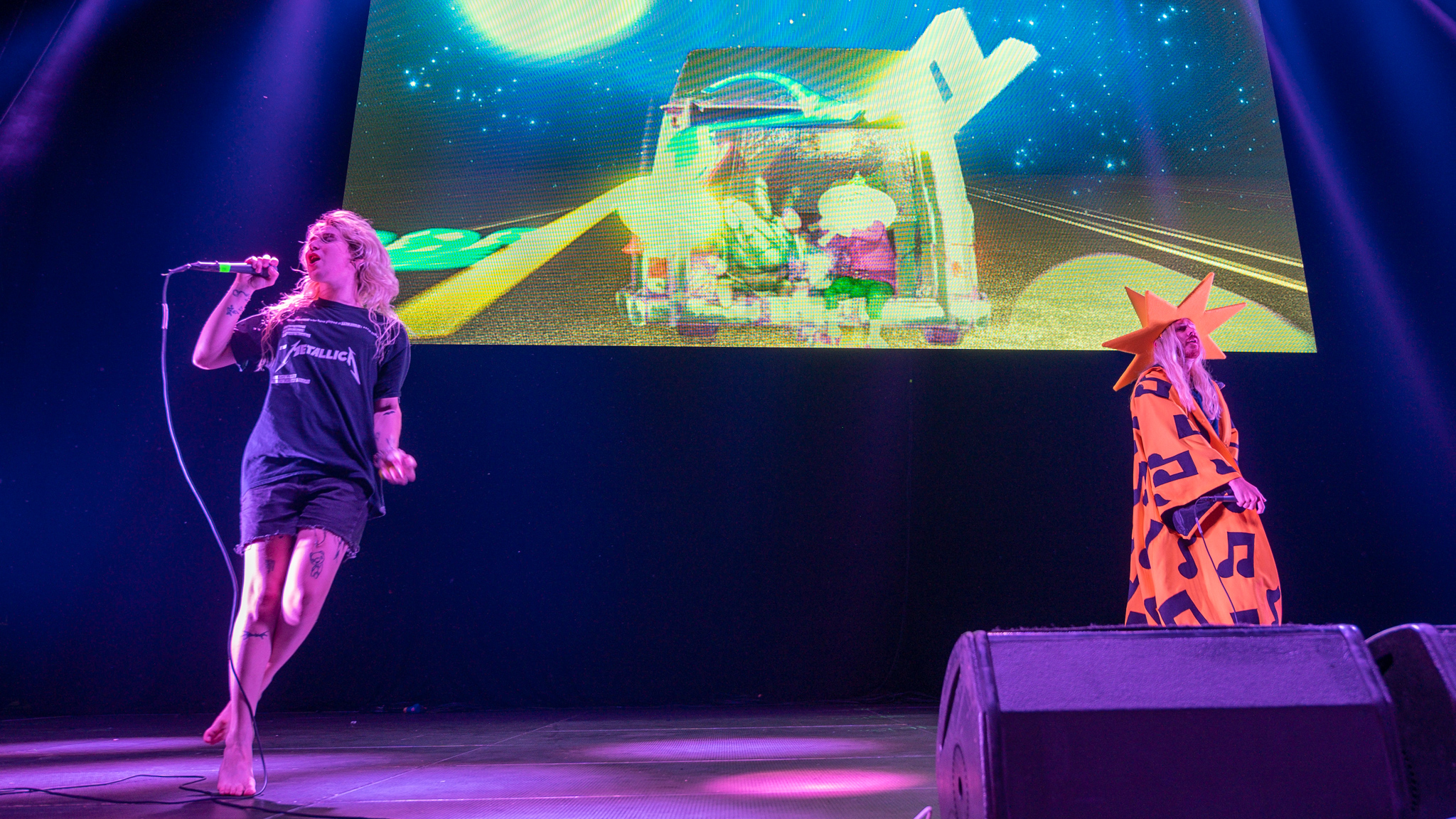
- 100 Gecs performing at Rock im Park 2022 in Nuremberg
- Studio albums: 2
- EPs: 2
- Singles: 11
- Music videos: 8
- Remix albums: 1

The discography of 100 Gecs, an American hyperpop duo, includes two studio albums, two extended plays (EPs) and one remix album. Formed in 2015, the band consists of Dylan Brady and Laura Les. They self-released their debut studio album, 1000 Gecs, in 2019 to positive reviews, followed by a companion remix album, 1000 Gecs and the Tree of Clues, in 2020. They released their second studio album, 10,000 Gecs, in 2023.

== Albums ==
=== Studio albums ===
| Title | Details | Peak chart positions | | | | |
| Title | Details | US | US Indie | US Rock | AUS | UK DL |
|---|---|---|---|---|---|---|
| 1000 Gecs | Released: May 31, 2019; Label: Dog Show; Formats: LP, digital download, streaming, CD | — (Note: 1000 Gecs did not enter the Billboard 200 but peaked at number 94 on the Current Album Sales chart and number seven on the Heatseekers Albums chart.) | 36 | — | — | — |
| 10,000 Gecs | Released: March 17, 2023; Label: Dog Show, Atlantic; Formats: LP, CD, digital download, streaming | 59 | — | 8 | 89 | 49 |

=== Remix albums ===
| Title | Details | Peak chart positions | |
| Title | Details | US | US Alt. |
|---|---|---|---|
| 1000 Gecs and the Tree of Clues | Released: July 10, 2020; Label: Dog Show, Big Beat, Atlantic; Formats: LP, digital download, streaming | 198 | 12 |

== Extended plays ==
| Title | Details |
|---|---|
| 100 Gecs | Released: July 12, 2016; Label: Self-released; Format: Digital download, streaming |
| Snake Eyes | Released: December 2, 2022; Label: Dog Show, Atlantic; Format: Streaming, 10" EP |

== Singles ==
| Title | Year | Peak chart positions | | | | Album |
| Title | Year | US Alt | US Hot Alt | US Rock | NZ Hot | Album |
|---|---|---|---|---|---|---|
| "Money Machine" | 2019 | — | — | 47 | — | 1000 Gecs |
| "Money Machine" (A. G. Cook Remix) | 2019 | — | — | — | — | 1000 Gecs and the Tree of Clues |
| "745 Sticky" (Injury Reserve Remix) | 2019 | — | — | — | | 1000 Gecs and the Tree of Clues |
| "Ringtone" (Remix) (featuring Charli XCX, Rico Nasty and Kero Kero Bonito) | 2020 | — | — | — | — | 1000 Gecs and the Tree of Clues |
| "Gec 2 Ü" (Remix) (featuring Dorian Electra) | 2020 | — | — | — | — | 1000 Gecs and the Tree of Clues |
| "Stupid Horse" (Remix) (featuring Count Baldor and GFOTY) | 2020 | — | — | — | — | 1000 Gecs and the Tree of Clues |
| "Hand Crushed by a Mallet" (Remix) (featuring Fall Out Boy, Craig Owens, Nicole Dollanganger) | 2020 | — | 22 | 23 | 39 | 1000 Gecs and the Tree of Clues |
| "Sympathy 4 the Grinch" | 2020 | — | — | — | — | Non-album single |
| "MeMeMe" | 2021 | — | — | 41 | — | 10,000 Gecs |
| "Doritos & Fritos" | 2022 | — | — | — | — | 10,000 Gecs |
| "Hollywood Baby" | 2023 | 18 | — | 47 | — | 10,000 Gecs |

== Other charted songs ==
| Title | Year | Peak chart positions | | | | Album |
| Title | Year | US Dan. | US Rock | US Hard Rock | NZ Hot | Album |
|---|---|---|---|---|---|---|
| "Torture Me" (featuring Skrillex) | 2022 | 22 | — | — | — | Snake Eyes |
| "Dumbest Girl Alive" | 2023 | — | 37 | — | 30 | 10,000 Gecs |
| "Billy Knows Jamie" | 2023 | — | — | 25 | — | 10,000 Gecs |

== Remixes ==
| Title | Original artist | Year |
|---|---|---|
| "Never Met!" (100 Gecs R3mix) | Cmten featuring Glitch Gum | 2020 |
| "One Step Closer" (100 Gecs Reanimation) | Linkin Park | 2021 |
| "Where's My Head At_" | Basement Jaxx | 2023 |

== Other appearances ==
| Title | Year | Other artist(s) | Album |
|---|---|---|---|
| "Blogs (I Wanna Die On MTV)" | 2019 | Devi McCallion | —N/a |
| "Power Fantasy" | 2020 | Health | Disco4: Part I |
| "Lonely Machines" | 2020 | 3OH!3 | Need |
| "One Bar to Rule Them All" | 2020 | —N/a | Locked Grooves |

== Music videos ==
| Title | Year | Director |
|---|---|---|
| "Money Machine" | 2019 | Gabe Howell |
| "800db Cloud" | 2019 | Shoelacebelt |
| "Gec 2 Ü (remix)" (featuring Dorian Electra) | 2020 | Weston Allen |
| "Stupid Horse (remix)" (featuring GFOTY and Count Baldor) | 2020 | Weston Allen |
| "Hand Crushed by a Mallet (remix)" (featuring Fall Out Boy, Craig Owens, and Nicole Dollanganger) | 2020 | Darío Alva and Weston Allen |
| "Hand Crushed by a Mallet" | 2020 | Weston Allen |
| "MeMeMe" | 2021 | Lewis Grant |
| "Doritos & Fritos" | 2022 | Chris Maggio |
| "Hollywood Baby" | 2023 | |
| "Dumbest Girl Alive" | 2023 | |
| "The Most Wanted Person in the United States" | 2023 | Steve Smith |
| "Billy Knows Jamie" | 2023 | Aidan Cullen |

== Production and songwriting credits ==
| Year | Artist | Song | Album | Written with | Produced with |
|---|---|---|---|---|---|
| 2020 | Rico Nasty | "Let It Out" | Nightmare Vacation | Maria Kelly, Malik Foxx Parker | Sole producer |
| 2020 | Rico Nasty | "Pussy Poppin" | Nightmare Vacation | Maria Kelly, Malik Foxx Parker | Sole producer |
| 2022 | Rico Nasty | "Gotsta Get Paid" | Las Ruinas | Kelly, Vincent Goodyer | 18YOMAN, MXXWLL |
| 2023 | Rico Nasty | "Turn It Up" | Non-album single | Kelly, Parker | Sole producer |
