= Ringtone (remix) =

2020 single by 100 gecs

"Ringtone" (remix)

Single by 100 Gecs featuring Charli XCX, Rico Nasty and Kero Kero Bonito

from the album 1000 Gecs and the Tree of Clues
- Released: February 24, 2020
- Recorded: 2019–early 2020
- Genre: Glitch hop
- Length: 3:35
- Label: Dog Show; Big Beat; Atlantic

100 Gecs singles chronology
"745 Sticky" (Injury Reserve remix) (2019)	"Ringtone" (remix) (2020)	"Gec 2 Ü" (remix) (2020)

Charli XCX singles chronology
"Bricks" (2019)	"Ringtone" (remix) (2020)	"Forever" (2020)

Rico Nasty singles chronology
"IDGAF" (2020)	"Ringtone" (remix) (2020)	"Lightning" (2020)

Kero Kero Bonito singles chronology
"When the Fires Come" (2019)	"Ringtone" (remix) (2020)	"It's Bugsnax" (2020)

Visualizer video
- "Ringtone (remix)" on YouTube

Audio sample
- file; help

"Ringtone" is a song by American experimental musical duo 100 Gecs, composed of Dylan Brady and Laura Les, from 100 Gecs' debut studio album 1000 Gecs (2019). Its remix, included on their remix album 1000 Gecs and the Tree of Clues (2020), features vocals from British singer Charli XCX, American rapper Rico Nasty, and British singer Sarah Bonito of the indie pop band Kero Kero Bonito. The song's production is glitchy with "80's video game-inspired blips" and uses heavy bass and Auto-Tune.

The "Ringtone" remix was first previewed at a live DJ set in January 2020. It was released a month later, on February 24, 2020 as the third single from 1000 Gecs and the Tree of Clues, following the release of the "Money Machine" and "745 Sticky" remixes. The song was met with critical acclaim, with particular praise for Charli XCX's guest appearance.

== Background ==
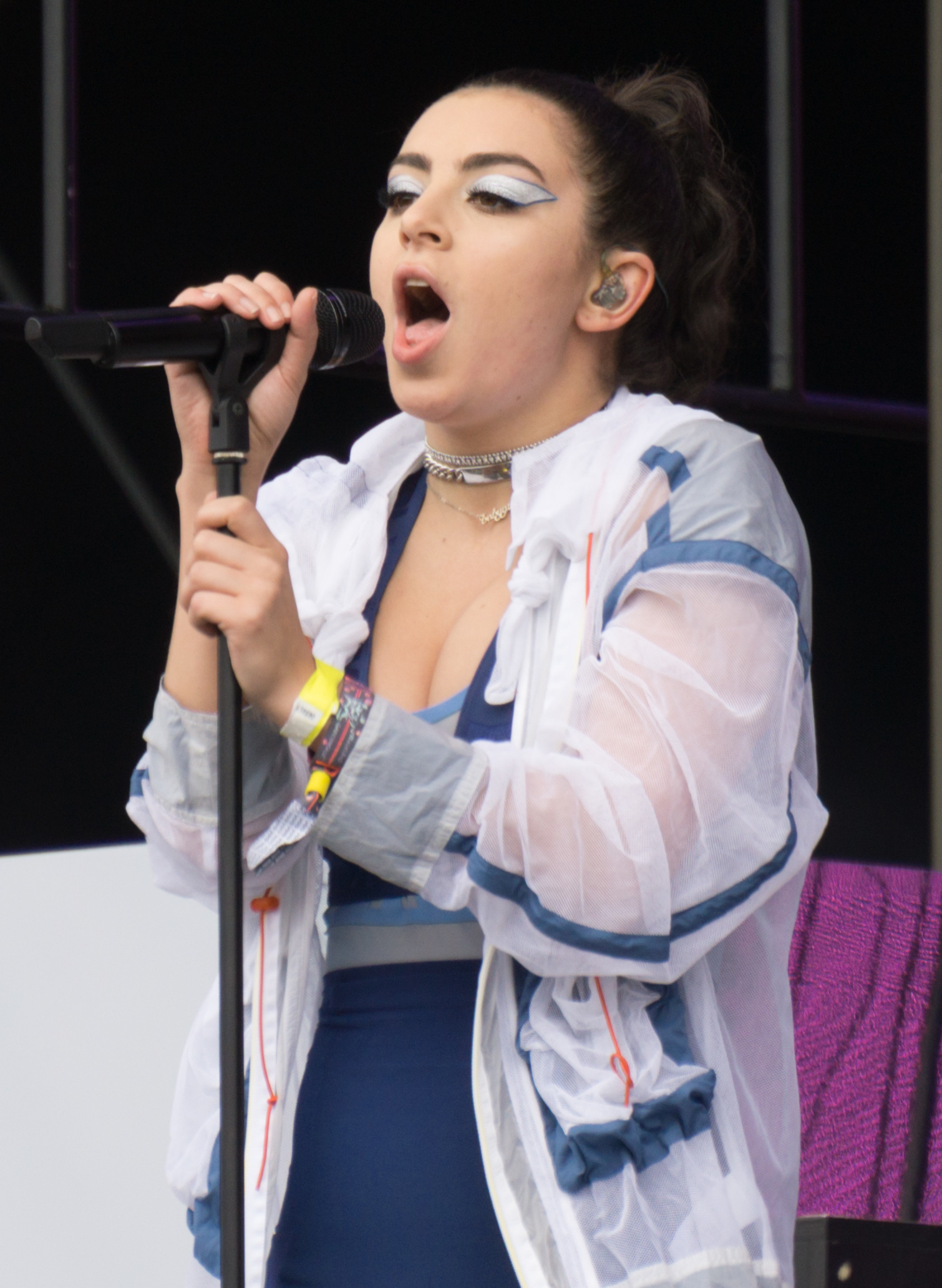
Brady previously worked with British singer Charli XCX (pictured), whose guest appearance on "Ringtone (remix)" was praised by critics.

100 Gecs released their debut album, 1000 Gecs, on May 31, 2019. Jillian Mapes of Pitchfork cited the original version of "Ringtone" a highlight from the album, describing it as "among 100 Gecs' catchiest songs." Brady helped co-produce British singer Charli XCX's song "Click" featuring German singer Kim Petras and Estonian rapper Tommy Cash. "Click" was included on Charli XCX's third studio album Charli, released on September 13, 2019, and was later rereleased as "Click (No Boys Remix)" that replaces Cash with American singer Slayyyter.

On October 23, 2019, 100 Gecs announced an upcoming remix album titled 1000 Gecs and th3 Phant0m M3nac3. A remix of "Money Machine" by British producer A. G. Cook was released alongside the announcement. A. G. Cook is a frequent collaborator of Charli XCX. On November 6, 2019, 100 Gecs released a remix of "745 Sticky" with American hip hop trio Injury Reserve. That same month, American rapper Rico Nasty teased an upcoming collaboration with Brady titled "iPhone"; Nasty said in January 2020 that she'd release the song once American rapper Lil Uzi Vert recorded a verse for it. Upon the release of the "Ringtone" remix, the remix album was renamed 1000 Gecs and the Tree of Clues.

== Composition and lyrics ==
The "Ringtone" remix is less frenzied than its original counterpart and fits with Charli XCX's futuristic pop style. Brendan Wetmore of Paper wrote that the remix has "ten times the bass" of the original version. Patrick Johnson of Hypebeast described the "Ringtone" remix as sporadic and glitchy; Charli XCX sings the chorus on top of "high-pitched vocal samples and 80's video game-inspired blips." In her hook, Charli XCX is vulnerable, similar to her 2017 single "Boys", though she sings about trading many boys for just the one. After the first chorus, Sarah Bonito of the band Kero Kero Bonito sings the next verse. The beat switches for Nasty's verse, who raps over an electric guitar and then sings with Auto-Tune. Les briefly chimes in to ask Charli XCX to sing the hook.

== Release and promotion ==
The "Ringtone" remix was first teased at a live DJ set by producer Umru on January 24, 2020. The remix's existence became known after fan-captured footage of the DJ set was shared online. To provoke fans, Brady teased on Twitter that he had a third collaboration with Nasty on the way, after Nasty previously teased the song "iPhone" in November 2019. On February 21, 2020, New Zealander radio personality Zane Lowe of Apple Music 1 interviewed 100 Gecs to discuss the recording of the "Ringtone" remix and 1000 Gecs and the Tree of Clues. The "Ringtone" remix was officially released on February 24, 2020. As with their other works, the track was released alongside a visualizer, filmed with a negligible budget, on YouTube that features Brady and Les holding up stick puppets of the remix's guest features.

== Critical reception ==
Jillian Mapes of Pitchfork wrote that the "Ringtone" remix plays like a Charli XCX song with Rico Nasty serving in a featured artist role and Kero Kero Bonito providing supporting vocals. Mapes stated that the production is resemblant of PC Music's work and predicted that the song would become an Internet hit. Brendan Wetmore of Paper praised the original version as one of the standout songs off of 1000 Gecs, but wrote that "the addition of the all-star cast for new verses makes the remix a certified hit". Madeline Roth of MTV News wrote that Charli XCX is a "natural fit for the gecs universe" and praised Nasty's and Kero Kero Bonito's bubbly performances. Patrick Johnson of Hypebeast described Charli XCX's chorus as catchy.

== Personnel ==
Credits adapted from Tidal.

- 100 Gecs – lead artist, production
- Charli XCX – featured artist
- Rico Nasty – featured artist
- Kero Kero Bonito – featured artist
- Mike Bozzi – mastering
- Dylan Brady – mixing
- Laura Les – mixing
