= Ska punk =

Fusion music genre

- Stylistic origins: Ska; punk rock; reggae fusion
- Cultural origins: Late 1970s, United Kingdom

Fusion genres
- Skacore; Crack rock steady

Ska punk (or ska-punk) is a fusion genre that mixes ska with punk rock. Ska punk tends to feature brass instruments, especially horns such as trumpets, trombones and woodwind instruments like saxophones, making the genre distinct from other forms of punk rock. It is closely tied to third wave ska, which reached its zenith in the mid-1990s.

Before ska punk began, many ska bands and punk rock bands performed on the same bills. Some music groups from the late 1970s and early 1980s, such as the Clash, the Deadbeats, the Specials, the Beat, and Madness fused characteristics of punk rock and ska, but many of these were punk bands playing an occasional ska-flavored song or ska bands with punk influences. During the late 1980s and early 1990s, ska-punk enjoyed its greatest success, heralded by bands such as Fishbone, the Mighty Mighty Bosstones, Sublime, Less Than Jake, and more.

Ska punk had significant mainstream success in the mid-to-late 1990s, with many bands topping pop and rock music charts. The best-selling ska punk record of the era was No Doubt's Tragic Kingdom (1995), which was certified diamond by the RIAA in 1999 and was certified diamond by Music Canada in 1997. By the early 2000s, many of the bands in ska punk had broken up, and the genre lost mainstream appeal, though it continued to have underground popularity and featured a revival in the late 2010s with bands like the Interrupters returning to chart success, when their song "She's Kerosene" reached the top 5 on alternative and rock music charts in Canada and the US, as well as in the early 2020s with hyperpop duo 100 Gecs album 10,000 Gecs incorporating elements of ska punk to critical acclaim.

== Characteristics ==
Ska punk combines ska music with punk rock music. Ska punk often features wind instruments, especially horns such as saxophones, trombones and trumpets, making the genre distinct from other forms of punk rock. It is similar to traditional Jamaican ska, but faster and heavier.

== History ==
=== Predecessors and early development (late 1970s to early 1990s) ===
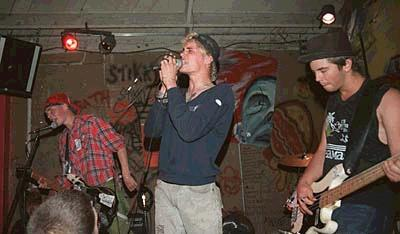
Ska punk band Operation Ivy performing live at 924 Gilman Street in 1988

Before ska punk started, many ska bands and punk rock bands performed on the same bills together and appealed to the same audiences. A ska revival occurred simultaneously around the beginning of British punk rock and the near-simultaneous rebirth of the late 1970s British mod and skinhead movements. During the late 1970s and early 1980s in United Kingdom, many punk rock bands mixed punk rock with ska influences. Pioneering punk rock band the Clash incorporated influences from ska alongside a range of other genres on their seminal 1979 post-punk album London Calling. Songs like 1978's "Kill the Hippies" by the Deadbeats prominently featured horns, although there are no ska elements. Other British bands that were influenced by both punk rock and ska included the Specials, the Beat and Madness. With both films like the 1981 documentary film Dance Craze and supportive radio stations like Los Angeles, California's KROQ, ska crossed the Atlantic. During the 1980s in America, ska punk was underground. However, Fishbone, one of the earliest ska punk bands, achieved moderate success. Another band in America that was semi-popular came from Chapel Hill, North Carolina, called the Pressure Boys. Other ska punk bands from the 1980s and early 1990s include Operation Ivy, The Toasters, Culture Shock, Voodoo Glow Skulls, the Porkers, Sublime, Citizen Fish, the Mighty Mighty Bosstones, the Suicide Machines, MU330 and Dance Hall Crashers.

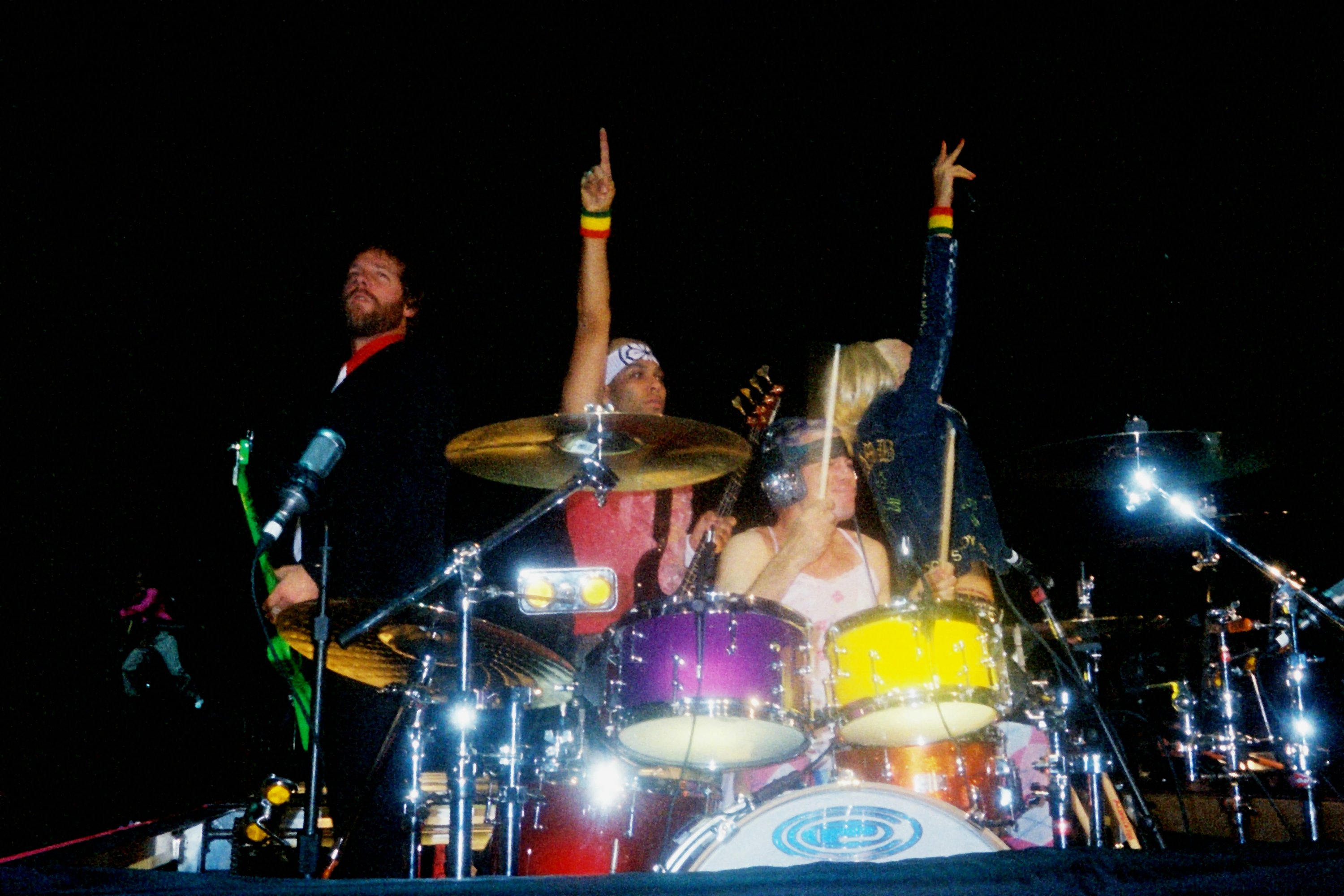
Ska punk band No Doubt performing in Worcester, Massachusetts, United States.

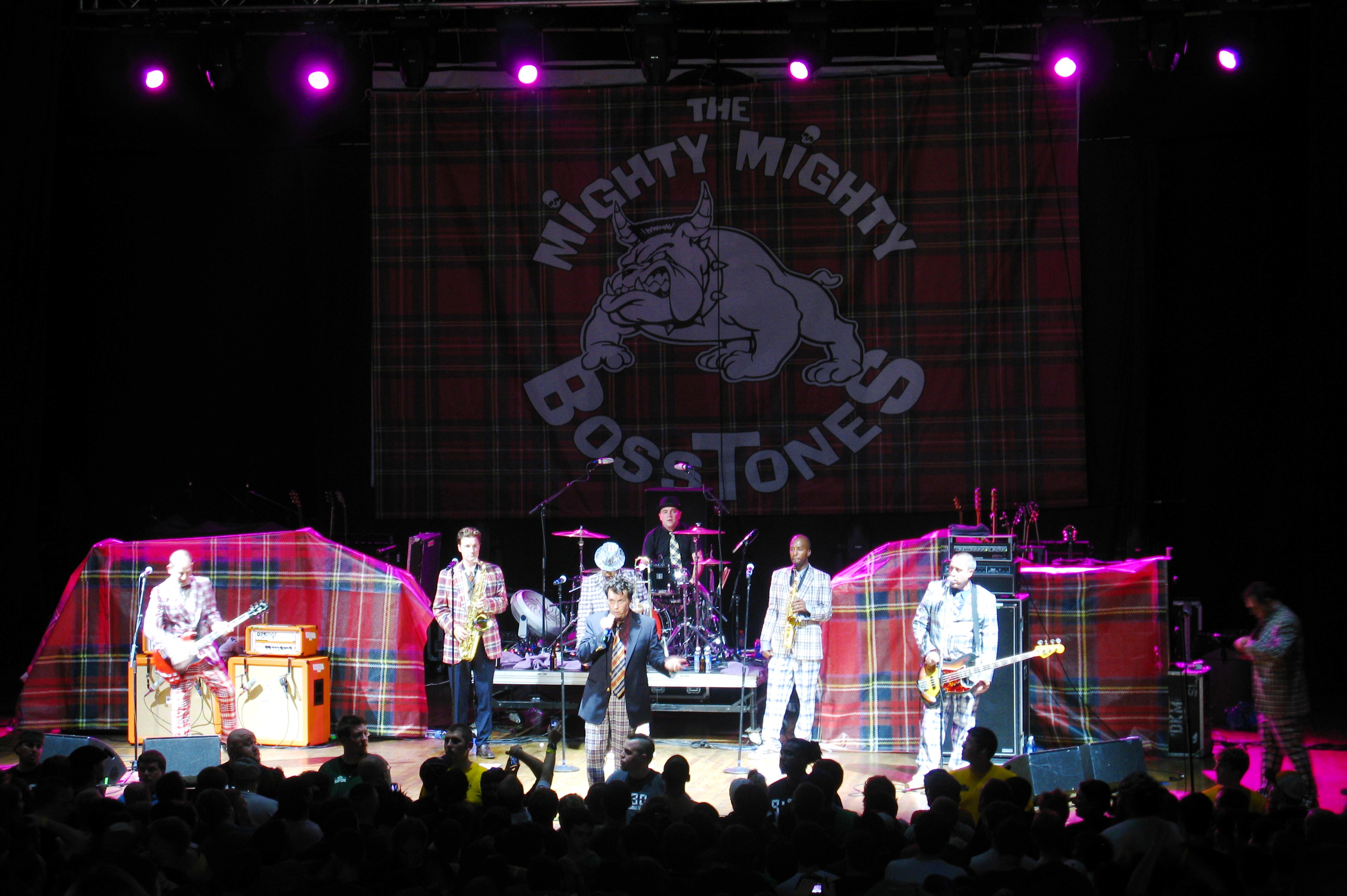
Ska punk band the Mighty Mighty Bosstones performing in 2008

=== Mainstream success (mid–late 1990s) ===
Ska punk broke into the mainstream in the mid-1990s with bands such as Sublime, No Doubt, Goldfinger, the Mighty Mighty Bosstones, Less Than Jake and Rancid all achieving mainstream success. Sublime's song "Date Rape" became a hit on major California alternative rock radio stations. However, Sublime did not reach its peak of popularity until 1996 with the release of the band's 1996 self-titled album, which was certified 5× platinum by the Recording Industry Association of America (RIAA) in 1999. Because of Sublime's popularity, the band's album 40oz. to Freedom was certified 2× platinum by the RIAA in 2005.

Another ska punk band that achieved mainstream success during the mid-late 1990s was No Doubt. No Doubt's 1995 album Tragic Kingdom was certified diamond by the RIAA in 1999 and was certified diamond by Music Canada in 1997. Tragic Kingdom sold at least 16,000,000 copies worldwide. Rancid's song "Time Bomb" peaked at number 48 on the Billboard Hot 100 Airplay chart and the band's 1995 album ...And Out Come the Wolves was certified platinum by the RIAA. Reel Big Fish's album Turn the Radio Off, which was released in August 1996, was certified gold by the RIAA in November 1997. Reel Big Fish's song "Sell Out" peaked at number 69 on the Billboard Hot 100 Airplay chart. Goldfinger's song "Here in Your Bedroom" peaked at number 47 on the Billboard Hot 100 Airplay chart. The Mighty Mighty Bosstones achieved mainstream success in 1997; their song "The Impression That I Get" peaked at number 23 on the Billboard Hot 100 Airplay chart, number 19 on the Mainstream Top 40 chart, and number 17 on the Adult Pop Songs chart. Also, the Mighty Mighty Bosstones' song "The Rascal King" peaked at number 68 on the Billboard Hot 100 Airplay chart. The Mighty Mighty Bosstones' album Let's Face It, which was released in March 1997, was certified platinum by the RIAA in September 1997. In 2000, Billboard wrote that according to Nielsen SoundScan, Let's Face It sold 1,700,000 copies.

=== Decline and revival (2000s–present) ===
Ska and reggae influenced rock music retreated to niche status by the 2000s, with many major acts, such as the Mighty Mighty Bosstones and Ska-P taking an extended hiatus, and chart success eluded most bands of the genre. Some acts continued to produce such music through the decade, spearheaded by groups from Southern California (the home of ska-punk pioneers Sublime) such as Slightly Stoopid, Long Beach Shortbus, Long Beach Dub Allstars, and Tribal Seeds. Chart success returned in 2018 when the Interrupters scored a minor hit with their song "She's Kerosene", that peaked at No. 4 on the Billboard Alternative Songs chart and No. 1 on the RPM Canadian rock/alternative chart. Detroit ska punk outfit the Suicide Machines released a new album titled "Revolution Spring", released in March 2020 on Fat Wreck Chords. The Planet Smashers released "Too Much Information" on Stomp Records in 2019 and continue to play shows in the U.S. and Canada. The duo 100 Gecs incorporated ska punk elements into their 2019 song "Stupid Horse" from their album 1000 Gecs, as well as throughout their album 10,000 Gecs, released in 2023.

Ann Arbor, Michigan–based ska punk band We Are the Union released "Self Care" in 2018 and tour frequently. Their trombone player, Jeremy Hunter, runs the YouTube channel called Skatune Network, where they post ska and ska punk covers of video game soundtracks, cartoon themes, pop punk, and other genres, garnering a significant international following online and releasing several albums. BrooklynVegan has written, "You can't talk about the renewed interest in ska without talking Jeremy Hunter". Buck-O-Nine released a new album titled: "Fundaymental" in 2019. Other artists that continue to tour or put out music on a regular basis include: Kill Lincoln, Chudson, Omnigone, Catbite, Big D and the Kids Table, Streetlight Manifesto (and by extension Bandits of the Acoustic Revolution), Five Iron Frenzy, Pilfers, Mad Caddies, Voodoo Glow Skulls, Joystick, Hans Gruber and the Die Hards, Mike Park's The Bruce Lee Band, Tape Girl, Poindexter, Noise Complaint, Skatsune Miku, Sad Snack, Monkey, Young Costello and the Interrupters.

== See also ==
- List of ska musicians
- Reggae rock
