= Hand Crushed by a Mallet (remix) =

2020 single by 100 Gecs featuring Fall Out Boy, Craig Owens and Nicole Dollanganger

"Hand Crushed by a Mallet" (remix)

Single by 100 Gecs featuring Fall Out Boy, Craig Owens and Nicole Dollanganger

from the album 1000 Gecs and the Tree of Clues
- Released: July 9, 2020
- Genre: Glitch; hyperpop; pop punk; electropop
- Length: 2:55
- Label: Dog Show; Big Beat; Atlantic

100 Gecs singles chronology
"Stupid Horse" (remix) (2020)	"Hand Crushed by a Mallet" (remix) (2020)	"Sympathy 4 the Grinch" (2020)

Fall Out Boy singles chronology
"Bob Dylan" (2019)	"Hand Crushed by a Mallet" (remix) (2020)	"Love from the Other Side" (2023)

Craig Owens singles chronology
"Life Long After Death" (2019)	"Hand Crushed by a Mallet" (remix) (2020)

Nicole Dollanganger singles chronology
"Alligator Blood" (Original Version) (2019)	"Hand Crushed by a Mallet" (remix) (2020)	"Whispering Glades" (2021)

Music video
- "Hand Crushed by a Mallet (remix)" on YouTube

"Hand Crushed by a Mallet" is a song by American experimental musical duo 100 Gecs from their debut studio album 1000 Gecs (2019). Its remix, included in the remix album 1000 Gecs and the Tree of Clues (2020), features vocals from American singer Patrick Stump of the rock band Fall Out Boy, American musician Craig Owens, vocalist of rock band Chiodos, and formerly D.R.U.G.S., and Canadian-American singer Nicole Dollanganger. After the remix album's release on July 10, the remix was released as the album's sixth single on August 20, 2020.

== Background ==
Following a meeting between Fall Out Boy member Pete Wentz and 100 gecs members Dylan Brady and Laura Les, Wentz asked the band if they wanted to work together, which was met with positive response. The duo later received a ZIP file of Patrick Stump singing the song's intro. Craig Owens and Nicole Dollanganger additionally provide vocals on the song, with Dollanganger singing the song's chorus and Owens performing the song's verses and outro.

== Music video ==
An animated music video for the "Hand Crushed by a Mallet" remix directed by Dario Alva and written by Weston Allen was released on August 20, 2020. The video begins with an anthropomorphic mushroom studying a key with a magnifying glass before a rat steals it, with the characters additionally appearing on the album's cover art. The plot then follows a cat and mouse chase, with the mushroom searching for the rat through "chaotic sets of checkered rooms and creepy forests". The video received praise for its heavy visual effects, described as "psychedelic clipping and intricate designs of the different fantastical characters" by The Fader.

== Personnel ==
Credits adapted from Tidal.

- 100 Gecs – lead artist, production
- Fall Out Boy – featured artist
- Craig Owens – featured artist
- Nicole Dollanganger – featured artist
- Sawce – guitar
- Mike Bozzi – mastering
- Dylan Brady – mixing
- Laura Les – mixing

== Charts ==
Weekly chart performance for "Hand Crushed by a Mallet (remix)"
Chart (2020)	Peak position
New Zealand Hot Singles (RMNZ)	39
US Hot Rock & Alternative Songs (Billboard)	23
