= Money Machine =

A money machine, or ATM (automatic teller machine), is used for withdrawing money from a bank account.

Money Machine may refer to:

- "Money Machine" (song), a song by 100 Gecs
- "Money Machine", a song from the 2 Chainz album Based on a T.R.U. Story
- Money Machine, an album by Bigelf
- The Money Machine, an American investment-advice television program that aired on TechTV
- "The Money Machine", an episode of Mission:Impossible (1966 series)
- "Moneymachine", a song by Ho99o9 from the album United States of Horror
- Money Machine: A Trailblazing American Venture in China, a book by Chinese businessman Shan Weijian

== See also ==
- Money booth, used for entertainment
