= Hollywood Baby =

- 12-inch vinyl cover

Single by 100 Gecs

from the album 10,000 Gecs
- Released: February 16, 2023
- Genre: Hyperpop
- Length: 3:07
- Label: Dog Show; Atlantic
- Songwriters: Dylan Brady; Laura Les

100 Gecs singles chronology
"Doritos & Fritos" (2022)	"Hollywood Baby" (2023)

"Hollywood Baby" is a song by the American hyperpop duo 100 Gecs. It was released on February 16, 2023, as the third and final single from their second studio album, 10,000 Gecs. It was named one of the best songs of 2023 by Billboard, i-D, Pitchfork, and Slant Magazine.

== Chart performance ==
Chart performance for "Hollywood Baby"
Chart (2023)	Peak position
US Hot Rock & Alternative Songs (Billboard)	37
US Rock & Alternative Airplay (Billboard)	46
US Alternative Airplay (Billboard)	18
