= Haunted (Laura Les song) =

Single by Laura Les
- Released: March 12, 2021
- Genre: Hyperpop
- Length: 1:42
- Label: Dog Show Records
- Songwriter: Laura Les
- Producer: Laura Les

Official music video
- "Haunted" on YouTube

"Haunted" is a song by the American musician Laura Les, released on March 12, 2021, as a non-album single. Les is a member of the duo 100 Gecs alongside Dylan Brady, and "Haunted" was her solo debut under her own name. It is an electro-pop-inspired hyperpop track, and critics found it had a general horror or spooky feel. It was accompanied by a Weston Allen-directed music video with the same vibe. "Haunted" later appeared on the HBO series Euphoria and was certified gold in the United States by the Recording Industry Association of America.

== Background and composition ==
Laura Les first began making solo music under the name osno1. She later became known as half of the duo 100 Gecs with Dylan Brady. "Haunted" was the first solo release by Les under her own name and following 100 gecs' popularity. She fully wrote and produced the song. Les described it as "mostly just about a feeling. Getting overwhelmed by a feeling and how it changes things around you." Musically, she was inspired by electro-pop.

The song was defined as hyperpop. Matt Moen of Paper described it as "a flurry of giddy electro-pop and hair-thrashing emo". Tom Breihan of Stereogum said that it blends trance, SoundCloud rap, and nü metal, adding that it resembled the duo Crystal Castles had they been "extremely silly". Steffanee Wang of Nylon found the beat reminiscent of Grimes. According to Them, "Haunted" "starts out with sweet, candy-like nightcore synth plinks, until a frantic chorus of her shrieks suddenly heightens the song's tension." Aneesa Ahed of Mixmag described it as "[h]igh-tempo and full of angst and edge". Moen said that the track has a horror vibe, while Them writers said that Les blends cuteness and spookiness.

== Release and reception ==
"Haunted" was first played at the A2B2 Night of Fire virtual festival, where Les played solo. After fan requests, it was released as a single on March 12, 2021, through Dog Show Records. A music video was released the same day, directed by Weston Allen. Thom Waite of Dazed described the video as "characteristically chaotic", while Stephen Ackroyd of Dork and Allie Gregory of Exclaim! wrote that it is "fittingly spooky". "Haunted" was featured in "Out of Touch", the second episode of season two of the HBO series Euphoria. Following this, the song appeared at number 6 on Billboard's Tunefind-powered Top TV Songs chart for January 2022. Mixmag named it one of the best songs that had appeared on the series. In 2025, it was certified gold in the United States by the Recording Industry Association of America, with 500,000 certified units.

== Track listing ==
Single – Streaming

- "Haunted" — 1:42

== Certifications ==
Region	Certification	Certified units/sales
United States (RIAA)	Gold	500,000^{‡}
^{‡} Sales+streaming figures based on certification alone.
