= Cake Pop =

American electronic music group

- Origin: St. Louis, Missouri
- Genres: Experimental pop; Hyperpop
- Years active: 2015–present
- Label: Mad Decent
- Members: Dylan Brady; Ravenna Golden; Cali Cartier; Lewis Grant; Kevin Bedford; Pritty; Adam Newcomer; Robel Ketema

Cake Pop is an American experimental pop band pioneered by Dylan Brady. Other members of the group include Ravenna Golden, Cali Cartier, Lewis Grant, Kevin Bedford, Pritty, Adam Newcomer, and Robel Ketema.

== Career ==
=== 2015: CAKE POP and "Sticky Fingers" ===
The band released their self-titled debut EP on August 25, 2015, for streaming. CAKE POP is also available for direct download through MediaFire. Spanning six tracks and clocking in at 14 minutes, the project includes a guest appearance from Canadian rapper Night Lovell as well as guest production from Five Star Hotel. On Apple Music, the project includes a bonus, seventh track titled "757 Remix" that features The Kid Devo, bringing the total run time over 16 minutes.

Soon after the release of CAKE POP, on January 25, 2016, the group would proceed to drop the single "Sticky Fingers" alongside a music video starring Lewis Grant and Dylan Brady. This track is produced by both Laura Les (under the pseudonym osno1) and Brady, the duo that would eventually join forces to become hyperpop's critically-acclaimed 100 gecs.

=== 2021: Cake Pop 2 ===
Following a period of silence that spanned nearly six years, Cake Pop returned on March 30, 2021, releasing the single "Black Rum" with a music video directed by Weston Allen and produced by Mood Killer. The video includes the members of Cake Pop in food-themed costumes designed by Elly Golterman, with Lewis Grant as a grape bunch, Ravenna Golden as a birthday cake, Dylan Brady as a lobster, Cali Cartier as a broccoli floret, Kevin Bedford as a piece of popcorn, and Pritty as a wedge of cheese. Subsequently, Cake Pop announced their second project Cake Pop 2 on the group's official Twitter account, initially set to release on May 14, 2021. However, the release of the project was ultimately moved up by two weeks.

On April 20, 2021, Cake Pop released a single titled "Satin Bedsheets" accompanied by a livestream of a birthday cake, a wedge of cheese, and a broccoli floret. A music video for "Satin Bedsheets" released 8 days later on April 28, 2021. In the video, Cake Pop members returned in the costumes from the preceding music video, maneuvering puppets that reflect each of the costumes.

Less than two weeks later, on April 30, 2021, Cake Pop 2 was released, spanning ten tracks with a total duration surpassing 20 minutes. Merchandise for the album was made available for purchase through THE HYV, including a vinyl record and two t-shirts designed by Mikey Joyce: one of the band members in their food costumes and the other of the band's logo.

== Discography ==
=== Studio albums ===
Title	Details
Cake Pop 2	Released: April 30, 2021; Label: Mad Decent; Formats: Digital download, streaming

=== Extended plays ===
Title	Details
CAKE POP	Released: 2015; Formats: Digital download, streaming

=== Singles ===
Title	Year	Album
"Sticky Fingers"	2016	Non-album single
"Black Rum"	2021	Cake Pop 2
"Satin Bedsheets"	2021	Cake Pop 2
