= 100 Gecs tree =

Tree in Illinois, US

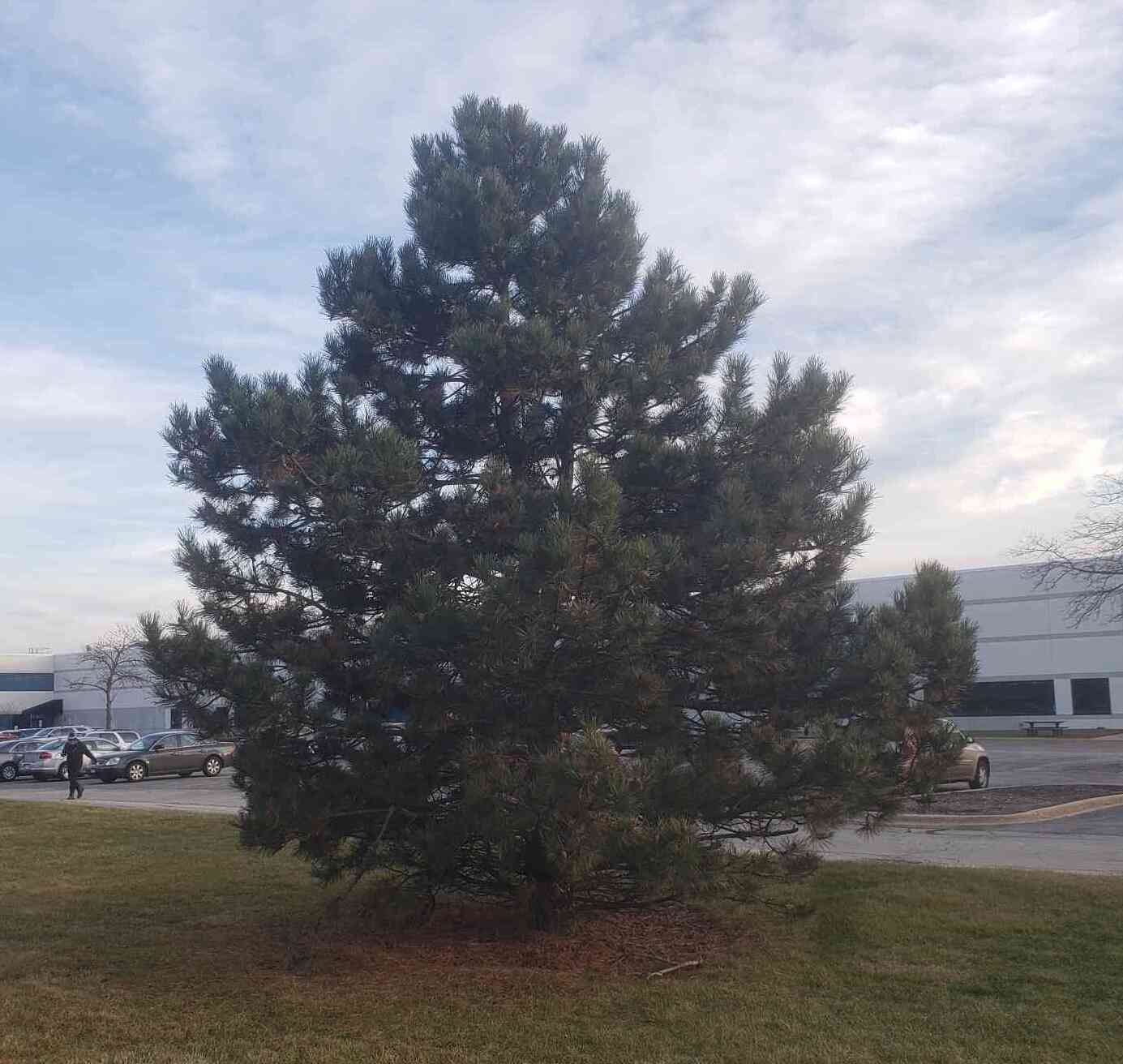
- The 100 gecs tree in 2024
- Interactive map of 100 Gecs tree
- Species: Ponderosa pine (Pinus ponderosa)
- Location: 543 E Algonquin Rd, Des Plaines, Illinois, United States
- Coordinates: 42°01′49″N 87°54′44″W
- Custodian: Juno Lighting

The 100 Gecs tree (nicknamed Gecca) is a ponderosa pine located in Des Plaines, Illinois, in the United States. It was featured in the cover art for the 2019 album 1000 Gecs by the American musical duo 100 Gecs; the tree has since become a popular attraction for fans.

== History ==
The American duo 100 Gecs released their debut album 1000 Gecs in 2019. The album's cover art featured the duo from nearby Chicago with heads bowed towards the tree and facing away from the camera. The coordinates of the tree were later identified on Google Maps, leading to numerous fans of the band making "pilgrimages" to the tree.

=== Fan pilgrimage ===
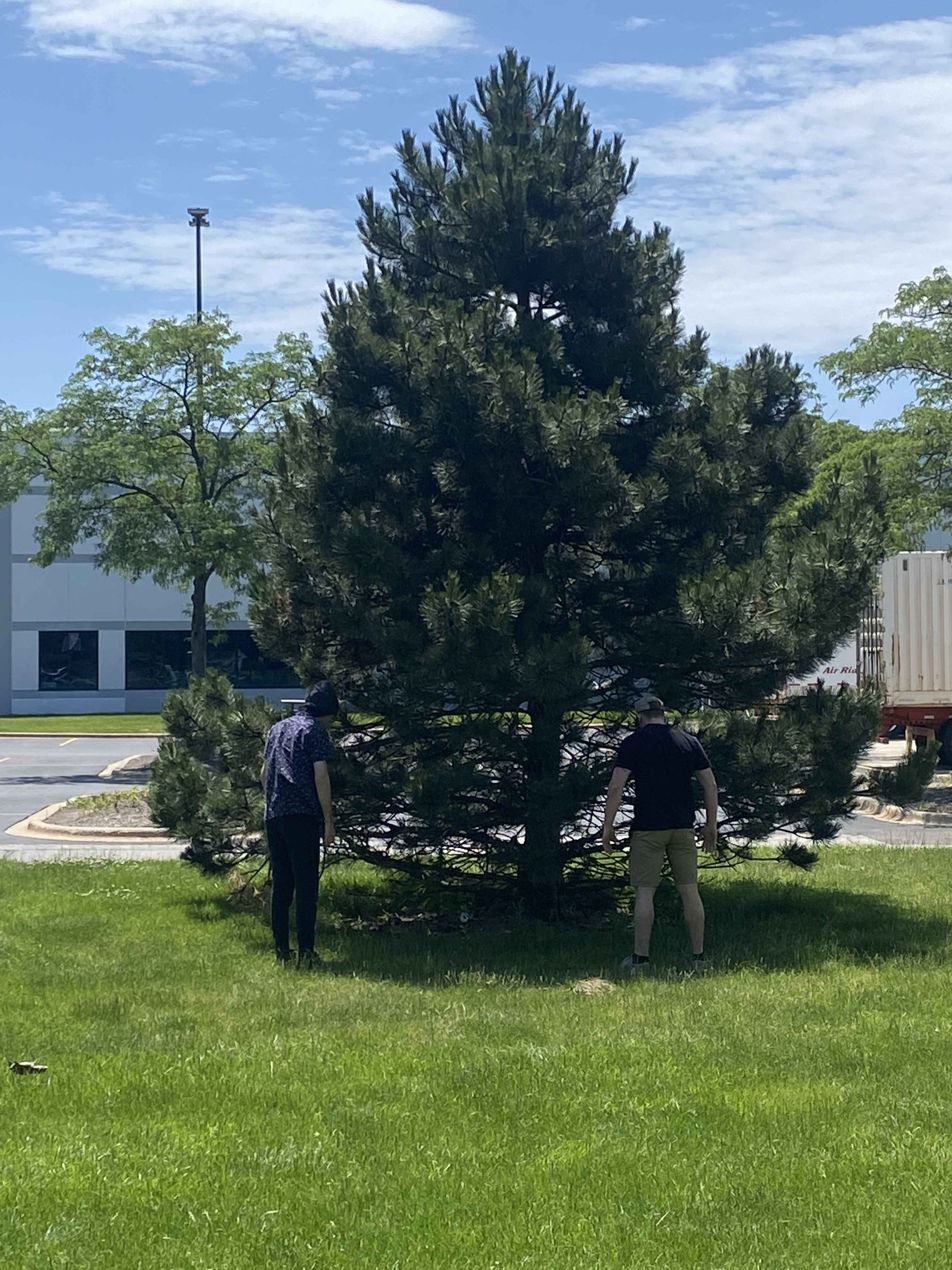
Two people imitating the cover art of 1000 gecs

As of 2020, the tree was listed as a 4.9-star "place of worship" with hundreds of reviews on Google Maps and an "art museum" on Yelp. Fans who visited the tree often left offerings, including Monster Energy cans, cigarettes, pregnancy tests, a plunger, and "other pop culture detritus". Connections were drawn between the tree and the American Football House, both musical pilgrimage sites and "mundane things in the middle of Illinois".

== Controversy ==
The tree is located on private property as part of an office complex in Des Plaines owned by a subsidiary of Acuity Brands. Security guards for the complex have asked visitors to expedite their visits and not leave any items behind. An online rumor circulated that the tree might be cut down by the complex's maintenance team due to frustration at the number of fans intruding on the property and littering but this was denied by a facilities manager for the property.

== See also ==
- American Football House
