= 10,000 Gecs =

Studio album by 100 Gecs
- Released: March 17, 2023
- Recorded: 2021
- Genre: Hyperpop; pop punk; electronic rock; ska
- Length: 26:53
- Label: Dog Show; Atlantic
- Producer: Dylan Brady; Laura Les

100 Gecs chronology
Snake Eyes (2022)	10,000 Gecs (2023)

Singles from 10,000 gecs
- 1. "MeMeMe" Released: November 19, 2021; 2. "Doritos & Fritos" Released: April 12, 2022; 3. "Hollywood Baby" Released: February 16, 2023

10,000 Gecs (/ˈtɛn ˈθaʊzənd ˈɡɛks/) is the second studio album by American hyperpop duo 100 Gecs, as well as their first release on a major label - Atlantic Records. It was released on March 17, 2023, through Dog Show and Atlantic after several delays and a 2021 promotional tour. The album is a follow-up to their debut album 1000 Gecs (2019) and the remix album 1000 Gecs and the Tree of Clues (2020). It was supported by the pre-release of three singles: "MeMeMe", "Doritos & Fritos", and "Hollywood Baby".

== Background ==
On July 13, 2021, 100 gecs announced the 10,000 gecs Tour. The 34-date tour ran from October 8 to December 9, 2021. On this tour, the duo performed the then-unreleased songs "MeMeMe", "Hollywood Baby", "757", "Billy Knows Jamie", "One Million Dollars", "Hey Big Man", "Fallen 4 Ü", and "What's That Smell?".

On September 6, 2021, they officially announced the album and revealed its cover art. The cover photograph was taken on the bridge carrying Garden Grove Boulevard over the Santa Ana River in Orange, California. On October 7, they announced the album would release in early 2022. On November 19, they officially released "MeMeMe" as the album's first single, with an accompanying music video on the same day. The album would ultimately miss the initial "early 2022" release window; however its second single, "Doritos & Fritos", was released on April 12, 2022. An accompanying music video for the song was released the following month on May 16. The duo also played another new song, "I Got My Tooth Removed", at some of their concerts during that year.

On December 2, 2022, the duo released an EP titled Snake Eyes, which included the previously performed "Hey Big Man" as well as two other songs. The same day, the duo officially announced that after much delay, 10,000 gecs would release on March 17, 2023, and launched pre-orders for the album. On February 16, 2023, they released the album's third single "Hollywood Baby", along with the album's track listing.

== Critical reception ==
Professional ratings
Aggregate scores
Source	Rating
Any Decent Music	7.4/10
Metacritic	81/100
Review scores
Source	Rating
AllMusic	4/5 stars
DIY	4.5/5 stars
The Guardian	4/5 stars
NME	5/5 stars
Pitchfork	8.2/10
PopMatters	7/10
Slant	4/5 stars
The Sydney Morning Herald	4.5/5 stars

According to the review aggregator Metacritic, 10,000 gecs received "universal acclaim" based on a weighted average score of 81 out of 100 from fifteen critic scores. The review aggregator Any Decent Music gave the album a weighted average score of 7.4 out of 10 from eighteen critic scores.

Writing for PopMatters, John Amen noted, "The duo reaffirm their status as hyperpop ambassadors while implementing a notable mainstream savvy, including memorable beats, hook-ish melodies, and vocals that epitomize an au courant slacker vibe." Reviewing the album for AllMusic, Fred Thomas suggested that it, "expands the duo's cultural collaging to include cannibalizations of Limp Bizkit-style nu-metal, pop-punk, '90s alt-funk, ska, and anything else that captures the gecs' fleeting attention." Upon concluding the article, Thomas also claimed that, "Somehow 100 gecs take things even more over the top on 10,000 Gecs than they did on their already mind-boggling debut. The very nature of the group's hyperbolic and perpetually exploding design means they're still inherently polarizing, love-it-or-hate-it kind of music. For those who love it, 10,000 Gecs offers more – so much more, always more – to love."

Reviewing 10,000 Gecs for The Sydney Morning Herald, Robert Moran wrote that the duo had not been tamed by signing to a major label or feeling the pressure to follow up the "free-form fluke" of their debut. Deeming it to be perhaps "the weirdest major label release" since Ween's Pure Guava (1992), Moran wrote that "10,000 Gecs is hilariously extreme, a nutty and unbridled celebration of pop culture detritus befitting the synaptic overload of our perennially online era. More than that, it’s proof once again that there’s no one like 100 Gecs."

In June 2023, Alternative Press published an unranked list of the top 25 albums of the year to date and included this release, calling it "10 times more ludicrous than its precursor" with "the raging moshpit of nü metal, cyberpop, emo-rap, ska, and punk that somehow wrestled mainstream critics onto their side of the joke".

=== Year-end lists ===
Select year-end rankings of 10,000 gecs
Critic/Publication	List	Rank	Ref.
Exclaim!	Exclaim!'s 50 Best Albums of 2023	12	
Pitchfork	The 50 Best Albums of 2023	18	
NME	The best albums of 2023	14	
Rolling Stone	The 100 Best Albums of 2023	74	
Stereogum	The 50 Best Albums of 2023	10	

== Appearances in other media ==
In April 2023, a few days after the album released, Twitter and TikTok users noticed that the cable news station Fox News was playing the track "The Most Wanted Person in the United States" during an outro segment. In May 2023, Fox News anchor Greg Gutfeld stated that 100 gecs were "the best new band out there", as well as mentioning various other newer music groups such as Death Grips. Many fans noticed the irony between Fox News' frequent anti-LGBT messaging, and Les being a transgender woman herself.

The track “Hollywood Baby” appears in multiple video games including NHL 24 and Tony Hawk's Pro Skater 3 + 4.

== Track listing ==
All tracks are written by Dylan Brady and Laura Les.

10,000 Gecs track listing
No.	Title	Length
1.	"Dumbest Girl Alive"	2:17
2.	"757"	2:06
3.	"Hollywood Baby"	3:07
4.	"Frog on the Floor"	2:41
5.	"Doritos & Fritos"	3:16
6.	"Billy Knows Jamie"	2:43
7.	"One Million Dollars"	2:00
8.	"The Most Wanted Person in the United States"	2:35
9.	"I Got My Tooth Removed"	3:17
10.	"mememe"	2:46
Total length:		26:53

Notes

- Physical copies of the album contain different versions of "757" and "Billy Knows Jamie" than on digital releases.
- "The Most Wanted Person in the United States" was originally known as "Real Killer".
- "MeMeMe" is stylized in lowercase.

== Personnel ==
100 gecs

- Dylan Brady – production (all tracks), vocals (tracks 2–6, 8–10)
- Laura Les – production (all tracks), vocals (1–6, 8–10), guitar (1, 3–7, 9, 10)

Additional musicians

- Josh Freese – drums (3, 5–7, 9)
- DJ Final – scratching (6)
- Gabriel Steiner – trumpet (9)
- Alex Csillag – trombone (9)
- Aaron Leibowitz – saxophone (9)

Technical

- Chris Gehringer – mastering
- Mark "Spike" Stent – mixing (1, 4)
- Jeff Ellis – mixing (2, 3, 5–10)

Artwork

- Chris Maggio – creative direction, photography
- Tracy Ma – graphic design
- Mira Joyce – logo
- Elly Golterman – costume designer

== Charts ==
Chart performance for 10,000 Gecs
Chart (2023)	Peak position
Australian Albums (ARIA)	89
Hungarian Albums (MAHASZ)	17
UK Album Downloads (Official Charts)	49
US Billboard 200	59
US Top Rock & Alternative Albums (Billboard)	10
US Indie Store Album Sales (Billboard)	6
