= Snake Eyes (EP) =

EP by 100 Gecs
- Released: December 2, 2022
- Genre: Hyperpop; Experimental; Electronic
- Length: 6:04
- Label: Dog Show; Atlantic
- Producer: Dylan Brady; Laura Les

100 Gecs chronology
1000 Gecs and the Tree of Clues (2020)	Snake Eyes (2022)	10,000 Gecs (2023)

Snake Eyes is the second extended play by American hyperpop duo 100 Gecs. It was surprise-released on December 2, 2022, through Dog Show Records. To coincide with the EP's release, pre-orders for the duo's second album, 10,000 Gecs were made available. As part of 2024's Record Store Day, the EP was pressed onto a picture disc.

== Release ==
Snake Eyes was released on December 2, 2022 without any prior announcement. It was the first major release from the duo since their debut album 1000 Gecs, and its remix album. On the same day of the EP's release, an announcement was made on the duo's social media confirming the release date of their new album, 10,000 gecs, for March 17, 2023. Pre-orders for the album were also made available on the same day.

On February 15, 2024 the duo announced that Snake Eyes would be pressed onto a "weed-shaped" picture disc, to coincide with 2024's Record Store Day. The record was made available for purchase on April 20, 2024.

== Reception ==
Professional ratings
Review scores
Source	Rating
Pitchfork	5.6/10

Snake Eyes received mostly positive reviews from critics. Reviewing "Hey Big Man", Pitchfork writer Reanna Cruz called the track "still quintessentially gecs", "feral and juvenile" and that it "[stayed] true to their delightfully irreverent ethos." Sarah Kearns from Hypebeast called the EP "exhilaratingly chaotic". Rolling Stone writer Jon Blistein noted that "Hey Big Man" had become "a staple of Gecs' live set" and said the EP would "certainly help satiate fans".

Writing for EDM, Nick Yopko noted that "Hey Big Man" was a "chaotic" song and one that would "surely perk up their already high-energy live shows". He also commented that the track "[channeled] Beastie Boys". Yopko went on, calling "Torture Me" a "catchy, upbeat track" and that it "lets you feel how much fun the trio had in the studio". He also called the vocals on "Runaway" "emotive" and said they talked about "realizing you don't need someone who's holding you back." Paper writer Kenna McCafferty commented that each track put a "post-ironic twist on the classic 100 gecs sound". She went on to note that the EP featured a "even more raucous sound".

Other critics had a more negative view of the EP. Reviewing Snake Eyes in its entirety for Pitchfork, Joshua Minsoo Kim called the EP "inconsequential" and that it "repeatedly comes up short". He also noted that the EP "doesn't capture the spark of 1000 gecs or anything thereafter".

== Track listing ==
All tracks are written by Dylan Brady and Laura Les.

No.	Title	Length
1.	"Hey Big Man"	1:42
2.	"Torture Me" (featuring Skrillex)	1:53
3.	"Runaway"	2:28
Total length:		6:04
