= Money Machine (song) =

Single by 100 Gecs

from the album 1000 Gecs
- Released: May 29, 2019
- Recorded: January 2019
- Genre: Hyperpop; electropop
- Length: 1:54
- Label: Dog Show
- Songwriters: Dylan Brady; Laura Les
- Producers: Dylan Brady; Laura Les

100 Gecs singles chronology
"Money Machine" (2019)	"745 Sticky (Injury Reserve Remix)" (2019)

"Money Machine" (stylized in lowercase) is the debut single by American hyperpop duo 100 Gecs. It was released on May 29, 2019, as the only single from their debut studio album, 1000 Gecs (2019).

== Production and release ==
100 Gecs is a duo made up of Laura Les and Dylan Brady. "Money Machine" was produced some time after the release of their debut EP 100 Gecs, because they were interested in returning with the project. Brady started the project, creating the melody on Logic Pro. Les thought the instrumental was "sarcastic", as if the bass was "laughing at you". She recorded "a hilarious burst of trash talk" after fighting with men and after a day of working at her job. Les explained: "I had been watching a lot of King of the Hill, and I constructed in my head a sort of Hank Hill asshole character to just absolutely break down. I was just kind of getting into that sort of mindset of these people that I'd grown up with, these people in St. Louis talking about their big trucks." About the song title, Brady said that he gets inspiration for song titles from objects; "must have been some money on the ground".

A remix by A. G. Cook was released on October 23, 2019, as the lead single off of their first remix album 1000 Gecs and the Tree of Clues.

== Composition ==
In "a whiny chipmunk voice", the song opens with the lyrics "Hey you lil piss baby / You think you're so fucking cool, huh? / You think you're so fucking tough / You talk a lotta big game for someone with such a small truck", "[scanning] as pure chest-puffing braggadocio [and containing] one of the most appealingly strange taunts in recent memory", and then goes into a chorus "of scraping power chords that are kind of like a cross between Skrillex and Sophie. It's bizarre, a bit silly, but for the exact same reason, endlessly fascinating." DIY described it as a "glitchy electronic-pop banger", and Pitchfork described it as "pulsing [and] cavity-inducing".

== Music video ==
On June 13, 2019, an official music video for the song was released. The music video has Brady and Les as "badass rapper-types mugging for the camera" as they step into a parking lot with some "rather large trucks", and distorted by layers of visual effects. According to Paper, "[t]he overall effect exists somewhere between a cybernetic hallucination and a deep fried meme. It's hard to pinpoint what is exactly so damn appealing about the video, but perhaps it's for that exact same reason that it's so damn entertaining."

== Reception and legacy ==
Pitchfork named it the 61st best song of 2019. Sasha Geffen, for the same website, wrote that the song "is a purification ritual for the rotted-out brain, a seething, monstrous prayer to burn the slime away". It was also named one of the best songs of the year by Dazed Fact, Rolling Stone, and Vice. According to The New York Times, the music video for "Money Machine" helped 100 Gecs get a burst of attention. It was included on Vulture's list of "9 Songs That Wouldn't Exist Without Sophie". The Forty-Five's Sophie Walker named it the third best hyperpop song of all time.

== Charts ==
Chart (2020)	Peak position
US Hot Rock & Alternative Songs (Billboard)	47
