= Cake Pop 2 =

Studio album by Cake Pop
- Released: April 30, 2021
- Genre: Hyperpop; experimental pop; happy hardcore; alt-rap
- Length: 20:04
- Label: Mad Decent
- Producer: Cali Cartier; Dylan Brady; Paul Judge

Cake Pop chronology
| Cake Pop (2015) | Cake Pop 2 (2021) |

Singles from Cake Pop 2
- 1. "Black Rum" Released: March 30, 2021; 2. "Satin Bedsheets" Released: April 20, 2021

Cake Pop 2 is the debut studio album by American band Cake Pop, consisting of Dylan Brady, Ravenna Golden, Cali Cartier, Lewis Grant, Kevin Bedford, Pritty, Adam Newcomer, and Robel Ketema. The album is the sequel to their 2015 self-titled EP, and was released on April 30, 2021, by Mad Decent. It was promoted by the singles "Black Rum" and "Satin Bedsheets".

== Composition ==
Cake Pop 2 is a hyperpop, experimental pop, happy hardcore, and alt-rap album with elements of dancehall, trance, and EDM.

== Critical reception ==
Professional ratings
Review scores
| Source | Rating |
|---|---|
| The Forty-Five | 7.9/10 |
| Pitchfork | 6.7/10 |

Sophie Walker, writing for The Forty-Five called the album "fun" but lacking creativity, saying "If Cake Pop only wanted to push the envelope just that little bit further to find new, uncharted territory in an increasingly rigid hyperpop universe – and to have fun doing it – then Cake Pop 2 truly is a thing of great, rowdy, ridiculous beauty." Joshua Bote of Pitchfork called the album "a lively introduction to Cake Pop and its members, but as the sounds of Brady's busy schedule leak in, there's a sense that we've heard most of it before. Though the production flexes to fit the eccentricities of each song, the tailoring could have been closer."

== Track listing ==
All tracks produced by Dylan Brady, except when noted.

Cake Pop 2 track listing
| No. | Title | Writer(s) | Producer(s) | Length |
|---|---|---|---|---|
| 1. | "Black Rum" | Dylan Brady; Adam Newcomer; Lewis Grant; Ravenna Golden | | 2:27 |
| 2. | "Cake Happy" | Brady; Grant; Golden | | 1:53 |
| 3. | "Whistle" | Brady; Grant; Calvin James Lewis | Brady; Cali Cartier | 1:13 |
| 4. | "Magic" | Brady; Lewis | | 1:44 |
| 5. | "Ether" | Brady; Golden | Brady; Cartier | 1:32 |
| 6. | "Candy Floss" | Brady; Grant | | 2:04 |
| 7. | "Satin Bedsheets" | Brady; Lewis; Devon Nunez; Golden | | 1:48 |
| 8. | "Boom" | Brady; Elly Golterman; Jesse Rutherford; Grant; Paul Judge; Golden | Brady; Judge | 2:09 |
| 9. | "Pombachu" | Brady; Grant; Robel Ketema | | 2:20 |
| 10. | "Almost Famous" | Brady; Grant; Golden | | 2:54 |
| Total length: | | | | 20:05 |
