= 1000 Gecs and the Tree of Clues =

2020 remix album by 100 Gecs

Remix album by 100 Gecs
- Released: July 10, 2020
- Recorded: 2018–2020
- Genre: Hyperpop
- Length: 51:10; 41:38 (Vinyl)
- Labels: Dog Show; Big Beat; Atlantic
- Producers: Dylan Brady; Laura Les

100 Gecs chronology
1000 Gecs (2019)	1000 Gecs and the Tree of Clues (2020)	Snake Eyes (2022)

Singles from 1000 Gecs and the Tree of Clues
- 1. "Money Machine (A. G. Cook remix)" Released: October 23, 2019; 2. "745 Sticky (Injury Reserve remix)" Released: November 6, 2019; 3. "Ringtone (remix)" Released: February 24, 2020; 4. "Gec 2 Ü (remix)" Released: April 10, 2020; 5. "Stupid Horse (remix)" Released: May 22, 2020; 6. "Hand Crushed by a Mallet (remix)" Released: August 20, 2020

1000 Gecs and the Tree of Clues (/ˈwʌn ˈθaʊzənd ˈɡɛks ... /) is the first remix album by American experimental music duo 100 Gecs, released on July 10, 2020, by Dog Show Records, Big Beat Records and Atlantic Records. It features remixed and reworked versions of songs from their debut studio album 1000 Gecs (2019), as well as live performances and previously unreleased songs which were played at their Mine Gala 2019 set. The album features collaborations with numerous acts, such as Charli XCX, Kero Kero Bonito, Rico Nasty, Fall Out Boy, Tommy Cash, Hannah Diamond, Black Dresses and Dorian Electra. The album debuted at number 198 on the US Billboard 200, making it their first entry on the chart.

== Background and promotion ==
Initially, the duo was never planning to release a remix album, but they were motivated to do so after seeing the remixes others made after they released the stems to 1000 Gecs. In late 2019 it was announced that 100 Gecs was working on a remix album, then-titled 1000 Gecs & Th3 Phant0m M3nac3. In January 2020, 100 Gecs member Laura Les announced that the album would be re-titled, and the new title, 1000 Gecs & The Tree of Clues was announced in February 2020. The album was finally made available for pre-order on July 3, 2020.

=== Singles ===
A remix of "Money Machine" by British producer A. G. Cook was released as the album's first single on October 23, 2019, and was described as "a tripped-out chipmunk-emo-trap anthem". A remix of "745 Sticky" by American hip hop group Injury Reserve was released as November 6, 2019. This remix transforms "the original's bubblegummy assault in to a glitchy creep"

"Ringtone (remix)" was released on February 24, 2020, alongside a "visualizer" music video and features vocals from British singer Charli XCX, British indie pop band Kero Kero Bonito, and American rapper Rico Nasty. Charli XCX's verse in particular was praised for its catchiness. "Gec 2 Ü (Remix)" featuring vocals from American singer-songwriter Dorian Electra, was released on April 10, 2020. A music video, filmed in quarantine, followed on April 20, 2020.

"Stupid Horse (Remix)" featuring British singer GFOTY and DJ Count Baldor was released on May 22, 2020, alongside an animated music video. The remix swaps out the ska-influenced guitars of the original for a "shredder-like synths" described as a "Blink-182 and Sleigh Bells mashup on the verge of implosion."

== Reception ==
Professional ratings
Aggregate scores
Source	Rating
AnyDecentMusic?	7.5/10
Metacritic	81/100
Review scores
Source	Rating
AllMusic	3.5/5 stars
DIY	4.5/5 stars
Exclaim!	7/10
The Line of Best Fit	8/10
NME	4/5 stars
Our Culture Mag	4/5 stars
Pitchfork	7.9/10
PopMatters	8/10

1000 gecs and the Tree of Clues received critical acclaim. At Metacritic, which assigns a normalized rating out of 100 to reviews from mainstream critics, the album has an average score of 81 out of 100 based on 7 reviews, indicating "universal acclaim".

Ben Jolley of NME praised the album for its "infectious absurdity" and for the diverse array of features, both mainstream and underground, summarising it as "an exhilarating snapshot of pop's alternative future." The Line of Best Fit's Erin Bashford called it "consistently inconsistent" and "a bit of a difficult listen for those not wholeheartedly throwing themselves into the fray," but concluded that "if you want to venture into the abyss, there's a decent amount to marvel at." Ian Gormely, writing for Exclaim!, described the record as "sonic grab bag" but also "a strong rebuke to those who have dismissed the duo as a joke or dilettantes." Pitchfork editor Cat Zhang argued that the remixes make "some of its originals sound like demos," adding that "the guests skillfully mold the originals into creations of their own, while still preserving some of the songs' initial ideas."

The album has been described as "genre-blending" and features elements of experimental electronica, lo-fi, EDM, dubstep, pop punk, Eurodance, industrial, country, R&B, nu metal, screamo, bubblegum pop, rock, hip hop, emo, trap, pop rap, and indie pop.

== Track listing ==
All song titles stylized in all lowercase.

Vinyl edition
No.	Title	Writer(s)	Length
1.	"Money Machine" (A. G. Cook remix)	Dylan Brady; Laura Les	3:12
2.	"Ringtone" (remix) (featuring Charli XCX, Kero Kero Bonito, and Rico Nasty)	Brady; Les; Charlotte Aitchison; Gus Lobban; Sarah Perry; Maria Kelly	3:34
3.	"745 Sticky" (Injury Reserve remix)	Brady; Les; Corey Parker; Jordan Groggs; Nathaniel Ritchie	3:32
4.	"Gec 2 Ü" (Danny L Harle Harlecore remix)	Brady; Les	2:28
5.	"Hand Crushed by a Mallet" (remix) (featuring Fall Out Boy, Craig Owens, and Nicole Dollanganger)	Brady; Les	2:55
6.	"800db Cloud" (Ricco Harver remix)	Brady; Les	1:43
7.	"Stupid Horse" (remix) (featuring GFOTY and Count Baldor)	Brady; Les; Polly Salmon; Thomas William Parker	2:12
8.	"Ringtone" (umru remix)	Brady; Les	3:45
9.	"xXXi_wud_nvrstøp_ÜXXx" (remix) (featuring Tommy Cash and Hannah Diamond)	Brady; Les; Tomas Tammemets	4:31
10.	"745 Sticky" (Black Dresses remix)	Brady; Les	2:51
11.	"GecGecGec" (remix) (featuring Lil West and Tony Velour)	Brady; Les; Jhaisiah Everidge; Semaj Grant	2:08
12.	"xXXi_wud_nvrstøp_ÜXXx" (99jakes remix)	Brady; Les	3:21
13.	"Gec 2 Ü" (remix) (featuring Dorian Electra)	Brady; Les; Dorian Gomberg	2:46
14.	"Hand Crushed by a Mallet" (N0THANKY0U remix)	Brady; Les	2:40
Total length:			41:38

Digital edition
No.	Title	Writer(s)	Length
15.	"Came to My Show" (Intro)	Brady; Les	0:33
16.	"Came to My Show"	Brady; Les	2:20
17.	"Toothless"	Brady; Les; Marshmello	2:37
18.	"Small Pipe" (Live at FishCenter)	Brady; Les	1:19
19.	"800db Cloud" (Live at FishCenter)	Brady; Les	2:43
Total length:			51:10

== Charts ==
Chart (2020)	Peak position
US Billboard 200	198
US Heatseekers Albums (Billboard)	3
US Top Alternative Albums (Billboard)	12
US Top Current Album Sales (Billboard)	87
US Indie Store Album Sales (Billboard)	21
