= 100 Gecs =

American musical duo

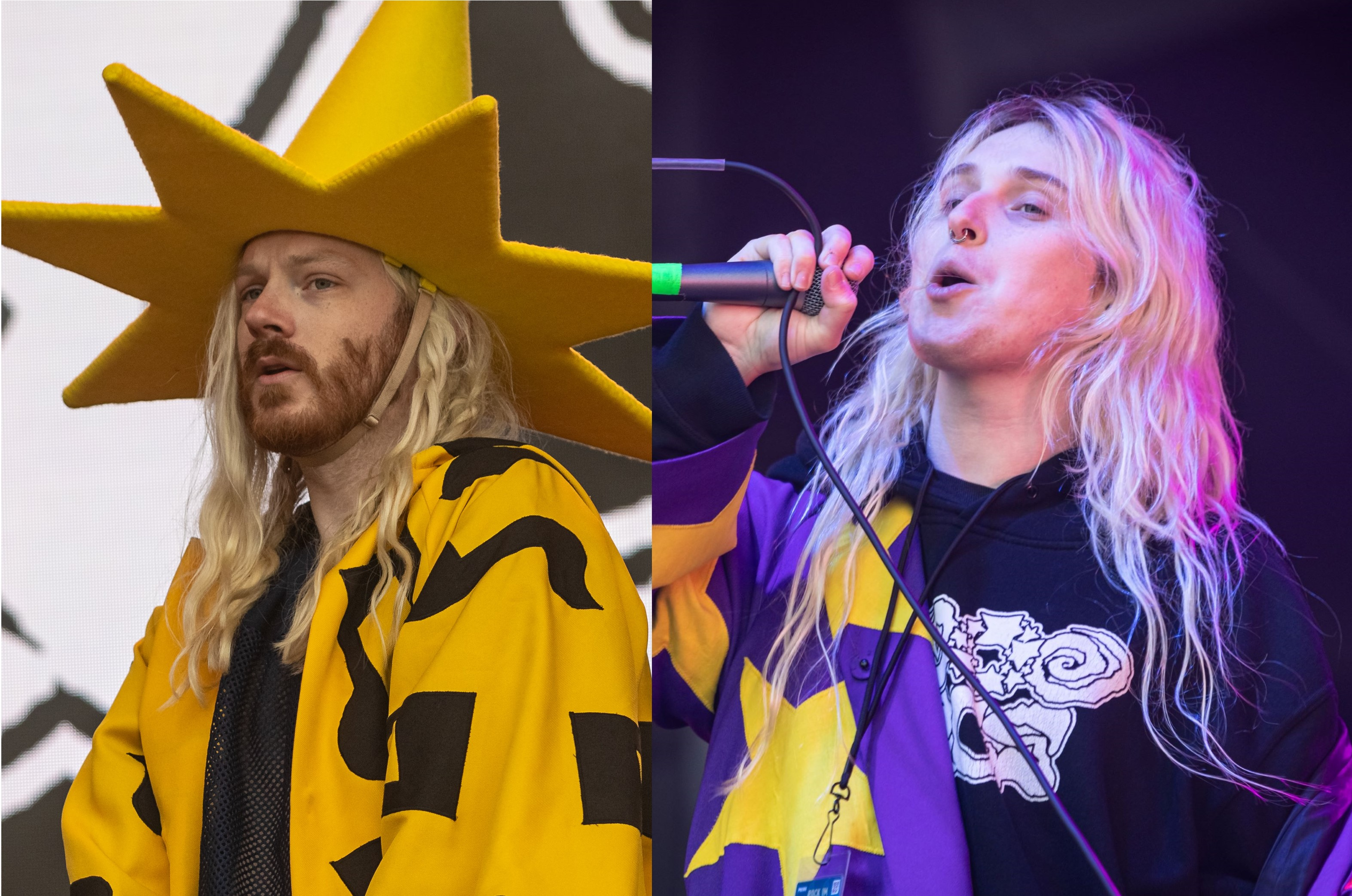
- Dylan Brady (left) and Laura Les in 2022

Background information
- Origin: St. Louis, Missouri, U.S.
- Genres: Hyperpop; experimental pop; electropop; electronic rock; pop-punk
- Works: Discography
- Years active: 2015–present
- Labels: Dog Show; Big Beat; Atlantic
- Members: Dylan Brady; Laura Les
- Website: 100gecs.com

100 Gecs (pronounced "one hundred gecks"; stylized in all lowercase) is an American musical duo formed in 2015, consisting of Dylan Brady and Laura Les. They self-released their debut album, 1000 Gecs, in 2019 to positive reviews, followed by a companion remix album, 1000 Gecs and the Tree of Clues, in 2020. They released their second studio album, 10,000 Gecs, in 2023. Their music has been noted for its often chaotic yet catchy mixture of various styles, and has been described as helping to define the hyperpop genre.

== History ==
=== 2015–2018: Formation and self-titled EP ===
Brady and Les, who lived just miles apart in the St. Louis area (Kirkwood and Webster Groves, respectively), first met during high school at a rodeo. However, they first had the idea to collaborate after meeting again at a house party in 2012. In the winter of 2015, Les and Brady first produced music together, recording in Laura's Chicago apartment and eventually self-releasing their first EP, 100 Gecs, on July 12, 2016. The origin of the name "100 Gecs" is unclear, as Brady and Les have given several contradictory explanations. In various interviews, they have claimed that they saw the name spray painted on a dorm building in Chicago, that Brady and Les saw the words "100" and "gecs" respectively in their dreams one night and decided to combine them, that the name was inspired by a time Les bought one gecko online but was sent a hundred, or that "gec" is an abbreviation for "getting exceptionally calm" or "getting exceptionally cool".

=== 2019–2020: 1000 Gecs and 1000 Gecs and the Tree of Clues ===
Despite plans to record more music, they were unable to find enough time until they performed a "breakout" DJ set together for the 2019 Minecraft Fire Festival. Following that collaboration, they continued to work on songs and released their debut album, 1000 Gecs, on May 31, 2019, to positive reviews. According to Will Pritchard of The Independent, the album helped to consolidate the eclectic "hyperpop" style by taking the genre "to its most extreme, and extremely catchy, conclusions: stadium-sized trap beats processed and distorted to near-destruction, overwrought emo vocals and cascades of ravey arpeggios."

In September 2019, it was announced that 100 Gecs and Slowthai would support Brockhampton on their Heaven Belongs to You Tour later that year, 100 Gecs also headlined six additional shows of their own in various cities along the tour. In November 2019, the duo appeared on the Adult Swim web series FishCenter Live and performed the songs "800db Cloud" and "Stupid Horse" in front of a green screen backdrop of an aquarium. 100 Gecs were named an "Artist You Need to Know" by Rolling Stone in 2019. New York Times music critic Jon Caramanica called 1000 gecs the best album of 2019, and it was rated among the best albums of the year by Crack Magazine, Noisey, Paper, Pitchfork, and Stereogum. Towards the end of 2019, Brady announced a remix album by the duo tentatively titled 1000 Gecs & Th3 Phant0m M3nac3 and set to feature artists including A. G. Cook. The album was later retitled 1000 Gecs and the Tree of Clues, which Les referred to as "a companion to the original". Tree of Clues was released on July 10, 2020.

Several singles were released prior to the album. A. G. Cook's remix of "Money Machine" was released in October 2019, followed by Injury Reserve's remix of "745 Sticky" in November 2019. "Ringtone (remix)", featuring Charli XCX, Rico Nasty, and Kero Kero Bonito, was released in February 2020. 100 Gecs signed with Atlantic Records in 2020. Brady told NME they are "trying to be really big—trying to be as big as Ed Sheeran", while Les said that Atlantic was a "good fit ... [t]here's so many things that they could help us accomplish". In October 2020, 100 Gecs commenced an artist residency at New York University's Clive Davis Institute of Recorded Music. Before the COVID-19 pandemic, they were scheduled to perform at Coachella in April 2020. 100 Gecs headlined another Minecraft festival, Square Garden, in April 2020, along with musical artists Charli XCX, Kero Kero Bonito, Dorian Electra, and Cashmere Cat. In August 2020, it was announced that 100 Gecs would perform at the Reading and Leeds Festivals in August 2021. On November 15, 2020, they released the stand-alone single "Lonely Machines" with American band 3OH!3. They followed this up with the Christmas song "Sympathy 4 the Grinch".

Brady produced several tracks for Rico Nasty in 2020, for example the August release "iPhone" and the November release "OHFR?", both of which were singles from her debut album Nightmare Vacation (2020). The production of two other tracks on the album were also credited to both Brady and Les, collectively under "100 gecs".

=== 2021–present: 10,000 Gecs ===
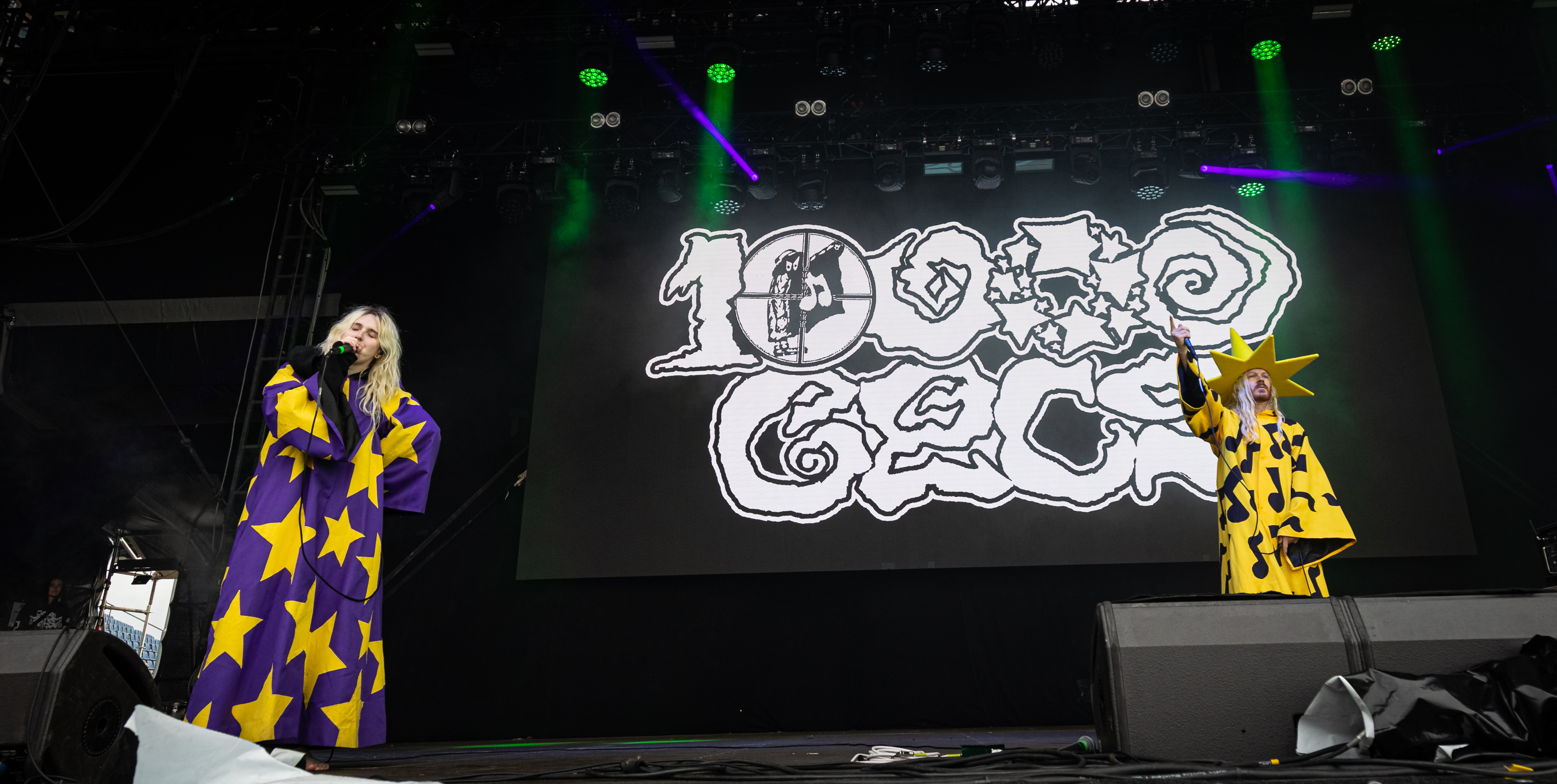
100 Gecs live at Rock am Ring 2022

In early 2021, the group released a remix of Linkin Park's "One Step Closer" to commemorate the 20th anniversary of Linkin Park's debut studio album, Hybrid Theory. Afterward, they embarked on independent projects, with Les releasing her debut solo single "Haunted" in March, and Brady releasing the debut album of his band Cake Pop, Cake Pop 2, in April.

In July 2021, the duo announced the 10000 Gecs Tour, with shows in North America set to take place from October to December. Supporting acts included Tony Velour, Underscores, Aaron Cartier, and Alice Gas. Four days into the tour, more dates were announced for the Europe 2022 leg of the 10000 Gecs Tour, originally set to start in Moscow in January, and closing out in London in February, but these were delayed until August and September. Several 2022 music festival lineups with 100 gecs were announced in late 2021 and 2022, such as BUKU, set to take place in New Orleans in March; Ceremonia in Mexico City in April; Coachella in Indio, California in April; Forecastle in Louisville in May; Governors Ball in Queens, New York in June (after pulling out of the festival the previous year); Bonnaroo in Manchester, Tennessee in June, and Lollapalooza, Chicago in August. They kicked off their Europe tour with a concert at Vega, Copenhagen on August 11, 2022, and closed it out at SWG3 in Glasgow on September 5.

On September 6, 100 Gecs announced their second studio album, 10,000 Gecs. According to Pitchfork's Steven Horowitz, the album is more mainstream and "mature" in its sound than their previous works, and would feature songs where Les is heard without the duo's trademark autotune. The North American leg of the 10000 gecs Tour started on October 8 at the Fox Theater in Oakland, California, and ended on December 9, at the Terminal 5 music venue in New York City, which was also broadcast on the live streaming service Twitch. On November 19, 100 Gecs released the first single off the album, "Mememe", during their tour, with an accompanying kaleidoscopic music video featuring the pair dancing in wizard robes. These robes were created by Elly Golterman and worn during their tours in 2021 and 2022.

On April 12, 2022, 100 Gecs released "Doritos & Fritos" as the second single for 10,000 Gecs, along with an accompanying visualizer. The song marks a deviation from their established sound, carrying more characteristics of alt-rock than hyperpop. A music video for the track was released on May 16, 2022, featuring the duo flying around a desert while the news reports on their actions, as well as a cameo from a Danny DeVito impersonator.

On December 2, 2022, 100 Gecs released their second EP, Snake Eyes, along with an accompanying visualizer on the track "Torture Me" featuring Skrillex. They also announced that 10,000 Gecs would be released on March 17, 2023. They released the song "Hollywood Baby" on February 16, 2023, alongside a music video, as the third single from the album, which they also revealed a tracklist for on the same day.

In January 2023, 100 Gecs announced the 10000 Gecs Tour 2, with North American dates from January to May, featuring Machine Girl as an opening act.

After numerous delays, 10,000 Gecs was released on March 17, 2023, alongside the music video for the album's final single "Dumbest Girl Alive", to positive reviews. Julianne Escobedo Shepherd of Pitchfork describes the project as "a reevaluation of the most declassé and dunderheaded rock genres that roiled the 2000s", most notably with singles like "Doritos & Fritos" and "Hollywood Baby". Mosi Reeves of Rolling Stone comments that the project shows that "100 gecs haven't lost their sense of joy, even as they codify their innovations into something resembling normality."

On February 15, 2024, 100 Gecs announced that Snake Eyes would be pressed onto a picture disc, to celebrate Record Store Day. "Hollywood Baby" was included in Tony Hawk's Pro Skater 3 + 4 in 2025. A new song by 100 Gecs called "Sensimilla" was included in Grand Theft Auto VI in 2026, and the duo also contributed to the game's additional score.

== Fandom ==
Following the group's success, the pine tree depicted on the album covers of 1000 Gecs and remix album Tree of Clues became popular among fans. Soon, the 100 Gecs tree was found, revealed to be located in an Acuity Brands-owned office park in Des Plaines, Illinois, near O'Hare International Airport. A similar phenomenon has occurred with the bridge in Orange, California, depicted on the cover of 10,000 Gecs, although not to the same extent as the tree. Fans of 100 Gecs began making "pilgrimages" to the tree and leaving items behind. The adoration of the tree was referenced in season 2, episode 4 of Only Murders in the Building. In the Chicago Tribune, the tree and its fame were compared to the house on the cover of American Football's American Football (1999), located in Urbana, Illinois. The music video for their single "Money Machine" was filmed in the same office park just before the album cover photo was taken.

== Production style and influences ==
100 Gecs' musical style has been mainly described as hyperpop, experimental pop, electropop, electronic rock, and pop punk. The duo works on tracks by sending Logic Pro project files between the two, iterating songs each time—Les called the process "sort of an exquisite corpse type thing". Their music has been called an "anarchic assault on the ears" that "[pulls] conventional pop tropes in every direction possible", as well as "abrasive, maximalist pop" with "elements of pop punk, nightcore, ska, dubstep, deconstructed club, trance, metal, and happy hardcore all thrown into one big internet blender", resulting in "[s]ongs [that] shift gears dozens of times, in a way that recalls ... Kid606, or Venetian Snares", also earning comparisons with label PC Music and band Sleigh Bells. Les explained that the "merging of genres" is "more natural than people think", adding that the group "didn't expect that 1000 Gecs would resonate with people so much".

Brady has said 100 Gecs' style is influenced by Breathe Carolina, John Zorn, and I See Stars, among others. Les calls their musical process "[v]ery much almost an improv mentality" and has said that they "try to have fun and write songs that we would want to listen to", adding that "the whole idea of labeling genres is not super important to us". Les became interested in making music as a teenager when she got her first guitar; she has said that she "kind of always just wanted to be a songwriter" and "love[s] anything with a catchy melody". She has cited Naked City, Playboi Carti, 3OH!3, Cannibal Corpse, and various PC Music artists as influences. Both of them were heavily inspired by Skrillex's song "Scary Monsters and Nice Sprites".

== Discography ==
- 1000 Gecs (2019)
- 10,000 Gecs (2023)

== Tours ==
=== Headlining tours ===
- The Secret Tour (2019)
- 10000 Gecs Tour (with Aaron Cartier, Alice Gas, Underscores, and Tony Velour) (2021–2022)
- Welcome to the World Tour (2022)
- 10000 Gecs Tour 2, 3, 4 (with Machine Girl) (2023) 5 (European tour, cancelled as of Jan 2024)

=== Supporting tours ===
- Heaven Belongs to You Tour with Brockhampton (2019)
- U.S. 2022 with Nine Inch Nails (2022)
- My Chemical Romance Reunion Tour (2022)
- Long Live The Black Parade with My Chemical Romance (2025)
