= Dylan Brady =

American musician (born 1993)

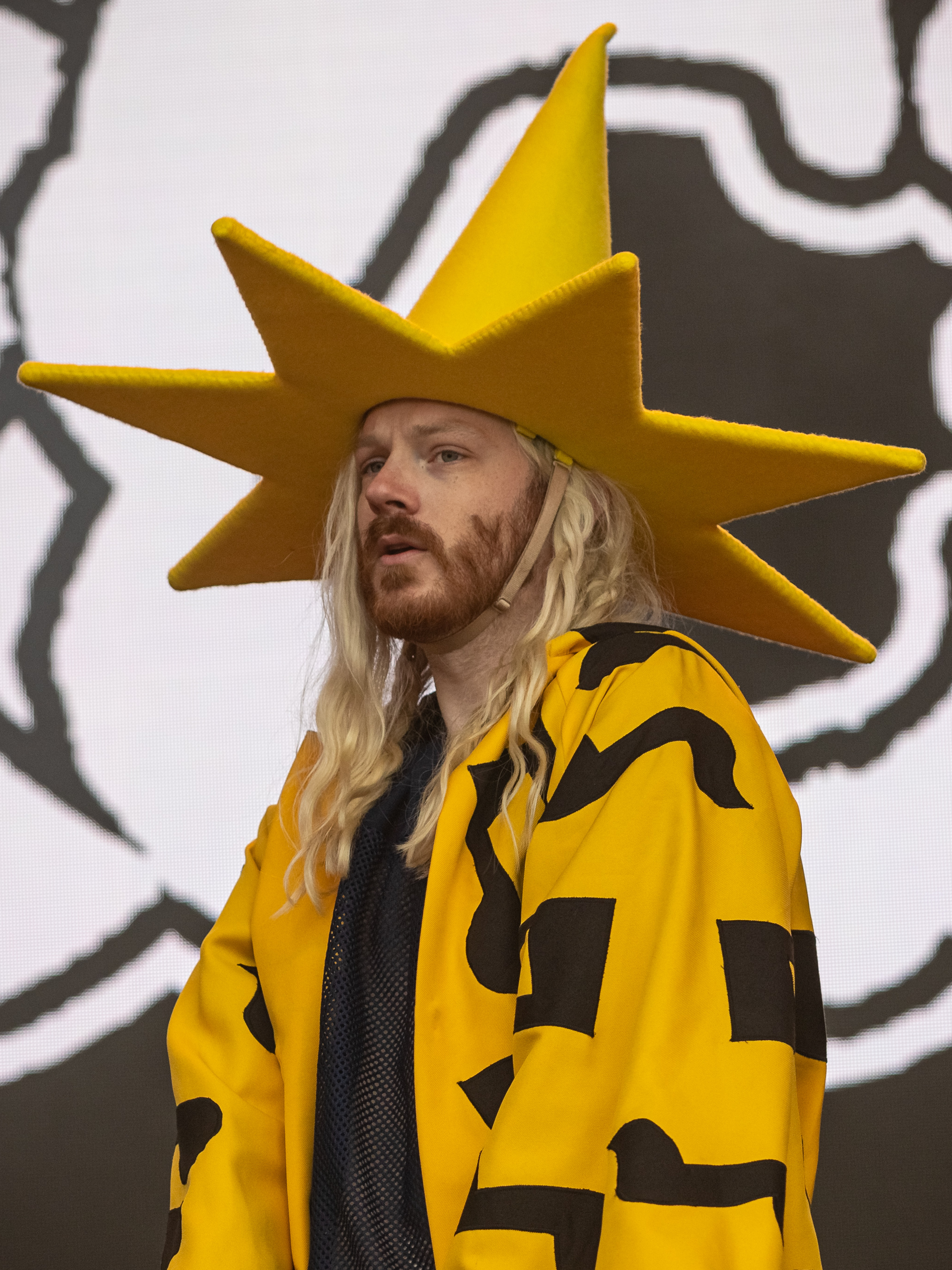
- Brady at Rock am Ring, 2022

Background information
- Born: Dylan Marshall Brady; 1993 or 1994 (age 32–33)
- Genres: Experimental; hyperpop; electronic; pop; hip hop
- Occupations: Music producer, singer, songwriter
- Years active: 2013–present
- Labels: Mad Decent; Owsla; Dog Show; Atlantic
- Member of: 100 Gecs; Cake Pop

Dylan Marshall Brady (born 1993 or 1994) is an American music producer, singer, and songwriter, best known for being one half of experimental electronic music duo 100 Gecs, alongside Laura Les. He also owns and operates the record label Dog Show Records.

== Early life ==
Dylan Marshall Brady grew up in suburban St. Louis, Missouri and took piano lessons in high school, where he first became interested in composing music. While attending college for audio engineering, he began putting music out on SoundCloud, as an electronic hip hop producer.

== Career ==
Brady began his career releasing several demo albums on SoundCloud in 2013 and 2014. He self-released his debut studio album All I Ever Wanted in May 2015. In 2016 he released the EP Choker and released a self-titled EP as part of 100 gecs. In 2017 Brady released two EPs, Sinses and Dog Show. In October 2018, Brady released the EP Peace & Love, his first release on the Mad Decent label. His collaborative studio album with singer and producer Josh Pan, This Car Needs Some Wheels, was released in March 2019.

== Discography ==
Dylan Brady discography
- Studio albums: 3
- EPs: 5
- Singles: 8
- Demo album: 3

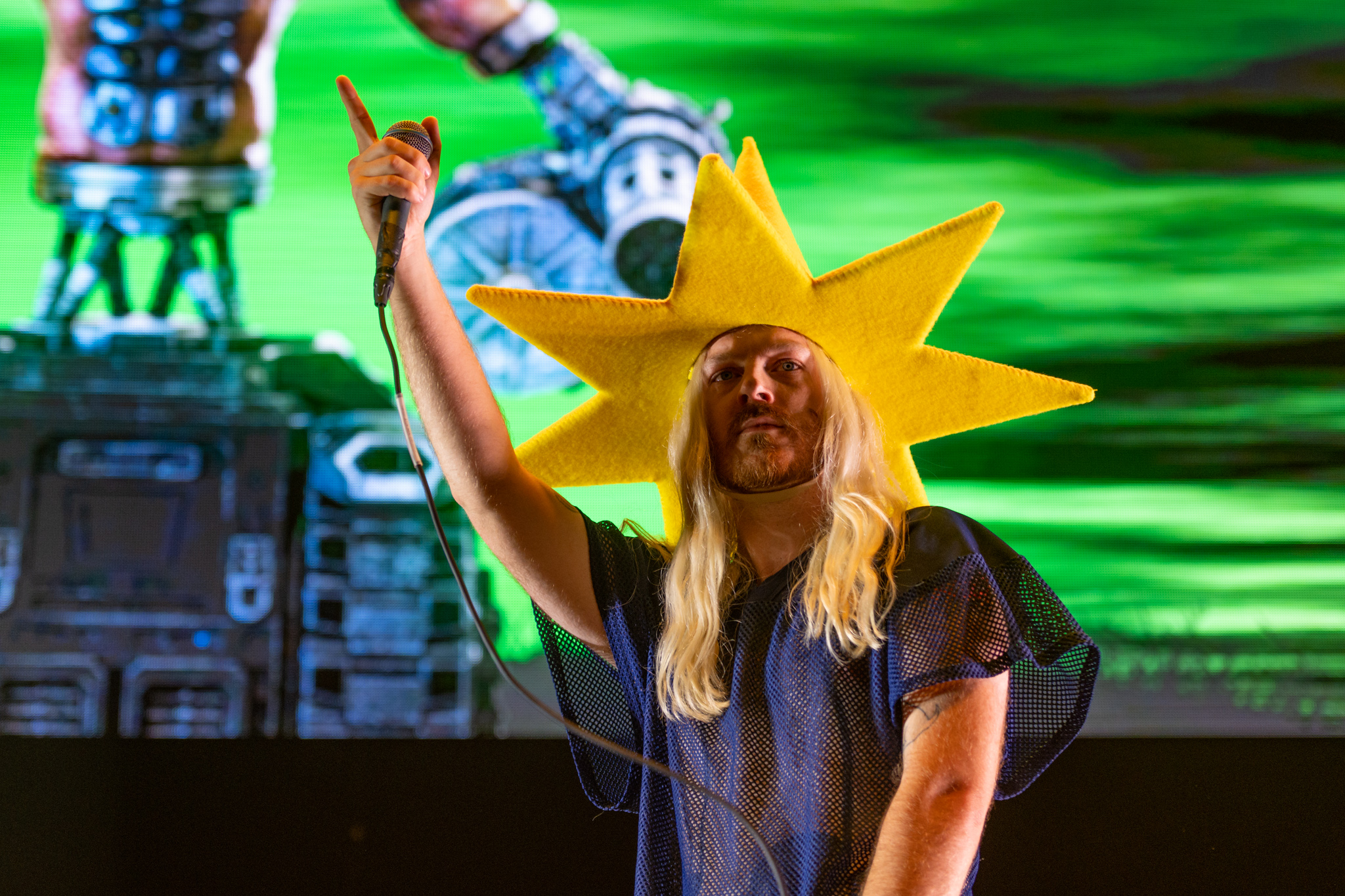
Brady performing at Rock im Park 2022 in Nuremberg

=== Studio albums ===
Title	Details
All I Ever Wanted	Released: May 1, 2015; Label: Self-released; Format: Digital download
This Car Needs Some Wheels (with Josh Pan)	Released: March 18, 2019; Label: OWSLA; Format: Digital download

=== Demo albums ===
Title	Details
Swahili	Released: July 25, 2013; Label: Self-released; Format: streaming
Mango Juice	Released: 2014; Label: Self-released; Format: streaming
Zero Halliburton	Released: 2014; Label: Self-released; Format: streaming

=== Extended plays ===
Title	Details
Saxophone Joe	Released: 2014; Label: Self-released; Format: streaming
Choker	Released: August 12, 2016; Label: Self-released; Format: Digital download
Sinses (with BLOOM)	Released: January 18, 2017; Label: Self-released; Format: Digital download
Dog Show	Released: February 6, 2017; Label: Self-released; Format: Digital download
Peace & Love	Released: October 19, 2018; Label: Mad Decent; Format: Digital download
Needle Guy	Released: March 20, 2026; Label: Dog Show, Atlantic; Format: Digital download

=== Singles ===
==== As lead artist ====
Title	Year	Album
"Will You Look for Me When You Need Someone"	2016	Choker
"Go Away"	2016	Choker
"Coming Down"	2016	Choker
"7/11 Drone" (featuring Daisy)	2018	Peace & Love
"I'll Make You Miss Me All The Time"	2018	Peace & Love
"Of Course I Still Love You"	2018	Peace & Love
"Wheels"	2019	This Car Needs Some Wheels
"Supersonic (My Existence)" (with Skrillex, Noisia and Josh Pan)	2023	Quest for Fire
"Needle Guy"	2026	Needle Guy

==== As featured artist ====
Title	Year	Album
"Loading Screen" (Lewis Grant featuring Dylan Brady)	2014	Non-album singles
"Give Me the Keys" (Night Lovell featuring Dylan Brady)	2015	Non-album singles
"Emoji" (Lewis Grant featuring Dylan Brady)	2016	Non-album singles
"I" (vōx featuring Dylan Brady)	2016	Non-album singles
"Georgia" (Pritty featuring Dylan Brady)		Non-album singles
"Pull Up" (Tony Velour featuring Dylan Brady)	2017	Non-album singles
"Euro Plug" (Tony Velour featuring Dylan Brady)	2018	Non-album singles
"Toxic" (Pussy Riot featuring Dorian Electra and Dylan Brady)	2021	

=== SoundCloud releases ===
Title	Year
"Chain Gang"	2013
"Feel the Fire"	2013
"Mugabe" (with Roh Bee)	2013
"Ice Grass" (with Roh Bee)	2014
"Quizzy" (with The Kid Devo and Roh Bee)	2014
"Wonder Years"	2014
"Loading"	2014
"Bam Margera Element Classic"	2014
"It's Been a While" (with Hnrk)	2015
"Take Care of My Dog When I'm Gone"	2015
"Love U BB"	2016
"Plz Don't Tell Me Why I Feel How I Feel Thx ☺"	2016
"When It's Cold" (featuring Dom McLennon, Lewis Grant, and Saputo)	2016
"OMG"	2016
"Smoked Jerky (Single Stack)" (featuring Babies Next Door)	2017
"Ice Mtn"	2017
"Blink 180"	2017
"Will U Go to the Dance with Me"	2018
"Date Night!"	2018
"U Can Find Me Here"	2018
"ILY All the Time"	2018
"The Greatest"	2018
"Hate Me Today" (featuring Ravenna Golden)	2018

=== Guest performances ===
Title	Year	Other artist(s)	Album
"Sparkly"	2015	Ravenna Golden	Girl Gone Wild
"Just Tryna"	2016	Night Lovell	Red Teenage Melody
"Good Friends"	2016	NOK from the Future	Bombs 1
"Weeknights"	2016	Cali Cartier	The Cartier
"D$M"	2016	Cali Cartier	The Cartier
"Ballin"	2016	Cali Cartier	The Cartier
"No Worries"	2016	DAT ADAM	HYDRA 3D
"Not 4Ever"	2017	Hellion	Gravekeeper
"Up in Flames"	2018	DAMSTERAM, JRND, narou	Analog
"Out of Love"	2018	Alessia Cara	The Pains of Growing
"Blue"	2018	The Neighbourhood	Hard to Imagine The Neighbourhood Ever Changing
"F**k You"	2018	Kailee Morgue	Non-album single
"Black Sheep"	2019	Kailee Morgue	Non-album single
"Click"	2019	Charli XCX, Kim Petras, Tommy Cash or Slayyyter	Charli
"New Hawaii"	2019	Injury Reserve, DRAM, Tony Velour	Injury Reserve
"Crazy"	2019	The Hillside	Non-album single
"Welcome Home"	2020	The Good Friend	Non-album single
"claws"	2020	Charli XCX	how i'm feeling now
"anthems"	2020	Charli XCX	how i'm feeling now
"Used to Know Me"	2022	Charli XCX	Crash

=== Production and songwriting credits ===
Credits taken from Tidal.

Year	Artist	Song	Album	Written with	Produced with
2015	Robel Ketema	"Don't HMU"	Non-album singles	Robel Ketema	Sole producer
2015	Robel Ketema	"Concoco Freestyle"	Non-album singles	Robel Ketema	Sole producer
2016	Robel Ketema	"We Need Space"	Non-album singles	Robel Ketema	Sole producer
2016	Lil Aaron	"GLOING PAIN$"	GLOING PAIN$	brenton duvall, lil aaron, Paul Judge, Y2K	Y2K, brenton duvall, Polyphia
2016	Lil Aaron	"STRONGER"	GLOING PAIN$	brenton duvall, lil aaron, Paul Judge, Y2K	Y2K, brenton duvall
2016	Lil Aaron	"NOBODY"	GLOING PAIN$	brenton duvall, lil aaron, Paul Judge, Y2K	Y2K, brenton duvall
2016	Lil Aaron	"4 MORE DRINKS / PINK FENTY SLIDES"	GLOING PAIN$	brenton duvall, lil aaron, Paul Judge, Y2K	—N/a
2016	Lil Aaron	"GO 2 HELL"	GLOING PAIN$	brenton duvall, lil aaron, Paul Judge, Y2K	Aaron Zuckerman, Y2K, brenton duvall
2016	Lil Aaron	"NIGHTRIDER"	GLOING PAIN$	brenton duvall, lil aaron, Paul Judge, Y2K	Y2K, brenton duvall
2017	Jesse	"Born to Be Blonde"	&	Jesse	Sole producer
2017	Jesse	"Pretty Illusion"	&	Jesse	Sole producer
2017	Jesse	"I Think We Should Stay In Love"	&	Jesse	Sole producer
2017	Jesse	"Bloom Later"	&	—N/a	Sole producer
2017	Jesse	"Drama"	&	Jesse	Sole producer
2017	Jesse	"IDK"	&	Jesse	Sole producer
2017	Jesse	"Dime & Dogs"	&	Jesse	Sole producer
2017	Jesse	"Guinea Pig"	&	Jesse	Sole producer
2017	92Jack	"2 Goth Kids"	Non-album single	Famous Dex, Jack Bruno	—N/a
2017	DAMSTERDAM, JRND	"Up in Flames"	Analog	J. Xidas, Jeroen Dekker, Joshua Jack Brust, Nikolas Heidinger, S. Cubit	—N/a
2018	Lewis Grant	"Vacation"	Make Me Scared Again	—N/a	Sole producer
2018	Lewis Grant	"How Could I Know"	Make Me Scared Again	—N/a	Sole producer
2018	Lewis Grant	"Daniel"	Make Me Scared Again	—N/a	Lewis Grant, Y2K
2018	Lewis Grant	"Bad Batch"	Make Me Scared Again	—N/a	Sole producer
2018	Lewis Grant	"Bad Batch, Pt. 2"	Make Me Scared Again	—N/a	Judge, Y2K
2018	Goody Grace	"210 Lilac Sky"	Infinite	Goody Grace	—N/a
2018	Kailee Morgue	"Fuck U"	Non-album single	Kailee Morgue	Sole producer
2018	Tony Velour	"First Time For Everything"	Non-album single	Tony Velour	—N/a
2018	L.I.F.T.	"Dressed in Black"	AUTOP$Y	Austin Arthur, Cameron Phillips, Holden Prine, Jay Smith, Reuben Pearl, Robert Carter	—N/a
2018	Goody Grace	"Judas"	19/6	Goody Goody	—N/a
2018	Pritty	"Georgia"	Non-album single	Devon Nunez	Sole producer
2018	Goody Grace, G-Eazy	"Girls in the Suburbs Singing Smiths Songs"	Non-album single	Gerald Gillu, Goody Goody	—N/a
2018	Ro Ransom	"Pop"	Possessed	Noah Gale	Sole producer
2018	Role Model	"Six Speed"	Non-album single	Blake Slatkin, Tucker Pillsbury	—N/a
2018	The Neighbourhood	"Dust"	Hard To Image The Neighbourhood Ever Changing	—N/a	Lars Stalfors
2018	The Neighbourhood	"Blue"	Hard To Image The Neighbourhood Ever Changing	Brandon Fried, Jeremiah Freedman, Jesse James Rutherford, Jesse St. John Gellar, Lars Stalfors, Michael Margott, Sarah Hudson, Zachary Abels	Lars Stalfors
2018	The Neighbourhood	"Heaven"	Hard To Image The Neighbourhood Ever Changing	Brandon Fried, Danny Parra, Jeremiah Freedman, Jesse James Rutherford, Jesse St. John Gellar, Lars Stalfors, Michael Margott, Rock Mafia, Sarah Hudson, Zachary Abels	Lars Stalfors, Rock Mafia
2018	Yung Skrrt	"Ibtdbw"	Triple Other	Yung Skrrt	Yung Skrrt
2018	Ravenna Golden	"Open My Eyes"	Non-album single	Dorian Electra, Ravenna Golden, Jaan Umru Rothenberg (as umru)	umru
2019	Clay	"Feelings"	Hues	Clay	Sole producer
2019	Deb Never	"Ugly"	House on Wheels	Deborah Jung	D33J
2019	Deb Never	"Same"	House on Wheels	Deborah Jung, Djavan Santos, Naomie Abergel	D33J
2019	Deb Never	"Swimming"	House on Wheels	Deborah Jung	Sole producer
2019	Injury Reserve	"Jailbreak the Tesla"	Injury Reserve	Adam Daniel, Jordan Groggs, Maria-Cecilia Simone Kelly, Nathaniel Ritchie, William Corey	Injury Reserve
2019	AOBeats	"Running"	Non-album single	Alexandra McDonald, Andrew Okamura, Mike Derenzo	Andrew Okamura, Mike Derenzo
2019	Liz	"Diamond in the Dark"	Planet Y2K	Elizabeth Abrams, Jarina De Marco	Sole producer
2019	Liz	"Cool With It"	Planet Y2K	Elizabeth Abrams, Sophia Black	Sole producer
2019	Pritty	"Girls & Girls"	Non-album single	Devon Nunez	—N/a
2019	Kailee Morgue	"Black Sheep"	Non-album single	—N/a	Sole producer
2019	Clay	"Project 5 (Demo)"	Non-album single	Clay	Sole producer
2019	William Crooks	"Chicago"	Waterboy	—N/a	Sole producer
2019	William Crooks	"Sameolsssshhh"	Waterboy	—N/a	Sole producer
2019	William Crooks	"Popout"	Waterboy	—N/a	Sole producer
2019	Dorian Electra	"Daddy Like"	Flamboyant	Bonnie McKee, Dorian Electra, Michael Zarowny, Peter John Shepard-Vanoudenaren	ABSRDST
2019	Dorian Electra	"Musical Genius"	Flamboyant	Dorian Electra	Sole producer
2019	Dorian Electra	"Live by the Sword"	Flamboyant	Dorian Electra	Sole producer
2019	Dorian Electra	"Adam & Steve"	Flamboyant	Dorian Electra, umru	umru, ABSRDST
2019	Dorian Electra	"Guyliner, Pt. 2"	Flamboyant	Dorian Electra, Michael Zarowny, Bonnie McKee	Sole producer
2019	Charli XCX	"Click"	Charli	A. G. Cook, Charlotte Aitchison, umru, Theron Thomas, Tommy Cash	A. G. Cook, umru, ö
2019	Brevon Kim	"The Wedding!"	Cliff	—N/a	Sole producer
2019	SwitchMIX	"Ice Boy"	Not For Me	—N/a	Sole producer
2019	Pritty	"Deceit"	Non-album single	Devon Nunez	—N/a
2019	03 Greedo, Kenny Beats	"Aye Twin"	Netflix & Deal	Jason Jackson, Kenneth Blume, Marquis Whiitaker	Kenny Beats
2019	Alice Longyu Gao	"Dumb Bitch Juice"	Non-album singles	Longyu Gao, Nat Puff	Sole producer
2019	Alice Longyu Gao	"Rich Bitch Juice"	Non-album singles	Longyu Gao	Sole producer
2019	Left at London	"6 Feet"	Non-album singles	Nat Puff	Sole producer
2019	Pritty	"Birds and Bees"	Non-album singles	Devon Nunez, Kevin Bedford	—N/a
2019	Supachefm, ShiniGami	"Fuck That Bitch!"	Non-album singles	Gianni Veloz, Michael Cesari, Ryan Jacob	—N/a
2019	Cali Cartier	"Rabbits"	Dakota	Calvin Lewis	—N/a
2019	Cali Cartier	"Save Us"	Dakota	Calvin Lewis	—N/a
2019	Cali Cartier	"Peace & Love"	Dakota	Calvin Lewis	—N/a
2019	Cali Cartier	"Win This War"	Songs	Calvin Lewis	—N/a
2019	Cali Cartier	"Gun"	Songs	Calvin Lewis	—N/a
2019	Cali Cartier	"Pianoman"	Cartier Evil	Calvin Lewis	—N/a
2019	Cali Cartier	"Cartier Evil"	Cartier Evil	Calvin Lewis	—N/a
2019	Cali Cartier	"Waaav"	Cartier Evil	Calvin Lewis	—N/a
2019	Cali Cartier	"Remedy"	Dovelace	Calvin Lewis	—N/a
2019	Pritty	"Imagine That"	Luster	Devon Nunez, Kevin Bedford	
2020	Hoodie Trash	"Turtleneck and Shorts"	Non-album single	Jennifer May	
2020	Kevin Bedford	"Cells Divide"	Heights	Kevin Bedford	Sole producer
2020	Kevin Bedford	"Moment"	Heights	Kevin Bedford	Sole producer
2020	Kevin Bedford	"4u"	Heights	Devon Nunez, Kevin Bedford, Ravenna Kerr-Grant	Sole producer
2020	NYCL Kai	"Incredible"	NYCL Kai	—N/a	Judge
2020	NYCL Kai	"What About You"	NYCL Kai	—N/a	Sole producer
2020	Alice Longyu Gao	"Young Piece of Shit Shut Up"	Non-album single	—N/a	Jack Laboz
2020	The Garden	"Hit Eject"	Kiss My Super Bowl Ring	—N/a	Sole producer
2020	The Garden	"The King of Cutting Corners"	Kiss My Super Bowl Ring	—N/a	Sole producer
2020	The Garden	"Lurkin'"	Kiss My Super Bowl Ring	—N/a	Sole producer
2020	Brakence	"sauceintherough"	Punk2	Randy Findell	Randy Findell
2020	VELVETEARS	"Philophobia"	Non-album single	—N/a	Sole producer
2020	Lewis Grant	"Being Alive"	Non-album single	—N/a	Sole producer
2020	Lil West, Brevin Kim	"Violin"	Metallic Body Language	Brendan Paulhus, Callin Paulhus, Semaj Grant	Sole producer
2020	Lil West, Brevin Kim	"Bleach"	Metallic Body Language	Brendan Paulhus, Callin Paulhus, Semaj Grant	Sole producer
2020	Lil West, Brevin Kim	"Say No More"	Metallic Body Language	Alex Theesfield, Brendan Paulhus, Callin Paulhus, Semaj Grant	—N/a
2020	Crvtch	"Just Trying to Get Down"	Non-album single	Sole writer	—N/a
2020	Cali Cartier	"Sick"	Pink	Calvin Lewis	—N/a
2020	Charli XCX	"Claws"	how i'm feeling now	BJ Burton, Charlotte Aitchison	Sole producer
2020	Charli XCX	"C2.0"	how i'm feeling now	Alexander Guy Cook, Charlotte Aitchison, umru, Theron Thomas, Tommy Cash	—N/a
2020	Charli XCX	"Anthems"	how i'm feeling now	Charlotte Aitchison, Danny L Harle	Danny L Harle
2020	Va Lil Panda, Lil Bby	"Let Me Know"	TBA	—N/a	Sole producer
2020	Nasty Cherry	"I Am King"	Season 2	Chloe Chaidez, Deborah Knox-Hewson, Gabriella Bechtel, Georgia Somary	Sole producer
2020	Hoodie Trash	"Smokin' Loud"	Non-album single	Jennifer May	—N/a
2020	Round Table Clique	"Makeup"	RTC	Devon Nunez, Robel Ketema, Tin Menzel	—N/a
2020	Round Table Clique	"Possibilities"	RTC	Devon Nunez, Robel Ketema, Tin Menzel	—N/a
2020	Round Table Clique	"Shell Toe Boots"	RTC	Devon Nunez, Robel Ketema, Tin Menzel	—N/a
2020	Round Table Clique	"Jumanji"	RTC	Devon Nunez, Robel Ketema, Tin Menzel	—N/a
2020	Round Table Clique	"Rihanna"	RTC	Devon Nunez, Robel Ketema, Tin Menzel	—N/a
2020	Round Table Clique	"Knowing How to Spell"	RTC	Devon Nunez, Robel Ketema, Tin Menzel	—N/a
2020	Round Table Clique	"Living For It"	RTC	Devon Nunez, Louis Miles, Robel Ketema, Tim Menzel	—N/a
2020	Dorian Electra	"F The World"	My Agenda	Count Baldor, Dorian Electra, d0llywood1, Mood Killer, Quay Dash, The Garden	Count Baldor, Lars Stalfors, umru, d0llywood1
2020	Dorian Electra	"Gentleman"	My Agenda	Count Baldor, Dorian Electra, Mood Killer	Count Baldor
2020	Dorian Electra	"Sorry Bro (I Love You)"	My Agenda	—N/a	Count Baldor
2020	Dorian Electra	"Monk Mode (Interlude)"	My Agenda	Dorian Electra, Gaylord	Sole producer
2020	Juice Wrld & Benny Blanco	"Real Shit"	Friends Keep Secrets 2	Benjamin Levin, Magnus August Høiberg, Jarad Higgins, Henry Kwapis, Jack Karaszewski	Benny Blanco, Cashmere Cat, Henry Kwapis, Jack Karaszewski
2020	Rico Nasty	"iPhone"	Nightmare Vacation	Maria Kelly	Sole producer
2020	Rico Nasty	"OHFR?"	Nightmare Vacation	Maria Kelly	Sole producer
2020	Rico Nasty	"Pussy Poppin"	Nightmare Vacation	Laura Les, Maria Kelly, Malik Foxx Parker	100 Gecs
2020	Rico Nasty	"Let It Out"	Nightmare Vacation	Laura Les, Maria Kelly, Malik Foxx Parker	100 Gecs
2021	Rebecca Black	"Friday (Remix)"	Non-album single	—N/a	Sole producer
2021	Ravenna Golden	"Expensive City"	Non-album single	—N/a	Sole producer
2021	Robel Ketema	"Thunder"	Non-album single	Robel Ketema	Sole producer
2022	Charli XCX	"Used to Know Me"	Crash	Charlotte Aitchison, Noonie Bao, Linus Wiklund, Allen George, Fred McFarlane	—N/a
2023	underscores	"Count of three (You can eat $#@!)"	Non-album single	April Harper Grey, Benjamin Levin, Magnus August Høiberg	underscores, Benny Blanco, Cashmere Cat
2023	Teezo Touchdown	"The Original Was Better"	How Do You Sleep at Night?	Aaron Thomas, Ari Starace	Y2K
2024	Lewis Grant	"Numbskull"	Non-album single	—N/a	Sole producer
2024	Charli XCX	"Guess"	Brat	Charlotte Aitchison, Harrison Patrick Smith	The Dare
2024	Thoom	"Cortisol"	TBA	Zeynab Marwan, Lillith	Lillith
2025	FKA Twigs	"Striptease"	Eusexua	Tahliah Barnett, Lewis Roberts, Marius de Vries, Mark Williams, Raul Cubina	FKA Twigs, Koreless, Marius de Vries, Ojivolta, Felix Joseph
2025	Thoom	"Feral"	TBA	Zeynab Marwan	Sole producer
2025	Selena Gomez, Benny Blanco & Gracie Abrams	"Call Me When You Break Up"	I Said I Love You First	Benjamin Levin, Magnus Høiberg, Selena Gomez, Julia Michaels, Justin Tranter, Gracie Abrams, Mattias Larsson, Robin Fredriksson	Benny Blanco, Cashmere Cat
2025	Thoom	"December Forever"	TBA	Zeynab Marwan, Madison Love	Sole producer
2025	Adéla	"DeathByDevotion"	The Provocateur	Adéla Jergová	Adéla Jergová
2026	Joji	"Sojourn"	Piss in the Wind	George Miller, Kenneth Charles Blume III	Kenny Beats
2026	xaviersobased	"Party At My Place"	Xavier	Xavier Lopez, Sonny Moore	Skrillex

=== Remixes ===
Title	Original artist	Year
"Free"	Piers	2014
"Bulletproof"	Me Not You	2016
"Migos Raindrop Droptop"	Sybyr	2017
"Pile Up 💰 💸"	BLNTSMK	2018
"Blame It on Your Love"	Charli XCX featuring Lizzo	2019
"Earring"	Instupendo	2019
"Rich Bitch Juice"	Alice Longyu Gao	2019
"Invisible"	Hannah Diamond	2020
"Friday"	Rebecca Black	2021

=== As part of 100 gecs ===
Album	Year
100 Gecs	2016
1000 Gecs	2019
1000 Gecs and the Tree of Clues	2020
Snake Eyes	2022
10,000 Gecs	2023

=== As part of Cake Pop ===
Studio albums

- Cake Pop 2 (2021)

Extended plays

- CAKE POP (2015)

Singles

- "Sticky Fingers" (2016)
- "Black Rum" (2021)
- "Satin Bedsheets" (2021)
