= Laura Les =

American musician

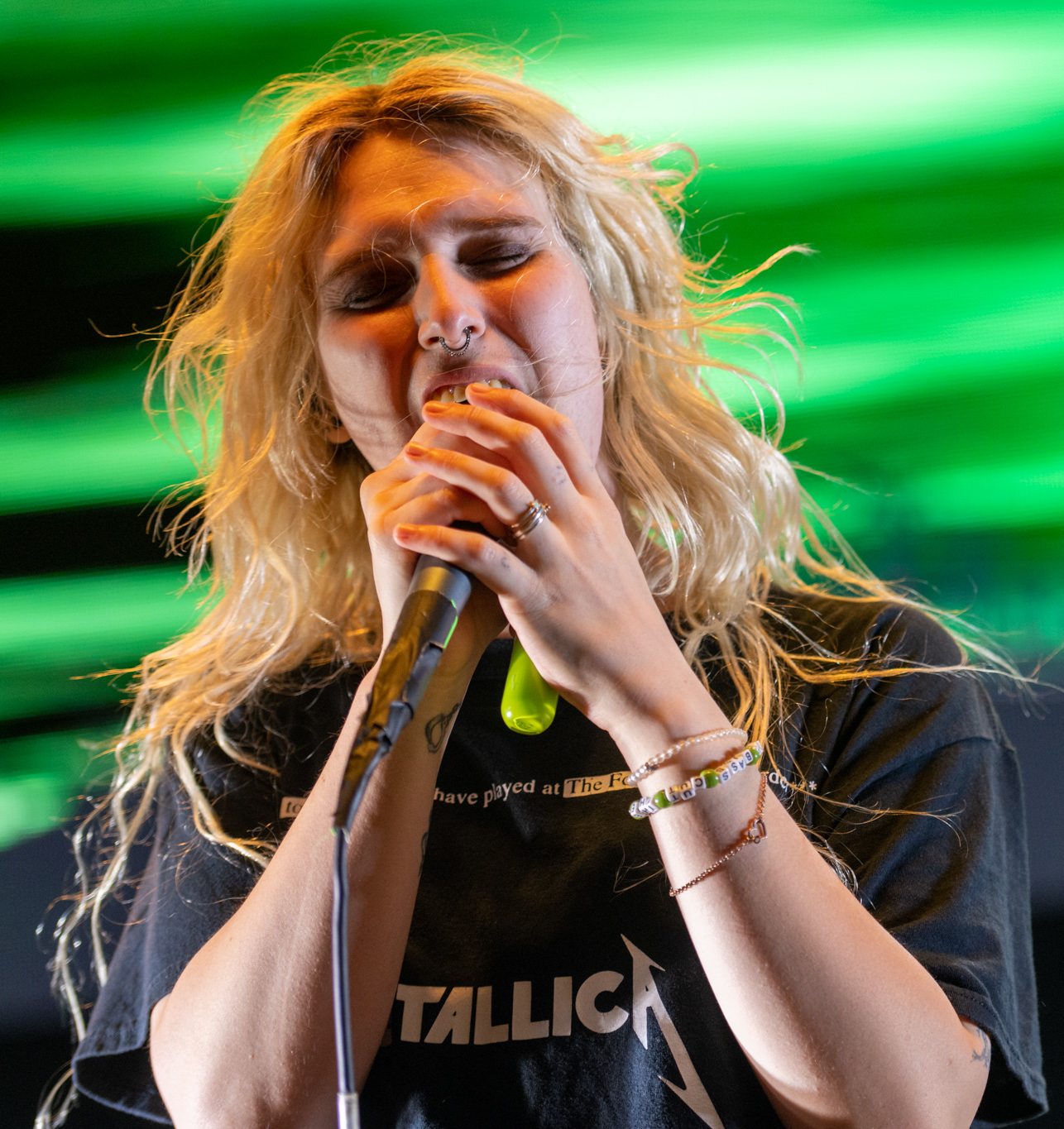
- Les at Rock im Park 2022 in Germany

Background information
- Also known as: osno1
- Born: 1994 or 1995 (age 31–32)
- Genres: Experimental; hyperpop; electronic; pop; nightcore; noise
- Occupations: Music producer; singer; songwriter
- Member of: 100 Gecs
- Spouses: Gabe Howell (m. 2017; sep. unknown); May Leitz (eng. 2024)

Laura Les (born 1994 or 1995), previously known under the moniker osno1, is an American music producer, singer and songwriter best known as one half of experimental electronic duo 100 Gecs, alongside Dylan Brady.

== Early life ==
Les grew up in a suburb of St. Louis, Missouri. As a teenager, she became interested in music while learning to play guitar. While attending Columbia College in Chicago, where she earned a degree in acoustic engineering, she began releasing music online under the moniker osno1.

== Career ==
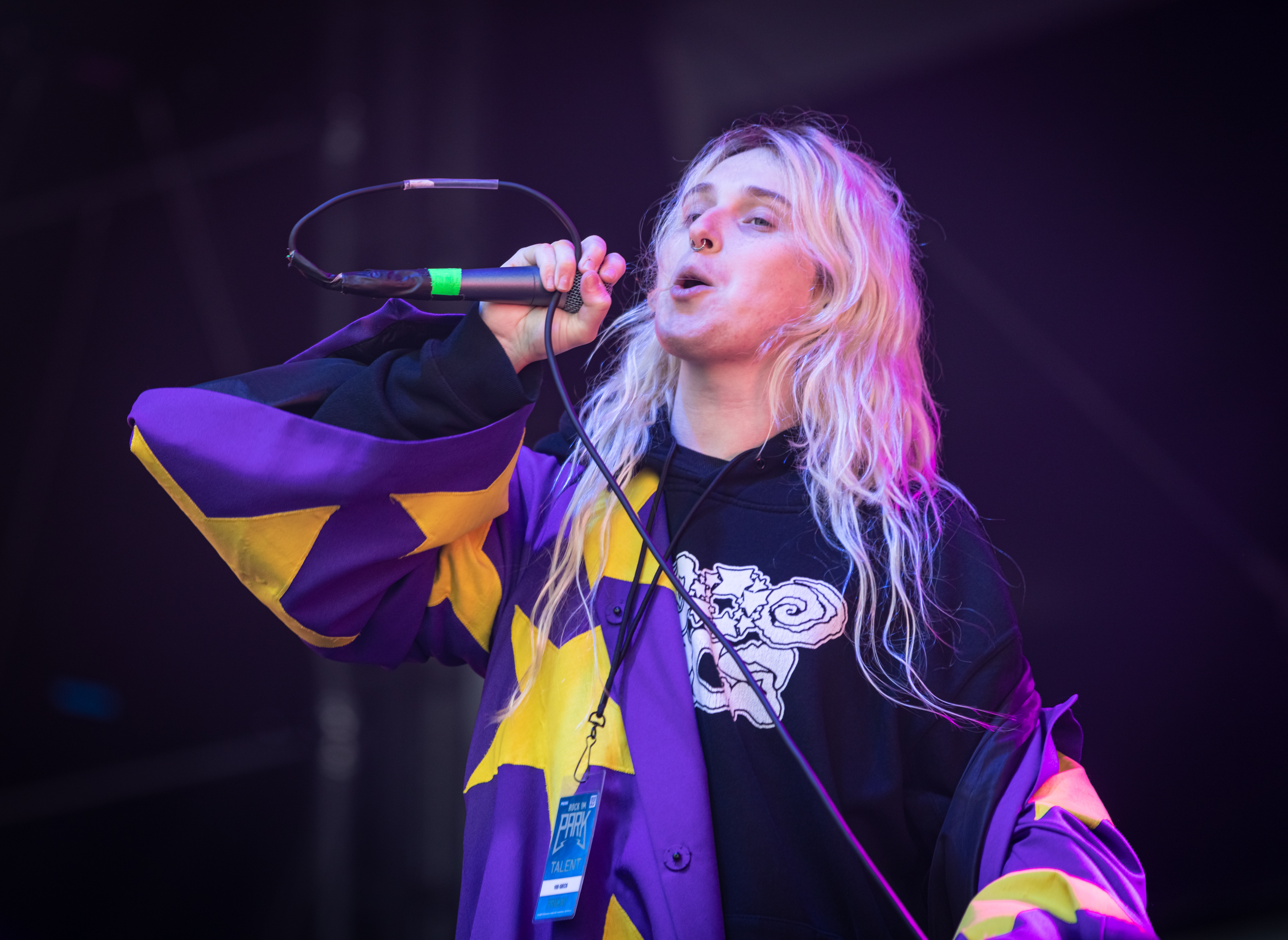
Les performing in 2022

In 2016, Les released the EP, hello kitty skates to the fuckin CEMETARY, which she describes as "a bunch of songs about dead bodies." She subsequently released the 2017 EP, i just dont wanna name it anything with "beach" in the title. In 2018, Les stopped using the osno1 moniker and released a third EP, Big Summer Jams 2018, under her own name. Big Summer Jams 2018 received positive reviews from music critics, praised as "debauched digital celebrations" by Vice and "a blender of fun” by Tiny Mix Tapes.

Les participated in a remix album of Katie Dey's album Mydata in early 2021. In March 2021, Les officially released her solo single "Haunted" following a positive reception from her fanbase after it was previously played during a virtual DJ set in 2020. The song was subsequently featured in season 2 of the HBO series Euphoria.

== Personal life ==
Les has cited being transgender as contributing to her exploration of different singing styles and pitched-up "nightcore style" vocals, which she once used almost exclusively in her music due to her experiences with voice dysphoria. In "How to dress as human" from the album I just dont want to name it anything with "beach" in the title she speaks about her dysphoria and says “I’m never gonna pass, I should stay home, why did I make plans?" However, in a 2021 Pitchfork interview, she revealed she had begun taking vocal lessons and recording new 100 gecs music with unpitched vocals, saying, "As I've been exploring my voice more, I'm like, 'I can do this.'"

She married illustrator and cartoonist Gabe Howell on October 13, 2017. Les lived in Chicago from 2013 to 2020, then moved to Los Angeles with Howell to work more closely with Brady. As of July 2023, Les currently lives in rural Colorado with her girlfriend, May Leitz. On December 2, 2024, Leitz posted on Bluesky that she and Les were engaged.

== Discography ==
=== Extended plays ===
Title	Details
better get sharper; better change yr name	Released: 2015; Label: Self-released; Format: Digital Download
tape 1 - this town makes me sick sometimes	Released: May 26, 2017; Label: Self-released; Format: Digital Download
hello kitty skates to the fuckin CEMETARY	Released: October 2, 2016; Label: Self-released; Format: Digital Download
i just dont wanna name it anything with "beach" in the title	Released: August 16, 2017; Label: Self-released; Format: Digital download
BIG SUMMER JAMS 2018	Released: August 3, 2018; Label: Self-released; Format: Digital download

=== Compilation albums ===
Title	Details
xXsAd_PrOm_ReMiXXz_201666Xx	Released: May 10, 2016; Label: Self-released; Format: Digital Download
LETHAL POISON FOR THE SYSTEM (with Black Dresses and 99jakes)	Released: December 21, 2017; Label: Self-released; Format: Digital Download
REMIXES 2017	Released: January 8, 2018; Label: Self-released; Format: Digital download

=== Singles ===
Title	Year	Certifications	Album
"Haunted"	2021	RIAA: Gold	Non-album single

=== Guest appearances ===
Title	Year	Other artist(s)	Album
"Crossed Out"	2018	Yung Skrrt	Triple Other
"Popular"	2018	Umru	Search Result
"Hard Mode"	2019	Andrew Goes To Hell, forcefeeded	Damage Control
"Pills and Good Advice"	2021	Left at London	T.I.A.P.F.Y.H.

=== Songwriting and production credits ===
Songwriting and production work for other artists
Title	Year	Artist(s)	Album
"Popular"	2018	Umru	Search Result
"Are You Hanging with the Dead Again?"	2018	XEN99	Non-album single
"Let It Out"	2020	Rico Nasty	Nightmare Vacation
"Pussy Poppin"	2020	Rico Nasty	Nightmare Vacation
"Pills and Good Advice"	2021	Left at London	T.I.A.P.F.Y.H.
"Kummer"	2021	Bolboi	Non-album single
"I'm Not Perfect"	2022	Dreewzy	Non-album single
"Wanna Feel Anything Again"	2022	Die Together in Venus	Non-album single

=== Remixes ===
Title	Original artist	Year
"Anymore"	Lil Aaron featuring Kim Petras	2019
"Rich Bitch Juice"	Alice Longyu Gao	2020
"Leaving"	Katie Dey	2021

=== As part of 100 gecs ===
Release	Year
100 Gecs	2016
1000 Gecs	2019
1000 Gecs and the Tree of Clues	2020
Snake Eyes	2022
10,000 Gecs	2023
