= 1000 Gecs =

Studio album by 100 Gecs
- Released: May 31, 2019
- Recorded: 2018–2019
- Genres: Hyperpop; experimental pop
- Length: 23:07
- Label: Dog Show
- Producers: Dylan Brady; Laura Les

100 Gecs chronology
100 gecs (2016)	1000 Gecs (2019)	1000 Gecs and the Tree of Clues (2020)

Singles from 1000 gecs
- 1. "Money Machine" Released: May 29, 2019

1000 Gecs (stylized as 1000 gec on the album cover) is the debut studio album by American hyperpop duo 100 Gecs, released on May 31, 2019, through Dog Show Records. (Note: Considered a self release, as band member Dylan Brady owns Dog Show.) It was preceded by the release of lead single "Money Machine" two days earlier.

Featuring an experimental sound that combined several genres, 1000 Gecs was well received by critics. It placed on several publications' lists of the best albums of 2019. Remixed and reworked versions of songs from 1000 Gecs were later released as part of the follow-up remix album 1000 Gecs and the Tree of Clues (2020).

== Background and release ==
Dylan Brady and Laura Les first met in 2012. They started making music together in the winter of 2015, when Brady met Les in Chicago. There, they officially formed 100 Gecs and worked on their eponymous EP, released the next year. For a time, they both continued to work on their solo releases while also producing for others. In January 2019, they were invited to collaborate on a shared performance at the second edition of the Minecraft Fire Festival, a virtual music festival where Minecraft users gather on a specific server to experience live DJ performances. Brady and Les created several new songs for this set, and the enjoyable experience prompted them to intermittently collaborate throughout the year, eventually accumulating enough material for what later became 1000 gecs. With Brady being in Los Angeles and Les in Chicago, they stated that around 80 percent of the album was done via email, with them sending Logic Pro X files between them. Due to this production method, they were called an extremely online act. According to Brady, they "didn't really talk about what [they] wanted to do"; they would just send files between them, with Brady and Les adding a new element every time. The work on vocals and production was split evenly between the two.

Brady and Les are against labeling the album with a genre as, according to Brady, 1000 gecs is similar to a compilation album: "We're both just fans of music, so that's just what we put on it". Both cited YouTube, Cannibal Corpse, John Zorn and "nightcore as a concept" as some of their strongest influences. In another interview, Brady mentioned that he enjoyed ska and dubstep and cited influences such as Duck Duck Goose, Soulja Boy, Devil Wears Prada, Chiodos, and Paramore. Les recorded her vocals in her closet. Her vocals are exclusively pitched-up, "nightcore style", due to her gender dysphoria, since she couldn't listen to her own voice.

The song "Money Machine" was released as a single from the album on May 29, 2019, with a visualizer for the song posted to YouTube. The song quickly became the duo's most successful and well known song to date, and on June 13, 2019, an official music video for the song was released. In June 2019, the band released official merchandise for the album on the Dog Show Records website. An official music video for the song "800dB Cloud" was released on July 25, 2019. Over a year later, an official music video for "Hand Crushed by a Mallet" was released on October 9, 2020. In August 2019, 100 Gecs released the album's instrumentals, stems, and a cappella vocals for free download.

== Music ==
1000 gecs is a genre-hopping album, generally described by Pitchfork as experimental pop and by Sputnik as bubblegum bass. According to Will Pritchard of The Independent, the album helped to consolidate the eclectic 2010s "hyperpop" style by taking the genre "to its most extreme, and extremely catchy, conclusions: stadium-sized trap beats processed and distorted to near-destruction, overwrought emo vocals and cascades of ravey arpeggios." Some genres used to describe certain songs or parts of the album include post-dubstep, indie pop, pop punk, trance, chiptune, happy hardcore, hip hop, synth-pop, ska, and Europop. The song "xXXi_wud_nvrstøp_ÜXXx" contains an interpolation of "Kiss Me Thru the Phone" by Soulja Boy. Laura Les stated that the song "800db Cloud"'s ending breakdown was influenced by death metal band Cannibal Corpse.

== Album cover ==
The tree featured in the cover art has since become a pilgrimage destination for 100 gecs fans.

== Critical reception ==
Professional ratings
Review scores
Source	Rating
AllMusic	4.5/5 stars
Paste	7.9/10
Pitchfork	7.4/10
Sputnikmusic	3.5/5
Consumer Guide	A−

1000 Gecs received generally positive reviews from critics. Larry Fitzmaurice of Pitchfork gave the album a rating of 7.4 out of 10, calling it "one of the year's most fascinating, exhilarating experimental pop albums". Similarly, Fred Thomas at AllMusic described it as being "jittery, ridiculous, and perpetually short-circuiting" but also "a fine-tuned and controlled pop product."

In December 2019, New York Times music critics Jon Caramanica and Jon Pareles rated 1000 Gecs #1 and #10 respectively in their "Best Albums of 2019" article. 1000 gecs is considered the first mainstream hyperpop album, being responsible for the genre's popularity.

=== Accolades ===
Publication	List	Rank
Crack Magazine	The Top 50 Albums of the Year	25
Jon Caramanica for The New York Times	Best Albums of 2019	1
Jon Pareles for The New York Times	Best Albums of 2019	10
Noisey	The 100 Best Albums of 2019	1
Paper	Top 20 Albums of 2019	6
Pitchfork	The 50 Best Albums of 2019	42
PopMatters	The 70 Best Albums of 2019	50
Rolling Stone	The 50 Best Albums of 2019	19
Stereogum	The 50 Best Albums of 2019	27

== Track listing ==
All tracks are written by Dylan Brady and Laura Les.

No.	Title	Length
1.	"745 Sticky"	2:21
2.	"Money Machine"	1:54
3.	"800db Cloud"	2:20
4.	"I Need Help Immediately"	1:22
5.	"Stupid Horse"	2:02
6.	"xXXi_wud_nvrstøp_üXXx"	2:55
7.	"Ringtone"	2:24
8.	"GecGecGec"	2:24
9.	"Hand Crushed by a Mallet"	2:07
10.	"Gec 2 Ü"	3:18
Total length:		23:07

All songs are stylized in lowercase, except for "I Need Help Immediately".

== Personnel ==
100 Gecs

- Dylan Brady
- Laura Les

Artwork

- Gabe Howell – photography
- Nic John – photography
- Mira Joyce – graphic design

== Charts ==
Chart (2019–20)	Peak position
US Top Current Albums (Billboard)	94
US Heatseekers Albums (Billboard)	7
US Independent Albums (Billboard)	36
