= Stardust (Danny Brown album) =

2025 studio album by Danny Brown

Studio album by Danny Brown
- Released: November 7, 2025
- Genres: EDM; digicore; hip house; hyperpop; experimental hip-hop; pop rap
- Length: 49:31
- Languages: English; Polish; Ukrainian
- Label: Warp
- Producers: Cynthoni; DJH; Femtanyl; Frost Children; Holly; Jane Remover; Johnnascus; Nnamdï; Quadeca; Rye Mann; Umru; Underscores

Danny Brown chronology
Quaranta (2023)	Stardust (2025)

Singles from Stardust
- 1. "Starburst" Released: September 23, 2025; 2. "Copycats" Released: October 16, 2025

Stardust is the sixth studio album by American rapper Danny Brown. It was released on November 7, 2025, through Warp Records. The album features EDM and hyperpop-inspired production, marking a stylistic departure from his 2023 albums Quaranta and Scaring the Hoes (with JPEGMafia). Stardust features guest appearances and production contributions from a younger generation of artists, including Quadeca, Jane Remover, Underscores, Frost Children, and Femtanyl.

In 2023, Brown went to rehab for alcoholism and became sober for the first time, initially planning to retire from music before rekindling his interest through listening to hyperpop duo 100 gecs. While Brown had previously experimented with electronic music on Old (2013), he initially struggled to connect with the genre in his new sobriety. His perspective shifted after discovering newer artists, including Underscores and her studio album Wallsocket (2023). Although Brown would work with Dylan Brady of 100 gecs and PC Music founder A. G. Cook, their musical direction diverged. He instead took an interest in the digicore scene, where he met his personal A&R, DeadAir Records founder Jesse Taconelli.

When production of Stardust began, Taconelli suggested Brown should envision the album through the lens of an alter ego. Brown expanded on this concept by creating Dusty Star, a fictional '90s-era popstar. He was inspired further by Angel Prost of hyperpop duo Frost Children, who recorded spoken word interludes throughout the album as fan mail that inspires Dusty Star. Encouraged by folktronica musician Quadeca, Brown also relearned how to write songs through Julia Cameron's self-help book The Artist's Way (1992) and its outline of a 12-week program. As his first album recorded while sober, Stardust explores themes of purpose, regret, braggadocio, and gratitude.

To promote the album, Brown released the lead single "Starburst" on September 23, 2025, and the second single "Copycats" (featuring Underscores) on October 16, 2025. He embarked on a North American concert tour from November to December 2025, with Underscores and Femtanyl as opening acts. Upon release, Stardust received mixed to positive reviews from music critics, who praised the album's narrative and guest features while criticizing its inconsistency. Commercially, the album charted on Billboard's Top Dance Albums, the North American College and Community Radio Chart, three UK charts and the Scottish Albums chart.

== Background ==
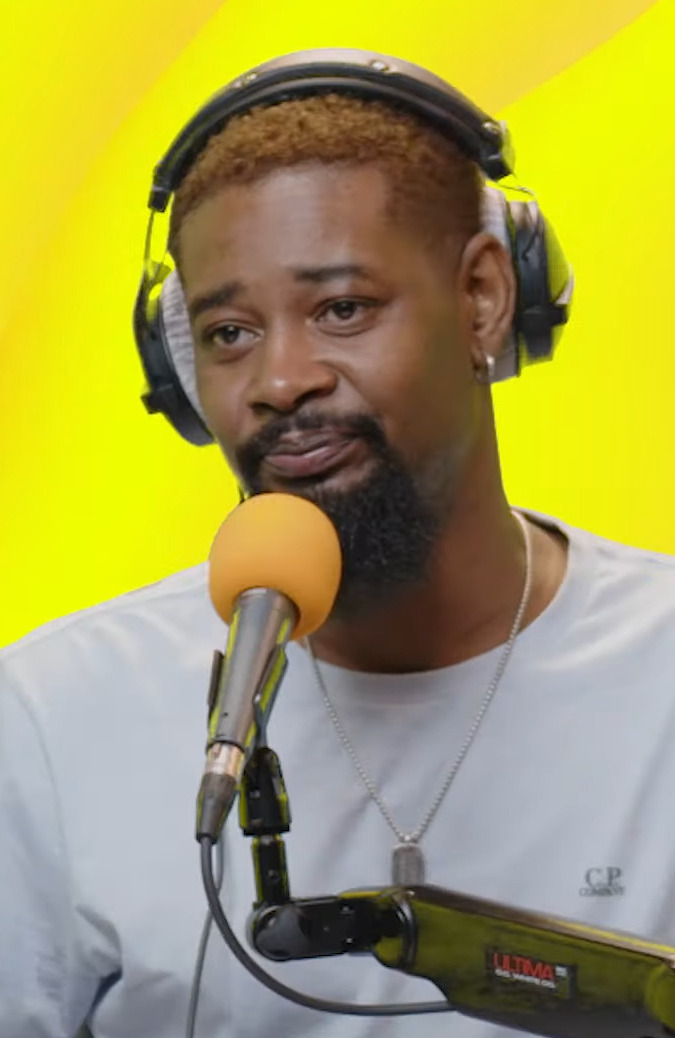
Brown hosting his podcast The Danny Brown Show in 2022, around the time he was recording Scaring the Hoes and Quaranta (both 2023)

The album is Brown's first since getting sober after a 2023 stint in rehab for alcoholism, which he checked into after heavy spending on alcohol and drugs during the COVID-19 pandemic. By then, Brown had released a collaborative album with JPEGMafia titled Scaring the Hoes (2023) and a solo studio album titled Quaranta (2023). Discussing the production of the two albums, he revealed that he was "blackout drunk" when recording Scaring the Hoes and was in constant pain and throwing up when recording Quaranta. Brown initially planned to retire from music when he boarded his flight to rehab, telling NME that he dealt with self-hatred during that period, making it difficult for him to love anything else. Reflecting on his time in rehab, Brown said it was the most isolated he had been since his eight-month incarceration in jail as a teenager. While there, he rekindled his interest in music, listening to the hyperpop duo 100 gecs every day for eight weeks.

Throughout 2024 and 2025, Brown began frequently collaborating with artists in the alternative pop, hyperpop, electronic, digicore, and deconstructed club scenes, including Alice Longyu Gao, Frost Children, Jane Remover, 8485, and Femtanyl. He also joined Underscores and A. G. Cook as a special guest during their Coachella performances, where Brown and Underscores previewed a new song. In a 2024 interview with Ringtone Mag, Brown elaborated on his admiration for hyperpop music and its performers and confirmed the presence of featured artists on his upcoming album. On his podcast, The Danny Brown Show, Brown described the sound of his upcoming album as "the most different music I ever did" and said the sound would "shock" people. He also expressed a desire for perfectionism on the album as his first release after getting sober, wanting to disprove claims that the quality of his music would decline in sobriety.

== Writing and production ==
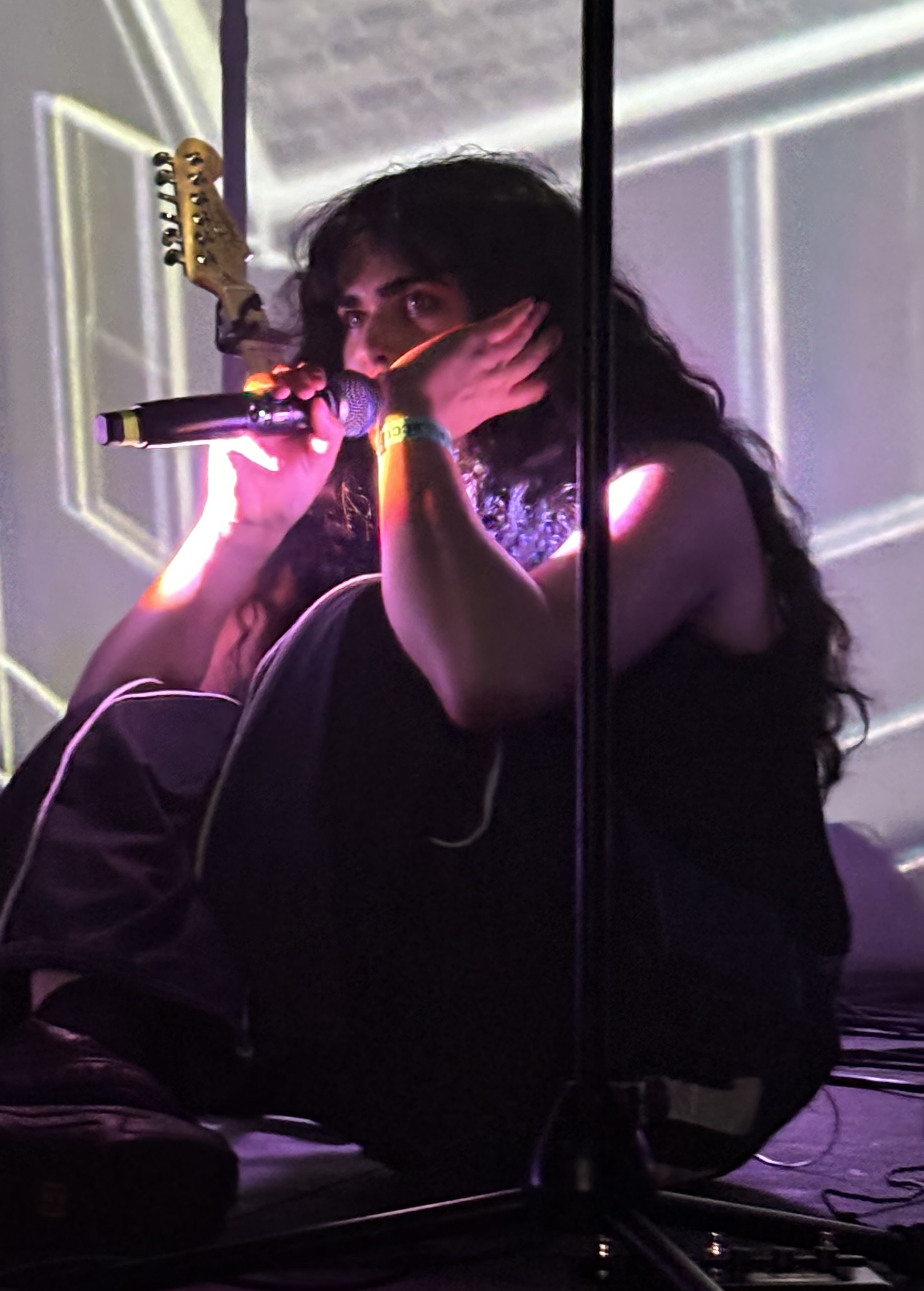
Brown credited Underscores' album Wallsocket (2023) for rekindling his interest in electronic music.

When Brown resumed producing electronic music, having last done "EDM trap bangers" on his second studio album Old (2013), he struggled to reconnect with the style due to his new sober lifestyle, as EDM often involves themes of partying and drug use. Brown feared that the quality of his music would decline after seeing various artists suffer the same fate upon reaching sobriety. After Brown left rehab, his phone's algorithm had changed, leading him to discover new artists such as Underscores and giving him a new perspective on electronic music. During that time, he found solace in her second studio album, Wallsocket (2023), which he connected to his experience in rehab and credited with helping him "fall back in love with music". He was further inspired when fans reached out to tell him his music had helped them get sober. While he first explored hyperpop with a Dorian Electra collaboration in 2021, he recalled discovering Sophie's 2014 song "Bipp", believing it was "where grime was gonna go next". He reflected that he would have collaborated with Sophie if Vince Staples had not already taken the initiative. Dealing with the lost opportunity, he wrote the mantra "Make Sophie proud" in his notebooks. During that period, Electra introduced him to the Subculture Party series, held in Los Angeles and streamed online.

Although Brown initially worked with Dylan Brady of 100 gecs and PC Music founder A. G. Cook, he felt like their musical directions did not align and instead became interested in the digicore wave, taking an interest in working with DeadAir Records founder Jesse Taconelli and signee Jane Remover. Taconelli served as Brown's "personal A&R" and influenced his creative process on Stardust, suggesting he create a character. Brown named the alter ego "Dusty Star", likening it to Prince's album Purple Rain (1984) and its accompanying film. Brown explained that Quaranta serves as a prequel to Stardust, with the latter album taking the perspective of a "90s era popstar". Brown first met the hyperpop duo Frost Children at a studio in Austin, after congratulating them on their track "Flatline" appearing on a FIFA soundtrack; this meeting became the first recording session for Stardust. Working with Angel Prost of the duo early in the album's production, Brown was inspired to develop the character further. When he asked Prost to record a poem for the album, Brown grew attached to her verse. He explained that Prost's poems are "love letters that convince Dusty Star to come back to music", with the character initially being interested in money but finding purpose by the album's conclusion.

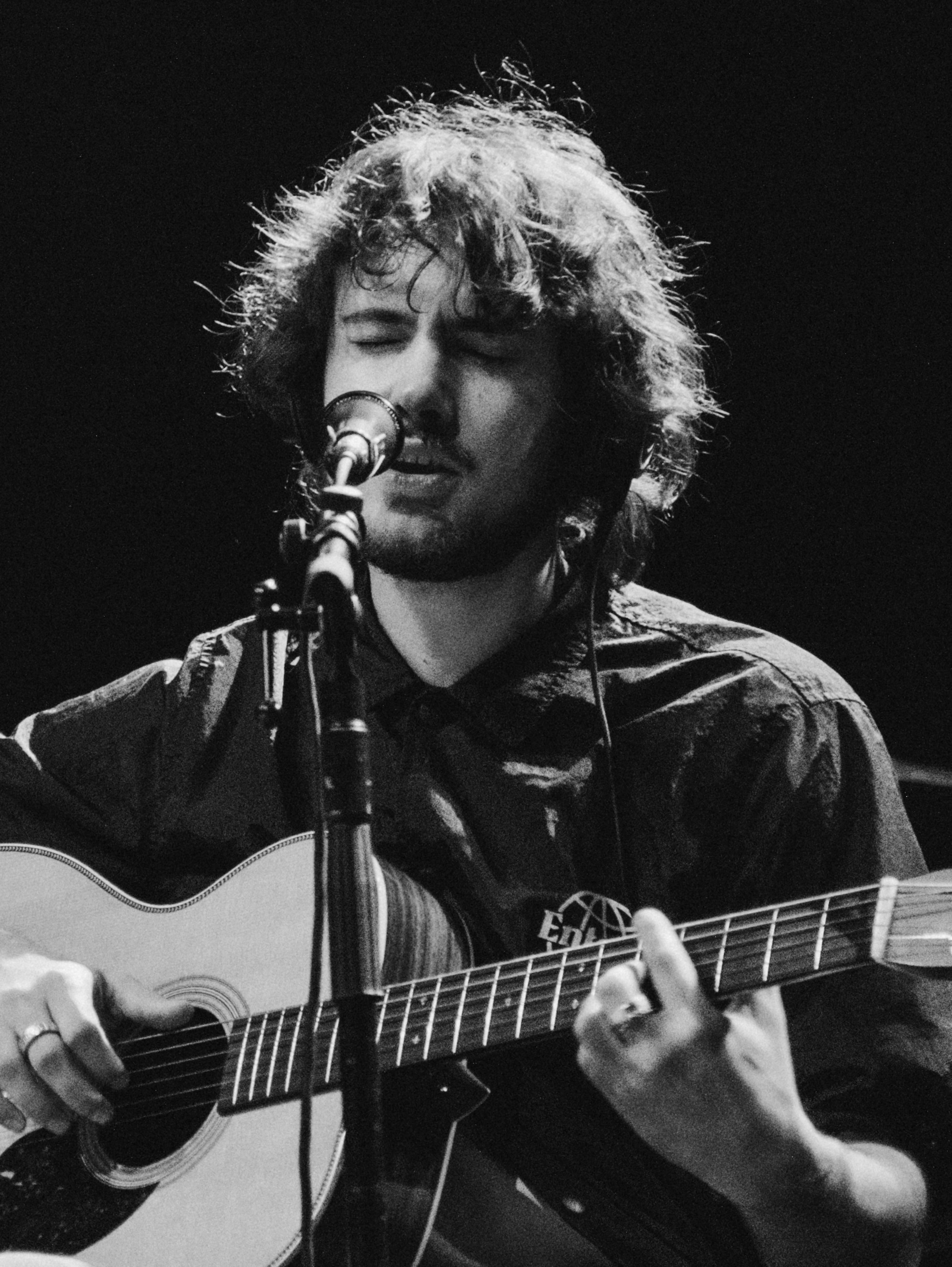
Previous collaborator Quadeca encouraged Brown to relearn how to write songs with Julia Cameron's The Artist's Way (1992), in which Quadeca would produce for Brown to write verses.

As Brown developed Stardust, he realized he had to relearn how to write songs. He discovered Julia Cameron's 1992 self-help book The Artist's Way, which assists readers in harnessing their creative talents and building self-confidence; he appreciated it more upon learning it was inspired by Cameron's journey to recovery from addiction. During the 12-week program, he wrote "morning pages" and took himself on "artist's dates". His progress was encouraged by folktronica musician Quadeca, with whom he did recording sessions with for a week. Quadeca would produce a beat and hand Brown a demo, which Brown would listen to for a few hours before sleeping. When he woke up, he wrote his verses in ten minutes, reflecting that his creativity had been "bottled up for so long". Brown had previously collaborated with Quadeca on the track "House Settling" from Quadeca's third studio album, I Didn't Mean to Haunt You (2022).

In 2023, Brown expressed interest in Femtanyl's music when he posted a screenshot on X of their EP Chaser (2023). Within a few months, they met at a studio in Austin. Juno of Femtanyl recalled the experience as "stressful and intimidating", but Brown's playfulness eased Juno's anxiety, encouraging the duo to experiment with ideas such as elongating a vocal sample. Prior to this collaboration, Femtanyl had mainly been noticed in furry fandom communities online. Underscores reflected on this aspect of the album's development, saying that Brown sought out artists with followings as small as 300 monthly listeners. When Juno and Noelle Mansbridge of Femtanyl later saw the tracklist, they recognized the names of Frost Children, Underscores, and Jane Remover as artists who shared their taste in EDM and hyperpop, making them feel affirmed by the opportunity.

During a November 2025 interview with Billboard, Brown revealed that the album's title Stardust originally meant nothing to him. He had taken inspiration from an image of stardust while attending U2's U2:UV Achtung Baby Live at Sphere residency in Las Vegas. After photographing it, he researched the word "stardust", but was initially hesitant to use it as Yung Lean had already released a mixtape titled Stardust (2022), and David Bowie had used the alter ego Ziggy Stardust. Brown decided to title the album Stardust after reflecting on his regrets over not collaborating with Sophie. He was later told that "stardust" is also slang for cocaine, though disavowed the connection.

== Music and lyrics ==
=== Overview ===
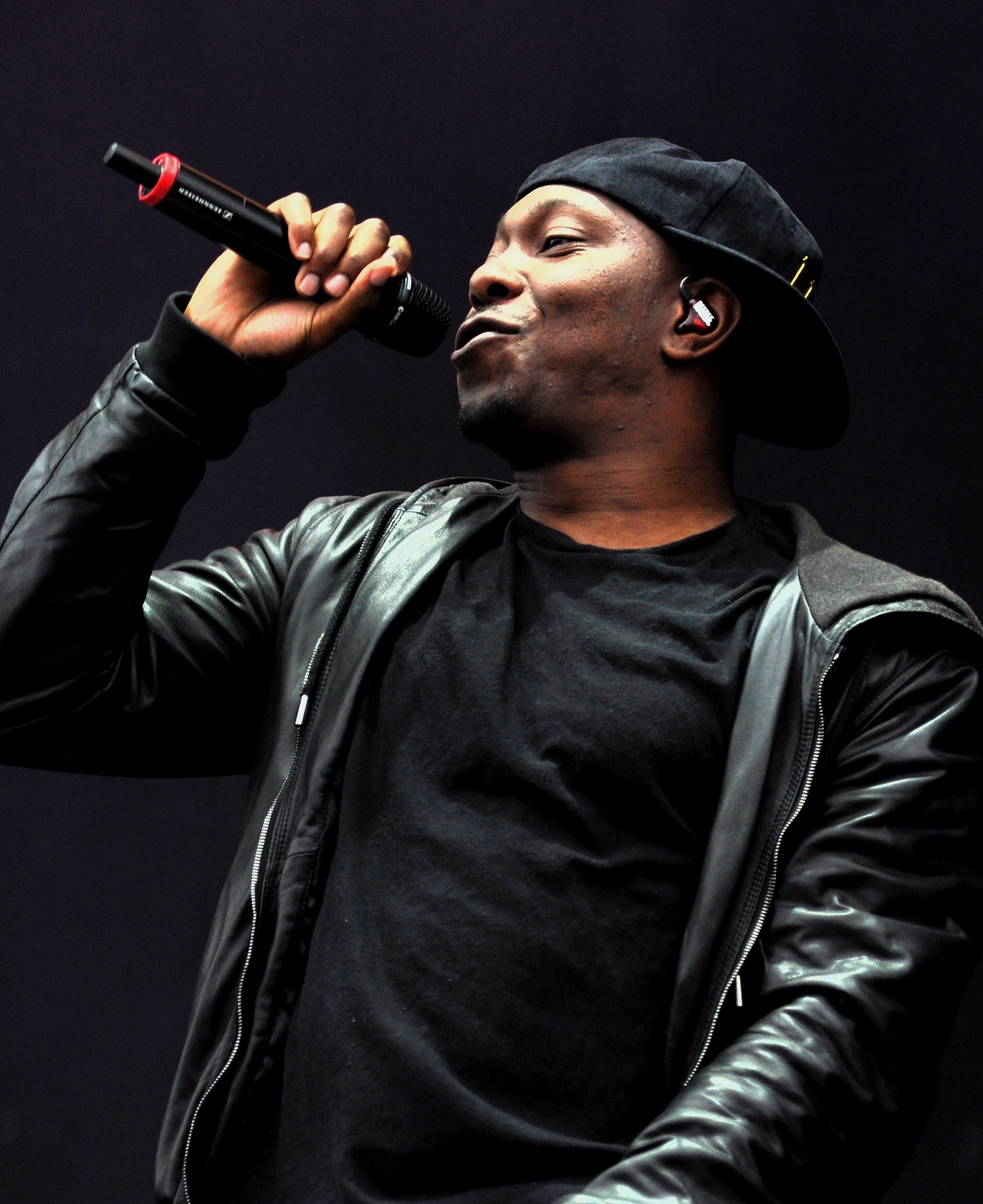
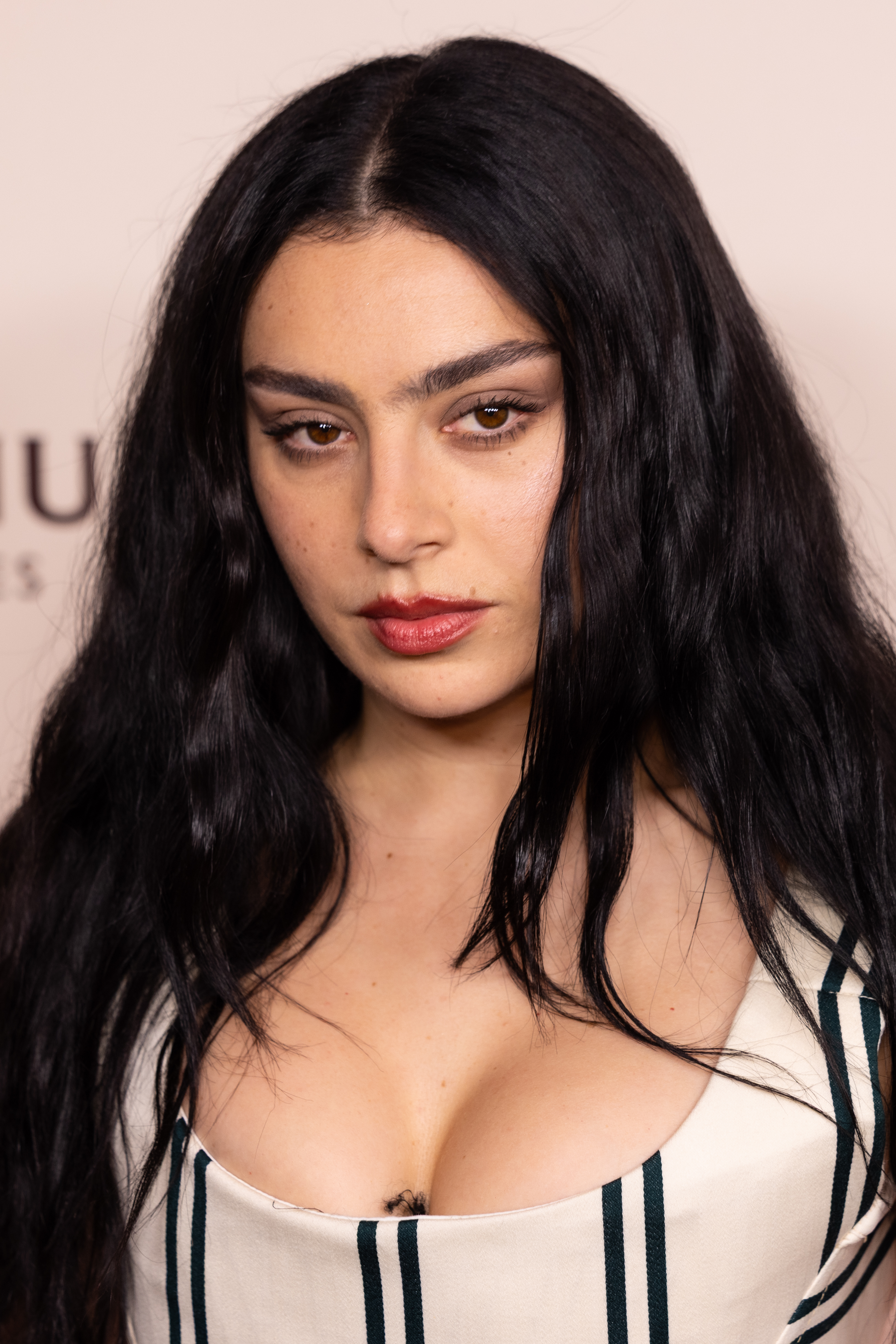
Several music critics have compared the album's production to Dizzee Rascal's grime and Charli XCX's hyperpop, specifically on the tracks "Copycats", "Baby", and "All4U".

Stardust is an EDM and hip-hop album that explores territory in hyperpop, digicore, drum and bass, and hip house. It is Brown's first album written and recorded entirely sober. Unlike Brown's previous releases, the album's guest list spans a younger generation of artists from "digi-hardcore, EDM, future bass" territory with a queer following. With a runtime of forty-nine minutes and thirty-one seconds, the album features guest appearances by Quadeca, Underscores, Frost Children, Jane Remover, 8485, Johnnascus, Issbrokie, Femtanyl, Nnamdï, Ukraïnka, Zheani, and Cythoni. Only the tracks "Starburst" and "Lift You Up" feature no guest artists.

In a November 2025 interview with NME, Brown detailed his approach to creating Stardust, using the album to narrate his recovery from addiction and his rediscovery of joy in art. He explored these themes through the lens of a semi-autobiographical character named Dusty Star, a fictional '90s-era pop star serving as both a self-parody and a self-portrait. Brown further elaborated on the role of Frost Children member Angel Prost's spoken word interludes throughout the album, comparing them to fan mail that inspires Dusty, while she cautions him and helps him find his purpose. Additionally, Brown explained how the music of his collaborators on the album had been a source of inspiration and relief during his time in rehab.

Compared to Quaranta's themes of loneliness and torment, all but two tracks on Stardust feature guest stars associated with niche music genres through "thrills and sugar-fueled adrenaline", ranging from Quadeca's "dense, artsy folktronica" to Cynthoni's "depressive, expansive drum-and-bass" production to Underscores's "cheeky and nostalgic synth-pop". According to Karen Singh of Clash, while Quaranta serves a "spiritual bookend" to Brown's XXX (2011), Stardust acts as a continuation of Old (2013). The album draws on a wide palette of influences, including "grime-meets-Charli XCX glitchiness", "classic deep house", "pastoral electronica", and "post-Sophie industrial". Lyrically, when Brown is not reflecting on his past, his themes consist of braggadocio and humorous one-liners, ranging from Brave New World (1932) by Aldous Huxley to Winona Ryder's 2001 shoplifting charge, melding "DIY beatmaking with the raw, live energy of a hardcore show". Brown considered Stardust his "easiest album" to make, as he focused on writing while the producers managed the hooks.

=== Tracks 1–7 ===
"Starburst"
The first half of "Starburst", where Brown raps about paranoia made with humorous punchlines.

"Copycats"
"Copycats", a "club-ready earworm", shows Brown portraying a braggadocious villain, while Underscores repeats her chorus in the deconstructed club track.

The opening track, "Book of Daniel" begins with "soft guitar and shimmering synths" under an introspective and atmospheric tone. The song features dreamy hooks from Quadeca, who presents Brown with a sense of purpose. Lyrically, Brown raps about survival, purpose, and self-discipline while retaining his signature humor and surrealism; he notably names himself and his past collaborators, Kendrick Lamar and Earl Sweatshirt, as the "real big three" of modern hip-hop. The second track, "Starburst", produced by electronica artist Holly, is a two-part industrial hip-hop track that serves as a manifesto. Over a "looping synth" beat, Brown raps about paranoia before the instrumental shifts to a heavy bass and near siren-like melody. He delivers humorous punchlines such as "I ponder going bonkers and knocking out your chompers" to describe mental health collapse and financial hustle. The track concludes with a spoken-word outro from Angel Prost, who reintroduces the Dusty Star character in a segment acting as "part love letter" and "part hallucination".

The third track, "Copycats", a deconstructed club and electropop track, reflects Charli XCX's hyperpop 2024 album Brat mixed with techno-inspired Detroit bass, produced by and featuring Underscores. Driven by a "squelchy bass, glitchcore blips and boops, and chiptune synths", it is a "club-ready earworm". Brown plays the role of a braggadocious villain aiming at imitators: "Get what you want, not what you ask for... choose my path to walk, the straight narrow", while Underscores repeats the catchy hook "rap star, pop star, rock star / Gimme that". According to Underscores, she and Brown finished the song in just a few hours, and she revealed that his verse name-checked some of her older songs. The nearly drumless fourth track, "1999", is a "painfully trebly, glitching chiptune". Featuring screamo-style vocals from industrial Texas-based artist Johnnascus, the song draws similarities to German digital hardcore band Atari Teenage Riot. In contrast to the first three tracks, it is more screechy and confrontational.

The fifth track, "Flowers", is a trance-rap and electropop song featuring 8485, whose "bubblegum melody" floats on deep synths as Brown eschews self-mythology in favor of supporting his friends and fans. Thematically, the lions that once represented his troubles now become symbols of survival, with Brown rapping about becoming one and stalking his prey. The track plays on the phrase "getting your flowers", with the refrain "I'm going to get more than my flowers" emphasizing the idea of owning his artistry. The sixth track, "Lift You Up", is a groovy, 1990s-style house song track that shows Brown slowing his delivery on a beat built on clipped drums and whirring synths. The writing of the track was inspired by Brown spending time in the gym. The seventh track, "Green Light", is a hyperpop track that pairs Brown's high-pitched yelps with the Frost Children's harmonies over a mix of EDM and punk, reminiscent of the production of the Swedish cloud rap collective Drain Gang.

=== Tracks 8–14 ===
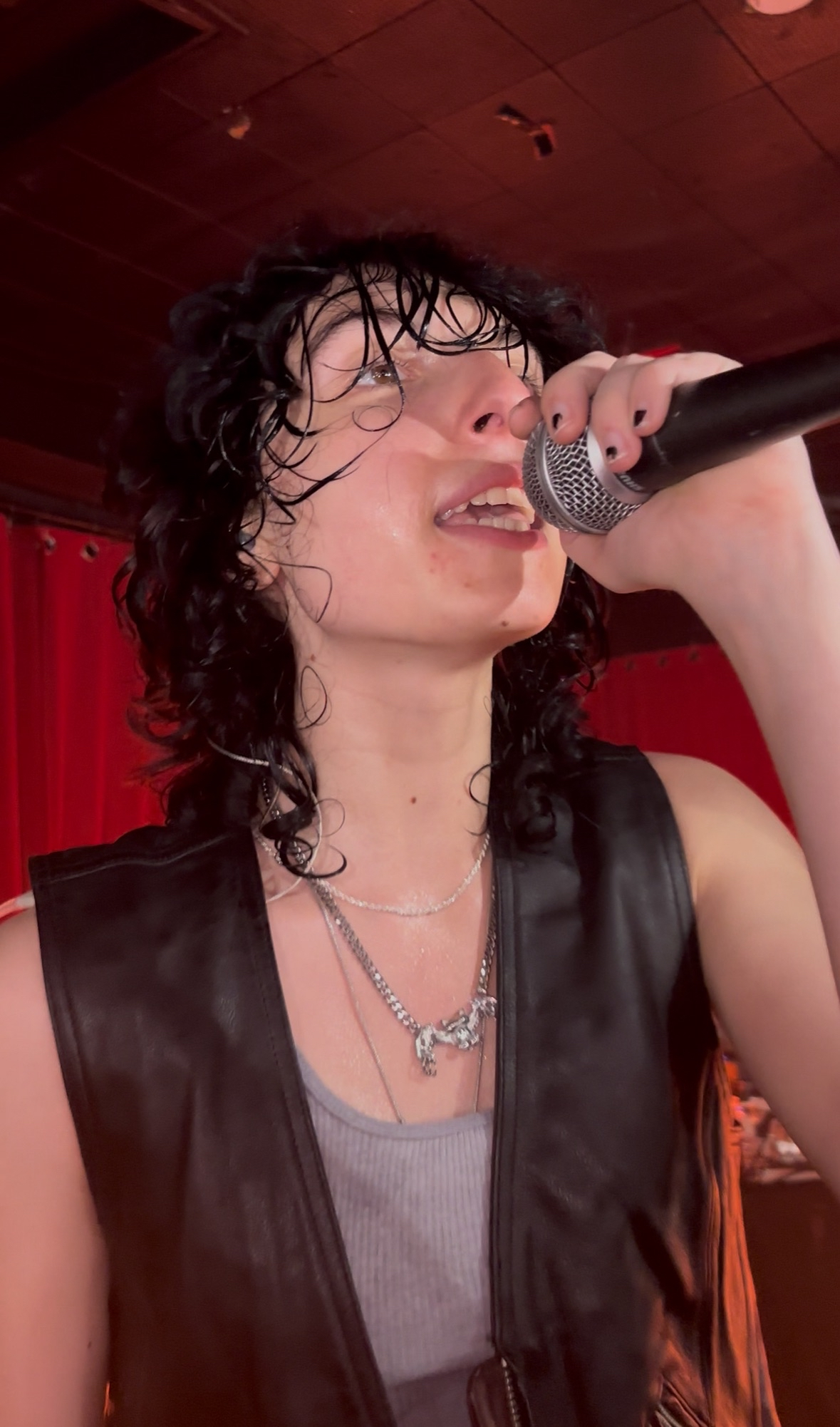
"All4U" features production from frequent digicore collaborator Jane Remover, who also sampled a track from their album Revengeseekerz (2025).

The eighth track, "What You See", serves as a jazzier contrast to "Green Light" and features Quadeca. Over melancholy keys, Brown raps about self-esteem, lust, and infidelity, acknowledging having hurt his loved ones and attempting to compensate for it, ultimately revealing that love was what liberated him. The ninth track, "Baby", featuring Underscores, takes inspiration from Dizzee Rascal's grime production, specifically the "double claps, helium-high squeaks", and "car-speaker basslines" of his 2003 track "I Luv U". The tenth track, "Whatever the Case", is a trap metal, industrial hip-hop, and deconstructed club song featuring California rapper Issbrokie. It flips positivity into mania over happy hardcore loops. Issbrokie met Brown after he liked one of her Instagram posts and requested her appearance on the album. In an interview with The Fader, she jokingly described her verse as "pure ignorance, bullshit that spewed from my brain", referencing Bad Dragon, Kreayshawn, Buffy the Vampire Slayer, and Tyler Perry. Reflecting on the collaboration, she noted that Brown was "super accommodating" and did not request any revisions.

The eleventh track, "1L0v3MyL1f3!", features Femtanyl and finds Brown reflecting on his sober journey over drum and bass and jungle production, with a beat resembling a "happy hardcore track on a turntable with a knackered stylus". Brown shouts about loving his life over the glitching instrumental, while Femtanyl's vocals delivers "high-pitched exclamations" rejecting the high expectations from others. The song concludes with a sampled excerpt of Steve Albini from a live Shellac performance. The twelfth track, "Right From Wrong", features Nnamdï, where Brown admits his regrets in a sense of morality without confession. For example, he delivers advice such as "Continue on a journey and focus on what's ahead, 'cause they run with the lies when the truth ain't got legs". Meanwhile, the instrumental experiments with tempo, switching between "double-time and slow-crawl flows" to add depth to the album's emotional arc.

"The End"
The first part of "The End", where Brown raps about his dark past on a drum and bass instrumental.

The thirteenth track, "The End", is described as a three-part, "nine-minute epic" produced by and featuring Australian breakcore artist Cynthoni, alongside Polish indie-pop artist Ta Ukraïnka and Australian musician Zheani. The track starts with Brown rapping about regrets from his addiction, recounting the drugs and alcohol that served as his coping mechanisms over gentle piano production and hushed vocals before a dramatic shift into breakcore. It then features verses in Polish and Ukrainian from Ta Ukraïnka about her own struggles with mental health, which reference Brown's album Atrocity Exhibition (2016). The second part, also produced by Cynthoni, features Brown rapping about regaining his motivation and passion, as well as working through his problems, while Zheani provides the chorus. Zheani's mellow vocals complement Brown's "warp-speed flow" as the "backing track's pillowy synths and gentle piano figures" blend into a drum and bass beat. Brown looks ahead optimistically over jungle breaks, closing with a promise to "never see the end of me". The last two minutes of the track feature a spoken word segment from Prost, the longest on the album, accompanied by guitar instrumentation from Quadeca. The fourteenth and final track, "All4U", produced by and featuring Jane Remover, serves as Brown's declaration of gratitude on a futuristic R&B-style song reminiscent of Charli XCX's emotive tracks such as "Track 10" (2017) and "Forever" (2020). On the track, Remover also sampled their own song "Twice Removed" (2025).

== Promotion and release ==
On September 23, 2025, Brown officially announced Stardust alongside the release of its lead single, "Starburst", an accompanying music video directed by the duo DEAD HORSES, featuring beats by Portuguese DJ Holly. as well as promotional and cover photos by Ariel Fisher featuring design by Maria Chiamoro. That same day, he revealed a 21-date North American concert in November and December 2025, featuring Underscores and Femtanyl as opening acts. Brown released the second single, "Copycats" (featuring Underscores), on October 16. Its music video premiered twelve days later, depicting the duo in an entourage taking selfies and living a flashy lifestyle. Stardust was released to streaming and as a digital download through Warp Records on November 7, 2025. Shortly after, on November 18, Brown announced a European concert tour scheduled for March 2026, except for a London concert in August. Physical editions of the album on vinyl and CD were subsequently issued on February 20, 2026.

== Reception ==
Professional ratings
Aggregate scores
Source	Rating
AnyDecentMusic?	7.4/10
Metacritic	77/100
Review scores
Source	Rating
AllMusic	4.5/5 stars
Clash	7/10
DIY	4/5 stars
Exclaim!	8/10
The Guardian	4/5 stars
NME	4/5 stars
Paste	7.8/10
Pitchfork	6.7/10
Rolling Stone	3/5 stars
The Skinny	4/5 stars
Slant Magazine	4/5 stars

According to the review aggregator Metacritic, Stardust received "generally favorable reviews" based on a weighted average score of 77 out of 100 from 19 critic scores. Anthony Fantano of The Needle Drop rated the album a "light 8", complimenting its production and Brown's approach to music following sobriety. Jake Hawkes of Dork gave it a positive review, describing it as "not a perfect album", but calling it his "most complete and best work to date". Randy from Shatter the Standards praised the album for deepening Brown's legacy and his decision to rebuild himself as a hyperpop artist. Hip Hop Golden Age credited the album for Brown's curation of chaos and its choice of persistence over perfection. Karen Singh of Clash complimented the album's production and dynamics; though she did not consider it a memorable bundle, she credited the stamina that highlighted the experience, demonstrating "opulence, distortion and dynamism" as valuable elements alongside "tasteful chord progression or animated arrangements". Wesley McLean of Exclaim! praised the album, considering it to be Brown's strongest since UKnoWhatImSayin? (2019) and a "concise, confident, and encouraging body of work" that continues to inspire fans. Nick Seip of Slant also called the album a companion piece to Brown's album Old (2013), noting similar themes of fame, isolation, doubt, and self-confidence.

Alexis Petridis of The Guardian positively reviewed the album and examined Brown's journey, noting its mid-track switches between "pop mode" and chaos. Kyann-Sian Williams of NME wrote that Stardust represents "survival in motion" by confronting the past and moving on to a new path "while refusing to let the edge that defines him slip away". Konstantios Pappis of Our Culture Mag commented that the album feeds off the energy of cutting-edge, hyperpop-adjacent musicians who are the reason Brown fell back in love with music. Leor Gill of Chicago Reader considered Brown's "adenoidal rapping" to be more than a match for the album's digital din, proving what happens when Brown uses a new source of energy and "decides to see where it leads him". Jack Donnins of student newspaper Penn State Student Media credited Brown's glitchcore and hyperpop influence, but saw several of its tracks as flat, considering the project uneven. Kieran Press-Reynolds of Pitchfork interpreted the album as a comeback story from a "former junkie" to "recovered and reborn", calling Stardust a love letter to rap and those who inspired Brown to create again, while considering it a "little saccharine".

Matthew Kim of The Line of Best Fit highlighted Brown's excitement and enjoyment in creating Stardust away from addiction and depression, but commented that its unrestrained nature as "losing its grip", condensing several albums' worth of ideas into a single project that is not entirely consistent. While Grant Sharples of Paste pointed to Brown's reinvention and versatility, he noted that the area where the album falls short are Prost's spoken-word interludes, criticizing them for their "clunky phrasing". Lewis Vade of The Skinny also wrote that not all tracks cohesively fit the album, feeling as if Brown was featured on someone else's song rather than vice versa, especially criticizing the track "Green Light". Tom Johnson of Beats Per Minute wrote that there are parts of the album that sounded a "tad samey" and could have been left out. Stephen Kearse of Rolling Stone had a mixed perception on the album, considering that Brown's writing was not "consistently vivid" and that the album's "repeated phrasing flattens his journey", finding no principle beyond its glossy aesthetic.

=== Commercial performance ===
Upon release, Stardust reached number 25 on the Billboard Top Dance Albums, and peaked at number 20 on the North American College and Community Radio Chart for the week of December 2, 2025. Following its physical release on CD and vinyl, it entered three UK album charts, peaking at number three on R&B Albums, number 24 on Independent Albums, and number 66 on Albums Sales. It additionally reached number 80 on the Scottish Albums chart.

== Track listing ==
No.	Title	Writer(s)	Producer(s)	Length
1.	"Book of Daniel" (with Quadeca)	Daniel Sewell; Benjamin Fernando Barajas Lasky; Johnny May; Miles Martin	Quadeca	3:27
2.	"Starburst"	Sewell; Miguel Oliveira; Angel Prost	Holly	4:58
3.	"Copycats" (with Underscores)	Sewell; April Harper Grey	Underscores	2:51
4.	"1999" (with Johnnascus)	Sewell; Johnny Thompson	Johnnascus	2:31
5.	"Flowers" (with 8485)	Sewell; 8485; Oliveira	Holly	2:32
6.	"Lift You Up"	Sewell; Oliveira; A. Prost	Holly	3:32
7.	"Green Light" (with Frost Children)	Sewell; Lulu Prost; Umru Rothenberg	Frost Children; Umru	2:48
8.	"What You See" (with Quadeca)	Sewell; Noah Ehler; Lasky; Johan Lenox; Martin	Quadeca	3:44
9.	"Baby" (with Underscores)	Sewell; Grey	Underscores	3:03
10.	"Whatever the Case" (with Issbrokie)	Sewell; Oliveira; Stephanie Rezendes	Holly	2:28
11.	"ILoveMyLife!" (with Femtanyl)	Sewell; Noelle Stockwood	Femtanyl	3:21
12.	"Right from Wrong" (with Nnamdï)	Sewell; Paul Heron; Nnamdï Ogbonnaya; A. Prost; Rothenberg	Nnamdï; Umru; DJH	3:08
13.	"The End" (with Ta Ukraїnka, Zheani, and Cynthoni)	Sewell; Autumn Beviacqua; Anastasiia Ivakhnenko; June; Ryan Klenk; Lasky; A. Prost; Zheani Sparkes; Chika Ueda; Eli Winter	Quadeca; Cynthoni; Rye Mann	8:43
14.	"All4U" (with Jane Remover)	Sewell; Jane Remover	Jane Remover	2:25
Total length:				49:31

=== Note ===
- "ILoveMyLife!" is stylized "1l0v3myl1f3!".
- "Right from Wrong" is stylized in all caps.

== Personnel ==
Credits were adapted from Tidal.

- Danny Brown – vocals
- Geoff Swan – mixing
- Lewis Chapman – immersive mixing
- Tatsuya Seto – mastering
- Benjamin Fernando Barajas Lasky – vocals, guitar, synthesizer, mixing (1, 8); drums, drum machine (1); production (1, 8, 13); bass (8); engineering (13)
- Myles Martin – drums (1, 8)
- Johnny May – piano (1)
- Miguel Oliveira – production (2, 5, 6, 10)
- Angel Prost – vocals (2, 6, 7, 12, 13); production (7)
- April Harper Grey – vocals, production (3, 9)
- Johnny Thompson – vocals, production (4)
- 8485 – vocals (5)
- Lulu Prost – vocals (7)
- Umru Rothenberg – production (7, 12)
- Johan Lenox – piano (8)
- Noah Ehler – strings (8)
- Stephanie Rezendes – vocals (10)
- Noelle Stockwood – vocals, production (11)
- Phillip Andre Mueller – production (12)
- Nnamdï Ogbonnaya – vocals, production (12)
- Anastasiia Ivakhnenko – vocals (13)
- Cynthoni – vocals, production (13)
- Autumn Beviacqua – composer (13)
- Eli Winter – guitar (13)
- June – composer (13)
- Rye Mann – production (13)
- Olēka – flute (13)
- Chika Ueda – composer (13)
- Zheani Sparkes – vocals (13)
- Ryan Stephen Klenk – composer (13)
- Jane Remover – vocals, production (14)

== Charts ==
Chart (2025–2026)	Peak position
Scottish Albums (Official Charts)	80
UK Albums Sales (OCC)	66
UK Independent Albums (Official Charts)	24
UK R&B Albums (Official Charts)	3
US Top Dance Albums (Billboard)	25
US & Canadian College Radio Top 200 (NACC)	21
