= Worldwide Torture =

EP by Jazmin Bean
- Released: 22 October 2019
- Studio: Octagon (Brixton)
- Genres: Alternative pop; electropop; electronic rock; heavy metal; hyperpop; nu metal
- Length: 15:50
- Label: Aswang Birthday Cake
- Producers: Dave Draper; Dougal Drummond; Kristian Gilroy; Jessica Winter

Jazmin Bean chronology
Worldwide Torture (2019)	Traumatic Livelihood (2024)

Singles from Worldwide Torture
- 1. "Worldwide Torture" Released: 1 August 2019; 2. "Saccharine" Released: 22 October 2019

Reissue cover

Worldwide Torture is the debut extended play (EP) by English singer Jazmin Bean, released on 22 October 2019 through Aswang Birthday Cake. Bean wrote and recorded the EP with producers Dave Draper, Dougal Drummond, Kristian Gilroy and Jessica Winter whilst working on their GCSE exams. Worldwide Torture features an experimental sound spanning multiple genres whilst drawing primarily from pop music and heavy metal, and explores lyrical themes of romance, emotions, trauma, abuse, fighting back, and regaining control. Worldwide Torture was supported by the singles "Worldwide Torture" and "Saccharine"; the attention surrounding the latter and "Hello Kitty" led to Bean signing to Interscope and Island Records, who reissued the EP with six additional tracks in November 2020.

== Background and release ==
Jazmin Bean began making music at the age of 15 after enrolling at a film school in London. They (Note: Bean is agender and uses they/them pronouns.) initially intended to make music to soundtrack their films, but ultimately decided to pursue music full-time as they did not enjoy film school. Bean wrote songs after returning home from school, considering their sound and ideas for their music videos simultaneously. Whilst working on their GCSE exams, Bean wrote and recorded Worldwide Torture with producers Dave Draper, Dougal Drummond, Kristian Gilroy and Jessica Winter at Octagon Studios in Brixton; they wrote the EP's title track during their maths exam. Bean said they recorded the EP for free after asking the producers for favours, promising ostensibly that it would be successful and that they would be repaid later.

Worldwide Torture's title track was released as its lead single on 1 August 2019, alongside a music video that Bean self-financed and directed for £500. On 22 October 2019, Bean self-released the EP through their record label Aswang Birthday Cake and released a music video for "Saccharine", which was filmed on a £2,000 budget with the help of their mother and friend Salvia. In December 2019, Bean released a music video for "Hello Kitty", which became their biggest hit to date. The attention surrounding "Saccharine" and "Hello Kitty" helped Bean garner close to one million followers on TikTok and led to them signing with Interscope and Island Records. Bean worked on new songs for Worldwide Torture to distract themselves during the COVID-19 pandemic, and reissued the EP with six additional tracks on 11 November 2020; the reissue was promoted with music videos for "Yandere" and "Princess Castle".

== Composition ==
=== Overview ===
Worldwide Torture was me saying, "I'm here, I exist, and this is what you need to know about me as an artist." [...] I wanted to be as shocking as possible, to be an 'edge lord' and to get people's attention—which I did.

— Jazmin Bean

Worldwide Torture features an experimental sound spanning multiple genres whilst drawing primarily from pop music and heavy metal; music critics additionally categorized the EP as alternative pop, electropop, hyperpop, electronic rock, and nu metal. Its songs feature guitar-driven compositions, distorted electronics, nursery rhyme rhythms, and sound effects including screams, laughter, and gunshots. Bean intended the songs to individually reflect the music genres they liked, and for the sound effects to help them stand out more and structure the EP. They drew inspiration from underground and electronic music and their parents' backgrounds in rock bands, as well as "hyper femme and hyper crazy art", film soundtracks, and the works of Jim Henson, Ari Aster and Tim Burton; they highlighted the soundtracks of the films Corpse Bride and Midsommar for their orchestral qualities.

The lyrics of Worldwide Torture explore themes of romance, emotions, trauma, abuse, fighting back, and regaining control. Chuck Campbell of the Knoxville News Sentinel described the lyrics as juxtaposing "fierce braggadocio" with "disturbingly deep insecurities", whilst Sophie Walker of The Forty-Five wrote that they "keep [Bean's] heart under lock and key, protected by a fortress of don't-fuck-with-me threats". Bean initially described themselves as representing a "character" on the EP that they hoped people could "relate and attach to that they can watch be hyper femme and crazy and theatrical and feel no shame for it." They later said the EP's character was intended to help them cope with and protect themselves from abusive situations they could not talk about at the time, and that it "was written from the perspective of what I wished that I could have done".

=== Songs ===
Jael Goldfine of Paper considering the first verse of Worldwide Torture's opening title track to be "the mission statement for Jazmin's universe". "Princess Castle", featuring Cottontail, blends alternative pop, heavy metal, and electropop; Robin Murray of Clash labelled it "trans-dimensional pop music". Bean said song is about "disregarding someone, but it's about something kind of completely different." "Saccharine" presents conflicting feelings over a crush and fears of vulnerability and intimacy over a "Jekyll and Hyde" instrumental switching between "grinding, distorted rock" and "dreamy pop", according to Goldfine. Titled after the eponymous character, "Hello Kitty" is a speed metal track about Bean being "depressed and friendless" in school and using cartoons and toys as a way to cope; they later claimed to have written it as a joke. The last track of the EP's standard edition, "Little Lamb", is an "industrial goth musical" displaying Bean's affinity for lambs and their symbolism.

Reissued editions of Worldwide Torture add six additional tracks. "Yandere" is a sequel to "Saccharine" that sees Bean accepting the feelings they had on the latter song and outlining their devotion and willingness to murder anyone who gets in the way of them over "fluttering" keyboards and heavy guitars. The bass-heavy "Monster Truck" features alternating segments displaying Bean's "sinister, baby-doll sweetness" and a "vicious, screamo freak-out" by guest vocalist Zheani. Yusuf Baala of Dazed likened "War Zone Urchin" to "a nymph in an enchanted forest, to a Britney Spears fantasy commercial, to piercing screams that sounds like fairies getting their wings ripped off." Bean wrote "B4 the Flight" during a time they were heartbroken, and struggled to complete the song for months as they kept crying every time they tried to record vocals. Walker considered Bean's cover of "I'm a Slave 4 U" by Britney Spears to be an "antidote" to the original song; Campbell likewise called the cover a "deconstructed mess" that shows Bean "[turning] cultural icons inside-out".

== Reception ==
Professional ratings
Review scores
Source	Rating
Knoxville News Sentinel	4/5

Emily Swingle of Gay Times praised Worldwide Torture for consistently being "positively carnivorous and unflinchingly bold". Günseli Yalcinkaya of Dazed remarked that it "sounds like [a] nightmarish fever dream—in the best way possible." Campbell of the Knoxville News Sentinel believed that, in spite of the "unapologetically histrionic" EP's "derivative roots", music fans "should be impressed by Jazmin Bean's commitment to the cause" and that it would "sound radical" to "those less experienced in music history". In 2021, The Forty-Five listed "Monster Truck" as the 41st best hyperpop song of all time.

By October 2023, Worldwide Torture had received over 500 million streams. Kerrang!'s George Garner said that Bean's "iconically demonic (or demonically iconic) image" and accompying "talent for splicing metal and hyperpop" on the EP helped "[mark] the arrival of a major new audio-visual artist". According to Swingle, Bean "proved how far alternative innovation could be stretched" with the EP and "[inspired] a wave of grunge-tinged artists to arise in their wake". Bean had not anticipated that the EP would be successful or that it would translate well with their makeup following on social media. Over time, Bean felt increasingly limited by the "character" and style associated with Worldwide Torture and decided to abandon it on their eighteenth birthday. Despite this, they remain proud of EP and what they accomplished through it. In 2023, Bean covered "Saccharine", "Yandere" and "Little Lamb" on their Acoustic Church Session EP.

== Track listing ==
Worldwide Torture – Standard edition track listing
No.	Title	Writer(s)	Producer(s)	Length
1.	"Worldwide Torture"	Jazmin Bean; Dave Draper	Draper	3:33
2.	"Princess Castle" (featuring Cottontail)	Bean; Dougal Drummond; Brian Zuniga	Drummond	3:33
3.	"Saccharine"	Bean; Jessica Winter	Winter	2:59
4.	"Hello Kitty"	Bean; Drummond; Kristian Gilroy	Drummond; Gilroy	2:31
5.	"Little Lamb"	Bean; Drummond; Gilroy	Drummond; Gilroy	3:13
Total length:				15:50

Worldwide Torture – Reissue track listing
No.	Title	Writer(s)	Producer(s)	Length
1.	"Worldwide Torture"	Bean; Draper	Draper	3:33
2.	"Saccharine"	Bean; Winter	Winter	2:59
3.	"Yandere"	Bean; Winter	Winter	3:31
4.	"Monster Truck" (featuring Zheani)	Bean; Winter; Zheani	Winter	3:56
5.	"Princess Castle" (featuring Cottontail)	Bean; Drummond; Zuniga	Drummond	3:32
6.	"War Zone Urchin"	Bean; Winter	Winter	4:04
7.	"B4 the Flight"	Bean; Winter	Bean; Winter	5:10
8.	"Super Slaughter"	Bean; Winter	Winter	2:45
9.	"I'm a Slave 4 U" (Britney Spears cover)	Chad Hugo; Pharrell Williams	Winter	3:23
10.	"Hello Kitty"	Bean; Drummond; Gilroy	Drummond; Gilroy	2:31
11.	"Little Lamb"	Bean; Drummond; Gilroy	Drummond; Gilroy	3:13
Total length:				38:41

== Personnel ==
Adapted from liner notes and Tidal.

Musicians
- Jazmin Bean – vocals
- Jessica Winter – drum programming (3, 9), guitar, piano (3), synthesizer (3, 7, 9), sound effects (7), keyboard (9)
- Scott Rimington – guitar (2, 3), programming (9)
- Larry Hibbitt – guitar (3, 6)
- Xander Wright – synthesizer (9)

Artwork

- Daniel Mutton - photography (original cover)
Technical
- Pete Maher – mastering
- Dave Draper – mixing (1)
- Paul David Hager – mixing (2–11)
- Alex O'Donovan – engineering (2, 4, 7, 9), vocal engineering (7), vocal production (9)
- Jessica Winter – engineering (3, 7, 9), string direction (7)
- Xander Wright – recording, assistant engineer (2, 3)
- Luke Ferrero – recording, assistant engineer (3)
- Jazmin Bean – string direction (7)

== Release history ==
Release history for Worldwide Torture
Initial release date	Label	Format	Ref.
22 October 2019	Aswang Birthday Cake	Digital download, streaming	
11 November 2020	Aswang Birthday Cake; Interscope; Island	Digital download, streaming	
10 September 2021	Aswang Birthday Cake; Interscope; Island	CD	
10 September 2021	Aswang Birthday Cake; Interscope; Island	LP	
10 September 2021	Aswang Birthday Cake; Interscope; Island	Cassette	
