= Jazmin Bean discography =

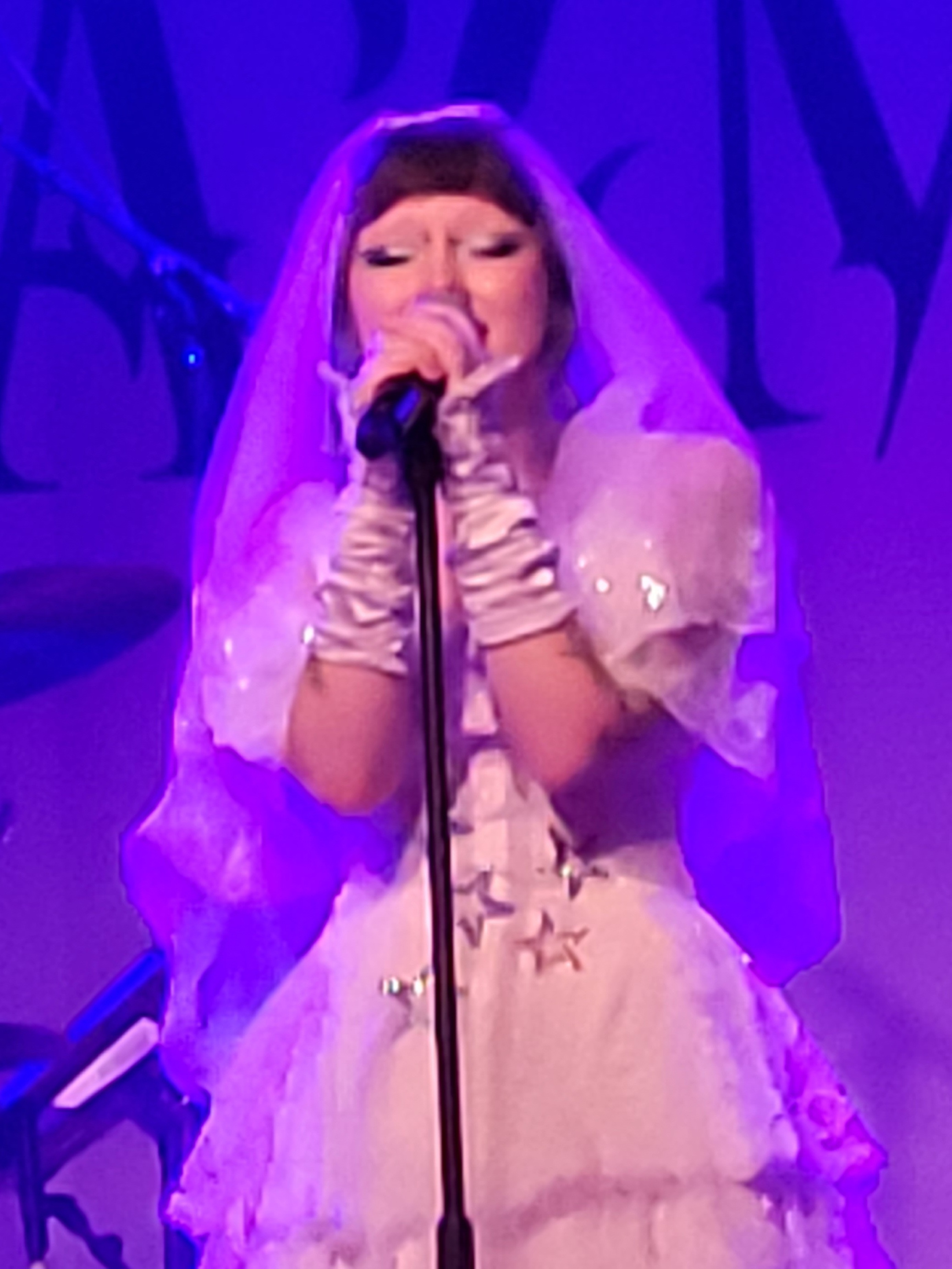
- Bean performing in Cambridge, Massachusetts in 2023
- Studio albums: 1
- EPs: 2
- Singles: 19
- Music videos: 14

The English singer Jazmin Bean has released one studio album, two extended plays, nineteen singles and fourteen music videos. Bean self-released their (Note: Bean is agender and uses they/them pronouns.) debut extended play, Worldwide Torture, in October 2019 through their own record label, Aswang Birthday Cake. After signing with Interscope and Island Records, they reissued the EP with six additional tracks in November 2020. Following the release of several studio singles, Bean released the Acoustic Church Session EP in 2023. Their debut album, Traumatic Livelihood, was released in February 2024, and peaked at number 5 on the Scottish Albums Chart.

== Studio albums ==
List of studio albums, with selected chart positions
Title	Album details	Peak chart positions	
Title	Album details	UK	SCO
Traumatic Livelihood	Released: 23 February 2024; Label: Aswang Birthday Cake, Interscope, Island; Format: CD, LP, digital download	— (Note: Although Traumatic Livelihood did not enter the UK Albums Chart, it reached number 22 on the UK Album Sales chart.)	5
"—" denotes a recording that did not chart or was not released in that territory

== Extended plays ==
List of studio extended plays with details
Title	Details
Worldwide Torture	Standard edition: Released: 22 October 2019; Label: Aswang Birthday Cake; Format: Digital download, streaming; The Re-Up: Released: 11 November 2020; Label: Aswang Birthday Cake, Interscope, Island; Format: CD, CS, LP, digital download
Acoustic Church Session	Released: 24 March 2023; Label: Aswang Birthday Cake, Interscope, Island; Format: Digital download, streaming

== Singles ==
=== As lead artist ===
List of singles as lead artist with title, year, and album
Title	Year	Album
"Worldwide Torture"	2019	Worldwide Torture
"Saccharine"	2019	Worldwide Torture
"War Zone Urchin"	2019	Worldwide Torture
"Pesticides"	2019	Non-album singles
"Birthday Bitch"	2020	Non-album singles
"Super Slaughter"	2020	Worldwide Torture
"Yandere"	2020	Worldwide Torture
"Monster Truck" (featuring Zheani)	2020	Worldwide Torture
"R U Looking 4 Me Now"	2021	Non-album singles
"Puppy Pound"	2022	Non-album singles
"Carnage" (featuring Lucy Loone)	2022	Non-album singles
"Piggie"	2023	Traumatic Livelihood
"Favourite Toy"	2023	Traumatic Livelihood
"Terrified"	2023	Traumatic Livelihood
"You Know What You've Done"	2024	Traumatic Livelihood
"It's Not My Fault (It's Yours)"	2024	Traumatic Livelihood (Extended Edition)
"Darling"	2026	TBA
"Silvering Blade"	2026	TBA

=== As featured artist ===
List of singles as featured artist, showing year released and album name
Title	Year	Album
"Hellhound" (DeathbyRomy featuring Jazmin Bean)	2023	Non-album single

== Music videos ==
List of music videos, with directors, along with albums
Title	Year	Director(s)	Album	Ref.
"Worldwide Torture"	2019	Jazmin Bean	Worldwide Torture	
"Saccharine"	2019	Jazmin Bean	Worldwide Torture	
"Hello Kitty"	2019	Jazmin Bean	Worldwide Torture	
"Birthday Bitch"	2020	Jazmin Bean	Non-album single	
"Yandere"	2020	Jazmin Bean	Worldwide Torture	
"Princess Castle"	2020	Jazmin Bean	Worldwide Torture	
"Puppy Pound"	2022	Shan Phearon and Jazmin Bean	Non-album singles	
"Carnage"	2022	Shan Phearon and Jazmin Bean	Non-album singles	
"Piggie"	2023	Jazmin Bean & Zak Watson	Traumatic Livelihood	
"Favourite Toy"	2023	Jazmin Bean & Zak Watson	Traumatic Livelihood	
"Terrified"	2023	Jazmin Bean & Zak Watson	Traumatic Livelihood	
"You Know What You've Done"	2024	Jazmin Bean & Zak Watson	Traumatic Livelihood	
"Shit Show"	2024	Jazmin Bean & Zak Watson	Traumatic Livelihood	
"Darling"	2026	Jazmin Bean	TBA	
"Silvering Blade"	2026	Jazmin Bean & Zak Watson	TBA	
