= Jazmin Bean =

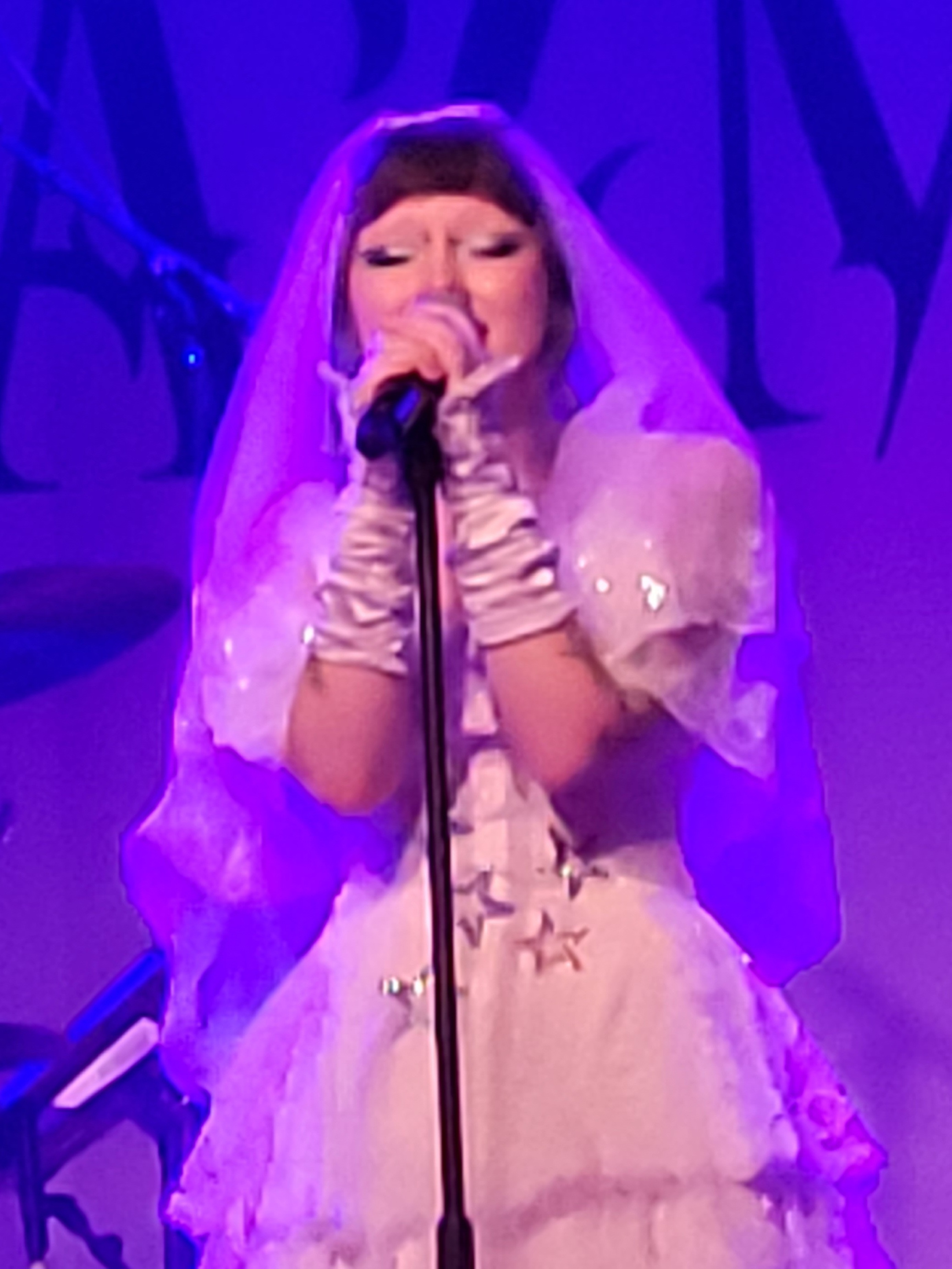
- Bean performing in Cambridge, Massachusetts in 2023
- Born: Jasmine Adams; 7 February 2003 (age 23)
- Occupations: Singer; songwriter; makeup artist
- Years active: 2017–present
- Parents: Ginger Wildheart (father); Angie Adams (mother)
- Musical career
- Origin: London, England
- Genres: Pop-metal; trap metal; grunge; alternative pop; hyperpop; acoustic pop
- Instrument: Vocals
- Works: Discography
- Labels: Aswang Birthday Cake; Interscope; Island
- Website: jazminbean.net

Jasmine Adams (born 7 February 2003), known professionally as Jazmin Bean, is an English singer, songwriter, and makeup artist. Born and raised in London, they (Note: Bean is non-binary and uses they/them pronouns.) first gained attention online for their "extreme" makeup looks. They self-released their first extended play Worldwide Torture in 2019, which was later reissued in 2020 through Interscope and Island Records. Their debut album Traumatic Livelihood was released on 23 February 2024.

== Early life ==
Jasmine Adams was born on 7 February 2003 to father Ginger Wildheart, a singer-songwriter and rock guitarist, and mother, Angie Adams, a drummer and former member of the punk rock band Fluffy. They are mostly of English ancestry through their father's side, but also have Filipino ancestry from their grandparents. They have stated that they had "minimal to no friends" and were "often isolated" during high school.

== Career ==
=== Music ===
Bean began performing music at age 15. Their first live performance involved them singing while rubbing chicken liver on themself at a bar. They released their debut single, "Worldwide Torture", in 2019. They self-released their debut extended play, Worldwide Torture, in October 2019, under their personal label Aswang Birthday Cake. It was later reissued by Island and Interscope Records in November 2020 with six additional tracks. A music video for their song "Saccharine", featuring Salvia taken from Worldwide Torture, was also released in October 2019. They've released solo singles, including "Hello Kitty" in December 2019 and "Yandere" in October 2020, and collaboration singles "Princess Castle" featuring Cottontail and "Monster Truck" featuring Zheani were both released in November 2020.

In October 2023, Bean announced their debut studio album Traumatic Livelihood, released on 23 February 2024.

=== Makeup ===
Bean became known on social media for their "extreme", "doll-like" makeup looks and pastel goth style, which they have described as "genderless monster". They first started doing makeup as an early teenager while trying to recreate the looks of their Monster High dolls. They run Cult Candy Cosmetics, a cruelty-free, vegan makeup brand.

== Artistry ==
Bean's music has been described as pop metal, trap metal, hyperpop, alt-pop, grunge, and horror pop. Paper's Jael Goldfine described their music as "freaky", "eerie", and "genre-bending". They have stated that their music is inspired by film soundtracks, including those of the 2019 horror film Midsommar and the 2005 fantasy film Corpse Bride.

Bean has stated that their style is inspired by Hello Kitty, Aswangs, Fraggle Rock, and Tim Burton films, and they have described it as a form of escapism.

Bean initially became known for a pastel-goth aesthetic combining cute imagery, frilled clothing and horror motifs. In a 2019 interview with Vogue, they discussed their style and non-binary identity. By the release of Traumatic Livelihood in 2024, Bean had moved away from the elaborate makeup associated with their early career, describing in interviews with 1883 Magazine and NME how their style had evolved alongside their music.

Bean's makeup style, formerly known for its "hybrid creature" aesthetic, has evolved from a more extreme, fantasy-inspired look to a more glam, albeit still alternative, style, while maintaining their signature use of makeup as a form of expression.“As soon as I got out of rehab, I cut all my hair off and changed my makeup style because I kept seeing people with the same look,” Bean stated, in an interview.

== Personal life ==
Bean has autism. They are nonbinary and use they/them pronouns.

In 2022, Bean spent several months in a rehabilitation clinic for a ketamine addiction. Prior to this, they had written the majority of their debut album while on the drugs, but decided to scrap it and start over after recovering "... to avoid any sense of 'woe is me'".

== Discography ==
Studio albums

- Traumatic Livelihood (2024)

== Tours ==
- The Terrified Tour (2023)
- The Traumatic Livelihood Tour (2024)
