= Man Bites Dog =

Man bites dog is an aphoristic journalism expression.

Man Bites Dog may also refer to:

- Man Bites Dog (film), a 1992 Belgian mockumentary
- Man Bites Dog (TV series), a 1999 Flemish TV series
- "Man Bites Dog", a satirical column in The Irish Times (1971–1981) by Donal Foley
- "Man Bites Dog", a song by Irving Berlin
- Man Bites Dog (album), a 2026 album by digital hardcore duo Femtanyl

== See also ==
- Dog Bites Man, a 2006 American comedy TV series
