= The Right to Write =

Book by Julia Cameron

The Right to Write: An Invitation and Initiation into the Writing Life
- Author: Julia Cameron
- Language: English
- Genre: Nonfiction
- Publisher: Penguin Putnam Inc.
- Publication date: 27 December 1999
- Publication place: United States
- Media type: Print Paperback
- Pages: 233pp
- ISBN: 1-58542-009-3

The Right to Write: An Invitation and Initiation into the Writing Life is a nonfiction book about the creative process that was written by Julia Cameron in the first person. The book includes the author's experiences of writing and also has exercises for the reader.

== Summary ==
The main focus of The Right to Write stated in the introduction is "to heal writers who are broken, initiate writers who are afraid, and entice writers who are standing at river's edge, wanting to put a toe in". The book includes an introduction and has 43 chapters, at the end of each of which is a writing exercise. At the end of the book, Cameron suggests additional texts for the reader. The author uses her own experiences, metaphors and figures of speech to describe the writing process. Cameron describes writer's block as a wall, a place where many start to compete and doubt their writing.

Cameron recommends writers perform writing exercises. These include free-writing, listing things the reader may value, observation and writing about the reader's surroundings.

In the chapter "Sketching", Cameron recommends writers sketch their surroundings, the mood they are in, and anything else around that might be of interest.

The "Artist Date" chapter describes a time a writer sets aside to engage, alone, in activities that stimulate creativity and inspire the writer. Cameron refers to the process of finding inspiration for creative projects as "restocking the well". A "dried-up well" symbolizes writer's block. "Morning Pages" is an exercise Cameron recommends to free the writer from self-censure. It is a longhand, free-writing activity done in the morning about anything the reader wants to write about.

== Reviews ==
According to Lori Herring:

Julia Cameron's new book on writing, The Right to Write, is a writer's midnight-helping of macaroni and cheese; an insightful walk through southwestern sagebrush; a friend's voice in the middle of the night calling: Don't give up ... Not since Natalie Goldberg's Writing Down the Bones has such a helpful book on writing been written. The Right to Write is manna for the struggling or just-beginning or would-have-been writer; for anyone who has ever wanted to write but didn't.

Joann Mathews writes:

So goes the belief that anyone can write because it's easy, yet in The Right to Write, Julia Cameron wants to convince the reader that's exactly the case. She may even scold the writer for discouraging the surgeon. ... Each of the 43 segments in the book begins with an invitation to write, followed by encouragement to do so. The invitation tries to debunk what Cameron calls myths about writing.

The Chicago Tribune notes; "Cameron's own writing, however, is too precious for anybody but the most rosy-eyed beginner".

== See also ==
- The Artist's Way

== Bibliography ==
- Cameron, Julia (1998). The Right to Write: An Invitation and Initiation into the Writing Life.
