= Femtanyl =

Canadian electronic music duo

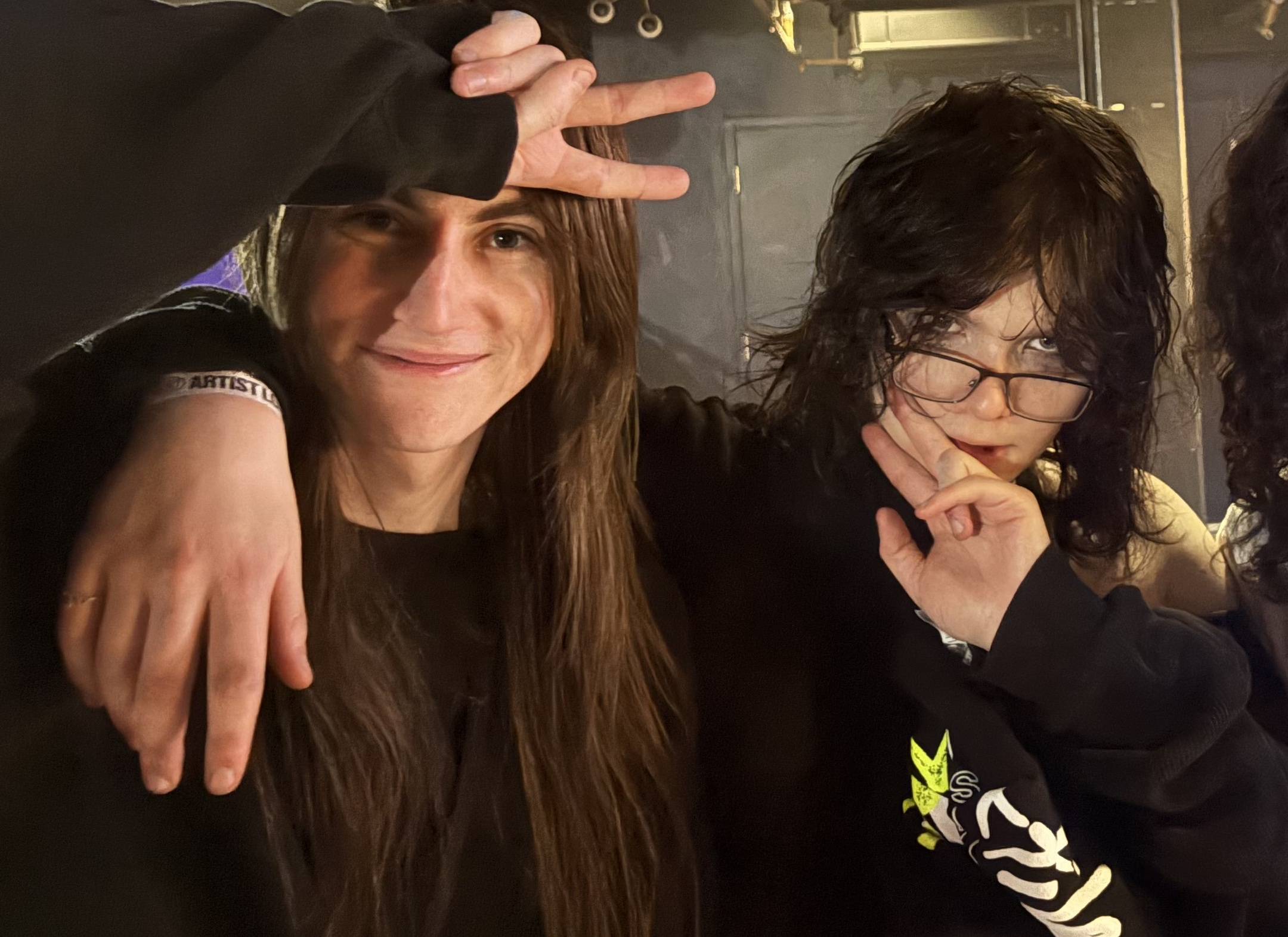
- Callender (left) and Stockwood (right) in 2026

Background information
- Origin: Toronto, Ontario, Canada
- Genres: Digital hardcore; breakcore
- Years active: 2023–present
- Label: Columbia
- Members: Noelle Stockwood; Juno Callender
- Website: femtanyl.com

Femtanyl (stylized in all lowercase) are a Canadian-American electronic music duo based in Toronto and Seattle consisting of founding member and lead singer Noelle Stockwood (formerly Mansbridge) and multi-instrumentalist Juno Callender.

Their music is popular in online spaces, especially among the furry fandom. They take inspiration from a wide variety of sources including groups like Nine Inch Nails, Throbbing Gristle, the Prodigy, and Drain Gang, as well as modern electronic dance music and pop music. Their cover art, most of which Stockwood designs herself, often depicts their white cat-like mascot, Token, appearing disfigured or injured. Both Stockwood and Callender are transgender women, however they take issue with Femtanyl being reduced to "trans music" by commentators.

== Career ==
Femtanyl began in 2023 as a solo act by Stockwood, who had previously released music under the name LilyNiku. Her debut track, "P3t," along with other early tracks, "Katamari" and "Girl Hell 1999," quickly gained popularity on YouTube through various fanmade videos. These early works gained her the visibility to sign a distribution deal with release.global, part of the Artist Partner Group. She released her debut EP, Chaser, in September of the same year. Writing for Pitchfork, Kieran Press-Reynolds described the EP as "a relentless hamster wheel of energy." It amassed over 40 million streams in its first year on streaming services. Stockwood performed her first show in January 2024, which sold out in two hours. By July 2024, she had sold out multiple shows with over 650 tickets each.

In mid-2024, Stockwood was seeking a live drummer to give her shows "a bit more juice." Her manager introduced her to Callender, who had previously toured with West Coast hardcore and screamo bands and had studied sound design. Despite Callender not being a drummer at the time, the two were immediately eager to collaborate because of their chemistry as friends and bandmates. Callender practiced all of Femtanyl's songs on drums over the course of about two months. On August 15, the duo met in Seattle for a successful first show together. Callender describes the style they have developed as a mix of "electronic music with an emphasis on physicality, aggression and kinetics" and "brightness, fun and poppy tendencies."

They released their second EP, Reactor, in November 2024. It featured American rapper Danny Brown on the track "M3 N Min3."

In August 2025, Callender became an official member of the band. She had become much more involved with the project since meeting Stockwood, and had grown to contribute as a writer, producer, and multi-instrumentalist during their time together.

In November 2025, Femtanyl was featured in Brown's album Stardust on the track "1L0v3myL1f3!" Along with Underscores, they also performed as supporting acts for Brown's Stardust Tour, which launched alongside the album.

On February 13, 2026, they released their debut album, Man Bites Dog, in which Stockwood imagines a life where she never transitioned and instead became a "terrible guy who sucks." The album received positive reviews, with Kieran Press-Reynolds of Pitchfork giving it 7.2/10 and Allie Gregory of Exclaim! writing that Man Bites Dog "expands on the pair's already inventive undertakings of breakcore, reorienting themselves within archival internet aesthetics, drawing on vaporwave and witchhouse, the Death Grips œuvre, horrorcore and outright brainrot." In June 2026, Femtanyl performed at the Primavera Sound 2026 festival in Barcelona, Spain.

In October 2026, Femtanyl signed with Columbia Records. They released "All The Time," their first single under the new label, on October 9.

== Discography ==
=== Studio albums ===
Title	Album details
Man Bites Dog	Released: February 13, 2026; Label: Self-released; Format: CD, vinyl, digital download, streaming

=== Extended plays ===
Title	Album details
Chaser	Released: August 27, 2023; Label: Self-released, Kitty on Fire (physical); Format: CD, cassette, vinyl, digital download, streaming
Reactor	Released: November 15, 2024; Label: Self-released; Format: Digital download, streaming

=== Singles ===
Title	Year	Album
"Act Right"	2023	Chaser
"P3t"	2023	Chaser
"Push Ur T3mprr"	2023	Chaser
"Murder Every 1 U Know!" (featuring Takihasdied)	2023	Chaser
"Katamari"	2023	Chaser
"Girl Hell 1999"	2023	Chaser
"S33k H3lp"	2023	Non-album singles
"xX_N3vr_Said_Goodby3_Xx"	2023	Non-album singles
"I Might B3 Sick"	2023	Non-album singles
"Speed Drive" (Charli XCX - Femtanyl remix)	2023	Non-album singles
"Dogmatica"	2023	Non-album singles
"Lovesick, Cannibal!" (featuring Takihasdied)	2023	Non-album singles
"Puppyplay!" (Mailpup featuring Femtanyl and Sixwing)	2023	Non-album singles
"Dinner"	2023	Reactor
"And I'm Gone"	2024	Reactor
"Weightless"	2024	Reactor
"M3 N Min3" (featuring Danny Brown)	2024	Reactor
"Mix. 01 – Pickmeup!" (with Cardinia Road)	2024	Non-album singles
"Worldwid3" (featuring Zombae)	2024	Non-album singles
"Mix. 02 - Bothered!"	2025	Non-album singles
"Nastywerkkkk!" (with Issbrokie)	2025	Non-album singles
"Lottery"	2025	Non-album singles
"Zero Indivisible" (Hearsethief featuring Femtanyl)	2025	Satori
"Body The Pistol"	2025	Man Bites Dog
"Head Up"	2026	Man Bites Dog
"War Girl" (astrid featuring Femtanyl)	2026	Non-album singles
"Magfest"	2026	Non-album singles
"Dual Wield" (Machine Girl - Femtanyl remix)	2026	PsychoWarrior: MG Ultra X: The Remixes [Minus One]
"All The Time"	2026	Non-album singles

=== Production credits ===
Title	Year	Artist(s)	Album	Occupation(s)
"1L0v3myL1f3!" (featuring Femtanyl)	2025	Danny Brown	Stardust	Featured artist, Producer, Composer
"Sh3 L00k3d D3dd" (featuring Femtanyl)	2025	Takihasdied	wrath complex	Featured artist, Co-producer, Vocals
"Chemsex"	2025	Takihasdied	wrath complex	Co-producer
"Pain"	2025	Takihasdied	wrath complex	Co-producer
