= Traumatic Livelihood =

Studio album by Jazmin Bean
- Released: 23 February 2024
- Recorded: 2022–2023
- Studios: Destined (London); Jonny Coffer (London); Livingston (London); Noatune (London); Royal (Los Angeles)
- Genres: Pop; alternative pop; pop rock
- Length: 46:14
- Labels: Aswang Birthday Cake; Interscope; Island
- Producers: Travis Barker; Evan Blair; Jonny Coffer; John Feldmann; J Moon; Imad Royal; Ilan Rubin; Matt Schwartz; Jessica Winter

Jazmin Bean chronology
Worldwide Torture (2019)	Traumatic Livelihood (2024)

Singles from Traumatic Livelihood
- 1. "Piggie" Released: 9 June 2023; 2. "Favourite Toy" Released: 11 August 2023; 3. "Terrified" Released: 13 October 2023; 4. "You Know What You've Done" Released: 19 January 2024

Traumatic Livelihood is the debut studio album by English singer Jazmin Bean, released on 23 February 2024 through Aswang Birthday Cake, Interscope and Island Records. After gaining attention with their debut extended play (EP) Worldwide Torture (2019), Bean signed to Interscope and Island and began working on an early version of their debut album in 2021 but decided to scrap it and start afresh after recovering from an addiction to ketamine in mid-2022. Bean worked primarily with producer Matt Schwartz, alongside Jonny Coffer, J Moon, John Feldmann, Travis Barker, Imad Royal, Ilan Rubin, Jessica Winter, and Evan Blair.

Traumatic Livelihood is a pop, alternative pop, and pop rock album that departs from the electronic and heavy metal-influenced direction of Worldwide Torture in favour of a softer, more grandiose pop sound marked by orchestral arrangements, recurring use of strings, and unexpected rhythmic and stylistic shifts. Its lyrics explore Bean's past experiences and traumas, addressing topics including sexual abuse, addiction, self-loathing, identity, and relationships, whilst encompassing themes of redemption, retribution, empowerment, and healing. Accompanying the change in musical style, Bean transitioned away from the extreme makeup style of their Worldwide Torture era towards a more glamorous, spring- and summer-influenced aesthetic.

Traumatic Livelihood received acclaim from music critics, who praised its songwriting and themes. Kerrang! and Ones to Watch listed it as one of the best albums of 2024. The album spawned four singles, "Piggie", "Favourite Toy", "Terrified", and "You Know What You've Done", and was supported by a headlining tour of North America and Europe, the Traumatic Livelihood World Tour, which took place between September and October 2024. An Extended Edition of the album, featuring four acoustic songs and the single "It's Not My Fault (It's Yours)", was released on 6 September 2024.

== Background ==
In October 2019, Jazmin Bean released their (Note: Bean is agender and uses they/them pronouns.) debut extended play, Worldwide Torture, through their own record label, Aswang Birthday Cake. The EP garnered attention for its blend of pop and heavy metal elements and accompanying visuals showcasing Bean's extreme makeup style. After the songs "Saccharine" and "Hello Kitty" gained traction, Bean signed to Interscope and Island Records, who reissued Worldwide Torture with six bonus tracks in November 2020. By 2021, Bean had begun working on an early version of their debut album, which followed an electropop and industrial sound. They continued to release music whilst working on new songs in Los Angeles. Bean's record labels did not think the album was good, though Bean persisted and felt it was misunderstood.

Work on the album was put on hold when, with the support of Interscope and Island, Bean checked themselves into a drug rehabilitation clinic in 2022 after struggling with a four-year addiction to ketamine, stemming from their traumatic experiences of being groomed by an older man between the ages of 14 and 17. Upon leaving rehab in May of that year, Bean revisited and decided to scrap the album, as they found it stylistically disorganised and did not want their songs to be self-pitying. In a March 2024 interview with Ones to Watch, Bean said that the scrapped debut album did not represent "true evolution" and felt it was "just fine for someone who is learning to do music". In an interview with Melodic Magazine in September that same year, they said the scrapped album was "definitely in the vault" but were also open to it eventually being released in the future.

== Recording and production ==
Bean began working Traumatic Livelihood in June 2022 and would go on to record more than 200 songs for the album. They considered its writing process their "first attempt at real songwriting" and credited their newfound sobriety with improving their songwriting skills. Bean worked primarily with producer Matt Schwartz, alongside Jonny Coffer, J Moon, John Feldmann, Travis Barker, Imad Royal, Ilan Rubin, Jessica Winter, and Evan Blair, and recorded material at Destined, Livingston Recording, Noatune and Coffer's home studio in London, and Royal Studio in Los Angeles. Bean went into the studio with no fixed ideas to give them more room to express their emotions in their songs, writing lyrics first before working on melodies with their collaborators; they preferred to write about events they could observe from a "bird's-eye point-of-view" than those they were actively involved in, and redid anything they considered "too extreme or free-thinking". Compared to when working on their scrapped debut album, Bean was more open to collaborating with producers, which they felt helped them to grow as a songwriter; they credited their main producer with pushing them in this respect and for making the album sound cohesive. Though finding it difficult to highlight any specific musical influences on the album, Bean cited "life and living a very new fresh version of life" as Traumatic Livelihood's biggest influence, alongside the "glamour" of theatre.

The first three songs written for Traumatic Livelihood were its title track, "Favourite Toy", and "Shit Show", which helped establish its direction; Bean cited the latter song as the first that made them feel "secure in the album process". "Piggie", another track written early on in production, was intended to act as a bridge between Worldwide Torture and the album but was not originally intended to appear on its track listing. They wrote the song three months after leaving rehab, after looking at pictures from their past and reflecting on the surrounding events. Bean wrote "Fish" during a period of writer's block and was initially dissatisfied with the song but later became more fond of it. Bean cited "Black Dress" and "Stockholm Butterfly" as the hardest songs to write for the album emotionally. The latter song, "Charm Bracelet", and the unreleased "Sock Puppet" were written after they attempted to pursue a legal case against their abuser, which was thrown out due to their evidence being deemed unviable for court. When deciding its track listing, Bean aimed to make Traumatic Livelihood "feel optimistic in some way and not just rotting in my pain". None of the songs Bean wrote prior to entering rehab made it onto the album; they attempted a "mashup" between their old and new songs at one point but ultimately decided that their old songs were not as good and no longer represented them as a person.

== Composition ==
=== Overview ===
Traumatic Livelihood is a pop, alternative pop, and pop rock album that departs from the electronic and heavy metal-influenced direction of Worldwide Torture in favour of a softer, more grandiose pop sound marked by orchestral arrangements recurring use of strings, and unexpected rhythmic and stylistic shifts. AllMusic's Marcy Donelson categorised it as "symphonic synth rock", whilst critic Tom Hull considered it to be "a shade denser and artsier than pure pop". Going into the album, Bean wanted to break away from the genre and image they had become known for and felt that moving in a pop direction was "natural" for them; they also intended to use strings over electronics to make it sound "timeless" instead of being dated by niches. Alfie Byrne of DIY described Bean as recalling the "operatic side" of Marina Diamandis with their "deliberate intonation". Kelsey Barnes of The Line of Best Fit and Rhian Daly of The Forty-Five both described the album as contrasting "light" and "dark" with its instrumentals and lyrics, whilst Kerrang!'s Luke Morton stated that "despite [its] nightmarish lyrical content [...] sonically it doesn't exist in the shadows".

The lyrics of Traumatic Livelihood explore Bean's past experiences and traumas, addressing topics including sexual abuse, addiction, self-loathing, identity and relationships, whilst encompassing themes of redemption, retribution, empowerment, and healing. Bean viewed Traumatic Livelihood as a "healing album" and hoped that through displaying the feelings of shame they held over their experiences, their fans would feel less alone. They intended album's contrasting instrumentals and lyrics to prevent it from forming a "trauma bond" with their fans, as they did not want it to be listened to exclusively in sad times: "I want people to have happy memories with this album [...] Things don't need to feel melancholy all the time." The album's title, which was coined before Bean went to rehab, was intended to represent the lack of a "healing timeline" from trauma and their mindset at the time of its conception. In an interview with Unclear, they said:

I wrote [Traumatic Livelihood] when I was 19 and I was starting to realise a lot of things about my life and things that have happened, and I needed to address them. I was going through a lot and it felt very tragic, but I still felt like there was always this hope and this livelihood and this excitement for life. [...] I felt like this album was honoring both—holding space for the sad, but we also need to hold space for the pushing and going forward. We can't just stay sad and down. We have to go forward and move.

=== Songs ===
Traumatic Livelihood's opening title track builds up from an "oscillating and roaming" guitar lead with layered vocals and strings into a slacker rock chorus with "thrashing" guitars. Bean intended it as an affirmation of their mindset after leaving rehab and alluded to their non-binary identity with the lyric "Maybe I'll never find out if I'm a boy or a girl". "Piggie" is a "synth-pop/rock hybrid" that sees Bean call out predators and paedophiles in the music industry whilst making fun of some of the men they were in toxic relationships with. "Favourite Toy" juxtaposes an upbeat instrumental featuring arpeggiated strings and synthesisers against ostensibly nonchalant lyrics detailing Bean's experiences of being "conditioned from such a young age not to understand what love is" and feelings of negative self-worth. They said the song's "driving melody" was meant to have "an overall sense of hopefulness and catharsis" against the lyrics. "Terrified" is a 1990s-inspired ballad featuring "moody" guitars and "warm" strings over which Bean details their feelings of anxiety and safety in realising they are in an honest, loving relationship after experiencing several abusive ones. Bean wrote the song as they felt there were not many songs that presented love in an appreciative light and highlighted the lyric "The stars you breathe begin to brush my hair"—a deliberate contrast to the "Favourite Toy" lyric "I don't want my stars they are yours to keep"—as signifying a restoration of faith in others. "Is This It" is about the times Bean was unable to keep up with expectations from their online image due to addiction and disappointed others. "You Know What You've Done" is a vengeful alternative pop song targeted at people Bean felt hurt by, and was conceived as a way to purge their feelings of remorse and revenge before they could forgive them. It was misinterpreted as a breakup song by listeners upon its initial release. "Shit Show" is about Bean wanting to escape "a truly unpleasant human" they were in a relationship with who lied about their age and kept trying to contact them after it had ended. Bean felt the song best represented Traumatic Livelihood's "drama". The song showcases Bean's "theatrical vocal delivery", and its chorus blends orchestral strings with "dry" drums and distorted guitar work.

"Fish" is about being stuck in a cycle of being unable to fix a problem and combines synths and strings with "gritty" live drums. Bean was inspired to write the song after a fishing game they were addicted to, which they associated with "not having a good time". "Black Dress" is a "mournful ballad" featuring "spacious" melodies, over which Bean reflects on their struggles with addiction and past friendships after gaining sobriety; in the song's first verse, they recall their experience of doing drugs at the funeral of a friend who died of an overdose. "Best Junkie You Adore" also relates to Bean's struggles with addiction and sees them describe "squalor with intricate detail while [...] [hopping] around a pretty vocal line", per Byrne. "Stockholm Butterfly" presents Bean's mixed feelings over the outcome of their legal case as they look back on a specific event from their teenage years and wish their abuser would die so they could not victimise anybody else. In "Charm Bracelet", Bean tells themselves to accept their lack of control over events and that they "just have to keep going"; they intended the song to blend trip hop with country music. "Bitch with the Gun" is marked by dynamic shifts and was originally intended as the final song on Traumatic Livelihood, as Bean felt it encompassed its themes. The final track on the album's standard version, "The Blood Brings Colour and Fluoresce", is about "find[ing] magic in the badness" and sees Bean compare life to tending a garden over strings and "splashing" drums. Bean described the Extended Edition bonus track "It's Not My Fault (It's Yours)" as "exposing myself and the kind of parts of my brain that maybe I don't want people to always see" and viewed it as departing from the main album's themes in discussing how "despite having a lot of music and media that's very self help-y, [...] I am definitely not healed." DIY's Daisy Carter felt the song showed "how recovering from trauma isn't a linear experience".

== Release and promotion ==
"Piggie" was released as the lead single from Traumatic Livelihood on 9 June 2023, followed by "Favourite Toy" on 11 August. Three days after the release of its third single, "Terrified", Bean revealed the album's title, cover, and track listing on 16 October 2023. "You Know What You've Done" was released as the album's fourth and final single on 19 January 2024. A music video for "Shit Show" was released on 5 April 2024. Aesthetically, Traumatic Livelihood saw Bean transitioned away from the extreme makeup style of their Worldwide Torture era towars a more glamorous, spring- and summer-influenced aesthetic with flowers as a recurring element. Bean intended its "world" to be more cinematic and personal and provide a further contrast with its lyrical content.

Following an exclusive listening party at the Black Rabbit Rose in Los Angeles, where Bean hung out with 25–50 of their fans, Traumatic Livelihood was released through Aswang Birthday Cake, Interscope and Island Records on 23 February 2024. Bean embarked on a short acoustic tour of the United Kingdom thereafter. After a planned deluxe edition was scrapped due to record label issues, Bean released an Extended Edition of Traumatic Livelihood on 6 September 2024. The extended edition features four acoustic songs recorded as part of the Strawberry House Sessions alongside a new song, "It's Not My Fault (It's Yours)". Bean recorded the song "on a whim" and debuted it live at Yungblud's Bludfest a week before its release as a single, on 16 August 2024. Bean then embarked on a headlining tour of North America, Europe and the United Kingdom, the Traumatic Livelihood World Tour, from 7 September to 28 October 2024. During the tour, Bean intended to emphasise performance and audience interaction whilst making some improvements to stage design. They were joined onstage by guitarist Ben Simon and drummer Connor Burnside.

== Critical reception ==
Professional ratings
Review scores
Source	Rating
DIY	4/5 stars
The Forty-Five	4/5 stars
Kerrang!	4/5
NME	4/5 stars
Tom Hull – on the Web	B+

Traumatic Livelihood received critical acclaim. Byrne of DIY called it "an accomplished and immediate pop record", whilst Ashley Nerbovig of The Stranger labelled it "a powerful mix of soaring melody and moving lyrical skill". Kyann-Sian Williams of NME considered the album to be an "honest step forward" in Bean's artistry whose arrangements she felt "amp[ed] up the emotional impact of each song." Diffus selected it as their album of the week, with writer Lena Klasen stating it "more than lives up to expectations and offers a number of surprises as a pop record – and despite the literal Traumatic Livelihood in its content, it exudes a positive underlying energy". (Note: Quotes are translated from the original text: "seinen Erwartungen mehr als gerecht wird und als Pop-Platte einiges an Überraschung bereithält – und dabei trotz buchstäblicher Traumatic Livelihood im Inhalt eine positive Grundenergie versprüht.") Morton of Kerrang! praised the album's "organic" progression amidst its "orchestrated moments of catharsis" and concluded it was "one of the most unrelenting and unflinching records of [2024]". SLUG's Alton Barnhart believed the album would make listeners "feel bold and confident" in the moment "but think after the [album's] last song fades to silence", though he found its tracks' pacing too slow and similar. Daly of The Forty-Five felt Bean was at their strongest when embracing "theatricality and drama" but faltered on "monotonous" tracks like "Fish" and "The Blood Brings Colour and Fluoresce"; she nevertheless felt the album largely "comes good on [Bean's] early promise" and "presents an unflinching, inimitable encapsulation of their story so far and twists even their darkest moments into something that can't help but shine."

Traumatic Livelihood on year-end lists
Publication	List	Rank	Ref.
Kerrang!	The 50 Best Albums of 2024	43	
Ones to Watch	The 25 Best Albums of 2024	22	

== Track listing ==
All tracks are written by Jazmin Bean and Matt Schwartz, except where noted.

Traumatic Livelihood track listing
No.	Title	Writer(s)	Producer(s)	Length
1.	"Traumatic Livelihood"	Jazmin Bean; Dougal Drummond	Matt Schwartz	3:40
2.	"Piggie"	Bean; John Feldmann	Feldmann; Travis Barker	2:58
3.	"Favourite Toy"		Schwartz	3:02
4.	"Terrified"		Schwartz	3:06
5.	"Is This It"		Schwartz	3:04
6.	"You Know What You've Done"		Schwartz	3:12
7.	"Shit Show"		Schwartz	3:26
8.	"Fish"	Bean; Jessica Winter	Winter	3:17
9.	"Black Dress"	Bean; Imad Royal; Ilan Rubin	Royal; Rubin	3:19
10.	"Best Junkie You Adore"	Bean; Evan Blair	Blair	2:56
11.	"Stockholm Butterfly"		Schwartz	3:14
12.	"Charm Bracelet"		Schwartz	3:32
13.	"Bitch with the Gun"	Bean; Jonny Coffer	Coffer; J Moon	2:55
14.	"The Blood Brings Colour and Fluoresce"	Bean; Dante Traynor; Gamaliel Traynor	Schwartz; D. Traynor^{[a]}; G. Traynor^{[a]}	4:32
Total length:				46:14

Extended Edition bonus tracks
No.	Title	Writer(s)	Producer(s)	Length
15.	"Best Junkie You Adore" (Strawberry House Sessions)	Bean; Blair	D. Traynor; G. Traynor	3:18
16.	"A House Is Not a Home" (Strawberry House Sessions) (Dionne Warwick cover)	Burt Bacharach; Hal David	D. Traynor; G. Traynor	3:24
17.	"Stockholm Butterfly" (Strawberry House Sessions)		D. Traynor; G. Traynor	3:25
18.	"Favourite Toy" (Strawberry House Sessions)		D. Traynor; G. Traynor	3:01
19.	"It's Not My Fault (It's Yours)"	Bean; Winter	Winter	3:01
Total length:				62:23

Notes

- ^{^[a]} signifies an additional producer
- "It's Not My Fault (It's Yours)" is stylized in sentence case.

== Personnel ==
Credits adapted from liner notes and Tidal.

Musicians

- Jazmin Bean – vocals
- Matt Schwartz – bass, guitar, keyboards, programming (1, 3–7, 11, 12, 14)
- Avi Avidani – drums (1, 4, 5, 11, 14)
- Adam Betts – drums (3, 4, 7, 8)
- Marcus Locock – drum programming (3)
- Jessica Winter – background vocals, drum programming, piano, synthesizer, synthesizer programming (8, 19), harp, strings, bass, drums, sound effects (19)
- Scott Rimington – bass, guitar (8)
- Ilan Rubin – programming (9)
- Imad Royal – programming (9)
- Evan Blair – programming (10)
- Joel LeBlanc – keyboards (11)
- Jonny Coffer – bass, keyboards, guitar (13)
- J Moon – guitar (13)
- Corrina Boylan – cello (15–18)
- Aga Ujma – harp (15–18)
- Dante Traynor – lute (15–18)
- Oliver Marson – guitar (19)
- Peter Ferguson – programming, sound effects (19)

Technical

- Matt Colton – mastering (1–14)
- Jasper Ward – mastering (15–18)
- Paul David Hager – mixing (1, 3–11, 13, 14)
- Dan Lancaster – mixing (2)
- Matt Schwartz – mixing (12); engineering, string arrangement (1, 3–6, 11, 12, 14)
- Dante Traynor – mixing (15–18)
- William Lowes – mixing (19)
- Jessica Winter – engineering (8, 19)
- Lucas August – engineering (8)
- Ilan Rubin – engineering (9)
- Imad Royal – engineering (9)
- Spencer Martin – engineering (15–18)
- Peter Ferguson – engineering (19)
- Gamaliel Traynor – string arrangement (8), engineering, vocal arrangement (15–18)

== Charts ==
Chart (2024)	Peak position
Scottish Albums (OCC)	5
UK Albums Sales (OCC)	22
UK Physical Albums (OCC)	20
UK Vinyl Albums (OCC)	24

== Bibliography ==
- Brzezicka, Alex (2024). "Jazmin Bean". Still Listening. No. 8. pp. 18, 21, 26, 28.
- Kenna, Abby (interviewer) (5 March 2024). Jazmin Bean Uses Deezer (Video). Ones to Watch – via YouTube.
- Liberty, Cami (December 2024). "Jazmin Bean". Unclear. No. 103. pp. 37–38, 41–42. Archived from the original on 8 July 2025 – via Publitas.
