= Copycats (song) =

2025 single by Danny Brown and Underscores

Single by Danny Brown featuring Underscores

from the album Stardust
- Released: October 16, 2025
- Genre: Deconstructed club; electropop
- Length: 2:51
- Label: Warp
- Songwriters: Daniel Sewell; April Harper Grey
- Producer: Underscores

Danny Brown singles chronology
"OK OK" (2025)	"Copycats" (2025)	"Peace of Mind" (2026)

"Copycats" is a song by American rapper Danny Brown featuring American musician Underscores from the former's sixth studio album, Stardust (2025). It was released as the album's second single on October 16, 2025.

== Composition ==
"Copycats", a deconstructed club and electropop track, reflects Charli XCX's hyperpop 2024 album Brat mixed with techno-inspired Detroit bass, as produced and featured by Underscores. With a "squelchy bass, glitchcore blips and boops, and chiptune synths", it's a "club-ready earworm". Brown plays as a braggadocious villain aiming at imitators: "Get what you want, not what you ask for... choose my path to walk, the straight narrow", while Underscores repeats the catchy hook "rap star, pop star, rock star / Gimme that"

== Release ==
On October 16, 2025, "Copycats" was released as the second single from Stardust. Its music video released twelve days later, featuring the duo in an entourage taking selfies and living a flashy lifestyle.

== Personnel ==
Credits adapted from Tidal.

- Danny Brown – vocals
- April Harper Grey – vocals, production
- Geoff Swan – mixing
- Lewis Chapman – immersive mixing
- Tatsuya Seto – mastering
