= Julia Cameron =

US author (born 1948)

Julia B. Cameron
- Born: March 4, 1948 (age 78); Libertyville, Illinois, U.S.
- Education: Georgetown University; Fordham University
- Occupations: Teacher; author; filmmaker; playwright; journalist
- Known for: The Artist's Way
- Spouses: Martin Scorsese (m. 1976; div. 1977) Mark Bryan (div. 1993)
- Children: Domenica Cameron-Scorsese
- Website: juliacameronlive.com

Julia B. Cameron (born in U.S. March 4, 1948) is a teacher, author, artist, poet, playwright, novelist, filmmaker, composer, and journalist. She is best known for her book The Artist's Way (1992). She also has written many other non-fiction works, short stories, and essays, as well as novels, plays, musicals, and screenplays.

== Biography ==
Julia Cameron was born in Libertyville, Illinois, a suburb of Chicago, and raised Catholic. She was the second oldest of seven children. She started college at Georgetown University before transferring to Fordham University. She wrote for The Washington Post and then Rolling Stone.

She met Martin Scorsese while on assignment for Oui Magazine. They married in 1976 and divorced a year later in 1977. They have one daughter, Domenica Cameron-Scorsese, born in 1976. The marriage ended after Scorsese began seeing Liza Minnelli while the three of them were working on New York, New York. Cameron and Scorsese collaborated on three films. Her memoir Floor Sample details her descent into alcoholism and drug addiction, which induced blackouts, paranoia and psychosis. In 1978, reaching a point in her life when writing and drinking could no longer coexist, Cameron stopped abusing drugs and alcohol, and began teaching creative unblocking, eventually publishing the book based on her work: The Artist's Way. At first she sold Xeroxed copies of the book in a local bookstore before it was published by TarcherPerigee in 1992. She contends that creativity is an authentic spiritual path.

Cameron has taught filmmaking, creative unblocking, and writing. She has taught at The Smithsonian, Esalen, the Omega Institute for Holistic Studies, and the New York Open Center. At Northwestern University, she was writer in residence for film. In 2008 she taught a class at the New York Open Center, The Right to Write, named and modeled after one of her bestselling books, which reveals the importance of writing.

Cameron has lived in Los Angeles, Chicago, New York City, and Washington, D.C. She lives in Santa Fe, New Mexico.

== Works ==
=== Nonfiction ===
- The Artist's Way Toolkit, How to Use the Creative Practices. New York, NY: St. Martin's Essentials. 2024. ISBN 978-1250344977.
- Living the Artist's Way: An Intuitive Path to Greater Creativity (St. Martin's Press, 2024) ISBN 978-1-250-89758-9
- Write for Life: A Toolkit for Writers (Profile Books, 2023) ISBN 978-1-250-86628-8
- Seeking Wisdom: A Spiritual Path to Creative Connection (A Six-Week Artist's Way Program) (St. Martin's Press, 2021) ISBN 978-1-782-83861-6
- The Listening Path: The Creative Art of Attention (St. Martin's Press, 2021) ISBN 978-1-250-76858-2
- It's Never Too Late to Begin Again: Discovering Creativity and Meaning at Midlife and Beyond (Tarcher, 2016) ISBN 978-0-399-17421-6
- The Artist's Way for Parents: Raising Creative Children (Tarcher/Hay House, 2013) ISBN 978-0-399-16372-2
- The Prosperous Heart: Creating a Life of "Enough" (Tarcher/Hay House, 2011) ISBN 978-1-58542-897-7
- Faith and Will: Weathering the Storms in Our Spiritual Lives (Tarcher, 2010) ISBN 1585428019
- The Artist's Way Every Day: A Year of Creative Living (Tarcher, 2009) ISBN 978-1-585-42747-5
- Prayers to the Great Creator: Prayers and Declarations for a Meaningful Life (Tarcher, 2008) ISBN 978-1-585-42682-9
- The Writing Diet: Write Yourself Right-Size (Tarcher, 2007) ISBN 1-58542-571-0
- Finding Water: The Art of Perseverance (Tarcher, 2006) ISBN 1585424633
- How to Avoid Making Art (2006), illustrated by Elizabeth Cameron ISBN 1-58542-438-2
- Letters to a Young Artist (Tarcher, 2005) ISBN 978-1-409-03403-2
- The Sound of Paper (Tarcher, 2004) ISBN 1-58542-288-6
- Supplies: A Troubleshooting Guide for Creative Difficulties (Tarcher, 2003; Revised & Updated edition) ISBN 1-58542-212-6
- Walking in this World (Tarcher, 2003; Reprint edition ISBN 1-58542-261-4
- The Artist's Way, 10th Annv edition (Tarcher, 2002) ISBN 1-58542-146-4
- Inspirations: Meditations from The Artist's Way (Tarcher, 2001) ISBN 1-58542-102-2
- God is Dog Spelled Backwards (Tarcher, 2000) ISBN 1-58542-062-X
- God is No Laughing Matter (Tarcher, 2000) ISBN 1-58542-065-4
- Supplies: A Pilot's Manual for Creative Flight (2000) illustrations by Elizabeth Cameron ISBN 978-1-585-42066-7
- The Artist's Date Book (Tarcher, 1999), illustrated by Elizabeth Cameron Evans ISBN 0-87477-653-8
- Money Drunk Money Sober (Ballantine Wellspring, 1999) ISBN 0-345-43265-7
- The Writing Life (Sounds True, 1999) ISBN 1-56455-725-1
- Transitions (Tarcher, 1999) ISBN 0-87477-995-2
- The Artist's Way at Work (Pan, 1998) ISBN 0-330-37319-6
- Blessings (Tarcher, 1998) ISBN 0-87477-906-5
- The Right to Write: An Invitation and Initiation into the Writing Life (Tarcher, 1998) ISBN 1-58542-009-3
- Heart Steps (Tarcher, 1997) ISBN 0-87477-899-9
- The Vein of Gold: A Journey to Your Creative Heart. 1997. ISBN 0-87477-836-0.
- The Artist's Way Morning Pages Journal. Tarcher. 1995. ISBN 0-87477-886-7.
- The Money Drunk: 90 Days to Financial Sobriety. Authored with Mark A. Bryan. Los Angeles; Chicago: Lowell House; Contemporary Books. 1992. ISBN 0-929923-74-X.
- The Artist's Way: A Spiritual Path to Higher Creativity. Los Angeles, CA: Jeremy P. Tarcher/Perigee. 1992. ISBN 0-87477-694-5.

==== Memoir ====
- Floor Sample (Tarcher, 2006) ISBN 1-58542-494-3
- The Creative Life: True Tales of Inspiration (Tarcher, 2010) ISBN 978-1-585-42824-3

=== Fiction ===
- Popcorn: Hollywood Stories (Really Great Books, 2000) ISBN 1-893329-12-7
- The Dark Room (Carroll & Graf Pub,1998) ISBN 0-7867-0564-7

=== Musicals ===
- Avalon
- Magellan
- The Medium at Large

=== Plays ===
- Four Roses
- Public Lives
- The Animal in the Trees

=== Poetry collections ===
- This Earth (Sounds True, 1997; ISBN 1-56455-549-6)
- Prayers for the little ones (Renaissance Books, 1999; ISBN 1-58063-048-0)
- Prayers to the nature spirits (Renaissance Books, 1999; ISBN 1-58063-047-2)
- The Quiet Animal

=== Film/TV ===
- Miami Vice TV (1 episode)
- God's Will (independent movie)
