= Man Bites Dog (album) =

Studio album by Femtanyl
- Released: February 13, 2026
- Recorded: October 2025 – February 2026
- Genres: Digital hardcore; breakcore
- Length: 32:00
- Label: Self-released

Femtanyl chronology
Reactor (2024)	Man Bites Dog (2026)

Singles from Man Bites Dog
- 1. "Body the Pistol" Released: December 5, 2025; 2. "Head Up" Released: January 30, 2026

Man Bites Dog (stylised in all caps) is the debut studio album by the Canadian digital hardcore band Femtanyl, composed of Noelle Stockwood and Juno Callender. It was self-released by the band on February 13, 2026, via streaming services and physical media. All songs were written, produced and performed by Stockwood and Callender.

The album was teased throughout 2024 and was officially announced on December 7, 2025, via social media. The album was supported by a tour throughout the United States running from March 25, 2026, to April 5, 2026.

== Background and release ==
Man Bites Dog was initially conceived as a long-distance collaboration with Stockwood in Seattle and Callendar—who had then only just become part of the femtanyl project, which was originally Stockwood solo—in Toronto. They characterised this as an interesting time where their sleep cycles rarely overlapped, so each would progress tracks as the other slept. As the album progressed Stockwood also moved to Toronto so the duo could work on it together in person.

Following their tour with artists Danny Brown and Underscores, a teaser photo was uploaded to the band's Instagram page with the caption, "soon", on November 22, 2025. The single, "Body the Pistol", was released on December 5, 2025. The album was officially announced on December 7, 2025, on social media platforms and was listed on streaming platforms, alongside a tour to support the album from March to April 2026. On January 30, 2026, the single, "Head Up" was released digitally and physical formats of the album were listed on the bands merchandise store. The album was released on February 13, 2026.

== Theme ==
The album art for Man Bites Dog refers to it as "an album about a man I know." In a profile of the band in NME, Stockwood is quoted as saying the album is about an imagined version of herself who never transitioned, instead becoming a "terrible guy who sucks... People are viewing it through the lens of how these lyrics correlate to being trans, when in fact, it's the opposite." But the duo also describe its sound as embodying a messy kind of freedom from expectation: Stockwood saying "It’s a desperate flail," and Callender that "It’s a chaotic person who has never danced before in their life put in a situation where they have to dance."

== Critical reception ==
Man Bites Dog was not widely reviewed in the mainstream press but its few reviews were generally favorable. Allie Gregory in Exclaim!, contrastingly, gave an overwhelmingly positive review, praising the relentless energy levels and the expansion from breakcore into wider influences. Kieran Press-Reynolds for Pitchfork rated it 7.2 out of 10, citing a "rush of peaks" but saying "the textures also start to get too uniformly shadowy, the beats too stiff" Victoria Borlando in Northern Transmissions praised its energy but ultimately characterised it as "exhuasting" and some parts as "tiresome". Individual tracks were singled out as working alone - notably, James Factora of Them magazine described "Body the Pistol" as "face-melting track, one that seems engineered for a room of trans people to scream along to the chorus while pummeling each other in a mosh pit".

== Track listing ==
All tracks are written by Noelle Stockwood and Juno Callender.

No.	Title	Length
1.	"Body the Pistol"	2:38
2.	"Video Nasty"	3:02
3.	"Sick of It"	3:10
4.	"Helltarget"	3:41
5.	"City"	2:52
6.	"Head Up"	3:25
7.	"My Head Hurts"	2:46
8.	"Shows You the Way to the Hiway"	2:42
9.	"Man Bites Dog"	3:48
10.	"Is This It"	3:57
Total length:		32:01
