= Salvia (artist) =

Welsh artist

Lilith Morris
- Born: August 18, 2000 (age 26); Cyffylliog, Denbighshire, Wales
- Website: https://www.instagram.com/misslilithmorris

Lilith Salvia Morris (born August 18, 2000, also known formerly / mononymously as Salvia) is a Welsh drag artist, musician, performance artist, designer, and FX artist. Based in Cyffylliog, Denbighshire, She first garnered attention from fashion names such as Rick Owens and Vogue for her outlandish and alien like looks and Instagram posts. She collaborated with Rick Owens for his autumn/winter 2019 collection runway, working on prosthetics and makeup for the models.

She often is associated with other artists such as Jazmin Bean, creating performance art videos and art installations, however her main platform is Instagram, which she uses to showcase her work and drag looks, whilst also promoting her artistry as a musician.

== Early life ==
Growing up in a small village in North Wales, and also, living in Milan, Italy at a young age, Lilith accounts being bullied at a young age, and finding solace and inspiration from artists such as Leigh Bowery, Lady Gaga, and fashion designer Alexander McQueen. Around the age of 13, she began creating drawings and paintings inspired by sci fi and futuristic visuals, eventually moving on to using those visuals in her makeup and drag looks.

== Artistry ==
Lilith’s work covers numerous mediums, such as photography, design, directing, graphic design, FX work, makeup artistry, styling, and film making. Photographer Rick Castro described her as "an influencer, a fashion icon, a beauty icon, a goth diva." In an interview with Document Journal, Lilith told Castro, "I know there’s people who masturbate to my pictures and it makes me laugh. For some reason, people are convinced I’m in congruence with the Illuminati and Satanism. I have no idea why, or what they even mean.."

Her focus is creating edited photography of her fashion and makeup design, and she often struggles with her work being censored on online platforms due to her extremity. Her main outcome with her work is to present alien and horror influenced visuals, through muted colour palettes, medical prosthetics, and often uncomfortable displays of humanity and biology. Lilith released a single in 2020 as Salvia named "The Man who watches me sleep", an ambient pop, darkcore song, which she has stated is inspired by her childhood. She uses sounds incorporated with horror in the song, using "frightful" sound to evoke fear in the listener. The song was later released on her debut studio album 001011, on June 22, 2023. a deconstructed club, ambient pop, and industrial hip hop record that discusses the topics of gender identity, posthumanism, and her overall avant-garde drag makeup style. Her sophomore album Tulip, released February 14, 2025, is an ambient pop, indie folk and deconstructed club record, discusses the topics of Lilith’s experiences with men as a transgender woman.

=== Nullo ===
Collaborating with artist Parma Ham, Lilith created Nullo, an inaugural runway show featuring fetishwear, fashion design, and performance art. The show was created to "Redesign fetishwear and bodily augmentation for today’s posthuman tribes". Their aim with Nullo is to critique binaries, explore sexuality, and find new ways of experiencing the limits of the body. However, Lilith now no longer wishes to associate with Parma Ham.

=== Rick Owens Autumn/Winter 2019 ===
For the runway show of his Autumn/Winter 2019 show, fashion designer Rick Owens enlisted Lilith's help to transfer her otherworldly visuals to the models in the show, creating makeup inspired by and assisted by her, Lilith stating "Rick felt like my aesthetic would be very appropriate for his show; it was exciting to see my makeup brought to life on multiple models" The following year, Owens was criticized on social media by Lilith, for "borrowing heavily from the aesthetic of the teen" in his Spring/Summer 2020 show, in which Lilith was "not consulted or paid for her likeness in the show".

== Personal life ==
Lilith is a trans woman, and has stated "negative and immature reactions" to her work "are just one of the many signs of the ignorance and trans-misogyny that is still vastly present in society".

== Discography ==
=== Studio albums ===
| Title | Songs | Album details |
|---|---|---|
| 001011 | "001011"; "Stargirl"; "The Game"; "Lunchbox"; "Kiss"; "Posthuman"; "In My Pond"; "Money"; "Outpatient"; "Summer"; "Tera Toma"; "Angel's Egg"; "The Man Who Watches Me Sleep" | Released: June 22, 2023; Label: "tired and scared"; Formats: digital download, streaming |
| Tulip | "The Fields Are Frozen"; "Green Lanes"; "Perfect Day"; "Golden Coin"; "Window"; "Fig Tree"; "Hell"; "Viper"; "Pony"; "Don't Be Long"; "Tulip"; "Apple Pie" | Released: February 14, 2025; Label: "tired and scared"; Formats: digital download, streaming |
