= My First Album (Jessica Winter album) =

Studio album by Jessica Winter
- Released: 11 July 2025
- Genres: Alternative pop; synth-pop
- Length: 44:19
- Label: Lucky Number
- Producers: Bo En; Ferguson; Krinks; Raziel; Tim Randolph; Stefan Storm; Dante Traynor; Gamaliel Traynor; Jessica Winter

Jessica Winter chronology
Limerance (2023)	My First Album (2025)

Singles from My First Album
- 1. "L.O.V.E." Released: 18 February 2025; 2. "All I Ever Really Wanted" Released: 8 April 2025; 3. "Wannabe" Released: 13 May 2025; 4. "Aftersun" Released: 11 June 2025; 5. "Big Star" Released: 8 July 2025

My First Album is the debut studio album by English songwriter and musician Jessica Winter. It was released on 11 July 2025 via Lucky Number in LP, CD and digital formats.

== Background ==
The album, noted as "very poppy" and incorporating elements of indie rock, disco and industrial music, was produced by Winter with alongside several producers including Clarence Clarity and Gamaliel Traynor. It was preceded by Winter's 2023 EP, Limerence, for which she received recognition as a Top 100 emerging artist from NME.

The lead single of the album, "L.O.V.E.", was released on 18 February 2025. On 8 April 2025, she announced the album's tracklist and release date alongside its second single, "All I Ever Really Wanted". On 13 May 2025, she released "Wannabe", the album's third single. The album's fourth single, "Aftersun", was released on 11 June 2025. She released the album's final single, "Big Star", on 8 July 2025.

== Critical reception ==
Professional ratings
Aggregate scores
Source	Rating
Metacritic	81/100
Review scores
Source	Rating
AllMusic	3.5/5 stars
Clash	8/10
God Is in the TV	8/10
MusicOMH	3/5 stars
NME	4/5 stars

According to the review aggregator Metacritic, My First Album received "universal acclaim" based on a weighted average score of 81 out of 100 from 5 critic scores.

The album received a three-star rating from MusicOMH, whose reviewer John Murphy described it as "a fine debut album which hints at signs of greatness to come." AllMusic gave it a three-point-five rating and noted, "It should come as no surprise, then, that the self-produced My First Album doesn't sound like the work of a newbie, although it does find Winter making a statement about coming into her own."

Clash assigned it a rating of eight out of ten, describing it as "bold, fascinating, and addictive. A dark pleasure for summer season." NME referred to the album as "an impassioned and idiosyncratic patchwork, one which paints a portrait of anxious and wistful personhood that is, on the contrary, definitive and assured," giving it a four-star rating.

== Track listing ==
No.	Title	Lyrics	Music	Producer(s)	Length
1.	"Nirvana"	Jessica Winter; Scott Rimington	Winter; Debi Priya; Rimington	Winter; Krinks^{[c]}; Tim Randolph^{[c]}	4:04
2.	"L.O.V.E."	Winter; Peter Ferguson	Winter; Ferguson	Winter; Ferguson; Krinks^{[c]}	3:56
3.	"Feels Good (For Tonight)"	Winter	Winter; Ferguson; Stefan Storm; Charles Wallert	Winter; Storm; Krinks^{[c]}	3:07
4.	"Aftersun"	Winter	Winter; Krinks	Winter; Krinks	3:00
5.	"Big Star"	Winter; Ferguson	Winter; Ferguson	Winter; Ferguson; Krinks^{[c]}	3:34
6.	"Worst Person in the World"	Winter	Winter; Fred Macpherson	Winter; Krinks; Raziel^{[c]}	3:02
7.	"I See the Robin"	Winter	Winter; Randolph	Winter; Randolph	3:33
8.	"All I Ever Really Wanted"	Winter; Ferguson	Winter; Ferguson; Dante Traynor; Gamaliel Traynor	Winter; D. Traynor; G. Traynor; Clarence Clarity^{[c]}	3:08
9.	"Wannabe"	Winter	Winter; Scott Rimington	Winter; Krinks^{[c]}	2:59
10.	"Just Like That"	Winter	Winter; Ferguson	Winter; Ferguson; Krinks^{[c]}	3:23
11.	"Got Something Good"	Winter; Ferguson	Winter; Ferguson	Winter; Ferguson; Krinks^{[c]}; Clarence Clarity^{[c]}	3:28
12.	"Only Lonely"	Winter; Ferguson	Winter; Ferguson	Winter; Krinks^{[c]}; Randolph^{[c]}	3:50
13.	"To Know Her"	Winter; Bo En	Winter; Bo En	Winter; Bo En	3:15
Total length:					44:19

=== Note ===
- ^{^[c]} signifies a co-producer

== Personnel ==
Credits adapted from Tidal.

=== Musicians ===
- Jessica Winter – vocals (all tracks), background vocals (tracks 1–8, 10–13), bells (1), piano (2–4, 6, 10), synthesizer (2, 4, 6, 12), guitar (2, 7, 9, 12), bass guitar (4), arrangement (7, 11), drums (11)
- Peter Ferguson – guitar (1), piano (2, 3, 5), background vocals (2, 5, 8, 11, 12), arrangement (2, 5, 10, 11), synthesizer (2, 5), programming (2, 10, 11), bass guitar (5), flute (5)
- Krinks – synthesizer (1, 4, 6, 9, 10, 12), programming (4, 9)
- C. G. Whitear – guitar (1, 5, 9, 12)
- Scott Rimington – guitar (1, 5, 9)
- Eleanor Wallace – saxophone (1, 5, 11)
- Stefan Storm – programming, synthesizer (3)
- Martin Tronsson – bass guitar (3)
- Christina Lopez – percussion (4), drums (5)
- Morgan Noise – clarinet (5)
- Raziel – bass guitar, drums (6)
- Tim Randolph – bass guitar, drums (7, 9, 12); percussion (9), guitar (12)
- Clarence Clarity – drums, guitar (8); synthesizer (11)
- Dante Traynor – bass guitar, guitar, synthesizer (8)
- Gamaliel Traynor – programming, synthesizer (8)
- Larry Hibbitt – bass guitar, guitar (11)
- David Evans – synthesizer (12)
- Calum Bowen – arrangement, bass guitar, guitar, piano, programming (13)

=== Technical ===
- Caesar Edmunds – mixing (1, 2, 4, 8–12)
- Barny Barnicott – mixing (3, 5–7, 13)
- Matt Colton – mastering
- Krinks – engineering (1–6, 9–12)
- Jessica Winter – engineering (1, 2, 9)
- C. G. Whitear – engineering (1, 5)
- Calum Sanderson – engineering (1, 5)
- Larry Hibbitt – engineering (2, 5, 9, 11)
- Peter Ferguson – engineering (2, 5)
- Stefan Storm – engineering (3)
- Lucas August – engineering (5)
- Ben Matravers – engineering (6, 10)
- Raziel – engineering (6)
- Tim Randolph – engineering (7, 12)
- Dante Traynor – engineering (8)
- Gamaliel Traynor – engineering (8)

=== Visuals ===
- Nan Moore – art direction, cover photo
- Luke Nugent – photo editing

== Charts ==
Chart performance for My First Album
Chart (2025)	Peak position
UK Independent Albums (Official Charts)	17
