= The Artist's Way =

1992 self-help book for creativity by Julia Cameron

The Artist's Way: A Spiritual Path to Higher Creativity
- Author: Julia Cameron
- Language: English
- Subject: Self-help, creativity
- Publisher: Jeremy P. Tarcher
- Publication date: 1992
- Publication place: United States of America
- ISBN: 0874776945

The Artist's Way: A Spiritual Path to Higher Creativity is a 1992 self-help book by American author Julia Cameron. The book was written to help people with creative recovery, which teaches techniques and exercises to assist people in gaining self-confidence in harnessing their creative talents. Cameron also discusses the connection between creativity, faith, and one's spiritual connection with God.

The book outlines a 12-week program with weekly readings, creative exercises, and daily assignments including "morning pages" of free writing. Each week builds upon the last and encourages readers to build creative habits. It encourages readers to follow the program in a group, and many groups spawned internationally to facilitate the course, including seminars and workshops hosted by Cameron herself.

== History ==
After being turned down by the William Morris literary agency, Cameron self-published the book under the title Healing the Artist Within. Cameron typed up the book herself and sold Xeroxed copies in a local bookstore. The first printing was about 9,000 copies. In 1992 the book was published by Jeremy Tarcher (now part of Penguin Group) under revised title The Artist's Way, and millions of copies have since been sold.

== Spirituality ==
Cameron described the relationship between creativity and faith in a 2003 interview: "Any time we're engaged in a creative act we're engaged with an inherently spiritual act. Faith is almost the bottom line of creativity... You have to muster a certain amount of belief that you're not making a mistake and you're not a fool. And this means you have to have faith."

Cameron describes creative dreams and inspiration as being of divine origin and influence, not from ego, and that fulfilment of these dreams allows for spiritual growth. Not pursuing one's creative dreams is thus "shutting [oneself] off from a profound source of divine energy."

In a 2011 interview, she stated that "the essential principle [of The Artist's Way] is that creativity is part of the natural order of life. Life is energy, you see - pure creative energy... Creativity is God's gift to us, and the only way we can repay this gift, really, is to use it."
