= Zheani =

Australian musician (born 1993)

- Born: Zheani Isobel Sparkes; 26 April 1993 (age 33); Bundaberg, Queensland, Australia
- Children: 1

Zheani Isobel Sparkes (/ˌziˈɑː.ni/; b. 1993) is an Australian musician. After modelling as part of the Cara Delevingne–fronted DKNY campaign in 2014 and installing an art exhibition in Melbourne, she turned her attention to music and released six EPs between 2018 and 2023. She makes autobiographical music across a wide range of genres. One track, "Bring Wet Cunt", attracted attention after it was played uncensored on triple j and triple j Unearthed.

== Biography ==
Sparkes was born in Bundaberg Base Hospital and grew up in Wallaville. Her unusual name (which she has had since birth) is a product of her father's interest in numerology and tarot. Following her father's death, Zheani moved to Seventeen Seventy, Queensland to live with her mother. She attended Rosedale State School and briefly studied film at university, but decided to drop out less than a year in to pursue other endeavors. Her childhood was marked by domestic violence and drug use, as she illustrates in her works and hints at in interviews. In June 2013, she was contacted by Yolandi Visser of Die Antwoord and then repeatedly by the band's Watkin Tudor Jones; she went to Cape Town with him and subsequently joined the band as an assistant for part of their 2015 Australia tour.

Sparkes modelled as part of an October 2014 Cara Delevingne collection for DKNY; by the following September, she had lived in several countries and was living in London. In May 2017, Sparkes and her creative partner Mik Shida created a street art exhibition by stripping naked, covering themselves with blue paint, and leaving imprints on walls all over Melbourne. The pair were inspired to do this by Yves Klein, who had used women as paintbrushes for his Anthropométries in the 1960s. Around this time, she started making music as an outlet for what she wanted to say. Her first EP, Eight, was released in 2018 and recounted her experiences of poverty and foster care. In early 2019, she released "Lie and Look", a trap song about a deteriorating relationship. She accompanied this with a music video in which she played in the woods with a miniature version of herself.

Sparkes released the album The Line in March 2019, which Shaad D'Souza of The Fader described as "a raw and uncompromising EP of no-holds-barred noise rap and electronic abrasion". Among The Line's new tracks was "The Question", which accused Jones of abuse; after Die Antwoord's lawyer sent a cease and desist letter, she uploaded a music video for the track. She subsequently filed a police report that stated that she had been the victim of non-consensual porn and accused Jones of sexually assaulting her.

In May 2019, she featured on Ängie's "Orgy of Enemies"; by the end of the year, she had also released the single "I Won't Sell My Soul". The following April, she released the single "Dirtbike", which discussed her father's drug addiction and a boyfriend of her mother who had the nickname "Donkey Dick". She followed this with "Dirt on the Name of Steven", a track about her father, and then The Zheani Sparkes EP, the latter in May 2020. The Zheani Sparkes EP discussed her upbringing, her father's death and the violence she witnessed during her childhood. That July, she released a video for the EP's track "Lava". Sparkes released the track "Skin Walker" in November 2020, which she named after an insult on Tumblr that happened to be the name of a witch in Navajo mythology. The following month, she criticised Triple J for playing her as part of their Unearthed radio station, following which Bridget Hustwaite alleged that she had uploaded her music to the platform for that purpose.

In April 2021, she featured on 4s4ski's "Fairytale".; by October, she had supported The Veronicas and signed to Dirty Hit. That month, she released "Fuck the Hollywood Cult", a track about allegations of abuse against famous entertainers; its point-of-view video was inspired by The Prodigy's "Smack My Bitch Up". Sparkes then released "Napalm" in January 2022 alongside a video followed by "Designer Sadness", a track about insecurities caused by marketing. The latter, as well as the EP I Hate People on the Internet, were both released in March 2022; I Hate People featured all three tracks and "Skin Walker". She wrote most of the EP in the mountains of New South Wales and about abuse she had received online. Later that month, she won Emerging Artist of the Year at that year's Queensland Music Awards, also winning its Heavy Award.

Sparkes released "Pathetic Waste" in June 2023, a track about the effects of her own feelings of inadequacy, followed by the August 2023 double A-side single "Bring Wet Cunt"/"Hammerhead". "Hammerhead" was written about her father, and "Bring Wet Cunt" was the subject of an Australian Broadcasting Corporation complaint in 2024 after Triple J played the track uncensored on Unearthed. The station defended playing the track's language as "justified in the context of a track by an Australian rapper". "Pathetic Waste", "Bring Wet Cunt", and "Hammerhead" all featured on her EP The Spiritual Meat Grinder later in August 2023; the album had been delayed from March due to Sparkes breaking her foot a month earlier. By the time of its release, she had been diagnosed with attention deficit hyperactivity disorder.

In March 2024, she released the single "Spoils of War", a track about the tragic journeys suffered by heroic women. She was scheduled to play that year's Great Escape Festival, but dropped out over its sponsorship by Barclays. She then released "Sex Never Dies" in August 2024, a track about repetition.

== Artistry ==
Following the release of "Lie and Look", the song's sound was dubbed "fairy trap"; Katie Cunningham of Red Bull wrote in June 2020 that Sparkes's sound moved between that and "abrasive gothic electronica with screamo vocals". Writing in March 2022, ABC described her music as "big pop hooks" thrown "in a vat of acid" and sent to "your local witches coven", while Jasleen Dhindsa of The Line of Best Fit described her in December 2023 as "part nymph, part alien, a shadowbanned lovechild between Grimes and Mew-Two" [sic].

== Discography ==
=== EP ===
- 2018 - Eight (debut mixtape/ep)
- 2019 - The Line (EP)
- 2019 - Satanic Prostitute (EP)
- 2020 - The Zheani Sparkes EP
- 2022 - I Hate People on the Internet (EP)
- 2023 - The Spiritual Meat Grinder (mixtape)
- 2025 - Long Live the Old Dead Gods (full debut album)

=== Singles ===
- 2018 - "Lizard Queen"
- 2018 - "Meaning > Happiness"
- 2018 - "Melt Away"
- 2018 - "Darker Emptier Simpler"
- 2019 - "Lie and Look"
- 2019 - "Lulu"
- 2019 - "I Won't Sell My Soul"
- 2020 - "Dirtbike"
- 2020 - "Dirt on the Name of Steven"
- 2020 - "Skin Walker"
- 2020 - "Brave New World"
- 2021 - "Fuck the Hollywood Cult"
- 2022 - "Napalm"
- 2022 - "Designer Sadness"
- 2023 - "Pathetic Waste"
- 2023 - "Bring Wet Cunt"/"Hammerhead"
- 2024 - "Spoils of War"
- 2024 - "Sex Never Dies"
- 2025 - "Naked"
- 2025 - “Drunken God”
