= Brockhampton discography =

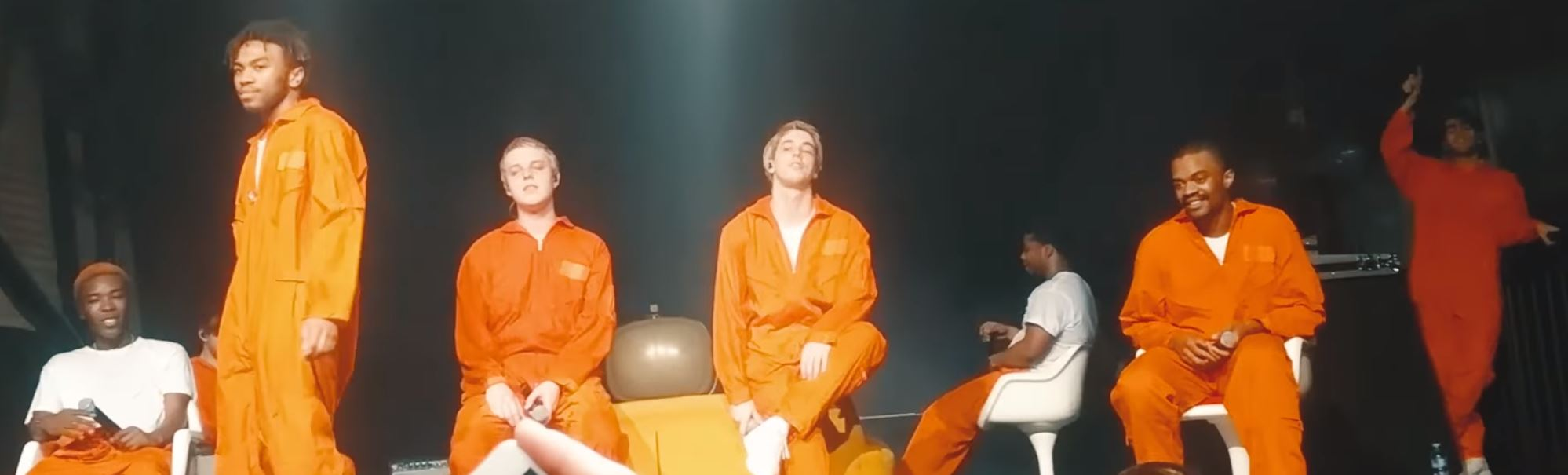
- Brockhampton in 2018
- Studio albums: 8
- Compilation albums: 4
- Singles: 39
- Music videos: 42
- Mixtapes: 1

Brockhampton was an American hip-hop collective. Formed in 2010, they have released eight studio albums, four compilations, one mixtape, 27 singles, and 38 music videos. Originally formed as AliveSinceForever in 2010 and after releasing a compilation and extended play under the name in 2012 and 2013 respectively, the group rebranded to Brockhampton, proclaiming themselves as "the world's greatest boy band". The collective's lineup underwent significant changes in 2014 alongside this rebrand. After releasing singles throughout 2015, the group's debut mixtape, All-American Trash, was released for free on March 24, 2016.

Throughout 2017, Brockhampton released three studio albums, collectively known as the "Saturation trilogy". The first, Saturation, was released through Question Everything, Inc. and Empire Distribution on June 9, 2017. The second album, Saturation II, was released on August 25, 2017, which debuted at number 57 on the Billboard 200, and also charted in Canada and New Zealand. The conclusion to the trilogy, Saturation III, followed on December 15, 2017, debuting at number 15 on the Billboard 200 and at number 5 on the Top R&B/Hip-Hop Albums, additionally charting in Canada. A fourth studio album, Iridescence, was released on September 21, 2018. It debuted at number one on the Billboard 200.

== Albums ==
=== Studio albums ===
List of studio albums, with selected chart positions
Title	Album details	Peak chart positions								Certifications
Title	Album details	US	US R&B/HH	AUS	BEL (FL)	CAN	IRE	NZ	UK	Certifications
Saturation	Released: June 9, 2017; Label: Question Everything, (Note: Question Everything, Inc. was formerly known as Brockhampton Records) Empire; Formats: Streaming, digital download, LP	—	—	—	—	—	—	—	—	
Saturation II	Released: August 25, 2017; Label: Question Everything, Empire; Formats: Streaming, digital download, LP	57	34	—	108	50	—	35	—	RMNZ: Gold
Saturation III	Released: December 15, 2017; Label: Question Everything, Empire; Formats: Streaming, digital download, LP	15	5	—	—	59	—	— (Note: Saturation III did not enter the NZ Top 40 Albums Chart, but peaked at number one on the NZ Heatseeker Albums Chart.)	—	RMNZ: Gold
Iridescence	Released: September 21, 2018; Label: Question Everything, RCA; Formats: Streaming, digital download, cassette, LP	1	1	6	47	6	8	2	20	
Ginger	Released: August 23, 2019; Label: Question Everything, RCA; Formats: Streaming, digital download, LP	3	2	3	20	10	6	3	11	RMNZ: Platinum
Roadrunner: New Light, New Machine	Released: April 9, 2021; Label: Question Everything, RCA; Formats: Streaming, digital download, LP, CD, cassette	11	6	6	35	17	11	5	24	
The Family	Released: November 17, 2022; Label: Question Everything, RCA; Formats: Streaming, digital download, CD	15	7	90	—	—	—	—	98	
TM	Released: November 18, 2022; Label: Question Everything, RCA; Formats: Streaming, digital download, CD	100	43	—	—	—	—	—	—	

=== Compilation albums ===
Title	Album details
Saturation Boxset	Released: December 15, 2017; Label: Question Everything, Inc; Format: 4×CD/DVD; Includes Saturation, Saturation II, Saturation III, the previously unreleased Saturation Drafts and a 150+ minute documentary on the making of the trilogy.
Saturation Drafts (Note: "Saturation Drafts" was only released as a CD in the Saturation Boxset. The mixtape features unreleased material from the band recorded in the Saturation, Saturation II, and Saturation III sessions.)	Released: December 15, 2017; Label: Question Everything, Inc., Empire; Format: CD

=== Mixtapes ===
List of mixtapes, with selected details
Title	Album details
All-American Trash	Released: March 30, 2016; Label: Question Everything, Inc; Format: Digital download

=== Song series ===
Title	Album details
Technical Difficulties Radio	Released: May 9–30, 2020; Label: Question Everything, Inc; Format: Digital download

== Singles ==
Title	Year	Peak chart positions								Certifications	Album(s)
Title	Year	US	AUS	CAN	IRE	NZ	NZ Hot	SWE	UK	Certifications	Album(s)
"Bet I"	2015	—	—	—	—	—	—	—	—		Non-album singles
"Hero"	2015	—	—	—	—	—	—	—	—		Non-album singles
"Dirt"	2015	—	—	—	—	—	—	—	—		Non-album singles
"Flip Mo"	2016	—	—	—	—	—	—	—	—		All-American Trash
"Cannon"	2017	—	—	—	—	—	—	—	—		Non-album single
"Face"	2017	—	—	—	—	—	—	—	—	RIAA: Gold; RMNZ: Gold	Saturation
"Heat"	2017	—	—	—	—	—	—	—	—		Saturation
"Gold"	2017	—	—	—	—	—	—	—	—	RIAA: Gold; RMNZ: Gold	Saturation
"Star"	2017	—	—	—	—	—	—	—	—		Saturation
"Gummy"	2017	—	—	—	—	—	—	—	—		Saturation II
"Swamp"	2017	—	—	—	—	—	—	—	—		Saturation II
"Junky"	2017	—	—	—	—	—	—	—	—		Saturation II
"Sweet"	2017	—	—	—	—	—	—	—	—	RIAA: Gold; RMNZ: Gold	Saturation II
"Boogie"	2017	—	—	—	—	— (Note: "Boogie" did not enter the NZ Top 40 Singles Chart, but peaked at number four on the NZ Heatseeker Singles Chart.)	—	—	—	RMNZ: Gold	Saturation III
"Stains"	2017	—	—	—	—	—	—	—	—		Saturation III
"Rental"	2017	—	—	—	—	—	—	—	—		Saturation III
"Zipper"	2017	—	—	—	—	—	—	—	—		Saturation III
"1999 Wildfire"	2018	—	—	—	—	—	—	—	—	RIAA: Gold; RMNZ: Gold	Non-album singles
"1998 Truman"	2018	—	—	—	—	—	—	—	—		Non-album singles
"1997 Diana"	2018	—	—	—	—	—	—	—	—		Non-album singles
"J'ouvert"	2018	—	—	—	92	—	10	—	—		Iridescence
"San Marcos"	2018	—	—	—	—	—	—	—	—		Iridescence
"New Orleans"	2018	—	—	—	—	—	7	—	—		Iridescence
"I Been Born Again"	2019	—	—	—	—	—	12	—	—		Ginger
"If You Pray Right"	2019	—	—	—	—	—	19	—	—		Ginger
"Boy Bye"	2019	—	—	—	69	—	15	—	—	RIAA: Gold	Ginger
"No Halo"	2019	—	65	—	50	—	8	—	76	RMNZ: Gold	Ginger
"Sugar"	2019	66	19	21	36	12	9	98	58	RIAA: 2× Platinum; ARIA: Platinum; BPI: Gold; MC: Platinum; RMNZ: 3× Platinum	Ginger
"Buzzcut" (featuring Danny Brown)	2021	—	—	—	—	—	28	—	—		Roadrunner: New Light, New Machine
"Count On Me"	2021	—	—	—	—	—	10	—	—		Roadrunner: New Light, New Machine
"Hollywood Swinging"	2021	—	—	—	—	—	—	—	—		Minions: The Rise of Gru (soundtrack)
"Big Pussy"	2022	—	—	—	—	—	30	—	—		The Family
"The Ending"	2022	—	—	—	—	—	37	—	—		The Family
"—" denotes a recording that did not chart or was not released in that territory.

== Other charted songs ==
Title	Year	Peak chart positions	Certifications	Album(s)
Title	Year	NZ Hot	Certifications	Album(s)
"Bleach"	2017	— (Note: "Bleach" did not enter the NZ Hot Singles Chart, but peaked at number eight on the NZ Heatseeker Singles Chart.)	RIAA: Gold; BPI: Silver; RMNZ: Platinum	Saturation III
"New Orleans"	2018	7		Iridescence
"Berlin"	2018	15		Iridescence
"Weight"	2018	16		Iridescence
"Heaven Belongs to You"	2019	13		Ginger
"St. Percy"	2019	12		Ginger
"Chain On" (featuring JPEGMafia)	2021	20		Roadrunner: New Light, New Machine
"Bankroll" (featuring ASAP Rocky and ASAP Ferg)	2021	11		Roadrunner: New Light, New Machine
"The Light"	2021	19		Roadrunner: New Light, New Machine
"Windows" (featuring SoGone SoFlexy)	2021	18		Roadrunner: New Light, New Machine
"New Shoes"	2022	39		TM
"Man on the Moon"	2022	40		TM

== Guest appearances ==
Title	Year	Album(s)
"MVP"	2021	Space Jam: A New Legacy (Original Motion Picture Soundtrack)

== Music videos ==
List of music videos
Title	Year	Album(s)	Director(s)
"Bet I"	2015	—N/a	Henock Sileshi
"Dirt"	2015	—N/a	Tyler Mitchell
"Flip Mo" (Merlyn Wood featuring Dom McLennon)	2016	All-American Trash	Kevin Abstract
"Cannon"	2017	—N/a	Kevin Abstract
"Face"	2017	Saturation	Kevin Abstract
"Heat"	2017	Saturation	Kevin Abstract
"Gold"	2017	Saturation	Kevin Abstract
"Star"	2017	Saturation	Kevin Abstract
"Lamb"	2017	Saturation Drafts	Kevin Abstract
"Gummy"	2017	Saturation II	Kevin Abstract
"Swamp"	2017	Saturation II	Kevin Abstract
"Junky"	2017	Saturation II	Kevin Abstract
"Sweet"	2017	Saturation II	Kevin Abstract
"Follow"	2017	Saturation Drafts	Kevin Abstract
"Boys"	2017	Saturation	Kevin Abstract
"Boogie"	2017	Saturation III	Kevin Abstract
"Billy Star" (Note: "Billy Star" is a short film composed of "Bleach", "Nation", "Team", and two unreleased tracks, "Quiver" and "Saturation 333".)	2017	Saturation III	Kevin Abstract
"Rental"	2017	Saturation III	Kevin Abstract
"Zipper"	2017	Saturation III	Spencer Ford
"1999 Wildfire"	2018	—N/a	Kevin Abstract
"1998 Truman"	2018	—N/a	Kevin Abstract
"1997 Diana"	2018	—N/a	Kevin Abstract
"Ready for War" (Note: "Ready for War" is a part of the documentary film, The Longest Summer in America.)	2018	—N/a	Kevin Abstract
"J'ouvert"	2018	Iridescence	Spencer Ford
"San Marcos"	2018	Iridescence	Kevin Abstract
"New Orleans"	2018	Iridescence	Kevin Abstract
"Thug Life"	2018	Iridescence	Kevin Abstract
"I Been Born Again"	2019	Ginger	Spencer Ford
"If You Pray Right"	2019	Ginger	Spencer Ford
"Boy Bye"	2019	Ginger	Spencer Ford
"No Halo"	2019	Ginger	Spencer Ford
"Heaven Belongs to You"	2019	Ginger	Kevin Abstract
"Dearly Departed"	2019	Ginger	Kevin Abstract
"Sugar"	2019	Ginger	Kevin Abstract
"Sugar" (Note: Due to NSFW content and nudity included in the original music video, an alternate version was released intended for a younger audience.)	2020	Ginger	Kevin Abstract
"Buzzcut" (featuring Danny Brown)	2021	Roadrunner: New Light, New Machine	Kevin Abstract, Dan Streit
"The Top of the Mountain" (Note: "The Top of the Mountain" is a music video composed of the tracks "Chain On" and "Dear Lord" from their album, Roadrunner: New Light, New Machine)	2021	Roadrunner: New Light, New Machine	Julien Klincewikz
"Brockhampton Presents: Count On Me" (Note: "Brockhampton Presents: Count On Me" is a music video composed of the tracks "Count On Me" and "Roberto's Interlude" from their album, Roadrunner: New Light, New Machine)	2021	Roadrunner: New Light, New Machine	Kevin Abstract, Dan Streit
"Don't Shoot Up the Party"	2021	Roadrunner: New Light, New Machine	Dan Streit, Cole Kush
"Big Pussy" (Note: The title of the music video on YouTube is censored to "Big Pu**y", due to its NSFW nature.)	2022	The Family	Alex Huggins, Harrison Fishman
"The Ending"	2022	The Family	Joshuah Melnick
"RZA"	2022	The Family	Alex Huggins
"New Shoes"	2022	TM	Matt Champion, Onda
"Basement"	2022	The Family	Alex Huggins
"Man on the Moon"	2022	TM	Matt Champion

== Related groups ==
=== AliveSinceForever ===
AliveSinceForever was a group formed by Kevin Abstract in 2009 that served as a predecessor to Brockhampton. Although the majority of Brockhampton members were formerly part of AliveSinceForever, AliveSinceForever is regarded by Brockhampton members to be a separate group. Main members included Brockhampton members Abstract, Matt Champion, and Dom McLennon, former Brockhampton members including Ameer Vann and Rodney Tenor (then going by the name MiC Kurb), and others such as Deon and Sage Williams.

==== Compilation albums ====
Title	Album details
The Compilation	Released: July 29, 2012; Label: Self-released; Format: Digital download

==== Extended plays ====
Title	EP details
The ASF EP	Released: July 29, 2013; Label: Self-released; Format: Digital download

=== NoWifi ===
NoWifi (stylized as NOWIFIII) was a chillwave band founded by four undisclosed members of Brockhampton (under the pseudonyms Milo, Cain, Gi, and Cohen) in 2014. It is theorized that the group consisted of Kevin Abstract, bearface, Romil Hemnani, and Henock "HK" Sileshi respectively, due to faces on the cover art, the vocalist's voices, and other clues. The group released one album.

Title	Album details
Memorial Day	Released: May 30, 2015; Label: Self-released; Format: Digital download
