= Technical Difficulties Radio =

2020 song series by Brockhampton

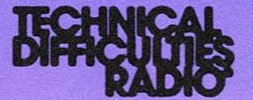

Recording by Brockhampton
- Released: May 9–30, 2020
- Studios: Kaufman Studios, Los Angeles, California
- Genre: West Coast hip hop
- Label: Question Everything
- Producers: Romil Hemnani; Jabari Manwa; Kiko Merley; Kevin Abstract

Brockhampton chronology
Ginger (2019)	Technical Difficulties Radio (2020)	Roadrunner: New Light, New Machine (2021)

Technical Difficulties Radio, also simply referred to as Technical Difficulties, was a series of livestreams and associated free music releases by American rap collective Brockhampton during the COVID-19 lockdowns in 2020. Throughout the month of May, tracks were previewed on livestreams and released in sets of two or three each Friday on the group's website. Each set of singles was removed upon the release of the next tracks. The singles were self-released without the involvement of the group's label, RCA Records. The songs feature guest appearances from Ryan Beatty, Christian Alexander, and JPEGMafia.

The series marked the performance debut of Brockhampton member Jabari Manwa, who had previously served solely as a producer. Matt Champion's presence was also noted, with Wren Graves of Consequence of Sound claiming that "it almost feels like the rest of Brockhampton are guesting on his solo project".

== History ==
On May 8, 2020, Brockhampton hosted a password-protected Twitch livestream entitled Technical Difficulties Radio. As part of the stream, Kevin Abstract announced the release of two Brockhampton albums in 2020, along with the promise of weekly, non-album singles each Friday. The same day, "N.S.T" and "Things Can't Stay The Same" were released to the group's YouTube channel and website. On May 10, "Things Can't Stay The Same" was reuploaded with different cover art, as the original cover used a painting by Jenna Gribbon without her approval.

On May 15, the group followed up with "M.O.B" and "Twisted", released in the same manner as the previous singles. At the same time, "N.S.T" and "Things Can't Stay The Same" were deleted, a pattern that would continue for the remainder of the series. On May 22, "I.F.L", "Downside", and "Baby Bull" were released, and the previous set of singles were made unavailable. On May 29, the final set of singles, "Chain On/Hold Me" and "Fishbone", were released.

Aside from the nine tracks that were released as singles, several other songs were previewed on the livestreams, including "Bankroll", "Edamame", "Keep It Southern", and "Man on the Moon".

=== Official releases ===
Finished versions of "Bankroll" and "Chain On" (the first half of "Chain On/Hold Me") were included on the group's sixth studio album, Roadrunner: New Light, New Machine, released on April 9, 2021. On May 18, Abstract expressed a desire to officially release the remaining Technical Difficulties tracks, although he cited sample clearance as an obstacle.

On November 18, 2022, "Man on the Moon" and "Keep It Southern" were released as part of Brockhampton's final studio album, TM. The next day, during the group's final concert at The Fonda Theatre, "N.S.T" and "Baby Bull" made their live debuts, marking the only time Technical Difficulties songs were performed live.

== Composition ==
Several of the songs in the series utilize a "Pardon the, uh, technical difficulties" tag that is sampled from an unreleased freestyle by Jay-Z and Big L.

The first single, "Things Can't Stay The Same", is "hard hitting rap track" with a freestyle structure built around a chipmunk soul sample of "Trouble Will Find Me" by Amnesty. Kevin Abstract's verse received praise from Sophie Walker of The Forty-Five, who positively compared it to his work on the Saturation trilogy. However, she declared Matt Champion the best performer, stating that he "crackles with electricity" and complimenting his synergy with the instrumental.

"N.S.T" is reminiscent of West Coast and Southern hip hop, with "body-slam basslines" and a lo-fi instrumental, according to Walker. The track features performances from Abstract, Champion, Jabari Manwa, and Bearface, with the latter's "playful" verse containing references to WWE champion Stone Cold Steve Austin. Wren Graves of Consequence of Sound described Manwa's verse as "welcome", and praised Champion's "scene-stealing, face-melting performance" on both "N.S.T" and "Things Can't Stay The Same". Walker also cited Champion as a highlight, describing him as having an "anarchic spirit with a quickfire verse that knocks it out the park".

"M.O.B" features a sample of "Shake Your Booty" by Bunny Sigler that transitions into a "stripped-back loop that builds, adding layers of finger snaps, skittering hi-hat, and slippery bass". Nina Corcoran of Consequence of Sound compared the song to that of the group's debut, Saturation (2017). "Twisted" sports a "blown-out and slowed-down beat", and features guest performances from Ryan Beatty and Christian Alexander. Corcoran compared the verses to Frank Ocean's writing.

"I.F.L" is another West Coast rap song, and Champion again plays a lead role. Kath Jiang of CelebMix called the raps "catchy" and "addictive", while Graves said that "Champion runs wild on 'I.F.L'", and compared the instrumental to Dr. Dre's 2001.

In contrast with the other singles, "Downside" is built around a "pensive" piano melody. Champion and frequent collaborator Ryan Beatty are the sole performers, with the former's verse serving as an "inspirational ode", in the words of Graves. "Baby Bull" begins with the same instrumental, but transitions into a guitar-based R&B track with a chorus from Bearface and verses from Merlyn Wood, Joba, and Champion. Jiang compared "Baby Bull" to the group's double platinum single "Sugar", describing "Baby Bull" as a "spicier" version of "Sugar".

"Chain On/Hold Me" utilizes a litany of samples, including "C.R.E.A.M." by Wu-Tang Clan, "Mad Crew" and "Sound of da Police" by KRS-One, and "We Almost Lost Detroit" by Gil Scott-Heron and Brian Jackson. Baltimore rapper JPEGMafia contributes a guest verse, containing references to That's So Raven, Lance Armstrong, Dua Lipa, Vine, and Street Fighter. The track also features performances from Abstract and Joba. "Fishbone" features autotune-laden singing from Manwa along with performances from Joba, Dom McLennon, Abstract, Bearface, and Wood.

== Songs ==
Song	Released	Notes
"Things Can't Stay The Same"	May 8, 2020	Reuploaded on May 10 with revised cover art. Removed on May 15.
"N.S.T"	May 8, 2020	Removed on May 15.
"M.O.B"	May 15	Removed on May 22.
"Twisted" (featuring Ryan Beatty and Christian Alexander)	May 15	Removed on May 22.
"I.F.L"	May 22	Removed on May 29.
"Downside" (featuring Ryan Beatty)	May 22	Removed on May 29.
"Baby Bull"	May 22	Removed on May 29.
"Chain On/Hold Me" (featuring JPEGMafia)	May 29	"Chain On" was later included on Roadrunner: New Light, New Machine (2021). Removed on June 5.
"Fishbone"	May 29	Removed on June 5.

=== Other previewed songs ===
Song	Notes
"Bankroll" (featuring ASAP Rocky)	Originally teased in 2018 in a trailer for the I'll Be There Tour. Previewed during a Technical Difficulties Radio livestream. A finished version was later included on Roadrunner: New Light, New Machine (2021).
"Edamame"	Played during a Technical Difficulties Radio livestream.
"Keep It Southern"	Premiered during a Technical Difficulties Radio livestream. A finished version was included on TM (2022).
"Man on the Moon"	Premiered during a Technical Difficulties Radio livestream. A finished version was included on TM (2022).
