= All-American Trash =

Mixtape by Brockhampton
- Released: March 30, 2016
- Studio: Brockhampton Factory, San Marcos, Texas
- Genre: Hip hop
- Length: 39:30
- Label: Brockhampton Records
- Producer: Joba; Romil Hemnani; Jeff Kleinman; Rodney Tenor; Albert Gordon; Bearface; Jabari Manwa; Dom McLennon

Brockhampton chronology
All-American Trash (2016)	Saturation (2017)

Singles from All-American Trash
- 1. "Flip Mo" Released: March 24, 2016

All-American Trash is the only mixtape by American rap collective and boy band Brockhampton. It was self-released on March 30, 2016, and features performances from Brockhampton members Ameer Vann, Merlyn Wood, Kevin Abstract, Rodney Tenor, Joba, Matt Champion, Bearface, and Dom McLennon. The bulk of production was handled by group members Romil Hemnani and Joba, with Tenor, Albert Gordon, Bearface, Jabari Manwa, and McLennon also receiving credits, along with guest producer Jeff Kleinman. Additionally, Ariel Wendt and group member HK perform spoken-word sections.

The mixtape's release was preceded by a music video for "Flip Mo", performed by Wood featuring McLennon. All-American Trash was released to positive reception, although retrospectives were critical, often negatively comparing the project to the groups future work. All-American Trash was also the groups only release with Tenor and Gordon, both of whom departed the group prior to the release of their debut studio album Saturation in 2017.

== Release ==
All-American Trash was released on March 30, 2016, as a free download from the groups website and on streaming service SoundCloud via Brockhampton Records.

On April 15, a documentary surrounding the mixtape's creation was released by the group. The documentary was directed by HK, who also contributed the cover art for the project.

== Critical reception ==
Upon release, All-American Trash was met with generally positive reception. Craig Jenkins of Vice commented on the project's sonic variety, describing the group as "multi-talented and unconfined by the boundaries of genre". He also singled out "Infatuation" as a highlight, praising the lush production, "vocals [that] walk the thin line between rapping and singing", and referential lyrics. Alex Siber of Complex also found variety to be the tape's strength, whereas Joe Price complimented the talent displayed by the group, writing that "Each member gets a chance to shine here, with not a single moment wasted, focusing on every talent in the group equally. There’s a broad display of what Brockhampton is capable of here, both as solo artists and a cohesive unit".

Retrospective reviews were more critical of the project, and often negatively compared All-American Trash to the groups later work. Moises Taveras of Paste listed All-American Trash as the groups worst project following the release of Roadrunner: New Light, New Machine (2021). HotNewHipHop's Caleb Hardy similarly ranked All-American Trash at the bottom of their discography, with TM (2022) being the only project ranked lower. He also criticized the projects slow-pace.

All-American Trash was included by Pitchfork in their list of "9 Great Rap Mixtapes You Might Have Missed This Year" on July 6, 2016. In November 2017, "Cotton Hollow" and "Home" were recognized by Pitchfork as emblematic of the groups sound.

== Track listing ==
All-American Trash track listing
No.	Title	Writer(s)	Producer(s)	Length
1.	"Encino"	Ameer Vann; Ian Simpson; Henock Sileshi	Joba	1:51
2.	"Ben Carson"	Matthew Champion; Albert Gordon; William Wood; Vann	Romil Hemnani	2:25
3.	"Michigan"	Jeff Kleinman; I. Simpson	Kleinman	3:08
4.	"Infatuation"	Russell Boring; I. Simpson; Wood; Michael Kirby	Hemnani	3:01
5.	"Breakfast"	Vann; I. Simpson	Kleinman	1:25
6.	"Mosscliff"	Sileshi; I. Simpson	Hemnani	1:55
7.	"Contacts"	Michael Kirby	Rodney Tenor	1:31
8.	"Palace"	Boring; Champion; Ciarán McDonald	Joba; Albert Gordon; Kiko Merley^{[a]}; Jabari Manwa^{[a]}	4:31
9.	"Flip Mo"	Wood; Dominique Simpson	Joba; Romil Hemnani; Manwa^{[a]}; Connor Barkhouse^{[a]}	2:19
10.	"Home"	Boring; Champion; McDonald	Bearface	5:11
11.	"Cotton Hollow"	Wood; D. Simpson; Gordon	Manwa; Dom McLennon	4:18
12.	"Poison"	Boring; Champion; Vann	Hemnani; Gordon; Joba^{[a]}	3:20
13.	"Lost in Love"	I. Simpson; Boring	Joba; Hemnani	4:35
Total length:				39:30

Notes

- ^{^[a]}signifies an additional producer.
- All tracks are stylized in all caps, e.g. "Palace" is displayed as "PALACE".

Samples and interpolations

- "Ben Carson" contains an interpolation of "All Falls Down" by Kanye West, written by West and Lauryn Hill.
- "Infatuation" contains an interpolation of "Flying High" by Travis Scott featuring Toro y Moi, written by the two along with Pharrell Williams, Mike Dean, and Allen Ritter. "Flying High" in turn contains a portion of "Slide" by Slave, written by Mark Adams, Carter Bradley, Tim Dozier, Mark Hicks, Tom Lockett Jr., Floyd Miller, Danny Webster, and Orion Wilhoite.
- "Home" contains a sample of "Forever 1" by Hudson Mohawke featuring Oliver St. Louis and Dorian Concept.

== Personnel ==
Brockhampton

- Russell "Joba" Boring – performance (tracks 4, 8, 12, 13), production (tracks 1, 8, 9, 13), mixing (tracks 1, 2, 4, 6–13), mastering, additional vocals (track 10), additional production (track 12), executive production
- Kevin Abstract – performance (tracks 3–5), additional vocals (track 13), creative direction, executive production
- Ameer Vann – performance (tracks 1, 2, 5, 12)
- Merlyn Wood – performance (tracks 2, 4, 9, 11)
- Rodney Tenor – performance (tracks 4, 7), production (track 7), guitar (track 7)
- Matt Champion – performance (tracks 8, 10, 12), additional vocals (track 10)
- Ciarán "Bearface" McDonald – performance (tracks 8, 10), production (track 10), additional vocals (track 10)
- Dom McLennon – performance (tracks 9, 11), production (track 11)
- Henock "HK" Sileshi – performance (track 1), graphic design, creative direction
- Romil Hemnani – production (tracks 2, 4, 6, 9, 13), executive production
- Albert Gordon – production (tracks 8, 12)
- Jabari Manwa – production (track 11), additional production (track 8)
- Kiko Merley – additional production (track 8)
- Robert Ontenient – web development

Additional personnel

- Ariel Wendt – performance (track 6)
- Jeff Kleinman – production (tracks 3, 5), mixing (tracks 3, 5)
- Roy Blair – additional vocals (track 3)
- Connor Barkhouse – additional production (track 9)
