= Sugar (Brockhampton song) =

Single by Brockhampton

Single by Brockhampton featuring Dua Lipa (Note: Dua Lipa is only featured on the remix version of "Sugar".)

from the album Ginger
- Released: November 19, 2019
- Recorded: 2019
- Studio: The BH Factory (Los Angeles)
- Genre: Hip-hop; pop; R&B
- Length: 3:24; 3:42 (remix version)
- Label: Question Everything; RCA
- Songwriters: Matthew Champion; Ciarán McDonald; Dominique Simpson; Ian Simpson; Ryan Beatty; Jabari Manwarring; Romil Hemnani; Chuks Chiejine; Brian Casey (Note: Remix version); Dua Lipa; Jermaine Dupri; Jonathan Buck; Manuel Seal Jr.; Usher Raymond; William Wood
- Producers: Jabari Manwa; Romil Hemnani

Brockhampton singles chronology
"No Halo" (2019)	"Sugar" (2019)	"Buzzcut" (2021)

Alternative cover
- Remix version artwork

Dua Lipa singles chronology
"Physical" (2020)	"Sugar (remix)" (2020)	"Break My Heart" (2020)

Music videos
- "Sugar (version 1)" on YouTube
- "Sugar (version 2)" on YouTube

"Sugar" (Note: Stylized in all caps) is a song by American hip hop boy band Brockhampton from their fifth studio album, Ginger (2019). The song features guest vocals from Ryan Beatty. It was written by Matthew Champion, Ciarán McDonald, Dominique Simpson, Ian Simpson, Beatty, Jabari Manwarring, Romil Hemnani, and Chuks Chiejine, and was produced by Jabari Manwa and Romil Hemnani. The song impacted contemporary hit radio formats in the United States on November 19, 2019, as the album's fifth single, before being released globally on December 13, through Question Everything and RCA Records. It is a hip-hop, pop, and R&B slow jam, driven by an acoustic guitar loop. Lyrically, the themes include drug abuse, codependency, and the stress of uncertainty.

"Sugar" received positive reviews from music critics, with several naming it a highlight on Ginger. Some critics praised the song's production, as well as its boy band-qualities. The song peaked at number 66 on the US Billboard Hot 100, while charting within the top 40 of charts in Australia, Canada, Ireland, and New Zealand. It was awarded a double platinum certification in the US by the Recording Industry Association of America (RIAA), as well as platinum certifications in Australia and triple platinum in New Zealand from the Australian Recording Industry Association (ARIA) and Recorded Music NZ (RMNZ), respectively. The commercial performance of the song has been attributed to a viral dance challenge on TikTok. It was promoted with the release of two music videos, both directed by Kevin Abstract. The first one features a series of incongruous scenes after an alien interrupts a sex scene that a cartoon sun watches. The video was complimented by critics for its weirdness and sci-fi elements. The second video features the band and Beatty singing on a sound stage. Brockhampton further promoted the song in 2019 with performances on The Ellen Show and The Tonight Show Starring Jimmy Fallon.

A remix of "Sugar", featuring English singer Dua Lipa, was released as a single on March 6, 2020. The remix adds additional vocals from Lipa and Jon B., as well as new contributions from Beatty, Joba, Champion, and Bearface. It also adds Brian Casey, Lipa, Jermaine Dupri, Jon B, Manuel Seal Jr., Usher Raymond, and William Wood as writers. The remix features a sample of Usher's song "Nice & Slow" and sees Lipa joining in on the first verse, before duetting with Beatty and weaving her vocals in and out throughout, while Jon B. sings with Bearface in the third verse. In the lyrics, Lipa sings about a consuming love that makes her look past all of its negatives. Music critics complimented Lipa's performance in the remix for blending her vocals with Brockhampton. The remix was also commended for the pairing of unlikely collaborators. It was promoted through the release of a visualizer that sees Champion sitting on a basketball net.

== Writing and recording ==
In September 2018, Brockhampton released their fourth studio album Iridescence, which debuted atop the US Billboard 200 chart. Despite its chart-topping debut, the album lacked longevity and crossover hits. Going into the recording for their follow-up in early 2019, the band desired to create an album people would keep going back to that had a crossover hit. Brockhampton attempted to go back to their roots, where they would just make music as a "group and family". The band started on more than 30 songs, referred to by band member Romil Hemnani in retrospect as the "pregame warm-ups", though ultimately abandoned those songs to search for completely new inspiration. After Brockhampton invited American actor Shia LaBeouf to their Los Angeles creative space to discuss promotional ideas, band members Dom McLennon and Jabari Manwa got back into the album-making mentality. The two began working on music immediately afterwards and within 20 minutes, they had the foundation for a new song, with the help of Chuks Chiejine. Manwa met Chiejine through Nigerian artist Odunsi (The Engine), a mutual friend of theirs while Manwa was stuck in London due to visa issues.

They started with Chiejine playing a riff on the guitar, before Manwa began working on the beat. The former moved to the keys, bass, and chords, prior to the latter playing the hi-hats. McLennon was immediately inspired to write and record, and he pointed out that the beat evoked a "nostalgia of being a hungry young artist working the graveyard shift at Target". Within a few hours, McLennon had recorded his verse. At first, the song consisted of his verse and the beat. Drawing on advice he received from producer Michael Uzowuru, Hemnani decided to pitch down the song by two semitones, in an effort to discover new pockets for harmonies. The song, as well as "No Halo" and "Boy Bye", was finished that night. The following day, its mixing process began. The band developed a few other additions to the track following that, including Bearface's bridge, the rearrangement of the chords leading into the chorus, and the addition of Ryan Beatty's vocals. Beatty came up with the hook melody before him, Kevin Abstract, Manwa, and McLennon all put ideas forward, writing the hook together.

"Sugar" was written by Matthew Champion, Ciarán McDonald, Dominique Simpson, Ian Simpson, Beatty, Manwa, Hemnani, and Chiejine, with the production being handled by Manwa and Hemnani. The song was recorded by Manwarring and Hemnani at the BH Factory in Los Angeles. It was mixed by Tom Elmhirst at Electric Lady Studios in New York City, while the mastering was handled by Vlado Meller at Vlado Meller Mastering in Charleston, South Carolina. The remix version adds Brian Casey, Dua Lipa, Jermaine Dupri, Jonathan Buck, Manuel Seal Jr., Usher Raymond, and William Wood as writers.

== Music and lyrics ==
"Sugar"
A blend of hip hop, pop, and R&B, "Sugar" is anchored by an acoustic guitar loop while Brockhampton members sing about past relationships and yearning for their partners to be by their sides.

Musically, "Sugar" is a 1990s and 2000s-influenced, hip hop, pop, and R&B slow jam, with folk and funk elements. The stripped-back production is anchored by an acoustic guitar loop, while it also uses processed guitars, bubbling drums, shingles of synths, and an R&B groove. The song is centred around a melodic, Beatty-performed hook where the singer uses layered vocals over a "sparse", guitar-driven beat. He sings an anxious confessional to a crush, saying he can not sleep without thinking about this person and that he needs answers on how they feel about him. More production elements are added around Beatty's voice as the song progresses, that transform it from downtempo to upbeat.

Brockhampton sings rhythmic lyrics in falsetto harmonies that stick to Ginger's emotional and introspective themes. The lyrics of "Sugar" talk about drug abuse, codependency, and the timeless stress of uncertainty, while also seeing the band reflect on past relationships and yearn for a partner to be by their side. The verses of the song keep it hip hop, with the band members singing from a positive place, reminiscing on the good memories and focusing on their accomplishments. McLennon performs the emotional first verse with a vocoder-like drawl style, while Matt Champion sings about using drugs to cope with anxiety in the second verse; both of them rap their verses with a sense of childhood nostalgia and longing to move forward. In the bridge, Abstract raps about passports, while Bearface promises his love is real in a pre-chorus towards the end before closing the song repeating the line "Do You Love Me?"

The remix version of "Sugar" adds new vocals from Lipa and Jon B., as well as additional contributions from Beatty, Joba, Champion, and Bearface. The remix opens with Bearface sampling Usher's "Nice & Slow" (1998). Lipa uses soulful vocals and joins in on the first verse, piggy-backing off McLennon's opening line from the original version "I move mountains on my own, don't need nobody help", before reworking the rest of the lyrics. She shows up throughout the rest of the remix, duetting with Beatty in his parts while also adding backing vocals. Lipa sings about yearning, longing, and devotion, while exploring a consuming love that makes her look past all of its negatives. Jon B. sings with Bearface on a reworked third verse. Abstract's bridge remains the same, while Joba performs a new outro repeating: "I'm your Candyman/I'll be your Candyman."

For me, it's alright to not really know what you're doing. It's alright to not have it figured out in terms of relationships and love and stuff like that. I feel like it's nice to have a song that kind of speaks to that feeling of not really knowing what's up. That's my takeaway every time we perform it onstage.

— Abstract discussing the meaning of "Sugar", MTV

== Release and promotion ==
"Sugar" was released through Question Everything and RCA Records on August 23, 2019, as the second track on Brockhampton's fifth studio album Ginger. The band originally intended to release the song as the album's lead single, however it leaked in June 2019, resulting in them deciding to promote the song following the album's release. The band officially announced "Sugar" as the fifth single from Ginger in November 2019. The song was promoted to contemporary hit and rhythmic contemporary radio formats in the United States on November 7, 2019, as a promotional single. It officially impacted the former radio format on November 19 as a single. The song was released for digital download and streaming on December 13, 2019. It received playlist promotion through streaming platforms such as Spotify and Apple Music, as well as promotion on social media platform TikTok. A remix of the song featuring Lipa was released for digital download and streaming as a single on March 6, 2020. The remix was accompanied by a visualizer that sees Matt Champion sitting on top of a basketball hoop. It was sent for radio airplay in Italy on March 13, 2020, five days before being serviced to contemporary hit radio formats in Canada.

== Reception ==
"Sugar" was met with positive reviews from music critics. The song was named a highlight on Ginger by Shahlin Graves of Coup De Main Magazine, Erika Marie of HotNewHipHop, Julie Van Praet of Hot Press, Sophie Caraan of Hypebeast, Matthew Strauss of Pitchfork, Derrick Rossignol of Uproxx and the staff of Vulture. In Rolling Stone, Charles Holmes described the song as "wistful and sweet", while also mentioning that it feels like "a bold swing after the darkness" of the previous album track "No Halo". In another review from the publication, Claire Shaffer name the song one of Brockhampton's "most boy band-esque tracks", whereas The Guardian's Michael Cragg called the song "honey-soaked". Marie called the song a "noteworthy addition" to Ginger. The staff of DIY viewed it as a "sleek R&B-esque number", drawing comparisons to the band's other songs "Bleach" (2017) and "1999 Wildfire" (2018). In a review from Clash, Debbie Ijaduola said "the lyrics overpower production here, resulting in a song that's more melancholy than perhaps was intended". Dan Weiss of Consequence opined that "Sugar" shows growth for Brockhampton musically. Writing for HipHopDX, Daniel Spielberger thought it is the band's "best foray into genre-bending" on Ginger.

The Line of Best Fit writer Sophie Walker named the song a "sumptuous R'n'B throwback" while praising Bearface's contributions to it, saying "his blown-out croons fit right in". For Pitchfork, Sheldon Pearce stated that the song, alongside fellow album tracks "No Halo" and "Boy Bye", makes it seem like the production crew "has unlocked its full potential". Steven Edelstone of Paste noted that Brockhampton leans into their "capital-P Pop tendencies", while comparing Bearface's performance to JC Chasez. He went on to say "it's what a 2019 One Direction song would sound like with a Swae Lee feature". In Contactmusic.com, Max Cussons thought that the acoustic touches and "cabin-like homely" hook are reminiscent of a Fleet Foxes or Bon Iver song, alongside mentioning that Bearface's "melodious, sensual serenade" is the "show-stopper". Variety writer Brandon Yu described the song as "a sweet love song that is possibly the album's most immediately infectious track, and one of the group's best ever pop songs". The staff of Vulture called it "a perfect song to end a very heated hot gal summer", as well as "confused and melancholy". Trey Alston of MTV described "Sugar" as a "vertigo-inducing ride that takes you through a crash course of different feelings". Alex Robert Ross of The Fader viewed the song as "very chill", while the Los Angeles Times' Mikael Wood described it as "tender and silky".

Marie also complimented the remix, saying that the singers' blend of vocals work nicely while stating "the interesting mix of singers may seem like an unlikely group but they all pull things together quite nicely". Vulture's Chris Murphy stated "the remix does not disappoint" while praising Lipa's performance, saying she fits right in on the song as she "croons just like one of the boys". Van Praet also appreciated Lipa's performance, stating she "sleekly melts right alongside the rest" of Brockhampton. In Uproxx, Wongo Okon opined that Lipa "adds a new balance" to the song "as her vocals seemingly even out" its experience. In Consequence, Nina Corcoran stated that although "Lipa doesn't command any singular moment or verse", she "sleekly croons right alongside the rest" of the band. The reviewer stated "unlikely crossovers often result in some truly memorable songs", in this case "for better". For MTV, Trey Alston stated Lipa "claims the song as her own immediately", while also praising her appearance on the "final bone-chilling chorus" that makes "her case to be the next member of the group". He also complimented the "seriously sweet moment" of Jon B's and Bearface's intertwining of vocals. The Fader writer Shaad D'Souza stated the remix takes the song "one step closer to the realm of Top 40". In Complex, Joshua Espinoza said it gives "new life" to the original. Highsnobiety's Liz Bautista noted that the remix keeps the original's "cool, chill, and I-wanna-cuddle vibe" with "a few upgrades".

Vulture ranked "Sugar" as the eighth best song of 2019; writer Dee Lockett noted that it has "the hallmarks of a grade-A boy-band bop" with "airtight harmonies, an irresistible hook, and matters of the heart". In July 2020, Rolling Stone ranked it as the 73rd best boy band song of all time, stating it is "tender and honest, a heartfelt devotional filled with love, longing and just the right dash of youthful immortality", while comparing the acoustic guitar loop to that of "I Want It That Way" (1999) by the Backstreet Boys.

== Commercial performance ==
The commercial performance of "Sugar" has been attributed to a dance trend using it that went viral on TikTok. The song spent one week at number nine on the US Bubbling Under Hot 100 Singles chart, before entering the Billboard Hot 100 at number 70 on the chart dated January 18, 2020. The following week, the song reached a peak of number 66. It re-entered the chart at number 95 following the release of the remix, and spent a total of nine weeks on the chart. The song also reached respective peaks of numbers 31 and 28 on Billboard's Hot R&B/Hip-Hop Songs and Mainstream Top 40 charts. In November 2021, the song was awarded a double platinum certification by the Recording Industry Association of America (RIAA), which denotes 2,000,000 track-equivalent unit sales in the US. In January 2020, "Sugar" debuted at number 98 on the Canadian Hot 100, before peaking at number 21 in March of that year, following the release of the remix.

On the UK Singles Chart, the song debuted at number 78 in January 2020, a month before peaking at number 58. It charted for nine weeks, and was certified silver by the British Phonographic Industry (BPI) in July 2020 for 200,000 track-equivalent unit sales in the United Kingdom. Following the release of Ginger, "Sugar" debuted at number 64 on the Irish Singles Chart. On January 10, 2020, the song re-entered the chart at number 57 and reached a peak of number 36 four weeks later. It spent 14 weeks on the chart. In January 2020, the song charted for one week at number 98 in Sweden. The song was certified gold by the Polish Society of the Phonographic Industry (ZPAV) in 2021 for sales of 10,000 track-equivalent units in Poland. It received the same certification from the Associação Fonográfica Portuguesa (AFP) in December 2020, which denotes 5,000 track-equivalent unit sales in Portugal.

In Australia, "Sugar" debuted at number 37 on the ARIA Singles Chart dated January 19, 2020, before peaking at number 19 two weeks later. The song returned to that peak following the remix's release and spent 13 weeks on the chart. In 2020, for selling 70,000 track-equivalent units in Australia, the song was awarded a platinum certification by the Australian Recording Industry Association (ARIA). In New Zealand, it debuted at number 40 in January 2020. It initially peaked at number 13 the next month, before reaching number 12 following the release of the remix. The song spent 17 weeks on the chart. In April 2020, Recorded Music NZ (RMNZ) awarded the song a platinum certification for track-equivalent sales of 30,000 units in New Zealand.

== Music videos ==
=== Version 1 ===
The music video for "Sugar" was directed by Abstract and released on December 10, 2019. The band promoted the video's release on Twitter by posting rapid-fire tweets leading up its premiere. The video first premiered on MTV Live and MTVU, as well as MTV's Times Square billboard, before being released onto YouTube. The video was produced by Elara Pictures and Ways & Means, with Brandon Robinson serving as the producer, the Safdie brothers as co-producers, alongside Oscar Boyson, Lana Kim, and Jett Steiger as executive producers. Ashlan Grey was the director of photography, while Nick Lenzini handled the wardrobe styling and Nathan Blackmon did the editing. Color was handled by Irving Harvey and Sam Gursky with VFX by Frender and Max Colt, and animation by Moving Colour and Brian Covalt. The concept of the video is based on a nightmare Abstract had after he was having trouble coming up with the concept. A director's cut version was released on the band's Vimeo channel.

The first music video for "Sugar" opens with a sex scene.

The video opens with a sex scene between a man and woman, portrayed by Drew Carter and Meredeith Vancuyk, where the explicit parts are censored out and a frowning cartoon sun watches them. The sun was created by Moving Colour after a request from Ways & Means for "some old-school stop-motion, or clay-mation, similar to what we grew up with in the 80's from the California Raisins and Dominos Noid". An alien, portrayed by Bobby Keene, then creeks through the bedroom door and shoots the man in the head before singing the intro of the song. Following this, the woman screams, before McLennon and Merlyn Wood enter the room through a window. A series of incongruous scenes including an alien invasion, Matt Champion performing with the devil, also played by Bobby Keene, in hell, Abstract stuck to the ceiling by green slime, which drips onto the other members', and Bearface lying on a dirty carpet follow. The video concludes by showing a title card with the song's title.

For Complex, Trace William Cowen stated that the band "pushes themselves to a new level of creativity" with the video, while also stating it "makes clear once again, cinema is an important facet of the multi-medium approach Brockhampton has always taken when distributing their work". In Rolling Stone, Shaffer called the video "zany" and possibly Brockhampton's "most surreal" one, alongside stating that "it only gets weirder and weirder". Douglas Greenwood of i-D noticed that the video has the "weird, frenetic energy" of Uncut Gems (2019) and Good Times (1974–79) if either of those films "fornicated with an early 00s Nickelodeon TV show". The Fader writer Jordan Darville named the video "the best, most Brockhampton video yet". DIY viewed it as "sharp AF" video that "channels nostalgic sci-fi flicks", while also praising the video for being "a huge step-up in production from their previous visual releases" and stating the band has "once again shown their continuous artistic rise". For Highsnobiety, Sarah Osei called the video a "trippy, four-minute ride", whereas the Australian Broadcasting Corporation opined that it "gets progressively weirder" over its four minute length.

=== Version 2 ===
The second music video for "Sugar" takes place in a white sound stage that includes a mirror.

A second music video for "Sugar" was released on February 17, 2020, also directed by Abstract. It was shot by Ashlan Grey with color, iPhone shots, and editing by HK. The digital imaging technician was Kevin Doann, while Nick Lenzini and Weston Freas did the wardrobe styling. The second video was created because Brockhampton did not tell the entire visual story of the song with the first video. The visual has a much lower budget than the first video and takes place in an abandoned warehouse. In the warehouse, the band and Beatty perform on a sound stage that features props, including a revolving mirror, ladder, and chairs. Bearface comes to the shoot having just got out of bed with disheveled hair, while Abstract wears a Myspace t-shirt. The video ends with the performers running around the warehouse with Bearface repeating "Do you love me?" and the mirror getting wheeled away. Billboard's Michael Saponara described the video as "pretty bland for the most part".

== Live performances ==
Brockhampton delivered their first live performance of "Sugar" with Beatty on August 23, 2019, as the second song during their Friday Therapy concert at The Fonda Theatre in Los Angeles, to celebrate the release of Ginger. During their The Ellen Show debut on September 6, the band performed the song with Beatty. The performance used moving cloud graphic in the background alongside pastel flashing lights, while the band sat down on a raised platform and got up one by one to perform their respective parts. The song was included on the setlist of their Heaven Belongs to You Tour from October to December 2019. On October 24, Beatty joined Brockhampton to perform the song on The Tonight Show Starring Jimmy Fallon. They wore orange jumpsuits and performed it similarly to their performance on The Ellen Show, with each member one by one going up to perform their respective parts.

== Track listings ==
- Digital download and streaming (Note: Digital releases of "Sugar" in Australia, New Zealand, and Sweden.)
1. "Sugar" – 3:24
- Digital download and streaming – remix
1. "Sugar" (remix) [featuring Dua Lipa] – 3:42

== Personnel ==
- Brockhampton – vocals
- Jabari Manwa – production, recording
- Romil Hemnani – production, recording
- Chuks Chiejine – additional production, guitar
- Ryan Beatty – vocals
- Tom Elmhirst – mixing
- Brandon Bost – engineering, mix engineering
- Matthew Scatchell – assistant production, mix assisting
- Vlado Meller – mastering
- Louis Lion – engineering
- Playdough – miscellaneous production
- Dua Lipa – vocals
- Jon B – recording, vocals
- Lorna Blackwood – recording
- Sean Matsukawa – recording

Credits adapted from Brockhampton's website and Tidal.

== Charts ==
=== Weekly charts ===
Weekly peak performance for "Sugar"
Chart (2019–2020)	Peak position
Australia (ARIA)	19
Canada Hot 100 (Billboard)	21
Ireland (IRMA)	36
New Zealand (Recorded Music NZ)	12
Portugal (AFP)	71
Sweden (Sverigetopplistan)	98
UK Singles (Official Charts)	58
US Billboard Hot 100	66
US Hot R&B/Hip-Hop Songs (Billboard)	31
US Pop Airplay (Billboard)	28

=== Year-end charts ===
2020 year-end chart performance for "Sugar"
Chart (2020)	Position
Australia (ARIA)	60
Canada (Canadian Hot 100)	69
New Zealand (Recorded Music NZ)	41

== Certifications ==
Certifications and sales for "Sugar"
Region	Certification	Certified units/sales
Australia (ARIA)	Platinum	70,000^{‡}
Canada (Music Canada)	Platinum	80,000^{‡}
Denmark (IFPI Danmark)	Gold	45,000^{‡}
New Zealand (RMNZ)	3× Platinum	90,000^{‡}
Poland (ZPAV)	Gold	10,000^{‡}
Portugal (AFP)	Gold	5,000^{‡}
United Kingdom (BPI)	Gold	400,000^{‡}
United States (RIAA)	2× Platinum	2,000,000^{‡}
^{‡} Sales+streaming figures based on certification alone.

== Release history ==
Release dates and formats for "Sugar"
Region	Date	Format(s)	Version	Label(s)	Ref.
United States	November 7, 2019 (Note: Release as a promotional single)	Contemporary hit radio; rhythmic contemporary radio	Original	RCA	
United States	November 19, 2019	Contemporary hit radio	Original	RCA	
Various	December 13, 2019	Digital download; streaming	Original	Question Everything; RCA	
Various	March 6, 2020	Digital download; streaming	Remix	Question Everything; RCA	
Italy	March 13, 2020	Radio airplay	Remix	Sony	
Canada	March 18, 2020	Contemporary hit radio	Remix	Sony	

== See also ==
- New Zealand top 50 singles of 2020
