= Boy Bye =

2019 single by Brockhampton

Single by Brockhampton

from the album Ginger
- Released: August 15, 2019
- Recorded: April 21 – July 31, 2019
- Genre: Alternative hip hop
- Length: 2:22
- Label: Question Everything; RCA
- Songwriters: Russell Boring; Matthew Champion; Ciarán McDonald; Dominique Simpson; Ian Simpson; William Wood; Romil Hemnani; Jabari Manwarring; Isaiah Merriweather; Reza Attaei; Varoujan
- Producers: Jabari Manwa; Hemnani; Kiko Merley

Brockhampton singles chronology
"If You Pray Right" (2019)	"Boy Bye" (2019)	"No Halo" (2019)

Music video
- "Boy Bye" on YouTube

"Boy Bye" (stylized in all caps) is a song by American hip hop boy band Brockhampton, released on August 15, 2019 as the third single from their fifth studio album Ginger (2019). It contains a sample from "Ejazeh" by Dariush.

== Composition ==
The production is made up of mostly percussion with occasional melody. Lyrically, Brockhampton members rap about dealing with stress, anxiety and depression resulting from traumatic pasts, as well as self-medication.

== Music video ==
The music video was directed by Spencer Ford and released on August 14, 2019. It finds Brockhampton playing basketball (during which Dom McLennon is seen twirling the ball) and fighting while covered in blue body paint, Matt Champion dangling inside a glass box that is lifted by a forklift, Kevin Abstract being shirtless and surrounded by candles in darkness, a giant sitting in a field, Bearface in a warehouse, and Joba being chased by extraterrestrials wearing masks and silver space suits.

== Live performances ==
Brockhampton performed the song on The Ellen DeGeneres Show on September 6, 2019.

== Charts ==
Chart (2019)	Peak position
Ireland (IRMA)	69
New Zealand Hot Singles (RMNZ)	15

== Certifications ==
Certifications and sales for "Boy Bye"
Region	Certification	Certified units/sales
United States (RIAA)	Gold	500,000^{‡}
^{‡} Sales+streaming figures based on certification alone.
