= Brockhampton =

American hip-hop group

- Brockhampton pictured in 2019; clockwise from left: Dom McLennon, Matt Champion, Kevin Abstract, Romil Hemnani, Roberto Ontenient, Bearface, Joba, Merlyn Wood, Kiko Merley, Jabari Manwa, HK, Jon Nunes

Background information
- Origin: San Marcos, Texas, U.S.
- Genres: Hip-hop; alternative hip-hop; alternative R&B; pop rap
- Works: Brockhampton discography
- Years active: 2014−2022 (Note: Variously described as a breakup and an indefinite hiatus)
- Labels: Question Everything (Note: Known as Brockhampton Records until 2017); RCA; Empire
- Spinoffs: NoWifi; Q3; Video Store; Blush
- Spinoff of: AliveSinceForever
- Past members: See Band members
- Website: brckhmptn.com

Brockhampton was an American (Note: bearface and Jabari Manwa are Northern Irish and Grenadian, respectively.) hip-hop group founded in San Marcos, Texas, in 2014. Formed partially through online forums, the group was often noted for their size, diversity, and prolific discography. The group's final line-up included vocalists Kevin Abstract, Matt Champion, Merlyn Wood, and Dom McLennon, producers/vocalists Joba, Bearface, and Jabari Manwa, producers Romil Hemnani and Kiko Merley, graphic designer Henock Sileshi (HK), photographer Ashlan Grey, web designer Roberto Ontenient, and talent manager Jon Nunes.

Founded by de facto leader Kevin Abstract in 2014, Brockhampton consisted of members of the defunct Internet music collective AliveSinceForever. Their debut mixtape, All-American Trash, was independently released in 2016. After relocating to Los Angeles, the group achieved critical and commercial success with their studio albums Saturation, Saturation II, Saturation III, which were released in quick succession over six months in 2017. The next year, they signed to RCA Records, and shortly afterwards founding member Ameer Vann was removed from the group following accusations of sexual misconduct. After repeated delays, Iridescence (2018) debuted atop the Billboard 200 and earned the group a nomination at the Brit Awards. Ginger (2019) and Roadrunner: New Light, New Machine (2021) were released to similar commercial success, with the former producing the multi-platinum single "Sugar". In 2022, the group disbanded following the release of their final studio albums The Family and TM.

Generally categorized as a hip-hop collective, the group was notable in their early years for branding themselves as a boy band, in what they referred to as an effort to redefine the term. The group's size and diversity was often noted, with the group's roster containing rappers, singers, producers, photographers, and more of various sexualities, ethnicities, and nationalities. The band was also recognized for their output, having released eight studio albums within five years of their debut project.

== Career ==
=== 2009-2014: AliveSinceForever ===
In 2009, a 13-year-old Kevin Abstract (real name, Ian Simpson) made a post on the internet music discussion forum KanyeLive asking for members to form a collective. Several of the group's members were previously acquainted through the forum: producers Robert "Roberto" Ontenient and Romil Hemnani met on the website's Lupe Fiasco section, while graphic designer Henock "HK" Sileshi was well known for creating and posting custom cover art for popular songs. HK was introduced to the rest of the group after Hemnani responded positively to a 2 Chainz and Barack Obama parody cover HK had posted. Producer Jabari Manwa, who lived in Grenada, also met Abstract through the forum.

Aside from the forum, many of the group's members were recruited through prior connections. Abstract, Merlyn Wood (real name, William Wood Jr.), Matt Champion, and Ameer Vann began making music together as classmates at The Woodlands High School. Russell "Joba" Boring, who worked at a recording studio in Houston, was originally hired by the four as a recording engineer before being asked by Abstract to join the group. Hemnani, Dom McLennon (real name, Dominique Simpson), Rodney Tenor, and Jon Nunes all lived in Connecticut, and worked on music together before being recruited by Abstract. Northern Irish singer and producer Ciarán "Bearface" McDonald was introduced to Hemnani through a mutual friend during a recording session in New York City.

The collective, named AliveSinceForever, included approximately 40 members and was heavily decentralized, with each member working to establish their own solo careers in different cities. The group played several sparsely populated shows together, including an appearance at South by Southwest. In 2013, the collective released an EP, titled The ASF EP. In 2014, AliveSinceForever collaborated on Abstract's debut studio album, MTV1987; Hemnani, Champion, JOBA, Vann, Wood, HK, Ontenient, and Kiko Merley contributed to the record alongside Abstract.

=== 2014-2016: Formation and early releases ===
In late 2014, Joba moved to San Marcos, Texas, to attend Texas State University. Several members of the group, including Abstract, moved with him. Abstract, who had grown frustrated with the lack of coordination in AliveSinceForever, decided to dissolve the collective. He invited select members of AliveSinceForever to move to San Marcos to form a new group, Brockhampton, named for the street Abstract grew up on in Corpus Christi.

In January 2015, Brockhampton's debut single, "Bet I", was released alongside an accompanying video directed by HK and Franklin Mendez. By 2017, "Bet I" had been removed from all streaming platforms. "Bet I" was followed by "Hero" in June, and the same month the band were announced as the winners of the VFiles Loud Contest, winning them a professionally directed music video for their next song, "Dirt", released through Fool's Gold Records. On March 24, 2016, Brockhampton released their debut mixtape, All-American Trash, for free. In November, Abstract released his sophomore studio album American Boyfriend: A Suburban Love Story, with Hemnani, Bearface, Joba, Albert Gordon, Ashlan Gray, Ontenient, HK, and Wood receiving credits on the album.

=== 2017: Relocation to Los Angeles and Saturation trilogy ===
Immediately after the release of All-American Trash, the group relocated to a shared home in South-central Los Angeles. Around the same time, singer Rodney Tenor and producer Albert Gordon departed from the group, and photographer Ashlan Gray was invited to join. In January 2017, the group released the standalone single "Cannon" alongside the promise of solo projects from several members.

On May 3, Abstract announced the group's debut studio album, Saturation. (Note: At the time of the announcement, Saturation was marketed as a mixtape) At the time of the announcement, no writing or recording had begun, and work on the project began immediately after the announcement. The album was entirely self-made by the group, with recording, mixing, and mastering all occurring almost entirely in the band's South Central home. For the next month, the group released the singles "Face", "Heat", "Gold", and "Star" on a weekly basis, with each song accompanied by a music video directed by Abstract and filmed in South Central. Also in May, Brockhampton were announced to be the subject of the Viceland documentary series American Boyband. American Boyband premiered on June 8, the same day the group released a standalone music video for "Lamb". Saturation was released on June 9, 2017, to critical acclaim.

Following the release of Saturation, the group moved out of their house in South Central to a new home in North Hollywood. Before work on Saturation had finished, a follow-up, Saturation II, was announced. Similarly to Saturation, the album was made at the group's home in North Hollywood. "Gummy", "Swamp", "Junky", and "Sweet" were released on a weekly basis from August 1 to August 22. This was followed by the surprise release of non-album single "Follow" on August 22. Saturation II was released on August 25 to further acclaim and attention. On September 3, the group embarked on their first national tour, Jennifer's Tour, in support of Saturation I and Saturation II.

On December 1, Brockhampton officially announced Saturation III as their final studio album; however, the group later clarified that this was not a literal statement, and they were likely to release further albums. On December 12, they released the album's lead single and video, "Boogie". On December 14, 2017, Brockhampton announced their fourth studio album, Team Effort, slated for release in 2018, along with a new single from Saturation III, "Stains". Saturation III was released on December 15. The group also filmed a self-funded, self-made feature-length movie to celebrate the Saturation trilogy, directed by Kevin Abstract himself. From January 6 to March 8, 2018, the group went on their second tour, the Love Your Parents Tour in support of the Saturation trilogy.

=== 2018: RCA signing, removal of Ameer Vann, and Iridescence ===
In March 2018, Brockhampton announced that Team Effort had been delayed indefinitely, and that they would instead release their fourth studio album Puppy in mid-2018. The next week, they announced via social media that they had signed a record deal with Sony's RCA Records. Billboard reported that according to label sources, the deal was worth more than $15 million for six albums over three years. In April, one month after the conclusion of the Love Your Parents Tour, the group began another nationwide tour, the Stereo Spirit Tour.

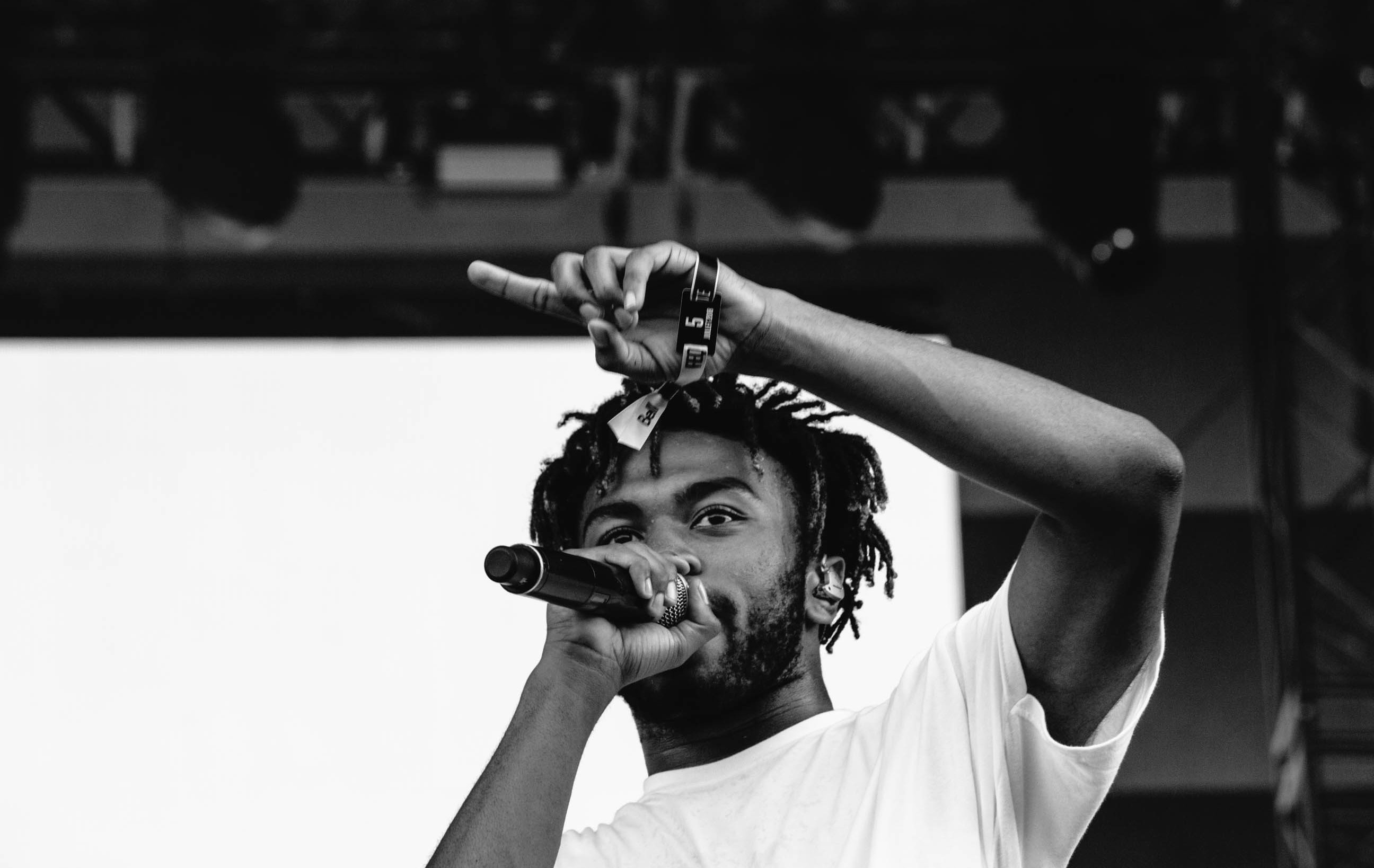
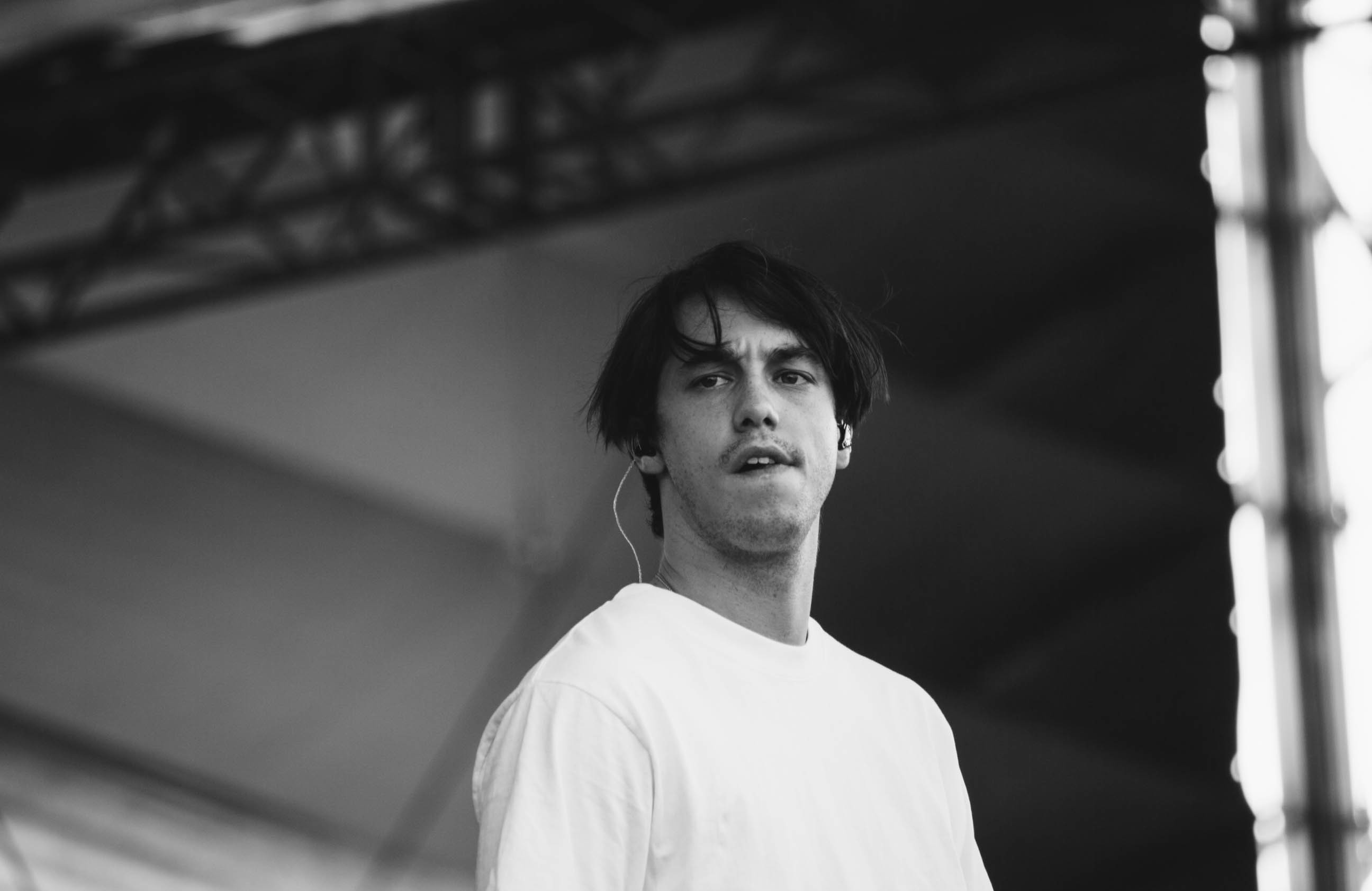
Vocalists Kevin Abstract (top) and Matt Champion (bottom) performing at Quebec City Summer Festival in 2018.

In May, Vann was accused of sexual and domestic abuse by singer-songwriter Rhett Rowan and another unidentified woman. Although Vann admitted to being mentally and verbally abusive, he denied allegations of sexual abuse. Abstract responded to the allegations on May 24, asserting that he was unaware of Vann's actions and that Vann would be held accountable by the group. He also hinted towards Puppy being delayed from its original release date. On May 27, Brockhampton announced that Vann would no longer be a part of the group, stating that they "were lied to" and apologizing "for not speaking up sooner." Subsequently, the group offered an apology to victims of sexual misconduct stating; "Brockhampton was intended to bring people together and make everyone feel safe and included, we wish to apologize to anyone who has experienced similar scenarios we wish we had acted sooner. As a band we wish to extend our apologies to those who may no longer be able to listen to our music and feel safe". In light of controversy, the group canceled the remainder of their tour dates, including an appearance at the Governors Ball Music Festival. Afterwards, it came to light through lyrics and interviews by McLennon that Vann had, whilst visiting Texas, been involved in organizing a home robbery of one of McLennon's childhood friends. McLennon revealed to interviewers that Vann "didn't have the heart" to tell the band until after he had already been kicked out.

After Vann's removal, the collective traveled to Hawaii to regroup and rework their fourth studio album. During this time, the group wrote the song "Tonya". On June 20, the band appeared on The Tonight Show Starring Jimmy Fallon, in their late-night television debut, and their first performance since announcing Vann's departure. They debuted "Tonya", accompanied by guest vocalists Jazmine Sullivan, Ryan Beatty and Serpentwithfeet, as well as revealing the new title of their upcoming album, The Best Years of Our Lives. Following the performance the band resumed their summer tour, headlining the Agenda Festival in Long Beach, California. The next month the group announced a Beats 1 radio show Things We Lost in the Fire Radio, promising "new music all summer". The show's first episode was aired on July 6, 2018, featuring the debut of single "1999 Wildfire", released that day with an accompanying music video. The track features vocals by Jazze Pha. On July 18, the single "1998 Truman" was debuted as a part of the show's second episode. A music video for the track was released later that day. On July 27, the group released the single "1997 Diana", accompanied by a music video. Later that day the song was featured on the third episode of Things We Lost in the Fire Radio, alongside the unfinished track "Don't Be Famous".

On August 26, 2018, the group announced that a new album titled Iridescence, recorded over ten days at Abbey Road Studios, would be released in September. On September 11, the group also announced a documentary film about the album's recording titled The Longest Summer in America. The film was released on September 20. The band also announced dates of their I'll Be There Tour, which began on October 3, 2018, in Mesa, Arizona, concluding on December 6, 2018, in Las Vegas, Nevada. Iridescence was officially released on September 21, and included a studio version of "Tonya" without Sullivan and Beatty. It debuted at number one on the US Billboard 200 on September 30, 2018, becoming Brockhampton's first chart-topping album. In January 2019, the band received their first ever nomination for the "Best International Group" at the BRIT Awards, which took place at The O_{2} Arena on February 20, 2019.

=== 2019: Ginger ===
Following the release of Iridescence, the band began a sixth month hiatus from group activity. During this time, several members, including JOBA, Bearface, Hemnani, Manwa, HK, and Grey worked on Abstract's third studio album, Arizona Baby. Towards the end of production on Arizona Baby, a period of writer's block experienced by Abstract prompted the group to begin work on their next studio album. Work on the album was accompanied by weekly group therapy sessions (dubbed "Friday Therapy" by the band) hosted by Abstract and led by actor Shia LaBeouf. The band credited these sessions with informing the lyrical direction of their next album. Despite the group no longer living together, like the Saturation trilogy, the bulk of recording took place at a Hollywood Hills home that was shared by the band's creative team.

On July 2, the band officially announced their fifth studio album, Ginger. Also like the Saturation trilogy, Ginger was preceded by weekly singles and music videos; "I Been Born Again", "If You Pray Right", "Boy Bye", and "No Halo" were released ahead of the album. Ginger was released on August 23, and the same day the band put on a one-off live show in Los Angeles, also titled Friday Therapy, with 100 gecs, Deb Never, JPEGMafia, and Dominic Fike serving as openers. From October to December, the band embarked on the Heaven Belongs to You Tour in support of Ginger, with 100 gecs and Slowthai as supporting acts.

The band made its first appearance on The Ellen DeGeneres Show on September 6, 2019, performing "Sugar" and "Boy Bye", though the latter was not televised. Later that same day, they performed "No Halo" with Deb Never on Jimmy Kimmel Live! The group was a guest on The Tonight Show Starring Jimmy Fallon, where they were interviewed and then performed "Sugar" with Ryan Beatty on October 24. On January 14, 2020, "Sugar" became the group's first Billboard hit, debuting at number 70 on the Billboard Hot 100 and remaining on the chart for nine weeks, peaking at number 66. On March 6, a remix version of the track featuring English singer Dua Lipa, American singer Jon B and Beatty was released. The track also became the group's first platinum record on April 29, 2020. The track received its second platinum certification on November 19, 2021.

=== 2020-2021: Technical Difficulties Radio and Roadrunner: New Light, New Machine ===
In April 2020, during the COVID-19 pandemic, the band began releasing non-studio produced singles under the title Technical Difficulties Radio to their YouTube channel. These songs were recorded during the band's self-imposed quarantine. Livestreams preceding the release of these singles were streamed on Twitch. The tracks "N.S.T", "things cant stay the same", "M.O.B", "Twisted", "I.F.L", "Baby Bull", "Downside", "Fishbone" & "Chain On / Hold Me" were released to YouTube and later taken down. Technical Difficulties Radio marked producer Jabari Manwa's first appearances as a vocalist on group projects.

Along with the single releases, members stated on the live-streams that a sixth album had been "sonically finished" and they expected it to release that summer. Abstract and HK later revealed the initials of their sixth album, RR. In August 2020, Abstract and Hemnani also started a label and apparel brand called Video Store. On January 2, 2021, a snippet of the album's lead single, "Buzzcut", was posted on Instagram. On March 24, 2021, the band released "Buzzcut", featuring Danny Brown, followed by an announcement of the album's full title, Roadrunner: New Light, New Machine. The second single, "Count On Me", was released on April 2, and the album was released worldwide on April 9. The music video for "Count On Me" was released on April 13 featuring Lil Nas X and Dominic Fike. Roadrunner was advertised by the group as their penultimate record, with the announcement of a final album to be released later that year. In June, the band contributed the track "MVP" to the Space Jam: A New Legacy soundtrack.

=== 2022: Disbandment, The Family, and TM ===
In 2021, the band held ultimately unsuccessful recording sessions in Ojai to record their final studio album. On January 14, 2022, the group announced their intentions to begin an indefinite hiatus; all dates on the Here Right Now tour in support of Roadrunner were cancelled, with the exception of their upcoming performances at The O2 Arena and Coachella, which were announced to be their final shows. Following their set at Coachella, the band confirmed that their final studio album would be released later that year.

During their hiatus from group activity, two separate albums were worked on by the band. Abstract traveled to New York City with Bearface, Hemnani, and Ryan "Boylife" Yoo. The resulting album solely featured lead vocals from Abstract, with Bearface and Boylife credited as executive producers. At the same time, Champion revisited the group's 2021 Ojai sessions, compiling the recordings into a completed album; Champion is credited as the projects executive producer.

In October, Abstract's album, The Family, was announced as the band's final studio album, with a release date in November. The album was preceded by the singles "Big Pussy" and "The Ending". On November 17, the day of the album's release, the band announced that Champion's album, TM, would also be released that night as the group's true final album in what the band billed "a parting gift" to their fans. Despite the prior announcement that Coachella would be their final performance, on the 19th, the band played their final live show, a free, live-streamed concert in Los Angeles at the Fonda Theatre. Despite Abstract's contradictory lyrics on The Family, the band iterated that the group had not broken up due to internal conflict. According to Champion, the members felt that the band had run its natural course, and wanted an opportunity to work on solo projects.

=== 2023-present: Solo work and further collaborations ===
In April 2023, Manwa began releasing singles under the moniker Saga Bouy, the first post-Brockhampton work by a former member. In November, almost one year after the group's disbandment, Abstract released his fourth studio album Blanket, with Hemnani reprising his role as a producer and engineer. In February 2024, McLennon released a EP titled Prologue, followed by an album, The Changing of the Trees, a month later. Neither project featured any former members. Champion's debut studio album Mika's Laundry, released on March 22, 2024, featured contributions from several former Brockhampton members, including Hemnani, Bearface, Manwa, and Merley. Hemnani also contributed production to Champion's first EP Slint's Favorite, which was released later that year. In September, JOBA's debut album, Russel Boring, was also released without the involvement of other members.

In May 2025, Abstract confirmed the group was unlikely to reunite, and claimed that the former members were not in regular contact. In June, he released his fifth studio album, Blush, featuring contributions from Vann, Hemnani, and Merley. The album, which also features a Houston-based collective of musicians and producers supporting Abstract, has been described as a spiritual successor to Brockhampton. In July 2026, Bearface, now known mononymously as Ciarán, announced his signing to Ninja Tune, and later that month released his first solo single in over ten years.

== Artistry ==
=== Musical style ===
Brockhampton was generally categorized as hip-hop, most consistently being placed in the alternative hip-hop sub-genre. The Saturation trilogy was noted for its sonic diversity, incorporating elements of pop rap, hardcore hip-hop, G-funk, and indie rock. Iridescence served as a diversification for the group, eschewing pop rap in favor of industrial hip-hop, experimental hip-hop, and progressive rap, inspired by UK rap and grime. Ginger, regarded as the band's most mellow project, is built around pop rap and alternative R&B, while Technical Difficulties Radio embraces West Coast hip-hop and was the group's first project to heavily utilize sampling. Roadrunner: New Light, New Machine continued the sampling trend, incorporating rap rock, contemporary R&B, and conscious hip-hop into their usual pop rap sound. The Family, aside from solely featuring lead vocals from Abstract, further departed from their usual sound as a sample-heavy chipmunk soul, southern hip-hop, and drumless hip-hop album, while TM, their final release, incorporates trap and dance-pop.

=== Members ===
The group's vocalists employed a variety of techniques and lyrical themes, with each member often being associated with a specific niche within the group, in a similar manner to a traditional boy band. Kevin Abstract, the group's de facto leader, oftentimes performed pop choruses, with his experiences with homophobia and fame underpinning his lyricism. On the Saturation trilogy, Ameer Vann was described as the most "grounded" and harsh member, performing in a gangsta rap style based in his upbringing in Houston, including experience with gang violence and racism. Matt Champion's verses centered around relationships, insecurities, and struggles with substance abuse. Dom McLennon employed a backpack rap style, with conscious verses that frequently addressed politics and racism. Merlyn Wood was characterized as the group's hype man, utilizing shouting to address relationships and his Ghanaian background. JOBA performed in a variety of styles, including ballads, screaming, and comedy rap reminiscent of Eminem. On the Saturation trilogy, Bearface appeared scarcely, returning at the end of each album to perform a guitar-driven ballad. Beginning with Iridescence (2018), he took on a more prominent role in the group, contributing vocals, rap verses, and production across multiple tracks. Producer Jabari Manwa became a performing member beginning with Technical Difficulties Radio, often being tasked with Auto-Tuned choruses on Roadrunner and TM.

=== Image ===
The group's image was mostly defined by their size, diversity, and resistance to traditional labeling. Pitchfork's Pete Tosiello cited the group as having a "Breakfast Club charm", owing to the group's inclusion of "black, white, gay, straight, African, Irish, and Latin members", as described by Michael Cragg of The Guardian. In a departure from traditional hip-hop groups such as Wu-Tang Clan and N.W.A, Brockhampton not only included rappers but also held singers, producers, photographers, graphic designers, managers, and even web developers within its ranks. The group's diverse lineup was described by Mikael Wood of the Los Angeles Times as a "Gen Z dream team".

Cara Smith of Flood Magazine credited the group with being more inviting of women and the queer community than traditional hip-hop groups, writing that "In lieu of racking up women and money like equally material possessions, Brockhampton opted to explore their psyches as outcasts, weirdos, addicts, mourners, dreamers, and tough guys who didn't always like their impulse to be tough guys." She gave special credit to Abstract, who at the period represented one of the few openly gay rappers to achieve popularity. The group received praise for the swift firing of Ameer Vann following allegations of sexual misconduct, which was seen as contrasting traditional attitudes towards masculinity and misogyny within hip-hop culture.

During the Saturation era in 2017, the group were noted for branding themselves as a boy band, as opposed to a hip-hop group. Semi-ironic epithets for the group included the "All-American boy band" and "the best boy band since One Direction". The group explained this decision as an attempt to redefine what made a boy band, as the group's diverse outsider roster contrasted with traditional boy bands, which consisted of straight, white, conventionally attractive singers who targeted an audience of young women. According to Vann, using the branding of a boy band allowed the group more freedom, as they believed pop music was perceived less stringently than hip-hop. Despite not matching the typical appearance of a boy band, the group adopted characteristics of one, including matching outfits during performances. By the release of Roadrunner: New Light, New Machine in 2021, the group began distancing themselves from the boy band label, citing their reluctance to write chart toppers and the lack of acceptance in hip-hop culture that came with their former image.

=== Legacy ===
Kevin McDermott of Firebird identified Brockhampton as the successors to "the title of the rap game's favorite oddball posse" once held by Odd Future. Several Brockhampton-inspired collectives and musicians can be seen as potential successors, including Teezo Touchdown, Kidz at Play, PartyOf2, 99 Neighbors, and Paris Texas, whose forms of alternative rap and pop can be traced to Brockhampton's genre-experimentation. Abstract's status as a popular openly-gay rapper was seen as influential on the acceptance other queer musicians such as Lil Nas X, while their usage of the internet to build a following has been replicated by Gen Z musicians on social media platforms such as TikTok.

== Band members ==
=== Final line-up ===
- Kevin Abstract – vocals, production, video direction, creative direction (2014–2022)
- Matt Champion – vocals (2014–2022), production (2022)
- Dom McLennon – vocals, production (2014–2022)
- Merlyn Wood – vocals (2014–2022)
- Joba – vocals, production, mixing engineering, mastering engineering, piano (2014–2022)
- Bearface – vocals, guitar, production (2014–2022)
- Jabari Manwa – production (2014–2022), vocals (2020–2022)
- Romil Hemnani – production, recording engineering, disc jockey (2014–2022)
- Kiko Merley – production (2014–2022)
- HK – creative direction, graphic design (2014–2022)
- Roberto Ontenient – production, web design, app development (2014−2022), skit vocals (2017, 2021)
- Jon Nunes – management (2014–2022)
- Ashlan Gray – photography, videography, webmaster (2016–2022)

=== Former members ===
- Ameer Vann – vocals (2014–2018)
- Rodney Tenor – vocals (2014–2016)
- Albert Gordon – production (2014–2016)
- Anish Ochani - Management (2014-2017)

== Discography ==
Studio albums

- Saturation (2017)
- Saturation II (2017)
- Saturation III (2017)
- Iridescence (2018)
- Ginger (2019)
- Roadrunner: New Light, New Machine (2021)
- The Family (2022)
- TM (2022)

== Filmography ==
Music videos are listed under the group's discography.

List of films or series with title, year released, and director
Year	Title	Director	Medium
2016	All-American Trash	Henock Sileshi	Documentary
2017	American Boyband	Shane Tilston	Documentary series
2017	Billy Star	Kevin Abstract	Short film
2017	Saturation	Henock Sileshi	Documentary
2018	The Longest Summer in America	Dude Heifetz	Documentary
2019	Keeping the Band	Kevin Abstract	Series
2021	Live from The Chapel	Kevin Abstract	Concert film

== Tours ==
=== Headlining tours ===
- Jennifer's Tour (2017)
- Love Your Parents Tour (2018)
- Stereo Spirit Tour (2018)
- I'll Be There Tour (2018)
- Heaven Belongs to You Tour (2019)
- Here Right Now Tour (2022) (Cancelled)

=== One-off concerts ===
- All-American Drive-In Prom (Los Angeles, 2016)
- Brockhampton Prom (Los Angeles, 2017)
- #iridescencelive (Auckland, 2018)
- Friday Therapy (Los Angeles, 2019)
- Live from The Chapel (Live-streamed, 2021)
- Brockhampton Ends at the Fonda (Los Angeles, 2022)

== Awards and nominations ==
Name of the award ceremony, year presented, recipient of the award, category and the result of the nomination
Award	Year	Nominee / work	Category	Result	Ref.
Brit Awards	2019	Brockhampton	International Group	Nominated	
GLAAD Media Awards	2019	Iridescence	Outstanding Music Artist	Nominated	
NME Awards	2020	Brockhampton	Best Band in the World	Nominated	
NME Awards	2020	"I Been Born Again"	Best Music Video	Nominated	
MTV Europe Music Awards	2020	Brockhampton	Best Push	Nominated	
GLAAD Media Awards	2022	Roadrunner: New Light, New Machine	Outstanding Music Artist	Nominated	
