= No Halo =

2019 single by Brockhampton

Single by Brockhampton

from the album Ginger
- Released: August 22, 2019
- Recorded: April 21 – July 31, 2019
- Genre: Alternative R&B; pop rap
- Length: 4:19
- Label: Question Everything; RCA
- Songwriters: Matthew Champion; William Wood; Ian Simpson; Dominique Simpson; Russell Boring; Ciarán McDonald; Ryan Beatty; Jabari Manwarring; Romil Hemnani
- Producers: Jabari Manwa; Hemnani

Brockhampton singles chronology
"Boy Bye" (2019)	"No Halo" (2019)	"Sugar" (2019)

Music video
- "No Halo" on YouTube

"No Halo" (stylized in all caps) is a song by American hip hop boy band Brockhampton, released on August 22, 2019 as the fourth single from their fifth studio album Ginger, which was released a day later. The song features vocals from Deb Never.

== Composition ==
The song has been described as mellow and having a "mopey, introspective vibe". It contains an acoustic guitar riff and drums in the instrumental, and performance through singing as much as rapping. The lyrics focus on depression, with different members addressing certain failures in their individual lives since rising to fame and topics such as failed relationships, substance abuse and religion. Deb Never sings the chorus along with Matt Champion and Merlyn Wood, repeating the words "I'm sure I'll find it".

== Music video ==
The music video was directed by Spencer Ford and released on August 21, 2019. Following a recurring surrealist theme, it sees Brockhampton in a darkened forest and roaming the streets. The video features silver jumpsuits which have been used in Brockhampton's other videos, Deb Never is seen with an owl. When the members ride in a car, the video blurs as if they are drunk. Each verse is performed in a varying scenario: Merlyn Wood appears on the stern of a yacht that is dangerously rocking in sea, Joba appears in an empty church illuminated in red, and Bearface sits within a silver cubby hole of similar material to his outfit.

== Live performances ==
Brockhampton performed the song on Jimmy Kimmel Live! on September 6, 2019.

== Charts ==
Chart (2019)	Peak position
Australia (ARIA)	65
Belgium (Ultratop 50 Flanders)	45
Ireland (IRMA)	50
New Zealand Hot Singles (RMNZ)	8
UK Singles (OCC)	76

== Certifications ==
Certifications for "No Halo"
Region	Certification	Certified units/sales
New Zealand (RMNZ)	Gold	15,000^{‡}
^{‡} Sales+streaming figures based on certification alone.
