= Heaven Belongs to You Tour =

2019 concert tour by Brockhampton

- Tour by Brockhampton
- Promotional poster for the tour
- Associated album: Ginger
- Start date: October 26, 2019
- End date: December 13, 2019
- Legs: 1
- No. of shows: 25

Brockhampton concert chronology
- I'll Be There Tour (2018); Heaven Belongs to You Tour (2019)

The Heaven Belongs to You Tour was the fifth and final headlining concert tour by American boy band/rap collective Brockhampton. The tour began on October 26, 2019, in Vancouver, and concluded on December 13, 2019, in Los Angeles.

== Background and development ==
On August 26, 2019, Brockhampton announced they would be embarking on their fifth headlining concert tour, in support of their fifth album, Ginger. Brockhampton was supported by experimental duo 100 gecs, and British rapper Slowthai.

== Tour dates ==
Date	City	Country	Venue	Opening act
North America
October 26, 2019	Vancouver	Canada	PNE Forum	100 gecs
October 27, 2019	Seattle	United States	WaMu Theater	100 gecs
October 30, 2019	Salt Lake City	United States	The Union Event Center	100 gecs
November 1, 2019	Phoenix	United States	The Van Buren	Slowthai; 100 gecs
November 3, 2019 (Note: The November 3, 2019 concert in Las Vegas was part of the Day N Vegas.)	Las Vegas	United States	Las Vegas Festival Grounds	Slowthai; 100 gecs
November 5, 2019	Fresno	United States	Rainbow Ballroom	Slowthai; 100 gecs
November 8, 2019	Palo Alto	United States	Frost Amphitheater	Slowthai; 100 gecs
November 9, 2019 (Note: The November 9, 2019 concert in Los Angeles was part of the Camp Flog Gnaw Carnival.)	Los Angeles	United States	Dodger Stadium	—N/a
November 13, 2019	San Antonio	United States	Aztec Theatre	Slowthai; 100 gecs
November 14, 2019	Dallas	United States	The Bomb Factory	Slowthai; 100 gecs
November 15, 2019	Austin	United States	ACL Live at The Moody Theater	Slowthai; 100 gecs
November 17, 2019	New Orleans	United States	The Fillmore New Orleans	Slowthai; 100 gecs
November 18, 2019	Miami	United States	The Fillmore Miami Beach	Slowthai; 100 gecs
November 20, 2019	Atlanta	United States	Coca-Cola Roxy	Slowthai; 100 gecs
November 22, 2019	New York City	United States	Hulu Theater	Slowthai; 100 gecs
November 24, 2019	Boston	United States	Agganis Arena	Slowthai; 100 gecs
November 25, 2019	Washington D.C.	United States	The Anthem	Slowthai; 100 gecs
November 27, 2019	Philadelphia	United States	The Fillmore Philadelphia	Slowthai; 100 gecs
November 29, 2019	Toronto	Canada	Coca-Cola Coliseum	Slowthai; 100 gecs
November 30, 2019	Detroit	United States	Masonic Temple	Slowthai; 100 gecs
December 1, 2019	Cleveland	United States	The Agora	Slowthai; 100 gecs
December 3, 2019	Minneapolis	United States	The Armory	Slowthai; 100 gecs
December 4, 2019	Milwaukee	United States	Eagles Club	Slowthai; 100 gecs
December 6, 2019	Chicago	United States	Aragon Ballroom	Slowthai; 100 gecs
December 9, 2019	Denver	United States	Mission Ballroom	Slowthai; 100 gecs
December 13, 2019 (Note: The December 13, 2019 concerts in Los Angeles includes a matinee and evening show.)	Los Angeles	United States	Hollywood Palladium	Slowthai; 100 gecs
