= I'll Be There Tour =

2018 concert tour by Brockhampton

- Tour by Brockhampton
- Promotional poster for the North American leg of the tour
- Associated album: Iridescence
- Start date: September 21, 2018
- End date: December 6, 2018
- Legs: 2
- No. of shows: 34

Brockhampton concert chronology
- Stereo Spirit Tour (2018); I'll Be There Tour (2018); Heaven Belongs to You Tour (2019)

The I'll Be There Tour was the fourth headlining concert tour by American rap collective Brockhampton, in support of their fourth studio album, Iridescence. The tour began on September 21, 2018, in Auckland, and concluded on December 6, 2018, in Las Vegas.

== Background and development ==
In June 2018, Brockhampton announced Australia and New Zealand tour dates in support of their fourth album, Iridescence. On August 30, 2018, they announced North American tour dates.

== Setlist ==
This setlist is representative of the show on September 25, 2018, in Melbourne. It does not represent all the shows from the tour.

1. "Weight"
2. "New Orleans"
3. "Zipper"
4. "Queer"
5. "Gummy"
6. "Star"
7. "Tonya"
8. "Gold"
9. "Where The Cash At"
10. "Sweet"
11. "Berlin"
12. "Honey"
13. "Bleach"
14. "J'Ouvert"
15. "District"
16. "San Marcos"
17. "Fabric"

Encore

1. "1998 Truman"
2. "1999 Wildfire"
3. "Boogie"

== Tour dates ==
| Date | City | Country | Venue |
Oceania
| September 21, 2018 | Auckland | New Zealand | Logan Campbell Centre |
| September 22, 2018 | Melbourne | Australia | Listen Out Melbourne |
| September 23, 2018 | Perth | Australia | Listen Out Perth |
| September 25, 2018 | Melbourne | Australia | Forum Theatre |
| September 26, 2018 | Sydney | Australia | Enmore Theatre |
| September 29, 2018 | Sydney | Australia | Listen Out Sydney |
| September 30, 2018 | Brisbane | Australia | Listen Out Brisbane |
North America
| October 23, 2018 | Mesa | United States | Mesa Amphitheatre |
| October 5, 2018 | Austin | United States | Austin City Limits Music Festival |
| October 6, 2018 | Austin | United States | Waller Creek Amphitheater |
| October 7, 2018 | Houston | United States | Revention Music Center |
| October 9, 2018 | Kansas City | United States | Midland Theatre |
| October 10, 2018 | Dallas | United States | South Side Ballroom |
| October 12, 2018 | Austin | United States | Austin City Limits Festival |
| October 13, 2018 | New Orleans | United States | Orpheum Theater |
| October 14, 2018 | Atlanta | United States | Coca-Cola Roxy |
| October 16, 2018 | Washington, D.C. | United States | The Anthem |
| October 17, 2018 | Philadelphia | United States | The Fillmore Philadelphia |
| October 20, 2018 | Boston | United States | Agganis Arena |
| October 21, 2018 | New York City | United States | Terminal 5 |
| October 22, 2018 | New York City | United States | Terminal 5 |
| October 25, 2018 | Toronto | Canada | Coca-Cola Coliseum |
| October 26, 2018 | Detroit | United States | The Masonic Temple |
| October 28, 2018 | Chicago | United States | Aragon Ballroom |
| October 30, 2018 | Minneapolis | United States | The Armory |
| November 1, 2018 | Denver | United States | Fillmore Auditorium |
| November 3, 2018 | Seattle | United States | WaMu Theater |
| November 5, 2018 | Vancouver | Canada | PNE Forum |
| November 7, 2018 | Boise | United States | Revolution Concert House |
| November 8, 2018 | San Francisco | United States | Bill Graham Civic Auditorium |
| November 10–11, 2018 | Los Angeles | United States | Camp Flog Gnaw Carnival |
| November 28, 2018 | Los Angeles | United States | Shrine Exposition Hall |
| December 1, 2018 | San Diego | United States | Valley View Casino |
| December 6, 2018 | Las Vegas | United States | The Chelsea at The Cosmopolitan of Las Vegas |
