= Ginger (Brockhampton album) =

Studio album by Brockhampton
- Released: August 23, 2019
- Recorded: April 21 – July 31, 2019
- Studios: The BH Factory (Los Angeles); Chateau Marmont (Los Angeles); Shangri-La (Malibu, California); Sea Tea Soundwerks (New York City)
- Genres: Alternative R&B; pop rap; alternative hip hop
- Length: 44:16
- Labels: Question Everything; RCA
- Producers: Brockhampton: Kevin Abstract; Jabari Manwa; Romil Hemnani; Kiko Merley

Brockhampton chronology
| Iridescence (2018) | Ginger (2019) | Technical Difficulties Radio (2020) |

Singles from Ginger
- 1. "I Been Born Again" Released: July 31, 2019; 2. "If You Pray Right" Released: August 7, 2019; 3. "Boy Bye" Released: August 15, 2019; 4. "No Halo" Released: August 21, 2019; 5. "Sugar" Released: November 19, 2019

Ginger is the fifth studio album by American hip hop group Brockhampton. It was released on August 23, 2019, through the band's label Question Everything and RCA. The album contains uncredited guest appearances from Deb Never, Ryan Beatty, Slowthai, and Victor Roberts II.

== Background ==
On April 21, 2019, Kevin Abstract tweeted that he started the making of a new Brockhampton album. In a Beats 1 interview with Zane Lowe, Kevin revealed that he could not finish his solo album, Arizona Baby, due to a lack of creativity and needed to work on something else, which marked the beginning of Ginger. In the same interview, producer Jabari Manwa said that he and fellow members Romil Hemnani and Kiko Merley made around 100 songs during the making of Ginger.

In an interview with GQ in June, Kevin Abstract compared the sound of the album to Outkast's "Hey Ya!", and said the group's approach was taking lyrics about topics like anxiety and depression "and putting it on a song that a bunch of people could dance to". On June 20, thirty seconds of a new song from the album titled "Sugar" was found on the app TikTok. Some fans also found that the song could be played in digital jukeboxes in some local bars. The full song was leaked online the next day.

During a September 2019 GQ episode of "Actually Me", the band stated that Ginger was their personal favorite out of their projects.

== Promotion ==
On July 1, 2019, Brockhampton revealed the album title in a video posted to their social media. The video consisted of a shot of member Matt Champion tying his shoelaces while a snippet of "Love Me for Life" played in the background. The group performed "Boy Bye" in Spain on their summer festival tour. The group announced that the album would be released in August 2019 in a clip of flashing images of the vocalists, with a snippet of "St. Percy", posted to social media on July 18. Ginger merchandise was available on their website starting on July 23.

The band released the first single, "I Been Born Again", a song featuring all vocalists, on July 31, 2019. The music video is black-and-white with a fisheye lens rolling on the ground and the members performing. The band went on Beats 1 with Zane Lowe on August 1 to talk about Ginger and the development of the group, where it was announced that the album would contain 12 tracks. On Kevin Abstract's Instagram Live, various snippets were shown days before the release of Ginger.

The second single, "If You Pray Right", was released on August 7, 2019, and has two parts. The music video featured the members playing instruments in space suits on a field and a snippet from another track, titled "Hood Still Love Me".

"Boy Bye" was added to the International Standard Recording Code database on August 6, 2019 and was released as a single on August 14, 2019. It's one of the rare occasions in Brockhampton where all current producers and vocalists are on a song together. In an interview with Ryan Seacrest on August 12, the date for Ginger's release was revealed to be August 23, 2019.

The fourth single, "No Halo", was released on August 21, 2019, and features vocals from Deb Never and Ryan Beatty. The band held their own "Ginger Radio" on Beats 1 from August 22 to 24. On the release date of Ginger, they had a free live show called "Friday Therapy" at Fonda Theatre where they performed the full album. Guest artists that came and performed included JPEGMafia, Dominic Fike, 100 gecs.

Videos for "Heaven Belongs to You" and "Dearly Departed" were released on August 26 and 29, respectively. The former was released in tandem with the announcement of their Heaven Belongs to You Tour with special guest Slowthai, who also appears in the video. On August 28 and 30, they had interviews for Genius and Power 106 LA.

== Critical reception ==
Professional ratings
Aggregate scores
| Source | Rating |
|---|---|
| AnyDecentMusic? | 6.5/10 |
| Metacritic | 75/100 |
Review scores
| Source | Rating |
| AllMusic | 4/5 stars |
| Clash | 6/10 |
| Consequence of Sound | B |
| DIY | 4.5/5 stars |
| HipHopDX | 3.2/5 |
| The Line of Best Fit | 8.5/10 |
| NME | 4/5 stars |
| Pitchfork | 6.5/10 |
| Rolling Stone | 2.5/5 stars |
| Variety | 4/5 stars |

Ginger was met with generally favorable reviews. At Metacritic, which assigns a normalized rating out of 100 to reviews from mainstream publications, the album received an average score of 75, based on 12 reviews. The aggregator AnyDecentMusic? gave the album a weighted average score of 6.5 out of 10, based on 7 reviews.

Amongst the more favourable reviews, AllMusic's Neil Z. Yeung described the album "As their most compact effort to date, Ginger wastes little time, delivering a fully immersive and inventive genre-blurring experience akin to contemporary-era releases by Tyler, the Creator and Frank Ocean." In a review for DIY, Elly Watson called the album the band's "most mature and concise work to date," which "deliver some of their most raw and unfiltered verses so far." Sophie Walker reviewed the album for The Line of Best Fit, where she claimed that "Ginger yields a sound that is more emotionally evolved than any album thus far. Where The Saturation Trilogy was raw youthfulness and Iridescence was loaded with erratic expression, Ginger is, at last, the coherence we have been searching for. Here is a band who have had the chance to breathe, to live, to process – the result is Brockhampton have finally come of age."

David Skipworth was also receptive in an appraisal for The New Zealand Herald, stating it "showcases the myriad directions in which the group could go and ultimately reassures fans that Brockhampton are here to stay." Reviewing the album for NME, Will Richards wrote "Brockhampton push themselves forward gently in musical terms... [The album] is the sound of the lyrical weight of ‘Iridescence’ being forcibly lifted off the band, with auto-tuned melodies floating around a catchy, snappy beat. It's utter bliss." In the review for Variety, Brandom Yu declared that "With 'Ginger,' their fifth record in just over two years, they’ve presented their tightest and potentially most memorable album yet. Across twelve tracks, the rap collective is noticeably more controlled and concise."

Some reviewers were more lukewarm in their reception to the album. In the review for Clash, Debbie Ijaduola called the album "new ground for Brockhampton, and a gentle nudge to others, urging them to go on their own paths of rediscovery and explore their roots. Thing is, we might need a bit more than a gentle nudge." HipHopDX reviewer Daniel Spielberger wrote, "Iridescence proved that the group could survive Vann’s abrupt departure, Ginger exposes their creative limitations." Reviewing the album for Pitchfork, Sheldon Pearce concluded that "There is little here that suggests holism. They like to call themselves a boy band, but boy bands are, at the very least, in sync." Christopher R. Weingarten was also critical in a review for Rolling Stone where he felt that the band "rarely take these topics [mental health, relationships, addiction, and their faith in God] too far past surface level brushes, resulting in a lot of talking sad and saying nothing."

== Commercial performance ==
Ginger debuted at number three on the US Billboard 200 dated September 7, 2019, with 77,000 album-equivalent units (including 55,000 pure album sales). Ginger fell to No. 61 in the next week's Billboard 200 chart and was not in the Billboard 200 chart dating to October 5, 2019. The fifth single "Sugar" peaked at No. 66 in the Billboard Hot 100 chart dated March 21, 2020 – 7 months after the song's release. It was the first song by Brockhampton to appear on the chart, and became the group's first platinum record on April 29, 2020.

== Track listing ==
Adapted from official website. All track titles are stylized in all caps.

Ginger track listing
| No. | Title | Writer(s) | Producer(s) | Length |
|---|---|---|---|---|
| 1. | "No Halo" | Matthew Champion; William Wood; Ian Simpson; Dominique Simpson; Russell Boring; Ciarán McDonald; Ryan Beatty; Jabari Manwarring; Romil Hemnani | Jabari Manwa; Hemnani^{[a]} | 4:19 |
| 2. | "Sugar" | Champion; McDonald; D. Simpson; I. Simpson; Beatty; Manwarring; Hemnani; Chuks Chiejine | Manwa; Hemnani; Chiejine^{[a]} | 3:24 |
| 3. | "Boy Bye" | Boring; Champion; McDonald; D. Simpson; I. Simpson; Wood; Hemnani; Manwarring; Isaiah Merriweather; Reza Attaei; Varoujan | Manwa; Hemnani; Kiko Merley | 2:22 |
| 4. | "Heaven Belongs to You" | Tyron Frampton; Hemnani; Manwarring; Paul D. Beauregard; Jordan Houston; Patrick Earl Houston | Manwa; Hemnani | 1:29 |
| 5. | "St. Percy" | I. Simpson; Champion; D. Simpson; McDonald; Wood; Manwarring; Hemnani; "D-Flexx" Knighton; Christopher Jerrod Dooley, Jr. | Manwa; Hemnani | 3:30 |
| 6. | "If You Pray Right" | D. Simpson; I. Simpson; Champion; Wood; Boring; Hemnani; Manwarring; Otis G. Johnson; Beauregard; J. Houston; P. Houston | Hemnani; Manwa | 5:02 |
| 7. | "Dearly Departed" | I. Simpson; Boring; Champion; D. Simpson; Hemnani; Merriweather; Jimmy Cardell | Hemnani; Merley | 4:40 |
| 8. | "I Been Born Again" | McDonald; I. Simpson; Wood; D. Simpson; Boring; Henock Sileshi; Champion; Manwarring; Hemnani | Manwa; Hemnani | 3:39 |
| 9. | "Ginger" | I. Simpson; Champion; McDonald; D. Simpson; Beatty; Hemnani; Manwarring | Manwa; Hemnani | 3:54 |
| 10. | "Big Boy" | I. Simpson; Boring; McDonald; Champion; Hemnani; Manwarring | Hemnani; Manwa | 3:55 |
| 11. | "Love Me for Life" | I. Simpson; Boring; Wood; McDonald; Parker Mulherin; Hemnani; Joseph Wayne McVey; Leroy Williams, Jr.; Patrick Hawkins; Robert Earl Davis, Jr.; Michael Dixon | Manwa; Hemnani | 3:35 |
| 12. | "Victor Roberts" | I. Simpson; McDonald; Victor Roberts II; Beatty; Hemnani; Manwarring | Hemnani; Manwa^{[a]} | 4:23 |
| Total length: | | | | 44:16 |

Notes

- ^{^[a]} signifies an additional producer

Samples

- "Boy Bye" contains a sample from "Ejazeh", written by Reza Attaei and Varoujan, as performed by Dariush.
- "Heaven Belongs to You" contains samples and excerpts from "Break da Law", written by Paul D. Beauregard, Jordan Houston and Patrick Earl Houston, as performed by Project Pat.
- "St. Percy" contains excerpts of "Only God Knows (GFunk)", written and performed by D-Flexx; and contains excerpts from and a sample of "The Ratchet City Movement EPK", written and performed by Hurricane Chris.
- "If You Pray Right" contains a sample of the recording "Walk with Jesus", written and performed by Otis G. Johnson; and contains samples and excerpts from "Break da Law".
- "Dearly Departed" contains excerpts from "Barefoot", written by Jimmy Cardell, as performed by Chicago Hartley and Jimmy Ledrac.
- "Love Me for Life" contains samples from "From the South" written by Joseph Wayne McVey, Leroy Williams Jr., Patrick Hawkins, Robert Earl Davis Jr. and Michael Dixon, and performed by Z-Ro.

== Personnel ==
Adapted from official website.

Additional vocals

- Deb Never – vocals (track 1)
- Ryan Beatty – vocals (track 2, 12), background vocals (track 9)
- Slowthai – vocals (track 4)
- Parker Mulherin – vocals (track 11)
- Victor Roberts II – vocals (track 12)

Instrumentation

- Chuks Chiejine – guitar (tracks 1, 2), additional programming (track 3)
- Ciarán McDonald – guitar (track 7)
- Dom McLennon – additional programming (track 8)
- Joba – piano (track 8), trombone (track 6)

Technical

- Romil Hemnani – recording
- Jabari Manwa – recording (tracks 2, 3, 5, 6, 8)
- Ian French – recording (track 6)
- Tom Elmhirst – mixing
- Brandon Bost – mixing engineering
- Matthew Scatchell – mixing assistance
- Vlado Meller – mastering

Artwork

- Henock Sileshi – creative direction, photography, album cover direction
- Kevin Abstract – creative direction, album cover direction
- Ashlan Grey – photography
- Adrian Nieto – photography, album cover direction
- Robert Ontenient – photography, album cover direction

== Charts ==
Chart performance for Ginger
| Chart (2019) | Peak position |
|---|---|
| Australian Albums (ARIA) | 3 |
| Austrian Albums (Ö3 Austria) | 67 |
| Belgian Albums (Ultratop Flanders) | 20 |
| Canadian Albums (Billboard) | 10 |
| Danish Albums (Hitlisten) | 16 |
| Dutch Albums (Album Top 100) | 17 |
| Finnish Albums (Suomen virallinen lista) | 17 |
| Irish Albums (IRMA) | 6 |
| Lithuanian Albums (AGATA) | 4 |
| New Zealand Albums (RMNZ) | 3 |
| Norwegian Albums (VG-lista) | 10 |
| Swedish Albums (Sverigetopplistan) | 30 |
| UK Albums (Official Charts) | 11 |
| US Billboard 200 | 3 |

== Certifications ==
Certifications for "Ginger"
| Region | Certification | Certified units/sales |
|---|---|---|
| New Zealand (RMNZ) | Platinum | 15,000^{‡} |
^{‡} Sales+streaming figures based on certification alone.
