= Boogie (song) =

2017 single by Brockhampton

"BOOGIE"

Single by Brockhampton

from the album Saturation III
- Released: December 12, 2017
- Recorded: August–November 2017
- Genre: Alternative hip hop
- Length: 3:13
- Label: Question Everything; Empire
- Songwriters: Ian Simpson; Ameer Vann; Matthew Champion; Russell Boring; William Wood; Dominique Simpson
- Producers: Romil Hemnani; Jabari Manwa

Brockhampton singles chronology
"Sweet" (2017)	"BOOGIE" (2017)	"Stains" (2017)

Music video
- "Boogie" on YouTube

"Boogie" (stylized in all caps) is a song by American hip hop boy band Brockhampton, released on December 12, 2017, as the lead single from their third studio album Saturation III (2017).

== Composition and lyrics ==
The production of the song consists of saxophone and sirens, the style of which has been compared to that of N.E.R.D., providing a mood of high energy. Lyrically, Brockhampton members describe the hardships they have faced; Kevin Abstract proclaims in the chorus, "I've been beat up my whole life / I've been shot down, kicked down twice / Ain't no stoppin' me tonight / I'ma get all the things I like".

== Critical reception ==
Will Rosebury of Clash praised the instrumental, writing "the multitude of horn and sirens providing the perfect canvas for some of the group's most unhinged verses." Dan Weiss of Consequence of Sound described the song as an "SNL Band-meets-House of Pain squall" and a "conscious attempt to make something more danceable".

Variety placed "Boogie" at number eight on their list of Brockhampton's 15 best songs.

== Music video ==
The music video was directed by Kevin Abstract and released alongside the single. It finds Brockhampton wreaking havoc at a convenience store in Van Nuys, Los Angeles, where each of them performs their verses in different areas; Abstract is in the aisles and Joba is in the freezer. At one point, the group is dressed in orange jumpsuits with their skin painted blue. They later rob a pizzeria.

== Charts ==
Chart (2017)	Peak position
New Zealand Heatseekers (RMNZ)	4

== Certifications ==
Certifications for Boogie
Region	Certification	Certified units/sales
New Zealand (RMNZ)	Gold	15,000^{‡}
^{‡} Sales+streaming figures based on certification alone.
