= 1999 Wildfire =

2018 single by Brockhampton

Single by Brockhampton
- Released: July 7, 2018
- Length: 4:11
- Label: Question Everything; RCA
- Songwriters: Phalon Alexander; Ian Simpson; Matthew Champion; Russell Boring; Dominique Simpson; Ciarán McDonald; Isaiah Merriweather; Romil Hemnani
- Producers: Kiko Merley; Hemnani; Kevin Abstract; Joba; Bearface; Jabari Manwa

Brockhampton singles chronology
"Zipper" (2017)	"1999 Wildfire" (2018)	"1998 Truman" (2018)

Music video
- "1999 Wildfire" on YouTube

"1999 Wildfire" (stylized in all caps) is a single by American hip hop boy band Brockhampton, released on July 7, 2018. It features additional vocals from American producer Jazze Pha.

== Background ==
"1999 Wildfire" was originally created during the sessions for Brockhampton's planned fourth studio album Puppy. At the time, the track was set to be the second song on the album, and originally went by the name "Big Fat Liar". Leaked demo versions of the track showed a pitched-up verse from then-member Ameer Vann, a full verse and additional backing vocals from Jazze Pha, and alternate vocal takes on Dom McLennon and Matt Champion's verses. After Puppy was scrapped due to the removal of Vann, the song was then likely slated to be released as a part of a new album titled "The Best Years Of Our Lives"; this album was also eventually scrapped. The song premiered on Brockhampton's Beats 1 radio show Things We Lost in the Fire Radio, in the first episode. It was followed by a video shortly after. When Brockhampton's fourth studio album, Iridescence, did finally release in September 2018, the track did not make the final cut of the album.

== Composition ==
"1999 Wildfire" begins with an introduction from Jazze Pha and contains a flute-laced instrumental, over which Brockhampton members perform in rapid-fire rhymes. Kevin Abstract sings the hook of the song. Joba's verse finds him recounting Brockhampton's road to success as a fantasy story. During the bridge (sung by Bearface), the song transitions to a style similar to late 1990s/early 2000s R&B.

== Critical reception ==
The song was well-received by music critics. Allison Shoemaker of Consequence of Sound described it as a "buoyant track that pairs a catchy as hell hook with smart, incisive lyrics." Eric Skelton of Complex wrote of the song, "Mixing catchy melodies and smart, innovative raps, this one should go over well for any fans of the Saturation trilogy—but it also has the noticeable feeling of being the beginning of a new chapter for the group." Sheldon Pearce of Pitchfork commented the song "maximizes its members' talents and continues to reinforce their teamwork" and "evokes the warmth of nostalgia".

Variety placed "1999 Wildfire" at number 11 in their ranking of Brockhampton's 15 best songs.

== Music video ==
The music video was directed by Kevin Abstract and filmed in Quebec City. It features close-ups of each member performing their verse, as well as "dramatically-lit" shots taken in a parking lot.

== Certifications ==
Certifications and sales for "1999 Wildfire"
Region	Certification	Certified units/sales
New Zealand (RMNZ)	Gold	15,000^{‡}
United States (RIAA)	Gold	500,000^{‡}
^{‡} Sales+streaming figures based on certification alone.
