= The Family (Brockhampton album) =

Studio album by Brockhampton
- Released: November 17, 2022
- Length: 35:24
- Label: RCA; Question Everything
- Producer: Bearface; Boylife; Nick Velez

Brockhampton chronology
Roadrunner: New Light, New Machine (2021)	The Family (2022)	TM (2022)

Singles from The Family
- 1. "Big Pussy" Released: November 4, 2022; 2. "The Ending" Released: November 11, 2022

Professional ratings
Aggregate scores
Source	Rating
AnyDecentMusic?	7.4/10
Metacritic	79/100
Review scores
Source	Rating
AllMusic	3.5/5 stars
Clash	9/10
The Daily Telegraph	4/5 stars
DIY	3.5/5 stars
The Line of Best Fit	8/10
NME	4/5 stars
Pitchfork	7.2/10
Rolling Stone	4/5 stars
Slant Magazine	3/5 stars

The Family is the seventh studio album by American hip hop boy band Brockhampton. It was released on November 17, 2022, through RCA and Question Everything. The release of a final album during 2022 was announced during the band's performance at the 2022 Coachella festival. The Family was thought to be Brockhampton's final studio album, and was advertised as such, until the announcement of a subsequent album, TM, in a promo image released alongside The Family.

Although credited to the thirteen-man group as a whole, only three members of Brockhampton contributed to the project: Kevin Abstract is the lead performer across the whole album, Bearface serves as an executive producer and additional vocalist, and Romil Hemnani co-wrote several tracks. The album was primarily produced by Bearface along with external collaborators Boylife and Nick Velez, with the former credited as an executive producer. The Family is the first Brockhampton album not executive produced by Abstract, and the only Brockhampton album to be executive-produced by a non-member.

== Background ==
In January 2022, Brockhampton announced their disbandment via social media, which was to follow their scheduled performances at O_{2} Academy Brixton and Coachella. During their performance at Coachella on April 16, 2022, they announced a then unnamed final album, to be released in the same year. Two days later, the video projected during the performance would be released to their YouTube page, titled "Message from Brockhampton".

== Promotion ==
In October 2022, Brockhampton created a private Instagram user named @imissthebandalready. An image of the unfollowed state of this page would be reposted on the band's official Instagram page's story in the latter half of October.

On October 27, 2022, Brockhampton posted a one-minute video titled "I Miss the Band Already" to their YouTube and Instagram pages, teasing a final album announcement. In the comments of the Instagram video, Kevin Abstract stated that there would be a follow-up in "one hour..." As such, an hour later, an album teaser for The Family was released to their YouTube and Instagram pages, announcing a release date of November 17, 2022, and the album cover was posted to their various social media accounts.

On November 4, 2022, "Big Pussy" was released as the first single from The Family. On November 11, "The Ending" was released as the second single from the album.

On November 16, 2022, Brockhampton posted a final teaser for the album titled "It All Comes Out In The Wash" to their YouTube and Instagram pages. One day later, on November 17, 2022, the album released alongside a music video for "RZA."

== Track listing ==
The Family track listing
No.	Title	Writer(s)	Producer(s)	Length
1.	"Take It Back"	Ian Simpson; Romil Hemnani; Nick Velez; Ciarán McDonald; Raymond A. Myles	Nick Velez	2:17
2.	"RZA"	Simpson; Hemnani; McDonald; Bruce Belland; Glen Larson	Bearface	2:12
3.	"Gold Teeth"	Simpson; Hemnani; McDonald	Bearface	1:46
4.	"Big Pussy"	Simpson; McDonald; Velez; Bobby Pyn; Smoothe Da Hustler; DR Period; Mario Candido Rusca; Pat Smear; William A. Keyes	Bearface; Velez	2:20
5.	"All That"	Simpson; Hemnani; McDonald; Lisa Lopes; Arnold Hennings	Bearface	2:46
6.	"(Back From The) Road"	Simpson; Ryan Yoo	boylife	1:34
7.	"Basement"	Simpson; Yoo	boylife	1:13
8.	"Southside"	Simpson; Yoo; Ammasu Akapoma Group	boylife	1:21
9.	"Good Time"	Simpson; Yoo; Thomas Lee Barett	boylife	1:51
10.	"37th"	Simpson; McDonald; Chips Moman; Dan Penn	Bearface	2:15
11.	"Boyband"	Simpson; McDonald; Yoo; John W. Hason	boylife	1:44
12.	"Any Way You Want Me"	Simpson; Yoo	boylife	1:31
13.	"The Family"	Simpson; Hemnani; McDonald; Velez; Yoo; Donald Breedlove; Napoleon Crayton; Al Dubin; Harry Warren	Velez	2:55
14.	"Prayer"	Simpson; Yoo	boylife	1:45
15.	"My American Life"	Simpson; Yoo; McDonald	boylife, Bearface	1:27
16.	"The Ending"	Simpson; Yoo; Willie Hutch	boylife	1:48
17.	"Brockhampton"	Simpson; Hemnani; McDonald; Betty Thompson; Jerry Middleton; Marvin Thompson; Stanley Shulman; David Thompson	boylife, Bearface	4:32
Total length:				35:17

=== Samples ===
- "Take It Back" contains excerpts from "Miracle", written by Raymond A. Myles.
- "RZA" contains excerpts from "The Big Draft", written by Bruce Belland and Glen Larson.
- "Big Pussy" contains excerpts from "Victim", performed by The Germs, "Bluan", written by Mario Candido Rusca, "Love Is the Reason", written by William A. Keyes and samples from "Hustlin", performed by Smoothe Da Hustler.
- "All That" contains interpolation from "All That", written by Lisa Lopes and Arnold Hennings.
- "Southside" contains excerpts from "You Are So Brave (Funeral Dirge)".
- "Good Time" contains a sample of the recording "Jesus Is the World to Me", performed by Pastor T.L. Barrett and the Youth For Christ Choir.
- "37th" contains excerpts from "The Dark End of the Street", written by Chips Moman and Dan Penn.
- "Boyband" contains excerpts from "In God's Own Time (My Change Will Come)", written by John W. Hason.
- "The Family" contains excerpts from "New Day", written by Donald Breedlove and Napoleon Crayton, "September in the Rain", written by Al Dubin and Harry Warren, and samples from "New Day" by Band Of Thieves.
- "The Ending" contains excerpts from "Let Me Be the One Baby", performed by Willie Hutch.
- "Brockhampton" contains excerpts from "I Can't Fake It Anymore", performed by Ruby Winters.

== Personnel ==
Production and arrangement

- Bearface – production (2–5, 10, 15, 17), additional production (1), executive production
- Boylife – production (6–9, 11–12, 14–17), additional production (1, 13), executive production
- Nick Velez – production (1, 4, 13), additional production (2–3, 14)

Musicians

- Kevin Abstract – lead vocals
- Bearface – additional vocals (13, 15), background vocals (11)
- Boylife – additional vocals (1, 6, 13, 16)
- RZA – additional vocals (2, 11)
- Caitlyn Harris – additional vocals (2, 5)
- No Rome – additional vocals (5)
- Vanessa "Nettie" Wood – additional vocals (9)
- Erik Shiboski – upright bass (4)
- "Robot" Scott Carter – piano (13), programming (13)

Technical personnel

- Bearface – recording (1–5, 10, 17)
- Boylife – recording (6–9, 11–16)
- Bob Power – mixing
- Honey Canin – mixing assistant
- Heba Kadry – mastering

Design

- No Tricks – art direction, design
- Chris Albo – art direction, design
- Zhoutong Lesley Qi – art direction, design
- Amanda Alborano – art direction, design

== Charts ==
Chart performance for The Family
Chart (2022)	Peak position
Australian Albums (ARIA)	90
Scottish Albums (OCC)	49
UK Albums (OCC)	98
UK R&B Albums (OCC)	3
US Billboard 200	15
US Top R&B/Hip-Hop Albums (Billboard)	7
