= TM (album) =

Studio album by Brockhampton

Studio album by Brockhampton
- Released: November 18, 2022
- Recorded: Early 2020–August 2021
- Length: 37:30
- Labels: Question Everything; RCA
- Producers: Matt Champion; Kiko Merley; Joba; Jonah Abraham; Romil Hemnani; Bradford Lewis; Jabari Manwa; Baird; William Van Zandt; Goldwash; Alex Goose; Dom McLennon; Dutra; Grant Lapointe; Merlyn Wood; Solomonophonic; John DeBold; Coop the Truth; Dylan Neustadter; The Kount; Wesley Allen

Brockhampton chronology
The Family (2022)	TM (2022)

TM is the eighth and final studio album by American hip hop boy band Brockhampton. It was released on November 18, 2022, one day after the release of the group's previous studio album The Family, through RCA and Question Everything. For its entire rollout, The Family was advertised as the band's final album. A surprise release, TM was announced for release alongside a promo image for The Family, and was billed by the band as a "parting gift for fans".

In contrast to The Family, which solely featured Kevin Abstract as a performer with production from Bearface, TM sees the group's full roster return. Abstract, Matt Champion, Dom McLennon, Jabari Manwa, Merlyn Wood, and Joba return as performers, with group members Romil Hemnani, Kiko Merley, and Manwa producing the bulk of the album alongside several outside producers. Despite executive producing The Family, performer and producer Bearface is entirely absent from TM. TM was executive produced by Matt Champion, marking his first production credit on a Brockhampton project. The album contains uncredited guest appearances from the group's frequent collaborator Ryan Beatty.

== Background ==
The Family had been advertised as the final studio album from Brockhampton. Despite this, in a promo image posted to social media alongside the release of The Family, the band announced surprise album TM in small text towards the bottom of the image, reading "Surprise album (TM) midnight local." TM completed the 6-album deal that the group signed with RCA Records in 2018.

== Recording ==
Stated in a press release, TM is "an album made up of songs that were started by the group during a two-week stint in Ojai, California in 2021, but were never fully completed during those sessions." The album is executively produced by Brockhampton member Matt Champion.

"Keep It Southern" and "Man on the Moon" were previously teased as part of the band's Technical Difficulties Radio livestreams in 2020.

== Critical reception ==
Professional ratings
Review scores
Source	Rating
AllMusic	4/5 stars
Clash	9/10
Evening Standard	4/5 stars

Clash journalist James Mellen called TM "a classic Brockhampton record" that successfully ended the Brockhampton project, featuring "immaculate production, genre shapeshifting, and some of the cleanest verses from the group in quite some time".

== Track listing ==
TM track listing
No.	Title	Writer(s)	Producer(s)	Length
1.	"FMG"	Ian Simpson; Dominique Simpson; Matthew Champion; Kiko Merley; Russell Boring; Jonah Abraham	Kiko Merley; Russell Boring; Jonah Abraham; Matthew Champion^{[b]}	2:30
2.	"Animal"	I. Simpson; Abraham; Champion; Ryan Beatty; Jabari Manwa; Romil Hemnani; Baird Acheson; William Van Zandt; Goldwash; Bradford Lewis	Romil Hemnani; Bradford Lewis; Jabari Manwa; Baird; William Van Zandt; Goldwash	4:22
3.	"Listerine"	Champion; D. Simpson; Manwa; I. Simpson; Alex Goose; Homer Steinweiss; Merley; Leon Michels; Shannon Wise; Solomon Newman Whyte	Hemnani; Merley; Abraham; Alex Goose; Dominique Simpson; Manwa^{[a]}; Jared Solomon^{[a]}	3:06
4.	"New Shoes"	I. Simpson; Manwa; Johnny Dutra; Abraham; Champion; Hemnani; Murda Beatz; William Wood	Hemnani; Abraham; Manwa; Dutra	3:18
5.	"Keep It Southern"	I. Simpson; Merley; Hemnani; Abraham; Grant Lapointe; William Wood	Hemnani; Abraham; Merley; Grant Lapointe; William Wood	1:57
6.	"Man on the Moon"	I. Simpson; Champion; Lapointe; Boring; Beatty; Simon Newsome; Hemnani; Merley; Abraham; Jared P. Solomon; John DeBold	Merley; Hemnani; Jared Solomon; Abraham; John DeBold	4:00
7.	"Better Things"	Champion; Merley; Boring; I. Simpson; Acheson	Champion; Merley; Baird	2:53
8.	"Crucify Me"	Boring; Lapointe; Merley; Champion; I. Simpson; Abraham; Jordon Lumley; Cooper McGill; Teddi Jones; Karim Hutton	Abraham; Merley; Coop The Truth; Jordan Lumley^{[a]}	4:22
9.	"Duct Tape"	Champion; Abraham; Boring; I. Simpson; Acheson; Hemnani; Dylan Neustadter; Manwa; D. Simpson; Wesley Allen; Koal Harrison; Rex Kudo	Hemnani; D. Simpson; Manwa; Dylan Neustadter; Baird; The Kount; Wesley Allen	4:44
10.	"Always Something"	I. Simpson; D. Simpson; Sean Matsukawa; Boring; Manwa	Manwa	3:29
11.	"Goodbye"	Champion; Boring; Hemnani; Manwa; Abraham; William Garvey	Hemnani; Manwa; Abraham	2:49
Total length:				37:30

=== Samples ===
- ^{^[a]} signifies an additional producer
- ^{^[b]} signifies an additional drum programmer
- All tracks are stylized in all caps. For example, "Animal" is stylized as "ANIMAL".
- "Listerine" contains excerpts from "Sha Na Na" as performed by El Michels Affair, written by Homer Steinweiss, Leon Michels, and Shannon Wise.
- "Keep It Southern" contains a sample from "Yesu Mahesha", by P. Susheela.
- "Goodbye" contains excerpts from "Goodbye Horses" as performed by Q Lazzarus, written by William Garvey.

== Personnel ==
Brockhampton

- Matt Champion – vocals (1–4, 6–9, 11), production (7), additional drum programming (1), art direction, executive production
- Kevin Abstract – vocals (1–10)
- Jabari Manwa – vocals (2–4, 9), production (2, 4, 9–11), additional production (3)
- Dom McLennon – vocals (1, 3–4, 10), production (3, 9)
- Joba – vocals (6–11), production (1)
- Merlyn Wood – vocals (4–5), production (5)
- Bearface (credit only)
- Romil Hemnani – production (2–6, 9, 11), recording (1–7, 9–11)
- Kiko Merley – production (1, 3, 5–8), arrangement (7)
- Henock "HK" Sileshi – art direction, graphic design
- Ashlan Grey – photography

Additional musicians

- Ryan Beatty – vocals (2, 6)
- August Royals – additional vocals (6)
- Rich Hinman – slide guitar (7)
- Jay Rudolph – drums (8)
- Sean Matsukawa – guitar (10)
- Brad Lewis – production (2)
- Baird – production (2, 7, 9)
- WilliamVanZandt– production (2)
- Goldwash – production (2)
- Jonah Abraham – production (3, 5–6, 8, 11), synth bass (2, 9)
- Alex Goose – production (3)
- Dutra – production (4)
- Grant Lapointe – production (5), synth (1), keys (6, 8)
- Solomonophonic – production (6), additional production (3)
- John Debold – production (6)
- Coop the Truth – production (8)
- Dylan Neustadter – production (9)
- The Kount – production (9)
- Wesley Allen – production (9)
- Jordon Lumley – additional production (8)

Technical personnel

- Alex Thompson – recording engineer (1)
- Eddie Roberts – recording engineer (1)
- Garry Purohit – recording engineer (1–4, 7, 9, 11)
- Jeremy Simoneaux – recording engineer (8)
- Alex Tumay – mixing
- Andrew Kim – mixing assistant
- Nacor Zuluaga – mixing assistant
- Joe LaPorta – mastering

== Charts ==
Chart performance for TM
Chart (2022)	Peak position
US Billboard 200	100
US Top R&B/Hip-Hop Albums (Billboard)	43
