= Roadrunner: New Light, New Machine =

- Standard album cover; CDs with individual members on different covers were released via Brockhampton's website

Studio album by Brockhampton
- Released: April 9, 2021
- Recorded: 2018–2021
- Studios: Kaufman (Los Angeles); Blue Coyote (Hidden Hills & Corpus Christi); Dom McLennon's home (Los Angeles); Studios 301 (Alexandria NSW); Paramount (Hollywood); CDUB (Walnut Acres); Westlake (Los Angeles); Beverly Hills Hotel (Beverly Hills)
- Genre: Alternative hip-hop
- Length: 46:38
- Labels: RCA; Question Everything
- Producers: Kevin Abstract; Romil Hemnani (Note: Kevin Abstract and Romil Hemnani are credited under their production duo and record label Video Store.); Johan Lenox; Jabari Manwa; Queen Sixties; Baird; Goldwash; Chuks Chiejine; Federico Vindver; Joba; WilliamVanZandt; Christian Alexander; Chad Hugo; Dom McLennon; Bearface; Nick Velez; Boylife

Brockhampton chronology
Technical Difficulties Radio (2020)	Roadrunner: New Light, New Machine (2021)	The Family (2022)

Singles from Roadrunner: New Light, New Machine
- 1. "Buzzcut" Released: March 24, 2021; 2. "Count On Me" Released: April 2, 2021

Roadrunner: New Light, New Machine (often abbreviated to Roadrunner and stylized in all caps) is the sixth studio album by American hip-hop boy band Brockhampton. The album was released on April 9, 2021, through RCA and Question Everything, and received generally positive reviews from music critics. In a departure from the groups previous albums, Roadrunner features a number of guest appearances, from Danny Brown, JPEGMafia, A$AP Rocky, A$AP Ferg, SoGone SoFlexy, Charlie Wilson, Baird, and SSGKobe, along with uncredited appearances by Shawn Mendes and Ryan Beatty.

Promoted as the group's penultimate record, Roadrunner was the first album Brockhampton album to feature producer Jabari Manwa as a performing member, following his debut on Technical Difficulties Radio. It was also the final Brockhampton album to be executive produced by Kevin Abstract, and the last album to feature performances by every member of the group.

== Background ==
During the COVID-19 pandemic, Brockhampton released songs on their YouTube channel every weekend, and would sometimes livestream on Twitch and Instagram. During these streams, known as Technical Difficulties Radio, Brockhampton would play unreleased music, with some songs releasing shortly after the end of some streams. The series was abruptly cancelled, and in September 2020, Brockhampton producer Romil Hemnani revealed in an interview that the album's initials were RR, leaving fans to believe that the album was titled Roadrunner. The title was later confirmed, and the album's full title, Roadrunner: New Light, New Machine, was announced shortly after the release of the lead single "Buzzcut". Brockhampton recorded three different versions of Roadrunner and chose one for the final cut of the album. Kevin Abstract revealed on Twitter that Roadrunner was the first of "[two] Brockhampton albums [to be released] in 2021", later clarifying that the upcoming albums will be Brockhampton's final releases. The second album was later delayed to 2022, though on January 14, 2022, Brockhampton announced an indefinite hiatus following their Coachella performance in April 2022. That album, The Family, was announced October 27, 2022, set for a November 17 release.

After the album was released, Abstract announced via TikTok that a deluxe edition of the album was to be released soon. The Plus Pack edition of the album was released on June 4, 2021, including four new songs.

== Critical reception ==
Professional ratings
Aggregate scores
Source	Rating
AnyDecentMusic?	7.0/10
Metacritic	79/100
Review scores
Source	Rating
AllMusic	4.5/5 stars
Clash	8/10
Consequence of Sound	B
DIY	4.5/5 stars
The Independent	3/5 stars
The Line of Best Fit	7/10 stars
NME	3/5 stars
Paste	8.4/10
Pitchfork	7.4/10
Rolling Stone	3.5/5 stars

Roadrunner: New Light, New Machine was met with generally favorable reviews upon release. At Metacritic, which assigns a normalized rating out of 100 to reviews from professional publications, the release received an average score of 79, based on 13 reviews, indicating "generally favorable reviews". Aggregator AnyDecentMusic? gave the album a 7.0 out of 10, based on their assessment of the critical consensus.

Amongst the positive reviews from critics, AllMusic's Neil Z. Yeung said that the album served as a "masterful group therapy session, picking up the broken pieces of life and uplifting with cautious optimism."

In June 2021, Billboard ranked the album among the best 15 albums released by LGBTQ artists in 2021 so far.

== Lyrics ==
Prior to the album's release, one member of Brockhampton, Joba, commented that the lyrics of Roadrunner contains themes that are very personal to the members, including the suicide of Joba's father. Kevin Abstract noted that there would be lyrics about his sexuality on the record.

== Track listing ==
Credits adapted from official website.

Roadrunner: New Light, New Machine track listing
No.	Title	Writer(s)	Producer(s)	Length
1.	"Buzzcut" (featuring Danny Brown)	Ian Simpson; Imondre Goss; Daniel Sewell; Russell Boring; Romil Hemnani; Jabari Manwarring; Jared Scharff; Jeremy Ruzumna; Joseph Karnes; Stephen Feigenbaum; Vasant Sundaresan	Video Store; Jabari Manwa; Queen Sixties; Johan Lenox^{[a]}^{[b]}; Russell "Joba" Boring^{[a]}	3:21
2.	"Chain On" (featuring JPEGMafia)	I. Simpson; Barrington Hendricks; Dominique Simpson; Hemnani; Isaac Hayes; David Porter; Gary Grice; Clifford Smith; Russell Jones; Robert Diggs; Dennis Coles; Jason Hunter; Corey Woods; Lamont Hawkins	Video Store	3:21
3.	"Count On Me"	Rakim Mayers; Manwarring; Ryan Beatty; I. Simpson; Matthew Champion; Boring; Dalvin Serino; Hemnani; Jared Scharff; Jeremy Ruzumna; Joseph Karnes	Manwa; Video Store; Queen Sixties	2:35
4.	"Bankroll" (featuring A$AP Rocky and A$AP Ferg)	Mayers; Darold Ferguson Jr.; William Wood; Champion; Hemnani; Manwarring; I. Simpson; Baird Acheson; Isaiah Merriweather; Sundaresan	Video Store; Manwa; Baird	3:22
5.	"The Light"	I. Simpson; Boring; Jonathan Nunes; Hemnani; Manwarring; Merriweather; B. Acheson; Gabriel Acheson	Video Store; Manwa; Baird; Goldwash	3:42
6.	"Windows" (featuring SoGone SoFlexy)	Serino; Abhi Raju; Wood; Champion; D. Simpson; Boring; I. Simpson; Beatty; Goss; Ciarán McDonald; Merriweather; Hemnani; Manwarring; Darryl Gibbs; Dominic Painter; Hasani Lateef Chapman; M. Jacobs Jr.; Shaeem Wright	Kiko Merley; Video Store; Manwa	6:11
7.	"I'll Take You On" (featuring Charlie Wilson)	I. Simpson; McDonald; Boring; Champion; Charles Wilson; Orlando Emerson; Simon Newsome; Manwarring; Chuks Chiejine; Hemnani; Merriweather; Federico Vindver; B. Acheson	Manwa; Chiejine; Video Store; Vindver	4:14
8.	"Old News" (featuring Baird)	Manwarring; Champion; B. Acheson; Wood; Boring; D. Simpson; Hemnani; William Van Zandt; Nathaniel Johnson	Baird; Manwa; Joba; WilliamVanZandt; Video Store	3:13
9.	"What's the Occasion?"	Champion; Boring; Hemnani; I. Simpson; B. Acheson; Christian Alexander; Manwarring; G. Acheson	Video Store; Baird; Joba; Alexander; Manwa^{[a]}	3:45
10.	"When I Ball"	D. Simpson; Jeremiah Cobra; Champion; Boring; I. Simpson; Chad Hugo; B. Acheson; Alex O'Connor	Hugo; Baird^{[a]}; Goldwash^{[a]}	3:23
11.	"Don’t Shoot Up the Party"	I. Simpson; Champion; Boring; McDonald; Hemnani; Manwarring; Merriweather; B. Acheson; G. Acheson	Joba; Video Store; Manwa; Baird; Goldwash^{[a]}; Dom McLennon^{[a]}	3:07
12.	"Dear Lord"	McDonald; Nick Velez; Ryan Yoo	Bearface; Velez; boylife	2:02
13.	"The Light Pt. II"	I. Simpson; Boring; Hemnani; B. Acheson; Vindver; Van Zandt; Henry Robert Solomon; Edelmiro Molinari	Video Store; Baird; Vindver; WilliamVanZandt; Goldwash^{[a]}	4:18
Total length:				46:38

Physical edition bonus tracks
No.	Title	Writer(s)	Producer(s)	Length
14.	"Roberto's Interlude"	Robert Ontenient; Velez; McDonald	Velez; Bearface	0:53
15.	"Jeremiah"	I. Simpson; Champion; Wood; Beatty; Manwarring; Merriweather	Manwa	2:59
16.	"Sex"	I. Simpson; D. Simpson; Champion; Boring; McDonald; Wood; Manwarring; Hemnani; Merriweather; B. Acheson	Joba; Manwa; Video Store; Baird	3:36
17.	"Pressure / Bow Wow" (featuring SSGKobe)	Wood; D. Simpson; Hemnani; B. Acheson; Manwarring; I. Simpson; T. Pellerin; Manwarring; Van Zandt	Video Store; Manwa; Baird; McLennon^{[a]}; Manwa; Video Store; WillamVanZandt^{[a]}	2:45

Digital Plus Pack
No.	Title	Writer(s)	Producer(s)	Length
14.	"Pressure / Bow Wow" (featuring SSGKobe)	Wood; D. Simpson; Hemnani; B. Acheson; Manwarring; I. Simpson; T. Pellerin; Manwarring; Van Zandt	Video Store; Manwa; Baird; McLennon^{[a]}; Manwa; Video Store; WillamVanZandt^{[a]}	2:44
15.	"Sex"	I. Simpson; D. Simpson; Champion; Boring; McDonald; Wood; Manwarring; Hemnani; Merriweather; B. Acheson	Joba; Manwa; Video Store; Baird	3:37
16.	"Jeremiah (Rmx)"	I. Simpson; Champion; Wood; Beatty; Manwarring; Merriweather	Manwa	3:00
17.	"Jeremiah (Original)"	I. Simpson; Champion; Wood; Beatty; Manwarring; Merriweather	Kiko Merley	3:03

=== Notes ===
- All tracks are stylized in all caps. For example, "Buzzcut" is stylized as "BUZZCUT".
- ^{^[a]} signifies an additional producer.
- ^{^[b]} signifies a strings producer.
- "Jeremiah (Rmx)" from the Digital Plus Pack is the same song as "Jeremiah" from the physical edition.

=== Samples ===
- "Chain On" contains samples from "September Romance Intro", written and performed by Isaac Hayes, "C.R.E.A.M.", written by David Porter, Gary Grice, Clifford Smith, Russell Jones, Robert Diggs, Dennis Coles, Jason Hunter, Corey Woods and Lamont Hawkins, and performed by Wu-Tang Clan, and "As Long as I Have You", performed by the Charmels.
- "Windows" contains excerpts and a sample of "It's Me Who Loves You", written by Darryl Gibbs and performed by Crown Heights Affair, excerpts from "In the Struggle", written by Dominic Painter, Hasani Lateef Chapman and M. Jacobs Jr., and performed by Reborn Soldiers, and "Em3", written by Shaheel Wright and performed by Lord Apex.
- "Old News" contains excerpts from "Keep Your Faith to the Sky", written by Nathaniel Johnson and performed by Willie Scott & the Birmingham Spirituals.
- "The Light Pt. II" contains excerpts from "Hace casi 2000 años", written by Edelmiro Molinari and performed by Color Humano.

== Personnel ==
Credits adapted from Tidal.

Brockhampton

- Kevin Abstract – vocals, creative direction
- Merlyn Wood – vocals
- Joba – vocals, programming (1), synthesizer (4), bass (7), vocal arrangement (13)
- Matt Champion – vocals
- Dom McLennon – vocals, recording engineer (2), programming (4)
- Bearface – vocals, recording engineer (12), mixing engineer (12, 14)
- Jabari Manwa – vocals, background vocals (1, 11), additional vocals (17)
- Romil Hemnani – recording engineer (tracks 1–11, 13, 15–17)
- Kiko Merley – programming (4), background vocals (6)
- Henock "HK" Sileshi – art direction, graphic design
- Robert Ontenient – additional vocals (14), web development
- Jon Nunes – day-to-day management
- Ashlan Grey – photography
- BH NGR – art direction assistance
  - Ashlan Grey
  - Nick Holiday
  - Weston Freas

Additional musicians

- Johan Lenox – background vocals (1), programming (1), strings (1)
- Imondre Goss – background vocals (1, 6)
- Versus – flute (1, 4), saxophone (1, 6)
- Shawn Mendes – vocals (3)
- Ryan Beatty – vocals (3, 6), background vocals (track 15)
- Baird – background vocals (4, 6), guitar (4), programming (4), additional vocals (6)
- Christian Alexander – background vocals (5, 10)
- Abhi Raju – guitar (6)
- Lando – background vocals (7)
- Odunayo Ekunboyejo – background vocals (8)
- Nick Velez – drums (9)
- Goldwash – keyboards (9), organ (9), background vocals (11), piano (11), synthesizer (11)
- Alex O'Connor – background vocals (10)
- Zuri Marley – background vocals (10)

Technical

- Mike Bozzi – mastering engineer
- Derek "MixedByAli" Ali – mixing engineer (1–11, 13)
- Curtis "Sircut" Bye – mixing engineer (1–11, 13)
- Tyler Shields – recording engineer (3, 6–10, 13, 16)
- Baird – recording engineer (4, 6, 8, 10, 11, 16)
- Anthony Jordan Smets – recording engineer (7)
- Boylife – recording engineer (12)
- Nick Velez – recording engineer (14)
- Jacob Bryant – assistant engineer (1–11, 13)

== Charts ==
Chart performance for Roadrunner: New Light, New Machine
Chart (2021)	Peak position
Australian Albums (ARIA)	6
Belgian Albums (Ultratop Flanders)	35
Canadian Albums (Billboard)	17
Danish Albums (Hitlisten)	27
Dutch Albums (Album Top 100)	64
Finnish Albums (Suomen virallinen lista)	31
Irish Albums (Official Charts)	11
Lithuanian Albums (AGATA)	10
New Zealand Albums (RMNZ)	5
Norwegian Albums (VG-lista)	23
Scottish Albums (Official Charts)	75
Swedish Albums (Sverigetopplistan)	58
Swiss Albums (Schweizer Hitparade)	92
UK Albums (Official Charts)	24
UK R&B Albums (Official Charts)	4
US Billboard 200	11
US Top R&B/Hip-Hop Albums (Billboard)	6
