= Merlyn Wood =

Ghanaian-American rapper (born 1996)

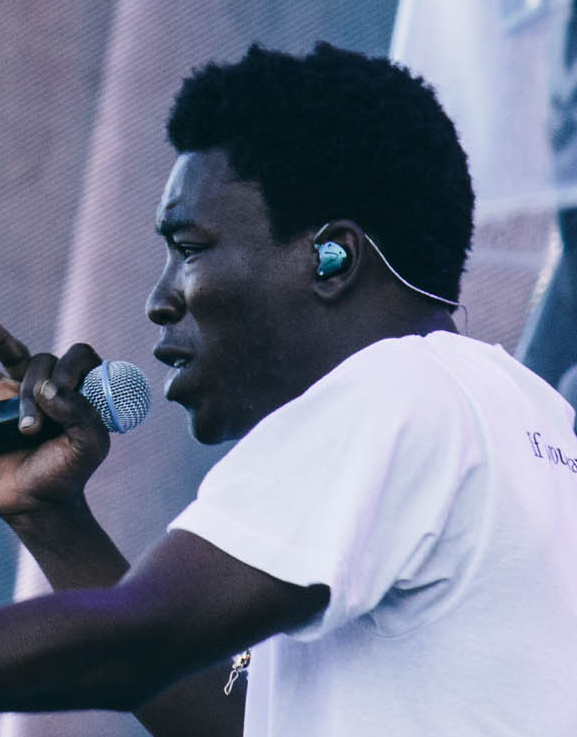
- Wood performing in 2018 in Quebec City

Background information
- Born: William Anku Kraka Mawuli Andoh Wood Jr. May 1, 1996 (age 30); Accra, Ghana
- Genre: Rap
- Occupations: Rapper; songwriter
- Years active: 2012–present
- Formerly of: Brockhampton; AliveSinceForever

William Anku Kraka Mawuli Andoh Wood Jr. (born May 1, 1996), known by his stage name Merlyn Wood, is a Ghanaian-American rapper and songwriter. Born in Accra and raised in Texas, Wood is best known for his work as a member of hip-hop collective and boyband Brockhampton, with whom he released eight studio albums from 2014 to 2022. During his time with Brockhampton, Wood was recognized as the group’s hype man, with his verses being noted for their energy and Ghanaian accent.

== Early life ==
Wood was born in Accra and raised in Austin, Texas. Wood credits his Ghanaian ancestry as influencing his musical style. In the 7th grade, Wood was sent by his parents to a boarding school in Ghana, where he developed a passion for music. While a student of The Woodlands High School, Wood met future bandmates Kevin Abstract, Matt Champion, Ameer Vann, and Russell "Joba" Boring. Prior to joining Brockhampton full time, Wood was studying architecture at the University of Texas, which he dropped out from twice. After realizing he could not feasibly pass one of his classes, he decided to relocate to Los Angeles with the rest of the band.

Wood derived his stage name, Merlyn, from the mythical figure Merlin, as he admired the character's success despite his eccentricity.

== Career ==
=== 2012–2022: Brockhampton ===
Wood joined San Marcos, Texas based hip-hop group AliveSinceForever in 2012, while developing his solo career. On June 30, 2015, Wood released his debut single "Fye". In September 2016, it was followed by "Cul de Sac".

When AliveSinceForever reformed as Brockhampton in 2014, Wood remained part of the group, and was a key member during the recording of the groups critically acclaimed 2017 album trilogy Saturation, Saturation II, and Saturation III. After signing to RCA Records and removing Ameer Vann from the group amidst allegations of sexual misconduct, Brockhampton released their fourth studio album, Iridescence, in September 2018. Iridescence debuted atop the Billboard charts and was followed by Ginger and Roadrunner: New Light, New Machine in 2019 and 2021, respectively.

In a 2021 interview for Apple Music, Brockhampton revealed that between the release of Ginger and Roadrunner, work had begun on a Merlyn Wood solo album in collaboration with RZA of Wu-Tang Clan, although the project was never released.

Later in 2021, Wood released the single "S.Y.K." alongside producer Connie, his first solo release since the release of Saturation in 2017.

Following the cancellation of the groups "Here Right Now" tour on January 14, 2022, Brockhampton's final studio albums, The Family and TM were released on November 17 and 18, respectively.

=== 2022–present: Solo work ===
"Green Light", another collaboration with Connie, was released on May 31, 2022, as Wood's first single following Brockhampton's dissolution. It was followed by "One of Us" on September 5.

In April 2023, Wood was a featured artist on Dreamer Isioma's sophomore album Princess Forever. In June, he released the collaborative single "Formula" with Dumb Buoys Fishing Club and Joe Unknown, off of the former's debut album Wrecked. Wood was also featured on "Skeleton Town", on the same record.

Wood released his debut solo EP Dirty Thunder on October 6, 2023. Shortly afterwards, Slime In The Ice Machine, a collaborative album with former Brockhampton member Ameer Vann, was released on October 27. In December of that year, Wood was featured on Dark Songs To Drive To, by Montreal rapper Nate Husser.

== Discography ==
=== Collaborative albums ===
List of collaborative studio albums
Title	Album details
Slime in the Ice Machine (with Ameer Vann)	Released: October 27, 2023; Label: Blacksmith Recordings; Formats: Streaming, digital download

=== Extended plays ===
Title	Album details
Dirty Thunder	Released: October 6, 2023; Label: Don't Be Greedy; Formats: Streaming, digital download

=== Singles ===
==== As lead artist ====
Title	Year	Album
"Fye"	2015	Non-album singles
"Culdesac"	2016	Non-album singles
"Forget Me Not"	2017	Non-album singles
"S.Y.K." (with Connie)	2021	Non-album singles
"Green Light"	2022	Non-album singles
"One of Us"	2022	Non-album singles
"Blackout"	2023	Dirty Thunder
"Mazza" (feat. Adetola)	2023	Dirty Thunder

==== As featured artist ====
Title	Year	Other performer(s)
"Breath"	2017	Reverse
"Get Out"	2022	Nate Husser
"Chains"	2022	Gidi, SoGone SoFlexy
"I Got the Love"	2023	Tommy Richman, Nate Dae

=== Guest appearances ===
List of non-single guest appearances, with other performing artists, showing year released and album name
Title	Year	Other performer(s)	Album
"Show You Off" (Remix)	2021	Michael Kirby	The Lion Inside You
"Get Out"	2022	Nate Husser	All Time High
"Touch Your Soul"	2023	Dreamer Isioma	Princess Forever
"Formula"	2023	Dumb Buoys Fishing Club, Joe Unknown	Wrecked
"Skeleton Town"	2023	Dumb Buoys Fishing Club, Qhairo	Wrecked
"Up the Pipe"	2023	Nate Husser	Dark Songs to Drive To

== Filmography ==
Year	Title		
Year	Title	Role	Medium
2015	Dreams Die Young	Himself	Short Series
2016	All-American Trash Documentary	Himself	Documentary
2017	American Boyband	Himself	Documentary Series
2017	Jennifer's Tour, A Live Show By Brockhampton	Himself	Documentary Series
2017	Billy Star	"South Central" Crew	Short Film
2017	Saturation	Himself	Documentary
2018	Love Your Parents Tour	Himself	Documentary Series
2018	The Longest Summer In America	Himself	Documentary
2019	Keeping The Band	Himself (fictionalized depiction)	Series

=== Music videos ===
List of music videos as Merlyn Wood
Title	Year	Album(s)	Director(s)
"S.Y.K"	2021	—N/a	Connie, WellKnownStudios
"Green Light"	2022	—N/a	Miggy
"One of Us"	2022	—N/a	Sean Russo
"Mazza" (feat. Adetola)	2023	Dirty Thunder	Evijan John
