= Danny Brown discography =

Hip hop recording artist discography

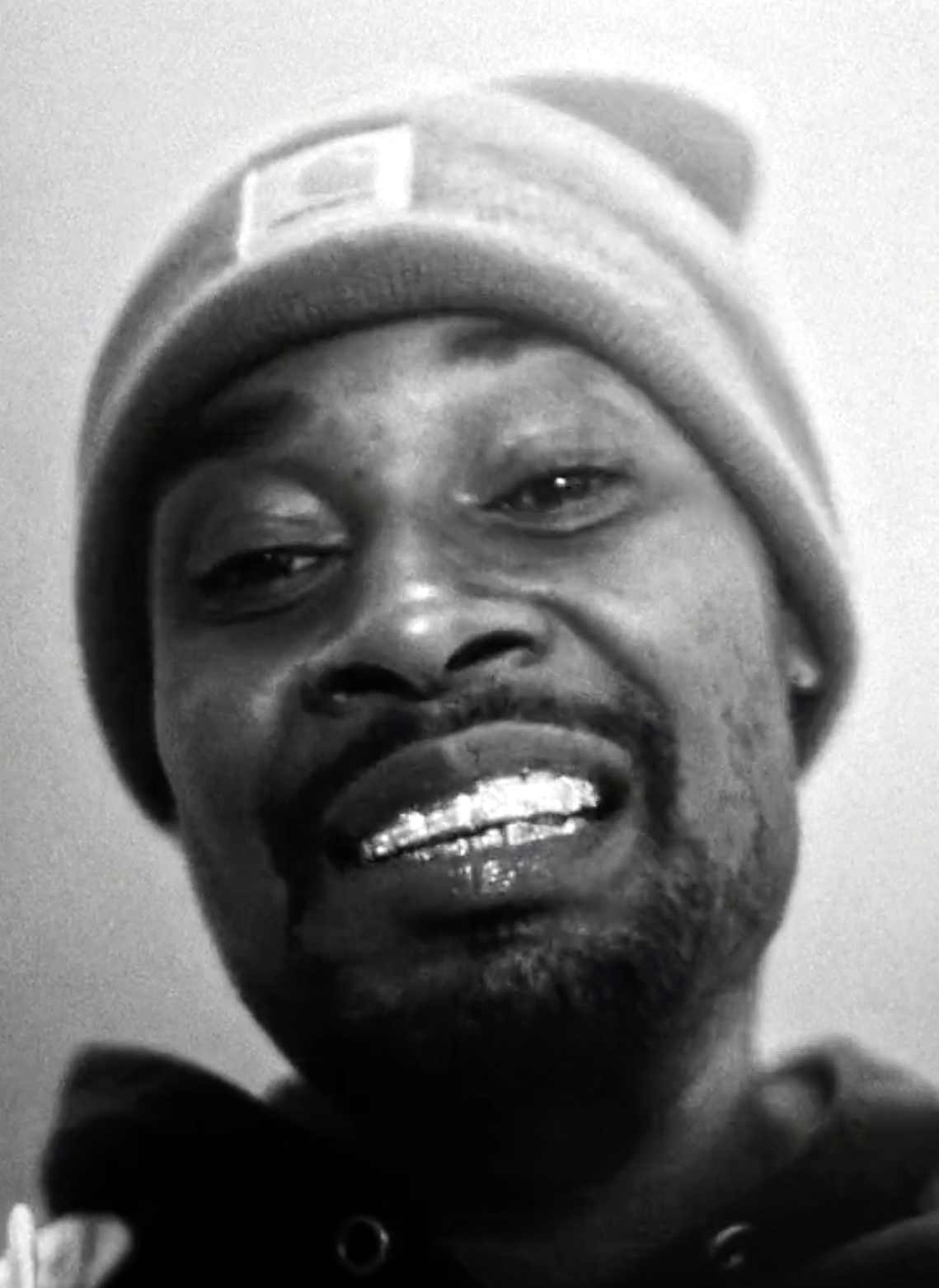
- Danny Brown in 2017
- Studio albums: 6
- EPs: 5
- Singles: 42
- Music videos: 37
- Mixtapes: 9
- Collaborative albums: 3
- Promotional singles: 2
- Guest appearances: 97

The discography of Danny Brown, an American hip hop recording artist, consists of six studio albums, three collaborative albums, five extended plays (EPs), ten mixtapes, 42 singles (including 23 as a featured artist), two promotional singles and 37 music videos.

== Albums ==
=== Studio albums ===
List of albums, with selected chart positions
Title	Album details	Peak chart positions				
Title	Album details	US	US R&B/HH	US Rap	AUS	CAN
The Hybrid	Released: March 16, 2010; Label: Rappers I Know; Format: Digital download	—	—	—	—	—
Old	Released: October 8, 2013; Label: Fool's Gold Records; Format: CD, LP, digital download	18	4	3	61	—
Atrocity Exhibition	Released: September 27, 2016; Label: Warp; Format: CD, LP, digital download	77	5	3	48	50
U Know What I'm Sayin?	Released: October 4, 2019; Label: Warp; Format: CD, LP, digital download	134	—	—	—	93
Quaranta	Released: November 17, 2023; Label: Warp; Format: CD, LP, digital download	—	—	—	—	—
Stardust	Released: November 7, 2025; Label: Warp; Format: CD, LP, digital download	—	—	—	—	—
"—" denotes a title that did not chart, or was not released in that territory.

=== Collaborative albums ===
List of collaborative studio albums
Title	Album details
Runispokets-N-Dumpemindariva (as Rese'vor Dogs)	Released: 2003; Label: Ren-A-Sance Entertainment, F.B.C. Records; Format: CD
TV62 (as Bruiser Brigade)	Released: May 14, 2021; Label: Bruiser Brigade Records; Format: Digital download
Scaring the Hoes (with JPEGMafia)	Released: March 24, 2023; Label: AWAL, Peggy; Format: Streaming, digital download

== EPs ==
List of extended plays, with selected details
Title	Details
Black and Brown! (with Black Milk)	Released: November 1, 2011; Label: Fat Beats Records; Format: CD, digital download
Bruiser Brigade (with Bruiser Brigade)	Released: September 19, 2012; Label: Scion A/V, Fool's Gold; Format: Digital download
The OD EP	Released: September 25, 2012; Label: Fool's Gold Records; Format: Digital download, vinyl
Twitch EP	Released: August 28, 2018; Label: Self-released; Format: Digital download
Scaring the Hoes: DLC Pack (with JPEGMafia)	Released: July 11, 2023; Label: AWAL, Peggy; Format: Streaming, digital download

== Mixtapes ==
List of mixtapes, with year released
Title	Album details
Detroit State of Mind	Released: August 30, 2007; Label: Self-released; Format: Digital download
Hot Soup	Released: July 1, 2008; Label: Self-released; Format: Digital download
Detroit State of Mind 2	Released: 2008; Label: Self-released; Format: Digital download
Detroit State of Mind 3	Released: 2009; Label: Self-released; Format: Digital download
Detroit State of Mind 4	Released: March 8, 2010; Label: Self-released; Format: Digital download
The Hybrid: Cutting Room Floor	Released: March 15, 2010; Label: Self-released; Format: Digital download
It's a Art (with Johnson&Jonson)	Released: April 18, 2010; Label: Self-released; Format: Digital download
Browntown	Released: 31 July 2010; Label: Self-released; Format: Digital download
Hawaiian Snow (with Tony Yayo)	Released: September 14, 2010; Label: Self-released; Format: Digital download
XXX	Released: August 15, 2011; Label: Fool's Gold Records; Format: CD, LP, digital download

== Singles ==
=== As lead artist ===
List of singles as lead artist, with selected chart positions, showing year released and album name
Title	Year	Peak chart positions			Album
Title	Year	US	US R&B /HH	US Rap	Album
"Grown Up"	2012	—	—	—	Non-album singles
"Change"	2012	—	—	—	Non-album singles
"Dip"	2013	—	—	—	Old
"25 Bucks" (featuring Purity Ring)	2014	—	—	—	Old
"Smokin & Drinkin"	2014	—	—	—	Old
"Detroit vs. Everybody" (with Eminem, Royce da 5'9", Big Sean, Dej Loaf and Trick-Trick)	2014	— (Note: "Detroit Vs. Everybody" did not enter the US Billboard Hot 100, but peaked at number eight on the Bubbling Under Hot 100 Singles chart.)	28	23	Shady XV
"When It Rain"	2016	—	—	—	Atrocity Exhibition
"Pneumonia"	2016	—	—	—	Atrocity Exhibition
"Really Doe" (featuring Kendrick Lamar, Ab-Soul and Earl Sweatshirt)	2016	—	—	—	Atrocity Exhibition
"Ain't It Funny"	2017	—	—	—	Atrocity Exhibition
"Dirty Laundry"	2019	—	—	—	U Know What I'm Sayin?
"Best Life"	2019	—	—	—	U Know What I'm Sayin?
"3 Tearz" (with Run the Jewels)	2019	—	—	—	U Know What I'm Sayin?
"Lean Beef Patty" (with JPEGMafia)	2023	—	—	—	Scaring the Hoes
"Tantor"	2023	—	—	—	Quaranta
"Jenn's Terrific Vacation" (featuring Kassa Overall)	2023	—	—	—	Quaranta
"Dark Sword Angel"	2024	—	—	—	Quaranta
"Starburst"	2025	—	—	—	Stardust
"Okok" (with Fred Again, Beam, Parisi and JPEGMafia)	2025	—	—	—	USB
"Copycats" (with Underscores)	2025	—	—	—	Stardust
"—" denotes a recording that did not chart or was not released in that territory.

=== As featured artist ===
List of singles as featured artist, showing year released and album name
Title	Year	Album
"Piss Test" (A-Trak featuring Juicy J and Danny Brown)	2012	Fool's Gold Presents: Loosies
"Jay Dee's Revenge" (J Dilla featuring Danny Brown)	2012	Rebirth of Detroit
"Flight Confirmation" (The Alchemist featuring Danny Brown and Schoolboy Q)	2012	Russian Roulette
"You Never Asked" (The D.O.T. featuring Clare Maguire and Danny Brown)	2012	And That
"The Black Brad Pitt" (Evil Nine featuring Danny Brown)	2012	Non-album singles
"When I'm Clownin'" (Insane Clown Posse featuring Danny Brown)	2013	Non-album singles
"Choppa" (Joey Fatts featuring ASAP Rocky and Danny Brown)	2013	Chipper Jones Vol. 2
"Hail Mary" (K.Flay featuring Danny Brown)	2013	What If It Is
"All My Niggas" (E-40 featuring Danny Brown and Schoolboy Q)	2013	The Block Brochure: Welcome to the Soil 5
"Six Degrees" (Ghostface Killah and BADBADNOTGOOD featuring Danny Brown)	2014	Sour Soul
"Attak" (Rustie featuring Danny Brown)	2014	Green Language
"Weightin' On" (Lucki Eck$ featuring Danny Brown)	2014	Non-album single
"Rambunctious" (BeatKing featuring Danny Brown and Riff Raff)	2014	Underground Cassette Tape Music
"Bodies on Fairfax" (Westside Gunn featuring Danny Brown)	2016	Flygod
"Frankie Sinatra" (The Avalanches featuring Danny Brown and MF Doom)	2016	Wildflower
"Accelerator" (Paul White featuring Danny Brown)	2017	Non-album single
"Deadcrush" (Alt-J featuring Danny Brown and The Alchemist)	2018	Reduxer
"Buzzcut" (Brockhampton featuring Danny Brown)	2021	Roadrunner: New Light, New Machine
"Five Nights" (Freddie Dredd featuring Danny Brown)	2023	Freddie's Inferno (Deluxe)
"Shake It Like A" (Frost Children featuring Danny Brown)	2024	Non-album single
"Bird W/O Nest" (Alice Longyu Gao featuring Danny Brown)	2024	Assembling Symbols Into My Own Poetry
"EENIE MINEY MOE!" (ISSBROKIE featuring Danny Brown)	2024	Non-album single
"Pop Pop Pop" (Idles featuring Danny Brown)	2024	Non-album single
"M3 N MIN3" (Femtanyl featuring Danny Brown)	2024	REACTOR
"G.I.R.L." (8485 featuring Danny Brown)	2025	Non-album single

=== Promotional singles ===
List of promotional singles, showing year released and album name
Title	Year	Album
"4 Loko (Remix)" (Smoke DZA featuring ASAP Rocky, ASAP Twelvy, Danny Brown, Killa Kyleon and Freeway)	2012	Sweet Baby Kushed God
"New World Order (Remix)" (SD featuring Danny Brown)	2013	Non-album single

== Other charted and certified songs ==
List of songs, with selected chart positions, showing year released and album name
Title	Year	Peak chart positions					Certifications	Album
Title	Year	US	US R&B /HH	US Rap	US Rock	NZ Hot	Certifications	Album
"1 Train" (ASAP Rocky featuring Kendrick Lamar, Joey Badass, Yelawolf, Danny Brown, Action Bronson and Big K.R.I.T.)	2013	— (Note: "1 Train" did not enter the US Billboard Hot 100, but peaked at number three on the Bubbling Under Hot 100 Singles chart.)	31	25	—	—	RIAA: Gold; RMNZ: Gold	Long. Live. ASAP
"Submission" (Gorillaz featuring Kelela and Danny Brown)	2017	—	—	—	21	—		Humanz
"Steppa Pig" (JPEGMafia and Danny Brown)	2023	—	—	—	—	40		Scaring the Hoes
"Burfict!" (JPEGMafia and Danny Brown)	2023	—	—	—	—	34		Scaring the Hoes
"—" denotes a recording that did not chart or was not released in that territory.

== Guest appearances ==
List of non-single guest appearances, with other performing artists, showing year released and album name
Title	Year	Artist(s)	Album
"D-Boy Magic"	2007	Nick Speed, 87	D-Tour
"Fire (Remix)"	2008	Elzhi, Black Milk, Guilty Simpson, Fat Ray, Fatt Father	The Preface
"Mama Did Her Best"	2008	Fatt Father, Marv Won	Christmas With Fatt Father
"Contra"	2009	Elzhi	The Leftovers
"Dilla Bot vs. the Hybrid"	2009	J Dilla	Jay Stay Paid
"Alex Foley"	2009	Marv Won, Chips Dinero	Way Of The Won
"Cut The Lights Out!"	2009	Crown Nation (Quelle Chris and Denmark Vessey), Dopehead	$lutbag Edition
"Black and Brown"	2010	Black Milk	Album of the Year
"Theme Music to a Killing Spree"	2011	Danny!	Where Is Danny?
"Lil Shop of Horror"	2011	Tony Yayo	Gunpowder Guru 3
"STYLE!"	2011	Chavis Chandler, Crack Killz da God	Breath of Fresh Air II
"Jahphy Joe"	2011	Random Axe, Melanie Rutherford	Random Axe
"Power"	2011	Das Racist, Despot	Relax
"Fuck Sleep"	2011	Thoth, Guilty Simpson	Volume One
"Ray Ban Vision (Remix)"	2011	A-Trak, Donnis, Pill, CyHi the Prynce	—N/a
"One of Life's Pleasures"	2011	Paul White	Rapping with Paul White
"Bag Up"	2011	Tony Yayo, Fred the Godson	Meyer Lansky
"Cloud Skatin"	2011	Main Attrakionz	Blackberry Kush
"DMT Sessions"	2011	Esham	DMT Sessions
"From the Back"	2011	Flosstradamus	Jubilation
"Rumor Has It"	2011	Wallpaper.	—N/a
"The Last Huzzah!"	2011	Mr. Muthafuckin' eXquire, Despot, Das Racist, El-P	Lost in Translation
"Gucci Rag Top (Remix)"	2011	Kid Sister	Kiss & Tell
"Shotgun"	2011	Quelle Chris, Roc Marciano	Shotgun & Sleek Rifle
"You Have to Ride the Wave"	2012	Heems, Mr. Muthafuckin' eXquire	Nehru Jackets
"RazorBlade"	2012	Tony Yayo	El Chapo 2
"Paved Paths"	2012	Descry, ADaD, M.E.D., Von Pea	As Serenity Approaches
"Molly (On My Tongue)"	2012	Mach Five	Ratchet Shit Vol. 1
"Terrorist Threats"	2012	Ab-Soul, Jhené Aiko	Control System
"Sweet"	2012	House Shoes	Let It Go
"Oh Hail No"	2012	El-P, Mr. Muthafuckin' eXquire	Cancer 4 Cure
"Blueberry (Pills & Cocaine)"	2012	Darq E Freaker	Blueberry (Remixes)
"Cobra Commander"	2012	Open Mike Eagle	4NML HSPTL
"Toxic"	2012	Childish Gambino	Royalty
"I'm Out Here" (Remix)	2012	Dusty McFly, Big Sean, Peezy, Boldy James	Buffies&Benihanas II
"Tables"	2012	Tony Yayo, Cory Gunz	Sex, Drugs, & Hip-Hop
"Betcha Hate It (Remix)"	2012	Rich Hil	—N/a
"Coke & White Bitches: Chapter 2"	2012	ASAP Ant, Fat Trel, Gunplay	Lords Never Worry
"Spaceship"	2012	MHz Legacy	MHz Legacy
"Gold"	2012	Don Trip, Starlito	Help Is on the Way
"Belispeak II"	2012	Purity Ring	—N/a
"Tick, Tock"	2012	Pusha T, Raekwon, Joell Ortiz	Music from and Inspired by the Motion Picture The Man with the Iron Fists
"Mini Van Dan (Remix)"	2012	Aston Matthews, ASAP Nast, Flatbush Zombies	Versace Ragz
"Molly Ringwald"	2012	—N/a	Fool's Gold Presents: Loosies
"1 Train"	2013	ASAP Rocky, Kendrick Lamar, Joey Badass, Yelawolf, Action Bronson, Big K.R.I.T.	LONG.LIVE.A$AP
"Headfirst"	2013	DJ Muggs	Bass for Your Face
"Jealousy"	2013	The Purist	TR-ILL
"Hottest MC"	2013	Harry Fraud	Adrift
"Street Lights"	2013	Paul White	Watch the Ants
"Hail Mary"	2013	K.Flay	What If It Is and Need for Speed: Rivals soundtrack
"Oh Lord"	2013	Cassow	Cold Winter
"What I Like (Remix)"	2013	Charli XCX	—N/a
"No Faces"	2013	Tree	Sunday School II: When Church Lets Out
"Mixtape"	2013	Nakim	Reppin'
"Tomorrow's Gone"	2013	Mr. Muthafuckin Exquire, Nacho Picasso, Flatbush Zombies	Kismet
"Thizzles"	2013	Tech N9ne	Something Else
"Vodka & Weed"	2013	Jon Connor	Unconscious State
"Quez"	2013	Trinidad James, Fabo, Playa Fly	10 PC Mild
"Reynolds"	2013	ASAP Ferg	—N/a
"Evil Friends (Jake One Remix)"	2013	Portugal. The Man	—N/a
"Drug Parade"	2013	Flatbush Zombies	BetterOffDead
"Max B"	2013	TRPL BLK	Big Dick Niggas Eat Pussy Too
"Bout It Bout It Pt. 3"	2013	Dopehead	Devil's Heaven
"Devil's Heaven"	2013	Dopehead	Devil's Heaven
"The D.U.I. Song(s)"	2013	Starlito	Fried Turkey
"Sweeney Song"	2013	MNDSGN	Classic Drug References Vol. 1
"If I Could"	2013	Gino Marley	Raised in the Streets
"Step" (Remix)	2013	Vampire Weekend, Despot, Heems	—N/a
"High"	2014	Freddie Gibbs and Madlib	Piñata
"Thunda Cats"	2014	Zelooperz	Help
"Fallin"	2014	Zelooperz, Dopehead	Help
"Ride Slow"	2014	Ab-Soul, Delusional Thomas	These Days…
"Ego Death"	2014	Busdriver, Aesop Rock	Perfect Hair
"Black Out Days (Remix)"	2014	Phantogram, Leo Justi	—N/a
"H8M4CH1N3"	2014	The Neighbourhood	#000000 & #FFFFFF
"Bad News"	2015	Action Bronson	Welcome to Los Santos
"BDA (Remix)"	2015	BeatKing	Club God 4
"Hereditary (2 Bitches)"	2015	Kembe X	Talk Back
"Tha Low"	2015	Donmonique, Slayter	Thirst Trap
"I Drive By"	2016	Riff Raff, Gucci Mane	Peach Panther
"Wrath"	2016	DTCHPLNES	Techoir
"Hella Hoes (Remix)"	2016	ASAP Mob, Aston Mathews	—N/a
"The Wozard of Iz"	2016	The Avalanches	Wildflower
"Hey Kids (Bumaye)"	2016	Run the Jewels	Run the Jewels 3
"Grandma Hips"	2017	Your Old Droog	Packs
"Horror Show"	2017	DJ Shadow	The Mountain Fell EP
"Submission"	2017	Gorillaz, Kelela	Humanz
"Kool-Aid"	2017	—N/a	Silicon Valley (Soundtrack)
"SeanPaulWasNeverThereToGimmeTheLight"	2017	Bones	NoRedeemingQualities
"The Appetite"	2018	Dabrye, Roc Marciano, Quelle Chris	Three/Three
"Beach House"	2018	Petite Noir	La Maison Noir / The Black House
"Dad Feels Good (Jankins Boosted Mix)"	2019	Dad	—N/a
"Unfiltered"	2019	Open Mike Eagle	The New Negroes (Season 1)
"Ready to Go"	2019	Baauer, Channel Tres	GTA 5: iFruit Radio
"Out the Slums (Remix)"	2020	Drakeo the Ruler, 03 Greedo	—N/a
"Get Up"	2021	Jimmy Edgar	Cheetah Bend
"Vampire"	2021	Payday	Rap in a Can
"Bash Bandicoon"	2021	Zelooperz	Van Gogh's Left Ear
"Gentleman (dollywood1 Remix)"	2021	Dorian Electra, dollywood1	My Agenda
"House Settling"	2022	Quadeca	I Didn't Mean to Haunt You
"Now That's What I Call a Posse Cut Vol. 56"	2023	Blockhead, Despot, billy woods, Bruiser Wolf	The Aux
"Year Zero"	2023	Billy Woods, Kenny Segal	Maps
"Money n Bitches (Remix)"	2023	Wheeler Walker Jr	Ram
"Clock Ticking"	2023	Kassa Overall, Wiki	ANIMALS
"PACKAPUNCH"	2024	Joey Valence & Brae	No Hands
"2 Bad"	2024	Bruiser Wolf, ZelooperZ	My Story Got Stories
"Psychoboost"	2025	Jane Remover	Revengeseekerz
"Just Say No"	2025	Black Milk, Fat Ray	Food From the Goos
"Danny's Track"	2025	Kevin Abstract	Blush
"The Great Bakunawa"	2025	Quadeca	Vanisher, Horizon Scraper
"Discoteq"	2025	Reyshia Rami	Dextreau
"Heroine Iconoclast"	2025	Zheani	Long Live the Old Dead Gods
"Nostradamus"	2026	Zelooperz	Pin Breakers

== Music videos ==
=== As lead artist ===
List of music videos, showing year released and director
Title	Year	Director(s)
"Re-Up"	2010	—N/a
"Shootin Moves"	2010	—N/a
"The Hybrid"	2010	—N/a
"The Nana Song"	2010	—N/a
"Greatest Rapper Ever"	2010	—N/a
"Cyclops"	2010	Bruiser Brigade
"Guitar Solo"	2011	Tony Foster
"Black and Brown" (with Black Milk)	2011	Gerard Victor
"Blunt After Blunt	2012	ASAP Rocky, The ICU
"Monopoly"	2012	Ben Fries
"Radio Song"	2012	Alex/2tone
"Grown Up"	2012	Greg Brunkalla
"Witit"	2012	Bijoux Altamirano
"Shooting Moves"	2013	RUFFMERCY
"Dip"	2013	Rollo Jackson
"Side B (Dope Song)"	2013	Laurent Briet
"25 Bucks" (featuring Purity Ring)	2014	NORTON
"Smokin' & Drinkin'"	2014	Alan Del Rio Orti
"When It Rain"	2016	Mimi Cave
"Pneumonia"	2016	Simon Cahn
"Ain't it Funny"	2017	Jonah Hill
"Lost"	2017	Matilda Finn
"Dirty Laundry"	2019	Simon Cahn
"Best Life"	2019	Augustin Vita
"3 Tearz" (featuring Run the Jewels)	2020	Colin Read
"Savage Nomad"	2020	Simon Cahn
"Lean Beef Patty" (with JPEGMAFIA)	2023	JPEGMAFIA & anthony sylvester
"Scaring the Hoes" (with JPEGMAFIA)	2023	logan fields
"Tantor"	2023	*UNCANNY
"Jenn's Terrific Vacation"	2023	Noel Paul
"Y.B.P." (featuring Bruiser Wolf)	2024	Edem Wornoo & William Child
"Dark Sword Angel"	2024	Delphino Productions
"Stardust"	2025	DEADHORSES
"Copycats" (featuring underscores)	2025	Rollo Jackson

=== As featured artist ===
List of music videos, showing year released and director
Title	Year	Director(s)
"The Last Huzzah" (Mr. Muthafuckin’ eXquire featuring Despot, Das Racist, Danny Brown and EL-P)	2011	TKTK Media (Jiro Kohl & Vic Reznik)
"Gucci Rag Top (Remix)" (Kid Sister featuring Danny Brown)	2011	Alex/2tone
"Blueberry (Pills & Cocaine)" (Darq E Freaker featuring Danny Brown)	2012	Yoni Lappin
"Jay Dee's Revenge" (J Dilla featuring Danny Brown)	2012	—N/a
"Terrorist Threats" (Ab-Soul featuring Jhene Aiko and Danny Brown)	2012	APLUSFilmz
"Flight Confirmation" (The Alchemist featuring Danny Brown and Schoolboy Q)	2012	Jason Goldwatch
"Sweet" (House Shoes featuring Danny Brown)	2012	—N/a
"You Never Asked" (The D.O.T. featuring Clare Maguire and Danny Brown)	2012	—N/a
"Black Brad Pitt" (Evil Nine featuring Danny Brown)	2013	Julot/Julien
"Jealousy" (The Purist featuring Danny Brown)	2013	Globodigital Video
"Street Lights" (Paul White featuring Danny Brown)	2013	Plastic Horse
"Headfirst" (DJ Muggs featuring Danny Brown)	2013	Monsta
"When I'm Clownin'" (Insane Clown Posse featuring Danny Brown)	2013	Brian Kuma
"All My Niggas" (E-40 featuring Danny Brown and Schoolboy Q)	2013	Ben Griffin
"New World Order" (SD featuring Danny Brown)	2013	Zae
"Attak" (Rustie featuring Danny Brown)	2014	Peter Marsden
Deadcrush (Alchemist x Trokoo version) (alt-J featuring DB)	2018	Jaron Braxton
"Dad Feels Good (Boosted Mix" (Dad featuring DB)	2019	Mom
"Unfiltered" (Open Mike Eagle featuring DB)	2019	Lance Bangs
"Buzzcut" (Brockhampton featuring DB)	2021	Dan Strait
"2 Bad" (Bruiser Wolf featuring DB)	2024	Ziggy Waters
"PACKAPUNCH" (Brae & Joey Valence featuring DB)	2024	
"Shake it Like A" (Frost Children featuring DB)	2024	Iris Luz
"Bird W/O Nest" (Alice Longyu Gao featuring DB)	2024	Euree Hong
