= Golden Ticket (Golden Rules album) =

Studio album by Golden Rules
- Released: August 7, 2015
- Genre: Hip-hop
- Length: 42:10
- Label: Lex
- Producer: Paul White

Golden Ticket is the debut studio album by Golden Rules, a collaborative project between American rapper Eric Biddines and English record producer Paul White. It was released on August 7, 2015, through Lex Records. It peaked at number 22 on the UK Official Record Store Chart. It received universal acclaim from critics.

== Background ==
Eric Biddines is an American rapper from Florida, and Paul White is an English record producer from Lewisham. After hearing Biddines' music, White sent Biddines some of his own beats. The two then began collaborating as Golden Rules.

Golden Ticket is Golden Rules' debut studio album. It includes contributions from multi-instrumentalist Shawn Lee. The album's song "Never Die" features a guest appearance from rapper Yasiin Bey. The album's artwork is designed by ESPO.

Music videos were released for the songs "It's Over" and "The Let Down".

In 2015, Paul White released his remix of "Never Die" featuring Freddie Gibbs and Yasiin Bey. In 2021, Prefuse 73 released his remix of "Never Die" featuring Freddie Gibbs and Yasiin Bey.

== Critical reception ==
Professional ratings
Aggregate scores
Source	Rating
Metacritic	82/100
Review scores
Source	Rating
Clash	8/10
The Independent	4/5 stars
The Irish Times	4/5 stars
Mixmag	8/10
Mojo	4/5 stars
NME	7/10
PopMatters	8/10

According to the review aggregator Metacritic, Golden Ticket received "universal acclaim" based on a weighted average score of 82 out of 100 from 6 critic scores.

Andy Gill of The Independent stated, "With copious assistance from multi-instrumentalist Shawn Lee, White creates slinky, rolling grooves incorporating everything from fretless bass to marimba and kalimba, over which Biddines delivers street sketches and epigrammatic non-sequiturs in a pithy, laid-back, dirty-South inflection." Jonathan Frahm of PopMatters commented that "Golden Rules might be able to make a record that's a little tighter and a little more in-your-face on their next go-around, but the fact that they have embraced an actual ability to relay important memories and lessons to the listener through their music is something that many of those in the current mainstream rap game can take a cue from."

=== Accolades ===
Year-end lists for Golden Ticket
Publication	List	Rank	Ref.
The Vinyl Factory	The 50 Best LPs of 2015	8	

== Track listing ==
All tracks are written by Eric Biddines and Paul Williams White, except where noted.

Golden Ticket track listing
No.	Title	Writer(s)	Length
1.	"Auntie Pearl's House"		3:05
2.	"The Let Down"		1:56
3.	"It's Over"		3:12
4.	"Don't Be"		3:06
5.	"Talkin' 'Bout"		3:09
6.	"Down South Boogie"	Biddines; Williams White; Marlon McClain	2:25
7.	"Never Die" (featuring Yasiin Bey)	Biddines; Williams White; J. Roode; D. Smith	4:43
8.	"Fogged Window"		2:59
9.	"Holy Macaroni"		3:03
10.	"Making a Move"		3:30
11.	"Play Some Luther"		4:08
12.	"Life's Power"		3:34
13.	"Golden Ticket"		3:20
Total length:			42:10

Bandcamp edition bonus track
No.	Title	Length
14.	"Never Die" (Paul White remix; featuring Freddie Gibbs and Yasiin Bey)	4:00
Total length:		46:10

== Personnel ==
Credits adapted from liner notes.

- Eric Biddines – vocals
- Paul White – instruments, production
- Shawn Lee – vocals (1, 2, 4, 6–8), bass guitar (1, 2, 4, 7, 8), nylon string guitar (1), percussion (1), guitar (2, 4, 6), Wurlitzer (2, 4, 7), additional drums (2, 6), glockenspiel (2), synthesizer (3, 4), marimba (3), kalimba (3), shells (3), piano (4, 6), drums (4, 7), electric guitar (8, 11), Hohner D6 Clavinet (8), Mellotron (8), finger clicks (8), tom drum (8), Fender Rhodes (11), mixing (1–4, 6–8, 11)
- Yasiin Bey – vocals (7)
- Jamie Woon – additional vocals (7)
- Ben Greenslade Stanton – trumpet (7), trombone (7)
- Nancy Elizabeth – additional vocals (8)
- Tenderlonious – saxophone (9)
- Mara Carlyle – vocals (11), saw (11)
- Pierre Duplan – engineering (1–4, 6–8, 11), mixing (1–4, 6–8, 11)
- Carim Clasmann – additional engineering (1–4, 6–8, 11)
- Nathan Boddy – mixing
- Noel Summerville – mastering
- ESPO – artwork
- DLT – layout

== Charts ==
Chart performance for Golden Ticket
Chart (2015)	Peak position
UK Official Record Store (OCC)	22
