= Hot Soup (mixtape) =

Mixtape by Danny Brown
- Released: July 1, 2008
- Genre: Hip-hop
- Length: 57:56
- Label: Self-released; Street Corner Music (re-release)
- Producer: Danny Brown; Nick Speed; (exec.)

Danny Brown chronology
Detroit State of Mind (2007)	Hot Soup (2008)	Detroit State of Mind 2 (2008)

Hot Soup is the second overall mixtape by American rapper Danny Brown. It was self released as a free digital download on July 1, 2008, by Brown, and brought success to his career, being considered to be a predecessor to The Hybrid. It contains features from Nick Speed, Rapper Big Pooh, O Dash, Kinesis, Lola Damone, Chip, Marv Won, and K-Fresh.

== Re-release and promotion ==
Originally released as a free digital download, in April 2014, Hot Soup was re-released as a double LP and 7-inch with 7 bonus tracks for Record Store Day. It was also released on CD with a bonus disc of instrumentals. Along with Hot Soup, Brown also released Old as a double LP and a box set. On March 25, 2014, Brown appeared The Arsenio Hall Show, where he promoted his third album Old and performed the single "Dip" from the album.

== Track listing ==
All music is composed by All tracks are produced by Nick Speed.

No.	Title	Length
1.	"Level One"	0:29
2.	"Dance"	3:21
3.	"What up Doe"	3:02
4.	"Ten G's a Week"	2:33
5.	"Sittin' so High"	3:14
6.	"Swagger to the Max"	2:36
7.	"Succeed (feat. Kineses)"	3:22
8.	"She Love It (feat. Nick Speed and Lola Damone)"	3:44
9.	"Head"	2:28
10.	"Squeeze Precisely (feat. Rapper Big Pooh and O Dash)"	3:08
11.	"Rese-Vor Dogs (feat. Mike Luke and Chip)"	2:03
12.	"Gun in Yo Mouf (feat. Chip and Marv Won)"	3:15
13.	"Let's Go"	2:29
14.	"Two Steps Back"	4:55
15.	"Work Song"	3:15
Total length:		57:56

Deluxe edition (Bonus tracks)
No.	Title	Length
16.	"Streets of Detroit"	2:05
17.	"Numbers"	1:45
18.	"Watch 'em"	2:38
19.	"Hot Soup Commercial"	2:22
20.	"Hot Soul Interview (feat. K-Fresh)"	5:01

== Personnel ==
=== Companies ===
- Manufactured By – Fat Beats Distribution
- Distributed By – Fat Beats Distribution
- Copyright © – Libido Sounds
- Copyright © – Nix Production
- Copyright © – Street Corner Music

=== Credits ===
- Art Direction – Danny Brown, Mario "Khalif" Butterfield, Nick Speed
- Executive-Producer – Danny Brown, Nick Speed
- Mixed By, Mastered By, Arranged By – Mike Wyatt, Nick Speed
- Photography By, Cover [Design] – Mario "Khalif" Butterfield
- Producer – Nick Speed
