= Bruiser Wolf =

American rapper

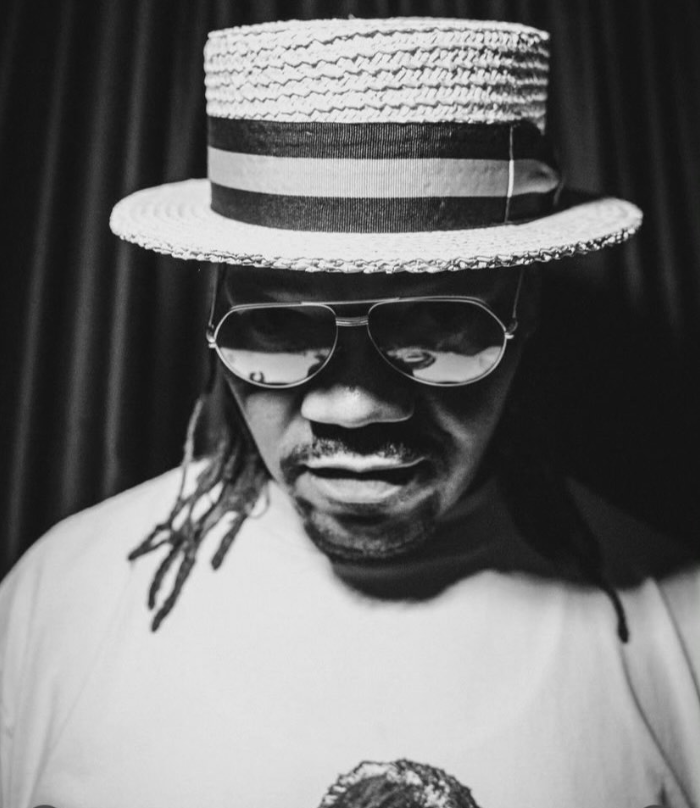
- Wolf in 2024

Background information
- Born: Detroit, Michigan, U.S.
- Genres: Alternative hip-hop; experimental hip-hop
- Occupations: Rapper; songwriter
- Labels: Bruiser House Entertainment; Fake Shore Drive
- Member of: Bruiser Brigade

Devaul Neal, known professionally as Bruiser Wolf, and formerly known as Big Wolf, is an American rapper from Detroit, Michigan.

== Career ==
Wolf is part of fellow Detroit rapper Danny Brown's label and collective Bruiser Brigade (a hip-hop collective featuring Brown, Chips, Dopehead, Trpl Blk, ZelooperZ, J.U.S, Fat Ray, along with in-house producers SKYWLKR, and Raphy, among others), under which he released his debut album, Dope Game Stupid, on March 29, 2021. The album was produced primarily by Bruiser Brigade in-house producer Raphy, with additional production credits given to Dream Beach (stylized as "dream beach") and Knxwledge. Pitchfork gave the album a 7.6/10, classifying the release as being "among [2021]'s most engaging rap albums so far." Wolf was featured on the Bruiser Brigade album TV62, released on May 14, 2021.

Wolf was featured with a verse on the song "Y.B.P." from Danny Brown's 2023 album Quaranta. The music video for the song features half-claymation/half-live action versions of Brown and Wolf, who narrate their shared experiences of growing up in Detroit.

Wolf's second album My Story Got Stories was released on January 12, 2024, on Bruiser Brigade Records. The album includes features by Danny Brown, Trinidad James, Stretch Money, Fat Ray, and Chris Crack. It was produced primarily by Raphy, with additional production credits given to Harry Fraud, Ejay Beatz, Greg Zola, DaG, Wizkiddxsillev, and SKYWLKR.

Wolf's third album, Potluck, was released on May 30, 2025, by Fake Shore Drive. It features production from Knxwledge, Harry Fraud, Nicholas Craven, Sango, Squadda B, F1lthy, Danny G Beats, among others. It features guest appearances by Sir Michael Rocks, DJ Lucas, and Fat Ray. It was followed by two collaborative albums: Made by Dope with Harry Fraud on October 22, 2025, and Push & Paint with Sheefy Mcfly on March 13, 2026.

=== Name change ===
Bruiser Wolf was once known as Big Wolf, but he later tweaked his name to show appreciation for his labelmates and fellow rappers. In an interview with Uproxx, he explains: "I used to be Big Wolf. Changed it when I got with the Bruiser Brigade (...) to let them know that this (is) forever, I put 'Bruiser' in front of my name, like a badge of honor for me, to express my loyalty."

== Discography ==
=== Studio albums ===
- Dope Game Stupid (2021)
- My Story Got Stories (2024)
- Potluck (2025)
- Made by Dope (with Harry Fraud) (2025)
- Push & Paint (with Sheefy Mcfly) (2026)
- The Dealer Wins (with Conductor Williams) (2026)
