= Buzzcut (song) =

2021 single by Brockhampton featuring Danny Brown

Single by Brockhampton featuring Danny Brown

from the album Roadrunner: New Light, New Machine
- Released: March 24, 2021
- Genre: Psychedelic rap
- Length: 3:21
- Label: RCA; Question Everything
- Songwriters: Ian Simpson; Imondre Goss; Daniel Sewell; Russell Boring; Romil Hemnani; Jabari Manwarring; Jared Scharff; Jeremy Ruzumna; Joseph Karnes; Stephen Feigenbaum; Vasant Sundaresan
- Producers: Video Store; Jabari Manwa; Queen Sixties; Johan Lenox; Joba

Brockhampton singles chronology
"Sugar" (2020)	"Buzzcut" (2021)	"Count On Me" (2021)

Danny Brown singles chronology
"3 Tearz" (2019)	"Buzzcut" (2021)	"Lean Beef Patty" (2023)

Music video
- "Buzzcut" on YouTube

"Buzzcut" (stylized in all caps) is a song by American hip hop boy band Brockhampton, released on March 24, 2021 as the lead single from their sixth studio album Roadrunner: New Light, New Machine (2021). It features American rapper Danny Brown.

== Composition ==
"Buzzcut" features muted loops of sirens and reverberating bass. Kevin Abstract reflects on matters related to his family and Brockhampton's rise to prominence, hinting at Ameer Vann's departure from the band due to sexual misconduct allegations. Danny Brown performs in strained vocals, rapping about incels and mentioning Abbey Road. Later on, the production decrescendos into a saxophone accompaniment for soft vocals. The song also features background vocals from Jabari Manwa, and Merlyn Wood plays the role of hype man.

== Critical reception ==
The song was well-received by music critics. Robin Murray of Clash called it a "dynamite return, one that ripples with a barely contained sense of energy" and remarked that "The production has a day-glo quality, while Danny Brown's electrifying guest turn sends BROCKHAMPTON to another level." Eli Enis of Entertainment Weekly stated, "'Buzzcut' isn't any more focused than their past joints, but the arrangement is more interesting than awkward. Fellow experimental renegade Danny Brown also makes an appearance, but even he has trouble navigating the song's psychedelic landscape. That's not a diss to Danny, it's a testament to Brockhampton's singular sonic world." Paste's Candace McDuffie wrote the song "kicks off things with a hearty vehemence against rip-roaring production and dangerously accurate one-liners from Abstract like, 'A platinum record not gon' keep my Black ass out of jail.' Danny Brown's quirkiness perfectly aligns with the bombast of the track—the way he contorts his voice to match the energy of any given song has always been his strongest asset." Will Richards of NME commented the song "sees Danny Brown doing what Danny Brown does so well, bringing untameable, frenetic energy." DIY's Elly Watson described the song as "attention-grabbing". Vijai Kumar Singh of Exclaim! stated the song "best typifies the chaos" throughout Roadrunner: New Light, New Machine. Pitchfork's Matthew Strauss praised Kevin Abstract's performance, writing he "threads his colorful rapping with evocative mini-scenes".

== Music video ==
The music video was released alongside the single. Directed by Dan Streit with creative direction from Kevin Abstract, it has been described as "chaotic" and features saturated colors and animated backdrops. In the beginning, Brockhampton cruises in a car as the surrounding landscape morphs. They are also seen wrestling each other along with Danny Brown, puking green slime, and fleeing in terror from Brown when he transforms into a monster.

== Charts ==
Chart performance for "Buzzcut"
Chart (2021)	Peak position
New Zealand Hot Singles (RMNZ)	28
