= Quaranta (album) =

Studio album by Danny Brown
- Released: November 17, 2023
- Length: 34:23
- Label: Warp
- Producers: The Alchemist; Quelle Chris; Skywlkr; Kaelin Ellis; Holly; Sven Wunder; Kassa Overall; Paul White

Danny Brown chronology
Scaring the Hoes (2023)	Quaranta (2023)	Stardust (2025)

Singles from Quaranta
- 1. "Tantor" Released: October 17, 2023; 2. "Jenn's Terrific Vacation" Released: November 14, 2023; 3. "Dark Sword Angel" Released: September 24, 2024

Quaranta is the fifth studio album by American rapper Danny Brown, released on November 17, 2023, by Warp Records. It is Brown's solo follow-up to 2019's U Know What I'm Sayin?, and his second album of 2023 following his collaboration with JPEGMafia, Scaring the Hoes. The album includes collaborations with Bruiser Wolf, Kassa Overall and Mike, and was preceded by the lead single "Tantor".

== Background ==
Brown first teased the album in October 2020 when he shared a clip of music with the caption "XXXX". He later clarified it was titled Quaranta and not 40. The title means "40" in Italian, and has been described as a "spiritual bookend" to Brown's 2011 album XXX. Brown worked with producers including the Alchemist, Quelle Chris, Skywlkr and Paul White on the album.

Brown has called it his "most personal" album, on which he "explor[es] his experiences with pain, isolation, and hitting rock bottom". He called it his "way of getting shit out" after spending time in rehab to recover from drug and alcohol addiction, and explained that "it was almost like, if I died, this is what I have to say".

== Critical reception ==
Professional ratings
Aggregate scores
Source	Rating
AnyDecentMusic?	7.6/10
Metacritic	82/100
Review scores
Source	Rating
AllMusic	4.5/5 stars
And It Don't Stop	A−
Exclaim!	9/10
HipHopDX	4.5/5
The Line of Best Fit	9/10
Mojo	4/5 stars
MusicOMH	4/5 stars
Paste	8.5/10
Pitchfork	6.5/10
Uncut	8/10

Quaranta received a score of 82 out of 100 on review aggregator Metacritic based on 16 critics' reviews, indicating "universal acclaim". Editors at Stereogum chose this for Album of the Week, with critic Tom Breihan writing that "if you listen to the last five Danny Brown albums in sequence, it sounds like an absolute model of graceful aging within rap [...] so Quaranta feels like a time-capsule portrait of a great rapper teetering on the edge of oblivion" and he considered it "expansive enough to get lost in".

Exclaim!'s Nicholas Sokic wrote that "Brown brings a depth of introspection—and a healthy dose of friction—to the well-worn idea" of "music-as-lifeline", which Sokic felt allows Brown to "min[e] an autobiographical clarity not present to the same degree in previous projects", remarking that he is "just a little less wild and a whole lot wiser" and "better for it". Reviewing the album for Rolling Stone, Mosi Reeves stated that the "last five songs on Quaranta feel like a AAA (sic) session defined by confessions and naked vulnerability", concluding that it is "no matter if his fans embrace this newly restrained alt-rap hero or not," as "it's better to be alive and underrated than glorified and dead".

Mehan Jayasuriya of Pitchfork found that "on the more diaristic songs, the narratives aren't as vivid, the rapping isn't as nimble, and the songs lack momentum" and its "bright spots aren't enough to lift the album out of its dour funk. Growth can be awkward, and for better or worse, Quaranta feels like an apt reflection of this process". Assessing the album for AllMusic, Fred Thomas concluded that, "It's not entirely the same rowdy, lascivious joyriding that made up some of his celebrated early work, but the album's fearless expression of a full emotional spectrum makes it remarkable and at times shatteringly beautiful."

== Track listing ==
Quaranta track listing
No.	Title	Writer(s)	Producer(s)	Length
1.	"Quaranta"	Daniel Sewell; Miguel Oliveira	Holly	2:40
2.	"Tantor"	Sewell; Baird Acheson; Gabriel Acheson; Alan Maman; Ryan Raines	The Alchemist	2:28
3.	"Ain't My Concern"	Sewell; Christian DeVivo; Kassa Overall; Gavin Tennille	Chris Keys; Quelle Chris; Overall^{[c]}	2:51
4.	"Dark Sword Angel"	Sewell; DeVivo; Tennille	Chris Keys; Quelle Chris	2:40
5.	"Y.B.P." (featuring Bruiser Wolf)	Sewell; Devaul Neal; Overall; Skylar Tait	Skywlkr; Overall	2:56
6.	"Jenn's Terrific Vacation" (featuring Kassa Overall)	Sewell; Overall	Overall	3:27
7.	"Down wit It"	Sewell; Paul White	White	2:41
8.	"Celibate" (featuring Mike)	Sewell; Samuel Baker; Michael Bonema; Overall	Samiyam; Overall	3:59
9.	"Shakedown"	Sewell; Kaelin Ellis	Ellis	3:29
10.	"Hanami"	Sewell; Joel Danell	Sven Wunder	3:27
11.	"Bass Jam"	Sewell; White	White	3:44
Total length:				34:23

Deluxe edition
No.	Title	Length
1.	"Cheaters"	2:10
2.	"Keep It to Me"	3:10
3.	"Tantor" (instrumental)	2:28
4.	"Jenn's Terrible Vacation" (instrumental)	3:26
5.	"Y.B.P." (instrumental)	2:54
6.	"Dark Sword Angel" (instrumental)	2:40

Notes

- ^{^[c]} signifies a co-producer.
- "Shakedown" features additional vocals by Zelooperz and Paul "Cowboy Killer" Mifsud Jr.

== Charts ==
Chart performance for Quaranta
Chart (2023–2024)	Peak position
Scottish Albums (Official Charts)	14
UK Album Downloads (Official Charts)	40
UK Independent Albums (Official Charts)	9
UK R&B Albums (Official Charts)	1
