= Eric Biddines =

Eric Biddines Eric Lamar Biddines
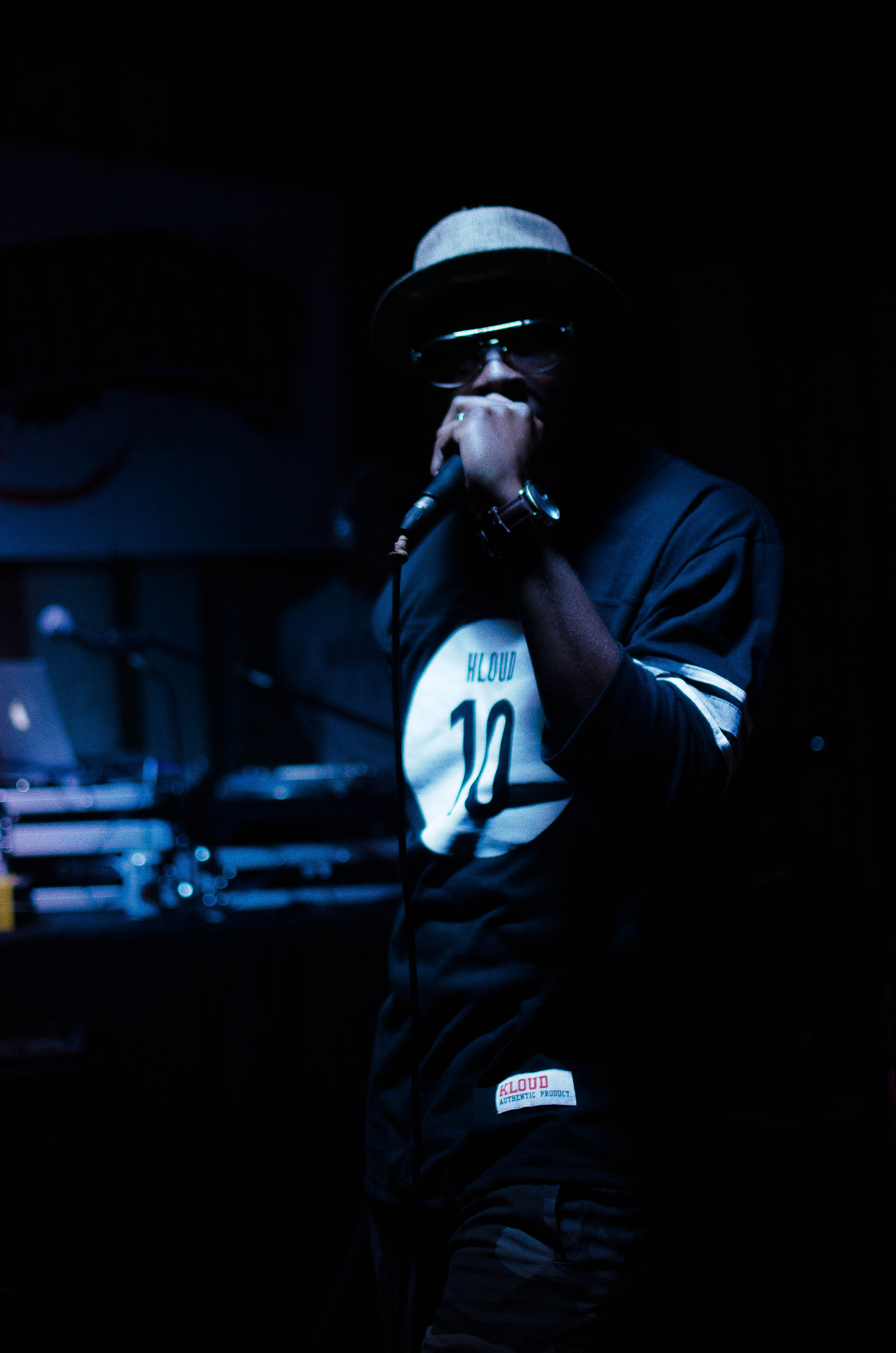
- Biddines at SXSW in 2014

Background information
- Born: Ocala, Florida
- Origin: Delray Beach, Florida
- Genres: Rap, funk, R&B
- Occupations: Rapper, singer, lyricist, record producer
- Instrument: D.A.W.
- Years active: 2009–present
- Labels: planetcoffeebean, Juggernaut Sound Productions, Empire Distribution
- Website: EricBiddines.com

Eric Biddines (born Ocala, Florida) is an American rapper, vocalist, and record producer based in Palm Beach, Florida. He has released several albums on his label planetcoffeebean, and in 2010 was nominated for Independent Artist of the Year at the Palm Beach Hip Hop Awards. His most recent album, The Local Cafe, was released in 2017, with the music video for the track "Railroads Down/Unfished" released to MTV2 and MTV Jams in April 2014. He has released several other music videos as well. BET wrote that Biddines' music "demonstrates a Dungeon Family-like propensity for interweaving harmonious refrains into complex flows to create a sound that sandwiches pure hip hop with layerings of funk and R&B."

== Early life ==
Eric Biddines was born in the city of Ocala, Florida. At the age of six he moved to Delray Beach, Florida in Palm Beach County, where he was raised by his mother in a strict religious Jehovah's Witness household. At a young age he and his three siblings listened to modern R&B and early Motown artists such as Al Green and Luther Vandross. He also listened to hip hop at a young age. As a teenager he was inspired to change his lifestyle by lyrics in the OutKast album ATLiens, where Andre 3000 raps "No drugs or alcohol so I can get the signal clear." Recollected Biddines, when he first heard the lyrics "I was 13 and I grew up in the projects, like government assistance. Being bad was the cool thing so when Andre said that at a time when the South was struggling to establish an identity, it just threw me off and inspired me so much that — not that I was supposed to at 13 — but I haven't gotten into any of those activities ever since."

== Music career ==
=== 2009-13: First releases ===
In 2009 Biddines released the music video for his track "Walkin'." He released his first solo mixtape, DaCoffeeShop, in 2010. The album was self-released on his own label planetcoffeebean. About the creation of his label and narrative world of his lyrics, in 2013 Biddines stated that "Planet Coffee Bean is an escape. I like to believe when my followers see me or play my music, it gives them an out-of-body experience. Like, I'm branding landmarks and characters throughout my projects, and there's themes that help you bring the mental aspect into this physical world." After the release of DaCoffeeShop, in 2010 he was nominated independent Artist of the Year at the Palm Beach Hip Hop Awards. That year he also released his full-length debut, titled FLA Alien: Planet Coffee Bean. Stated the New Times, the album "formulated an alternative lifestyle, all revolving around a brewed cup of java."

He released the mixtape Aye Story About Love in 2011, which the New Times called "a neosoul, introspective effort that delved into all the trappings of romance." On April 27, 2012 he released the EP The Frozen Lake, on his own label planetcoffeebean. He performs periodically in Florida, and in March 2013 he opened for Solillaquists of Sound at Speakeasy Lounge.

=== 2013-14: Planetcoffeebean 2 and music videos ===
His fifth album, Planetcoffeebean 2, was released independently in 2013. He stated that Planet Coffee Bean 2 was likely his "most flexible and well-balanced album." He worked on the songs for two years, recording around fifty songs and focusing for months on the artwork. The final cut included twelve tracks.

External videos
- Eric Biddines - "Walkin" Official Video (July 16, 2009)
- Eric Biddines RAILROADS DOWN/UNFINISHED "Official Music Video" (April 2014)

Biddines has released several official music videos. In April 2014 his video "Message in a Bottle" premiered on Complex.com, and his video for "Railroad Down/Unfinished", a track first included on Planetcoffeebean 2, was exclusively released on HipHopDX on April 14, 2014. MTV Jams put "Railroads Down/Unfinished" in heavy rotation in April, and it also premiered on MTV2.

Biddine's friend Ryan Synder, who has worked on videos for Maybach Music Group and Dre Films, directed the film for "Railroad Down/Unfinished". The music video takes the form of a narrative, with Biddines' character enslaved on a Southern plantation. A number of other characters take part, with Biddines doing his own stunts. Biddines had come up with the setting for the video before finishing the song in 2013, stating "I wanted to make a beat that sounds like it was being created live. Like, whatever was going on in the surroundings also went on in the music. So you could kind of hear the steps and the crickets or whatever the case may be. I needed to pick a setting and place that [had] those same things."

In 2014 after performing at SXSW he partnered with Richie Abbott of Strange Music, working with his Juggernaut Sound imprint in association with Empire Distribution to re-release planetcoffeebean 2. The new "deluxe" edition features five new songs. Together he and producer Paul White form the hip hop duo Golden Rules. They released their debut Golden Ticket in 2015.

== Style and equipment ==
Jake Rohn of BET wrote in 2014 that Biddines' music "demonstrates a Dungeon Family-like propensity for interweaving harmonious refrains into complex flows to create a sound that sandwiches pure hip hop with layerings of funk and R&B". HipHopDX writes that Biddines has a "deep Southern sound that's at times as soulful as it is fervent — and an introspective nature that allows him to expertly use a cup of coffee as a metaphor for the daily grind".

About Planetcoffeebean 2 Hilly Dilly positively compared him to Andre 3000 for his ability to both rap and sing well, while also complimenting his individual take on Southern rap. Biddines has stated that "I grew up on the Dungeon Family, Cee Lo, Goodie Mob, OutKast, Devin the Dude — a lot of Southern music, but something the artists I just mentioned have in common is they're different. I'm not gonna do what everybody around me is doing —so my direction was to be consciously different." About his own genre, Biddines has stated that "I probably do like 25 percent R&B 'cause it's just so you get a little taste, and not so much that I'm overdoing it 'cause I'm still primarily in the rap category. If you sing too much it becomes boring, but if I give you like 75 percent rap and sing just as flawlessly then you look at it like, 'Whoa, he can spit but his melodic side sounds too good.'"

== Awards and nominations ==
Year	Award	Nominated work	Category	Result
2010	Palm Beach Hip Hop Awards	Eric Biddines	Independent Artist of the Year	Nominated

== Discography ==
=== Albums ===
Albums by Eric Biddines
Year	Album title	Release details
2010	DaCoffeeShop	Released: 2010; Label: planetcoffeebean; Format: Digital
2010	FLAlien:planetcoffeebean	Released: Nov 18, 2010; Label: planetcoffeebean; Format: Digital
2011	Southern Fla	Released: Nov 11, 2011; Label: planetcoffeebean; Format: Digital
2013	planetcoffeebean 2	Released: Oct 07, 2014 (deluxe ed.); Label: Juggernaut Sound Productions; Format: Digital
2017	The Local Cafe	Released: April 2017; Label:planetcoffeebean; Format: Digital
2018	Toilet Tissue	Released: July 23, 2018; Label:planetcoffeebean; Format: Digital

=== EPs ===
EPs by Eric Biddines
Year	Album title	Release details
2011	Ayestoryaboutlove	Released: Mar 5, 2011; Label: planetcoffeebean; Format: Digital
2012	The Frozen Lake	Released: Apr 27, 2012; Label: planetcoffeebean; Format: Digital

=== Singles ===
Incomplete list of songs by Eric Biddines
Year	Title	Album	Release details
2009	"Walkin'"	Single only	Music video
2011	"M.L.W.J.C."	Single Only	planetcoffeebean; Apr 18, 2011
2012	"Southern Fla"	Promo Single	planetcoffeebean; Jan 5, 2012
2012	"Coffee Cup"	Single Only	planetcoffeebean; Aug 24, 2012
2012	"Nameless"	Single Only	A3C/iH2D/iHipHop Distribution; Dec 18, 2012
2013	"Railroads Down/Unfinished"	planetcoffeebean 2	Juggernaut Sound; April 14

=== Guest appearances ===
Selected songs featuring Eric Biddines
Year	Single name	Primary artist(s)	Album	Label
2013	"Push" (ft. Eric Biddines)	J.O.B 9-5	Single only	YOUKNOWE.ENT; Apr 30, 2013
2015	"Breaking Up" (ft. Deniece Williams & Eric Biddines)	Bobby Caldwell & Jack Splash	Cool Uncle	Fresh Young Minds; Nov 13, 2015

== See also ==
- List of American rappers
