= K'Jon =

American singer

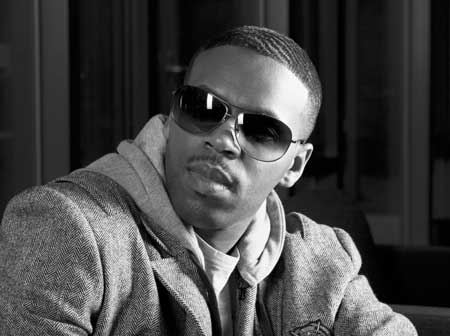

Background information
- Born: Kelvin Johnson
- Origin: Detroit, Michigan
- Genres: Contemporary R&B, pop
- Occupations: Singer, songwriter
- Instrument: Vocals
- Years active: 2002–present
- Label: Universal Republic

Kelvin Johnson, better known by his stage name K'Jon, is an R&B singer whose 2009 solo debut album, I Get Around, reached number one on the R&B charts. The lead single from the album, "On the Ocean", hit number one on the Urban AC Radio charts and number 12 on Billboard's R&B charts. His second album Moving On was released in 2012.

== Discography ==
=== Studio albums ===
Year	Title	Chart positions			Certifications
Year	Title	US	U.S. R&B	U.S. TM	Certifications
2009	I Get Around: First studio album; Released: August 22, 2009; Universal Republic		87	116	
2012	Moving On: Second studio album; Released: April 17, 2012; Shanachie Entertainment	-	39	-	

=== Singles ===
Year	Title	Chart positions			Album
Year	Title	US	U.S. R&B	U.S. UAC	Album
2009	On the Ocean: Released: June 13, 2009; Universal Republic	96	12	1	I Get Around
2009	This Time: Released: August 4, 2009; Universal Republic	-	68	-	I Get Around
2011	Will You Be There: Released: December 22, 2011; Shanachie Entertainment	-	80	-	Moving On

K'Jon & Seven the General

K'Jon and Seven the General first worked together on the Universal Music Group No. 1 Billboard album "I Get Around" composing the song "On Everything". Soon, after the success of the collaboration the two would co-write and craft a mixtape together entitled "the Detroit Connect" for the 2010 All Star game in Dallas mainly produced by Nick Speed and featuring "I Get it In". The song also appears on Seven the General's "the Sanctum Sanctorum" album and went on to win "What's Next on the Menu" on clear channel's FM 98 WJLB.

Released by Shanichie/Koch the "Moving On" LP features the two again for "On Everything pt.2" & "I Get it in" the Rock Version ft. Seven the General and the Takeover band.

Set in 1938 and directed by Darren Brown, K'Jon & Seven the General star in "Dancing Shoes" a fictional film about conflict between "Chicago Steppers & Detroit Ballroomers" and In 2011 K'Jon's Up & Up records hired Seven the General as an Executive Producer & Consultant to the labels Rap-Hip Hop division where Seven has co-wrote and composed for the K'jon featured group "Bloc Boiz" K'Jon 's "MAN" album also features "Seven the General" on the song "Caught Up" released on Up & Up Records.

Collaborations:

- K'Jon – "On Everything" featuring Seven the General (I Get Around 2009 Universal)
- Seven the General – featuring "I Get it In" produced by Nick Speed (the Sanctum Sanctorum 2010)
- K'Jon – "I'm the Boss" featuring Seven the General & Lady Tee (K'Jon presents Nick Speed and the Detroit Connect 2010 Up & Up)
- K'Jon – "The Re-Takeover" – featuring Seven the General & X.L. (K'Jon presents Nick Speed and the Detroit Connect 2010 Up & Up)
- K'Jon – "I'm Sorry ft. L Renee & Seven the General (K'Jon presents Nick Speed and the Detroit Connect 2010 Up & Up)
- Seven the General – "I Got Bread" featuring K'Jon & Bloc Boiz (Stars & Stripes the Elian Gonzolez story 2011)
- K'Jon – "On Everything pt. 2" – featuring Seven the General (Moving On 2012 Shanichie)
- K'jon – "Caught Up" featuring Seven the General (Man 2013 Up & Up)
