= Count On Me (Brockhampton song) =

2021 single by Brockhampton

Single by Brockhampton featuring ASAP Rocky, SoGone SoFlexy, Ryan Beatty and Shawn Mendes

from the album Roadrunner: New Light, New Machine
- Released: April 2, 2021
- Length: 2:35
- Label: RCA; Question Everything
- Songwriters: Rakim Mayers; Jabari Manwarring; Ryan Beatty; Ian Simpson; Matthew Champion; Russell Boring; Dalvin Serino; Romil Hemnani; Jared Scharff; Jeremy Ruzumna; Joseph Karnes
- Producers: Jabari Manwa; Video Store; Queen Sixties

Brockhampton singles chronology
"Buzzcut" (2021)	"Count On Me" (2021)	"Hollywood Swinging" (2021)

ASAP Rocky singles chronology
"Mazza" (2021)	"Count On Me" (2021)	"Stoozy" (2021)

SoGone SoFlexy singles chronology
"Heard the Opps Out" (2020)	"Count On Me" (2021)	"Big Wide Body" (2021)

Ryan Beatty singles chronology
"Downside" (2020)	"Count On Me" (2021)	"Sierra Nights" (2021)

Shawn Mendes singles chronology
"Monster" (2020)	"Count On Me" (2021)	"Kesi (Remix)" (2021)

Music video
- "Count On Me" on YouTube

"Count On Me" (stylized in all caps) is a song by American hip hop boy band Brockhampton, released on April 2, 2021 as the second single from their sixth studio album Roadrunner: New Light, New Machine (2021). It features uncredited vocals from American rappers ASAP Rocky and SoGone SoFlexy, American singer Ryan Beatty and Canadian singer Shawn Mendes.

== Composition ==
The instrumental of the song uses a whistle. ASAP Rocky raps the opening verse, in which he references the song "Sick of Being Lonely" by Field Mob. Ryan Beatty and Shawn Mendes provide vocals in the chorus. SoGone SoFlexy and Matt Champion perform the second and third verses respectively.

On Twitter, Kevin Abstract described the song as having "Summer time vibes. Ride around with the windows down with ya best friend singing super loud to the chorus type vibe – shows the other side of the album."

== Music video ==
An official music video premiered on April 13, 2021. Directed by Kevin Abstract and Dan Streit, it stars singers Lil Nas X and Dominic Fike as romantic lovers, opening with them driving down a road in the countryside in a Jeep as they converse about musical tastes. Fike says he listens to Radiohead, which Nas makes a joke about. They blast the song through the car's speakers. By nightfall, they travel into a quiet and secluded forest, where they stroll through and explore the area as they are surrounded by thick trees under the moonlight, reaching a river while lightning flashes overhead. The pair soon have a drug-fueled hallucinatory experience, turning into computer-animated versions of themselves as well as warped, rubbery figures, and encounter some spooky creatures. The song stops early as the two kiss passionately on the river bank and make out, embracing topless in the creek before sinking. The visual ends with their animated nude bodies intertwining until they become one form.

== Charts ==
Chart performance for "Count On Me"
Chart (2021)	Peak position
New Zealand Hot Singles (RMNZ)	10
