= Twitch EP =

EP by Danny Brown
- Released: August 28, 2018
- Genre: Hip-hop
- Length: 28:57

Danny Brown chronology
Atrocity Exhibition (2016)	Twitch EP (2018)	U Know What I'm Sayin? (2019)

Reign Supreme (also known as Twitch EP) is the second solo extended play by American rapper Danny Brown. It was released on August 28, 2018 on DatPiff and features songs that Danny Brown played on his Twitch stream in the month of August 2018. The mixtape features uncredited guest appearances from Bruiser Brigade members ZelooperZ, Dopehead, Fat Ray and Kash Tha Kushman.

== Background ==
In July 2014, Danny Brown announced that his group Bruiser Brigade would release their debut album, tentatively titled Reign Supreme in October of that year. In a March 2015 interview, when asked about how far completed the album was, Dopehead replied "A heart beat". The album never released.

Danny Brown started streaming on Twitch the Japanese role-playing video game Persona 5 on August 24, 2018. Clips of the Persona 5 streams got attention on Twitter and brought more viewers to his stream. He streamed more Persona 5 the following day, then turned the stream into a live listening party of 12 unreleased songs. He went on to clarify that "This shit ain't coming out, it's only for Twitch" and joked around saying it was the "first Twitch album ever". He said that the songs he previewed were not songs from his new album and that none of the samples had been cleared.

Professional ratings
Review scores
Source	Rating
HipHopDX	4.0/5
Stereogum	favorable
Pitchfork	7.4/10

== Track listing ==
No.	Title	Length
1.	"Funeral Lines"	3:18
2.	"Dreams"	3:03
3.	"Space Trip"	2:46
4.	"Nightmares"	2:20
5.	"Cut It Up"	3:39
6.	"Toxic"	2:45
7.	"8 Ball Flow"	3:36
8.	"Out My Mind"	3:47
9.	"Choppa Choppa"	3:23
