= Shareif Ziyadat =

American photographer (born 1980)

Shareif Ziyadat (born September 23, 1980) is a celebrity photographer and artist. His interest in creative arts lead him to pursue a career in photography and graphic imagery. Shareif later graduated with a degree from the School of Visual Arts located in New York City and is the recipient of numerous advertising industry awards including the prestigious Clio, ADNY Awards, Graphics, and recognition from the Art Directors Club.

== Photographic career ==
Shareif Ziyadat founded Shareif Ziyadat Productions, an art production company. The company is known for shooting editorials, creating album packaging, and developing global advertising campaigns.

== Notable clients ==
Shareif has a client base that includes individual celebrities, beverages, record labels, fashion, and automobiles. He has knowledge and experience working for spirit brands such as Hennessy, Hennessy Black, Stoli, Bacardi, Grey Goose, and P. Diddy's Ciroc. He has also worked for such brands/campaigns as Rocawear, Cherry Coke ads for Jay-Z, GMC campaign with Mary J. Blige and Lexus with Alicia Keys. He also photographed and art directed campaigns for Russell Simmons Argyle Culture, Degree ad with Ashley Tisdale, and an ABC special with Britney Spears. Shareif is the personal photographer for P. Diddy, 50 Cent, and Jay-Z.

Shareif Ziyadat Productions clients include:

1. 50 Cent
2. P. Diddy
3. Black Eyed Peas
4. Wyclef Jean
5. Kevin Durant
6. Swizz Beatz
7. Alicia Keys
8. Stephon Marbury's clothing line Starbury
9. Bad Boy Records
10. G-Unit
11. Interscope Records
12. Atlantic Records

Shareif has been featured as a subject himself in the 2010 Akademiks ad, MTV, VH1, and Bravo. His work has been published worldwide through many mainstream magazines. Shareif also is contracted by Cyclops Production, which is owned by Albert Watson and Mike Jurkavac and at Shelter as a Creative Director/Consultant.
