= Lean Beef Patty =

2023 single by JPEGMafia and Danny Brown

Single by JPEGMafia and Danny Brown

from the album Scaring the Hoes
- Released: March 13, 2023
- Genre: Hip hop; alternative hip hop
- Length: 1:48
- Songwriters: Barrington Hendricks; Daniel Dewan Sewell
- Producer: JPEGMafia

JPEGMafia singles chronology
"Dirt" (2022)	"Lean Beef Patty" (2023)	"Scaring the Hoes" (2023)

Danny Brown singles chronology
"Buzzcut" (2021)	"Lean Beef Patty" (2023)	"Scaring the Hoes" (2023)

"Lean Beef Patty" is a song by the American rappers JPEGMafia and Danny Brown. It was released as the lead single from the duo's 2023 collaborative album Scaring the Hoes on March 13, 2023. The song features sole production from JPEGMafia and was released alongside a music video.

The song was released to positive reception from critics, who praised the experimental production from JPEGMafia, as well as the chemistry between JPEGMafia and Brown.

== Background ==
A collaborative album from JPEGMafia and Danny Brown was announced in 2022, following a Smoker's Club Fest performance by the two. On January 15, 2023, JPEGMafia shared images of Brown and himself working in the studio via Twitter and revealed that the first single from the album would be released in the same year. In episode 43 of The Danny Brown Show podcast (aired February 28, 2023), Brown invited JPEGMafia on the show to talk about the album, where they previewed the what would eventually become "Lean Beef Patty". The song was released on March 13, alongside a music video.

The song title is a reference to popular online fitness creator LeanBeefPatty.

== Composition and themes ==
"Lean Beef Patty" is an experimental hip hop song, influenced by industrial music. JPEGMafia's verse on the track features several name drops of controversial figures, including Elon Musk, Papa John, Hulk Hogan, and Kanye West. His verse has been described as chaotic and abrasive. Brown's verse was considered energetic by reviewers, but with less strength than that of JPEGMafia.

The song is composed around a sample of the song "I Need a Girl (Part Two)" by American rapper Diddy, which leads into strong synths and bass drums.

== Reception ==
"Lean Beef Patty" received positive reviews from critics, who praised the production of the song as well as the chemistry between JPEGMafia and Danny Brown.
