= Tantor (song) =

2023 single by Danny Brown

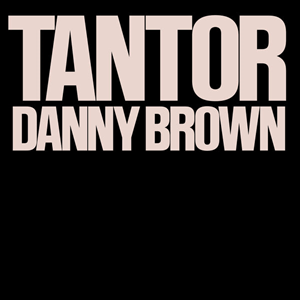

Single by Danny Brown

from the album Quaranta
- Released: October 17, 2023
- Genre: Hip hop
- Length: 2:28
- Composers: Alan Maman; Baird Acheson; Daniel Dewan Sewell; Gabriel Acheson; Ryan Raines
- Producer: The Alchemist

Danny Brown singles chronology
"Scaring the Hoes" (2023)	"Tantor" (2023)	"Jenn’s Terrific Vacation" (2023)

"Tantor" is a song by American rapper Danny Brown, released as the lead single from his sixth studio album, Quaranta. The song was released on October 17, 2023, through Warp Records. The song was produced by the Alchemist and composed with him alongside Brown, Baird Acheson, Gabriel Acheson, and Ryan Raines. "Tantor" was released alongside a music video.

== Background ==
In March 2023, Brown collaborated with American rapper JPEGMafia on their album Scaring the Hoes. On March 28, 2023, Brown confirmed on his podcast that Scaring the Hoes was a way for him to release music while his own album, Quaranta, was "caught up in label purgatory". Further explaining, he claimed that he had turned in the album "two weeks ago" and its release was being held up his manager and Warp Records. On October 17, 2023, Brown released the "Tantor" as the lead single alongside a music video and the tracklist for Quaranta.

== Music video ==
In the video, Brown evokes the lyric "cyborg with vocal cords" from "Tantor". The Rolling Stone described the "surreal" video as featuring the rapper "walking around the city wearing satellites, keyboards, and electrical supplies — like a makeshift Power Ranger."
