= The Hybrid (album) =

2010 album by Danny Brown

Studio album by Danny Brown
- Released: March 16, 2010
- Recorded: 2009–2010
- Genre: Alternative hip-hop
- Length: 46:38
- Label: Rappers I Know; Hybrid Music (Deluxe Edition)
- Producer: Quelle Chris; Danny!; Mosel; 14KT; Chuck Inglish; Denmark Vessey; Frank Dukes; Mainframe; Nick Speed; Slopfunkdust; Beat Butcha; brandUn DeShay

Danny Brown chronology
| Detroit State of Mind 4 (2010) | The Hybrid (2010) | Hawaiian Snow (2010) |

Professional ratings
Review scores
| Source | Rating |
|---|---|
| Pitchfork | 7.6/10 |
| PopMatters | 8/10 stars |
| RapReviews | 8.5/10 |

The Hybrid is the debut studio album by American rapper Danny Brown, released March 16, 2010. It was released as a free download on the bandcamp of label Rappers I Know.

== Background ==
The album, which was preceded by a number of free mixtapes, was also released as a free download, by Washington, DC record label Rappers I Know. The label later published the album on vinyl. A deluxe edition of the album was released for sale on Amazon on January 18, 2011, and later on iTunes on February 8, 2011, via Hybrid Music.

== Reception ==
This music collective is what led Fool's Gold founder Nick Catchdubs, to sign Danny Brown to his indie record label. The album received critical acclaim, with critics highly praising Brown's unique rapping style and the album's production.

== Track listing ==
| No. | Title | Producer(s) | Length |
|---|---|---|---|
| 1. | "Greatest Rapper Ever" | Quelle | 2:48 |
| 2. | "Need Another Drink" | Mainframe | 2:54 |
| 3. | "New Era" | Nick Speed | 4:53 |
| 4. | "Exotic" (featuring Dopehead) | Danny! | 2:21 |
| 5. | "I'm Out" | Chuck Inglish | 2:53 |
| 6. | "Re-Up" | Quelle | 2:09 |
| 7. | "Nowhere 2 Go" | Denmark Vessey | 2:56 |
| 8. | "Shootin' Moves" | Frank Dukes | 2:45 |
| 9. | "The Nana Song" | Danny! | 2:33 |
| 10. | "Guitar Solo" | Quelle | 3:44 |
| 11. | "White Stripes" | Quelle | 2:29 |
| 12. | "Juno" | Mosel | 2:14 |
| 13. | "Thank God" | Mosel | 2:51 |
| 14. | "Drinks on Me" | Quelle | 3:03 |
| 15. | "Generation Rx" | 14KT | 3:10 |
| 16. | "S.O.S" | Slopfunkdust | 2:54 |
| Total length: | | | 46:38 |

Deluxe edition (Bonus tracks)
| No. | Title | Producer(s) | Length |
|---|---|---|---|
| 17. | "Cartier" | 14KT | 3:04 |
| 18. | "Great Granddad" | Beat Butcha | 3:08 |
| 19. | "Lincoln Continental" | brandUn DeShay | 2:58 |
| Total length: | | | 55:48 |

== The Hybrid: Cutting Room Floor ==
The Hybrid: Cutting Room Floor is a mixtape composed of songs that didn't make it onto the final album.

The Hybrid: Cutting Room Floor

Mixtape by Danny Brown
- Released: March 15, 2010
- Recorded: 2009-2010
- Genre: Alternative hip-hop
- Length: 44:18

It contains features from Marv Won, Dopehead and Fatt Father

| No. | Title | Length |
|---|---|---|
| 1. | "8 Mile" | 2:29 |
| 2. | "Just Chil" | 3:05 |
| 3. | "The Hybrid (Solar Bars)" | 2:45 |
| 4. | "Dance Wit Me" | 3:04 |
| 5. | "Demons and Angels" | 2:06 |
| 6. | "Hey!" | 2:18 |
| 7. | "Metal Gear Solid" | 2:40 |
| 8. | "1 Step" | 2:49 |
| 9. | "Sleep" | 2:56 |
| 10. | "Danger Zone" | 3:02 |
| 11. | "Tea Time" | 2:17 |
| 12. | "God Of War" | 2:41 |
| 13. | "Stay On" | 2:43 |
| 14. | "What I Talk" | 3:03 |
| 15. | "4Get Yo Name" | 2:33 |
| 16. | "Wake Up" | 2:30 |
| 17. | "Rainbow" (features Marv Won, Dopehead and Fatt Father) | 3:40 |
| Total length: | | 44:18 |
