= Paul White (music producer) =

English multi-instrumentalist, singer and record producer

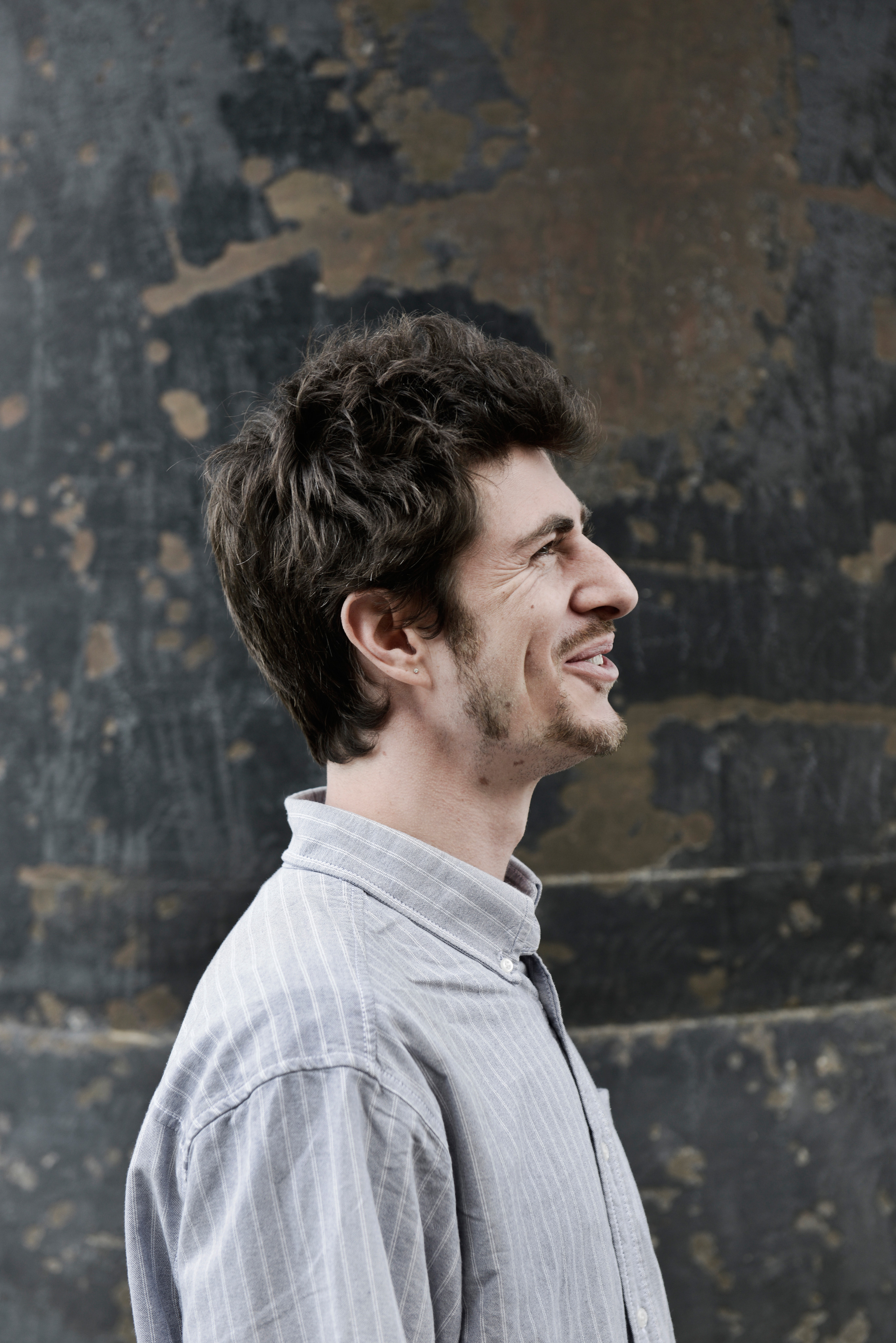

Background information
- Origin: Lewisham, London, England
- Genres: Hip-hop; electronic
- Occupations: Multi-instrumentalist; singer; record producer
- Years active: 2007–present
- Labels: R&S; One-Handed; Stones Throw; Now-Again; Lex
- Website: theworldofpaulwhite.com

Paul Williams White (Note: In this name, the surname is Williams White) is an English multi-instrumentalist, singer, and record producer from Lewisham. He is one half of the duo Golden Rules along with Eric Biddines.

== Early life ==
Paul White attended the BRIT School to study music technology, as well as art and design.

== Career ==
In 2009, Paul White released his debut studio album, The Strange Dreams of Paul White. Cay McDermott of The Quietus called it "one of the best and most creative albums of 2009." His 2011 studio album, Rapping with Paul White, featured vocal contributions from Guilty Simpson, Marv Won, Danny Brown, Moe Pope, Tranqill, Homeboy Sandman, Jehst, and Nancy Elizabeth. Jorge Cuellar of Urb called it "a genre-bending mixture of geographically diverse sounds." His 2014 studio album, Shaker Notes, was released on R&S Records. It included more live instrumentation and his own vocals.

In 2014, White announced he had formed a new group called Golden Rules with Eric Biddines. The duo's debut studio album, Golden Ticket, was released on Lex Records in 2015. It featured a guest appearance from Yasiin Bey. In 2016, White released a collaborative studio album with Open Mike Eagle, titled Hella Personal Film Festival, on Mello Music Group. Rolling Stone placed it at number 26 on the "40 Best Rap Albums of 2016" list.

White has collaborated with Danny Brown multiple times, producing tracks on Brown's albums XXX, Old, Atrocity Exhibition, and U Know What I'm Sayin?. He produced the entirety of Homeboy Sandman's 2014 EP, White Sands. He has also produced tracks for Jamie Woon, Jehst, and Obongjayar.

In 2018, he released a studio album, Rejuvenate, which featured vocal contributions from Denai Moore, Shungudzo, and Sarah Williams White.

== Style and influences ==
In his youth, Paul White listened to Nirvana, Rage Against the Machine, the Smashing Pumpkins, Wu-Tang Clan, and the Pharcyde. While attending the BRIT School, he discovered Aphex Twin's Selected Ambient Works 85–92. Before then, he had made music on guitar and piano. The album led him to making electronic music.

== Discography ==
=== Studio albums ===
- The Strange Dreams of Paul White (2009)
- Sounds from the Skylight (2009)
- Paul White & the Purple Brain (2010)
- Rapping with Paul White (2011)
- Shaker Notes (2014)
- Golden Ticket (2015) (with Eric Biddines, as Golden Rules)
- Hella Personal Film Festival (2016) (with Open Mike Eagle)
- Rejuvenate (2018)

=== EPs ===
- The Punch Drummer (2009)
- One Eye Open (2009)
- Rapping with Paul White: The Remix EP (2011)
- Watch the Ants (2013)
- Running on a Rainy Day (2014)
- Visits the Seagull Mansion (2015)
- Everything You've Forgotten (2017)

=== Singles ===
- "The Dragon Fly" b/w "A Silent Cry" (2007)
- "For You and for Me" b/w "We Want It All" (2008)
- "Versus the BBC" b/w "So Far Away" (2009)
- "And Nico" b/w "Goes to Hollywood" (2010)
- "My Guitar Whales" (2010)
- "Trust" (2011)
- "Street Lights" (2013)
- "Where You Gonna Go?" (2014)
- "Accelerator" (2017)
- "Spare Gold" (2018)
- "Ice Cream Man" (2018)
- "Returning (Rival Consoles Remix)" (2018)

=== Productions ===
- Ahu – "To: Love." from To: Love. (2010)
- Danny Brown – "Adderall Admiral", "Fields", and "Scrap or Die" from XXX (2011)
- Homeboy Sandman – "Look Out" and "They Can't Hang (Word to the Mother)" from Chimera (2012)
- Charli XCX – "So Far Away" from True Romance (2013)
- Danny Brown – "Side A (Old)", "The Return", "Wonderbread", "Lonely", and "Clean Up" from Old (2013)
- Homeboy Sandman – White Sands (2014)
- Homeboy Sandman – "Purist/Purest" from Tour Tape (2015)
- Jamie Woon – "Thunder" from Making Time (2015)
- Danny Brown – "Downward Spiral", "Tell Me What I Don't Know", "Ain't It Funny", "Golddust", "Dance in the Water", "From the Ground", "When It Rain", "Today", "Get Hi", and "Hell for It" from Atrocity Exhibition (2016)
- Jehst – "So Far to Go", "Kennedy", "City Streets", and "Eulogy" from Billy Green Is Dead (2017)
- Obongjayar – "Adjacent Heart" (2018)
- Danny Brown – "Change Up", "Belly of the Beast", "uknowhatimsayin¿", and "Shine" from uknowhatimsayin¿ (2019)
- Danny Brown – "Down wit It" and "Bass Jam" from Quaranta (2023)
