= Nancy Elizabeth =

- Born: 1983 (age 42–43); Higher End, England
- Origin: Wigan, Greater Manchester, England
- Genres: alternative, folk
- Occupations: Singer-songwriter, record producer
- Instruments: Voice, guitar, piano, harp, khim
- Years active: 1997–present
- Label: The Leaf Label
- Website: http://nancyelizabeth.bandcamp.com/

Nancy Elizabeth Cunliffe is an English folk singer-songwriter and multi-instrumentalist, who releases music with The Leaf Label. She is an active member of Sōka Gakkai.

== History ==
=== Early years ===
Nancy was born in Billinge Higher End, near Wigan, Greater Manchester, England, and learned piano and guitar at an early age, the latter being entirely self-taught. By the age of 18 she had made one EP, Basis, and one LP, Fly Alley, both of which were recorded, produced, manufactured and distributed by Nancy using home equipment. Around this time Cunliffe started to experiment with other instruments and acquired a khim from Thailand and a Celtic harp. Having initially started playing on the Wigan music scene, she attended Liverpool Institute for Performing Arts and moved to playing regularly in Manchester, Liverpool and around England.

=== The Wheel Turning King ===
Nancy's first EP, released in 2006, was recorded in an old Corinthian-style church on the outskirts of Liverpool and is named after the concept of an ideal ruler in ancient Indian mythology. Recorded at night to reduce traffic noise interference, some distortion can be heard when listening carefully: in particular on the aptly named "Waiting for Cars". The record was released by Manchester-based Timbreland.

=== Battle and Victory ===
The first LP, Battle and Victory was released 24 September 2007 and licensed to The Leaf Label. This marked the first record where Cunliffe was dropped as a performing name. The album was critically well received and drew favourable comparisons with music by Joanna Newsom, Josephine Foster and many others. The release of this album went hand in hand with an increase in the number of live performances, and she started to tour both the UK, Europe and further afield with regularity.

=== Wrought Iron ===
The second album Wrought Iron was released on 5 October 2009, again with The Leaf Label. It received excellent reviews, prompting an article to be written by Laura Barton in The Guardian. Drawing inspiration from natural sounds of the Faroe Islands (her grandmother's birthplace), rural Spain and the Lake District, the album was recorded in a remote corner of North Wales. Described as a "sparse album, dusted with piano, breathy vocals and harmonies, and touches of acoustic guitar, horns and accordion" this work moves away from the multi-instrumental previous works to concentrate mainly on the piano, guitar and vocal arrangements. Track 4 of the album was released as a single with an accompanying video, shot in Portishead lido.

=== Dancing – third album ===
Recorded by herself in her small flat in Manchester, her third album was released on 20 May 2013 and received a four star review in Time Out and MusicOMH. The entertainment section of BBC Online recommended it for an 'alternative mercury award' stating that "Her cascading, intricately-arranged songs transcend genre conventions – swirling strings and breathy harmonies conjuring up everything from Ennio Morricone to PJ Harvey"

=== Collaborations ===
Cunliffe has collaborated for many live shows and records, including touring with Tunng, A Hawk and a Hacksaw and James Yorkston. More recently a UK tour with James Blackshaw and Hauschka saw her perform live pieces written specifically for the tour, which features a headline show in the main hall of the Barbican Centre. She has also worked with Susumu Yokota and is in production with Paul White

=== TEDxUniversityOfManchester ===
In this TEDx talk, Nancy Elizabeth talked about her journey as an artist and how her creative process has developed, as well as performing some of her music. She said that she uses "everything she can get her hands on" in the creative process: from guitars and pianos to Celtic harps, harmoniums and dulcimers.

== Discography ==
=== Singles ===
- "Hey Son" (2007)
- "I Used to Try" (2007)
- "Feet of Courage" (2009)
- "The Last Battle" (2013)

=== Extended plays and albums ===
- The Wheel Turning King EP (2006)
- Battle and Victory LP (2007)
- Wrought Iron LP (2009)
- Dancing LP (2013)
