= XXX (Danny Brown album) =

Mixtape by Danny Brown
- Released: August 15, 2011
- Genre: Alternative hip-hop
- Length: 53:18
- Label: Fool's Gold
- Producers: Brandun DeShay; DJ House Shoes; Frank Dukes; Nick Speed; Paul White; Quelle; Skywlkr; Squadda Bambino

Danny Brown chronology
Hawaiian Snow (2010)	XXX (2011)	Black and Brown! (2011)

XXX (pronounced "triple x" or "30") is the eighth mixtape by American rapper Danny Brown. It was released on August 15, 2011, by Fool's Gold Records. The mixtape's production was handled by Frank Dukes, Brandun DeShay, Skywlkr, Nick Speed, Quelle, Paul White, Squadda Bambino and DJ House Shoes. The only guest appearances on the project come from Brown's Bruiser Brigade cohorts Chips and Dopehead. XXX received widespread acclaim from critics, serving as Danny Brown's breakthrough project.

On March 13, 2012, the mixtape was re-released on iTunes with three new tracks and a digital booklet included.

== Background ==
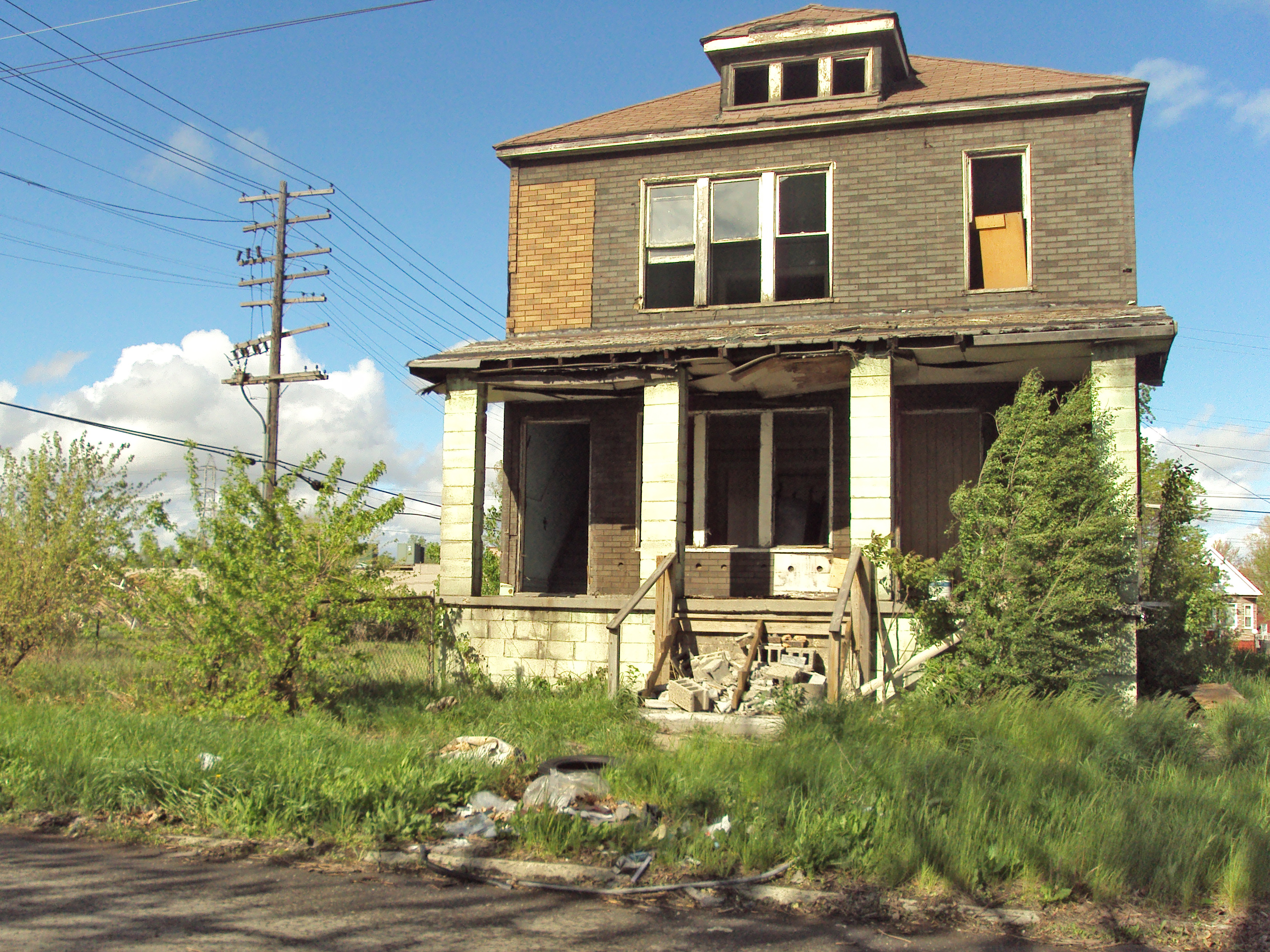
On XXX, Brown raps about the decline of Detroit and the dilemma caused by its abandoned houses and buildings.

XXX was released as a free download by Brooklyn, New York-based record label Fool's Gold Records. The project was supposed to be released as a studio album but according to Brown himself, the label told him "XXX wasn’t good enough to be an album so they put it out as a free mixtape."

Brown cited XXX as his attempt at "experimenting and seeing how far [he] could push listeners" with his music. He explains that XXX is an effort at a serious concept album with a storyline, citing track 13 "DNA" as the start of Side B: "The cover looked like a vinyl to me, so I was going with that whole vibe". He explained that "the first side is all having fun" before the album takes a serious turn from "DNA" onward.

While recording the mixtape, Brown was listening to a lot of Joy Division. He has also stated he recorded XXX with the intent of having it critically acclaimed: "I made XXX with the aim of getting great reviews."

== Critical reception ==
Professional ratings
Aggregate scores
Source	Rating
Metacritic	83/100
Review scores
Source	Rating
AllMusic	4.5/5 stars
Fact	4.5/5
Pitchfork	8.2/10
PopMatters	7/10
Q	4/5 stars
RapReviews	8/10
Sputnikmusic	4.5/5
URB	4/5 stars
Vice	A−

XXX was met with widespread critical acclaim. At Metacritic, which assigns a normalized rating out of 100 to reviews from professional publications, the mixtape received an average score of 83, based on nine reviews.

Vincent Thomas of AllMusic wrote, "XXX – named for his gutter-filthy mouth and his 30th birthday – is an accomplishment." Jack Law of Fact noted, "It's Brown's embracing of contradictions that makes him such a fascinating rapper, and XXX is given depth and longevity by a tension, or collision between hardcore rap's reality fix and the avant-garde's desire for creative and expressive freedom from reality." Patrick Taylor of RapReviews said, "XXX is another excellent release from the man who is one of the best rappers out there, proving that you can be lyrical and street at the same time, and that hip-hop doesn't have to be one dimensional."

David Amidon of PopMatters said, "Beyond its confrontational veneer lies a 19 track collection of a good number of 2011's hardest, freshest, most concrete bars imaginable." Pitchfork wrote positively, "His gleeful love of words not only elevates some pretty heavy subject matter; it also helps distinguish XXX as one of the most compelling indie rap releases in an already strong year." Will Robinson of Sputnikmusic also wrote "XXX is an absolutely essential hip-hop release in the age of Internet distribution and excess, and as the extreme of the lyrical tameness spectrum it's necessary for anyone who claims to be at all knowledgeable about hip-hop."

=== Accolades ===
Pitchfork placed the project at number 19 on its list of the "Top 50 albums of 2011", while Spin named it the top hip-hop album of 2011. In October 2013, Complex named XXX the eighth best hip-hop album of the last five years. In June 2016, Pitchfork placed the mixtape at number three on its list of the "50 Best Rap Mixtapes of the Millennium" and in 2019, they placed it at 63 on their list of "The Best 200 Albums of the 2010s".

== Track listing ==
All tracks are written by Daniel Sewell.

XXX track listing
No.	Title	Producer(s)	Length
1.	"XXX"	Frank Dukes	1:51
2.	"Die Like a Rockstar"	Skywlkr	2:26
3.	"Pac Blood"	Brandun DeShay	2:32
4.	"Radio Song"	DeShay	2:22
5.	"Lie4"	Skywlkr	3:12
6.	"I Will"	Squadda Bambino	3:16
7.	"Bruiser Brigade" (featuring Dopehead)	Skywlkr	3:45
8.	"Detroit187" (featuring Chips)	Nick Speed	3:05
9.	"Monopoly"	Quelle	2:45
10.	"Blunt After Blunt"	Skywlkr	3:26
11.	"Outer Space"	Skywlkr	2:44
12.	"Adderall Admiral"	Paul White	1:43
13.	"DNA"	Frank Dukes	2:57
14.	"Nosebleeds"	DJ House Shoes	1:37
15.	"Party All the Time"	DeShay	3:28
16.	"EWNESW"	Quelle	2:23
17.	"Fields"	White	2:33
18.	"Scrap or Die"	White	3:56
19.	"30"	Skywlkr	3:18
Total length:			53:18

iTunes deluxe edition (bonus tracks)
No.	Title	Producer(s)	Length
20.	"Baseline"	Skywlkr	2:40
21.	"Witit"	Skywlkr	2:43
22.	"Shouldn't of"	Skywlkr	2:29
Total length:			61:10

== Personnel ==
- Danny Brown – primary artist
- Squadda Bambino – producer
- Chips – guest artist
- Brandun DeShay – producer
- Dopehead – guest artist
- DJ House Shoes – producer
- Frank Dukes – producer
- Quelle – producer
- Skywlkr – producer
- Nick Speed – producer
- Paul White – producer
