= Hawaiian Snow =

Mixtape by Danny Brown and Tony Yayo
- Released: September 14, 2010
- Genre: Hip-hop
- Length: 44:39
- Label: G-Unit
- Producer: Doe Pesci

Tony Yayo chronology
Gunpowder Guru 2: The Remixes (2010)	Hawaiian Snow (2010)	Gunpowder Guru 3 (2011)

Danny Brown chronology
The Hybrid (2010)	Hawaiian Snow (2010)	XXX (2011)

Professional ratings
Review scores
Source	Rating
PopMatters	6/10 stars

Hawaiian Snow is a collaborative mixtape by American rappers Danny Brown and Tony Yayo. The mixtape features exclusive tracks and freestyles from Yayo and Brown, with guest appearances from Lil B and Louie Castro.

== Track listing ==
All music is composed by Doe Pesci.

No.	Title	Length
1.	"Roll Up"	3:02
2.	"Bags Double Tied"	3:43
3.	"So High"	4:09
4.	"Trap Ball" (featuring Lil B)	4:03
5.	"On One"	3:33
6.	"O.M.G."	3:09
7.	"Trippin'" (featuring Lil B)	4:34
8.	"What Up"	3:53
9.	"My Cup"	3:00
10.	"My Life's the Shit"	4:24
11.	"Nothing to Lose" (featuring Louie Castro)	3:48
12.	"Cyclops"	3:17
Total length:		44:39
