= Danny Brown =

American rapper (born 1981)

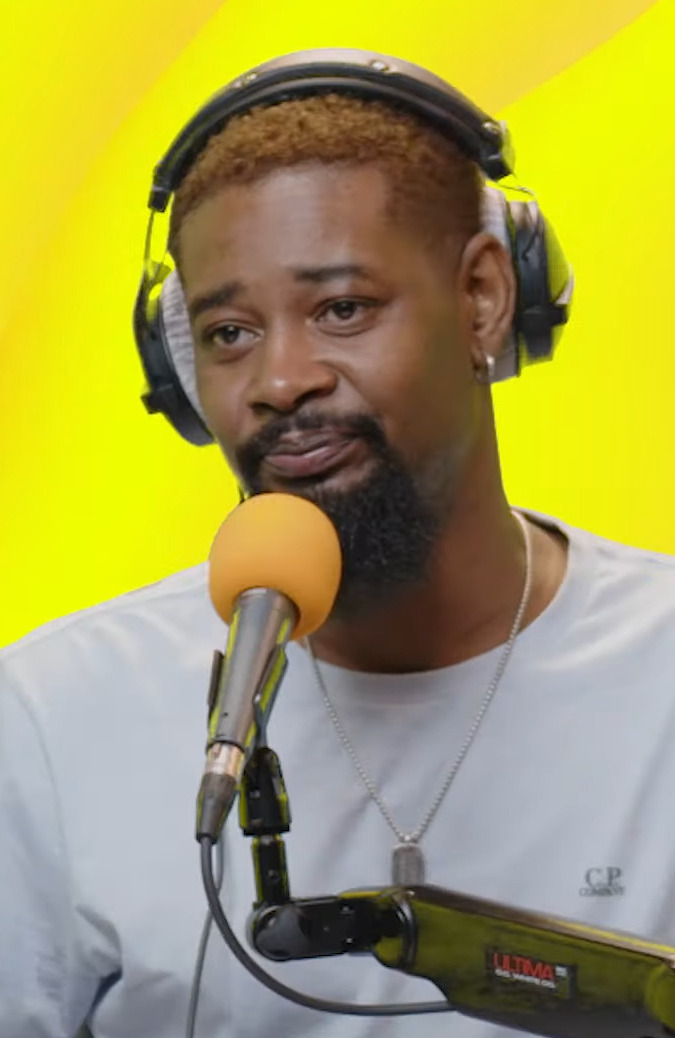
- Brown in 2022

Background information
- Born: Daniel Dewan Sewell; March 16, 1981 (age 45); Detroit, Michigan, U.S.
- Genres: Experimental hip-hop; alternative hip-hop; progressive rap; hardcore hip-hop; psychedelic rap; punk rap
- Occupations: Rapper; singer; songwriter
- Works: Discography
- Years active: 2003–present
- Labels: Rappers I Know; Hybrid Music; Warp; Scion A/V; Fool's Gold; Goliath
- Member of: Bruiser Brigade
- Children: 2
- Website: dannybrown.warp.net

Daniel Dewan Sewell (born March 16, 1981), better known by his stage name Danny Brown, is an American rapper, songwriter, actor and podcaster.

Born and raised in Detroit, Brown began rapping at a young age and was influenced by his father, a DJ who introduced him to hip-hop and house music. He began his music career in 2003, performing with local hip-hop groups while supporting himself by selling drugs. In 2007, Brown served eight months in jail after violating his probation for a drug-related case. After his release he continued his music career, self-releasing several mixtapes including Hot Soup (2008) and Hawaiian Snow (2010) with Tony Yayo. His debut studio album The Hybrid was released in 2010.

In 2011, Brown signed to Fool's Gold Records and achieved his first major breakthrough with the mixtape XXX, which received critical acclaim and significant attention from online music outlets, leading to him being named "Artist of the Year" by Spin and the Metro Times. The highly successful non-album single "Grown Up" followed in 2012. His second studio album Old (2013) received further critical acclaim and was commercially successful, reaching number 18 on the U.S. Billboard 200 and spawning the singles "Dip", "25 Bucks" and "Smokin & Drinkin".

In 2016, Brown signed with Warp Records and released the studio albums Atrocity Exhibition (2016) and UKnoWhatImSayin? (2019), to continued critical acclaim, although with reduced commercial sales. His collaborative album with JPEGMafia, Scaring the Hoes, and his fifth studio album Quaranta, were both released in 2023. Following a stint in rehab during which he became sober, Brown released his sixth studio album, the hyperpop-inspired Stardust in 2025.

Brown is known for his distinctive high-pitched vocal delivery, unconventional fashion sense and experimental approach to hip-hop. He was described by MTV in 2011 as "one of rap's most unique figures in recent memory" and by the Detroit Metro Times as "the most eccentric emcee ever born on Detroit soil".

== Early life ==
Brown was born Daniel Dewan Sewell in Detroit on March 16, 1981, the son of an 18-year-old mother and 16-year-old father. His father is half Filipino, and growing up Brown would attend a Filipino church in Detroit with his grandmother. His talent for rhyming came at a very young age, as his mother would read Dr. Seuss books to him as a child; when he began to speak, he would talk in rhyme. His father was a house DJ who exposed him to all the music he would spin, as well as music from the likes of Roy Ayers, LL Cool J, Esham, and A Tribe Called Quest. For as long as he could remember, Brown had always wanted to be a rapper: "In kindergarten I'd say I wanted to be a rapper and people'd just laugh at me. 'That's a pretty funny job,' they'd say."

Brown's young parents did their best to shelter him from the Detroit street crime and gang life: "My parents ain't really want me out the house. They did as much as they possibly could to keep me in the house with whatever the newest video game was. But you know you can only keep a kid in for so long. Plus that had me sheltered, so once I did get away I used to disappear for like four days." His two grandmothers helped provide for his family. His maternal grandmother worked for Chrysler, and she bought four to five houses: "To this day we still got those houses. She owns three houses in a row on that block. She raised her three children and a host of others in the middle house; the one to the left she paid cash for in the '90s from her long time neighbor; and the one on the right was her parents' home that she inherited when they died." She also owned two other homes on the east side of Detroit, one in which Brown was raised. The fifth house, also located on the east side, was occupied by his aunt and her family. Originally from the Dexter-Linwood way of Detroit, he later moved to Hamtramck. He heavily associates with Detroit in his music.

At age 18, Brown became a drug dealer: "Once I got above a certain age, all that parent shit stopped. My mom and my pops split up. Once my pops left, I was the man of the house. I always told myself I was going to be a rapper my whole life. I was selling drugs since that's what all my friends were doing. And it was kind of like something to rap about maybe." Although his intentions were to stop once he got in trouble with the law, Brown was already too accustomed to the lifestyle: "I always told myself once I got my first [legal] case I was gonna stop. Then I got my first case, but I didn't stop. I got distribution and manufacturing and possession with intent to distribute. I was 19." His run-ins with the law didn't stop there: "I caught my second case loitering with some weed, but it violated my probation but I ran and I didn't go to court. I just ran for like at least five years. But once I got caught I had to do eight months. [...] I had nothing else, so I just started going back to studying music and trying to become a rapper." After his release from jail in 2002, he began to take his passion seriously and turn it into a career: "I had more confidence when I got out of jail because the day when I got out of jail I started selling weed. I ain't had no money after the first two months, like, 'I was way better off in jail.' By then I was already making my New York trips and going to recording studios so I was already serious when I got locked up."

Brown began his career in a hip-hop group called Rese'vor Dogs, alongside fellow Detroit-based rappers Chips and Dopehead. In 2003, the trio independently released an album titled Runispokets-N-Dumpemindariva under Ren-A-Sance Entertainment and F.B.C. Records. In the summer of 2003, the group received mild rotation on Detroit radio stations with their lead single, "Yess". After growing up on hip-hop and tuning his rhyming skills in the city, Brown landed the attention of Roc-A-Fella Records A&R Travis Cummings, who flew Brown out to New York City, where he began recording in other artists' studios. After a lack of success with Roc-A-Fella, Brown returned to Detroit and eventually linked up with Detroit-based producer Nick Speed.

== Career ==
=== 2010: The Hybrid ===
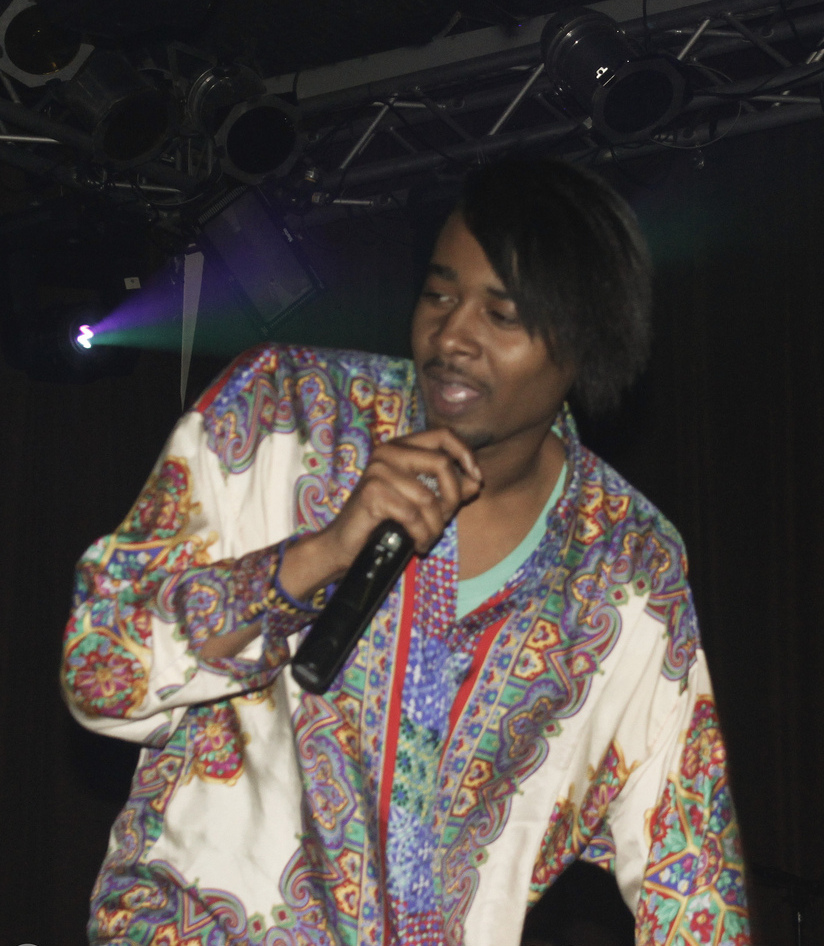
Brown performing in 2010

In 2010, Brown befriended fellow American rapper Tony Yayo of G-Unit, and they recorded their collaborative album Hawaiian Snow (2010). The G-Unit association led many to wonder if Brown would eventually sign with G-Unit leader 50 Cent's label G-Unit Records. However, he did not fit G-Unit's image as he favors fitted jeans and a vintage rock-inspired wardrobe, with Brown later telling MTV: "It was a real thing. 50 was with it; he just didn't sign me because of my jeans. He liked the music, but he didn't like the way I looked. I understand where they were coming from with that, but you gotta understand where I'm coming from too: I'm from Detroit."

After recording and releasing four volumes of his Detroit State of Mind mixtape series and other free self-released mixtapes, Brown released his first solo studio album, The Hybrid (2010), on indie record label Rappers I Know. It was this album where he began to use his trademark high-pitched voice: "The first song that I ever rapped [with the high-pitched voice] was 'The Hybrid,' that's why we called it 'The Hybrid.' I think that was [when I found my voice]. That was the statement that I can rap and I can do every style of rap." The album came to fruition after he had written the aforementioned song: "The Hybrid started out because I started working with Hex Murder. Hex was managing me at the time and I had started recording in Black Milk's studio. We were working on a project and I had come up with the song 'The Hybrid,' so that gave me my whole intent on what I wanted to do with my next project. I started writing a new album and that's the album that I wrote. Then I hooked up with my homie Magnetic and he would just look out for me and gave me free studio time—so I would go record from 3 in the morning til 6 in the morning, because we were using the free time when nobody was there. Then I hooked up with Frank from Rappers I Know. I liked what he was doing with his blog. He looked out for me and helped me out a lot and then we put it out and the rest is history."

=== 2011–2012: XXX ===
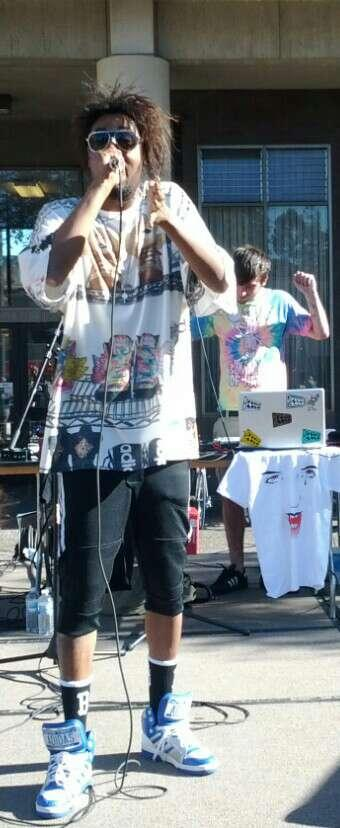
Brown performing in support of XXX in April 2012

In 2011 Brown signed to Brooklyn-based indie record label Fool's Gold Records: "My manager [Emeka Obi] asked me who I wanted to sign to and I said there's two labels I want to sign to: XL or Fool's Gold. He knew [people at] Fool's Gold. He saw Nick Catchdubs in a burrito spot, asked him about it, and Nick said he'd get back to him. Q-Tip and A-Trak went and ate lunch around last March. A-Trak told Q-Tip he was thinking about signing me and Q-Tip told him to do it. A-Trak called me and signed me. I met Q-Tip but I know Ali Shaheed more. Ali Shaheed is kind of like a mentor to me. Around the time of The Hybrid, I met him through Frank from Rappers I Know and he just started showing me love. We talk on the phone a lot."

Signing to Fool's Gold Records proved to be Brown's biggest commercial and critical move. The label went on to release his eighth mixtape, XXX, as a free download. It received numerous critical accolades, including being named the best hip-hop album of the year by Spin. Pitchfork gave his album an 8.2 out of 10, saying, "If XXX was nothing but debauchery and desperation, it would quickly devolve into an endless slog. Thankfully, Brown is also hilariously funny, an endlessly inventive rapper driven to cook up outrageous variations on standard rap boasts." The publication later named XXX the 19th best album of 2011. XXX was also named the 6th-best album of 2011 by Passion of the Weiss, which called it "an uncomfortably honest self-portrait made even more remarkable by the fact that Danny Brown is alive to tell the story."

On November 1, 2011, Brown released his collaborative effort with American record producer Black Milk, an extended play (EP) titled Black and Brown!. On November 28, 2011, Brown released the music video for the XXX cut "Blunt After Blunt." The video was directed by fellow American rapper ASAP Rocky, who also made a cameo appearance. In the wake of his success with XXX, Brown began touring with Childish Gambino in March 2012. On March 13, 2012, Brown released the visual treatment for the brandUn DeShay-produced track "Radio Song" from XXX. The video was directed by Alex/2tone.

In 2012, Brown was featured on the cover of XXL as part of its annual "Top 10 Freshmen list" along with fellow then-up-and-coming rappers Hopsin, French Montana, MGK, Iggy Azalea and Roscoe Dash, among others. The Fader enlisted both Kendrick Lamar and Danny Brown to cover the front pages of its 2012 Spring Style issue. In a January 2012 interview, singer Jennifer Herrema revealed that Danny Brown would be featured on the second album by Australian electronic music group the Avalanches. Later in the year, Brown confirmed that he was working with the Avalanches on a song titled "Frankie Sinatra."

=== 2012–2014: Old ===
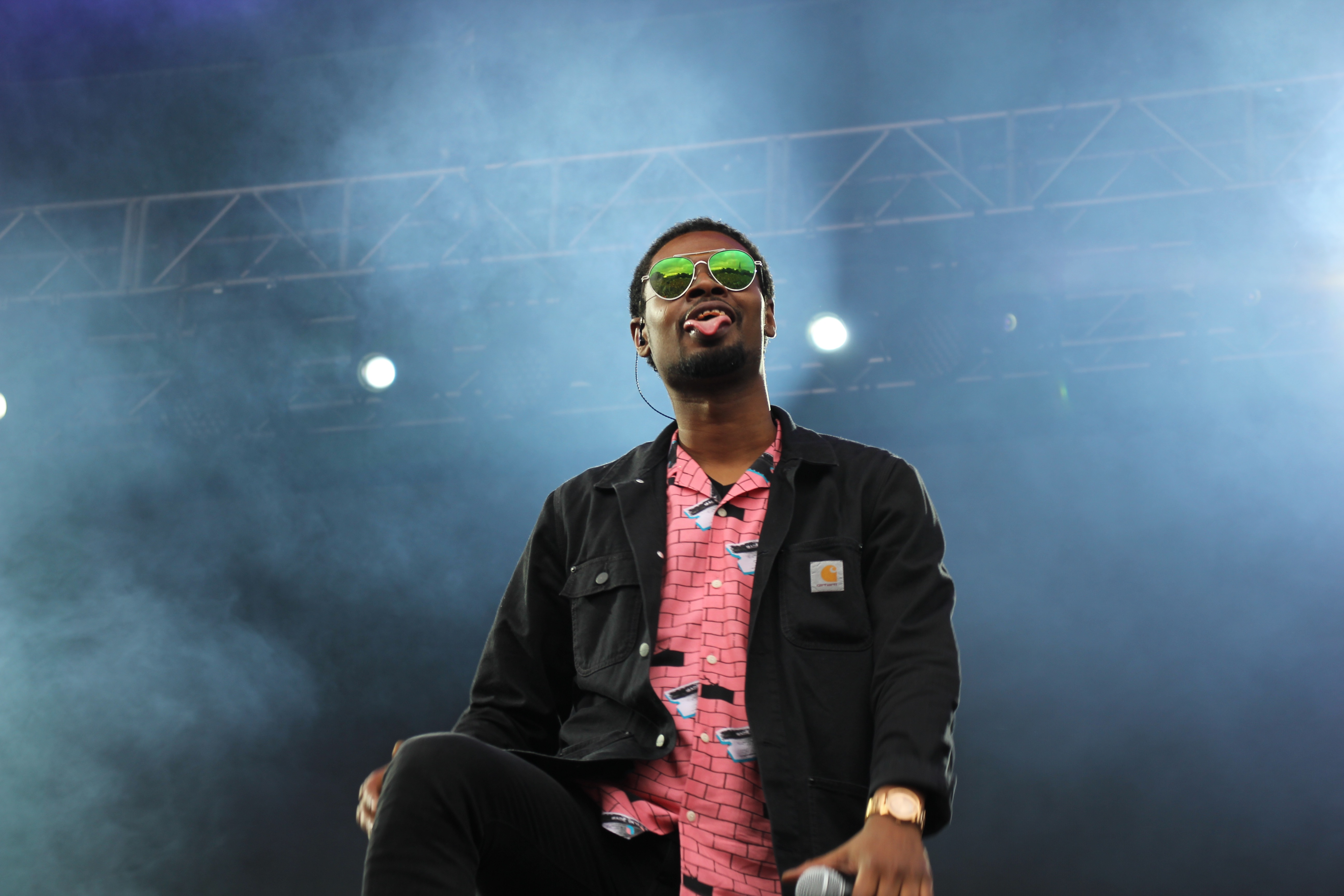
Brown performing in June 2013

In February 2012, Brown was featured first on the cover of the publication The Fader, in its 78th issue. On March 22, 2012, Brown teamed up with Scion A/V to release a new song titled "Grown Up." The music video for "Grown Up," later released on August 20, was also presented by Scion A/V. In August 2012, it was rumored that Brown was working on a new album titled Danny Johnson, to be entirely produced by Johnson&Jonson (Blu and Mainframe), but Brown later denied these rumors and confirmed that the album had already been released for free in 2010, under the title It's a Art. In August, Brown also performed at the 13th annual Gathering of the Juggalos. In September, Brown teamed up with Scion A/V once again to release the debut project of his rap group Bruiser Brigade, a hip-hop collective featuring Brown, Chips, Dopehead, Trpl Blk, ZelooperZ, and in-house producer SKYWLKR. The project was a four-track EP eponymously titled Bruiser Brigade.

In October 2012, Brown was featured on the soundtrack to the film The Man with the Iron Fists on a track titled "Tick, Tock," alongside fellow American rappers Raekwon, Joell Ortiz and Pusha T. On October 24, 2012, Brown released the music video for a song titled "Witit," taken from the deluxe edition of XXX and his OD EP; later that day after Complex kept referring to his next album as Danny Johnson, Brown took to Twitter to reveal the correct tentative title to be ODB. From September to November, Brown appeared alongside Schoolboy Q and ASAP Mob as supporting acts for ASAP Rocky's 40-date national Long. Live. ASAP Tour.

In December 2012, Brown announced ODB had been completed. He explained that the album won't be as consistently humorous as XXX but said people will be surprised with the outcome: "The new album is done. We're pretty much just figuring out a way of presenting the right way to get released…the title of the album for now is ODB. I can't really elaborate on what that means until the album comes out, and then they'll get it. I don't want to give too much because then it'll be a much more rewarding listen for my fans." He continued, "It's a rewarding listen when I listen to it. I don't know if I laugh as much - I think I laugh when it's over with, and that's the difference between this album and XXX. With XXX, you laugh throughout it, and by the time it was over with, you were like, 'Oh that wasn't too funny.' This one, when it's over, you're laughing hysterically…it's not necessarily what's being said on the album, but the album [itself], like, 'I can't believe he made this.'" Rolling Stone magazine named Brown's single "Grown Up", the 41st-best song of 2012.

In a December 2012 interview with Pitchfork, Brown revealed the album would actually be titled Old. The album, released under Fool's Gold, was released to music retailers, unlike any of his previous releases. The album includes contributions from ASAP Rocky, Schoolboy Q, Ab-Soul, Kitty and Purity Ring, the latter of whom are contributing production, along with a hook from vocalist Megan James.

In January 2013, it was announced that Brown would be performing at the 2013 Coachella Valley Music and Arts Festival. In the summer of 2012, Kathy Griffin invited Danny Brown and ASAP Rocky to appear on the Valentine's Day episode of her talk show Kathy. On February 14, Brown appeared alongside ASAP Rocky and Russell Brand, on Griffin's late-night talk show, where they played a dice game called "Suck breast? Kiss stomach?" and discussed the possibility of having children.

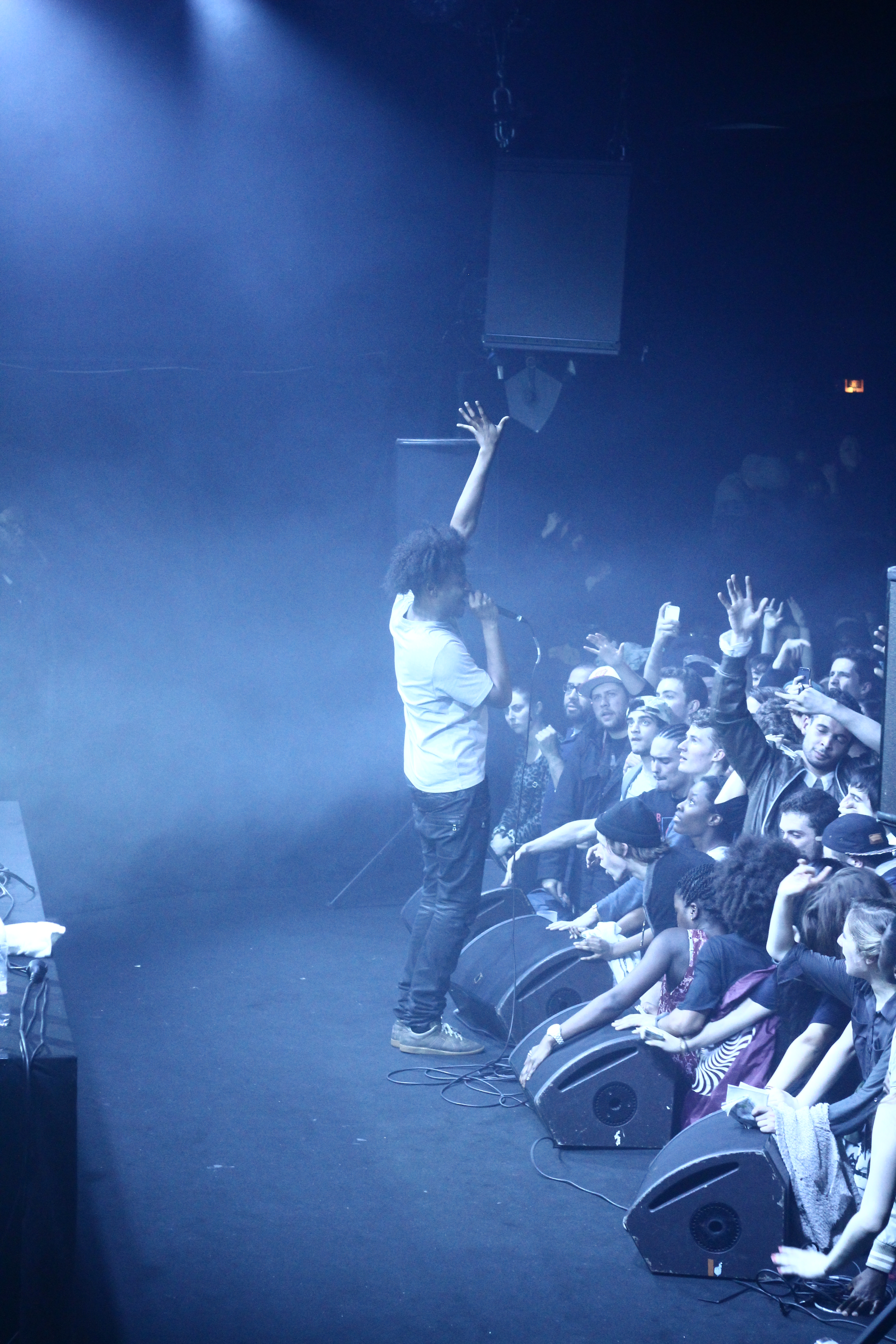
Brown performing in Paris in March 2014

On March 1, 2013, Brown and American record producer Baauer announced their upcoming "Worst of Both Worlds" Tour. For the trek, the Fool's Gold signees started in Houston, Texas on April 9 at Fitzgerald's. The brief tour, which only hit the West Coast, made stops in Austin, Texas, Tucson, Arizona and San Francisco, California. They played both weekends of the Coachella Music and Arts Festival, wrapping up the tour on the second weekend (April 20). On March 8, Brown announced another tour in promotion for his upcoming album, the "Old & Reckless" Tour, featuring American female rapper Kitty. For his first headlining tour, Brown began at SXSW on March 15 with a pair of shows. After completing his "Worst of Both Worlds" trek with Baauer, Kitty joined him for stops in St. Louis, Missouri, Ann Arbor, Michigan, New York City, New York and Madison, Wisconsin. The tour concluded at Indianapolis, Indiana's Deluxe on May 14. In March, Brown also won his first award ever at the 2013 Woodie Awards, winning in the Best Video category for "Grown Up."

On March 18, 2013, Brown revealed in a Twitter post that Old would be released around the time XXX came out, which was mid August. On March 23, it was announced Brown had signed a management deal with Goliath Artists, which also houses names such as Eminem, The Alchemist, Blink-182 and most recently Action Bronson, who has previously collaborated with Brown. On May 3, Brown announced through Twitter that Old would feature guest appearances from Freddie Gibbs, Schoolboy Q, Mr. MFN eXquire, Scrufizzer, ASAP Rocky, Ab-Soul, Charli XCX and Purity Ring. He also said the production on the album was handled by Paul White, Oh No, Rustie, Skywlkr, A-Trak, Darq E Freaker and Frank Dukes. After an unfinished version leaked earlier in the year, Brown visited Tim Westwood on BBC Radio 1xtra in June 2013 to premiere the official version of "Kush Coma," a song featuring ASAP Rocky taken from the Old album. On July 23, Brown was featured rapping alongside Insane Clown Posse in the music video for their song "When I'm Clownin'."

On August 12, Brown said on Twitter that he felt less than a priority at Fool's Gold Records: "Man #OLD fuck around and never come out ... Smh," tweeted Brown, referring to his forthcoming album Old. Brown then threatened to leak the album himself: "I'm a fuck around and leak that shit myself if niggas don't get it together." Subsequently, Fool's Gold Records founder A-Trak, announced that Old was indeed in the label pipeline, with a music video on the way. On August 26, 2013, Brown announced via Twitter that Old would be released on September 30, 2013. Old debuted at number 17 on the U.S. Billboard 200, selling 15,000 copies in its first week of release.

On October 3, 2013, Danny Brown and A-Trak announced their "Double Trouble" tour. In November 2013, Brown was featured in the interactive music video for American singer-songwriter Bob Dylan's 1965 hit single "Like a Rolling Stone." In January 2014, Brown guest-starred in the Fox animated TV series Lucas Bros. Moving Co., voicing a character named Jumanji in the first-season episode "A/C Tundra." Brown's song "Witit" was also featured in the episode. On January 22, 2014, Danny Brown made his network television debut with a performance on Jimmy Kimmel Live!. Joined by Purity Ring vocalist Megan James, Brown performed "25 Bucks," a track off Old.

In April 2014, Hot Soup, one of Brown's early mixtapes, was re-released as a double LP and 7-inch with 7 bonus tracks for Record Store Day. It was also released on CD with a bonus disc of instrumentals. Along with Hot Soup, Brown released Old as a double LP and a box set. On March 25, 2014, Brown appeared on The Arsenio Hall Show, where he promoted his second album, Old, and performed the single "Dip" from the album.

On July 10, 2014, Brown opened for Macklemore & Ryan Lewis in front of 37,500 people in Marlay Park, Dublin. On July 11 and 12, Brown opened in front of 100,000 fans for Eminem's sold-out concert at Wembley Stadium in London. In November 2014, Brown appeared on the song "Detroit vs. Everybody" alongside fellow Detroit-based rappers Eminem, Royce Da 5'9", Trick-Trick, Dej Loaf and Big Sean, from the Shady Records compilation album Shady XV.

=== 2014–2016: Atrocity Exhibition ===
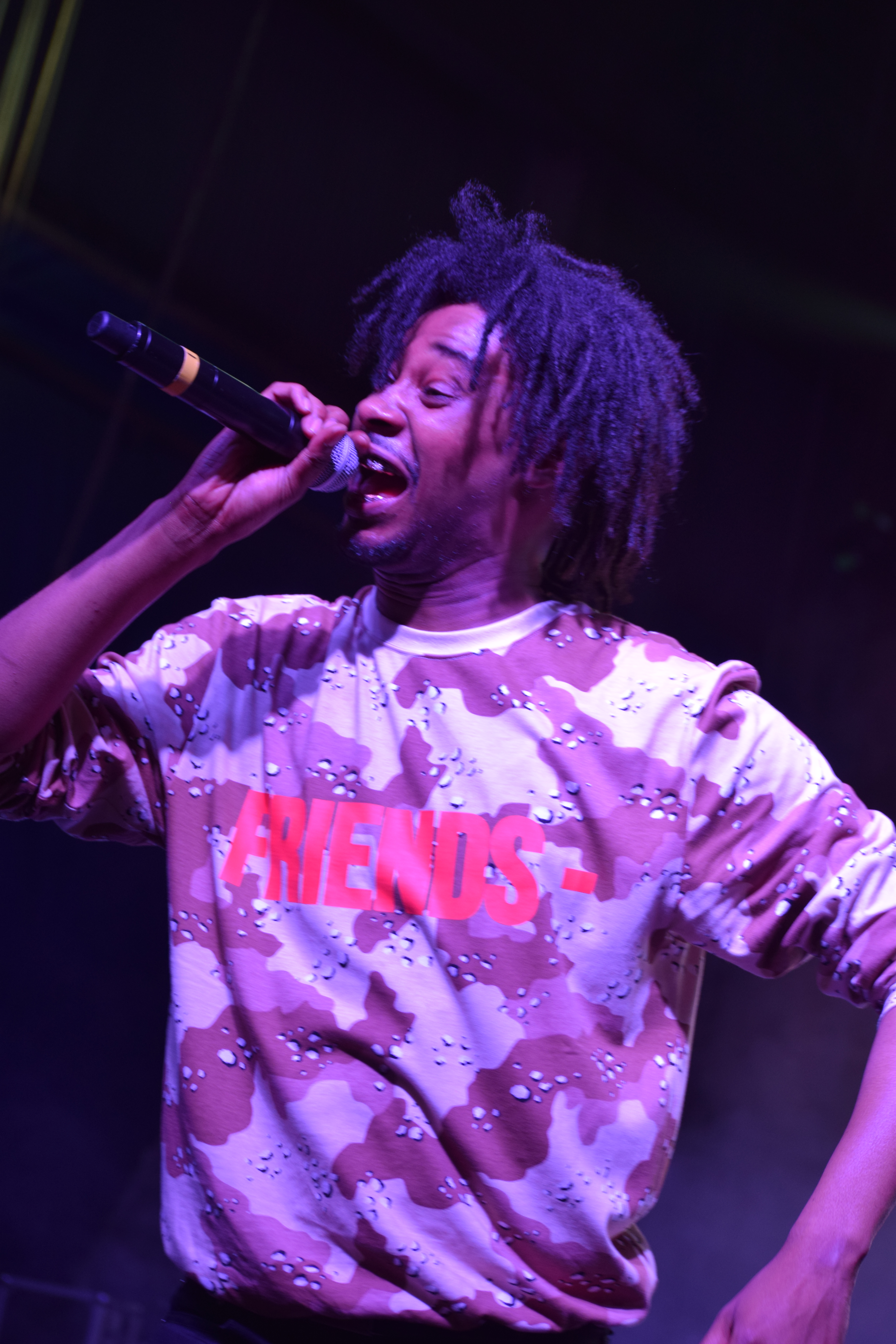
Brown performing in July 2016

In October 2014, Brown announced he was working on a new album. In January 2015, Brown announced he was working on a Dr. Seuss-inspired children's book for his 13-year-old daughter. He told Australian radio station Triple J, "It's really about self-esteem in black girls. You know how black women do so much—process their hair, change their eye color? It's really about a little girl who does all these things to herself and changes herself, and she realizes she's just better off the way she is." In April 2015, when asked if his album was done, Brown responded: "Almost. I took a break from it cause I'm so ahead of schedule with it knowing it ain't coming out no time soon".

In 2015, Brown became the lead artist on the theme song for the ABC comedy series Fresh Off the Boat. On June 10, 2016, he revealed on Instagram that he was "putting the final touches" on his third album. On June 14, he announced his signing to Warp Records and released "When It Rain", the first official single from his upcoming album. On July 17, he stated his new album would be titled Atrocity Exhibition, taking inspiration from the Joy Division song. In August 2016, Brown appeared on The Eric Andre Show, alongside ASAP Rocky, Nocando, Open Mike Eagle, and Go Dreamer, in a segment titled "Rapper Warrior Ninja". His album Atrocity Exhibition was shortlisted by IMPALA (The Independent Music Companies Association) for the Album of the Year Award 2016, which rewards on a yearly basis the best album released on an independent European label.

=== 2018–2022: UKnoWhatImSayin? ===
In late April 2019, it was announced that Brown's fourth studio album, UKnoWhatImSayin?, would be released later that year, featuring production from Q-Tip, JPEGMafia, and Paul White. In June 2019, Viceland announced that Brown would star in a talk show titled Danny's House produced by Derrick Beckles. The show's first season began on August 14, 2019. Since August 12, 2019, he plays the character Griffin in Nathan Barnatt's web series Dad Feels and was featured in the song "Dad Feels Good". In December 2019, he appeared as himself in a Grand Theft Auto Online expansion as a radio host with Skepta. Brown also lent his voice to Yung Ancestor, another fictional character in the game. In 2020, Brown was once again featured on The Eric Andre Show, appearing with Talib Kweli as "Guest Judges" for the show's recurring segment "Rapper Warrior Ninja", after having been a contestant his previous appearance.

=== 2022–present: Scaring the Hoes, Quaranta, and Stardust ===
On January 15, 2023, rapper JPEGMafia hinted on his social media that he was working with Brown on a collaborative project. On February 28, 2023, on The Danny Brown Show, both Brown and JPEGMafia announced that their collaborative project is named Scaring the Hoes Vol. 1, and played a sneak peek of the first single on the project. On March 13, 2023, the first single of the project called "Lean Beef Patty" was released to streaming services, and the album was released on March 24, 2023, under the title Scaring the Hoes.

On October 17, 2023, it was announced that Brown would release his fifth studio album, titled Quaranta, on November 17. The first single, titled "Tantor", was released the same day. The second single, "Jenn's Terrific Vacation", was released on November 14.

On September 23, 2025, Brown released the single "Starburst", the lead single from his album Stardust, which released November 7. It features contributions from Quadeca, underscores, JOHNNASCUS, Frost Children, ISSBROKIE, Femtanyl, Nnamdï, ta Ukrainka, Zheani, Cynthoni, and Jane Remover.

On January 8, 2026, Brown featured on up-and-coming UK artist Wesley Joseph's single "Peace of Mind" in the run up to his debut studio album, Forever Ends Someday.

On February 4, 2026, Brown announced that his 2012 debut single, "Grown Up", will be re-released as a 7" single for Record Store Day on April 18, 2026. It will be limited to 1,500 copies and will feature the song's instrumental on its B-side.

== Artistry ==
Brown's rapping style came from his careful study of Dizzee Rascal and E-40. His other musical influences come from a wide range of artists including Jay-Z, Nas, Eminem, Joy Division, Lil B, System of a Down, Radiohead, Outkast and J Dilla. While writing his album Atrocity Exhibition, he drew further inspiration from the Talking Heads and Björk. In 2024, Brown said he was inspired by the hyperpop subculture and associated artists such as Frost Children and Dorian Electra.

== Personal life ==
Brown has a daughter who was born in 2002. The daughter of his high school girlfriend, he stepped in to raise her when the girl's biological father was convicted of murder before her birth.

In a June 2022 interview, Brown alleged that Die Antwoord member Watkin Tudor Jones attempted to force Yolandi Visser on him, and Jones further assaulted him while sat on his lap by forcibly kissing him on the neck at an afterparty in Paris, France. Brown continued saying Jones left him "stressed out" when he threatened to find the hotel Brown was staying at.

In late March 2023, Brown voluntarily entered in-patient rehab for alcoholism. On June 28, less than a month before embarking on the Scaring the Hoes tour, he shared that he was 90 days sober.

== Discography ==
Studio albums

- The Hybrid (2010)
- Old (2013)
- Atrocity Exhibition (2016)
- UKnoWhatImSayin? (2019)
- Quaranta (2023)
- Stardust (2025)

Collaborative albums

- Scaring the Hoes (with JPEGMafia) (2023)

== Filmography ==
Year	Title	Role	Notes
2016, 2020	The Eric Andre Show	Himself	Episodes: "Stacey Dash; Jack McBrayer" and "Hannibal Quits"
2018	Detroiters	Dr. Mayflower	Episode: "Hark Motors"
2018	White Boy Rick	Edward "Black Ed" Hanserd	Film

== Awards and nominations ==
Year	Award	Category	Work	Result
2013	Woodie Awards	Best Video	"Grown Up"	Won
2020	Libera Awards	Best Hip-Hop/Rap Album	UKnoWhatImSayin?	Won
2020	Berlin Music Video Awards	Best Editor	3 TEARZ	Won
2024	Berlin Music Video Awards	Best Animation	Y.B.P. (feat. Bruiser Wolf)	Nominated
2024	Berlin Music Video Awards	Best Concept	Jenn's Terrific Vacation	Nominated
2026	Berlin Music Video Awards	Best Experimental	"Starburst"	Won
