= Nick Speed =

American rapper and record producer (born 1980)

- Born: Nicholas Marcell Speed; August 12, 1980 (age 45); Detroit, Michigan, US
- Genres: Hip-hop; electronic
- Occupations: Rapper; record producer; disc jockey
- Years active: 1998–present
- Labels: Capital Music Group; Mo-Town; Libido Sounds
- Website: nickspeed.com

Nicholas Marcell Speed (born August 12, 1980) is an American rapper, record producer, and disc jockey. He has produced songs for the likes of 50 Cent, Mopreme Shakur, Lloyd Banks, M.O.P., Talib Kweli, Phat Kat, Musiq Soulchild, Bishop Lamont, and Danny Brown.

== Career ==
A collection of Speed's beats found its way to the hands of Sha Money XL, who offered Nick an in-house production contract and management deal. Through this deal, Nick has produced tracks for many of today's most popular and influential emcees. He worked with Lloyd Banks the most during his time at g-unit and recurrently produced on "Cold Corner 2".

Lloyd Banks also contacted Nick for his third studio album "The Hunger For More 2" where he produced "Home Sweet Home. Nick has been quoted as saying he has produced at least 10 records for Lloyd Banks alone. Some are on albums some are on mixtapes".

During his time at G-Unit Nick developed a relationship with Dr. Dre protege at the time Bishop Lamont and despite both parties no longer being associated with G-Unit/Aftermath they recently collaborated on a record called "Don't Stop" featuring Mopreme Shakur.

=== Nick Speed & Seven the General ===
Nick & Seven the General first worked together as a writer/producer team in 2010 on K'Jon Present's Nick Speed & the Detroit Connect. Later that year "Seven the General" was named one of 11 "Hottest Local Talent" by WJLB for his Nick Speed produced "I Get It In" feat. K'Jon released on Seven's "the Sanctum Sanctorum" LP.

In early 2013 Nick Speed produced "A.R.T the DIA project" for Detroit emcee Seven the General. The album would go on to be nominated for a Detroit Music Award "Outstanding Electronic/Dance Recording" based on the track "Knowhere". Entirely produced by Nick Speed "A.R.T. the DIA project" also features the songs "Show Up" & "Detroit City Blues" by Seven the General featuring Guilty Simpson & Bizarre that became the official promotional anthem for "The Detroit Design Festival" held annually in Detroit. Seven the General would go on to win the Detroit Music Award for "Outstanding Rap Recording" in 2016.

In August 2014 Seven the General & Nick Speed released "A.R.T. the DIA project" Documentary. The 23 minute film documents the creation of A.R.T. the DIA project (Seven the General's 4th solo LP) and gives an in-depth look into the producer and songwriters musical partnership and dedication to Detroit and Hip-Hop as a genre.

The Detroit Underground hip-hop awards in 2015 presented the two with "Best Full Length Project" for the "A.R.T. the DIA project" LP. Subsequently, In October 2016 Nick Speed & Seven the General were added to the Detroit Institute of Arts permanent archive. The museum purchased the photograph shot by Jenny Risher as representation of the Detroit Hip Hop as art which was the goal set by Seven & Nick.

== Discography ==
=== Studio albums ===
- The Beat Down (2013, Vinyl only)
- D-Cyphered (2017)

=== Production ===
- 50 Cent - "What If"
- Lloyd Banks - "Anotha Dolla", "Stranger", "Home Sweet Home" (featuring Pusha T), "Cold Corner 2 (Eyes Wide)", "Victims Of Society", "Everywhere You Go", "A Lil Bit Colder", "Love Shots"
- Proof - "Biboa's Theme"
- Talib Kweli - "NY Weather Report", "Tater Tot"
- Phat Kat - "Vessels" (featuring Truth Hurts)
- Danny Brown - "Detroit 187" and almost all of Hot Soup.
- Bishop Lamont - "Don't Stop" (featuring Mopreme Shakur)
- Bizarre - Rock Out
- Rapper Big Pooh - Dusty
- Obie Trice - "Gangster", "Dope", What You Gonna Do (featuring Dr. Dre & Eminem)
- Seven The General - "A.R.T. the DIA project" LP (2012)
- The Regiment - "Live From The Coney Island (2014)"

=== Vocals ===
- Elzhi - "We'll Get By"
- J Dilla - "Dillatroit"
- Danny Brown - "She Love It"

=== Mixing, writing and arrangements ===
- J Dilla - "Rebirth Of Detroit"
- Talib Kweli - "Tater Tot"
- Lloyd Banks - "Home Sweet Home" (featuring Pusha T), "Stranger"
- Proof - "Searching for Jerry Garcia"
- 50 Cent - "What If"

=== Features ===
- J Dilla - Rebirth of Hip-Hop
- Danny Brown - Hot Soup
- 50 Cent - Get Rich or Die Tryin' (Official Soundtrack)
- Lloyd Banks - The Big Withdrawal, Rotten Apple, The Hunger For More 2, The Cold Corner 2
- Eminem - "Recovery" (Mixtape)
