= Vanisher, Horizon Scraper =

2025 studio album by Quadeca

Studio album by Quadeca
- Released: July 25, 2025
- Genres: Folktronica; art pop; experimental hip-hop
- Length: 69:24
- Label: X8 Music
- Producers: Quadeca; Johan Lenox; Noah Ehler; Johnny May

Quadeca chronology
Scrapyard (2024)	Vanisher, Horizon Scraper (2025)	Life 1 (2026)

Singles from Vanisher, Horizon Scraper
- 1. "Godstained" Released: March 25, 2025; 2. "Monday" Released: April 22, 2025; 3. "Forgone" Released: June 12, 2025

Vanisher, Horizon Scraper is the fourth studio album by the American musician Quadeca. It was released on July 25, 2025, via Quadeca's own record label, X8 Music, marking his first release after leaving DeadAir Records. Released as the follow-up to his third studio album I Didn't Mean to Haunt You (2022), it was preceded by the singles "Godstained", "Monday", and "Forgone". The album contains features by Olēka, Danny Brown, and Maruja.

In contrast to the ghost concept and themes of suicide ideation of I Didn't Mean to Haunt You, Vanisher, Horizon Scraper narrates a sailor venturing out to sea until his demise in the ocean akin to Moby-Dick. The album sonically blends folktronica with art pop and experimental hip-hop. An accompanying film—written, directed, produced, edited by, and starring Quadeca—was released alongside the album. It was shot in the Philippines, Greece, and Oregon. Thematically, it focuses on the sailor from daybreak to midnight with color fusions on specific tracks.

Vanisher, Horizon Scraper received generally positive reviews from music critics for its conceptual narrative and experimental production, though some found its pacing and lyricism to be weak. To promote the album, Quadeca sold additional merchandise items including a photo book and a Bakunawa plush, and toured in North America and Europe between October and December 2025. Commercially, the album performed on two Billboard charts, the North American College and Community Radio Chart, two UK charts, and the Scottish Albums Chart.

== Background ==
On November 10, 2022, Quadeca released his third studio album, I Didn't Mean to Haunt You, through DeadAir Records and AWAL, to critical acclaim from The Needle Drop and Spill. It is a folktronica concept album about a ghost in a purgatory-like state with themes of loneliness and grief. Being entirely produced by Quadeca, the album featured guest appearances from Danny Brown, the Sunday Service Choir, and Thor Harris.

In 2023, Quadeca released a series of Scrapyard EPs, he released the project as a whole mixtape on February 16, 2024, also to critical acclaim. Sonically, the mixtape featured a wide range of genres, including hyperpop, indie folk, art pop, and rage. Thematically, Scrapyard expresses heartbreak and vulnerability. The mixtape marked Quadeca's final release with DeadAir, as he left to prioritize creative control and found his own record label, X8 Music. In 2025, Quadeca collaborated on several tracks with and was a co-executive producer of Kevin Abstract's studio album Blush. It was released by X8 Music on June 27, 2025.

== Production and composition ==
=== Overview ===
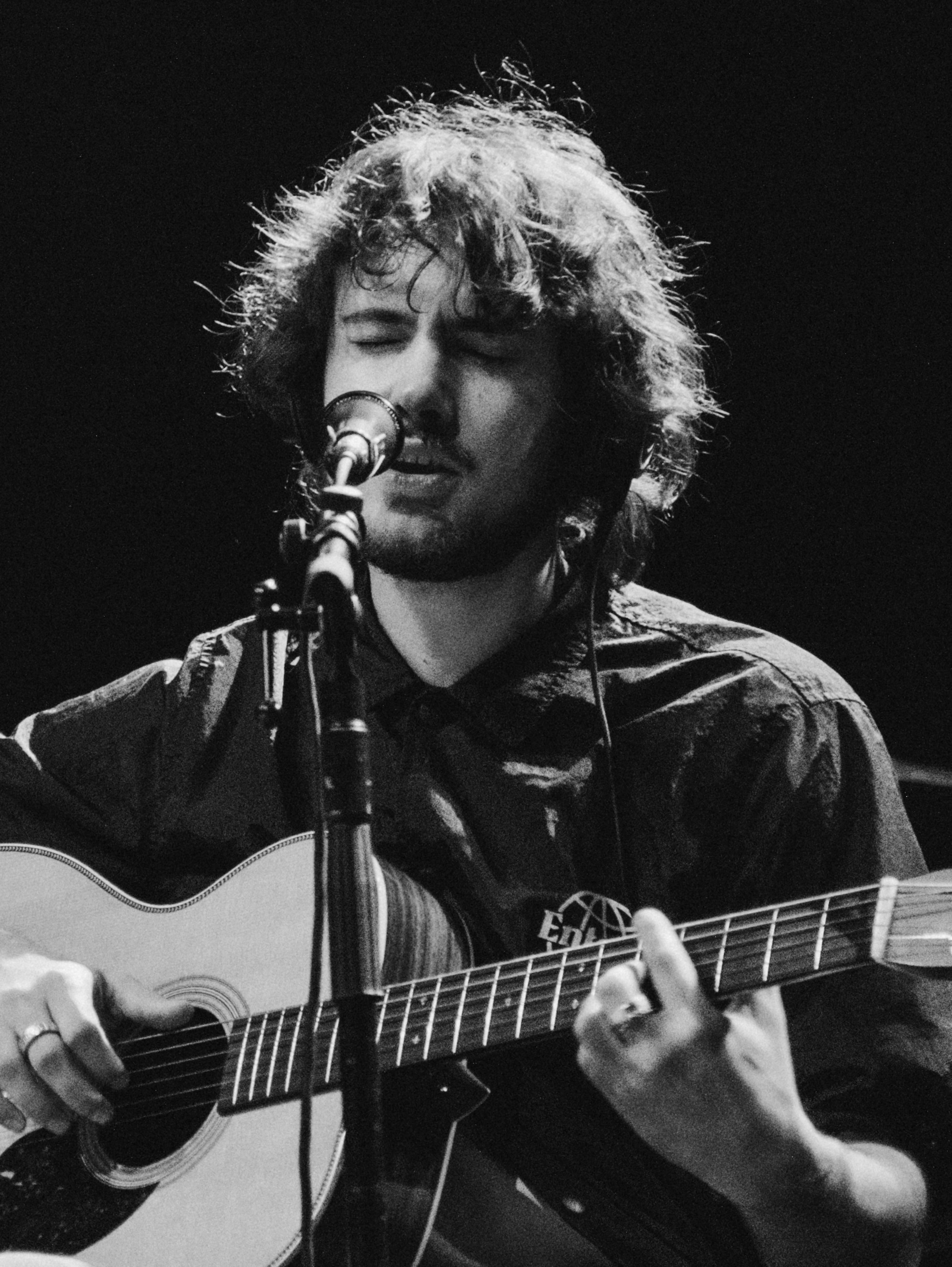
Quadeca performing in 2024

Vanisher, Horizon Scraper is a folktronica album with elements of electronica, experimental hip-hop, and art pop. It is 69 minutes long and there are fourteen tracks on the album, with three guest appearances from Danny Brown, Olēka, and Maruja. First conceptualized in January 2023 and worked on alongside Scrapyard, Quadeca produced and wrote the whole album, also playing the guitar, bass, piano, synthesizer, percussion, and drums. He was inspired by Brazilian bossa nova and rapper M.I.A. during the album's production, stating the latter combined electronic hip-hop with drums from Southeast Asia and Africa. In its production, Quadeca revealed on Clash that he made "hundreds of final versions" of his tracks and showed them to his friends by asking which version they prefer.

Compared to I Didn't Mean to Haunt You, which is based on a ghost in purgatory and themes of suicide ideation, Vanisher, Horizon Scraper is a "more complicated album, more existential, a bit more whimsical and fun too", based on love, isolation, and identity as an artist according to Quadeca. Narratively, the concept album is based on a sailor whose obsession motivates them to sail the sea, going on a voyage before his demise in the ocean, akin to Moby-Dick. Quadeca's motive on choosing the sea as the album's narrative theme is based on the idea of a person facing something bigger than themselves and having "no control over", describing it as not just capturing the spirit of freedom, but the "scary, angry, and lost" aspect of alienation. He also described the album in an interview with WUNC as a "metaphorical, metaphysical journey or chasing something that you can never reach, and losing yourself in the process". Juan Gutierrez of Flood Magazine described it as a blend of "dark, folky soundscapes" with electronic production.

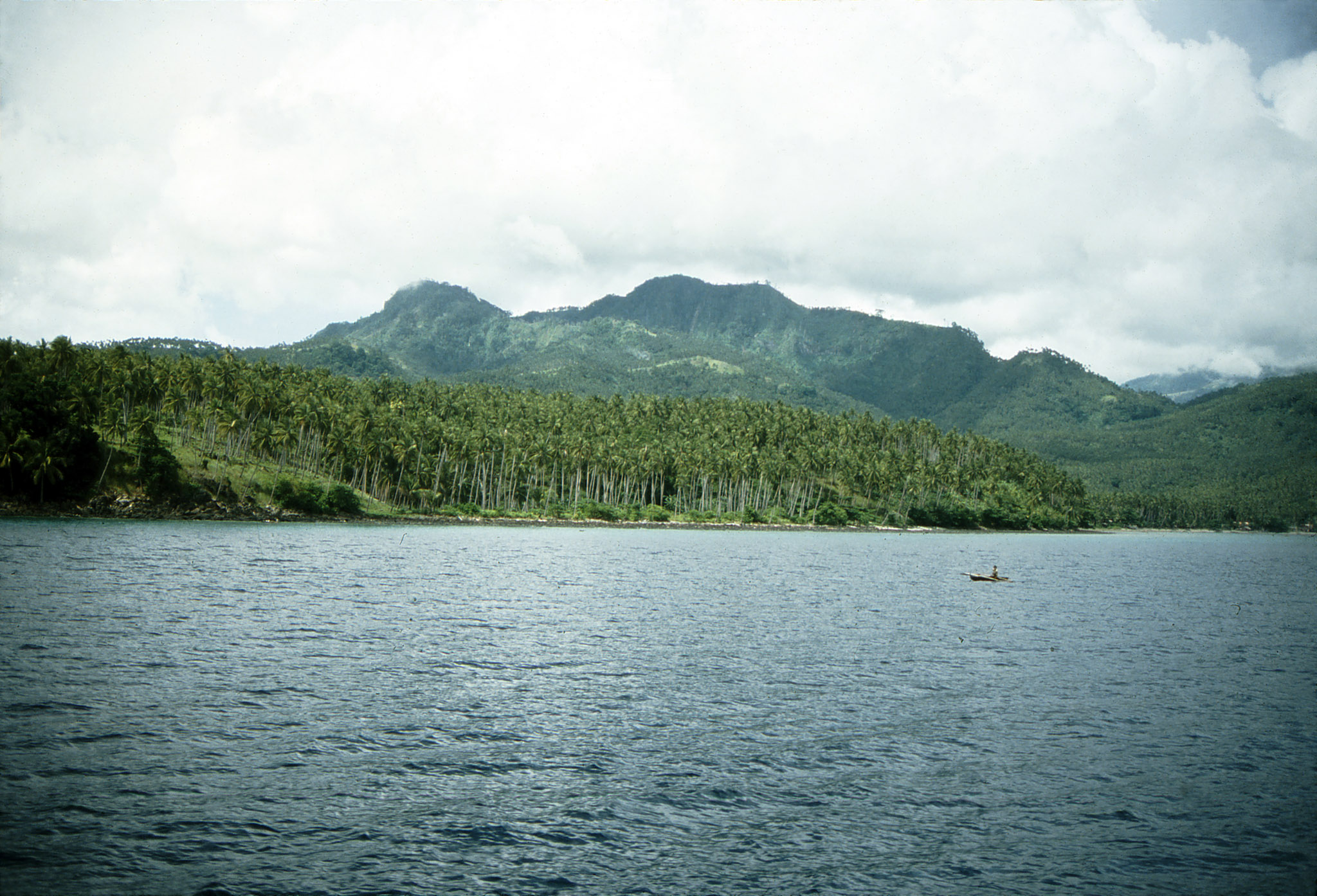
An extinct volcano at Camiguin, a small island in the Philippines, where part of the visual album was filmed.

For the album's visual complement, Quadeca learned how to sail before filming. He directed, wrote, edited, and starred in the 67-minute production. With the help of Oregon-based photographer Brendon Burton, it was filmed at Camiguin, a small island in the Philippines. Quadeca's inspiration to filming location was inspired by the Sunken Cemetery, submerged in water after the eruption of Mount Vulcan on May 1, 1871, causing the tides to overtake and sink it. He described it as "surreal", "sad", and "apocalyptic", qualities that he associated with the place where the album concludes. Quadeca and his team filmed in Greece and Oregon, also taking photographs for the album's photo book complement. Thematically, the film progresses from daybreak to midnight, and associates individual tracks with specific colors. For example, "Casper" is represented by red and orange, "Waging War" by blue and purple, "Godstained" by orange and yellow, and "No Questions Asked" by yellow and blue. Quadeca considered that his motive for making films based on his albums is to "bring all of the images in my head" so viewers can comprehend his concepts more. He also recorded multiple audio recordings while on sail and sampled various YouTube videos of ocean noises.

Despite being a concept album, Paste emphasized that every track is based on contrasts and collage rather than "continuity and sonic adhesion". Quadeca wanted to use the sea voyage narrative as a canvas for exploration in each track similar to Scrapyard. During the album's production, Quadeca used various samples and ideas from a folder, and was inspired to combine world music with pop and hip-hop influences. Similar to the process of I Didn't Mean to Haunt You, Quadeca did not listen to Vanisher, Horizon Scraper from front to back until it was finished, when "every song had its spot". Learning from the experience from working on his previous album, it influenced him to make sure every song is final, as he became more sensitive about their execution.

=== Tracks 1–7 ===
"Godstained"
"Godstained" blends acoustic music with R&B, bossa nova and jazz between the melodies and chord progressions.

Opening the album, "No Questions Asked" loops the first three seconds of Chico Buarque's 1971 album Construção, accompanied by an acoustic instrumental arrangement with multitracked vocal harmonies in a way inspired by classical and electronic music. In the track, the line "I'll be there when no one is" is repeated as the song ends with sound effects of waves crashing on the shore, emphasizing the album's theme of a voyager crossing the sea. It is also the first track Quadeca recorded for the album. "Waging War" features Olēka and is built on flute, string, and piano instrumentation. The track progresses with synth music and surrealism onto a final rap verse where Quadeca raps about the choice of life over death.

"Ruin My Life" is an experimental acoustic ballad in triple metre (3/4), based on themes of youth, love, and mortality, expressed through lyrics, such as: "Might have to ruin my life to make it mine". Its bridge is led by Harry Wilkinson from the English rock band Maruja as the strings gradually become more frantic. "Godstained" blends its acoustic sound with bossa nova and jazz between the melodies and chord progressions, also containing woodwind instruments. In the track, Quadeca sings about finding a message in a bottle at sea, only to find it lacking significance. Transitioning seamlessly onto the fifth track, "At a Time Like This" shows a cloud rap sound with multi-tracked vocals and woodwind instruments, filling in with horns and swirling arpeggios. "Monday" is an avant-pop and baroque pop ballad. "Dancing Without Moving" mixes baroque pop with hip-hop, with the lyrics being about going through regrets and rejections while his voice flows front and center.

=== Tracks 8–14 ===
"That's Why"
"That's Why" uses two vocal tracks panned in both sides to "mimic someone screaming" on a deck.

"Casper"
"Casper", a post-rock and art punk track, portrays Harry Wilkinson from Maruja as God, while the melodies of "No Questions Asked" play in the background.

"That's Why" resembles a fusion of hip-hop and indie pop. Layered with strings, the track progresses the album's introspection in a dark tone, continuing themes of existential crisis from the previous track. It was recorded with two vocals panned to both sides to "mimic someone screaming" on a deck. In addition, "That's Why" samples "Samoa", a 70s erotic film track composed by Baldan Bembo. Following the ninth track, "I Dream About Sinking", an instrumental interlude, "Natural Causes" features Quadeca singing about escaping a psychic torment he can not get out of.

"Thundrrr" is an experimental hip-hop track that contains oversaturated vocals and distorted sound effects, marking a turning point on the album where Quadeca is uncertain about his journey. "The Great Bakunawa" features Detroit-based rapper Danny Brown rapping from the viewpoint of a Bakunawa dragon, a serpent in Philippine mythology, under harsh textures and a bossa nova drum sample time-stretched and compressed. During production, after Quadeca showed Brown "all of the Bakunawa lore", he wrote and recorded his verse in three takes by the next morning. "Forgone" marks a contrast to its two previous tracks, reminiscent of a sad piano ballad under orchestral production.

The final track, "Casper", contains melodies from its first track, "No Questions Asked". "Casper" evolves into an "experimental post-rock art punk rager" with Harry Wilkinson from Maruja as a guest artist where he portrays God and Quadeca accepts his death. In the track's production, Quadeca made the outro, which concludes with a sound of water swallowing and spitting him out, and initially wrote a spoken-word segment for the track, but was not "believable enough" to him. He sent the song directly to Maruja, asking if they wanted to record the segment.

== Promotion and release ==
Quadeca first teased Vanisher, Horizon Scraper in February 2024, at the end of the music video for "Way Too Many Friends" from his mixtape Scrapyard. On March 25, 2025, he officially released the album's lead single, "Godstained", alongside a music video in which he portrays himself as a sailor. On April 22, he released the second single, "Monday", with an accompanying music video. The same day, he announced a headlining US tour in support of Vanisher, Horizon Scraper, which began in October and concluded in November. On June 11, he revealed the album's cover art, designed by Digiyams. The following day, he released the album's third single, "Forgone", alongside a music video, and announced that the album would be released in July, also announcing that Vanisher, Horizon Scraper would be available to order digitally, as well as on vinyl, CD, and cassette, via Quadeca's official website.

On June 16, a UK and EU leg of the "Vanisher, Horizon Scraper Tour" was announced, which occurred in December. On July 21, Quadeca premiered the album's accompaniment film at Nitehawk Cinema in New York City. On July 25, Vanisher, Horizon Scraper was released by Quadeca's record label, X8 Music, to streaming services, vinyl, cassette, and CD. The visual film was also released on Quadeca's YouTube channel the same day. In vinyl prints, the album has multiple variants, each having exclusive tracks on their D-sides. His website also sold collectible items including a cap, flag, compass, necklace, photo book, and Bakunawa plushie with a soundbox. On February 3, 2026, Quadeca released an "extended cut" version of Vanisher, Horizon Scraper, featuring five additional tracks.

== Reception ==
Professional ratings
Review scores
Source	Rating
The Needle Drop	8/10 (Note: Specifically, Fantano rated the album a "light decent 8".)
Paste	6/10
Pitchfork	6.7/10
The Rice Thresher	4/5 stars
Spill	4/5 stars

Vanisher, Horizon Scraper has been met with generally positive reviews from critics. Anthony Fantano from The Needle Drop considered the album be Quadeca's most ambitious and noted it to feature his "best" songwriting and production. Fantano concluded the review by stating that it was an album he saw himself "coming back to numerous tracks from". Arman Savena of The Rice Thresher praised the Vanisher, Horizon Scraper for its experimental production, themes of self-discovery and emotional reckoning, and the vulnerable weight in Quadeca's songwriting.

Ljubinko Zivkovic of Spill considered Vanisher, Horizon Scraper to be complicated on paper, but is not in "the mind and hands of Quadeca" though sophisticated melodies and production arrangements. Kieran Press-Reynolds of Pitchfork commended the album's ability to manipulate and combine different music styles in one as well as its emotional depth, however, they considered Quadeca's songwriting to be a weak aspect of Vanisher, Horizon Scraper. Desmond Leake of Paste noted that "most of these production tricks become less appealing as the album drags on".

Commercially, Vanisher, Horizon Scraper charted on two Billboard charts with Independent Albums at number 39 and Top Album Sales at number 13, while peaking at number 21 on the North American College and Community Radio Chart. It also performed on two UK charts with Albums Sales at number 24 and Independent Albums at number 13. In Scotland, it charted on the Scottish Albums chart at number 19.

== Track listing ==
All tracks are written and produced by Benjamin Lasky, unless noted otherwise. All tracks are stylized in all caps.

Standard edition
No.	Title	Writer(s)	Producer(s)	Length
1.	"No Questions Asked"	Lasky; Autumn Beviacqua; Chico Buarque	Lasky; Johan Lenox	6:00
2.	"Waging War" (with Olēka)	Lasky; Olēka		5:15
3.	"Ruin My Life"	Lasky; Fahem Erfan		4:42
4.	"Godstained"	Lasky; Beviacqua		3:25
5.	"At a Time Like This"			4:37
6.	"Monday"	Lasky; Johnny May	Lasky; May	4:04
7.	"Dancing Without Moving"			3:19
8.	"That's Why"	Lasky; Alberto Bembo		4:29
9.	"I Dream About Sinking"			3:55
10.	"Natural Causes"		Lasky; Lenox	3:50
11.	"Thundrrr"		Lasky; Noah Ehler	4:40
12.	"The Great Bakunawa" (with Danny Brown)	Lasky; Danny Brown	Lasky; Lenox	5:40
13.	"Forgone"			7:54
14.	"Casper" (with Maruja)	Lasky; Harry Wilkinson; Joe Carroll; Matt Buonaccorsi; Jacob Hayes		7:34
Total length:				69:24

=== The Extended Cut ===
All tracks written and produced by Benjamin Lasky, unless noted otherwise. All tracks are stylized in all caps excluding songs 17–19 which are in lowercase.

Disc One:
No.	Title	Length
3.	"Learning to Swim"	4:50
14.	"Melisa"	3:36

Disc Two:
No.	Title	Writer(s)	Length
17.	"I. Finale"		7:11
18.	"II. À Noite"	Lasky; Erfan	7:46
19.	"III. Accordion's Remorse"	Lasky; rozey	8:00
Total length:			100:47

== Personnel ==
Credits are adapted from Tidal and the album's liner notes.

- Quadeca – production, mixing, mastering, guitar (all tracks); vocals (tracks 1–8, 10–14, 3a, 14a); piano, synthesizer (1–5, 7–13); percussion (1–3, 5, 7, 8, 10–13), bass (1, 3, 5, 7, 8, 10, 11); arrangement, strings (2); drums (4); cello, guitar synthesizer (6)
- Olēka – background vocals (1, 13), vocals (2, 4, 7, 14), flute (4, 6–8, 14)
- Fahem Erfan – guitar (1, 3, 4), composer (18)
- Johnny May – strings (1, 3, 6–8, 12, 3a), piano (6, 12), production (6), cello (9), synthesizer (12)
- Joshua Rubin – clarinet (1, 9, 11, 13)
- Myles Martin – drums (2, 4, 6–9, 13, 14a)
- Johan Lenox – production (2, 10, 12), strings (2), piano (12)
- Harry Wilkinson – vocals (3, 7, 12)
- Noah Ehler – guitar (4, 11, 13), bass (4), production (11), strings (13)
- Sam Arnold – bass (7)
- Danny Brown – vocals (12)
- Maruja – vocals, bass, drums, guitar, saxophone (14)
- Rozey – composer, lyricist, accordion (19)
- Digiyams – cover art, graphics
- Joseph Pepin – management
- Jesse Taconelli – A&R

== Charts ==
Chart performance for Vanisher, Horizon Scraper
Chart (2025)	Peak position
Scottish Albums (Official Charts)	19
UK Albums Sales (Official Charts)	24
UK Independent Albums (Official Charts)	13
US Top Album Sales (Billboard)	13
US Independent Albums (Billboard)	39
US & Canadian College Radio Top 200 (NACC)	21
