= Geezer (group) =

American musical superduo

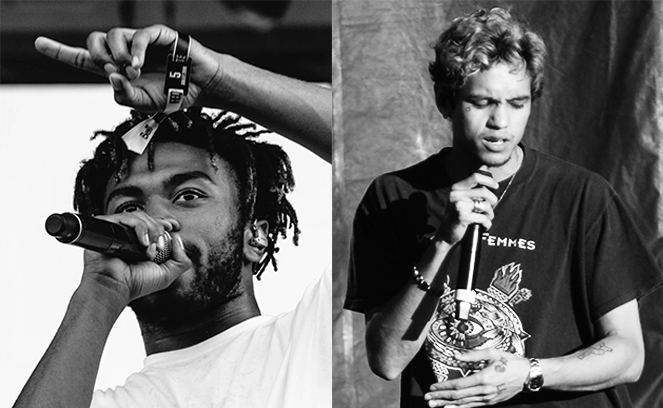
- Kevin Abstract (left) and Dominic Fike (right), the two members of Geezer

Background information
- Origin: Houston, Texas
- Genres: Hip-hop; pop rap; indie rock
- Years active: 2025–present
- Labels: Juno; X8; Virgin
- Spinoff of: Blush
- Members: Kevin Abstract; Dominic Fike

Geezer are an American musical superduo, consisting of rappers and singers Kevin Abstract and Dominic Fike. Prior to forming a duo, the two were frequent collaborators during Abstract's tenure as a member of rap group Brockhampton. In 2025, Abstract founded the Houston-based collective Blush, which debuted on his studio album of the same name. Fike was announced as a member of Blush and appeared on the album. Prior to the release of the album, Fike and Abstract were identified as a subgroup within Blush.

On July 9, 2025, the duo released their debut single, "Doggy", featuring fellow Blush members Love Spells and Truly Young.

== History ==
=== 2019–2024: Early collaborations ===
Abstract, at the time the de-facto leader of hip-hop group Brockhampton became familiar with Fike after seeing a photo of Fike's mugshot posted online, resulting in him reaching out to Fike to collaborate. Abstract publicly co-signed Fike after the official release of his debut extended play, Don't Forget About Me, Demos, in October 2018. On April 4, 2019, Fike appeared in "This is Dominic Fike", an interview with Fike that was hosted by Abstract and posted on the Brockhampton YouTube channel, doubling as a music video for Fike's debut single "3 Nights".

The first recorded collaboration between the two was "Peach", a single from Abstract's third studio album Arizona Baby, released on April 24, 2019, alongside a music video. Fike also contributed vocals to "Crumble", the penultimate track on the album. On August 23rd, Fike opened for Brockhampton at Friday Therapy, a one-off concert in Los Angeles held on the release date of the fifth Brockhampton album Ginger. Fike performed an opening set at the concert, and joined Brockhampton for a performance of "Peach". On June 21st, 2020, Abstract interviewed Fike again, this time in promotion of Fike's debut studio album What Could Possibly Go Wrong. On April 13, 2021, Brockhampton released the Abstract-directed music video for their single "Count On Me", starring Fike and Lil Nas X as lovers on a psychedelic road trip. On April 13, 2024, Fike made a surprise appearance during Abstract's set at the 2024 Coachella festival, performing "Peach" and "Crumble".

=== 2025–present: Blush and forming Geezer ===
In 2025, Abstract moved back to Houston, Texas, and formed the musical collective Blush, consisting of a combination of Houston natives and Abstract's past collaborators. On June 6, Abstract released a music video for the single "Geezer", confirming that Fike was a member of Blush, and indicating that he and Abstract formed a subgroup, also named Geezer. "Geezer" was the first single for Abstract's fifth studio album, Blush (2025). Aside from appearing on "Geezer", Fike performs the track "Maroon". On July 9, the formation of Geezer was made official, with the release of Geezer's first official release, "Doggy", featuring Blush members Love Spells and Truly Young. (Note: Although Fike and Abstract previously released the collaborative songs "Geezer" and "Maroon", "Doggy" was the first that credited the two as Geezer.)

The duo performed together for the first time at the 2025 Camp Flog Gnaw Carnival, on November 23.

== Discography ==
=== Singles ===
List of singles showing year released and album name
Title	Year	Album
"Geezer" (Note: Upon its initial release, "Geezer" was credited to Fike and Abstract as individuals. After the release of "Doggy", "Geezer" was retroactively credited to the group.)	2025	Blush
"Doggy" (featuring Love Spells and Truly Young)	2025	Blush

=== Appearances together ===
List of collaborations, denoting titles, year released, album, and credited artists
Year	Title	Album	Artist(s)	Notes
2019	"Peach"	Arizona Baby	Kevin Abstract	Fike contributes guitar and uncredited guest vocals, along with Joba and Bearface
2019	"Crumble"	Arizona Baby	Kevin Abstract	Fike is an uncredited guest performer, along with Ryan Beatty and Jack Antonoff
2025	"Maroon"	Blush	Kevin Abstract and Dominic Fike	Although the track is credited to both, Fike is the sole performer
