= Junior Varsity (band) =

American indie rock band

- Origin: New York City, U.S.
- Genres: Alternative rock; indie; punk; alt-pop
- Years active: 2019–present
- Labels: Warner Records; Key Records
- Members: Greg Varteresian; Zach Michel
- Past members: Brooke Danaher
- Website: aliveandextremelyhealthy.com

Junior Varsity is an American alternative pop band. Initially formed in 2019 as a duo comprising singer Greg Varteresian and multi-instrumentalist Zach Michel, the group released their first music in 2021 and later added Brooke Danaher to the band as another lead singer.

== History ==
=== 2019–2022: Formation, live shows and first EPs ===
The initial duo of Greg Varteresian (formerly Greg Aram) and multi-instrumentalist Zach Michel first met as students at New York University, initially putting out their own music individually. They formed a band in 2019, leaving New York for Los Angeles the same year. They attempted to grow a fan base in both these cities through a series of three-night live shows which they called "A Fucking Weekend," involving other acts Jean Dawson and Quiet Luke. Varteresian has said that the presentation of the shows as "a party" rather than simply "a show" allowed their audience at the shows to grow quickly, and that this allowed them to sign deal with Warner Records. During the COVID-19 lockdowns, they spent their time writing and recording songs. They gained over 15,000 followers on Instagram without releasing any music until 2021, only releasing short snippets of their songs on social media.

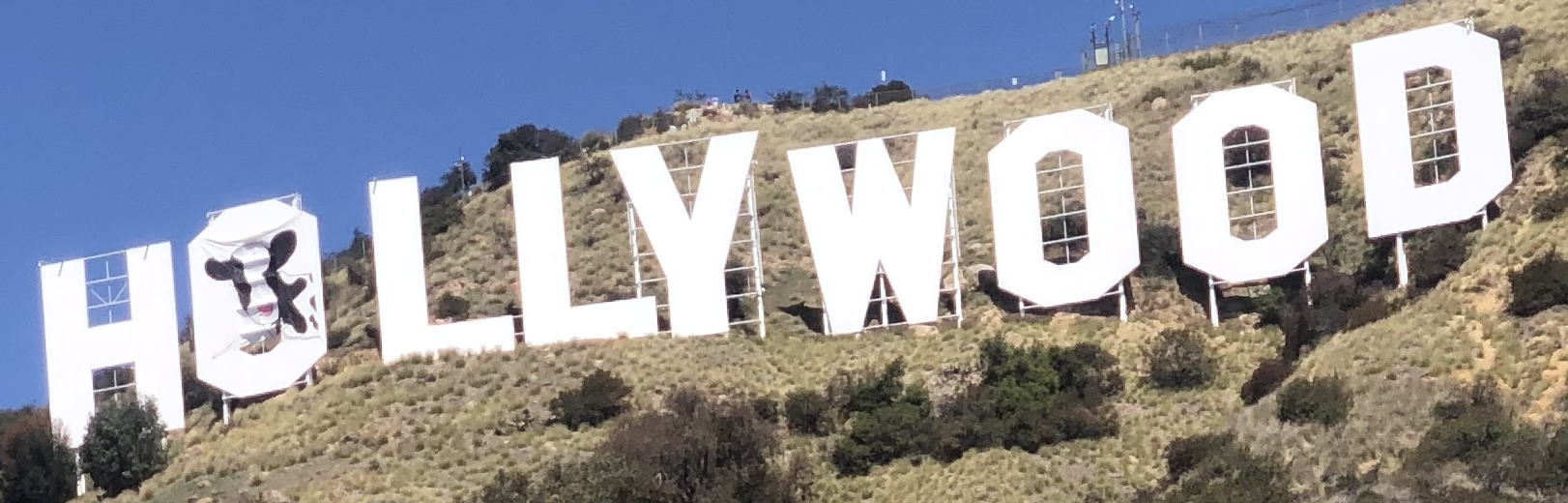
A cow painting draped over the first "O" of the Hollywood Sign promoted the band's first single, "Cold Blood", in 2021.

On April 2, 2021, the band's visual artist Danny Cole, photographer Landon Yost and singer-songwriter Greg Varteresian draped a painting of a "holy cow" across the first "O" of the Hollywood Sign. The cow had been painted by Cole, and it was later decided that this image would be used to represent the band. Varteresian has stated that the placement of the painting took 8 minutes, involving the use of climbing gear, and that he rolled or broke his ankle while running from the police. They were charged with a misdemeanor for trespassing, and were bailed out by Stefan Max, a Warner Records A&R executive. The same day, the duo released its debut single, "Cold Blood", about Varteresian's experience of being tased by a police officer while out with friends, and its music video which depicted the duo driving past a man on fire and walking among a field of cows. The Los Angeles Times described the song as "a work of dark comedy", and The Line of Best Fit said it was a "perfect clash of alternative and hip hop with plenty of lo-fi fuzz." They debuted their first self-titled EP in 2021.

Their second EP, SIDE B, was released in 2022.

=== 2023–24: Addition of Danaher and My Star ===
The group dropped Warner Records after their release of SIDE B, and recruited a new lead vocalist, Brooke Danaher, after having the "idea of adding a girl to the band" and first meeting her in Echo Park after being introduced by a mutual friend and bonding over music from the "early iPod era." Danaher had previously released music under the name Deborah's Child . While the original duo had some material ready for the new alternative pop sound of the band, the addition of Danaher convinced them to start from a blank slate.

They released their EP My Star in 2024 under Key Records. The EP involved a dichotomy between Danaher and Varteresian's voices, inspired by the xx's interchanging verses as well as bands like the Ting Tings; they stated that "no one ha[d] done [this dichotomy] on a mainstream level since the mid-2000s that we liked." Stereogum responded that "Danaher’s cheery ad-libs and airy tone add dimension to Varteresian’s deep monotone, creating a lively interplay absent in their earlier work."

=== 2025–26: Ready ===
The band released the single "Radio" in April 2026. On May 1, the group released their next EP, Ready. It has been marketed as a side A to a wider project, with a side B to be released later in the year. The band no longer lists Danaher as a member; the vocals for the EP aside from Varteresian and Michel were performed by guest features Oxis, Lola Blue, The Teenagers, and Unflirt.

== Discography ==
=== EPs ===
- Junior Varsity (2021)
- SIDE B (2022)
- My Star (2024)
- Ready (2026)

=== Singles ===
- "Cold Blood" (2021)
- "New York" (2024)
- "Radio" (2026)
