= Love spell =

Love spell may refer to:

- Love magic, a type of magic
- Love Spells (born 2004 or 2005), American musician and singer-songwriter
- Love Spell, a Philippine TV series
- Lovespell, a 1981 fantasy romantic tragedy film
- Love Spell, an imprint of the American publisher Dorchester Publishing
- Love Spell, a 2007 album by Sifow
- "Love Spell", a song by GFriend from their 2020 album Walpurgis Night
