= MTV1987 =

Studio album by Kevin Abstract
- Released: July 15, 2014
- Genres: Pop; alternative hip-hop; alternative R&B
- Length: 52:27
- Label: Self-released
- Producers: Ian Simpson (exec.); Romil Hemnani (also exec.); Russell Boring; James Francos; Neil Hemnani; Kiko Merley; Robert Ontenient; Rex

Kevin Abstract chronology
MTV1987 (2014)	American Boyfriend: A Suburban Love Story (2016)

Singles from MTV1987
- 1. "Save" Released: April 1, 2014; 2. "Drugs" Released: May 4, 2014

MTV1987 is the debut studio album by American recording artist Kevin Abstract, released on July 15, 2014. As of November 2018, it has been removed from most major download and streaming services.

== Background ==
Kevin Abstract began writing and recording his debut album MTV1987 near the end of 2013, soon after the release of his first self-titled EP. It was recorded in just under six months of constant studio sessions with his in-house record producer, Romil. MTV1987 is a conceptual album that fuses elements of past and present pop culture with the setting of the predominantly digital age we currently live in today. The album itself describes Kevin's life. The overall sound of the album was inspired by artists such as: Kid Cudi, Frank Ocean, Justin Timberlake, Crystal Castles and Britney Spears.

== Reception ==
Upon release, MTV1987 was met with critical acclaim and was praised for its experimental nature as well as the overall catchy pop tone it manages to consistently maintain. The album was posted on popular music sites such as Billboard, Complex, Spin, 2DopeBoyz, and Pigeons & Planes. The album ranked at #38 on Spin's "Top 40 Hip-hop Albums of 2014" list as well as #31 on Pigeons & Planes' list of "Top 50 Best Albums of 2014"

== Track listing ==
No.	Title	Writer(s)	Producer(s)	Length
1.	"Dad"	Ian Simpson	Romil Hemnani	1:07
2.	"Save"	Simpson	Hemnani	3:31
3.	"Hell / Heroina"	Simpson	Hemnani; Kiko Merley ("Hell"); Robert Ontenient ("Heroina")	6:58
4.	"27"	Simpson; Jack Larsen	Hemnani	4:17
5.	"Drugs"	Simpson	Hemnani	6:53
6.	"Mom"	Simpson	Hemnani	1:05
7.	"Tame Cab"	Simpson; Shaamir; Ameer Vann	Hemnani; Rex Roemer; Russell "Joba" Boring	6:20
8.	"Degas Park"	Simpson; Merlyn Wood	Hemnani	4:21
9.	"Snakes" (featuring Matt Champion)	Simpson; Champion	Hemnani	6:54
10.	"Rush"	Simpson; Boring; Neil Hemnani	Hemnani	4:41
11.	"Camp Green Lake"	Simpson	Hemnani; Frames Janco	4:50
12.	"Drug Dealer"	Simpson	Hemnani	1:44
Total length:				52:27

Notes

- ^{^[a]} signifies an additional writer / producer.
- "Dad" features additional vocals by Ian's Dad.
- "Save" features additional vocals by Lontalius.
- "27" features additional vocals by Jack Larsen.
- "Drugs" and "Tame Cab" feature additional vocals by Russell Boring.
- "Mom" features additional vocals by Ian's Mom.
- "Snakes" features additional vocals by Frank X.
- "Drug Dealer" features additional vocals by Drug Dealer.

Sample credits

- "Dad" and "Mom" contain samples of "Sandy", performed by Whirr.
- "Save" contains a sample of "The Krockadile", performed by King Krule.
- "Hell" contains a sample of "Untrust Us", performed by Crystal Castles.
- "Tame Cab" contains a sample of "When the Levee Breaks", performed by Led Zeppelin.
- "Camp Green Lake" contains a sample of "Keep Digging", performed by Kermoadi.

== Personnel ==
- Russell Boring – mixing, mastering, additional vocals (tracks 5, 7), additional production (track 7, 10)
- Matt Champion – featured artist (track 9), writer (track 9)
- Drug Dealer – additional vocals (track 12)
- Frames Janco – production (track 11), guitar (track 7)
- Frank X – additional vocals (track 9)
- Neil Hemnani – additional production (track 10)
- HK Covers – creative direction, graphic design
- Ian's Dad – additional vocals (track 1)
- Ian's Mom – additional vocals (track 6)
- Kiko Merley – additional production (track 3)
- Jack Larsen – additional vocals (track 4), additional writing (track 4)
- Lontalius – additional vocals (track 2)
- Robert Ontenient – additional production (track 3)
- Shaamir – additional writing (track 7)
- Rex – co-production (track 7)
- Romil Hemnani – executive production, creative direction, production (tracks 1–12)
- Ian "Kevin Abstract" Simpson – executive production, creative direction, lead artist, writer (tracks 1–12)
- Quiet Luke – guitar (track 3)
- Ameer Vann – additional writing (track 7)
- Sage Williams – featured artist (track 10)
- William Wood – additional writing (track 8)
