= Blush (Kevin Abstract album) =

Studio album by Kevin Abstract
- Released: June 27, 2025
- Genre: Hip-hop
- Length: 48:27
- Labels: Virgin; X8; Juno
- Producers: 40hrz; Kevin Abstract; Daniel Aged; AJ; Rob Bisel; Roy Blair; Fahem Efram; Elie; Dominic Fike; Romil Hemnani; Henry Kwapis; Jared; Jonnywood; Jordon; Joshy; Macshooter; Devan Manley; Angel Carrasco; Kiko Merley; Olivia Lattore; Plantcham; Quadeca; Ryan Raines; Ross; Splitted Stupid; Jim-E Stack; TEYKO; Sheldon Wells; Wizzle; Devin Workman

Kevin Abstract chronology
Blanket (2023)	Blush (2025)	Honey in My Hair (2026)

Singles from Blush
- 1. "Geezer" Released: June 13, 2025; 2. "Doggy" Released: July 9, 2025

Blush is the fifth studio album by American rapper Kevin Abstract, released on June 27, 2025, through Virgin Records, X8, and Abstract's label Juno. Although marketed as Abstract's fifth solo album, the project sees Abstract take on a curation role, with the album featuring a multitude of collaborators. Abstract himself does not appear on every track.

Executive produced by Abstract and frequent collaborator Quadeca, the album also features extensive contributions by a roster of Houston-based musicians, also referred to as Blush, as both performers and producers. Blush has no fixed membership or structure, which Abstract has compared to the Warhol superstars or an ensemble cast. Production is primarily handled by Abstract and Devan Manley, with additional contributions by Quadeca, Kiko Merley, AJ, and several others. roro, SoGone SoFlexy, Ameer Vann, Love Spells, E Bleu, Danny Brown, Makana XO, Truly Young, Diego, Drigo, JPEGMafia, Sekou, Dominic Fike, Derby, and Quadeca appear as guest performers.

Blush marked the debut of Geezer, a superduo consisting of Abstract and Fike. On July 8, 2025, Abstract announced that he was working on a follow-up to the album.

Professional ratings
Review scores
Source	Rating
Clash	8/10

== Background and recording ==
Abstract and Quadeca met online in 2023, resulting in Abstract contributing to Quadeca's fifth mixtape Scrapyard. In 2024, Quadeca significantly contributed to Abstract's unreleased project Glue, which was partially released in the form of YouTube and SoundCloud uploads, but was never officially released on streaming platforms.

Following a breakup, Abstract moved back to Houston and began working on Blush in early 2025, along with a collective of Houston-based musicians and friends. After Abstract sent Quadeca an early draft of the album, he became involved as an executive producer, resulting in several Glue tracks being added to the project. While Abstract and the rest of the performers and producers worked on the project in Houston, Quadeca worked on the album remotely, which he credited with allowing him to make cuts and changes without worrying about the performers reactions.

In contrast to his previous solo records, Blush features Abstract as a curator rather than the sole performer, similarly to Dr. Dre on Dr. Dre Presents: The Aftermath. Many of the performers, who Abstract also refers to as Blush, were recruited by Abstract on the internet, including Love Spells. Ameer Vann became attached after Abstract relocated to Houston, which Abstract credits as rekindling their relationship following Vann's firing from Brockhampton. Abstract and Dominic Fike had previously collaborated on Abstract's third studio album Arizona Baby (2019). Danny Brown appears on his own track on the album, which was likened to Common's appearance on Kanye West's Late Registration (2005).

== Promotion and release ==
In May, Abstract began posting cryptic images to his Instagram, featuring pictures of his friends and collaborators with the text "June 2025" attached. These images seemingly confirmed upcoming collaborations with Quadeca, JPEGMafia, Love Spells, and Ameer Vann, marking Vann & Abstract's first collaboration since Vann's removal from Brockhampton in 2018. On May 29, Abstract unofficially released the standalone single "Ghetto Graduation", in collaboration with Vann and Lil Saint. On June 8, Abstract released a demo tape consisting of cut tracks from the album on his Discord server. Throughout promotion, Abstract streamed previews of the album on Twitch. On June 6, Abstract officially announced Blush for a June 27 release, and simultaneously released the music video for "Geezer", a collaboration with Dominic Fike. "Geezer" was officially released as the first single on June 13. On July 9, after Blush had already been released, Abstract and Fike formalized their relationship under the duo Geezer, and released their debut single, "Doggy" with Love Spells and Truly Young, the same day. "Doggy" was added to the track list of Blush on streaming services on July 22.

== Track listing ==
Blush track listing
No.	Title	Writer(s)	Producer(s)	Length
1.	"The Introduction" (performed by roro)	roro; Noah	Kevin Abstract; TEYKO	0:19
2.	"H-Town" (with SoGone SoFlexy, Ameer Vann, and Love Spells)	Kevin Abstract; Immondre Goss; Kiko Merley; SoGone SoFlexy; Ameer Vann	Abstract; Merley; Devan Manley; Olivia Lattore; Plantcham	3:04
3.	"Copy" (with E Bleu, SoGone SoFlexy, and Love Spells)	Abstract; Goss; Jabari; Love Spells; Merley; SoGone SoFlexy	Abstract; Roy Blair; Manley; Fahem Efram	2:43
4.	"Danny's Track" (performed by Danny Brown)	Danny Brown	Merley; Jordon; Abstract	0:52
5.	"Yoko Ono" (with Love Spells and Makana XO)	Abstract; Makana XO; Merley; Love Spells	Abstract; Merley; AJ; Jared; Manley; Sheldon Wells	2:59
6.	"NOLA" (with Truly Young, Love Spells, Diego, Drigo, JPEGMafia, Ameer Vann, & Quadeca)	Abstract; Diego; Drigo; JPEGMafia; Love Spells; Truly Young; Vann	Quadeca	3:11
7.	"Post Break Up Beauty" (with Love Spells)	Abstract; Cole Bat	Carrasco; Romil Hemnani; Rob Bisel; Manley; Efram	2:52
8.	"97 Jag" (with Love Spells)	Abstract; Goss; Love Spells; Saint	Abstract; AJ; Manley; Wells; Splitted Stupid; Efram	2:49
9.	"Text Me" (with Sekou)	Abstract; Bat	Abstract; Hemnani; Manley	2:26
10.	"Geezer" (performed by Geezer (Note: Abstract and Fike are credited both as Geezer and individuals on "Geezer" and "Doggy"))	Abstract; Dominic Fike; Henry Kwapis; Jim-E Stack; Ryan Raines	Fike; Kwapis; Stack; Ryan; Angel Carrasco; Raines; Devin Workman	2:49
11.	"I Wasn't There" (performed by Derby)	Derby	Derby; Abstract; AJ; Manley	2:07
12.	"Blush Interlude"	Abstract; Quadeca	Quadeca; Abstract	1:28
13.	"Maroon" (performed by Dominic Fike)	Carrasco	Workman; Daniel Aged	3:29
14.	"Pop Out" (performed by Ameer Vann, Drigo, E Bleu, Devan, and Love Spells)	Abstract; Drigo; E Bleu; Love Spells; Manly; Vann	Manley; Abstract; AJ; Wizzle; Ross; Elie; Joshy; Merley; 40hrz; Quadeca	3:21
15.	"Doggy" (performed by Geezer, Love Spells, and Truly Young)	Fike; Abstract; Love Spells; Saint; Young	AJ; Workman; Efram; Carrasco; Abstract; Macshooter	2:52
16.	"Girlfriend" (with Drigo, Love Spells, and Truly Young)	Abstract; Drigo; E Bleu; Saint; Young	Abstact; AJ; Manley; 40hrz	3:02
17.	"Bloom" (with Love Spells and Ameer Vann)	Abstract; E Bleu; Love Spells; Vann	Abstract; AJ; Manley; Wizzle; 40hrz; Merley	2:06
18.	"Abandon Me" (performed by Quadeca)	Quadeca	Quadeca	2:40
19.	"Red Light" (with Quadeca and Ameer Vann)	Abstract; Cole Bat; Quadeca; Vann	Quadeca	3:08
Total length:				48:27

- "Doggy" was added to the digital edition of the album on July 22, 2025.
- After the release of "Doggy", "Geezer" was updated to credit Abstract and Fike as Geezer.

== Personnel ==
Credits are adapted from Tidal and Abstract's official website.

=== Musicians ===
- Kevin Abstract – vocals (tracks 2, 3, 5–11, 15–17, 19), production (tracks 1, 3, 4, 5, 7, 8, 11, 12, 14–17), executive production
- Quadeca – vocals (tracks 18, 19), production (tracks 6, 12, 14, 18, 19), executive production
- Devan Manley – vocals (track 14), production (tracks 2, 3, 5, 7–9, 11, 14, 16, 17), synthesizer (track 8), guitar (track 9), co-executive production
- AJ – production (tracks 5, 8, 11, 14–17), co-executive production
- Love Spells – vocals (tracks 2, 3, 5–8, 14–17)
- Ameer Vann – vocals (tracks 2, 6, 14, 17, 19)
- E Bleu – vocals (tracks 3, 14, 16, 17)
- Drigo – vocals (tracks 6, 14, 16)
- Truly Young – vocals (tracks 6, 15, 16)
- Dominic Fike – vocals (tracks 10, 13, 15), production (track 10), guitar (track 10)
- SoGone SoFlexy – vocals (tracks 2, 3)
- Makana XO – vocals (tracks 2, 5)
- Diego – vocals (tracks 6, 7)
- roro – vocals (track 1)
- Danny Brown – vocals (track 4)
- JPEGMafia – vocals (track 6)
- Sekou – vocals (track 9)
- Derby – vocals (track 11), production (track 11)
- Saint – vocals (track 15), background vocals (track 14)
- Kiko Merley – production (tracks 2, 4, 5, 14, 17)
- Fahem Efram – production (tracks 3, 7, 8, 15)
- Devin Workman – production (tracks 10, 13, 15), drums (track 10), programming (track 10), vocal arrangement (track 10)
- 40hrz – production (tracks 14, 16, 17)
- Sheldon Wells – production (tracks 5, 8)
- Romil Hemnani – production (tracks 7, 9), synthesizer (track 9)
- Wizzle – production (tracks 14, 17)
- TEYKO – production (track 1), keyboards (track 1)
- Roy Blair – production (track 3)
- Olivia Lattore – production (track 2)
- Plantcham – production (track 2)
- Jordon – production (track 4)
- Jared – production (track 5)
- Rob Bisel – production (track 7)
- Splitted Stupid – production (track 8)
- Henry Kwapis – production (track 10), bass guitar (track 10)
- Jim-E Stack – production (track 10), synthesizer (track 10)
- Ryan Raines – production (track 10), drums (track 10)
- Daniel Aged – production (track 13)
- Elie – production (track 14)
- Joshy – production (track 14)
- Ross – production (track 14)
- Jonnywood – production (track 15)
- Macshooter – production (track 15)
- Noah – violin (track 1)
- Matt – synthesizer (track 8)

=== Technical ===
- Jason Lader – mixing (tracks 4, 5, 7–10, 13–17)
- Quadeca – mixing (tracks 6, 18, 19), engineering (tracks 6, 12, 18, 19)
- Kevin Abstract – mixing (track 2, 3), recording engineering (track 12)
- Derby – mixing (track 11), recording engineering (track 11)
- Devin Workman – mixing (track 13, 15)
- Vlado Meller – mastering
- 40hrz – engineering (tracks 2, 3, 5, 8, 15–17)
- Z – engineering (tracks 6, 16)
- Romil Hemnani – engineering (tracks 7, 9)
- TEYKO – engineering (track 1)
- Raphy – engineering (track 4)
- Devan Manley – engineering (track 12)
- Haze Howard – engineering (track 14)
