= Life 1 =

Studio album by Quadeca
- Released: October 1, 2026
- Length: 48:22
- Label: X8
- Producer: Quadeca

Quadeca chronology
Vanisher, Horizon Scraper (2025)	Life 1 (2026)

Singles from Life 1
- 1. "Dark Magic" Released: May 27, 2026; 2. "Baby Steps" Released: June 23, 2026; 3. "Hell of a Time" Released: July 22, 2026; 4. "Life 1 (Where Did the Time Go)" Released: September 21, 2026

Life 1 is the fifth studio album by the American musician Quadeca, released on October 1, 2026, via his own record label, X8 Music. It serves as the follow-up to Vanisher, Horizon Scraper (2025). In promotion of Life 1, Quadeca released four singles – "Dark Magic", "Baby Steps", "Hell of a Time," "Life 1 (Where Did the Time Go)" – and announced a North American tour, which is set to take place in October and November 2026. The album features an appearance from Canadian musician Kmoe.

== Background ==
On July 25, 2025, Quadeca released his studio album Vanisher, Horizon Scraper to critical acclaim, and served as his first released through his own label, X8 Music, after leaving DeadAir Records. A concept album based on a sailor who goes on a voyage, a film that serves as a visual compliment to the album was also released. Quadeca went on a North American tour in support of the album in October and November.

On March 18, 2026, Quadeca posted on his Instagram page with the caption "new album i think i will call it life1." This post has since been deleted. Shortly after, Quadeca toured in Australia, with merch pertaining to Life 1 being sold. On May 16, Quadeca debuted "Like You Always Do" live at the Kilby Block Party, because he wrote the song in Pine Valley, Utah.

== Music and lyrics ==
=== Tracks ===
The opening track, "Life 1 (Where Did the Time Go)", combines elements of jazz, synths, and "flamenco-style" guitar, with vocal harmonies similar to a Justin Timberlake track. The second track, "Dark Magic" begins with "distorted breathing and abrasive guitar drones" before evolving into the use of "warm" electric piano chords, built around "tonal whiplash and absurdist tension." The tenth track, "Baby Steps" is a fusion of hip-hop, indie rock, and folk music, with Quadeca singing on an acoustic track. The eleventh track, "Hell of a time," is primarily a dance track, centering around the use of artificial sounding drum presets, and ending with an orchestral swell.

== Promotion and release ==
On May 27, 2026, Quadeca released the album's lead single "Dark Magic" with an accompanied music video, with direction and editing from Quadeca and Brendon Burton. The music video first uses "surreal humour and unsettling imagery" before transforming into a "strange rural road movie, with Quadeca travelling through South Carolina in a wooden house mounted to a pickup truck." On June 23, he released its second single "Baby Steps" with an accompanied music video.

On July 22, Quadeca released the album's third single "Hell of a Time" with an accompanied music video. The same day of its release, he announced a North American tour of the album. On July 25 and August 1, Quadeca performed at the Fuji Rock and Lollapalooza festivals, respectively. The 22-date North American tour in support of Life 1 is set to begin on October 10, in Mesa and conclude on November 10, in Los Angeles.

On September 21, Quadeca released the album's fourth single "Life 1 (Where Did the Time Go)" with an accompanied music video on Youtube. The end of the music video revealed the album's release date as October 1, 2026, which was further confirmed through social media. It was released by X8 Music.

== Reception ==
Professional ratings
Review scores
Source	Rating
Earmilk	9/10
The Needle Drop	6/10
Still Listening	9/10

Life 1 was well received by listeners and critics alike. Eliot Odgers for Still Listening noted the album's range in emotions and influences between acts such as Brockhampton and recent works from Black Country, New Road. Odgers also likened the record's sequencing to the passage of one's life, highlighting the excitement initially presented, eventually contrasted by gradually darker moments. Similar sentiments of Life 1 embodying the general life experience were also recognized by Deaundre Dixon, writing for Earmilk, who saw Quadeca's writing and production choices throughout as representations of many different lives, with Lasky "metaphorically pushing through the noise" by the end.

Anthony Fantano, while recognizing the album's variety and comparing it to Quadeca's Scrapyard mixtape from 2024, still felt mixed about the record and didn't believe it showcased Ben's strongest songwriting, considering it more of an in-between project where the music was approached in a "sandbox mode" manner.

== Track listing ==
All tracks are written by Quadeca, except "Celery" (written with Fahem Erfan).

Life 1 track listing
No.	Title	Length
1.	"Life 1 (Where Did the Time Go)"	3:07
2.	"Dark Magic"	2:55
3.	"The Hero Never Dies"	3:20
4.	"It Goes Like This"	3:41
5.	"Celery"	0:37
6.	"Make You My What" (with Kmoe)	2:48
7.	"Regular Guy"	4:12
8.	"The Gambler"	1:31
9.	"Like You Always Do"	4:23
10.	"Baby Steps"	3:58
11.	"Hell of a Time"	3:43
12.	"Illusion of Choice"	5:33
13.	"Good Grief"	4:09
14.	"In Another Life..."	4:25
Total length:		48:22

=== Note ===
- All track titles are stylized in sentence case, with the exception of "Celery" and "The Gambler", which are stylized in all caps. Tracks 2 and 10 were originally released in title case.

== Personnel ==
Credits are adapted from Tidal.

- Quadeca – production, mixing, mastering (all tracks); vocals (tracks 1, 3, 4, 6–14), piano (1, 3, 7, 12), percussion (1, 4, 7–10, 12, 13), synthesizer (1, 10, 13), programming (1), electric piano (2, 9), drums (2), guitar (2, 4, 7–9, 12, 13), keyboards (4, 13)
- Johnny Hall – keyboards (1), piano (2)
- Fahem Erfan – guitar (1, 4, 6, 7, 9), vocals (5), bass (10, 13)
- Myles Martin – drums (1, 8–10, 13)
- Johan Lenox – piano (3, 14)
- Caleb Buchanan – bass (6), upright bass (9, 12)
- Kmoe – production, vocals (6)
- Oleka – vocals (9)
- Noah Ehler – cello (12), production (14)

== Charts ==
Chart performance for Life 1
Chart (2026)	Peak position
US & Canadian College Radio Top 200 (NACC)	28
