= Blanket (album) =

Studio album by Kevin Abstract
- Released: November 3, 2023
- Length: 37:37
- Label: RCA; Video Store
- Producer: Jonah Abraham; Julian Ali; Carlton; Romil Hemnani; Tyler Johnson; Kid Harpoon; John Carroll Kirby; Rewined

Kevin Abstract chronology
Arizona Baby (2019)	Blanket (2023)	Blush (2025)

Singles from Blanket
- 1. "Blanket" Released: October 4, 2023; 2. "What Should I Do?" Released: October 18, 2023; 3. "Running Out" Released: October 25, 2023; 4. "Madonna" Released: November 1, 2023

Blanket is the fourth studio album by American rapper Kevin Abstract, released on November 3, 2023, through RCA Records and Video Store. It is his first album after the breakup of Brockhampton the previous year. Abstract's former Brockhampton bandmate Romil Hemnani produced the album with multi-instrumentalist Jonah Abraham. The title track was released as the lead single with an accompanying "dystopian" video co-directed by Abstract and featuring him interacting with three characters in costumes. This was followed by three additional singles leading up to the release of the album: "What Should I Do?", "Running Out" and "Madonna" released on October 18, October 25 and November 1, 2023, respectively. This is also Abstract's final album to be released under RCA.

== Background and recording ==
Blanket follows the dual release of Brockhampton's The Family and TM a year prior, the former of which was essentially a Kevin Abstract solo album with production contributions from other members of the band. Kevin Abstract worked on the album with Brockhampton member Romil Hemnani serving as producer over three months, explaining that he wanted "to make, like, a Sunny Day Real Estate, Nirvana, Modest Mouse type of record" that "hit like a rap album".

== Critical reception ==
Professional ratings
Aggregate scores
Source	Rating
Metacritic	65/100
Review scores
Source	Rating
Clash	8/10
DIY	2.5/5 stars
The Line of Best Fit	4/10
NME	3/5 stars
Pitchfork	6.7/10

Blanket received a score of 65 out of 100 on review aggregator Metacritic based on four critics' reviews, indicating "generally favorable" reception. Clash's James Mellen felt that "what makes Blanket thrive and pulse is its completely commitment to unrelenting honesty and vulnerability from Abstract. He runs through the record naked, speaking odes on his identity, atop of some gloriously fuzzy riffs, synthesisers and drums". Thomas Smith of NME stated that the album "picks up where Arizona Baby left off, but burrows deeper into those indie-rock influences" but "in totality, however, the collection is more of a mood piece than of noticeable, memorable songs". Evan Rytlewski of Pitchfork found the album to have a "grungy, guitar-centric" sound that "isn't always a natural fit", but still remarked that Abstract has "an ear for sticky, misshapen melodies and a rap producer's sense of pacing, which keeps Blanket moving so briskly that its periodic clumsiness doesn't bog it down much".

David Smyth of the Evening Standard wrote that "the idea of Blanket hitting like a rap album is a tougher sell. [...] It's not the kind of album that will launch him to solo superstardom, but it doesn't sound like that would appeal to him anyway". Noah Barker of The Line of Best Fit called the album "the mark of a restless artist unable to afford the time to care like he used to" and "attempting a moment of multitude and homogenizing the results into auditory mush".

== Track listing ==
Blanket track listing
No.	Title	Writer(s)	Producer(s)	Length
1.	"When the Rope Post 2 Break"	Ian Simpson; Jonah Abraham; Romil Hemnani; John Carroll Kirby; Joshuah Melnick; Julian Rapaport	Hemnani; Kirby	3:26
2.	"Blanket"	Simpson; Abraham; Hemnani; Pilot Lee; Rapaport	Abraham; Julian Ali; Romil Hemnani	1:57
3.	"Running Out"	Simpson; Abraham; Hemnani; Kirby; Carlton McDowell; Melnick; Lee; Rapaport; Reece Weinberg	Abraham; Carlton; Hemnani; Kirby; Rewined	3:32
4.	"The Greys"	Simpson; Abraham; Baird Acheson; Hemnani; Kirby; Roy Mabie; Rapaport	Abraham; Hemnani	4:39
5.	"Voyager"	Simpson; Abraham; Hemnani; Melnick; Rapaport	Abraham; Hemnani	3:05
6.	"Madonna"	Simpson; Sarah Aarons; Kid Harpoon; Hemnani; Tyler Johnson; Melnick	Hemnani; Johnson; Kid Harpoon	3:03
7.	"Today I Gave Up"	Simpson; Abraham; Sachi DiSerafino; Hemnani; Lee; Melnick	Abraham; Hemnani	2:26
8.	"What Should I Do?"	Simpson; Abraham; Jamison Baken; Cole Bat; Jack Bat; Itamar Fainer; Hemnani; Rapaport	Abraham; Hemnani	3:03
9.	"Mr. Edwards"	Simpson; Abraham; Hemnani; Lee	Abraham; Hemnani	0:52
10.	"Scream"	Simpson; Abraham; Acheson; Hemnani; Melnick; Rapaport	Abraham; Ali; Hemnani	2:39
11.	"Real 2 Me"	Simpson; Abraham; Hemnani; Melnick	Abraham; Hemnani	3:18
12.	"Heights, Spiders, and the Dark"	Simpson; Abraham; Baken; Hemnani; Melnick	Abraham; Hemnani	2:07
13.	"My Friend"	Simpson; Abraham; Baken; J. Bat; Hemnani; Kara Jackson; MJ Lenderman; Melnick	Abraham; Hemnani	3:30
Total length:				37:37

== Personnel ==
Musicians

- Kevin Abstract – vocals
- Julian Ali – piano (tracks 1, 5, 8), synthesizer (3)
- Sylvie Grace – strings (1, 5), cello (7)
- Samuel Acchione – guitar (1)
- Jonah Abraham – programming (1)
- Jamison Baken – strings (2, 8, 12, 13)
- Pilot Lee – vocals (2)
- Roy Blair – background vocals (4)
- Baird – guitar (4)
- John Carroll Kirby – synthesizer (4)
- Q – vocals (5)
- Kid Harpoon – acoustic guitar, drums, electric guitar, programming (6)
- Tyler Johnson – background vocals, keyboards (6)
- Ryan Nasci – bass (6)
- Romil Hemnani – programming (6)
- Sachi DiSerafino – acoustic guitar (7)
- Amaka – background vocals (8)
- Presley Regier – background vocals (8)
- Itamar Fainer – electric guitar (8)
- MJ Lenderman – guitar, vocals (13)
- Kara Jackson – vocals (13)

Technical

- Mike Bozzi – mastering
- Neal H Pogue – mixing
- Kaushlesh Purohit – engineering (1–5, 7–13)
- Romil Hemnani – engineering (1–5, 7–13)
- Gregg White – engineering (1)
- Owen Stoutt – engineering (6)
- Brian Rajaratnam – engineering (6)
- Gehring Miller – engineering (6)
- G – vocal engineering (6)
- Zachary Acosta – engineering assistance
- Emi Trevena – engineering assistance (6)
