= Quadeca =

American musician, producer, and YouTuber (born 2000)

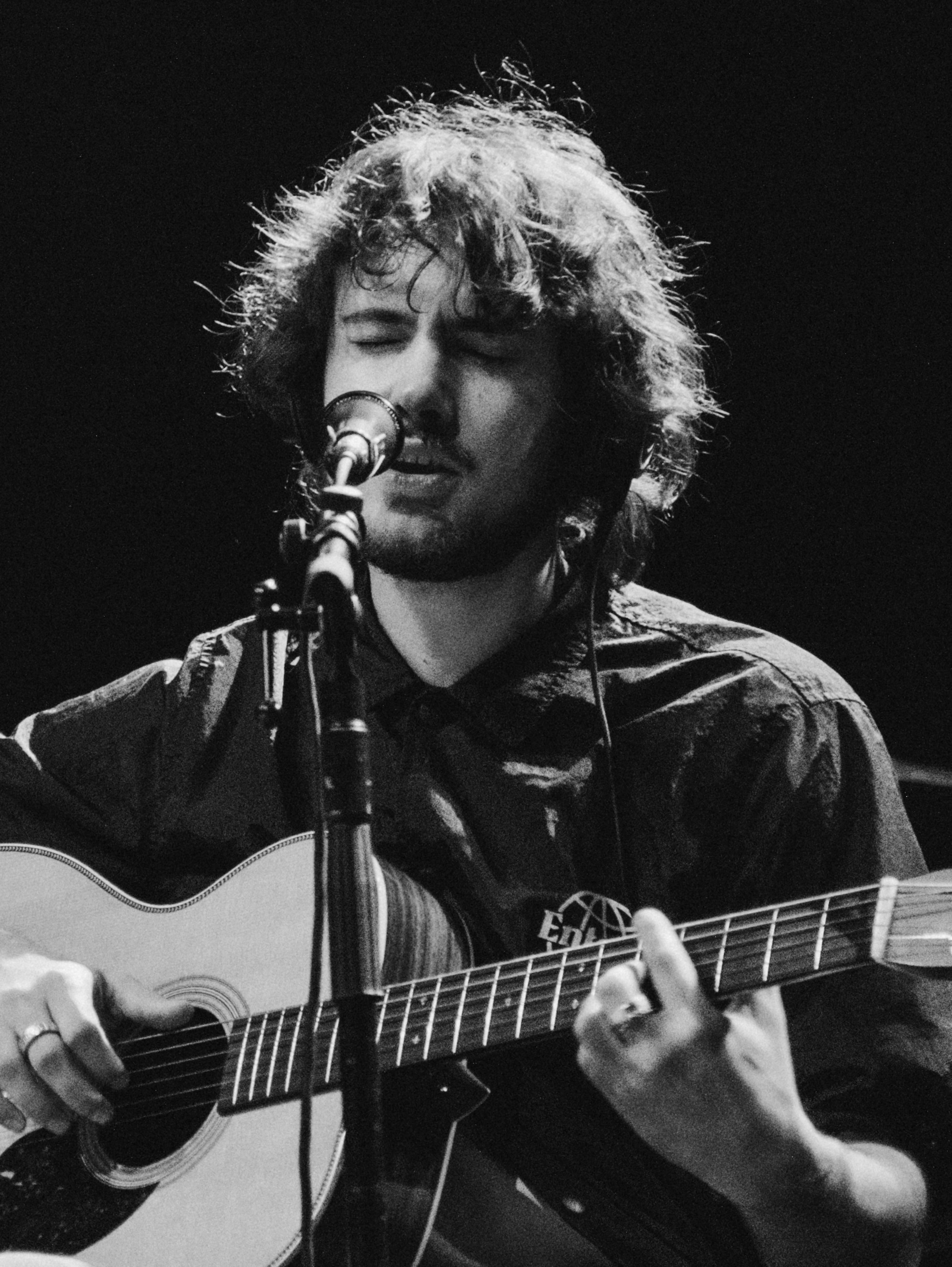
- Quadeca performing in 2024

Background information
- Born: Benjamin Fernando Barajas Lasky; October 2, 2000 (age 26); Los Angeles, California, U.S.
- Genres: Alternative pop; indie rock; neo-psychedelia; electronic
- Occupations: Singer-songwriter; record producer; YouTuber; rapper
- Years active: 2015–present
- Labels: X8 Music; AWAL; DeadAir

YouTube information
- Channel: Quadeca
- Years active: 2012–present
- Genres: Music; video games
- Subscribers: 1.92 million
- Views: 248.6 million
- Last updated: November 4, 2025
- Parents: Mitch Lasky (father); Cecilia Barajas (mother)

Benjamin Fernando Barajas Lasky (born October 2, 2000), better known by his stage name Quadeca, is an American singer-songwriter, record producer and rapper. Lasky began uploading songs and videos to his YouTube channel in the 2010s and began pursuing his musical career in the 2020s, which has since been met with critical acclaim.

Lasky deviated away from his YouTube career as QuadecaX8 to focus on his music career, releasing four mixtapes prior to the albums Voice Memos in 2019, From Me to You in 2021 and I Didn't Mean to Haunt You in 2022. The mixtape Scrapyard, released on February 16, 2024, contains features from Brakence and Kevin Abstract. His fourth studio album, Vanisher, Horizon Scraper, was released in July 2025, and contains features from Danny Brown, Maruja and Olēka. His fifth studio album, Life 1, released on October 1, 2026 and features Kmoe.

== Early life ==
Benjamin Fernando Barajas Lasky was born on October 2, 2000, in Los Angeles, California. His father, Mitch Lasky, is a general partner for Benchmark, and a former entrepreneur and video game executive. Lasky became an avid soccer player as a child and was enthusiastic about hip-hop and other forms of music, spending his free time writing songs on guitar and piano. His younger sister Anna featured in some of his earliest videos; he also has an older sister, Natasha.

Lasky opened his YouTube channel on June 11, 2012, under the name QuadecaX8; his early videos were based around video game commentating and the FIFA franchise. In 2014, Lasky began to create rap-related content and freestyles for his YouTube channel. In February, he performed at a middle school talent show that went viral on YouTube. He was admitted to Menlo School in 2015, where he joined the soccer team. Lasky continued to play with his soccer team through his student years and became a tri-captain of the team.

== Career ==
=== 2018–2021: Voice Memos and From Me to You ===
In late 2018, YouTuber KSI called out Lasky and other YouTube rappers, referring to them as "frauds". Lasky responded with a diss track, titled "Insecure", within a week. The music video received over 8 million views within 10 days. In November, KSI gave a review of the track and praised it, saying that it warranted a diss track from himself. He responded to Lasky's song with his own diss track "Ares", to which Lasky gave a lukewarm response in a tweet. Logan Paul revealed that he had wanted to collaborate with Lasky to diss KSI as well, but was denied.

On March 8, 2019, he released his debut studio album Voice Memos, and on March 22, the album peaked at No. 42 on Billboard's Independent Albums and Heatseekers Albums. He was featured on the song "Roll the Dice" from KSI and Randolph's collaborative album New Age on April 12, 2019, and continued releasing singles for the rest of the year, including the songs "Not a Diss Track", "Schoenberg", and "I Don't Care".

After an extended hiatus, on January 29, 2021, Lasky reannounced his second studio album titled From Me to You on YouTube, which released on March 30, 2021, under AWAL. He released the self-produced single "Sisyphus" on March 20, 2021, which garnered widespread critical praise.

=== 2022–present: I Didn't Mean to Haunt You, Scrapyard, Vanisher, Horizon Scraper and Life 1 ===
On September 19, 2022, Lasky released the lead single to his third album I Didn't Mean to Haunt You, titled "Born Yesterday". He then released the album's second single, titled "Tell Me a Joke", on October 25, 2022. On the same day, he announced his album, revealing the cover art, tracklist, and release date. The album, a self-produced concept album where Lasky plays the role of a ghost reckoning with his own suicide as his loved ones move on without him, released on November 11, 2022 and features experimental rapper Danny Brown and the Sunday Service Choir. The album was released alongside an accompanying film later that same day. I Didn't Mean To Haunt You marked a notable stylistic shift in Quadeca's artistry that was celebrated by critics, such as Spill Magazine, who rated the album 4 out of 5 stars, and Anthony Fantano, who ranked the album's lead single "Born Yesterday" as the seventh-best song of 2022.

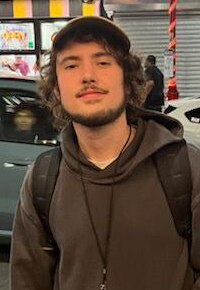
Quadeca in 2024

On October 3, 2023, Lasky announced via his Twitter and Instagram pages an upcoming project, "The Scrapyard Series". Lasky detailed that the project would consist of five separate EPs, consisting of 2–3 songs that did not make the cut for I Didn't Mean to Haunt You, or his then-upcoming album Vanisher, Horizon Scraper, each one being released every 2–3 weeks. The first EP was released on October 11, 2023, titled Scrapyard I. The second EP, Scrapyard II, was released October 30, 2023, and the third EP, Scrapyard III, was released on November 22, 2023. On December 24, 2023, Lasky announced that the remainder of the Scrapyard EPs would not be released, but promised that the series would "go out with a bang". On February 15, 2024, Lasky published a music video for his song "Way Too Many Friends" as promotional material for the final installment of the series, a mixtape titled Scrapyard. The mixtape, which compiled all of the songs on the EPs as well as songs previously unreleased, released on February 23, 2024. Scrapyard built upon Quadeca's newfound critical success in online music spaces with Anthony Fantano giving the project a score of 9 out of 10, ranking it as the 12th best album of 2024. KTLA also listed Scrapyard as the seventh best album of 2024.

Quadeca's fourth album, Vanisher, Horizon Scraper, was released on July 25, 2025. It was accompanied by a full-length film posted to YouTube which was written and directed by Lasky, featuring the entire concept album in visual form. Lasky's Vanisher, Horizon Scraper Tour was from September 30, 2025 to December 15, 2025 in the U.S., Ireland, Germany, the Netherlands, and the UK.

Quadeca announced his Australia tour on November 23, 2025. Frontier Touring and Penny Drop made the official public reveal that day through social media posts on Instagram, Facebook, and TikTok. The Australia tour for Vanisher, Horizon Scraper ran from May 2, 2026 to May 5, 2026.

On March 18, 2026, Quadeca revealed the title of his fifth album Life 1 in a now-deleted Instagram post with the caption "new album I think I will name it life1." Over the next few months, Lasky performed at several festivals and announced a North American tour to accompany the then-upcoming record, with European dates later added due to popular demand.

Quadeca released Life 1 on October 1, 2026 to continued praise from listeners who cited the album's stripped back compositions as "more natural and less laboured than on Vanisher, Horizon Scraper."

== Artistry ==
=== Style and influences ===
Lasky's early releases were categorized as "YouTube rap", influenced by rappers like J Cole. In his second album From Me To You, Quadeca drew from influences such as Tyler, the Creator, Joji, Childish Gambino and Frank Ocean.

With I Didn't Mean to Haunt You, Scrapyard and Vanisher, Horizon Scraper, Quadeca has since cited artists such as Duster, the Microphones, Lingua Ignota, Björk, and Caroline Polachek as influences. As a part of Pitchfork's "Perfect 10" social media series, Lasky described how the album Construção by Brazilian musician Chico Buarque influenced his 2025 album, Vanisher, Horizon Scraper. The opening track from Buarque's album, "Deus Lhe Pague", was sampled on Vanisher, Horizon Scraper's opening track, "NO QUESTIONS ASKED".

== Discography ==
=== Studio albums ===
Title	Album details	Peak chart positions	
Title	Album details	US Ind.	US Heat
Voice Memos	Released: March 8, 2019; Label: Self-released	42	15
From Me to You	Released: March 30, 2021; Label: AWAL	—	—
I Didn't Mean to Haunt You	Released: November 10, 2022; Label: DeadAir, AWAL	—	—
Vanisher, Horizon Scraper	Released: July 25, 2025; Label: X8 Music	39	—
Life 1	Released: October 1, 2026; Label: X8 Music	—	—

=== Mixtapes ===
Title	Album details
Work in Progress	Released: September 16, 2015; Label: Self-released
Nostalgia for the Now	Released: May 10, 2016; Label: Self-released
Bad Internet Rapper	Released: January 31, 2017; Label: Self-released
Out of Order	Released: November 10, 2017; Label: Self-released
Scrapyard	Released: February 16, 2024; Label: DeadAir

Collaborative albums
Title	Album details
1Day (with Saint G)	Released: October 7, 2018; Label: Self-released

=== EPs ===
Title	EP details
Scrapyard I	Released: October 11, 2023; Label: DeadAir
Scrapyard II	Released: October 30, 2023; Label: DeadAir
Scrapyard III	Released: November 22, 2023; Label: DeadAir
i.ii.iii	Released: February 2, 2026; Label: X8 Music (self-released)

=== Singles ===
Title	Year	Album
"Wii Music Fire"	2015	Work in Progress
"Mind's Eye"	2016	Nostalgia for the Now
"You Can't Rap"	2016	Nostalgia for the Now
"Dreamlife" (featuring Gracie Zander)	2016	Non-album single
"2020"	2016	Bad Internet Rapper
"Unscripted"	2016	Bad Internet Rapper
"Lemon Tree"	2017	Bad Internet Rapper
"Cause He Has One"	2017	Non-album single
"Who Would've Thought"	2017	Out of Order
"Idontwannaspeakagain"	2017	Out of Order
"Hold Up" (featuring Quentin Miller)	2017	Out of Order
"Clouted Up"	2018	Non-album single
"Heart Attack"	2018	Non-album single
"No Deal" (featuring Moxas)	2018	Non-album single
"Unusual" (featuring B. Lou)	2018	Voice Memos
"Insecure"	2018	Non-album single
"Four Horsemen" (with Crypt, Dax, and Scru Face Jean)	2019	Non-album single
"War!" (featuring Dax)	2019	Voice Memos
"Uh-Huh"	2019	Voice Memos
"Not a Diss Track"	2019	Non-album single
"Volt" (with Sad Frosty)	2019	Non-album single
"Gordon Ramsay" (featuring Sad Frosty)	2019	Non-album single
"The Man on my Left Shoulder"	2019	Voice Memos
"Tomfoolery" (with Egovert, Kil, and Moxas)	2019	Non-album single
"I Don't Care"	2019	Non-album single
"Schoenberg" (featuring Moxas)	2019	Non-album single
"Fish Outta Bacardi" (featuring Egovert)	2019	Non-album single
"Beamin'"	2019	Non-album single
"Class in Session!" (with A1TH)	2020	Ignorant as Hell
"Where'd You Go?"	2020	From Me to You
"Alone Together"	2020	From Me to You
"Live Like This"	2020	Non-album single
"Sisyphus"	2021	From Me to You
"Rip Bozo" (featuring Lou from Paradise)	2021	Non-album single
"born yesterday"	2022	I Didn't Mean to Haunt You
"tell me a joke"	2022	I Didn't Mean to Haunt You
"GODSTAINED"	2025	Vanisher, Horizon Scraper
"MONDAY"	2025	Vanisher, Horizon Scraper
"FORGONE"	2025	Vanisher, Horizon Scraper
"Dark Magic"	2026	Life 1
"Baby Steps"	2026	Life 1
"Hell of a time"	2026	Life 1
"Life 1 (where did the time go)"	2026	Life 1

=== Guest appearances ===
Title	Year	Album
"Batter Up" (Didac featuring Quadeca)	2018	Non-album singles
"Lost in the Clouds" (CamDaye featuring FiveAm and Quadeca)	2018	Non-album singles
"Supreme" (Reactitup featuring Quadeca)	2018	Non-album singles
"Illy Mode" (Scru Face Jean featuring Quadeca)	2019	Non-album singles
"Roll the Dice" (Randolph featuring Quadeca)	2019	New Age
"Tonight's the Night" (Walia featuring Quadeca)	2019	Non-album single
"Emergency" (B. Lou featuring Dax and Quadeca)	2019	BOW
"Duh Nuh" (Crypt featuring Quadeca)	2019	Tales from the Crypt
"Outbreak" (Josh A featuring Quadeca)	2019	Disgrace
"Bigger" (Joey Nato featuring Quadeca)	2019	Who Made This Album?
"Solid" (JAG featuring Quadeca)	2020	Non-album single
"Darken The Shadow" (Pellek featuring Quadeca)	2021	Darken the Shadow OST
"Tunnel of Glass" (Asian Glow featuring Quadeca)	2024	Unwired Detour
"NOLA" (Kevin Abstract featuring Truly Young, Love Spells, Diego, Drigo, JPEGMafia, and Quadeca)	2025	Blush
"Abandon Me" (Kevin Abstract featuring Quadeca)	2025	Blush
"Red Light" (Kevin Abstract featuring Quadeca and Ameer Vann)	2025	Blush
"Book of Daniel" (Danny Brown featuring Quadeca)	2025	Stardust
"What You See" (Danny Brown featuring Quadeca)	2025	Stardust
