= American Boyfriend: A Suburban Love Story =

Studio album by Kevin Abstract
- Released: November 18, 2016
- Studios: Various: Jeff's Studio, South Pasadena, CA; Amberwood Studios, South Pasadena, CA; White Lines, Los Angeles, CA; Red Bull Studios, Los Angeles, CA; BROCKHAMPTON Factory, San Marcos, TX; Brockhampton Factory, Los Angeles, CA
- Genres: Indie pop; alternative hip-hop; alternative R&B
- Length: 37:39
- Label: Brockhampton Records
- Producers: Michael Uzowuru (also exec.); Kevin Abstract; Bearface; Russell "Joba" Boring; Albert Gordon; Robert Hale; Romil Hemnani; Om'Mas Keith; Jeff Kleinman; Roy Blair Ricky Reed

Kevin Abstract chronology
MTV1987 (2014)	American Boyfriend: A Suburban Love Story (2016)	Arizona Baby (2019)

CD cover

Singles from American Boyfriend: A Suburban Love Story
- 1. "Echo" Released: November 30, 2015; 2. "Empty" Released: September 20, 2016; 3. "Yellow" Released: November 2, 2016; 4. "Miserable America" Released: November 3, 2016

American Boyfriend: A Suburban Love Story is the second studio album by American recording artist Kevin Abstract, released on November 18, 2016.

== Background ==
On January 15, 2015, Kevin Abstract informed fans via his Twitter page that his record was to be titled Death of a Supermodel and that it would be released later in the year. This album was then later discarded, however. Abstract then announced that he was working on a different album, They Shoot Horses, a part of the Death of a Supermodel trilogy. In November, the first single from They Shoot Horses, "Echo" was released, along with a music video directed by Tyler Mitchell.

At the end of June 2016, Kevin announced that he had changed the title of his upcoming album to American Boyfriend: A Suburban Love Story and that it would still be coming later in the year.

The album's second single "Empty" was released on September 20, 2016, alongside a self-directed music video.

The album's release date was confirmed as November 18 on October 24. The album's artwork, designed by Tyler Mitchell and Henock "HK" Sileshi, and track listing were released on October 31.

The album's third single, "Yellow" was premiered by Zane Lowe on Beats One on November 2, followed by "Miserable America", premiered by Shane Powers on Dash Radio the next day.

== Reception ==
American Boyfriend: A Suburban Love Story received generally positive reviews upon release. Ryan Bassil of Noisey said, "it's one of the most nuanced and touching documentations of the gloriously testing period that forms the experience of growing up and becoming yourself." David Turner of Pitchfork said, "American Boyfriend can feel a bit scattered and unsure, but it’s an album seeking love in a world now primed to find new angles for hate. For that reason alone, it feels welcome."

== Track listing ==
No.	Title	Writer(s)	Producer(s)	Length
1.	"Empty"	Kevin Abstract; Michael Uzowuru; Russell "Joba" Boring; Roy Blair	Uzowuru; Jeff Kleinman; Romil Hemnani^{[b]}	3:14
2.	"Seventeen"	Abstract; Uzowuru	Hemnani; Kleinman^{[a]}; Uzoworu^{[a]}; Abstract^{[a]}	2:45
3.	"Blink"	Abstract	Blair; Abstract; Kleinman^{[b]}; Uzowuru^{[b]}	2:55
4.	"Friendship"	Abstract	Hemnani; Abstract	0:23
5.	"Tattoo"	Abstract; William Wood; Uzowuru; Boring	Uzowuru; Kleinman; Om'Mas Keith; Hemnani^{[a]}	3:27
6.	"Yellow"	Abstract; Uzowuru; Boring	Uzowuru; Kleinman; Keith	3:31
7.	"Suburbian Born"	Abstract	Robert Hale; Abstract; Joba	1:09
8.	"Kin"	Abstract	Kleinman; Abstract	0:29 / 3:26
9.	"Runner"	Abstract; Blair	Uzowuru; Kleinman; Hemnani^{[b]}; Blair^{[b]}; Abstract^{[b]}	2:57
10.	"Flintridge"	Abstract	Abstract; Blair; Hemnani	0:37
11.	"Papercut"	Abstract	Hemnani; Uzowuru; Kleinman^{[b]}	3:27
12.	"June 29"	Uzowuru	Kleinman	0:48
13.	"Miserable America"	Abstract; Uzowuru	Uzowuru; Kleinman; Ricky Reed	2:45
14.	"American Boyfriend"	Abstract; Ciarán McDonald; Uzowuru	Bearface; Reed	3:58
15.	"Echo"	Abstract; Wood	Hemnani; Albert Gordon; Kleinman^{[b]}; Uzowuru^{[b]}	2:36
16.	"I Do (End Credits)"	Abstract; Jeff Gitty	Hemnani; Abstract; Uzowuru^{[b]}; Kleinman^{[b]}; Joba^{[b]}	2:38
Total length:				37:39

Notes

- ^{^[a]} signifies a co-producer
- ^{^[b]} signifies an additional producer
- On the physical version of the album, "Kin" is 3:26 long.
- "Seventeen" features additional vocals by Ivana Nwokike and Sunday Osunwa.
- "Tattoo" features additional vocals by Sunday Osunwa.
- "Yellow" features additional vocals by Ivana Nwokike, Sunday Osunwa, Teo Halm and Roy Blair.
- "Runner" features vocals by Roy Blair.
- "Papercut" features additional vocals by Ivana Nwokike and Roy Blair.
- "June 29th" features vocals by Sunday Osunwa.
- "Miserable America" features additional vocals by Russell "Joba" Boring.
- "Echo" features additional vocals by Roy Blair.

== Personnel ==
- Kevin Abstract – lead artist, creative direction, writer (tracks 1–11, 13–16), production (tracks 3, 4, 7, 8, 10, 16), co-production (track 2), additional production (track 9), engineering (track 9)
- Bearface – writer (track 14), production (track 14), engineering (track 14)
- Ramsay Bell – photographer
- Bradley Bledsoe – publicity
- Russell "Joba" Boring – writer (tracks 1, 5, 6), production (track 7), trumpet (track 11), additional programming (track 13), additional vocals (track 13), engineering (tracks 1, 5, 7, 11, 13), mix (tracks 3, 4, 7, 16)
- Austin Brown – photographer
- Captain Noah – additional guitars (track 5, 6)
- Chris Clancy – management
- Kelly Clancy – management
- Jordan Cole – children's choir (track 1)
- Izzy Commers – photographer
- Daedelus – additional synths (track 6)
- Nick Dierl – publicity
- Jeff Gitty – writer (track 16), additional guitars (track 6), vocoder (track 16)
- Albert Gordon – production (track 15)
- Ashlan Grey – photographer
- Robert Hale – production (track 7)
- Teo Halm – assistant production (tracks 5, 6), additional vocals (track 6)
- Romil Hemnani – production (tracks 2, 4, 10, 11, 15, 16), co-production (track 5), additional production (tracks 1, 9), additional drum programming (tracks 9, 13), engineering (tracks 2, 4, 5, 9–11, 13, 15, 16)
- Carmen Jackson – choir (tracks 5, 13)
- Jordan Jackson – choir (tracks 5, 13)
- Jordan Jones – engineering (track 6)
- Om'Mas Keith – production (tracks 5, 6), vocal production (track 6), choir arrangement (track 5), engineering (track 6)
- Brandon Thoreau Kelly – engineering (track 6)
- Jeff Kleinman – mastering, production (1, 5, 6, 8, 9, 12, 13), co-production (track 2), additional production (tracks 3, 11, 15, 16), additional guitars (track 14), engineering (tracks 1, 2, 5, 8, 9, 11, 13, 14, 16), mix (tracks 1, 2, 5, 6, 8–12)
- Jack Loken – guitar (track 10), additional guitar (track 9)
- Roy Mabie – writer (tracks 1, 9), production (tracks 3, 10), additional production (track 9), drum programming (track 6), vocals (track 9), additional vocals (tracks 6, 11, 15), engineering (3, 6, 10, 15)
- Craig Marshall – legal counsel
- Tyler Mitchell – photographer
- Jon Nunes – management
- Ivana Nwokike – additional vocals (tracks 2, 6, 11)
- Anish Ochani – management
- Robert Ontenient – web development
- Sunday Osunwa – vocals (track 12) additional vocals (tracks 2, 5, 6)
- Ricky Reed – production (tracks 13, 14), additional guitars (track 14), engineering (tracks 13, 14), mix (tracks 13, 14)
- Michael Rosen – harmonica (track 5)
- Henock Sileshi – creative direction, album art design and packaging
- Jaslyn Taylee – children's choir (track 1)
- Michael Uzowuru – executive producer, writer (tracks 1, 2, 5, 6, 12–14), production (tracks 1, 5, 6, 9, 11, 13), co-production (track 2), additional production (tracks 3, 15, 16), choir arrangement (tracks 5, 13)
- Brian Washington – management
- William Wood – writer (tracks 5, 15)
- VanJess – choir (tracks 5, 13), choir arrangement (track 13)
