= Mitch Lasky =

American businessman (born 1962)

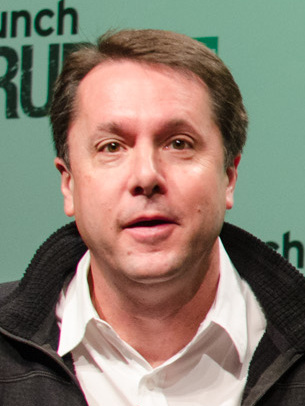
- Lasky in 2013
- Born: Mitchell Harold Lasky; January 18, 1962 (age 64); Los Angeles, California
- Education: Harvard College, University of Virginia School of Law
- Occupation: Venture Capitalist
- Employer: General Partner at Benchmark
- Spouse: Cecilia Barajas (m. 1987)
- Children: 2, including Benjamin

Mitchell Harold "Mitch" Lasky (born January 18, 1962) is a general partner at the Silicon Valley venture capital firm Benchmark and a former entrepreneur and video game executive.

== Education and early career ==
Lasky received a B.A. degree in History and Literature from Harvard College and a J.D. from the University of Virginia School of Law.

Early in his career, Lasky practiced law at the Los Angeles firm Irell & Manella, where he worked on various technology-related intellectual property cases. In 1993, he joined The Walt Disney Company. He left Disney in 1994 to launch a multiplayer online game company, Serum Entertainment Software.

Lasky subsequently spent five years at video game publisher Activision, including a stint as executive vice president of Worldwide Studios, helping to launch Quake 3, Tony Hawk's Pro Skater, and Spider-Man.

In 2000, he joined mobile games company JAMDAT as CEO, and took the company public in 2004. Electronic Arts acquired JAMDAT for $680 million in 2006. Lasky served as executive vice president of mobile and online games at Electronic Arts from 2006 to 2007, after the JAMDAT acquisition.

== Benchmark ==
Lasky joined Benchmark in 2007 as a general partner. He focuses on identifying investment opportunities in mobile, games, digital privacy and identity, and online education. He has led the firm’s investments in and serves on the boards of Snapchat, Ubiquity6, CyanogenMod, Engine Yard, Gaia, Riot Games, PlayFab, Vivox, Grockit, Gaikai, RedRobot, Meteor Entertainment, thatgamecompany, and NaturalMotion.

== Personal life ==
Mitch Lasky is the father of musician Benjamin "Quadeca" Lasky.
