= I Didn't Mean to Haunt You =

Studio album by Quadeca
- Released: November 10, 2022
- Studio: Trend Def (Los Angeles)
- Genre: Folktronica
- Length: 57:39
- Labels: DeadAir; AWAL
- Producer: Quadeca

Quadeca chronology
From Me to You (2021)	I Didn't Mean to Haunt You (2022)	Scrapyard (2024)

Singles from I Didn't Mean to Haunt You
- 1. "Born Yesterday" Released: September 19, 2022; 2. "Tell Me a Joke" Released: October 25, 2022

I Didn't Mean to Haunt You is the third studio album by the American musician Quadeca, released on November 10, 2022, through DeadAir Records and AWAL. Following his second album From Me to You in 2021, Quadeca came up with the concept for I Didn't Mean to Haunt You and contacted DeadAir, offering them to release his new album. Inspired by numerous musicians and music genres, it is a concept album written in the sounds of folktronica. Its concept revolves around a ghost in a purgatory-like state, defying typical expectations of the afterlife. Quadeca decided to keep the songs minimal to avoid overcomplicating the music, allowing the listener to connect with the album's character's journey. The album was promoted by two singles, "Born Yesterday" and "Tell Me a Joke". It was positively received by publications; the online music critic Anthony Fantano considered "Born Yesterday" one of the best songs of 2022.

== Background ==
Quadeca released his second studio album From Me to You in 2021. It received an average rating from Anthony Fantano; he thought it was ambitious and praised its production, though he disliked the vocals and lyrics. It contained elements of electronic and folk music.

The following year, Quadeca announced that he was "sitting on the greatest ever posthumous album". The announcement garnered speculation from fans that it was an album by Quadeca's late friend Sad Frosty. Instead, it was a reference to I Didn't Mean to Haunt You being written from the perspective of a ghost who took his own life. After he had created the album's concept, he contacted Jesse Taconelli of DeadAir Records, fascinated by this record label, and offered them to release it.

== Production ==
In an interview with Paper, Quadeca stated that creating I Didn't Mean to Haunt You was "less of a pivot and more like an evolution" for himself as an artist. He also dismissed his older material, commenting on how he made his debut album Voice Memos (2019) in high school with hopes of fitting in. Throughout his career, he has had multiple ideas for music to create, though he did not always have the means to realize them. As he grew up, he expanded his music taste; as he first listened to the indie rock band the Microphones, he thought to himself, "Oh shit, you can do that?". He was also inspired by numerous other musicians, such as Luiz Bonfá, Duster, Björk, Jane Remover, Simon & Garfunkel, Caroline Polachek, Lingua Ignota, the Flaming Lips, Viper, and Virtual Dream Plaza. Other influences include the music of King Krule, Slauson Malone, FKA Twigs, and Sevdaliza. He would also listen to music in the shoegaze genre, such as My Bloody Valentine's 1991 album Loveless. When making I Didn't Mean to Haunt You, he was focused on worldbuilding and reminded himself to "stay in the world of the album". He had a story and concept in mind for it, and did not want to overcomplicate the music. He treated each song as if they were fragile, forcing him to not overcomplicate the album's minimal moments. As work on the album progressed, he focused on making it more about feeling rather than being superficial.

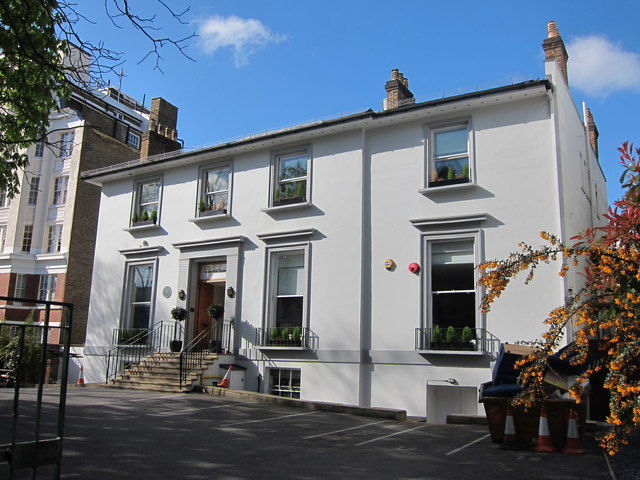
I Didn't Meant to Haunt You was mastered by Christian Wright at Abbey Road Studios in London (pictured).

The album's concept of being written from the perspective of a ghost was inspired by many things in Quadeca's life, including suicidal ideation. Although it did not affect the album's story, he felt that death "was in the air" after one of his close friends died. He was drawn to soundscapes that felt both heavenly and unsettling, often listening to music that gave a sense of ascension while creating the album. On "House Settling", he wanted the song to have a guest appearance so it could sound "abrasive". He sent a pitch to Danny Brown on Twitter, believing nobody else could execute the verse correctly, and 10 minutes after Brown responded: "Yeah, I'm gonna kill this for you. Don't worry." The album was recorded at Trend Def Studio in Los Angeles, and was mastered by Christian Wright at Abbey Road Studios in London.

== Composition ==
=== Overview ===
I Didn't Mean to Haunt You is a folktronica album that is influenced by elements of art pop, indietronica, and alternative R&B. Fred Thomas of AllMusic called it "genre-bending" and Spill Magazine's Ljubinko Zivkovic mentioned its "huge vocal harmonies and rap interludes". Thomas further acknowledged the album trading in Quadeca's "hard beats and loud rap flows" for "softer textures and intricate arrangements". It is a concept album about being a ghost in a purgatory-like state, defying typical expectations of the afterlife. Quadeca described it as "an album about grief for a ghost", and stated that the core idea behind the album is that the ghost merely wants to be noticed. The album was entirely produced by Quadeca and contains guest appearances from Brown, the Sunday Service Choir, and Thor Harris.

=== Songs ===
The opening track of I Didn't Mean to Haunt You is "Sorry4Dying", a song that mixes together elements of piano ballads, hip-hop, and alternative R&B. Its shimmering keyboards are followed by ambient and industrial passages. "Tell Me a Joke" displays Quadeca singing over ambient-textured layers; Jade Gomez from Paper described it as sounding "reminiscent of a ghost peering into the other world, begging for someone to hear". "Don't Mind Me" was written about a ghost witnessing people sort through their belongings. Fantano compared the "pop appeal" of the track to the music of Porter Robinson. "Picking Up Hands" is the only track that features exclusively guitar-playing and singing because Quadeca felt it was right to do so. A glitch, folktronica, and rap ballad, "Born Yesterday" was written from the ghost's point of view. During the song's climax, Quadeca raps, "It gets so bright, I disappear". "The Memories We Lost in Translation" serves as an extension of the previous track's instrumental interlude. Quadeca described "House Settling" as one of the album's most desperate points. It is after a story arc where the ghost wants to be noticed after being dispirited. The track presents experimental arrangements that intensely build up to "horror movie pianos", as described by Fantano. He also said Brown's verse "reinforce[s] the nightmarish imagery of the song". "Knots", which was compared by Fantano to the rock band Liars, contains an influence of post-punk, as well as electronic and glitch elements. "Fantasyworld" begins with two to three minutes of piano and vocals. The writing sees non-existence as a form of escape, with the lyrics depicting a "fantasy world" and the choice to enter it. The track builds up to a chaotic climax of saturation and distortion which was compared to the Microphones by Fantano. The penultimate track "Fractions of Infinity" contains a guest appearance from the Sunday Service Choir. The final track, "Cassini's Division", is about the idea that humans exist against their own will, striving for nothingness, and finding beauty in the void.

== Promotion and release ==
The lead single of I Didn't Mean to Haunt You, "Born Yesterday", was released on September 19, 2022, alongside its music video. The album was officially announced alongside the release of its second and final single, "Tell Me a Joke", on October 25. Though its release date was scheduled for November 11, Quadeca's distributor accidentally released the album early, leading it to be released by DeadAir and AWAL on November 10. Taconelli originally thought the album should have been released in February 2023, though Quadeca told him it needed to come out in 2022. Following the album's release, people online had thought Quadeca was "trying too hard to appeal to music lovers", to which Quadeca responded: "I'm just trying to make a good album". Though, he described the reception as "overwhelmingly positive".

== Critical reception ==
Professional ratings
Review scores
Source	Rating
The Needle Drop	7/10 (Note: Specifically, Fantano rated the album a "strong 7".)
Spill Magazine	8/10

I Didn't Mean to Haunt You was positively received. In a positive review for Spill Magazine, Zivkovic believed that the album's risks and concept "all meshes together" and called the album's concept "a tricky proposition in itself". Fantano deemed it Quadeca's best album, though he felt the second half of the album was inferior to the first. Jordan Darville of The Fader believed "Born Yesterday" represented a "significant leap forward" from Quadeca's previous work. Danny Brown's verse on the song "House Settling" was described by Mike Lesuer of Flood Magazine as pushing the song "into the realm of the goosebump-inducing" and further praised the track and album as a whole. Fantano named "Born Yesterday" as the seventh best track of 2022. He called it a "mind-blowing song" and lauded its constant changes, emotions, vocals, and guitars.

== Track listing ==
All tracks are written by Ben Lasky (Quadeca), except where noted. All tracks are produced by Quadeca.

No.	Title	Writer(s)	Length
1.	"Sorry4Dying"		4:44
2.	"Tell Me a Joke"		5:04
3.	"Don't Mind Me"		5:09
4.	"Picking Up Hands"		4:59
5.	"Born Yesterday"		6:01
6.	"The Memories We Lost in Translation"		1:42
7.	"House Settling" (featuring Danny Brown)	Lasky; Daniel Sewell	4:52
8.	"Knots"		4:11
9.	"Fantasyworld"		7:18
10.	"Fractions of Infinity" (with Sunday Service Choir)	Lasky; Mychal Brandon; Erik Brooks; Jenelle Dunkley; LaMarcus Eldridge; Chelsea Miller	5:23
11.	"Cassini's Division" (with Thor Harris)	Lasky; Thor Harris	8:16
Total length:			57:39

== Personnel ==
Credits adapted from the liner notes of I Didn't Mean to Haunt You.

- Quadeca – lead vocals, production, engineering
- Christian Wright – mastering
- Paige Prier – artwork
- Digiyams – design

== Release history ==
Release dates and format(s) for I Didn't Mean to Haunt You
Region	Date	Format(s)	Label	Edition	Ref.
United States	November 10, 2022	Streaming; digital download; CD; cassette	DeadAir	Original	
United States	October 11, 2023	LP	DeadAir	Reissue	
