= Scrapyard (mixtape) =

2024 mixtape by Quadeca

Mixtape by Quadeca
- Released: February 16, 2024
- Recorded: 2021–2023
- Genres: Alternative; indietronica; indie folk; experimental pop; experimental hip-hop
- Length: 46:07
- Labels: DeadAir; AWAL
- Producers: Quadeca; Brakence

Quadeca chronology
I Didn't Mean to Haunt You (2022)	Scrapyard (2024)	Vanisher, Horizon Scraper (2025)

Alternative cover
- Vinyl deluxe cover

Singles from Scrapyard
- 1. "A La Carte" / "U Don't Know Me Like That" Released: October 11, 2023; 2. "Dustcutter" / "Under My Skin" / "I Make It Look Effortless" Released: October 30, 2023; 3. "Even If I Tried" / "Easier" / "Guess Who?" Released: November 22, 2023; 4. "Way Too Many Friends" Released: February 15, 2024

Scrapyard is the fifth mixtape by the American musician Quadeca, released on February 16, 2024, through DeadAir Records and AWAL. It consists of songs that were cut from Quadeca's third studio album and previous release I Didn't Mean to Haunt You. Brakence and Kevin Abstract contribute guest appearances on the mixtape, which pulls influences from a variety of genres. Eight out of the fifteen songs were released ahead of the mixtape's official release in a series of three drops. A physical vinyl release adds seven more exclusive songs. Scrapyard received universal acclaim from critics, with many putting a spotlight on the eclecticism and emotional soundness of the mixtape.

== Background and recording ==
Quadeca released his third studio album I Didn't Mean to Haunt You on November 10, 2022. It represented a continuation in his artistic evolution starting with his second studio album From Me To You around a more atmospheric and avant-garde production style, shifting away from his hardcore hip-hop roots. "Dustcutter" was created in December 2021 and was originally intended to be a standalone single before the rollout of the former album. Quadeca opted out of doing this to make the album rollout more impactful.

On March 17, 2023, Quadeca released the song "Being Yourself" (a leftover from I Didn't Mean to Haunt You) exclusively on SoundCloud and said to "stay tuned for more...i got more better ones i've been keeping to myself hahahah".

== Production and composition ==
=== Overview ===
The genres of songs on the mixtape are varied, ranging from hyperpop, indie folk, and art pop to rage. Many types of instrumentation can be found on the mixtape, with lush, nature-inspired themes and also dark, isolated sounds. Some tracks contain acoustic guitars or electronic production, while distorted bass can be heard on others. The lyrics on the album deal with the common worries of those in Generation Z, although it is self-aware and, at many times, metaphorical on a sentimental and personal level. Heartbreak is also another common theme on the mixtape. Quadeca's vulnerability on the album can be compared to Frank Ocean's work, and his confidence was likened to Kanye West's.

=== Songs ===
The second track, "A La Carte", features a lively instrumental with basslines and wavering vocals, with Brakence providing a guest verse in an art pop-influenced song. Colin Jones, writing for the Campus Times, equates the illustrative lyrics to those of the indie rock band Death Cab for Cutie, while Fresh Out the Deli's Nicholas Cicale compares the basslines to Flying Lotus'. In "Pretty Privilege", Quadeca talks about his self-image in a more trap-influenced delivery, with vocal melodies near the end that can be compared to Bon Iver's. "Easier" contains Quadeca singing over a fuzzy acoustic guitar. "Even If I Tried" contains a very new sound for Quadeca with synths and percussion. "U Don't Know Me Like That" contains a strange, broken beat of distorted sounds with Quadeca doing what Matija Conic, writing for Strand Magazine, likened to a Playboi Carti "baby voice".

"Way Too Many Friends" has more rap-styled vocals over a melancholic instrumental with keyboards and ambient sounds. "Guess Who?" is a more hardcore, braggadocious song where Quadeca raps about his success and superiority over an experimental, rage, and glitch pop beat. This song can be seen as a return to Quadeca's rapping roots but combined with the artistic evolution he has undergone. "Under My Skin" contains large and atmospheric instrumentations that evoke comparisons to the shoegaze genre. "U Tried That Thing Where Ur Human" gives alien-like vibes that evoke comparisons to Björk. "Guide Dog" is another song that has Quadeca crooning on an acoustic guitar, albeit this time more stripped-back and folk-inspired, which Quadeca came to after hearing the song without percussion or additional instrumentation and concluding that the song already had everything it needed. The song's lyrics are vulnerable and were inspired by someone in Quadeca's life who has terrible eyesight, sometimes needing him to guide them around when they were without their glasses. "Texas Blue", the project's closer, is an emotional and nostalgic emo rap song about relationship troubles containing harmonic vocal layering and country music influences. Kevin Abstract has a prominent feature over a piano and string instrumentation.

== Release ==
On February 28, 2023, following the release of I Didn't Mean to Haunt You, Quadeca previewed a then-unreleased track called "undermyskin.mp4" on Twitter and said that it was "some shit that will never come out probably". This song was later included as "Under My Skin" on Scrapyard. "Being Yourself" was also released exclusively on SoundCloud on March 17 as a leftover. On September 10, he teased a new project, and on September 28, he revealed "A La Carte" with Brakence.

On October 3, Quadeca announced the Scrapyard Series, in which he was to preview eight tracks in three extended plays, Scrapyard I, II, and III. He was originally going to drop a fourth and fifth extended play, but the idea was abandoned. The whole mixtape, with all fifteen songs, was released on February 16, 2024.

== Critical reception ==
Professional ratings
Review scores
Source	Rating
Campus Times	9/10
Decaturian	8.2/10
Fresh Out the Deli	3/5 stars
KRUI-FM	8.2/10
The Needle Drop	9/10 (Note: Specifically, Fantano rated the album a "strong 8 to a light 9".)
WSUM	8.5/10

Scrapyard received universal acclaim from critics. Colin Jones, writing for the University of Rochester's Campus Times, noted the eccentricity of the mixtape and highlighted the variance of each song as well as the production and vocal delivery. He noted the stylistic similarity of the album to work by 100 gecs, JPEGMafia, and Bright Eyes. Nicholas Cicale, writing for Fresh Out the Deli, praised Quadeca's creativity and artistic flexibility, but thought that some parts of the record were overdramatic and not well-mixed. He also stated that, since there was such a wide variety of styles on the mixtape, none especially stood out. Maurice Crawford, of KRUI-FM, likened Quadeca to a jack of all trades, master of none and recommended the he stick to a certain style. Strand Magazine's Matija Conic gave a positive review, calling attention to the solidarity of each song and the controlled messiness. Anthony Fantano gave the album a 9/10, highlighting the emotional aspects and lyrics that come with the orchestrated production of "bangers" that show Quadeca's artistic evolution. Jack Anderson, writing for WSUM, emphasized the cohesiveness and emotional aspects of the album, in addition to how it brought all of its many influences together.

=== Year-end lists ===
Scrapyard appeared in some year-end lists for the best albums of that year, including in lists by KTLA, The Needle Drop, and The State Press, even reaching the number one spot on the latter. HotNewHipHop also included the mixtape on its half-year ranking.

Select year-end rankings for Scrapyard
Publication/critic	List	Rank	Ref.
Campus Times	Top 10 Best Albums of 2024	3	
KTLA	The 10 Best Albums of 2024	7	
The Needle Drop	Top 50 Best Albums of 2024	12	
The State Press	Editor's Pick: The Top 10 Albums of 2024	1	

== Track listing ==
All tracks are written by Benjamin Lasky, except for "A La Carte", written with Randy Findell, and "Texas Blue", written with Ian Simpson. All tracks are produced by Quadeca, except for "A La Carte", produced with Brakence.

Scrapyard track listing
No.	Title	Length
1.	"Dustcutter"	2:44
2.	"A La Carte" (with Brakence)	3:01
3.	"Pretty Privilege"	3:14
4.	"Easier"	3:25
5.	"Even if I Tried"	3:25
6.	"What's It to Him?"	2:34
7.	"U Don't Know Me Like That"	3:27
8.	"I Make It Look Effortless"	1:07
9.	"Way Too Many Friends"	2:08
10.	"Guess Who?"	3:04
11.	"Under My Skin"	2:36
12.	"Being Yourself"	3:05
13.	"U Tried That Thing Where Ur Human"	4:43
14.	"Guide Dog"	2:01
15.	"Texas Blue" (with Kevin Abstract)	5:23
Total length:		46:07

Vinyl version (bonus tracks)
No.	Title	Length
1.	"Perfectly Cut Scream"	2:02
2.	"Like Me"	2:20
3.	"123"	1:28
4.	"Mad at Me"	2:43
5.	"1 Step Program"	1:31
6.	"Lifespan"	2:03
7.	"Who I Am"	1:31
Total length:		59:45

Notes

- All songs on the main mixtape are stylized in uppercase, for example, "Dustcutter" is written as "DUSTCUTTER".
- All songs on the vinyl version of the mixtape are stylized in lowercase, for example, "Perfectly Cut Scream" is written as "perfectly cut scream".

== Personnel ==
Credits adapted from the liner notes of Scrapyard.

- Quadeca – lead vocals, production, engineering
- Paige Prier – artwork
- Sam Arnold – bass
- Yung Men – drums
- Autumn Beviacqua – flute
- Johan Lenox – strings
- YAS – violin

== Charts ==
Chart performance for Scrapyard
Chart (2023)	Peak position
US & Canadian College Radio Top 200 (NACC)	35
