= Love Spells =

American musician (born 2004 or 2005)

- Born: Sir Taegen C'aion Harris; September 29, 2004 (age 22); Houston, Texas
- Genres: Dream pop; alternative pop; indie rock
- Years active: 2021–present
- Label: RCA
- Website: www.lovespellsmusic.com

Sir Taegen C'aion Harris (Note: "Sir" is a part of Harris' given name, not an honorific.) (born 2004), also known as Love Spells, is an American musician and singer-songwriter from Houston, Texas. He gained popularity in 2025 with his EP The Love I Showed You Was Yours To Keep and was featured on over half of the tracks on Kevin Abstract's 2025 album Blush. In 2026, he released his debut studio album, Love Is the Law.

== Early life ==
Sir Taegen C'aion Harris was born in 2004 in Houston, Texas. He moved around a lot as a child; at one point, he was living with his godfather in Dickinson, Texas. Harris battled depression when he was younger and read many fantasy novels to combat it, including Percy Jackson & the Olympians, Artemis Fowl, and Eragon. He eventually made his way into poetry, which inspired him to start rapping in middle school in a group called 38 Mama. Harris' music back then was inspired by Lil Peep and Lil Tracy. He did not pick up music again until he was seventeen.

== Career ==
In his early music career, Harris was homeless and was struggling to get his music noticed outside of Houston, leading to his manager to encourage him to move to Los Angeles for six months. During this time, Harris released his third EP, The Love I Showed You Was Yours To Keep, on May 22, 2025, through Loveless Records. Initially meant to have been released on May 9, it combined alternative R&B, hip-hop production, and indie songwriting and contained themes of mental health, heartbreak, and love. He made the album while not having many close friends, feeling that everyone he met just wanted to party and do drugs. Harris had felt isolated because all he did every day was go to the studio. Later, he began to spend time with Kevin Abstract, living with him and creating music, with Abstract serving as his mentor. In June, Harris made guest appearances on ten out of the nineteen tracks on Abstract's album Blush, including the supergroup Geezer's debut single, "Doggy".

In May 2026, Harris announced his debut studio album, Love Is the Law, having released its lead single "Crutch", a month earlier. The album was released on July 24 through RCA and contained contributions from Rick Nowels and Rodaidh McDonald. Harris stated that he was inspired by '70s, '80s, new wave music, and nights at Numbers, a Houston dance club, in the creation of the album.

== Influences and artistry ==
Harris' music is characterized by his light, ethereal falsetto with atmospheric, spacey, and guitar-driven instrumentals. He has stated that he is influenced by Mazzy Star, Solange Knowles, The Sundays, and Sufjan Stevens. Kathryn Keller of Melodic Magazine noted his transparent, raw, and emotional lyrics, likening his musical style to that of Cigarettes After Sex, Searows, Cocteau Twins, or The Japanese House.

== Discography ==
=== Studio albums ===
Title	Details
Love Is the Law	Released: July 24, 2026; Label: RCA; Formats: Digital download

=== Extended plays ===
Title	Details
Eyeliner	Released: November 6, 2021; Label: murkisfuneral; Formats: Digital download
Love Lies Bleeding	Released: June 20, 2022; Label: Self-released; Formats: Digital download
The Love I Showed You Was Yours To Keep	Released: May 22, 2025; Label: Loveless; Formats: LP, digital download

=== Singles ===
Title	Year	Album
"Darling, have you seen my soul?"	2021	Non-album single
"Lost In A Daydream"	2021	Non-album single
"Whispers in my head"	2021	Non-album single
"Aqua Darling"	2021	Non-album single
"Love Me"	2022	Non-album single
"We Don't Need Direction"	2022	Non-album single
"Never Too Late to Cry"	2022	Non-album single
"Come Over and Love Me"	2022	Non-album single
"Over and Over"	2023	Non-album single
"Flow"	2023	Non-album single
"Obsessed With Your Mind"	2023	Non-album single
"Dope Sick"	2024	Non-album single
"Love Costs"	2024	Non-album single
"Lie"	2024	Non-album single
"With Only Your Mouth"	2024	Non-album single
"Lovers Only"	2025	The Love I Showed You Was Yours To Keep
"Reach Out And Kiss Me"	2025	The Love I Showed You Was Yours To Keep
"How?"	2025	The Love I Showed You Was Yours To Keep
"Wish I Didn't Love You"	2025	Non-album single
"Crutch"	2026	Love Is the Law
"Keep It To Yourself"	2026	Love Is the Law
"Maybe I Still Love You"	2026	Love Is the Law
