= Kevin Abstract =

American rapper and singer (born 1996)

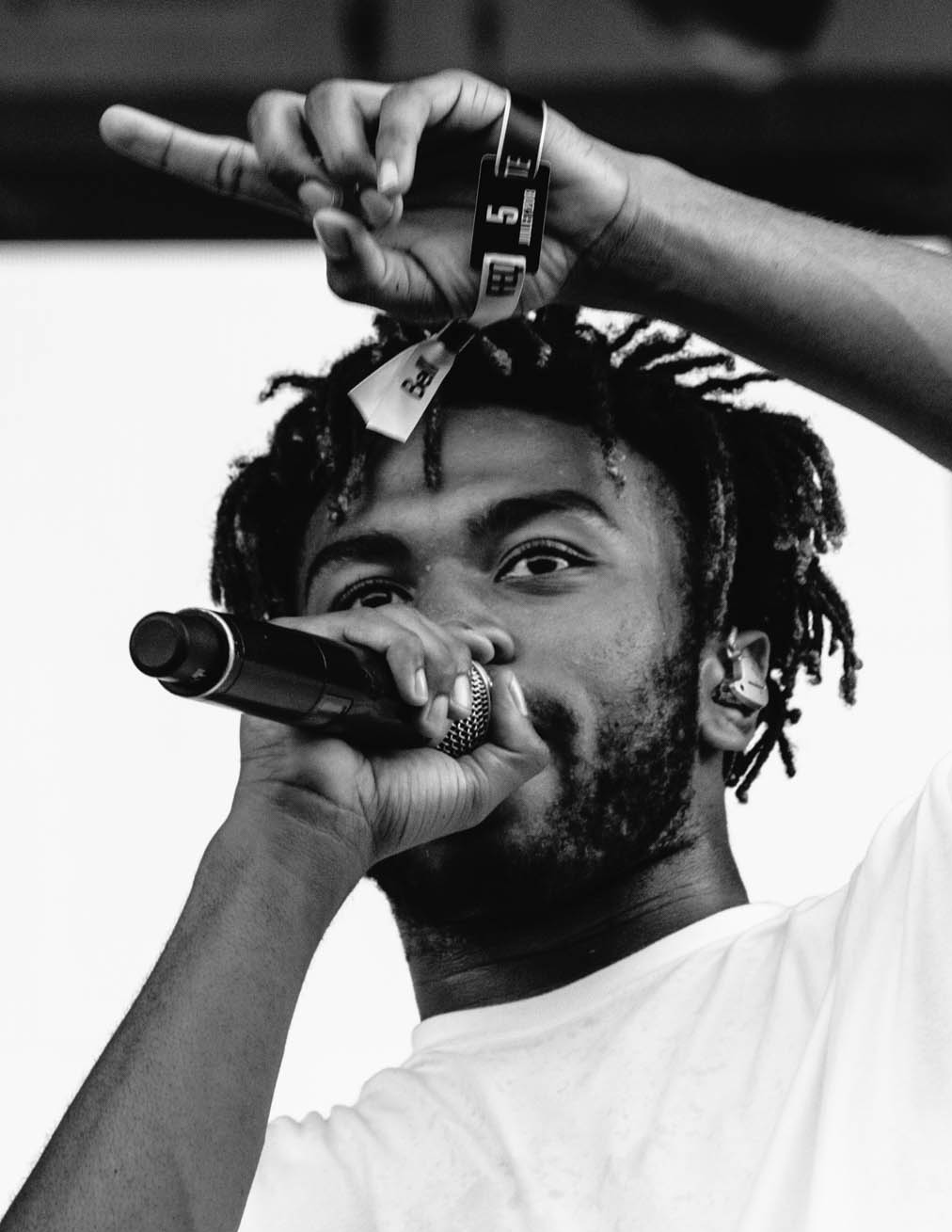
- Abstract performing in 2018 in Quebec City

Background information
- Also known as: Ian Simpson; Billy Star; Kevin Cinema
- Born: Clifford Ian Simpson; July 16, 1996 (age 30); Corpus Christi, Texas, U.S.
- Origin: Corpus Christi, Texas, U.S.
- Genres: Hip-hop; pop; R&B; alternative rock
- Occupations: Rapper; singer; record producer
- Years active: 2009–present
- Labels: Virgin; RCA; Question Everything; Video Store; X8; Juno
- Member of: Blush; Geezer
- Formerly of: Brockhampton; AliveSinceForever
- Website: clifford73.com

Clifford Ian Simpson (July 16, 1996), known by his stage name Kevin Abstract, is an American rapper, singer, and producer, best known as the founder and de facto leader of hip-hop group Brockhampton. With Brockhampton, Abstract released eight studio albums from 2017 to 2022. He has released solo work since 2009, and self-released his debut albums MTV1987 (2014) and American Boyfriend: A Suburban Love Story (2016) to significant attention from online blogs and music publications. He made his major label debut with Arizona Baby in 2019. After Brockhampton disbanded in 2022, he released Blanket (2023) and a mixtape, Glue (2024). His fifth studio album, Blush, was released on June 27, 2025.

Along with his work in Brockhampton, Abstract has served as a songwriter, producer, and collaborator for several other artists. In 2020, Abstract and Romil Hemnani founded Video Store, a record label and apparel company that signed the Blossom, Christian Alexander, and SoGone SoFlexy, among others, before dissolving in 2023. In 2025, he founded the Houston-based collective Blush, and co-founded the record label Juno with Dominic Fike, with whom he also forms the duo Geezer.

== Early life ==
Abstract was born in Corpus Christi, Texas, on July 16, 1996. Abstract's mother was distant during his childhood; he did not know what her profession was. As Abstract began to realize his sexuality, he isolated himself from his family, feeling ashamed. It is speculated that this was one of the reasons that he ran away from home. Abstract has stated that his family members are "extremely religious" Mormons. Abstract began producing music at 11 and ran away from home at 15, staying at a friend's house for a year before moving to Georgia to live with his sister. In high school, Abstract met and began making music with his future Brockhampton bandmates Ameer Vann, Matt Champion, Merlyn Wood, and Joba.

== Music career ==
=== 2009-2022: Brockhampton ===
In 2009, at thirteen years old, Abstract founded the internet music collective AliveSinceForever, after recruiting members from a Kanye West fan forum. In 2014, AliveSinceForever reformed as Brockhampton alongside a relocation to San Marcos, Texas. In 2017, the group moved to Los Angeles and released their critically acclaimed debut albums Saturation, Saturation II, and Saturation III, and in early 2018 they signed a record deal with RCA Records. Their major label debut, Iridescence (2018), debuted atop the Billboard 200, while Ginger (2019) produced the double-platinum single "Sugar". Brockhampton announced their intention to disband before releasing their sixth studio album, Roadrunner: New Light, New Machine (2021). In 2022, the group disbanded after releasing their final studio albums, The Family and TM.

=== 2013-2015: MTV1987 ===
In May 2013, Abstract released the single "Angels", a collaboration with his AliveSinceForever and Brockhampton bandmate Dom McLennon. In July, he was a featured artist on Ameer Vann's single "Rabbits". In September, Abstract released his eponymous debut EP. In 2014, Abstract and Brockhampton producer Romil Hemnani began work on the former's debut studio album. From April to May, he released the singles "Save" and "Drugs" in promotion of the album. MTV1987 was released on July 15, 2014, to positive attention from several music blogs. In November, he released a music video for "Hell/Heroina", which was funded using over $3,000 accrued from a Kickstarter campaign. The music video for "Save" premiered on June 23, 2015.

=== 2015-17: American Boyfriend: A Suburban Love Story ===
In 2015, Abstract began working on his sophomore album, Death of a Supermodel. In April, he released the singles "Not on DOASM 01", featuring Ameer Vann and Matt Champion and "Not on DOASM 2", featuring Champion, two tracks that were cut from Death of a Supermodel. By late 2015, Death of a Supermodel was reannounced as They Shoot Horses, and was given a 2016 release date. In November, the lead single from the album, "Echo", was released alongside an accompanying music video. In September 2016, the album was retitled yet again, to American Boyfriend: A Suburban Love Story, alongside the release of the single "Empty", alongside a self-directed music video. On November 2, Abstract released the singles "Yellow" and "Miserable America" through Beats 1, along with announcing the album's release date of November 18. In December, Abstract hosted a free one-off concert in Los Angeles, The All-American Drive-in Prom, with special guests Tyler, the Creator and Jaden Smith. In February 2017, he embarked on the Death of a Supermodel Tour in support of American Boyfriend. Also in 2017, Abstract toured alongside rock band The Neighbourhood.

=== 2019: Arizona Baby ===
In April 2019, Abstract began cryptically teasing a new project on social media. On April 8, he officially announced his third studio album, Arizona Baby, alongside a music video for the track "Big Wheels". On April 11, he released an EP, also titled Arizona Baby, consisting of the first three tracks from the upcoming album. On April 18, the next part of the album, Ghettobaby, was released. On April 25, Arizona Baby was released in full, alongside a music video for "Peach", featuring Dominic Fike, Joba, and Bearface.

=== 2021-2023: Blanket ===
In March 2021, Abstract and his Brockhampton bandmate Romil Hemnani founded the record label and apparel company Video Store. In April, he and Hemnani contributed to the debut EP by the Blossom, which was released on Video Store on April 6. On July 16, Abstract released the single "Slugger", featuring fellow rappers Slowthai and Snot. On August 19, he followed up "Slugger" with "Sierra Nights", featuring frequent collaborator Ryan Beatty.

On October 4, 2023, nearly one year after Brockhampton disbanded, Abstract released "Blanket", the lead single from the album of the same name, a week after playing surprise shows at the Hollywood Forever Cemetery in Los Angeles and Baby's All Right in Brooklyn. The next single, "What Should I Do?", was released on October 18, followed by "Running Out" and "Madonna" on October 25, and November 1, respectively. Blanket was released on November 3, as Abstract's fourth solo album on RCA and Video Store.

=== 2024–present: Glue and Blush ===
In 2024, Abstract released a series of singles, including "Tennessee" featuring Lil Nas X, "Creek" featuring Nourished by Time, "You're My Type of Pleasure", "Diamonds & Cash" featuring Lil Yachty and HVN, and "Big Dog", as part of an unrealized project titled Glue. Although not officially released, these tracks were unofficially released by Abstract in the form of YouTube and SoundCloud uploads.

In May 2025, Abstract began cryptically teasing a new project with the phrase "June 2025" attached to images of various friends and collborators. On May 29, he unofficially released the standalone track "Ghetto Graduation", in collaboration with Lil Saint and former Brockhampton member Ameer Vann. On June 7, Abstract officially announced his fifth studio album, Blush, recorded alongside a collective of Houston artists also known as Blush. At the same time, he released the lead single and music video "Geezer", reuniting him with Dominic Fike. Blush was officially released on June 27 and was co-executive produced by Abstract and Quadeca. It includes features from Fike, Quadeca, Vann, JPEGMafia, and Danny Brown, along with several local Houston musicians. In July, Abstract and Fike announced the formalization of their relationship as the duo Geezer, and released their debut single "Doggy", featuring Blush members Love Spells and Truly Young.

In 2026, Abstract opened for Lorde on the Oceania leg of her Ultrasound World Tour.

== Other ventures ==
In 2021, Abstract started the clothing brand and record label Video Store with fellow Brockhampton member Romil Hemnani. Aside from releasing Abstract's fourth project, Blanket (2023), the label also released projects by the Blossom, Christian Alexander, and SoGone SoFlexy. Video Store Apparel released its debut spring and summer clothing line, "Warhead", on July 16, 2021. Video Store's fall and winter 2021 collection, "Our Good Dreams Go Into the Sky", was released on November 19, 2021.

Abstract served as a creative consultant on the second season of the HBO teen drama Euphoria.

== Influences ==
Abstract said his influences for MTV1987 were Frank Ocean, Justin Timberlake, and Kid Cudi. Abstract has described Kanye West, Pink Floyd, Radiohead, Childish Gambino, Outkast, Lana Del Rey and Tyler, the Creator as influences on his music, with Tyler's group, Odd Future, being a large point of reference and inspiration for Brockhampton.

== Personal life ==
Abstract came out as gay in 2016, and his lyrics often mention his sexuality. He has stated he will rap about being gay as long as he can imagine a fan in need of a voice. Abstract announced via Twitter that he was in a relationship with fashion designer Nick Holiday in September 2022, however they reportedly broke up in early 2024.

== Selected discography ==
=== Studio albums ===
List of studio albums
Title	Album details	Peak chart positions				
Title	Album details	US	US R&B/HH	US Rap	AUS	CAN
MTV1987	Released: July 15, 2014; Label: Self-released; Formats: Streaming	—	—	—	—	—
American Boyfriend: A Suburban Love Story	Released: November 18, 2016; Label: Question Everything, Empire; Formats: CD, DL, streaming	—	—	—	—	—
Arizona Baby	Released: April 25, 2019; Label: Question Everything, RCA; Formats: LP, DL, streaming	53	29	24	87	93
Blanket	Released: November 3, 2023; Label: Video Store, RCA; Formats: CD, LP, DL, streaming	—	—	—	—	—
Blush	Released: June 27, 2025; Label: Juno, X8, Virgin Music Group; Formats: CD, LP, DL, streaming	—	—	—	—	—
Honey in My Hair	TBA					

=== Demo albums ===
List of collaborative albums
Title	Album details
Blush Demo Tape	Released: June 8, 2025; Label: Self-released; Format: Streaming

==== With Brockhampton ====
- Saturation (2017)
- Saturation II (2017)
- Saturation III (2017)
- Iridescence (2018)
- Ginger (2019)
- Roadrunner: New Light, New Machine (2021)
- The Family (2022)
- TM (2022)

=== Singles ===
List of singles showing year released and album name
Title	Year	Album
"Save"	2014	MTV1987
"Drugs"	2014	MTV1987
"Echo"	2015	American Boyfriend: A Suburban Love Story
"Empty"	2016	American Boyfriend: A Suburban Love Story
"Yellow"	2016	American Boyfriend: A Suburban Love Story
"Miserable America"	2016	American Boyfriend: A Suburban Love Story
"Slugger" (featuring $NOT & Slowthai)	2021	Non-album singles
"Sierra Nights" (featuring Ryan Beatty)	2021	Non-album singles
"Eye Eye Eye" (with $NOT)	2022	Ethereal
"Dear Ms. Holloway" (with Easy Life)	2022	Maybe in Another Life...
"Easy v2" (with Baird)	2022	Non-album single
"Blanket"	2023	Blanket
"What Should I Do"	2023	Blanket
"Running Out"	2023	Blanket
"Madonna"	2023	Blanket
"Tennessee" (featuring Lil Nas X)	2024	Non-album single
"Once in a Lifetime"	2024	Everyone's Getting Involved
"Creek" (featuring Nourished by Time)	2024	Non-album singles
"You're My Type of Pleasure"	2024	Non-album singles
"Jefferson"	2024	Non-album singles
"Diamondz & Cash" (featuring Lil Yachty & HVN)	2024	Non-album singles
"Big Dog"	2024	Non-album singles
"Geezer" (with Dominic Fike)	2025	Blush

=== Other certified songs ===
Year	Song	Certifications	Album
2019	"Peach"	RIAA: Platinum	Arizona Baby

== Filmography ==
Year	Title				
Year	Title	Director	Role	Medium	Notes
2014	mtv1987	No	Himself	Documentary	
2015	Dreams Die Young	No	Himself	Short Series	
2016	All-American Trash Documentary	No	Himself	Documentary	
2017	Helmet Boy	Yes	Helmet Boy	Short Series	
2017	American Boyband	No	Himself	Documentary Series	
2017	Jennifer's Tour, A Live Show By Brockhampton	No	Himself	Documentary Series	
2017	Billy Star	Yes	Helmet Boy	Short Film	
2017	Saturation Documentary	No	Himself	Documentary	
2018	Love Your Parents Tour	No	Himself	Documentary Series	
2018	The Longest Summer in America	Yes (Note: Credited under the alias Dude Heifetz.)	Himself	Documentary	
2019	Keeping The Band	Yes	Himself	Series	
2020-2021	In-Focus	Yes	None	Interview Series	
2021	Euphoria	No	None	Series	Creative Consultant
2022	Christmas Special Vol. 1	No	Himself	Short Film	Executive Producer

=== Music videos ===
List of music videos as Kevin Abstract
Title	Year	Album(s)	Director(s)
"Drugs"	2014	MTV1987	Kevin Abstract, Henock Sileshi, Franklin Mendez
"Hell/Heroina"	2014	MTV1987	Tyler Mitchell
"Save"	2015	MTV1987	Ian Gilner, Henock Sileshi
"Echo"	2016	American Boyfriend: A Suburban Love Story	Tyler Mitchell
"Empty"	2016	American Boyfriend: A Suburban Love Story	Kevin Abstract
"Runner"	2017	American Boyfriend: A Suburban Love Story	Kevin Abstract
"Miserable America"	2017	American Boyfriend: A Suburban Love Story	Kevin Abstract
"The 1-9-9-9 Is Coming" (Note: "The 1-9-9-9 Is Coming" serves as a music video and teaser for the track Big Wheels on Arizona Baby.)	2019	Arizona Baby	Kevin Abstract
"I Got Georgia On My Mind" (Note: "I Got Georgia On My Mind" serves as a music video and teaser for the track Georgia on Arizona Baby.)	2019	Arizona Baby	Kevin Abstract
"Baby Boy"	2019	Arizona Baby	Kevin Abstract
"Peach"	2019	Arizona Baby	Kevin Abstract
"Slugger" (featuring $NOT & Slowthai)	2021	—N/a	Kevin Abstract
"Sierra Nights" (featuring Ryan Beatty)	2021	—N/a	Kevin Abstract
"Blanket"	2023	Blanket	Kevin Abstract, Cole Bat

List of music videos directed
Title	Year	Album(s)	Director(s)
"Flip Mo" (Merlyn Wood featuring Dom McLennon)	2016	ALL-AMERICAN TRASH	Kevin Abstract
"Cannon"	2017	—N/a	Kevin Abstract
"Face"	2017	Saturation	Kevin Abstract
"Heat"	2017	Saturation	Kevin Abstract
"Gold"	2017	Saturation	Kevin Abstract
"Star"	2017	Saturation	Kevin Abstract
"Lamb"	2017	Saturation Drafts	Kevin Abstract
"Gummy"	2017	Saturation II	Kevin Abstract
"Swamp"	2017	Saturation II	Kevin Abstract
"Junky"	2017	Saturation II	Kevin Abstract
"Sweet"	2017	Saturation II	Kevin Abstract
"Follow"	2017	Saturation Drafts	Kevin Abstract
"Boys"	2017	Saturation	Kevin Abstract
"Boogie"	2017	Saturation III	Kevin Abstract
"Rental"	2017	Saturation III	Kevin Abstract
"Bruise" (Note: A music video for the song "Bruise" by Ryan Beatty.)	2018	Boy in Jeans	Kevin Abstract
"1999 Wildfire"	2018	—N/a	Kevin Abstract
"1998 Truman"	2018	—N/a	Kevin Abstract
"1997 Diana"	2018	—N/a	Kevin Abstract
"San Marcos"	2018	Iridescence	Kevin Abstract
"New Orleans"	2018	Iridescence	Kevin Abstract
"Thug Life"	2018	Iridescence	Kevin Abstract
"This is Dominic Fike" (Note: "This is Dominic Fike" is an alternate music video for the single 3 Nights by Dominic Fike.)	2019	Don't Forget About Me, Demos	Kevin Abstract
"Heaven Belongs to You"	2019	Ginger	Kevin Abstract
"Dearly Departed"	2019	Ginger	Kevin Abstract
"Sugar"	2019	Ginger	Kevin Abstract
"Sugar" (Note: Due to NSFW content and nudity included in the original music video, an alternate version was released intended for a younger audience.)	2020	Ginger	Kevin Abstract
"Buzzcut" (featuring Danny Brown)	2021	Roadrunner: New Light, New Machine	Kevin Abstract, Dan Streit
"Brockhampton Presents: Count On Me" (Note: "Brockhampton Presents: Count On Me" is a music video composed of the tracks "Count On Me" and "Roberto's Interlude" from their album Roadrunner: New Light, New Machine)	2021	Roadrunner: New Light, New Machine	Kevin Abstract, Dan Streit
