= Arizona Baby =

- Cover used for final album, as well as its first part

Studio album by Kevin Abstract
- Released: April 25, 2019
- Recorded: 2018–2019
- Studios: Electric Lady, New York City
- Genres: Hip-hop; pop
- Length: 32:24
- Labels: Question Everything; RCA
- Producers: Jack Antonoff; Romil Hemnani; Kevin Abstract; Jabari Manwa

Kevin Abstract chronology
American Boyfriend: A Suburban Love Story (2016)	Arizona Baby (2019)	Blanket (2023)

Alternative cover
- Cover used for Ghettobaby, the album's second part

Arizona Baby (stylized in all caps) is the third studio album by American rapper Kevin Abstract, released on April 25, 2019, by Question Everything, Inc. through RCA Records. The album was released cumulatively, with the eponymous first part (stylized as ARIZONA baby) released on April 11, followed by a second part titled Ghettobaby on April 18. It was primarily produced by Jack Antonoff and Abstract's fellow Brockhampton member Romil Hemnani, with several other members of Brockhampton providing additional production, vocals, and instrumentation.

== Release and promotion ==
Kevin Abstract teased the project in March 2019, sharing its artwork without explanation. On April 8, a music video for "Big Wheels" was released, under the video title "The 1-9-9-9 is Coming", alongside an image teasing the dates April 11, April 18 and April 25. On April 11, following a teaser video for "Georgia" the three-song project was released, with Ghettobaby announced to be forthcoming. On April 16 Abstract clarified that Arizona Baby would be his second full-length album, being released gradually. Ghettobaby was released on April 18, including the previously released music alongside three new tracks, and was promoted by a music video for "Baby Boy". The complete album was released on April 25, following a music video for "Peach".

== Music and lyrics ==
Abstract has cited Lana Del Rey's "Venice Bitch" (also co-produced by Antonoff) as inspiring the album, as well as "Westcoast Collective" by American rapper Dominic Fike, who appeared on the final album.

The first part of Arizona Baby was described as "stand[ing] on the cutting edge of modern hip-hop", taking an experimental approach to pop songwriting. The album juxtaposes gentle vocoders and acoustic guitars against "galloping" production and rapping. "Big Wheels" features "sparkling synths and skittering beats", and has been compared to Abstract's hip-hop work with Brockhampton, while "Joy Ride" is built around trumpets and has been noted to demonstrate producer Jack Antonoff's influence. "Georgia" has been described as tender and nostalgic.

Ghettobaby, the album's second part has been described as increasingly personal, discussing Abstract's childhood, former friendships and insecurity, and featuring mostly sung R&B-hip-hop fusions. "Corpus Christi" contains a reference to former Brockhampton member Ameer Vann, who was fired from the group following domestic abuse allegations. "Baby Boy" is a psychedelic rock song, with plucked guitar and distant synthesizers.

== Critical reception ==
=== Part one ===
Professional ratings
Aggregate scores
Source	Rating
Metacritic	76/100
Review scores
Source	Rating
Highsnobiety	4.5/5 stars
HipHopDX	4.0/5
The Line of Best Fit	8.5/10
NME	4/5 stars
Pitchfork	6.9/10
Sputnikmusic	3.9/5

Hannah Mylrea of NME described the project as "short-but-sweet", praising its polished and focused nature compared to Abstract's previous work with Brockhampton, and describing it as "a neat reminder of [his] talent". For The Line of Best Fit, Sophie Walker wrote that the album "demonstrates [Abstract's] chameleon-like talent for creating everything from the most infectious beats to the gentlest verses".

== Track listing ==
The album's parts were released cumulatively, meaning Ghettobaby also includes part one, and the final release includes all three parts, without a specified distinction between each part.

Part one
No.	Title	Writer(s)	Producer(s)	Length
1.	"Big Wheels"	Ian Simpson; Jack Antonoff; Romil Hemnani	Antonoff; Kevin Abstract; Hemnani	1:40
2.	"Joyride"	Evan Smith; Simpson; Antonoff; Hemnani	Antonoff; Hemnani	3:35
3.	"Georgia"	Simpson; Antonoff; Hemnani	Antonoff; Hemnani	3:39

Part two (Ghettobaby)
No.	Title	Writer(s)	Producer(s)	Length
4.	"Corpus Christi"	Simpson; Antonoff; Hemnani	Antonoff; Hemnani	2:55
5.	"Baby Boy"	Simpson; Ryan Beatty; Austin Anderson; Hemnani; Antonoff; Kenneth B. Edmonds; Khris Riddick-Tynes	Antonoff; Hemnani	3:32
6.	"Mississippi"	Simpson; Antonoff; Hemnani	Antonoff; Hemnani	3:39

Part three
No.	Title	Writer(s)	Producer(s)	Length
7.	"Use Me"	Simpson; Antonoff; Hemnani; A. Jeffrey LaValley	Antonoff; Hemnani	2:12
8.	"Peach"	Simpson; Dominic Fike; Hemnani; Jabari Manwarring; Antonoff; Russell Boring; Ciarán McDonald	Jabari Manwa; Antonoff; Hemnani	2:57
9.	"American Problem"	Simpson; Antonoff; Hemnani; Abhirath Raju	Antonoff; Hemnani	3:11
10.	"Crumble"	Simpson; Hemnani; Beatty; Fike; Antonoff; Boring	Antonoff; Hemnani	3:08
11.	"Boyer"	Simpson; Hemnani	Abstract; Hemnani	1:57
Total length:				32:21

== Personnel ==
Musicians

- Kevin Abstract – keyboards (1), programming (1)
- Austin Anderson – keyboards (5)
- Jack Antonoff – keyboards (1–4, 6), programming (1–4, 6), guitar (1–4, 6, 7, 10), drums (2–4, 6), percussion (2), bass (3), piano (6), organ (7), background vocals (10)
- Bearface – background vocals (8)
- Ryan Beatty – vocals (5), background vocals (10)
- Russell "Joba" Boring – background vocals (8), bass (8, 10)
- Dominic Fike – background vocals (8, 10), guitar (8)
- Romil Hemnani – keyboards (1, 2, 4, 6), programming (1, 2, 4, 6, 10), guitar (1, 6), piano (6)
- Cole Kamen-Green – trumpet (2)
- Evan Smith – saxophone (1–3), flute (1)

Engineers

- Jack Antonoff – mixing (8, 10)
- Brandon Boost – engineering (1–7, 9, 11)
- Tom Elmhirst – mixing (1–7, 9, 11)
- Romil Hemnani – recording (5, 7–11)
- Vlado Meller – mastering (all tracks)
- John Rooney – assistance (1–6)
- Laura Sisk – recording (1–7, 9)
- Eli Walker – recording (1)

== Charts ==
Chart performance for Arizona Baby
Chart (2019)	Peak position
Australian Albums (ARIA)	87
Belgian Albums (Ultratop Flanders)	197
Lithuanian Albums (AGATA)	56
US Billboard 200	53

== Release history ==
Release history and formats for Arizona Baby
Release	Date	Label	Format
Part one	April 11, 2019	Question Everything, Inc, RCA	Digital download, streaming
Parts one and two (Ghettobaby)	April 18, 2019	Question Everything, Inc, RCA	Digital download, streaming
Full album	April 25, 2019	Question Everything, Inc, RCA	Digital download, streaming
