= Quiet Luke =

American singer, songwriter and instrumentalist

- Also known as: Quiet Luke・A. L. Bahta
- Born: Alexander Luke Bahta; Broward County, Florida, United States
- Years active: 2016–present
- Website: quietluke.com

Alexander Luke Bahta is an American musician and conceptual artist known by the alias Quiet Luke.

== Early life ==
Bahta grew up in Broward County, in a suburb west of Fort Lauderdale, FL. His mother enrolled him in piano lessons when he was around five years old. He cites his experiences in choir and his immersion in the craft of beat-making in his teen years as influential to his musical direction.

He chose the name Quiet Luke around the age of 16 and began releasing music on the internet. He has said that he chose the name because he "loved how it looked on paper."

== Career ==
=== Beginnings ===
He moved to New York City in 2013 to study music production under Nick Sansano and Bob Power at The Clive Davis Institute of Recorded Music from which he graduated in 2017.

Bahta premiered his debut single "Where U Were" with The Fader on July 12, 2016 via Mermaid Avenue, an imprint of Mom + Pop Music. He released his debut EP, Beholden, on October 21, 2016. Crack Magazine described the EP as the "intersection of far-reaching pop sensibilities and triumphant choral majesty."

In 2017 he studied abroad in Berlin, where he was introduced to AI and blockchain in a class taught by Mat Dryhurst. He became interested in krautrock as well as electronic music, immersing himself in the club scene of the city. He released a single "I Wanna Go" and a subsequent EP, Your Happy Place, in the fall of 2017.

=== 21st Century Blue and the Covid Era ===
He released the single "Something to Lose," on August 13, 2019 along with a cinematic music video. After a series of singles, music videos, and live performances throughout the fall, he released his debut album, 21st Century Blue, on December 4, 2019. The album is an audio-visual time capsule of his adolescence and an experimental rock epic with nods to plunderphonics and hypnagogic pop. In an interview with Document Journal, Bahta said that Picasso's Blue Period, Hamlet, and Blade Runner 2049 were among the inspirations for the work. The listening party for the album featured a large bust of the artist carved from a block of ice. He played a show at Dartmouth College on January 31, 2020 where a limited edition hoodie was sold with text that referenced the famous opening line of A Tale of Two Cities: "it was the beginning of times, it was the end of times."

The COVID-19 pandemic marked a significant gap in Bahta's public output as a musician. In a 2022 interview, he expressed that "he doesn’t think the medium [he] would best be able to express [himself] in has been invented yet," and he noted that he had been doing scoring work for fashion brands. In April 2023 he released an A-A side single "K0D / 43VR," with visuals filmed in "epic liminal spaces," such as Times Square, the American Dream Meadowlands, and the Oculus.

==== Club Chess ====
In 2023, he founded Club Chess, a conceptual social club, spatial design praxis, and weekly event series "somewhere between performance art, a salon and an experimental party space." It fuses downtown culture, audiophile culture, and chess in an attempt "to dismantle the game’s austerity." Being neither a real chess club nor tied to a brick and mortar, Club Chess is described as "a conductive material, or the keystone for a social sculpture," and Bahta has referred to it as "physical pirate radio." Chess is played "ambiently" at the parties in a style that can be likened to a contemporary form of Romantic chess.

=== Machine of Love & Grace ===
He released his sophomore LP, Machine of Love & Grace, on November 11, 2025. The listening experience took place at Silence Please on November 9, 2025. The album was described as a "hypermodern wall of sound that scores this contemporary moment with a timely yet timeless approach."

== Style and influences ==
He has cited Michael Jackson, Antonio Vivaldi, and Jimi Hendrix as formative musical influences." He has also cited Timbaland and the Dada art movement of the early 20th century as influences. The sound of his debut album has been described as "revisionist Motown mixed with Abbey Road." His sound has been described as "layered pop music" that "[synthesizes] traditional elements of pop songwriting with funk, jazz, electronic and experimental noise." He has noted "architectural attention to form" and "understanding humanity in this time of 'data'" as central questions in his practice. Much of his work is in conversation with historical thinking.

== Discography ==
Studio albums

- 21st Century Blue (2019)
- Machine of Love & Grace (2025)

Extended plays

- Beholden (2016)
- Your Happy Place (2017)
- "K0D / 43VR" (2023)
