= Zipper (song) =

2017 single by Brockhampton

Single by Brockhampton

from the album Saturation III
- Released: December 15, 2017
- Recorded: August–November 2017
- Genre: Alternative hip hop
- Length: 3:22
- Label: Question Everything; Empire
- Songwriter(s): Russell Boring; Dominique Simpson; Ian Simpson; Matthew Champion; William Wood
- Producer(s): Jabari Manwa; Romil Hemnani

Brockhampton singles chronology
"Stains" (2017)	"Zipper" / "Rental" (2017)	"1999 Wildfire" (2018)

Music video
- "Zipper" on YouTube

"Zipper" (stylized in all caps) is a song by American hip hop boy band Brockhampton, released on December 15, 2017, as a single from their third studio album Saturation III (2017). It contains a sample of "Cha Cha Cha!" by Optigan.

== Composition ==
The instrumental features a dusty western piano riff, which along with the first verse (performed by Joba) has been described as similar to rapper Eminem's early music style, and a police siren. In the song, members provide vocals in Auto-Tune, while Matt Champion performs in a "sleepy flow". Kevin Abstract performs the chorus. The song also shouts out to Anthony Fantano.

Will Rosebury of Clash commented the song "bounces with a sense of euphoria reminiscent of Stankonia-era OutKast."

== Critical reception ==
Owl Beanie of Sputnikmusic commented the song's vocals are "characteristically manipulated into textures that make you go: 'ok what is this I want more of it cheers.'" Veronica Irwin of The Quietus criticized the song, stating "the evil-clown rhythm of 'Zipper' coming off as some tacky and unwanted German polka after spending months waiting for more digestible hits along the lines of Saturation II's 'Sweet' and 'Gummy.'"
