= Gold (Brockhampton song) =

2017 single by Brockhampton

Single by Brockhampton

from the album Saturation
- Released: May 23, 2017
- Genre: Hip hop
- Length: 4:26
- Label: Question Everything; Empire
- Songwriters: Ian Simpson; Ameer Vann; William Wood; Matthew Champion; Dominique Simpson; Russell Boring
- Producers: Q3; Romil Hemnani

Brockhampton singles chronology
| "Heat" (2017) | "Gold" (2017) | "Star" (2017) |

Music video
- "Gold" on YouTube

"Gold" (stylized in all caps) is a song by American hip hop boy band Brockhampton and the third single from their debut studio album Saturation (2017). The music video premiered on May 23, 2017, before the song was released to streaming services on May 30, 2017.

== Composition and critical reception ==
Jay Balfour of Pitchfork wrote, "'GOLD' is a zany posse cut that casts each member as an endearing weirdo, rambling randomly in the cypher. The beat feels psychedelic and underwater, a woozy guitar line sliding around as a cowbell taps like a funky metronome. The verses are disjointed introductions: Abstract rattles off the hook, Dom Mclennan [sic] drop [sic] a Mean Girls reference ('We rock pink now on Wednesdays'), and Merlyn Wood swerves in a Honda and teases, 'That's so Merlyn, that's so Merlyn.' It sounds like a jumbled night out with friends, full of inside jokes and non sequiturs—less a statement of intent than lightning in a bottle." In a review of Saturation, Matthew Strauss of Pitchfork wrote the song "isn't about much, yet it is easily the project's most appealing and assertive outing. It features nearly all of the collective's vocalists, showcasing them one by one over a futuristic boogie of a beat. Founder Kevin Abstract delivers the hook, in which flaunting a gold chain is akin to godliness. Rappers Matt Champion, Ameer Vann, Merlyn Wood, and Dom McLennon follow suit, each one delivering his strongest flow on the album. 'GOLD' is the exemplar of BROCKHAMPTON's message of self-confidence, where effortless cool is a default setting."

Variety ranked "Gold" as the band's best song. Live365 placed it at number four in their list "Top 10 Brockhampton Songs".

== Music video ==
The music video was directed by Kevin Abstract. It shows Brockhampton hanging around in South Los Angeles and wearing costumes.

== Certifications ==
| Region | Certification | Certified units/sales |
|---|---|---|
| United States (RIAA) | Gold | 500,000^{‡} |
^{‡} Sales+streaming figures based on certification alone.
