= Swamp (Brockhampton song) =

2017 single by Brockhampton

Single by Brockhampton

from the album Saturation II
- Released: August 8, 2017
- Genre: Pop rap
- Length: 4:11
- Label: Question Everything; Empire
- Songwriters: Ian Simpson; Matthew Champion; Ameer Vann; William Wood; Dominique Simpson; Russell Boring
- Producer: Jabari Manwa

Brockhampton singles chronology
"Gummy" (2017)	"Swamp" (2017)	"Junky" (2017)

Music video
- "Swamp" on YouTube

"Swamp" (stylized in all caps) is a song by American hip hop boy band Brockhampton, released on August 8, 2017, as the second single from their second studio album Saturation II (2017).

== Composition ==
The production of the song includes "jazzy guitar runs", "synth squeals" that are similar in style to that of West Coast hip hop and gangsta rap, and a subdued sound of erhu. In the chorus, Kevin Abstract raps "fucking commas up from the outside", a reference to the song by Future. The verses focus on growing up in an environment of crime, following one's dreams, insecurity, and self-discovery.

== Critical reception ==
Lauren O'Neill of Vice wrote, "'Swamp' itself is yet another encapsulation of why Brockhampton sound like the future: a bunch of fresh, different verses from which it's difficult to choose the best, a poppy hook (I think almost immediately of N*SYNC and honestly I'm not mad at the comparison), and a mellow beat that demonstrates the group can take on pretty much any mood and make their sound suit it." In a review of Saturation II, Peter A. Berry of XXL praised the song and the album for the aspect that "you can hear believably rugged bars about 'turning grams into elbows' (Ameer Vann) on the same song as cheesy, but refreshingly earnest self-help lyrics like 'treat my heart like a treasure, 'cause no one else will' (Dom McLennon)."

== Music video ==
The music video was directed by Kevin Abstract and filmed in Van Nuys, Los Angeles. According to Abstract, it was inspired by Spike Jonze, 1990s Nickelodeon and the film Chronicle. It finds Brockhampton members wearing police uniforms, in a car with masking tape on their faces, and depicts police brutality. In other scenes, Merlyn Wood and a puppet are seen flying through the clouds, and the members hang out near four-foot Coca-Cola bottles. The video also features appearances from what resembles Sesame Street characters.
