= Bleach (song) =

2017 song by Brockhampton

Song by Brockhampton

from the album Saturation III
- Released: December 15, 2017
- Recorded: August–November 2017
- Genre: Hip hop; R&B
- Length: 4:33
- Label: Question Everything; Empire
- Songwriters: Ian Simpson; Matthew Champion; William Wood; Ameer Vann; Dominique Simpson; Russell Boring; Ryan Beatty; Ciarán McDonald
- Producers: Romil Hemnani; Jabari Manwa

"Bleach" (stylized in all caps) is a song by American hip hop boy band Brockhampton from their third studio album Saturation III (2017).

== Composition and lyrics ==
"Bleach" has been described as an "abstract R&B power ballad with an aching, heartsick climax". The production features a "woozy synth line" of G-funk-esque style, over which Matt Champion and Merlyn Wood perform their verses, before the beat switches to R&B style in the climax. The chorus is performed by Ryan Beatty. The bridge of the song sees a palm muted guitar riff, over which Joba provides "silky" falsetto vocals. The outro is performed by Bearface.

== Critical reception ==
The song was well received by music critics. Trevor Smith of HotNewHipHop remarked it "showcases the strong R&B sensibilities of the group". Veronica Irwin of The Quietus wrote "'Bleach' in particular, with it's [sic] fading, flattening instrumental is stunning, and Beaty's hook, despite all its vagueness about 'the feeling,' has a chest-driven delivery that's absolutely heart wrenching." Marcus Blackwell of HipHopDX considered it one of the songs from Saturation III that "effectively highlight a recurring major strength for the collective: relatability." HotNewHipHop's Patrick Lyons commented the closing minute of the song "feels effortless in contrast with about half of III that feels more calculated than anything from Brockhampton's past." Clash's Will Rosebury cited it as among the tracks that "allow each member to express themselves more candidly, without verging on the over-sentimentality of tracks from the first two records."

Live365 ranked it as their third best song. Variety placed "Bleach" at number six on their list of Brockhampton's 15 best songs.

== Charts ==
Chart (2017)	Peak position
New Zealand Heatseekers (RMNZ)	8

== Certifications ==
Region	Certification	Certified units/sales
United States (RIAA)	Gold	500,000^{‡}
^{‡} Sales+streaming figures based on certification alone.
