= Junky (song) =

2017 single by Brockhampton

Single by Brockhampton

from the album Saturation II
- Released: August 15, 2017
- Genre: Conscious hip hop; hardcore hip hop
- Length: 4:08
- Label: Question Everything; Empire
- Songwriter(s): Ian Simpson; Ameer Vann; William Wood; Russell Boring; Matthew Champion; Dominique Simpson
- Producer(s): Romil Hemnani; Q3; Joba

Brockhampton singles chronology
"Swamp" (2017)	"Junky" (2017)	"Sweet" (2017)

Music video
- "Junky" on YouTube

"Junky" (stylized in all caps) is a song by American hip hop boy band Brockhampton, released on August 15, 2017 as the third single from their second studio album Saturation II (2017).

== Composition and lyrics ==
The production of the song contains erhu, while the lyrics revolve around the personal and social challenges that each member has faced. In the opening verse, Kevin Abstract raps about his homosexuality and its surrounding challenges ("'Why you always rap about being gay?' / 'Cause not enough niggas rap and be gay"). This is followed by a "piercing cacophony of solemn piano chords and tire screeches". Ameer Vann discusses his paranoia and drug addiction in the next verse, after which Merlyn Wood raps about his family pressuring him to pursue a career outside of music. Matt Champion performs the penultimate verse, in which he addresses sexism, male entitlement and rape culture.

== Critical reception ==
Matthew Strauss of Pitchfork called Kevin Abstract's verse "ferocious" and wrote "even when his bandmates rap with less objective gravity, the coiled beats makes them feel just as important." Peter A. Berry of XXL described Matt Champion's verse as "accurate, but misplaced" and deemed it irrelevant to the similar themes of the other verses.

Live365 ranked it as their second best song. Variety placed "Junky" at number 14 on their list of Brockhampton's 15 best songs.

== Music video ==
The music video was directed by Kevin Abstract and filmed in Los Angeles. It shows the members of Brockhampton "spazzing out" in front of the camera, as well as frightening shots of four people wearing dresses that are soaked in blood and a person wearing an alien-looking baby mask and holding a butcher's knife in the back seat of a car.
