= Heat (Brockhampton song) =

2017 single by Brockhampton

Single by Brockhampton

from the album Saturation
- Released: May 18, 2017
- Genre: Hardcore hip hop
- Length: 4:32
- Label: Question Everything; Empire
- Songwriters: Ameer Vann; William Wood; Dominique Simpson; Russell Boring; Matthew Champion; Ian Simpson
- Producer: Romil Hemnani

Brockhampton singles chronology
"Face" (2017)	"Heat" (2017)	"Gold" (2017)

Music video
- "Heat" on YouTube

"Heat" (stylized in all caps) is a song by American hip hop boy band Brockhampton, and the second single from their debut studio album Saturation (2017). The music video premiered on May 16, 2017, before the song was released to streaming services on May 18, 2017.

== Critical reception ==
Matthew Strauss of Pitchfork commented that the song, "with its blown-out bass and frantic vocals, explodes with id—a moment of catharsis for both the rappers and the listener. McLennon's 'I hate the way I think, I hate the way it looms' sounds more proud than afraid."

Live365 placed "Heat" at number eight on their list "Top 10 Brockhampton Songs". Variety ranked it as the band's fifth best song.

== Music video ==
The music video was directed by Kevin Abstract and filmed in a neighborhood in South Los Angeles, with a single camera that has been described as "old school-esque filtered". In the clip, different members of Brockhampton take turns rapping their verses before the camera, and they are also seen dancing in the background.
