= Face (song) =

2017 single by Brockhampton

Single by Brockhampton

from the album Saturation
- Released: May 6, 2017
- Genre: Alternative R&B; pop rap
- Length: 4:19
- Label: Question Everything; Empire
- Songwriters: Ameer Vann; Russell Boring; Dominique Simpson; Matthew Champion
- Producer: Kiko Merley

Brockhampton singles chronology
"Cannon" (2017)	"Face" (2017)	"Heat" (2017)

Music video
- "Face" on YouTube

"Face" (stylized in all caps) is a song by American hip hop boy band Brockhampton and the lead single from their debut studio album Saturation (2017). The music video premiered on May 6, 2017, before the song was released to streaming services on May 18, 2017.

== Composition and critical reception ==
Joe Price of Complex gave a positive review of the song, writing "The Kiko-handeled [sic] production is minimal but hypnotic, providing plenty of space for each of the vocalists. Joba, who handles the hook of the song, shines in particular atop the serene instrumental, which twinkles and stutters. Dom McLennon, Ameer Vann, and Matt Champion all make brilliant contributions to the song, too." Matthew Strauss of Pitchfork wrote in a review of Saturation, "No member is a particularly good rapper, but they make up for their weakness when they ride the pristine beats with exuberance. 'FACE,' for example, is so clean that a clunker like Champion's 'New times are coming just like a virgin' easily skates by unnoticed amid Vann and McLennon's superior verses and JOBA's gentle hook."

Variety ranked "Face" at number 12 on their list of Brockhampton's 15 best songs.

== Music video ==
The music video was directed by Kevin Abstract and shot by Ashlan Grey. It sees the members of Brockhampton lying down and trashing the front of their house.

== Certifications ==
Region	Certification	Certified units/sales
United States (RIAA)	Gold	500,000^{‡}
^{‡} Sales+streaming figures based on certification alone.
