= Gummy (song) =

2017 single by Brockhampton

Single by Brockhampton

from the album Saturation II
- Released: August 2, 2017
- Genre: Hip hop
- Length: 4:21
- Label: Question Everything; Empire
- Songwriter(s): Ian Simpson; William Wood; Ameer Vann; Dominique Simpson; Matthew Champion; Russell Boring
- Producer(s): Romil Hemnani; Q3; Joba

Brockhampton singles chronology
"Fake" (2017)	"Gummy" (2017)	"Swamp" (2017)

Music video
- "Gummy" on YouTube

"Gummy" (stylized in all caps) is a song by American hip hop boy band Brockhampton and the lead single from their second studio album Saturation II (2017). The music video premiered on August 1, 2017, before the song was released to streaming services on August 2.

== Composition ==
The instrumental of the song has been described as infusing elements of West Coast hip hop and Middle Eastern music. It starts with a strings section that is stopped by the sound of a buzzer, followed by a "moaning oboe dirge", and features "eerie portamento synths" that provide a G-funk sound. Lyrically, the song is about valuing friendship over wealth and materialism. In the opening verse, Kevin Abstract mocks his critics who perceive him as "sappy". Abstract also performs the chorus, on which he revealed on Twitter that he was trying to imitate British rapper M.I.A. In another verse, Dom McLennon raps about "personal and societal realities".

== Critical reception ==
Sheldon Pearce of Pitchfork gave a positive review of the song, writing "The business-by-committee approach is effective here as they stack sidewinding, mismatched rap verses on top of each other." The song was also included on Pitchfork's list "Top 100 Songs of 2017" and Consequence of Sound's list "Top 50 Songs of 2017".

Live365 placed it at number seven in their list "Top 10 Brockhampton Songs".

== Music video ==
The music video was directed by Kevin Abstract. It sees Brockhampton cruising through Van Nuys, Los Angeles after having committed a bank robbery, as each member pops their head up from the sunroof and raps their verses. During Abstract's verse, his head is also shown floating and appearing above a couch. The visual features subtitles which recount the events of the heist, and an appearance from an alpaca called Mr. Snuggleupagus.
