= Star (Brockhampton song) =

2017 single by Brockhampton

Single by Brockhampton

from the album Saturation
- Released: May 30, 2017
- Genre: Hip hop
- Length: 2:41
- Label: Question Everything; Empire
- Songwriter(s): Ian Simpson; Ameer Vann; Dominique Simpson
- Producer(s): Jabari Manwa

Brockhampton singles chronology
"Gold" (2017)	"Star" (2017)	"Boys" (2017)

Music video
- "Star" on YouTube

"Star" (stylized in all caps) is a song by American hip hop boy band Brockhampton and the fourth single from their debut studio album Saturation (2017).

== Composition ==
The song features members Dom McLennon, Ameer Vann and Kevin Abstract, each of whom perform a verse. It finds them name-dropping numerous celebrities as well as using pop culture references.

== Critical reception ==
The Fader included the song on their list "The 101 best songs of 2017". Live365 ranked "Star" as the best song by Brockhampton, while Variety ranked it as the band's second best.

== Music video ==
The music video was directed by Kevin Abstract and premiered on May 30, 2017. It shows Brockhampton with blue skin and riding in a golf cart around South Los Angeles. The video ends with a preview of another song by the band.
