= J'ouvert (song) =

2018 single by Brockhampton

Single by Brockhampton

from the album Iridescence
- Released: September 20, 2018
- Recorded: June–September 2018
- Genre: Alternative hip hop; industrial hip hop
- Length: 3:54
- Label: Question Everything; RCA
- Songwriters: Matthew Champion; William Wood; Russell Boring; Ciarán McDonald; Jabari Manwarring; Romil Hemnani; James Charles; Marcus James
- Producers: Jabari Manwa; Hemnani; Joba

Brockhampton singles chronology
"1997 Diana" (2018)	"J'ouvert" (2018)	"San Marcos" (2018)

Music video
- "J'ouvert" on YouTube

"J'ouvert" (stylized in all caps) is a song by American hip hop boy band Brockhampton, released on September 20, 2018 as the lead single from their fourth studio album Iridescence, which was released a day later. It contains a sample of "Doh Blame Me" by Lavaman.

== Composition ==
The song's production uses "distorted bass pounds, robotic squeaks, and horn wails", as well as "buzzing kicks and distorted, 8-bit synths". It features verses from Matt Champion, Joba, Merlyn Wood and Bearface,and has been described as "angsty", especially regarding Joba's verse, which music critics have also described as his most "ferocious" verse, "apoplectic Danny Brown-style psychopath", and "emotively deranged". In his verse, Joba raps about his mental health issues and drug use. Following this, the instrumental breaks into the "Doh Blame Me" sample.

== Critical reception ==
The song received generally positive reviews, with particular praise for Joba's performance. In a review of Iridescence, Sputnikmusic's Rowan5215 wrote favorably of Joba's diversity in music, mentioning the performance of his verse. Will Rosebury of Clash regarded the verse to be a particular highlight of the album, "calling to mind Eminem at peak disturbing on 'Kim'". Daniel Spielberger of HipHopDX criticized the song, calling it a "muddled mess that has an off-putting verse from Joba."

Variety placed "J'ouvert" at number 15 in their ranking of Brockhampton's 15 best songs.

== Music video ==
The music video was directed by Spencer Ford and shot in London. It features thermal imaging, and was filmed both in color and black-and-white.

== Charts ==
Chart (2018)	Peak position
Ireland (IRMA)	92
New Zealand Hot Singles (RMNZ)	10
