= Saturation III =

Studio album by Brockhampton
- Released: December 15, 2017
- Recorded: August–November 2017
- Studios: Brockhampton Factory, Van Nuys, California
- Genres: Alternative rap; industrial rap; experimental; alternative R&B; West Coast Hip Hop; Hardcore Hip Hop
- Length: 46:17
- Labels: Question Everything; Empire
- Producers: Brockhampton: (Kevin Abstract; Romil Hemnani; Joba; Bearface; Q3 (Jabari Manwa and Kiko Merley))

Brockhampton chronology
Saturation II (2017)	Saturation III (2017)	Iridescence (2018)

Singles from Saturation III
- 1. "Boogie" Released: December 12, 2017; 2. "Stains" Released: December 14, 2017; 3. "Rental" Released: December 15, 2017; 4. "Zipper" Released: December 15, 2017

Saturation III (stylized in all caps) is the third studio album by American hip hop boy band Brockhampton, released on December 15, 2017. Production is predominantly handled by Romil Hemnani, alongside production duo Q3 (composed of Jabari Manwa and Kiko Merley), as with previous releases. It concludes the Saturation trilogy, commenced with Saturation and followed with Saturation II. Originally promoted as the group's "final studio album", the group announced their fourth album, titled Team Effort at the time before being scrapped, a day before Saturation III was released. Saturation III is the band's last album with founding member Ameer Vann, who left the band in May 2018 amid accusations of sexual misconduct. The album contains an uncredited guest appearance from American singer Ryan Beatty.

== Background ==
To promote Saturation II, Brockhampton released a single from the album for every week of August along with accompanying music videos. The night that "Sweet", the final single from Saturation II was released, the music video for the song "Follow" was posted, along with the announcement that Saturation III would be released before the end of 2017. However, "Follow" was later revealed to not be included on Saturation III, but rather with the Saturation box set along with other musical demos.

In October, it was revealed that Saturation III was scheduled to be released in December. On December 1, the release date for the album was announced, along with the statement that it would be the last studio album by the group. This statement ended up being false, as what was to be their fourth studio album, Team Effort, was announced later that month. On December 6, the track listing and cover for the album were revealed. Keeping in line with the previous Saturation albums, the cover featured vocalist Ameer Vann, however every preceding day alternate covers featuring other members of the collective were revealed. On December 13, 2017, the short film Billy Star was released, directed by Kevin Abstract and starring multiple members of Brockhampton. The short film included snippets of the songs "Bleach", "Nation", and "Team" (titled "Evanie" in the film) from Saturation III.

== Singles ==
On December 12, 2017, the first song from the album, "Boogie", was released as a single along with an accompanying music video. The song "Stains" was revealed on Apple Music's Beats1 radio station on December 14, 2017. Both tracks were produced by Romil Hemnani and Jabari Manwa.

== Critical reception ==
Professional ratings
Aggregate scores
Source	Rating
Metacritic	82/100
Review scores
Source	Rating
AllMusic	3.5/5 stars
The A.V. Club	B
Clash	9/10
Consequence of Sound	B+
HipHopDX	4/5 stars
HotNewHipHop	75%
Pitchfork	7.5/10
The 405	8/10

Saturation III has received widespread acclaim from critics, with many citing it as the strongest in the Saturation trilogy. At Metacritic, which assigns a normalized rating out of 100 to reviews from mainstream publications, the album has an average score of 82 based on 10 reviews, indicating "universal acclaim". For The Boston Globe, Isaac Feldberg praised "the sense that Brockhampton’s creative energies thrive most when every member’s strengths, and stories, are being utilized", stating that the album "is entirely of a piece with its two predecessors; the disc exudes confidence on every front, though the group’s ambitions seem scaled up to world domination."

HipHopDX's Marcus Blackwell described the album as "their strongest project yet", with Timothy Michalik of The 405 also describing it as "their smartest album to date", concluding that "this run of SATURATION albums have turned out to be among 2017’s finest musical achievements". He also said that the album is "the ultimate victory lap for a group who have stayed busier in the studio than some artists do in their entire career." For Pitchfork, Sheldon Pearce wrote that "it's on their third album of the year that rap crew BROCKHAMPTON's whole gestalt comes into focus", praising the album's "memorable performances" and the "fascinatingly unorthodox compositions servicing them."

Veronica Irwin for The Quietus described the album as "their most abstract, their most experimental, and by far their weirdest", stating that "at first listen it's incredibly off putting", but concluded that "in the span of their 3-album-in-a-year discography it fills the hole where something totally new and experimental needed to be."

For HotNewHipHop, Patrick Lyons praised the album's "beat change-ups and multi-genre excursions," however criticised the group's "thematic repetition and loss of stylistic grounding", concluding that "this trilogy is good-to-great, but I think its lasting legacy could be that of a breeding ground for solo stars who are still finding their own footing." Clayton Purdom of The A.V. Club wrote that "like its predecessors, the album is hit or miss, but the batting average remains uncommonly high for a project like this", concluding that "if it seems like there’s nothing these guys can’t do, it’s because there's nothing they're not willing to try." Reviewing the album for AllMusic, Neil Z. Yeung stated that the album "entertains as much as its two predecessors" and called the Saturation trilogy overall "a fun, thoughtful, and unexpected experience from a group of highly creative young musicians."

=== Year-end rankings ===
Year-end rankings for Saturation III
Publication	List	Rank	Ref.
BrooklynVegan	BrooklynVegan's Top 50 Albums of 2017	12	
Pigeons & Planes	Best Albums of 2017	4	

== Commercial performance ==
Saturation III debuted at number 15 on the Billboard 200 with 36,418 album-equivalent units, of which 24,935 were pure sales.

== Track listing ==
Saturation III track listing
No.	Title	Writer(s)	Producer(s)	Length
1.	"Boogie"	Ian Simpson; Ameer Vann; Matt Champion; Russell Boring; William Wood; Dominique Simpson	Romil Hemnani; Jabari Manwa^{[b]}	3:13
2.	"Zipper"	Boring; D. Simpson; I. Simpson; Champion; Wood	Manwa; Hemnani^{[a]}	3:22
3.	"Johnny"	I. Simpson; D. Simpson; Vann; Champion; Boring	Hemnani; Manwa^{[b]}; Kiko Merley^{[c]}	4:11
4.	"Liquid"	Vann; D. Simpson; I. Simpson; Wood; Champion	Manwa	1:22
5.	"Cinema 1"	I. Simpson; Robert Ontenient	Hemnani	0:45
6.	"Stupid"	Wood; Vann; Champion; I. Simpson; D. Simpson	Hemnani; Q3 (Manwa; Kiko Merley)	3:36
7.	"Bleach"	I. Simpson; Champion; Wood; Vann; D. Simpson; Boring; Ryan Beatty; Ciarán McDonald	Hemnani; Manwa	4:33
8.	"Alaska"	Vann; I. Simpson; Boring; Champion	Hemnani; Bearface^{[b]}	3:19
9.	"Hottie"	I. Simpson; D. Simpson; Boring; Wood; Champion	Manwa	3:17
10.	"Cinema 2"	I. Simpson; Ontenient	Hemnani	0:38
11.	"Sister/Nation"	Wood; Boring; I. Simpson; Champion; D. Simpson; I. Simpson; Vann; D. Simpson; Wood	Hemnani	6:04
12.	"Rental"	I. Simpson; D. Simpson; Champion	Hemnani; Q3	3:33
13.	"Stains"	Vann; Ashlan Grey; Champion; D. Simpson; Boring	Hemnani; Manwa	3:00
14.	"Cinema 3"	I. Simpson; Ontenient	Hemnani	0:51
15.	"Team"	McDonald; I. Simpson; Vann; D. Simpson; Champion	Bearface; Hemnani^{[b]}; Joba^{[b]}	4:33
Total length:				46:17

Notes

- ^{^[a]} signifies a co-producer.
- ^{^[b]} signifies an additional producer.
- ^{^[c]} signifies an additional drum programmer.
- All tracks stylized in all caps. For example, "Boogie" is stylized as "BOOGIE".
- "Zipper" contains a sample of "Cha Cha Cha!" by Optigan
- "Hottie" contains a sample of "KissKiss" by Parov Stela
- "Johnny" contains a sample of "Navi 'Listen'" by Kaori Mizuhashi
- "Alaska" contains a sample of "Ignorant" by Whipped Cream
- "Team" contains a sample of "Heat" by Brockhampton, which itself samples "Flowing Like a Snake in Ophiuchus' Arms" by Clap! Clap!

== Personnel ==
Brockhampton

- Kevin Abstract – performance (tracks 1–4, 6–9, 11, 12, 15), executive production, creative direction
- Matt Champion – performance (tracks 1–4, 6–9, 11–13, 15), additional vocals (track 4)
- Joba – performance (tracks 1–4, 6–9, 11, 13), additional production (track 15), vocals (track 13), additional vocals (tracks 4, 6, 12, 15), co-executive production, mixing, mastering
- Ameer Vann – performance (tracks 1, 3, 4, 6–8, 11, 13, 15)
- Dom McLennon – performance (tracks 1–4, 6, 7, 9, 11–13, 15)
- Merlyn Wood – performance (tracks 1, 2, 4, 6, 7, 9, 11)
- Bearface – performance (tracks 7, 15), production (track 15), additional production (track 8)
- Romil Hemnani – production (tracks 1, 3, 5–8, 10–14), co-production (track 2), additional production (track 15), co-executive production, recording engineering
- Q3 – production (tracks 6, 12)
  - Jabari Manwa – production (tracks 2, 4, 7, 9, 13), additional production (tracks 1, 3)
  - Kiko Merley – additional drum programming (track 3)
- Henock "HK" Sileshi – creative direction, graphic design
- Ashlan Grey – photography, performance (track 13)
- Robert Ontenient – webmastering, performance (tracks 5, 10, 11, 14)

Additional personnel

- Ryan Beatty – performance (track 7)
- Nick Lenzini – creative assistance
- Kevin Doan – creative assistance

== Charts ==
Chart performance for Saturation III
Chart (2018)	Peak position
Canadian Albums (Billboard)	59
New Zealand Heatseeker Albums (RMNZ)	1
US Billboard 200	15
US Top R&B/Hip-Hop Albums (Billboard)	5
