= Rental (song) =

2017 single by Brockhampton

Single by Brockhampton

from the album Saturation III
- Released: December 15, 2017
- Recorded: August–November 2017
- Genre: Alternative R&B; pop rap
- Length: 3:33
- Label: Question Everything; Empire
- Songwriter(s): Ian Simpson; Dominique Simpson; Matthew Champion
- Producer(s): Romil Hemnani; Q3

Brockhampton singles chronology
"Stains" (2017)	"Rental" / "Zipper" (2017)	"1999 Wildfire" (2018)

Music video
- "Rental" on YouTube

"Rental" (stylized in all caps) is a song by American hip hop boy band Brockhampton, released on December 15, 2017, as a single from their third studio album Saturation III (2017).

== Composition ==
"Rental" is a pop-oriented song that features melodic performances from Kevin Abstract, Dom McLennon and Matt Champion, with synthesizers and 808s in the instrumental, which also has a recurring beeping during the chorus.

== Critical reception ==
Veronica Irwin of The Quietus commented the song "deserves recognition for the contrast between melodic fuzzy synths and crisp tapping 808s". In a review of Saturation III, Hypebeast wrote the song "has the best deployment of autotune on the album, especially on Mclennon's verse."

Variety placed "Rental" at number ten on their list of Brockhampton's 15 best songs.

== Music video ==
The music video was directed by Kevin Abstract and filmed in Brooklyn, New York. It opens with Robert Ontenient in a bathtub eating a banana and announcing the end of the Saturation trilogy, and sees Brockhampton members hanging around in various locations.
