= Mika's Laundry =

Studio album by Matt Champion
- Released: March 22, 2024
- Length: 33:07
- Label: RCA
- Producer: Matt Champion; Henry Kwapis; Dijon; Jack Karaszewski; Jabari Manwa; Ryan Raines

Matt Champion chronology
Harley (2017)	Mika's Laundry (2024)	Slint's Favorite (2024)

Singles from Mika's Laundry
- 1. "Aphid" Released: February 15, 2024; 2. "Slug" Released: February 28, 2024; 3. "Slow Motion" Released: March 8, 2024

Mika's Laundry is the debut studio album by rapper and former Brockhampton member Matt Champion, released on March 22, 2024, by RCA Records. The album was preceded by three singles, all with music videos directed by Anna Pollack. It features contributions from Henry Kwapis, Dijon, Dora Jar, Jennie, and multiple of Champion's former bandmates.

== Background and release ==
Champion is the second former member of Brockhampton to release a solo album since the group's breakup in 2022, following Kevin Abstract's 2023 album Blanket.

Champion released the album's first single, "Aphid", on February 15, 2024. The single features vocals by Dijon. Clash's Robin Murray said "the touching songwriting brims with promise, Matt Champion illuminating each finer detail in the process." The song came with a music video directed by Anna Pollack. Second single "Slug" followed on February 28, co-produced by Champion and Henry Kwapis. "Slug" expands on the sound of "Aphid", "channeling gooey, nostalgia-inducing funk and soul." "Slug" came with a music video directed by Pollack in which Champion, covered in slime, dances and crawls around in a plastic bubble in the woods.

The album was announced on March 8, with its release set for March 22 by RCA Records. With the announcement came the third single, "Slow Motion", featuring Jennie from the K-pop group Blackpink. Stereogum's Tom Breihan called the song a "starry-eyed love song" which "starts off as a soft, Billie Eilish-style piano ballad, but then a jungle breakbeat kicks in so suddenly that I thought I had music playing in a different open tab." The song came with another video directed by Pollack. Jennie revealed on Instagram that the two made the song three years prior. A music video for "Dogfish", also directed by Pollack, was released the same day as the album.

Champion described the album as existing in "a remote, but technologically sound community of cement-walled facilities, open plains, and greenhouse-like domes, at the centre of which lies the album's namesake club, Mika's Laundry." He credited Arthur Russell's Love Is Overtaking Me, Tirzah's Devotion, and Big Moe's City of Syrup as inspiring his melodic literacy.

== Reception ==
Mika's Laundry ratings
Review scores
Source	Rating
The Needle Drop	6/10

Hypebeast's Elaina Bernstein called the album "existential and ethereal" and said it "reflects the many different sides of Champion, while also infusing the influences of the project's production collaborators". Clash's Robin Murray said the album is "framed by vivid colour" and is a "work of real complexity, dominated by shifts in mood and tone." The Needle Drop's Anthony Fantano wrote that while the album's "song structures leave a lot to be desired, Mika's Laundry is a pretty good showcase of Matt's range as a solo artist."

Paste ranked "Slug" as the 41st-best song of the first half of 2024, with Matt Mitchell praising it as "one of the best dance tracks of the year, one I haven't been able to turn off since I first heard it months ago." Uproxx called the album one of the best of the year as of June 4.

== Track listing ==
All tracks are written by Matt Champion and Henry Kwapis with others noted. All tracks are produced by Champion and Kwapis with others noted.

Mika's Laundry track listing
No.	Title	Writer(s)	Producers	Length
1.	"Green"			3:02
2.	"Aphid" (featuring Dijon)	Dijon Duenas; Ciarán McDonald; Lily Lizotte		2:45
3.	"Steel" (featuring Dora Jar)	Jack Karaszewski; Dora Jarkowski	Karaszewski	2:43
4.	"Gbiv"	Duenas; Isaiah Merriweather; Jack Sobo	Dijon (Note: Additional studio producer); Sobo; Kiko Merley	2:54
5.	"Purify"	Duenas; Merriweather; Mason Stoops	Merley; Stoops	3:01
6.	"Dogfish"		Ryan Richter	1:54
7.	"Code Red"	Duenas; Jabari Manwarring; Nate Cassel	Jabari Manwa; Cassel	2:12
8.	"Aren't You Excited"	Duenas; Merriweather	Dijon; Merley	2:22
9.	"Slug"			3:00
10.	"Everybody Likes You"	Duenas		2:09
11.	"Project"	Adam Melchor	Melchor	1:59
12.	"Slow Motion" (with Jennie)	Duenas; Jennie; Adam Feeney; Jacob Reske; Romil Hemnani	Dijon; Karaszewski; Merley	2:45
13.	"Meetin' You"	Ryan Raines	Raines	2:21
Total length:				33:07

== Personnel ==
=== Musicians ===
- Matt Champion – lead vocals
- Dijon – lead vocals (2), backing vocals (5, 7, 8)
- Dora Jar – lead vocals (3)
- Jennie – lead vocals (12)
- Ciarán McDonald – backing vocals (2)

=== Technical ===
- Henry Kwapis – recording engineer
- De'Ron Billups – recording engineer (2, 9)
- Adam Loeffler – recording engineer (12)
- Chris Galland – engineer
- Jeremie Inhaber, Robin Florent, and Scott Desmarais – assistant engineers
- Manny Marroquin – mixing engineer
- Zach Pereyra – mastering engineer
