= Iridescence (album) =

iridescence

Studio album by Brockhampton
- Released: September 21, 2018
- Recorded: June–September 2018
- Studios: Abbey Road, London; The BH Factory, Hawaii
- Genres: Industrial hip-hop; experimental; hip-hop; progressive rap
- Length: 48:50
- Labels: Question Everything; RCA
- Producers: Brockhampton: (Kevin Abstract; Romil Hemnani; Jabari Manwa; Russell "Joba" Boring; Bearface; Kiko Merley; Dom McLennon)

Brockhampton chronology
Saturation III (2017)	iridescence (2018)	Ginger (2019)

Singles from Iridescence
- 1. "J'ouvert" Released: September 20, 2018; 2. "San Marcos" Released: 2018; 3. "New Orleans" Released: 2018

Iridescence (stylized in all lowercase) is the fourth studio album and major-label debut by American hip-hop boy band Brockhampton, released on September 21, 2018, by Question Everything, Inc. and RCA Records. The self-produced album was recorded at Abbey Road Studios in London, as well as the group's own studio in Hawaii. It is their first album since founding member Ameer Vann's departure from the group following sexual misconduct allegations. It debuted at number one on the US Billboard 200 albums chart, becoming the group's only chart-topping album. The album contains uncredited guest appearances from Jaden Smith, Serpentwithfeet, and the London Community Gospel Choir.

== Background ==
On December 14, 2017, Brockhampton announced their fourth studio album, Team Effort, slated for release in 2018, but in March 2018, they announced that Team Effort had been delayed. On March 20, Kevin Abstract and other members posted a "work-in-progress" album cover of "PUPPY", scrapping the name "Team Effort" completely. "PUPPY" was set to be released some time in June. The next week, they announced via social media that they had signed a record deal with Sony's RCA Records in a deal reportedly worth $15 million for six albums over three years. PUPPY was also delayed (revealed on Kevin Abstract's Instagram Live) following allegations of sexual misconduct against founding member Ameer Vann. On May 27, Brockhampton announced via Twitter that Vann would no longer be a part of the group, and cancelled the remainder of their tour dates to regroup.

Following Vann's departure, on June 20, the band made their late-night television debut when they appeared on The Tonight Show Starring Jimmy Fallon performing a new song "Tonya", accompanied by guest vocalists Jazmine Sullivan, Ryan Beatty and Serpentwithfeet, as well as revealing the new title of their upcoming album, The Best Years of Our Lives. The next month the group announced a Beats 1 radio show Things We Lost in the Fire Radio, where they debuted a trilogy of singles, "1999 Wildfire", "1998 Truman" and "1997 Diana", released throughout July 2018. The album was recorded over 10 days at Abbey Road Studios in 2018, with further recording taking place at the Brockhampton Factory in Hawaii.

== Release and promotion ==
On August 26, Kevin Abstract made a post on Instagram announcing the album's title and that it would come to be released in September, and later announced dates for their new "i'll be there" tour. On September 10, they released new "iridescence" merchandise on their website. The next day, they announced a documentary titled The Longest Summer In America set to be released in selected theaters on September 20.

The group then released the track listing and artwork for the album. A video for "J'ouvert" was released the day before the album's release and features shots of the members and other environments filmed on a thermal camera. The videos for "San Marcos" and "New Orleans" were released on the September 25 and 27, respectively. They were filmed during a tour of Australia, with "San Marcos" shot outside of a Hungry Jack's in Melbourne and "New Orleans" shot inside an Event Cinemas complex in Sydney.

The North American/Australian tour, "i'll be there" featuring 37 shows was going on from iridescence's release date up until December. On October 23, the band returned to Jimmy Fallon performing "District".

== Critical reception ==
Professional ratings
Aggregate scores
Source	Rating
AnyDecentMusic?	8.0/10
Metacritic	85/100
Review scores
Source	Rating
AllMusic	4/5 stars
The Austin Chronicle	4/5 stars
The A.V. Club	B
Clash	8/10
Consequence of Sound	A−
DIY	5/5 stars
HipHopDX	4.1/5
The Line of Best Fit	9/10
NME	4/5 stars
Pitchfork	6.6/10

Iridescence received critical acclaim. At Metacritic, which assigns a normalized rating out of 100 to reviews from mainstream publications, Iridescence received an average score of 85, based on 11 reviews, indicating "universal acclaim". DIY gave the album a perfect score, with critic Will Richards writing, "Brockhampton have found a new sense of unity, and when Iridescence confronts every single one of these bumps, it proves that the band possess a truly special voice." Wren Graves of Consequence of Sound wrote, "Iridescence is full-to-bursting; it's like almost eating too much food, almost drinking too much booze; it's getting close to too much, and still asking for more."

Sputnikmusic opined that "Iridescence is the best Brockhampton album because it doesn't give a fuck what you think a Brockhampton album should sound like." NME's El Hunt wrote, "Far from making vague allusions to the events prior to Iridescence, Brockhampton lay them bare, atop some of their most adventurous work to date." The Line of Best Fit critic Sam Higgins stated that "the more you listen, the more intricacies you notice. The more you listen, the more you realise just how defining this record will be for the future of Brockhampton." In his review for AllMusic, Neil Z. Yeung stated, "Brockhampton absorbs what they need from across genres, sharing honest confessions from their varied personal backgrounds (the most striking provided by group leader Kevin Abstract) and reflecting its mixed audience as a voice of their generation. Brockhampton have seized upon this defining moment with Iridescence, a defining peak in their young career."

== Commercial performance ==
Iridescence debuted at number one on the US Billboard 200 dated October 6, 2018, with 101,000 album-equivalent units (including 79,000 pure album sales). It is the group's first number-one album. It fell to No. 88 in the next week's Billboard 200 chart and was not in the Billboard 200 chart dating to October 20, 2018.

== Track listing ==
Credits adapted from Brockhampton's official website.

Iridescence track listing
No.	Title	Writer(s)	Producer(s)	Length
1.	"New Orleans"	Dominique Simpson; Ian Simpson; Ciarán McDonald; Matthew Champion; Russell Boring; William Wood; Romil Hemnani; Jabari Manwarring	Hemnani; Russell "Joba" Boring; Jabari Manwa; Bearface	4:03
2.	"Thug Life"	I. Simpson; McDonald; D. Simpson; Hemnani; Boring; Manwarring	Hemnani; Joba; Bearface; Manwa	2:03
3.	"Berlin"	McDonald; D. Simpson; Champion; I. Simpson; Boring; Hemnani; Manwarring	Hemnani; Joba; Manwa; Dom McLennon; Kevin Abstract; Bearface	3:20
4.	"Something About Him"	I. Simpson; Isaiah Merriweather; Hemnani; Manwarring	Kiko Merley; Hemnani; Manwa	1:33
5.	"Where the Cash At"	Wood; Champion; Manwarring; Hemnani; Boring; I. Simpson	Manwa; Hemnani; Joba; Abstract	1:55
6.	"Weight"	I. Simpson; Boring; D. Simpson; Hemnani; Manwarring	Hemnani; Abstract; Joba; Manwa	4:20
7.	"District"	I. Simpson; Wood; Boring; McDonald; D. Simpson; Champion; Hemnani; Manwarring	Hemnani; Joba; Bearface; Manwa	3:32
8.	"Loophole"	Hemnani	Hemnani	0:53
9.	"Tape"	I. Simpson; Boring; Champion; D. Simpson; Hemnani	Hemnani; Joba	3:30
10.	"J'ouvert"	Champion; Wood; Boring; McDonald; Manwarring; Hemnani; James Charles^{[a]}; Marcus James^{[a]}	Manwa; Hemnani; Joba	3:54
11.	"Honey"	I. Simpson; Wood; D. Simpson; Champion; Hemnani; Manwarring; Merriweather; Beyoncé Knowles^{[b]}; Christopher Stewart^{[b]}; Terius Nash^{[b]}	Hemnani; Abstract; Manwa; Merley	3:15
12.	"Vivid"	Champion; D. Simpson; McDonald; I. Simpson; Merriweather; Hemnani; Manwarring	Merley; Hemnani; Manwa; Bearface	2:24
13.	"San Marcos"	Champion; I. Simpson; McDonald; D. Simpson; Boring; Hemnani; Merriweather; Manwarring	Bearface; Hemnani; Merley; Abstract; Joba; Manwa	4:47
14.	"Tonya"	McDonald; I. Simpson; Boring; D. Simpson; Wood; Hemnani; Manwarring; Josiah Wise	Hemnani; Joba; McLennon; Manwa; Bearface	4:43
15.	"Fabric"	I. Simpson; D. Simpson; Wood; Boring; McDonald; Hemnani; Manwarring	Hemnani; Abstract; Manwa; McLennon	4:38
Total length:				48:50

Notes

- All track titles stylized in all caps.
- "New Orleans" features vocals by Jaden Smith.
- "Thug Life" and "San Marcos" feature vocals by London Community Gospel Choir Children featuring St. Ann's.
- "Tonya" features vocals by Serpentwithfeet.
- "Honey" features additional vocals by Kirsty Hopkins.

Samples

- "Loophole" features a clip from Shade 45 featuring DJ Whoo Kid and Cam'ron.
- "Tape" contains an interpolation of "Videotape" by Radiohead.
- ^{^[a]} "J'ouvert" contains excerpts from "Doh Blame Me", performed by Lavaman and written by James Charles and Marcus James.
- ^{^[b]} "Honey" contains a sample of "Dance For You" by Beyoncé; and excerpts from "Bump", by Brockhampton

== Personnel ==
Credits adapted from Brockhampton's official website.

Technical

- Russell "Joba" Boring – mixing (except on "Something About Him", "Weight" and "Tape")
- Matt Mysko – mixing (on "Something About Him", "Weight" and "Tape"), mixing assistance, recording assistance
- Andy Maxwell – mixing (on "New Orleans", "Thug Life", "Where the Cash At" and "Vivid"), mixing assistance, recording
- Neal H Pogue – mixing (on "Tonya")
- Romil Hemnani – mixing assistance, recording
- Chris Parker – recording assistance
- Mike Bozzi – mastering

Artwork

- Henock Sileshi – creative direction, album cover direction
- Kevin Abstract – creative direction, album cover direction
- Ashlan Grey – photography, album cover direction
- George Muncey – album cover direction

Strings
(on "Weight", "Loophole", "Tape" and "San Marcos")

- Nicole Garcia – arrangement
- Laura Anstee
- Nick Barr
- Meghan Cassidy
- Rosie Danvers
- Patrick Kiernan
- Steve Morris
- Jenny Sacha
- Ellie Stamford

== Charts ==
=== Weekly charts ===
Chart performance for Iridescence
Chart (2018)	Peak position
Australian Albums (ARIA)	6
Belgian Albums (Ultratop Flanders)	47
Canadian Albums (Billboard)	6
Danish Albums (Hitlisten)	29
Dutch Albums (Album Top 100)	39
Finnish Albums (Suomen virallinen lista)	46
Irish Albums (IRMA)	8
New Zealand Albums (RMNZ)	2
Norwegian Albums (VG-lista)	21
Swedish Albums (Sverigetopplistan)	41
UK Albums (Official Charts)	20
US Billboard 200	1
US Top R&B/Hip-Hop Albums (Billboard)	1

=== Year-end charts ===
2018 Year-end chart performance for Iridescence
Chart (2018)	Position
US Top R&B/Hip-Hop Albums (Billboard)	94
