= Calico (album) =

Studio album by Ryan Beatty
- Released: April 28, 2023
- Studios: Shangri-La; Valentine Recording Studios
- Genres: Indie folk; alt-pop
- Length: 33:42
- Labels: Elektra Records; Atlantic Records

Calico is the third studio album by American singer-songwriter Ryan Beatty. It was released on April 28, 2023, by Elektra in the United States and Atlantic Records in the United Kingdom. The album served as a follow-up to Beatty's second LP, Dreaming of David (2020). The album was written and recorded in California, with all nine tracks co-produced by Beatty and Ethan Gruska.

The album's lone single, "Ribbons", was released on March 17, 2023, featuring contributions from Justin Vernon of Bon Iver. The Guardian gave the album five stars out of five in a year-end review. Calico also appeared in a few year-end lists for 2023, including Coup the Main at number 2 and at number 4 on Los Angeles Times.

== Background ==
All of the writing for Calico was completed prior to Beatty and Gruska beginning production in December 2021. The pair then spent two months finalizing the musical arrangements. Beatty described Calico thematically as "the slow closing of the wound" in an interview with The Line of Best Fit.

== Track listing ==
No.	Title	Writer(s)	Length
1.	"Ribbons"	Beatty; Ethan Gruska	3:17
2.	"Bruises off the Peach"	Beatty; Gruska	3:12
3.	"Cinnamon Bread"	Beatty; Gruska	3:08
4.	"Andromeda"	Beatty; Gruska	3:15
5.	"Bright Red"	Beatty; Michael Uzowuru; Dylan Wiggins	2:49
6.	"Hunter"	Beatty; Gruska; Dylan Day	7:03
7.	"White Teeth"	Beatty; Gruska; Uzowuru; Carter Lang; Michael Gordon	3:58
8.	"Multiple Endings"	Beatty; Gruska	3:16
9.	"Little Faith"	Beatty; Gruska	3:44
Total length:			33:42

Additional instrumentation by Justin Vernon, Rob Moose, Matt Chamberlain, and Sam Gendel.
