= The Army, The Navy =

American musical duo

Background information
- Origin: Mill Valley, California, United States
- Genres: Folk-pop, Indie
- Years active: 2022–present
- Label: New Gold Medal
- Members: Maia Ciambriello; Sasha Goldberg

The Army, The Navy is an American folk-pop band consisting of Maia Ciambriello and Sasha Goldberg.

== History ==
Ciambriello and Goldberg have been friends since childhood. The duo attended the same singing coach growing up. The duo also studied music together in New Orleans at Loyola University together, before moving to Los Angeles. The band is signed to New Gold Medal Records, a label founded by Goldberg's cousin, Marc E. Bassy.

== Career ==
The group began attracting attention due to posting on the app TikTok. The duo released their first EP, Fruit for Flies, on March 8th, 2024. The song "Vienna (In Memoriam)" from the EP has received significant attention. The EP was named one of Knocked Loose guitarist's Nicko Calderon's favorite releases of 2024.

The duo released their second EP, also on December 6th, 2024, titled Sugar for Bugs. The two EP's were released on vinyl by the boutique label Positively Records.

The duo opened for Matt Maltese, Paris Paloma, and Dora Jar in 2024. The duo also opened for James Arthur on his Pisces World tour in 2025.

In March 2025, the duo embarked on their first headline tour in North America, supported by Aggie Miller. The Army, The Navy took their tour to EU/UK with 5 dates in May 2025, supported by Johanna Warren.

In April 2026, the duo announced the release of their debut album, Fake Brave Life out June 12th, 2026 and will be performing at Lollapalooza in July 2026. The duo will be opening for Lord Huron in July 2026.

== Discography ==
=== Albums ===
Title	Details
Fake Brave Life	Released: June 12th, 2026; Label: New Gold Medal; Formats: Streaming, digital download

=== Extended Plays ===
Title	Details
Fruit For Flies	Released: March 8th, 2024; Label: New Gold Medal; Formats: Streaming, digital download
Sugar For Bugs	Released: December 6th, 2024; Label: New Gold Medal; Formats: Streaming, digital download

=== Singles ===
Title	Details
Dirty Laundry	Released: March 28, 2025; Label: New Gold Medal; Formats: Streaming, digital download
Walls	Released: March 6, 2026; Label: New Gold Medal; Formats: Streaming, digital download
Pretty, Pink and Soft	Released: April 3, 2026; Label: New Gold Medal; Formats: Streaming, digital download
Two Collide	Released: May 1, 2026; Label: New Gold Medal; Formats: Streaming, digital download
Down Debbie/Reservoir	Released: May 29, 2026; Label: New Gold Medal; Formats: Streaming, digital download

== Tours ==
=== Headlining ===
- The Gentle Hellraiser Tour (2025)
- The Fake Brave Tour (2026)

=== Supporting ===
- Matt Maltese – Touring Just to Tour (2024)
- Paris Paloma (2024)
- Dora Jar – Behind The Curtain Tour (2024)
- James Arthur – The Pisces World Tour (2025)
- Joy Crookes – Juniper Tour (2025) (UK Only)
- Lord Huron (2026)
