= Sweet (Brockhampton song) =

2017 single by Brockhampton

Single by Brockhampton

from the album Saturation II
- Released: August 22, 2017
- Genre: Hip hop; pop rap
- Length: 4:34
- Label: Question Everything; Empire
- Songwriter(s): Matthew Champion; Ian Simpson; Dominique Simpson; William Wood; Ameer Vann; Russell Boring
- Producer(s): Kiko Merley; Romil Hemnani; Jabari Manwa

Brockhampton singles chronology
"Junky" (2017)	"Sweet" (2017)	"Boogie" (2017)

Music video
- "Sweet" on YouTube

"Sweet" (stylized in all caps) is a song by American hip hop boy band Brockhampton, released on August 22, 2017 as the fourth single from their second studio album Saturation II (2017).

== Composition ==
In the song, members Matt Champion, Dom McLennon, Merlyn Wood, Ameer Vann and Joba rap about their respective backgrounds and the struggles they have faced while growing up. Kevin Abstract performs the chorus.

== Critical reception ==
Joe Price of Complex described the song as "incredibly catchy" and considered its hook to be one of Brockhampton's best. Matthew Strauss of Pitchfork wrote that Dom McLennon "puts on a show" in the song. Neil Z. Yeung of AllMusic commented the song "lures listeners with its unorthodox production".

Live365 placed it at number six in their list "Top 10 Brockhampton Songs".

== Music video ==
The music video was directed by Kevin Abstract, shot by Ashlan Grey, and filmed in Van Nuys, Los Angeles. It features grainy visuals and has been described as "low-concept but highly effective".

== Certifications ==
Region	Certification	Certified units/sales
United States (RIAA)	Gold	500,000^{‡}
^{‡} Sales+streaming figures based on certification alone.
