= Emmanuel (EP) =

EP by Ameer Vann
- Released: September 18, 2019
- Recorded: 2018–19
- Genre: Hip hop
- Length: 16:36
- Label: Winston Wolf; The Orchard
- Producer: Cool & Dre; Cubeatz; Deats; G-Dav; Hit-Boy

Ameer Vann chronology
Ameer Vann EP (2013)	Emmanuel (2019)	Slime in the Ice Machine (with Merlyn Wood) (2023)

Emmanuel (stylized in all caps) is the second extended play (EP) by American rapper Ameer Vann. It was released on September 18, 2019, by Winston Wolf, LLC and The Orchard. The EP is his first solo release since his departure from Brockhampton.

== Release and promotion ==
On September 16, 2019, Vann posted on Instagram himself and a billboard with the album cover, the text reading "AMEER VANN AVAILABLE NOW EMMANUEL". The EP was released at midnight for each time zone respectively, with New Zealand being the first. On September 18, 2019, Vann released the music video for the title track, "Emmanuel". More music videos were released for the tracks "Los Angeles" and "Glock 19" on October 1, 2019 and December 17, 2019, respectively.

== Critical reception ==
The EP received positive reviews from NME and HotNewHipHop,

== Track listing ==
No.	Title	Writer(s)	Producer(s)	Length
1.	"Emmanuel"	Ameer Vann; Marcello Valenzano; Andre Lyon; Dominik Patrzek	Cool & Dre; Deats	2:48
2.	"Pop Trunk"	Vann; Chauncey Hollis; Greg Davis	G-Dav	3:23
3.	"Glock 19"	Vann; Tim Gomringer; Kevin Gomringer; Valenzano; Lyon	Cool & Dre; Cubeatz	3:12
4.	"Los Angeles"	Vann; Hollis; Dustin Dorbett	Hit-Boy	2:23
5.	"Sunday Night"	Vann; Antwan Patton; Michael Render; Nsilo Reddick; Cory Andrews; Valenzano; Lyon; Kristopher Bailey; Nicholas M. Sherwood	Cool & Dre	3:09
6.	"Plastic"	Vann; Hollis	Hit-Boy	1:41
Total length:				16:36

Samples

- "Pop Trunk" contains vocal samples by Pimp C from "International Player’s Anthem (I Choose You)" by UGK.
