= Slow Motion (Matt Champion and Jennie song) =

2024 song by Matt Champion and Jennie

Single by Matt Champion and Jennie

from the album Mika's Laundry
- Released: March 8, 2024
- Recorded: 2021
- Genre: Drum and bass; hip hop; R&B
- Length: 2:46
- Label: RCA
- Songwriters: Adam Feeney; Dijon Duenas; Henry Kwapis; Jacob Reske; Jennie; Matt Champion; Romil Hemnani
- Producers: Matt Champion; Henry Kwapis; Dijon

Matt Champion singles chronology
"Slug" (2024)	"Slow Motion" (2024)	"Dogfish" (2024)

Jennie singles chronology
"One of the Girls" (2023)	"Slow Motion" (2024)	"Spot!" (2024)

Visualizer
- "Slow Motion" on YouTube

"Slow Motion" is a song by American rapper Matt Champion and South Korean singer and rapper Jennie. It was released through RCA Records on March 8, 2024, as the third single from the former's debut studio album, Mika's Laundry (2024). A drum and bass song, it was written by both artists alongside Adam Feeney, Dijon, Henry Kwapis, Jacob Reske, and Romil Hemnani, while it was produced by Champion, Kwapis, and Dijon.

== Background and release ==
American hip-hop boy band Brockhampton, of which Matt Champion was a member, released their final two albums The Family and TM and performed their final show in November 2022, after which the band went into an indefinite hiatus. Champion proceeded to embark on a solo career and released "Aphid" featuring Dijon on February 14, 2024, as the lead single of his debut studio album. On February 24, he followed with the release of the album's second single, "Slug", alongside its music video.

Jennie released two singles as a solo artist in 2023, "You & Me" and "One of the Girls", both of which charted in the top ten of the Billboard Global 200. In December 2023, YG Entertainment confirmed that she did not renew her contract with the label for individual activities. The same month, Jennie announced that she had founded her own record label named Odd Atelier. "Slow Motion" marks her first release since departing from YG Entertainment and establishing her independent label.

The song was revealed to have been created in 2021, three years before its actual release date. On March 3, 2024, the duo teased a collaboration by posting Instagram Stories containing snippets of an unreleased track. Both singers' vocals were audible in the snippets, and the two tagged each other in their respective posts. On March 6, Champion officially announced the collaboration, entitled "Slow Motion", in a social media post containing its cover art, date and time of release, and tagged Jennie in the image. Jennie reshared the image to her Instagram story and added the caption "can't wait for the world to hear our song." The following day, Jennie's label Odd Atelier posted the announcement with the single's cover art on social media. Upon the song's release on March 8, Champion revealed that the song would serve as the third single from his debut studio album, Mika's Laundry, due for release on March 22.

== Recording and development ==
On Instagram, Jennie revealed that she and Champion created "Slow Motion" about three years prior to its release. She shared, "This one’s close to my heart and I’m so excited to share its message with you all. Matt and I worked on this song three years ago and I hope you guys enjoy it as we share a piece of ourselves."

== Lyrics and production ==
Running for two minutes and 46 seconds, "Slow Motion" is a drum and bass, hip hop, and R&B song produced by Dijon, Henry Kwapis and Champion himself, and written by them alongside Jennie, Adam Feeney, Jacob Reske, and Romil Hemnani. RCA Records described the song as "dreamy and idyllic" in comparison to Champion's previous alternative pop track "Slug". It opens with Jennie softly singing over a piano backdrop, which Stereogum's Tom Breihan likened to a "Billie Eilish-style piano ballad." The song then shifts gears to drum and bass when a jungle breakbeat kicks in, before returning back to the piano instrumentation. Lyrically, "Slow Motion" is a love song featuring a "heartrending ode to seasonal shifts and existential malaise," as described by Clash's Shahzaib Hussain. In the chorus, the artists sing together, "If I could stop time for real/ Would make it any easier for me to love you?/ ‘Cause you know I'm shy for you still/ So bad that it kills/ And I can't help but feel/ Like we're moving in slow motion," describing the hardships of being in love.

== Visualizer ==
A visualizer was released alongside the single to Matt Champion's YouTube channel on March 8, 2024. Directed by Anna Pollack, the simplistic video sees the repeated visuals of an eye blinking against the light and dark. It is part of a series of visuals for the album which illustrate Champion's "idyllic future", a dystopian world in which lies the titular club Mika's Laundry.

== Critical reception ==
Uproxx included "Slow Motion" in its list of the best songs of 2024, praising it as a "lush and moving" track. The track was also selected as one of the best global collaborations in 2024 by Rolling Stone Korea, highlighting the easy-listening combination of Jennie's "sophisticated vocals" and Champion's "languid rap".

== Live performances ==
On November 17, 2024, Jennie made a surprise appearance during Matt Champion's set at the Camp Flog Gnaw Carnival held in Dodger Stadium, Los Angeles to perform "Slow Motion" for the first time together live.

== Credits and personnel ==
Credits adapted from Apple Music.

- Matt Champion – vocals, lyricist, composer, producer
- Jennie – vocals, lyricist, composer
- Adam Feeney – lyricist, composer
- Dijon Duenas – lyricist, composer, producer
- Henry Kwapis – lyricist, composer, producer, recording engineer
- Jacob Reske – lyricist, composer
- Romil Hemnani – lyricist, composer
- Kiko Merley – additional producer
- Jack Karaszewski – additional producer
- Adam Loeffler – recording engineer

== Charts ==
Chart performance for "Slow Motion"
Chart (2024)	Peak position
China (TME Korean)	68
New Zealand Hot Singles (RMNZ)	28
South Korea Download (Circle)	116
UK Singles Downloads (Official Charts)	68
UK Singles Sales (OCC)	71

== Release history ==
Release dates and formats for "Slow Motion"
Region	Date	Format	Label	Ref.
Various	March 8, 2024	Digital download; streaming	RCA	
