= Saturation (Brockhampton album) =

Studio album by Brockhampton
- Released: June 9, 2017
- Studios: Brockhampton Factory, South Central, Los Angeles, California; SARM Music Village, London, United Kingdom ("Waste")
- Genres: Alternative Hip Hop; Alternative R&B; Pop rap; West Coast Hip Hop; Hardcore Hip Hop; Indie Rock
- Length: 51:02
- Labels: Brockhampton; Empire
- Producers: Brockhampton: (Kevin Abstract; Romil Hemnani; Joba; Bearface; Q3 (Jabari Manwa; Kiko Merley))

Brockhampton chronology
All-American Trash (2016)	Saturation (2017)	Saturation II (2017)

Singles from Saturation
- 1. "Face" Released: May 6, 2017; 2. "Heat" Released: May 18, 2017; 3. "Gold" Released: May 23, 2017; 4. "Star" Released: May 30, 2017; 5. "Boys" Released: June 1, 2017; 6. "Fake" Released: June 6, 2017

Saturation (stylized in all caps) is the debut studio album by American rap collective Brockhampton. Independently released on June 9, 2017, the album features appearances from group members Kevin Abstract, Ameer Vann, Merlyn Wood, Dom McLennon, Matt Champion, Joba, and Bearface. Production was primarily handled by group members Romil Hemnani, Jabari Manwa, and Kiko Merley, with additional contributions from Joba, Bearface, and No Rome. Manwa, along with Brockhampton webmaster Robert Ontenient, perform the albums vocal skits.

The album's release was preceded by six singles, all of which were released alongside a music video. Saturation was released to critical acclaim, with praise directed towards its diverse sound. A follow-up album, Saturation II, was released on August 25, 2017. On September 3, the group embarked on "Jennifer's Tour", in support of Saturation and Saturation II. Saturation, along with Saturation II, Saturation III, and a documentary detailing the album's recording, was included in the Saturation Boxset, released on December 15, 2017.

== Background and recording ==
Following the release of Brockhampton's debut mixtape All-American Trash, the group relocated to a shared home in South Central, Los Angeles. In May 2017, Brockhampton announced Saturation, at the time referred to as the group's second mixtape. The release date was set for June, although recording had not yet begun at the time of the announcement. Saturation was recorded, produced, and mixed in the groups home, with Romil Hemnani and Joba credited as the recording engineer and mixing engineer, respectively. The entire record was mixed by Joba in three days. Kevin Abstract, Hemnani, and Joba served as executive producers.

Compared to previous releases, Saturation was produced more collaboratively and features a more cohesive sound. The groups dynamic on the record and decision to rap about more specific subject matter was inspired by Wu-Tang Clan's Enter the Wu-Tang (36 Chambers). Wood and McLennon cited the tracks "Milk" and "Trip", respectively, as opportunities to open up on vulnerable verses. Group member Bearface was in London during the albums recording, and contributed the solo track "Waste", written and recorded in a single day alongside No Rome.

== Composition ==
The opening track, "Heat", has been described as "horrorcore-adjacent", with the track's blown-out bass serving as "a moment of catharsis for both the rappers and the listener". "Gold" is as a "zany posse cut", with verses by Matt Champion, Ameer Vann, Merlyn Wood, and Dom McLennon that were regarded by Matthew Strauss of Pitchfork as their best performances on the album. "Star" features an eerie beat, with Abstract, Vann, and McLennon making numerous pop-culture references within their verses. "Boys" contrasts a "swirling" instrumental with deadpan verses from Champion, Vann, and McLennon. On "Trip", Abstract and Vann disavow the suburban lifestyle, whereas "Milk" features an uplifting message of self-acceptance. "Face" has a "pristine beat" that sports a gentle chorus from rapper and singer Joba. The album closer, "Waste", is a guitar-driven ballad featuring a "tortured" performance by Bearface. "Waste" is the only track on the album only featuring one member of the group.

== Release and promotion ==
Saturation was announced on May 3, 2017, for a release in June. The first single, "Face", was released alongside a music video on May 8. For the remainder of the month, the group released music videos on a weekly basis, with "Heat", "Gold", and "Star" receiving videos directed by Abstract and filmed in South Central.

Shortly after the album's announcement, Brockhampton were revealed to be the subject of a Viceland documentary series titled American Boyband. The show premiered a day before the album's release, on June 8. The same day, a non-album single titled "Lamb" was released as the final single in promotion of the album.

== Critical reception ==
Professional ratings
Review scores
Source	Rating
HotNewHipHop	4.5/5 stars
Pitchfork	6.5/10
Pretty Much Amazing	B−
RadioUTD	4.5/5 stars

Saturation received general acclaim from music critics upon its release. DJBooth's Brent Bradley praised the group's chemistry, noting that "With Saturation, Brockhampton has cemented themselves as a force to behold, the next in an all-too-short line of examples in which groups manage to fully realize their dynamic potential". For RadioUTD, Roman Soriano referred to the group's members as "highly talented", continuing that "it's incredible to think that this was put together in just three and a half weeks, given the complexity of this project", praising its "powerful lyricism, great storytelling, and ... cohesive but diverse sound". In a less positive review, Pitchfork's Matthew Strauss called the album a "split between effortless cool and empty platitudes", praising the group's stylishness and assertiveness, but criticizing the album's less aggressive moments as "sappy", revealing "the collective's lyrical weakness".

=== Year-end rankings ===
Year-end rankings for Saturation
Publication	List	Rank	Ref.
BrooklynVegan	BrooklynVegan's Top 50 Albums of 2017	12	
Clash	Clash Albums of the Year 2017	11	
Vinyl Me, Please	The Best Albums of 2017	25	

== Track listing ==
Saturation track listing
No.	Title	Writer(s)	Producer(s)	Length
1.	"Heat"	Ameer Vann; William Wood; Dominique Simpson; Russell Boring; Matthew Champion	Romil Hemnani	4:32
2.	"Gold"	Ian Simpson; Vann; Wood; Champion; D. Simpson; Boring	Q3 (Jabari Manwa; Kiko Merley); Hemnani^{[b]}	4:26
3.	"Star"	I. Simpson; Vann; D. Simpson	Manwa	2:41
4.	"Boys"	I. Simpson; Vann; Wood; D. Simpson; Champion; Boring	Manwa; Hemnani^{[a]}	4:38
5.	"2Pac"	Vann; I. Simpson	Kiko Merley	1:02
6.	"Skit 1"	I. Simpson; Robert Ontenient; Manwa	Hemnani	0:19
7.	"Fake"	I. Simpson; Vann; Wood; D. Simpson; Isaiah Merriweather	Q3	4:36
8.	"Bank"	I. Simpson; D. Simpson; Vann	Manwa; Hemnani^{[a]}	3:16
9.	"Skit 2"	I. Simpson; Ontenient; Manwa	Hemnani	0:16
10.	"Trip"	I. Simpson; Vann; D. Simpson; Boring	Hemnani; Kiko Merley^{[a]}	3:23
11.	"Swim"	I. Simpson; Wood; D. Simpson; Boring	Hemnani; Q3^{[a]}	3:33
12.	"Bump"	I. Simpson; Vann; Wood; Champion; D. Simpson	Hemnani; Joba^{[b]}	2:38
13.	"Cash"	I. Simpson; Wood; Vann; Boring; D. Simpson	Hemnani; Manwa^{[a]}	3:15
14.	"Skit 3"	I. Simpson; Ontenient; Manwa	Hemnani	0:39
15.	"Milk"	I. Simpson; Vann; Wood; Champion; D. Simpson	Hemnani; Q3^{[a]}	4:55
16.	"Face"	Vann; Boring; D. Simpson; Champion	Kiko Merley	4:19
17.	"Waste"	Ciarán McDonald	Bearface; No Rome^{[a]}	2:34
Total length:				51:02

Notes

- All tracks are stylized in all caps. For example, "Heat" is stylized as "HEAT".
- ^{^[a]} signifies an additional producer.
- ^{^[b]} signifies an additional drum programmer.

== Personnel ==
Brockhampton

- Kevin Abstract – performance (tracks 2–5, 7, 8, 10–13, 15), executive production, creative direction
- Ameer Vann – performance (tracks 1–5, 7, 8, 10, 12, 13, 15, 16)
- Merlyn Wood – performance (tracks 1, 2, 4, 7, 11–13, 15)
- Dom McLennon – performance (tracks 1–4, 7, 8, 10–13, 15, 16)
- Matt Champion – performance (tracks 1, 2, 4, 12, 15, 16)
- Joba – performance (tracks 1, 2, 4, 10, 11, 13, 16), additional drum programming (track 12), additional vocals (tracks 7, 12), additional keys (track 16), co-executive production, mixing, mastering
- Bearface – performance (track 17), production (track 17)
- Romil Hemnani – production (tracks 1, 6, 9–15), additional production (tracks 4, 8), additional drum programming (track 2), co-executive production, recording engineering
- Q3 – production (tracks 2, 7), additional production (tracks 11, 15)
  - Jabari Manwa – production (tracks 3, 4, 8), additional production (track 13), additional synth (track 1), performance (tracks 6, 9, 14)
  - Kiko Merley – production (tracks 5, 16), additional production (track 10), performance (track 7)
- Henock Sileshi – creative direction, graphic design
- Ashlan Grey – photography
- Robert Ontenient – webmastering, performance (tracks 6, 9, 14)

Additional personnel

- No Rome – additional production (track 17), additional vocals (track 17)
- Nick Lenzini – creative assistance
- Kevin Doan – creative assistance

== Charts ==
Chart performance for Saturation
Chart (2017)	Peak position
Latvian Albums (LaIPA)	76
New Zealand Heatseeker Albums (RMNZ)	8

== Release history ==
Region	Date	Format	Label	Ref.
Various	June 9, 2017	Digital download; streaming	Brockhampton Records	
Various	December 15, 2017	CD	Brockhampton Records; Empire	
