= Ryan Beatty =

American singer (born 1995)

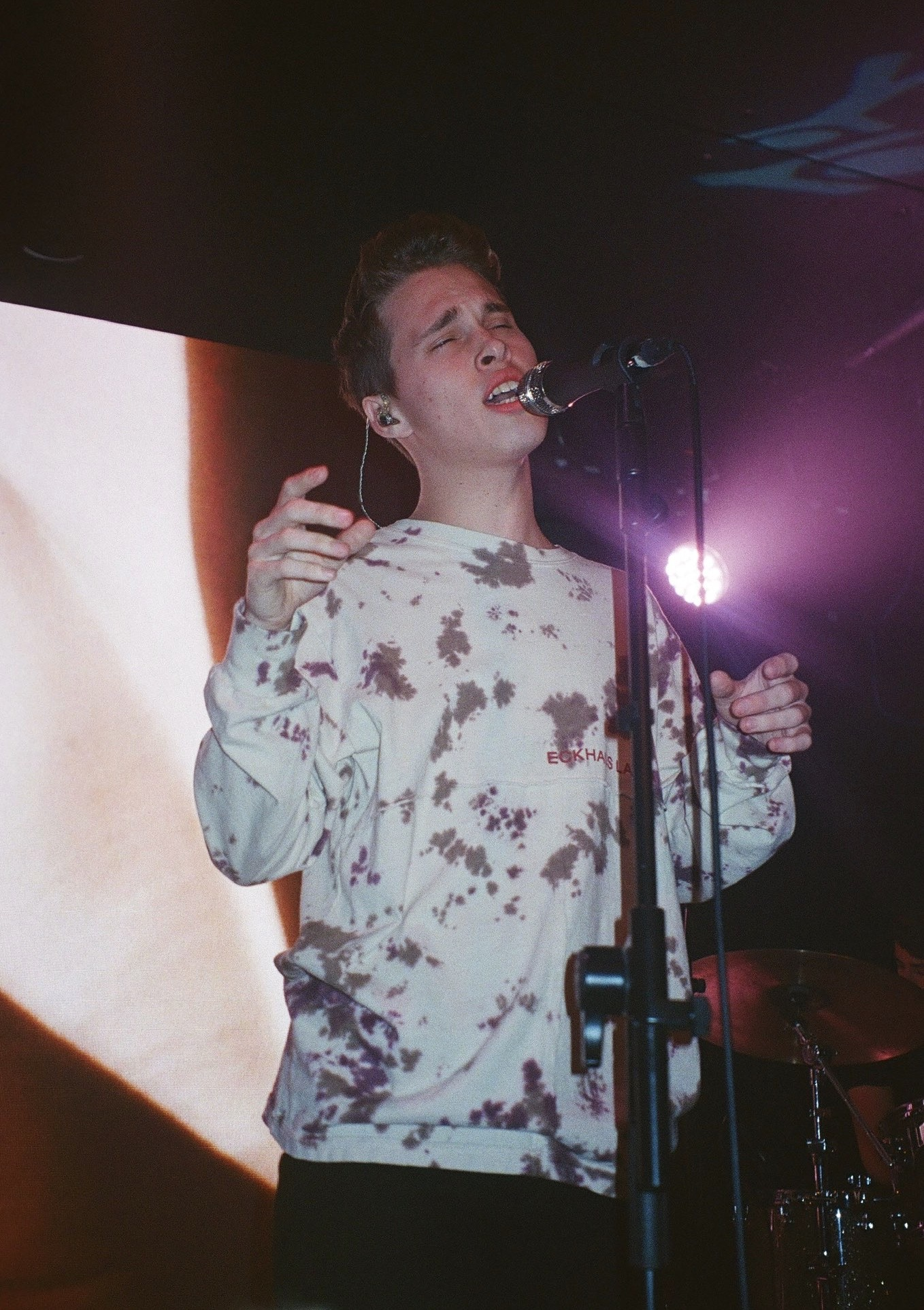
- Beatty performing in Los Angeles, January 2019

Background information
- Born: Ryan Kevin Beatty; September 25, 1995 (age 31); Clovis, California, U.S.
- Genres: Alternative R&B; alt-pop; indie pop; indie folk
- Occupations: Singer; songwriter
- Years active: 2011–present
- Labels: Mad Love; Interscope; Atlantic; Elektra
- Website: ryanbeatty.com

Ryan Kevin Beatty (born September 25, 1995) is an American singer-songwriter. He was born in Clovis, California, and now resides in Los Angeles.

His debut EP, Because of You, was released in 2012. After a hiatus, Beatty began to re-emerge in 2017, first with collaborations on Brockhampton's albums Saturation II and Saturation III. Then, in 2018 he signed to Benny Blanco's imprint label at Interscope Records, Mad Love Records, and released his debut album, Boy in Jeans, on July 20, 2018. He continued his work with Brockhampton on their 2019 album Ginger and member Kevin Abstract's third solo album, Arizona Baby. Beatty has also collaborated with Tyler, the Creator on his 2019 album Igor and the EP Music Inspired by Illumination & Dr. Seuss' The Grinch. He would go on to release his second album, Dreaming of David, on January 31, 2020, and his third studio album, Calico, on April 28, 2023. In 2024 Beatty co-wrote four songs on Beyoncé's Cowboy Carter album, winning the Grammy Award for Album of the Year for his contributions.

== Career ==
=== Early career (2011–2016) ===
Starting in 2011, Beatty covered popular songs and posted them on his YouTube channel. The videos were highly viewed with his most popular song, a cover of Bruno Mars' "Marry You", gaining over 6 million views. He released his debut single "Every Little Thing" in November 2011. Ryan Seacrest premiered Beatty's debut music video "Every Little Thing" on February 2, 2012.

Beatty released his debut EP Because of You which premiered on Radio Disney on July 23, 2012 and was released to the public exclusively on iTunes on July 24, 2012. In 2012, Beatty was chosen to be one of the faces of AT&T's national "It Can Wait" campaign to end texting and driving. The PSA, which urged fans to take the pledge not to text and drive, aired nationwide. Ryan spent the summer of 2013 touring as one of the opening acts on Cody Simpson's Paradise Tour. His first headlining tour was scheduled for November 2013, but was postponed until 2014.

In subsequent interviews after the release of his debut album, Boy in Jeans, in 2018, Beatty described this period somewhat negatively. He felt both creatively and emotionally constrained by his image as a "straight" teen heartthrob and the lack of input he was allowed when he was recording music.

I was just rolling with the punches and dealing with what I was given. Being young I was just really underestimated and I remember never really being taken seriously. I get it, I was like 16, 17 in these sessions, but at the same time I did feel like I had a sense of what I wanted to do or whatever. Back then I didn't feel like I could be myself in any way and the times that I did and I tried to have my own identity, I never felt that it was taken seriously. Can you imagine my entire late teenage years I was being perceived as somebody that I just absolutely wasn't and that's something I can never take back. I don't want this to sound like I regret anything, but it's really difficult.

— Ryan Beatty interviewed by Colin Graves, Ryan Beatty is the Brockhampton Collaborating Boy in Jeans Writing Pure Pop Bops about Boys., Notion Magazine (December 19, 2018)

In 2013, he opted to fire his initial management team only a little over a year after his quick rise to recognition had begun. In a 2020 interview with The Guardian, Beatty recalled firing his manager on a plane flying back to Los Angeles after a gig and telling them, "I can't do this anymore." His decision to fire his management and separate from his first label led to a protracted legal battle that prevented him from releasing music until 2016.

=== Brockhampton and Boy in Jeans (2016–2018) ===
After being inactive for three years, Beatty began to return to recording music in 2016 with the release of his singles "Passion" and "Stay Gold". That same year, he also publicly came out as gay. In 2017, he began collaborating with the rap collective Brockhampton, providing backing vocals on Saturation II's "Queer" and Saturation III's "Bleach".

In 2018, Beatty released his first studio album Boy in Jeans featuring singles "Bruise" and "Camo". He released music videos for almost every song on the album, with the exceptions of "Cupid", "Money", and "Speed". The first music video from the album for "Bruise" was directed by Brockhampton's Kevin Abstract. That same year, he also collaborated with rapper Tyler, the Creator on his EP Music Inspired by Illumination & Dr. Seuss' The Grinch and producer Benny Blanco on his album Friends Keep Secrets. Additionally, he performed with Brockhampton on The Tonight Show Starring Jimmy Fallon, alongside Jazmine Sullivan and serpentwithfeet, singing backing vocals on an early version of the song "Tonya" which later appeared on their album Iridescence. His backing vocals were later cut from the final version of the song.

=== Dreaming of David and musical hiatus (2019–2022) ===
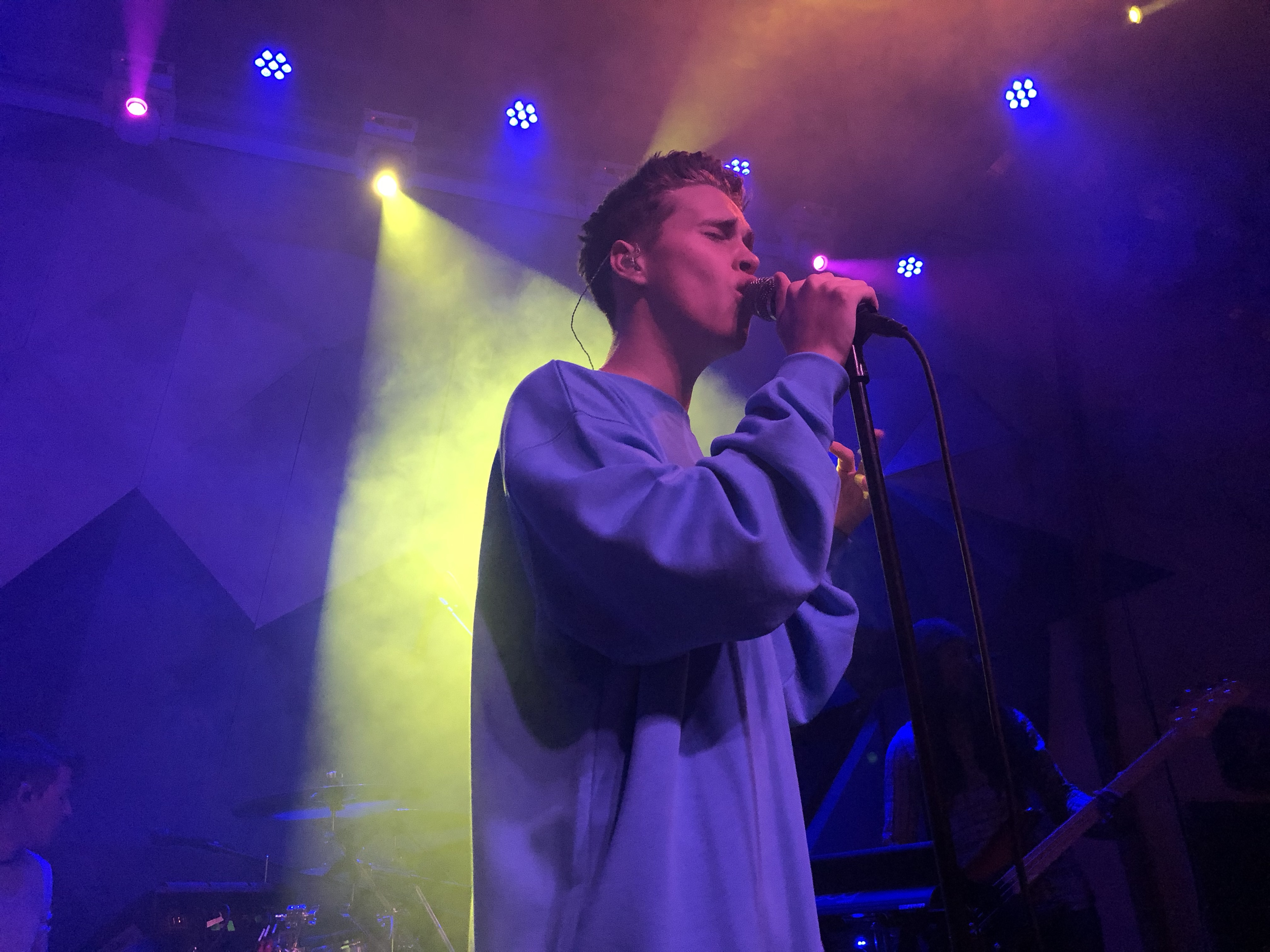
Beatty performing in March 2019

Starting in January 2019, Beatty embarked on a short tour in support of his album Boy in Jeans, first with shows in Los Angeles and Brooklyn and then continuing in March with a West Coast tour with shows in Seattle, Portland, San Francisco, San Diego, and Los Angeles. In a 2020 interview with Complex magazine, he said that he initially delayed touring after the release of Boy in Jeans to focus on recording his second album, Dreaming of David. He continued his collaborations into 2019 with features on Brockhampton member, Kevin Abstract's, third solo album Arizona Baby, Tyler, the Creator's album Igor, Brockhampton's album Ginger (including the single "Sugar"), and Slow Hollow's album Actors.

Soon after the completion of his album Boy in Jeans in 2018, Beatty began work on his follow up album Dreaming of David through 2019. From the end of 2019 into early 2020, Beatty began releasing the singles "Dark Circles", "Patchwork", and "Casino", each with their own accompanying music videos, in the lead up to the release of his second album. On January 31, 2020, Ryan Beatty released Dreaming of David. Soon afterwards, he announced a US tour called "David, I Love You" in support of the album, though this was later cancelled due to the social distancing measures taken in response to the COVID-19 pandemic. Additionally, he appeared in Brockhampton's second music video for their single "Sugar" released in February 2020. He was also featured alongside Dua Lipa and Jon B in the remix of "Sugar", released in March 2020, which included an additional solo verse for Beatty not in the original version. In May 2020, Brockhampton released a single, titled "Twisted", exclusively on YouTube which featured Beatty and Christian Alexander. Beatty featured on Kevin Abstract's 2021 single "Sierra Nights".

=== Calico (2023–2024) ===
On March 15, after a series of Instagram posts and the launch of his new website, Beatty announced his third studio album, Calico, would be released April 28, 2023. The lead single, "Ribbons", was released the following Friday. On April 4, Beatty announced that a live arrangement would be available on his YouTube the following day. Coinciding with the release of the live version, a limited edition vinyl single featuring both studio and live versions of the song was made available for pre-order. With the release of the album came a short film under the same name, containing music videos for the album's first three songs.

Calico was well received with critics calling the album "a transformative step for the visionary singer-songwriter, an intimate and admirable embrace" and "arguably his best work to date." A five date North American concert tour titled "California in Every Color" was announced on May 2, with a five date international leg of the tour being announced on July 18.The tour ran from September 13 to 23, with the international leg being canceled in early October due to logistical issues. Live versions of album tracks "Bruises Off the Peach" and "White Teeth" were made available on his YouTube on May 19, 2023 and June 15, 2023 respectively. His "Calico Tour" ran from February 15 to March 15, 2024. Beatty co-wrote four songs on Beyoncé's Cowboy Carter album,"Protector", "Bodyguard", "Just For Fun, and "II Hands II Heaven" which was released on March 29, 2024.

=== Sweet Fortune (2026–present) ===
Ryan Beatty performing at ACL in 2026

In May 2026, Beatty was announced as part of the lineups for the 2026 All Things Go and Austin City Limits music festivals. On June 1, he announced via Instagram that his fourth studio album, Sweet Fortune, would be released on June 26, 2026. The album's lead single, "Secret Language", was released on June 5, 2026 accompanied with a music video directed by Rhys Scarabosio. The album features songwriting, and backing vocal contributions from Clairo.

== Personal life ==
Beatty came out as gay in June 2016, at the age of 20. He uploaded an Instagram photo of a Gay Power balloon on his Instagram account with the following caption: "proud to be a raging homosexual. it's taken 20 years of suffocating in the closet for me to become comfortable enough to say it, but now I can finally breathe. i did it!"

In May 2020, Beatty expressed support for the Black Lives Matter movement in the wake of national outrage in response to the murder of George Floyd by Minnesota police officer Derek Chauvin. He shared multiple tweets in support of the movement and compelling others to act, in addition to posts from him at a protest on his Instagram story.

== Accolades ==
- 2011: Billboard magazine – Named Beatty as No. 10 on the Next Big Sound chart featuring the fastest growing artists across social media
- 2011: PopStar! magazine – named him one of the 12 new artists to look out for in 2012
- 2011: J-14 magazine – Beatty was featured as their "Hot Guy of the Week"
- 2012: Named to Billboard's "21 Under 21"

Award	Year	Work	Category	Result	Ref.
Teen Choice Awards	2012	Himself	Choice Web Star	Nominated	
Teen Choice Awards	2013	Himself	Choice Web Star	Nominated	
Grammy Awards	2025	Cowboy Carter (Beyoncé)	Album of the Year	Won	

== Discography ==
=== Albums ===
List of albums, with selected details
Title	Album details
Boy in Jeans	Released: July 20, 2018; Label: Self-released; Formats: Streaming, digital download
Dreaming of David	Released: January 31, 2020; Label: Mad Love, Interscope; Formats: Streaming, digital download, LP
Calico	Released: April 28, 2023; Label: Atlantic, Elektra; Formats: Streaming, digital download, CD, LP
Sweet Fortune	Released: June 26, 2026; Label: Atlantic; Formats: Streaming, digital download, CD, LP

=== EPs ===
List of EPs, with selected details and peak chart positions
Title	EP details	Chart positions
Title	EP details	US Current Sales
Because of You	Released: July 2012; Label: Self-released; Formats: digital download	84
Ryan Beatty	Released: October 2013; Label: Self-released; Formats: digital download	—

=== Singles ===
List of singles, showing year released and album name
Title	Year	Album
"Every Little Thing"	2011	Non-album singles
"Hey L.A"	2012	Non-album singles
"Chameleon"	2013	Non-album singles
"Passion"	2016	Non-album singles
"Stay Gold"	2016	Non-album singles
"Bruise"	2018	Boy in Jeans
"Camo"	2018	Boy in Jeans
"Dark Circles"	2019	Dreaming of David
"Patchwork"	2019	Dreaming of David
"Casino"	2020	Dreaming of David
"Ribbons"	2023	Calico
"Secret Language"	2026	Sweet Fortune

=== Guest appearances and writing credits ===
List of guest appearances, with other performing artists, showing year released and album name
Title	Year	Artist(s)	Album
"Queer"	2017	Brockhampton	Saturation II
"Bleach"	2017	Brockhampton	Saturation III
"Don't Speak for Me (True)	2017	Andrew McMahon and the Wilderness	Zombies on Broadway
"Lake House"	2018	Calvin Valentine	Keep Summer Safe
"Lights On"	2018	Tyler, the Creator, Santigold	Music Inspired by Illumination & Dr. Seuss' The Grinch
"When Gloves Come Off"	2018	Tyler, the Creator	Music Inspired by Illumination & Dr. Seuss' The Grinch
"Break My Heart"	2018	Benny Blanco	Friends Keep Secrets
"Baby Boy"	2019	Kevin Abstract	Arizona Baby
"Crumble"	2019	Kevin Abstract, Dominic Fike, Jack Antonoff	Arizona Baby
"I Think"	2019	Tyler, the Creator, Solange	Igor
"No Halo"	2019	Brockhampton	Ginger
"Sugar"	2019	Brockhampton	Ginger
"Ginger"	2019	Brockhampton	Ginger
"Victor Roberts"	2019	Brockhampton	Ginger
"Heart"	2019	Slow Hollows	Actors
"Sugar (Remix)"	2020	Brockhampton, Dua Lipa, Jon B	Non-album singles
"Twisted"	2020	Brockhampton, Christian Alexander	Non-album singles
"Downside"	2020	Brockhampton	Non-album singles
"Count On Me"	2021	Brockhampton	Roadrunner: New Light, New Machine
"Windows"	2021	Brockhampton	Roadrunner: New Light, New Machine
"Jeremiah"	2021	Brockhampton	Roadrunner: New Light, New Machine
"Sierra Nights"	2021	Kevin Abstract	Non-album single
"Go in Light"	2022	Marcus Mumford, Monica Martin	(self-titled)
"Animal"	2022	Brockhampton	TM
"Man on the Moon"	2022	Brockhampton	TM
"Call Me After Midnight"	2024	Bleachers	Bleachers
"Protector"	2024	Beyoncé	Cowboy Carter
"Bodyguard"	2024	Beyoncé	Cowboy Carter
"Just for Fun"	2024	Beyoncé	Cowboy Carter
"II Hands II Heaven"	2024	Beyoncé	Cowboy Carter
".seven"	2024	Fred Again	Ten Days
"Man of the House"	2024	Rachel Zegler	Romeo + Juliet Broadway Soundtrack
"Sommer Regn"	2024	Tyr	4 the Summer
"Time's Up"	2025	Kacy Hill, 6lack	Non-album single
"Something Beautiful"	2025	Miley Cyrus	Something Beautiful
