= Dora Jar =

American musician (born 1996)

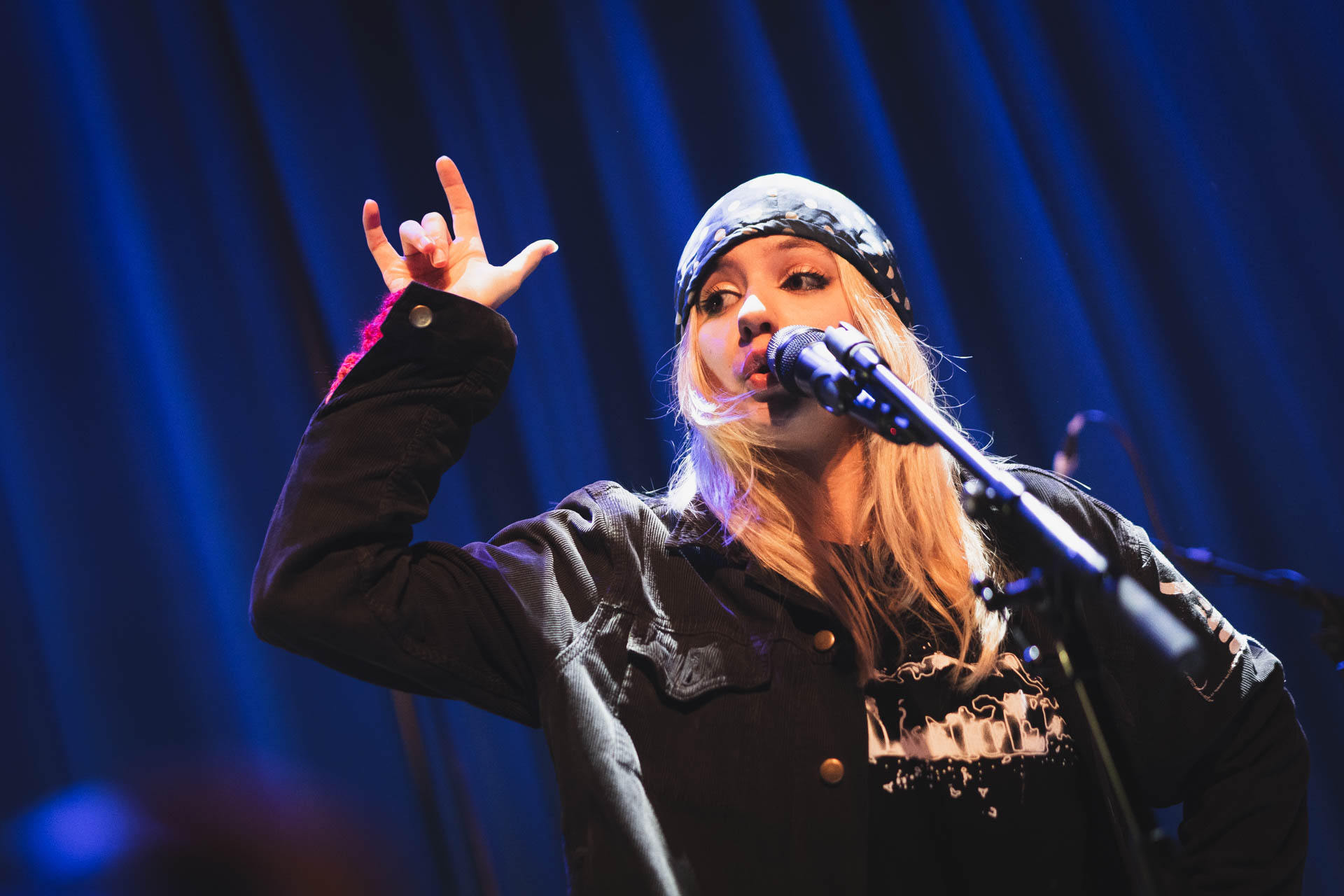
- Jar performing at The Great Escape Festival in Brighton and Hove, England, May 2022

Background information
- Born: Dora Jarkowski; October 12, 1996 (age 29); New York City, U.S.
- Occupations: Singer; songwriter; musician
- Instrument: Vocals
- Years active: 2021–present
- Website: dorajar.world

Dora Jarkowski (born October 12, 1996), known professionally as Dora Jar, is an American bedroom pop musician. She has released a studio album, two extended plays, and three singles as of 2024. She has been included on Vogue's "22 Rising Musicians Set To Rule 2022" and Alternative Press's "Rising Artists" lists, among others.

== Early life and education ==
Jar was born in New York City on October 12, 1996 and grew up in Berkeley, California and Burlingame, moving from New York City at the age of four. Her mother would sing to her fostering a love of music in Jar. Jar would steal her mother's voice recorder and create songs. She loved to listen to the Foo Fighters, Stephen Sondheim musicals, and Outkast. When she was 14 she began to learn to play guitar. Jar attended a small Episcopal school in Northern California. She went to school with the same classmates for ten years. Her mother grew up in New York City in the 1970s. Her older sister Lueza, who had cerebral palsy, died in 2011. Jar then went to boarding school at Choate Rosemary Hall in Wallingford, Connecticut, graduating in 2015. She began her studies at a music school in Boston, but withdrew after a couple of months. She lived for a time in New York, London, and Poland, where some of her father's family lives.

== Career ==
Jar released her debut extended play (EP), titled Digital Meadow, in 2021. The EP is a seven-song collection of her signature dreamy, surrealist pop and silky, ethereal voice. It was produced alongside composer Solomonphonic. Jar notes that she wrote "Scab Song" when she was 19. On her way to Solomon's house to complete the track, she decided to speed it up as an ode to the way music can make one's heart beat faster. Digital Meadow included collaborators like Solomonophonic, Felix Joseph, Ralph Castelli, Vron and John DeBold.

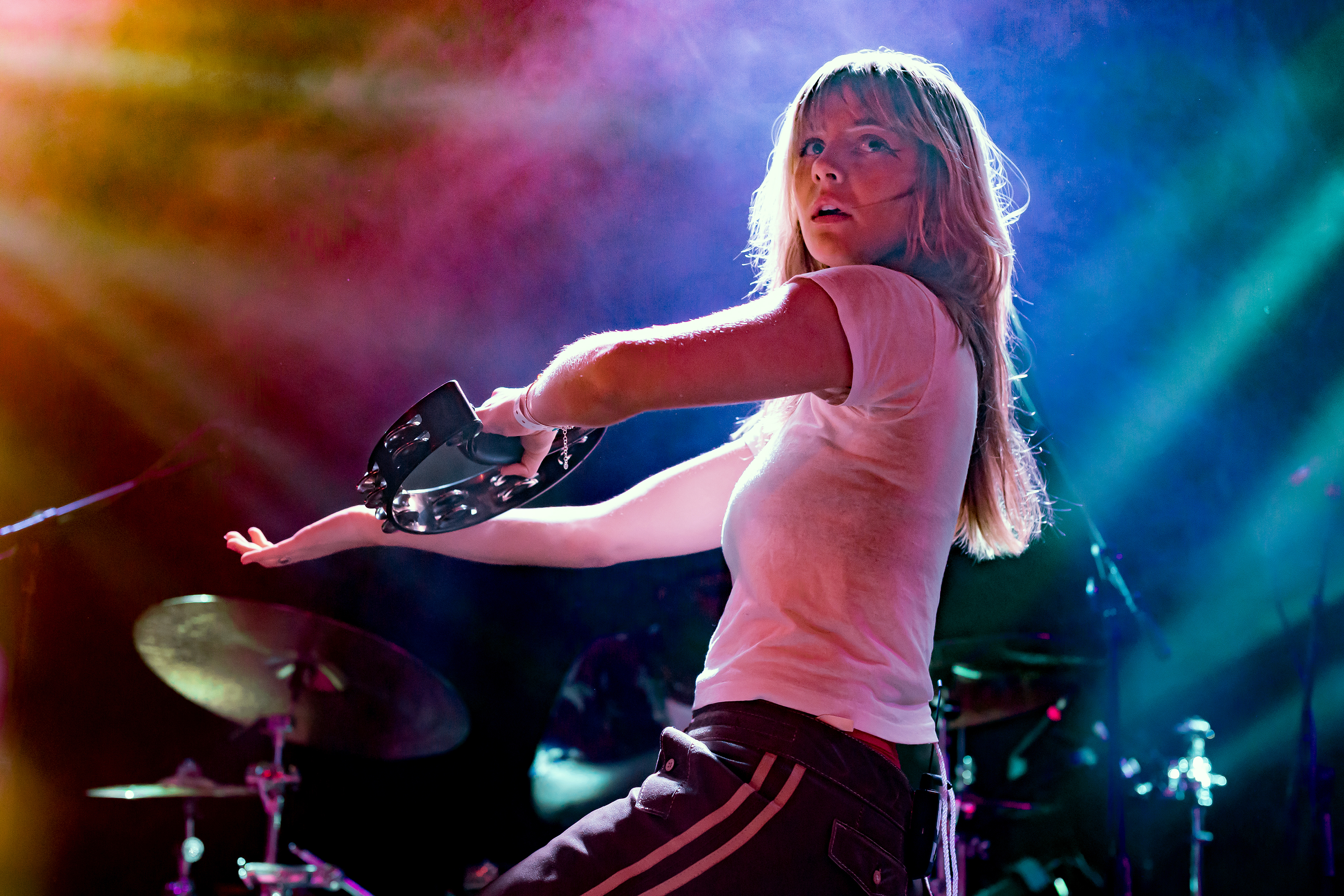
Dora Jar performing live at the Troubadour in West Hollywood, California, November 2022

Jar opened for The Neighbourhood's 2021 tour. She released Comfortably In Pain, her second EP, in 2022. The EP received praise from critics at Pitchfork, NPR, and other publications comparing her flickering vocals and rock-pop to Faye Webster and St. Vincent.

Later in 2021, she performed at The Great Escape festival and opened multiple dates of Billie Eilish's 2022 Happier Than Ever, The World Tour. In the summer of 2022, she signed to Island Records. She released three singles, "Bumblebee", "Bump", and "Spell", before announcing her first North American, twelve-city-headlining tour. A music video was released for "Bump," which was directed by Jocelyn Antequil and plays with an Alice in Wonderland motif.

Jar has been named to Vogue's "22 Rising Musicians Set To Rule 2022" and Alternative Press's "Rising Artists", among others. In August 2023, she was announced as the supporting act for the North American leg of The 1975's 2023/24 concert tour, Still... At Their Very Best.

In July 2024, Jar announced her debut studio album No Way To Relax When You Are On Fire alongside the snippet for its fourth single "Ragdoll". No Way To Relax When You Are On Fire came out on September 13 with its accompanying "Behind The Curtain Tour" with support from The Army, The Navy commencing shortly afterwards.

== Artistry ==
Regarding influences, Jar said "everything from my childhood is a reference point". Her mother, a stage actress, would sing show tunes around the house while her father often whistled Puccini and Madama Butterfly; Jar called the musical theater she grew up around, particularly Stephen Sondheim, a "staple in my sound". Meanwhile, her father would play The Beatles in the car; Jar praised the band's "confidence in the nonsensical".

Outkast's ATLiens (1996) was the first album Jar purchased, while her first live music experience was a Foo Fighters concert. She cited a particular love for the latter's In Your Honor (2005) album and learned guitar playing their songs. She called meeting Dave Grohl a "solidifying moment." In addition, she remembers "obsessing over" Gwen Stefani and Mary J. Blige.

Wheatus and Elton John have shouted her out. John played "Scab Song" on his radio show and is a "hero to our family." John used to fund a scholarship at the Bridge School in Hillsborough, California, which her older sister attended and a family friend's son used to receive annual Christmas cards from Elton John. Some of her industry friends are Arlo Parks, Remi Wolf, Billie Eilish, and Ashnikko. A number of musicians such as Conan Gray and Remi Wolf cite Jar as a prominent influence in their work.

== Discography ==
Studio Albums

- No Way to Relax When You Are on Fire (September 13, 2024)

EPs

- Digital Meadow (May 28, 2021)
- comfortably in pain (March 4, 2022)

== Tours ==
=== Headlining ===
- The Opening Tour (2022)
- Behind the Curtain Tour (2024)

=== Opening ===
- Happier Than Ever, The World Tour with Billie Eilish (2022)
- Still... At Their Very Best with The 1975 (2023)
- The Secret of Us Tour with Gracie Abrams (2025)
- I Quit Tour with Haim (2025)
