= Saturation II =

Studio album by Brockhampton
- Released: August 25, 2017
- Studios: Brockhampton Factory, Van Nuys, California
- Genres: Alternative Hip Hop; Pop Rap; West Coast Hip Hop; Hardcore Hip Hop; Alternative R&B
- Length: 48:02
- Labels: Question Everything; Empire
- Producers: Brockhampton: (Kevin Abstract; Romil Hemnani; Joba; Bearface; Q3 (Jabari Manwa; Kiko Merley))

Brockhampton chronology
| Saturation (2017) | Saturation II (2017) | Saturation III (2017) |

Singles from Saturation II
- 1. "Gummy" Released: August 2, 2017; 2. "Swamp" Released: August 8, 2017; 3. "Junky" Released: August 15, 2017; 4. "Sweet" Released: August 22, 2017

Saturation II is the second studio album by American hip hop boy band Brockhampton, released on August 25, 2017. Production is primarily handled by Romil Hemnani, alongside production duo Q3 (composed of Jabari Manwa and Kiko Merley), Bearface, Kevin Abstract, and Joba.

== Background ==
With only a few months since the release of their debut album, Saturation (2017), the group revealed plans to release the sequel to the predecessor. The album's official cover art and tracklist was revealed on August 21, 2017.

== Singles ==
The album was supported by four singles, "Gummy", "Swamp", "Junky" and "Sweet". The lead single, "Gummy" was released on August 2, 2017. The second single, "Swamp" was released on August 8, 2017. The third single, "Junky" was released on August 15, 2017. The fourth and final single, "Sweet", was released August 22, 2017, alongside "Follow", the lead single from the upcoming Saturation III. However, it was later revealed that "Follow" would not be on Saturation III. As the four singles were released, they were accompanied by their own music videos.

== Critical reception ==
Professional ratings
Review scores
| Source | Rating |
|---|---|
| AllMusic | 3.5/5 stars |
| GigSoup | 4.5/5 stars |
| HotNewHipHop | 85% |
| PopMatters | 4/5 stars |
| Pitchfork | 7.2/10 |
| Pretty Much Amazing | A− |
| The Young Folks | 4.5/5 stars |

Saturation II received general acclaim from music critics upon its release, with most favouring it over its predecessor. For Fact, Al Horner called the album "sublime", commenting that "on the adventurous, quietly subversive Saturation II, [Brockhampton] dare to imagine a better hip-hop world to blaze trails in". He however warned of a "suspicion that Brockhampton could do with reviewing their balance of quality versus quantity", criticizing "moments on Saturation II that reduce its pace to a drag like the sluggish 'Chick'".

Reviewing the album for AllMusic, Neil Z. Yeung wrote that "building upon the promise of its predecessor, II is another genre-blurring collection of thrills that's packed with even more wild energy and potential. The flurry of activity produced by this gang of strong personalities manages to be a cohesive and seamless experience."

In a positive review for Pitchfork, Matthew Strauss praised the group's "sleek and cool performance style" and "aggression and swagger", as well as noting that the group have "ameliorated some of their more glaring flaws that existed on their debut". However, Strauss criticized the group's chemistry, writing that "there are precious few moments where they complement each other or build on distinct themes", summarizing that "there remains a sense that no matter how cool BROCKHAMPTON sound, they prize coolness more than they prize breaking molds and taking risks to become something bigger."

For PopMatters, Christopher Thiessen praised the group for "creat[ing] a new offering that is equally refreshing and enjoyable by pretty much following their original formula to the letter". In a joint review of the trilogy's first two installments for Pretty Much Amazing, Mick Jacobs wrote that "Brockhampton understands how to get your attention: by addressing all the shit that's taking up yours right this moment", asserting that "where Saturation feels more upfront, II feels more mischievous, a willingness to twist things to their own perception".

Ryan Feyre wrote for The Young Folks that "much like on their previous album, Brockhampton brings versatility on every corner of Saturation II, and … they’ve even one-upped themselves". DJBooth's Henry Solotaroff-Webber highlighted the tracks "Queer", "Junky" and "Summer" as highlights, concluding that "despite the wild, creative energy Saturation II embodies as they charge toward their final destinations, the album is far from slapdash, is mostly cohesive and has certainly yielded some diamonds".

=== Year-end rankings ===
Year-end rankings for Saturation II
| Publication | List | Rank | Ref. |
|---|---|---|---|
| BrooklynVegan | BrooklynVegan's Top 50 Albums of 2017 | 12 | |
| Consequence of Sound | Top 50 Albums of 2017 | 34 | |
| Highsnobiety | The 25 Best Albums of 2017 | 14 | |
| New York Daily News | The 25 Albums of 2017 | 25 | |
| Pigeons & Planes | Best Albums of 2017 | 15 | |
| Pretty Much Amazing | The Best Albums of 2017 | 17 | |
| The Skinny | The Skinny's Top 50 Albums of 2017 | 40 | |
| State | State's Albums of 2017 | 5 | |
| Stereogum | The 50 Best Albums of 2017 | 11 | |
| Vinyl Me, Please | The Best Albums of 2017 | 25 | |

== Track listing ==
Saturation II track listing
| No. | Title | Writer(s) | Producer(s) | Length |
|---|---|---|---|---|
| 1. | "Gummy" | Ian Simpson; William Wood; Ameer Vann; Dominique Simpson; Matt Champion; Russell Boring | Romil Hemnani; Q3 (Jabari Manwa; Kiko Merley)^{[a]}; Joba^{[a]} | 4:20 |
| 2. | "Queer" | Champion; Wood; I. Simpson; D. Simpson; Vann | Hemnani; Manwa^{[a]} | 3:47 |
| 3. | "Jello" | I. Simpson; Champion; Vann; D. Simpson; Boring | Hemnani; Bearface | 4:00 |
| 4. | "Teeth" | Vann | Hemnani | 1:20 |
| 5. | "Swamp" | I. Simpson; Champion; Vann; Wood; D. Simpson; Boring | Manwa | 4:11 |
| 6. | "Scene 1" | I. Simpson; Robert Ontenient | Hemnani | 0:39 |
| 7. | "Tokyo" | Boring; I. Simpson; Vann; D. Simpson | Hemnani; Manwa | 3:12 |
| 8. | "Jesus" | I. Simpson; Ciarán McDonald | Hemnani | 1:20 |
| 9. | "Chick" | Champion; Vann; D. Simpson; I. Simpson | Hemnani | 3:24 |
| 10. | "Junky" | I. Simpson; Vann; Wood; Boring; Champion; D. Simpson | Hemnani; Q3^{[a]}; Joba^{[a]} | 4:08 |
| 11. | "Scene 2" | I. Simpson; Ontenient | Hemnani | 0:29 |
| 12. | "Fight" | Vann; D. Simpson; I. Simpson; Wood | Hemnani; Kevin Abstract^{[a]} | 3:01 |
| 13. | "Sweet" | Champion; I. Simpson; D. Simpson; Wood; Vann; Boring | Kiko Merley; Hemnani^{[b]}; Manwa^{[b]} | 4:34 |
| 14. | "Gamba" | D. Simpson; I. Simpson; McDonald | Hemnani; Manwa; Kevin Abstract^{[a]} | 3:22 |
| 15. | "Sunny" | Wood; I. Simpson; Vann; Boring; McDonald | Bearface; Hemnani^{[a]} | 2:50 |
| 16. | "Summer" | McDonald | Bearface | 3:24 |
| Total length: | | | | 48:02 |

Notes

- ^{^[a]} signifies an additional producer
- ^{^[b]} signifies an additional drum programmer
- All tracks stylised in all caps. For example, "Gummy" is stylised as "GUMMY"

== Personnel ==
Brockhampton

- Kevin Abstract – performance (tracks 1–3, 5, 7–10, 12–15), additional production (tracks 12, 14), executive production, creative direction
- Ameer Vann – performance (tracks 1–5, 7, 9, 10, 12, 13, 15)
- Dom McLennon – performance (tracks 1–3, 5, 7, 9, 10, 12–14)
- Matt Champion – performance (tracks 1–3, 5, 9, 10, 13)
- Merlyn Wood – performance (tracks 1, 2, 5, 10, 12, 13, 15)
- Russell "Joba" Boring – performance (tracks 1, 3, 5, 7, 10, 13, 15), additional production (tracks 1, 10), co-executive production, mixing, mastering
- Bearface – performance (tracks 8, 14–16), production (tracks 3, 15, 16)
- Romil Hemnani – production (tracks 1–4, 6–12, 14), additional drum programming (track 13), co-executive production, recording engineering
- Q3 – additional production (track 1, 10)
  - Jabari Manwa – production (tracks 5, 7, 14), additional production (track 2), additional drum programming (track 13)
  - Kiko Merley – production (track 13)
- Henock Sileshi – creative direction, graphic design
- Ashlan Grey – photography
- Robert Ontenient – webmastering, performance (tracks 6, 11)

Additional personnel

- Ryan Beatty – additional vocals (track 2)
- Dijon Duenas – additional vocals (track 16)
- Nick Lenzini – creative assistance
- Kevin Doan – creative assistance

== Charts ==
Chart performance for Saturation II
| Chart (2017) | Peak position |
|---|---|
| Belgian Albums (Ultratop Flanders) | 108 |
| Canadian Albums (Billboard) | 50 |
| Dutch Albums (Album Top 100) | 156 |
| New Zealand Albums (RMNZ) | 35 |
| UK Independent Albums (Official Charts) | 44 |
| UK R&B Albums (Official Charts) | 17 |
| US Billboard 200 | 57 |
| US Independent Albums (Billboard) | 12 |
| US Top R&B/Hip-Hop Albums (Billboard) | 34 |
