= Ameer Vann =

American rapper

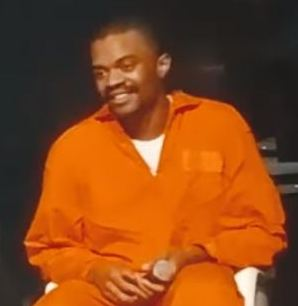
- Ameer Vann performing at Music Hall Minneapolis in February 2018

Background information
- Born: Ameer Emmanuel Vann; September 22, 1996 (age 30); Houston, Texas, U.S.
- Origin: Los Angeles, California, U.S.
- Genre: Hip-hop
- Occupation: Rapper
- Years active: 2010–present
- Labels: Winston Wolf; The Orchard; RCA
- Formerly of: Brockhampton; AliveSinceForever
- Website: https://www.ameervann.world

Ameer Emmanuel Vann (born September 22, 1996) is an American rapper. He is best known for being a member of music collective Brockhampton, until he left Brockhampton in May 2018. After leaving Brockhampton, Vann started his solo career and released his first commercial EP, Emmanuel, in September 2019.

== Early life ==
Ameer Emmanuel Vann was born in Houston, Texas, on September 22, 1996. He attended The Woodlands High School in Texas with future Brockhampton bandmates Kevin Abstract, Joba, Matt Champion, and Merlyn Wood. He held various jobs before joining Brockhampton, including working in a slaughterhouse and as a trash collector. Vann has also revealed in several songs that he has had a pill addiction due to sleeping problems, and often sold drugs from his mother's house.

== Career ==
Vann embarked on his career as a member of AliveSinceForever, a group that started on the forum KanyeToThe in 2010, from which Brockhampton would eventually form. He was featured on their only project, The ASF EP, released on July 29, 2013, on the tracks "Silent Water" and "Rabbits", both with Kevin Abstract.

Vann also released an eponymous EP, titled Ameer Vann EP, on October 29, 2013. He was one of the founding members of Brockhampton in 2015, and along with Kevin Abstract, contributed to "a fair amount of the group's image and vision". Vann has been called, "the face of the Saturation trilogy", being featured on the covers of Brockhampton's 2017 albums, Saturation, Saturation II, and Saturation III.

However, the group decided to part ways with Vann on May 27, 2018, following sexual abuse allegations. After a hiatus and disappearance from social media, Vann reemerged on September 16, 2019, to announce the release of his debut commercial project Emmanuel, the following night. Vann's first solo live performance was at Sound Of Brazil (S.O.B.'s) in New York City on September 23, 2019. The setlist included tracks from Emmanuel and older tracks from 2017, as well as unreleased songs.

On October 15, 2020, Vann released the Donut-produced single "Keep Your Distance" via Winston Wolf and RCA Records. On January 14, 2021, Vann released a second single titled "IDFIATOK" (an acronym for "I Don't Fit In and That's OK").

On October 27, 2023, Vann released a collaborative album titled Slime in the Ice Machine with former Brockhampton bandmate Merlyn Wood. On August 9, 2024, Vann independently released his first studio album titled Woof. In 2025, Vann was a featured artist on four songs on Kevin Abstract's album Blush, released on June 27.

== Artistry ==
Vann is best known for his laid-back flow and frequent exploration of themes of racism, cynicism, substance abuse and introspection.

== Controversies ==
=== Sexual misconduct allegations ===
In May 2018, Vann was the subject of sexual misconduct and abuse allegations, after two women detailed their experiences with him, including him being, "emotionally manipulative and mentally abusive." He later responded to the allegations, denying sexual misconduct or sexual relations with a minor, in a series of tweets.

"In response to the claims of emotional and sexual abuse: Although my behavior has been selfish, childish, and unkind, I have never criminally harmed anyone or disrespected their boundaries. I have never had relations with a minor or violated anybody's consent."

As a result, Brockhampton delayed and ultimately shelved the release of their then-upcoming fourth studio album Puppy, which was scheduled to be released the following month, as well as cancelling their remaining tour dates. On May 27, a statement was issued by the group announcing Vann's departure.

=== Robbery accusations ===
In December 2018, former bandmate Dom McLennon posted a tweet claiming he thinks that Vann had arranged for one of his friends to be robbed, and did not reveal his involvement until after the controversy that led to his departure. McLennon later addressed this in Brockhampton's "Dearly Departed" from their 2019 album Ginger, elaborating on the robbery and further criticising Vann's behaviour. Vann denied the allegations in a freestyle he posted on his Instagram page in March 2021.

== Discography ==
=== Studio albums ===
- Woof (2024)

=== Collaborative albums ===
- Slime in the Ice Machine (with Merlyn Wood) (2023)

=== Extended plays ===
- Ameer Vann EP (2013)
- Emmanuel (2019)

=== With Brockhampton ===
==== Studio albums ====
- Saturation (2017)
- Saturation II (2017)
- Saturation III (2017)

==== Mixtapes ====
- All-American Trash (2016)

=== With AliveSinceForever ===
==== Extended plays ====
- The ASF EP (2013)

=== Singles ===
List of singles as lead artist, with showing year released and album name
Title	Year	Album
"A Wizard Told Me"	2015	non-album singles
"Sincerely, Yours"	2016	non-album singles
"I'm Sorry"	2016	non-album singles
"High Tolerance"	2017	non-album singles
"Keep Your Distance"	2020	non-album singles
"IDFIATOK"	2021	non-album singles

=== Guest appearances ===
List of non-single guest appearances, with other performing artists, showing year released and album name
Title	Year	Artist(s)	Album
"Avian"	2013	Dom McLennon	Thesis
"IWB"	2014	Kevin Abstract, Dom McLennon, Matt Champion	non-album single
"Kill Me v2"	2015	Kevin Abstract	MTV1987: Basement Demos
"Not On DOASM 01"	2015	Kevin Abstract, Matt Champion	non-album singles
"Song For Anna"	2015	Kevin Abstract	non-album singles
"FreeBobbyShmurda"	2016	Kevin Abstract, Matt Champion	non-album singles
"Neighborhood Goats"	2017	Mike Melinoe	A Night, with Hanabi
"Don't Call"	2017	Invictus	Sleepless
"Watch It"	2021	Sanni	If You Don't Understand It's OK
"H-Town"	2025	Kevin Abstract, SoGone SoFlexy	Blush
"NOLA"	2025	Kevin Abstract, Truly Young, Love Spells, Diego, Drigo, JPEGMafia, Quadeca	Blush
"Pop Out"	2025	Kevin Abstract, Drigo, E Bleu, Devan, Love Spells	Blush
"Bloom"	2025	Kevin Abstract, Love Spells	Blush
"Red Light"	2025	Kevin Abstract, Quadeca	Blush
