= Matt Champion =

American rapper and singer (born 1995)

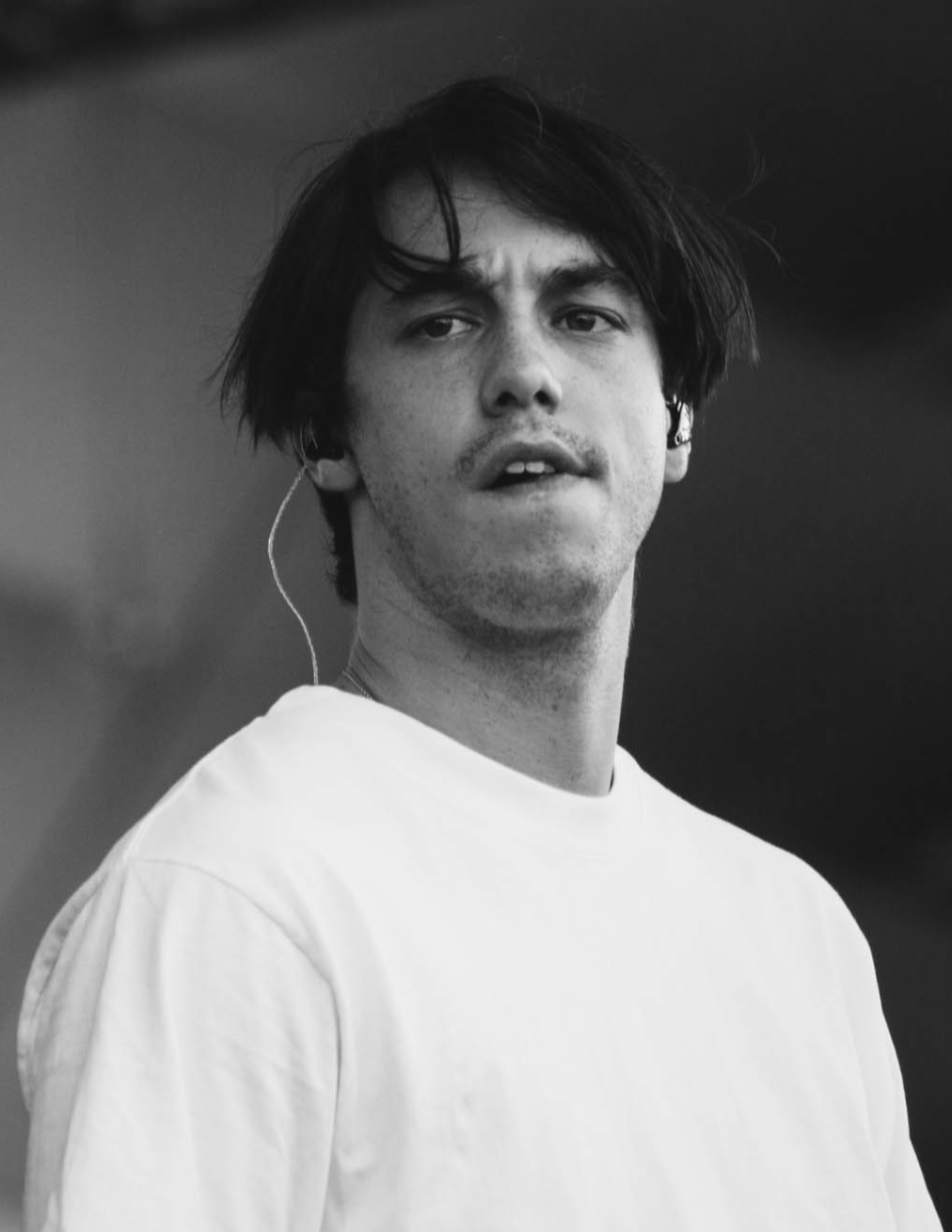
- Champion performing in 2018 in Quebec City

Background information
- Born: Matthew Garrett Champion; February 14, 1995 (age 31)
- Origin: The Woodlands, Texas
- Genres: Rap
- Occupations: Rapper; singer; songwriter
- Years active: 2014–present
- Label: RCA
- Formerly of: Brockhampton
- Website: mattchampion.co

Matthew Garrett Champion (born February 14, 1995) is an American rapper, singer, and songwriter. He is known for his role as a member of hip hop collective and boyband Brockhampton, with whom he released eight studio albums. His debut solo album, Mika's Laundry, was released on March 22, 2024.

== Early life ==
Champion was raised in The Woodlands, Texas, and is of partial Japanese American ancestry. While a student at The Woodlands High School, Champion began rapping and met his future bandmates Kevin Abstract, Ameer Vann, Merlyn Wood, and Russell "Joba" Boring.

== Career ==
=== 2014-2022: Brockhampton ===
Champion joined AliveSinceForever, an internet music collective, in 2014 shortly before the group reorganized into Brockhampton. Along with the rest of the group, Champion relocated to San Marcos, and later Los Angeles.

Champion contributed to the groups mixtape, All-American Trash in 2016, and later appeared on the groups breakthrough debut album Saturation, released on June 9, 2017. Saturation was followed by Saturation II and Saturation III on August 25 and December 15, respectively. In May 2018, Ameer Vann was removed from Brockhampton amidst allegations of sexual misconduct. Shortly afterwards, the group cancelled their planned fourth studio album, and released a new record, Iridescence, on September 21. Iridesence became the group's first album to debut atop the Billboard charts. It was followed by Ginger on August 23, 2019. In January 2022, the group announced that they would go on an indefinite hiatus, and cancelled all remaining shows in support of their sixth studio album Roadrunner: New Light, New Machine (2021).

The final Brockhampton albums, The Family and TM, were released on November 17 and 18, respectively. The latter record, which consisted of outtakes from the groups recording sessions in 2020 and 2021, was curated and executive produced by Champion.

=== 2014-2021: Early solo work ===
In June 2014, a nineteen year-old Champion's debut single "Die For Me" was featured by Pigeons and Planes in "5 On It", a feature highlighting underground hip-hop artists. The next month, he appeared as a featured artist on bandmate Kevin Abstract's debut studio album MTV1987. On December 31st, Champion released the single "Burn", featuring Memphis rapper Jon Waltz. On April 6, 2015, Champion and Ameer Vann made appearances on Abstract's single "Not On DOASM 01", a cut track from Abstract's sophomore album American Boyfriend: A Suburban Love Story, at the time titled Death of a Super Model. On April 27, Champion was once again a featured artist on "Not On DOASM 02". On May 11, Champion released the single "El Dorado" alongside a corresponding music video.

After a nearly year-long hiatus, his next single "Punks" was released in February 2016, and was described as a refinement of the sound of his previous singles. On March 23, he released the single "Salud", featuring Abstract and Michael Christmas. On December 22, "Mansions" was released along with the promise of a studio album the following year. On February 17th 2017, Champion's next single "Fangs" was listed by Pigeons and Planes as one of the best singles of that week.

On April 6, 2021, Champion appeared as a featured artist on 97 Blossom, the debut extended play by The Blossom, released on bandmates Kevin Abstract and Romil Hemnani's record label Video Store. The EP also featured collaborations with Abstract, Hemnani, and Brockhampton producer Jabari Manwa.

=== 2024–present: Mika's Laundry ===
On February 14, Champion released his first solo work since Brockhampton's dissolution. The single "Aphid", featuring American singer Dijon, was produced by Champion and Henry Kwapis and has been described as "lush" and "melodic". "Aphid" was followed by "Slug", a "nostalgia-inducing funk and soul" track on February 28. On March 3, Champion began teasing a collaboration with South Korean rapper Jennie. The resulting drum and bass song, "Slow Motion", was released on March 8 alongside the announcement of Mika's Laundry, Champion's debut solo album, released on March 22.

On June 20, Champion appeared on the cover of Clash's 20th anniversary edition, titled "Kool Things". On October 2, it was announced that Champion would appear in the feature film Strobe, directed by Taylor Cohen and produced by Tara Razavi, Nate Matteson, and Hiro Murai. On October 18, Champion was announced as a performer at the 2024 Camp Flog Gnaw Carnival.

On October 24, Champion released "Faye", the first installment of a planned series of singles intended to expand upon Mika's Laundry. On October 30, "Faye" was followed by "Hacker". A third single, "SPJ", was released the following week. On November 13, Champion released the fourth and final single, "Ash" featuring Deb Never, who had previously appeared alongside Champion on the Brockhampton album Ginger. The same day, the four singles were collected and released as part of an extended play titled Slint's Favorite.

== Personal life ==
As of August 2026, Champion is married to Canadian model and designer Tavia Bonetti. Champion has starred in campaigns for Bonetti's brand, Friends With Animals. As of 2025, the couple has relocated from Los Angeles to Seoul. Champion has a tattoo on his wrist of the number eleven, a reference to the character of the same name from the television series Stranger Things.

== Discography ==
=== Studio albums ===
List of studio albums
Title	Album details
Mika's Laundry	Released: March 22, 2024; Label: RCA; Formats: Streaming, digital download, LP

=== Extended plays ===
List of extended plays
Title	Details
Slint's Favorite	Released: November 13, 2024; Label: RCA; Formats: Streaming, digital download

=== Singles ===
==== As lead artist ====
List of singles as lead artist, showing year released, selected chart positions and name of the album
Title	Year	Peak chart positions			Album
Title	Year	KOR DL	NZ Hot	UK DL	Album
"Die with Me"	2014	—	—	—	Non-album singles
"Burn" (featuring Jon Waltz)	2015	—	—	—	Non-album singles
"El Dorado"	2015	—	—	—	Non-album singles
"You're Too Cool for Me"	2015	—	—	—	Non-album singles
"Punks"	2016	—	—	—	Non-album singles
"Salud" (featuring Michael Christmas)	2016	—	—	—	Non-album singles
"Mansions"	2016	—	—	—	Non-album singles
"Fangs"	2017	—	—	—	Non-album singles
"Aphid" (featuring Dijon)	2024	—	—	—	Mika's Laundry
"Slug"	2024	—	—	—	Mika's Laundry
"Slow Motion" (with Jennie)	2024	116	28	68	Mika's Laundry
"Dogfish"	2024	—	—	—	Mika's Laundry
"Faye"	2024	—	—	—	Slint's Favorite
"Hacker"	2024	—	—	—	Slint's Favorite
"SPJ"	2024	—	—	—	Slint's Favorite
"Ash" (featuring Deb Never)	2024	—	—	—	Slint's Favorite
"—" denotes releases that did not chart or were not released in that region.

==== As featured artist ====
List of singles as a featured artist, showing year released and album name
Title	Year	Album
"Not On DOASM 1" (Kevin Abstract featuring Matt Champion and Ameer Vann)	2015	Non-album singles
"Not On DOASM 2" (Kevin Abstract featuring Matt Champion)	2015	Non-album singles

=== Guest appearances ===
List of non-single guest appearances, with other performing artists, showing year released and album name
Title	Year	Other performer(s)	Album
"Snakes"	2014	Kevin Abstract	MTV1987
"Drown"	2016	Young Lungs, Cian P, Roy	Contradiction
"Smoke"	2021	The Blossom	97 Blossom

== Filmography ==
Year	Title		
Year	Title	Role	Medium
2015	Dreams Die Young	Himself	Short Series
2016	All-American Trash Documentary	Himself	Documentary
2017	Helmet Boy	Clyde	Short Series
2017	American Boyband	Himself	Documentary Series
2017	Jennifer's Tour, A Live Show By Brockhampton	Himself	Documentary Series
2017	Billy Star	Van Nuys Matt / "South Central" Crew	Short Film
2017	Saturation	Himself	Documentary
2018	Love Your Parents Tour	Himself	Documentary Series
2018	The Longest Summer In America	Himself	Documentary
2019	Keeping The Band	Himself (fictionalized depiction)	Series
2021	Live from The Chapel	Himself	Concert film
TBA	Strobe †	TBA	Feature film

Key
†	Denotes films that have not yet been released

=== Music Videos ===
List of music videos as Matt Champion
Title	Year	Album(s)	Director(s)
"El Dorado"	2015	—N/a	Matt Champion, Albert Gordon, Henock Sileshi
"Aphid" (featuring Dijon)	2024	Mika's Laundry	Anna Pollack
"Slug"	2024	Mika's Laundry	Anna Pollack
"Dogfish"	2024	Mika's Laundry	Anna Pollack

List of music videos directed
Title	Year	Album(s)	Director(s)
"New Shoes"	2022	TM	Matt Champion, Onda
"Man on the Moon"	2022	TM	Matt Champion
