= Jane Remover discography =

- Remover performing in November 2025
- Studio albums: 9
- EPs: 4
- Mixtapes: 1
- Singles: 32
- Music videos: 7
- Remixes: 8

The American musician Jane Remover has released nine studio albums, one mixtape, four extended plays, thirty-two singles (including seven as a featured artist), seven music videos, and eight remixes under the names Jane Remover, Leroy, and Venturing. They (Note: Remover is non-binary. This article uses they/them for consistency.) have released three studio albums under their main name, five under Leroy, and one under Venturing. Since 2021, most of Remover's work, excluding releases under Leroy, have been released via DeadAir Records.

Remover began creating digicore music in early 2020. They released their debut EP Teen Week in February 2021. In November 2021, Remover released their debut studio album Frailty through DeadAir. Encompassing multiple genres such as emo, digicore, and glitch pop, it received critical acclaim for its blend of genres and expanded Remover's fanbase. After coming out as a trans woman in 2022, they released their second studio album Census Designated in October 2023, which had influences from shoegaze and post-rock. In April 2025, Remover released their third studio album Revengeseekerz with no prior announcement. It contained influences from digicore and EDM. In August 2025, Remover released the mixtape Indie Rock exclusively on SoundCloud before it was removed quickly after its release. In December 2025, they released the pop-based EP Heart.

Remover has released multiple albums under the pseudonyms Leroy and Venturing. In May 2021, Remover released their first album under Leroy, Dariacore, which was later credited for creating the dariacore microgenre. Continuing under Leroy, they released two sequel albums: Dariacore 2: Enter Here, Hell to the Left (2021) and Dariacore 3... At Least I Think That's What It's Called? (2022). Following the Dariacore trilogy, they released the studio albums Grave Robbing (2023) and Status Update Music (2026). Under Venturing, Remover released Ghostholding on February 2025, which featured avant-rock and indie rock influences. Commercially, Census Designated, Ghostholding, Revengeseekerz, and Heart appeared on the North American College and Community Radio chart, with the latter peaking at number five.

== Studio albums ==
=== As Jane Remover ===
List of studio albums under Jane Remover, with selected chart positions
Title	Album details	Peak chart positions
Title	Album details	NACC
Frailty	Released: November 12, 2021; Label: DeadAir; Formats: LP, CD, cassette, digital download, streaming	—
Census Designated	Released: October 20, 2023; Label: DeadAir; Formats: LP, CD, digital download, streaming	27
Revengeseekerz	Released: April 4, 2025; Label: DeadAir; Formats: LP, CD, digital download, streaming	65

=== As Leroy ===
List of studio albums under Leroy
Title	Album details
Dariacore	Released: May 14, 2021; Label: Self-released; Formats: Digital download, streaming
Dariacore 2: Enter Here, Hell to the Left	Released: September 7, 2021; Label: Self-released; Formats: Digital download, streaming
Dariacore 3... At Least I Think That's What It's Called?	Released: May 23, 2022; Label: Self-released; Formats: Digital download, streaming
Grave Robbing	Released: July 21, 2023; Label: Self-released; Formats: Digital download, streaming
Status Update Music	Released: May 14, 2026; Label: Self-released; Formats: Digital download, streaming

=== As Venturing ===
List of studio albums under Venturing, with selected chart positions
Title	Album details	Peak chart positions
Title	Album details	NACC
Ghostholding	Released: February 14, 2025; Label: DeadAir; Formats: LP, CD, digital download, streaming	23

== Mixtapes ==
=== As Jane Remover ===
List of mixtapes under Jane Remover
Title	Mixtape details
Indie Rock	Released: August 18, 2025 (Note: Remover took the mixtape down shortly after release.); Label: Self-released; Formats: Streaming (SoundCloud)

== Extended plays ==
=== As Jane Remover ===
List of extended plays under Jane Remover, with selected chart positions
Title	EP details	Peak chart positions
Title	EP details	NACC
Teen Week	Released: February 26, 2021; Label: Self-released; Formats: Digital download, streaming	—
Heart	Released: December 5, 2025; Label: DeadAir; Formats: LP, CD, Digital download, streaming	5

=== As Venturing ===
List of extended plays under Venturing
Title	EP details
Arizona	Released: May 19, 2023; Label: Self-released; Formats: Digital download, streaming
Nowhere	Released: July 29, 2026; Label: Self-released; Formats: Digital download, streaming

== Singles ==
=== As Jane Remover ===
List of singles as lead artist under Jane Remover, showing year released and album name
Title	Year	Album
"Me"	2020	Non-album single
"Woodside Gardens 16 December 2012"	2020	Teen Week
"52 Blue Mondays"	2021	Teen Week
"It's a Vicious Cycle"	2021	Non-album single
"How to Lie"	2021	Frailty
"Pretender"	2021	Frailty
"Search Party"	2021	Frailty
"Royal Blue Walls" / "Cage Girl"	2022	Census Designated
"Contingency Song"	2022	Census Designated
"Lips"	2023	Census Designated
"Census Designated"	2023	Census Designated
"Flash in the Pan" / "Dream Sequence"	2024	Heart
"Magic I Want U" / "How to Teleport"	2024	Heart
"JRJRJR"	2025	Revengeseekerz
"Dancing with Your Eyes Closed"	2025	Revengeseekerz
"Supernova" (featuring Funeral)	2025	Non-album single (Note: Though released as a single, "Supernova" is included as a bonus track on physical editions of Revengeseekerz.)
"Dreamflasher" / "Audiostalker" (featuring Lucy Bedroque)	2025	Revengeseekerz (Note: "Audiostalker" is a track from Indie Rock.)
"Music Baby" / "Experimental Skin / How to Teleport" (Leroy Remix)	2026	Non-album single
"Beauty Sleep"	2026	TBA
"Misplace"	2026	Frailty (Deluxe)

==== As featured artist ====
List of singles as featured artist under Jane Remover, showing year released and album name
Title	Year	Album
"If You Make Music .. Stop It" (with Fraxiom)	2020	Non-album single
"Dirt" (with Graveem1nd, C2D, Kaixan, Yyuphoria, Coni Miiura and Kit3)	2021	Non-album single
"Nowhere to Go" (with Juno)	2021	Non-album single
"I Almost Puked at the Mall" (with D0llywood1)	2021	Non-album single
"Pessimist" (with Yyuphoria, D0llywood1, C2D and Tropes)	2021	Non-album single
"Wide Eyes" (with Kmoe and Juno)	2021	Non-album single
"Suave" (with Akriila)	2026	Lucy miró al mundo y notó que está girando

==== Other appearances ====
List of non-single guest appearances under Jane Remover, with other performing artists, showing year released and album name
Title	Year	Album
"Little Peasant" (with Angelus)	2020	Erratus
"Back Off!!!" (with Kmoe and Juno)	2021	All Nighter, Vol. 6
"I Know Something They Don't" (with Juno)	2022	The Loved Ones
"Uncanny Long Arms" (with Underscores)	2023	Wallsocket
"All4U" (with Danny Brown)	2025	Stardust

=== As Venturing ===
List of singles as lead artist under Venturing, showing year released and album name
Title	Year	Album
"Sister"	2024	Ghostholding
"Halloween"	2024	Ghostholding
"Famous Girl"	2024	Ghostholding
"Dead Forever"	2025	Ghostholding
"In the Dark"	2026	Non-album single

== Remixes ==
List of remixes produced by Jane Remover, showing year released and artist name
Title	Year	Artist
"Legend"	2021	Alice Longyu Gao (with Alice Glass)
"Tellmewhatuwant"	2022	Aldn
"Tell Me"	2022	Dazegxd
"Honest"	2022	Umru (with Cecile Believe)
"4Ever"	2022	That Kid (with Bébe Yana)
"Nasty"	2024	Tinashe
"Shake It Like A"	2024	Frost Children (with Danny Brown)
"Calvin Klein"	2025	That Kid

== Music videos ==
List of music videos, showing year released and directors
Song	Year	Director
"Census Designated"	2023	Quadeca
"JRJRJR"	2025	Parker Corey, Jane Remover
"Dancing With Your Eyes Closed"	2025	Noah Sellers, Jane Remover
"Angels in Camo"	2025	Noah Sellers, Jane Remover
"Dreamflasher"	2025	Brendon Burton
"Songs About Leaving"	2026	Jane Remover
"Beauty Sleep"	2026	Brendon Burton

== Songwriting and production credits ==
Songwriting and production credits since the start of the Jane Remover alias in June 2022.

=== EPs ===
Year	Title	Artist(s)
2025	Telephone (Remixes)	Elxnce & Cece Natalie (with Umru)

=== Tracks ===
Year	Title	Artist(s)	Album	Writer(s)	Producer(s)
2022	"No Where"	Xaviersobased	And When	Xaviersobased	Vullny, Jane Remover
2023	"All My Thrills"	Bickle	Biblickle	Tyler McQueary, Ezra Pounds	Bickle, Jane Remover (add.)
2024	"Telephone"	Elxnce and Cece Natalie	Ridgeway Drive / Blurred Sentimentality	Cece Natalie, Jane Remover, Lance Elxnce, Umru Rothenberg	Jane Remover, Elxnce, umru
2024	"Iheartu2"	Kuru	Re:Wired	Kuru	Jane Remover
2024	"Vain"	Ch2rms	Nerves	Ch2rms	Jane Remover, Elxnce
2025	"Lana"	Scottryan	Four	Scottryan	Jane Remover, F4bians
2025	"Desire"	Elxnce	Ridgeway Drive / Blurred Sentimentality	Jane Remover, Lance Elxnce, Will Wiesenfeld	Jane Remover, Elxnce
2025	"Russell" (feat. Funeral)	Scottryan	Non-album single	Funeral, Jane Remover, Scottryan, Billsburyjoeboi	Jane Remover, Billsburyjoeboi
2025	"Forever" (feat. Lucy Bedroque)	Bronclair	Non-album single	Austin Guitar, Jane Remover, Lucy Bedroque	Bronclair, Jane Remover
2026	"Industry Cutthroat"	D0llywood1	ㅤㅤㅤㅤㅤㅤㅤㅤㅤㅤㅤㅤㅤㅤㅤㅤㅤㅤ (Note: EP title consists of 18 invisible characters.)	D0llywood1	Elxnce, Jane Remover
2026	"Whatcha Want 3"	D0llywood1	ㅤㅤㅤㅤㅤㅤㅤㅤㅤㅤㅤㅤㅤㅤㅤㅤㅤㅤ	D0llywood1	Jane Remover
