= Revengeseekerz =

2025 studio album by Jane Remover

Studio album by Jane Remover
- Released: April 4, 2025
- Recorded: September 2024 - February 2025
- Studios: Remover's home, Chicago
- Genres: Digicore; EDM; experimental hip-hop; hyperpop; rage
- Length: 49:26
- Label: DeadAir
- Producer: Jane Remover

Jane Remover chronology
Ghostholding (2025)	Revengeseekerz (2025)	Indie Rock (2025)

Jane Remover studio album chronology
Census Designated (2023)	Revengeseekerz (2025)

Singles from Revengeseekerz
- 1. "JRJRJR" Released: January 1, 2025; 2. "Dancing with Your Eyes Closed" Released: February 26, 2025; 3. "Dreamflasher" Released: September 12, 2025

Revengeseekerz is the third studio album by the American musician Jane Remover. It was released through DeadAir Records on April 4, 2025, as the follow up to their second studio album, Census Designated (2023). Following two earlier, scrapped attempts at a third studio album, it was conceptualized while touring with JPEGMafia on his Lay Down My Life Tour through August and September 2024, and was recorded at their home in Chicago shortly afterwards, concurrently with the album Ghostholding on their side project Venturing, which was released on February 14, 2025. Thematically, Revengeseekerz draws heavily from Remover's experiences with newfound fame, exploring how it impacted their mental health and relationships.

In contrast to the more polished sound of their previous studio album, Revengeseekerz revisits the digicore style of Frailty (2021) while incorporating elements of hip-hop, hyperpop, and house music. The album includes a single guest feature from American rapper Danny Brown. As with their previous two albums, production was handled entirely by Jane Remover. Sonically, the album is characterized by its dense layering of sound effects and samples, many of which reference Remover's earlier work, creating a self-reflexive throughline across the track list.

The project was promoted through three singles—"JRJRJR", "Dancing with Your Eyes Closed" and "Dreamflasher" (the latter backed with the Indie Rock track "Audiostalker", featuring Lucy Bedroque)—as well as two accompanying tours—Turn Up or Die (with Bedroque, D0llywood1, and Dazegxd) and Live Exhibit (with Dazegxd). Around this time, they also served as a supporting act on Turnstile's Never Enough Tour, alongside Speed, Mannequin Pussy, Blood Orange, and Amyl and the Sniffers. Upon its release, Revengeseekerz received widespread critical acclaim from online publications, and it went on to peak at number 65 on the North American College and Community Radio Chart's US & Canadian College Radio Top 100.

== Background and development ==
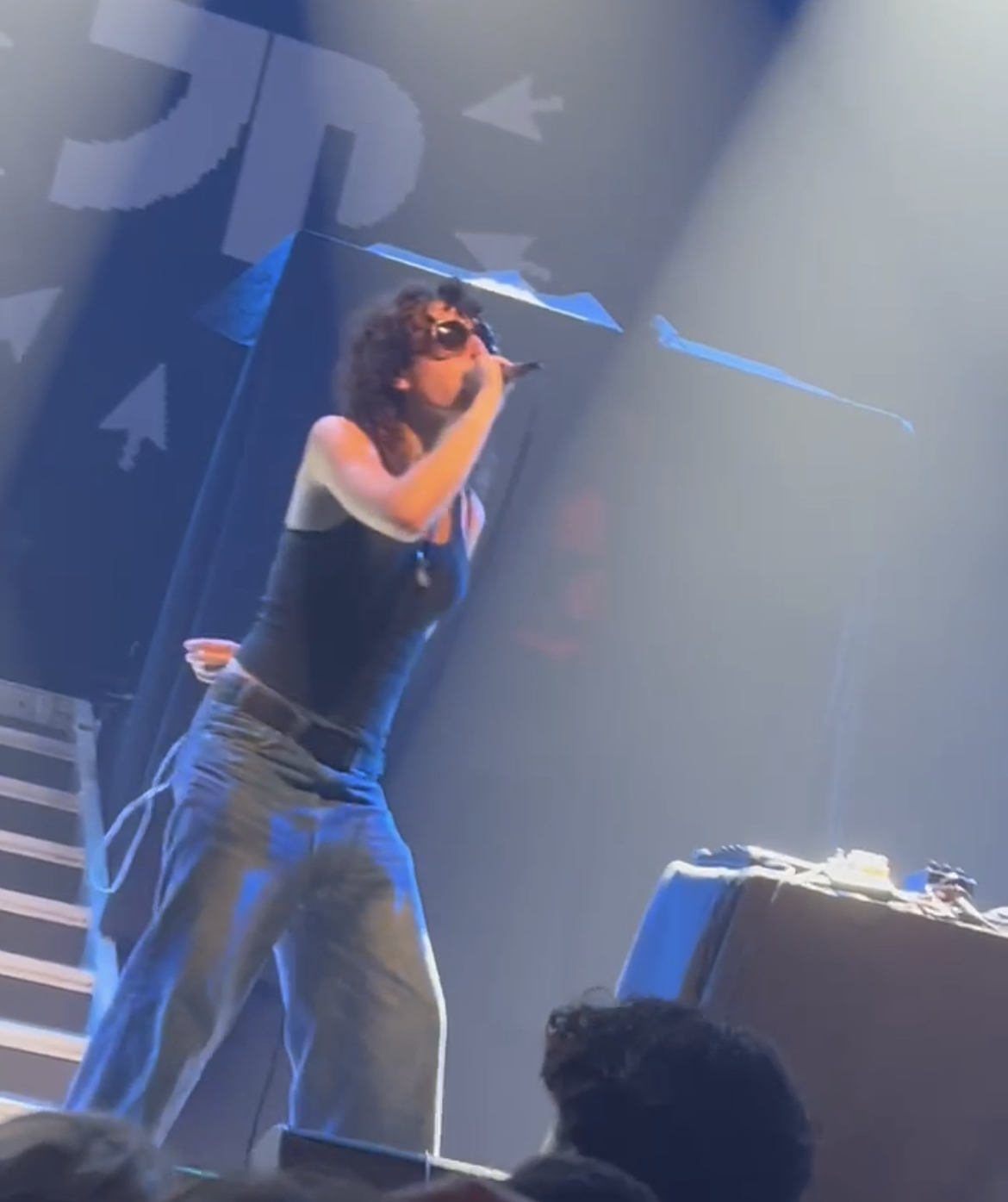
Remover performing as an opening act in JPEGMafia's Lay Down My Life tour in 2024

Jane Remover released their second studio album, Census Designated, in 2023. It received positive reviews from publications such as Pitchfork, The Guardian, and Exclaim!. It was generally described as a shoegaze and post-rock album. In 2024, they released the non-album singles "Flash in the Pan", "Dream Sequence", "Magic I Want U", and "How to Teleport", being left as unfinished tracks that later evolved as the EP Heart when it was released in December 2025. In February 2025, they released their album Ghostholding under the alias Venturing, conceptualized around the same time as Revengeseekerz.

Remover revealed in a January 2025 Billboard interview that they recorded an 18-track album containing the previously released singles throughout the summer of 2024 but scrapped it in favor of the sound on Revengeseekerz. They conceptualized the album while opening for JPEGMafia on his Lay Down My Life Tour, beginning work on it in September 2024 upon the tour's completion, fueled by an experience in which maggots had infested their refrigerator due to their power bill failing to be paid while on tour. They couch surfed for a week before returning home to work on the album once the infestation had been taken care of.

In an interview with NPR, Remover predicted that "whatever comes next" after Census Designated would be a sharp contrast. After Remover's leg on JPEGMafia's Lay Down My Life tour, they wrote "JRJRJR" on September 28, 2024, being the only track finished for three months at the time. As Remover started when beginning production on Revengeseekerz, "physically and career wise, I was so hungry." At the time the production of Revengeseekerz began, it was Remover's third attempt at making their third studio album. The album's production began in October 2024 and concluded in February 2025. According to Remover, each track was made during one or two studio sessions.

Revengeseekerz' title is influenced by Kill Bill: Volume 1, Remover's favorite film. Another influence of the album is electronic music project Machine Girl's ...Because I'm Young Arrogant and Hate Everything You Stand For (2017). Remover's themes of retributory violence connect to "Movies for Guys" from their debut album Frailty, where they narrate taking glass shards to an offender and watching television as they bleed out on the sidewalk. This is reflected in multiple tracks from Revengeseekerz: "Angels in Camo" opens with "Dear God, place a curse on those who wronged me"; "Turn Up or Die" includes "Give death bitches proper sendoff. Explosive bitch, blow his head off," and "Experimental Skin" includes "I wanna sin, blow the city up."

== Composition ==
=== Overview ===
"Dreamflasher"
"Dreamflasher" is an example of Remover's meticulous, abrasive digicore-based production with distortion and various samples, as the track reflects their music success.

Revengeseekerz is a digicore album, with elements of EDM, experimental hip-hop, house, hyperpop, industrial hip-hop, and rage. Marked as a departure from Census Designated's shoegaze and post-rock sound and a return to the genre since Frailty, it is nearly 50 minutes long and there are twelve tracks on the album. The album's concept is based on Remover dealing with their newfound fame and how it affected their mental health and relationship with others. Being self-referential, almost each track samples Remover's previous music they produced. Danny Brown is the only guest artist on the album, being featured on "Psychoboost".

The album has an extensive collection of sound effects sampled, including battle announcers from Pokémon Wii games, Japanese animated apocalyptic science fiction film The End of Evangelion, a Guitar Hero iOS game, dialogue from Duke Nukem, a PBS series, teen supernatural horror film The Craft, a Sonic fan game, and voice lines from Mario & Sonic at the Olympic Games. Several songs sample tracks Remover produced in the past, as well as their side projects and production work for other digicore artists.

Matt Mitchel of Paste described the album as a 12-track, "self-referential tornado" that explores a maximalist soundscape, blending elements of techno, EDM, and hyperpop while transforming micro-genres into its own experimental playground. In terms of production, Remover considers Revengeseekerz to be closer to Frailty than Census Designated, with the involvement of EDM. They consider it to be a "blind rage" album, explaining it as based on people who "wronged" them. Remover played guitar in seven out of twelve tracks.

=== Tracks ===
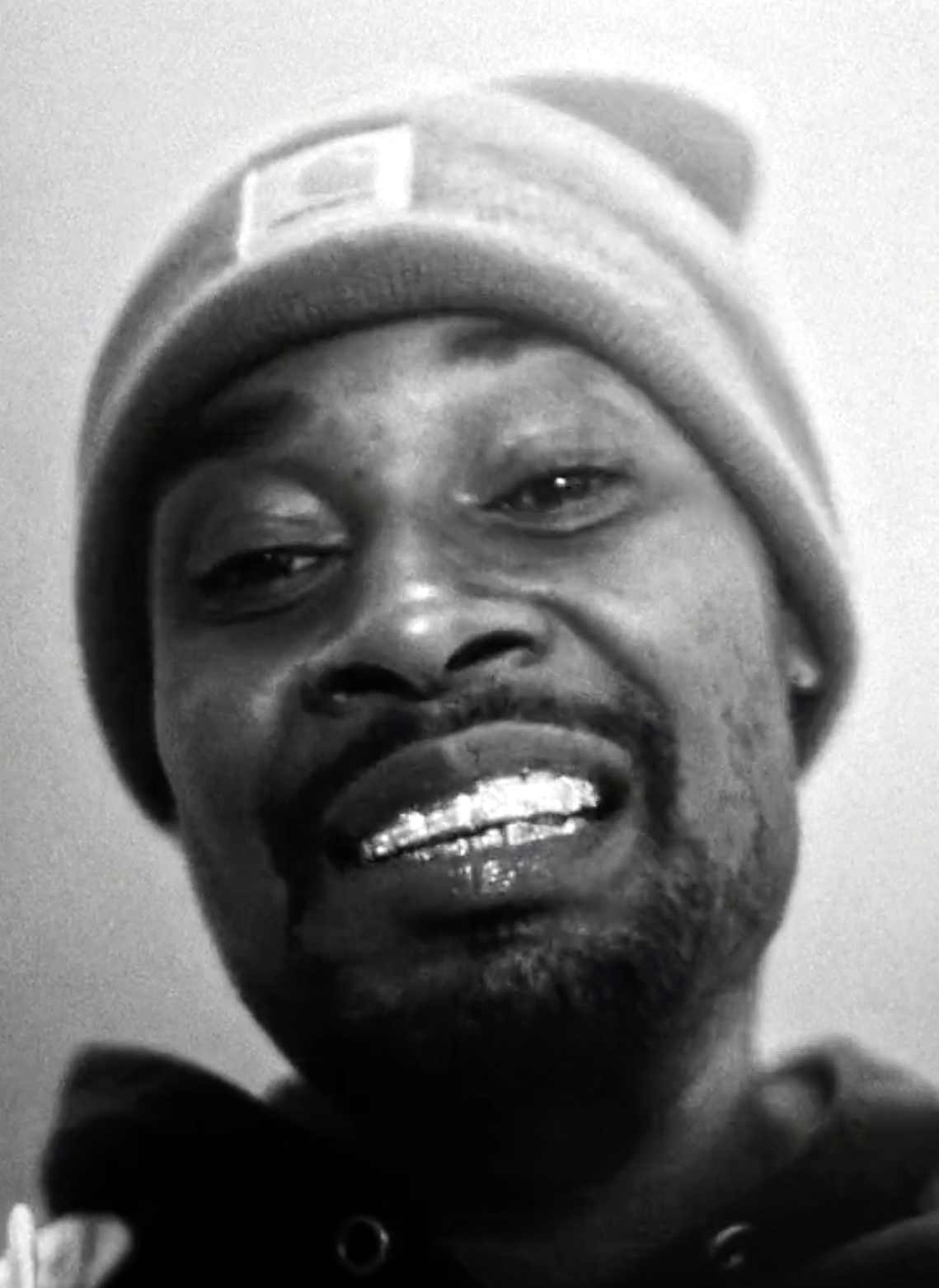
Danny Brown (pictured in 2017) is featured in the track "Psychoboost".

The opening track, "Twice Removed", beginning with a sample reminiscent of a video game loading, is layered with booming 808s, stuttering synths, Auto-Tune vocals, glitch sounds, skittering percussions, and various sound effects and samples, all elements that highlight the rest of Revengeseekerz sonically. Unlike their past work, Remover makes hedonistic and braggadocio references, for example, "Shit was 03. 03 Bitch, I'm Avril Lavigne." "Psychoboost" is a techno and dubstep track that features Danny Brown as a guest artist under high levels of distortion, where Remover reflects feelings of desire and dysphoria.

"Star People" is a lush experimental hip hop track that takes a jerk-influenced tone loaded with "cacophonous sounds and layers." Inspired by George Michael's "Star People", the track tones down in its second half with melodic vocals and guitar lines. In its 90-second outro, vocalizations, broken glass sounds, and "fluttering bloops of fainty distorting synths" are featured. "Experimental Skin", a noise rock-adjacent track, features Remover referring to themselves "as a shapeshifter of sorts" under an EDM beat. "Angels in Camo", opening with a "heavenly stutter-choir," has a hypertrap influence. "Dreamflasher", opens with a yawning harmonica and shows Remover lyrically on their success from their music, with people screaming their name and finding love from one who matters to them.

"Turn Up or Die" begins with distorted kicks reminiscent of hardstyle music and evolves into a dubstep drop, incorporating extensive atmospheric techno samples. "Dancing with Your Eyes Closed" is a hyperpop and house track featuring "videogame-like synth against a pulsing backbeat", and a "squishy, danceable, electropop grooves" with denser production. "Fadeoutz" contrasts the album's sounds, adopting a softer approach to the guitar lines and vocal melodies, while detailing Remover's areas of weakness. "Professional Vengeance", shows Remover's "own take on a quirky teeny bopper hit," but is layered with various video game sounds, then "deep fried in the FL Studio multitrack." "Dark Night Castle", contains string layers and stuttering piano lines. "Fadeoutz" and "Dark Night Castle" are both influenced by "techno-shaped post-hardcore." The final track, "JRJRJR", shows Remover dealing with struggles with their past music, fanbase, and themselves while sampling their previous music. Sonically, it is a hyperpop and rage track.

== Artwork ==
The album artwork for Revengeseekerz displays Remover kneeling with a cigarette in their mouth, while pressing a burning katana onto the ground. The album art was photographed in January 2025 during a photoshoot by Brendon Burton in Oxnard, California. During the photoshoot, Remover explained that a flame was used for roughly three seconds in each shot, resulting in their hair catching fire around fifty times. Some of the final images show visible signs of singed hair from the repeated burns. Remover later recalled arriving at a restaurant after the shoot and realizing they still smelled strongly of butane from the flames. In an interview with Our Generation Music, Remover said that they had lost the katana after their house was robbed.

== Promotion and release ==
Remover released the lead single, "JRJRJR" and an accompanying music video co-directed by Parker Corey, on January 1, 2025 without prior announcement. That same day, they also announced Revengeseekerz without specifying a release date. A second single, "Dancing with Your Eyes Closed", was released on February 26, 2025, with an accompanying music video co-directed by Noah Sellers. The track list was revealed on March 28. Revengeseekerz was surprise-released on April 4, 2025, alongside a music video for "Angels in Camo," co-directed by Noah Sellers. In the wrap up of their Turn Up or Die Tour, Remover released "Supernova" as a single on May 22, 2025, which was previously exclusive to its CD release and features rapper Funeral. The third single, "Dreamflasher", was released with an accompanying music video on September 12, 2025. The single's B-side is "Audiostalker" featuring Lucy Bedroque, initially in Remover's mixtape Indie Rock, released less than a month prior.

Throughout April and May 2025, they embarked on the Turn Up or Die Tour across the United States and Canada. In June 2025, Remover was announced as one of the opening acts for the North American leg of Turnstile's Never Enough Tour alongside Amyl and the Sniffers, Speed, Mannequin Pussy, and Blood Orange, which took place throughout September and October 2025. Remover also performed at the Fuji Rock Festival and Lollapalooza that year. In April 2026, they announced the North America leg of their Live Exhibit tour, which began on June 4, in New York and is concluded on October 7, in Seattle. The European leg of the tour was later announced in June, which began on August 15, in Gothernberg and concluded on August 29, in Reading, with Dazegxd serving as the opening act.

== Critical reception ==
Professional ratings
Review scores
Source	Rating
laut.de	5/5 stars
The Needle Drop	9/10 (Note: Specifically, Fantano rated the album a "light to decent 9".)
Paste	9.1/10
Pitchfork	8.0/10

Revengeseekerz received critical acclaim. Anthony Fantano of The Needle Drop gave the album a "light to decent 9" out of 10, praising its production and its songwriting for being able to "shine through all the chaos." Kieran Press-Reynolds of Pitchfork described the album as "some of the most all-out intense music [Jane Remover has] ever made". Press-Reynolds highlighted "Dark Night Castle" as a moment of "unhurried beauty", and stated that "Experimental Skin" sounded like Remover "recorded the song and then let five DJs tweak it out by jitter-clicking every button at once". He also felt that what made the songs on Revengeseekerz work so well is that they are "so carefully composed, so intentional, that every cyborgian burp and steel snare fits perfectly".

Matt Mitchell of Paste found Revengeseekerz to be Remover's "most straight-forward" album to date and stated that on the album Remover "presents a complicated, scornful world". Mitchell highlighted "annihilating techno blade against pitch-shifting vocals" on "Psychoboost", "gauzy, compressed melodies" on "Turn Up or Die", and "sweet vocalizations" on the outro of "Star People". He also described "JRJRJR" as "textbook Jane Remover", as well as naming "Professional Vengeance" as the tightest track on the album.

Mirco Leier of the German online magazine laut.de praised Revengeseekerz, writing that Remover demonstrates production skills in a league of their own. He noted that the album's sound design feels deliberate and cohesive, with each sample—no matter how obscure—seamlessly integrated into the overall mix. According to Leier, the record balances "bulldozer EDM drops", euphoric pop hooks, and inventive guitar-driven moments without any element overpowering another. He concluded that, while the album's brilliance may take time to fully reveal itself, each track ultimately becomes greater than the sum of its parts.

Year-end list rankings

Year‑end lists
Publication	List	Rank	Ref.
Alternative Press	50 Best Albums of 2025	—N/a	
Dazed	The 20 Best Albums of 2025, Ranked	19	
Dork	Dork's Albums of the Year 2025	94	
The Needle Drop	Top 50 Albums of 2025	6	
Paste	The 50 Best Albums of 2025	29	
Slant Magazine	The 50 Best Albums of 2025	9	
Stereogum	The 50 Best Albums Of 2025	15	
Vogue	The 45 Best Albums of 2025	—N/a	

== Track listing ==
Standard edition
No.	Title	Length
1.	"Twice Removed"	3:59
2.	"Psychoboost" (featuring Danny Brown)	4:04
3.	"Star People"	4:19
4.	"Experimental Skin"	5:00
5.	"Angels in Camo"	3:41
6.	"Dreamflasher"	3:44
7.	"Turn Up or Die"	4:41
8.	"Dancing with Your Eyes Closed"	3:50
9.	"Fadeoutz"	3:20
10.	"Professional Vengeance"	3:56
11.	"Dark Night Castle"	4:18
12.	"JRJRJR"	4:28
Total length:		49:26

Physical edition
No.	Title	Length
13.	"Supernova" (featuring Funeral)	3:04
Total length:		52:30

=== Notes ===
- "Twice Removed" and "Turn Up or Die" are stylized in all caps. "Angels in Camo" is stylized in all lowercase. "Experimental Skin" and "Professional Vengeance" are stylized in title case. All other tracks are stylized in sentence case.
- "Psychoboost" is printed as "Psychoboost feat danny brown".
- "Supernova" is released as a single on streaming platforms.

== Personnel ==
Credits were adapted from Tidal and Paper.

- Jane Remover – songwriting and production
- Danny Brown – vocals (2)
- Brendon Burton – artwork design, photography

== Charts ==
Chart (2025)	Peak position
US & Canadian College Radio Top 200 (NACC)	65
