= Dancing with Your Eyes Closed =

2025 single by Jane Remover

Single by Jane Remover

from the album Revengeseekerz
- Released: February 26, 2025
- Recorded: October 2024 – February 2025
- Genre: Digicore
- Length: 3:50
- Label: DeadAir
- Songwriter: Jane Remover
- Producer: Jane Remover

Jane Remover singles chronology
"JRJRJR" (2025)	"Dancing with Your Eyes Closed" (2025)	"Supernova" (2025)

"Dancing with Your Eyes Closed" is a song by the American musician Jane Remover from their third studio album, Revengeseekerz (2025). It was released by deadAir Records on February 26, 2025, as the album's second single. Remover wrote, produced, mixed, and performed the track.

Music critics identified "Dancing with Your Eyes Closed" as being a digicore song driven by a booming four on the floor beat and breakdowns that make Remover's vocals turn near-incomprehensible. Its lyrics have anti-capitalist undertones that highlight Remover's expression of humanity on the track. The song was positively received by music critics, several of whom deemed it one of the best tracks of its release week. A music video co-directed by Remover and Noah Sellers accompanied the single's release and depicts Remover in the center of a filled party in a warehouse.

== Background and release ==
Jane Remover began conceptualizing their third album, Revengeseekerz, while opening for JPEGMafia on his Lay Down My Life Tour, beginning work on it in September 2024 upon the tour's completion. As they began production on the album, "physically and career wise, I was so hungry". The album's production began in October 2024 and concluded in February 2025.

On January 1, 2025, Remover announced Revengeseekerz, alongside the release of its lead single, "JRJRJR". On February 14, Ghostholding, their debut album under the moniker Venturing, was released. On February 24, Remover announced the second single for Revengeseekerz, "Dancing with Your Eyes Closed", which was released by DeadAir Records two days later. On April 4, the album was released with no prior announcement, where "Dancing with Your Eyes Closed" appears as its eighth track.

== Composition ==
"Dancing with Your Eyes Closed"
"Dancing with Your Eyes Closed" blends elements of glitch music and hyperpop with high levels of distortion that help define Remover's sound from Revengeseekerz.

"Dancing with Your Eyes Closed" is 3 minutes and 50 seconds long. It was written, produced, mixed, and performed by Remover. It is a digicore song with a booming four on the floor beat. The instrumental also features breakdowns, in which Remover's voice becomes near-incomprehensible. The song's lyrics contain anti-capitalist undertones and highlight Remover's expression of humanity on the track.

Derrick Rossignol for Uproxx observed that the track's sound went back to Remover's stylistic origins, while Will Shube of Flood Magazine and Neville Hardman of Alternative Press wrote that it departed from the shoegaze sound of Remover's second album, Census Designated (2023). Konstantinos Pappis from Our Culture Mag described the track as "hard-hitting" and "clubby"; similarly, Abby Jones for Stereogum said it sees Remover "at [their] clubbiest". Schube said the track is "dancefloor-obsessed", while Hardman said the track starts as a "glitched-out rave" that ends in a "wicked hangover".

== Critical reception ==
For Uproxx, Rossignol named "Dancing with Your Eyes Closed" one of the best tracks of its release week; he called it a "real blast from the past that's also absolutely welcome in 2025". John Norris of Paper felt that, along with "JRJRJR", the song was easier to consume for listeners compared to other songs from Revengeseekerz. He also called it an "infectious club banger". Matt Mitchell from Paste wrote that the song "isn't just party music that'll break the queue, it's party music built like a sanctuary". The staff of Paste included it in their list of notable songs from its release week; the staff at Alternative Press named it one of the best tracks of its release week.

== Music video ==
The music video for "Dancing with Your Eyes Closed" was co-directed by Remover and Noah Sellers. The video begins with a strobe warning and depicts Remover in the center of a packed party in a warehouse. They are shown navigating the chaotic setting by "losing themselves in the chaos", drinking from a bottle, and singing in pajamas while standing on a mattress. Matthew Strauss of Pitchfork called the video "high-intensity".
