= JRJRJR =

2025 single by Jane Remover

Single by Jane Remover

from the album Revengeseekerz
- Released: January 1, 2025
- Recorded: September 28, 2024
- Studio: Remover's home (Chicago)
- Genre: Hyperpop; hip-hop; digicore
- Length: 4:28
- Label: DeadAir
- Songwriter: Jane Remover
- Producer: Jane Remover

Jane Remover singles chronology
"Magic I Want U" / "How to Teleport" (2024)	"JRJRJR" (2025)	"Dancing with Your Eyes Closed" (2025)

"JRJRJR" is a song by the American musician Jane Remover from their third studio album, Revengeseekerz (2025). It was released by deadAir Records on January 1, 2025, as the album's lead single. The song was written in 30 minutes in a green room while Remover was on tour with JPEGMafia. After returning home to Chicago from touring in September 2024, they recorded the track in one day. Remover wrote, performed, produced, and mixed the song.

Music critics identified "JRJRJR" as being a hyperpop, hip-hop, and digicore song, while being influenced by multiple other genres. The track is driven by synthesizers and an abrasive hip-hop beat switching between trap beats and hyperpop sonics. In its lyrics, Remover discusses self-doubt and self-perception, specifically considering changing their face, name, and city. Music critics enjoyed "JRJRJR" for returning to Remover's digicore sound but felt it was overlong. A music video co-directed by Parker Corey of By Storm accompanied the single's release and depicts Remover in all-black outfits carrying a firearm, smoking a cigarette, and waving a white flag.

== Background, release, and production ==
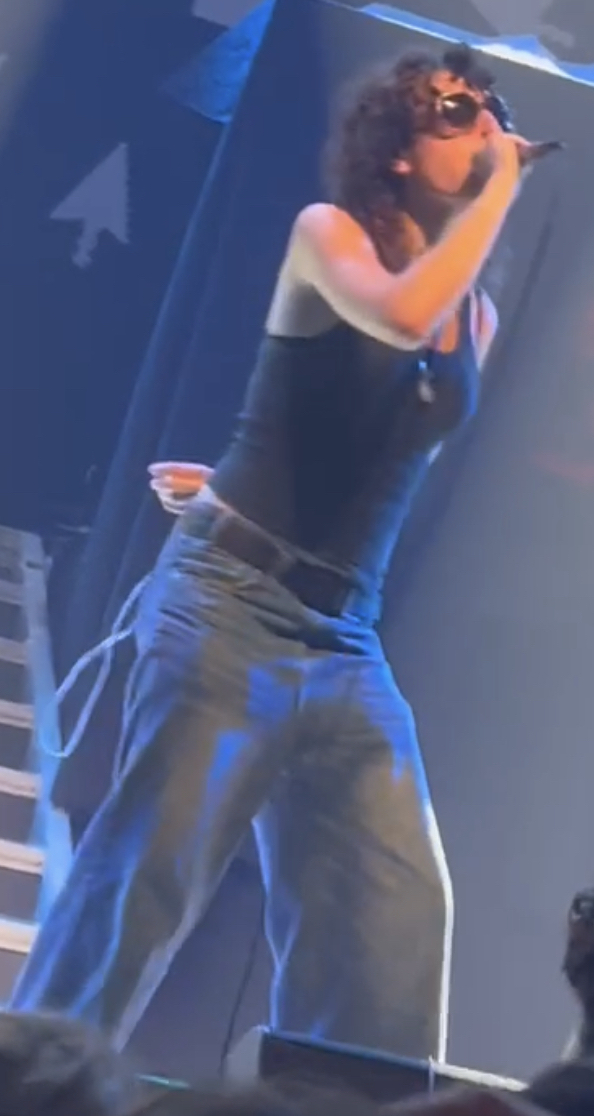
Remover wrote "JRJRJR" in a green room while on tour with JPEGMafia.

Following the release of their second album, Census Designated, in October 2023, Jane Remover released the tracks "Flash in the Pan" and "Dream Sequence" in July 2024. These were followed by "Magic I Want U" and "How to Teleport" that September. The songs were intended for an album recorded by Remover in 2024; they decided not to release it, stating that it would have turned them into the "main pop girl", which they did not want. On January 1, 2025, they announced their third album, Revengeseekerz, alongside the release of its lead single, "JRJRJR". They decided to release the song on New Year's Day with the intention to "shake listeners awake". In the album's track list, "JRJRJR" appears as its 12th and final track.

"JRJRJR" was written by Remover in a green room in 30 minutes while on tour with JPEGMafia. They composed the song to match the exact sound they imagined during its creation. They returned to their home in Chicago on September 25, 2024, and recorded "JRJRJR" three days later. It was the first song Remover recorded for Revengeseekerz and remained the only song completed for the album for three months after its creation. Since its creation, they knew the song would be the album's closer; they found it humorous for the album's lead single to also be its final track. They described the song, along with the album single "Dancing with Your Eyes Closed", as "appetizers" for the rest of the album. Alongside songwriting, Remover also performed, produced, and mixed the song.

== Music and lyrics ==
"JRJRJR"
"JRJRJR" switches between elements of hip-hop, trap, and hyperpop in its production; its lyrics showcase Remover considering changing their face, name, and city.

"JRJRJR" is 4 minutes and 28 seconds long. It is a hyperpop, hip-hop, and digicore song that has also been described by music journalists as being or containing elements of rage, pop, and experimental electronic music. Matt Mitchell of Paste said it is "so non-categorical that your best bet is to just call it what it is: 'JRJRJR'." Multiple critics observed it as moving away from the shoegaze sound of Census Designated. The song begins with a stuttered sample saying the letter "J", which is cut off before it can be completed. The song is driven by synthesizers, containing an abrasive hip-hop beat and switching between trap beats and hyperpop sonics. Its instrumental samples the song "Homeswitcher" from Remover's 2021 extended play (EP) Teen Week.

"JRJRJR" contains six verses. Its lyrics showcase Remover discussing self-doubt and self-perception, specifically considering changing their face, name, and city. In one of its lines, Remover complains that their current name "rolls off the tongue" too easily, while in another they loathe about their previous music, singing, "Rehearsing songs I hate in Silver Lake trying not to cry." In other lines, Remover compares themselves to "Jesus in the mosh pit", starting over, being unbothered about having "no brothers, no sisters", and losing trust in the people they know: "I don't believe a single soul no more, not even you." As the song goes on, the lyrics present closure—they screech "I do whatever the fuck 'cause I've been whatever the fuck" using Auto-Tune—as well as skepticism: "Girls like me get to be lucky." Jordan Darville from The Fader viewed the former lyric as referencing Remover's "unpredictable genre collisions [and] messy personal life they detail in the song's lyrics".

Discussing "JRJRJR" for Stereogum, Chris DeVille called it a "noise-strewn track" and an "exercise in sensory overload"; similarly, Joshua Pickard from Beats Per Minute called it a "noisy beast, primed to overload your senses and burrow deep into your nervous system". Mitchell said it "tugs at the threads of Frailty and Census Designated" and observed its electronica sounds wear away "in heavy strains of rap chaos". He also described its lyrics as a "blown-out brag and lament for trans life". Kieran Press-Reynolds for Pitchfork said the song's music "convulses like a power plant in the early stages of implosion" and called the song itself a "taunt" due to the fact Remover "can't be bound to a genre, a scene, a geographic location, or even a name". For the same website, Sam Goldner said it "operates in a world where Sisso and Klein teamed up to co-produce A Great Chaos" and "embrac[es] the anything-goes, exploded hip-hop of their digicore days".

== Critical reception ==
"JRJRJR" was awarded the "Best New Track" accolade from Pitchfork. Goldner called it Remover's "most maximalist yet most direct music yet"; he felt its runtime was too long but attributed it to the fact that "changing your whole world takes time". Hattie Lindert of Resident Advisor called the track a "howling lead single" and likened its New Year's Day release date to an alarm bell. In a review of Revengeseekerz for Paste, Mitchell lauded it for being "a digicore enmeshment of everything Jane Remover does so well" and said it "might give you whiplash". The staff at both Paste and The Fader considered it one of the best songs of its release week. For the latter magazine, Darville hailed it as a "remarkably successful bottling of the ambivalence that fuels Jane Remover's music". A writer for the same magazine called the song a "great single" that is "more frenzied than anything [Remover has] released in a minute". Konstantinos Pappis for Our Culture Mag deemed "JRJRJR" one of the best songs of January 2025; he said Remover "blows up the whole idea of 'new year, new me'" on the track. He thought its runtime was overlong, but concluded by writing that "'JRJRJR' is a song [he] can't help but go back to".

Pitchfork named "JRJRJR" the 47th best track of 2025 in their year-end list; Benny Sun described it as the "centerpiece" of Revengeseekerz and said it consisted of a "wall of distortion and stream-of-consciousness raps".

== Music video ==
"JRJRJR" was released alongside a music video co-directed by Parker Corey of Injury Reserve. In contrast to their previous commissioned visuals, Remover handled the video's editing process. The video depicts Remover in all-black outfits carrying a gun, smoking a cigarette, and waving a white flag. The video also features distorted camcorder footage and Gothic text. In the video, Remover is also seen wearing a Hood By Air jacket. Liam Hess of Vogue said Corey and Remover created a "time-warp aesthetic universe" with the video.
