= Contingency Song =

2022 single by Jane Remover

Single by Jane Remover

from the album Census Designated
- Released: November 16, 2022
- Genre: Shoegaze; drone
- Length: 6:31 (single version); 6:26 (album version)
- Label: DeadAir
- Songwriter: Jane Remover
- Producer: Jane Remover

Jane Remover singles chronology
"Royal Blue Walls" / "Cage Girl" (2022)	"Contingency Song" (2022)	"Lips" (2023)

"Contingency Song" is a song by the American musician Jane Remover. It was first released as a single by DeadAir Records on November 16, 2022. The song was remastered for Remover's second studio album, Census Designated (2023). The two versions of the song differ in length and production. Remover wrote and produced the songs; they mixed the album version, while the single and album versions were mastered by Zeroh and Hector Vega, respectively.

"Contingency Song" is a ballad in the shoegaze and drone genres, built around a persistent buzz, slowed-down sounds of sirens, and howling wind. The lyrics are about a collapsing romantic relationship, self-harm, and the apocalypse. Over the course of the song, the instrumental grows in intensity until it conceals Remover's vocals and ends in near-silence. Music critics praised "Contingency Song" for its atmospheric shoegaze production.

== Background and release ==
In June 2022, Jane Remover came out as a trans woman, announced their (Note: Remover has no pronoun preference. This article uses they/them pronouns for consistency.) new stage name, and released the songs "Royal Blue Walls", "Cage Girl", and "Contingency Song" through DeadAir Records. "Contingency Song" was made available on November 16, 2022, alongside a reissue of Remover's debut studio album, Frailty (2021), and an announcement of their first merchandise line. In a press release, Remover described the song's themes as: "Preparing for eventual doomsday. Flirting with death. Finding a difference between being dependent and being selfish."

On August 23, 2023, Remover announced their second studio album, Census Designated. They also revealed the album's track listing on the same day, which included both "Cage Girl" and "Contingency Song". DeadAir Records released Census Designated on October 20; "Contingency Song" appears as its tenth and final track. Remover stated that since the song's creation, they knew it would be the album's final track. As Remover wanted the album to sound as if it were going from dusk to dawn, they felt "Contingency Song" was able to represent dawn; in their words: "'Contingency Song' ends when the sun goes up."

== Composition ==
The album version of "Contingency Song" differs from the single version. The album version is 6 minutes and 26 seconds long, while the single version is 5 seconds longer. Remover wrote and produced both versions; they mixed the album version, while the single and album versions were mastered by Zeroh and Hector Vega, respectively. "Contingency Song" is a ballad in the shoegaze and drone genres. It contains no drums and is built around a persistent buzz, slowed-down sounds of sirens, and howling wind. The instrumental gradually intensifies throughout most of the track until it conceals Remover's vocals and ends in near-silence.

Lyrically, "Contingency Song" is based around themes of the apocalypse and the collapse of a romantic relationship ("I said I'm not in love / Please don't hurt me"), as well as images of self-harm ("I pour the boiling water on my hand / I still feel enough to touch myself"). Pitchfork's Allison Harris compared the latter line to similar lyrics from the song "Ditch a Body in the Laundry" (2016) by Laura Les and wrote that "Contingency Song" has "the liminal atmosphere of an airport terminal" and a "gloomy climate". In a review of Census Designated for the same website, Kieran Press-Reynolds thought that the track has a "sparse winter horizon". Madelyn Dawson of Paste called "Contingency Song" a "brooding final track" for Census Designated.

== Critical reception ==
Upon its release, "Contingency Song" received positive reviews from music critics. Chris DeVille of Stereogum dubbed it a "phenomenal shoegaze ballad of sorts" and praised how the song builds up smoothly and without losing momentum. Harris similarly complimented the atmospheric production and the way the song progressed. Raphael Helfand from The Fader selected "Contingency Song" as a "Song You Need". He felt the song was reminiscent of musical acts such as A.R. Kane and My Bloody Valentine, but its drum-less production and departure from the traditional rock and roll song structure of those bands "obliterates any premature allegations of pastiche" for Remover. Brady Brickner-Wood of the same magazine identified it as one of the standout tracks showcasing Remover's artistic reinvention away from bitcrushed electronic music and toward a shoegaze-influenced sound with clean electric guitars. The staff at BrooklynVegan listed "Contingency Song" as one of their favorite tracks of its release week.

== Personnel ==
Credits are adapted from Bandcamp and the liner notes of Census Designated.

- Jane Remover – songwriting, production, mixing (album version)
- Zeroh – mastering (single version)
- Hector Vega – mastering (album version)
