= Heart (EP) =

2025 EP by Jane Remover

EP by Jane Remover
- Released: December 5, 2025
- Recorded: April–August 2024
- Genre: Pop
- Length: 26:51
- Label: DeadAir
- Producer: Jane Remover

Jane Remover chronology
Indie Rock (2025)	Heart (2025)	Status Update Music (2026)

Singles from Heart
- 1. "Flash in the Pan / Dream Sequence" Released: July 31, 2024; 2. "Magic I Want U / How to Teleport" Released: September 4, 2024

Heart (stylized as ♡) is the second extended play (EP) by the American musician Jane Remover. It was released without prior announcement by DeadAir Records on December 5, 2025. It is a 6-track EP that contains Remover's two double-singles from 2024 with two additional tracks. The name of the album is represented in writing and on the cover as an ideogram of a heart (♡), instead of the word in Latin script.

All tracks from the EP were intended for a third studio album before being scrapped in favor of Revengeseekerz and Ghostholding (under the side project Venturing), as Remover felt like it would trap them (Note: Remover uses they/them pronouns.) into a "main pop girl" image. Following the releases of their two albums in 2025, Remover returned to the scrapped project under the name Heart, mixing tracks they recorded during mid-2024. The EP received critical acclaim from Pitchfork and The Hoya, was included in a "15 best EPs of 2025" list by a Paste editor, and peaked at number five on the North American College and Community Radio Chart (NACC). In promotion of Heart, Remover is embarking on the Live Exhibit Tour, which began in June 2026 and is set to conclude in October.

== Background ==
On July 31, 2024, Remover released two songs: "Flash in the Pan" and "Dream Sequence". "Magic I Want U" and "How to Teleport" followed on September 4, intended for a full-length album scrapped by Remover; they stated it would have turned them into the "main pop girl", which they did not want. Throughout 2025, Remover released the albums Ghostholding (under the alias Venturing) and Revengeseekerz; the latter of which they supported with a tour.

== Composition ==
=== Overview ===
Heart is a pop EP that distances from the "rage-dance bombast" of Revengeseekerz and "guitar drones" of Ghostholding. At a runtime of twenty-six minutes and fifty seconds, more than half of the EP's tracks are fixed versions of old materials, including "Magic I Want U", "Flash in the Pan", and an extended "How to Teleport". Outside of that, the only modifications were a replaced sample and a "tiny coda". The EP was recorded from April to August 2024. From July to November 2025, "How to Teleport?" was extended and mixed, whilst on the last month of production, "So What?", "Magic I Want U", and "Music Baby" were mixed.

=== Tracks ===
"Flash in the Pan"
"Flash in the Pan" is a blend of sexy drill and alternative R&B with a shoegaze influence based on Remover's hints of insecurity under a braggadocious theme.

The first track, "Magic I Want U", uses "euphoric" synths and VST guitars akin to "buzzy pop" peers including Underscores and Quadeca, written about a crush Remover had on another musician and sexual desire. The second track, "So What?", is a bedroom R&B track built on a "romantic Jersey club groove" that explodes into "chaotic shards of breakbeats", "glittering acoustic guitars", "siren-squeals", and "atomized robo-voices". The third track, "Music Baby", shows Remover's romantic take on "pulsing, pounding Euro-club music" alongside "digital boops and beeps", bridging the soft first half with the second half's club-driven sound.

The fourth track, "Flash in the Pan", initially a Britney Spears cover, is a sexy drill and alternative R&B track with "light distorted guitars" akin to digital shoegaze. The track is considered "braggadocious and proud" while containing deeper hints of insecurity, such as "I know how bad you wanna scream my name." The fifth track, "How to Teleport", is a reggaeton-influence track with Bachata percussion including a "galloping hi-hat". On the EP, it is an extended version. The sixth and final track, "Dream Sequence", is somber dream rock track containing "dreamy crescendos and guttural screams of passion" which was a reworked track from their side project Venturing.

== Release and reception ==
Professional ratings
Review scores
Source	Rating
The Hoya	5/5 stars
Pitchfork	7.6/10

On December 2, 2025, Remover announced their new single, "So What?", to release on Friday. On December 5, it was released as an EP by DeadAir Records without prior announcement, containing four singles Remover released in 2024 along with two new additional tracks "So What?" and "Music Baby". In a press release, Remover described the EP as "dancing with tears in your eyes" while drunk with friends "on a summer night". In written form and on the cover artwork, the album's title appears as a heart ideogram (♡) instead of being written with Latin letters.

Heart received critical acclaim from music critics, including a positive review from Benny Sum of Pitchfork, describing it as "full of delicious moments" that bite "into a rich chocolate-covered strawberry". Juan P. Almanza of The Hoya considered the EP to be Remover's most engaging work that rivals their breakout album Revengeseekerz. Matt Mitchell of Paste ranked the EP at number five on "the 15 best EPs of 2025" and especially complimented the song "Music Baby". The EP peaked at number five on the North American College and Community Radio Chart (NACC), dated March 3, 2026. Heart was supported with the Live Exhibit tour, which began on June 4, in New York and concluded on October 7, in Seattle, with Dazegxd serving as the opening act.

== Track listing ==
All tracks are written and produced by Jane Remover, excluding "Flash in the Pan" and "Dream Sequence", co-produced by Heba Kadry.

No.	Title	Length
1.	"Magic I Want U"	4:58
2.	"So What?"	4:06
3.	"Music Baby"	5:21
4.	"Flash in the Pan"	3:43
5.	"How to Teleport"	4:33
6.	"Dream Sequence"	4:10
Total length:		26:51

== Personnel ==
Credits were adapted from Tidal and Bandcamp.

- Jane Remover – vocals, songwriting, production
- Heba Kadry – production (4, 6)
- Mario Dante – artwork design, photography

== Charts ==
Chart (2026)	Peak position
US & Canadian College Radio Top 200 (NACC)	5
