= Ruby Bones =

American rock band

- Ruby Bones

Background information
- Origin: New Jersey, U.S.
- Genres: Rock, indie rock
- Years active: 2015–present
- Label: Mint 400 Records
- Members: Matt Cohen; Chris Fox; James Janocha; Eric Vydel
- Past members: FC Spies
- Website: www.rubybonesband.com

Ruby Bones are an American rock band from New Jersey.

== History ==
Chris Fox is a former member of the New Brunswick, New Jersey band Boxed Wine. They released two singles, two EPs and a full-length album. When Boxed Wine disbanded, Fox began writing folk songs, and in 2015, he was joined by drummer James Janocha of the band Twin Berlin, and bassist FC Spies to reinterpret his compositions as rock anthems, which formed the indie rock group Ruby Bones.

Their self-titled album was released on 12 May 2017, and it charted on the Billboard Heatseeker Middle Atlantic Chart at No. 7. It also was No. 16 on the Most Added NACC radio charts, and peaked at No. 175 on the Top 200. Their video for the single "Gone Gone Gone" features actors Ryan Christian and Natalie Stevens.

== Members ==
- Chris Fox – vocals and guitar (2015–present)
- James Janocha – drums (2015–present)
- FC Spies – bass (2015–2021)
- Matt Cohen – lead guitar (2019–present)
- Eric Vydel – bass (2022–2025)
- CJ Anderson – bass (2025–present)

== Discography ==
Albums

- Laser Tooth Tiger (2021)
- Press Rewind // Faster (2021)
- Drink All Night (2021)
- Tooth (2019)
- Rooftops (2019)
- Not Enough (2018)
- Laser (2018)
- Ruby Bones (2017)
