= Dariacore (album) =

2021 album by Jane Remover as Leroy

Studio album by Leroy
- Released: May 14, 2021
- Genres: Mashup; dariacore (Note: The dariacore microgenre was named after the album itself.)
- Length: 28:58
- Label: Self-released
- Producer: Jane Remover

Leroy chronology
Dariacore (2021)	Dariacore 2: Enter Here, Hell to the Left (2021)

Jane Remover chronology
Teen Week (2021)	Dariacore (2021)	Dariacore 2: Enter Here, Hell to the Left (2021)

Dariacore is the debut studio album by Leroy, a side project of the American musician Jane Remover. It was self-released on May 14, 2021. Described as a mashup album, Dariacore drew inspiration from the musician Vektroid and SoundClown music. Its name is taken from the Daria TV series, as the series also served for the visual aesthetic of the album. Dariacore was responsible for the creation of a genre of the same name, which inspired a wave of SoundCloud artists, and was considered one of the best albums of 2021 by The Fader. It received two sequels.

== Background and composition ==
"Copyright Strike My Fucking Nuts"
"Copyright Strike My Fucking Nuts", a breakcore mashup, features a "chipmunk-ified interpolation" of Vanessa Carlton's "A Thousand Miles" "interspersed with heavy drumming and a myriad of semi-random samples".

Dariacore was a result of Remover "messing around" in the digital audio workstation FL Studio after being inspired by the production livestreams of the electronic artist Vektroid. They were also inspired by Vektroid's "glitchy" track "Sick & Panic" and SoundClown music. Remover began uploading untitled songs under the pseudonym Leroy, using screenshots taken from the television show Daria as covers.

Dariacore is a mashup album. Jordan Darville of The Fader wrote, "Thanks to its liberal use of frenzied breakbeats, Dariacore could be described as a grandson of drum and bass, with a heart that pumps Frosted Flakes milk." In a review for Sputnikmusic, staff member Kirk Bowman deemed the album "equal parts Girl Talk, brostep, and Vine compilation". He thought it drew inspiration from many sources, like hyperpop, drum and bass, memes, and especially pop music. The album was self-released on May 14, 2021.

== Reception and legacy ==
Professional ratings
Review scores
Source	Rating
Sputnikmusic	4.3/5

In his 4.3/5 review for Sputnikmusic, Bowman said that "Leroy [...] has proven their worth several times this year alone, but for my money, this is their high point". He said that "this is the sound of someone who adores music [...] and has enormous talent pairing that with a sense of humor, a short attention span, and, above all, brilliant musicality". Bowman was positive of the album's flow and, even though it contained "crazy ideas", "to one extent or another, all these ideas somehow work. This is the epitome of taking risks and having it pay off." He declared that "Go White Enby Go" could be his favorite song of the year. Dariacore was listed as the 40th best album of 2021 by The Fader's staff. Darville wrote that "perhaps every generation needs a musical Frankenstein, and if that's the case, I'm glad Gen Z has Leroy".

Remover is credited with creating the dariacore microgenre—named after the album itself—which inspired a wave of SoundCloud artists. They referred to the microgenre's name as "a joke that's been going on for too long." In a review of their album Frailty released under Jane Remover, Mano Sundaresan wrote to Pitchfork that "[Remover's] defining moment of the year may be inventing a glorious microgenre of shitposty Jersey club mashups called dariacore". With the popularity of the album, they stated: "I guess people just caught on and wanted to join me and that's how it came to be. I like how much fun everyone's having with it. I want to keep it separate from [Jane Remover], but I also don't really have a direction that I want to take Leroy in. I just do whatever I want on there and all the songs just happened to sound the same." Remover released two sequels: Dariacore 2: Enter Here, Hell to the Left (2021) and Dariacore 3... At Least I Think That's What It's Called? (2022).

== Track listing ==
All songs produced by Jane Remover and stylized in all lowercase.

No.	Title	Length
1.	"Ricky Bobby"	2:00
2.	"Parental Rift"	2:05
3.	"Go White Enby Go (Note: "Go White Enby Go" was briefly renamed to "Go White Girl Go" before being reverted to the original title.)"	1:16
4.	"Outside"	1:35
5.	"1235"	1:54
6.	"Theyfriend"	1:52
7.	"2008"	1:26
8.	"Copyright Strike My Fucking Nuts"	2:32
9.	"Will Work for Food"	1:30
10.	"Bluuuueeeee (Note: "Bluuuueeeee" was removed from the official SoundCloud release of the album.)"	1:50
11.	"Die in My Dream"	2:05
12.	"Turmoiled"	1:38
13.	"Dessert"	1:43
14.	"2on"	1:51
15.	"Shashshashshash"	2:02
16.	"Virginity Rockstar"	1:39
Total length:		28:58

== Release history ==
Release history for Dariacore
Region	Date	Format(s)	Label
Worldwide	May 14, 2021	Digital download; streaming	Self-released
