= Jane Remover =

American rapper and producer (born 2003)

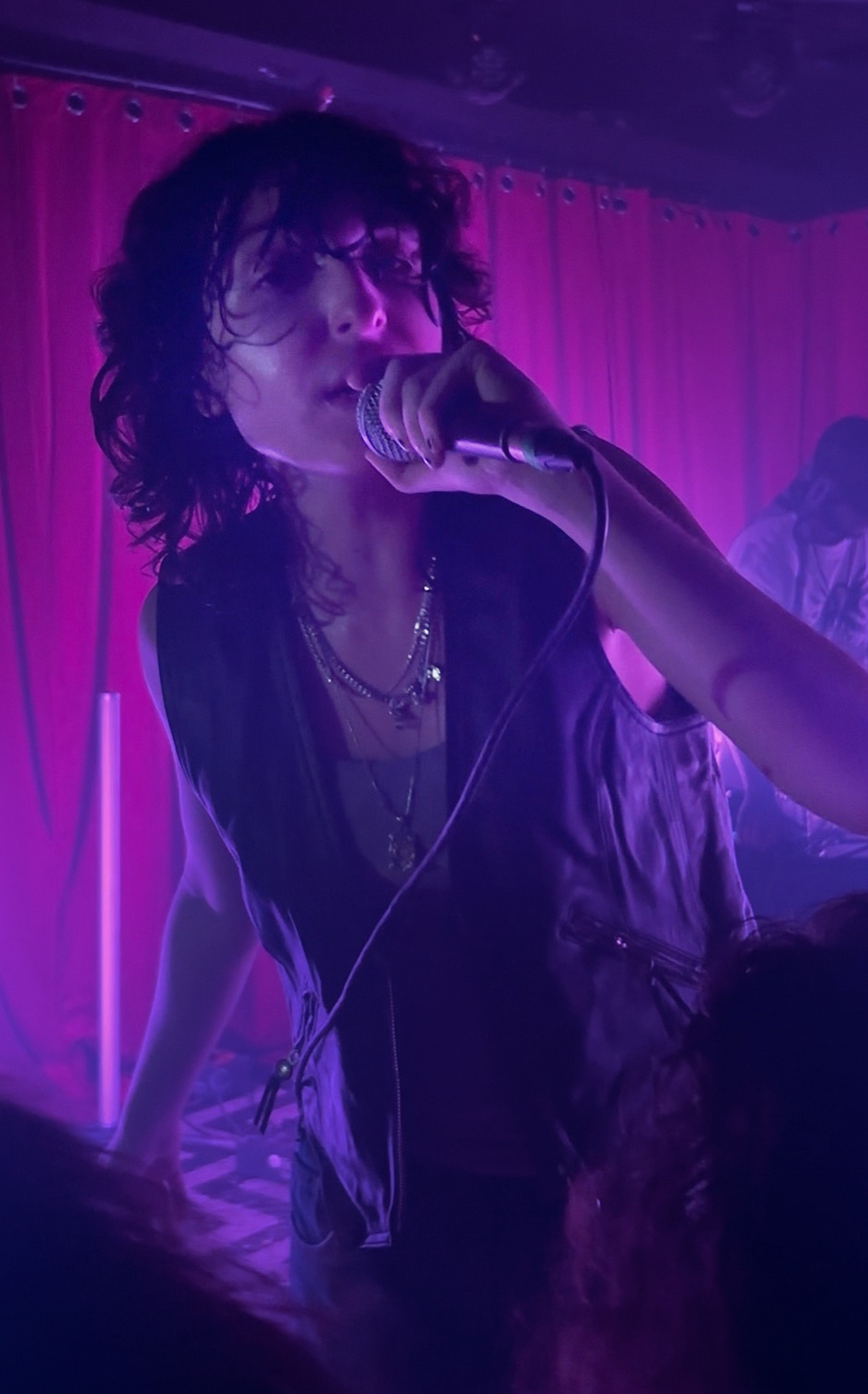
- Remover in 2025

Background information
- Also known as: Dltzk (Note: Retired in 2022.); Leroy (Note: Briefly retired in 2022.); Venturing; Jamison Bleached Waters
- Born: September 26, 2003 (age 23); Newark, New Jersey, US
- Genres: Digicore; hyperpop; rage; experimental hip-hop; emo; EDM; shoegaze
- Occupation: Musician
- Works: Discography
- Years active: 2017–present
- Label: deadAir

Jane Remover (born September 26, 2003) is an American rapper, record producer, and singer-songwriter. They (Note: Remover uses any pronouns, but prefers they/them.) made their debut with Teen Week in 2021, a progressive pop and digicore EP with themes of adolescence. The same year, they released their debut studio album, Frailty, a coming of age album following the similar themes of Teen Week, but encompassing a wide range of genres.

After coming out as transgender, they released their second studio album, Census Designated, in 2023, a shoegaze and post-rock concept album inspired by a "near-death experience" on a road trip. In 2025, they released their third studio album, Revengeseekerz, with influence from digicore and EDM, and later that year released their second EP Heart, which featured more pop-focused songs, a majority of which had been previously released as singles throughout 2024.

In their side project Leroy, they pioneered the "dariacore" microgenre on SoundCloud with their album of the same name, in 2021. They also have an indie rock side project Venturing, with its most notable release being the album Ghostholding (2025).

== Early life ==
Remover, along with their twin sister, was born in Newark, New Jersey to a Turkish Cypriot immigrant father and a Polish American mother, living there until they moved to Clark around 2011. They wanted to be a storm chaser or a meteorologist growing up. Remover's interest in music production stems back as far as 2011, inspired by dubstep producers including Skrillex, Kill the Noise, and Virtual Riot. They would later produce different styles of EDM in the mid-2010s, citing Porter Robinson as their biggest influence. From electronic music, Remover's production became more trap-centric around 2018; they cited artists such as Trippie Redd, Earl Sweatshirt, and Tyler, the Creator as inspirations. Guest production then became a large part of Remover's early career, with them being a member of multiple SoundCloud collectives including PlanetZero and Graveem1nd. Their production gradually became more digicore-oriented.

== Career ==
=== 2019–2021: Early work, Teen Week and Frailty ===
In late 2019, Remover began self-producing and releasing their own works on their SoundCloud. One of Remover's first solo releases, "What's My Age Again?", gained popularity from being shared on Twitter after its release in 2020. On February 9, 2021, they released the song "Back Off!!!" with Kmoe and Juno on ArtbyFORM's All Nighter Vol. 6, a charity compilation album produced within 24 hours which received praise from Porter Robinson and Pitchfork. Their debut EP, Teen Week, was released on February 26, 2021, under the pseudonym Dltzk (stylized as "dltzk"). The track "Homeswitcher", featuring Kmoe, reached 100,000 streams on SoundCloud within the first two weeks of its release. On June 22, 2021, Remover released a remix of "Legend" by Chinese hyperpop musician Alice Longyu Gao and Canadian punk musician Alice Glass.

After several more non-album singles, Remover began teasing the release of their debut studio album, Frailty. Starting in June 2021, three singles were released for it: "How to Lie", "Pretender", and "Search Party". Following these, Frailty was released via DeadAir Records on November 12, 2021. The album was acclaimed by various publications, such as Pitchfork, who placed the album at #47 on their list of the best albums of 2021, with the Fader stating the album established them as "the face of digicore".

=== 2022–2024: Census Designated ===
From June 1 to June 22, 2022, Remover performed as an opening act for American chiptune rock band Anamanaguchi, on the tour for their soundtrack to Scott Pilgrim vs. The World: The Game, alongside artists such as C418 and 8485. On June 27, 2022, Remover announced the retirement of the Dltzk pseudonym, and introduced the name Jane Remover. On the same date, they released the single "Royal Blue Walls". In Remover's statement, they said "the stage name Dltzk has never sat right with me" and that it "reminds me of a period of my life I'd like to move past". They also announced that the Teen Week EP would be abridged, as they had become uncomfortable with the project as it was originally released. This change went into effect on October 10, 2022, and four songs were removed from the EP.

Remover debuted on the British record label PC Music, run by A. G. Cook, on July 21, 2022 with a remix for "Honest" by Umru and Cecile Believe. Later in the year, their second single under the name Jane Remover, "Contingency Song", was released on November 16, 2022. They were the opening act for Brakence's Hypochondriac tour from November 26 to December 20, 2022. While on the tour, they released a remix of "4EVER" by That Kid and Bébe Yana (formerly of EvoL) on December 6, as part of the remix package for That Kid's mixtape Superstar. In March 2023, Remover became an official resident of NTS Radio, where they performed monthly hour-long sets in a series titled "Wait Watch This", on the station's second channel. They retired their NTS residency in December 2024.

On August 23, 2023, Remover announced their second album, Census Designated, and shared the lead single, "Lips". On September 20, the album's title track, "Census Designated", was released with an accompanying music video directed by Quadeca, and the album was released on October 20, 2023. The album saw their move away from bitcrushing and sampling towards a "blend of shoegaze and bedroom pop", guitar rock anthems with slow buildup and deafening noisy climaxes. A Pitchfork review of Census Designated compared this iteration of their sound to music acts such as Ethel Cain, My Bloody Valentine, Slowdive, and yeule. During the Census rollout, Remover released a collaboration with the musician Underscores, "Uncanny Long Arms", on September 22, 2023 as part of her second studio album, Wallsocket. In February 2024, Remover began the Designated Dreams tour, co-headlining alongside their labelmate Quannnic. Playing 12 dates across the US, the tour promoted both artists' albums released the year before, being Census Designated and Stepdream, respectively.

=== 2024–2025: Revengeseekerz and Heart ===
Remover performing during their Turn Up Or Die Tour in Germany, 2025

Remover released a remix for Tinashe's single "Nasty" on June 18, 2024, as part of her EP for the song alongside artists such as Kaytranada, Wuki, and DJ Tunez. Their remix was compared by Stereogum to Aphex Twin and Miami bass music. On July 31, 2024, Remover released "Flash in the Pan" accompanied by "Dream Sequence", and later released "Magic I Want U" accompanied by "How to Teleport" on September 4, 2024. Both singles were initially set to release on a planned third studio album, but the album was scrapped and instead replaced with what would evolve to be Revengeseekerz. Through August and September 2024, Remover opened for American rapper JPEGMafia's Lay Down My Life tour. On October 24, 2024, Remover released their remix of "Shake It Like A" by the American pop duo Frost Children and Detroit rapper Danny Brown.

In December 2024, Remover announced the Turn Up or Die tour, their first as the sole headliner. The tour featured Dazegxd, as well as special guests d0llywood1 and Lucy Bedroque. On January 1, 2025, Remover announced their third studio album, Revengeseekerz, alongside the release of its lead single, "JRJRJR", with a music video directed by Parker Corey of Injury Reserve. On February 26, the second single for the album was released, titled "Dancing with Your Eyes Closed". The album released on April 4, 2025 with 12 tracks, including a guest appearance from Danny Brown. In support of the album, they embarked on the Turn Up or Die tour across the United States and Canada throughout April and May 2025, and performed at the Fuji Rock Festival in Japan and Lollapalooza in Chicago. Remover was also one of the opening acts for the North American leg of Turnstile's Never Enough Tour alongside Amyl and the Sniffers, Speed, Mannequin Pussy, and Blood Orange, which took place throughout September and October 2025.

On May 22, 2025, an exclusive track from the CD edition of Revengeseekerz, "Supernova" featuring North Carolina rapper Funeral, was released to streaming services. On August 14, they appeared on the NTS radio station once again, performing a mix titled jane_remover_paintjob.zip for deadAir's "Transmissions" series. The following day, they released a remix of That Kid's "Calvin Klein", which was featured on the remix package for That Kid's mixtape TK Ultra. On August 18, 2025, Remover released a mixtape titled Indie rock with no prior announcement. It was made available through an alternate SoundCloud account with a blank name. They had utilized sounds influenced from the rage microgenre of trap music, likely inspired from the works of artists Che and Yeat. The project was taken down approximately two hours after its release; it features 17 tracks and has a runtime of around 40 minutes. On September 15, Remover was announced to perform at Coachella 2026. Two months later, Remover released a second collaboration with Danny Brown on November 7, "All4U", featured on his album Stardust. On December 5, 2025, Remover surprise released an EP titled Heart (stylized as ♡), consisting of singles Remover released in 2024—"Magic I Want U," "How to Teleport," "Flash in the Pan," and "Dream Sequence"—with two additional tracks "So What?" and "Music Baby".

=== 2026-present: Coachella and Live Exhibit Tour ===
Remover appeared in the music video for Underscores' "Tell Me (U Want It)", released on February 25, 2026 as a single for her album U. To celebrate the album's release, Underscores organized a pop-up DJ set on April 15, 2026 at the Hollywood Forever Cemetery in the back of a U-Haul truck, which Remover took part in along with several other performers, including Ninajirachi and Ericdoa. On April 12, 2026, Remover performed at the Coachella Valley Music and Arts Festival, and subsequently released two live edits from the performance on April 22. On June 4, 2026, Remover released "Suave", a collaboration with Chilean singer-songwriter Akriila. The song was featured on Akriila's album Lucy Miró al Mundo y Notó Que Está Girando, which released on September 3.

Remover embarked on the Live Exhibit Tour with Dazegxd in North America and Europe from June 2026 to October 2026, with additional legs of the tour scheduled to follow in Asia and Oceania from December 2026 to February 2027. On September 23, 2026, Remover released the single "Beauty Sleep", with an accompanying music video directed by Brendan Burton. The song received much acclaim from critics, and was included on Alternative Press, Pitchfork and The New York Times' lists of the best singles of the week. In October 2026, Remover performed at the Niteharts festival in San Diego, alongside Porter Robinson, Underscores, Frost Children, DJ Snake, RL Grime, Thaiboy Digital, 2hollis, ISOxo and Knock2, with Madeon and Ken Carson as guests. While opening for Charli XCX in Los Angeles on the Music, Fashion, Film Tour, Underscores brought Remover out on stage to perform an unreleased collaboration on October 18.

== Side projects ==
=== Leroy ===
Leroy is a side project by Remover, under which they create sample-heavy EDM mashups. These releases sample a wide range of sounds, including pop songs of the 2010s, viral videos, and even Remover's own music. They released a series of albums with the name "dariacore", the first of them on May 14, 2021. The cover art for each album released under the Leroy moniker were screenshots from the TV series Daria, which led to the term "dariacore" being used to describe the unique production style that Remover used for these releases. The genre was described by Raphael Helfand of The Fader as "taking hyperpop's silliest tendencies to their logical conclusions". Three Dariacore albums were released under the pseudonym "leroy" from December 2020 to May 2022, after which the moniker was officially retired in June 2022 with the release of a DJ mix titled "leroy & dltzk Memorial Service". This series of albums has since inspired many artists to adopt a similar style of production, releasing short sample-based EDM tracks themed around popular media.

On July 21, 2023, Remover released the fourth studio album under the Leroy pseudonym, Grave Robbing, which premiered on NTS Radio. Remover made a surprise return in June 2025 after a near two-year hiatus, releasing multiple Leroy singles on their SoundCloud account and subsequently releasing Status Update Music, the pseudonym's fifth album, on May 14, 2026, the five year anniversary of Dariacore.

=== Venturing ===
Venturing is a side project of Jane Remover. It initially started as a fictional indie rock band created by Remover. They released several tracks under the Venturing alias onto SoundCloud throughout 2022 and 2023, before releasing Arizona, their official debut EP as Venturing, onto streaming platforms on May 19, 2023. Remover officially announced the project's debut studio album, Ghostholding, on December 5, 2024. It was released on February 14, 2025. On February 13, 2026, Remover released the single "In the Dark" under the alias. Remover released the EP Nowhere under the alias on July 31, 2026.

== Personal life and views ==
Remover attended The College of New Jersey for one semester before leaving to pursue music full-time. They formerly made music under the pseudonym Dltzk. After coming out publicly as a trans woman in 2022, they created the name Jane Remover, as they left their deadname behind. In early 2025, Remover stated that they are non-binary; in a 2025 interview with NME, they said: "I'm not not trans, but I'm not a trans woman." In February 2026, Remover said that they go by any pronouns, but prefer they/them.

Remover is a participant in No Music for Genocide, a musician-led boycott movement protesting Israel's military actions against Palestinians by removing their music from Israeli streaming services. In August 2026, Remover posted an Instagram story stating that they would not perform at the M3F Festival unless the Israeli band Temper City was removed from the festival's lineup. One of Temper City's members, Eytan Peled, was a member from the Israel Defense Forces. In September 2026, the M3F Festival posted an updated line-up in which Remover no longer appears, with their former spot being replaced by record producer Flying Lotus.

== Discography ==
Studio albums

- Frailty (2021)
- Census Designated (2023)
- Revengeseekerz (2025)

As Leroy

- Dariacore (2021)
- Dariacore 2: Enter Here, Hell to the Left (2021)
- Dariacore 3... At least I think that's what it's called? (2022)
- Grave Robbing (2023)
- Status Update Music (2026)

As Venturing

- Ghostholding (2025)

== Tours ==
=== Headlining ===
- Designated Dreams Tour (with Quannnic) (2024)
- Turn Up or Die (with Dazegxd, D0llywood1, and Lucy Bedroque) (2025-2026)
- Live Exhibit (with Dazegxd) (2026-2027)

=== Opening ===
- Scott Pilgrim vs. The World: The Game Soundtrack: The Tour (with Anamanaguchi, C418, Peelander-Z, GRRL, Ben Briggs, Bitcrusher Boi, Padlock, Polykor, Water Spirit, Nullsleep, Equip, Warm Human, 8485, Blackwinterwells, Ultra Caro, May Rio, Bit Shifter, Maxo, Heartavi, Patchymate, Alex DL, & DJ Perro) (2022)
- The Hypochondriac Tour (with Brakence) (2022)
- Lay Down My Life Tour (with JPEGMafia and RXKNephew) (2024)
- Never Enough Tour (with Turnstile, Amyl and the Sniffers, Blood Orange, Mannequin Pussy, and Speed) (2025)
