= Census Designated =

2023 studio album by Jane Remover

Studio album by Jane Remover
- Released: October 20, 2023
- Recorded: February 4, 2022 – July 22, 2023
- Studios: Studio North (Philadelphia); Remover's house (New Jersey)
- Genres: Shoegaze; post-rock
- Length: 61:30
- Label: DeadAir
- Producer: Jane Remover

Jane Remover chronology
| Grave Robbing (2023) | Census Designated (2023) | Ghostholding (2025) |

Jane Remover studio album chronology
| Frailty (2021) | Census Designated (2023) | Revengeseekerz (2025) |

Singles from Census Designated
- 1. "Cage Girl (Note: The single version of the song differs from the album version.)" Released: June 27, 2022; 2. "Contingency Song" Released: November 16, 2022; 3. "Lips" Released: August 23, 2023; 4. "Census Designated" Released: September 20, 2023

Census Designated is the second studio album by the American musician Jane Remover. It was released by DeadAir Records on October 20, 2023, as the follow up to their debut album Frailty in 2021. The following year, they came out as a trans woman and changed their stage name as they worked on Census Designated. The material on the album was inspired by horror movies, the music of the singer-songwriter Ethel Cain, and an incident where they almost died while on a road trip through a blizzard. It was written in a variety of locations, including Remover's house, at school, and on the road while touring with Brakence. Going through numerous revisions, the tracks were recorded in both Remover's house in New Jersey and at Studio North in Philadelphia; the album was entirely produced by Remover themself.

Census Designated is a concept album in the shoegaze and post-rock genres; its story takes place over the course of one night, from sunset to dusk. It presents Auto-Tuned vocals that address themes of desperation, isolation, and rejection. Throughout its recording process, Remover wanted to distance themselves from the labels that were given to their previous work. Its artwork was photographed by Brendon Burton and was chosen as the cover art to represent Census Designated's overarching coming-of-age theme. The album was promoted with four singles and a tour across North America with Quannnic. The album received positive reviews from publications; Paste and Pitchfork included the single "Census Designated" in their best songs of the year lists. The album charted on the North American College and Community Radio Chart (NACC).

== Background ==
Jane Remover released their debut studio album, Frailty, in November 2021, to critical acclaim. It was generally described as being digicore, hyperpop, emo, and EDM, as well as a variety of other genres. Ever since they started releasing music, they had always wanted to change their sound and "work towards the goal of being a jack-of-all-trades". During June 2022, they released the singles "Royal Blue Walls" and "Cage Girl" and came out as a trans woman, changing their stage name to Jane Remover; Census Designated is their first album released under the name. During 2022, they toured the United States with Brakence in support of his Hypochondriac Tour.

== Development ==
=== Writing ===
Due to Remover recording Frailty in their childhood bedroom in New Jersey, the state inspired a lot of material that was on the album. Alternatively, Census Designated was inspired by a self-described "near-death experience" Remover went through while on a cross-country road trip through a blizzard. They were travelling to Seattle late at night, but the snow became unbearable and they had to make a pit stop in John Day, Oregon. They said it felt like a "reality check" that made them "want to stop ruining things for [themselves]". They wrote some of the songs at their house, at school, and while being on the road as they were on tour. Speaking about the album's visuals, they commented: "I kind of just had this idea of an empty plane, and dilapidated houses and just like decay and nothing." The ideas for the album's imagery came to them when they first started working on the album musically.

The songs on Census Designated went through numerous revisions. They were written about things Remover was afraid of happening instead of things that actually occurred in real life. Remover shared that while work on the album progressed, they felt the need "to make something else, […] to make something better" with each successive track that was recorded. The track "Lips" served as "a skeleton key for the rest of the album in both mood and sound", as Remover became obsessed with the climax of the song, and thought: "I can find a way to build a whole universe out of this." They wanted the listener to interpret the lyrics differently, as they thought with the use of body horror imagery, they could keep the lyrics vague and abstract. They were also interested in watching horror movies while creating the album; such as 1997's Cutting Moments while writing "Lips". When they wrote "Backseat Girl", they had not cried in a while and thought of a memory "of standing next to someone who was crying during a show", leading them to feel inconvenienced, which inspired the song.

=== Production ===
Census Designated was recorded in both Remover's house in New Jersey and at Studio North in Philadelphia, from February 4, 2022, to July 22, 2023. It was entirely produced by Remover. Remover originally planned it to be an extended play (EP) with six to seven tracks and a 40 minute runtime. They later realized they wanted to "revisit these old songs that deserved better". Following the release of Frailty, Remover felt conflicted over the vocal performances included on the album; criticism directed at the album's recording quality prompted them to "[try] and clean … up in all aspects" while working on Census Designated. In an interview with Stereogum, Remover shared that they re-recorded the track "Lips" roughly 100 times because they were unsatisfied with each vocal take, and this desire to continually re-record the song persisted into the album's mixing stage. During the mixing process, Remover oversaw this aspect of the production in-person to ensure that it was "as perfect as it [could] be" before the album was released. After hearing their music being played at a venue, it gave insight into how to make and mix their music in the future.

On Census Designated, Remover wanted to distance themselves from the labels that were given to their previous work, specifically the term "Internet music". With the album, they said that they "kind of found the lane that [they] [want] to stay in", commenting on their production style. When speaking about genre, they believed that there is not a lane. Remover cited the music of the American singer-songwriter Ethel Cain, namely her album Preacher's Daughter (2022), as another source of inspiration for material included on Census Designated. The song "Cage Girl", which Remover revealed was originally "a demo that [they] made in an hour" for a creative writing class in 2022, is a favorite of Cain's.

== Composition ==
=== Overview ===
Census Designated is primarily a shoegaze (Note: Attributed to Ondarock, Pitchfork, Billboard, Paste, Stereogum, and The Guardian.) and post-rock album that has also been described as bedroom pop, experimental rock, and noise rock. It is over an hour long and all of the tracks run for more than four and a half minutes, with most lasting up to six minutes. The second half of the album is largely based on nightmares Remover feared would materialize in their own life; the tracks "Census Designated", "Video", and "Contingency Song" are told from the perspective of being in a relationship. It presents Auto-Tuned vocals that address themes of desperation, isolation, and rejection. Emma Madden of Them described the lyrics as "rich with half-vague, half-precise poetry" and thought Remover's guitar tone "holds both a sense of terror and beauty". Spencer Nafekh-Blanchette from Exclaim! called Census Designated "a new chapter in Remover's experimental production" and commented on how Remover delivers droning sounds that, though are noisy, are more calm compared to their previous music. For Pitchfork, Kieran Press-Reynolds commented that moments on the album shift abruptly from calm to intense bursts of sounds. He further questioned, because Remover has experimented with drum and bass, ambient, glitch rap, and Jersey club in the past, "why would [they] choose fiery avant-rock as a primary vehicle?".

Census Designated is a concept album that takes place over the course of one night. Its story begins at sunset and is "guided by Jane Remover's streams of consciousness", ending at dusk. According to Paste's Madelyn Dawson, "its 10 tracks span over an hour of deliberate buildups, frenetic breakdowns and visceral, wry lyricism". It incorporates organic and live instrumentation. Ian Cohen from Stereogum said the album explores the darker edges of rock music. The Guardian's Ben Beaumont-Thomas compared their vocals to that of K-pop and Europop singers, and mentioned how they reinvigorate guitar sounds by layering them with static and subtle noise elements. Madden proposed that the album should be listened to "just past sundown, when there's a brief and lonely pause in space and time and it feels like you are the only person experiencing reality". Press-Reynolds also mentioned how after each loud noise, there is a calm moment that follows.

=== Songs ===
Census Designated's opening track is "Cage Girl / Camgirl", a bedroom pop and drone track that begins with a buzzing and throaty croaking sound that expands into a backing guitar, building into a crescendo. The guitars are "detuned to a death metal gurgle" and the track feels cinematic and fictional, according to Cohen. It is followed by four post-rock tracks; "Lips" is also an indie ballad that begins with gentle vocals discussing the unpredictability of young love, and being someone's "nervous wreck". Its looping guitar strumming fizzles out until the track becomes distorted with drums that reach a climax of purging noise. Press-Reynolds perceived it as a combination between My Bloody Valentine and Fatal Attraction (2023). "Fling" starts out with rough static that transitions into a gentler soundscape. Fantano described it as having "super righteous riffs" and "screaming walls of distorted chords laced with some glossy vocal harmonies" and "stuttering noise". "Holding a Leech" is also a shoegaze track that increasingly intensifies as it picks up in pace. "Backseat Girl" is about how Remover felt like they ignored others people's feelings, even when they were aware of their own.

With "Idling Somewhere", its loud moments and "destructive" feedback were described as "more punishing than harsh noise albums" by Fantano. Ondarock's Michele Corrado wrote that the track "breaks out with lacerating screamo". (Note: This quote is a translation of the original text: "sbrocca in laceranti screamo") The shoegaze "Always Have Always Will" begins with an "ahhh" sound that was likened to an extending infinity mirror by Press-Reynolds. It is a softer and more apologetic track that climaxes with a rush of static; according to Press-Reynolds, it feels more joyful than sorrowful compared to the album's other songs. "Census Designated" discusses struggling with the present and being anxious about what is next in their life. The track was written about the fear of being deceived and exploited because of their age; it also mentions numerous mental states and different geographic locations. They also sing about liking the idea of being "young blood, fresh meat", and the track sonically ends with chaos and noise. Writing for Pitchfork, Hattie Lindert felt it had a more minimalist sound when compared to Frailty. Fantano called it "one of the most multifaceted songs" on the album, and that it "hits some epic and noisy highs". The penultimate track "Video" tells the story of a woman who becomes infatuated with a man she watched touch himself online, before he exploits her when the two eventually meet outside of the Internet. Its guitar strums for six minutes until the track bursts with a powerful scream. The final track, "Contingency Song", contains dissonant drones, and Press-Reynolds described it as containing a "sparse winter horizon" and that "you can almost feel the chill of its malign fog".

== Artwork ==
The album's artwork was shot by the American photographer Brendon Burton, and depicts Remover standing alone in a field with their back towards the camera as they face the remnants of a dilapidated house. Speaking with Them, Remover commented that they chose this photograph to serve as the artwork because it represents Census Designated's overarching coming-of-age theme. When Madden proposed that the empty house featured prominently in the image might embody emotions related to "feeling further away from home", Remover welcomed the idea. Though they commented that the suggestion "wasn't what [they were] going for" personally, they also expressed their intention for the album's material to be open for interpretation.

== Promotion and release ==
In preparation of Census Designated's release, Remover posted images to their social media accounts that consisted of them standing in places such as empty wheat fields, in front of bare buildings, and outside a window in a deserted landscape. "Cage Girl", which serves as half of the album's opening track, was initially released as a demo on SoundCloud in April 2022 before being officially released alongside the non-album single "Royal Blue Walls" (Note: "Royal Blue Walls" is included as a bonus track on Census Designated's vinyl release.) on June 27, 2022. "Contingency Song" was released as the album's second single on November 16; the album features an alternate version of the song. "Lips" was announced alongside the album itself and released as the third single on August 23, 2023. The album's title track, "Census Designated", was released as the fourth and final single on September 20. It was accompanied by the first-ever music video from Remover, directed by Quadeca. Census Designated was released by DeadAir Records on October 20, 2023, through digital, CD, and LP formats. It was leaked in Japan days before its release; in response, Remover shared that they have become accustomed to their music leaking prematurely after experiencing their previous projects, Teen Week and Frailty (both 2021), being spread online before their respective release dates. On October 31, 2023, Remover announced that they would be co-headlining the Designated Dreams Tour with Quannnic throughout February 2024. The tour saw the two artists travel across the United States to perform a total of 12 shows. Census Designated peaked at number 27 on the North American College and Community Radio Chart (NACC) dated November 14.

== Critical reception ==
Professional ratings
Review scores
| Source | Rating |
|---|---|
| Exclaim! | 7/10 |
| The Guardian | 5/5 stars |
| The Needle Drop | 6/10 (Note: Specifically, Fantano rated the album a "strong 6".) |
| Ondarock | 7/10 |
| Pitchfork | 7.8/10 |

Census Designated received mostly positive reviews from publications. Beaumont-Thomas thought Remover's guitar-playing sounds "like no one else", due to their history in genres such as digicore and hyperpop. He called Remover a "superb arranger" and that they are able to revitalize "these staple guitar sounds". He concluded by writing that there "isn't a single weak song" on the album and called the title track the "greatest [realization] of [their] visionary approach". Press-Reynolds described it as "a feverish mutation of shoegaze and bedroom pop", saying the album offers an immersive experience, and called it their "most poignant and piercing music" yet. Nafekh-Blanchette thought the album to be their"most cohesive work yet", and that it trades the "contagious energy" of their previous works for "retrospection and tranquility". Corrado said the sounds heard on Frailty are "completely overturned" (Note: This quote is a translation of the original text: "completamente ribaltate") and called Remover's guitar "a guide to [their] long compositions". (Note: This quote is a translation of the original text: "da guida alle lunghe composizioni della cantautrice") He concluded his review with stating: "We can say that the underground-oriented Generation Z has found an important champion." (Note: This quote is a translation of the original text: "possiamo affermare che la Z Generation più incline all'underground abbia trovato un'importante paladina") Fantano thought the album was ambitious and its artistic intentions were pure.

Some reviewers were critical of the album's length. Press-Reynolds believed that some of the songs run on for too long, and Corrado commented on how the length of the album is not entirely useful. Nafekh-Blanchette thought that the album's "one truly divisive element" is its length; he stated that the plentiful amount of similar sounds was a contributing factor. Reviewers also opined that the album is a downgrade when compared to Remover's previous work. Press-Reynolds thought the album to not be as sonically pleasing as Frailty, while Nafekh-Blanchette wrote that the album lacks the "unpredictability" of Remover's album Dariacore (2021), released under the alias Leroy. Fantano overall believed that it was a downgrade when compared to Frailty.

Census Designated's title track was named one of the best tracks of the year by Pitchfork and Paste. The former website considered it the 73rd best song of the year; Daniel Bromfield wrote that Remover is "acutely aware of how dangerous show business can be for those who find early success", calling its lyrics "no less alarming than the hair-raising music behind it". The latter website ranked it the 97th best song of the year; Dawson described it as a "a portrait of an artist so comfortably entrenched in the discomfort of [their] own sonic world". She concluded by mentioning how Remover is succeeding at knowing their music "sounds like absolutely no one else".

== Track listing ==
All tracks are written and produced by Jane Remover.

Census Designated track listing
| No. | Title | Length |
|---|---|---|
| 1. | "Cage Girl / Camgirl" | 5:43 |
| 2. | "Lips" | 5:11 |
| 3. | "Fling" | 4:54 |
| 4. | "Holding a Leech" | 4:36 |
| 5. | "Backseat Girl" | 6:00 |
| 6. | "Idling Somewhere" | 7:23 |
| 7. | "Always Have Always Will" | 6:30 |
| 8. | "Census Designated" | 6:01 |
| 9. | "Video" | 8:42 |
| 10. | "Contingency Song" (album version) | 6:26 |
| Total length: | | 61:30 |

Vinyl release
| No. | Title | Length |
|---|---|---|
| 11. | "Royal Blue Walls" | 6:02 |
| 12. | "John Doe Song" | 4:13 |
| Total length: | | 71:45 |

== Personnel ==
Credits are adapted from the liner notes of Census Designated.

Musicians

- Jane Remover – songwriting, production
- Douglas Dulgarian – additional guitar, bass (2–7, 9)
- Kale Itkonen – additional synths (6)

Technical

- Kayla Reagan – mixing (1–9)
- Jane Remover – mixing (10)
- Hector Vega – mastering
- Moa – vinyl mastering

Artwork

- Brendon Burton – cover art, photography

== Charts ==
Chart performance for Census Designated
| Chart (2023) | Peak position |
|---|---|
| US & Canadian College Radio Top 200 (NACC) | 27 |
