= Dreamflasher =

2025 song by Jane Remover

Single by Jane Remover

from the album Revengeseekerz
- B-side: "Audiostalker"
- Released: September 12, 2025
- Genre: Digicore; rage
- Length: 3:44
- Songwriter: Jane Remover
- Producer: Jane Remover

Jane Remover singles chronology
"Calvin Klein" (2025)	"Dreamflasher" (2025)	"Headbanger" (2026)

"Dreamflasher" is a song by the American musician Jane Remover. It was released on September 12, 2025, as the third single for Revengeseekerz. The single also includes the B-side "Audiostalker" featuring American rapper Lucy Bedroque.

== Music and lyrics ==
Dreamflasher is a digicore and rage song with a runtime of three minutes and forty-four seconds. "Dreamflasher" opens with a yawning harmonica and Remover reflects on their musical success, with people screaming Remover's name and Remover themself professing to an anonymous lover.

== Release ==
"Dreamflasher" was released as a single on September 12, 2025, with "Audiostalker" (featuring Lucy Bedroque) as its B-side. "Audiostalker" was initially a track from Remover's briefly released mixtape Indie Rock (2025). A music video was also released, involving director Brendon Burton, editor Remover, the director of photography Joriel Cura, producers Skeleton Crew and Paul Mauer, gaffer Harrison Segal, gaffer assistant Porter Durkee, head of grip department Alex Perales, and manager of color Braxton Apana. Remover themself said that "Dreamflasher" was one of their "two most favorite songs to make on this album."

== Critical reception ==
In a positive review, Sheldon Pearce of NPR Music wrote that the single "is like strapping subwoofers to a slot machine, and then experiencing the whole bass-boosted phantasmagoria as a zonked-out AR video game simulation. Toby Wilkins of Silent Radio described that the song "sounds like Remover stacked as many instrumentals as possible on top of each other to create a beat that feels like a nuclear bomb" and that "it’s maybe the most exhilarating musical experience I have ever had, and I absolutely adore it."
