= Beauty Sleep =

2026 single by Jane Remover

Single by Jane Remover
- Released: September 23, 2026
- Genre: Hyperpop; electroclash; electropop; rawstyle
- Length: 3:43
- Label: DeadAir
- Songwriter: Jane Remover
- Producer: Jane Remover

Jane Remover singles chronology
"Music Baby" / "Experimental Skin / How to Teleport" (2026)	"Beauty Sleep" (2026)

"Beauty Sleep" is a song by the American musician Jane Remover. It was released by DeadAir Records on September 23, 2026, with an accompanying music video directed by Brendon Burton. It is a hyperpop and electroclash song that is built on distorted textures and shares an emotional tone. Remover wrote, produced, mixed, and recorded the track.

On June 4, Remover first previewed a snippet of "Beauty Sleep" during her Live Exhibit Tour in New York, as one of various unreleased tracks played by them throughout the tour. They initially stated that it would not be on their upcoming album nor released as a single but changed their mind later. In anticipation of the single, Remover updated their Spotify bio and shared its lyrics on X.

Its music video shows Remover being experimented on by a team of scientists before escaping on a motorcycle. "Beauty Sleep" received critical acclaim from music critics upon its release, praising its melodic production and commenting that it would be the start of a new era from Remover. The song was included by Alternative Press, Pitchfork, and The New York Times as one of the best singles of the week.

== Background and release ==
Jane Remover remained active in 2026, releasing "Headbanger" and "Conversion 2" on their SoundCloud, as well as music under Leroy and Venturing. In the summer and fall of 2026, Jane Remover had been embarking on their Live Exhibit tour, which began on June 4 and concluded on October 7.

During their Live Exhibit Tour, Remover played snippets of unreleased songs, one of which included "Beauty Sleep". It was first previewed in New York on June 4, which later became a fan favorite followed by requests for Remover to release the song. They initially stated that it would not appear on their upcoming album nor release as a single. However, Remover changed their mind later that summer in which she disclosed that the song "should have its own special moment". While in Europe, Remover repeatedly listened to "Beauty Sleep" daily and wanted to "turn this into an album."

Following a lack of updates on "Beauty Sleep" for a few months, Remover updated their Spotify bio with a lyric from the song and shared its lyrics on X. On September 21, they announced the release of "Beauty Sleep" as a single and a music video on September 23 at 9am PST. The song was released by DeadAir Records and the music video was made available to YouTube. Its cover art references Mewtwo's laboratory scene from the film Pokémon: The First Movie (1998), of which he breaks free from the test tube to "wreak havoc upon the scientists who created it."

== Music and lyrics ==
Remover wrote, produced, mixed, and performed "Beauty Sleep". It is a hyperpop, electroclash, electropop, and rawstyle song built around "disorienting synths, the unrelenting crush of electronic cymbal crashes, and the heavy pulse of four-on-the-floor bass drum." The song begins in a soft and emotional tone with lyrics such as, "you came to me in a dream" before exploding into a familiar, overpowering sound from Remover. Towards the end of the song, Remover screams out a refrain of "boy, you know it starts and it ends with me" before slowing down to how it opened.

== Critical reception ==
"Beauty Sleep" received critical acclaim from music critics. Tom Breihan of Stereogum praised the song, considering it to be "sweetly melodic", vulnerable, and a "dizzy, overwhelming piece of music." The Michigan Daily writer Mae Savage noticed that the song marks a new era for Remover's artistic style and that it didn't sound similar to their previous work. However, she noticed a connection to the track "Crowdkilling 101" from Status Update Music (2026), an album released under their dariacore alias Leroy.

Riley Basile of Melodic noted that "Beauty Sleep" served as a "perfect introduction" to a new musical era from Remover. She particularly praised the song's ending, comparing it to Remover's similar approach of screaming in their live performances. Two days following its release, Alternative Press listed "Beauty Sleep" as one of the "very best songs from the past week", adding it to its "A-Sides" playlist that rotates each Friday. Similarly, on September 28, Pitchfork staff included the song on their "Selects" playlist. The New York Times writer Jon Pareles included "Beauty Sleep" as one of the ten songs of the week.

== Music video ==
The music video for "Beauty Sleep" was directed by Brendon Burton and released the same day as the single. The music video features Remover as a "glamorous alien in a laboratory tube" being experimented on by a group of scientists. As they sing "You're the closest thing to human perfection", Remover escapes from the facility and rides a motorcycle toward the ocean. In conceptualizing the music video, Remover sent a mood board to Burton before the latter wrote a narrative from it. Initially, Remover didn't want to release "Beauty Sleep" as they personally felt discouraged from releasing music, but decided for it to be released "just to see how many people wanted the song to come out". Remover considered Burton as one of the few people they trusted in creative partnerships due to their similar knowledge and taste in movies, art, and internet references. When Burton mentioned Perfect Blue (1997), Remover felt excited, having wanted to reference it for years.

The music video is described as retro-futuristic and takes influence from science fiction and anime, including Pokémon, Akira, and Stalker. As Burton wanted to bring these styles together, he worked with a set designed and a VFX team to detail the song's visual world "into an even more fantastical setting." Remover wanted the concept to give a "prototype" feeling as they conceptualized "Beauty Sleep" early before any other material for their next project. During the music video's production, Remover was "secretly kinda scared" about being in a tube. However, they found out they could breathe and reflected that the water was warm it eliminated their hair dye. Remover described the experience as "serene", as they haven't went swimming in years. In addition, they wanted the "lab rat" concept to reflect their experience in the Live Exhibit Tour as a sense of being "viewed as non-human in a literal and artistic sense."

== Personnel ==
Credits are adapted from Tidal.

- Jane Remover – vocals, writing, production, mixing
