= Magic I Want U =

2024 single by Jane Remover

- Original cover (Note: During October 2024, the digital artwork was changed to the "Flash in the Pan" cover.)

Single by Jane Remover

from the EP Heart
- B-side: "How to Teleport"
- Released: September 4, 2024
- Recorded: 2024
- Genre: Pop; emo; R&B
- Length: 4:58
- Label: DeadAir
- Songwriter: Jane Remover
- Producer: Jane Remover

Jane Remover singles chronology
"Flash in the Pan" / "Dream Sequence" (2024)	"Magic I Want U" / "How to Teleport" (2024)	"JRJRJR" (2025)

"Magic I Want U" is a song by the American musician Jane Remover. It was released by DeadAir Records on September 4, 2024, along with its B-side "How to Teleport". It was written, performed, and mixed by Remover. Following two tracks released in July 2024, it was released while they were touring with JPEGMafia. It is a pop, emo, and R&B track that draws from a variety of other genres. It is characterized by a mixture of instruments and sounds, including fuzzy guitars, skittering breakbeats, synthesizers, drums, trap chants, and air horns. Its lyrics discuss a crush that they have on another musician, as well as sexual desire. "Magic I Want U" was met with positive reviews from critics; it was considered one of the best songs of the year by Pitchfork and Anthony Fantano, while Paste included it in their mid-decade list.

== Background and release ==
Following the release of their second studio album, Census Designated, in October 2023, Jane Remover released the tracks "Flash in the Pan" and "Dream Sequence" in July 2024. They also opened for JPEGMafia's North American tour during 2024. The single "Magic I Want U" was released by DeadAir Records on September 4, 2024, along with its B-side "How to Teleport"; it was written, performed, and mixed by Remover. "Magic I Want U" was originally intended for an album recorded by Remover in 2024; they decided not to release it, stating that it would have turned them into the "main pop girl", which they did not want.

== Composition ==
"Magic I Want U"
"Magic I Want U" contains multiple sound effects and instruments, as well as lyrics discussing sexual desire.

"Magic I Want U" is 4 minutes and 58 seconds long; it is a pop, emo, and R&B song that draws from a variety of genres, such as hyperpop, Latin music, 1990s hip-hop, EDM, and digicore. Its production contains fuzzy guitars, synthesizer hooks, drums, and skittering breakbeats; Pitchfork's Mano Sundaresan compared the latter to the work of Dijon. He believed the use of trap chants and air horns serve as a reminder of Remover's "Internet-rap roots". Paste's Leah Weinstein described the song's synthesizers as reminiscent of Bladee, while Tom Breihan from Stereogum described the song as "a million things happening at once". Jason Lipshutz, writing for Billboard, likened the removal of the song's elements to a Jenga tower. Juan Velasquez of Them wrote that the track "took [their] melancholy hyperpop shoegaze to a whole new level"; he also called the track "confident", "flirty", and "danceable", and mentioned how it is reminiscent of Total Request Live-era love songs. Its hook is grunge-inspired, and the song finishes with a Miami bass coda; the song was written about a crush that Remover has on another musician and sexual desire. Sundaresan called their vocals "big" and "complex", and compared them to K-pop vocals.

== Critical reception ==
"Magic I Want U" was met with positive reviews from critics; it was awarded the "Best New Track" accolade from Pitchfork, Sundaresan described Remover as "more confident than ever" and called them an "emo mad scientist, channeling the vastness of [their] growing palette into raw feeling". Grant Sharples of Uproxx said the track "sounds like typical Jane Remover, which is invariably great", but also commented on how it sonically changes its course simultaneously, and thought it is one of Remover's strongest tracks yet. Konstantinos Pappis from Our Culture Mag named it one of the best songs of its release week, calling it "slinky" and "ecstatic". The track ranked 90th in a year-end readers poll published by Pitchfork. In an unranked list of the best LGBTQ+ songs of the year, Velasquez said: "Let's hope "Magic I Want U" is a hint of what the singer/producer has in store for us in 2025". Billboard included the song in their list of "20 Pop Songs from 2024 That Deserved to Be Smashes"; Lipshutz praised it, alongside Remover's other 2024 singles, for being "obsessed with the finely manicured details of pop music, and how they can be deconstructed".

"Magic I Want U" was placed in year-end lists from Pitchfork and Anthony Fantano, as well as in a mid-decade list by Paste. Pitchfork considered it the 10th best song of the year. Author Meaghan Garvey lauded its mix of instruments, and called it the best of the singles Remover released in 2024; she also mentioned how it "transcends past niches and simply gives us a hit". Fantano ranked it the 45th best song of the year and called it a "sharp piece of Internet pop". Paste thought it was the 85th best song of the decade so far; Weinstein mentioned how Remover's music "has become more and more difficult to describe" and wrote that their production "diverts your attention to something new every single second". She concluded by writing, "Jane Remover makes it clear [they] [refuse] to be put in a box—and if you try, [they'll] go ahead and make that impossible, too".
