= Prostitute (band) =

American noise rock band

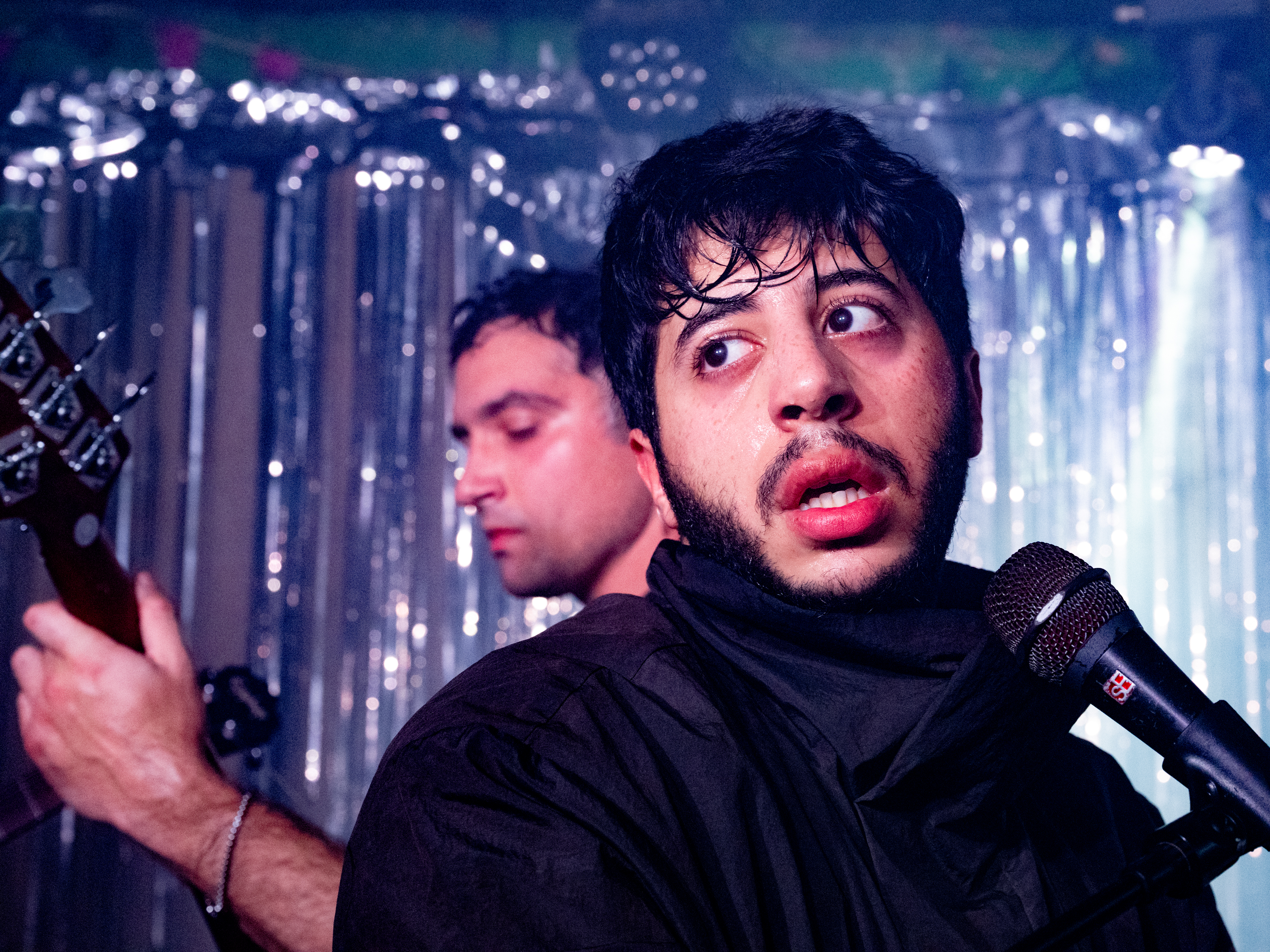
- Prostitute performing in Brixton in 2025

Background information
- Origin: Dearborn, Michigan, U.S.
- Genres: Noise rock; post-hardcore; hardcore punk
- Years active: 2020–present
- Label: Mute
- Members: Moe Kazra; Andrew Kaster; Ross Babinski; Bret Wall; Dylan Zaranski
- Website: attemptedmartyr.com

Prostitute is an American noise rock band from Dearborn, Michigan. The band was co-founded by vocalist Moe Kazra and drummer Andrew Kaster, and also includes guitarists Ross Babinski and Bret Wall, and bassist Dylan Zaranski.

The group released its debut album, Attempted Martyr, in October 2024. In December 2025, Prostitute signed to Mute Records.

== History ==
Prostitute was formed in 2020 in Dearborn, Michigan. The band self-released their debut album, Attempted Martyr, on October 20, 2024. The album was generally received positively. Nina Corcoran, in a review for Pitchfork, wrote that the album "is remarkably polished" and rated it a 7.8/10.0. Devin Birse of POST-TRASH wrote positively of the album, commenting that the "[c]onstant reaction against the horrors of the modern world leads to a beautiful dynamic unfolding across the album."

In December 2025, Prostitute signed to Mute Records, with further announcement that Attempted Martyr would be reissued for CD and vinyl release, and that the band would begin its first European tour in spring 2026. Along with the announcement, they released a video for their single "Mr. Dada".

== Musical style ==
Prostitute is generally considered a noise rock band. The vocalist Kazra has cited Black Midi, Swans and Death Grips as influences. Additionally, the band's work takes influence from Arab music. The band's music has been described as having an "all-pervasive heaviness... and borderline deranged vocal delivery.

Kazra's personal experiences with anti-Arab racism have influenced the group’s work, with Kaster stating their performances "are a theatricalization of terrorism". Band members have also cited the War on Terror, Israel's attacks on Lebanon and the broader trend of Western destabilization of the Middle East as political influences. Their debut album, Attempted Martyr, also heavily features religious influences, with the band describing the album as about a character "who thinks he's God" but is "actually in service of... ego and gluttony."

== Discography ==
=== Studio albums ===
- Attempted Martyr (2024)

=== Singles ===
- "Judge" (2023)
- "All Hail" (2024)
- "Mr. Dada" (2025)
