= Ghostholding =

Studio album by Venturing
- Released: February 14, 2025
- Recorded: September 25, 2024 – January 9, 2025
- Genres: Rock, avant-rock, indie rock
- Length: 51:08
- Label: DeadAir
- Producer: Jane Remover

Venturing chronology
Arizona (2023)	Ghostholding (2025)	Nowhere (2026)

Jane Remover chronology
Census Designated (2023)	Ghostholding (2025)	Revengeseekerz (2025)

Singles from Ghostholding
- 1. "Sister" Released: September 26, 2024; 2. "Halloween" Released: October 31, 2024; 3. "Famous Girl" Released: December 5, 2024; 4. "Dead Forever" Released: January 9, 2025

Ghostholding is the debut studio album by Venturing, a side project of the American musician Jane Remover. It was released by DeadAir Records on February 14, 2025. The album was written by Remover between 2022 and 2024. They also recorded, produced, and mixed it from September 2024 to January 2025, concurrently with the third album under their main name, Revengeseekerz. Four singles—"Sister", "Halloween", "Famous Girl", and "Dead Forever"—accompanied Ghostholding.

Mainly drawing from rock, avant-rock, and indie rock, Ghostholding employs emo guitar riffs, elevating melodies, reverb, and impassioned vocals in its mix. Its lyrics continue Remover's interest in long roads and empty spaces, which was present in their earlier music. The album received positive reviews from music critics with particular praise for its melodies and emotions, though its mixing drew some criticism. Commercially, Ghostholding peaked at number 23 on the North American College and Community Radio Chart (NACC).

== Background and release ==
Jane Remover began releasing tracks under the alias Venturing in 2022. Initially, the public—and music publications—believed it was a continuation of the fictional indie rock band story from South Dakota created by Remover that was active in the 1990s and later re-discovered. Remover later clarified that the project's backstory had been canceled as they no longer wanted to keep up with it, but miscommunication implied that the story was fabricated and spread by fans, never having existed in the first place. This led Stereogum to issue a correction. In May 2023, Remover released the project's debut extended play (EP), Arizona, which contained four tracks.

The recording of Venturing's debut album, Ghostholding, occurred simultaneously with the recording of Remover's third album, Revengeseekerz. Remover wrote the album track "Sister" a long time before creating the album; it was also the first song they recorded after coming back home from touring with JPEGMafia. Remover wrote the album between 2022 and 2024, and recorded, produced, and mixed it from September 2024 to January 2025. The album was mastered for vinyl by Moa.

The lead single of Ghostholding, "Sister", was released on September 26, 2024. It was followed by "Halloween" on October 31. Ghostholding, as well as its cover artwork and track list, were announced on December 5, alongside the release of its third single, "Famous Girl". Its fourth and final single, "Dead Forever", released on January 9, 2025. The album was released by DeadAir Records on February 14, 2025. Ghostholding peaked at number 23 on the North American College and Community Radio Chart (NACC) dated March 18, 2025.

The vinyl version of the album contains the entirety of the Arizona EP along with re-recordings of "Cream Soda" titled "Cream Soda '24" and "Dream Sequence" which was previously released under Jane Remover's main pseudonym and bonus track "If you treat her."

Later on in the year, on July 23rd, 2025, Jane Remover would post a demo under venturing titled "In the dark (demo)" on SoundCloud initially stating that it was a "demo from like March I can't finish this," before ultimately announcing via X (formerly Twitter) that they would finish the track which would later be released on February 13th, 2026 around the one year anniversary of Ghostholding and silently added as a bonus track on the Bandcamp release of the album.

== Composition ==
=== Overview ===
Music journalists described Ghostholding as a rock, avant-rock, and indie rock album with influences of emo, slowcore, and shoegaze. The album employs emo guitar riffs, elevating melodies, reverb, and impassioned vocals in its mix. Multiple journalists observed similarities between Ghostholding and Census Designated, Remover's second album released under their main name. Lyrically, Ghostholding continues Remover's interest in long roads and empty spaces, as first explored on Census Designated. Remover stretches their voice across measures and alters their vocal delivery across the album. The second half of numerous songs feature loud guitars and drums.

Pitchfork's Sasha Geffen likened the album's blend of guitar riffs and introspective singing to Midwest emo music and wrote that "occasional shoegaze blasts" are scattered across the album. They (Note: Geffen uses they/them pronouns.) also wrote how Remover sings to people, places, and feelings that seem to possibly disappear in the album's lyrics. Andrew Sacher of BrooklynVegan said the album "bridges the gap between post-internet modernism and '90s revival" more than Remover's main albums do. He also observed how the album could not have existed in the 1990s, due to its production and vocal style. Similarly, Steve Erickson for Gay City News identified the album as sounding like "one person's creation on a laptop, not the work of a live band". The New Yorker's Sheldon Pearce described Remover's music under the Venturing alias as "emo-leaning".

=== Songs ===
The opening track of Ghostholding is "Play My Guitar", which is followed by "No Sleep", a track that contains restless drumming and a cowbell that builds tension within the song. Geffen felt the line "I believe everything, do you believe in me?" in "Believe" holds emotional weight depending on whether or not the answer to the line is "yes". "Guesthouse" features stretched-out lead vocals and softer backing vocals, which creates a vocal mix that clashes "rather than harmonize", per Erickson. "Spider" opens with a slow guitar and a faint noise, and builds to a dense, aggressive sound with echo effects and a hazy effect. The song's notes blend into one another; Erickson said the "indistinct mix suggests half-recalled memories". "Recoil" is a 1990s-reminiscent rock and roll track that features tense drums and guitar riffs. On "Something Has to Change", Remover begs "Please, God, save me", before their voice builds into a loud roar. The online music critic Anthony Fantano likened the first part of "Dead Forever" to "Smashing Pumpkins worship" and stated that the song develops into melodies that grow past the song's lo-fi mixing. Erickson felt "Sick / Relapse" took its "indistinct mix" to the record's "furthest extreme". "Famous Girl" presents clean vocals atop distorted guitars and bouncy percussion; The Fader's David Renshaw observed similarities to 1980s-inspired pop rock by Mk.gee or the 1975 in the song. Similarly, Abby Jones of Stereogum said its guitars "float between lo-fi jangle and a Mk.gee-style groove". The track also sees Remover singing "Feel like a runaway dreamer runaway dreaming" with energetic vocals. Jones described "Famous Girl", as well as the tracks "Halloween" and "Sister", as "dreamy" and "very lo-fi".

== Critical reception ==
Professional ratings
Review scores
Source	Rating
The Needle Drop	7/10 (Note: Specifically, Fantano rated the album a "decent 7".)
Pitchfork	7.9/10

Ghostholding received a positive review from Pitchfork upon its release. Geffen called it "an album full of sprawling, fearsome beauty" and considered it an improvement over Remover's previous rock music. They also felt its emo-influenced sound allowed Remover to write "the most daring vocal melodies they've written". In a review for BrooklynVegan, Sacher said the album has "surface level era-specific traits" but called its emotions "timeless". Fantano called the tracks "consistent" and, while he felt its mixing was messy, he considered the album an improvement over Census Designated. Konstantinos Pappis of Our Culture Mag said the album has "some of [Remover's] most explosive vocals to date". Uproxx's Grant Sharples named Ghostholding one of the best indie albums from its release week; he said it exists in "a parallel universe in which Jane kept pursuing rock's outer edges", alluding to the rap and hyperpop sound of Revengeseekerz. In a less enthusiastic review for Gay City News, Erickson stated that the album shows its 1990s indie rock influences more clearly than Arizona. He also said the album "brings up images of a grey, overcast sky", criticized its "muddy" production, and considered it a downgrade when compared to Census Designated. The staff at The Fader and Stereogum deemed "Famous Girl" one of the best tracks of its release week. Similarly, the staff of BrooklynVegan named "Believe" one of their favorite tracks from its week of release.

== Track listing ==
All tracks are written by Jane Remover.

Ghostholding track listing
No.	Title	Length
1.	"Play My Guitar"	3:30
2.	"No Sleep"	3:20
3.	"Believe"	3:39
4.	"Guesthouse"	3:58
5.	"Spider"	4:18
6.	"Recoil"	3:22
7.	"Something Has to Change"	3:19
8.	"Dead Forever"	4:03
9.	"We Don't Exist"	4:15
10.	"Sick / Relapse"	5:22
11.	"Famous Girl"	3:54
12.	"Halloween"	3:37
13.	"Sister"	4:31
Total length:		51:08

All tracks are written by Jane Remover.

Digital re-release on Bandcamp
No.	Title	Length
14.	"In the Dark"	4:01
Total length:		55:09

Physical release (Note: Contains all tracks from Arizona. "Dream Sequence" was previously released under Jane Remover.)
No.	Title	Length
14.	"Stand-Up Donor"	1:36
15.	"Cream Soda"	2:39
16.	"Vulture City"	2:36
17.	"I Love My Friends"	2:26
18.	"Dream Sequence"	4:10
19.	"If You Treat Her"	2:32
Total length:		67:07

=== Notes ===
- All tracks are stylized in sentence case.
- "Stand-Up Donor" is stylized as "Stand-up donor".
- Some tracks are given secondary titles in the album's liner notes, preceded by "a.k.a."
  - "Spider" is given the title "My Love Is a Thousand Waves".
  - "Something Has to Change" is given the title "Next to Me / Girl Code".
  - "Dead Forever" is given the title "D/C".
  - "Sister" is given the title "Jewel Box".

== Personnel ==
Credits adapted from the album's liner notes and Tidal.

- Jane Remover – vocals, bass, drums, guitar, production, recording, mixing
- Moa – vinyl mastering

== Charts ==
Chart performance for Ghostholding
Chart (2025)	Peak position
US & Canadian College Radio Top 200 (NACC)	23
