= DeadAir Records =

American independent record label

deadAir Records
- Founded: 2021
- Founder: Billie Bugara; Jesse Taconelli
- Status: Active
- Distributors: Stem Disintermedia; AWAL (2022; only Quadeca); Sony (2025; only Quannnic); Atlantic (2026-present; Jane Remover, Lucy Bedroque and Kuru)
- Genre: Electronic; hip hop; experimental; hyperpop; shoegaze; indietronica; digicore
- Country of origin: United States
- Official website: deadairrecords.com

DeadAir Records (stylized as deadAir) is an American independent record label co-founded in November of 2021 by Jesse Taconelli and Billie Bugara. PAPER identified Bugara as a co-founder, while Hypebeast and music-industry publication RAMP identified Taconelli as a co-founder. In a 2022 first-person retrospective, Bugara wrote that an earlier label experiment led Bugara and Taconelli to start their own label.

In addition to physical releases of their music, deadAir also designs and sells merchandise for its artists.

== History ==
Bugara's background included writing for the online publication Underground Vampire Club and serving as its editor-in-chief. In the retrospective, Bugara described how that publication's short-lived label experiment preceded the formation of deadAir. No Bells credited Bugara's SoundCloud Digicore playlist with helping codify the emerging digicore scene.

deadAir's first numbered catalog release was Jane Remover's 2021 album Frailty. Pitchfork described the record as an ambitious expansion of digicore and later ranked it number 33 on its list of the 100 best albums of the 2020s through 2024. In 2022, Bugara co-presented a showcase at Baby's All Right in Brooklyn; PAPER described deadAir at the time as an independent label associated with influential digicore acts.

Other independently reviewed deadAir releases included Jane Remover's Census Designated in 2023, Kuru's re:wired in 2024, Venturing's Ghostholding in 2025, and By Storm's My Ghosts Go Ghost in 2026. In a 2024 profile, Alternative Press described deadAir as a young label that foregrounded inventive, boundary-pushing acts.

== Activities ==
The label describes itself as multidisciplinary. Its official website maintains separate pages for its numbered release catalog, management clients, and publishing clients. Since 2025, NTS Radio has hosted deadAir – Transmissions, a monthly program featuring label-associated musicians and guests.

== Artists released ==
=== Current ===
Act	Years on the label	Releases under the label
Jane Remover	2021-present (Note: As of 2026 with the release of the single "Beauty Sleep", Jane Remover's releases are co-distributed with Atlantic Records.)	7 (Note: Includes two releases under the Venturing alias.)
Dazegxd	2022–present	5
Kuru	2024-present (Note: As of 2026 with the release of the single "Blink2/Point&Click", Kuru's releases are co-distributed with Atlantic Records.)	3
Operelly	2025-present	2
Lucy Bedroque	2025-present (Note: As of 2026 with the release of the album C, Lucy Bedroque's releases are co-distributed with Atlantic Records.)	3
Photographic Memory	2025-present	1
Kmoe	2025-present	1
By Storm	2026-present	1
heavensouls	2026-present	0
Juno	2026-present	0

=== Former ===
Act	Years on the label	Releases under the label
Osquinn (Note: As Quinn; cofounder)	2021-2023	3
Quadeca	2022–2024 (Note: Exclusively in 2022 with the release of the album I Didn't Mean to Haunt You, Quadeca's releases were co-distributed with AWAL.)	3
Quannnic	2023–2025 (Note: The release of the album Warbrained was co-distributed with Sony Music.)	3
Underscores (Note: Underscores is signed to Mom + Pop, but partnered with deadAir for a physical release of Fishmonger.)	2025	1
Prostitute (Note: Prostitute partnered with deadAir for a physical release of Attempted Martyr, and later signed to Mute Records.)	2025	1
Ninajirachi (Note: Ninajirachi is signed to NLV Music, which partnered with deadAir for a physical release of I Love My Computer.)	2025	1
Racing Mount Pleasant (Note: Racing Mount Pleasant is signed to R&R, but partnered with deadAir for a physical release of Grip Your Fist, I'm Heaven Bound.)	2025	1

== Discography ==
=== Studio albums ===
Year	Title	Artist(s)	Formats and notes	Ref(s).
2021	Drive-By Lullabies	Quinn	Digital re-release	
2022	Frailty	Jane Remover	Digital, CD, cassette, vinyl (Note: Following Jane Remover's name change, the album was first re-issued in 2022, while 2023 saw the release of Frailty on vinyl.)	
2022	vKiSS	Dazegxd	Digital, CD	
2022	Quinn	Quinn	Digital, CD	
2022	I Didn't Mean to Haunt You (Note: Released alongside AWAL.)	Quadeca	Digital, CD, cassette, vinyl	
2023	Kenopsia	Quannnic	Digital re-release, CD, vinyl (Note: Kenopsia was originally self-released in 2022. In early 2023, it was announced that Quannnic had been signed to deadAir, and the album was re-released digitally and later issued on vinyl for the first time through deadAir.)	
2023	Census Designated	Jane Remover	Digital, CD, vinyl	
2023	Stepdream	Quannnic	Digital, vinyl	
2024	Exhibition Mode	Dazegxd	Digital, CD	
2024	Re:Wired	Kuru	Digital, CD	
2024	From Me to You	Quadeca	CD, cassette (Note: From Me to You was originally released under AWAL in 2021. In 2024, deadAir issued the album on CD and cassette alongside I Didn't Mean to Haunt You and Scrapyard.)	
2025	Fishmonger	Underscores	CD & vinyl reissue (deadAir Legacy Edition)	
2025	Ghostholding	Venturing	Digital, CD, vinyl	
2025	Attempted Martyr	Prostitute	Vinyl (Note: Attempted Martyr was originally self-released in 2024. In 2025, deadAir announced that they worked together with Prostitute to sell merch from the band and release the album on vinyl.)	
2025	Revengeseekerz	Jane Remover	Digital, CD, vinyl	
2025	I Look at Her and Light Goes All Through Me	Photographic Memory	Digital	
2025	K1	Kmoe	Digital, CD, vinyl	
2025	Warbrained (Note: Released alongside Sony Music.)	Quannnic	Digital, CD, vinyl	
2025	I Love My Computer	Ninajirachi	Vinyl (Note: deadAir partnered with NLV Records for this release.)	
2025	Grip Your Fist, I'm Heaven Bound	Racing Mount Pleasant	Vinyl (Note: Grip Your Fist, I'm Heaven Bound was originally self-released in 2022, while the band was still going by the name Kingfisher. In 2025, the album was reissued on vinyl under the name Racing Mount Pleasant by deadAir.)	
2026	My Ghosts Go Ghost	By Storm	Digital, CD, vinyl	
2026	Backstage Hologram	Kuru	Digital, CD, vinyl	
2026	C (Note: Released alongside Atlantic Records.)	Lucy Bedroque	Digital, CD, cassette, vinyl	

=== Compilation albums ===
Year	Title	Artist(s)	Formats and notes	Ref(s).
2025	Sororite (Note: Sororite is a compilation of Lucy Bedroque's debut album Sisterhood, as well as the EPs Féte de la Vanille and Amy, all of which were originally self-released on digital platforms by Bedroque themself under Autosarco Musique.)	Lucy Bedroque	CD, vinyl	

=== Mixtapes ===
Year	Title	Artist(s)	Formats and notes	Ref(s).
2024	Scrapyard	Quadeca	Digital, CD, cassette, vinyl	
2025	Unmusique	Lucy Bedroque	Digital, CD, vinyl	
2025	Stay True Forever	Kuru	Digital, CD	
2025	Daze's Game 3!	Dazegxd	Digital re-release (Note: Daze's Game 3! was originally released in 2021. After briefly being taken off streaming platforms for unknown reasons in May 2025, it was re-released digitally via deadAir later that same month.)	

=== EPs ===
Year	Title	Artist(s)	Formats and notes	Ref(s).
2022	Teen Week	Jane Remover	Digital re-release (abridged version) (Note: Teen Week was originally self-released as an 8-track EP in 2021. Following Jane Remover's name change in 2022, an abridged 4-track version of the EP was released digitally via deadAir.)	
2023	dSX.fm	Dazegxd & Quinn	Digital, CD	
2023	Scrapyard I	Quadeca	Digital	
2023	Scrapyard II	Quadeca	Digital	
2023	Scrapyard III	Quadeca	Digital	
2025	Handwriting Practice No. 1	Operelly	Digital	
2025	TellMeWhatToSwallow	Photographic Memory	Digital	
2025	Heart	Jane Remover	Digital, CD, vinyl	
2026	*Flutters Away*	Operelly	Digital, CD, vinyl	
2026	Nowhere EP	Venturing	Digital, vinyl	

=== Singles ===
The following list excludes singles which are released in the rollout of and included on an album or mixtape for legibility.

Year	Title	Artist(s)	Formats and notes	Ref(s).
2022	"Royal Blue Walls"	Jane Remover	Digital	
2023	"Vete"	Kuru	Digital	
2024	"Flash in the Pan"	Jane Remover	Digital	
2024	"Magic I Want U"	Jane Remover	Digital	
2025	"Supernova" (featuring Funeral)	Jane Remover	Digital	
2025	"Dreamflasher"	Jane Remover	Digital	
2025	"Audio Diary"	Kuru	Digital	
2026	"And I Dance"	By Storm	Digital	
2026	"Speed Demon"	Lucy Bedroque	Digital	
2026	"Whitehorsemannequin"	Lucy Bedroque	Digital	
