= D0llywood1 =

- D0llywood1 performing in 2026

Background information
- Born: Kimberly Sommers; December 2, 2003 (age 22); New Orleans, Louisiana, U.S.
- Genre: Digicore
- Occupations: Rapper; record producer; songwriter
- Instruments: Vocals, guitar
- Years active: 2019–present

Kimberly Sommers (born December 2, 2003), known professionally as D0llywood1 (stylized in lowercase), is an American rapper, record producer and singer from Louisiana who gained virality online in the digicore scene. She would release her second mixtape This Is Just a Dream (and Soon I Will Awake) (2024), and later co-headline an American tour with Jane Remover.

== Personal life ==
D0llywood1 is transgender. She currently attends college in New Orleans.

== Discography ==
=== Mixtapes ===
Title	Mixtape details
This Is Just a Dream (and Soon I Will Awake)	Released: June 28, 2024; Label: Self-released; Format: Digital download, streaming

=== Singles ===
==== As featured artist ====
Title	Year	Album
"Line Sayer" (with Twikipedia)	2022	Chronic
Dead Men (with 800pts)	2022	Non-album single
