= Kmoe =

Canadian singer-songwriter (born 2004)

- Kmoe performing in November 2025

Background information
- Born: Kale Moses Itkonen; July 22, 2004 (age 22); Vancouver, British Columbia
- Genres: Hyperpop; Digicore; Shoegaze
- Occupations: Singer-songwriter; Producer
- Years active: 2014–present
- Label: DeadAir Records
- Website: kmoe.industries

Kale Moses Itkonen (born July 22, 2004), known professionally as Kmoe (stylized in all-lowercase) is a Canadian singer-songwriter and producer. Born in Vancouver, British Columbia, Itkonen began creating EDM tracks using GarageBand at age 9 before joining the DIY hyperpop music scene. He is signed to DeadAir Records, and is best known for his collaborations with artists such as Jane Remover, Ericdoa, Quannnic, and Quadeca.

== Life and career ==
Itkonen was born in Vancouver, British Columbia, and began making music on GarageBand at 9 years old. Taking inspiration from EDM artists like Deadmau5, Itkonen released his first song "Invincible" on SoundCloud in 2014 under the name Kmoethekid. He would spend the next 5 years releasing unofficial remixes and instrumental tracks, before independently releasing his debut EP "an internet love story" to Spotify on May 15, 2019, eventually removing the project from streaming platforms.

Later in 2019, Itkonen began collaborating with other hyperpop and digicore artists as part of the artist collective Noheart. On March 29, 2020, he released his second EP Flutter, before eventually removing all but four tracks from streaming services. The project featured the song "Iced Tea," a laid back alt-pop record that showcased Itkonen's versatility and was well-received critically. In October 2020, Itkonen began working with the producer collective FROMTHEHEART. He contributed the chorus to the track "Get Used To It" and appeared alongside Ericdoa, Glaive, and Brakence, on the collective's unreleased second album Well, We Made It This Far! In 2021, Itkonen released the song "Wide Eyes" featuring Jane Remover, and would also appear as the only featured artist on their 2021 EP Teen Week, appearing on the fan favorite track "Homeswitcher".

Itkonen signed with DeadAir Records for the release of his highly anticipated debut Album K1 which was released on June 6, 2025. The album was a critical success and was praised for its ability to blend electronic and shoegaze elements. After the release of the album, Itkonen would join Quannnic on their tour across the United States and Canada, later supporting Quadeca for the remainder of his Vanisher, Horizon Scraper tour in the Fall of 2025.

== Discography ==
=== Studio albums ===
Title	Album details
K1	Released: June 6, 2025; Label: DeadAir; Format: LP, CD, digital download, streaming
