= Frailty (Jane Remover album) =

2021 studio album by Jane Remover

- Standard cover

Studio album by Jane Remover
- Released: November 12, 2021
- Recorded: 2021
- Studios: Remover's childhood bedroom (New Jersey, United States)
- Genres: Electronic; emo; glitch pop; indie rock; digicore; shoegaze; indietronica; progressive pop
- Length: 57:03
- Label: DeadAir
- Producer: Jane Remover

Jane Remover chronology
Dariacore 2: Enter Here, Hell to the Left (2021)	Frailty (2021)	Dariacore 3... At Least I Think That's What It's Called? (2022)

Jane Remover studio album chronology
Frailty (2021)	Census Designated (2023)

Singles from Frailty
- 1. "How to Lie" Released: June 23, 2021; 2. "Pretender" Released: August 9, 2021; 3. "Search Party" Released: October 13, 2021; 4. "Misplace" Released: November 13, 2026

Frailty is the debut studio album by the American musician Jane Remover. It was released by DeadAir Records on November 12, 2021, under Remover's former name Dltzk, before they changed their stage name in 2022. Remover began recording the album in their childhood bedroom in New Jersey halfway through their senior year of high school and worked on it during their summer vacation. They produced the entire album themselves using music production software and an acoustic guitar. They were inspired by numerous video game soundtracks, musicians, and the New Jersey setting for material on the record. They intended the album to sound fuzzy, like a video game soundtrack for the Nintendo DS, and achieved this by using a bitcrusher.

Music critics described Frailty as being a wide variety of genres, such as electronic, emo, glitch pop, indie rock, digicore, shoegaze, indietronica, and progressive pop, and felt it was influenced by a myriad of other genres. Nearly every track is built around a guitar and the album employs distortion, yearnful vocals, and synthesizers in its soundscape. Frailty is a coming of age record that focuses on adolescent feelings, personal struggles, and fleeting time. Its artwork is a grainy and JPEG-compressed screenshot of a house in Oklahoma Remover took from Google Street View while making the album. Frailty was promoted by four singles—"How to Lie", "Pretender", and "Search Party"—throughout 2021 and "Misplace" in 2026.

Frailty received critical acclaim and widened the size of Remover's audience; music critics had particular praise for the album's blend of genres and styles. Frailty was placed in year-end lists of best music by Pitchfork, the online music critic Anthony Fantano, and Paste. Both Paste and Pitchfork also included it in their mid-decade lists of best music. Since its release, Remover has distanced themselves from Frailty and considers it the work of another person, due to their gender transition. This led to a more serious artistic approach on their following album, Census Designated (2023). For the album's five-year anniversary, Remover released a deluxe version of the album, featuring four new tracks and one track previously included only on the album's vinyl version.

== Background ==
Jane Remover was introduced to music production after listening to a Skrillex song on YouTube in 2011. By 2014, they began producing music similar to that of Porter Robinson in GarageBand. By middle school and high school, they became interested in musicians and groups such as Brockhampton, Odd Future, and Trippie Redd and began producing music akin to their styles in FL Studio. By this time, they had also become interested in vaporwave. In early 2020, Remover started creating digicore music and later released their debut extended play (EP), Teen Week, in February 2021. It was released to critical praise; The Line of Best Fit considered it one of the best hyperpop releases of all time in 2022, while Paste named it one of the greatest EPs of all time in 2024. Business Insider's Kieran Press-Reynolds called the EP Remover's "first major break".

== Writing and production ==
Remover began recording their debut album, Frailty, almost a year after recording Teen Week. They recorded the album in their childhood bedroom in New Jersey over the span of six to seven months, starting halfway through their senior year of high school. After their parents "instantly shut down" the idea to take a year off of school to pursue music, Remover hastened the recording of the album during the summer vacation before their freshman year of college. This was due to the fact that, by the time school would start that September, they were only able to work on it during the weekends when they came back home. Remover waited for their family to leave the house before recording vocals for the album. They produced the entire album using an acoustic guitar they found in a closet at home and a music production software; they did not previously know how to play the guitar. They recorded one string of the guitar at a time and imitated the sound of a chord by layering each note on top of one another in the production software. They preferred this method because they believed their hands were too small to play the instrument traditionally. Remover would place their phone on the guitar to record it; then, they would email the recording to themselves to edit on their computer. Retrospectively, Remover acknowledged that playing the guitar "note-by-note" and using a "learn-as-you-go" recording process unintentionally "added to the [album's] theme of picking up memories and putting them back together".

The sound of Frailty was partly inspired by the soundtracks of video games such as Pokémon Diamond and Pearl (2006), Pokémon Black and White (2010), and Undertale (2015). Remover was also influenced by musicians such as Robinson and Skrillex; they stated that, as of November 2021, their biggest inspirations were their friends. The New Jersey setting, where they recorded the album, inspired a lot of material. Remover intended for the album to sound pixelated and noisy, like a Nintendo DS video game soundtrack. Remover accomplished this by using a bitcrusher to lower the audio resolution to become "charmingly fuzzy". In a 2022 interview with Pitchfork, Remover stated that they chose the album's title as Frailty because they "think 'frailty' means both weakness in the body and the mind". A lot of the experiences depicted on the album happened "during a time when [they were] physically and mentally not well". For its writing process, they typically wrote a song's lyrics and developed a melody from them. After that, they would listen to the song and listen to it 50 times over and later think: "Wait, this line was actually really corny and I should change it." During its recording process, Remover doubted Frailty and considered it "not good enough for coverage whatsoever". On the contrary, when speaking to Press-Reynolds about the album's sound, Remover expressed that they were "finally making the music [they have] wanted to make since [they were] 9". They also wished that, if the album offers a takeaway for its listeners, it would be to "appreciate the moment".

== Composition ==
=== Overview ===
Music critics identified Frailty as being an electronic, emo, glitch pop, indie rock, digicore, shoegaze, indietronica, and progressive pop record. The album is also influenced by other genres such as hyperpop, EDM, bedroom pop, and dubstep. Remover themselves categorized the album as dariacore, a microgenre they invented. The standard version of the album contains 13 tracks and lasts nearly an hour; its vinyl release includes 2 extra tracks. Almost every track is constructed around a guitar; the album also presents lo-fi passages reminiscent of the Microphones or Alex G, according to Pitchfork's Cat Zhang. Alongside guitars, the album employs distortion, yearnful vocals, and synthesizers in its soundscape. The album presents build-ups, sudden drops, and a glitchy soundscape. The tracks "Movies for Guys", "Kodak Moment", and "Eyes Off the Wheel, I'm a Star" cycle through beat switches, ambient interludes, and dance music-inspired sonics, ending as lullabies, as described by Press-Reynolds.

Frailty is a coming of age record with lyrics that focuses on adolescent feelings, such as struggles with self-identity, sexual tension, wishes of revenge, and the belief that nothing will change. Its lyrics also discuss personal struggles and fleeting time. Remover addresses an unnamed "you" across multiple tracks that symbolizes "current and past" versions of themselves and various unidentified people. The album contains seamless transitions and is built around melancholic themes and sonic textures. Remover stated that the album's sentiment is "realizing that despite the pressure to become an adult when you turn 18, you still have so much time left". John Norris from Paper called the album a "smash 'n grab triumph of queer Gen Z bedroom confessionals". Sundaresan wrote that, under its emo and shoegaze surface, Frailty contains "small, shimmering details that reveal themselves like Easter eggs in a role-playing game". In a 2023 interview with The Fader, Remover described the album as "walking in your neighborhood the morning after you graduate high school, when it's sunny and a little bit cold".

=== Songs ===
"Search Party"
"Search Party" contains lyrics about feeling lost with music that switches between heavy distortion and minimal production.

The opening track of Frailty is "Goldfish", an emo song built around a lo-fi guitar and uses suburban imagery—such as Six Flags and tree houses—to convey a sense of yearning for another person. It is followed by "Your Clothes", which begins with a guitar riff that gradually transforms into a synthesizer melody. The rest of the track is built around angsty vocals, a synthesizer-driven hook, and a dance instrumental. "Misplace" starts as a lo-fi rock song that transitions into an 8-bit electro sequence that then builds into a wall of synthesizers, distortion, and MIDI horns. The following track, "Pretender", is influenced by indie rock. "Search Party", which drew comparisons to Alex G by music critics, begins with fuzzy vocals and acoustic strumming. As Remover softly sings about being lost and unreachable, the song's melody loops and a signal beeps. The instrumentation shifts with every verse, alternating between heavy distortion and minimal production. Pitchfork's Kelly Liu felt the music alternating between loud and quiet leaves the listener "with a sense of desperation". The track concludes with screaming and an overdriven guitar. Mano Sundaresan, also for Pitchfork, likened the effect of the guitar cutting out intermittently to a "DJ mashing the volume slider at a rave". "Buzzcut, Daisy" is a stripped-back moment on the album that features spoken word.

"Kodak Moment"
"Kodak Moment" contains a dariacore segment during its middle section and concludes with yearnful pianos.

"Movies for Guys" is driven by a bitcrushed guitar and begins as a pop song about a love interest who does not accept Remover for who they are; this section of the song was described as dunking "2009 Top 40 in liquid nitrogen" by Sundaresan. As it goes on, the song diffuses into a chaotic track built around experimental orchestral progressions. Lyrically, the second half of the track sees the narrator attack somebody with broken glass and then casually watch television as the victim bleeds outside. "Kodak Moment" is a six-minute epic that begins as an emo-electronic song about mourning a breakup. During the final moments of the song's first section, a Robinson-inspired piano line is overpowered by crashes of synthesizers reminiscent of 100 gecs. The centerpiece of the song contains a dariacore "mini-malfunction", as described by Sundaresan. The song concludes with piano notes, electronic ambiance, and bells playing a nursery-style melody. Press-Reynolds described the song as being especially apparent of the album's video game influence, comparing the song's outro to the "Emotion" theme from Black and White. In "Can You Tell?", Remover's voice comes out of loud, messy sounds, gets clear for a moment, and then goes back into the noise. "How to Lie" is another one of the album's stripped-back moments. "Champ" features electronics that Sundaresan described as feeling "small and cold", which accompany Remover singing about lying in snow in the song's lyrics. The penultimate track of the standard edition, "Eyes Off the Wheel, I'm a Star", features a double-time emo breakdown. The album's final track, "Let's Go Home", showcases Remover's voice ranging from a tenor to a worn alto. The vinyl version of Frailty includes a live version of "Can You Tell?" and the song "Might Be Crazy".

== Artwork ==
The artwork of Frailty is a grainy and JPEG-compressed photograph of a house with two people sitting and a parked car in front. It is a screenshot of a house in Wakita, Oklahoma that Remover took from Google Street View while making the album. About the artwork, Remover stated that they enjoyed how the people in the photograph are facing toward the camera and how the house looks. They described it as "ominous, but also familiar" and likened it to what they see when they go on walks in their neighborhood. The house's address was originally lost, as Remover saved the image under a mismatched address, rendering the house unlocatable. This further encouraged them to select this house as the image, calling it "creepy."

Before choosing the current artwork, Remover searched across the United States on Google Maps to find "cool stuff" to screenshot, including highways. Originally, the album's artwork was a screenshot of a house located in North Dakota with a bus in the front yard, but was scrapped due to the screenshot being low quality.

== Promotion and release ==
The lead single for Frailty, "How to Lie", was released on June 23, 2021. It was followed by "Pretender" on August 9. Remover announced the album on September 26, revealing its cover artwork, release date, and track list. "Search Party" was released as the album's third single on October 13. Frailty was released by DeadAir Records on November 12, through streaming, cassette and CD formats. The album was originally released under Remover's former name Dltzk, prior to coming out as a trans woman in 2022. It was officially reissued under the Jane Remover name on November 16, 2022. The album was later issued on vinyl on May 4, 2023.

=== Frailty (Deluxe) rerelease ===
Frailty's deluxe version was teased on Remover's social media, where they shared a video of "fuzzy images and platitudes about growing up." Less than two months following the release of "Beauty Sleep" on 23 September 2026, and for Frailty's fifth anniversary, Remover rereleased a deluxe version of the album via DeadAir. The rerelease officially issued "Might Be Crazy," which previously was available only on Frailty's vinyl release. Four other songs were added, interspersed throughout the original track listing, "It's a Vicious Cycle," "Kill Your Composure," "Kodak Moment Reprise," and "My Summer in Encino". The rerelease also featured a new album cover which riffed on Frailty's original cover art, depicting Remover standing on the porch of the identical Oklahoma-based rural home at twilight. Along with this, "Misplace" was released as the album's fourth single alongside a re-recorded version on November 13.

== Critical reception ==
Professional ratings
Review scores
Source	Rating
The Needle Drop	7/10 (Note: Specifically, Fantano rated the album a "light to decent 7".)
Paste	8.3/10
Pitchfork	8.0/10

=== Contemporary ===
Frailty received critical acclaim and expanded the size of Remover's audience. In a positive review from Pitchfork, Sundaresan felt the album's numerous genres "blend into and inform each other in adventurous ways", citing "Search Party" as a defining example. He further wrote that nearly all songs have danceable moments and enjoyed hearing Remover find themselves in the music, but felt some of their forays into the album's genres can be "even downright bad at times". Grant Sharples of Paste also praised the blend of influences and styles; he wrote that "Frailty is a testament to the power of genre and how everything we consume inevitably infiltrates our psyche". He enjoyed the hooks presented on Frailty and felt that Remover controlled their many influences using a unique artistic vision. Fantano referred to the album as "consistently creative and impressive", but criticized Remover's singing. Kelly Liu of Pitchfork deemed "Search Party" a standout track; similarly, Jordan Darville for The Fader considered it one of the best tracks of its release week and called it a "soaring rock epic".

=== Retrospective ===
In June 2022, Darville wrote that he considered Frailty an improvement in songwriting and production compared to Teen Week; he said the songs are "shrouded in lo-fi tape effects, shredded to pop-punk perfection". In February 2023, Brady Brickner-Wood from The Fader wrote that "Frailty immediately stood out as the most elegant and panoramic album" from the hyperpop and digicore scenes. He referred to it as "compositionally sophisticated and emotionally nuanced" and felt its textures and moods were dynamic. In February 2024, David Feigelson of Paste hailed Frailty as a "monster debut" and named it one of his favorite albums of the decade, calling it a "perfect distillation of teenage angst".

=== Rankings ===
Frailty was ranked at 47 on Pitchfork's list of the best albums of 2021 and was included in their list of 2021's best progressive pop music, with Zhang writing that Frailty is "more melodically minded and refined than [their] previous work". Fantano ranked it at number 50 in his list of the best albums of the year. It also placed on Paste's list of the year's 30 best debut albums; Sharples praised Frailty for being "coherent yet ambitious, focused yet towering". The Fader placed "Search Party" at number 53 on their list of the best songs of 2021. In October 2024, Frailty further landed in Paste's mid-decade rankings of the best debut albums and the best overall albums of the 2020s. The staff at Pitchfork considered Frailty the 33rd best album of the 2020s in their mid-decade list; Ian Cohen wrote that the "teenage mind of 1921 wouldn't be able to comprehend the sound of Frailty, but they'd totally get it all the same".

== Aftermath ==
After the release of Frailty, Remover has since considered the album a work of a different person than themselves, due to their gender transition. They also stated that they "had a huge awakening" after its release and grew to dislike the album. They thought to themselves, "This is childish, too corny. I should be making adult music," which led to a more serious artistic approach on their following album, Census Designated (2023). The album was made with the intent of having a different sound than Frailty.

== Track listing ==
All tracks are written and produced by Jane Remover.

Standard edition
No.	Title	Length
1.	"Goldfish"	3:01
2.	"Your Clothes"	4:14
3.	"Misplace"	3:53
4.	"Pretender"	3:41
5.	"Search Party"	4:58
6.	"Buzzcut, Daisy"	2:30
7.	"Movies for Guys"	5:45
8.	"Kodak Moment"	6:07
9.	"Can You Tell?"	3:28
10.	"How to Lie"	3:45
11.	"Champ"	6:16
12.	"Eyes Off the Wheel, I'm a Star"	3:53
13.	"Let's Go Home"	5:32
Total length:		57:03

Vinyl release
No.	Title	Length
14.	"Can You Tell?" (live version)	3:17
15.	"Might Be Crazy"	3:22
Total length:		63:49

Deluxe edition
No.	Title	Length
2.	"Might Be Crazy"	3:25
6.	"It's a Vicious Cycle"	2:58
12.	"Kill Your Composure"	4:59
17.	"Kodak Moment Reprise"	3:10
18.	"My Summer in Encino"	5:16
Total length:		77:01

=== Notes ===
- All tracks are stylised in lowercase.
- "Can You Tell?" was originally released as "Tells All, Loves It". However, this was changed shortly after release.

== Personnel ==
Credits adapted from the liner notes of Frailty.

- Jane Remover – songwriter, producer, all instruments, mixing
- Juno Norton – backing vocals ("Let's Go Home")
- Kale Itkonen – backing vocals ("Let's Go Home")
- Moa – vinyl mastering, remastering (Deluxe reissue only)
- Brandon Burton – cover photography (Deluxe reissue only)

== Release history ==
Region	Date	Format(s)	Label	Edition	Ref.
Worldwide	November 12, 2021	Digital download; streaming	DeadAir	Standard	
United States	November 12, 2021	Cassette; CD	DeadAir	Standard	
United States	May 4, 2023	LP	DeadAir	Standard	
United Kingdom	July 3, 2023	LP	DeadAir	Standard	
Hong Kong	July 10, 2023	LP	DeadAir	Standard	
Worldwide	November 12, 2026	Digital download; streaming	DeadAir	Deluxe	
United States	February 12, 2027	CD; LP	DeadAir	Deluxe	
