= North American College and Community Radio Chart =

Weekly top 200 radio chart

The North American College and Community Chart
- Website type: Record chart
- Available in: English
- Website: naccchart.com
- Launched: January 2017

The North American College and Community Radio Chart, often abbreviated as NACC, is a weekly Top 200 radio chart launched in January 2017. As of 2018, the NACC chart receives weekly airplay reports from over 200 radio stations across North America.

== History ==
The Top 200 chart was founded in January 2017, while smaller genre-specific charts were added to the website in August 2017. All charts on NACC are weighted charts, meaning that major market stations carry more weight than smaller market stations.

After the dissolution of CMJ in 2017, NACC has become the primary source for the publication of college radio airplay. As a result, the NACC Top 200 Chart was cited in several major news publications in 2018, such as Billboard and The Economist.

== Charts ==
In addition to the Top 200, the NACC also tracks genre-specific charts each week, including charts for electronic and hip hop. Within the genre-specific charts, NACC publishes the #10 charting songs for each genre, as well as the most-added songs within each genre. "College Radio Weekly," a weekly public Spotify playlist, features the 40 highest charting artists from the NACC Top 200.
