= Underscores discography =

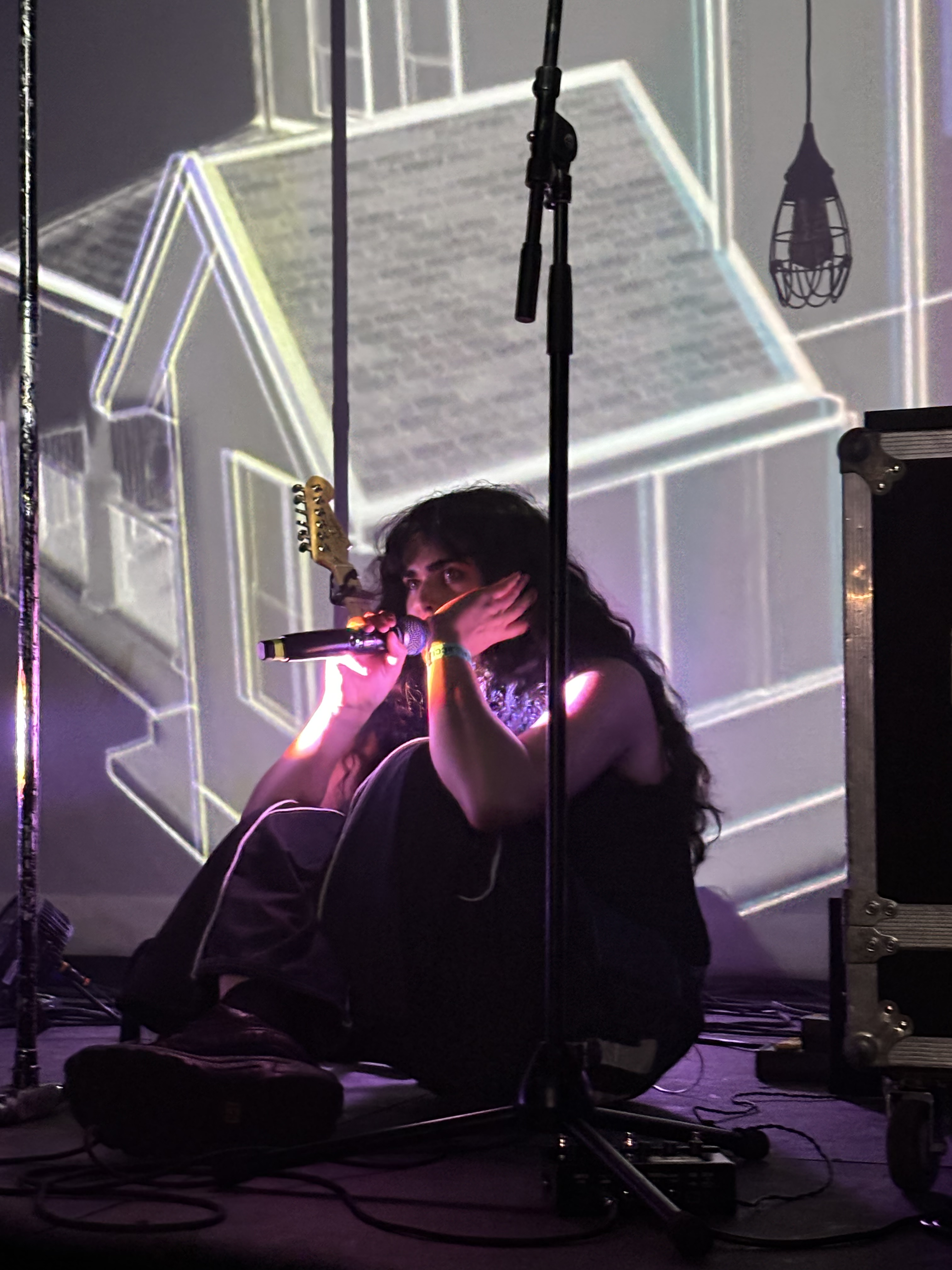
- Underscores performing in August 2024
- Studio albums: 3
- EPs: 8
- Compilation albums: 2
- Singles: 32
- Promotional singles: 4
- Music videos: 15
- Remixes: 6

The American musician Underscores has released three studio albums, eight extended plays, thirty-two singles, four promotional singles, fifteen music videos, and six remixes. (Note: Most remixes released under the Milkfish name are bootleg remixes. This list only includes official remixes.) Of her EPs, one was released under her pseudonym Milkfish and one was released under her alternate stage name, April Harper Grey. Most of her remixes are also released under the Milkfish alias.

== Studio albums ==
List of studio albums, with release date, label, release formats, selected chart positions and certifications shown
Title	Album details	Peak chart positions	
Title	Album details	US Top Album Sales	UK Album Downloads
Fishmonger	Released: March 25, 2021; Label: Self-released (initial release); DeadAir (2025 vinyl release); Formats: LP, CD, digital download, streaming	—N/a	—N/a
Wallsocket	Released: September 22, 2023 (standard), June 28, 2024 (deluxe); Label: Corporate Rockmusic, Mom + Pop; Formats: LP, CD, digital download, streaming	—N/a	—N/a
U	Released: March 20, 2026; Label: Corporate Rockmusic, Mom + Pop; Formats: LP, CD, digital download, streaming	41	43

== Compilations ==
List of compilations, with selected details
Title	Album details
Aqua Gel Exfoliator	Released: August 18, 2018; Formats: Digital download
Fresh Catch (B-Sides & Demos)	Released: August 7, 2021; Formats: Digital download

== Extended plays ==
=== As Underscores ===
List of EPs, with selected details
Title	EP details
Air Freshener	Released: August 26, 2016; Label: Good Enuff; Formats: Digital download, streaming
Skin Purifying Treatment	Released: June 27, 2018; Label: Self-released; Formats: Digital download, streaming
We Never Got Strawberry Cake	Released: February 16, 2019; Label: Self-released; Formats: Digital download, streaming
Character Development!	Released: January 15, 2020; Label: Bitbird; Formats: Digital download, streaming
Boneyard AKA Fearmonger	Released: December 3, 2021; Label: Self-released; Formats: LP, digital download, streaming
Covergirl: Originally by Sonny	Released: May 18, 2024; Label: Self-released; Formats: Digital download, streaming

=== As April Harper Grey ===
Title	EP details
Music from Ben's Sister	Released: May 29, 2026; Label: Self-released; Formats: Digital download, streaming

=== As Milkfish ===
List of EPs, with selected details
Title	EP details
GirlGirlBoy	Released: April 28, 2019; Label: Self-released; Formats: Digital download, streaming

== Singles ==
=== As Underscores ===
As lead artist

Title	Year	Album
"Climate" (with Who Came After)	2017	Free Spirits, Vol. 4
"About The Kid That Ran Away"	2017	Feel Trip, Vol. 3
"Twisted Lines" (with Just Another Crew)	2018	Non-album singles
"Sneakerhead"	2018	Non-album singles
"Spit" (with Knapsack)	2018	Non-album singles
"Throwing Tantrums While the Car's Parked"	2018	Issue Eleven | Pavement
"Melodrama"	2018	Skin Purifying Treatment
"Feather"	2018	Non-album singles
"About the Kid That Never Left the House"	2018	Non-album singles
"Veg Out" (featuring Inho Song)	2018	Non-album singles
"Trustfall!"	2020	Non-album singles
"Second Hand Embarrassment"	2021	Fishmonger
"Kinko's Field Trip 2006"	2021	Fishmonger
"Gunk"	2021	Boneyard AKA Fearmonger
"Everybody's Dead!"	2021	Boneyard AKA Fearmonger
"Count of Three (You Can Eat $#@!)"	2023	Non-album single
"Cops and Robbers"	2023	Wallsocket
"You Don't Even Know Who I Am"	2023	Wallsocket
"Locals (Girls Like Us)" (with Gabby Start)	2023	Wallsocket
"Old Money Bitch"	2023	Wallsocket
"My Guy (Corporate Shuffle)"	2024	Wallsocket (Director's Cut)
"Poplife" (with Umru)	2025	Non-album single
"Music"	2025	U
"Do It"	2025	U
"Tell Me (U Want It)"	2026	U
"Unlimited Love" (Note: With the B-side "The Peace" (Frost Children Remix).)	2026	TBA

As featured artist

Title	Year	Album
"Prodigal" (with DJ Re:Code)	2023	ReVertPunk!
"Harvest Sky" (with Oklou)	2024	Choke Enough
"Spencer Needs a Ladder" (with That Kid and 6arelyhuman)	2025	TK Ultra (Remixes)
"Booboo2" (with Yaeji and Aliyah's Interlude)	2025	Non-album single
"Copycats" (with Danny Brown)	2025	Stardust
"Tabloid Talk" (with Aries)	2026	Non-album single
"Addicted2U" (with Bktherula)	2026	N5on

=== As Milkfish ===
Title	Year	Album
"Everybody Shut Up" (with Six Impala)	2025	Non-album single

== Promotional singles ==
=== As underscores ===
Title	Year	Album
"Lustbug"	2023	Covergirl: Originally by Sonny
"Headlock, Originally by Imogen Heap"	2024	Non-album single
"Point A"	2025	Non-album single
"What a Girl Gotta Do"	2025	Non-album single

=== As Olivia offseason (Note: Or Olivia Maldonado (Lunk)) ===
Title	Year	Album
"Roadhead / What A Girl Gotta Do"	2023	
"Tell Him"	2024	
"DTW"	2026	

== Guest appearances ==
Title	Year	Album
"Regretful" (with Whysp)	2018	Broken Up
"Off To Bed"	2018	All Nighter, Vol. 1
"No Parents!!!" (with Circuit Hour and Knapsack)	2018	All Nighter, Vol. 1
"Walls" (with Yoku)	2018	All Nighter, Vol. 1
"Teenage Cloud Anthem" (with Knapsack)	2018	Futura
"No Money!!!" (with Circuit Hour, Knapsack & Robin)	2019	All Nighter, Vol. 2
"No Regrets!!!" (with Circuit Hour, Knapsack, Robin & Nebita)	2019	All Nighter, Vol. 3
"Comfort Song" (with Yitaku)	2020	Petal Blizzard
"1-800-Fuckoff" (with Kimj and Umru)	2025	Korean American
"Baby" (with Danny Brown)	2025	Stardust
"Girls like us" (with DJ Sona & League of Legends)	2026	DJ Sona (Mythic Mix)
"100% Td" (with DJ Sona & League of Legends)	2026	DJ Sona (Mythic Mix)
"Live Ur life" (with DJ Sona & League of Legends)	2026	DJ Sona (Mythic Mix)

== Remixes ==
=== As Underscores ===
Song	Year	Artist
"Shatter"	2019	Baynk (Note: Underscores is also credited as a featured artist.) (featuring Martin Luke Brown)
"Cdbaby<3"	2022	Chloe Moriondo (Note: Underscores was credited as a featured artist when the remix was included on the "Cdbaby<3 (Banoffee remix)" single.)
"It's You"	2026	Ninajirachi (featuring Daine)
"Perfect Pinterest Garden" (remixed with Ninajirachi)	2026	Porter Robinson

=== As Milkfish ===
Song	Year	Artist
"Records"	2024	Umru (featuring Chase Icon)
"Harvest Sky"	2024	Oklou (with Underscores)
"7'Mix" (remixed with Umru)	2026	EQ (featuring Estratosfera & Qiri)

== Music videos ==
Song	Year	Director
As lead artist
"Mild Season"	2015	Underscores
"Pay Attention!"	2020	Underscores, Garrison Ho
"Second Hand Embarrassment"	2021	Underscores, Ayodeji
"Spoiled Little Brat"	2021	Ayodeji
"Gunk"	2021	Andrew Stern
"Everybody's Dead!"	2022	Andrew Stern
"Heck"	2022	Lewis Tarver
"Cops and Robbers"	2023	Ayodeji
"You Don't Even Know Who I Am"	2023	Ayodeji
"Locals (Girls Like Us)"	2023	Ayodeji
"Old Money Bitch"	2023	Ayodeji
"My Guy (Corporate Shuffle)"	2024	Ayodeji
"Stupid (Can't Run from the Urge)"	2024	Hideto Hotta
"Poplife"	2025	Umru, Underscores
"Music"	2025	Underscores
"Do It"	2025	Underscores
"Do It (Yves Remix)"	2026	Underscores, Gubo
"Tell Me (U Want It)"	2026	Underscores
"Innuendo (I Get U)"	2026	Underscores
"Lovefield"	2026	Underscores
"The Peace"	2026	Ayodeji
Cameo appearances
"Dancing with Your Eyes Closed" (Jane Remover)	2025	Jane Remover, Noah Sellers

=== Songs Used in Media ===
Several of underscores' songs have been used within TV shows, video games and commercials including the following:

Year	Song	Media
2026	"Do It"	Grand Theft Auto VI
2023	"Your favorite sidekick"	Goosebumps (S1E1) (Disney+ & Hulu)
