= Love Field =

Love Field may refer to:

== Places ==
- Dallas Love Field, an airport in Texas, United States
  - Love Field, Dallas, a neighborhood in Dallas, Texas near the airport
- Ernest A. Love Field, an airport in Arizona, United States

== Media ==
- Love Field (film), a 1992 American film
- "Love Field", a song by Elvis Costello on the 1984 album Goodbye Cruel World
- Love Field, a play by Stephen Davis, later adapted as the 1992 film Ruby
- "Lovefield", a song by Underscores on the 2026 album U
