= U (Underscores album) =

Studio album by Underscores
- Released: March 20, 2026
- Recorded: 2025
- Genres: Pop; hyperpop; dance-pop
- Length: 34:06
- Labels: Mom + Pop; Corporate Rockmusic
- Producer: Underscores

Underscores chronology
| Covergirl: Originally by Sonny (2024) | U (2026) |

Singles from U
- 1. "Music" Released: June 27, 2025; 2. "Do It" Released: November 4, 2025; 3. "Tell Me (U Want It)" Released: February 25, 2026

U is the third studio album by the American musician Underscores. It was released by Mom + Pop Music on March 20, 2026. Marked as a departure from the rural-inspired rock concept album Wallsocket (2023), U establishes a more pop-based direction in genres ranging from dubstep to future bass. Underscores describes the album as being suited for malls, airports, hotels, and supermarkets, based on her experiences as a touring musician in constant transit.

Following Underscores' Wallsocket tour, she took a break from her main music by writing accessible pop songs for other artists, inspiring her third studio album. Unlike her previous studio albums, U was written and recorded in multiple cities around the world while touring with Porter Robinson in the spring and Danny Brown in the winter, using a portable recording setup. Underscores noted that she made the album as an attempt to connect to what inspired her in her childhood, drawing inspiration from "consumerist architecture" like hotels and malls.

Sonically, U is a pop, hyperpop, and dance-pop album using autotuned vocals and dubstep production, with influences from musicians including Timbaland, Justin Timberlake, Grimes, Cascada, and Beck. Thematically, it fixates on themes of love, sex, and fame. The album also contains a more minimalistic approach compared to Underscores' usual maximalist production, taking inspiration from musicians Oklou and Mk.gee. The album artwork was drawn by Japanese illustrator Ochiai Shohei, which resembles the San Francisco shopping mall Stonestown Galleria.

U received critical acclaim from music critics, praising the album's production, writing, and experimental approach to pop music. To promote the album, Underscores released three singles: "Music", "Do It", and "Tell Me (U Want It)", and embarked on a headlining North American tour in support of the album from May to June 2026. Commercially, it charted on the UK Album Downloads and North American College and Community Radio (NACC) charts.

== Background ==
On September 22, 2023, Underscores released her second studio album Wallsocket to critical acclaim from publications including DIY, Dork, The Line of Best Fit, and The Needle Drop. Blending pop with rock and folk, it is based on the fictional setting of Wallsocket, inspired by her grandparents' Idaho home, the upper middle class in slasher films, rural American horror films, country and blues elements, and 2010s pop music.

In support of the album, Underscores went on a European tour from November to December 2023 and toured in Japan and Australia from May to June 2024. She later performed at the Governors Ball Music Festival in June, Outside Lands Festival in August, and Palomosa Festival in September. Throughout 2024 and 2025, Underscores remained active through occasional collaborations, such as "Harvest Sky" with Oklou in October, "Poplife" with Umru in April 2025, "Booboo2" with Yaeji and Aliyah's Interlude in September, and "Copycats" with Danny Brown in October.

== Production ==
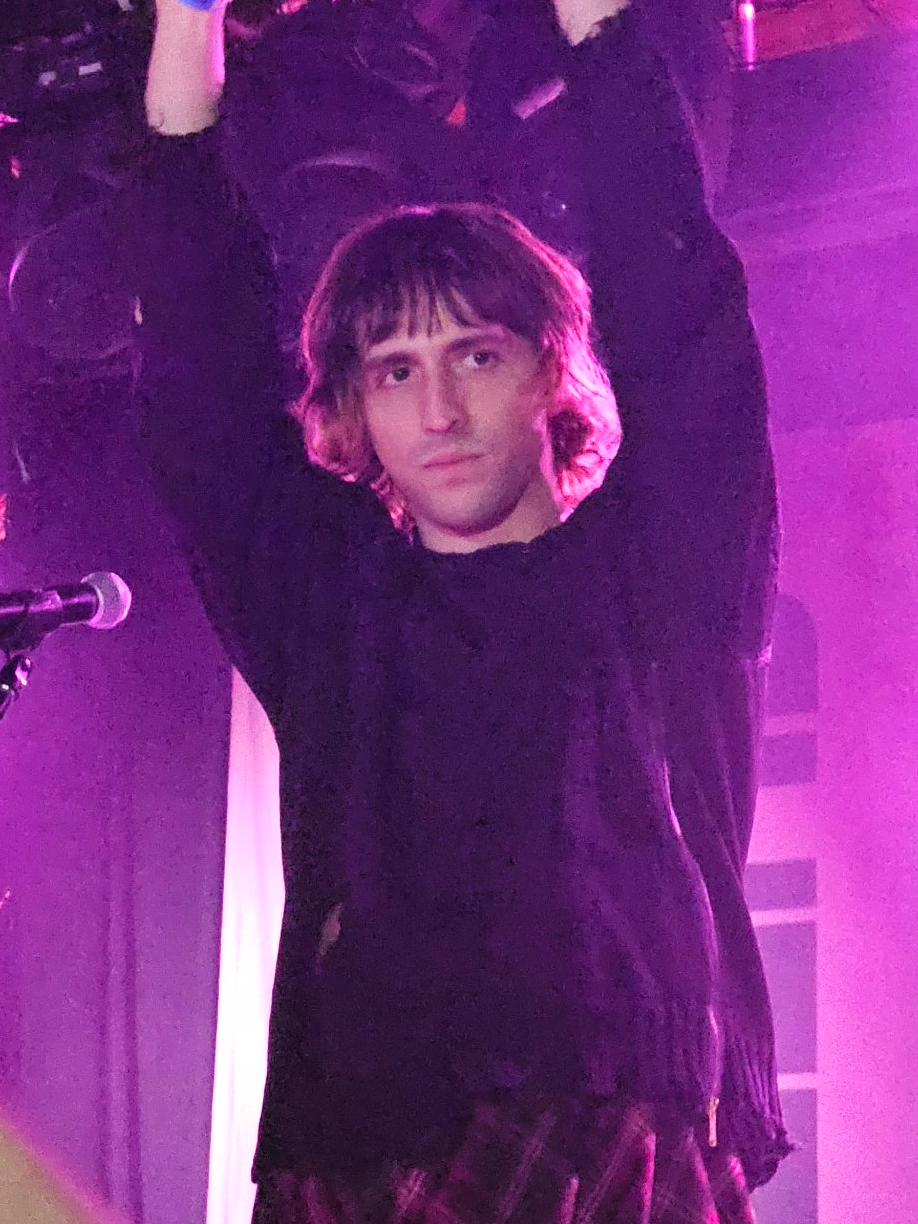
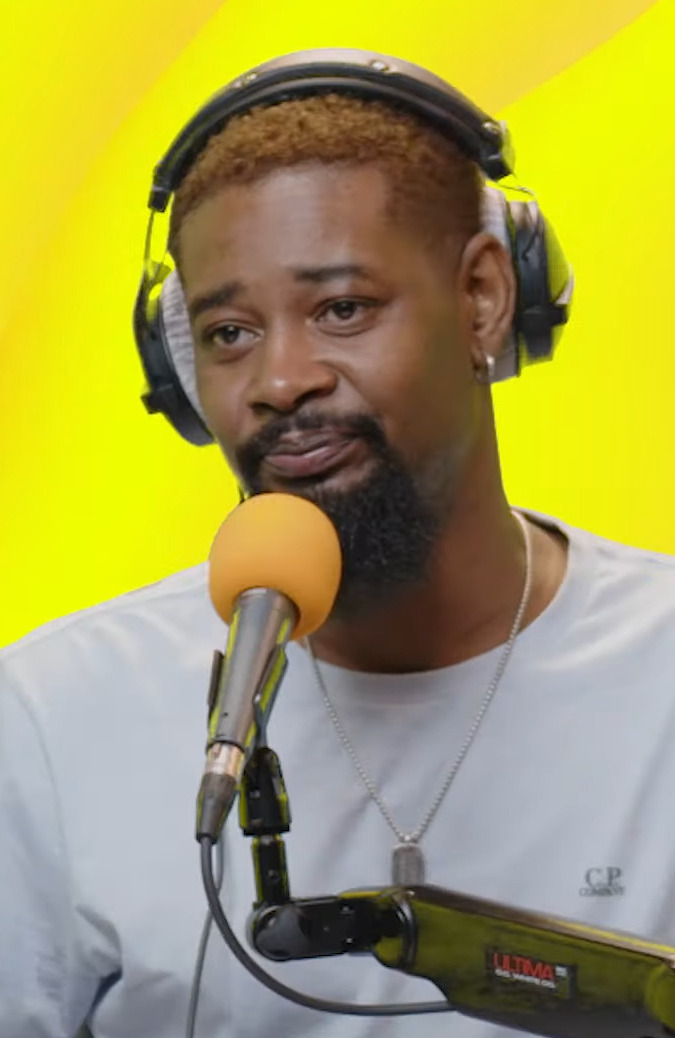
Underscores produced and recorded U while touring with Porter Robinson (left) in the spring and Danny Brown in the winter of 2025.

Following her tour, Underscores took a break from her own music by writing "accessible pop songs" for other artists. Although these songs were never released, they inspired her to venture into pop music. Compared to Underscores' previous albums, U was recorded in various cities around the world while touring with DJ and producer Porter Robinson in the spring and during her time as a supporting act for Danny Brown's Stardust tour. Traveling between cities shaped her approach to writing and recording with a much simpler and convenient recording setup compared to Wallsocket, with a Focusrite Scarlett interface and a SM7B microphone. By that time, her direction found on U emerged when she released a cover of "Headlock" by Imogen Heap on her SoundCloud in November 2024.

In March 2026, during an interview with NME, Underscores revealed that the album was an attempt to connect to what inspired her as a six-year-old, wanting to make a project suited for "fluorescent, consumerist architecture". When she was six, she was obsessed with hotels so much that her grandmother convinced the Hotel Gansevoort to let her take a peek inside a room. Underscores, grinning, remarked it was "one of the best days of her life". Burned out from conceptualizing Wallsocket, Underscores began writing her third studio album. At the time, she wanted to self-title her third album, but hesitated to do so, later becoming "obsessed with the idea of calling it U instead. Underscores also said that her relationship with making music evolved after it became her career, which "does sometimes suck the fun out of it a little". As a result, she attempts a restoration of her interest in music on each album, crediting collaborations at the time for her continued inspiration. She drafted lyrics for U outside high-end storefronts and recorded voice memos on escalators.

According to the CD's liner notes, all tracks were mainly written and recorded in Chicago. "Tell Me (U Want It)" was recorded in Chicago, Tokyo, Los Angeles, San Francisco, Boston, Minneapolis, on Queen Elizabeth Way, the I-90, and the I-94. "Music" was recorded in Chicago, Oslo, Copenhagen, Amsterdam, Cologne, and Glasgow. "Hollywood Forever" was recorded in Chicago, Paris, Barcelona, New York City, and mid-air. "The Peace" was recorded in Chicago, New York City, Munich, on the N-71, and in mid-air. "Innuendo (I Get U)" was recorded in Chicago and Minneapolis. "Lovefield" was solely recorded in Chicago. "Do It" and "Bodyfeeling" were recorded in Chicago, New York City, Los Angeles, and Tokyo. "Wish U Well" was recorded in Chicago, San Francisco, Los Angeles, and Minneapolis. All tracks were written, recorded, produced, mixed, and mastered by Underscores, except "Music", which was mastered by Heba Kadry.

== Composition ==
=== Overview ===
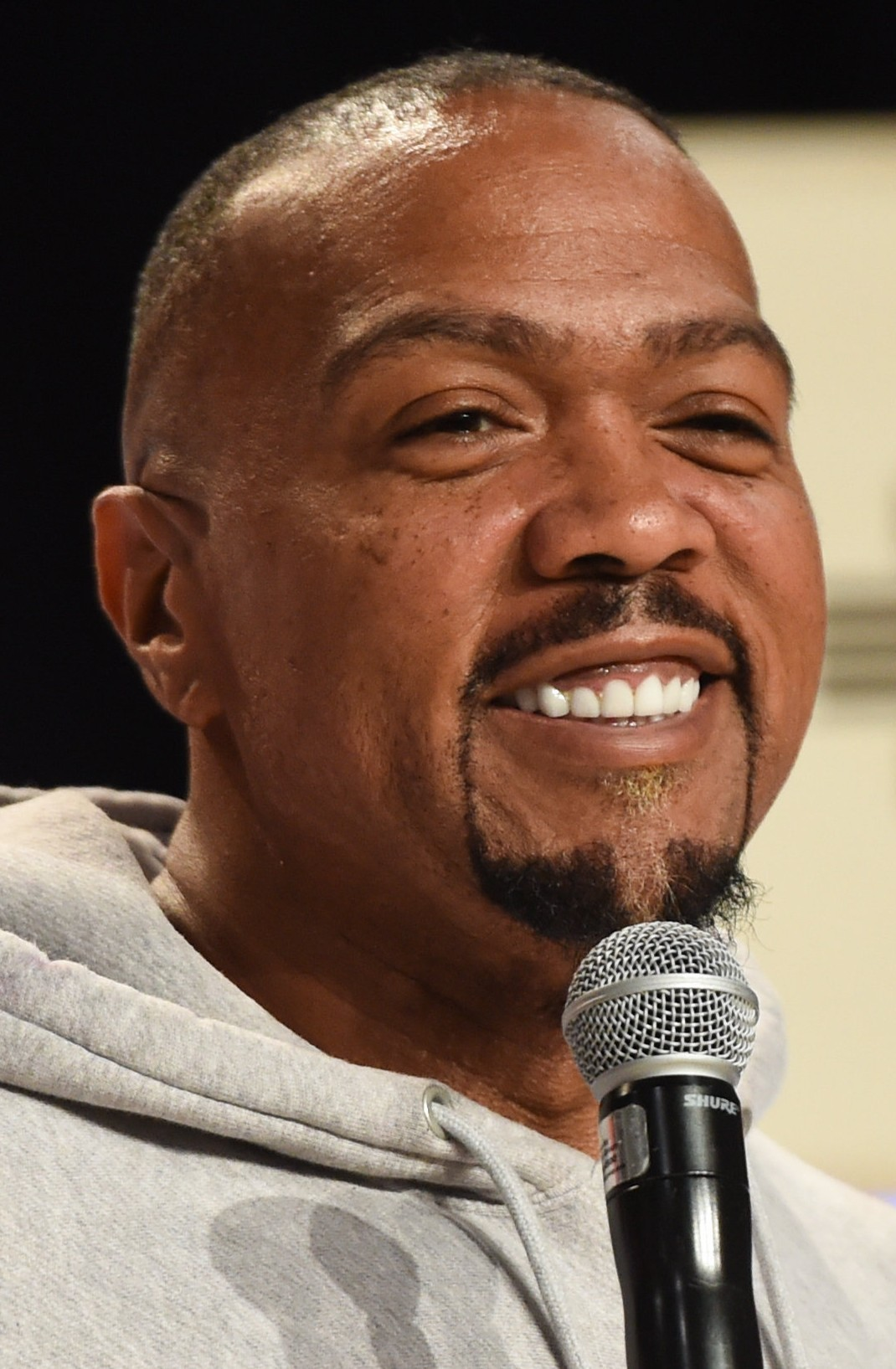
U explores influences from record producer Timbaland (pictured in 2019).

U is a pop, hyperpop, and dance-pop album with influences of dubstep and EDM. The album consists of nine tracks across a thirty-four minute runtime and contains no features. Underscores personally described the album as "music for [her] iPhone spy movie" and being suited for malls, airports, hotels, and supermarkets as a touring musician in constant transit. The album fixates on heartfelt themes of love, sex, and fame, expressed through accessible pop songs, highlighting Underscores as a "digital-age pop star," but one whose newfound celebrity strains her search for connection. Despite the "accessible pop" approach, she would not consider it "a club record", emphasizing that it was produced to be listened to solely on headphones.

Sonically, the album utilizes autotuned vocals, dubstep production, and beats crossing between "speedy pop-house" and "chattering acid lines". Shifting through "luscious Neptunes-adjacent gloss", U is sonically reminiscent of a tech-centric audio painting. The album mixes a "Justin-Timberlake-and-Timbaland-esque swagger" with mid-2010s dubstep influences, and also contains influences from musicians Grimes, Cascada, and Beck. Despite its glossy nature, the album does not erase the post-genre and chaotic tone from her previous work, emphasizing maximalism in a "slimmed-down package". In terms of quieter songs, Underscores stated she made them to expand her versatility in music, having been used to making maximalist music. To avoid overproduction, she took inspiration from musicians Oklou and Mk.gee and their use of instruments as a "sound bed" by creating patches and sounds to experiment with on her MIDI keyboard.

According to Alexis Petridis of The Guardian, the album sounds "less hair-raising" compared to her earlier work, leaving behind her emo and punk influences and replacing them with R&B from the late 1990s to the early 2000s, containing the experimental influences of producers Timbaland, the Neptunes, and Rodney Jerkins. Unlike Wallsocket, which had a complex narrative and diversified sonically, U's lyrics are reduced through themes of love as a concise drama. Venturing away from the philosophical nature of her previous album, U flips her questioning in an anxious world through pleasure and escape. Despite their differences, both still share Underscores' observational viewpoint.

=== Tracks 1-5 ===
The opening track, "Tell Me (U Want It)", introduces itself with the line, "Hey! It's U!", in a fragmented voice before the track continues into an overstimulating sonic universe akin to the energy of Duran Duran's "Hungry Like the Wolf" (1982). Throughout, the track manages glitchy autotuned vocal effects, EDM synths, a sound effect of a DJ backspinning a record, silence highlighted with laughter, and booming drums while repeating the title of the track in a time signature of 12/8 before concluding with a "stuttering, pixelated coda". The track also contains a reference to her track "Spoiled Little Brat" from Fishmonger (2021).

Transitioning onto the EDM-based second track, "Music", through maximalist pop and a drill-influenced beat, evolves into a delicate drop into the chorus, before a synth-filled bridge and wobbling dubstep that concludes to a breakdown. Turning the "wet dream of a perfect tune" into a metaphor about a relationship, Underscores uses music-themed imagery as a metaphor for being in love through pleasure and harmony, while serving as a homage to Madonna's track of the same name. The third track, "Hollywood Forever", akin to 100 gecs' "Hollywood Baby" (2023), shows a laid-back tone while continuing the danceability of the album, reminiscent of a well-produced mid-2010s song featuring synths. As the track progresses, it evolves from bubblegum bass to Jersey club within five minutes.

The fourth track, "The Peace", strips itself to harmonized vocals, and depicts a romantic connection through shared cigarettes while exploring its ups-and-downs as a ballad track reminiscent of Jason Derulo's "Whatcha Say" (2009), which heavily samples Imogen Heap’s "Hide and Seek" (2005), itself a sparse a cappella track built around layered, harmonized vocals. Underscores recalled she wanted the track to "sound like the Mac startup sound was singing 'Eleanor Rigby'". The fifth track, "Innuendo (I Get U)", compresses irony into a double helix through gun-cock samples and twitching synth bass. Lyrically, Underscores sings about wanting to keep a romantic relationship more casual when attracted to someone, while serving innuendos akin to the song's title and including a dance break reminiscent of those in Blackpink songs.

=== Tracks 6-9 ===
The sixth track, "Lovefield", maintains a hypnotic loop with an anthemic chorus through A. G. Cook-coded synths and a trance influence. The track manages both romantic fantasy and sincerity before concluding with a bittersweet dance-pop outro. Lyrically, she mourns unrewarded love with hazy, unfiltered vocals. The seventh track, "Do It", brings off an "early-solo Justin Timberlake vibe" through electropop, K-pop, and dance-pop styles. Vibrated with chopped-up acoustic guitars, the song is lyrically about negotiating a contract for a romantic relationship, while showcasing a four-on-the-floor beat, percussive guitars, and Britpop-inspired synths throughout the song. Lyrically, Underscores questions a potential suitor, as sexual kinks and materialism turn out pointless. Drifting into dream-like R&B, she proclaims she's "married to the music".

The eighth track, "Bodyfeeling", uses a four-on-the-floor rhythm in a conventional manner unlike the previous tracks, giving vocal hiccups similar to Michael Jackson and guitar tones reminiscent of Mk.gee's work in a "pure pop" track. The track gets saturated as it progresses. The final track, "Wish U Well", concludes the album on a solid note in comparison to Charli XCX's "Track 10" (2017) as a lyrical goodbye to a past romantic relationship before moving on. Sonically, the track explores a bro-country influence and mixes falsetto and chest vocals throughout the track.

== Artwork ==
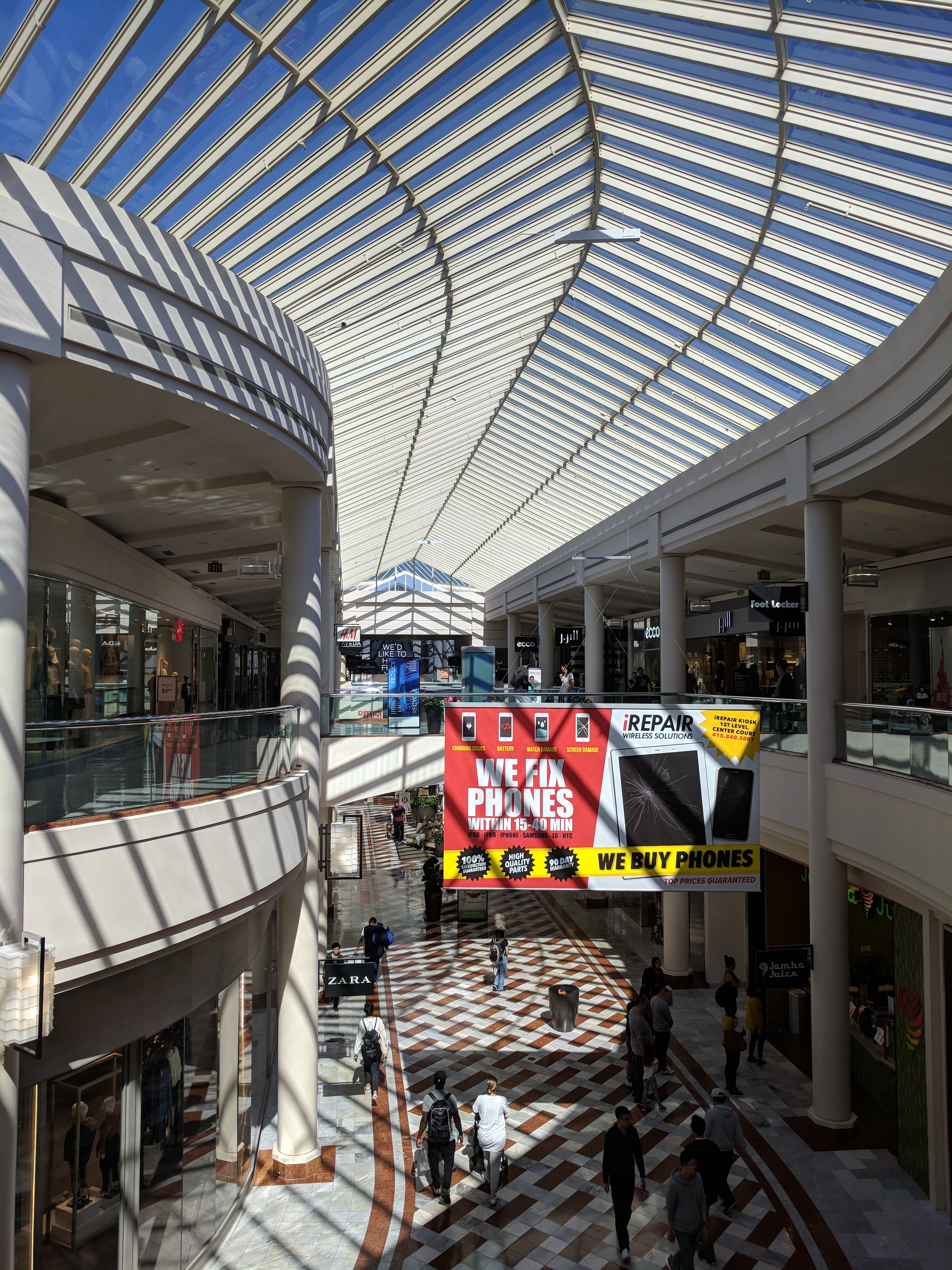
An inside view of the Stonestown Galleria mall, used as the main subject of U's album artwork.

The album artwork for U was designed by Japanese illustrator Ochiai Shohei and resembles Stonestown Galleria, a shopping mall in San Francisco. While working on Wallsocket, Underscores discovered and felt captivated by Shohei's artwork, especially his illustration of an Apple MacBook displaying GarageBand alongside a cord-attached microphone and a MacBook charger. When asked about Shohei's artwork, Underscores said that it reminded her of technology and architecture she fondly loved since she was a child, with the "waviness of the lines" and vibrant colors giving a sense of "childlike wonder". At the same time, Shohei was known for working with Pharrell Williams' Joopiter and brands including New Era and Tamagotchi. Artistically, Shohei used "household goods and childhood toys through a nostalgic lens" in his artwork.

Shohei first discovered and took interest in Underscores when Japanese band Yonawo member Kei recommended her music to him. Following his discovery, he instinctively knew he wanted to work with Underscores. When they first connected, Underscores recommended Shohei to make designs for Wallsocket, but did not match artistically, as Underscores considered it to feel more like a "painting album", while the feel of U resembles Shohei's art style visually. To capture her vision of the album, Underscores reached out to Shohei again. When the latter received the request from the former's manager, he declined it due to a conflicting schedule, as well as having never made album artwork before. As Shohei still wanted to work with Underscores, he responded back to her Instagram messages to apologize for declining. As both began occasionally communicating, it led to Shohei creating the single artwork for U's first single, "Music".

Following "Music", Shohei created two more single covers for "Do It" and "Tell Me (U Want It)". He revealed that Underscores would propose a concept, then be given creative control for designing the artwork. Discussing the mall setting in the album cover for U, they had a more granular process, as they conceptualized fictional shops and refined specific elements, including the "color of the pillars, the shape of its headphone logo", and the shading of the floor and the sky. Shohei also incorporated elements that were inspired by the album's track titles and other additions, including his favorite toy store and DVD shop. Through the process, they made multiple revisions until it was completed.

Shohei credited Underscores as the designer, while he considered himself the on-site director. The album artwork is also influenced by Shohei's other artwork, with one depicting shopping mall Lumine Est in Shinjuku, and the other depicting a Denny's in Shibuya. Underscores later reflected on the idea of U's album cover through its themes of "city life, homesickness, and luxury". She called it "her San Francisco album", and commonly went to the Stonestown Galleria in high school while listening to music.

== Promotion and release ==
On June 25, Underscores teased the music video to the album's lead single "Music" on X, announcing that the song would release that Friday. Two days later, on the night of its release, she performed the song at Pitchfork & Them Present: Night Out, hosted at Knockdown Center. On November 4, Underscores released the album's second single "Do It" alongside its music video, and performed at the Pitchfork Music Festival in London on November 8. Throughout November and December, she and electronic music duo Femtanyl were the opening acts to the North American leg of Danny Brown's Stardust tour. On January 23, 2026, Underscores released the remix to "Do It", featuring vocals from South Korean singer Yves, who added production alongside Ioah. One month later, on February 25, she released the album's third single "Tell Me (U Want It)" alongside its music video. A music video for "The Peace", directed by Ayodeji, was released on August 12.

On February 27, 2026, Underscores announced her third studio album U, along with its track list and release date of March 20. She further revealed the album showcasing a variety of genres from dubstep to future bass, and is inspired by transience and liminal spaces as the album's songs were written around the world, including hotel rooms, studios, airplanes, and vehicles. Describing the album, she wrote: "Music for malls, airports, hotels, supermarkets. I wrote these songs for U". For physical sales, a website titled U4ya.shop was established, releasing pre-orders for clear and picture-disc vinyl, CD, a "Music / Do It" 7-inch single, and a bundle combining a vinyl with a T-shirt.

On March 2, 2026, Underscores announced a nineteen-concert North American tour to support the album with Umru as the opening act, which began on May 27, in Los Angeles and concluded on June 26, in San Francisco. Upon its release commercially, U peaked at number 43 on UK Album Downloads and at number 63 on the North American College and Community Radio (NACC) charts. The night before the album's release, Underscores livestreamed herself walking and dancing around the Stonestown Galleria as the album played in full. A few weeks after the album's release, she hosted a seven-hour livestream on YouTube explaining the album's production. She hinted at a follow-up project to U, titled After-U, in the single "Unlimited Love", released August 2026. In November 2026, "Music" was nominated for Best Dance/Electronic Recording at the 69th Annual Grammy Awards and became her first nomination.

== Critical reception ==
Professional ratings
Aggregate scores
| Source | Rating |
|---|---|
| AnyDecentMusic? | 8.5/10 |
| Metacritic | 89/100 |
Review scores
| Source | Rating |
| Clash | 9/10 |
| Dork | 5/5 stars |
| The Guardian | 4/5 stars |
| The Line of Best Fit | 8/10 |
| The Needle Drop | 8/10 (Note: Specifically, Fantano rated the album a "strong 7 to a light 8".) |
| NME | 5/5 stars |
| Our Culture | 4/5 stars |
| Paste | B+ |
| Pitchfork | 8.6/10 |
| Sputnikmusic | 4.3/5 |

According to the review aggregator Metacritic, U received "universal acclaim" based on a weighted average score of 89 out of 100 from nine critic scores. The review aggregator Any Decent Music gave the album a weighted average score of 8.5 out of 10 from ten critic scores.

Otis Robinson of NME praised the album for its genre mixing and reflecting Underscores' approach to pop music through overstimulating production and "parasocial obsessions". Dan Harrison of Dork described U in multiple characteristics such as "vivid, funny, bruised, horny, annoyed euphoric, lonely and weird tender" as compliments to its writing. Alexis Petridis of The Guardian complimented the album for its higher production and writing value unlike most pop artists, although he felt that the lyrics were toned down in comparison to her previous work.

Robin Murray of Clash praised U for its joyful production and Underscores for bending the tropes of pop music to her own artistry, serving as an "emphatic statement of creativity from a singular force". Finn Cliff Hodges of The Quietus wrote that the album offers a tribute to people who lived the iTunes era of pop music from the 2000s and 2010s with a burst of nostalgia. Andy Steiner of Paste labeled U as "lovingly, beautifully plastic" in a way that comes from transformation, including at its most personal. Walden Green of Pitchfork complimented the album's production throughout, notifying that each detail on U requires close scrutiny. Anthony Fantano of The Needle Drop rated the album a "strong 7 to a light 8", giving insight into Underscores' writing as a breakup album with much of its emotions in a "state of torture and disorientation".

Juan P. Almanza of The Hoya called U a "must-listen album that deserves — no, demands — your attention", praising the romantic energy of the album alongside its concise structure. Hot Chocolate of Sputnikmusic emphasized the album's catchiness and technical excellence, stating that it gives an infused energy with "pastel charm that unravels itself with each listen". Sean Aitken of The Daily Campus considered U a well-produced album and an excellent addition to hyperpop and Underscores' discography. Matthew Kin of The Line of Best Fit gave insight into the album's writing and production, crediting U as the "most robust work of her career".

== Track listing ==
All tracks are written by April Harper Grey, a.k.a. Underscores.

| No. | Title | Length |
|---|---|---|
| 1. | "Tell Me (U Want It)" | 3:33 |
| 2. | "Music" | 3:27 |
| 3. | "Hollywood Forever" | 4:55 |
| 4. | "The Peace" | 2:49 |
| 5. | "Innuendo (I Get U)" | 3:28 |
| 6. | "Lovefield" | 3:52 |
| 7. | "Do It" | 3:33 |
| 8. | "Bodyfeeling" | 4:08 |
| 9. | "Wish U Well" | 4:21 |
| Total length: | | 34:06 |

== Personnel ==
Credits were adapted from Apple Music, Tidal, and the album's liner notes.

- April Harper Grey – vocals, production, mixing (all tracks); mastering (tracks 1, 3–9)
- Heba Kadry – mastering (2) (Note: The version of "Music" included on physical copies of the album is a remaster by Underscores.)
- Ochiai Shohei – artwork

== Charts ==
Chart performance for U
| Chart (2026) | Peak position |
|---|---|
| UK Album Downloads (Official Charts) | 43 |
| US Top Album Sales (Billboard) | 41 |
