= Carolesdaughter =

- Born: Thea Suzan Taylor
- Origin: Temecula, California, U.S.
- Genres: Alternative pop; pop-punk
- Years active: 2020–present
- Labels: Last Nite; Arista

Thea Suzan Taylor, known professionally as carolesdaughter, is an American musician, singer, songwriter and multi-instrumentalist. She rose to prominence in 2020 with the release of her single "Violent", which charted at number 10 on the Billboard Hot Alternative Songs chart and was certified Platinum by the Recording Industry Association of America (RIAA). She released her debut extended play, Please Put Me in a Medically Induced Coma, in 2022.

== Musical style and influences ==
Taylor's musical style has been described as alternative pop and pop-punk. Taylor cited a variety of artists, including Lil Peep, the Carpenters, the Ramones, Electric Light Orchestra, Black Flag, the Bee Gees, Tinashe, My Chemical Romance, the Story So Far, the Front Bottoms, and Johnny Hobo as influences.

== Discography ==
=== Extended plays ===
List of EPs, with selected details
Title	Album details
Please Put Me in a Medically Induced Coma	Released: April 8, 2022; Label: Last Nite, Arista; Format: CD, digital download, streaming

=== Singles ===
Title	Year	Peak chart positions	Certifications	Album(s)
Title	Year	US Hot Alt.	Certifications	Album(s)
"Wish I Wuz Dead"	2020	—		Non-album singles
"Porcelain Jesus"	2020	—		Non-album singles
"Brat"	2020	—		Non-album singles
"Violent"	2020	10	RIAA: Platinum	Non-album singles
"Trailer Trash"	2021	—		Please Put Me in a Medically Induced Coma
"Creep"	2021	—		Non-album single
"My Mother Wants Me Dead"	2021	—		Please Put Me in a Medically Induced Coma
"Target Practice"	2022	—		Please Put Me in a Medically Induced Coma
"Bozo Bozo Bozo" (Carolesdaughters Version)	2022	—		Fishmonger (DeadAir Legacy Edition)
"XO I Hope You Die"	2022	—		Non-album singles
"Sunshine and Roses"	2022	—		Non-album singles
"Nobody's Favorite Person, Not Even My Own"	2023	—		Non-album singles
"Good in Bed"	2023	—		Non-album singles
"Have Yourself a Merry Little Christmas"	2023	—		Non-album singles
"I Love My Man (He Just Doesn't Know It Yet)"	2024	—		Non-album singles
"Beautiful Girls (Get the Ugliest World)"	2024	—		Non-album singles
"King Baby"	2024	—		Non-album singles
"Virginia Slims"	2025	—		Non-album singles
"Baccarat Rouge"	2026	—		
"—" denotes a recording that did not chart or was not released in that territory
