= Everybody's Dead! =

Single by Underscores

from the EP Boneyard AKA Fearmonger
- Released: November 17, 2021
- Genre: Hyperpop; drum and bass
- Length: 1:52
- Songwriter: April Harper Grey
- Producer: Underscores

Underscores singles chronology
"Gunk" (2021)	"Everybody's Dead!" (2021)	"Count of Three (You Can Eat $#@!)" (2023)

Music video
- Everybody's Dead! on YouTube

"Everybody's Dead!" (stylized in sentence case) is a song by the American musician Underscores. It was released as the second single to her fifth extended play (EP), Boneyard AKA Fearmonger (2021), on November 17, 2021. A hyperpop song with elements of drum and bass, Underscores wrote the song about reoccurring feelings of anxiety she felt when waking up, and it includes voice samples of American producer Skrillex. A lyric video was released alongside the track, with a music video directed by Andrew Stern following on January 26, 2022. A remix by German producer Virtual Riot was released as a single on June 3, 2022.

== Background and release ==
After releasing her debut studio album Fishmonger earlier in 2021, Underscores found herself unable to create any new music as a result of newfound attention. This "dry spell" was broken when she created "Everybody's Dead!". Like most songs on Boneyard AKA Fearmonger, Underscores wrote the song with the goal of exploring the concept of fear. She said that it was an intentionally abrasive intro for the EP, stating in an interview with Genius that, "[w]hen people listen to this EP, I want their initial reaction to be, 'This is ridiculous.' But then, the more they listen to it, they should hear the nuance in it, the heaviness in it, and I hope they connect with it on some kind of emotional level."

"Everybody's Dead!" was released as the second single to Boneyard AKA Fearmonger on November 17, 2021. The initial release was supported by a lyric video. Like all tracks from the EP, the song was included on the DeadAir Legacy edition of Fishmonger, released on January 17, 2025.

== Composition ==
"Everybody's Dead!" is a hyperpop song with "heavy" elements of drum and bass. Discussing the song with Rolling Stone, Underscores said that the track was inspired by reoccurring feelings of anxiety she experienced when waking up in the morning: "Sometimes I wake up like, the world is ending, [...] Then I get coffee and go about my day and shit." It utilizes the "Pryda snare", a sound that was commonly used in big room house in the early 2010's. The intro and outro sample audio of American producer Skrillex talking, which was recorded prior to when he started making dubstep. Raphael Helfand of Fader felt that the song's tone "sets the scene" for the rest of Boneyard AKA Fearmonger. Retrospectively, Underscores called its lyrics "scattershot" and "word vomity [sic]", feeling that its music video was more effective in portraying the song's "feeling".

== Reception ==
"Everybody's Dead!" was included on the "best songs of 2021" list by the New York Times, specifically on writer Jon Caramanica's ranking.

== Music video ==
The music video for "Everybody's Dead!", directed by Andrew Stern, was released on January 26, 2022. The video opens with Underscores being run over by a car, unseen by its drivers, which triggers a series of moments of "existential dread". Its setup has been described as similar to that of "classic horror sequence[s]".

Speaking on the video, Stern said: "In our first conversation, [Underscores] mentioned that the song was about 'the feeling of existential dread when you first wake up and you can’t get out of bed.' I wanted to capture that sense of impending doom with intrusive images, just visceral moments of anatomy, repetition, and nature that represent those fears." Underscores has said that the music video more accurately portrays the song's themes than the song itself, stating that, "[t]here's something grotesque about a lot of the visuals that I really like and captured that impending doom feeling [...] Close ups of bodies that make me uncomfortable, because you zoom in so much that you're effectively dismembering it, taking it out of context." Helfand praised the music video, opining that "Cockroaches, big-guy wrestlers, and mirrored characters acting eerily different from one another make for an absurd and thrilling experience that ends up being more fun than scary."

== Release history ==
Release dates and formats for "Everybody's Dead!"
Region	Date	Format	Label	Ref.
Worldwide	November 17, 2021	Digital Download; Streaming	Self-released	
Worldwide	June 3, 2022	Digital Download; Streaming	Self-released	
