= Locals (Girls Like Us) =

- Standard cover

Single by Underscores featuring Gabby Start

from the album Wallsocket
- Released: July 12, 2023
- Recorded: 2022–2023
- Genre: Electroclash; hyperpop
- Length: 4:18
- Label: Mom + Pop; Corporate Rockmusic
- Songwriters: April Harper Grey; Gabriel O'Leary
- Producers: Underscores; Gabby Start

Underscores singles chronology
"You Don't Even Know Who I Am" (2023)	"Locals (Girls Like Us)" (2023)	"Old Money Bitch" (2023)

Music video
- "Locals (Girls Like Us)" on YouTube

"Locals (Girls Like Us)" (stylized in sentence case) is a song by American musician Underscores featuring American musician Gabby Start from the former's second studio album, Wallsocket (2023). It was released as the album's third single on July 12, 2023, through Mom + Pop. The album's artwork, title, and release date were announced alongside it. Underscores created the song to break away from the album's depressive nature, wanting to create a more fun track. She later sent its instrumental to Start, who quickly became interested in featuring on it.

"Locals (Girls Like Us)" features elements of electroclash and hyperpop, with critics often comparing its style to Kesha's early work. The song takes place directly after Wallsocket's preceding track, "Cops and Robbers", and follows a coming-of-age story revolving around three young girls, which resolves on the album's closing track, "Good Luck Final Girl". It received positive reviews from music critics, who often praised its composition and storytelling. The song was released alongside a music video, credited to both artists alongside Ayodeji and Chris Yellen.

== Background and release ==
Underscores began recording Wallsocket in January 2022. She later signed to Mom + Pop, wanting to take advantage of a record label budget to be more ambitious with the album. While recording, she found that its tone had become too depressing, citing that "everything was too sad. I wanted to have some fun." As a result, Underscores wanted to create a more upbeat track, and began working on "Locals (Girls Like Us)" to fill that role. She later sent its instrumental to frequent collaborator Gabby Start, who had featured on several of her songs. Start described it as an "absolutely crazy beat", immediately wanting to "hop on" the song after his first listen.

"Locals (Girl Like Us)" was released as the third single for Wallsocket on July 12, 2023, via Mom + Pop. The album's title and cover art, along with its release date, were announced alongside the single. It breaks the three-act structure (Note: The three-act structure does not refer to how the songs are sequenced on Wallsocket, but how they were released as singles.) established by the music videos for previous singles "Cops and Robbers", “You Don't Even Know Who I Am" and "Old Money Bitch" was later released in August as the third act. Of the three, it acts as an intermission between “You Don’t Even Know Who I Am” and “Old Money Bitch. The song was accompanied by a video, with its creation credited to both artists alongside Underscores's frequent video collaborator, Ayodeji, and Chris Yellen. Wallsocket was later released on September 22, 2023, featuring "Locals (Girl Like Us)" as its second track. Underscores frequently performed the song while touring for the album, considering it one of her favorite tracks to play live; she later told Beat that it was "engineered so that there would be a moment for people to open a moshpit".

== Composition ==
Critics tended to characterize "Locals (Girl Like Us)" as encompassing a variety of genres, including electroclash, glitch pop, and hyperpop. They often compared its sound to other artists; Lisa Mag of DIY called it a hyperpop version of American musical duo Sleigh Bells, while Dork's Ali Shutler found it to mix styles from artists like Lady Gaga, Nine Inch Nails, and Gorillaz. Several reviewers compared its beat to Kesha's early work, with The Line of Best Fit's Matthew Kim noting it had "a dance-pop instrumental that early Kesha could have faux-rapped over" and Paste's Natalie Marlin describing its sound as "somewhere between early Kesha's snark pop and the sneering electroclash of Peaches". The song's sonics mainly consist of electronic instruments, with a guitar riff coming in during its breakdown. Its production uses "intense" side-chaining, which Ella Sterand of Junkee pointed out as an instance of Wallsocket "exploring both ends of the compression dial" in the album's loud and quiet moments.

"Locals" (Girls Like Us)" follows three young girls who live in the town of Wallsocket, the album's fictional setting. The song is presented as a coming-of-age story, with each girl trying to learn how to grow up following the bank robbery that takes place in "Cops and Robbers", concluding by the album's closing track, "Good Luck Final Girl". The song opens with vocal overlays, which slow down into the repeated motif of "Arms, body, legs, flesh, skin, bone, sinew, good luck". Its anthemic chorus features the chant "Stop me if you've heard this one before / Girls like us are rotten to the core," which The Music's Ellie Robinson interpreted as "defiantly flip[ping] transphobic rhetoric".

== Critical reception ==
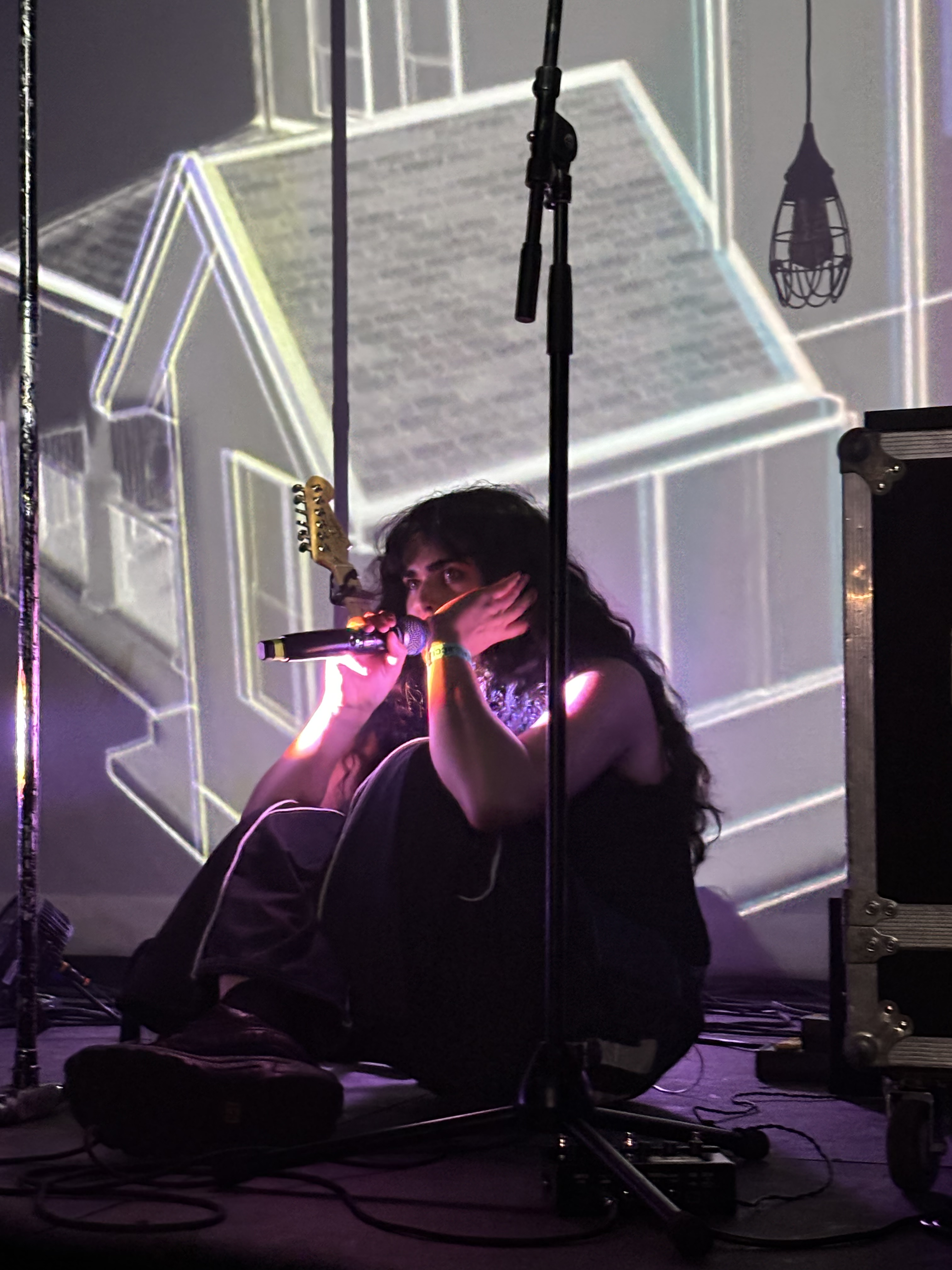
Critics often praised Underscores's production and writing on "Locals (Girls Like Us)".

"Locals (Girls Like Us)" received positive reviews from music critics. Victoria Lewis of When the Horn Blows called it "an ever evolving track that grows to new heights through each verse, chorus and breakdown", describing its sound as "fun and outgoing", feeling it "catches your attention on the first listen." She also praised Start's vocal performance, calling it "smooth" and "electric". Le Canal Auditif's Stéphane Deslauriers found the song to be "[a] rather original dance piece", noting that it is not confined to one particular genre. Writing for Ringtone, Amelia Zollner remarked it was her favorite of Wallsocket's four singles, praising its chorus and place in the album's storyline.

== Personnel ==
Credits are adapted from Underscores's website and the liner notes of Wallsocket.

- Underscores – songwriting, production, recording, engineering, mixing
- Gabby Start – songwriting, production
- Heba Kadry – mastering
