= Underscores (musician) =

American musician (born 2000)

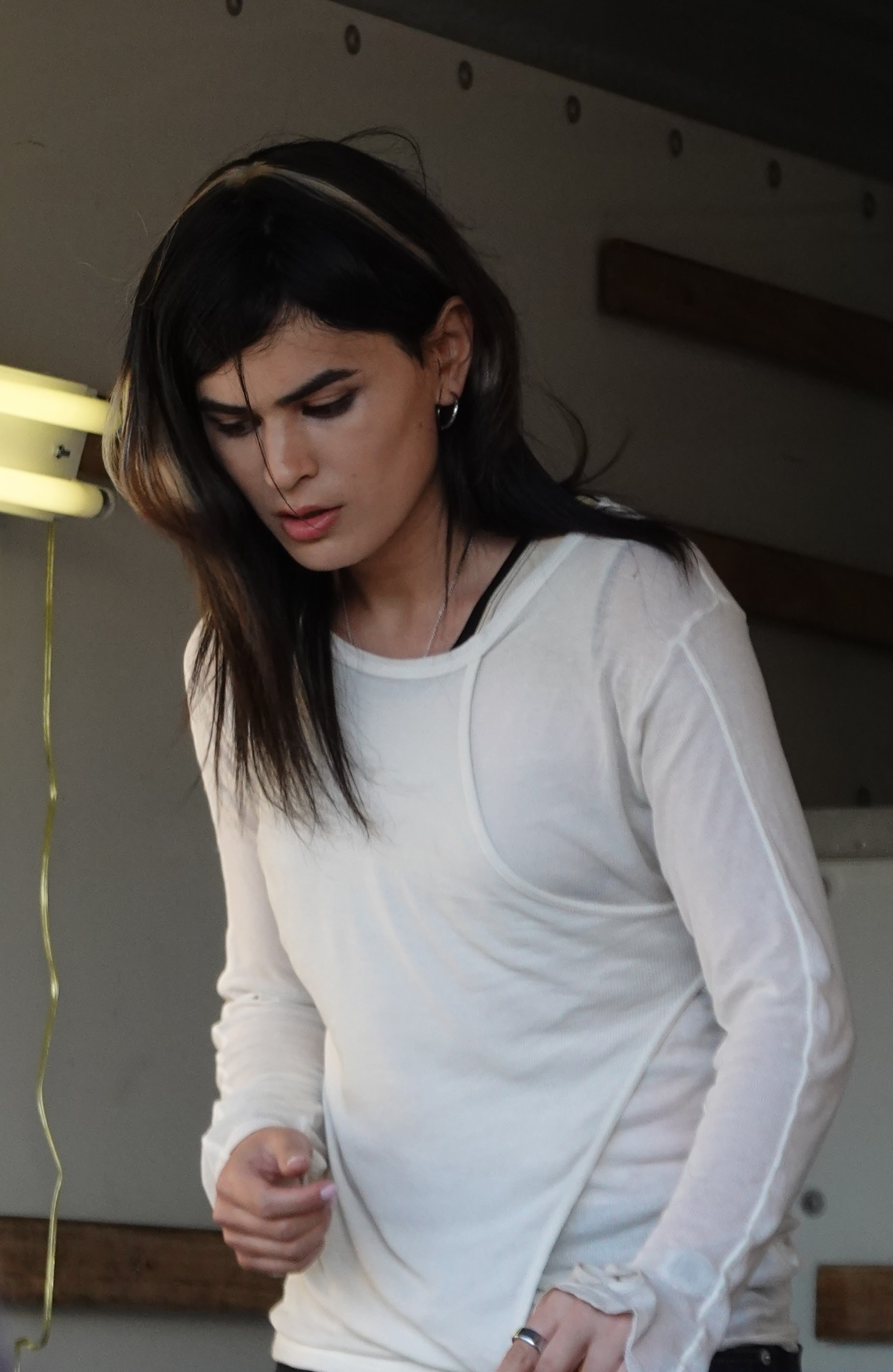
- Grey performing in 2026

Background information
- Also known as: April Harper Grey; Milkfish; olivia offseason
- Born: Devon Grey Karpf; April 21, 2000 (age 26); San Francisco, California, U.S.
- Genres: Hyperpop; Electropop; dubstep
- Occupations: Singer-songwriter; producer
- Works: Discography
- Years active: 2013–present
- Labels: Mom + Pop; Corporate Rockmusic; DeadAir; Bitbird; Good Enuff
- Member of: Six Impala; Papaya & Friends
- Formerly of: Nematic
- Website: underscores.plus

Devon Grey Karpf (born April 21, 2000), known professionally as April Harper Grey and performing as Underscores (stylized in all-lowercase), is an American singer-songwriter and producer. Born in San Francisco, California, Grey began releasing dubstep music on SoundCloud at the age of 13. After releasing three EPs from 2018 to 2020 that incorporated other genres such as jazz and future bass, she rose to prominence with her hyperpop and rock-influenced debut album Fishmonger in early 2021. She released its companion EP and opened for 100 Gecs on tour later that year.

Grey performed her first headlining tour in early 2022, and released her second album Wallsocket in 2023 on Mom + Pop Music. It featured a wider range of musical styles, and was promoted with an alternate reality game and a tour of North America and Europe. In March 2026, she released her third studio album, U, to critical acclaim. Grey opened on tour for Charli XCX in the fall of 2026.

Grey's early influences include Skrillex and 100 Gecs. Her musical style has encompassed genres such as hyperpop, pop-punk, dubstep, dance-pop, indie pop, folk, rock, and emo.

== Early life ==
Devon Grey Karpf was born on April 21, 2000, in the Miraloma Park neighborhood of San Francisco, California, to a Filipina mother and a white father. Her father, Ryan Downe, had previously worked as an audio engineer and released a studio album under Elton John's record label, The Rocket Record Company. Before coming out as a trans woman, she attended Cathedral School for Boys, a prestigious all-boys elementary school affiliated with the Episcopal Diocese of California, for nine years, where she visited church three times a week. In an interview with the Sydney Morning Herald, Grey remarked that the Episcopal Church is "the chillest denomination" and that it was "pretty open" compared to its Roman Catholic counterpart. However, she has stated that her parents did not raise her to be religious like them. As a child, Grey wrote short stories, created films using iMovie, and ran a YouTube channel with Let's Plays of the video game Minecraft.

Growing up, Grey listened to artists like Jack White, Beck, Lucinda Williams, and Van Morrison, as well as pop stars like Madonna, Britney Spears, and Justin Timberlake. She has specified Madonna's Music (2000) as the first album she remembers listening to. Grey became interested in composing music at the age of six. As a child, she produced beat loops and burned them onto CDs using her father's computer. She also experimented with GarageBand. In the early 2010s, Grey discovered Skrillex and the dubstep genre and was attracted to its sound design possibilities, akin to "rocket science". Spencer Kornhaber of The Atlantic wrote: "In high school, [she] became a jazz-band geek with a penchant for music theory". She also listened to Midwest emo and math rock music during high school. Around this time, she co-founded the collective Six Impala. She attended New York University to study music, where she began performing under the pseudonym Milkfish.

== Career ==
=== 2013–2020: Career beginnings ===
At the age of 13, Grey began releasing dubstep music as Underscores on SoundCloud. For years, she released a stream of "one-offs", such as her 2015 single "Mild Season", but she eventually became bored of "using the same sounds" and began incorporating other influences. In 2016, Grey released several mixes as a competitor in the Monstercat Mix Contest, where she ultimately placed second. She released the jazz–EDM extended play (EP) Skin Purifying Treatment in 2018. It was the first project she wrote lyrics for and she has cited it as where her early style solidified. Grey followed it with the EP We Never Got Strawberry Cake in 2019. She designed its cover and uploaded it to DistroKid immediately after completion. She has noted it as the project she is most proud of, explaining, "Because I didn't give myself ample time to start resenting it". In 2020, Grey released the EP Character Development!. Grey created the YouTube channel 2ndgenbias in 2020, where she released videos analyzing K-pop song structures.

=== 2021–2023: Fishmonger ===
Grey released her debut album Fishmonger in March 2021. It features appearances from 8485, Gabby Start, (Note: Formerly Knapsack.) and Maxwell Young, and was preceded by the singles "Second Hand Embarrassment" and "Kinko's Field Trip 2006". She recorded it at her parents' house amidst the COVID-19 pandemic. Despite having no prior experience, she incorporated guitar into every track because she had "run out of production tricks" and did not like any piano voicings. Fishmonger appeared on The Atlantic's list of the 10 best albums of 2021 and The Line of Best Fit's list of the 15 best hyperpop albums. They complimented its combination of hyperpop with pop-punk, rock, and indie genres. Fishmonger also drew the attention of high-profile musicians such as Glaive, Lido, and Travis Barker of Blink-182. Upon release, Lido sent the album to Dorothy Caccavale of ATC Management, who eventually became Grey's manager alongside Jackson Perry. In late 2021, Grey toured as an opening act for 100 Gecs on the U.S. leg of their 10,000 Gecs tour. A follow-up EP to Fishmonger, titled Boneyard AKA Fearmonger, was released in December. It features drums from Barker and co-production from Brakence. The EP was inspired by her feelings of paralyzation and existential dread after releasing Fishmonger, in which she did not write music for five months. She tried to adapt these feelings into an apocalyptic setting. Until the idea for a song had formed, she did not allow herself to open the digital audio workstation Ableton.

Grey embarked on her first headlining mini-tour from February–March 2022. She also performed on Lollapalooza's opening day, July 28, at the T-Mobile stage in Grant Park, Chicago. She then featured in the social networking service Discord's mini-documentary titled Discord Scenes: Underground Pop Music. Grey released the pop song "Count of Three (You Can Eat $#@!)" in January 2023, which she dubbed "the last piece of the Fishmonger era". It features production from Dylan Brady and Cashmere Cat, as well as writing from Benny Blanco.

=== 2023–2025: Wallsocket ===
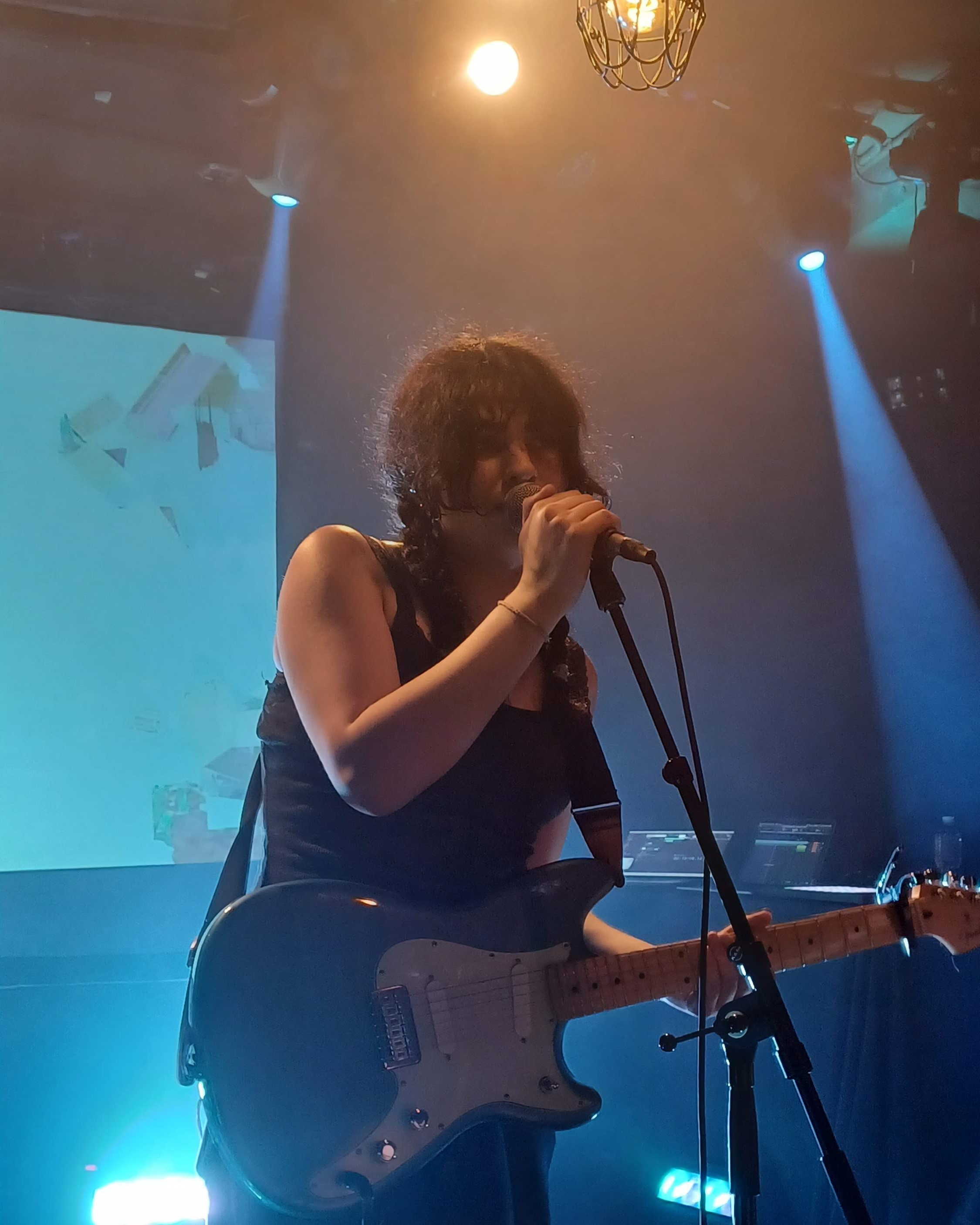
Grey performing in October 2023

In April 2023, Grey released a "Wallsocket era" trailer, following it with the lead single "Cops and Robbers" in May. In June, she released a second single, "You Don't Even Know Who I Am". The Wallsocket album and its release date were announced in July alongside a third single, "Locals (Girls Like Us)", which features Gabby Start. On July 13, Grey embarked on the North American leg of her second headlining tour, the Hometown Tour. A fourth single, "Old Money Bitch", was released in August. Wallsocket was released on September 22, 2023, on the Mom + Pop record label. Alongside the tour, it was promoted with an alternate reality game (ARG) involving websites of a fictional Wallsocket, Michigan, town. The album features additional appearances from Henhouse! and Jane Remover. It received acclaim for its character-driven narrative and "eclectic" mix of genres. (Note: Attributed to multiple references:) Grey began a European leg of the Hometown Tour on November 30. The single "My Guy (Corporate Shuffle)" was released in May 2024. It was included on Wallsocket (Director's Cut), a deluxe edition of the album which was released in June, alongside three other tracks. In October 2024, Grey appeared and produced on the single "Harvest Sky" by Oklou. A month later, she released a cover of "Headlock" by Imogen Heap to her SoundCloud.

=== 2025–present: U ===
In March 2025, Grey featured as NME's cover artist, discussing her past and present career, upcoming album, and a then-unreleased collaboration with Umru, later released as the single "Poplife" in April 2025. The month after her cover story, she performed during both weeks of Coachella 2025, playing "Copycats", a then-unreleased song with rapper Danny Brown, and "Music", later released in June 2025 as the lead single for her next project. The second single, "Do It", was released in November 2025, receiving a remix featuring South Korean singer Yves in January 2026. The third and final single, "Tell Me (U Want It)", released in February of that year, followed by the album being officially announced with the name U. On March 2, Grey announced the "GALLERIA: North American Chapter" tour with special guest Umru to support the album. The tour began on May 27 in Los Angeles and concluded on June 26 in San Francisco. On April 27, Grey announced the "GALLERIA: European Chapter" alongside special guest Umru to support the album, set to begin on October 30, in Turin and conclude on November 15, in Bristol.

On June 8, 2026, Grey was announced to be the opening act for Charli XCX's Music, Fashion, Film Tour, which Grey had to cancel a number of shows in September to fulfill. In July, she made a surprise appearance at a Charli XCX show to perform "Music" in Brooklyn. Grey once again appeared as a magazine's cover artist through The Fader, with the story being promoted by a DJ set hosted by them. She released the single "Unlimited Love" and a remix of "The Peace" with Frost Children in August 2026. In September, Grey was announced to join the All Things Go Festival, and Coachella in November. On November 16, Grey received a nomination in the 69th Annual Grammy Awards in the Best Dance/Electronic Recording category for the single "Music", making her the first transgender woman nominated in the category.

== Artistry ==
=== Influences ===
Elias Leight of Rolling Stone highlighted Grey's liberal citing of influences, specifically, the U.K. garage of PinkPantheress and the Madonna–Nicki Minaj collaboration "Bitch I'm Madonna" (2015). While producing dubstep, she was inspired by Skrillex's "signature growl noise" and his EP Scary Monsters and Nice Sprites (2010). Grey gained the confidence to use her voice from how Laura Les, another trans woman, manipulated her vocals in alignment with her identity. As well, the popularity of 100 Gecs affirmed to Grey that there was an audience for "weird", "distorted", and "funny" music.

For Flood Magazine, Grey listed 12 artists that had influenced Wallsocket. These included Madonna, The Raconteurs, Sky Ferreira, Jason Isbell, Kwon Jin-ah, and Gillian Welch, as well as artists she listened to during childhood. In the interview, she identified songwriting inspiration from Imogen Heap, storytelling inspiration from Bruce Springsteen's Nebraska (1982), and conceptual inspiration from Sufjan Stevens's Michigan (2003) and Illinois (2005). Other Wallsocket influences include the pedal steel guitar, harmonica, and slide guitar involved in country music, as well as the 2010s pop of Marina and the Diamonds, Justin Timberlake, and Kesha. For Office, Grey said that Wallsocket was inspired by social commentary on the American class system within slasher films. She also cited horror films set in rural America as influences, like The Texas Chain Saw Massacre (1974) and Bones and All (2022). Wallsocket's rollout was inspired by Halo 2's ARG I Love Bees, the marketing campaign for the 2008 film Cloverfield, and the screenplay and short film companion to Childish Gambino's Because the Internet (2013).

=== Musical style ===
Grey is a producer and singer-songwriter. Her music has been described as hyperpop, pop-punk, dubstep, electropop, indie pop, electronica, rock, and Midwest emo. Grey's early dubstep music experimented with structure due to her perception that the genre was traditionally limited to filling in a template. Her debut album Fishmonger is a hyperpop record with elements of rock, emo, pop-punk, indie pop, ambience, and dubstep. Touching on celebrity culture, the album drew comparisons to 1990s alt-rock, as well as bands like MGMT and Cobra Starship. Fishmonger's follow-up EP, Boneyard AKA Fearmonger, is a fusion of pop-punk, dubstep, drum and bass, and new wave, also containing ballads. Its lyrics discuss anxiety, existence, and generational apathy, and like Fishmonger, it is set in a seaside New Jersey town. Grey's second album Wallsocket is primarily pop, rock, folk, and country, with punk, shoegaze, trap, and emo influences. (Note: Attributed to multiple references:) Some publications noted it as having moved on from hyperpop, Grey calling the genre "officially dead" in a 2023 NME interview. Wallsocket is a Michigan-set concept album about three girls navigating adulthood. It involves themes of gun violence, trans identity, corporatization, and religion. (Note: Attributed to multiple references:)

The Guardian's Aneesa Ahmed wrote that Grey has a "very gen-Z disregard for genre boundaries" and The Fader's Jordan Darville said she has an "all in" approach to dissolving genre guardrails. Likewise, The Line of Best Fit's Noah Simon and Matthew Kim wrote that Grey's "stylistic range is vast" and that she "has always been known for eclecticism". Spencer Kornhaber of The Atlantic noted that Grey uses technology to sing beyond physical limits. Kornhaber described her music as "nonbinary both in form and in content", linking it to the LGBT community. Nico Tripodi for Pigeons & Planes thought that half of her appeal was her refreshing production, yet "behind the turbulent sonics, there always lies a song that would sound just as good stripped down." Similarly, i-D's Frankie Dunn called Grey's sound nostalgic and playful, while Leight of Rolling Stone described her as "precise about process". Grey herself called the production of Boneyard AKA Fearmonger "super anal [and] type-A". In a DIY interview, Grey said that her music tries to "[be] serious about being tongue in cheek", and in a Paste interview, that she is afraid of solely retreading, and instead tries to fuse many "bygone sounds". For Metal, she wrote that she identified with "new prog pop", a genre coined by her friend, defining it as: "Conceptual prog music formatted in albums, usually made by one person or a small group in their bedroom". She also stated that she does not mind the, often divisive, hyperpop categorization.

== Other projects ==
Grey is a member of the experimental electronic collective Six Impala and the bedroom pop band Papaya & Friends. She also releases music under the alias Milkfish. She was part of the dubstep group Nematic, who have since disbanded. Grey composed the score for the short film Ben's Sister (2025), releasing it to streaming under the April Harper Grey name on May 29, 2026. In April 2026, Grey released the song "DTW" under her alternate YouTube account olivia offseason, which she mainly uses to post vlogs.

== Personal life ==
Grey is a trans woman, and idolized singer Laura Les of the duo 100 Gecs in her upbringing. Her 2018 EP Skin Purifying Treatment is largely about the questioning of her gender. In an interview with Pitchfork, she stated that being transgender was "all that [she] could think about in high school", and that music "was one of the ways that could help [her] deal with it". Grey took the stage name April, as she felt fans calling her Devon was too personal. However, she does not go by April in her daily life and does not consider Devon to be a deadname.

Grey has stated that she is theistic, and described Wallsocket as her "reckoning with figuring out if I wanted to return, or if I felt represented with God." She described her belief in a higher power "holding your hand through life" as "a really beautiful thing." As of 2026, she lives in an apartment in Chicago.

== Discography ==
Studio albums

- Fishmonger (2021)
- Wallsocket (2023)
- U (2026)

== Tours ==
=== Headlining tours ===
- Gone Fishin' Mini-tour (with Patchymate, Torr, Folie, TYGKO, LAN Party, Jedwill, Juno, CMTEN, and Chuck Sutton) (2022)
- The Hometown Tour (with Torr, Jedwill, Thoom, and Babymorocco) (2023–2024)
- Galleria World Tour (with Umru) (2026)

=== Supporting tours ===
- 10000 gecs Tour (with 100 Gecs) (2021)
- Smile :D World Tour (with Porter Robinson) (2025)
- Stardust Tour (with Danny Brown and Femtanyl) (2025)
- Music, Fashion, Film Tour (with Charli XCX) (2026)

== Awards and nominations ==
Name of the award ceremony, year presented, category, nominee(s) of the award, and the result of the nomination
Award	Year	Category	Nominee(s)	Result	Ref.
Grammy Awards	2027	Best Dance/Electronic Recording	"Music"	Pending	
