= Wallsocket =

2023 studio album by Underscores

Studio album by Underscores
- Released: September 22, 2023
- Recorded: 2022–2023
- Genres: Pop; rock; folk
- Length: 54:55
- Labels: Mom + Pop; Corporate Rockmusic
- Producers: Underscores; Gabby Start; Henhouse!; Jane Remover

Underscores chronology
| Boneyard AKA Fearmonger (2021) | Wallsocket (2023) | Covergirl: Originally by Sonny (2024) |

Director's Cut cover

Singles from Wallsocket
- 1. "Cops and Robbers" Released: May 3, 2023; 2. "You Don't Even Know Who I Am" Released: June 7, 2023; 3. "Locals (Girls Like Us)" Released: July 12, 2023; 4. "Old Money Bitch" Released: August 16, 2023

Wallsocket is the second studio album by the American musician Underscores. It was released by Mom + Pop Music on September 22, 2023. After rising to prominence with her debut album Fishmonger in March 2021, Underscores began recording Wallsocket in January 2022, with a higher budget than its predecessor. The album is based upon the fictional setting of Wallsocket, Michigan, inspired by the Idaho home of her grandparents, social commentary on the upper middle class in slasher films, and rural American horror films. The songs were written acoustically first and inspired by country and blues sonics, as well as 2010s pop aesthetics. The album features collaborations with Gabby Start, Henhouse!, and Jane Remover.

Wallsocket is primarily pop, rock, and folk, with a large sonic palette and stark turns. A concept album about three girls navigating adulthood, it explores themes of corporatization, religion, gun violence, and class resentment. Across the album's characters, Underscores also discussed transgender identity and the horseshoe theory. Wallsocket was promoted with four singles, a tour across North America, Europe, Asia, and Australia, and an alternate reality game involving websites of its fictional town setting. Critics praised the album's frenzied production and character-driven narrative, and many considered it an improvement over Fishmonger. Several publications featured it on their year-end lists.

== Background ==
Underscores released her debut album Fishmonger in March 2021. It drew the attention of high-profile musicians such as Glaive, Lido, and Travis Barker of Blink-182. It also landed on The Atlantic's list of the 10 best albums of 2021 and The Line of Best Fit's list of the 15 best hyperpop albums, whose Noah Simon said it "skyrocketed Underscores into vaunted air within [the] scene". She released a follow-up extended play, Boneyard AKA Fearmonger, in December 2021, and then "Count of Three (You Can Eat $#@!)", in January 2023. She dubbed the track "the last piece of the Fishmonger era", and The Fader's David Renshaw called it the start of her next chapter.

== Development ==
=== Writing ===
Underscores signed with Mom + Pop Music for Wallsocket. A record label budget allowed her to be more ambitious and focus on immersion. The album is set in the fictional town of Wallsocket, Michigan. According to Underscores, though her previous projects Fishmonger and Boneyard AKA Fearmonger were inspired by New Jersey, Wallsocket was the most geographically focused of the three. Wallsocket, Michigan, was inspired by Scandinavian architecture and nostalgic memories of her grandparents's Idaho home. The upper middle class suburban environment she grew up around, which she tried to replicate, spurred themes of coming of age. Similarly, the trope of upper middle class citizens as targets within slasher films interested her. Underscores was also interested by horror films about the beauty of rural America, like The Texas Chain Saw Massacre (1974) and Bones and All (2022). Through the setting, she tried to evoke feelings of sonder, microcosm, and confinement. Across the album, she wanted to question who benefits from upper middle class society and, within it, if people of different backgrounds can coexist. Such existential questions across the album and "Wallsocket era" trailer were ones she wished she had considered before moving out at the age of 18. Wallsocket's rollout was inspired by Halo 2's alternate reality game (ARG) I Love Bees, the marketing campaign for the 2008 film Cloverfield, and the screenplay and short film companion to Childish Gambino's Because the Internet (2013).

While worldbuilding for Wallsocket, Underscores used whiteboards and many flowcharts to keep track of its components. At one point, her father entered her room and said: "I think your label's gonna think you're crazy. I don't know if they know who they signed." The writing process involved Underscores deciding what to discuss from her experiences, then funneling it into the album's fictional characters. On the album cover and across the characters, she tried to symbolize an apolitical interpretation of the horseshoe theory. For Paste, she said: "When I first brought up the idea of the horseshoe theory, I didn't really dig into it at all, and I think people were like, 'What the fuck is she talking about? I don't hear this anywhere.'" Underscores eventually warmed up to the theory and began viewing parts of her life through it, preferring the extreme ends, rather than the stagnant centre. Similarly, while writing Wallsocket, her mindset switched from pessimism to optimism, which led to happy endings for many characters that she did not foresee. Confrontations with spiritual beliefs and relationships to organized religion are similarly common among the characters. Underscores was driven by her somewhat religious upbringing to determine if she felt represented by God or wished to return to religion. Wallsocket also explores themes of transgender identity, which, as a trans woman, Underscores was reluctant to write about, thinking she "wouldn't sink to that". After concluding that this was a self-hating mentality, she eventually knew Wallsocket "needed [...] a trans character" and tried to address trans intersectionality.

=== Production ===
With the exception of features, Underscores wrote, produced, and performed each song on Wallsocket. She challenged herself to write each one acoustically before adding production. "Old Money Bitch" was the first track she wrote. She started it in January 2022 after buying a banjo from Craigslist intent on "making a pop banger". The single "Cops and Robbers" was also an early idea. "You Don't Even Know Who I Am" originated as a demo titled "New World 2007", which Underscores became satisfied with after months of reworking. After she sent the beat of "Locals (Girls Like Us)" to Gabby Start, he became determined to feature. She also thought Henhouse! would match the frenetic energy of "Geez Louise". Her goal for "Johnny Johnny Johnny" was a fun but taboo pop song, akin to Foster the People's "Pumped Up Kicks" (2010).

On Wallsocket, Underscores tried to incorporate sounds she had not previously used. Among these were the country and blues sonics that made her feel good, like the pedal steel guitar, harmonica, slide guitar, and brushed snare drum. Underscores drew from such childhood artists as Beck, Jack White, and Lucinda Williams, as well as 2010s pop musicians like Marina and the Diamonds, Justin Timberlake, and Kesha. The pop star Madonna, and the unconventional genres which Music (2000) blended, were other large influences. In an interview with Flood Magazine, Underscores listed 12 artists that had influenced Wallsocket. She stressed lyrical inspiration from Imogen Heap, storytelling inspiration from Bruce Springsteen's Nebraska (1982), and conceptual inspiration from Sufjan Stevens's Michigan (2003) and Illinois (2005). For the album, she compiled and shuffled a 37 hour and 11 minute inspiration playlist titled "22-gauge shotgun".

== Composition ==
=== Overview ===
Wallsocket is primarily pop, rock, and folk, with influences of emo, punk, country, trap, funk, and dubstep. Some publications thought it contained elements of hyperpop or subverted the genre, while others felt it had moved on. (Note: Underscores called the genre "officially dead" in a 2023 NME interview, but clarified with Paste that "the mentality of trying to create something new that hasn't been heard before has not died".) The album has 12 long tracks, which according to Ali Shutler of NME, maintain an excitable, "Euphoria meets Desperate Housewives" punch. He believed the album pulled from a large sonic palette, which Paste's Natalie Marlin thought was the widest Underscores had yet to operate in. DIY's Lisa Wright wrote that Wallsocket had "10,000 sonic ideas" and The Line of Best Fit's Matthew Kim called it the year's most heterogeneous album. Moreover, she noted its stark turns, and he wrote that, "Sometimes, the album's whiplash-inducing pivots appear multiple times on the same song".

Wallsocket is a concept album about three girls navigating adulthood; (Note: Underscores noted with Paste and NME that although she did not perceive Wallsocket as a concept album, she agreed that it was one.) each track follows a citizen of Wallsocket, Michigan, typically young or troubled, and canonically, Underscores is only a lurker taking notes. Kim compared the album to a short story anthology, while Steve Erickson wrote for Slant Magazine that each song "flit[s] from one style or tone to the next, mirroring the mental states of [the] characters." Erickson thought the album had a mature sound, though many of its songs were youthful. Likewise, The Atlantic's Spencer Kornhaber described Wallsocket as the result of "Gen Z's unprecedented, tech-mediated experience of global tensions". Erickson also compared the album's song structures to 1970s art rock, but he thought Wallsocket described the circumstances of present-day America, like the feeling that the country is regressing into inequality and of a need to escape town. Otherwise, Wallsocket involves themes of corporatization, gun violence, alienation, and class resentment.

=== Songs ===
The opening track "Cops and Robbers" is a brash power pop and garage rock song. Kim of The Line of Best Fit called its lyrics "teasing", which follow a bank teller fleeing from Wallsocket, Michigan, after scamming his customers to pay for his meth addiction. "Locals (Girls Like Us)", which drew comparisons to Kesha, is an electroclash song with a dance-pop instrumental and hyperpop elements about the coming of age of a group of local girls. The grunge and pop "Duhhhhhhhhhhhhhhhhh" contains glitchy production, spoken loops of the title, as well as relaxed percussion and synthesizer. It follows a Christian transgender kid struggling with her identity and the religious guilt that comes with it, ending in a guitar and harmonica climax. "You Don't Even Know Who I Am", a slowcore song which drew comparisons to "Today" (1993) by the Smashing Pumpkins, describes a teenager who stalks and romanticizes her neighbour. "Johnny Johnny Johnny" recalls a transgender teen being groomed online and escaping an in-person encounter. An electropop and dance-punk track, its refrain repeats the titular playground chant.

"Geez Louise"
"Geez Louise" has been cited as Wallsocket's most erratic track. Shifting between metal, alt-country, bedroom pop, and shoegaze, it discusses colonization, gender identity, and Catholicism.

For DIY, Wright described "Shoot to Kill, Kill Your Darlings" as a "woozy Beck lollop". Its lyrics question why a rich kid would want to join the military. "Horror Movie Soundtrack" is written from the viewpoint of a dying soldier atop a twangy, faint, and dissonant guitar. Shutler described it for Dork as "creeping" and "uneas[y]" and Kim called it "lyrically terse, vague and pained". The following "Old Money Bitch" is an upbeat, synth-layered, electropop song about the title character being ruthlessly bullied for trying to hide her billionaire upbringing. The seven-minute "Geez Louise" shifts from a metal, industrial rock, and punk rant to an alt-country passage with hand claps, then a subdued acoustic guitar section and a shoegaze climax. In it, Underscores and Henhouse! discuss how Spanish colonization phased out the traditional third Filipino gender in favor of Catholicism. "Seventyseven Dog Years" is a Midwest emo song with a minimalist club beat. It features body horror imagery alongside the following "Uncanny Long Arms", which has a power pop guitar climax adapted from the Fishmonger track "Kinko's Field Trip 2006". Critic Anthony Fantano described the closing track "Good Luck Final Girl" as a "folksy tune [where] elegant and shimmering strings quickly melt away [into a] bare, naked, stark outro". Shutler called it escapist.

== Promotion and release ==
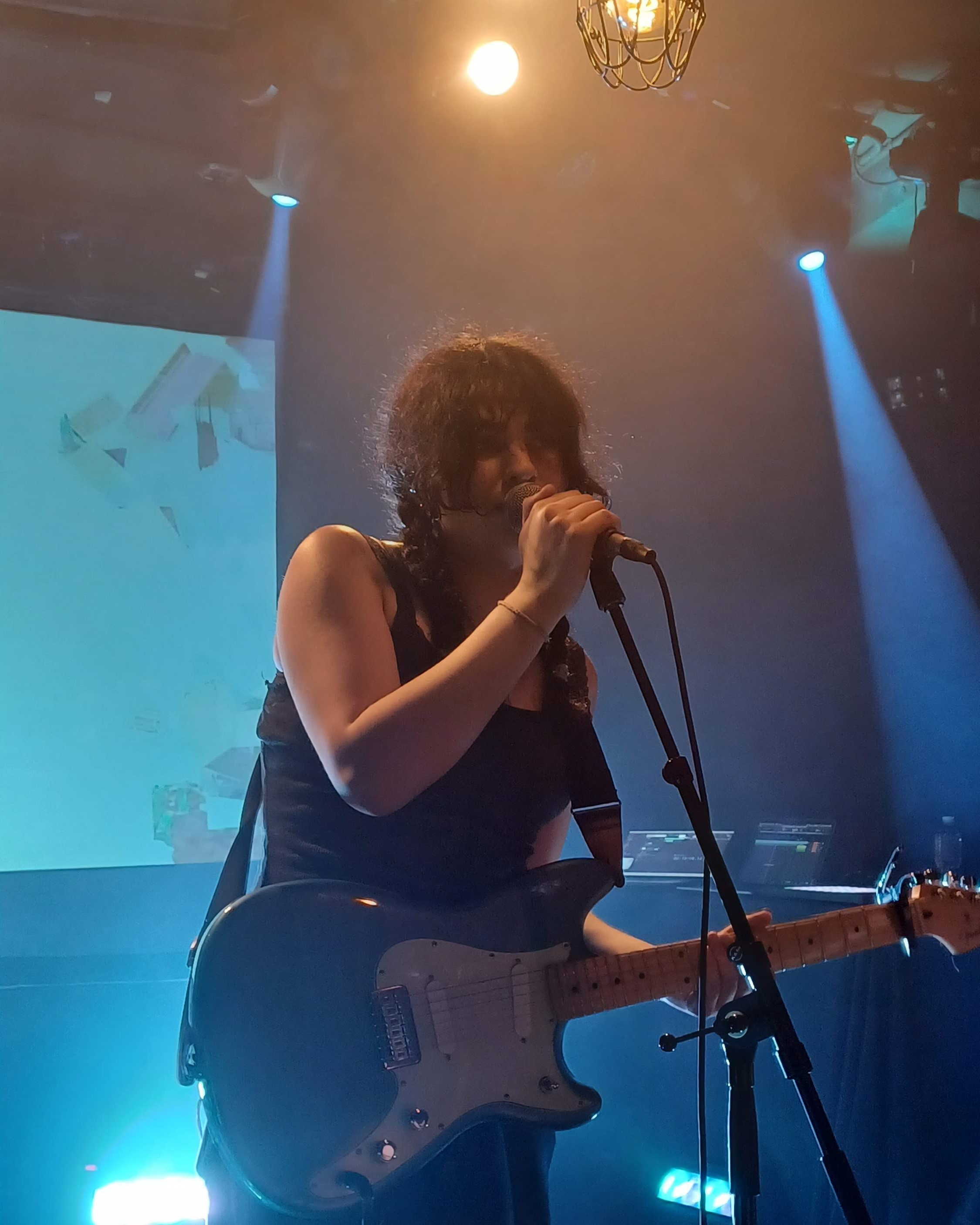
Underscores performing in Washington, D.C., during the Hometown Tour (2023)

Underscores began the "Wallsocket era" with a trailer and statement posted to social media on April 21, 2023. Websites of a fictional Wallsocket, Michigan, town then began appearing, such as an official town site, a "Moms of Wallsocket" forum, and a pizza restaurant serving as a merchandise giveaway. They were part of a promotional ARG, which fans shared information about through Discord.

Wallsocket's lead single "Cops and Robbers" was released on May 3, 2023, alongside an announcement that she had signed to Mom + Pop Music. Underscores followed it with a second single, "You Don't Even Know Who I Am", on June 7. That month, she announced the North American leg of a supporting Hometown Tour, which she began on July 13. Before her sets, she handed out pizza boxes with a misspelled URL of the restaurant, leading to an unreleased song. On July 12, Underscores officially announced the Wallsocket album and its release date alongside a third single, "Locals (Girls Like Us)", which features Gabby Start. Another single, "Old Money Bitch", was released on August 16. The music videos for the singles were directed by her friend Ayodeji and shot using iPhones.

Wallsocket was released on September 22, 2023, via Mom + Pop Music and Corporate Rockmusic. That month, Underscores announced a European leg of the Hometown Tour, subtitled "The Away Games", which she began on November 30. Dates for Japan and Australia, which began on May 24, 2024, were revealed in March. On May 28, Underscores released the single "My Guy (Corporate Shuffle)", which was included alongside three other tracks on Wallsocket (Director's Cut), a deluxe edition of the album.

== Critical reception ==
Professional ratings
Review scores
| Source | Rating |
|---|---|
| DIY | 4.5/5 stars |
| Dork | 4/5 stars |
| The Line of Best Fit | 9/10 |
| Slant Magazine | 3.5/5 stars |
| The Needle Drop | 8/10 (Note: Specifically, Fantano rated the album a "decent to strong 8".) |

Wallsocket received critical acclaim. For DIY, Lisa Wright called it "the sound of an artist operating entirely [and] brilliantly on their own terms." The Line of Best Fit's Matthew Kim deemed it her masterpiece: "if it doesn't propel her into indie stardom, we've all done something wrong." Anthony Fantano thought it was one of the year's most daring, varied, and catchy records, and the Star Tribune's Ethan Lambert thought it was among the hyperpop scene's strongest recent albums.

Many critics considered its production and composition an improvement over Fishmonger, though some thought they were occasionally too chaotic. Steve Erickson of Slant Magazine complimented the album's "bratty, intentionally jarring spin on hyperpop" as "eclecticism for its own sake". He thought Underscores had noticeably matured her sound and perspective. Likewise, Wright thought Wallsocket had substantially evolved from Fishmonger's bedroom production, and Lambert elaborated that it "expertly fus[ed] glitchy electronic production with alternative rock". He believed the album was very catchy, alongside Kim, who highlighted the choruses of structured pop songs like "Cops and Robbers" and "Old Money Bitch". Kim concluded that the album worked just as well on shuffle than in order, and praised it as a continuation of the eclecticism Underscores had become known for. Similarly, Dork's Ali Shutler thought Wallsocket thrived on its big swings. Conversely, Wright thought that its sharp turns sometimes undermined the softer moments and that "Horror Movie Soundtrack" was very sudden. Citing passages of "Uncanny Long Arms", the drums of "Seventyseven Dog Years", and the end of "Shoot to Kill, Kill Your Darlings", Fantano said that some tracks were "a little too much", as they were too saturated with volume and color.

Critics enjoyed the pairing of musical ideas with a character-driven narrative. The Atlantic's Spencer Kornhaber believed that the album used production as a storytelling tool by "dramatizing a world gone weird." Jordan Darville of The Fader stated that, on the album, Underscores had refined her "all in" approach to transgressing genres by "let[ting] the narratives — sometimes hilarious, sometimes devastating — shine through." Kim argued that the album's broad sonic palette was not due to self-indulgence and that Underscores used musical ideas to characterize each resident in a "remarkably adept" way. He thought each character had a distinctive voice: "every emotion [is] conveyed wholly through a varied set of sounds and writing styles." Otherwise, Erickson compared the album to Emma Seligman's Bottoms (2023) and the high school horror films of Jennifer Reeder. He thought they all recounted the lives of ordinary characters while subverting genre tropes.

=== Year-end lists ===
Wallsocket appeared in the top 15 spots of the best albums of 2023 lists of The Atlantic, Pedestrian, and The Needle Drop. It also appeared 33rd on Slant Magazine's list, and in an unranked list of the year's best electronic albums by Paste.

| Publication | List | Rank | Ref. |
|---|---|---|---|
| The Atlantic | 10 Best Albums of 2023 | 7 | |
| Slant Magazine | 50 Best Albums of 2023 | 33 | |
| Paste | 25 Best Electronic Albums of 2023 | —N/a | |
| Pedestrian | 50 Best Albums of 2023 | 4 | |
| The Needle Drop | Top 50 Albums of 2023 | 13 | |

== Track listing ==
All tracks are written and produced by April Harper Grey except where noted.

Wallsocket track listing
| No. | Title | Writer(s) | Producer(s) | Length |
|---|---|---|---|---|
| 1. | "Cops and Robbers" | | | 4:25 |
| 2. | "Locals (Girls Like Us)" (featuring Gabby Start) | Grey; Gabriel O'Leary | Grey; O'Leary | 4:18 |
| 3. | "Duhhhhhhhhhhhhhhhhh" | | | 4:07 |
| 4. | "You Don't Even Know Who I Am" | | | 4:04 |
| 5. | "Johnny Johnny Johnny" | | | 4:05 |
| 6. | "Shoot to Kill, Kill Your Darlings" | | | 5:04 |
| 7. | "Horror Movie Soundtrack" | | | 3:52 |
| 8. | "Old Money Bitch" | | | 4:05 |
| 9. | "Geez Louise" (featuring Henhouse!) | Grey; Henson Popa | Grey; Popa | 7:20 |
| 10. | "Seventyseven Dog Years" | | | 4:35 |
| 11. | "Uncanny Long Arms" (featuring Jane Remover) | Grey; Remover | Grey; Remover | 5:26 |
| 12. | "Good Luck Final Girl" | | | 3:28 |
| Total length: | | | | 54:49 |

Wallsocket (Director's Cut) track listing
| No. | Title | Length |
|---|---|---|
| 13. | "My Guy (Corporate Shuffle)" | 3:34 |
| 14. | "Northwest Zombie Girl" | 2:52 |
| 15. | "CCTV" | 8:01 |
| 16. | "Stupid (Can't Run from the Urge)" | 3:04 |
| Total length: | | 72:26 |

Notes

- All track titles are stylized in sentence case.

== Personnel ==
Credits adapted from Underscores' website and the liner notes of Wallsocket.

- April Harper Grey – recording, engineering, mixing, creative direction
- Heba Kadry – mastering
- Raphael Ong – creative direction, graphic and layout design
- Matthew Choi – urban consulting
- Tiam Schaper – architectural design, renders
- Lee Jing Wei – standard album cover render
- Jordan Sullivan – deluxe album cover painting
- Ian Griffin – typography
- Yoffdog – additional typography

== Release history ==
Release dates and format(s) for Wallsocket
| Region | Date | Format(s) | Label | Edition | Ref. |
|---|---|---|---|---|---|
| Various | September 22, 2023 | Streaming; digital download; LP; CD | Mom + Pop; Corporate Rockmusic | Original | |
| Various | June 28, 2024 | Streaming; digital download; LP | Mom + Pop; Corporate Rockmusic | Deluxe | |
