= Do It (Underscores song) =

2025 single by Underscores

Single by Underscores

from the album U
- Released: November 4, 2025
- Genre: Electropop; dance-pop; R&B; hyperpop
- Length: 3:33
- Label: Mom + Pop; Corporate Rockmusic
- Songwriter: April Harper Grey
- Producer: Underscores

Underscores singles chronology
"Copycats" (2025)	"Do It" (2025)	"Do It (Yves Remix)" (2026)

Music video
- "Do It" on YouTube

Remix cover
- Cover of Yves remix

Underscores singles chronology
"Do It" (2025)	"Do It (Yves Remix)" (2026)	"Tabloid Talk" (2026)

Yves singles chronology
"Falling for You" (2025)	"Do It (Yves Remix)" (2026)

Music video
- "Do It (Yves Remix)" on YouTube

"Do It" is a song by the American musician Underscores. It was released as the second single to her third studio album, U (2026), on November 4, 2025, through Mom + Pop and Corporate Rockmusic. Written and produced by Underscores, the song's production combines elements of electropop, dance-pop, R&B, and hyperpop. The track was released alongside its music video, directed by Underscores herself. On January 22, 2026, a remix of the song featuring South Korean singer Yves was released.

== Background ==
On June 27, 2025, "Music" was released as the lead single for U with an accompanying music video. Following its release, Underscores collaborated in two singles: "Booboo2" with Yaeji and Aliyah's Interlude in September and "Copycats" with Danny Brown in October.

== Composition ==
Bringing off an "early-solo Justin Timberlake vibe", "Do It" is an electropop, dance-pop, R&B, and hyperpop song in a runtime of three minutes and thirty-three seconds. Vibrated with chopped-up acoustic guitars, the song is lyrically about negotiating a contract for a romantic relationship. Akin to "Music", "Do It" explores texture and rhythm, showcasing a "four-on-the-floor beat", "percussive guitars", and "britpop-inspired synths" throughout the song.

In the first verse, Underscores questions a potential suitor, as sexual kinks and materialism turn out pointless. Drifting into "dreamy R&B", she proclaims "I just can't do it/I'm married to the music!". Writing and production for "Do It" took place in Chicago, New York City, Los Angeles, and Tokyo. The song was written, produced, recorded, mixed, and mastered solely by Underscores.

== Release ==
On November 4, "Do It" was released by Underscores through Mom + Pop Music and Corporate Rockmusic, with an accompanying music video directed by the musician. In the music video, Underscores sings along to "Do It" while doing Dance Dance Revolution-style choreography with two dancers under flashing lights, as song titles and genre names flash across the screen. Also in the music video, a group of extras get blown away on their chairs from playing the song on their laptop, while scrolling through an online survey based on pigeonholing artists by genre. The cover art was done by Japanese artist Ochiai Shohei.

On January 22, 2026, the remix of "Do It" was released with an accompanying music video featuring South Korean singer and Loona member Yves, who is also credited as its composer and writer. Throughout the remix, the she delivers encouraging lyrics in Korean, including "Don't be afraid" and "Don't hesitate at all."

Following the highly anticipated release of Grand Theft Auto VI, fans discovered that "Do It" was a song that could play on the game's "Stockyard FM" radio station.

== Critical reception ==
Robin Murray of Clash praised the song, describing it as "deliriously infectious". Tom Breihan of Stereogum commented that "Do It" doesn't feel like an "experimental mutation of pop music", but is rather a straightforward variant of it, succeeding on its level. Elijah Pareńo of Rolling Stone Philippines gave insight into both the song and music video, highlighting Underscores' exploration into "performance, irony, and the blurred lines between art and audience."

== Credits and personnel ==
Credits for the original version are taken from Underscores's official website and Tidal. Credits for the Yves remix are taken from Underscores's SoundCloud account and the BMI Repertoire. (Note: Find credits for "Do It (Yves remix)" on the BMI Repertoire by searching the work number #78192340.)

Original version

- Underscores – vocals, songwriting, production
- Ochiai Shohei – cover art

Yves remix

- Underscores – vocals, songwriting, production
- Yves – vocals, songwriting, production
- Ioah (Go Seok-in) (Note: Credited as the misspelled name "Ko Seok In".) – songwriting, production
- Jeung Eun Jeung – songwriting
- Park Ye-chan (Note: Credited as the misspelled name "Park Yechan".) – songwriting
- Ochiai Shohei – cover art
