= Johnny Whoop =

Children's game

Johnny Whoop, also known as Johnny, Johnny, is a children's hand game. One person holds out one of their hands and touches each finger with the index finger from the other hand, going from the pinky to the index finger, then slides the other hand's index finger down between the index finger and the thumb, then touches the thumb, and then repeats the sequence in reverse. As the person touches each finger and the thumb, the person says "Johnny"; as the person slides the finger toward and back from the thumb, they say "Whoop" ("Whoops", "Whoosh" or "Oops"). The result is the sequence "Johnny, Johnny, Johnny, Johnny, Whoop, Johnny, Whoop, Johnny, Johnny, Johnny, Johnny." People in the surrounding group are then challenged to repeat the sequence precisely.

The fun in the game is predicated on some people knowing the trick and some people not knowing it. The person who initiated the game may, for example, fold their hands or cross their arms after completing the sequence, without drawing attention to it or announcing that it is a part of the sequence. The people who don't know the trick may go to frustrating lengths like punching themselves or yelling obscenities trying to tap their fingers "the right way," do the sequence at the "right" speed, or simply just refrain from getting tongue tied from saying "Johnny" over and over again to memorize—when what they really need to do is the simple but unknown trick.

For infants or very young children, the game can be useful for improving coordination without the trick at the end.

The earliest known written reference to the game is from 1966, though it probably predates that considerably.
