= Boneyard AKA Fearmonger =

EP by Underscores
- Released: December 3, 2021
- Genres: Hyperpop; pop-punk
- Length: 18:51
- Label: Self-released
- Producer: Underscores

Underscores chronology
Fishmonger (2021)	Boneyard AKA Fearmonger (2021)	Wallsocket (2023)

Singles from Boneyard AKA Fearmonger
- 1. "Gunk" Released: November 5, 2021; 2. "Everybody's Dead!" Released: November 17, 2021

Boneyard AKA Fearmonger (stylized in all lowercase) is the fifth extended play (EP) by the American musician Underscores, self-released on December 3, 2021. After her debut album Fishmonger garnered attention from high-profile musicians in March 2021, Underscores began working on its companion. She challenged herself to have a firm idea for each song before using a production program and would discard any failed attempts. Boneyard AKA Fearmonger is a hyperpop and pop-punk EP that ranges from acoustic ballads to electronic dance music. The EP's lyrics are introspective and explore existential struggles. The EP was promoted with two singles: "Gunk" and "Everybody's Dead!". The EP received positive reception from publications; The Atlantic and The Fader deemed "Tongue in Cheek" a standout track, and the former considered the EP an improvement over Fishmonger. The EP gained Underscores a larger fanbase.

== Background and production ==
The American musician Underscores released her debut studio album, Fishmonger, in March 2021. It was positively received by The Atlantic and The Line of Best Fit; the former considered it one of the best albums of the year, while the latter considered it one of the best hyperpop albums of all time. It drew the attention of the talent manager Daniel Awad, who said, "It was the only thing I was listening to". He recommended the album to Travis Barker of Blink-182, telling Barker, "I gotta show you something crazy". Barker enjoyed the album; Awad said Barker "just loved it". Similarly, the American musician Brakence was recommended Underscores' 2019 extended play (EP), We Never Got Strawberry Cake, by a friend; he said he was "blown away" and "had never heard anything like it before". Fishmonger also drew the attention of other musicians, such as Lido and Glaive.

After finishing Fishmonger, Underscores did not make music for five months; she experienced a feeling of existential dread and wanted to create music in the apocalyptic setting she felt she was in. She "broke the dry spell" when she created the song "Everybody's Dead!", which appeared on Boneyard AKA Fearmonger, an EP "companion piece" to Fishmonger. Like with Fishmonger, Underscores centered Boneyard AKA Fearmonger around a New Jersey setting. She forced herself to have a firm idea for each song before opening up Ableton Live, a production program. She commented, "If I failed, I would abandon the file and start again". Barker contributed drums to the EP, while Brakence provided additional production.

== Composition ==
Boneyard AKA Fearmonger is a hyperpop and pop-punk EP that blends electronic beats with fuzzy guitars and manipulated vocals. It contains seven tracks that Rolling Stone's Elias Leight described as "often jabbing and visceral". The lyrics in the EP are introspective and deal with themes of "anxiety, existence and generational apathy", according to Ali Shutler of NME. Using keyboards and vulnerable melodies, the songs can range from acoustic ballads to electronic dance music.

The opening track of Boneyard AKA Fearmonger is "Everybody's Dead!", a song described as "nu-new-wave suffering from drum-and-bass jitters" by Leight. It begins and ends with an old recording of the American DJ and producer Skrillex talking, dated to before he made dubstep. Raphael Helfand of The Fader said it "sets the scene for the wild, seven-track ride". "Girls and Boys" is reminiscent of 3OH!3's music, which combines crunk and pop; lyrically, the track reverses the perspective of voyeuristic songs regarding sexual minorities. A loud and fast-paced track, its opening line was called a "memorable snub" by Leight: "My doctor asked me if you were to die for / But you're not even someone I would lie for". Written about the fetishization of trans women by straight men, it represents Underscores' gender identity bolder than it has been represented in the past. "Heck", a downtempo, R&B, and glitch song, is followed by "Gunk", a dubstep song. Leight described the latter as beginning "like an electrical fire" and "downshifting to coffee-house balladry". Gabby Start makes an appearance on "Loansharks", a track aimed to bring dubstep's energy back to pop music. The penultimate track, "Tongue in Cheek", is a song driven by guitars and drums. The track was compared to the music of Jimmy Eat World by The Fader's Jordan Darville; the song was written about a celebrity that Underscores based her "whole personality off of". The track begins with "crystal palace" synthesizers that build into a bombardment of guitars by its middle section. The final track of the EP is "Saltfields (There's Nothing We Can Do!)".

== Release and reception ==
The lead single of Boneyard AKA Fearmonger, "Gunk", was released on November 5, 2021, alongside a music video. It was followed by "Everybody's Dead!" on November 17. The EP was self-released on December 3. A music video for "Everybody's Dead!" premiered on January 26, 2022; it begins with a horror film-esque sequence and ends with a comedic touch due to its bizarre characters. Underscores commented that it "more effectively gets across the feeling" that she attempted to convey in the song. Following its release, the EP received positive reception from publications. Spencer Kornhaber, a writer for The Atlantic, considered it an improvement over Fishmonger. He lauded its "innovative" vocals and considered "Tongue in Cheek" a standout track. Darville thought Underscore embraced a pop-punk influence on the EP more effectively and prominently than is usual for hyperpop artists. He stated that Underscores "never sounds more invigorated than on 'Tongue [in] Cheek'" and called the song "a one-of-kind-mosh pit". Writing about the track "Girls and Boys", Ellie Robinson of The Music called it "one of the best songs ever written about the way trans women are often fetishised by straight men". The EP, alongside Fishmonger, gained Underscores a larger fanbase.

== Track listing ==
All tracks are written and produced by April Harper Grey (Underscores) except where noted. (Note: Find additional credits for "Loansharks" and "Tongue in Cheek" on the BMI Repertoire by searching the work numbers #70395962 and #6390822.)

Boneyard AKA Fearmonger track listing
No.	Title	Writer(s)	Producer(s)	Length
1.	"Everybody's Dead!"			1:52
2.	"Girls and Boys"			3:18
3.	"Heck"			1:58
4.	"Gunk"			2:31
5.	"Loansharks" (featuring Gabby Start)	Grey; Gabriel O'Leary; Randall Findell	Underscores; Brakence^{[a]}	3:14
6.	"Tongue in Cheek"	Grey; Travis Barker		2:36
7.	"Saltfields (There's Nothing We Can Do!)"			3:22
Total length:				18:51

Vinyl release
No.	Title	Writer(s)	Length
8.	"Hella Good" (No Doubt cover)	Grey; Gwen Stefani; Pharrell Williams; Chad Hugo; Tony Kanal	3:47
Total length:			22:38

Notes

- ^a signifies an additional producer
- The SoundCloud and Bandcamp versions of the EP feature longer song titles; the titles shown in this article are used elsewhere.

== Personnel ==
- Underscores – songwriting, production
- Gabby Start – songwriting (5)
- Brakence – songwriting, additional production (5)
- Travis Barker – songwriting, drums (6)
