= Character Development! =

EP by Underscores
- Released: January 15, 2020
- Recorded: 2019
- Length: 9:46
- Label: Bitbird
- Producer: Underscores

Underscores chronology
We Never Got Strawberry Cake (2019)	Character Development! (2020)	Fishmonger (2021)

Character Development! (stylized in all lowercase) is the fourth extended play (EP) by the American musician Underscores. It was released on January 15, 2020, through Bitbird. The EP marked a change in sound from Underscores's previous work, featuring more simple production and less vocal effects. She wrote it in contrast to her EP Skin Purifying Treatment (2018), carrying over its themes of emotional turmoil despite being in a better mental state, with this being the main inspiration for the outro track. Character Development! received positive reviews from music critics, who often praised its production.

== Background and release ==
Underscores first signed to independent record label Bitbird in 2018, debuting on the label with the single "About the Kid That Never Left the House" that same year. The song acted as a sequel to her previous self-released single "About the Kid That Ran Away", which released that same year. She went back to self-releasing music for the 3-track extended play (EP) We Never Got Strawberry Cake in 2019, but later returned to the label.

Underscores recorded Character Development! while in a better mental state than her previous "main project", Skin Purifying Treatment (2018), leading her to question if she should still write from a place of "emotional struggle" when not experiencing it while writing the track "Pay Attention!". The song itself was originally made as an assignment for her music class at New York University. Character Development! was released through Bitbird on January 15, 2020, with visualizers for all three tracks and a music video for "Pay Attention!" (directed by Underscores and Garrison Ho) releasing the same day. The video features graphic overlays and washed out pastel colors and plays off the song's lyrics.

== Music and themes ==
Musically, Character Development! marked a slight departure from the rest of Underscores's work at the time, as it had comparatively simpler production and less vocal processing. Alessandra Rincon of Ones to Watch stated that it showcased the increased creative growth of Underscores from 2019 to 2020, also citing its production choices. The EP opens with "Clean!", a sparse track featuring pitched vocals and synthesizers. The song transitions into a slower, more somber tone during its outro. "Pay Attention!" is a bittersweet track with acoustic guitar riffs, drum lines, and a synth arpeggio that repeats every eight bars, with Rincon comparing its sound to the rock band MGMT. Underscores sings in a light yet lethargic voice backed by harmonies, jumping between topics with little to no connection between one another in the lyrics.

== Critical reception ==
Character Development! received positive reviews from music critics. Canary Autumn of Ringtone praised the EP as "a very satisfying, wholesome, and maybe even a healing listen." They included "Pay Attention!" on the magazine's list of the best songs of 2020, praising the song's "clean" and "warm" sound while finding happiness in how Underscores fit "this sort of empty-headed, manic-depressive feeling into a song like this." Rincon complimented "Clean!" for its "satisfyingly peppy quality" and transition between sections, also lauding "Pay Attention!" for staying authentic to Underscores's sound despite its added flare.

== Track listing ==
All tracks are written, produced, and mixed by Underscores (April Harper Grey).

No.	Title	Length
1.	"Clean!"	3:05
2.	"Telephone Line 415"	2:46
3.	"Pay Attention!"	3:55
Total length:		9:46

Notes

- "Clean!" and "Pay Attention!" are stylized in all lowercase.
- "Telephone Line 415" is stylized in all caps.
