= Music (Underscores song) =

Single by Underscores

from the album U
- Released: June 27, 2025
- Genre: EDM; hyperpop; dubstep
- Length: 3:27
- Label: Mom + Pop; Corporate Rockmusic
- Songwriter: April Harper Grey
- Producer: Underscores

Underscores singles chronology
| "Poplife" (2025) | "Music" (2025) | "Booboo2" (2025) |

Music video
- Music on YouTube

"Music" is a song by the American musician Underscores. It was released as the lead single to her third studio album, U, on June 27, 2025, through Mom + Pop and Corporate Rockmusic. Written and produced by Underscores, the song's production combines elements of EDM, hyperpop, dubstep, and pop-punk, with its lyrics detailing a romantic relationship through music-related terms. The track was released alongside its music video, directed by Underscores herself. "Music" received positive reviews from music critics, who praised its production style and lyrics. A stepchart and a lyric video for the song were subsequently released in July 2025. The song was nominated for Best Dance/Electronic Recording at the 69th Annual Grammy Awards.

== Background and recording ==
While talking to Travis Mills on his eponymous Apple Music 1 show, Underscores stated that she had the most fun writing "Music" out of any song on U. She produced the instrumental while on tour with Porter Robinson in Oslo, Copenhagen, Amsterdam, Cologne, and Glasgow, feeling inspired by everything around her, and later recorded the vocals after returning home to Chicago. Traveling between cities with Robinson shaped her approach to writing and recording with a simpler and more convenient recording setup, "reverting" to using a Focusrite Scarlett interface and a SM7B microphone as they could fit in her backpack. The final track was mixed by Underscores while Heba Kadry served as its mastering engineer.

Underscores debuted "Music" live during her performance at Coachella 2025 on April 12, 2025. She went on to preview it at several other live shows afterwards. On June 25, Underscores teased the song's music video on X, which she followed with an announcement that the song would be releasing that Friday. On the night before its release, she performed the song at Pitchfork & Them Present: Night Out, hosted at Knockdown Center.

== Composition ==
"Music" is an EDM track featuring combinations of hyperpop, dubstep, and pop-punk with a runtime of three minutes and twenty-seven seconds Underscores described it as a return to the "dubstep, kind of future bass" music she made as a child. The song serves as a "loose homage" to the track of the same name by Madonna, who became Underscores's "first favourite artist" when she was around 5 years old. In its lyrics, Underscores uses music-themed imagery as a metaphor for being in love.

== Release and reception ==
"Music" was released as the lead single for U on June 27, 2025, via Mom + Pop and Corporate Rockmusic. Alongside its release, Underscores uploaded its accompanying music video to YouTube. Ochiai Shohei, who designed the single's cover art, posted various early sketches to his Twitter account. On July 5, Underscores shared the song's lyric video, coinciding with its official stepchart being made available for download.

Upon its release, "Music" received positive reviews from music critics. In a track review for Pitchfork, Kieran Press-Reynolds called the song's composition "endearingly askew, littered with little tonal jumps and ornate glitches. Grey turns abrasive percussion and 8-bit gurgles into the raw ingredients of desire." They reflected that Underscores's pre-release performance at Knockdown Center made it "clear that she's forever the kid who grew up tinkering on SoundCloud and worshipping Skrillex", similarly stating that the song is made "for the people nursed on Monstercat, for collectors of Skullcandy headphones, for whom love in 2025 feels like a Syzy-ian EDM-trap eruption of noise." Rolling Stone Philippines characterized its attitude as "bratty and sincere, like the internet built it from scratch and left no manual behind." Writing for KCRW's website, Stella Merims described the lyrics of "Music" as "both heartfelt and witty," lauding it as "the kind of song you notice something new about with every listen."

== Accolades ==
| Year | Award | Category | Result | Ref. |
|---|---|---|---|---|
| 2027 | 69th Annual Grammy Awards | Best Dance/Electronic Recording | Pending | |

== Credits and personnel ==
Credits adapted from Underscores's official website and Tidal.

- Underscores – vocals, songwriting, production
- Heba Kadry – mastering engineer
- Ochiai Shohei – cover art
