= Fishmonger (album) =

2021 studio album by Underscores

Studio album by Underscores
- Released: March 25, 2021
- Genre: Hyperpop
- Length: 33:41
- Label: Self-released
- Producer: Underscores

Underscores chronology
Character Development! (2020)	Fishmonger (2021)	Boneyard AKA Fearmonger (2021)

Singles from Fishmonger
- 1. "Second Hand Embarrassment" Released: February 2, 2021; 2. "Kinko's Field Trip 2006" Released: March 2, 2021

Fishmonger is the debut studio album by the American musician Underscores, self-released on March 25, 2021. Running out of ideas for production techniques, Underscores challenged herself to play the guitar on every song of the album as she had little experience with the instrument. She recorded Fishmonger in her parents' house during the COVID-19 pandemic.

Critics identified Fishmonger as a hyperpop album that incorporates various genre influences into its soundscape. The album is characterized by glitchy production, distorted guitars, and pitched-up vocals, discussing celebrity culture in its lyrics. Underscores designed Fishmonger as being based around a coastal New Jersey town. The album was promoted by two singles—"Second Hand Embarrassment" and "Kinko's Field Trip 2006"—and the album's artwork was photographed in Longport, New Jersey.

Fishmonger garnered positive reception from music publications; The Atlantic considered it one of the best albums of 2021, while The Line of Best Fit deemed it one of the best hyperpop albums of all time. It also was received positively by high-profile musicians; the album allowed Underscores to tour with Glaive and Ericdoa and book studio sessions with 100 gecs and Travis Barker. Fishmonger received a companion extended play (EP), Boneyard AKA Fearmonger, in December 2021, and the Fishmonger era concluded with the single "Count of Three (You Can Eat $#@!)" in January 2023.

== Background and production ==
Underscores began releasing music online at age 13. She originally created dubstep and electronic dance music but became bored of "using the same sounds", leading her to incorporate other influences. In 2015, she released her debut single, "Mild Season", which was followed by her debut extended play (EP), Air Freshener, the next year. While Air Freshener was mainly instrumental, her second EP, 2018's Skin Purifying Treatment, incorporated lyrics and influences from jazz music. She released two more EPs: We Never Got Strawberry Cake in 2019, and Character Development! in 2020.

On Fishmonger, her debut album, Underscores forced herself to play the guitar on every song; before making the album, she had little experience with the instrument. This was due to her running out of production techniques at the time and being dissatisfied with the voicings she played on the keyboard. Fishmonger was created in her parents' house during the COVID-19 pandemic. Underscores described her experience of contacting 8485 to appear on Fishmonger as difficult because she highly respected 8485 and "thought she was a larger than life person".

== Composition ==
=== Overview ===
Fishmonger is a hyperpop album characterized by glitchy production, distorted guitars, and pitched-up vocals. Lyrically, the album explores themes of celebrity culture and more personal topics than Underscores' previous releases. An album with unpredictable song structures, Fishmonger is based around a coastal New Jersey town. The Fader's David Renshaw felt it contained influences of pop-punk and electronic music and was "branded as hyperpop", while Colin Joyce of the same magazine called it an "album full of digi-punk contortions". Matthew Kim from The Line of Best Fit said the album "cycled through hyperpop, garage punk, emo rap, dubstep and psychedelic ambience like it was nothing". For the same magazine, Noah Simon described the album as "an indie-pop-rock-punk-hyperpop bonanza". Natalie Marlin of Paste called it "a hyperactive blend of hyperpop, dubstep, and speaker-blowing digitized rock". NPR's Reanna Cruz said the album is "equally digicore as it is emo" and draws from SoundCloud rap and the music from Spotify's "Lorem" playlist. They said this blend of genres results "in a delightful blend of emotional sincerity and distorted chaos".

=== Songs ===
The opening track of Fishmonger is "70%", a garage rock and surf rock track driven by lap steel guitar. Simon described Underscores' performance on the track as "erratic" and "screeching". It is followed by "Second Hand Embarrassment", an indie pop track that combines whispered vocals and an electronic instrumental with "bubbly" 808 drums. "Bozo Bozo Bozo" contains a pop and R&B instrumental that "then caves in on itself". Joyce described the instrumental "as if the Darkchild discography you once downloaded from LimeWire had started to corrupt and corrode over time". The track is lyrically self-critical; Underscores apologizes for "oversharing to the friends [she] made by lying on the internet" in one of its lines. An alt-rock track, "Kinko's Field Trip 2006" contains pitched-up vocals over an energetic chorus and distorted guitars.

"Where Did You Fall" is a UK garage-inspired track reminiscent of the English singer PinkPantheress. It starts with acoustic guitars and fretful lyricism; it has a standard pop-punk song structure that delves into an electronic downtempo beat. "Spoiled Little Brat" is a pop-punk track with a line stating, "I'm a popstar baby". Simon described it as a "supremely catchy tune" and highlighted its frantic and sputtering breakdown with "raucous guitar riffs". "Your Favorite Sidekick", a track about recognizing a growing bond with somebody, contains a guest appearance from 8485. On the track, a voice expresses, "It's the new wave of the future!". "Dry Land 2001" contains a guest appearance from Gabby Start, at the time credited as Knapsack. It begins as an electropop song that loses its momentum, incorporating guitars that create an atmospheric fusion of dream pop and shoegaze. The album's penultimate track is "The Fish Song". Fishmonger concludes with the Maxwell Young-assisted "Del Mar County Fair 2008".

== Release and legacy ==
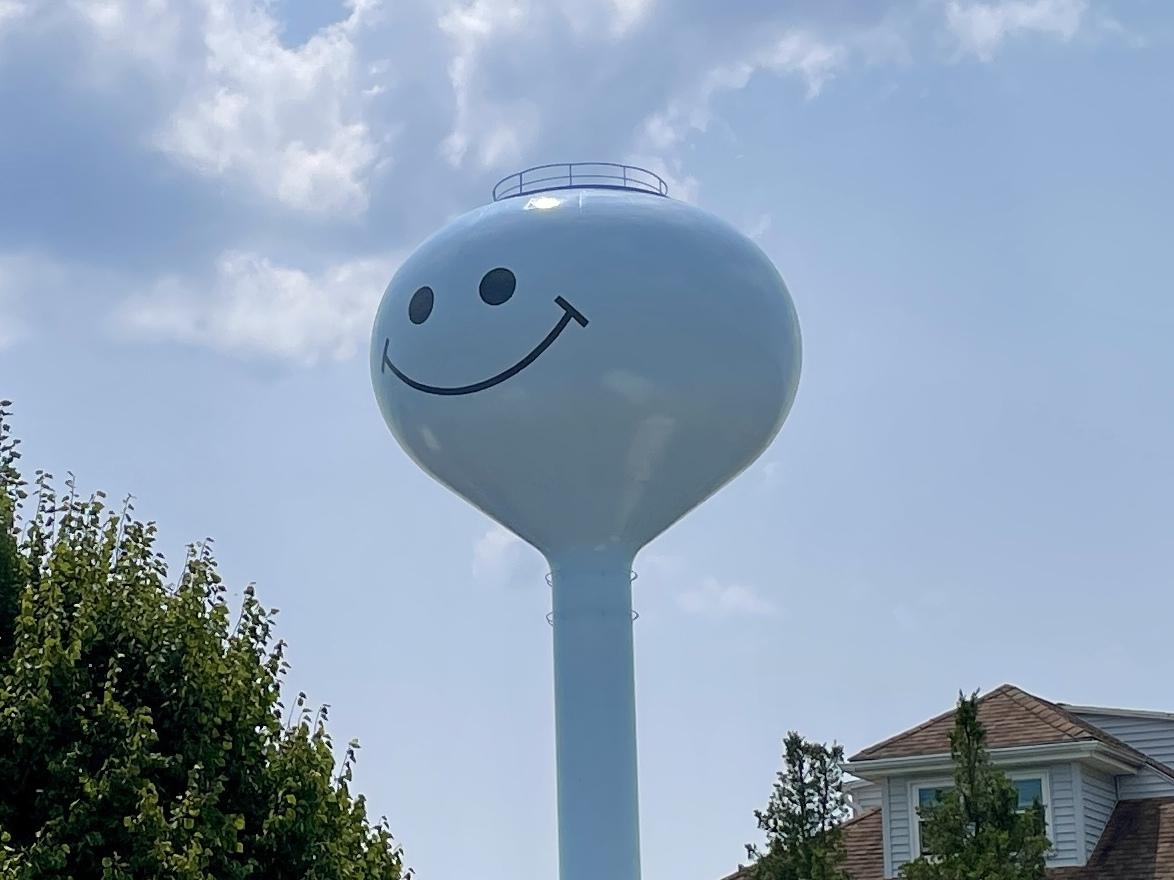
The water tower featured in Fishmonger's cover artwork (pictured) is located in Longport, New Jersey.

Fishmonger's lead single, "Second Hand Embarrassment", was released on February 2, 2021. It was accompanied by a music video assisted by Ayodeji that was filmed at a motel in Longport, New Jersey. The staff at the motel thought they were filming a pornographic film; after the production crew attempted to shoot a scene on the motel's balcony, the receptionist called the police. Underscores considers the music video her favorite project she has worked on with Ayodeji; Ayodeji said it "felt extremely surreal the whole time [they] were filming". The single was followed by "Kinko's Field Trip 2006" on March 2; Fishmonger was self-released on March 25. Its cover artwork showcases an image of a water tower located in Longport.

Following the release of Fishmonger, Underscores gained a larger audience and attracted the attention of high-profile musicians. The Norwegian musician and record producer Lido found affinity with the album and sent it to his manager, Jackson Perry, who then sent it to his coworker, Dorothy Caccavale. Lido said "[Underscores has] this insane production style. I need to meet this kid". The album also drew the attention of the talent manager Daniel Awad, who said it was the only album he was listening to at the time. He recommended the album to Travis Barker of Blink-182, telling Barker, "I gotta show you something crazy". Barker enjoyed the album; Awad said Barker "just loved it". The American musician Glaive at first thought the album was "a little too much for [his] brain", but later returned to the album and enjoyed it. The positive reception left Underscores "paralyzed" and she did not create music for five months after Fishmonger's release: Underscores stated, "I didn't know what to do."

Due to the success of Fishmonger, Underscores was able to tour with Glaive and Ericdoa and be invited to studio sessions with 100 gecs and Barker. On December 3, 2021, Fishmonger was followed by an EP titled Boneyard AKA Fearmonger, which served as its "companion piece". Barker contributed drums to the EP and like Fishmonger, it was centered around a coastal New Jersey setting. Underscores released a song titled "Count of Three (You Can Eat $#@!)" on January 20, 2023, which she dubbed "the last piece of the Fishmonger era". Renshaw called it the start of her next chapter. The song "Uncanny Long Arms" from her next album, Wallsocket (2023), adapts the power pop guitar climax of "Kinko's Field Trip 2006".

== Critical reception ==
Professional ratings
Review scores
Source	Rating
laut.de	4/5 stars

Fishmonger garnered positive reviews from music publications. In a review of the album for the German online magazine laut.de, Yannik Gölz said the album "becomes so ironic that it ends up being serious" (Note: This quote is a translation of the original text: "wird so ironisch, dass es am Ende in der Ernsthaftigkeit landet") and sounds like the "pop-punk cousin" of 100 gecs. He lauded the album's choruses and called "Second Hand Embarrassment" and "Bozo Bozo Bozo" "phenomenal pop songs". (Note: This quote is a translation of the original text: "einfach für phänomenale Popsongs halten") He further felt, "Maybe Fishmonger isn't the next big album in the hyperpop scene", (Note: This quote is a translation of the original text: "Vielleicht ist "Fishmonger" nicht das nächste große Album der Hyperpop-Szene") and thought it could attain a cult following instead. Retrospectively, Kim said the album proved to show "Underscores has a remarkable ability to search out a good melody".

The Atlantic ranked Fishmonger fifth on their list of the best albums of 2021; Spencer Kornhaber said the album is "anchored by tidy hooks and an emo heart" and succeeds at "creating songs that first seem like a joke, but that don't get old". He further expressed that the album "sounds like an expertly produced band with a record deal" and not an independent musician making music in their parents' house. The Fader considered "Bozo Bozo Bozo" the 25th best song of the year; Joyce called it a "shut-in's prayer" and "a suggestion that peace is possible, even for the most terminally online". The same magazine also included "Spoiled Little Brat" in their list of "The best rock songs right now" in May 2021; Renshaw considered it a standout from the album and said it "contextualises [Underscores] a little better". NPR deemed "Your Favorite Sidekick" one of the best electronic songs of 2021; Cruz called it the album's "catchiest track". In October 2021, the staff at laut.de ranked "Dry Land 2001" as the fifth greatest hyperpop song of all time; their writer called it Underscores' magnum opus.

The Line of Best Fit deemed Fishmonger the 13th best hyperpop album of all time in 2022. Simon highlighted Underscores' "distinct melodic and lyrical style" and its combination with multiple sounds. He felt that "not much sounds like [Fishmonger]" and praised the album for "contain[ing] some of the best use of guitar rock influences" in the hyperpop scene. He concluded by describing Fishmonger as "fun, accessible, detailed, and impeccably written" with the ability to mix hyperpop with unexpected genres and sounds. Vice included the album in their list of "16 Essential Albums You May Have Missed in 2021". Emma Garland complimented the album's songs for mixing fast and messy sounds into catchy songs "that bristle with a sense of youthful excitement and impatience". She concluded by calling the album "smart, inventive songwriting from the cutting edge of pop music". Elias Light for Rolling Stone deemed "Where Did You Fall" a standout track and described "Your Favorite Sidekick" as "shattering".

== Track listing ==
All tracks are written and produced by Underscores (April Harper Grey) except where noted. (Note: Find additional credits for "Loansharks" on the BMI Repertoire by searching the work numbers #70395962. Find additional credits for "Tongue in Cheek" and "Tongue in Cheek (Lunice version)" by searching the work numbers #63908221 and #56386855.)

Fishmonger track listing
No.	Title	Writer(s)	Producer(s)	Length
1.	"70%"			2:40
2.	"Second Hand Embarrassment"			2:17
3.	"Bozo Bozo Bozo"			2:38
4.	"Kinko's Field Trip 2006"			2:31
5.	"Where Did You Fall"			3:31
6.	"Spoiled Little Brat"			3:19
7.	"Your Favorite Sidekick" (featuring 8485)	Grey; 8485		2:30
8.	"Dry Land 2001" (featuring Knapsack)	Grey; Gabriel O'Leary	Underscores; Gabby Start^{[a]}	7:02
9.	"The Fish Song"			2:42
10.	"Del Mar County Fair 2008" (with Maxwell Young)	Grey; Maxwell Young		4:31
Total length:				33:41

Fishmonger (DeadAir Legacy Edition) track listing
No.	Title	Writer(s)	Producer(s)	Length
11.	"Everybody's Dead!"			1:52
12.	"Girls and Boys"			3:18
13.	"Heck"			1:58
14.	"Gunk"			2:31
15.	"Loansharks" (featuring Gabby Start)	Grey; O'Leary; Randall Findell	Underscores; Brakence	3:14
16.	"Tongue in Cheek"	Grey; Travis Barker		2:36
17.	"Saltfields (There's Nothing We Can Do!)"			3:22
18.	"Bozo Bozo Bozo" (Carolesdaughter version)	Grey; Gabe Greenland; Thea Taylor		2:38
19.	"Spoiled Little Brat" (Six Impala version)		Six Impala	2:38
20.	"Tongue in Cheek" (Lunice version)	Grey; Barker; Lunice Fermin Pierre II	Lunice	3:24
21.	"Everybody's Dead!" (Virtual Riot version)		Virtual Riot	3:30
22.	"Your Favorite Sidekick" (Virtual Riot version)		Virtual Riot	2:57
23.	"Ur Not Really 'Bout It" (bonus track)		Underscores; Umru	2:58
24.	"Stick the Landing" (bonus track)			2:58
Total length:				73:35

Notes

- All track titles are stylized in sentence case.
- ^a signifies an additional producer

== Personnel ==
Credits adapted from Tidal, Underscores' website, and the liner notes of Fishmonger.

- Underscores – vocals, songwriting, production
- 8485 – vocals (7)
- Gabby Start – vocals (8, 15), additional production (8)
- Ayodeji – visuals
- Elena Fortune – gatefold design
- Brakence – additional production (15)
- Travis Barker – drums (16)
- Carolesdaughter – vocals (18)

== Release history ==
Release dates and format(s) for Fishmonger
Region	Date	Format(s)	Label	Edition	Ref.
Worldwide	March 25, 2021	Streaming; digital download	Self-released	Standard	
Worldwide	April 2022	LP	Self-released	Standard	
United States	October 1, 2023	LP	Self-released	Standard	
United States	February 2025	LP; CD	DeadAir	Legacy	
