= Backstage Hologram =

Studio album by Kuru
- Released: April 17, 2026
- Recorded: 2025–2026
- Genres: Trap; electronic trap; rage; digicore
- Length: 39:17
- Label: DeadAir
- Producers: 444jet; Bhertuy; carbine; Jayysoul; Kuru; Maneru; MISOGI; Moa; pitchweavr; popilization; ppayn33; san; sean baby; ssongbirds; Syzy; tahu2x; violet; waera

Kuru chronology
Stay True Forever (2025)	Backstage Hologram (2026)

Singles from Backstage Hologram
- 1. "FW19" Released: March 20, 2026; 2. "Noir Kei" Released: April 8, 2026

Backstage Hologram (stylized in sentence case) is the second studio album by American rapper Kuru, released on April 17, 2026 through DeadAir Records. The album features 15 tracks with three features from katmoji, Lucy Bedroque and Xaviersobased. The album's lead single, "FW19," was released on March 20, 2026.

Upon release, Backstage Hologram has been issued on CD and vinyl.

== Background ==
In November 2024, Kuru released their (Note: Kuru is non-binary, this article uses they/them/their for consistency) debut studio album, titled re:wired, upon release, the album performed very well online among fans and media critics. Then, in May 2025, Kuru released their debut studio mixtape titled Stay True Forever. The mixtape generally received a positive reception amongst media critics and fans as well. Four months after, Kuru confirmed the project and began teasing Backstage Hologram in October 2025. In April 2026, Kuru announced the feature list, as well as a tour for the album, which began on April 18 in Seattle and concluded on May 14 in Toronto.

== Composition ==
=== Overview ===
Backstage Hologram is a 15 track album, it combines elements of Japanese pop and DMV hip-hop. A reviewer for Pitchfork labeled the project as a playful one, the project sees Kuru experiment more with layered "polyphony" sounds, and 8-bit-inspired production while staying true to their roots on their tracks with Xavier and Lucy. Julian Telles of The Daily of the University of Washington wrote how Backstage Hologram was Kuru's most polished work as of yet, praising the music production with the use of "roomy atmospheric pads, muted snares, punchy 808s and light, skittering hi-hats." Telles writes how the album sees Kuru still stick to their "established rap-sing and mumble flow."

Jude Noel of Pitchfork wrote how the project ties into the contemporaries of artists such as Nettspend and Prettifun due to its "punchier low end and brattier energy," which resembles the "moshpit-ready rage rap." Despite being vocally monotone, Noel praises the "gorgeous digital keyboard parts" that remind listeners of the crusty, low-resolution soundtracks of Nintendo DS-era RPGs like Pokemon Diamond & Pearl. Overall, Noel praised the project, writing how lean polished it is, and how it goes to show just how comfortable Kuru has gotten with their uniquely creative voice.

=== Songs ===
The Fader's Vivian Medithi stated the album drew influences from jerk rap, J-Pop and DMV hip-hop. The reviewer from Pitchfork wrote how "Noir Kei" conjures "dextrous blip-and-vocal orchestra." Telles' wrote how the lead single "FW19" is clean, crisp, and sonically pleasing. On "Gracious", Telles writes how Kuru's vocals sit atop the beat, which sees their vocals "glide along the melody". "Pray For..." sees Kura's vocals as a secondary option, while the beat weaves in above and below his vocals. Both "Gracious" and "Pray For..." feature "rhythmically unsettling arpeggiating pianos, glued together and given a groove by a steady, bumping 808 pulse." On "End of Spring", Kuru unites with Lucy Bedroque where Telles writes how their verse is "catchy, melodic, and falsetto, providing the tracklist with vocal variety." On "U Wld Never Do It", Kuru humorously raps about Italian brainrot while feeling "too old" with their lyrics saying “too old for the Discord, I feel like a fossil,” the track is less melodic but has similarities to Lil Uzi Vert's Eternal Atake.

On "Pray For...", it features an eerie chord that arpeggiates wildly across fractured drum patterns; however, lyrically, it's very stable and in orbit. Lyrically, Kuru flexes the lifestyle they live while making cultural references to a Roku TV and to Madoka Magica characters Homura and Madoka. Throughout the project, Kuru experiments sonically with different sounds, the track "Like Glue" sees Kuru venture into J-Pop, while "Three Worlds Apart" dives more into breakbeat, which shows the evidence of greater thoughtfulness underlying Kuru’s impressive production chops.

== Critical reception ==
Professional ratings
Review scores
Source	Rating
Pitchfork	7.3/10

Telles overall gave the album good praise, writing how it's a new breath of fresh air, and how the project sees Kuru breaks the trend of strict rage rap releases, such as Nettspend's Early Life Crisis and Che's Rest in Bass, it help clears space in the cloud of bass noise for his polished, fresh sound. Telles ends the review by noting that Kuru is evolving their sound and claims he does so not by getting louder, but by pulling back. Jude Noel of Pitchfork rated the album a 7.3 out of 10, highlighting the polished production and unique, creative voice of Kuru.

== Track listing ==
All lyrics are written by Keegan Foley

No.	Title	Producer(s)	Length
1.	"I Can Live W That"	Ssongbirds; Popilization; Moa	2:38
2.	"U Wld Never Do It"	Kuru	2:35
3.	"Gracious"	Waera	2:15
4.	"Don't Get Stuck"	Misogi	2:19
5.	"End of Spring" (featuring Lucy Bedroque)	Jayysoul	2:52
6.	"Noir Kei"	Sean Baby	2:46
7.	"Pray For..."	Popilization; San	1:52
8.	"Good Game"	pitchweavr	2:25
9.	"Like Glue" (featuring Katmoji)	Kuru	2:23
10.	"Glass" (featuring Xaviersobased)	444Jet	3:02
11.	"Let the Keys Cry"	Kuru; Ppayn33; Tahu2x	1:40
12.	"FW19"	Bhertuy	2:11
13.	"Tofu"	Carbine; Kuru	2:21
14.	"Shibuya Transfer"	Kuru; Violet	2:41
15.	"Three Worlds Apart"	Syzy	4:12
Total length:			39:17

=== Notes ===
- All tracks are stylized in sentence case.

== Release history ==
Release dates and formats for Backstage Hologram
Region	Date	Format(s)	Edition	Label	Ref.
Worldwide	April 17, 2026	LP; CD; digital download; streaming	Standard	DeadAir Records	

== See also ==
- 2026 in hip-hop
