= Pressure (Yungster Jack and David Shawty song) =

2020 song by Yungster Jack and David Shawty

Single by Yungster Jack and David Shawty
- Released: January 31, 2020
- Recorded: 2020
- Genre: Digicore; glitchcore
- Length: 1:52
- Label: Self-released
- Songwriters: Yungster Jack; David Shawty
- Producer: Hoodwtch

Music video
- "Pressure" on YouTube

"Pressure" is a digicore song by Yungster Jack and David Shawty released on January 31, 2020. The song went viral on TikTok, YouTube and Spotify in 2020, inspiring various glitchcore edits by TikTok video editors such as iguana_alana who initially helped garner the track wider recognition on the platform.

== Background and composition ==
"Pressure" is a song by Yungster Jack and David Shawty. The song showcases Shawty's style which according to Underground Underdogs involves "wild autotune and vocal manipulation, as well as frantic and fast-paced production" inspired by the hyperpop genre. Writing for Pitchfork, music journalist Alphonse Pierre compared the track to Chief Keef's 2015 song "War" and the work of Bladee, Goth Money Records, Metro Zu and Playboi Carti. Writing for Complex, Press-Reynolds stated that the song had "invaded mainstream TikTok and racked up big numbers on YouTube and Spotify too."

According to Ones to Watch, the song is "loud and abrasive with stuttering vocals and a rushing instrumental that blended both electronic and hip hop". The track was also described as "glitchy" and an example of the "glitchcore" genre. According to Kieran Press-Reynolds of Pitchfork, he wrote how the track features stutters throughout the track, which helps serves as the track's bedrock foundation.

== Critical reception ==
Pitchfork described the single as an "underground hit", which was brought to attention on TikTok by the glitchcore editor "iguana_alana".
