= Kuru (musician) =

Musical artist (born 2005)

Kuru (Note: stylized in lowercase)
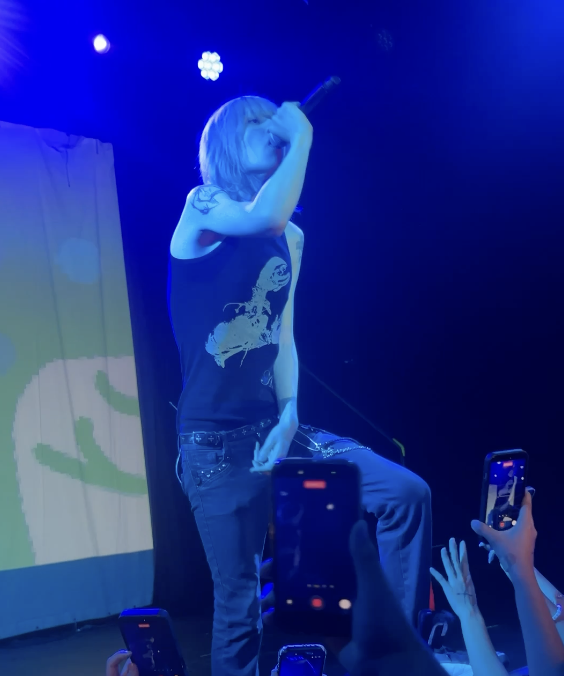
- Kuru performing at Music Hall of Williamsburg in 2026

Background information
- Also known as: Kuru8k, Lil’ Ku, Keeg
- Born: Keegan Foley; November 14, 2005 (age 21); Rockville, Maryland, U.S.
- Genres: Digicore; hyperpop
- Occupations: Singer; songwriter; rapper; record producer
- Years active: 2020–present
- Label: DeadAir
- Member of: Helix Tears, Graveem1nd, TooManyStrikers
- Formerly of: Novagang

Keegan Foley (born November 14, 2005), known professionally as Kuru (stylized in lowercase), is an American rapper and record producer from Rockville, Maryland, U.S. They are a member of the DMV rap collective TooManyStrikers, and digicore collectives Helix Tears and graveem1nd, and formerly of Novagang. In 2024, Kuru released their debut studio album Re:Wired, followed by the mixtape Stay True Forever in 2025 and their second studio album Backstage Hologram in 2026.

== Early life ==
Keegan Foley was born on November 14, 2005, in Rockville, Maryland, United States. Growing up, they described their life as "weird". At 14, Foley first began recording and producing music during the COVID-19 pandemic after they heard a Demxntia song, and were mesmerized by it, due to how they were able to make music from their room. After generating traction through SoundCloud, they began to take their work more seriously.

== Career ==
Foley is a member of the internet rap, digicore, and hyperpop scenes in hip-hop. On December 3, 2021, Foley, alongside xaviersobased and other artists, were featured on Dazegxd's track Paterson New Jersey. They released their debut studio album, re:wired with DeadAir Records, which featured production credits from fellow digicore artists, such as twikipedia, Jane Remover, and sydney runner.

According to Kieran Press-Reynolds of Pitchfork the project sees Foley embrace what it means to be a "digicore producer". On May 23, 2025, Foley released their first mixtape, titled Stay True Forever. According to Solomon Pace-McCarrick of Dazed, the mixtape sees Foley being a rapper of "profound significance" at the center of a "new wave of digital rap music". In March 2026, Foley announced a tour with labelmate Lucy Bedroque and 9lives.

On April 17, 2026, their second studio album, Backstage Hologram, released, with features from Lucy Bedroque, Katmoji, and xaviersobased. A reviewer for Pitchfork labeled the project as a "playful one", going on to say the project sees Foley experiment more with layered "polyphony" sounds. It features 8-bit-inspired production, while staying true to "their roots" on tracks with fellow rappers xaviersobased and Lucy Bedroque.

== Musical style and artistry ==
Foley is a member of the DMV rap scene. According to Foley, their vocal inspirations come from their closest friends, namely d0llywood1, Blackwinterwells, and 4am. They also took inspiration from their fellow artists in collectives NOVAGANG and bloodhounds. Additionally, they cite Typo, a fusion of UK drill and Europop sounds as a personal favorite. Kuru is also close friends with rapper Angelus, and Jackzebra, whom they have performed with along with other close friend rappers at the University of California Los Angeles chapter of the Sigma Pi fraternity.

== Personal life ==
As of 2026, Kuru resides in Queens, New York. In 2020, Kuru temporarily lived in New Jersey, according to a 2025 livestream.

== Discography ==
=== Studio albums ===
Title	Album details
Re:Wired	Released: November 8, 2024; Label: DeadAir; Format: CD, digital download, streaming
Backstage Hologram	Released: April 17, 2026; Label: DeadAir; Format: LP, CD, digital download, streaming

=== Mixtapes ===
Title	Album details
Stay True Forever	Released: May 23, 2025; Label: DeadAir; Format: CD, digital download, streaming

=== EPs ===
Title	EP details
Splitting Time	Released: February 18, 2022; Label: Cascine; Format: Digital download, streaming
