= Johnnascus =

- Thompson in 2026.

Background information
- Also known as: Westside Johnny
- Born: Johnny Thompson; June 23, 1999 (age 27); Houston, Texas, US
- Genres: Experimental rap, Digital Hardcore, Digicore, Trap metal
- Instruments: Vocals, synthesizer, sampler, guitar
- Years active: 2014-2023 (Note: Announced an indefinite hiatus in September 2023 via Instagram), 2025-present (solo artist)
- Member of: CPU Buddha (2023-present)
- Formerly of: Spider Gang, PLACEHOLDEN, MAKE FAMILY NOT FRIENDS
- Website: untitled.xn--q9jyb4c

Johnny Thompson, better known by his stage name Johnnascus (stylized in all caps), is an American vocalist, songwriter, and producer based in Houston, Texas, formerly affiliated with rapper Lil Darkie's music collective Spider Gang. Thompson currently serves as the vocalist and producer of the digital hardcore band CPU Buddha, along with keyboardist Kei Sprague and drummer Jack Riggs, the latter of whom providing live drumming for Thompson's solo work.

Thompson has collaborated with the likes of Danny Brown, 8485, and Lil Darkie, as well as being a supporting live act for Machine Girl and LustSickPuppy.

== Style ==
Thompson's musical style has been described as industrial, experimental, and abrasive, most notably featuring Thompson's screaming, metal-style vocals. Thompson also incorporates topics such as transhumanism, religion, and the internet into his lyrics. Thompson has also incorporated Japanese culture into his work, most notably on his 2020 concept album (untitled_0007-0020&0001)), which takes inspiration from the 1998 anime Serial Experiments Lain.

== Discography ==
=== Studio Albums ===
Title	Album details
Luna	Released April 9, 2016; Label: Self-released
Out of Place as the Moon in the Sky	Released January 31, 2018; Label: Self-released
Departure	Released April 28, 2018; Label: Self-released
Plague Cross	Released October 13, 2018; Label: Self-released
Identity Crisis	Released February 16, 2019; Label: Self-released
(untitled_0007-0020&0001))	Released August 15, 2020; Label: Self-released
Sitting at the End of the World	Released August 16, 2022; Label: Self-released

=== Extended Plays ===
Title	EP details
Noccanist Equinox	Released April 21, 2015; Label: Self-released
Love, a Broken Dream	Released May 22, 2016; Label: Self-released
No Theme	Released March 13, 2017; Label: Self-released
Errquu	Released November 9, 2019; Label: Self-released

=== Mixtapes ===
Title	Album details
Clouds	Released December 12, 2014; Label: Self-released
The Training	Released August 20, 2016; Label: Self-released
