= 8485 =

Canadian singer and producer

- Also known as: Cat Trevingt; Eighty; Trinket X
- Origin: Toronto, Canada
- Genres: Hyperpop; electropop; synth-pop; glitch pop
- Occupations: Singer; songwriter; producer
- Years active: 2020–present
- Formerly of: Helix Tears; GoonnCity
- Website: warehost.net

8485 or Eighty is a Canadian singer, songwriter, and music producer. She is affiliated with the hyperpop scene and formerly of the collective Helix Tears. She frequently collaborates with other experimental artists, such as Anamanaguchi, Aldn, Danny Brown, Ericdoa, Midwxst, Underscores, and Whethan.

== Early life ==
8485 began playing in post-hardcore bands at 14 years old, performing Billy Talent covers and penning songs inspired by Breaking Benjamin and Pierce the Veil. She described her musical influences at 18 years old as "Tumblr pop girls", specifically citing Grimes' Art Angels and Marina and the Diamonds' Electra Heart. An October 2020 profile described her as an indie singer and guitarist whose career began in Toronto, Canada.

== Discography ==
From Apple Music and Spotify

=== Studio albums ===
Title	Details
Personal Protocol	Released: June 23, 2023; Label: Eyeball Records; Formats: CD, LP, cassette, digital download, streaming

=== Compilation albums ===
Title	Details
alpha testing	Released: December 4, 2020; Label: Self-released; Formats: Digital download, streaming

=== Extended plays ===
Title	Details
tracing paths (with Blackwinterwells)	Released: January 31, 2021; Label: Helix Tears, Ratgirl Records; Formats: 7-inch vinyl, digital download, streaming
plague town	Released: April 14, 2021; Label: Ratgirl Records; Formats: LP, CD, cassette, digital download, streaming
software gore	Released: February 1, 2024; Label: Self-released; Formats: Digital download, streaming

=== Singles ===
==== As lead artist ====
Title	Year	Album
"Ctrl" (with Blackwinterwells)	2020	Non-album singles
"So Dark"	2020	Non-album singles
"Special" (with Alice Gas)	2020	Non-album singles
"V10L3T"	2020	Non-album singles
"Skinz"	2020	Non-album singles
"I Want the Song 2 Never End"	2020	Non-album singles
"Dress"	2020	Non-album singles
"1:15"	2020	Non-album singles
"SUBLIM8"	2020	Non-album singles
"4real"	2020	Non-album singles
"Yeah yeah yeah"	2020	Non-album singles
"Duress"	2020	Non-album singles
"Itmakesmesosad" (with D0llywood1 & Blackwinterwells)	2020	Non-album singles
"L33CH" (with JOHNNASCUS)	2020	Non-album singles
"✞"	2020	Non-album singles
"Gen 2"	2020	alpha testing
"Drown U"	2021	Non-album singles
"Whimper"	2021	Non-album singles
"Southview"	2021	plague town
"3cheers"	2021	Personal Protocol
"Scribbles" (featuring Drainpuppet)	2023	Personal Protocol
"Atlantis (2˚)"	2023	Personal Protocol
"Goreblog" (featuring Bod [包家巷] & Glasear)	2023	software gore
"Something bad" (with Blackwinterwells)	2023	software gore
"G.I.R.L." (with Danny Brown)	2025	Non-album singles
"The Fear"	2026	Non-album singles
"I Feel Fantastic"	2026	Non-album singles
"Buzzbands"	2026	Non-album singles
"Rabbit Heart"	2026	Non-album singles

==== As featured artist ====
Title	Year	Album
"4giv Me" (Lil Eli featuring 8485, Popstarbills, & Blxty)	2020	Non-album singles
"Forget Me" (Luvox featuring Lil Eli & 8485)	2020	Non-album singles
"Sour" (Grandee featuring 8485)	2020	Non-album singles
"Care" (Mental featuring 8485)	2020	Non-album singles
"Apparition" (Blackwinterwells featuring Funeral, Chach, Yung Skrrt, Grandee, Mental, Popstarbills, Angelus, Fns, 8485, Kuru, Kite, Killz, & Midwxst)	2020	Non-album singles
"To Clear U From My Head" (Polar333 featuring 8485)	2020	Non-album singles
"Hideaway" (Helix Tears featuring Blxty, Blackwinterwells, 8485, Taylor Morgan & Funeral)	2020	Non-album singles
"Woah Now" (KevinHilfiger featuring 8485 & Jackie Platinum)	2020	Non-album singles
"Bhop" (Wrk Ethic featuring Blackwinterwells, Popstarbills, 8485, Angelus, Kid Trash, Afternoon & Yung Skrrt)	2020	Non-album singles
"Luv 2 Miku" (KuttaraNeru featuring 8485)	2020	Non-album singles
"Dizzy" (Dylann featuring 8485)	2020	Non-album singles
"Temptation" (Nezu featuring 8485)	2020	Error
"FWYS" (Blackwinterwells featuring 8485 & Doxia)	2020	Non-album singles
"Losing Myself" (Fns featuring 8485)	2020	Non-album singles
"IH8" (Phixel featuring 8485)	2020	Shapes and Colors
"Mixd Up" (I9bonsai featuring Blackwinterwells & 8485)	2020	Non-album singles
"Fatigue" (Angelus featuring 8485)	2020	Non-album singles
"Make It Real" (Petal Supply, remix by Afternoon featuring 8485)	2020	Non-album singles
"Dualist" (Bella Lugxsi remix featuring 8485)	2020	Non-album singles
"Thoughts from the Top of a Cliff" (Lowly God featuring 8485)	2020	Non-album singles
"Autumn" (2504 featuring Blackwinterwells & 8485)	2020	Non-album singles
"Moshpit" (Xadvoi featuring Swirl & 8485)	2020	Non-album singles
"Always On My Mind" (Emotionals featuring 8485)	2020	Non-album singles
"On Guard!" (Bedhead featuring 8485)	2020	Non-album singles
"There For You" (Crystal Statues featuring 8485, Grandee & STM)	2020	Non-album singles
"ImGonnaGetMyRevenge" (D0llywood1 featuring Alice Gas, Blackwinterwells, & 8485)	2020	Non-album singles
"By Your Side" (Midwxst featuring Blackwinterwells & 8485)	2020	Secrets
"I Want My Shirt Back" (Lovesickxo featuring 8485)	2020	Non-album singles
"Rubber" (Grandee featuring 8485)	2020	Non-album singles
"Ignored" (ericdoa featuring 8485)	2020	Non-album singles
"Here On My Own" (Flood featuring 8485)	2020	Non-album singles
"Walk" (Nomu featuring Blackwinterwells & 8485)	2020	Non-album singles
"All I Wanted" (Avit featuring 8485)	2020	UVC Presents: An Unwired Christmas
"Weathered" (Blackwinterwells featuring 8485)	2021	Non-album single
"Leave Me" (Zumtru featuring 8485)	2021	I Miss My Friend
"Do U Hear Me?" (Iris Day featuring 8485)	2021	Non-album singles
"Goodbye!!!" (Paprika featuring 8485 & Blackwinterwells)	2021	Non-album singles
"IDKU" (Helix Tears featuring Blxty, Yurms, Chava, Blackwinterwells, Capoxxo, 8485 & Sebii)	2021	Non-album singles
"Take Me Back" (Senses featuring 8485)	2021	Non-album singles
"Your Favorite Sidekick" (underscores featuring 8485)	2021	Fishmonger
"Gladesong" (Bandanabloom featuring Blackwinterwells & 8485)	2021	Non-album single
"I'm Thinking of Ending Things" (Yurms featuring 8485)	2021	I'm Thinking of Ending Things
"F.U.A." (Hearteyes featuring 8485)	2021	Headbangers 2
"Hellbent" (Maple featuring 8485)	2021	Plastic Surgeon
"Instant Sobriety" (Fish Narc featuring 8485)	2021	Camouflage
"Water Resistant" (Anamanaguchi featuring 8485)	2021	Non-album singles
"Falling Up" (Blackwinterwells featuring 8485)	2021	Non-album singles
"2Steps" (Rhythmics featuring 8485)	2021	Non-album singles
"Halations" (Blackwinterwells featuring 8485)	2022	Non-album singles
"Shelter in Place" (Layen_ featuring 8485)	2022	Non-album singles
"All New Edition" (Reserv featuring 8485)	2022	In the Shape Of
"Complicated" (Whethan featuring Aldn & 8485)	2022	Midnight
"Vivisect" (Blackwinterwells featuring 8485)	2022	Crystal Shards
"This Might Be Our Last December" (Poptropicaslutz! featuring 8485)	2022	Just in Case the World Ends
"Disaster" (Fish Narc featuring 8485)	2022	Non-album singles
"Apartmnt" (Aldrch featuring 8485)	2022	Non-album singles
"You Know" (Heavn featuring 8485)	2022	Suburbia
"I May Lost, but I'm Not a Lost Cause" (Hospital Gown featuring 8485 & Sam Ray)	2022	Diamond Life 2
"Paper Plane" (Blackwinterwells featuring 8485)	2022	Protector
"On&On" (Chrmng, featuring 8485)	2022	Non-album singles
"Sweet Dreams" (Blackwinterwells featuring 8485)	2023	Non-album singles
"Levitate" (Nares featuring 8485)	2024	Non-album singles
"Flowers" (Danny Brown featuring 8485)	2025	Stardust
