= Unmusique =

2025 mixtape by Lucy Bedroque

Mixtape by Lucy Bedroque
- Released: May 16, 2025
- Genres: Rage; digicore
- Length: 39:55
- Label: DeadAir
- Producers: 177P; 2dah; 9lives; Blxty; Catiobel; Cranes; Egobreak; Inno; Ivvys; Lucy Bedroque; M8I; Northernscence; Popilization; Rochambeau; Skai; Thr6x; YK

Lucy Bedroque chronology
Fête de la Vanille (2024)	Unmusique (2025)	Sororite (2025)

Singles from Unmusique
- 1. "Yes, You May" Released: January 13, 2025

Unmusique is the debut mixtape by the American musician Lucy Bedroque. It was released by DeadAir Records on May 16, 2025. The mixtape features guest appearances from Prettifun and Jackzebra.

Upon release, Unmusique received a positive critical reception. It was issued on CD and vinyl on July 22, 2025.

== Release and promotion ==
Bedroque first hinted at the upcoming album with a tweet on December 24, 2024, where he simply tweeted out the album's name. After the tweet, throughout 2025, Bedroque would preview the tracks through his social media accounts. Then in the summer, on April 25, 2025, Bedroque would perform at UCLA and would perform multiple songs off of Unmusique. A month later, on May 5, 2025, DeadAir Records would announce that Bedroque had been signed and his mixtape would be released on May 16, 2025. Upon release and positive reception, Unmusique was later issued on CD and vinyl on July 22, 2025.

== Critical reception ==
Professional ratings
Review scores
Source	Rating
Pitchfork	7.4/10
The Needle Drop	7/10

Music critic Kieran Press-Reynolds, writing for Pitchfork described Unmusique as an "infectious juggernaut of blown-out sounds". Press-Reynolds compared "Cara Mia" to the music of Ecco2k, also describing the song as sounding like "a computer sputtering as if it had been infected by malware". He found "Ultraviolet" to be a highlight on the mixtape, saying the song "smacks like a supersize Sprite's worth of sucrose". He also highlighted Bedroque "locking into the beat like it's a piece of armor" on "2010 Justin Bieber", as well as "pleas and frustrations toward a relationship gone awry" on "Cat's Eye". Press-Reynolds was however slightly critical towards the mixtape's consistency, and felt that some songs, such as "Smackdown", could have been shelved.

The Fader found Unmusique to be a "wholesale deconstruction". They highlighted "glittery rage" on "2010 Justin Bieber" and "brooding, pitched-down luxury" on "Smackdown". They also described "Ouija" as being "more cyberpunk industrial that straight post-rage". Describing the mixtape overall, they stated that "what Bedroque has built contains new dimensions that weren't present before".

Anthony Fantano of The Needle Drop gave the album a decent amount of praise, claiming that the album is something different compared to what rappers usually go for when releasing albums. He writes that if fans listen to rappers such as Playboi Carti and Lil Uzi Vert, they will be used to the "splashy overwhelming production, certain vocal inflections and flows that Lucy engages in when rapping." The album sees Bedroque blend influences from the world of digicore, pop, EDM, electro, and a little industrial, too. Fantano wrote that the album seems "inconsistent" by Bedroque, adding that "Lucy delivers way more bangers and bops than flops on their debut mixtape." Fantano also rated the album a "light seven out of ten", giving the album its respect and flowers, despite its inconsistency.

Vivian Medithi of The Fader wrote how Unmusique is "a blown out digicore bonanza" of an album. John Norris of V Magazine wrote how Unmusique saw Bedroque delve more into rage genre, writing how tracks such as "Ultraviolet" and "G6 Anthem" were "wildly blown out" and were catnip for moshpits.

According to David Crone of AllMusic, he wrote how the album takes major influence from EDM and rage sound, but this time features more crunchier and blown-out sounds, which helped established Bedroque's name within the underground rap scene.

== Track listing ==
All tracks are written by Lucy Bedroque.

Unmusique track listing
No.	Title	Producer(s)	Length
1.	"Speakers Never Learn"	Lucy Bedroque	2:15
2.	"G6 Anthem"	Lucy Bedroque	3:15
3.	"Ultraviolet" (with Prettifun)	Egobreak; 9lives	3:07
4.	"2010 Justin Bieber"	M8I	1:52
5.	"Smackdown"	Egobreak	2:18
6.	"Fenty Face"	Skai	2:14
7.	"Made in Italy"	Northernscence; Popilization; 177P	2:06
8.	"Tout Naturel"	Blxty; Inno; Rochambeau	2:31
9.	"Finish Him" (with Jackzebra)	Ivvys; Thr6x; 2dah	1:43
10.	"Ouija"	Skai	2:08
11.	"I Am Impossible"	M8I	1:58
12.	"Cara Mia"	Lucy Bedroque	2:34
13.	"Ignorant"	Cranes; YK	2:13
14.	"One of Us Is Lying"	Lucy Bedroque	3:19
15.	"Unmusique"	Lucy Bedroque	2:30
16.	"Cat's Eye"	9lives	1:59
17.	"Yes, You May"	Catiobel	1:53
Total length:			39:55
