= B0YG1RL =

Band from Miami

B0YG1RL is a art collective duo based out of Miami, Florida. The black and queer group creates music and movies. The pop-rap lyrics are sung primarily in Haitian Creole. The group has created with umru, prblm, and DJ Travella. They have also provided support for Yung Lean, Arca, Shygirl, and Kaytranda.
