= Alt TikTok =

Youth subculture

Alt TikTok (or 2020 Alt) is an online youth subculture and internet community that emerged on TikTok in 2020. Alt TikTok users (also known as alt girls, alt boys, or alt kids) emerged as primarily LGBTQ+ individuals who were in contrast to "Straight TikTok" which was seen as the mainstream and heteronormative side of the platform.

The subculture became closely associated with music surrounding the hyperpop scene, particularly 100 gecs and also led to a short-lived fashion style and Internet aesthetic adopted by Generation Z during the COVID-19 lockdowns. Notable artists associated with the movement included Girl in Red, Freddie Dredd, David Shawty, WHOKILLEDXIX, and 645AR. While "alt kid" might imply a general association with traditional alternative fashion, the subculture was more an offshoot of e-girls and e-boys. In 2023, the hashtag #altfashion on TikTok amassed over 1.8 billion views.

== History ==
Around mid-2020, users on TikTok began to group different content on the site into labels like "elite TikTok", "deep TikTok", and "floptok". These categories acted as different "sides of TikTok", deviating from mainstream lip syncing, online trends, and dance videos. Alt TikTok became one of the many subcultural communities to emerge during this period, initially referred to interchangeably with "elite TikTok". The movement quickly identified itself with alternative and queer users, in contrast to "Straight TikTok", also known as the "straight side of TikTok", which was seen as the mainstream and heteronormative side of the platform.

Alt TikTok was accompanied by memes with surrealist or supernatural themes (sometimes being described as cursed), such as videos with heavy saturation and humanoid animals. One of the popular videos from Alt TikTok, gaining 18 million likes, shows a llama dancing to a cover of a song from a Russian commercial by the cereal brand Miel Pops, later becoming a viral audio. Some Alt TikTok users personified brands and products in what was referred to as Retail TikTok. In 2020, Rolling Stone described Alt TikTok as "one of the primary countercultures on the app."

In 2020, American journalist Taylor Lorenz stated in an article of The New York Times, "Every pop sensation needs its ironic counterpoints. Alt Tiktok gets it done. [...] alt TikTok stars like Mooptopia are mainstays on the more indie side of the app. They aren't the popular crowd, but their cool, quirky content still attracts millions."

=== Trump rally trolling ===
In June 2020, alt TikTok and K-pop twitter users coordinated a strategy to ruin a Trump rally in Tulsa, Oklahoma. American politician and activist Alexandria Ocasio-Cortez later saluted the individuals for their "Trump troll".

== Alt subculture ==
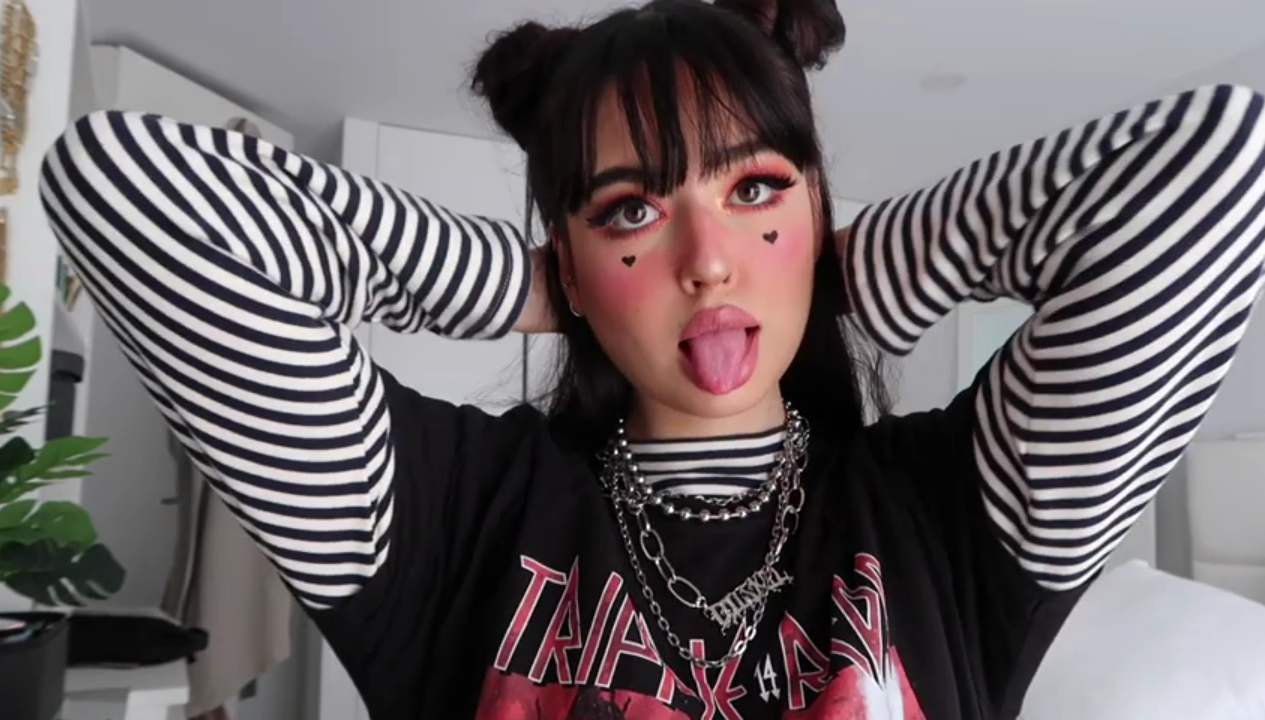
E-girl with typical fashion and makeup

In 2020, Alt TikTok was one of many subcultural communities to emerge on TikTok, alongside Deep TikTok (aka DeepTok) and Flop TikTok (aka Floptok). The alt kid subculture emerged from Alt TikTok primarily among young Gen Z women, influenced by online fashion and aesthetics shaped by e-girls and e-boys. The movement was accelerated by the COVID-19 lockdowns, while the subculture itself stood in opposition to mainstream "Straight TikTok" and the VSCO girl movement, primarily adopting aspects of queer and alternative culture.

While the phrase might imply a general association with alternative fashion or alternative culture, it is more accurately understood as a specific internet-driven outgrowth of online aesthetic youth subcultures like e-girls and e-boys. The alt subculture's visual style blended influences from goth, punk, emo, and grunge, often expressed through fashion, music taste, and online presence.

=== Style and music ===
The style of alt-girls is reminiscent of a myriad of previous alternative fashion trends, often blending these influences with online aesthetics. In 2020, TikTok alt-girls were teens ranging from ages 13 to 16, who tended to wear friendship bracelets, goth boots, Dr. Martens, bunny and frog hats, piercings, and split-dyed hair, as well as iconography lifted from Monster Energy and Hello Kitty. Some alt-girls displayed a love of cosplay, while drawing from Japanese anime and manga, particularly Danganronpa and Haikyu!!, which originally gained traction on the app through Anime TikTok (aka Anitok).

Alt TikTok has been noted for being primarily influenced by queer and alternative culture, positioning itself in contrast to "Straight TikTok", which focused on mainstream dances and music. Alt kids frequently intersected with the e-girls and e-boys subculture, in terms of music, style, visual media, and aesthetics.

Several musicians and artists were closely associated with the alt subculture, particularly those in the hyperpop scene, while alt tiktok users became important in the wider popularization of artists like 100 gecs. Notable prominent artists associated with Alt Tiktok included Girl in Red, Freddie Dredd, David Shawty, WHOKILLEDXIX, and 645AR, alongside music by YouTubers turned musicians such as Wilbur Soot's "I'm in Love With an E‐Girl" and Corpse Husband's "E-Girls Are Ruining My Life!".

== Legacy ==
In 2020, Pitchfork claimed Alt TikTok as having an influence on wider music trends, stating: "Alt TikTok's music is now a hot zone for major record labels, pushing it even further into the mainstream". After the COVID-19 lockdowns, Alt TikTok, alongside its subculture, fell out of prominence and was taken over by other Gen Z-related internet aesthetics, developments, and online trends.

== See also ==
- Alternative fashion – Fashion that does not conform to mainstream styles
- COVID-19 lockdowns – Restrictions imposed during the COVID-19 pandemic
- Digicore – Music genre
- Dream SMP – Minecraft multiplayer server
- E-Girls Are Ruining My Life! – American YouTuber and musician (born 1997)
- E-kid – Youth subculture
- Generation Z – Cohort born from 1997 to 2012
- Hello Kitty – Fictional character by Sanrio
- Hyperpop – Music genre
- Internet aesthetics – Visual styles and subcultures associated with the internet
- List of subcultures
- Monster Energy – Brand of energy drinks
- PogChamp – Emote originating from Twitch
- Your New Boyfriend – 2020 single by Wilbur Soot
- Youth subculture – Subcultures associated with young people
- Weird Twitter – Genre of internet humor
- Weird Soundcloud – Genre of parody music, usually associated with SoundCloud
- YouTube Poop – Video parody genre
