= Lucy Bedroque =

American rapper and producer (born 2006)

- Also known as: Lostrushi; Fyemario; Syxxru; Glutmother; Loru
- Born: Jeremiah Jabulani Mark; May 7, 2006 (age 20); New York City, New York, U.S.
- Origin: Los Angeles, California, U.S.
- Genres: Rage; experimental hip-hop; digicore; sigilkore; hyperpop; glitchcore
- Occupations: Rapper; singer; songwriter; record producer
- Years active: 2020 – present
- Labels: deadAir; Atlantic

Jeremiah Jabulani Mark (born May 7, 2006), known professionally as Lucy Bedroque (formerly Lostrushi, stylized in lowercase), is an American rapper, singer and record producer based in Los Angeles. In 2025, they (Note: Bedroque uses they/he pronouns. This article uses they/them for consistency.) released their debut mixtape Unmusique.

== Early life ==
Jeremiah Jabulani Mark was born on May 7, 2006 in The Bronx, New York City. They are of Zambian descent. At the age of nine, they moved from New York City to Los Angeles.

== Career ==
=== 2020–2024: Early career and debut album ===
Mark was making lofi hip-hop instrumentals when in 2020 they were inspired by digicore artists Quinn and Twikipedia to start using their voice in recordings. Around 2021, they and frequent collaborator Kaystrueno coined the term "maplekore", a sound inspired by the South Korean MMORPG MapleStory.

In June 2023, Mark released their debut album Sisterhood (stylized in all uppercase). The sound has been described as a "lo-fi [...] demo tape". Among the artists sampled in the project are rock bands Linkin Park, Malice Mizer, and Dir En Grey. Over the following years the album garnered a cult following.

In 2024, Mark officially changed their name from Lostrushi to Lucy Bedroque, explaining in an interview more than a year later, that they came up with their original name when they were 14 and now wanted a name that meant something to them. That same year they released three EPs, one of them a collaboration with fellow Los Angeles rapper and producer Egobreak.

=== 2025–present: Breakthrough with Unmusique ===
Mark's debut mixtape Unmusique was released in May 2025 by deadAir Records. In a review by Pitchfork, the album was described as trading in the "frailty" of earlier projects for a harder rage sound, going as far as being compared to rappers such as Playboi Carti and Lil Uzi Vert. Several critics have noted a strong EDM influence on Unmusique. For Mark, it was a notable deviation from their usual self-produced sound. They explained that the title is a reference to this experimentation and collaboration with other producers. The album is Mark's first release under a label. Shortly before the release of Unmusique, Bedroque joined labelmate Jane Remover for six concerts on their "Turn Up Or Die" tour across North America. In January 2026, it was announced that Bedroque would feature on the lineup of Rolling Loud 2026. In March 2026, Maryland digicore artist Kuru announced a North American tour featuring Mark and collaborator 9lives. Mark started working on Sisterhood's direct successor in 2023. Talking about their ambitions for the album, then already titled Svelte Child (also stylized in all uppercase), they said they want to mix Sisterhood's sound palette with shoegaze, math rock, metal, and happy hardcore.

Another potential project, the mixtape ROYGBIV, has been teased by Mark and collaborators Prettifun and Egobreak throughout 2025, appearing only in a few features and a single in March 2026. In an article by The Fader, Mark was listed as one of the 32 coolest artists of 2026. In May, Mark announced their second album (and first under the Lucy Bedroque alias), C, would be released in June 2026. It was later delayed indefinitely, then announced in their game, Paradise Chateau, to be released on September 18, 2026. The release was preceded by the lead single "Speed Demon".

Mark has collaborated with artists such as 9lives, Jane Remover, Prettifun, Egobreak, and Jackzebra. They are also featured on the BloodLuxe edition of Philadelphia rapper Slayr's 2025 mixtape Half Blood.

== Discography ==
=== Studio albums ===
Title	Album details
Sisterhood (as lostrushi)	Released: June 23, 2023; Label: Self-released; Formats: Digital download, streaming
C	Released: September 18, 2026; Label: deadAir; Formats: CD, vinyl, cassette, digital download, streaming

=== Mixtapes ===
Title	Album details
Unmusique	Released: May 16, 2025; Label: deadAir; Formats: CD, vinyl, digital download, streaming

=== Collaborative mixtapes ===
Title	Album details
ROYGBIV (with Egobreak and prettifun)	Scheduled: TBA; Label: TBA; Formats: TBA

=== Extended plays ===
Title	Album details
Amy	Released: May 4, 2024; Label: Self-released; Formats: Digital download, streaming
Fête de la Vanille	Released: October 4, 2024; Label: Self-released; Formats: Digital download, streaming

=== Collaborative extended plays ===
Title	Album details
Tether (with Egobreak)	Released: August 3, 2024; Label: Self-released; Formats: Digital download, streaming

=== Compilations ===
Title	Album details
Sororite	Released: July 22, 2025; Label: deadAir; Formats: CD, vinyl
B4C	Released: May 10, 2026; Label: Self-released; Formats: Digital download, streaming

== Tours ==
=== Headlining ===
"Lucy Bedroque + Kuru" (North America and Europe)

"002 Tour" (North America and Europe)

"003 Tour" (North America and Europe)

=== Supporting ===
"The Pirouette Tour" (supporting 2hollis)
