= Lungskull =

French rapper (2006–2026)

- Lungskull in 2021

Background information
- Born: Odin Olsen; 9 January 2006; Paris, France
- Died: 11 September 2026 (aged 20) Cape Town, South Africa
- Genre: Robloxcore
- Occupations: Rapper; producer
- Years active: 2019–2026

Odin Olsen (9 January 2006 – 11 September 2026), known professionally as Lungskull (stylized in all lowercase), was a French rapper and producer. Credited with popularizing the microgenre Robloxcore, he gained popularity during the COVID-19 pandemic with the release of his song "Foreign".

== Life and career ==
Odin Olsen was born in Paris, France on 9 January 2006. He grew up in Molde, Norway, as well as San Francisco, California.

Lungskull gained popularity in 2020 with the release of the song "Foreign", which Kieran Press-Reynolds of The New York Times credited with popularizing the microgenre Robloxcore. The song was featured in over 40 thousand videos on TikTok and was spread through digital boomboxes in the video game Roblox during the COVID-19 pandemic, causing its popularity to spread. As of 2026, the song has over 10 million plays on Spotify. Lungskull later released the album Norgates Vol. 1. He collaborated with several fellow rappers and producers, including Jaydes, Wifiskeleton and Yuke.

== Death ==
Lungskull died on 11 September 2026, in Cape Town, South Africa. His death was announced on Instagram by his brother Aksel Olsen, known professionally as Akselbolt, describing the cause of death as a drug overdose. In the months before his death, Lungskull expressed struggles with drug addiction on social media and stated he had gone to South Africa to seek rehab. His funeral was held at the Molde Cathedral on 14 October 2026.

== Artistry ==
Lungskull's mother, Christel Olsen, said music was "a passion throughout his life", and said he often listened to artists like Black Eyed Peas growing up. In a 2024 review of Norgates Vol. 1, Steve Juon of RapReviews described Lungskull's use of "ridiculous bass levels" as "distinctive".

== Discography ==
Albums

- Norgates Vol. 1 (2020)
- Norgates Vol. 2 (2021)
- Empathy (2021)
- Sleep (2022)
- Lungskull (2023)
