= Blackwinterwells =

Canadian musician and producer (born 1996)

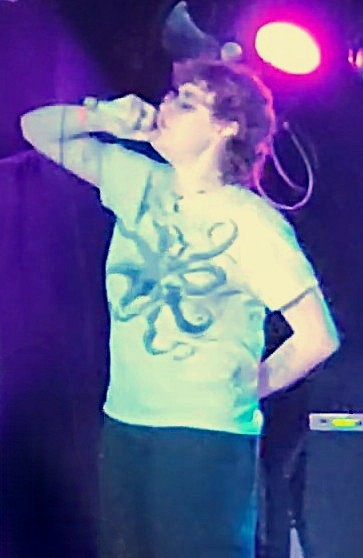
- Blackwinterwells performing in Toronto in 2024

Background information
- Also known as: Drainpuppet
- Born: July 5, 1996 (age 30); Hamilton, Ontario, Canada
- Genres: Hyperpop; emo rap
- Occupations: Musician; producer
- Years active: Early 2010s–present
- Labels: Eyeball; Bitbird
- Member of: Helix Tears; Bloodhounds; Garden Avenue

Blackwinterwells (born July 5, 1996) is a Canadian musician and producer. Born in Hamilton, Ontario, he (Note: Blackwinterwells identified as a trans woman as of 2024. As of 2026, he uses it/its and he/him pronouns. This article uses he/him pronouns for consistency.) began releasing dubstep music on SoundCloud in the early 2010s. He was inspired by Lil Peep to produce cloud rap, for which he founded the collective Helix Tears in 2018. Blackwinterwells became associated with hyperpop in 2020 after producing the popular song "Bad Idea" for Quinn. He also produced for musicians such as Glaive, D0llywood1, Midwxst, and 8485. His output increased during the COVID-19 pandemic, releasing collaborative albums with Helix Tears and many singles. In 2023, he performed in the Pitchfork Music Festival.

Blackwinterwells describes his music as emo rap rather than hyperpop. More downtempo and ambient than other hyperpop, it is illustrative of competing definitions of the genre. He uses FL Studio and builds songs around synths. His workflow often involves sending stems to friends through the Internet. His 2022 collaborative album Crystal Shards describes collapsing relationships, whereas his earlier music is often about fantasy worlds.

== Biography ==
Blackwinterwells was born on July 5, 1996, in Hamilton, Ontario. He grew up listening to new wave music his parents played, such as the band Tears for Fears. He was impressed by dubstep producers such as Skrillex in the early 2010s. At age 14, while playing the video game World of Warcraft, another player in his dungeon told him about the genre. After, he discovered and downloaded FL Studio. Blackwinterwells produced dubstep music for a few years and gained a small audience. He initially released music as Drainpuppet on SoundCloud before using the name Blackwinterwells. He later shifted to producing future bass and dance music with a sad atmosphere. Inspired by Lil Peep and Bladee, he began producing cloud rap around 2018. He founded the musical collective Helix Tears in the genre that year. Blackwinterwells had previously not felt confident recording vocals, but after Lil Peep died, he felt an urgency to practice more. According to Dazed, he considered Lil Peep a "reason for being". By 2019, Blackwinterwells had 400 followers on SoundCloud.

Drainpuppet was eventually retired due to new interests. During the COVID-19 pandemic, Blackwinterwells greatly increased his output. He became involved in the hyperpop scene, a community of musicians creating loud and energetic pop music, and found many close friends. His association with the scene solidified in 2020 when he produced the song "Bad Idea" for Quinn. Both were in the same Discord server consisting of around 50 young musicians. During a video call in February, he sent a glitchy beat with harsh synths to her, and she quickly recorded vocals about a recent argument she had on Twitter. Blackwinterwells was so excited by the song, which received 10,000 plays on SoundCloud in a few days, that he had trouble sleeping. "Bad Idea" was placed on Spotify's "Hyperpop" playlist and received over one million streams on the platform by November.

Blackwinterwells released his debut album Seraph in April. He led a successful solo career; his 2020 song "Iris" became his most streamed on Spotify. However, he also became known for producing for hyperpop musicians such as Glaive, D0llywood1, Midwxst, and 8485. In June, Glaive was scouted by a talent manager who heard his song "Sick", produced by Blackwinterwells. Blackwinterwells's second album Stone Ocean released in October. Each track has one or two features from glitchcore musicians in Helix Tears, which had become associated with hyperpop. Teodor Zetko of Exclaim! enjoyed the production and worldbuilding of certain tracks. He praised Blackwinterwells for publicizing and embracing the musicians in the scene and thought D0llywood1's feature on the first and last tracks represented a "cyber-circle of life."

As of 2021, Blackwinterwells was a member of the hyperpop collective Bloodhounds and producer collective Garden Avenue. Alternative Press was excited about Helix Tears, describing its members as glitchcore and HexD transcendentalists. Blackwinterwells released many singles that year. Among them, "Omen" was later analyzed in Transgender Studies Quarterly (TSQ). He also began a real-life friendship with 8485, co-producing four of five songs on her extended play (EP) Plague Town. He released the EP Sulfur in March 2022. His next album Crystal Shards, released in April by Eyeball Records, was written over two years and features Helix Tears members D0llywood1, Bella Lugxsi, Saturn, and Emotionals. In the summer, he toured North America with 8485 and Fish Narc. Blackwinterwells released the album Protector in December, and Xtra Magazine included his single "Gnarlethorne", released by Bitbird, in their year-end list of favourite queer songs. In November 2023, he performed as a supporting act in Paris and London during the Pitchfork Music Festival. That month, The Fader invited him to record a cover of "An Honest Mistake" by the Bravery for a compilation album supporting transgender charities.

== Musical style ==
In a 2021 interview, Blackwinterwells was adamant that his music was emo rap. Others had disagreed, but he thought he only modified the genre by adding synths. He welcomed being associated with hyperpop but thought it was misplaced. The critic Eli Enis thought that Helix Tears becoming associated with the genre shows that the descriptor is very broad. Compared to other hyperpop musicians, his music is more downtempo and ambient. Trey Taylor of The Face cited his style as one competing definition of the genre. Shoegaze, hip-hop, and alt-pop are also influences in his music. More recently, it has been described as leaving hyperpop.

In FL Studio, Blackwinterwells builds songs around synths, usually using subtractive synthesis, whose settings he changes to create a patch. He thought his patches were simple and his workflow was inexpensive compared to his peers. Jessica Canjemanaden of Dazed said that he sends stems, beats, loops, and verses to friends through the Internet. Older and more experienced with Internet music scenes than his peers, Blackwinterwells supported them with sound engineering. Becky Stephenson of New Noise Magazine thought he was "content with a life in the background", citing his Bandcamp description: "sad ghost".

Blackwinterwells wrote lyrics for "Iris" quickly. After many attempts, he decided on a beat with a saw synth melody and saw bass. An arpeggiator played simultaneously in reverse, both chopped, created a back-and-forth sound. Inspired by Skrillex's experimental outros, he turned a vocal chop into "weird chromatic piano bullshit at the end". "Omen" features a looped sample of "Bad Idea". The vocals, in parallel octaves, are autotuned, breathy, and fried. In the music video, greyscale shots repeat of him in a dark staircase, below a radio tower, and watching a snowy suburban neighbourhood from a car. Later, a bedsheet ghost is shown in a forest and graveyard. Westley Montgomery in TSQ thought the ghost was a metaphor for "spectral remnants of the suburban Global North". He said the ghost and fluid vocals refused a fixed subjectification required by society to enforce gender roles. Crystal Shards uses imagery of medical procedures and fragile bodies to describe painful and collapsing relationships. Stephenson thought this differed from his earlier work, which often described fantasy worlds. "Gnarlethorne" has breathy singing and lyrics that switch between storytelling and emotional honestly. The song builds to a dubstep drop characterized by a break.

== Works cited ==
- "8 Emerging Canadian Artists You Need to Hear in December 2021". Exclaim!. December 5, 2021. Archived from the original on December 6, 2021.
- "Auggie Velarde and Blackwinterwells Release 'Flare' Official Music Video". AllHipHop. February 26, 2021. Archived from the original on February 27, 2021.
- "Blackwinterwells Shares an Infectious Cover of 'An Honest Mistake' by the Bravery". The Fader. November 13, 2023. Archived from the original on November 13, 2023.
- "'Omen'". Apple Music (US). Archived from the original on April 4, 2026.
- "Our Favourite Queer and Trans Songs of 2022". Xtra Magazine. December 20, 2022. Archived from the original on December 21, 2022.
- Blackwinterwells. "Blackwinterwells". Archived from the original on July 7, 2026 – via Instagram.
- Blackwinterwells [@blackwntrwells] (July 5, 2022). "hello everyone. its my birthday today (!!!)" (Tweet). Archived from the original on April 4, 2026 – via Twitter.
- Canjemanaden, Jessica (March 17, 2021). "Meet the Young, Terminally Online Artists Shaping the Sound of Hyperpop". Dazed. Photography by Oscar Foster-Kane. Archived from the original on March 17, 2021.
- Dandridge-Lemco, Ben (November 10, 2020). "How Hyperpop, a Small Spotify Playlist, Grew into a Big Deal". The New York Times. Archived from the original on November 10, 2020.
- Darville, Jordan; Helfand, Raphael (December 2, 2022). "New Music Friday: The Best New Albums Out Today". The Fader. Archived from the original on December 3, 2022.
- Darville, Jordan (November 24, 2021). "8485 Is Underground Pop Music's Cheat Code". The Fader. Photography by Aaron Wynia. Archived from the original on November 24, 2021.
- Darville, Jordan (April 29, 2022). "The 13 Projects You Should Stream Now". The Fader. Archived from the original on April 29, 2022.
- Enis, Eli (February 19, 2021). "A Look at Hyperpop Production with Angelus, Blackwinterwells, and Alice Gas". Illustrated by Robin Lewallen. Splice. Archived from the original on February 22, 2021.
- Hunt, El (October 6, 2023). "London Live and Loud: The Essential Autumn Gig Guide". The Standard. Archived from the original on October 7, 2023.
- Matulaityte, Giedre (April 16, 2021). "15 Bands and Solo Artists Who Are Rewriting the Emo Rulebook". Alternative Press. Archived from the original on July 13, 2022.
- Montgomery, Westley (May 2024). "Becoming Spectral: Phantasmagorias of Late Capitalism and Trans Desubjectivity in Hyper-pop". Transgender Studies Quarterly. 11 (2): 370–384. doi:10.1215/23289252-11215548. OCLC 10256067714.
- Solvignon, Marie (May 9, 2023). "Pitchfork Music Festival : Bar Italia, Namasenda et Crumb rejoignent Weyes Blood". Les Inrockuptibles (in French). Archived from the original on May 9, 2023.
- Stephenson, Becky (April 28, 2022). "Album Review: Blackwinterwells – Crystal Shards". New Noise Magazine. Archived from the original on October 1, 2022.
- Taylor, Trey (March 9, 2021). "Hyperpop: Why American Music Isn't Boring". The Face. Photography by Eddie Whelan. Archived from the original on March 9, 2021.
- Zetko, Teodor (October 19, 2020). "Hamilton's Blackwinterwells Leads Glitchcore's Growing Wave on Stone Ocean". Exclaim!. Archived from the original on November 19, 2020.
