= David Shawty =

American rapper

- Born: David Israel Salazar; 1999 (age 26–27); San Jose, California
- Origin: Seattle, Washington
- Genres: Digicore; glitchcore; plugg; hyperpop
- Occupations: Rapper; singer; record producer; songwriter
- Years active: 2016–present
- Formerly of: Nitemare

David Israel Salazar (born 1999), known professionally as David Shawty, is an American rapper and record producer known for pioneering the Internet microgenres digicore and glitchcore.

In 2020, his song "Pressure" with Yungster Jack went viral online. They collaborated on the EP Stupid Fruity Swag in 2021. In 2022, Salazar released the solo album David 3.

== Early life ==
David Israel Salazar was born in 1999 in San Jose, California. He is based in Seattle, Washington.

== Career ==
In 2020, Salazar released the single "Pressure" with Yungster Jack, which later went viral online and spawned several "glitchcore" edits on TikTok. Pitchfork described the single as an "underground hit", which was brought to attention on TikTok by the glitchcore editor "iguana_alana". Writing for Complex, music journalist Kieran Press-Reynolds stated that the song had "invaded mainstream TikTok and racked up big numbers on YouTube and Spotify too." In a Pitchfork article, Press-Reynolds compared the track to Chief Keef's 2015 song "War" and the work of Bladee, Goth Money Records, Metro Zu and Playboi Carti.

According to Ones to Watch, "Pressure" is considered a breakout moment in Salazar's career, described as "loud and abrasive with stuttering vocals and a rushing instrumental that blended both electronic and hip hop". The track was also described as "glitchy".

Press-Reynolds later stated that David Shawty and Yungster Jack's 2020 song "Spawn Camping" started with a sample from an "iconic" Future quote and wouldn't have existed without Lil Uzi Vert.

In 2021, Salazar released the album Stupid Fruity Swag with Yungster Jack. That year, Pitchfork stated that the rise of Alt TikTok had brought attention to Salazar's work. He was also described as a "left-field" artist. British artist Mark Leckey played David Shawty and Yungster Jack on his monthly radio show for NTS Radio. Salazar has collaborated with artists such as Xaviersobased, Novagang, MexikoDro, Callari, fadedblackid, and Hella Sketchy.

== Musical style ==
Salazar's style is noted for extensive use of Auto-Tune and vocal chopping. He has been described as digicore and glitchcore. Writing for Complex, music journalist Kieran Press-Reynolds described the techniques used by David Shawty on the song "Dancing on the Sidewalk Lights Flicker" as "the sounds of a rapper's voice spliced into fragments, placed in front of nearly every bar, like punctuation. 'D-d-d-d,' he warbles, his voice injected with a ludicrous amount of aural Botox (Auto-Tune, pitch shift)." BrooklynVegan described Salazar's production as "weird and cool" and noted his use of vocal chopping and stuttering.

According to Ones to Watch, Salazar "completely rejects a traditional approach when creating music. His melodic, sometimes pitched, vocals are infectious across every track, but what sets him apart most is his inclination to perform over wild experimental beats and the creative way he structures his songs". The publication cited tracks such as "Who Let the Dogs Out" as "standouts" for his "vocal inflections".

== Influence ==
Salazar has been described as a pioneer of the digicore genre. BrooklynVegan credited David Shawty and Yungster Jack as "responsible for the Soundcloud scene's transition from emo rap to hyperpop". According to Pitchfork writer Cat Zhang, the song "Pressure" inspired one of the tags in the song "NEVER MET!" by CMTEN, which was seen as a testament to "the speed at which sonic features mutate and spread in this universe".

== Discography ==
=== Albums ===
Title	Album details
Ooze	Released: 2019; Label: Self-released; Format: Digital download, streaming
Caterpillar	Released: 2021; Label: Self-released; Format: Digital download, streaming
Psycho Nitemare (Creepypasta Love Story)	Released: 2022; Label: Self-released; Format: Digital download, streaming
DAVID 3	Released: 2022; Label: Self-released; Format: Digital download, streaming
ERAMETIN	Released: 2023; Collaborators: David Shawty & Yungster Jack; Label: Self-released; Format: Digital download, streaming
Grand Theft Nitemare	Released: 2023; Label: Self-released; Format: Digital download, streaming
Idaho Blues	Released: 2024; Label: Self-released; Format: Digital download, streaming
Hatch	Released: 2025; Label: Self-released; Format: Digital download, streaming
That I Am	Released: 2025; Label: Self-released; Format: Digital download, streaming

=== Mixtapes ===
Title	Mixtape details
Gossip™	Released: 2018; Collaborators: David Shawty & Yungster Jack; Label: Self-released; Format: Digital download, streaming
Nitemare Samsquanch	Released: 2020; Collaborators: David Shawty & hoodwtch; Label: Self-released; Format: Digital download, streaming
Whatever 2	Released: 2024; Label: Self-released; Format: Digital download, streaming
Molt	Released: 2025; Label: Self-released; Format: Digital download, streaming
THE CREATURE	Released: 2025; Label: Self-released; Format: Digital download, streaming

=== EPs ===
Title	EP details
ByMyLonely	Released: 2016; Label: Self-released; Format: Digital download, streaming
My Heart	Released: 2017; Label: Self-released; Format: Digital download, streaming
Deadboy 2k	Released: 2018; Label: Self-released; Format: Digital download, streaming
Grave Angel	Released: 2018; Collaborators: David Shawty & FadedBlackid; Label: Self-released; Format: Digital download, streaming
Pink Eternity	Released: 2018; Label: Self-released; Format: Digital download, streaming
Grave Angel 2	Released: 2018; Collaborators: David Shawty & FadedBlackid; Label: Self-released; Format: Digital download, streaming
Deathbed - EP	Released: 2018; Label: Self-released; Format: Digital download, streaming
Witch	Released: 2019; Label: Self-released; Format: Digital download, streaming
#NovaJackDavid20 ✰	Released: 2020; Collaborators: Yungster Jack & David Shawty; Label: Self-released; Format: Digital download, streaming
NITEMARE 3200	Released: 2020; Collaborators: David Shawty & Pollari; Label: Self-released; Format: Digital download, streaming
Up Bad	Released: 2021; Label: Self-released; Format: Digital download, streaming
Whatever By David	Released: 2021; Label: Self-released; Format: Digital download, streaming
Stupid Fruity Swag	Released: 2021; Collaborators: David Shawty & Yungster Jack; Label: Self-released; Format: Digital download, streaming
Guardian Ghosts	Released: 2021; Collaborators: BBY GOYARD & David Shawty; Label: Self-released; Format: Digital download, streaming
MyRoom	Released: 2022; Label: Self-released; Format: Digital download, streaming
Pajama 4est	Released: 2023; Label: Self-released; Format: Digital download, streaming
2020	Released: 2023; Label: Self-released; Format: Digital download, streaming
Whatever 1.3	Released: 2024; Label: Self-released; Format: Digital download, streaming
Torture Fest	Released: 2024; Label: Self-released; Format: Digital download, streaming
Sinking House	Released: 2024; Label: Self-released; Format: Digital download, streaming
Amazing Music To Fall Asleep To.	Released: 2025; Label: Self-released; Format: Digital download, streaming
