= BBY Goyard =

American rapper (born 1995)

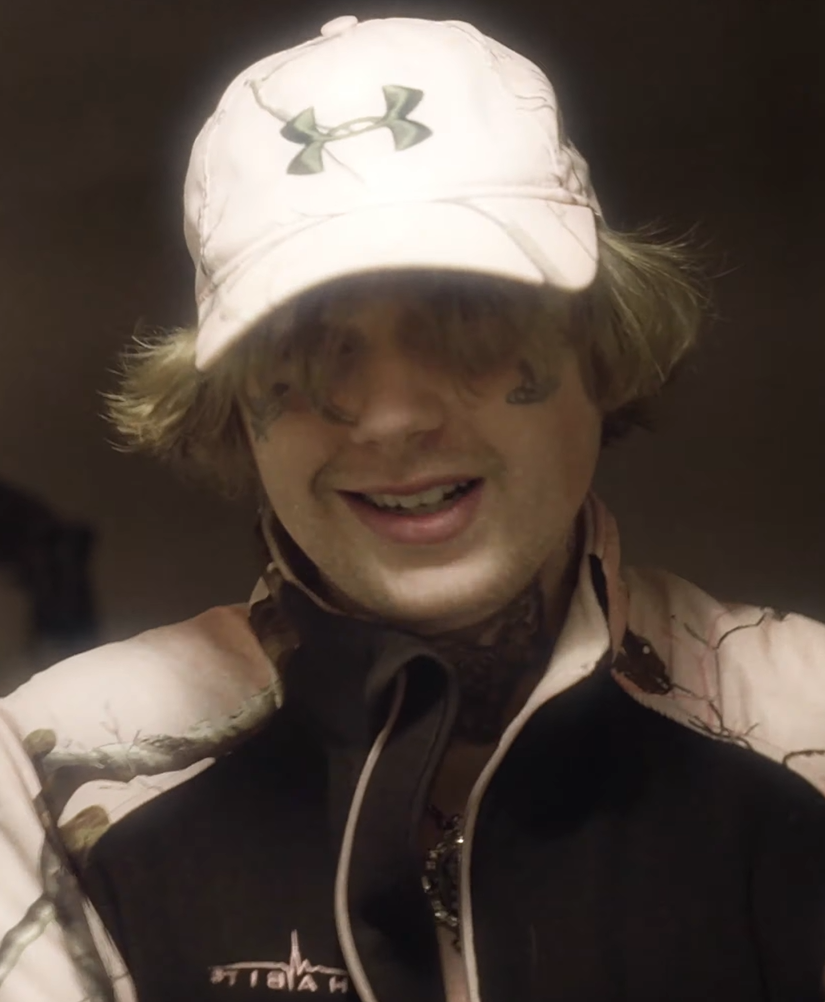
- BBY Goyard in a 2020 music video

Background information
- Born: Tyler Hudson; October 28, 1995 (age 30); Maryland, U.S.
- Genres: Cloud rap
- Years active: 2013–present
- Label: Eyeball Records

Tyler Hudson (born October 28, 1995), better known as BBY Goyard, is an American rapper. Hudson has been credited with influencing the rap scene with his sped-up and pitched-up vocal style, revitalizing DJ tags and popularizing the word "lore" in modern vernacular.

== Early life ==
Tyler Hudson was born on October 28, 1995, in Maryland. After graduating high school, he briefly worked as a pizza deliveryman until moving to North Carolina and beginning to make music at 18.

== Career ==
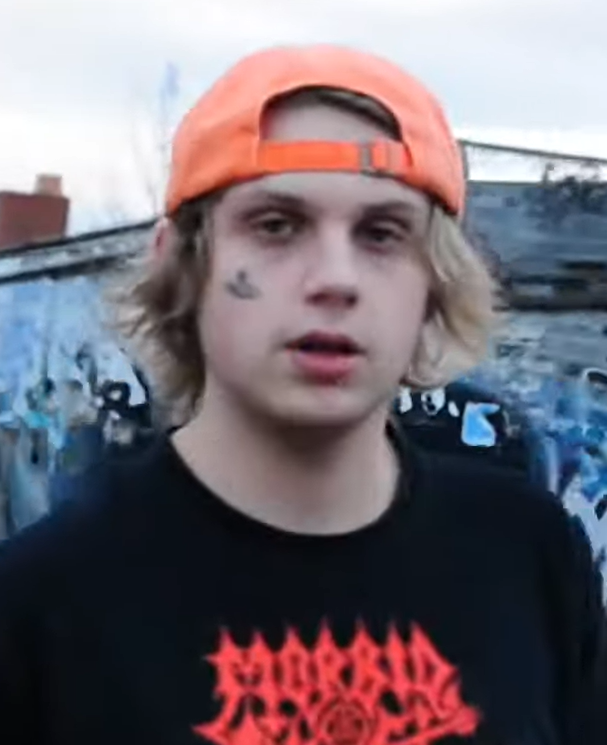
BBY Goyard in a 2018 music video

Goyard released his debut EP, Depth Perception, on April 25, 2019. When describing one of its singles, "The Louvre", Goyard explained that he wanted to create a "nostalgic feeling" and make the song sound "fun yet gritty at the same time". He wanted to incorporate 90's cultural references to invoke introspection and inspire them to dig deeper.

In 2024, Goyard went on tour with the black metal band Portrayal of Guilt. The experience inspired him to release the album Tastemaker in 2025, themed after Dante's Inferno and blending 2000s punk, grunge, and alternative with cloud rap.

== Musical style and artistry ==
Hudson has stated that he is influenced by artists such as Chief Keef, Soulja Boy, and the band All Time Low, in addition to the genres of screamo and pop punk. Goyard stated that his favorite album of all time was I Brought You My Bullets, You Brought Me Your Love by My Chemical Romance. In his songs, he pitches and speeds up his voice, often over breakbeat production. Describing Goyard's 2019 single, "Tarot Card", Will Gendron of The Fader described its instrumental as "electro Zaytoven".

== Discography ==
=== Studio albums ===
- The Secret Lies With Charlotte (2020)
- The Secret Lies with Charlotte 2 (2021)
- 4thwall (2022)
- 4thwall Pt. 2 (2023)
- Loreseeker (with DJ Smokey) (2023)
- Tastemaker (2025)
- Symbolism (with Shadow Wizard Money Gang) (2025)
- The Secret Lies With Charlotte 3 (2025)
- Corsa Della Morte (2026)
- Preakness (2026)

=== Mixtapes ===
- Loose Lips and Sharp Tongues (2019)
- Euphoria (2020)
- Symbiote (2020)
- Spirit (2023)

=== Extended plays ===
- Depth Perception (2019)
- Eastern Promises (2019)
- Ballad of the Dead (with Dani Kiyoko) (2021)
- Guardian Ghosts (with David Shawty) (2021)
- Operation Tree Whisper (with Shawn Ferrari and Egobreak) (2024)
- Shannon Tunes (2024)
- Neo-Building (2025)
