= Novagang =

Hip-hop collective

- Official Novagang logo

Background information
- Also known as: Nova Gang
- Origin: United States
- Genres: Hip-hop; digicore; hyperpop
- Years active: 2018–present
- Label: Novagang
- Members: Angelus; Cet Tora; Dreamnote; Quinn; Zootzie; Exodus1900; Prblm; Gv1nn; Zephrxd; KAY NIVE$; Slappy; Kasper Gem; Kingfelix; Trauma; Ways; Matt Proxy
- Past members: 4am; Aidan; Blushxoxo; Ch2rms; CJ808; Cody Luv; Elxnce; Funeral; Kacie Free; Ko1d; Kurai; Kuru; Lb66; Lieu; Midwxst; Ninetyniiine; ONE YEAR; Saturn; Slade; Stef; Wizardpem; Xaviersobased; Xhris2Eazy; Zandyyorkan
- Website: ngngng.ng

Novagang (stylized in uppercase) is an American hip-hop collective formed in 2018 by rapper and record producer Prblm. The group's name is a portmanteau between their alias "Nova" and "gang".

Novagang was considered one of the early staple digicore collectives in the early 2020s along with Bloodhounds, Helix Tears, Graveem1nd and Co-op. Notable members included Xaviersobased, Midwxst, Kuru, Angelus, Stef, Exodus1900, Kasper Gem, Zootzie, Gv1nn, Strgurrl and Quinn. Rapper Nettspend was a brief affiliate.

== History ==
Novagang was formed by rapper and producer Prblm in 2018. According to New York magazine The Fader, artist Stef co-managed Novagang with Prblm. Stef disliked the term hyperpop to categorize the collective as the group had "a very eclectic sound". The Fader also described the group as an "Internet collective".

According to Rolling Stone magazine, Novagang "feature artists of variously different styles and sounds, but find community with each other in their shared rejection of stylistic limits." In an interview with Dazed magazine, rapper Midwxst stated, "Everyone in helix tears and NOVAGANG" were performing with "different styles, sounds, aesthetics and lives, but having a group of musically gifted people allows us to make music without boundaries." The collective has been associated with the genres hyperpop and digicore.

In 2022, the group released their debut collaborative mixtape H.T.N.G. On August 6, 2023, they released a sequel in the form of H.T.N.G. VOL 2: JUDGEMENT DAY. On August 19, they performed a sold out show in New York City headlined by Osquinn and Xaviersobased. Other acts at the event included Exodus1900, Kasper Gem, Zootzie, Gv1nn and Strgurrl.

Writing for The Fader, music journalist Jordan Darville noted that "Prblm under the dj yzma alias, deconstructs modern music's obsession with pop-punk and so-called 'emo rap' into shards of spacious and compelling sound art." Darville added that Novagang provided a "freewheeling outsider's perspective to the world of experimental rap". In 2025, he stated, "If you organized a gig with some of the guest artists from their discography [...] it would be rap's hottest ticket."

== Notable members ==
Notable members of the collective include Kuru, Angelus, Stef, Midwxst, Xaviersobased, Quinn, Exodus1900, Kasper Gem, Zootzie, Gv1nn and Strgurrl.

=== Angelus ===
Angelus (born January 25, 2004) is a recording artist and producer born in London, United Kingdom and raised in Paris, France. They gained popularity in the Hyperpop and Digicore scene through collaborative production and online releases such as "hope u doing well" and "drama queen". Music journalist Eli Enis, writing for Splice, notes Angelus began making beats in 2017, producing for artists including osquinn, ericdoa, and rappers such as Slayr, Lil Tecca, and Lil Tracy. In 2025, Angelus released their album MEGATRON.

=== Prblm ===
Prblm (born 2002) is a Haitian-American rapper and record producer. They founded the collective Novagang in 2018. They have produced songs and collaborated with artists such as Edward Skeletrix. Music critic Jordan Darville, writing for The Fader, compared their sound to hitting as hard as Working on Dying or showcasing "heart" like Pi'erre Bourne. Darville added that "prblm frequently sounded one step ahead of their contemporaries" citing songs such as "Monkey Quest Freestyle" as drawing from the "jerk revival".

=== Kuru ===
Kuru (born November 14, 2005) is an American rapper from Maryland. They (Note: Kuru uses they/them pronouns.) are a member of digicore collectives such as Novagang, Helix Tears and graveem1nd. They have been described as a "digicore producer" by Pitchfork. In 2024, Kuru released their debut studio album re:wired with production credits from artists such as Twikipedia.

=== Lieu ===
Lieu (stylized in lowercase) (born August 26, 2007) is an American rapper from Livonia, Michigan. In 2021, their song "Threat" gained popularity online through being "bypassed" into the online game Roblox. According to the New York Times, the song would be recognized by musician Phoebe Bridgers on Twitter and in the underground music scene. Music journalist Kieran Press-Reynolds described the song as "being inside a digital dimension where every bass thud and synth shake is an enemy you’re blowing past, every vocal stutter and short-circuited squeak a new obstacle to avoid."

== Musical style and influence ==
Artist Angelus who is a member of the collective described their sound as "NOVA style", which is "loud, nightcored, and all over the place but it makes sense in the end". Novagang has been considered one of the early staple digicore collectives in the early 2020s along with Bloodhounds, Helix Tears, Graveem1nd and Co-op.

Rapper Nettspend was briefly affiliated with Novagang. According to Interview magazine, he found support and community with Novagang's "group of rappers and beatmakers". Other rappers such as Xaviersobased, Midwxst and Quinn had been members of the group. The group also collaborated with artists such as Yungster Jack and David Shawty.

Novagang's merchandise includes T-shirts and beanies. According to Tub magazine, the collective's "I ☠ NG" shirt was worn by Nettspend at the 2023 Novagang show in New York City. The shirt has also been worn by Xaviersobased.

== Discography ==
=== Albums ===
Title	Album details
H.T.N.G. VOL 2: JUDGEMENT DAY	Released: 2023; Label: Self-released; Format: Digital download, streaming
Zephrxd: The Hellsing Conspiracy	Released: 2023; Collaborators: NOVAGANG / Zephrxd; Label: Self-released; Format: Digital download, streaming
H.T.N.G. VOL 2.5: JUDGEMENT DAY: END OF TIMES	Released: 2025; Label: Self-released; Format: Digital download, streaming

=== Mixtapes ===
Title	Mixtape details
H.T.N.G	Released: 2022; Label: Self-released; Format: Digital download, streaming

=== Singles ===
Title	Single details
Purple Rain	Released: 2019; Collaborators: quinn; Label: Self-released; Format: Digital download, streaming
Don't Like Cypher	Released: 2020; Label: Self-released; Format: Digital download, streaming
😢😢😢Fit	Released: 2020; Collaborators: Exodus1900; Label: Self-released; Format: Digital download, streaming
Propane	Released: 2020; Collaborators: emotegi & midwxst; Label: Self-released; Format: Digital download, streaming
DOLLY🐌🐌🐌SLUG	Released: 2020; Label: Self-released; Format: Digital download, streaming
H.D.T.F.	Released: 2021; Collaborators: NOVAGANG & Tony Shhnow; Label: Self-released; Format: Digital download, streaming
Sayittomyface	Released: 2021; Collaborators: midwxst & Exodus1900; Label: Self-released; Format: Digital download, streaming
JELLYFISH	Released: 2021; Collaborators: NOVAGANG / Slade / stef / KAY NIVE$; Label: Self-released; Format: Digital download, streaming
EXODUS1900😡😡😡FIT	Released: 2021; Label: Self-released; Format: Digital download, streaming
I.D.W.T.B	Released: 2021; Label: Self-released; Format: Digital download, streaming
🥳🥳🥳AOTY	Released: 2022; Collaborators: blushxoxo; Label: Self-released; Format: Digital download, streaming
