= Digicore =

Music genre

- Other names: Draincore (early); glitchcore (early)
- Stylistic origins: Hyperpop; trap; emo rap; plugg; cloud rap; nightcore; electronic; EDM; dance
- Cultural origins: Late 2010s – early 2020s, United States
- Typical instruments: Drum machine; autotune; synthesizer; pitch shifter; sampler; hi-hats
- Derivative forms: HexD; glitchcore; jerk; hyperplugg; zoomergaze

Subgenres
- Robloxcore

Other topics
- Internet rap; microgenre; sigilkore; Internet aesthetic; alt TikTok; rage; Novagang; helix tears; Internet music

Digicore (originally known as draincore) is an Internet microgenre of hip-hop and electronic music that developed alongside hyperpop in the late 2010s to early 2020s. The genre is typically made up of artists that share stylistic similarities to Drain Gang and 100 gecs, rather than the "bubblegum bass" musicians signed to the label PC Music. It chiefly draws influence from trap, emo rap, nightcore and cloud rap.

During the late 2010s, the style initially emerged as a Drain Gang-inspired form of online rap music known as "draincore". In 2018, Dalton, a figure in the digicore scene, started a Minecraft and Discord server called "Loser's Club", which became a hub for several of the most popular artists within the digicore scene such as Quinn, Kmoe, Glaive, Ericdoa and Midwxst. The early scene was centered around SoundCloud collectives such as Blackwinterwells' Helix Tears and Prblm's Novagang. Other notable groups include Bloodhounds, Slowsilver03, Graveem1nd, Co-op, Varsity and Goonncity.

By 2019, artist lonelee coined the term "digicore" to replace draincore. The terms "robloxcore", "hyperpop" and "glitchcore" were initially used synonymously with digicore. In 2021, "digicore" was popularized by curator Billie Bugara's SoundCloud playlist of the same name. Artists Yungster Jack and David Shawty are noted as pioneers. Other notable digicore artists include Jane Remover, D0llywood1, Aldn, Quannnic, Lucy Bedroque, Slayr, Kuru, Lieu and Brakence.

== Etymology ==
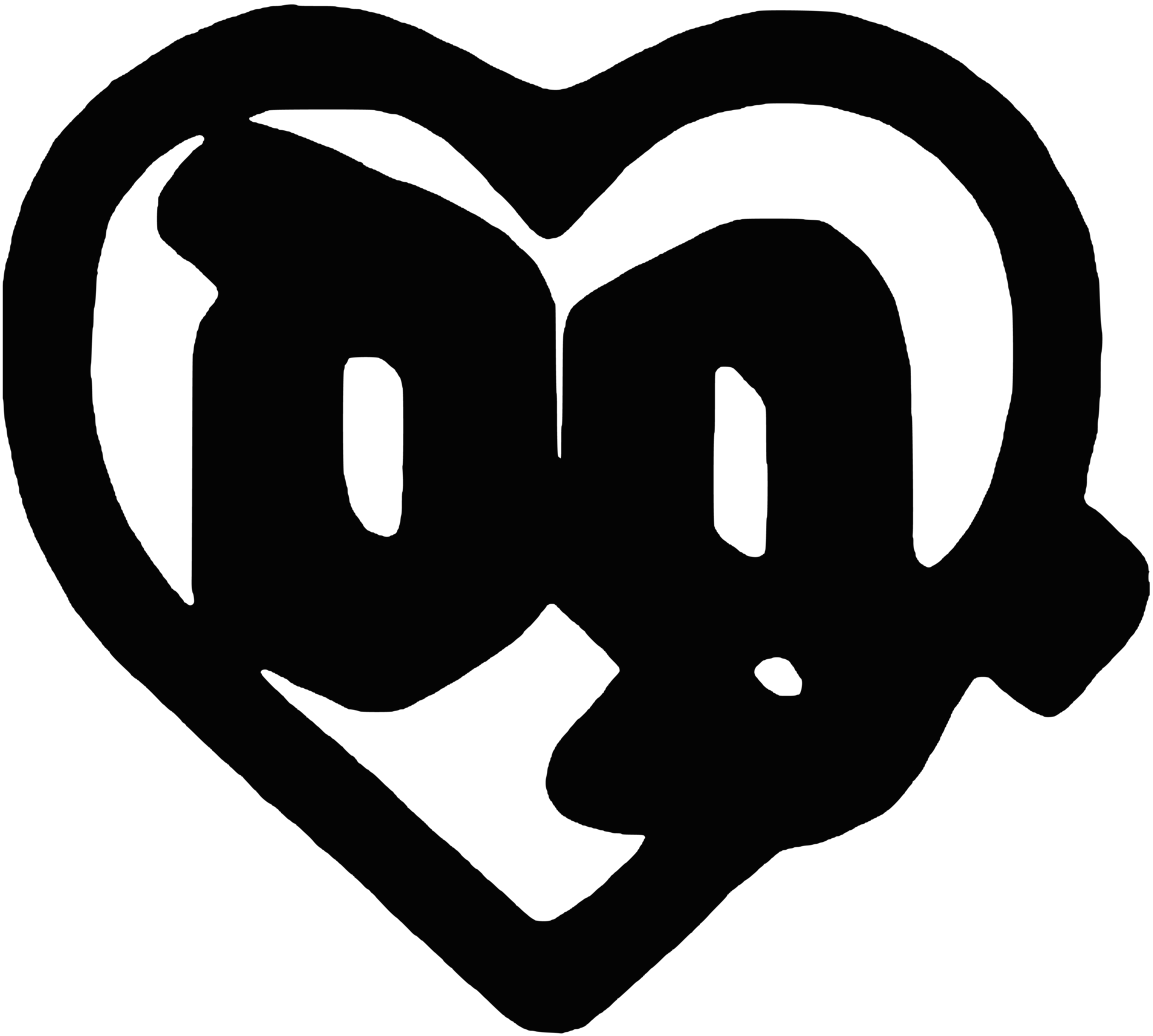
One of the logos associated with the Swedish collective Drain Gang, a central reference to digicore artists

The term "digicore" is a portmanteau of "digital" and "-core" (derived from hardcore), and originally appeared in the 2000s as a shortening for the genre "digital hardcore". In the late 2010s, an online community of teenage musicians, communicating through Discord, coined the modern usage of the term "digicore" to distinguish themselves from the preexisting hyperpop scene. The style was originally seen as a subgenre of hyperpop, though later described as developing alongside the movement.

Digicore draws influences from artists such as Bladee and his collective Drain Gang consisting of Ecco2k, Thaiboy Digital and producer Whitearmor, who inspired a form of online rap music called "draincore". In late 2019, artist lonelee, the founder of the record label teardrop digital, coined the modern usage of the term "digicore" to replace draincore, with Quinn being the first artist to be associated with the label. By 2021, "digicore" was further popularized by Billie Bugara's SoundCloud playlist of the same name.

== Characteristics ==
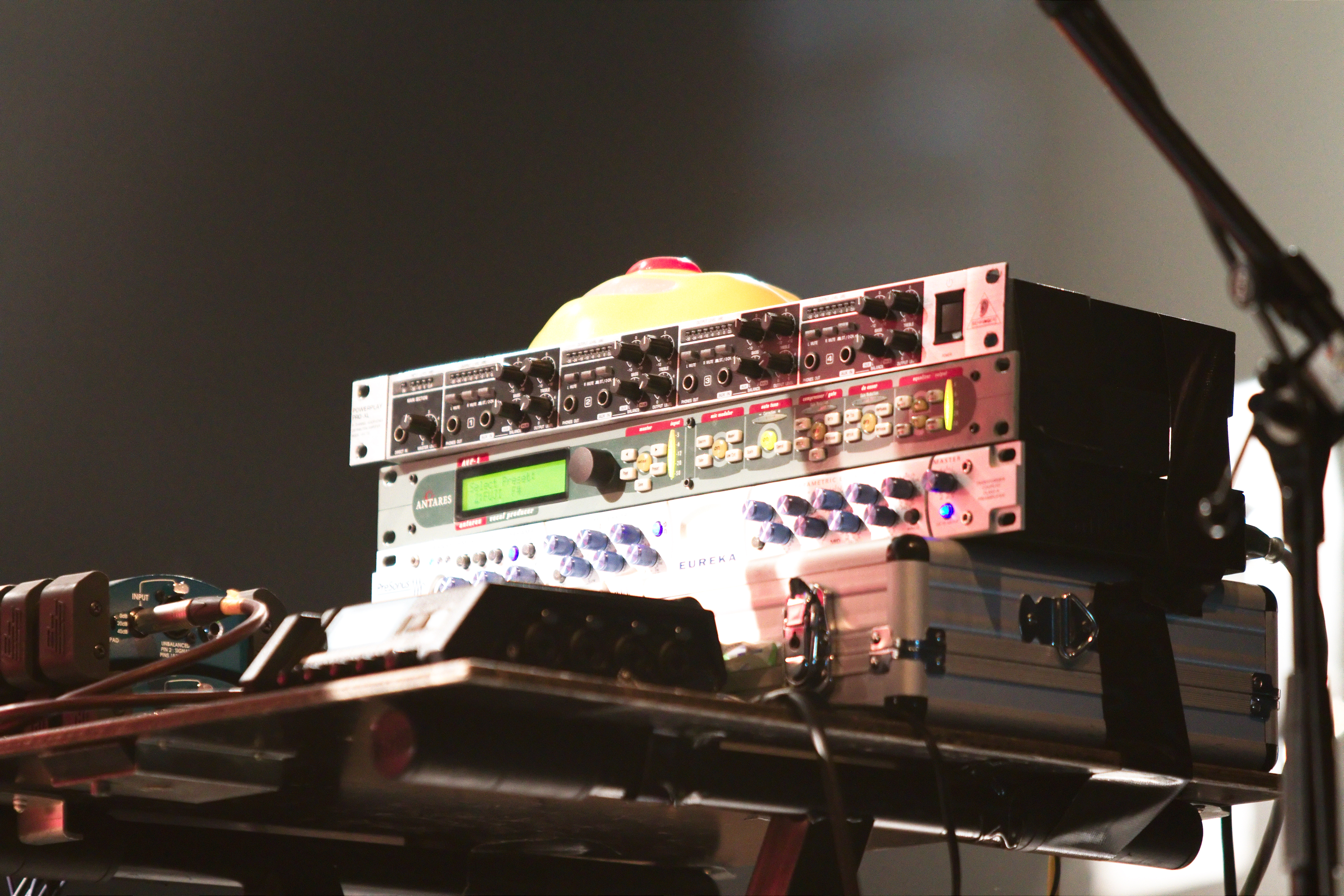
The use of Auto-Tune is a primary aspect of digicore. Photographed is the Antares Vocal Processor AVP-1.

Pioneering artists were typically between the ages of 15 to 18 at the microgenre's inception. Digicore differs from hyperpop mainly by its primary focus on trap-based influences but there remains a degree of crossover between the scenes. The genre is characterised by heavy autotune, layered melodies and instrumentation, high-pitched, breathy vocals, sing-rapping, sharp 808s, and frequent hi-hats. The use of autotune is a primary aspect as influenced by artists such as Bladee, which music journalist Kieran Press-Reynolds noted as a "central reference". Additionally, the style draws influences from genres such as nightcore.

Sheldon Pearce of NPR stated, that the style was frequently conflated with its "parent genre", hyperpop. Adding that, "Digicore is hyperpop, but hyperpop isn't necessarily digicore." Critics have also noted it as a subgenre of electronic music.

Music critic Kieran Press-Reynolds, writing for British magazine The Face, described digicore as "[...] shaped by the world of Discord servers, Minecraft, and the type of musical intuition that could only have been nurtured through years spent consuming YouTube beat tutorials and a cracked copy of FL Studio", as well as "capturing the angst of coming of age during a pandemic". Digicore artist d0llywood1 summarized the scene as "We're all digital kids who met each other on the internet and so make music that sounds like shit we found on the internet." According to Press-Reynolds, the term "glitchcore" would also initially be used synonymously with robloxcore and digicore.

Writer Billie Bugara describes that artists of the scene "pull from genres as wide-reaching as midwestern emo, trance, and even Chicago drill". Bugara defined digicore as simply "not Hyperpop and not Glitchcore". Artists also draw from genres such as Jersey club and Brazilian funk, as well as MySpace-era genres such as crunkcore. Other influences include the work of Duwap Kaine, BBY Goyard, Sybyr and Charli XCX. Artists Yungster Jack and David Shawty have been described as pioneers of the genre. BrooklynVegan credited the pair as "responsible for the SoundCloud scene's transition from emo rap to hyperpop".

Alongside, stylistic and aesthetic influences from internet memes and culture, internet aesthetics, old internet nostalgia, and online short-form content, with lyrics usually being introspective, depressive or ironic.

Similar to hyperpop, the digicore scene is often associated with the LGBTQ community, drawing primary influences from queer culture. Several key artists identify as gay, non-binary, or transgender. The microgenre's emphasis on vocal modulation has allowed artists to experiment with gender presentation and androgyny in their voices.

According to Rolling Stone magazine, collectives such as Novagang and Helix Tears "feature artists of variously different styles and sounds, but find community with each other in their shared rejection of stylistic limits."

== History ==
=== 2010s–2020s: Origins ===
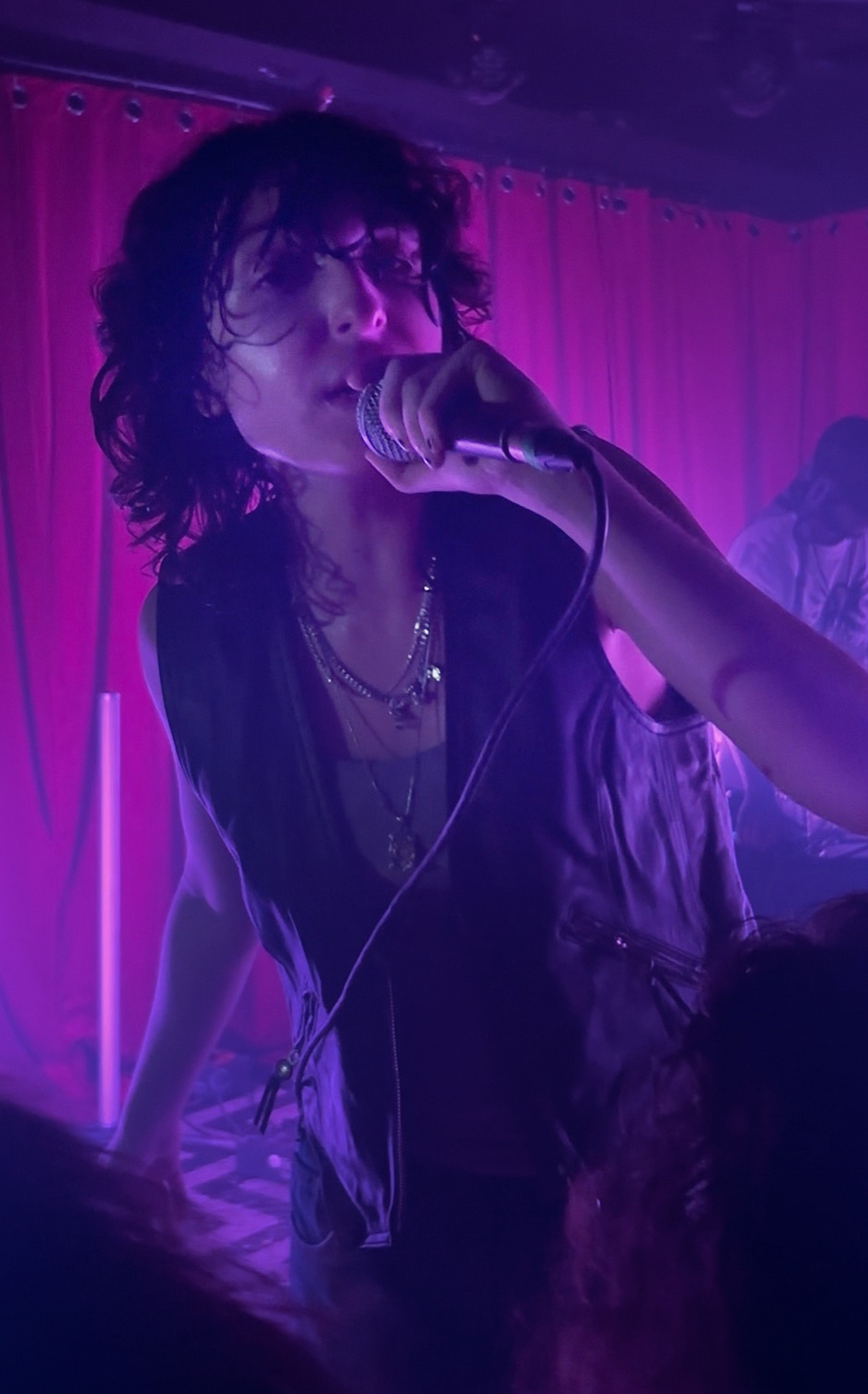
Jane Remover, photographed in April 2025, has been described as "the face of digicore".

In 2018, Dalton, a figure in the digicore scene, started a Minecraft and Discord server called "Loser's Club", which became a hub for several of the most popular artists within the digicore scene such as Quinn, Kmoe, Glaive, Ericdoa and Midwxst. These artists drew primary influence from Bladee and his collective Drain Gang, which inspired a microgenre known as "draincore". By 2019, the influence of the hyperpop duo 100 gecs, led the genre to be renamed "digicore", as a way to distinguish itself from the emerging hyperpop scene.

The early scene was centered around various SoundCloud collectives such as Helix Tears, Novagang, bloodhounds, slowsilver03, Varsity, Graveem1nd, Co-op and Goonncity. In 2020, the style saw a rise in popularity during the COVID-19 pandemic, with teenage artists who were out of school primarily making music during the lockdowns. According to British magazine The Face:

The pandemic forced 100 gecs to postpone their world tour twice, but it didn't stop their rise. During various lockdowns, the r/100gecs subreddit gained thousands of members, the band threw a fundraising festival inside Minecraft and they inspired a new generation of American producers to experiment with an intense genre – called either hyperpop or digicore – from their bedrooms.

Around that time, TikTok, particularly Alt TikTok, played a key role in popularising the scene, through video edits to two viral songs "NEVER MET!" by CMTEN and Glitch Gum and "Pressure" by Yungster Jack and David Shawty. In 2021, the digicore album Frailty by Jane Remover (who previously pioneered the dariacore microgenre) received praise on mainstream music sites Pitchfork and Paste, with the Fader stating the album established Jane Remover as "the face of digicore". Jane Remover has also been described as a "digicore pioneer" by the NME.

Writing for Pitchfork, music journalist Kieran Press-Reynolds featured several songs in a list titled "A Deeply Incomplete Canon of Hyperpop-Digicore", the list included Oaf1, Dreamcache, Valentine, Capoxxo, Twikipedia, Lei, Kurtains, I9bonsai, Kmoe, Brakence, D0llywood1, Quannnic, Dante Red, Angelus, Fortuneswan, Funeral, Blxty, Tropes. Other notable digicore artists include Lucy Bedroque.

Digicore would influence the development of several microgenres such as sigilkore, jerk, and hexd.

==== Diversification ====
The influence of the genre extended to other artists such as New York rapper Xaviersobased, who has been described as emerging out of the digicore scene through his early work. Additionally, rapper 2hollis draws influences from artists associated with digicore, but has since rejected the label. In 2022, he released a diss track on the genre entitled "Fuck digicore ass shit".

After the mainstream success of hyperpop in the early 2020s, many artists shifted toward digicore, either to avoid being categorized as hyperpop or because they felt the term better described their music. By 2024 and 2025, the digicore scene had further evolved, incorporating influences from rage music artists like Playboi Carti and Yeat. Revengeseekerz, the third studio album by Jane Remover was released in April 2025 and described as a cross-between rage and digicore. Additionally, rage artists such as Che and Prettifun have been described as drawing influence from digicore.

In 2025, Sheldon Pearce of NPR stated, "The post-100 gecs iterations of this music have assimilated rap as they have everything else, particularly mining the SoundCloud era of the 2010s, which is obviously foundational for many born in the 2000s".

Pitchfork stated that the laptop twee genre which drew from twee and indie pop, was at times associated with digicore, such as the song "love quest" by ASC.

In 2026, the publication No Bells published an article which cited rapper zayok as "the future of digicore". According to the Fader, Philadelphia rapper Slayr makes "heart-on-his-sleeve digicore".

== Collectives ==
=== Helix Tears ===
Helix Tears
- Official Helix Tears logo

Background information
- Origin: Ontario, Canada; United States
- Genres: Hyperpop; digicore
- Years active: 2018–present
- Members: Blackwinterwells, Quinn, chava, Noki, stef, Chach, Yurms, 8485, blxty, midwxst, d0llywood1, twikipedia, Kuru, quannnic and wstdyth

Helix Tears is an American-Canadian digicore collective formed in 2018 by Blackwinterwells. Notable members include Blackwinterwells, Twikipedia, Babs, 8485, Quinn, Quannnic, Kuru and Midwxst.

In April 2021, Alternative Press magazine labelled the collective as glitchcore, stating, "The blackwinterwells-led helix tears collective is SoundCloud's most exciting rabbit hole of glitchcore/hexD emo-rap transcendentalists". In an interview with Dazed magazine, rapper Midwxst stated, "Everyone in helix tears and NOVAGANG" were performing with "different styles, sounds, aesthetics and lives, but having a group of musically gifted people allows us to make music without boundaries."

=== Novagang ===
Novagang (stylized in uppercase) is an American digicore collective which was formed between 2018 and 2019 by artist Prblm. The group's name was a portmanteau between his alias "Nova" and "gang". According to New York magazine The Fader, artist Stef co-managed Novagang with Prblm. Stef disliked the term hyperpop to categorize the collective as the group had "a very eclectic sound". In 2022, the group released their debut collaborative album as a collective H.T.N.G. On August 6, 2023, they released their second collaborative album H.T.N.G. VOL 2: JUDGEMENT DAY. On August 19, they performed a sold-out show in New York City headlined by Osquinn and Xaviersobased. Other acts at the event included Exodus1900, Kasper Gem, Zootzie, Gv1nn and Strgurrl. The group had collaborated with artists such as Midwxst.

Writing for The Fader, music journalist Jordan Darville noted that "Prblm under the dj yzma alias, deconstructs modern music's obsession with pop-punk and so-called 'emo rap' into shards of spacious and compelling sound art." Darville added that Novagang provided a "freewheeling outsider's perspective to the world of experimental rap". Rapper Nettspend has been noted as finding support and community with "a group of rappers and beatmakers" associated with the group.

== Related genres ==
=== Glitchcore ===
Glitchcore
- Stylistic origins: Digicore; hyperpop; trap; emo rap; electronic; plugg; cloud rap; nightcore; pluggnb
- Cultural origins: Late 2010s to early 2020s; United States
- Typical instruments: Drum machine; autotune; synthesizer; pitch shifter; sampler; hi-hats

Other topics
- Internet rap; microgenre

Glitchcore is a microgenre that originally developed alongside hyperpop and digicore. Although glitchcore first appeared as a term in the breakcore scene, it later came to describe a style of music associated with the digicore scene. The 2020 single "Pressure" by Yungster Jack and David Shawty has been described as glitchcore. The style is characterized by the heavy use of audio effects such as autotune and pitch shifters, as well as rapidly chopped vocals designed to resemble audio glitches. Writing for Complex, music journalist Kieran Press-Reynolds described the techniques used by David Shawty on the song "Dancing on the Sidewalk Lights Flicker" as "the sounds of a rapper's voice spliced into fragments, placed in front of nearly every bar, like punctuation. 'D-d-d-d,' he warbles, his voice injected with a ludicrous amount of aural Botox (Auto-Tune, pitch shift)."

In 2022, 100 gecs would be labeled by The Face as inspiring "a new generation of American producers to experiment with an intense genre – called either hyperpop or digicore – from their bedrooms." As Kyann-Sian Williams of NME stated, "Now hyperpop has morphed into glitchcore, the latter defined by high-pitched vocals layered atop impaling 808s and wailing hi-hats that stop and start all over the place. Basically, glitchcore is hyperpop on steroids".

Glitchcore is sometimes conflated with hyperpop due to their similarities. In 2025, Sheldon Pearce of NPR stated, "glitchcore and digicore — terms often used interchangeably, only furthering confusion about what any of these words actually mean — and split into factions that in turn have bucked media narratives about what belongs where." Stef, a producer of the popular digicore and glitchcore collective Helix Tears stated that there certainly is a difference between hyperpop and glitchcore, saying, "Hyperpop is more melodic and poppy whereas glitchcore is indescribable".

According to Alternative Press magazine, American musician glaive is "Sometimes mislabeled as a glitchcore or hyperpop artist," further adding, "glaive doesn't glitch out his beats all that much or rely on PC-processing of his vocals".

==== Visual aesthetic ====
Additionally, glitchcore also developed a distinct internet visual aesthetic, that drew primary influence from glitch art, with videos featuring fast-paced, and cluttered edits, often colorful and occasionally marked with flash warnings. This visual style frequently made use of an editing technique known as "datamoshing." Digicore artists like d0llywood1 even refer to glitchcore as "an aesthetic, like the edits", rather than an actual music genre. Alt TikTok, played a key role in popularising glitchcore, through video edits to two viral glitchcore/digicore songs "NEVER MET!" by CMTEN and Glitch Gum and "Pressure" by David Shawty and Yungster Jack.

=== Robloxcore ===
Robloxcore is a microgenre that was pioneered in late 2020 by artists such as Lungskull and Lieu, both of whom began by uploading and "bypassing" music into the popular online game Roblox, with their songs "Foreign" and "Threat" gaining popularity online. The term "robloxcore" was initially synonymous with "glitchcore" and "digicore". The scene's popularity was attributed to TikTok as well as Roblox audiomaker games like DigitalAngels and CriminalViolence, with tracks like Yameii Online's "Baby My Phone," peaking at No. 2 on the Spotify Viral 50 in March 2021.

== See also ==
- Internet rap

== Bibliography ==
- McDonald, Glenn (2024). You Have Not Yet Heard Your Favourite Song: How Streaming Changes Music. Canbury Press. ISBN 978-1914487156.
