= Hyperpop =

Music genre

- Stylistic origins: Electronic; pop; dance; hip-hop; rock; crunkcore; avant-garde; bubblegum bass; nightcore
- Cultural origins: Early 2010s, United Kingdom
- Typical instruments: Drum machine; autotune; synthesizer; pitch shifter; sampler; hi-hats; noise
- Derivative forms: HexD; digicore; robloxcore; sigilkore; rage; dariacore; krushclub; hyper-rock

Subgenres
- Hyperfunk; hyperplugg

Regional scenes
- São Paulo, Brazil (Hyper mandelão)

Other topics
- Netlabels in Japan; PC Music; recession pop; alternative pop; avant-pop; art pop; experimental pop; dance-pop; electro-pop; pop culture; post-internet art; internet music; post-internet music

Hyperpop is an electronic music movement and loosely defined subgenre that originated in the early 2010s in the United Kingdom. It is characterised by an exaggerated or maximalist take on 21st century popular music tropes and typically integrates pop and avant-garde sensibilities while drawing on elements commonly found in electronic, rock, hip-hop, and dance music. The origins of hyperpop are primarily traced back to the output of English musician A. G. Cook's record label and art collective PC Music, with associated artists Sophie, GFOTY, Hayden Dunham, Hannah Diamond, and Charli XCX, helping to pioneer a musical style that was later known as "bubblegum bass".

In 2019, the genre experienced a rise in popularity with the virality of the song "Money Machine" by 100 Gecs, and was further proliferated by Spotify, whose employee Lizzy Szabo launched the influential "Hyperpop" playlist, after spotting the term "hyperpop" on the platform's metadata, which had previously been added by data analyst Glenn McDonald in 2018. Following this, the style gained wider popularity among Gen Z through social media platforms like TikTok, particularly on Alt TikTok, which boosted its exposure during the COVID-19 lockdowns. At the time, several contemporaneous styles such as digicore, glitchcore, and robloxcore were synonymous with the genre, while dariacore, hyperplugg and hyperfunk were associated with the movement by the press.

After hyperpop entered the mainstream in the early 2020s, the label was rejected by artists originally associated with the scene, which led to an overall decline in emerging musicians. Hyperpop's influence was endured in the development of online microgenres such as sigilkore, jerk, rage, hexD, and krushclub, alongside the rise of indie sleaze and the recession pop revival.

== Etymology ==
The earliest known use of the term "hyperpop" was made in October 1988 by writer Don Shewey in an article about the Scottish dream pop band Cocteau Twins, stating that England in the 1980s had "nurtured the simultaneous phenomena of hyperpop and antipop". In the late 2000s, the term "hyperpop" was sometimes used as a genre descriptor in the nightcore scene and later associated with the artists surrounding the London-based PC Music record label and art collective in the early 2010s.

In 2014, artist Holly Herndon used the term "hyper-pop" in an interview with Red Bull Music Academy, stating: "I think Tokyo sounds insane. I've been walking around and there's those bands that are advertising the clubs where you go and drink champagne with guys with crazy haircuts. They're playing with some hyper-pop music." By 2018, Spotify data analyst Glenn McDonald, responsible for the genre database Every Noise at Once, added the label "hyperpop" to the platform's metadata. McDonald stated that he first saw the term in 2014, in reference to PC Music, but he did not think of it as a "microgenre" until 2018.

== Characteristics ==
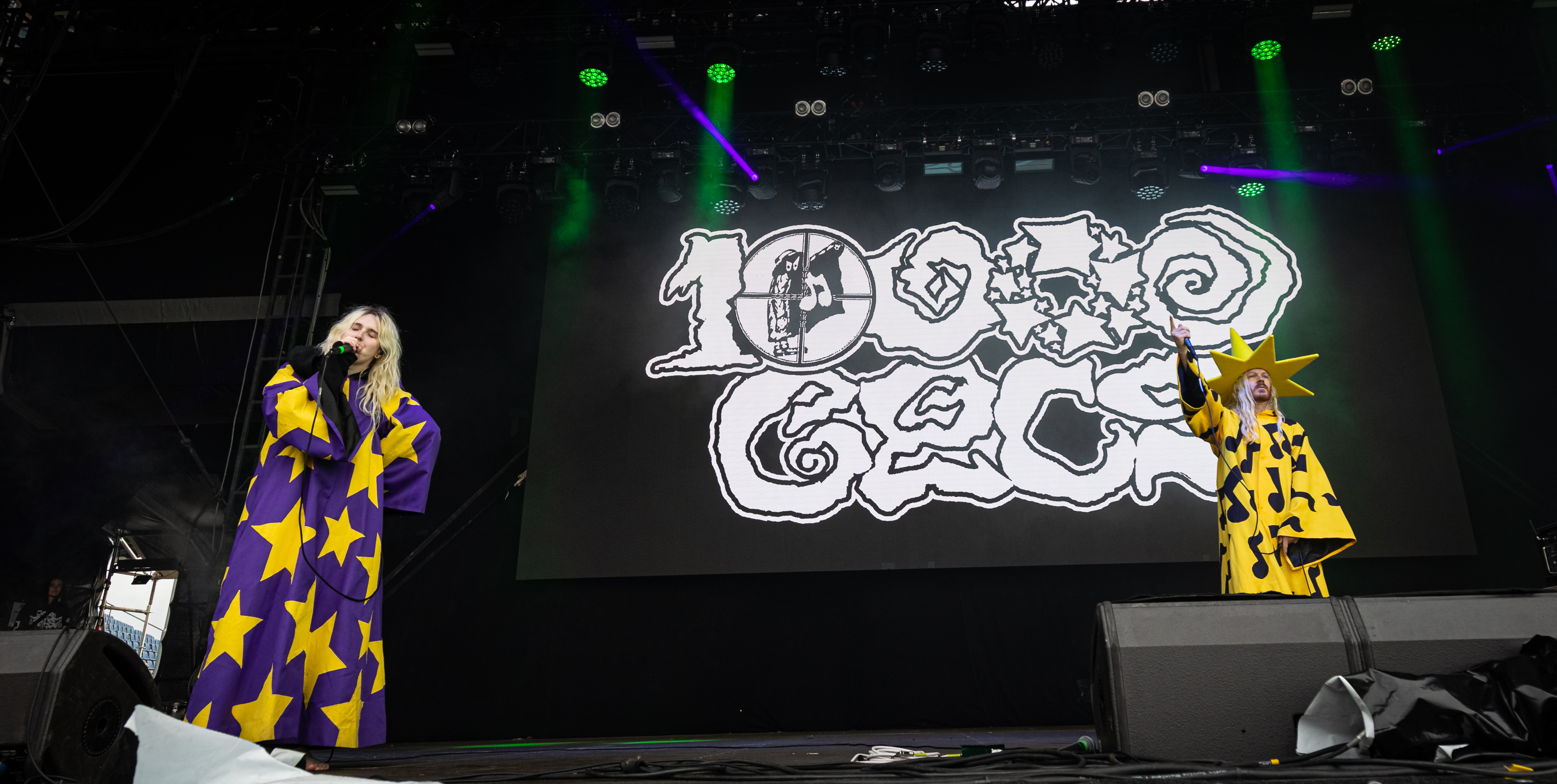
100 Gecs live at Rock am Ring 2022. The duo has been credited with popularizing hyperpop in the early 2020s.

Hyperpop artists embody an exaggerated, eclectic, and self-referential approach to pop music and typically employ elements such as brash synth melodies, Auto-Tuned "earworm" vocals, and excessive compression and distortion, as well as surrealist or nostalgic references to 2000s Internet culture and the Web 2.0 era. Common features include vocals that are heavily processed; metallic, melodic percussion sounds; pitch-shifted synths; catchy choruses; short song lengths; and "shiny, cutesy aesthetics" juxtaposed with angst-ridden or ironic lyricism.

According to Vice journalist Eli Enis, hyperpop is not so much about following music rules, but "a shared ethos of transcending genre altogether, while still operating within the context of pop". The movement is often associated with the LGBTQ+ community, drawing primary influences from queer culture. Several key artists identify as gay, non-binary, or transgender. The microgenre's emphasis on vocal modulation has allowed artists to experiment with gender presentation and androgyny in their voices, as well as deal with gender dysphoria. Artists like Sophie and 8485 explore themes of gender fluidity in their lyrical content.

The Wall Street Journal's Mark Richardson described hyperpop as turning the "artificial" parts of pop music up to an extreme level, creating a "cartoonish wall of noise" that is full of catchy tunes and memorable hooks. The music moves between beautiful and ugly, with shimmery melodies crashing into mangled instrumentals. Joe Vitagliano, writing for American Songwriter, said hyperpop is an "exciting, bombastic, and iconoclastic genre – if it can even be called a 'genre'" and has "saw synths, auto-tuned vocals, glitch-inspired percussion and a distinctive late-capitalism-dystopia vibe". According to Kieran Press-Reynolds writing for Pitchfork, artists in this style mix the avant-garde and pop music, often balancing between being addictively fun and a bit too much. He added that in 2024, hyperpop had become a "Frankensteinian macro-genre".

The Atlantic said the genre "swirls together and speeds up Top 40 tricks of present and past: a Janet Jackson drum slam here, a Depeche Mode synth squeal there, the overblown pep of novelty jingles throughout," but also said "the genre's zest for punk's brattiness, hip-hop's boastfulness, and metal's noise". Writer Sheldon Pearce of NPR stated that hyperpop "... has been a controversial catch-all for a blown-out music of excess and kitsch, unafraid of the abjectly cybernated or "lowbrow," seeking the sound of the dissociated online self."

According to Rolling Stone magazine, collectives such as Novagang and Helix Tears "feature artists of variously different styles and sounds, but find community with each other in their shared rejection of stylistic limits."

== Background ==
=== Precursors ===
Various artists acted as influential precursors to hyperpop, helping in shaping and developing the genre, as Will Pritchard of the Independent explains, "to some, the ground covered by hyperpop won't seem all that new". He mentioned "outliers" from the 2000s nu rave scene, like Test Icicles, and PC Music contemporaries Rustie and Hudson Mohawke as pursuing similar approaches; of the latter two artists, he noted that their "fluoro, trance-edged smooshes of dance and hip-hop are reminiscent of a lot of hyperpop today". Ian Cohen from Pitchfork claimed the term "hyperpop" was originally used to describe the music of Sleigh Bells. Followed by, AllMusic's Heather Phares claiming Sleigh Bells' music "foreshadowed hyperpop". Journalist Aliya Chaudhury believes 3OH!3 "created the main blueprint for hyperpop" with their "ability to parody pop and take it to bewildering extremes," using "blown-out synths, and modulated vocals". Other sources suggest the work of London musician Max Tundra as a direct influence on, and/or progenitor of, the hyperpop genre.

Additionally, mainstream pop artists such as Kesha were credited by writers like Eilish Gilligan from Junkee as influential precursors, writing: "[Kesha's] grating, half-spoken vocal featured in Blow and all of her early work, in fact, feel reminiscent of a lot of the intense vocals in hyperpop today". This was followed by a mention of Britney Spears, stating: "2011 dancefloor fillers 'Till The World Ends', 'Hold It Against Me' and 'I Wanna Go' all share the same pounding beats that populate modern hyperpop". Critics also consider M.I.A.'s third studio album /\/\ /\ Y /\ (2010) to be an early precursor of the genre.

=== Influences ===
Hyperpop initially emerged from the artists surrounding the PC Music record label and art collective in London and was inspired by bubblegum pop, Eurohouse, hip-hop, trance, J-pop, K-pop, emo, and nu-metal, alongside crunkcore, nu metal, and metalcore. Originally, the term was used to refer to specific musicians in the nightcore scene and many acts, such as A.G. Cook and 100 gecs took influence from nightcore, particularly the fast paced production and pitch-shifted vocals.

The genre later incorporated broader influences during its second wave in the late 2010s, drawing influence from contemporary meme and internet culture, as well as production and musical styles lifted from traditional and contemporary hip-hop like emo rap, cloud rap and lo-fi trap, contemporaneous movements like digicore and glitchcore became primary influences, as both scenes were sometimes conflated with hyperpop due to overlapping artists.

== History ==
=== 2010s: Origins ===
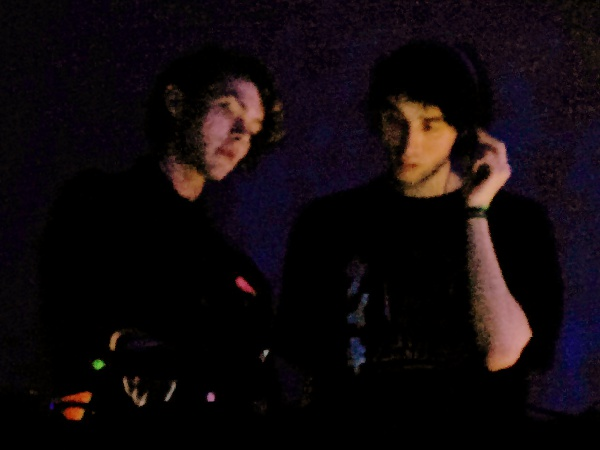
British musicians Sophie (left) and A. G. Cook (right) are considered progenitors of hyperpop

Hyperpop originally emerged from the PC Music record label and art collective in the early 2010s. Spotify editor Lizzy Szabo referred to A. G. Cook as the "godfather" of hyperpop. According to Enis, PC Music "laid the groundwork for [the microgenre's] melodic exuberance and cartoonish production", with some of hyperpop's surrealist qualities also derived from 2010s hip hop. She states that hyperpop built on the influence of PC Music, but also incorporated the sounds of emo rap, cloud rap, trap, trance, dubstep and chiptune. Among Cook's frequent collaborators, Variety and The New York Times described the work of Sophie as pioneering the style, while Charli XCX was described as "queen" of the style by Vice, her 2016 EP Vroom Vroom and 2017 mixtape Pop 2 set a template for its sound, featuring "outré" production by AG Cook, Sophie, Umru, and Easyfun as well as "a titular mission to give pop – sonically, spiritually, aesthetically – a facelift for the modern age". Sophie Walker of The Forty-Five named Sophie's 2018 song "Immaterial" the best hyperpop song of all time, stating that "hyperpop is nothing without Sophie".

=== Late 2010s–2020s: First wave ===
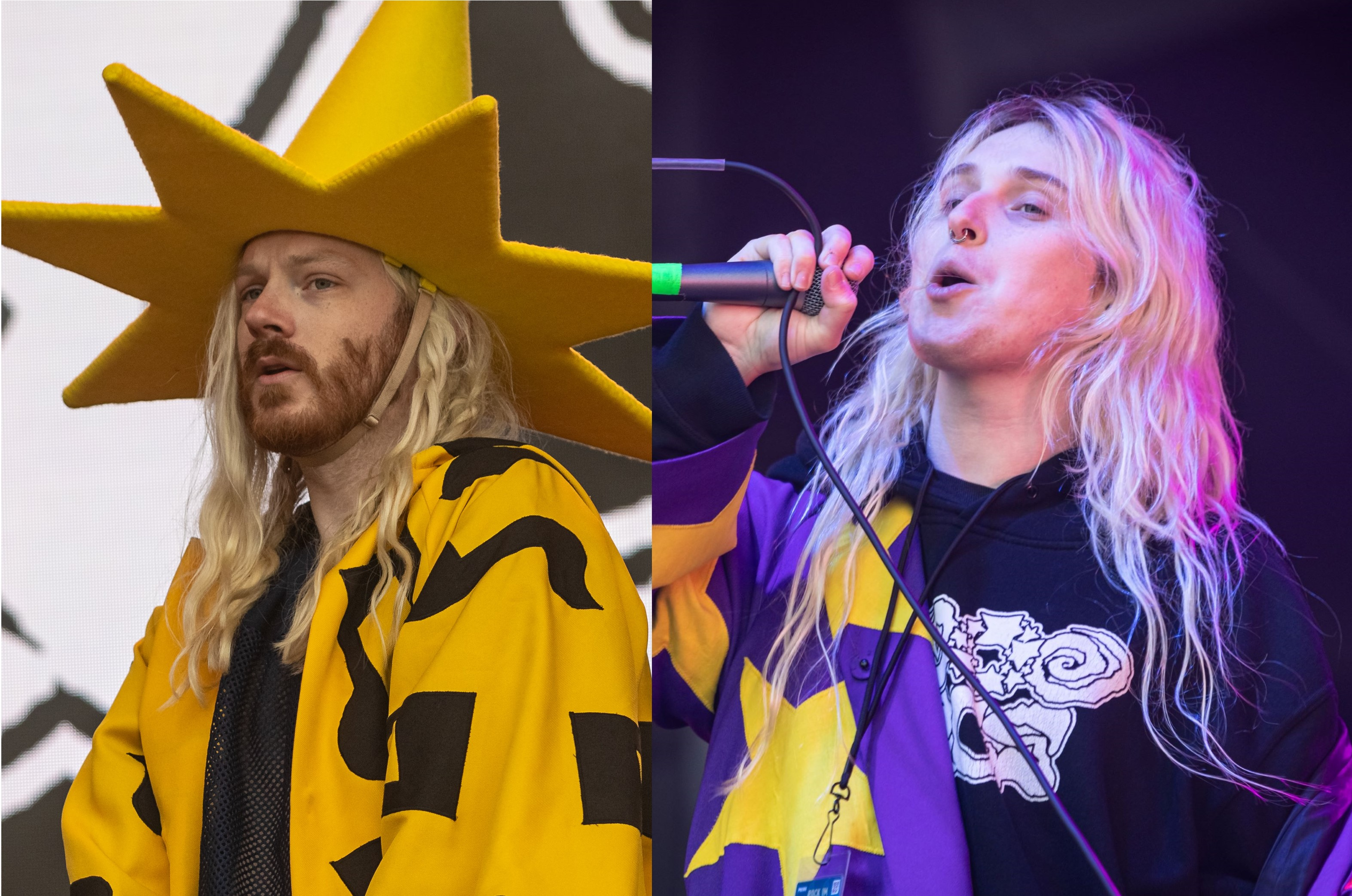
In 2019, the popularity of 100 Gecs and their debut album led to Spotify launching a dedicated permanent hyperpop playlist.

According to Vice and the Face, a second wave of hyperpop following the original PC Music scene emerged in 2019, spearheaded by hyperpop duo 100 Gecs, whose viral hit "Money Machine" helped reinvent and popularize the genre. In May 2019, they released their debut album 1000 Gecs, which amassed millions of listens on streaming services. The Independent described 100 gecs as taking hyperpop, "to its most extreme, and extremely catchy, conclusions: stadium-sized trap beats processed and distorted to near-destruction, overwrought emo vocals and cascades of ravey arpeggios". In August 2019, Spotify launched the "Hyperpop" playlist, led by senior editor, Lizzy Szabo, which later featured guest curation from 100 Gecs and others in the scene, helping to further popularize the microgenre. Other artists featured on the playlist included AG Cook, Popstar Patch, Slayyyter, Gupi, Caroline Polachek, Hannah Diamond, and Kim Petras. Szabo and her colleagues landed on the name for the playlist after stumbling upon it on the platform's metadata, which drew from the site Every Noise at Once, ran by data analyst and Spotify employee Glenn McDonald, who was credited with adding the term in 2018. In November, Cook added non-hyperpop artists such as J Dilla, Nicki Minaj, Lil Uzi Vert and Kate Bush to the playlist, which caused controversy due to these additions pushing out smaller hyperpop artists who relied upon the playlist for their earnings. In addition, David Turner, a former strategy manager at SoundCloud, noted a "spike in March and April 2020 from new creators," on the platform, many of which were making hyperpop-adjacent music.

In 2020, the microgenre began to see a greater rise in popularity, which was linked to the COVID-19 lockdowns, albums like Charli XCX's how i'm feeling now (2020) and A.G. Cook's Apple (2020) appeared on critics' 2020 end-of-year lists, while the movement saw a broader cultural influence amongst Gen Z on social media platforms like TikTok, particularly "Alt TikTok", which Rolling Stone described as "one of the main countercultures on the app". On September 25, 2020, Pitchfork cited Alt TikTok as having an influence on wider music trends, stating: "Alt TikTok's music is now a hot zone for major record labels, pushing it even further into the mainstream". Pitchfork noted that musician Ayesha Erotica's work had become popular on TikTok, while every "hyperpop explainer" video was met with comments regarding the erasure of her influence on the genre. In July 2021, Hyperpop artist ElyOtto's song "SugarCrash!" became one of the most popular songs in TikTok history, and was used in over 5 million videos on the platform.

In August 2021, Charli XCX made a post on Twitter, asking "rip hyperpop? discuss". Following this, Dazed noted that since 2019, the term 'hyperpop' "had become a catch-all phrase for any and all forms of extreme pop music," and that "sonically, you'd be hard pressed to find any internet-born music made in the last decade that hasn't been retroactively brandished as hyperpop", also stating that "almost all of those given the label have grown disillusioned with the term, or grown irritated by its constraints". That same year, prominent hyperpop musician Glaive stated that he and Ericdoa were "working on killing" the movement, though three months later stated that it "will never die". Underscores, another significant contributor to the microgenre, stated that it was "officially dead". Other sources cited online streaming algorithms as pigeon-holing the genre into conventions that led to a decline in further developments and innovation.

During the pandemic, Los Angeles-based virtual "hyperpop raves", simply entitled "Subculture", gained prominence through six-hour long "Zoom parties", welcoming over 1,000 guests at its peak and later hosting raves in cities across the United States after the end of the COVID-19 lockdowns. In 2023, the raves gained attention from Rolling Stone for its mix of PC Music artists and others under the hyperpop umbrella, including rap-influenced artists from SoundCloud, as well as its significant LGBTQ inclusion, with the raves operating as useful networking events. Subculture organizers Gannon Baxter and Tyler Shepherd expressed mixed feelings about their use of the term "hyperpop", but Shepherd stated that it was "just a tool to quickly convey what realm of music we're talking about". In June 2023, PC Music announced that the label would no longer be releasing any new music, instead focusing on archival projects and special reissues.

==== Charli XCX and mainstream popularity ====
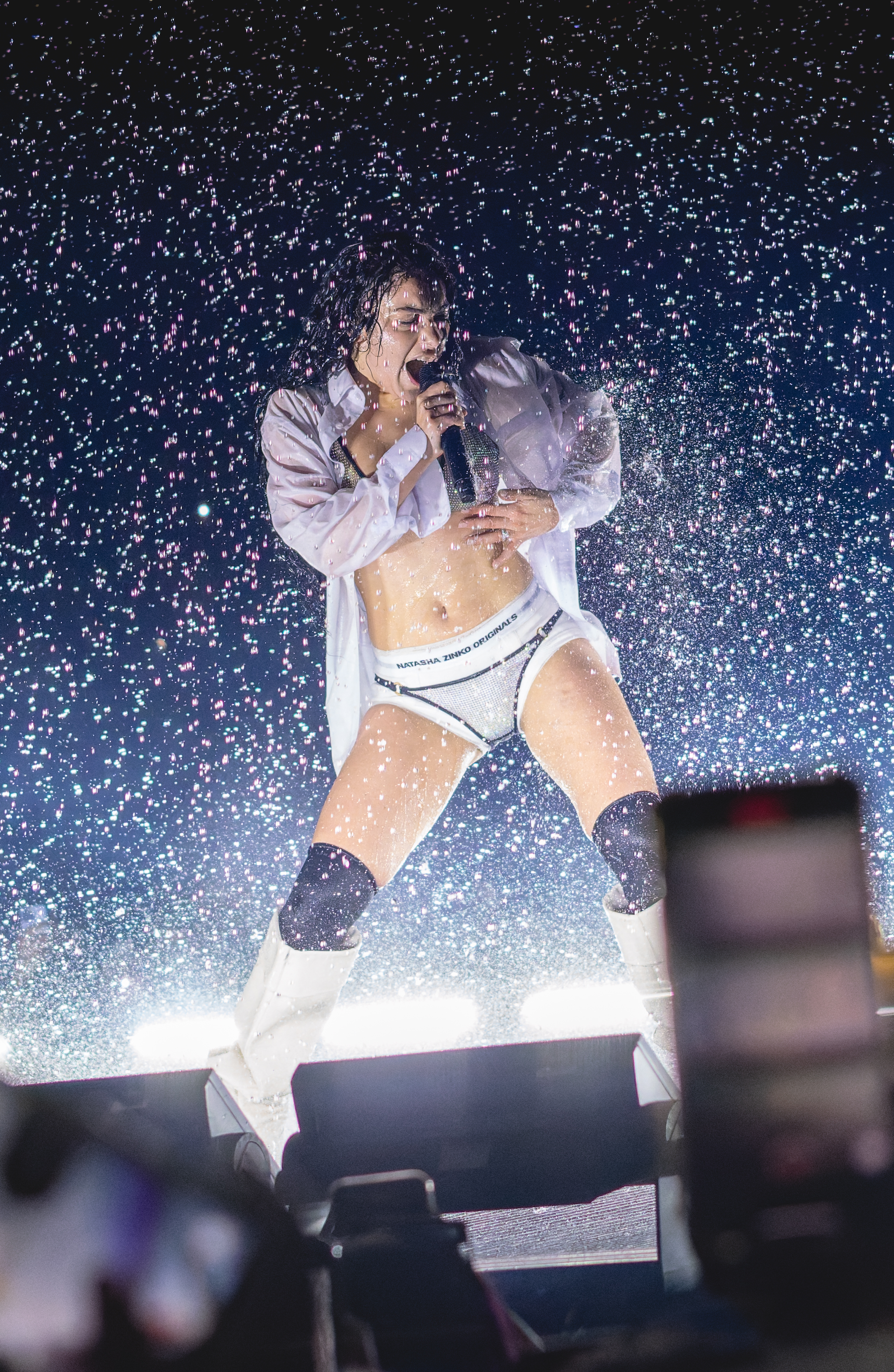
Charli XCX performing during the Brat Tour in November 2024

Charli XCX's 2024 album Brat brought the genre to a wider audience. The Billboard Hot 100 No. 1 single "Unholy" by Sam Smith and Kim Petras also contained hyperpop influences.

Noting the apparent contradiction between the extensive influence of hyperpop on other genres and its lack of stars, Kieran Press-Reynolds wrote in Pitchfork that other pioneering artists in the scene had not gained any commercial success since its initial rise due to "conflicting visions of its practitioners, the lifting of the pandemic lockdown, and the fact that some of its most promising musicians didn't want fame and actively recoiled from it".

On September 17, 2024, Google displayed a Google Doodle paying tribute to hyperpop pioneer, Sophie, on her birthday. In 2025, Google also displayed a Google Doodle celebrating the hyperpop genre for pride month.

=== Regional scenes ===
Nylon's Ben Jolley cited Putochinomaricón as one of the "biggest names in the scene".

Hyperpop also began to spread in Asia, starting in the early 2020's. Artists Effie and 4s4ki have been named as influential in the scene by publications Billboard and Dazed.

== Related genres ==
=== Bubblegum bass ===
Bubblegum bass (also known as PC music) is an experimental style of electronic music associated with the British record label and art collective PC Music, founded by A. G. Cook in London in 2013. The style draws influences from 1990s and 2000s electronic music scenes, the early internet, and bloghouse-related genres. It has been credited as hyperpop's first "era" by Pitchfork, as well as establishing the sound that would later "morph into hyperpop". Notable artists include Hannah Diamond, GFOTY, A. G. Cook, and SOPHIE who made releases on the PC Music label.

=== Digicore ===
Digicore (originally known as draincore) is a microgenre that developed alongside hyperpop (sometimes characterised as a subgenre) during the late 2010s to early 2020s. The term was adopted in 2019 by an online community of teenage musicians, communicating through Discord, to distinguish themselves from the preexisting hyperpop scene. The microgenre saw a rise in popularity during the COVID-19 pandemic. It differs from hyperpop mainly by adding trap-based influences, but there remains a degree of crossover between the scenes—characterised by heavy autotune, high-pitched vocals, sharp 808s, and frequent hi-hats.

Digicore artist Billie Bugara wrote that her colleagues "pull from genres as wide-reaching as midwestern emo, trance, and even Chicago drill". The beginnings of digicore are rooted in internet culture and many popular producers from the microgenre are between the ages of 15 and 18. Artists Yungster Jack and David Shawty have been described as pioneers of the genre.

=== Glitchcore ===
Glitchcore is a microgenre that originally developed alongside hyperpop and digicore (sometimes characterised as a subgenre of both styles), is often characterised by the heavy use of audio effects such as autotune and pitch shifters, as well as rapidly chopped vocals designed to resemble audio glitches. Originally pioneered by Yungster Jack and David Shawty. As Kyann-Sian Williams of NME stated, "glitchcore is hyperpop on steroids", referring to the exaggerated vocals, distortions, glitch noises, and other pop elements present within glitchcore. Artists such as 100 gecs, Bladee and his collective Drain Gang played a key role in the development of the genre.

Stef, a producer of the popular hyperpop and glitchcore collective Helix Tears stated that there certainly is a difference between the two microgenres, saying, "Hyperpop is more melodic and poppy whereas glitchcore is indescribable". Glitchcore is typically made up of artists that share stylistic similarities to 100 gecs, rather than the musicians signed to PC Music.

TikTok played a key role in popularising glitchcore, through video edits to two viral glitchcore songs "NEVER MET!" by CMTEN and Glitch Gum and "Pressure" by David Shawty and Yungster Jack. Additionally, glitchcore also developed a distinct internet visual aesthetic with videos featuring glitchy, fast-paced, and cluttered edits, often colorful and occasionally marked with flash warnings. This visual style frequently made use of an editing technique known as "datamoshing". Digicore artists like d0llywood1 even refer to glitchcore as "an aesthetic, like the edits", rather than an actual music genre.

=== Dariacore ===
Dariacore (also known as hyperflip) is an Internet microgenre of electronic dance music. It is sometimes conflated as a subgenre of hyperpop. The term was coined by Jane Remover following their 2021 album Dariacore and its two sequels: Dariacore 2: Enter Here, Hell to the Left and Dariacore 3... At Least I Think That's What It's Called? The microgenre gained popularity on SoundCloud in 2021 and 2022, characterized by sped up and pitch-shifted samples from pop music and other popular media, primarily drawing influences from breakbeats and Jersey club. It was described by Raphael Helfand of the Fader as "an entire genre in and of itself, taking hyperpop's silliest tendencies to their logical conclusions".

By the mid-2020s, Dariacore had gained a cult following in Japan through the netlabel Lost Frog Productions. Founder Haruo Ishihara attributes the style's popularity in Japan partly to the country's established song remix and OtoMAD meme culture, as well as the frequent sampling of familiar anime and J-pop hits.

=== Hyper-rock ===
Hyper-rock is a fusion genre that fuses rock music and hyperpop. It is characterized by a guitar-centric foundation combined with processed vocals, glitchy textures, and experimental sound design, resulting in a sound that differs from folktronica, indietronica, or digital hardcore. The term hyper-rock was coined by Stereogum journalist James Rettig. He introduced the term in a "tongue-in-cheek parenthetical" while reviewing Feeble Little Horse's album, Girl with Fish.

Hyper-rock, as a distinct musical style, is considered to have emerged in the late 2010s and early 2020s, although its foundational elements and experimental precursors date back further. Early sonic experiments in the 2000s laid the groundwork for the genre. Known forerunners include Sweet Trip's Velocity : Design : Comfort (2003) is considered a significant record for the genre, blending IDM, glitch, and shoegaze. Tracks such as "Fruitcake and Cookies" and "To All the Dancers of the World, a Round Form of Fantasy" illustrate the progression from fragmented electronic textures to euphoric, guitar-driven soundscapes, elements later associated with hyper-rock.

Hyper-rock is primarily built around rock guitars, which may range from dense, reverb-soaked layers reminiscent of shoegaze to harsher, evolving riffs influenced by black metal. Vocals are often heavily processed, employing techniques such as pitch shifting and the use of Auto-Tune. The style also incorporates glitched-out production and electronic elements, including programmed drums, synth textures, and fragmented soundscapes. The genre reflects a fusion of influences from a wide array of musical styles. Shoegaze contributes atmospheric textures and layered guitar sounds, while hyperpop informs its high-energy, glitch-oriented approach and vocal processing. IDM, glitch, and digicore provide jittery electronic elements and fragmented sound design. Some artists integrate aspects of heavy metal, trance, electronic dance, vaporwave, and pop.

== See also ==
- Avant-pop
- Poptimism
- Postmodern music
- Pop culture
