= By Storm =

American hip-hop duo

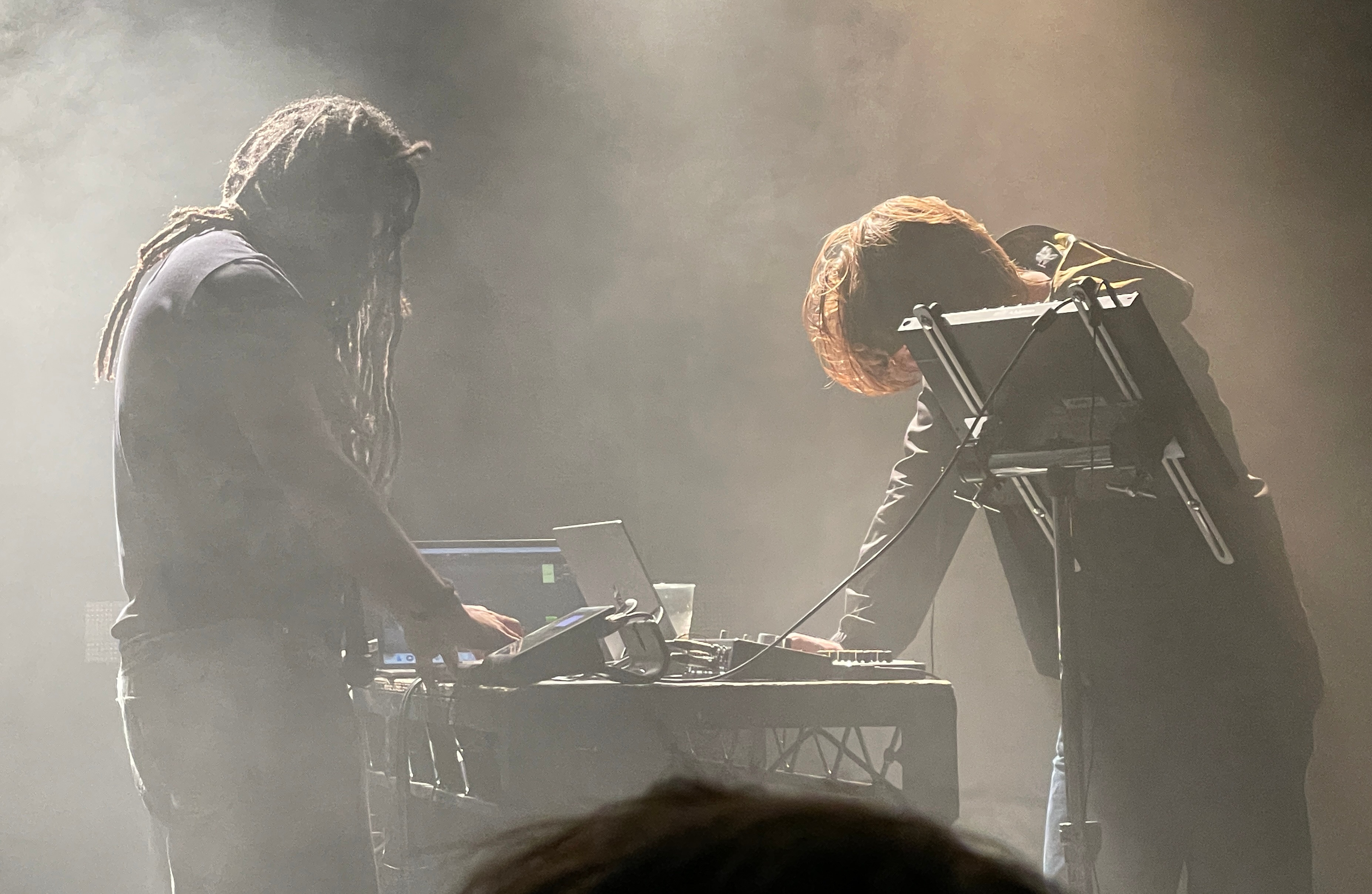
- RiTchie and Corey performing in 2026

Background information
- Origin: Tempe, Arizona
- Genres: Experimental hip-hop; alternative hip-hop; jazz rap; abstract hip-hop
- Years active: 2023–present
- Labels: By(e) Storm; DeadAir
- Spinoff of: Injury Reserve
- Members: RiTchie; Parker Corey
- Website: by-storm.net

By Storm are an American experimental hip-hop duo consisting of rapper Nathaniel "RiTchie" Ritchie and producer Parker Corey. From 2012 to 2023, Ritchie and Corey were members of Tempe-based trio Injury Reserve alongside rapper Stepa J. Groggs. Following Groggs' death and the release of their final album By the Time I Get to Phoenix (2021), Ritchie and Corey regrouped as a duo under the name By Storm.

Following a string of singles, their debut album, My Ghosts Go Ghost was released on January 30, 2026 to critical acclaim.

== History ==
=== 2012–2023: Injury Reserve ===
Injury Reserve was a hip-hop group initially formed as a duo by rappers Ritchie with a T and Stepa J. Groggs in Tempe, Arizona. By 2015, the group had added producer Parker Corey and self-released their debut mixtape Live from the Dentist Office. Through 2018, they released the mixtape Floss and EP Drive It Like It's Stolen and signed to Loma Vista Recordings. Their debut album, Injury Reserve was released through Loma Vista in 2019.

Groggs died on June 29, 2020, at age 32. Following Groggs' death, Ritchie and Corey finished and independently released their second and final studio album, By the Time I Get to Phoenix (2021), featuring posthumous appearances by Groggs. In an interview with Huck Magazine, interviewer Thomas Hobbs asked Ritchie with a T if the group could continue without Groggs. Ritchie responded: "I can imagine [Groggs] joking and saying: 'Y'all better still do this shit!'. But then I can also imagine him saying: 'You better not step on a stage without me!'. We're still figuring it out... We've not had an explicit conversation about continuing the group, but me and Parker will continue to create together [in some capacity]."

=== 2023–2024: Formation ===
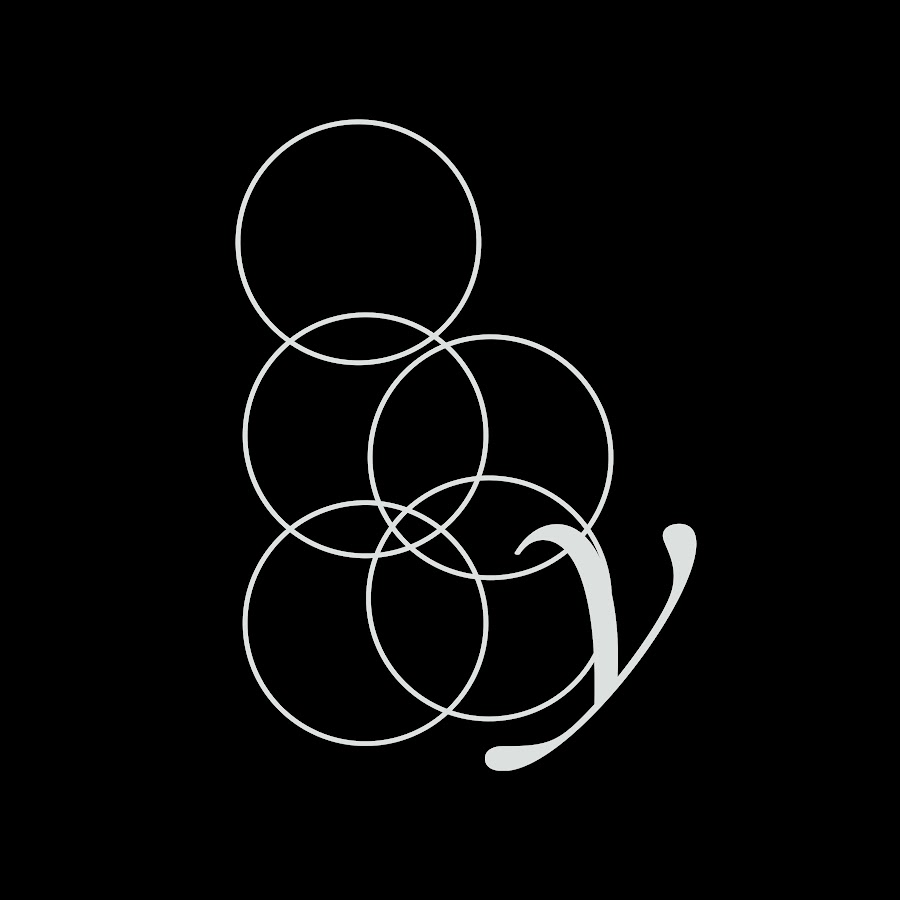
By Storm's logo, officially revealed in 2024

On July 6, 2023, Ritchie and Corey officially regrouped under the name By Storm, a reference to the final track on By The Time I Get to Phoenix, "Bye Storm". On August 1st, "Bye Storm" was re-released in a double single alongside By Storm's debut single "Double Trio", alongside an accompanying music video.

In April 2024, Ritchie released his debut solo album, Triple Digits [112], under his new stage name RiTchie. That September, he released the collaborative EP Quiet Warp Xpress with FearDorian.

=== 2025–present: My Ghosts Go Ghost ===
On February 26, 2025, By Storm released their second single, "Zig Zag". The seven-minute single was accompanied by a 52 minute release including new verses, remixes, and instrumentation. On April 3, they followed up with "Double Trio 2", alongside a music video directed by Corey.

Throughout 2025, the duo tested new material during shows in Phoenix, London, Los Angeles, and New York City, using audience reactions to inform their upcoming album.

On January 15, 2026, the duo announced their debut studio album, My Ghosts Go Ghost, alongside the release of a final single "And I Dance", once again alongside a Corey-directed music video. My Ghosts Go Ghost was released on January 30, 2026, via DeadAir, to critical acclaim.

== Members ==
- RiTchie - vocals (2023-present)
- Parker Corey - production (2023-present)

== Discography ==
=== Studio albums ===
Title	Album details
My Ghosts Go Ghost	Release: January 30, 2026; Label: DeadAir; Format: Digital download, vinyl, CD, streaming

=== Singles ===
Title	Year	Album
"Double Trio"	2023	Non-album single
"Zig Zag"	2025	My Ghosts Go Ghost
"Double Trio 2"	2025	My Ghosts Go Ghost
"In My Town"	2025	My Ghosts Go Ghost
"And I Dance"	2026	My Ghosts Go Ghost
