= Injury Reserve =

American hip-hop group

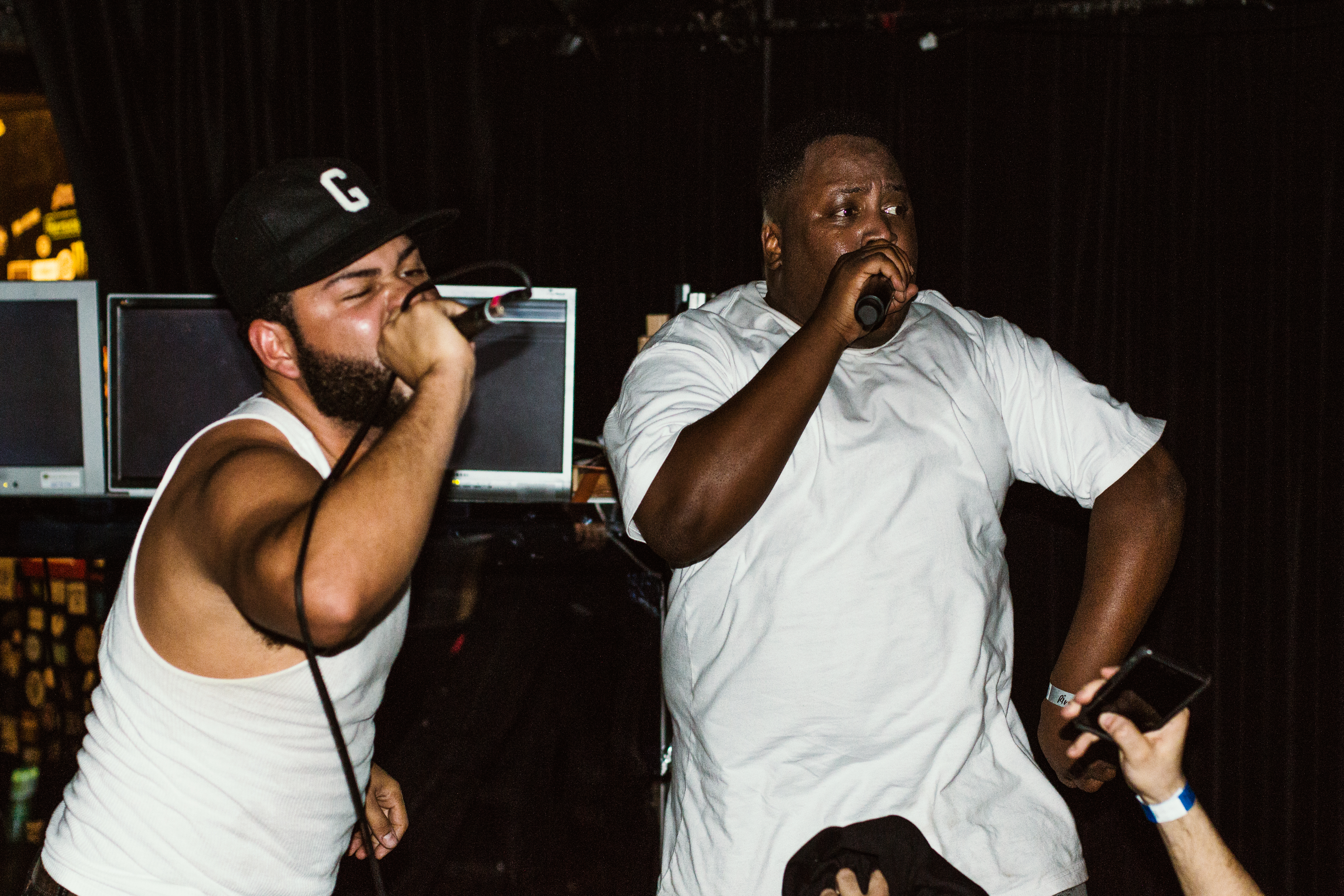
- Ritchie with a T (left) and Stepa J. Groggs (right) performing in 2018; Not pictured: Parker Corey

Background information
- Origin: Tempe, Arizona, U.S.
- Genres: Alternative hip-hop; jazz rap; experimental hip-hop; abstract hip-hop
- Years active: 2012–2023
- Labels: Las Fuegas; Loma Vista; Seneca Village
- Spinoffs: By Storm
- Past members: Ritchie with a T Stepa J. Groggs; Parker Corey
- Website: injuryreserve.online

Injury Reserve was an American hip-hop group founded in Tempe, Arizona, in 2012. The group consisted of rappers Ritchie with a T and Stepa J. Groggs, alongside producer Parker Corey.

In 2015, the group self-released their breakout mixtape, Live from the Dentist Office, to critical acclaim. In 2016, the group released another mixtape, Floss, to further acclaim. Both mixtapes were recorded in a dentist office that belonged to Corey's grandfather. After relocating to Los Angeles in 2017, the group released an EP, Drive It Like It's Stolen, to generally positive reception. The next year, they signed to Loma Vista Recordings for their debut studio album, Injury Reserve, which released in 2019. While their earlier mixtapes were influenced by jazz rap, the group's sound gradually became more industrial and glitch oriented.

In June 2020, while recording their second album, Groggs died, aged 32. Throughout 2020, Ritchie and Corey completed the remainder of the album. The group self-released their final album, By the Time I Get to Phoenix, in 2021. The remaining members regrouped as By Storm in 2023.

== History ==
=== 2012–2014: Formation, Depth Chart and Cooler Colors ===
Injury Reserve was initially formed as a duo in late 2012 by rappers Jordan "Stepa J." Groggs and Nathaniel Ritchie, also known as Ritchie with a T. Ritchie first met Groggs as a child through his mother, who managed the Vans store Groggs was employed at in Phoenix. Ritchie later met eventual member Parker Corey through a mutual acquaintance in high school, and the two began collaborating on Ritchie's solo debut, Days Slow Nights Fast, in early 2012, with Corey serving as executive producer. Groggs appeared on the mixtape as a featured artist, and the two rappers would begin work on a collaborative full length together, with Corey again serving as executive producer.

On January 16, 2013, the duo released their debut standalone single, "Electric Relaxation," on YouTube, accompanied by a music video.

On March 6, 2013, the duo released "On Point", which served as the lead single to their debut mixtape, Depth Chart, which was executive produced by Parker Corey. Another single, "Growing Down," followed on March 15, 2013. The mixtape was released on March 27, 2013 to little fanfare or media attention. It was initially billed as Injury Reserve's debut album, but the group no longer acknowledges it as such. It was released through digital platforms such as Audiomack, but was delisted after the subsequent media attention from 2015's Live from the Dentist Office. Corey would later join Injury Reserve as the group's producer on April 26, 2013.

In 2014, the now-trio released Cooler Colors, a 7-track EP, led by singles, "Black Sheep", "Groundhog Day", and "How Bout You". It was released through digital platforms such as Audiomack, but was delisted in the same fashion as Depth Chart. The group doesn't refer to these projects as their debuts, and instead refers to Live from the Dentist Office as their debut.

Cooler Colors was mostly us trying to replicate our favorite artists, and we found that really corny. When me and Parker critique people, we'll say "Oh that guy sounds like this guy" and then we were realized we're total hypocrites. Live from the Dentist was us finding our own sound, and that's why we call that the first actual Injury Reserve project, because the music's original and it gets at our personalities.

— Ritchie with a T, in a 2016 interview with The Daily Texan

=== 2015–2016: Live from the Dentist Office and Floss ===
In 2015, the group self-released Live from the Dentist Office, their 11-track breakout mixtape with features from Chuck Inglish, Curtis Williams, Glass Popcorn, and Demi Hughes. The mixtape was released through multiple digital platforms such as SoundCloud, iTunes, Tidal, and Spotify. Physical copies of the project were later sold through Injury Reserve's online store. Live from the Dentist Office generally received acclaim from music critics.

On December 15, 2016, Injury Reserve released their third mixtape titled Floss, released again through a variety of digital platforms to similar acclaim. The mixtape featured Vic Mensa and Cakes da Killa. Both projects were actually recorded in a dental office belonging to producer Parker Corey's grandfather.

=== 2017–2019: Drive It Like It's Stolen, signing to Loma Vista, Injury Reserve ===
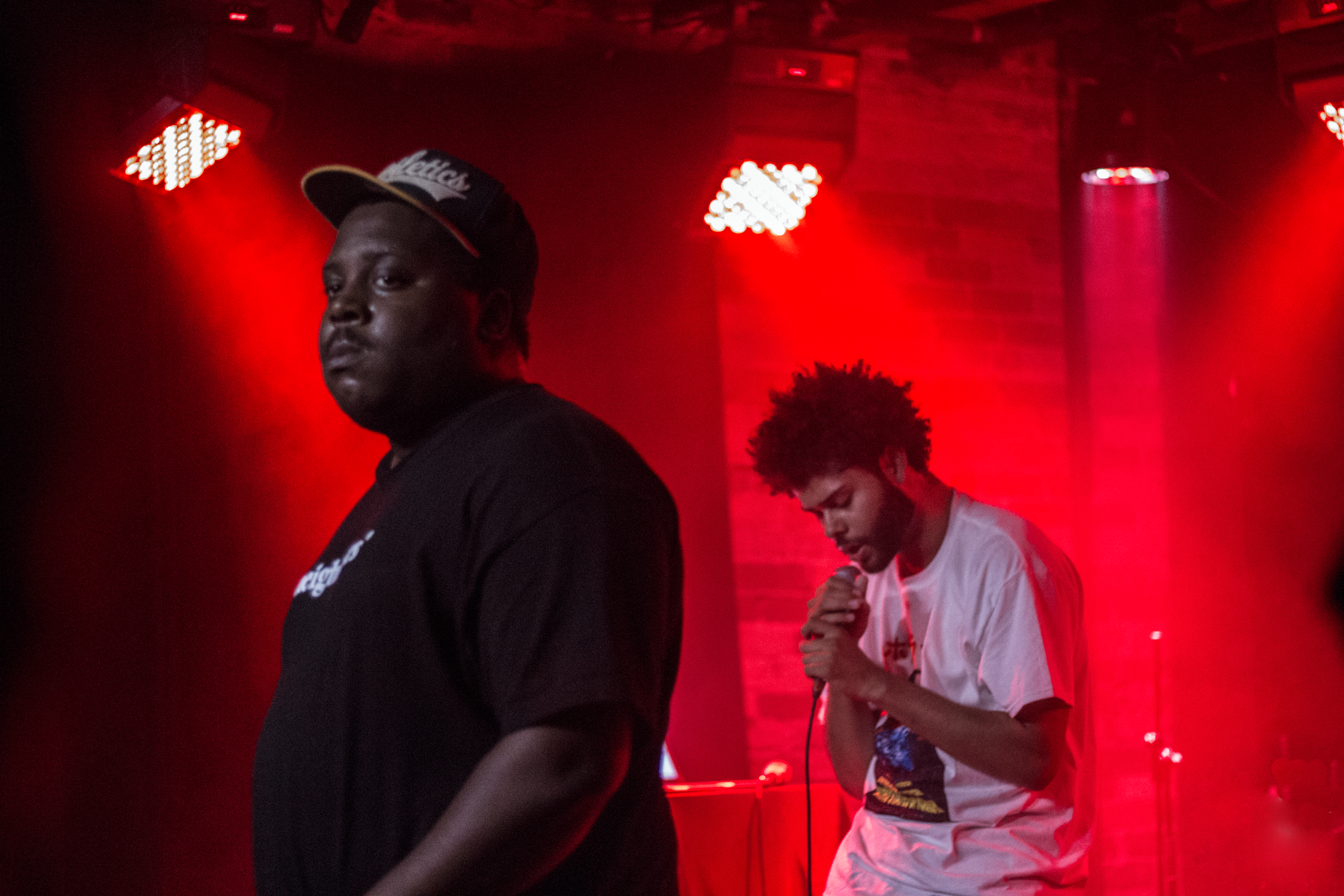
Groggs and RiTchie performing in 2017

On September 29, 2017, the group released an EP titled Drive It Like It's Stolen, preceded by the singles, "North Pole" (featuring Austin Feinstein), "See You Sweat", and "Boom (X3)". All of the singles were released with accompanying music videos. They joined Ho99o9 and The Underachievers on separate tours in 2017. In 2018, the group embarked on their first headlining tour, accompanied by Indiana artist Freddie Gibbs for its second half, and were featured on the Aminé single "Campfire".

On September 6, 2018, the group released a statement through their social media, stating they signed a record label with Loma Vista, helmed by A&R, Kyambo "Hip Hop" Joshua, and they'd be releasing their debut album under the label. On May 17, 2019, the group released their self-titled debut album to generally favorable reviews. Following their debut album, the group embarked on a world headlining tour.

=== 2020–2022: Death of Stepa J. Groggs and By the Time I Get to Phoenix ===
Stepa J. Groggs died on June 29, 2020, at age 32. The group announced his death on their Twitter account, mourning "a loving father, life partner and friend," and provided a GoFundMe to help support Groggs' family. No cause of death was released. Since Groggs' death, the group has been featured on songs by Dos Monos, Tony Velour and Aminé.

On September 15, 2021, the group self-released their second studio album, By the Time I Get to Phoenix, led by the singles, "Knees", and "Superman That". The album features Bruiser Brigade rapper ZelooperZ, and was engineered by Zeroh. Shortly following the release, the group embarked on a worldwide tour, alongside Slauson Malone and Colloboh on the US leg. Initially, Zeroh was the supporting act alongside Slauson Malone, but was replaced with Colloboh due to unforeseen circumstances. In an interview with Huck Magazine, interviewer Thomas Hobbs asked Ritchie with a T if the group could continue without Groggs. Ritchie responded: "I can imagine [Groggs] joking and saying: 'Y'all better still do this shit!'. But then I can also imagine him saying: 'You better not step on a stage without me!'. We're still figuring it out... We've not had an explicit conversation about continuing the group, but me and Parker will continue to create together [in some capacity]."

On September 28, 2022, the group released a remix of "Ghost" by experimental pop musician, Body Meat, marking their first release since By the Time I Get to Phoenix.

=== 2023: Disbandment and By Storm ===
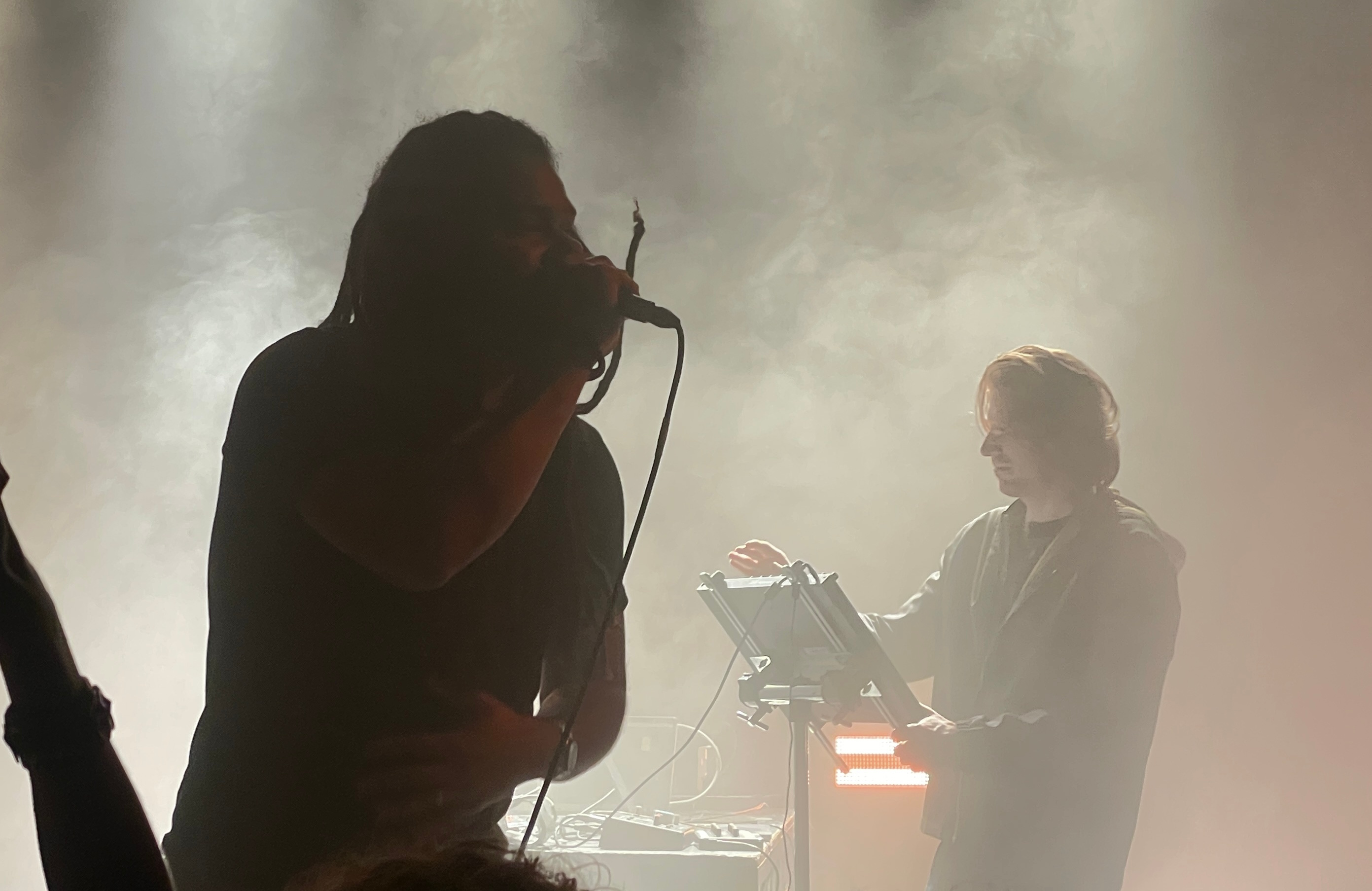
RiTchie and Corey performing as By Storm in 2026

On July 6, 2023, the group confirmed on their Instagram story that there would be no new music from Injury Reserve going forward, and that Ritchie and Corey would continue to produce music under the name By Storm. The group later premiered a new music video, consisting of the final track on By the Time I Get to Phoenix, "Bye Storm", and By Storm's debut single "Double Trio," on August 1, 2023.

They released their debut album, My Ghosts Go Ghost, on 30 January 2026.

== Members ==
=== Final lineup ===
- RiTchie with a T – vocals, recording (2012–2023)
- Parker Corey – production (2013–2023)

=== Previous members ===
- Stepa J. Groggs – vocals (2012–2020; his death) (Note: Groggs passed away in 2020, but his vocals appear on By the Time I Get to Phoenix, released in 2021.)

== Discography ==
Studio albums

- Injury Reserve (2019)
- By the Time I Get to Phoenix (2021)

== Tours ==
Headlining

- Injury Reserve Arena Tour (2018)
- Injury Reserve World Tour (2019)
- By the Time I Get TOuring (2021)
  - North American leg (2021)
  - European leg (2022)
  - Australian leg (2022)
- Injury Reserve & Armand Hammer & AKAI SOLO Joint Tour (2022)

Supporting

- Ho99o9 – United States of Ho99o9 Tour (2017)
- The Underachievers – Renaissance Tour (2017)
- black midi – West Coast North America Tour (2022)
- IDLES – Crawler Tour (2022)
