= Svengali (Cakes da Killa album) =

Studio album by Cakes da Killa
- Released: October 28, 2022
- Genres: Hip-hop; deep house; ballroom
- Length: 29:28
- Label: Young Art
- Producer: Sam Katz

Cakes da Killa chronology
Muvaland, Vol. 2 (2021)	Svengali (2022)	Black Sheep (2024)

Singles from Svengali
- 1. "Luv Me Nots" Released: August 2, 2019; 2. "Sip of My Sip" Released: June 29, 2022; 3. "Drugs du Jour" Released: June 29, 2022; 4. "Svengali" Released: September 1, 2022; 5. "W4TN" Released: September 30, 2022

Svengali is the second studio album by New York rapper Cakes da Killa. It was released on October 28, 2022, through Young Art Records. Cakes da Killa composed the album with Sam Katz and Joshua McCormick.

== Background ==
Cakes da Killa writes about dating in New York City through the lens of a svengali, a person who seduces and manipulates others. In an interview with Them, Cakes explains that, while in relationships, he has had to deduce whether he is dating a svengali or if he is acting like one.

The album was originally ready for release in early 2020 but was delayed with the advent of the COVID-19 pandemic. In an interview with Flood Magazine, Cakes da Killa shares that the project is about love and draws parallels between relationships between lovers, fans, and music more generally. The album includes interludes that Cakes says are real messages from suitors.

== Critical reception ==
Professional ratings
Aggregate scores
Source	Rating
Metacritic	81/100
Review scores
Source	Rating
The Observer	4/5 stars
Pitchfork	7.8/10
Slant Magazine	3.5/5 stars

Svengali was released to generally positive reviews from critics. Pitchfork writer Dylan Green called the album "...a smooth balance of anxiety and aggression, love and lust, confidence and vulnerability." Tara Joshi wrote for The Observer that Svengali is a "sleek, enticing record that certifies Cakes da Killa’s place at the forefront of this sound". Mercy Kassa from Bandcamp Daily said: "Cakes provides a recipe for dancing through both love hangovers and love burnouts".

== Track listing ==
All tracks written by Rashard Bradshaw. All tracks produced by Sam Katz.

No.	Title	Length
1.	"Overture"	0:31
2.	"W4TN"	2:41
3.	"Rabbit Hole"	0:44
4.	"Svengali"	2:59
5.	"Luv Me Nots"	3:15
6.	"La Cocaina"	1:20
7.	"Mirror Mirror"	0:26
8.	"Drugs du Jour"	2:33
9.	"Gratitude"	0:32
10.	"Ball and Chain"	2:34
11.	"Sip of My Sip" (featuring Sevndeep)	3:18
12.	"Luv Me Nots (Reprise)"	2:23
13.	"Sub Song"	1:23
14.	"Think Harder"	3:08
15.	"Climax"	1:35
Total length:		29:28
