= By the Time I Get to Phoenix (Injury Reserve album) =

Studio album by Injury Reserve
- Released: September 15, 2021
- Recorded: 2019–2020
- Genres: Experimental hip-hop; glitch hop
- Length: 41:14
- Label: Self-released
- Producers: Injury Reserve; Parker Corey; Sadpony; Jam City; Body Meat; Morgan Simpson

Injury Reserve chronology
| Injury Reserve (2019) | By the Time I Get to Phoenix (2021) | My Ghosts Go Ghost (2026) |

Singles from By the Time I Get to Phoenix
- 1. "Knees" Released: 11 August 2021; 2. "Superman That" Released: 1 September 2021

By the Time I Get to Phoenix is the second and final studio album by American rap group Injury Reserve. It was released on September 15, 2021, and is dedicated to late member Stepa J. Groggs, who died during the recording of the album. The album features Bruiser Brigade rapper ZelooperZ, with production contributions from Black Midi drummer Morgan Simpson, as well as Body Meat, Jam City, and SADPONY. It is the group's final release under this name, as surviving members RiTchie with a T and Parker Corey would later regroup in 2023 under the name By Storm, loosely named after the album's final track, "Bye Storm".

== Background and production ==
Once the tracklist came together and we started to make sense of it, one of the last phone conversations we had with Groggs was over his love for the repurposing of Isaac Hayes’ By the Time I Get to Phoenix to title the album. Shortly thereafter we were struck with his loss and of course everything was put on hold, but eventually, we regathered and felt most comfortable finishing this album we had made as it still resonated fully (in some respects even taking on what felt like haunting pre-echoes) and above all else stayed true to his constant insistence while recording to simply ‘make some weird shit.’

— Injury Reserve, in a social media statement made prior to the release of the album

While touring in Europe after the release of their self-titled 2019 album, the group performed an improvised DJ set remixing their songs to create a new avant-garde style; at one point in the set, they remixed the Black Country, New Road song "Athens, France". This impromptu sample flip, along with improvised vocals by Ritchie With a T, laid the foundation for one of the album's two singles, "Superman That". Inspired by this set, they pursued this experimental sonic direction when crafting their next album. The album's production was influenced by tumultuous events in 2020, including the COVID-19 pandemic and George Floyd protests. Halfway through the year, when the album was mostly completed, Stepa J. Groggs died. Following his death, the group went on a brief two-month hiatus before completing the remainder of the album. The remaining group members named the album, By the Time I Get to Phoenix, as Groggs had suggested.

The album explores a variety of personal themes ranging from hopelessness, death, and despair. Some songs also touch on the political themes of the COVID-19 pandemic, and the increase of conspiracy theories during that time. A good majority of the lyrical content was heavily influenced by the sudden death of emcee Ritchie with a T's stepfather. As an effect, the writing ventures away from the typical verse-chorus structure with most songs lacking a chorus, hook, or bridge to create friction and tension. During the recording process, Ritchie with a T would record his vocals in a dark room:

"I recorded all my stuff alone in a dark room, but this created a truth. I was trying to rap in new voices so I could get out of my head."

In response to the lyrics, the album embraces a more deconstructed, dissonant sound in terms of production in comparison to the group's previous releases. In an article for The New Yorker, Sheldon Pearce categorized the album as a "post-rap epic, exploding with poignant music that is hectic, congested, and glitchy."

== Release and promotion ==
Following a year-long silence, the album's release date and name was revealed on the group's social media alongside a statement with no prior warning. The album was made available for pre-order the same day via Bandcamp. The lead single, "Knees", was released the following day accompanied by a music video.

Another single, "Superman That" was teased on August 30, 2021 through their social media. It was released on September 1, 2021 with a music video. Simultaneously with the release of "Superman That", a black vinyl pressing packaged with a poster limited to 1,000 copies was made available on their website.

A week prior to the release of the album, an international tour was revealed with musicians Zeroh & Slauson Malone as supporting acts on the American leg of the tour. Tickets for all touring dates were made live on their website on September 10, 2021. Due to unforeseen circumstances, Zeroh was replaced by electronic producer Colloboh as a supporting act. On November 2, it was announced that frequent collaborator and musician Body Meat would join the European leg of the tour. Native dance troupe, Indigenous Enterprise opened the New York show without any prior announcement.

Two days prior to the release of the album, a release show limited to 50 occupants held in Palabra in Phoenix, Arizona was announced via their social media. It was held on September 16, 2021, one day after the release of the album and was livestreamed on the group's Instagram. Shortly thereafter, the group announced a 2 hour radio mix for English online radio station NTS. It featured remixes of Soulja Boy's 2007 single "Crank Dat" and the Jockstrap song "The City". It also featured edits of the released singles, "Superman That", and "Knees".

In an interview with Anthony Fantano of The Needle Drop, the group revealed that the album was completed in the final months of 2020, and was to be released that year, but their record label Loma Vista refused to release it commercially. The label released the group from their contract after they requested it, and allowed them to independently release the album.

The album cover was designed by band member Parker Corey and was sourced from a frame of a National Geographic documentary, where the camera crew filmed a man standing outside in a dust storm.

== Critical reception ==
Professional ratings
Aggregate scores
| Source | Rating |
|---|---|
| AnyDecentMusic? | 7.6/10 |
| Metacritic | 82/100 |
Review scores
| Source | Rating |
| Beats Per Minute | 80% |
| Clash | 9/10 |
| Flood Magazine | 8/10 |
| Exclaim! | 4.5/5 stars |
| Loud and Quiet | 6/10 |
| Pitchfork | 7.7/10 |
| Sputnikmusic | 5/5 stars |
| Under the Radar | 5.5/10 |

By the Time I Get to Phoenix was met with critical acclaim while polarizing critics. At Metacritic, which assigns a normalized rating out of 100 to reviews from professional publications, the album received an average score of 82 based on 9 reviews, indicating "universal acclaim".

Critics commented on the jarring experimental nature of the album in comparison to previous releases. Wesley McLean of Exclaim! deemed the project "the most experimental and least accessible Injury Reserve project thus far, abandoning any semblance of tradition or convention", and went on to herald it as "an abstract, melancholic and affecting body of work that is not only another incredible addition to a stellar discography, but a magnificent and moving tribute to a friend gone too soon". Jack Oxford of Clash similarly commended the innovative production, calling it "a truly dystopian impression of despair, smashing together polar opposite genres to create something wholly new" before pondering if the album could be considered "post-rap". In a positive review for The New Yorker, Sheldon Pearce discussed the effectiveness of the group's multi-genre approach, writing, "It’s in the smoking wreckage of the Injury Reserve sound that the members found the radical yet tuneful music they’d been seeking all along—it isn’t rap or pop or punk, but it’s also all of those things at once".

In a more mixed review, Joey Arnone of Under the Radar criticized the disorganization of the release, describing it as "a patchwork of ideas than anything, resembling a puzzle with all of its pieces scattered", while praising the emotional depth of tracks like "Top Picks for You".

=== Year-end rankings ===
Year-end rankings for By the Time I Get to Phoenix
| Publication | List | Rank | Ref. |
|---|---|---|---|
| Sputnikmusic | Staff's Top 50 Albums of 2021 | 4 | |
| PopMatters | The 75 Best Albums of 2021 | 11 | |
| BrooklynVegan | 30 Best Rap Albums of 2021 | 14 | |
| Spin | The 30 Best Albums of 2021 | 19 | |
| NPR Music | The Best Music of 2021 | 20 | |
| Beats Per Minute | Top 50 Albums of 2021 | 39 | |
| Consequence of Sound | Top 50 Albums of 2021 | 41 | |

== Track listing ==
All tracks are produced by Injury Reserve, except for "Smoke Don't Clear", produced with Body Meat, and "Top Picks for You", produced with Sadpony and Jam City.

By the Time I Get to Phoenix track listing
| No. | Title | Writer(s) | Length |
|---|---|---|---|
| 1. | "Outside" | Jordan Groggs; Morgan Simpson; Nathaniel Ritchie; Parker Corey; Angel Rada^{[a]} | 6:14 |
| 2. | "Superman That" | Ritchie; Corey; Groggs; Charlie Wayne^{[b]}; Georgia Ellery^{[b]}; Isaac Wood^{[b]}; Luke Mark^{[b]}; Lewis Evans^{[b]}; May Kershaw^{[b]}; Tyler Hyde^{[b]} | 2:40 |
| 3. | "SS San Francisco" (featuring Zelooperz) | Groggs; Ritchie; Walter Williams; Corey; Mark Smith^{[c]}; Stephen Hanley^{[c]} | 3:51 |
| 4. | "Footwork in a Forest Fire" | Groggs; Ritchie; Hanley; Corey; Robert Fripp^{[d]} | 3:36 |
| 5. | "Ground Zero" | Groggs; Ritchie; Corey; Brix Smith^{[e]}; Karl Burns^{[e]}; M. Smith^{[e]}; Hanley^{[e]} | 2:25 |
| 6. | "Smoke Don't Clear" | Groggs; Ritchie; Corey; Christopher Taylor | 2:30 |
| 7. | "Top Picks for You" | Groggs; Ritchie; Corey; Jack Latham; Jeremiah Raisen | 4:33 |
| 8. | "Wild Wild West" | Groggs; Ritchie; Corey | 2:28 |
| 9. | "Postpostpartum" | Groggs; Ritchie; Corey; Tee Mac^{[f]} | 4:10 |
| 10. | "Knees" | Groggs; Ritchie; Corey; Cameron Picton^{[g]}; Geordie Greep^{[g]}; Matthew Kwasniewski-Kelvin^{[g]}; Simpson^{[g]} | 5:03 |
| 11. | "Bye Storm" | Groggs; Ritchie; Corey; Brian Eno^{[h]} | 3:40 |
| Total length: | | | 41:14 |

=== Sample credits ===
- ^{^[a]}"Outside" contains excerpts from "Panico a Las 5 A.M.", written and performed by Angel Rada. It also contains an excerpt from YouTube rap battle video, "DOT VS BILL COLLECTOR SMACK/URL RAP BATTLE", performed by Dot.
- ^{^[b]}"Superman That" contains excerpts from the single version of "Athens, France", written and performed by Black Country, New Road.
- ^{^[c]}"SS San Francisco" contains excerpts from "Auto-Tech Pilot", written and performed by The Fall.
- ^{^[d]}"Footwork in a Forest Fire" contains excerpts from "Sailor's Tale", written and performed by King Crimson.
- ^{^[e]}"Ground Zero" contains excerpts from "I Am Damo Suzuki", written and performed by the Fall.
- "Wild Wild West" contains an uncredited excerpt from the Peel Session recording of "The End of Radio", written and performed by Shellac.
- ^{^[f]}"Postpostpartum" contains excerpts from "Nam Myoho Renge Kyo", written and performed by Tee Mac.
- ^{^[g]}"Knees" contains excerpts from "Sweater", written and performed by Black Midi.
- ^{^[h]}"Bye Storm" contains excerpts from "Here Come the Warm Jets", written and performed by Brian Eno.

== Personnel ==
Credits are adapted from Tidal & Bandcamp.

Injury Reserve

- Ritchie with a T – performance (all tracks), executive production, recording, writing (all tracks)
- Parker Corey – production (all tracks), executive production, creative direction, writing (all tracks)
- Stepa J. Groggs – performance (tracks 2, 4, 8–10), executive production, writing (all tracks)
- Nick Herbert – day-to-day management

Additional personnel

- ZelooperZ – additional vocals (track 3), writing (track 5)
- Dot – additional vocals (track 1)
- Jeremiah "SADPONY" Raisen – production & writing (track 7)
- Jack "Jam City" Latham – production & writing (track 7)
- Chris "Body Meat" Taylor – drums (track 5), writing (track 6)
- Morgan Simpson – drums & writing (track 1)
- Zeroh – mixing & mastering (all tracks)
