= My Ghosts Go Ghost =

2026 studio album by By Storm

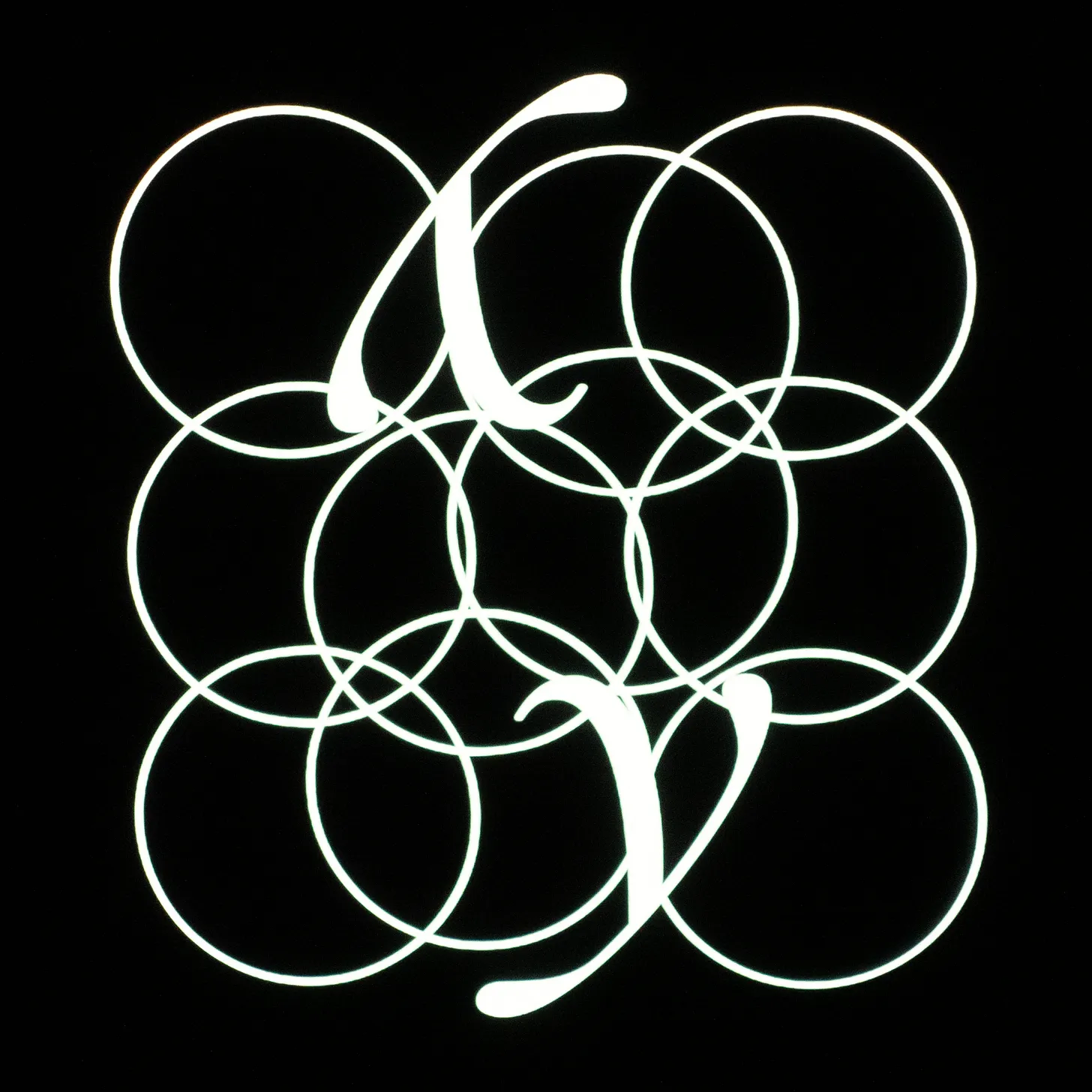

Studio album by By Storm
- Released: January 30, 2026
- Genres: Experimental hip-hop; abstract hip-hop; electronic; art pop
- Length: 46:09
- Labels: deadAir; By(e) Storm
- Producers: Parker Corey; Nathaniel Ritchie

Singles from My Ghosts Go Ghost
- 1. "Zig Zag" Released: February 27, 2025; 2. "Double Trio 2" Released: April 14, 2025; 3. "In My Town" Released: July 3, 2025; 4. "And I Dance" Released: January 15, 2026

My Ghosts Go Ghost is the debut studio album by American experimental hip-hop duo By Storm. It was released on January 30, 2026, through deadAir Records. Following the death of Stepa J. Groggs in 2020 and the release of By the Time I Get to Phoenix (2021), surviving members RiTchie and Parker Corey disbanded Injury Reserve. The two debuted as By Storm with the single "Double Trio" in 2023. The duo began working on new material following their final Injury Reserve tour in late 2022. After multiple failed attempts to form an album during these sessions, they slowly released songs they were confident in. These songs became the lead singles to My Ghosts Go Ghost and were pivotal to the formation of the album.

An experimental hip-hop album, My Ghosts Go Ghost explores multiple sonic influences, including electronic, jazz, psychedelia, and art pop, and is a maximalist effort with the digital use of Auto-Tune and chopped samples of traditional instruments like guitar and violin. In contrast to their earliest work as Injury Reserve, the album is more acoustic and reflects a later stage of processing grief and mourning. Additionally, the album's themes include family life, fame, and financial instability. The album contains a sole guest appearance from Billy Woods and contributions from saxophonist Patrick Shiroishi.

To promote the album, By Storm performed in several cities in 2025 and released four singles: "Zig Zag", "Double Trio 2", "In My Town", and "And I Dance". Upon release, My Ghosts Go Ghost was met with universal critical acclaim, with music critics giving praise to the album's eclectic production, emotional themes, and abstract lyrics. Commercially, the album peaked at number 21 on the North American College and Community Radio Chart (NACC).

== Background and production ==
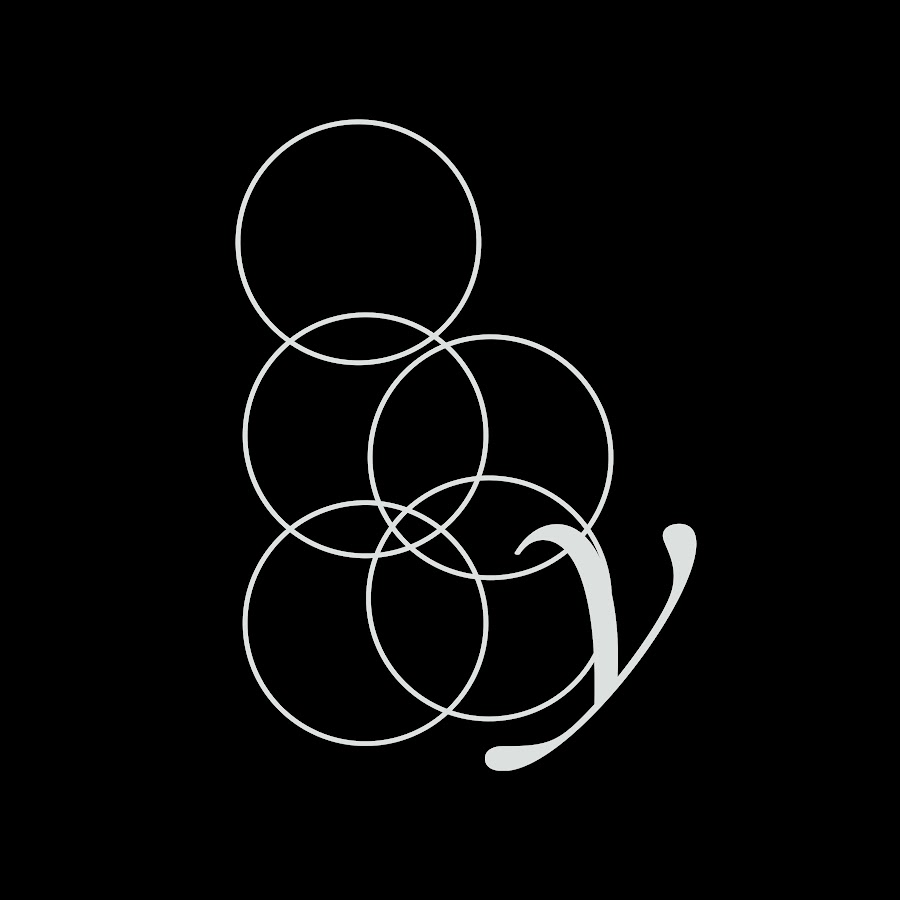
By Storm's logo

Injury Reserve was a Tempe-based hip-hop group composed of producer Parker Corey and rappers Stepa J. Groggs and RiTchie with a T, known for their experimental and abstract production. After the death of Stepa J. Groggs in 2020, Injury Reserve released their second and final studio album, By the Time I Get to Phoenix, to critical acclaim. They later reformed as a duo under the name By Storm in 2023, releasing a music video for Injury Reserve's final release, "Bye Storm", and their first release as By Storm, "Double Trio".

The duo began working on new material shortly after the final Injury Reserve tour in late 2022. However, a full-length album did not materialize out of these sessions. Instead, the duo began to slowly release "songs [they] were confident in", citing pressure from "debuting a new band while also following up a relatively successful album". Throughout 2025, the duo released three singles, each with a maxi release. They also played shows in Phoenix, New York City, London, and Los Angeles. The shows were intended to mimic an improvisational DJ set they did as Injury Reserve in 2019, which laid the foundation of By the Time I Get to Phoenix. As time went on, these shows became more planned, as the duo created new material in preparation. By their last show in Los Angeles, the duo finalized My Ghosts Go Ghost. Corey cited HTRK and Chuquimamani-Condori as inspirations for the sound of the album.

== Composition ==
=== Overview ===
My Ghosts Go Ghost was described as experimental, abstract hip-hop, electronic music, and art pop by various reviewers. It consists of nine tracks at a runtime of 46 minutes, with each track varying in length from four to seven minutes. Devin Birse of Still Listening described the sonic palette as shifting between folk, psychedelia, jazz, and boom bap, and music reviewer Hip Hop Golden Age credited IDM, noise, and folk for the album's influence.

Birse also contrasted the production of My Ghosts Go Ghost with By the Time I Get to Phoenix, highlighting a departure from an experimental rock, "post-apocalyptic" sound. Critics highlighted the maximalist sound of Corey's instrumentation, which incorporates acoustic guitar, violin, saxophone, and synths, along with Auto-Tuned vocals and chopped samples persisting throughout the album. Tom Morgan of Clash compared the music to that of Dälek, describing RiTchie's lyrics as "fissure vents on the side of a volcano." Benny Sun of Pitchfork said that "both the lyrics and production of [this album] feel more conversational and off-cuff than anything the duo have previously attempted." My Ghosts Go Ghost is produced entirely by the duo, with saxophone from Patrick Shiroishi, mixing and mastering from Zeroh, and a sole guest appearance from fellow rapper Billy Woods.

Critics have described the album as a reflection on grief and mourning, but the duo has pushed back on this, expressing that such themes are over-applied to their music. They describe these songs as capturing new steps in life, moments of reflection, and the necessity of moving forward, rather than serving solely as expressions of mourning. Tracks including "And I Dance" and "Double Trio 2" embrace the experience for a time before acknowledging the need to push ahead, emphasizing that the album is not entirely about grief but rather about life's evolving realities. In a review for The Hoya, Juan P. Almanza described the album as contemplative rather than mournful or melancholic.

=== Tracks 1–4 ===
"Can I Have You For Myself?"
"Can I Have You For Myself?" shows a stylistic departure from Injury Reserve's work, featuring an acoustic guitar melody as RiTchie sings gently about his child's birth.

The opening track, "Can I Have You For Myself?", features an acoustic guitar melody and auto-tuned crooning before shifting to a folktronica waltz in its latter half. In a review for Beats Per Minute, John Wohlmacher described the instrumentation as "much gentler than anything Injury Reserve had ever produced." On the track, RiTchie addresses his wife on the eve of their child's birth, "tempering his gratitude with a desire for things to stay the way they are." As RiTchie's vocals fade, a sound effect of a baby crying emerges, before shifting to distorted drum loops and increasing glitch noises. The second track, "Dead Weight", features a looping guitar arpeggio, backed by frantic drumming, unpredictable pauses, and undecipherable vocal layers. Pitchfork compared the track's percussion to Morgan Simpson of Black Midi, who previously worked with the duo on By the Time I Get to Phoenix, and Rashied Ali, while Beats Per Minute compared the track's guitar layer to Radiohead's Kid A (2000). The content of the song features RiTchie using hair as a metaphor for shared experience and grief, refusing to cut his dreadlocks to not "forget him."

"Grapefruit" was described as "a constant semi-quaver pattern alongside stilted hi-hats and snares, a somewhat anxiety-inducing rhythm track when backed by minor-key harp flourishes and swooning group vocals" by Ben Devlin of MusicOMH, with Liam Inscoe-Jones of Paste comparing its sound to that of Xiu Xiu and Beats Per Minute comparing the song's "film-noir aura" to the works of Denzel Curry. The lyrics find RiTchie talking about how fame leads to unwanted attention and invites people to pry into his personal life. "In My Town", mixing IDM, trance, and ambient, explores themes of financial instability and the struggles of touring through RiTchie's lyrics, ending with three minutes with "no distinct direction". Reflecting on the track's lyrics, RiTchie explained that "In My Town" addresses Live Nation's post-COVID program in which artists were given Shell gas station gift cards and an additional $1,200 to perform in their venues. This initiative created a tension for smaller acts who often opened for touring artists, allowing them to profit from tours they normally lost money on, and in some cases leading artists to book exclusively with Live Nation. The track reflects this dilemma, capturing the conflict between taking lucrative opportunities and supporting independent venues, highlighting the broader conversation about navigating the music industry in the aftermath of the pandemic.

=== Tracks 5–9 ===
Near the midpoint of the track list is "Zig Zag", a track that incorporates "a maelstrom of glitching synths and noodling guitar" that eventually swallows RiTchie's vocals. Reminiscent of King Krule's music, RiTchie speaks to an audience of his attempts to dodge the obstacles in life, only to "finally succumb and no longer be able to dodge" as the song progresses from intimate to overwhelming. "Best Interest" features rapper Billy Woods, asks "blunt questions," and incorporates a distorted, artifacted violin in its instrumental.

"Double Trio 2"
A sequel to the duo's 2023 debut single, "Double Trio 2" features experimental jazz textures from spiritual to avant-garde with a prominent saxophone feature from Patrick Shiroishi. Critics described the track as a struggle to move from grief.

It is followed by "Double Trio 2", the sequel to the duo's 2023 debut single, "Double Trio". Like its predecessor, Corey's production features elements of jazz, incorporating "bright, squelching, backpack-era horns" on top of "dense, needle-quaking percussion," and was compared to Ben Frost. The track's saxophone, performed by Patrick Shiroishi, is the only live instrument on the album. Compared to the song's predecessor, it contains more maximalist production with avant-garde jazz horns and catastrophic percussion, before breaking into a "spiritual jazz freakout". Beats Per Minute described the track as expressionist and chaotic, and Tom Breihan of Stereogum described it as "buzz-drone." Lyrically, critics described the track as a struggle to move on from grief, continuing the themes of the first "Double Trio". The track also interpolates "Bye Storm" from By the Time I Get to Phoenix, and samples the first "Double Trio".

"And I Dance", the album's penultimate track, is a "clattering and emotional club meditation" that finds RiTchie celebrating that he has made it to "the other side." Sonically, it uses "stuttering, robotic vocals" under electronic textures before fracturing by the end of the track. Beats Per Minute compared the track to Kanye West's music, and called the song an "epic spiritual hymn that embraces religious imagery while embracing the beauty of life." Pitchfork compared Corey's production on "And I Dance" to Arca.

My Ghosts Go Ghost concludes with "GGG" in a way similar to Woods' Golliwog (2025), on which RiTchie is trying to "summon ghosts of the dead" to no avail as Spanish guitar instrumentation plays. In the song's final verse, RiTchie is "dodging [his] shadows to trying to cast more," questioning whether or not he should "light candles," checking the doorhandles and his basement, not knowing if he did "it" wrong. Beats Per Minute described it as a "séance [that] becomes the struggle with life... and, ultimately, with mourning." At mid-chord, the album ends suddenly, following a circular structure that leads back to the opening track, "Can I Have You For Myself?", with Paste describing the ending as a "symbol of uncertainty more fitting for [By Storm] than any other duo working today." In an interview with Anthony Fantano of The Needle Drop, RiTchie described the track as exploring the process of shedding one's past and moving forward. It reflects a tension between letting go of elements that are no longer needed and recognizing their importance in personal development. While the track can be interpreted in terms of grief, it is more broadly about confronting and releasing past attachments, with the "ghost" serving as a metaphor for these lingering influences rather than representing any specific person.

== Promotion and release ==
Following the release of By Storm's debut single, "Double Trio", in August 2023, the duo did not release any new material under the name for a year. On December 25, 2024, the duo returned from their year-long silence with a post to their social media accounts, promising to release new music in 2025. (Note: By Storm (December 25, 2024). "This is the official By Storm logo. New music in 2025". Instagram.) On February 25, 2025, the duo announced their first single since 2023, "Zig Zag", and premiered the music video the following day. On February 27, the single was released across all streaming platforms. On March 8, the duo performed their first live show as By Storm in Phoenix, Arizona, serving as the foundation for My Ghosts Go Ghost. (Note: By Storm (February 28, 2025). "Our debut show next Saturday, March 8, at Palabra in downtown Phoenix. We will be performing in the stockholm setup w support from Corridos Ketamina @corridosketamina tickets are $15 and available now at palabraphx.com (direct link in bio)". Instagram.)

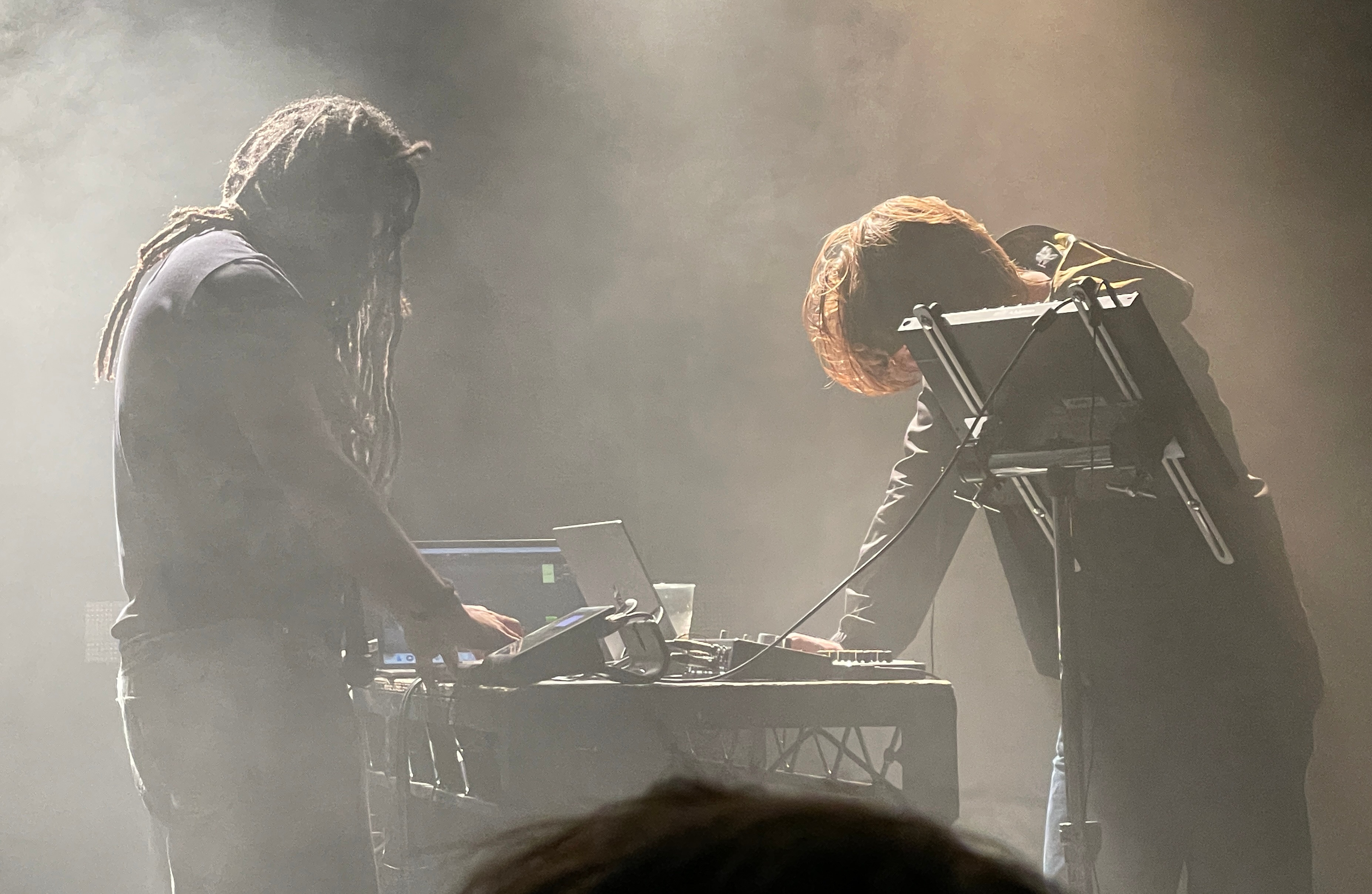
By Storm performing in London in April 2026

On April 2, the duo announced their second single, "Double Trio 2", a sequel to their 2023 debut single, "Double Trio". They premiered the music video the following day, and the single arrived on streaming platforms on April 4. On July 2, the duo premiered the music video to their third single, "In My Town". The single released on streaming platforms the following day. (Note: By Storm (July 2, 2025). "Our new single "In My Town" is out now on YouTube. It will also be available on streaming tonight at midnight wherever you are". Instagram.) The duo performed live in New York, London, and Los Angeles between May and October. (Note: By Storm (April 9, 2025). "First By Storm New York show will be on May 17 at Nightclub 101 with support from @l.a.timpa , 7pm, tickets available now at the link in our bio". Instagram.) (Note: By Storm (July 18, 2025). "Our next two shows will be in London, England and Los Angeles, California on September 27 and October 17 respectively. There are only 24 tickets left in London rn so get them while you can. All available via the website". Instagram.) Before their Los Angeles show in October, the duo confirmed the existence of an album, and announced that it was their last show before finalizing the project. (Note: By Storm (October 13, 2025). "The show in Los Angeles on Friday will be our last before finishing the album. Sorry for a lack of transparency so far". Instagram.) On January 7, 2026, the duo announced the final single to an eventual debut album, "And I Dance", alongside confirmation that they had signed to deadAir Records on their social media accounts. (Note: By Storm (January 7, 2026). "By Storm – "And I Dance" next week, via deadAir. Final single". Instagram.)

On January 14, the duo formally announced My Ghosts Go Ghost on their social media alongside a statement, and premiered the music video for "And I Dance" the following day. The single formally released on the 16th across all streaming platforms. On January 30, My Ghosts Go Ghost was released through deadAir Records, with the duo holding a release party in Tokyo, Japan. (Note: By Storm (January 27, 2026). "My Ghosts Go Ghost release party in Tokyo. Jan 30 at Beatcafe, 10pm". Instagram.) In the lead-up to its release, a limited edition vinyl pressing of one thousand copies was released on January 26. It was followed by a general release vinyl and CD, alongside other merchandise, on deadAir's website. On February 4, the duo announced the MGGG Tour, with dates in the United States, Canada, and Europe. On February 7, the duo also held an invite-only "special presentation" in Phoenix to celebrate the album's release, with invites being offered to fans through a raffle. (Note: "Phoenix, Arizona: we will be performing a special presentation of My Ghosts Go Ghost". Instagram. January 23, 2026.) On March 23, a live video of the invite-only show was released on the duo's official channel. On April 30, the duo released a music video for "Dead Weight", directed by Japanese filmmaker Daisuke Miyazaki. Commercially, My Ghosts Go Ghost peaked at number 21 on the North American College and Community Radio Chart (NACC).

== Critical reception ==
Professional ratings
Aggregate scores
Source	Rating
Metacritic	80/100
Review scores
Source	Rating
Beats Per Minute	84%
Clash	8/10
Hip Hop Golden Age	8.5/10
The Hoya	5/5 stars
MusicOMH	4/5 stars
The New Hampshire	8.5/10
Paste	B
Pitchfork	7.0/10

My Ghosts Go Ghost received universal acclaim from music critics. According to the review aggregator Metacritic, My Ghosts Go Ghost received "generally favorable reviews" based on a weighted average score of 80 out of 100 from seven critic scores. Juan P. Almanza of The Hoya praised the album for its valiant instrumentals and warm lyricism, describing My Ghosts Go Ghost as a "push and pull of gain and loss" while finding a way to push through. Hip Hop Golden Age praised the album's sonic diversity and emotional themes, noting that "grief shapes sound design, pacing, and silence." While they noted it did not appeal to each listener, they credit the album for resonating through its honesty.

Andrew Sacher of BrooklynVegan ranked My Ghosts Go Ghost as one of the five best rap albums of January 2026, complimenting By Storm's sonic departure from the "brash, industrial-tinged" work of Injury Reserve. John Wohlmacher of Beats Per Minute described the album as a "bold and deeply moving work about the fragilities that come with transformation" as the duo deals with existential situations. Alex Hankins of The New Hampshire complimented the album's lyrics for its honesty and poetry under multi-genre production, while Ben Devlin of MusicOMH considered it to have "intricate rhythms", jazz-inspired melodies, and abstract lyrics.

Liam Inscoe-Jones of Paste wrote at the end of the review that By Storm "have landed somewhere unrecognizable", appreciating the album's ending as a symbol that fits uncertainty for By Storm than any other duo. Benny Sun of Pitchfork found My Ghosts Go Ghost gratifying for the duo to find inspiration from "hard-earned peace" artistically and personally, fulfilling the promise of the future rather than being trapped in their past. Tom Morgan of Clash considered My Ghosts Go Ghost to be a less abrasive experience than their previous album, describing it as a "relentlessly beautiful but demanding and cacophonous" album.

== Track listing ==
All tracks are written and produced by Nathaniel Ritchie and Parker Corey.

My Ghosts Go Ghost track listing
No.	Title	Length
1.	"Can I Have You For Myself?"	5:21
2.	"Dead Weight"	4:28
3.	"Grapefruit"	4:20
4.	"In My Town"	7:02
5.	"Zig Zag"	6:56
6.	"Best Interest" (featuring Billy Woods)	4:28
7.	"Double Trio 2"	5:10
8.	"And I Dance"	4:19
9.	"GGG"	4:02
Total length:		46:09

== Personnel ==
Credits adapted from the duo's Bandcamp.

- Nathaniel Ritchie – vocals, production
- Parker Corey – production, creative direction
- Billy Woods – vocals (6)
- Patrick Shiroishi – saxophone (7)
- Zeroh – mixing, mastering

== Charts ==
Chart performance for My Ghosts Go Ghost
Chart (2026)	Peak position
US & Canadian College Radio Top 200 (NACC)	21
