= Injury Reserve (album) =

Studio album by Injury Reserve
- Released: May 17, 2019
- Genres: Hip-hop; experimental rap
- Length: 38:36
- Label: Loma Vista
- Producers: Injury Reserve (exec.); Nick Herbert (exec.); Kyambo Joshua (also exec.); Parker Corey; Melikxyz; Pro Teens; Technician; Dylan Brady

Injury Reserve chronology
Drive It Like It's Stolen (2017)	Injury Reserve (2019)	By the Time I Get to Phoenix (2021)

Singles from Injury Reserve
- 1. "Jawbreaker" Released: 23 January 2019; 2. "Jailbreak the Tesla" Released: 21 March 2019; 3. "Koruna and Lime" Released: 18 April 2019

Injury Reserve is the debut studio album by American rap group Injury Reserve, released on May 17, 2019, through Loma Vista Recordings. This is their only release under Loma Vista, before departing shortly after the death of bandmate, Stepa J. Groggs. It follows several mixtapes by the group, including Live from the Dentist Office, 2016's Floss and 2017's extended play Drive It Like It's Stolen. The album features artists such as A-Trak, Rico Nasty, Aminé, DRAM, Freddie Gibbs, Cakes da Killa, Dylan Brady, Pro Teens, Tony Velour, and JPEGMafia.

The album's artwork was taken on a hill nearby Malibu, California. The album was promoted with three singles: "Jawbreaker", "Jailbreak the Tesla" and "Koruna and Lime", all released with music videos. The album was released in May 2019 to decent reviews, and appeared on several year-end ranking lists. Injury Reserve charted on Billboard magazine's Heatseekers Albums chart in July 2019. The group went on a worldwide tour, where they began to work on their next album. Groggs died in June 2020 during the recording of their final studio album, By the Time I Get to Phoenix, released in 2021.

== Background and recording ==
By 2018, Hip-hop trio Injury Reserve had released two mixtapes, Live from the Dentist Office (2015) and Floss (2016), and one extended play (EP), Drive It Like It's Stolen (2017); They believed that a full-length album would allow them to express a wider range of emotions. Being interviewed by Loud and Quiet, member Ritchie with a T explained how the group's mindset could not be described in a three minute song. After the mixed reception of their EP Drive It Like It's Stolen, the group's manager Nick Herbert felt that their next project would be their last attempt at "being the new guys." Ritchie said that for their debut album, they wanted to do "something undeniable".

The album was recorded in home studios. From January 15 to February 8, 2018, Injury Reserve moved to a house in Flagstaff, Arizona, where a majority of the material was written for Injury Reserve. From June 7 to July 7, 2018, they recorded in Prague. The album's liner notes further cites the following locations: Tempe, Arizona, New York City and Los Angeles. A majority of the material for Injury Reserve was written during their home studio sessions; Only two songs from the album were conceptualised prior to recording: "Jailbreak the Tesla" and "Rap Song Tutorial".

== Composition ==
=== Style and influences ===
Injury Reserve is an experimental rap album. Reviewing Injury Reserve for The Quietus, Mike Vinti states that the album blends the industrial experimentation of artists like Death Grips and JPEGMafia with elements of boom bap and old school hip hop. Jamie Haworth from Loud and Quiet noted the album's frequent references to internet culture.

=== Songs 1–5 ===
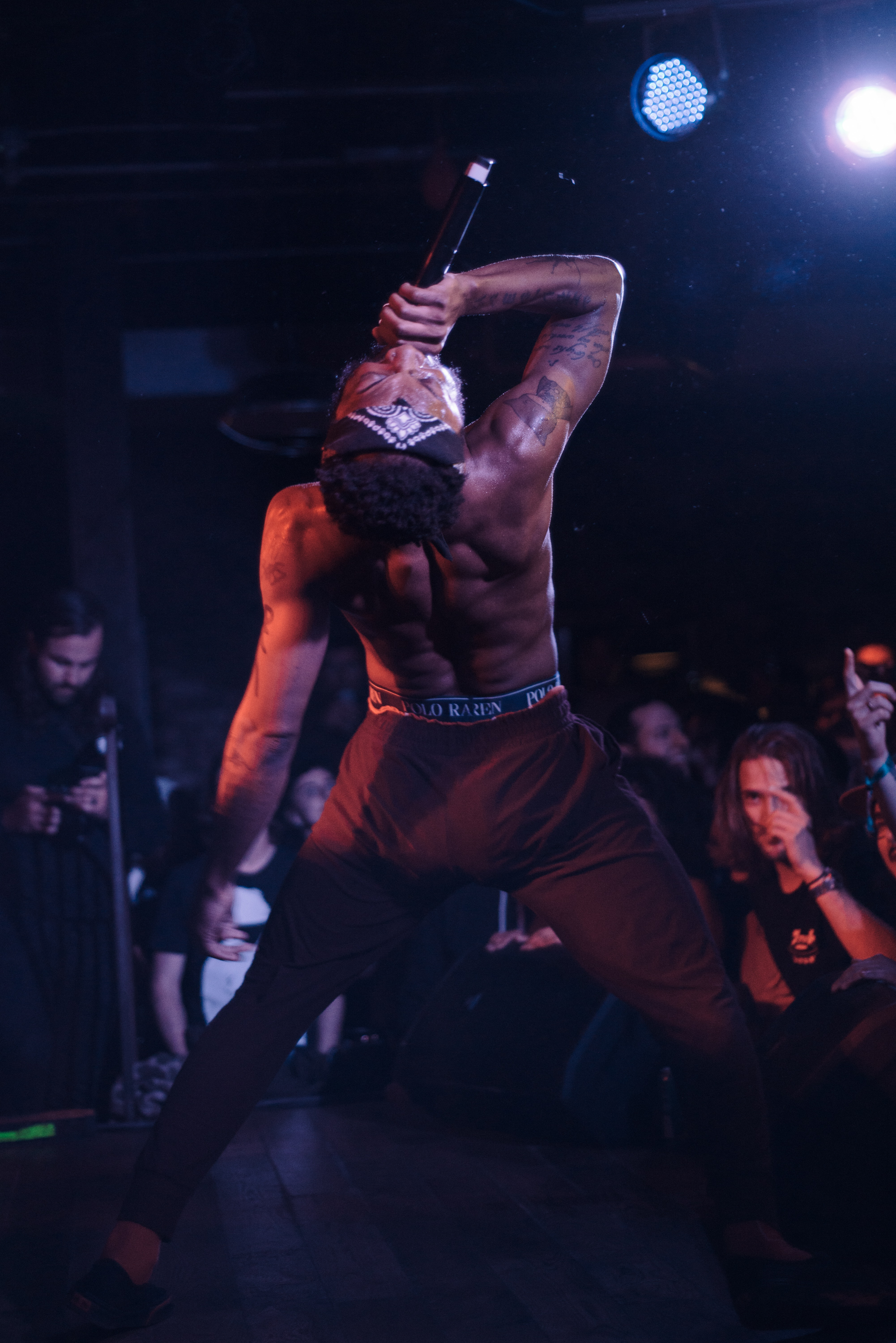
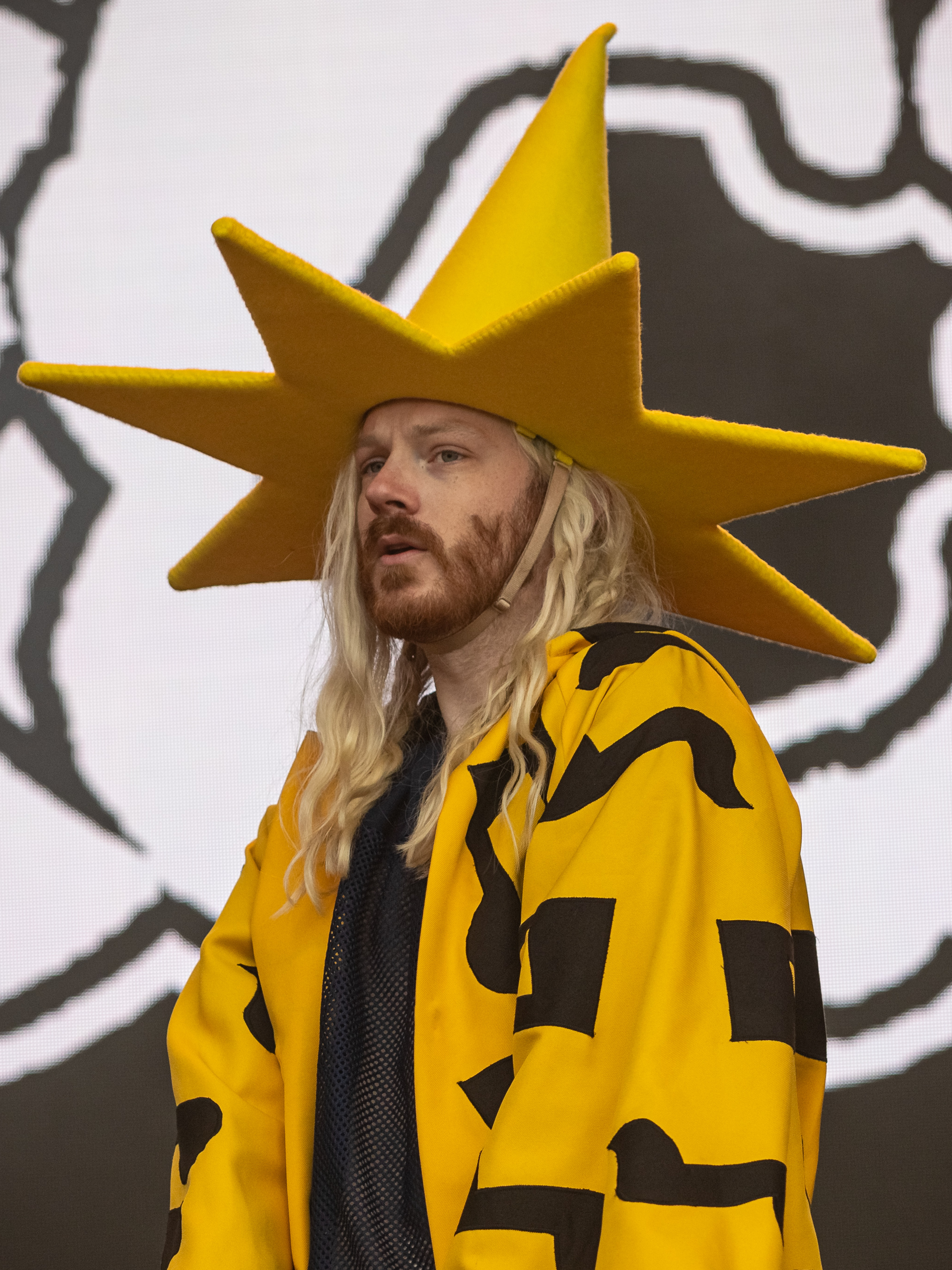
Injury Reserve features collaborations from JPEGMafia (left, pictured in 2019) and Dylan Brady (right, pictured in 2022).

"Koruna and Lime" opens with Groggs expressing frustration over the trio's lack of recognition from mainstream music publications, and talks down on people who didn't believe in the trio's success. Ritchie with a T's verse on "Koruna & Lime" originated from an outtake called "Geek Squad", and closes the song with an "ominous promise"; "maybe I'll see you in my next life". The instrumental to "Jawbreaker" was likened by Colin Joyce from Vice to "japanese environmental music"; An early version of the song contained a "full-fledged drum track" before it was ultimately stripped back, into what Chris Deville from Stereogum defines as "minimalist percussion". "Jawbreaker" criticises the fashion industry, and additionally criticises attention-seeking on social media. Ritchie with a T's spoken word monologue criticises fashion influencer Ian Connor, and refers to his sneakers as the "Rape 3000s". Rico Nasty's verse specifically focuses on the industry's negative treatment on black women. Her verse "spirals into fragility", admitting that she would be dead without the validation she receives from her fans.

"GTFU" features JPEGMafia and Cakes da Killa, who rap over a "suffocating industrial soundscape". "QWERTY Interlude" samples "Kodi Fire Stick" from fellow Arizona rapper Lil QWERTY; The sample is edited to sound like a CD skipping; inspired from the lyric in the song: "How am I supposed to make a dollar when CDs stop happening?". Corey produced the beat for "Jailbreak the Tesla" with assistance from 100 gecs member Dylan Brady. Corey built the foundations of the beat around car sounds, while Brady added a kalimba sample that Deville wrote was "engineered to sound like Tokyo drifting. "Jailbreak the Tesla" outlines a "customised futurist manifesto", that Ritchie felt applied to the trio's overall ethos. In the song, Ritchie with a T imagines the process of hacking an electric Tesla car. Aminè's verse on "Jailbreak the Tesla" adds further edge to the song, and contributes to the song's "pulsating sense of fun".

=== Songs 6–13 ===
"Rap Song Tutorial" is a step by step tutorial that parodies the "lazy tendencies" of modern hip hop; The tutorial ends with the AI voice saying: "Congratulations, you’ve made a rap song. Repeat twelve times to complete a rap album." The AI assistant voice used on "Rap Song Tutorial" was intended as a placeholder, but was kept after "everyone fell in love with it". The example song used in "Rap Song Tutorial" was a Flagstaff outtake, that Corey repurposed for the song. In that song, Ritchie imagines a future where he is "well off and more than ends meet".

"What a Year It's Been" samples the song "13 Angels Standing Guard 'Round the Side of Your Bed" by Canadian post-rock band A Silver Mt. Zion. "Best Spot in the House" opens with a guitar tune-up that seques into a "wailing synth trance." Both songs revolve around themes of depression, self-doubt, and alcoholism. Groggs' verse on "What a Year It's Been" looks back on the mistakes that he made as the trio began garnering success, taking accountability and promising to improve from them. His verse also mentions his lack of self-control and tendency to ghost his loved ones. Corey's hook on "Best Spot in the House" references their time at Flagstaff. On "Best Spot in the House", Groggs details how when his friend went into a coma, he promised he'd talk to him every day if he recovered; he did, but Groggs began to struggle keeping his promise. The story ends as Groggs identifies a figure in the crowd of their first sold-out concert: "Seen that ugly-ass grin, knew I made you proud".

== Artwork and title ==
Ritchie said that for the cover, "We wanted to do something very classic, especially since we were on the front of it. You want something that will age well along with the album." The cover art was taken by Matt Kaplan and designed by Parker Corey; the latter had been conceptualising the cover for months, and took inspiration from the photograph "Laserstahl" by Austrian artist Hartmut Skerbisch. He, along with Nick Herbert, scouted for locations for a few days, where they found a good location near the mountainside. Test photos for the cover art were then taken and sent to the trio's group chat. The photograph was taken early in the morning on a hill nearby Malibu, California. Explaining the album's title to Complex News, Ritchie said: "This is the music we're trying to make, and that's why putting [our] name on it is both refreshing [and] telling."

== Release and promotion ==
Three singles were released for Injury Reserve, all accompanied by music videos directed by Corey and uploaded to YouTube. The first single on the album, "Jawbreaker", was released on January 24, 2019, along with a music video that parodied runway shows. On March 21, 2019, Injury Reserve released the second single from the album, "Jailbreak the Tesla". The music video for "Jailbreak the Tesla" was filmed using a fisheye lens and shows the trio and Aminè driving a white Tesla car. On April 18, 2019, The release date and album cover for Injury Reserve was revealed along with the third and final single, "Koruna & Lime". The video for "Koruna & Lime" follows the trio in a dimly lit studio as they set up a photoshoot. Corey said that the single selection helped spark interest in fans, whom he believed were curious about what the sound of the album would be.

The trio performed a sold-out show at The Victoria music venue in Dalston on May 16, 2019, a day before Injury Reserve released. Injury Reserve spent one week on Billboard's Heatseekers Albums chart, at number 14 on July 6, 2019. The success of the album allowed them to embark on a worldwide tour throughout the remainder of 2019. A performance in Stockholm, Sweden inspired the new sound of their next album. The group worked on the album progressively throughout 2020, with a majority of the material being written before Groggs' death in June 2020. The album was finished, and released under the title By the Time I Get to Phoenix in September 2021, their final studio album before the "Injury Reserve" name was retired in 2023.

== Critical reception ==
Professional ratings
Aggregate scores
Source	Rating
AnyDecentMusic?	7.7/10
Metacritic	75/100
Review scores
Source	Rating
Exclaim!	8/10
The 405	8/10
The Line of Best Fit	9/10
Loud and Quiet	9/10
Pitchfork	6.8/10

Mosi Reeves of Revolver described critical reception of Injury Reserve as "polite but muted." At Metacritic, which assigns a normalised rating out of 100 to reviews from professional publications, the album earned a score of 75 out of 100, based on 7 reviews. Aggregator AnyDecentMusic? gave it 7.7 out of 10, based on their assessment of the critical consensus.

Much of the praise was directed at Corey's production. In a positive review for the album, Chris Dart of Exclaim! called him "Injury Reserve's real driving force", and Kyle Kohner of The 405 wrote that Corey "mix[es] things up with some of the most wonky-sounding production you will hear outside of Death Grips". Sheldon Pearce was more reserved in his assessment for Pitchfork, giving the album a 6.8/10, and wrote that while the album feels "remarkably fresh and singular" when Corey is at his best, "neither Ritchie nor Stepa are particularly groundbreaking MCs" and that they are both "regularly shown up by their guests". He concluded that Injury Reserve "gets stuck between its experimental urges and its pop ambitions" too often, calling the album "never quite noisy enough or quite catchy enough". In his review for The Quietus, Vinti said that the album "encompasses everything great about the last forty years of rap music while simultaneously managing to sound totally distinct from it." Haworth mentions in his interview with the group that the album is defined "as much by its sincerity and its humour." Reviewing Injury Reserve for Vice, Colin Joyce states that the group "come into their own as zoners" on the album, and that they adopt a "rap-smarter-not-harder approach."

=== Year-end rankings ===
Year-end rankings for Injury Reserve
Publication	List	Rank	Ref.
Loud and Quiet	The Loud and Quiet Best 40 Albums Of 2019	18	
Complex	Top Albums Of The Year (So Far)	34	
The Line of Best Fit	The Best Albums Of 2019 Ranked	37	

== Track listing ==
Adapted from liner notes. All songs are produced by Injury Reserve; Only co-producers are noted.

Injury Reserve track listing
No.	Title	Writer(s)	Producers	Length
1.	"Koruna & Lime" (featuring A-Trak)	Nathaniel Ritchie; Jordan Groggs; Parker Corey; Melik Richard; Alain Macklovitch; Elijah Cordano	Melikxyz	2:26
2.	"Jawbreaker" (featuring Rico Nasty and Pro Teens)	Ritchie; Groggs; Corey; Richard; Maria-Cecilia Simone Kelly; Andy Phipps	Pro Teens; Melikxyz	3:28
3.	"GTFU" (featuring JPEGMafia and Cakes da Killa)	Ritchie; Groggs; Corey; Barrington Hendricks; M. Te Kahika; D. Wright; Rashard Bradshaw		3:20
4.	"QWERTY Interlude"	Ritchie; Groggs; Corey; Jay Washington; Richard; Cordano	Melikxyz; Technician	0:32
5.	"Jailbreak the Tesla" (featuring Aminé)	Ritchie; Groggs; Corey; Dylan Brady; Adam Daniel	Dylan Brady	3:19
6.	"Gravy n' Biscuits"	Ritchie; Groggs; Corey; Washington		2:37
7.	"Rap Song Tutorial"	Ritchie; Groggs; Corey		2:22
8.	"Wax On" (featuring Freddie Gibbs)	Ritchie; Groggs; Corey; Fredrick Tipton; Jason Beck; Richard	Melikxyz	4:27
9.	"What a Year It's Been"	Ritchie; Groggs; Corey; Kyambo Joshua; Richard; Therry Amar; Efrim Menuck; Sophie France Trudeau	Melikxyz; Kyambo "Hip Hop" Joshua	3:33
10.	"Hello?!"	Ritchie; Groggs; Corey; Frankie Carle; Jack Lawrence		1:06
11.	"Best Spot in the House"	Ritchie; Groggs; Corey; Richard; Cordano	Technician; Melikxyz	3:18
12.	"New Hawaii" (featuring DRAM, Tony Velour and Dylan Brady)	Ritchie; Groggs; Corey; Jhaisaih Everidge; Brady; Richard; Shelley Marshaun Massenburg-Smith	Melikxyz	4:35
13.	"Three Man Weave"	Ritchie; Groggs; Corey; Hugo Ferran; Frederic Moulin; Lauren Mallazai; Christian Mallazai; Thomas Crocuet		3:26
Total length:				38:29

Samples

- "GTFU" contains a sample of "Aeons", written by M. Te Kahika and D. Wright, performed by Electric Wire Hustle
- "What a Year It's Been" contains samples of "13 Angels Standing Guard 'Round the Side of Your Bed" by Silver Mt. Zion.

== Personnel ==
Adapted from liner notes.

- Jeff Ellis - mixing
- Efran Hajy - assistant mixing
- Mike Bozzi - mastering
- A-Trak - scratch (1)
- Yazmeen Al-Mazeedi - strings (12)
- Stephen "Jonah" Feigenbaum - string arrangement (12)
- Phonte - ad-libs (13)
- Injury Reserve – Executive producer
- Nick Herbert – Executive producer
- Kyambo "Hip Hop" Joshua – Executive producer

Packaging

- Matt Kaplan - artwork
- Parker Corey - artwork design

== Charts ==
Chart performance for Injury Reserve
Chart (2019)	Peak position
US Heatseekers Albums (Billboard)	14

== See also ==
- 2019 in hip hop music

== Sources ==
- Deville, Chris (March 21, 2019). "Band to Watch: Injury Reserve". Stereogum. Archived from the original on January 19, 2022.
- Green, Dylan (July 11, 2019). "Injury Reserve by Injury Reserve by Injury Reserve". Pigeons and Planes. Complex. Archived from the original on June 14, 2021.
- Green, Dylan (November 3, 2021). "Injury Reserve Get Back Up". Pitchfork. Archived from the original on January 26, 2022.
- Haworth, Jamie (July 3, 2019a). "Injury Reserve – The forward motion of an experimental rap group". Loud and Quiet. Archived from the original on October 25, 2021.
- Reeves, Mosi (June 13, 2019). "Meet Injury Reserve: Code Orange-Endorsed Rap Group That Won't Be Pinned Down". Revolver. Archived from the original on January 10, 2022.
- Richardson, Kitty (June 23, 2019). "Injury Reserve: critical darlings". The Line of Best Fit. Archived from the original on June 23, 2019.
