= Cakes da Killa =

American rapper

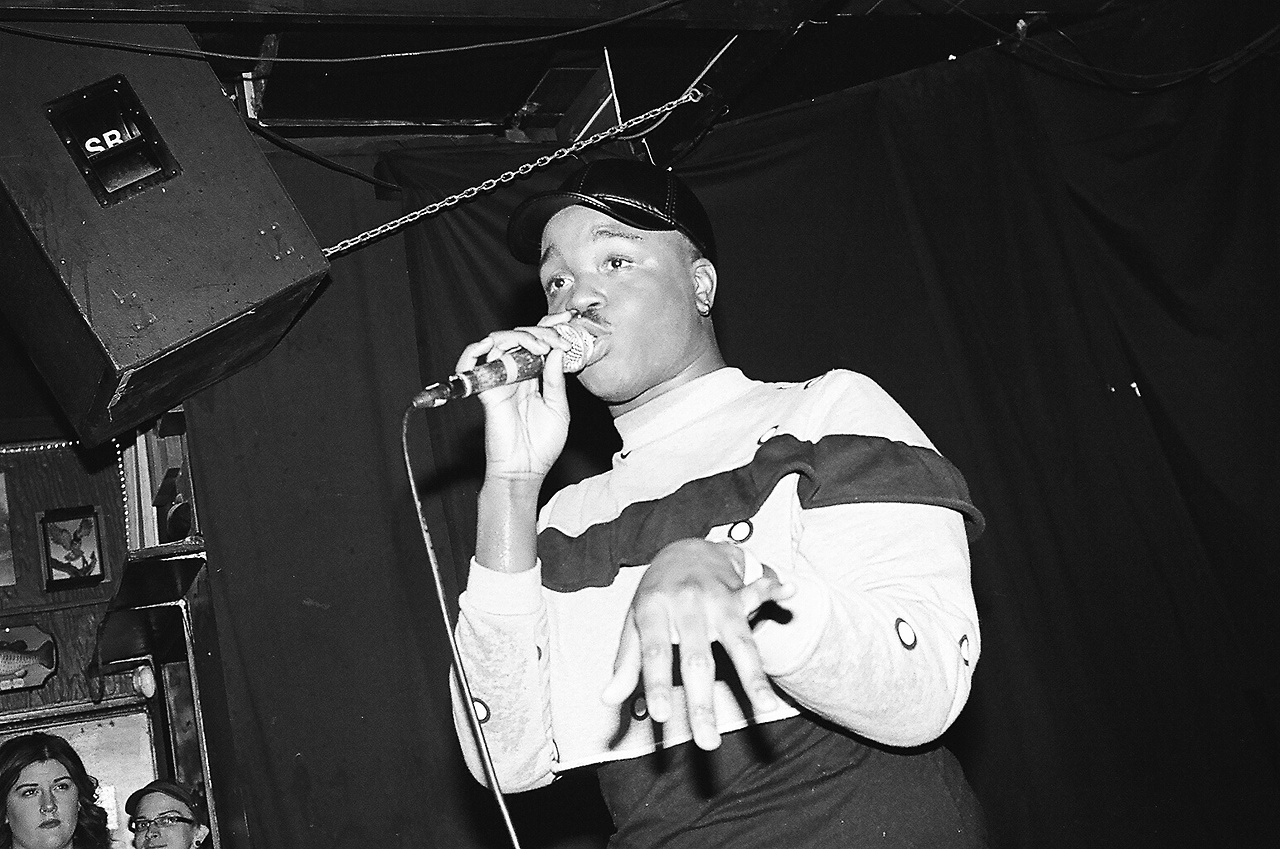
- Bradshaw performing in 2017

Background information
- Born: Rashard Bradshaw; Teaneck, New Jersey, U.S.
- Genres: Hip-hop; electronic; dance
- Occupation: Rapper
- Years active: 2011–present
- Labels: Classic Music Company, Mishka Records
- Website: www.cakesdakilla.com

Rashard Bradshaw, better known as Cakes da Killa, is an American rap artist who fuses genres of hip-hop, house, and electronic dance music. He came to prominence in the "queer explosion" of hip-hop music stemming from New York in 2012 and is among the credited performers for the current trend of acceptance of LGBT people in the rap community. Bradshaw is currently based in Atlanta and his second full-length studio album Svengali was released on October 28, 2022.

== Career ==
=== 2011: Career beginnings and Easy Bake Oven ===
Rashard Bradshaw started rapping in high school for fun before considering it as a career. He first began writing tracks to instrumentals he found on the internet and posting them to Facebook. In 2011, his homemade demos came to the attention of an executive producer named Stixx, who invited Bradshaw to appear on the mixtape Downtown Mayhem Vol. 1 alongside Rip The Ruler. Bradshaw then went on to release his own debut mixtape Easy Bake Oven, Vol. 1 through Stixx' Downtown Mayhem label.

"I came out in the third grade. This is just me being me. People make it sound like it's controversial and revolutionary, and that's weird to me, because in hip-hop you have people glorifying negativity like killing people and not taking care of your kids – and that should be scandalous! That should be what we talk about. An openly gay rapper shouldn't be breaking news."

— Bradshaw on being an openly gay rapper

As an emerging artist in the hip-hop genre—along with fellow LGBT artists such as Le1f, Mykki Blanco, and House of Ladosha—Bradshaw gained popularity through media interest in LGBT figures and themes in hip-hop and rap, having been written about in a Pitchfork article about said "movement".

Bradshaw cites Erykah Badu, Busta Rhymes, Remy Ma, Lil' Kim, Foxy Brown, Cam'ron, Nicki Minaj, and Bette Midler as influences.

=== 2012–2015: The Eulogy, Hunger Pangs, and mainstream success ===
Released for free on Mishka NYC's website, Bradshaw's second mixtape The Eulogy was released to overwhelming popularity when it was reviewed positively by Pitchfork. Miles Raymer of Pitchfork compared his raunchy style to Lil' Kim and praised the production of the mixtape. According to an interview in Paper Magazine, the mixtape's title originally referred to Bradshaw's plan to end his musical career after its release, but he's since changed his mind.

Prior to making his rap career full-time, Bradshaw was an intern at Paper Magazine and worked in the nightlife industry, promoting parties and working doors in New York City. In May 2013, Bradshaw completed his bachelor's degree in fashion studies at Montclair State University. In September 2013, Bradshaw released an EP for his hit single "I Run This Club", which samples M.I.A.'s song by the same name from her 2010 mixtape Vicki Leekx. He later released a Remixes version of this EP which included features from Fat Tony, Siyoung, and Spank Rock on the title track.

"A lot of people especially in the quote-unquote queer community felt like it was a very awkward interview, but my thing is that I throw a party every Friday and it's not a gay party. It's a straight mixed party. These are the kinds of questions I get asked and I'm not one of those queer people who don't have straight friends, so I'm used to it."

— Bradshaw on answering questions about his sexuality

In June 2014, Bradshaw released a nine-track mixtape titled Hunger Pangs. To promote this mixtape, Bradshaw appeared on the Hot 97 radio show Ebro in the Morning where he freestyled live on air. Throughout the interview, Bradshaw's sexuality kept being a topic of discussion, with Ebro calling him a "gay rapper" and Bradshaw correcting him to call himself "a rapper that happens to be gay".

In 2015, Bradshaw released a 5 track EP titled #IMF (In My Feelings), which chronicled a modern-day tale of star crossed lovers from inception to resolution.

=== 2016–present: Studio albums ===
In October 2016, Bradshaw released his highly anticipated debut album Hedonism on Ruffians. In October 2019, Bradshaw appeared on the Netflix reality competition Rhythm + Flow, where he auditioned in front of Cardi B, Jadakiss, and Fat Joe. Following this appearance, Bradshaw has released a handful of singles in 2020, most recently "Don Dada" off his EP Muvaland, which was released in November 2020.

In 2022, Bradshaw released his second studio album, Svengali. His third album, Black Sheep, was released on March 22, 2024. He released New Bitch, a collaborative EP with DJ Miss Parker, in July 2026.

== Discography ==
=== Albums ===
Title	Album details	Ref.
Hedonism	Released: October 21, 2016; Label: Ruffians; Format: Digital download, CD, LP	
Svengali	Released: October 28, 2022; Label: Young Art	
Black Sheep	Released: March 22, 2024; Label: Young Art	

=== Extended plays ===
Title	EP details	Ref.
I Run This Club	Release: September 16, 2013; Label: Hot Mom USA; Format: Digital download	
I Run This Club (Remixes)	Release: May 12, 2014; Label: Hot Mom USA; Format: Digital download	
#IMF	Release: February 10, 2015; Label: Mishka NYC; Format: Digital download	
Muvaland (with Proper Villains)	Release: November 13, 2020; Label: Classic Music Company; Format: Digital download	
Muvaland, Vol. 2 (with Proper Villains)	Release: July 16, 2021; Label: He.She.They; Format: Digital download	
New Bitch (with DJ Miss Parker)	Release: July 24, 2026; Label: Magic City; Format: Digital download	

=== Mixtapes ===
Title	Album details	Ref.
Easy Bake Oven, Vol. 1	Release: October 21, 2011; Label: Downtown Mayhem, LLC/DTM Records; Format: Digital download	
The Eulogy	Release: January 29, 2013; Label: Mishka NYC; Format: Digital download	
Hunger Pangs	Release: June 18, 2014; Label: Mishka NYC; Format: Digital download	

=== Singles ===
List of singles, showing year released and album name
Title	Year	Album	Ref.
"Streets Talkin" (Bobby Lyte$ featuring Cakes da Killa)	2013	Non-album single	
"Give It to Me" (Astrolith featuring Cakes da Killa)	2014	Muscle Memories	
"Mirror Mirror" (Moonbase Commander featuring Cakes da Killa)	2015	Southpaw	
"Drop Top" (DJ Shiftee featuring Cakes da Killa)	2015	Non-album single	
"Serve It Up" (with Moonbase Commander)	2015	Non-album single	
"Carry On" (Astrolith featuring Cakes da Killa)	2016	Non-album single	
"Up Out My Face" (featuring Peaches)	2016	Hedonism	
"New Phone (Who Dis)"	2016	Hedonism	
"Shots Fired"	2017	Shots Fired X Thirst Trap	
"Thirst Trap"	2017	Shots Fired X Thirst Trap	
"Catch the Beat" (Honey Dijon featuring Cakes da Killa)	2017	The Best of Both Worlds	
"Talkin' Greezy (Remix)" (with Injury Reserve)	2018	Non-album single	
"Don't Make Cents" (with Proper Villains)	2018	Non-album single	
"Bed Rest" (with LSDXOXO)	2018	Non-album single	
"Luv Me Nots"	2019	Non-album single	
"You Could Neva" (with Astrolith & Ripparachie)	2019	Non-album single	
"Pop Shit" (Rafia featuring Cakes da Killa)	2020	Non-album single	
"Free to Be" (with davOmakesbeats)	2020	Non-album single	
"Don Dada"	2020	Muvaland	
"What's the Word" (with Proper Villains)	2021	Muvaland, Vol. 2	
"Taste Test" (with Proper Villains)	2021	Muvaland, Vol. 2	

=== Guest appearances ===
List of guest appearances, with other performing artists, showing year released and album name
Title	Year	Original artist(s)	Album	Ref.
"MayDay"	2011	Rip The Ruler	Downtown Mayhem Vol. 1	
"Black Madonna"	2012	Big Momma	Batteries Not Included	
"380"	2013	Big Momma	Mommie Dearest	
"Whistle" (remix)	2013	DJ Kilbourne	The Club Giant Squid	
"Menea"	2013	P3culiar	Role Play	
"Truth Tella"	2013	LSDXOXO	Softcore	
"Saki Bomb"	2014	Saint	Muscle Memories	
"A Minute with Cakes"	2014	Mykki Blanco	Gay Dog Food	
"Bind That Bitch"	2014	L S D X O X O	W H O R E C O R E	
"Cold Wintour"	2015	L S D X O X O	sacanagem	
"Hot F*ck No Love"	2016	Clipping.	Wriggle	
"What's Goodie"	2016	Injury Reserve	Floss	
"Look at Me"	2018	Madeaux	Burn	
"Catch the Beat" (Derrick's Black Catcher Vocal)	2018	Honey Dijon	Xtra	
"Catch the Beat" (Honey Dijon's I'm Carrying Remix)	2018	Honey Dijon	Xtra	
"GTFU"	2019	Injury Reserve	Injury Reserve	
"Ultimate One" (Remix)	2023	Urias	Her Mind (Blossom Edition)	

== Filmography ==
=== Television ===
List of television appearances, showing year released, role, and director
Year	Title	Role	Notes	Ref.
2014	Cakes Da Killa: No Homo	Himself	Short film, directed by Ja'Tovia Gary	
2019	Rhythm + Flow	Himself	Episode 2	

=== Music videos ===
List of music videos, showing year released and director
Title	Year	Director(s)	Ref.
"Whistle (Beat It Up)"	2012	Alana Peters	
"Cuntspiracy"	2013	Sean Anthony	
"Goodie Goodies"	2013	Ja'Tovia Gary	
"I Run This Club"	2014	ZU	
"Truth Tella"	2014	Minister Akins	
"Give It To Me" (Astrolith featuring Cakes da Killa)	2014	Mark Lovato & Gella Zefira	
"Living Gud, Eating Gud"	2014	Jason Ano	
"Mixed Messages"	2015	Mark Lovato & Gella Zefira	
"Get 2 Werk Remix" (feat. Rye Rye)	2015	Unknown	
"New Phone, Who Dis?"	2016	Noah Breakfast	
"Talkin Greezy"	2016	Nico Bovat	
"Been Dat Did That (360 VR)"	2016	Mark Lovato & Gella Zefira	
"Gon Blow" (featuring Rye Rye)	2017	Unknown	
"Luv Me Nots"	2020	Ohoto NYC	
"DON DADA"	2020	dayday	

== See also ==
- LGBT culture in New York City
- List of LGBT people from New York City
- NYC Pride March
