= Black Sheep (Cakes da Killa album) =

Studio album by Cakes da Killa
- Released: March 22, 2024
- Length: 27:05
- Label: Young Art
- Producer: Samuel Katz

Cakes da Killa chronology
| Svengali (2022) | Black Sheep (2024) |

Singles from Black Sheep
- 1. "Mind Reader" Released: January 24, 2024; 2. "Do Dat Baby" Released: February 23, 2024

Black Sheep is the third studio album by American rapper Cakes da Killa. It was released on March 22, 2024, through Young Art Records.

== Background and singles ==
Black Sheep marks the second collaboration between Cakes da Killa and producer and composer Samuel Katz. Other contributions include Dawn Richard, Wuhryns Dumas and Stout. The record sees the duo at their "most comfortable and confident" with Cakes writing all the lyrics and Katz handling the production. It serves as an hommage to the club life and "cloistered spaces" of Manhattan and Brooklyn as an "artful synthesis" of "audacious" rap and "club-ready" production. The title Black Sheep is a reference to the feeling that the queer rapper has never "landed comfortably" in a specific scene.

Black Sheep is preceded by two singles: "Mind Reader" on January 24, 2024, and "Do Dat Baby" with Dawn Richard on February 23.

== Track listing ==
All lyrics are written by Rashard Caliel Bradshaw; all music is composed by Samuel Katz.

Black Sheep – Standard edition
| No. | Title | Length |
|---|---|---|
| 1. | "It's a Luv Thing" (featuring Wuhryn Dumas) | 2:53 |
| 2. | "Mind Reader" (featuring Stout) | 3:11 |
| 3. | "Make Me Ovah" | 2:40 |
| 4. | "4Play" | 1:04 |
| 5. | "Do Dat Baby" (with Dawn Richard) | 3:07 |
| 6. | "Global Entry" | 1:33 |
| 7. | "Downtown J" | 1:04 |
| 8. | "Cakewalk" | 2:16 |
| 9. | "Crushing in da Club" | 3:10 |
| 10. | "Problems 4 Problems" | 3:06 |
| 11. | "Ain't Shit Sweet" | 3:01 |
| Total length: | | 27:09 |

Black Sheep +
| No. | Title | Length |
|---|---|---|
| 12. | "Black Sheep" | 3:10 |
| 13. | "Chain Gang Pimpin" | 2:07 |
| 14. | "Fly Trap" | 1:06 |
| 15. | "Not Da One" | 0:27 |
| 16. | "Standing Ovation" | 2:23 |
| Total length: | | 36:26 |
