= Hip Hop Since 1978 =

New York City based management and production company

Hip Hop Since 1978 (HHS78) is a management and production company based in New York City. It was started by Gee Roberson and Kyambo "Hip-Hop" Joshua. HHS78 has been involved in the daily operations of Roc-A-Fella Records since the label's inception in the mid-1990s. HHS78 originally signed Kanye West to their production and management company in 1998 and negotiated his signing with Roc-A-Fella Records. HHS78's first official project was West's 2004 album, The College Dropout.

In January 2007, they partnered with Bryant Entertainment. As a result, they managed the careers of Lil Wayne, Drake and Nicki Minaj (who were signed to Young Money/Cash Money Records).

In January 2009, Kyambo Joshua and Columbia Records parted ways. In 2009, HHS78 signed Young Jeezy to their management firm.

As of 2014, the agency no longer exists. At the same time, Kyambo Joshua joined the A&R department at Def Jam Recordings (along with record producer No I.D.), while Gee Roberson has launched other management agencies.

== Clients ==
- Lil Wayne
- Kanye West
- Nicki Minaj
- T.I.
- Drake
- Just Blaze
