= American Music Awards of 2022 =

2022 music awards ceremony

- Date: November 20, 2022
- Venue: Microsoft Theater, Los Angeles, California
- Country: United States
- Hosted by: Wayne Brady

Highlights
- Most wins: Taylor Swift (6)
- Most nominations: Bad Bunny (8)
- Website: theamas.com

Television/radio coverage
- Network: ABC, Hulu
- Viewership: 3.3 million
- Produced by: Dick Clark Productions; Jesse Collins Entertainment

The 50th Annual American Music Awards were held on November 20, 2022, at the Microsoft Theater in Los Angeles, in recognition of the most popular artists, songs, and albums of 2022. Wayne Brady hosted the ceremony, which aired live on ABC and was streamed the next day on Hulu.

Nominations were announced on October 13, 2022. Four new categories were introduced this year: Favorite Afrobeats Artist, Favorite K-pop Artist, Favorite Rock Song, and Favorite Rock Album. Bad Bunny led the nominations overall with eight while Beyoncé and Taylor Swift were the most-nominated female artists with six each. Imagine Dragons and Måneskin were the most-nominated groups, with four each.

Swift won all six of her nominations, including Artist of the Year, and extended her record as the most-awarded artist in AMA history, with 40 wins overall. A special award, Song of Soul, was presented to Yola. Lionel Richie was honored with the Icon Award.

This was the final American Music Awards to air on ABC. Starting in 2025, the ceremony aired on CBS and streamed on Paramount+.

== Background and broadcast ==
On September 15, 2022, Dick Clark Productions (DCP) and ABC announced that the 50th American Music Awards (AMAS) would be held on November 20 at the Microsoft Theater in Los Angeles, with Jesse Collins executive producing the show together with Dionne Harmon and Jeannae Rouzan-Clay, and Larry Klein as producer. Tickets for the show went on sale on October 7 via AXS.com. Nominations were revealed on October 13. The show aired live on ABC and was made available for streaming the day after on Hulu.

The ceremony recorded the lowest-ever viewership in the history of the awards, with an audience of 3.3 million. It earned a 0.6 demo rating, marking a significant drop compared to the previous year's 3.8 million audience and 1.0 rating.

== Performances ==
Performers were announced on October 31 and November 14, 2022. D-Nice served as the house DJ. Yola, GloRilla, Dove Cameron, and Anitta made their AMAs performance debuts at the show. Pink performed twice: first as the show's opening act, and later to sing "Hopelessly Devoted to You" in tribute to Olivia Newton-John following her death in August 2022. As the recipient of the inaugural Song of Soul award, Yola performed her song "Break the Bough", from the 2022 film Elvis. Stevie Wonder and Charlie Puth performed a special extended medley of select Lionel Richie songs in honor of the singer being the year's Icon Award recipient. They were eventually joined onstage by several other artists including Ari Lennox, Melissa Etheridge, Yola, and Smokey Robinson. Though Tems, WizKid, and Richie were originally announced as performers, they did not perform on the show.

On November 21, Chris Brown shared a video clip on Instagram of a rehearsal for a tribute performance he had originally prepared for the show in honor of the 40th anniversary of Michael Jackson's Thriller (1982). Brown revealed that it had been cancelled by the AMAS "for reasons unknown" the day before the show was set to air. In response, a spokesperson for DCP stated that the cancellation was due to "creative direction" and not any fault of Brown's. He would have been joined by Ciara for the performance.

List of musical performances
Artist(s)	Song(s)
Pink	"Never Gonna Not Dance Again"
Bebe Rexha	"I'm Good (Blue)"
Anitta	"Envolver" "Lobby" (with Missy Elliott)
Carrie Underwood	"Crazy Angels"
GloRilla; Cardi B (Note: Cardi B's appearance was not previously announced)	"Tomorrow"
Imagine Dragons	"Bones" "Enemy" (with JID)
Pink	Tribute to Olivia Newton-John: "Hopelessly Devoted to You"
Lil Baby	"In a Minute" "California Breeze"
Yola	"Break the Bough"
Dove Cameron	"Boyfriend"
Stevie Wonder; Charlie Puth	Tribute to Lionel Richie "Three Times a Lady" "Easy" "All Night Long (All Night)" "Say You, Say Me" "Brick House" "Jesus is Love" "We Are the World" (with Ari Lennox, Melissa Etheridge, and Yola)

== Presenters ==
Wayne Brady was announced as the show's host on October 24. The full list of presenters was announced via Twitter on November 18.

- Wayne Brady - main host
- Sheryl Lee Ralph – presented New Artist of the Year
- Wayne Brady - introduced Bebe Rexha
- Meghan Trainor – presented Favorite Rock Artist
- Niecy Nash-Betts – presented Favorite Country Duo or Group and introduced Anitta
- Kelly Rowland – presented Favorite Male R&B Artist
- Jimmie Allen and Wayne Brady – paid tribute to Loretta Lynn and introduced Carrie Underwood
- Karrueche Tran – presented Favorite Pop Album
- Wayne Brady - introduced GloRilla & Cardi B
- Ellie Goulding – presented Favorite Female Latin Artist
- Latto – presented Favorite Afrobeats Artist
- Wayne Brady - introduced Imagine Dragons & J.I.D.
- Jessie James Decker and Roselyn Sánchez – presented Favorite Rock Song
- Melissa Etheridge – introduced Pink (for Newton-John tribute)
- Wayne Brady - introduced Lil Baby
- Liza Koshy – presented Favorite Hip-Hop Song
- Sabrina Carpenter and Dustin Lynch – presented Favorite Music Video
- Wayne Brady - introduced Yola
- Kim Petras – presented Favorite Pop Song
- Wayne Brady - introduced Dove Cameron
- Dan + Shay – presented Artist of the Year
- Smokey Robinson – introduced Lionel Richie (for the Icon Award presentation)
- Wayne Brady - closes the show

== Winners and nominees ==
Nominees were selected from among the most popular artists and music releases within the period dated September 24, 2021, through September 22, 2022. Nominations were released the following month, on October 13, with Becky G announcing the contenders for New Artist of the Year on Good Morning America. Nominees for all other categories were shared via the AMAs Twitter account. Bad Bunny received the most nominations of any artist with eight, including his first for Artist of the Year. Taylor Swift received a record-extending ninth nomination in the same category, which comprised seven nominees this year. Swift, Beyoncé, and Drake received six nominations each, with the first two being the most-nominated female artists. Imagine Dragons and Måneskin were tied for the most group nominations with four each. Over 40 artists were first-time nominees, including Anitta, Jack Harlow, Latto, and Tems. Elton John received two nominations, for Collaboration of the Year and Favourite Touring Artist, setting the record as the longest-recognized artist in AMA history to date, he was first nominated at the inaugural ceremony in 1974.

Voting in all categories, except Favorite K-pop Artist, opened the same day nominations were announced and took place on the AMAs website and Twitter. Four new categories were added this year: Favorite Afrobeats and K-pop Artist respectively, Favorite Rock Song, and Favorite Rock Album. The awards for Favorite Soundtrack and Favorite Touring Artist were restored to the roster following the reopening of theatres and resumption of touring after pandemic restrictions lifted earlier in the year. Favorite Trending Song was removed. Voting for Favorite K-pop Artist began on November 1 and took place on the aforementioned platforms, as well as on the newly launched AMAs Discord server. It is the only category for which voting continued through show day (all other categories closed on November 14) ending an hour into the ceremony.

Winners for 25 untelevised awards were announced prior to the ceremony, through a Twitter and Discord audio livestream hosted by Tetris Kelly of Billboard, Tiffany Taylor of The Hollywood Reporter, and K-pop singer Mark Tuan. The rest were revealed during the live television broadcast. Swift went on to become the most-awarded artist of the night, winning all six of her nominations, including Artist of the Year. She extended her record as the most-most-awarded artist in the history of the ceremony with 40 wins overall. John won his nomination for Collaboration of the Year, marking his first win since 1988. A new award, Song of Soul, which "spotlights an emerging, mission-driven artist who has inspired change and invoked social justice through their lyrics", was presented to Yola for her song "Break the Bough", from the Elvis soundtrack. Lionel Richie was presented with the Icon Award.

Winners are listed first and highlighted in bold.

Artist of the Year	New Artist of the Year
**Taylor Swift**; Adele; Bad Bunny; Beyoncé; Drake; Harry Styles; The Weeknd	**Dove Cameron**; Gayle; Steve Lacy; Latto; Måneskin
Collaboration of the Year	Favorite Touring Artist
**Elton John and Dua Lipa – "Cold Heart (Pnau remix)"**; Future featuring Drake and Tems – "Wait For U"; Carolina Gaitán, Mauro Castillo, Adassa, Rhenzy Feliz, Diane Guerrero, Stephanie Beatriz, and the Encanto Cast – "We Don’t Talk About Bruno"; The Kid Laroi and Justin Bieber – "Stay"; Lil Nas X featuring Jack Harlow – "Industry Baby"	**Coldplay**; Bad Bunny; Elton John; The Rolling Stones; Ed Sheeran
Favorite Music Video	Favorite Male Pop Artist
**Taylor Swift – All Too Well: The Short Film**; Adele – "Easy on Me"; Bad Bunny featuring Chencho Corleone – "Me Porto Bonito"; Lil Nas X featuring Jack Harlow – "Industry Baby"; Harry Styles – "As It Was"	**Harry Styles**; Bad Bunny; Drake; Ed Sheeran; The Weeknd
Favorite Female Pop Artist	Favorite Pop Duo or Group
**Taylor Swift**; Adele; Beyoncé; Doja Cat; Lizzo	**BTS**; Coldplay; Imagine Dragons; Måneskin; OneRepublic
Favorite Pop Album	Favorite Pop Song
**Taylor Swift – Red (Taylor's Version)**; Adele – 30; Bad Bunny – Un Verano Sin Ti; Beyoncé – Renaissance; Harry Styles – Harry's House; The Weeknd – Dawn FM	**Harry Styles – "As It Was"**; Adele – "Easy on Me"; Carolina Gaitán, Mauro Castillo, Adassa, Rhenzy Feliz, Diane Guerrero, Stephanie Beatriz and the Encanto Cast – "We Don't Talk About Bruno"; The Kid Laroi and Justin Bieber – "Stay"; Lizzo – "About Damn Time"
Favorite Male Country Artist	Favorite Female Country Artist
**Morgan Wallen**; Luke Combs; Walker Hayes; Cody Johnson; Chris Stapleton	**Taylor Swift**; Miranda Lambert; Maren Morris; Carrie Underwood; Lainey Wilson
Favorite Country Duo or Group	Favorite Country Album
**Dan + Shay**; Lady A; Old Dominion; Parmalee; Zac Brown Band	**Taylor Swift – Red (Taylor's Version)**; Luke Combs – Growin' Up; Walker Hayes – Country Stuff: The Album; Cody Johnson – Human: The Double Album; Carrie Underwood – Denim & Rhinestones
Favorite Country Song	Favorite Male Hip-Hop Artist
**Morgan Wallen – "Wasted on You"**; Jordan Davis featuring Luke Bryan – "Buy Dirt"; Cody Johnson – "'Til You Can't"; Dustin Lynch featuring MacKenzie Porter – "Thinking 'Bout You"; Chris Stapleton – "You Should Probably Leave"	**Kendrick Lamar**; Drake; Future; Lil Baby; Lil Durk
Favorite Female Hip-Hop Artist	Favorite Hip-Hop Album
**Nicki Minaj**; Cardi B; GloRilla; Latto; Megan Thee Stallion	**Kendrick Lamar – Mr. Morale & the Big Steppers**; Future – I Never Liked You; Gunna – DS4Ever; Lil Durk – 7220; Polo G – Hall of Fame 2.0
Favorite Hip-Hop Song	Favorite Male R&B Artist
**Future featuring Drake and Tems – "Wait For U"**; Jack Harlow – "First Class"; Kodak Black – "Super Gremlin"; Latto – "Big Energy"; Lil Nas X featuring Jack Harlow – "Industry Baby"	**Chris Brown**; Brent Faiyaz; Givēon; Lucky Daye; The Weeknd
Favorite Female R&B Artist	Favorite R&B Album
**Beyoncé**; Doja Cat; Muni Long; SZA; Summer Walker	**Beyoncé – Renaissance**; Drake – Honestly, Nevermind; Silk Sonic (Bruno Mars & Anderson .Paak) – An Evening with Silk Sonic; Summer Walker – Still Over It; The Weeknd – Dawn FM
Favorite R&B Song	Favorite Male Latin Artist
**Wizkid featuring Tems – "Essence"**; Beyoncé – "Break My Soul"; Muni Long – "Hrs And Hrs"; Silk Sonic (Bruno Mars & Anderson .Paak) – "Smokin out the Window"; SZA – "I Hate U"	**Bad Bunny**; Farruko; J Balvin; Jhayco; Rauw Alejandro
Favorite Female Latin Artist	Favorite Latin Duo or Group
**Anitta**; Becky G; Kali Uchis; Karol G; Rosalía	**Yahritza y Su Esencia**; Banda MS de Sergio Lizárraga; Calibre 50; Eslabon Armado; Grupo Firme
Favorite Latin Album	Favorite Latin Song
**Bad Bunny – Un Verano Sin Ti**; Farruko – La 167; J Balvin – Jose; Rauw Alejandro – Vice Versa; Rosalía – Motomami	**Sebastián Yatra – "Dos Oruguitas"**; Bad Bunny featuring Chencho Corleone – "Me Porto Bonito"; Becky G x Karol G – "Mamiii"; Karol G – "Provenza"; Rauw Alejandro – "Todo de Ti"
Favorite Rock Artist	Favorite Rock Song
**Machine Gun Kelly**; Imagine Dragons; The Lumineers; Måneskin; Red Hot Chili Peppers	**Måneskin – "Beggin'"**; Kate Bush – "Running Up That Hill (A Deal with God)"; Foo Fighters – "Love Dies Young"; Imagine Dragons x JID – "Enemy"; Red Hot Chili Peppers – "Black Summer"
Favorite Rock Album	Favorite Inspirational Artist
**Ghost – Impera**; Coldplay – Music of the Spheres; Imagine Dragons – Mercury – Act 1; Machine Gun Kelly – Mainstream Sellout; Red Hot Chili Peppers – Unlimited Love	**For King & Country**; Katy Nichole; Matthew West; Phil Wickham; Anne Wilson
Favorite Gospel Artist	Favorite Dance/Electronic Artist
**Tamela Mann**; DOE; Maverick City Music; E. Dewey Smith; CeCe Winans	**Marshmello**; The Chainsmokers; Diplo; Swedish House Mafia; Tiësto
Favorite Soundtrack	Favorite Afrobeats Artist
**Elvis**; Encanto; Sing 2; Stranger Things: Soundtrack from the Netflix Series, Season 4; Top Gun: Maverick	**Wizkid**; Burna Boy; CKay; Fireboy DML; Tems
Favorite K-pop Artist	Song of Soul
**BTS**; Blackpink; Seventeen; Tomorrow X Together; Twice	**Yola** – "Break the Bough"
Icon Award
**Lionel Richie**
