= American Music Awards of 2016 =

Award ceremony

44th Annual American Music Awards
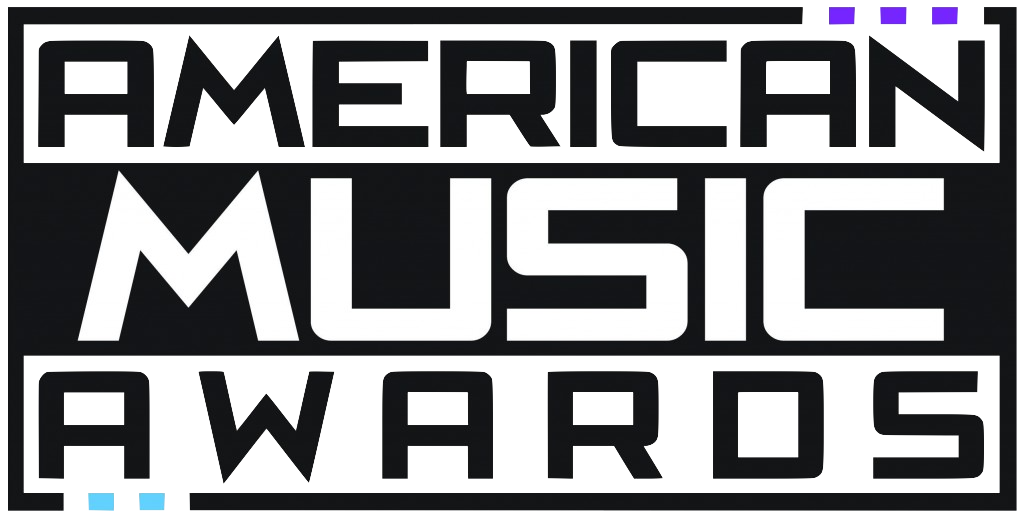
- American Music Awards logo
- Date: November 20, 2016
- Location: Microsoft Theater; Los Angeles, California
- Country: United States
- Hosted by: Gigi Hadid; Jay Pharoah

Highlights
- Most awards: Drake; Justin Bieber (4 each)
- Most nominations: Drake (12)
- Website: ABC-American Music Awards

Television/radio coverage
- Network: ABC
- Runtime: 180 minutes
- Viewership: 11.4 million
- Produced by: Dick Clark Productions

The 44th Annual American Music Awards took place on November 20, 2016, at the Microsoft Theater in Los Angeles. It was broadcast on ABC and was hosted by Gigi Hadid and Jay Pharoah. The 2016 AMAs fell 31% from 2015 among adults 18-49 and 26% among viewers, to 8.2 million watching the show, which was an all-time low in the show's history.

== Performances ==
Artist(s)	Song(s)	Ref.
Bruno Mars	"24K Magic"	
Niall Horan	"This Town"	
Fifth Harmony	"That's My Girl"	
The Chainsmokers; Halsey; Travis Barker	"Closer"	
James Bay	"Let It Go"	
Shawn Mendes	"Treat You Better" "Mercy"	
The Weeknd	"Starboy"	
Ariana Grande; Nicki Minaj	"Side to Side"	
John Legend	"Love Me Now"	
Twenty One Pilots	"Heathens" "Stressed Out"	
DJ Snake; Justin Bieber	"Let Me Love You"	
Lady Gaga	"Million Reasons"	
Green Day	"Bang Bang"	
Sting	"I Can't Stop Thinking About You" "Message in a Bottle" "Every Breath You Take"	
DJ Khaled; Nicki Minaj; Rick Ross; Future; August Alsina	"Do You Mind"	
Maroon 5 Kendrick Lamar	"Don't Wanna Know"	

== Presenters ==
- Octavia Spencer, Janelle Monae & Taraji P. Henson presented Favorite Duo/Group - Pop/Rock
- Erin Foster & Sara Foster introduced Niall Horan
- Nina Dobrev & Julianne Hough presented Favorite Album - Rap/Hip-Hop
- Bebe Rexha & Gigi Gorgeous introduced Shawn Mendes
- Ciara presented Favortie Artist - EDM
- Savvy Shields & Florida Georgia Line presented Collaboration of The Year
- TJ Miller & Olivia Munn presented Favorite Song - Country
- Karlie Kloss introduced Ariana Grande & Nicki Minaj
- Teyana Taylor & Bryce Harper presented New Artist of the Year unleashed by T-Mobile
- Chrissy Teigen introduced John Legend
- Milla Jovovich introduced Twenty One Pilots
- Keke Palmer & Steven Yeun presented Favorite Artist - Rap/Hip-Hop
- Rachel Platten & Bella Thorne introduced Justin Bieber
- Rebecca Romijn & Heidi Klum presented Favorite Soundtrack
- Matt Bomer introduced Lady Gaga
- Mark Cuban & Idina Menzel presented Favorite Duo/Group - Country
- Zoe Saldaña presented Favorite Artist - Alternative Rock
- Robert Downey Jr. introduced Sting and presented the Award of Merit
- Hailee Steinfeld & Blake Jenner presented Favorite Female Artist - Pop/Rock
- Donnie Wahlberg & Jenny McCarthy presented Artist of the Year
- Hannah Jeter introduced Maroon 5 & Kendrick Lamar

=== Red Carpet ===
==== Performers ====
- Emeli Sandé
- Spencer Ludwig

==== Hosts ====
- Bailee Madison
- Jeannie Mai
- Laura Marano
- George Kotsiopoulos
- Rocsi Diaz
- Roshon Fegan
- Kira Kazantsev
- Tinashe

== Winners and nominees ==
The nominations were announced on October 10, 2016. The winners are in bold.

Artist of the Year	New Artist of the Year
**Ariana Grande**; Selena Gomez; Justin Bieber; Rihanna; Carrie Underwood	**Zayn**; Alessia Cara; DNCE; Shawn Mendes; The Chainsmokers
Favorite Pop/Rock Male Artist	Favorite Pop/Rock Female Artist
**Justin Bieber**; Drake; The Weeknd	**Selena Gomez**; Adele; Rihanna
Favorite Pop/Rock Band/Duo/Group	Favorite Pop/Rock Album
**Twenty One Pilots**; DNCE; The Chainsmokers	**Purpose – Justin Bieber**; 25 – Adele; Views – Drake
Favorite Pop/Rock Song	Favorite Country Male Artist
**"Love Yourself" – Justin Bieber**; "Hello" – Adele; "One Dance" − Drake featuring Wizkid and Kyla	**Blake Shelton**; Luke Bryan; Thomas Rhett
Favorite Country Female Artist	Favorite Country Duo or Group
**Carrie Underwood**; Kelsea Ballerini; Cam	**Florida Georgia Line**; Old Dominion; Zac Brown Band
Favorite Country Album	Favorite Country Song
**Storyteller – Carrie Underwood**; Kill the Lights – Luke Bryan; Traveller – Chris Stapleton	**"Humble and Kind" – Tim McGraw**; "H.O.L.Y." – Florida Georgia Line; "Die a Happy Man" – Thomas Rhett
Favorite Rap/Hip-Hop Artist	Favorite Rap/Hip-Hop Album
**Drake**; Fetty Wap; Future	**Views – Drake**; What a Time to Be Alive – Drake and Future; Fetty Wap – Fetty Wap
Favorite Rap/Hip-Hop Song	Favorite Soul/R&B Male Artist
**"Hotline Bling" – Drake**; "Panda" – Desiigner; "679" – Fetty Wap	**Chris Brown**; Bryson Tiller; The Weeknd
Favorite Soul/R&B Female Artist	Favorite Soul/R&B Album
**Rihanna**; Beyoncé; Janet Jackson	**Anti – Rihanna**; Lemonade – Beyoncé; Trapsoul – Bryson Tiller
Favorite Soul/R&B Song	Favorite Alternative Artist
**"Work" – Rihanna featuring Drake**; "One Dance" − Drake featuring Wizkid and Kyla; "Don't" – Bryson Tiller	**Twenty One Pilots**; Coldplay; X Ambassadors
Favorite Adult Contemporary Artist	Favorite Latin Artist
**Adele**; Rachel Platten; Meghan Trainor	**Enrique Iglesias**; J Balvin; Nicky Jam
Favorite Contemporary Inspirational Artist	Favorite Electronic Dance Music Artist
**Hillsong United**; Lauren Daigle; Chris Tomlin	**The Chainsmokers**; Calvin Harris; Major Lazer
Video of the Year	Top Soundtrack
**"Sorry" - Justin Bieber**; "Panda" – Desiigner; "Work – Rihanna featuring Drake	**Purple Rain**; Suicide Squad; Star Wars: The Force Awakens
Collaboration of the Year	Tour of the Year
**"Work from Home" – Fifth Harmony featuring Ty Dolla Sign**; "Don't Let Me Down" – The Chainsmokers featuring Daya; "One Dance" − Drake featuring Wizkid and Kyla; "Work" – Rihanna featuring Drake; "Like I'm Gonna Lose You" – Meghan Trainor featuring John Legend	**The Formation World Tour – Beyoncé**; Rebel Heart Tour – Madonna; The River Tour 2016 – Bruce Springsteen and the E Street Band

== Special awards ==
Award of Merit

- Sting
