= American Music Award for Favorite Contemporary Inspirational Artist =

American Music Award

American Music Awards for Favorite Contemporary Inspirational Artist
- Country: United States
- Presented by: American Music Awards
- First award: 2002
- Final award: 2022
- Currently held by: For King & Country

Highlights
- Most wins: Casting Crowns; Lauren Daigle (4 each)
- Most nominations: Casting Crowns (8)
- Website: theamas.com

The American Music Award for Favorite Artist – Contemporary Inspirational has been awarded since 2002. Years reflect the year in which the awards were presented, for works released in the previous year. (Until 2003 and onward awards were handed out in November of the same year.) The all-time winners in this category are Casting Crowns and Lauren Daigle with four wins each. Casting Crowns is the most nominated act with eight nominations.

== Winners and nominees ==
=== 2000s ===
Year	Artist	Ref
2002 (29th)
2002 (29th)	Yolanda Adams	
2002 (29th)	Steven Curtis Chapman	
2002 (29th)	Donnie McClurkin	
2003 (30th)
2003 (30th)	Avalon	
2003 (30th)	Jars of Clay	
2003 (30th)	P.O.D.	
2003 (31st)
2003 (31st)	Steven Curtis Chapman	
2003 (31st)	MercyMe	
2003 (31st)	Third Day	
2004 (32nd)
2004 (32nd)	MercyMe	
2004 (32nd)	Steven Curtis Chapman	
2004 (32nd)	Third Day	
2005 (33rd)
2005 (33rd)	Mary Mary	
2005 (33rd)	Casting Crowns	
2005 (33rd)	Jars of Clay	
2006 (34th)
2006 (34th)	Kirk Franklin	
2006 (34th)	Aly & AJ	
2006 (34th)	Casting Crowns	
2007 (35th)
2007 (35th)	Casting Crowns	
2007 (35th)	Jeremy Camp	
2007 (35th)	tobyMac	
2008 (36th)
2008 (36th)	Third Day	
2008 (36th)	Casting Crowns	
2008 (36th)	MercyMe	
2009 (37th)
2009 (37th)	Mary Mary	
2009 (37th)	Jeremy Camp	
2009 (37th)	Brandon Heath	

=== 2010s ===
Year	Artist	Ref
2010 (38th)
2010 (38th)	MercyMe	
2010 (38th)	Casting Crowns	
2010 (38th)	tobyMac	
2011 (39th)
2011 (39th)	Casting Crowns	
2011 (39th)	Third Day	
2011 (39th)	tobyMac	
2012 (40th)
2012 (40th)	tobyMac	
2012 (40th)	Jeremy Camp	
2012 (40th)	Newsboys	
2013 (41st)
2013 (41st)	Matthew West	
2013 (41st)	tobyMac	
2013 (41st)	Chris Tomlin	
2014 (42nd)
2014 (42nd)	Casting Crowns	
2014 (42nd)	Hillsong United	
2014 (42nd)	Newsboys	
2015 (43rd)
2015 (43rd)	Casting Crowns	
2015 (43rd)	Hillsong United	
2015 (43rd)	MercyMe	
2016 (44th)
2016 (44th)	Hillsong United	
2016 (44th)	Lauren Daigle	
2016 (44th)	Chris Tomlin	
2017 (45th)
2017 (45th)	Lauren Daigle	
2017 (45th)	MercyMe	
2017 (45th)	Chris Tomlin	
2018 (46th)
2018 (46th)	Lauren Daigle	
2018 (46th)	MercyMe	
2018 (46th)	Zach Williams	
2019 (47th)
2019 (47th)	Lauren Daigle	
2019 (47th)	MercyMe	
2019 (47th)	For King & Country	

=== 2020s ===
Year	Artist	Ref
2020 (48th)
2020 (48th)	Lauren Daigle	
2020 (48th)	For King & Country	
2020 (48th)	Kanye West	
2021 (49th)
2021 (49th)	Carrie Underwood	
2021 (49th)	Cain	
2021 (49th)	Elevation Worship	
2021 (49th)	Lauren Daigle	
2021 (49th)	Zach Williams	
2022 (50th)
2022 (50th)	For King & Country	
2022 (50th)	Katy Nichole	
2022 (50th)	Matthew West	
2022 (50th)	Phil Wickham	
2022 (50th)	Anne Wilson	

== Category facts ==
=== Multiple wins ===
Four wins

- Casting Crowns
- Lauren Daigle (Consecutive)

Two wins

- Mary Mary
- MercyMe

=== Multiple nominations ===
Eight nominations

- Casting Crowns

Six nominations

- MercyMe
- Lauren Daigle

Five nominations

- tobyMac

Four nominations

- Third Day

Three nominations

- Jeremy Camp
- Steven Curtis Chapman
- Hillsong United
- Chris Tomlin

Two nominations

- Jars of Clay
- Mary Mary
- Newsboys

== See also ==
- List of religion-related awards
