= American Music Award for Artist of the Year =

Winners and nominees for AMA Artist of the Year

American Music Awards for Artist of the Year
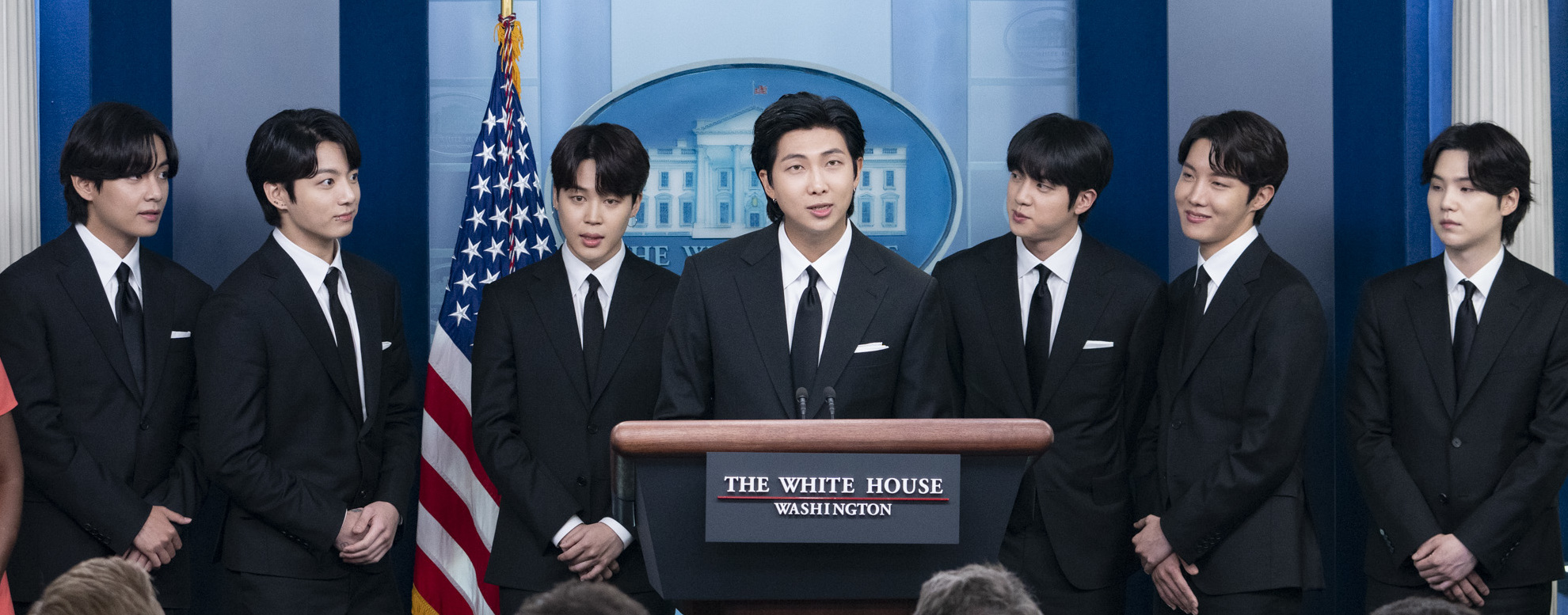
- BTS is the most recent recipient
- Country: United States
- Presented by: American Music Awards
- First award: 1996
- Currently held by: BTS

Highlights
- Most wins: Taylor Swift (7)
- Most nominations: Taylor Swift (11)
- Website: theamas.com

The American Music Award for Artist of the Year, which is the most prestigious award of the night, has been awarded since 1996. Years reflect the year during which the awards were presented, for works released in the previous year (until 2003 onward, when awards were handed out on November of the same year). Taylor Swift is the most nominated and awarded artist in the category, with 7 wins from 10 nominations. Swift was the first artist to be nominated in the category for five consecutive years and the only act to win for three consecutive years.

== Winners and nominees ==
=== 1990s ===
Year	Artist	Ref
1996 (23rd)
1996 (23rd)	Garth Brooks (Refused)	
1996 (23rd)	TLC (Accepted)	
1996 (23rd)	Boyz II Men	
1996 (23rd)	Green Day	
1996 (23rd)	Hootie & the Blowfish	
1997 – 98	—N/a	
1999 (26th)
1999 (26th)	Garth Brooks	
1999 (26th)	Celine Dion (2nd place)	
1999 (26th)	Shania Twain (3rd place)	
1999 (26th)	Backstreet Boys (4th place)	
1999 (26th)	Metallica (5th place)	

=== 2000s ===
Year	Artist	Ref
2000	—N/a	
2001 (28th)
2001 (28th)	NSYNC	
2001 (28th)	Britney Spears	
2001 (28th)	Creed	
2001 (28th)	Destiny's Child	
2001 (28th)	Eminem	
2001 (28th)	Faith Hill	
2002 (29th)
2002 (29th)	U2	
2002 (29th)	Destiny's Child	
2002 (29th)	Janet Jackson	
2002 (29th)	Alicia Keys	
2002 (29th)	Tim McGraw	
2002 (29th)	Shaggy	
2003	—N/a	
2003 (31st)
2003 (31st)	Madonna	
2003 (31st)	Christina Aguilera	
2003 (31st)	Cher	
2003 (31st)	Justin Timberlake	
2003 (31st)	Shania Twain	
2004 (32nd)
2004 (32nd)	Kenny Chesney	
2004 (32nd)	Evanescence	
2004 (32nd)	Norah Jones	
2004 (32nd)	Outkast	
2004 (32nd)	Usher	
2005 (33rd)
2005 (33rd)	Kelly Clarkson	
2005 (33rd)	50 Cent	
2005 (33rd)	Mariah Carey	
2005 (33rd)	Green Day	
2005 (33rd)	Toby Keith	
2005 (33rd)	Gwen Stefani	
2006 (34th)
2006 (34th)	Rascal Flatts	
2006 (34th)	Beyoncé	
2006 (34th)	Mary J. Blige	
2006 (34th)	Daniel Powter	
2006 (34th)	The Pussycat Dolls	
2007 (35th)
2007 (35th)	Carrie Underwood	
2007 (35th)	Akon	
2007 (35th)	Daughtry	
2007 (35th)	Fergie	
2007 (35th)	Norah Jones	
2008 (36th)
2008 (36th)	Chris Brown	
2008 (36th)	Coldplay	
2008 (36th)	Eagles	
2008 (36th)	Alicia Keys	
2008 (36th)	Lil Wayne	
2009 (37th)
2009 (37th)	Taylor Swift	
2009 (37th)	Eminem	
2009 (37th)	Michael Jackson	
2009 (37th)	Kings of Leon	
2009 (37th)	Lady Gaga	

=== 2010s ===
Year	Artist	Ref
2010 (38th)
2010 (38th)	Justin Bieber	
2010 (38th)	Eminem	
2010 (38th)	Kesha	
2010 (38th)	Lady Gaga	
2010 (38th)	Katy Perry	
2011 (39th)
2011 (39th)	Taylor Swift	
2011 (39th)	Adele	
2011 (39th)	Lady Gaga	
2011 (39th)	Lil Wayne	
2011 (39th)	Katy Perry	
2012 (40th)
2012 (40th)	Justin Bieber	
2012 (40th)	Drake	
2012 (40th)	Maroon 5	
2012 (40th)	Katy Perry	
2012 (40th)	Rihanna	
2013 (41st)
2013 (41st)	Taylor Swift	
2013 (41st)	Macklemore & Ryan Lewis	
2013 (41st)	Bruno Mars	
2013 (41st)	Rihanna	
2013 (41st)	Justin Timberlake	
2014 (42nd)
2014 (42nd)	One Direction	
2014 (42nd)	Iggy Azalea	
2014 (42nd)	Beyoncé	
2014 (42nd)	Luke Bryan	
2014 (42nd)	Katy Perry	
2015 (43rd)
2015 (43rd)	One Direction	
2015 (43rd)	Luke Bryan	
2015 (43rd)	Ariana Grande	
2015 (43rd)	Nicki Minaj	
2015 (43rd)	Taylor Swift	
2016 (44th)
2016 (44th)	Ariana Grande	
2016 (44th)	Justin Bieber	
2016 (44th)	Selena Gomez	
2016 (44th)	Rihanna	
2016 (44th)	Carrie Underwood	
2017 (45th)
2017 (45th)	Bruno Mars	
2017 (45th)	The Chainsmokers	
2017 (45th)	Drake	
2017 (45th)	Kendrick Lamar	
2017 (45th)	Ed Sheeran	
2018 (46th)
2018 (46th)	Taylor Swift	
2018 (46th)	Drake	
2018 (46th)	Ed Sheeran	
2018 (46th)	Imagine Dragons	
2018 (46th)	Post Malone	
2019 (47th)
2019 (47th)	Taylor Swift	
2019 (47th)	Ariana Grande	
2019 (47th)	Drake	
2019 (47th)	Halsey	
2019 (47th)	Post Malone	

=== 2020s ===
Year	Artist	Ref
2020 (48th)
2020 (48th)	Taylor Swift	
2020 (48th)	Justin Bieber	
2020 (48th)	Post Malone	
2020 (48th)	Roddy Ricch	
2020 (48th)	The Weeknd	
2021 (49th)
2021 (49th)	BTS	
2021 (49th)	Ariana Grande	
2021 (49th)	Drake	
2021 (49th)	Olivia Rodrigo	
2021 (49th)	Taylor Swift	
2021 (49th)	The Weeknd	
2022 (50th)
2022 (50th)	Taylor Swift	
2022 (50th)	Adele	
2022 (50th)	Bad Bunny	
2022 (50th)	Beyoncé	
2022 (50th)	Drake	
2022 (50th)	Harry Styles	
2022 (50th)	The Weeknd	
2023 – 24	—N/a	
2025 (51st)
2025 (51st)	Billie Eilish	
2025 (51st)	Ariana Grande	
2025 (51st)	Chappell Roan	
2025 (51st)	Kendrick Lamar	
2025 (51st)	Morgan Wallen	
2025 (51st)	Post Malone	
2025 (51st)	Sabrina Carpenter	
2025 (51st)	SZA	
2025 (51st)	Taylor Swift	
2025 (51st)	Zach Bryan	
2026 (52nd)
2026 (52nd)	BTS	
2026 (52nd)	Bad Bunny	
2026 (52nd)	Bruno Mars	
2026 (52nd)	Harry Styles	
2026 (52nd)	Justin Bieber	
2026 (52nd)	Kendrick Lamar	
2026 (52nd)	Lady Gaga	
2026 (52nd)	Morgan Wallen	
2026 (52nd)	Sabrina Carpenter	
2026 (52nd)	Taylor Swift	

== Multiple wins ==
Rank	Artist	Wins	Years
1.	Taylor Swift	7 wins	2009, 2011, 2013, 2018, 2019, 2020 and 2022
2.	BTS	2 wins	2021 and 2026
2.	Justin Bieber	2 wins	2010 and 2012
2.	One Direction	2 wins	2014 and 2015

== Multiple nominations ==
11 nominations

- Taylor Swift

5 nominations

- Justin Bieber
- Drake
- Ariana Grande

4 nominations

- Lady Gaga
- Post Malone
- Katy Perry

3 nominations

- Beyoncé
- Eminem
- Kendrick Lamar
- Bruno Mars
- Rihanna
- Ed Sheeran
- The Weeknd

2 nominations

- Bad Bunny
- BTS
- Luke Bryan
- Sabrina Carpenter
- Destiny's Child
- Green Day
- One Direction
- Norah Jones
- Alicia Keys
- Harry Styles
- Justin Timberlake
- Carrie Underwood
- Morgan Wallen
- Lil Wayne
