= American Music Award for Best R&B Album =

Music award category

American Music Awards for Best R&B Album
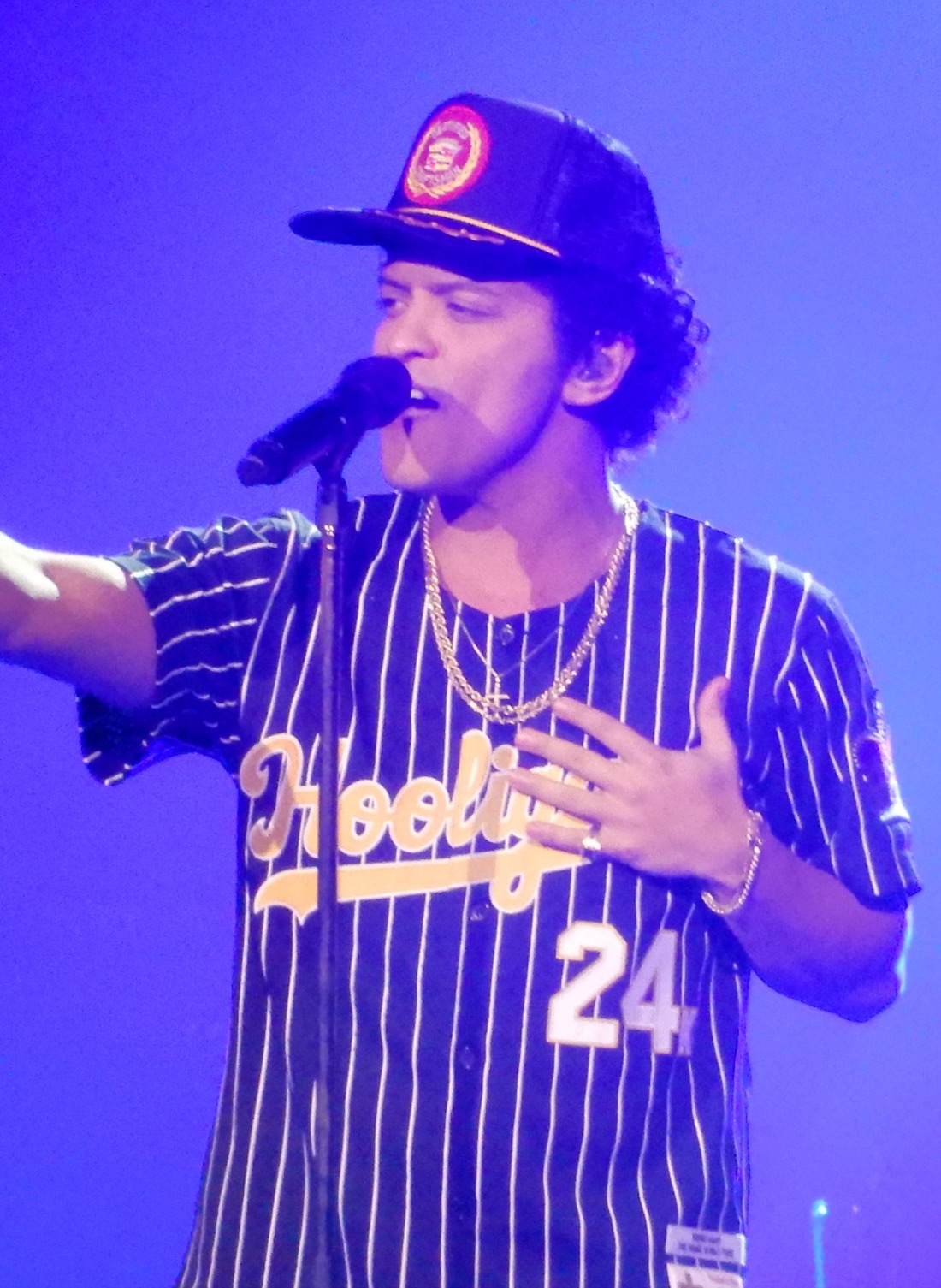
- The Romantic by Bruno Mars is the most recent recipient.
- Country: United States
- Presented by: American Music Awards
- First award: 1974
- Currently held by: Bruno Mars – The Romantic

Highlights
- Most wins: Michael Jackson (4)
- Most nominations: Beyoncé (7)
- Website: theamas.com

The American Music Award for Best R&B Album has been awarded since 1974. Years reflect the year in which the awards were presented, for works released in the previous year (until 2003 onward when awards were handed out on November of the same year). The all-time winner in this category is Michael Jackson with 4 wins. Beyoncé has the most nominations with 7. While the start and end dates for the usage of the category Favorite Black Album are unclear, in 1985 the name was used for the award Prince was given for his album Purple Rain. The award was previously known as Favorite Album – Soul/R&B until the 2026 ceremony, where the award was renamed to Best R&B Album.

== Winners and nominees ==
=== 1970s ===
Year	Artist	Album	Ref
1974 (1st)
1974 (1st)	Al Green	I'm Still in Love with You	
1974 (1st)	Marvin Gaye	Let's Get It On	
1974 (1st)	War	The World Is a Ghetto	
1975 (2nd)
1975 (2nd)	Gladys Knight & the Pips	Imagination	
1975 (2nd)	Marvin Gaye	Let's Get It On	
1975 (2nd)	Stevie Wonder	Innervisions	
1976 (3rd)
1976 (3rd)	The Temptations	A Song for You	
1976 (3rd)	Earth, Wind & Fire	That's the Way of the World	
1976 (3rd)	Ohio Players	Five	
1977 (4th)
1977 (4th)	Stevie Wonder	Songs in the Key of Life	
1977 (4th)	Earth, Wind & Fire	Spirit	
1977 (4th)	Earth, Wind & Fire	That's the Way of the World	
1978 (5th)
1978 (5th)	Stevie Wonder	Songs in the Key of Life	
1978 (5th)	Commodores	Commodores	
1978 (5th)	Barry White	Barry White Sings for Someone You Love	
1979 (6th)
1979 (6th)	Bee Gees	Saturday Night Fever	
1979 (6th)	Earth, Wind & Fire	All 'n All	
1979 (6th)	Teddy Pendergrass	Life Is a Song Worth Singing	

=== 1980s ===
Year	Artist	Album	Ref
1980 (7th)
1980 (7th)	Michael Jackson	Off the Wall	
1980 (7th)	Commodores	Midnight Magic	
1980 (7th)	Teddy Pendergrass	Teddy	
1981 (8th)
1981 (8th)	Michael Jackson	Off the Wall	
1981 (8th)	Diana Ross	Diana	
1981 (8th)	Teddy Pendergrass	Teddy	
1982 (9th)
1982 (9th)	Rick James	Street Songs	
1982 (9th)	The Gap Band	The Gap Band III	
1982 (9th)	Quincy Jones	The Dude	
1982 (9th)	Stevie Wonder	Hotter than July	
1983 (10th)
1983 (10th)	Aretha Franklin	Jump to It	
1983 (10th)	Rick James	Throwin' Down	
1983 (10th)	Stevie Wonder	Stevie Wonder's Original Musiquarium I	
1984 (11th)
1984 (11th)	Michael Jackson	Thriller	
1984 (11th)	Gladys Knight & the Pips	Visions	
1984 (11th)	Prince	1999	
1984 (11th)	Lionel Richie	Lionel Richie	
1985 (12th)
1985 (12th)	Prince	Purple Rain	
1985 (12th)	Michael Jackson	Thriller	
1985 (12th)	Lionel Richie	Can't Slow Down	
1986 (13th)
1986 (13th)	Kool & the Gang	Emergency	
1986 (13th)	Whitney Houston	Whitney Houston	
1986 (13th)	Luther Vandross	The Night I Fell in Love	
1987 (14th)
1987 (14th)	Whitney Houston	Whitney Houston	
1987 (14th)	Anita Baker	Rapture	
1987 (14th)	Janet Jackson	Control	
1987 (14th)	Run–D.M.C.	Raising Hell	
1988 (15th)
1988 (15th)	Anita Baker	Rapture	
1988 (15th)	LL Cool J	Bigger and Deffer	
1988 (15th)	Luther Vandross	Give Me the Reason	
1989 (16th)
1989 (16th)	George Michael	Faith	
1989 (16th)	Gladys Knight & the Pips	All Our Love	
1989 (16th)	Keith Sweat	Make It Last Forever	

=== 1990s ===
Year	Artist	Album	Ref
1990 (17th)
1990 (17th)	Bobby Brown	Don't Be Cruel	
1990 (17th)	MC Hammer	Let's Get It Started	
1990 (17th)	Karyn White	Karyn White	
1991 (18th)
1991 (18th)	MC Hammer	Please Hammer, Don't Hurt 'Em	
1991 (18th)	Janet Jackson	Janet Jackson's Rhythm Nation 1814	
1991 (18th)	Quincy Jones	Back on the Block	
1992 (19th)
1992 (19th)	Luther Vandross	Power of Love	
1992 (19th)	Boyz II Men	Cooleyhighharmony	
1992 (19th)	Whitney Houston	I'm Your Baby Tonight	
1992 (19th)	Various Artists	New Jack City	
1993 (20th)
1993 (20th)	En Vogue	Funky Divas	
1993 (20th)	Mariah Carey	MTV Unplugged	
1993 (20th)	Michael Jackson	Dangerous	
1994 (21st)
1994 (21st)	Whitney Houston	The Bodyguard	
1994 (21st)	Janet Jackson	janet	
1994 (21st)	Silk	Lose Control	
1994 (21st)	SWV	It's About Time	
1995 (22nd)
1995 (22nd)	Toni Braxton	Toni Braxton	
1995 (22nd)	Mariah Carey	Music Box	
1995 (22nd)	R. Kelly	12 Play	
1996 (23rd)
1996 (23rd)	Boyz II Men	II	
1996 (23rd)	Mary J. Blige	My Life	
1996 (23rd)	TLC	CrazySexyCool	
1997 (24th)
1997 (24th)	Toni Braxton	Secrets	
1997 (24th)	Mariah Carey	Daydream	
1997 (24th)	Keith Sweat	Keith Sweat	
1998 (25th)
1998 (25th)	Mary J. Blige	Share My World	
1998 (25th)	Erykah Badu	Baduizm	
1998 (25th)	Blackstreet	Another Level	
1998 (25th)	Puff Daddy	No Way Out	
1999 (26th)
1999 (26th)	Will Smith	Big Willie Style	
1999 (26th)	K-Ci & JoJo	Love Always	
1999 (26th)	Brian McKnight	Anytime	

=== 2000s ===
Year	Artist	Album	Ref
2000 (27th)
2000 (27th)	Lauryn Hill	The Miseducation of Lauryn Hill	
2000 (27th)	Whitney Houston	My Love Is Your Love	
2000 (27th)	TLC	FanMail	
2001 (28th)
2001 (28th)	Toni Braxton	The Heat	
2001 (28th)	Destiny's Child	The Writing's on the Wall	
2001 (28th)	Sisqó	Unleash the Dragon	
2002 (29th)
2002 (29th)	Aaliyah	Aaliyah	
2002 (29th)	Alicia Keys	Songs in A Minor	
2002 (29th)	Janet Jackson	All for You	
2003 (30th)
2003 (30th)	Eminem	The Eminem Show	
2003 (30th)	Ashanti	Ashanti	
2003 (30th)	Ludacris	Word of Mouf	
2003 (30th)	Nelly	Nellyville	
2003 (31st)
2003 (31st)	Luther Vandross	Dance with My Father	
2003 (31st)	Ashanti	Chapter II	
2003 (31st)	Beyoncé	Dangerously in Love	
2003 (31st)	R. Kelly	Chocolate Factory	
2004 (32nd)
2004 (32nd)	Usher	Confessions	
2004 (32nd)	Alicia Keys	The Diary of Alicia Keys	
2004 (32nd)	Prince	Musicology	
2005 (33rd)
2005 (33rd)	Destiny's Child	Destiny Fulfilled	
2005 (33rd)	Mariah Carey	The Emancipation of Mimi	
2005 (33rd)	Fantasia	Free Yourself	
2006 (34th)
2006 (34th)	Mary J. Blige	The Breakthrough	
2006 (34th)	Mariah Carey	The Emancipation of Mimi	
2006 (34th)	Jamie Foxx	Unpredictable	
2007 (35th)
2007 (35th)	Justin Timberlake	FutureSex/LoveSounds	
2007 (35th)	Beyoncé	B'Day	
2007 (35th)	R. Kelly	Double Up	
2008 (36th)
2008 (36th)	Alicia Keys	As I Am	
2008 (36th)	Mary J. Blige	Growing Pains	
2008 (36th)	Mariah Carey	E=MC²	
2009 (37th)
2009 (37th)	Michael Jackson	Number Ones	
2009 (37th)	Beyoncé	I Am... Sasha Fierce	
2009 (37th)	The Black Eyed Peas	The E.N.D	

=== 2010s ===
Year	Artist	Album	Ref
2010 (38th)
2010 (38th)	Usher	Raymond v. Raymond	
2010 (38th)	Alicia Keys	The Element of Freedom	
2010 (38th)	Sade	Soldier of Love	
2011 (39th)
2011 (39th)	Rihanna	Loud	
2011 (39th)	Beyoncé	4	
2011 (39th)	Chris Brown	F.A.M.E.	
2012 (40th)
2012 (40th)	Rihanna	Talk That Talk	
2012 (40th)	Chris Brown	Fortune	
2012 (40th)	Usher	Looking 4 Myself	
2013 (41st)
2013 (41st)	Justin Timberlake	The 20/20 Experience	
2013 (41st)	Rihanna	Unapologetic	
2013 (41st)	Robin Thicke	Blurred Lines	
2014 (42nd)
2014 (42nd)	Beyoncé	Beyoncé	
2014 (42nd)	John Legend	Love in the Future	
2014 (42nd)	Pharrell Williams	Girl	
2015 (43rd)
2015 (43rd)	The Weeknd	Beauty Behind the Madness	
2015 (43rd)	Chris Brown	X	
2015 (43rd)	D'Angelo	Black Messiah	
2016 (44th)
2016 (44th)	Rihanna	Anti	
2016 (44th)	Beyoncé	Lemonade	
2016 (44th)	Bryson Tiller	Trapsoul	
2017 (45th)
2017 (45th)	Bruno Mars	24K Magic	
2017 (45th)	Childish Gambino	"Awaken, My Love!"	
2017 (45th)	The Weeknd	Starboy	
2018 (46th)
2018 (46th)	XXXTentacion	17	
2018 (46th)	Khalid	American Teen	
2018 (46th)	SZA	Ctrl	
2019 (47th)
2019 (47th)	Khalid	Free Spirit	
2019 (47th)	Chris Brown	Indigo	
2019 (47th)	Ella Mai	Ella Mai	

=== 2020s ===
Year	Artist	Album	Ref
2020 (48th)
2020 (48th)	The Weeknd	After Hours	
2020 (48th)	Doja Cat	Hot Pink	
2020 (48th)	Summer Walker	Over It	
2021 (49th)
2021 (49th)	Doja Cat	Planet Her	
2021 (49th)	Giveon	When It's All Said and Done... Take Time	
2021 (49th)	H.E.R.	Back of My Mind	
2021 (49th)	Jazmine Sullivan	Heaux Tales	
2021 (49th)	Queen Naija	Missunderstood	
2022 (50th)
2022 (50th)	Beyoncé	Renaissance	
2022 (50th)	Drake	Honestly, Nevermind	
2022 (50th)	Silk Sonic (Bruno Mars & Anderson .Paak)	An Evening with Silk Sonic	
2022 (50th)	Summer Walker	Still Over It	
2022 (50th)	The Weeknd	Dawn FM	
2023 – 24	—N/a		
2025 (51st)
2025 (51st)	The Weeknd	Hurry Up Tomorrow	
2025 (51st)	PartyNextDoor	PartyNextDoor 4	
2025 (51st)	PartyNextDoor & Drake	Some Sexy Songs 4 U	
2025 (51st)	SZA	SOS Deluxe: Lana	
2025 (51st)	Bryson Tiller	Bryson Tiller	
2026 (52nd)
2026 (52nd)	Bruno Mars	The Romantic	
2026 (52nd)	Justin Bieber	Swag	
2026 (52nd)	Leon Thomas	Mutt	
2026 (52nd)	Mariah the Scientist	Hearts Sold Separately	
2026 (52nd)	Summer Walker	Finally Over It	

== Category facts ==
=== Multiple wins ===
4 wins

- Michael Jackson

3 wins

- Toni Braxton
- Rihanna
- The Weeknd

2 wins

- Beyoncé
- Mary J. Blige
- Whitney Houston
- Justin Timberlake
- Usher
- Luther Vandross
- Stevie Wonder
- Bruno Mars

=== Multiple nominations ===
7 nominations

- Beyoncé

6 nominations

- Mariah Carey
- Michael Jackson

5 nominations

- Whitney Houston
- The Weeknd
- Stevie Wonder

4 nominations

- Mary J. Blige
- Chris Brown
- Earth, Wind & Fire
- Janet Jackson
- Alicia Keys
- Rihanna
- Luther Vandross

3 nominations

- Toni Braxton
- Gladys Knight & the Pips
- Bruno Mars
- Teddy Pendergrass
- Prince
- R. Kelly
- Usher
- Summer Walker

2 nominations

- Ashanti
- Anita Baker
- Boyz II Men
- Commodores
- Destiny's Child
- Doja Cat
- Drake
- Khalid
- Marvin Gaye
- Rick James
- Quincy Jones
- MC Hammer
- PartyNextDoor
- Lionel Richie
- Keith Sweat
- SZA
- Justin Timberlake
- TLC
