= American Music Awards of 2019 =

American Music Awards

47th Annual American Music Awards
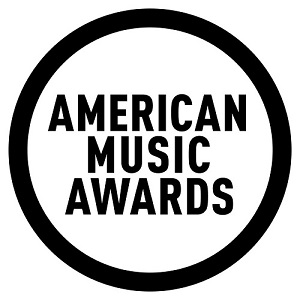
- American Music Awards of 2019 logo
- Sponsored by: Frozen II; T-Mobile; Dolby; Wells Fargo; Facebook; Knives Out; Star Wars: The Rise of Skywalker; Xfinity
- Date: November 24, 2019
- Location: Microsoft Theater, Los Angeles, California
- Country: United States
- Hosted by: Ciara

Highlights
- Most wins: Taylor Swift (6)
- Most nominations: Post Malone (7)
- Website: theamas.com

Television/radio coverage
- Network: ABC
- Runtime: 188 minutes
- Viewership: 6.69 million
- Produced by: Dick Clark Productions

The 47th Annual American Music Awards were held on November 24, 2019 at the Microsoft Theater in Los Angeles, recognizing the most popular artists and albums of 2019. It was broadcast live on ABC, and hosted by Ciara. Taylor Swift received the Artist of the Decade award, and was also the most awarded artist of the night with six wins, becoming the most awarded artist in the award's history with 29 wins and extending her record in the categories of Artist of the Year, Favorite Pop/Rock Female Artist and Favorite Pop/Rock Album. Post Malone received the most nominations of any artist with seven nominations, followed by Ariana Grande and first-time nominee Billie Eilish with six nominations each.

== Performances ==
Artist(s)	Song(s)
Selena Gomez	"Lose You to Love Me" "Look at Her Now"
Ciara	"Melanin" (with Ester Dean and La La Anthony)
Lizzo	"Jerome"
Thomas Rhett	"Look What God Gave Her"
Shawn Mendes; Camila Cabello	"Señorita"
Kesha	"Raising Hell" (with Big Freedia) "Tik Tok"
Toni Braxton	"Un-Break My Heart"
Billie Eilish	"All the Good Girls Go to Hell"
Halsey	"Graveyard"
Green Day	"Father of All..." "Basket Case"
Camila Cabello	"Living Proof"
Jonas Brothers	"Only Human" (from TD Garden in Boston)
Taylor Swift	Artist of the Decade Medley: "The Man" "Love Story" "I Knew You Were Trouble" "Blank Space" "Shake It Off" (with Halsey and Camila Cabello) "Lover (First Dance Remix)" (with Misty Copeland and Craig Hall)
Christina Aguilera; A Great Big World	"Fall on Me"
Post Malone	"Circles" "Take What You Want" (with Ozzy Osbourne, Travis Scott and Watt)
Dua Lipa	"Don't Start Now"
Shania Twain	Medley: "You're Still the One" "Any Man of Mine" "That Don't Impress Me Much" "Man! I Feel Like a Woman!"

== Presenters ==
- Carole King — introduced and presented Artist of the Decade to Taylor Swift.
- Paula Abdul — introduced Toni Braxton.
- Carrie Underwood — introduced Christina Aguilera and A Great Big World.
- Tyra Banks – introduced Lizzo.
- Chadwick Boseman – presented Favorite Alternative Rock Artist.
- Kane Brown — introduced Thomas Rhett.
- Misty Copeland and Ben Platt — presented Favorite Country Song.
- Rivers Cuomo and Pete Wentz — introduced Post Malone, Ozzy Osbourne, Watt, and Travis Scott.
- Heidi Klum and Dan Levy — presented Favorite Pop/Rock Album.
- David Dobrik and Maddie Hasson — introduced Kesha and Big Freedia.
- Cobie Smulders and Michael Ealy — presented Favorite Country Album and Favorite Female Country Artist.
- Jamie Lee Curtis and Katherine Langford — presented Collaboration of the Year.
- Dan + Shay and Maya Hawke – presented Favorite Rap/Hip-Hop Album.
- Patrick Schwarzenegger and Jenna Dewan – introduced Halsey.
- Taran Killam and Jameela Jamil – presented New Artist of the Year.
- Jharrel Jerome and Megan Thee Stallion – presented Favorite Rap/Hip-Hop Song.
- Regina King – presented Artist of the Year.
- Billy Porter – introduced Camila Cabello.
- Constance Wu — presented Favorite Pop/Rock Song.
- Tyler, the Creator – introduced Billie Eilish.
- Billie Eilish – introduced Green Day.
- Kelsea Ballerini – introduced Shania.

== Winners and nominees ==
Artist of the Year	New Artist of the Year
Taylor Swift; Drake; Ariana Grande; Halsey; Post Malone	Billie Eilish; Luke Combs; Lil Nas X; Lizzo; Ella Mai
Collaboration of the Year	Tour of the Year
"Señorita" - Shawn Mendes and Camila Cabello; "Shallow" - Lady Gaga and Bradley Cooper; "Old Town Road" - Lil Nas X featuring Billy Ray Cyrus; "Happier" - Marshmello and Bastille; "Sunflower" - Post Malone and Swae Lee	BTS; Ariana Grande; Elton John; Pink; Ed Sheeran
Favorite Music Video	Favorite Social Artist
"You Need to Calm Down" - Taylor Swift; "Bad Guy" - Billie Eilish; "7 Rings" - Ariana Grande; "Without Me" - Halsey; "Old Town Road" - Lil Nas X featuring Billy Ray Cyrus	BTS; Billie Eilish; EXO; Ariana Grande; Shawn Mendes
Favorite Soundtrack	Favorite Male Artist – Pop/Rock
Bohemian Rhapsody - Queen; A Star Is Born - Lady Gaga and Bradley Cooper; Spider-Man: Into the Spider-Verse - Various Artists	Khalid; Post Malone; Drake
Favorite Female Artist – Pop/Rock	Favorite Duo or Group – Pop/Rock
Taylor Swift; Billie Eilish; Ariana Grande	BTS; Jonas Brothers; Panic! at the Disco
Favorite Album – Pop/Rock	Favorite Song – Pop/Rock
Lover - Taylor Swift; When We All Fall Asleep, Where Do We Go? - Billie Eilish; Thank U, Next - Ariana Grande	"Without Me" - Halsey; "Sucker" - Jonas Brothers; "Old Town Road" - Lil Nas X featuring Billy Ray Cyrus; "High Hopes" - Panic! at the Disco; "Sunflower" - Post Malone and Swae Lee
Favorite Male Artist – Country	Favorite Female Artist – Country
Kane Brown; Luke Combs; Thomas Rhett	Carrie Underwood; Kelsea Ballerini; Maren Morris
Favorite Duo or Group – Country	Favorite Album – Country
Dan + Shay; Florida Georgia Line; Old Dominion	Cry Pretty - Carrie Underwood; Experiment - Kane Brown; Dan + Shay - Dan + Shay
Favorite Song – Country	Favorite Artist – Rap/Hip-Hop
"Speechless" - Dan + Shay; "Beautiful Crazy" - Luke Combs; "God's Country" - Blake Shelton	Cardi B; Drake; Post Malone
Favorite Album – Rap/Hip-Hop	Favorite Song – Rap/Hip-Hop
Hollywood's Bleeding - Post Malone; Championship - Meek Mill; Astroworld - Travis Scott	"Old Town Road" - Lil Nas X featuring Billy Ray Cyrus; "Sicko Mode" - Travis Scott; "Wow" - Post Malone
Favorite Male Artist – Soul/R&B	Favorite Female Artist – Soul/R&B
Bruno Mars; Khalid; Chris Brown	Beyoncé; Ella Mai; Lizzo
Favorite Album – Soul/R&B	Favorite Song – Soul/R&B
Free Spirit - Khalid; Indigo - Chris Brown; Ella Mai - Ella Mai	"Talk" - Khalid; "Juice" - Lizzo; "Trip" - Ella Mai
Favorite Artist – Alternative Rock	Favorite Artist – Adult Contemporary
Billie Eilish; Panic! at the Disco; Imagine Dragons	Taylor Swift; Maroon 5; P!nk
Favorite Artist – Latin	Favorite Artist – Contemporary Inspirational
J Balvin; Bad Bunny; Ozuna	Lauren Daigle; MercyMe; For King & Country
Favorite Artist – Electronic Dance Music	Artist of the Decade
Marshmello; Avicii; The Chainsmokers	Taylor Swift

== Gallery ==
Award ceremony gallery
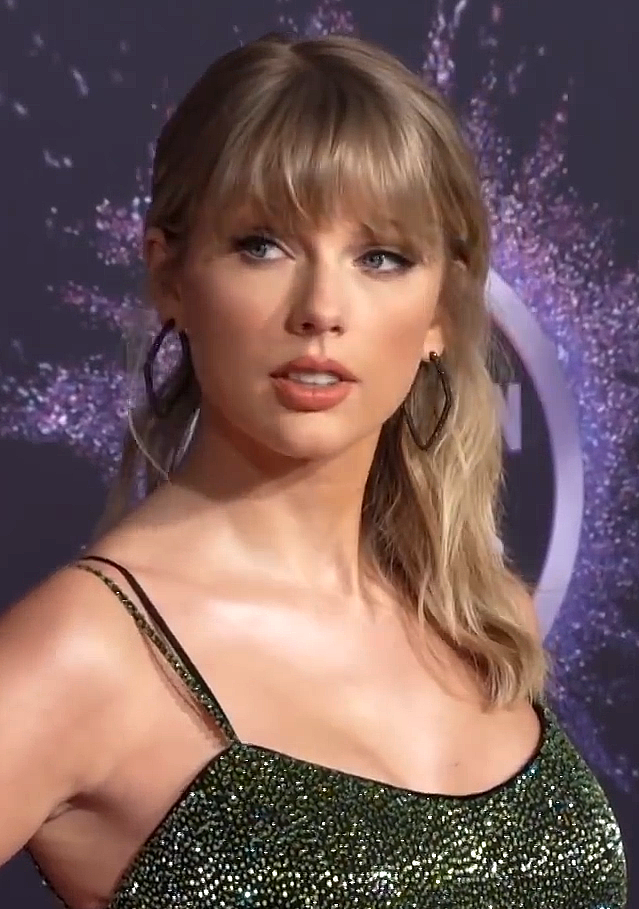
Taylor Swift

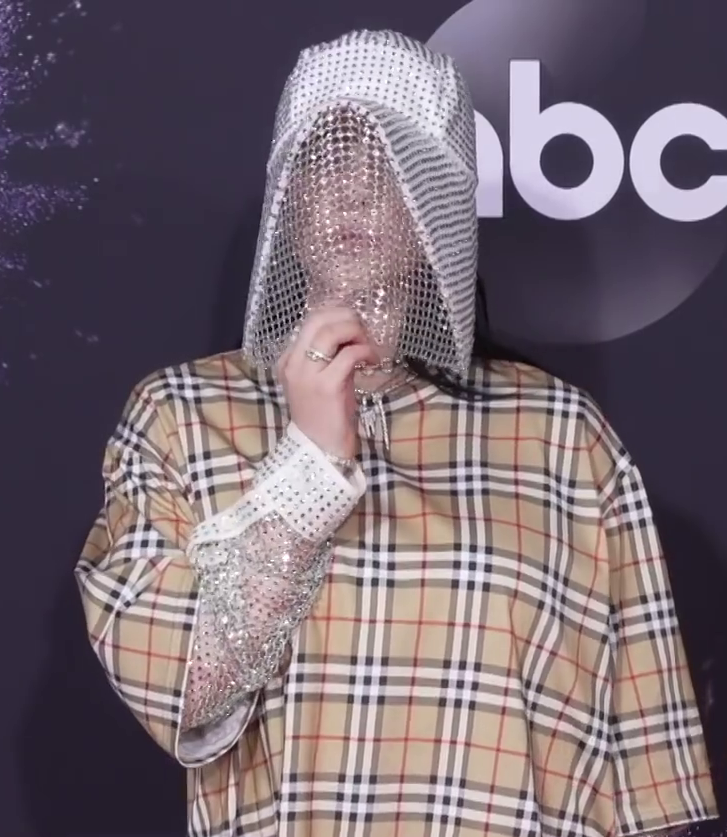
Billie Eilish

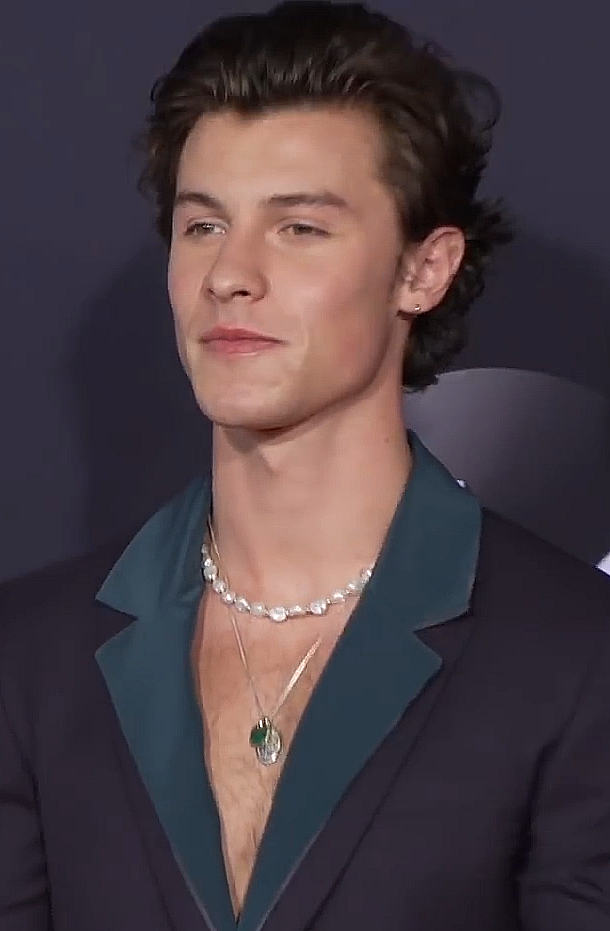
Shawn Mendes

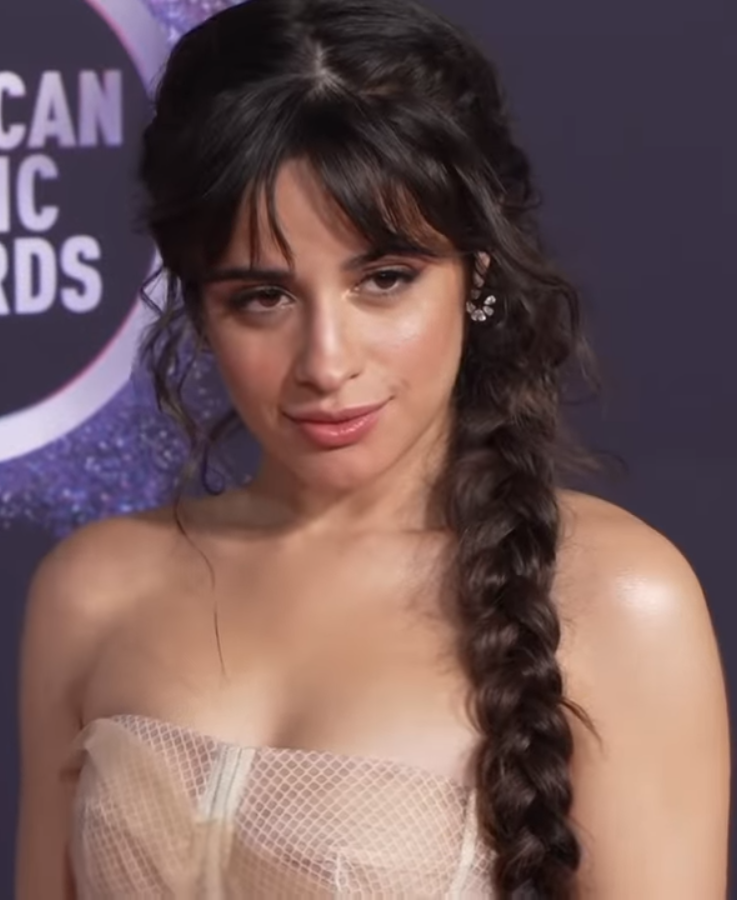
Camila Cabello

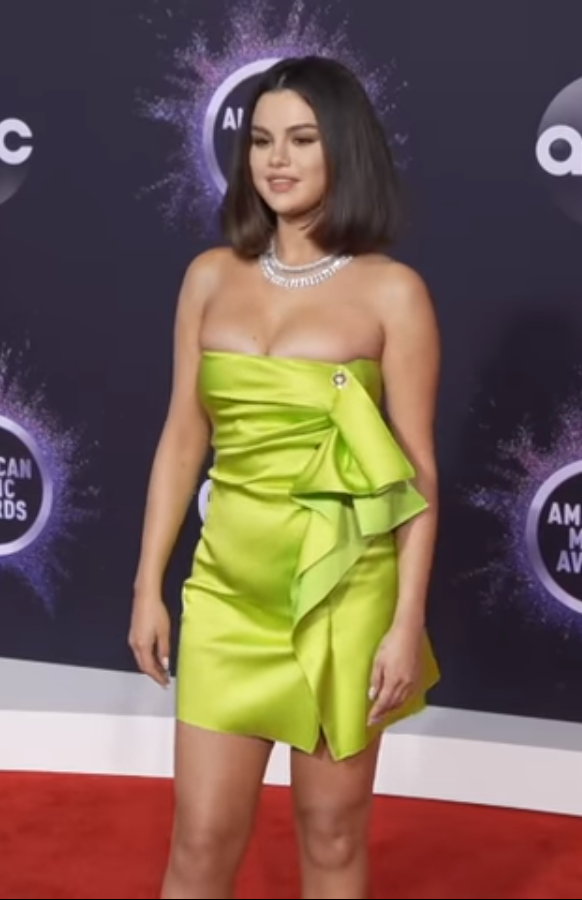
Selena Gomez

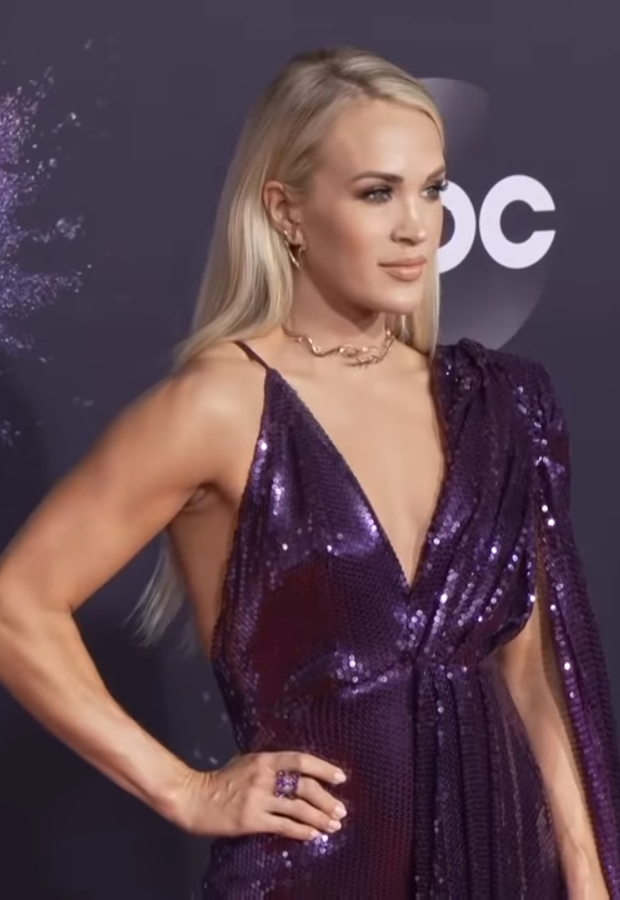
Carrie Underwood

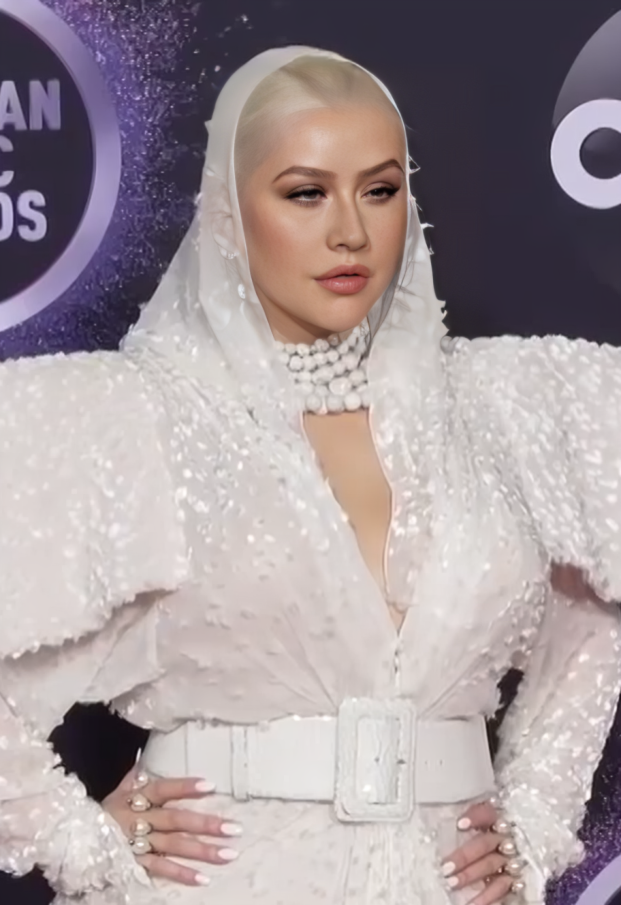
Christina Aguilera

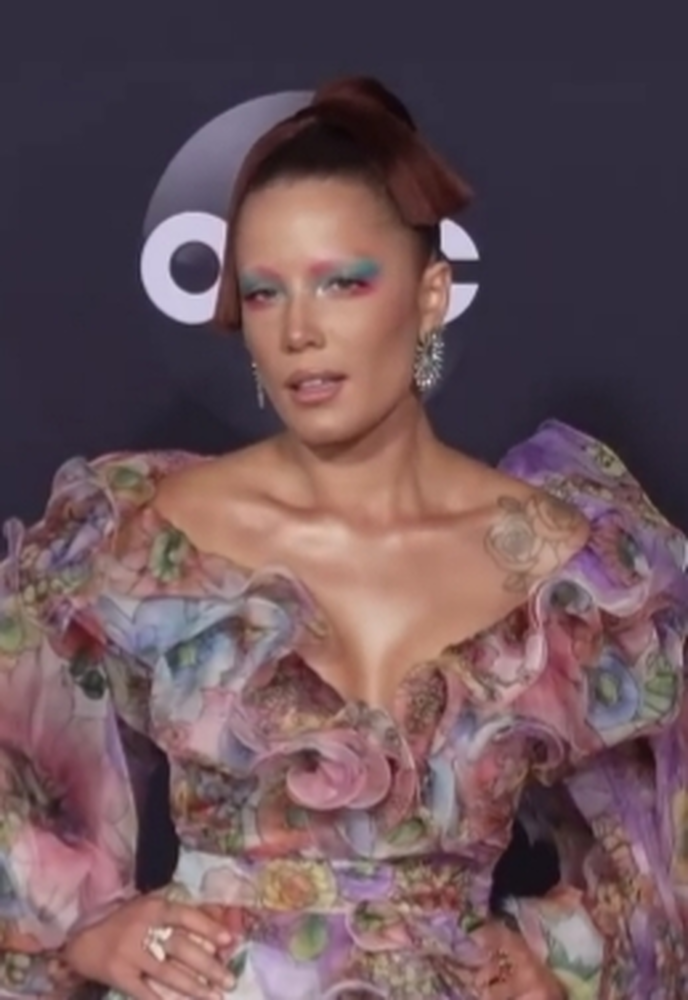
Halsey

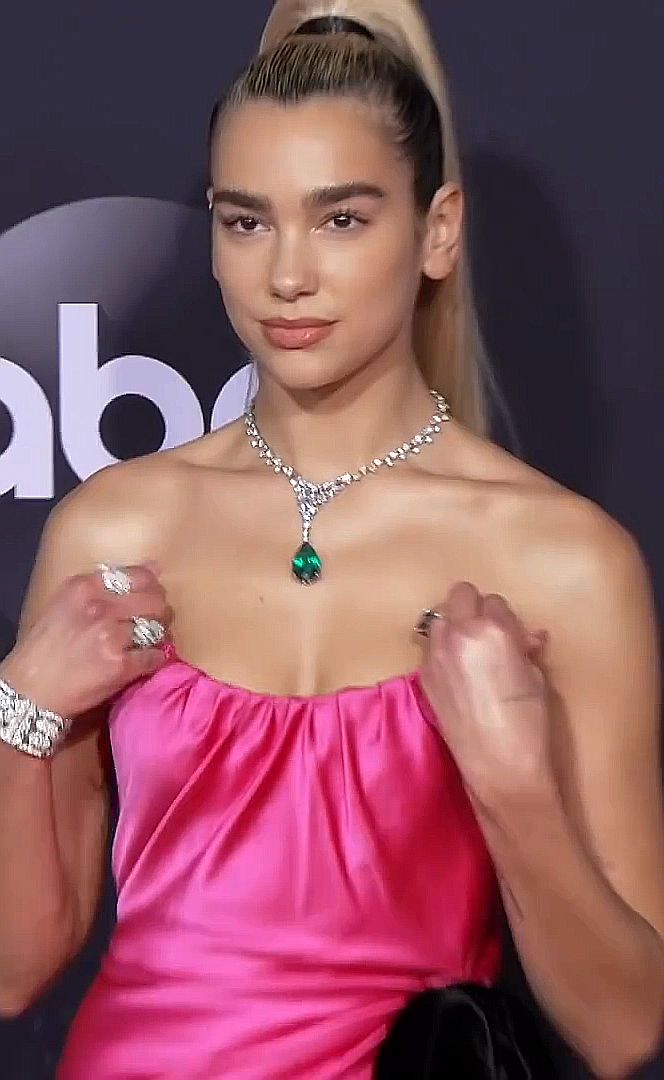
Dua Lipa

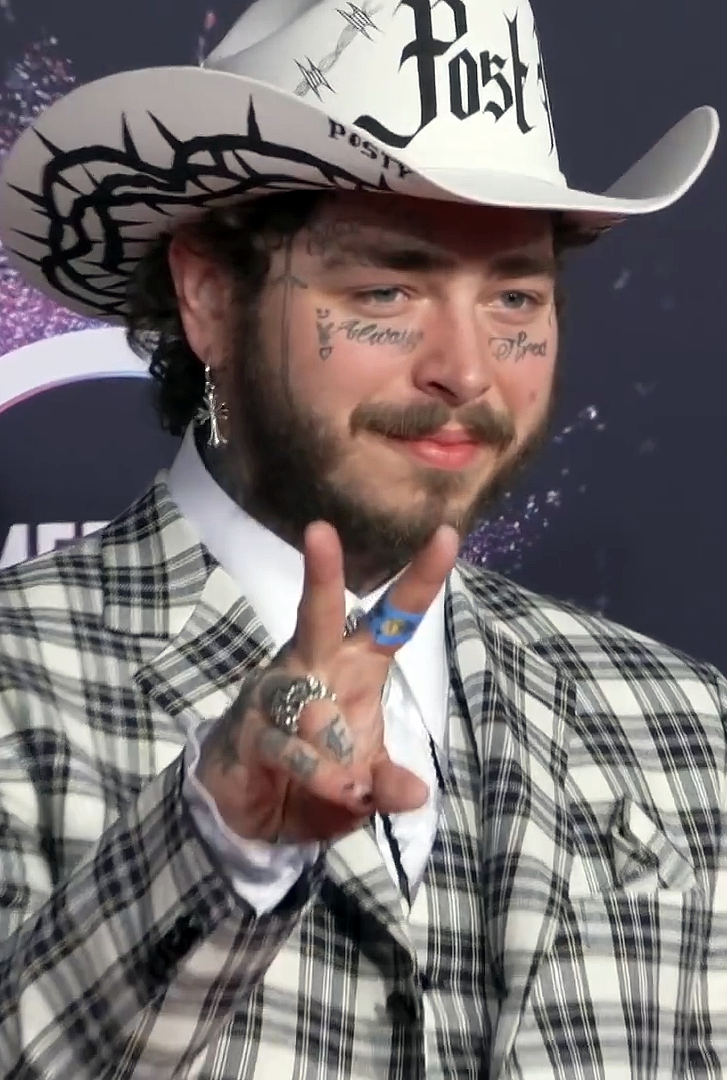
Post Malone

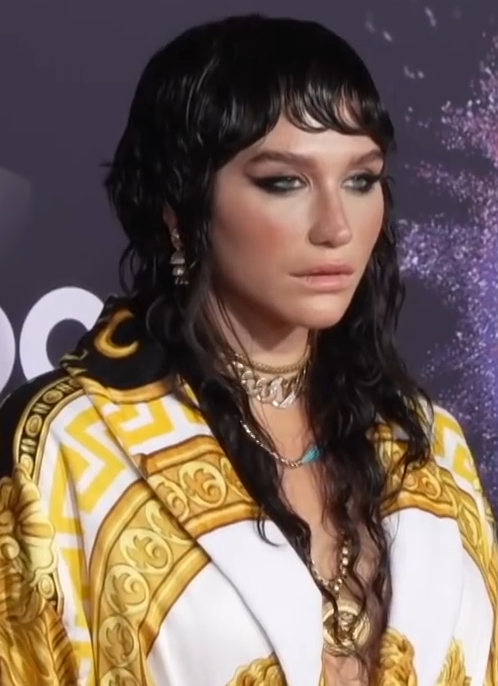
Kesha

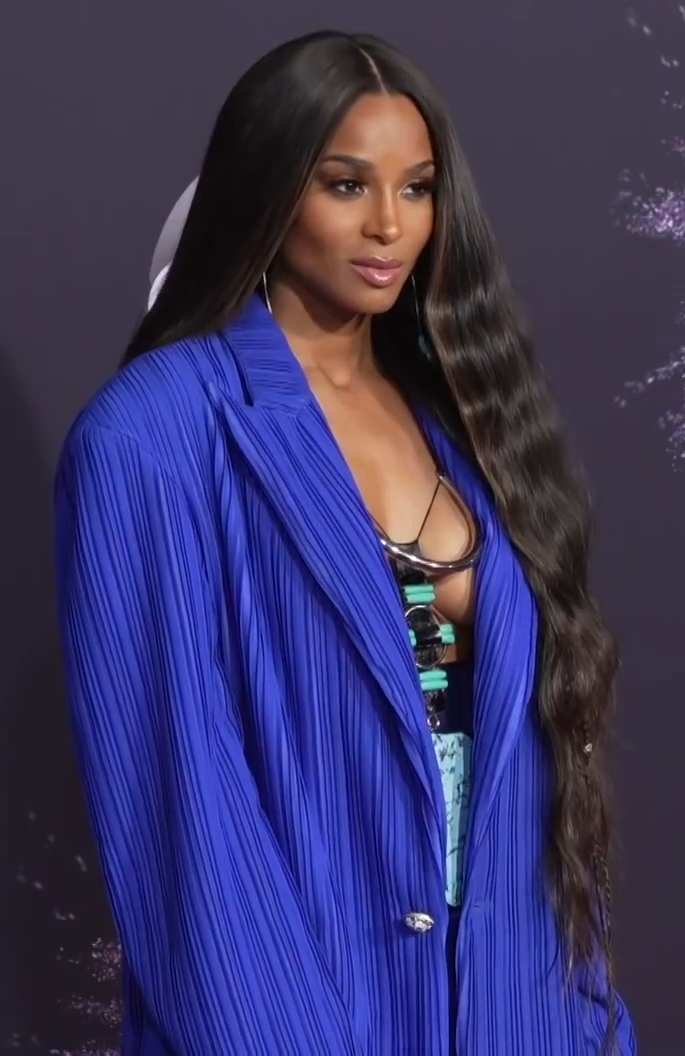
Ciara

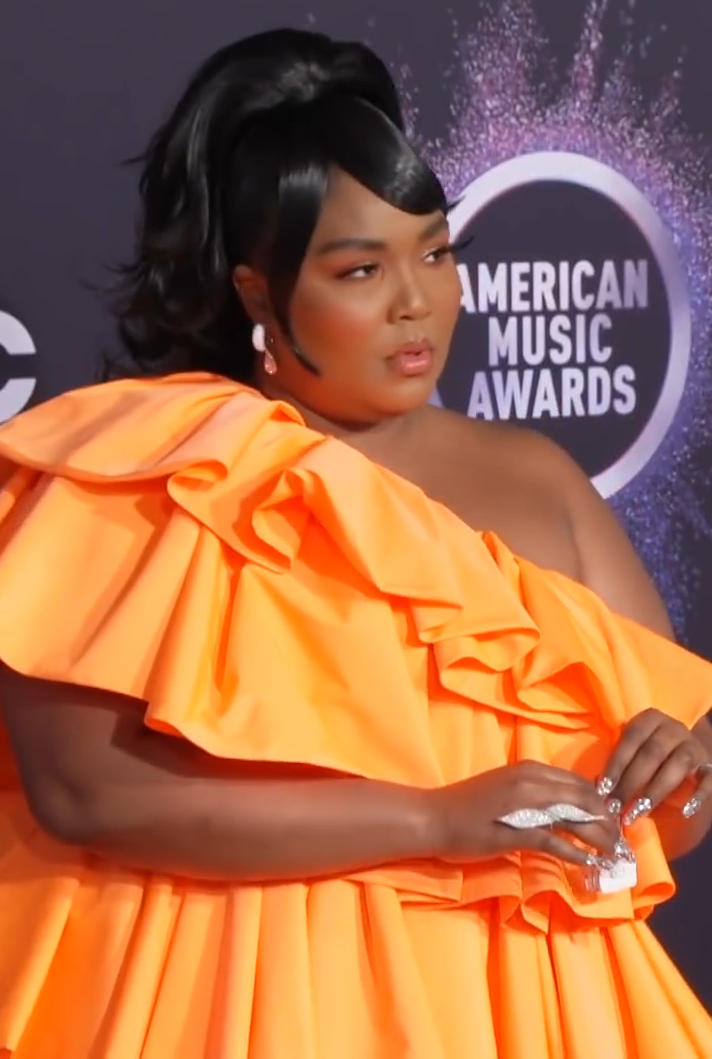
Lizzo

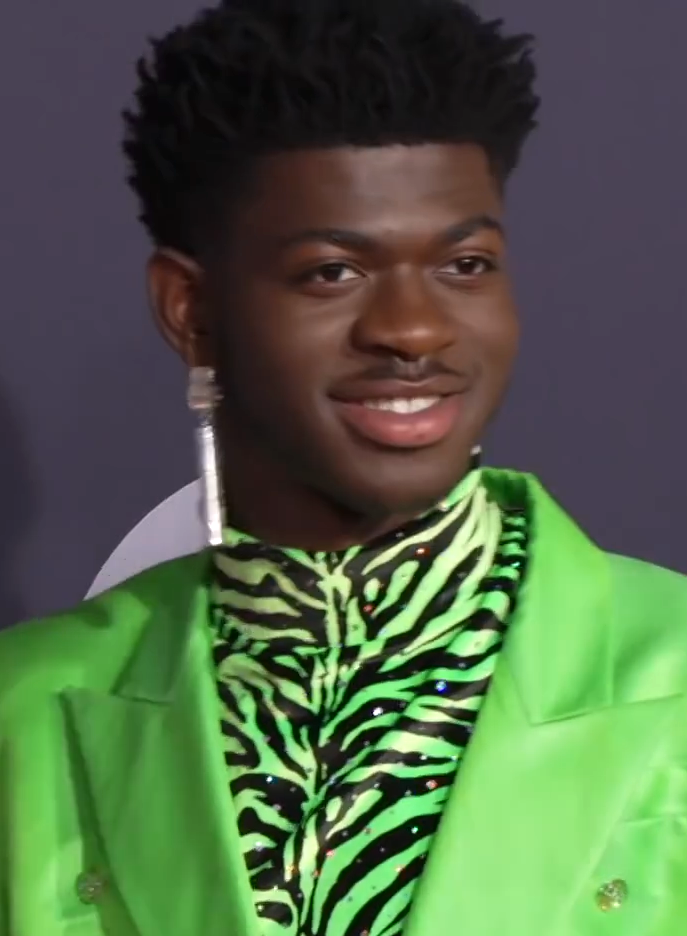
Lil Nas X

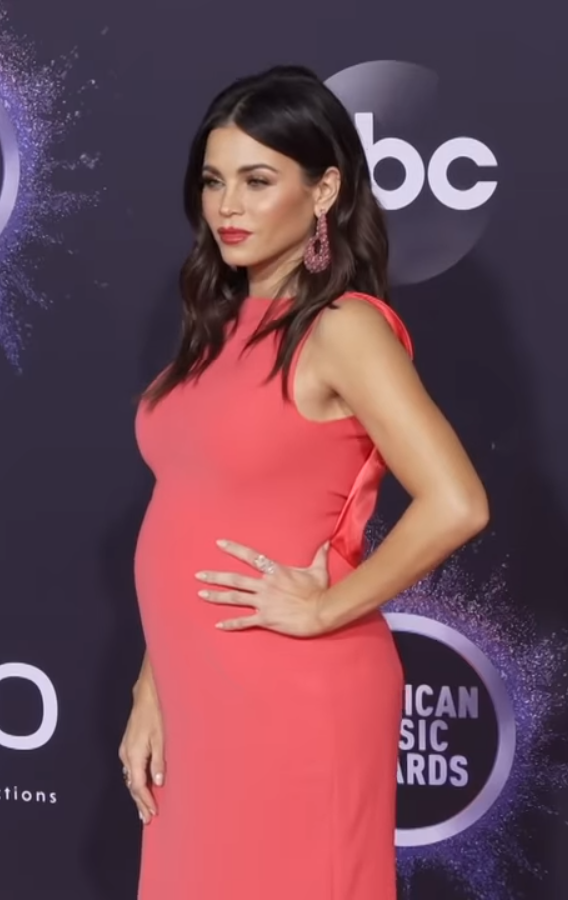
Jenna Dewan
