= American Music Award for Best Pop Song =

Music award category

American Music Awards for Best Pop Song
- Country: United States
- Presented by: American Music Awards
- First award: 1974
- Currently held by: Huntrix – "Golden"

Highlights
- Most wins: Boyz II Men; Justin Bieber; Lionel Richie; Whitney Houston (2 each)
- Website: theamas.com

The American Music Award for Best Pop Song (formerly known as Favorite Pop/Rock Single 1974–1995 and Favorite Song – Pop/Rock 1996–2025) has been awarded since 1974. The category was retired for over a decade in 1995, before returning in the 2016 ceremony. Years reflect the year in which the awards were presented, for works released in the previous year (until 2003 onward when awards were handed out in November of the same year). The all-time winner for this category is tied between the following four artists: Justin Bieber, Boyz II Men, Whitney Houston and Lionel Richie, with 2 wins each.

== Winners and nominees ==
=== 1970s ===
Year	Artist	Song	Ref
1974 (1st)
1974 (1st)	Tony Orlando & Dawn	"Tie a Yellow Ribbon"	
1974 (1st)	Jim Croce	"Bad, Bad Leroy Brown"	
1974 (1st)	Roberta Flack	"Killing Me Softly"	
1975 (2nd)
1975 (2nd)	Olivia Newton-John	"I Honestly Love You"	
1975 (2nd)	Terry Jacks	"Seasons in the Sun"	
1975 (2nd)	Barbra Streisand	"The Way We Were"	
1976 (3rd)
1976 (3rd)	Glen Campbell	"Rhinestone Cowboy"	
1976 (3rd)	Captain & Tennille	"Love Will Keep Us Together"	
1976 (3rd)	Elton John	"Philadelphia Freedom"	
1977 (4th)
1977 (4th)	Elton John and Kiki Dee	"Don't Go Breaking My Heart"	
1977 (4th)	The Manhattans	"Kiss and Say Goodbye"	
1977 (4th)	Wild Cherry	"Play That Funky Music"	
1978 (5th)
1978 (5th)	Debby Boone	"You Light Up My Life"	
1978 (5th)	Andy Gibb	"I Just Want to Be Your Everything"	
1978 (5th)	Meco	"Star Wars Medley"	
1979 (6th)
1979 (6th)	Commodores	"Three Times a Lady"	
1979 (6th)	Bee Gees	"Stayin' Alive"	
1979 (6th)	Debby Boone	"You Light Up My Life (song)"	

=== 1980s ===
Year	Artist	Song	Ref
1980 (7th)
1980 (7th)	Donna Summer	"Bad Girls"	
1980 (7th)	The Knack	"My Sharona"	
1980 (7th)	Rod Stewart	"Da Ya Think I'm Sexy?"	
1981 (8th)
1981 (8th)	Queen	"Another One Bites the Dust"	
1981 (8th)	Pink Floyd	"Another Brick in the Wall"	
1981 (8th)	Diana Ross	"Upside Down"	
1982 (9th)
1982 (9th)	Lionel Richie and Diana Ross	"Endless Love"	
1982 (9th)	Kim Carnes	"Bette Davis Eyes"	
1982 (9th)	REO Speedwagon	"Keep On Loving You"	
1982 (9th)	Rick Springfield	"Jessie's Girl"	
1983 (10th)
1983 (10th)	Lionel Richie	"Truly"	
1983 (10th)	Paul McCartney and Stevie Wonder	"Ebony and Ivory"	
1983 (10th)	Survivor	"Eye of the Tiger"	
1984 (11th)
1984 (11th)	Michael Jackson	"Billie Jean"	
1984 (11th)	Irene Cara	"Flashdance... What a Feeling"	
1984 (11th)	The Police	"Every Breath You Take"	
1984 (11th)	Bonnie Tyler	"Total Eclipse of the Heart"	
1985 (12th)
1985 (12th)	Bruce Springsteen	"Dancing in the Dark"	
1985 (12th)	Prince	"When Doves Cry"	
1985 (12th)	Tina Turner	"What's Love Got to Do with It"	
1986 (13th)
1986 (13th)	Huey Lewis and the News	"The Power of Love"	
1986 (13th)	Dire Straits	"Money for Nothing"	
1986 (13th)	Wham!	"Careless Whisper"	
1987 (14th)
1987 (14th)	Billy Ocean	"There'll Be Sad Songs (To Make You Cry)"	
1987 (14th)	Madonna	"Live to Tell"	
1987 (14th)	Pet Shop Boys	"West End Girls"	
1987 (14th)	Steve Winwood	"Higher Love"	
1988 (15th)
1988 (15th)	Whitney Houston	"I Wanna Dance with Somebody (Who Loves Me)"	
1988 (15th)	Bon Jovi	"Livin' on a Prayer"	
1988 (15th)	Bob Seger	"Shakedown"	
1989 (16th)
1989 (16th)	Guns N' Roses	"Sweet Child O' Mine"	
1989 (16th)	Rick Astley	"Never Gonna Give You Up"	
1989 (16th)	Steve Winwood	"Roll With It"	

=== 1990s ===
Year	Artist	Song	Ref
1990 (17th)
1990 (17th)	Milli Vanilli	"Girl You Know It's True"	
1990 (17th)	Bon Jovi	"I'll Be There for You"	
1990 (17th)	Gloria Estefan	"Don't Wanna Lose You"	
1991 (18th)
1991 (18th)	Jon Bon Jovi	"Blaze of Glory"	
1991 (18th)	Madonna	"Vogue"	
1991 (18th)	Wilson Phillips	"Hold On"	
1992 (19th)
1992 (19th)	Bryan Adams	"(Everything I Do) I Do It for You"	
1992 (19th)	Color Me Badd	"I Wanna Sex You Up"	
1992 (19th)	Extreme	"More Than Words"	
1993 (20th)
1993 (20th)	Boyz II Men	"End of the Road"	
1993 (20th)	Mariah Carey	"I'll Be There"	
1993 (20th)	Red Hot Chili Peppers	"Under the Bridge"	
1994 (21st)
1994 (21st)	Whitney Houston	"I Will Always Love You"	
1994 (21st)	Tag Team	"Whoomp! (There It Is)"	
1994 (21st)	UB40	"Can't Help Falling in Love"	
1995 (22nd)
1995 (22nd)	Boyz II Men	"I'll Make Love to You"	
1995 (22nd)	Ace of Base	"The Sign"	
1995 (22nd)	Celine Dion	"The Power of Love"	

=== 2010s ===
Year	Artist	Song	Ref
2016 (44th)
2016 (44th)	Justin Bieber	"Love Yourself"	
2016 (44th)	Adele	"Hello"	
2016 (44th)	Drake (featuring Wizkid and Kyla)	"One Dance"	
2017 (45th)
2017 (45th)	Luis Fonsi and Daddy Yankee (featuring Justin Bieber)	"Despacito"	
2017 (45th)	The Chainsmokers (featuring Halsey)	"Closer"	
2017 (45th)	Ed Sheeran	"Shape of You"	
2018 (46th)
2018 (46th)	Camila Cabello (featuring Young Thug)	"Havana"	
2018 (46th)	Drake	"God's Plan"	
2018 (46th)	Ed Sheeran	"Perfect"	
2019 (47th)
2019 (47th)	Halsey	"Without Me"	
2019 (47th)	Jonas Brothers	"Sucker"	
2019 (47th)	Lil Nas X (featuring Billy Ray Cyrus)	"Old Town Road"	
2019 (47th)	Panic! at the Disco	"High Hopes"	
2019 (47th)	Post Malone and Swae Lee	"Sunflower"	

=== 2020s ===
Year	Artist	Song	Ref
2020
2020	Dua Lipa	"Don't Start Now"	
2020	Lewis Capaldi	"Someone You Loved"	
2020	Post Malone	"Circles"	
2020	Roddy Ricch	"The Box"	
2020	The Weeknd	"Blinding Lights"	
2021
2021	BTS	"Butter"	
2021	Doja Cat (featuring SZA)	"Kiss Me More"	
2021	Dua Lipa	"Levitating"	
2021	Olivia Rodrigo	"Drivers License"	
2021	The Weeknd and Ariana Grande	"Save Your Tears (Remix)"	
2022
2022	Harry Styles	"As It Was"	
2022	Adele	"Easy on Me"	
2022	Carolina Gaitán, Mauro Castillo, Adassa, Rhenzy Feliz, Diane Guerrero, Stephanie Beatriz and the Encanto Cast	"We Don't Talk About Bruno"	
2022	The Kid Laroi and Justin Bieber	"Stay"	
2022	Lizzo	"About Damn Time"	
2023 – 24	—N/a		
2025
2025	Billie Eilish	"Birds of a Feather"	
2025	Sabrina Carpenter	"Espresso"	
2025	Benson Boone	"Beautiful Things"	
2025	Lady Gaga and Bruno Mars	"Die with a Smile"	
2025	Teddy Swims	"Lose Control"	
2026
2026	Huntrix: Ejae, Audrey Nuna and Rei Ami	"Golden"	
2026	Alex Warren	"Ordinary"	
2026	Olivia Dean	"Man I Need"	
2026	Sabrina Carpenter	"Manchild"	
2026	Taylor Swift	"The Fate of Ophelia"	

== Category facts ==
=== Multiple wins ===
2 wins

- Justin Bieber
- Boyz II Men
- Whitney Houston
- Lionel Richie

=== Multiple nominations ===
3 nominations

- Justin Bieber

2 nominations

- Adele
- Bon Jovi
- Debby Boone
- Boyz II Men
- Sabrina Carpenter
- Whitney Houston
- Elton John
- Dua Lipa
- Madonna
- Lionel Richie
- Diana Ross
- Steve Winwood
- Ed Sheeran
- Halsey
- The Weeknd
