= American Music Award for Favorite Touring Artist =

Annual music award

American Music Awards for Tour of the Year
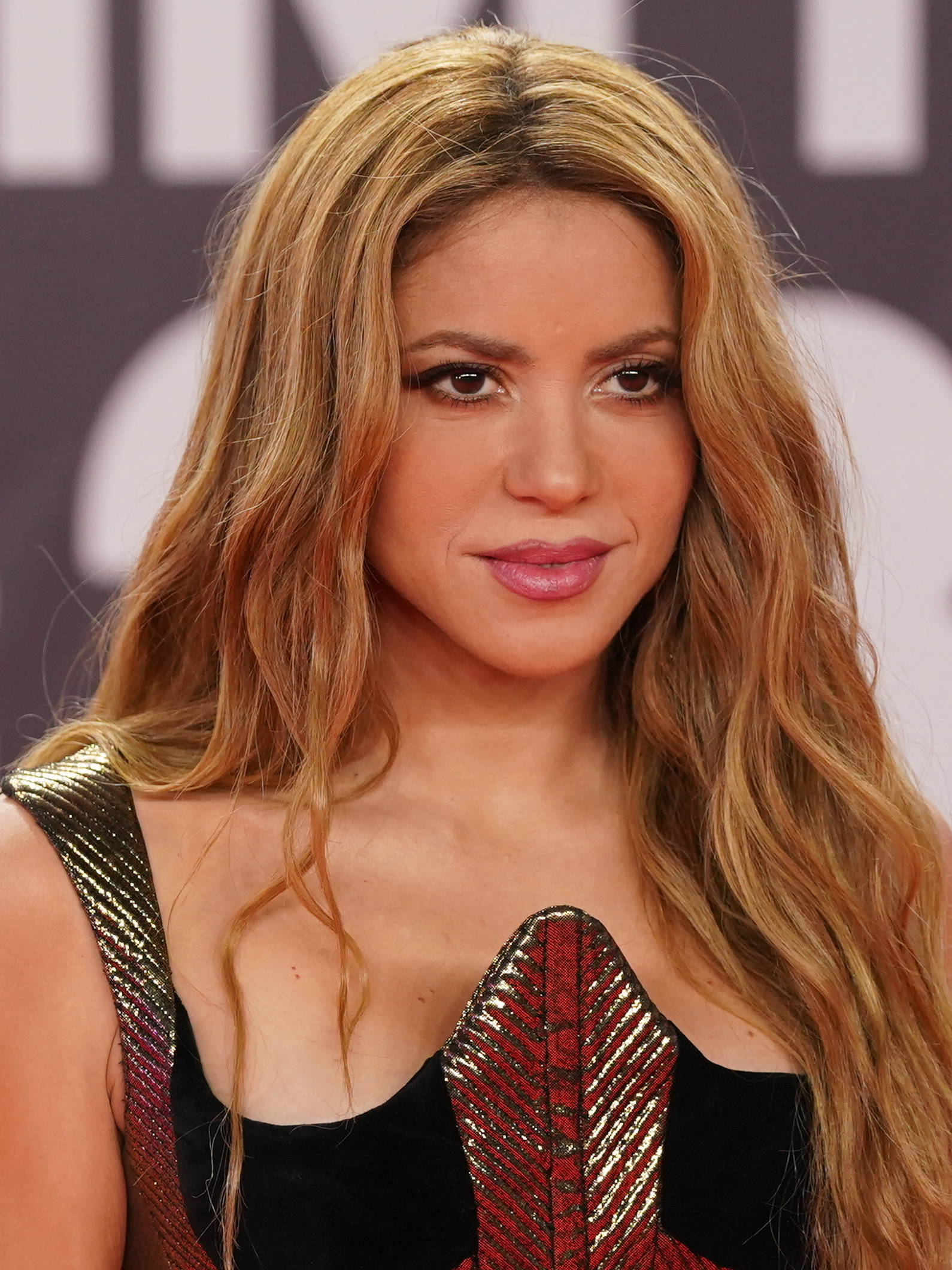
- Shakira is the most recent recipient
- Country: United States
- Presented by: American Music Awards
- First award: 2016
- Currently held by: Shakira – Las Mujeres Ya No Lloran World Tour

Highlights
- Most wins: Coldplay (2)
- Most nominations: Ed Sheeran (3)
- Website: theamas.com

The American Music Award for Tour of the Year has been awarded since 2016. Years reflect the year in which the awards were presented, for works released in the previous year (until 2003 onward when awards were handed out in November of the same year). In 2022, the award's name became Favorite Touring Artist.

== Winners and nominees ==
=== 2010s ===
Year	Artist	Tour	Ref
2016 (44th)	Beyoncé	The Formation World Tour	
2016 (44th)	Madonna	Rebel Heart Tour	
2016 (44th)	Bruce Springsteen and the E Street Band	The River Tour 2016	
2017 (45th)
2017 (45th)	Coldplay	A Head Full of Dreams Tour	
2017 (45th)	Garth Brooks	The Garth Brooks World Tour with Trisha Yearwood	
2017 (45th)	U2	The Joshua Tree Tour 2017	
2018 (46th)
2018 (46th)	Taylor Swift	Reputation Stadium Tour	
2018 (46th)	Bruno Mars	24K Magic World Tour	
2018 (46th)	Ed Sheeran	÷ Tour	
2018 (46th)	Beyoncé and Jay-Z	On the Run II Tour	
2018 (46th)	U2	Experience + Innocence Tour	
2019 (47th)	BTS	Love Yourself World Tour	
2019 (47th)	Ariana Grande	Sweetener World Tour	
2019 (47th)	Elton John	Farewell Yellow Brick Road	
2019 (47th)	Pink	Beautiful Trauma World Tour	
2019 (47th)	Ed Sheeran	÷ Tour	

=== 2020s ===
Year	Artist	Tour	Ref
2022 (50th)	Coldplay	—	
2022 (50th)	Bad Bunny	—	
2022 (50th)	Elton John	—	
2022 (50th)	The Rolling Stones	—	
2022 (50th)	Ed Sheeran	—	
2023 – 24	—N/a		
2025 (51st)	Billie Eilish	—	
2025 (51st)	Zach Bryan	—	
2025 (51st)	Luke Combs	—	
2025 (51st)	Taylor Swift	—	
2025 (51st)	Morgan Wallen	—	
2026 (52nd)	Shakira	Las Mujeres Ya No Lloran World Tour	
2026 (52nd)	Beyoncé	Cowboy Carter Tour	
2026 (52nd)	Kendrick Lamar and SZA	Grand National Tour	
2026 (52nd)	Lady Gaga	The Mayhem Ball	
2026 (52nd)	Oasis	Oasis Live '25 Tour	

== Category facts ==
=== Multiple wins ===
2 wins

- Coldplay

=== Multiple nominations ===
3 nominations

- Beyoncé
- Ed Sheeran

2 nominations

- Coldplay
- Elton John
- Taylor Swift
- U2
