= American Music Awards of 1979 =

US television program

6th Annual American Music Awards
- Date: January 12, 1979
- Venue: Santa Monica Civic Auditorium, Santa Monica, California
- Country: United States
- Hosted by: Donna Summer; Glen Campbell; Helen Reddy

Highlights
- Most awards: Donna Summer (3)
- Most nominations: Donna Summer (5)

Television/radio coverage
- Network: ABC
- Runtime: 120 min.
- Produced by: Dick Clark Productions

The sixth Annual American Music Awards were held January 12, 1979.

== Winners and nominees ==
| Subcategory | Winner | Nominees |
|---|---|---|
Pop/Rock Category
| Favorite Pop/Rock Male Artist | Barry Manilow | Andy Gibb; Billy Joel |
| Favorite Pop/Rock Female Artist | Linda Ronstadt | Barbra Streisand; Donna Summer |
| Favorite Pop/Rock Band/Duo/Group | Bee Gees | Fleetwood Mac; Foreigner |
| Favorite Pop/Rock Album | Grease Soundtrack | Rumours – Fleetwood Mac; Saturday Night Fever – Soundtrack |
| Favorite Pop/Rock Song | "Three Times a Lady" – Commodores | "Stayin' Alive" – Bee Gees "You Light Up My Life" – Debby Boone |
Soul/R&B Category
| Favorite Soul/R&B Male Artist | Teddy Pendergrass; Lou Rawls | Johnny Mathis |
| Favorite Soul/R&B Female Artist | Natalie Cole | Roberta Flack; Donna Summer |
| Favorite Soul/R&B Band/Duo/Group | Earth Wind and Fire | Commodores; The Emotions |
| Favorite Soul/R&B Album | Saturday Night Fever – Bee Gees | Life Is a Song Worth Singing – Teddy Pendergrass; All 'n' All – Earth, Wind & Fire |
| Favorite Soul/R&B Song | "Too Much, Too Little, Too Late" – Johnny Mathis & Deniece Williams | "Our Love" – Natalie Cole "Use Ta Be My Girl" – The O'Jays |
Country Category
| Favorite Country Male Artist | Kenny Rogers | Merle Haggard; Ronnie Milsap |
| Favorite Country Female Artist | Crystal Gayle | Loretta Lynn; Linda Ronstadt |
| Favorite Country Band/Duo/Group | The Statler Brothers | The Oak Ridge Boys; Waylon Jennings & Willie Nelson |
| Favorite Country Album | Ten Years of Gold – Kenny Rogers | Here You Come Again – Dolly Parton; Simple Dreams – Linda Ronstadt |
| Favorite Country Song | "Blue Bayou" – Linda Ronstadt | "Here You Come Again" – Dolly Parton "Take This Job and Shove It" – Johnny Paycheck |
Disco Category
| Favorite Disco Male Artist | Isaac Hayes | Peter Brown; Teddy Pendergrass |
| Favorite Disco Female Artist | Donna Summer | Pattie Brooks; Linda Clifford |
| Favorite Disco Band/Duo/Group | Village People | Silver Convention; The Trammps |
| Favorite Disco Album | Live and More – Donna Summer | Super Nature – Cerrone; Thank God It's Friday – Soundtrack |
| Favorite Disco Song | "Last Dance" – Donna Summer | "Shame" – Evelyn King "Macho Man" – The Village People |
Merit
Perry Como
