= American Music Awards of 1983 =

US television program

10th Annual American Music Awards
- Date: January 17, 1983
- Venue: Shrine Auditorium, Los Angeles, California
- Country: United States

Television/radio coverage
- Network: ABC
- Runtime: 180 min.
- Produced by: Dick Clark Productions

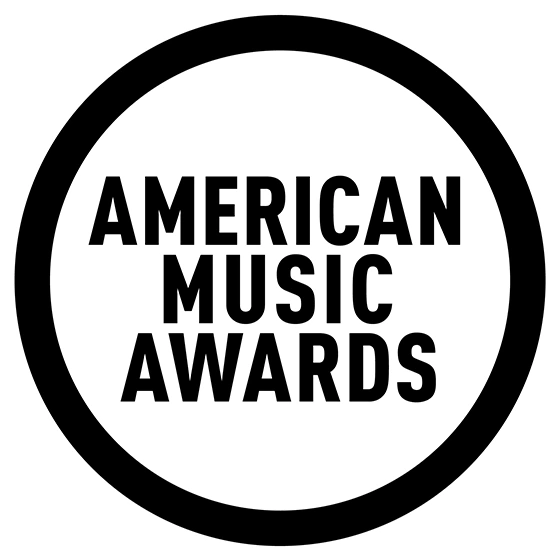
American Music Awards logo since 2019

The 10th Annual American Music Awards were held on January 17, 1983.

== Performances ==
Artist(s)	Song(s)
Melissa Manchester	"You Should Here How She Talks About You"
The Oak Ridge Boys	"American Made"
Daryl Hall & John Oates	"Maneater" (pre-recorded from New York)
Aretha Franklin	Medley: "Jump To It" "Day Dreaming" "Think" "Respect"
Stray Cats	"Rock This Town"
Crystal Gayle; Mac Davis; Dottie West; Lionel Richie; Melissa Manchester; Aretha Franklin	Tribute to Kenny Rogers "Lucille"
Mitch Ryder; John Cougar	"B.I.G. T.I.M.E."
The Gap Band	"You Dropped A Bomb On Me"
Mac Davis	"Naughty Girl"
The Statler Brothers	"Child of the Fifties"

== Winners and nominees ==
Subcategory	Winner	Nominees
Pop/Rock Categories
Favorite Pop/Rock Male Artist	John Cougar; Rick Springfield	Paul McCartney
Favorite Pop/Rock Female Artist	Olivia Newton-John	Stevie Nicks; Diana Ross
Favorite Pop/Rock Band/Duo/Group	Daryl Hall & John Oates	Fleetwood Mac; The J. Geils Band
Favorite Pop/Rock Album	Always On My Mind – Willie Nelson	Mirage – Fleetwood Mac; Escape – Journey
Favorite Pop/Rock Song	"Truly" – Lionel Richie	"Ebony and Ivory" – Paul McCartney & Stevie Wonder "Eye of the Tiger" – Survivor
Soul/R&B Categories
Favorite Soul/R&B Male Artist	Lionel Richie	Rick James; Stevie Wonder
Favorite Soul/R&B Female Artist	Diana Ross	Aretha Franklin; Evelyn King
Favorite Soul/R&B Band/Duo/Group	Kool & The Gang	The Gap Band; The Time
Favorite Soul/R&B Album	Jump to It – Aretha Franklin	Throwin' Down – Rick James; Stevie Wonder's Original Musiquarium I – Stevie Wonder
Favorite Soul/R&B Song	"Sexual Healing" – Marvin Gaye	"Jump to It" – Aretha Franklin "Love Come Down" – Evelyn King
Country Categories
Favorite Country Male Artist	Kenny Rogers	Charley Pride; Conway Twitty
Favorite Country Female Artist	Barbara Mandrell	Emmylou Harris; Sylvia
Favorite Country Band/Duo/Group	Alabama	The Oak Ridge Boys; Statler Brothers
Favorite Country Album	Always on My Mind – Willie Nelson	Mountain Music – Alabama; Fancy Free – The Oak Ridge Boys
Favorite Country Song	"Love Will Turn You Around" – Kenny Rogers	"Bobbie Sue" – The Oak Ridge Boys "Nobody" – Sylvia
Merit
Kenny Rogers
