= American Music Award for Best R&B Song =

Music award for soul/R&B since 1974

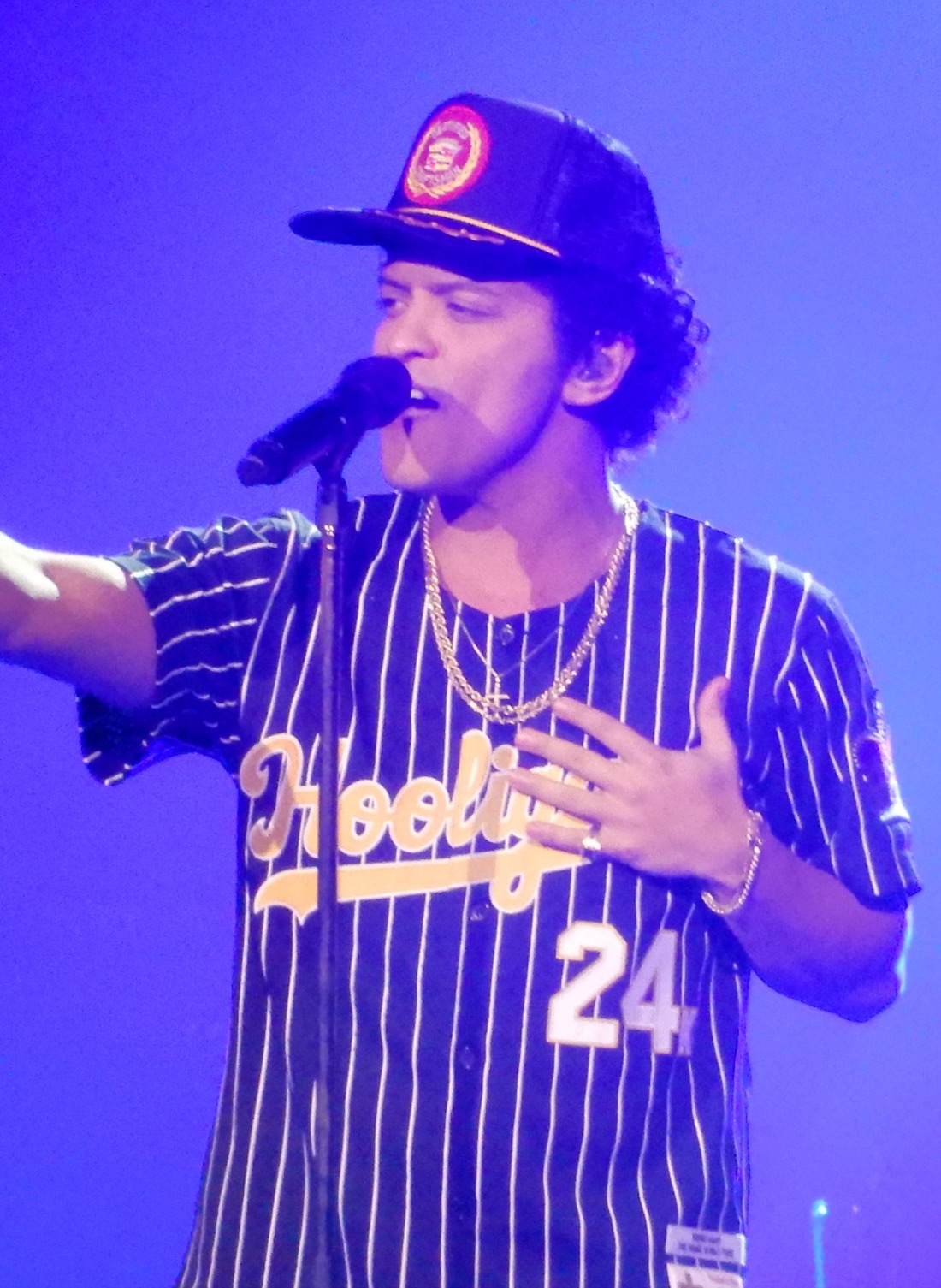
- "I Just Might" by Bruno Mars is the most recent recipient
- Country: United States
- Presented by: American Music Awards
- First award: 1974
- Currently held by: Bruno Mars – "I Just Might"

Highlights
- Most wins: Bruno Mars (4)
- Most nominations: Bruno Mars (5)
- Website: theamas.com

The American Music Award for Best R&B Song (formerly known as Favorite Soul/R&B Single 1974-1995 and Favorite Song – Soul/R&B 1996-2025) has been awarded since 1974. While the start and end dates for the usage of the category Favorite Black Single are unclear, in 1985 the name was used for the award Prince was given for his single When Doves Cry. The category was retired for over a decade in 1995, before returning in the 2016 ceremony. Years reflect the year in which the awards were presented, for works released in the previous year (until 2003 onward when awards were handed out on November of the same year). The all-time winners for this category are Michael Jackson and Bruno Mars, both with 3 wins. The latter is also the most nominated artist. Singers Diana Ross, Janet Jackson and Whitney Houston share the record for most wins by a female artist in the category with two each.

== Winners and nominees ==
=== 1970s ===
Year	Artist	Song	Ref
1974 (1st)
1974 (1st)	Stevie Wonder	"Superstition"	
1974 (1st)	Billy Paul	"Me and Mrs. Jones"	
1974 (1st)	Gladys Knight & the Pips	"Midnight Train to Georgia"	
1975 (2nd)
1975 (2nd)	Gladys Knight & the Pips	"Midnight Train to Georgia"	
1975 (2nd)	Roberta Flack	"Feel Like Makin' Love"	
1975 (2nd)	Gladys Knight & the Pips	"You're the Best Thing That Ever Happened to Me"	
1976 (3rd)
1976 (3rd)	KC and the Sunshine Band	"Get Down Tonight"	
1976 (3rd)	Love Unlimited	"I Belong to You"	
1976 (3rd)	Gwen McCrae	"Rockin' Chair"	
1977 (4th)
1977 (4th)	Lou Rawls	"You'll Never Find Another Love Like Mine"	
1977 (4th)	Wild Cherry	"Play That Funky Music"	
1978 (5th)
1978 (5th)	The Emotions	"Best of My Love"	
1978 (5th)	Commodores	"Brick House"	
1978 (5th)	Barry White	"It's Ecstasy When You Lay Down Next to Me"	
1979 (6th)
1979 (6th)	Johnny Mathis and Deniece Williams	"Too Much, Too Little, Too Late"	
1979 (6th)	Natalie Cole	"Our Love"	
1979 (6th)	The O'Jays	"Use ta Be My Girl"	

=== 1980s ===
Year	Artist	Song	Ref
1980 (7th)
1980 (7th)	Michael Jackson	"Don't Stop 'Til You Get Enough"	
1980 (7th)	Kool & the Gang	"Ladies Night"	
1980 (7th)	Peaches & Herb	"Reunited"	
1981 (8th)
1981 (8th)	Diana Ross	"Upside Down"	
1981 (8th)	George Benson	"Give Me the Night"	
1981 (8th)	Larry Graham	"One in a Million You"	
1982 (9th)
1982 (9th)	Lionel Richie and Diana Ross	"Endless Love"	
1982 (9th)	Carl Carlton	"She's a Bad Mama Jama (She's Built, She's Stacked)"	
1982 (9th)	Rick James	"Give It to Me Baby"	
1982 (9th)	Smokey Robinson	"Being with You"	
1983 (10th)
1983 (10th)	Marvin Gaye	"Sexual Healing"	
1983 (10th)	Aretha Franklin	"Jump to It"	
1983 (10th)	Evelyn "Champagne" King	"Love Come Down"	
1984 (11th)
1984 (11th)	Lionel Richie	"All Night Long (All Night)"	
1984 (11th)	Michael Jackson	"Billie Jean"	
1984 (11th)	Rick James	"Cold Blooded"	
1984 (11th)	Mtume	"Juicy Fruit"	
1985 (12th)
1985 (12th)	Prince	"When Doves Cry"	
1985 (12th)	Billy Ocean	"Caribbean Queen (No More Love on the Run)"	
1985 (12th)	Tina Turner	"What's Love Got to Do with It"	
1986 (13th)
1986 (13th)	Whitney Houston	"You Give Good Love"	
1986 (13th)	Commodores	"Nightshift"	
1986 (13th)	Freddie Jackson	"You Are My Lady"	
1987 (14th)
1987 (14th)	Janet Jackson	"Nasty"	
1987 (14th)	Cameo	"Word Up!"	
1987 (14th)	Prince	"Kiss"	
1987 (14th)	Timex Social Club	"Rumors"	
1988 (15th)
1988 (15th)	Michael Jackson	"Bad"	
1988 (15th)	LeVert	"Casanova"	
1988 (15th)	Jody Watley	"Looking for a New Love"	
1989 (16th)
1989 (16th)	Freddie Jackson	"Nice 'N' Slow"	
1989 (16th)	Al B. Sure!	"Off on Your Own (Girl)"	
1989 (16th)	Pebbles	"Girlfriend"	

=== 1990s ===
Year	Artist	Song	Ref
1990 (17th)
1990 (17th)	Janet Jackson	"Miss You Much"	
1990 (17th)	Anita Baker	"Just Because"	
1990 (17th)	Soul II Soul	"Keep on Movin'"	
1991 (18th)
1991 (18th)	MC Hammer	"U Can't Touch This"	
1991 (18th)	Keith Sweat	"Merry Go Round"	
1991 (18th)	Tony! Toni! Tone!	"Feels Good"	
1992 (19th)
1992 (19th)	Color Me Badd	"I Wanna Sex You Up"	
1992 (19th)	Boyz II Men	"Motownphilly"	
1992 (19th)	Color Me Badd	"I Adore Mi Amor"	
1993 (20th)
1993 (20th)	Michael Jackson	"Remember the Time"	
1993 (20th)	R. Kelly and Public Announcement	"Honey Love"	
1993 (20th)	Patti LaBelle	"Somebody Loves You Baby (You Know Who It Is)"	
1994 (21st)
1994 (21st)	Whitney Houston	"I Will Always Love You"	
1994 (21st)	Mariah Carey	"Dreamlover"	
1994 (21st)	Janet Jackson	"That's the Way Love Goes"	
1995 (22nd)
1995 (22nd)	Boyz II Men	"I'll Make Love to You"	
1995 (22nd)	All-4-One	"I Swear"	
1995 (22nd)	Salt-N-Pepa and En Vogue	"Whatta Man"	

=== 2010s ===
Year	Artist	Song	Ref
2016 (44th)
2016 (44th)	Rihanna (featuring Drake)	"Work"	
2016 (44th)	Drake (featuring Wizkid and Kyla)	"One Dance"	
2016 (44th)	Bryson Tiller	"Don't"	
2017 (45th)
2017 (45th)	Bruno Mars	"That's What I Like"	
2017 (45th)	Khalid	"Location"	
2017 (45th)	The Weeknd (featuring Daft Punk)	"Starboy"	
2018 (46th)
2018 (46th)	Bruno Mars (featuring Cardi B)	"Finesse (Remix)"	
2018 (46th)	Ella Mai	"Boo'd Up"	
2018 (46th)	Khalid	"Young Dumb & Broke"	
2019 (47th)
2019 (47th)	Khalid	"Talk"	
2019 (47th)	Lizzo	"Juice"	
2019 (47th)	Ella Mai	"Trip"	

=== 2020s ===
Year	Artist	Song	Ref
2020 (48th)
2020 (48th)	The Weeknd	"Heartless"	
2020 (48th)	Chris Brown (featuring Drake)	"No Guidance"	
2020 (48th)	Summer Walker	"Playing Games"	
2021 (49th)
2021 (49th)	Silk Sonic (Bruno Mars, Anderson .Paak)	"Leave the Door Open"	
2021 (49th)	Chris Brown and Young Thug	"Go Crazy"	
2021 (49th)	Giveon	"Heartbreak Anniversary"	
2021 (49th)	H.E.R.	"Damage"	
2021 (49th)	Jazmine Sullivan	"Pick Up Your Feelings"	
2022 (50th)
2022 (50th)	Wizkid (featuring Tems)	"Essence"	
2022 (50th)	Muni Long	"Hrs and Hrs"	
2022 (50th)	Silk Sonic (Bruno Mars, Anderson .Paak)	"Smokin out the Window"	
2022 (50th)	SZA	"I Hate U"	
2022 (50th)	Beyoncé	"Break My Soul"	
2023 – 24	—N/a		
2025 (51th)
2025 (51th)	SZA	"Saturn"	
2025 (51th)	Chris Brown	"Residuals"	
2025 (51th)	Muni Long	"Made for Me"	
2025 (51th)	The Weeknd and Playboi Carti	"Timeless"	
2025 (51th)	Tommy Richman	"Million Dollar Baby"	
2026 (52nd)
2026 (52nd)	Bruno Mars	"I Just Might"	
2026 (52nd)	Chris Brown (featuring Bryson Tiller)	"It Depends"	
2026 (52nd)	Kehlani	"Folded"	
2026 (52nd)	Leon Thomas	"Mutt"	
2026 (52nd)	Mariah the Scientist	"Burning Blue"	

== Category facts ==
=== Multiple wins ===
4 wins

- Bruno Mars

3 wins

- Michael Jackson

2 wins

- Whitney Houston
- Janet Jackson
- Lionel Richie
- Diana Ross

=== Multiple nominations ===
5 nominations

- Bruno Mars

4 nominations

- Michael Jackson
- Chris Brown

3 nominations

- Drake
- Janet Jackson
- Khalid
- The Weeknd

2 nominations

- Boyz II Men
- Color Me Badd
- Commodores
- Ella Mai
- Gladys Knight & the Pips
- Whitney Houston
- Freddie Jackson
- Rick James
- Anderson .Paak
- Prince
- Lionel Richie
- Diana Ross
- Muni Long
- SZA
- Bryson Tiller
