= American Music Awards of 2017 =

2017 ceremony of the American Music Awards

45th Annual American Music Awards
- American Music Awards of 2017 logo
- Date: November 19, 2017
- Location: Microsoft Theater; Los Angeles, California
- Country: United States
- Hosted by: Tracee Ellis Ross

Highlights
- Most awards: Bruno Mars (7)
- Most nominations: Bruno Mars (8)
- Website: American Music Awards

Television/radio coverage
- Network: ABC
- Runtime: 180 minutes
- Viewership: 9.15 million
- Produced by: Dick Clark Productions

The 45th Annual American Music Awards took place on November 19, 2017, at the Microsoft Theater in Los Angeles. It was broadcast on ABC and was hosted by Tracee Ellis Ross. Bruno Mars was the most nominated and most awarded artist of the night, taking home 7 awards out of his 8 nominations.

== Performances ==
Artist(s)	Song(s)	Ref.
Kelly Clarkson; P!nk	"Everybody Hurts"	
Demi Lovato	"Sorry Not Sorry"	
Nick Jonas	"Find You"	
Hailee Steinfeld; Alesso; Florida Georgia Line; Watt	"Let Me Go"	
Shawn Mendes	"There's Nothing Holdin' Me Back"	
Selena Gomez; Marshmello	"Wolves"	
Christina Aguilera	Tribute to Whitney Houston & The Bodyguard 25th Anniversary: "I Will Always Love You" "I Have Nothing" "Run to You" "I'm Every Woman"	
Lady Gaga	"The Cure"^{[a]}	
Macklemore; Skylar Grey	"Glorious"	
Portugal. The Man	"Feel It Still"	
Zedd; Alessia Cara	"Stay"	
Imagine Dragons; Khalid	"Young Dumb & Broke" "Thunder"	
P!nk	"Beautiful Trauma"	
Niall Horan	"Slow Hands"	
Kelly Clarkson	"Miss Independent" "Love So Soft"	
BTS	"DNA"	
Diana Ross	"I'm Coming Out" "Take Me Higher" "Ease On down the Road" "The Best Years Of My Life" "Ain't No Mountain High Enough"	

Notes

- ^{^[a]} Broadcast live from Capital One Arena in Washington, D.C.

== Presenters ==
- Chadwick Boseman presented Favorite Duo/Group - Pop Rock
- Chris Hardwick and Lea Michelle introduced Nick Jonas
- Ciara presented Favorite Song - Rap/Hip-Hop
- Lilly Singh and Sabrina Carpenter introduced Shawn Mendes
- Julia Michaels introduced Selena Gomez and Marshmello
- Kathryn Hahn and Justin Hartley presented Favorite Male Artist - Country
- KJ Apa, Camila Mendes, Lili Reinhart, and Madelaine Petsch presented Favorite Artist - EDM
- Viola Davis introduced a tribute to Whitney Houston for the 25th Anniversary of The Bodyguard with a performance by Christina Aguilera
- Billy Eichner and Jenna Dewan Tatum presented Favorite Artist - Adult/Contemporary
- Heidi Klum introduced Lady Gaga
- G-Eazy and DJ Khaled introduced Macklemore and Skylar Grey
- Caleb McLaughlin, Gaten Matarazzo, and Sadie Sink introduced Zedd and Alessia Cara
- Ansel Elgort and Yara Shahidi presented Favorite Female Artist - Pop/Rock
- Nick Cannon presented New Artist of The Year presented by T-Mobile
- Laura Marano and Patrick Schwarzenegger presented Collaboration of The Year presented by XFinity
- Kelly Rowland and Kat Graham introduced Niall Horan
- Daymond John, Kevin O’Leary, and Mark Cuban presented Favorite Artist - Alternative Rock
- Chrissy Metz and Jesse Tyler Ferguson introduced Kelly Clarkson
- The Chainsmokers introduced BTS
- Jared Leto presented Artist of The Year
- Evan Ross introduced Diana Ross, his mother

== Winners and Nominees ==
Artist of the Year	New Artist of the Year
Bruno Mars; The Chainsmokers; Drake; Kendrick Lamar; Ed Sheeran	Niall Horan; James Arthur; Julia Michaels; Post Malone; Rae Sremmurd
Collaboration of the Year	Video of the Year
"Despacito" – Luis Fonsi and Daddy Yankee featuring Justin Bieber; "Closer" – The Chainsmokers featuring Halsey; "I'm the One" – DJ Khaled featuring Justin Bieber, Quavo, Chance the Rapper, and Lil Wayne; "Don't Wanna Know" – Maroon 5 featuring Kendrick Lamar; "Starboy" – The Weeknd featuring Daft Punk	"That's What I Like" – Bruno Mars; "Despacito" – Luis Fonsi and Daddy Yankee featuring Justin Bieber; "Shape of You" – Ed Sheeran
Tour of the Year	Top Soundtrack
A Head Full of Dreams Tour – Coldplay; The Garth Brooks World Tour with Trisha Yearwood – Garth Brooks; The Joshua Tree Tour 2017 – U2	Moana; Guardians of the Galaxy, Vol. 2: Awesome Mix Vol. 2; Trolls
Favorite Male Artist – Pop/Rock	Favorite Female Artist – Pop/Rock
Bruno Mars; Drake; Ed Sheeran	Lady Gaga; Alessia Cara; Rihanna
Favorite Duo or Group – Pop/Rock	Favorite Album – Pop/Rock
Imagine Dragons; The Chainsmokers; Coldplay	24K Magic – Bruno Mars; More Life – Drake; Starboy – The Weeknd
Favorite Song – Pop/Rock	Favorite Male Artist – Country
"Despacito" – Luis Fonsi and Daddy Yankee featuring Justin Bieber; "Closer" – The Chainsmokers featuring Halsey; "Shape of You" – Ed Sheeran	Keith Urban; Sam Hunt; Thomas Rhett
Favorite Female Artist – Country	Favorite Duo or Group – Country
Carrie Underwood; Miranda Lambert; Maren Morris	Little Big Town; Florida Georgia Line; Old Dominion
Favorite Album – Country	Favorite Song – Country
Ripcord – Keith Urban; They Don't Know – Jason Aldean; From A Room: Volume 1 – Chris Stapleton	"Blue Ain't Your Color" – Keith Urban; "Body Like a Back Road" – Sam Hunt; "Dirt On My Boots" – Jon Pardi
Favorite Artist – Rap/Hip-Hop	Favorite Album – Rap/Hip-Hop
Drake; Kendrick Lamar; Migos	Damn – Kendrick Lamar; More Life – Drake; Culture – Migos
Favorite Song – Rap/Hip-Hop	Favorite Male Artist – Soul/R&B
"I'm the One" – DJ Khaled featuring Justin Bieber, Quavo, Chance the Rapper and Lil Wayne; "Humble" – Kendrick Lamar; "Black Beatles" – Rae Sremmurd featuring Gucci Mane	Bruno Mars; Childish Gambino; The Weeknd
Favorite Female Artist – Soul/R&B	Favorite Album – Soul/R&B
Beyoncé; Kehlani; Rihanna	24K Magic – Bruno Mars; "Awaken, My Love!" – Childish Gambino; Starboy – The Weeknd
Favorite Song – Soul/R&B	Favorite Artist – Alternative Rock
"That's What I Like" – Bruno Mars; "Location" – Khalid; "Starboy" – The Weeknd featuring Daft Punk	Linkin Park; Imagine Dragons; Twenty One Pilots
Favorite Artist – Adult Contemporary	Favorite Artist – Latin
Shawn Mendes; Bruno Mars; Ed Sheeran	Shakira; Daddy Yankee; Luis Fonsi
Favorite Artist – Contemporary Inspirational	Favorite Artist – Electronic Dance Music
Lauren Daigle; MercyMe; Chris Tomlin	The Chainsmokers; Calvin Harris; DJ Snake

== Special awards ==
Lifetime Achievement

- Diana Ross
