= American Music Award for Favorite Country Album =

American Music Award

American Music Awards for Favorite Country Album
- Country: United States
- Presented by: American Music Awards
- First award: 1974
- Currently held by: Megan Moroney – Cloud 9

Highlights
- Most wins: Carrie Underwood (6)
- Most nominations: Garth Brooks (10)
- Website: theamas.com

The American Music Award for Favorite Album – Country has been awarded since 1974. Years reflect the year in which the awards were presented, for works released in the previous year (until 2003 onward when awards were handed out on November of the same year). The all-time winner in this category is Carrie Underwood with 6 wins; Underwood is also the only artist in the show's history to have all six consecutive albums win. Garth Brooks is the most nominated artist with 10 nominations.

== Winners and nominees ==
=== 1970s ===
Year	Artist	Album	Ref
1974 (1st)
1974 (1st)	Charley Pride	A Sunshiny Day with Charley Pride	
1974 (1st)	Charlie Rich	Behind Closed Doors	
1974 (1st)	Tammy Wynette	First Songs of the First Lady	
1975 (2nd)
1975 (2nd)	Olivia Newton-John	Let Me Be There	
1975 (2nd)	Charlie Rich	A Very Special Love Song	
1975 (2nd)	Charlie Rich	Behind Closed Doors	
1976 (3rd)
1976 (3rd)	John Denver	Back Home Again	
1976 (3rd)	Freddy Fender	Before the Next Teardrop Falls	
1976 (3rd)	Olivia Newton-John	Have You Never Been Mellow	
1977 (4th)
1977 (4th)	Glen Campbell	Rhinestone Cowboy	
1977 (4th)	Ronnie Milsap	20/20 Vision	
1977 (4th)	Willie Nelson	Red Headed Stranger	
1978 (5th)
1978 (5th)	Dolly Parton	New Harvest – First Gathering	
1978 (5th)	Waylon Jennings	Are You Ready for the Country	
1978 (5th)	Waylon Jennings	Ol' Waylon	
1979 (6th)
1979 (6th)	Kenny Rogers	Ten Years of Gold	
1979 (6th)	Dolly Parton	Here You Come Again	
1979 (6th)	Linda Ronstadt	Simple Dreams	

=== 1980s ===
Year	Artist	Album	Ref
1980 (7th)
1980 (7th)	Kenny Rogers	The Gambler	
1980 (7th)	Crystal Gayle	Miss the Mississippi	
1980 (7th)	Waylon Jennings	Greatest Hits	
1981 (8th)
1981 (8th)	Kenny Rogers	The Gambler	
1981 (8th)	Waylon Jennings	Music Man	
1981 (8th)	Kenny Rogers	Ten Years of Gold	
1982 (9th)
1982 (9th)	Kenny Rogers	Greatest Hits	
1982 (9th)	Alabama	Feels So Right	
1982 (9th)	Waylon Jennings	Greatest Hits	
1982 (9th)	Anne Murray	Anne Murray's Greatest Hits	
1983 (10th)
1983 (10th)	Willie Nelson	Always on My Mind	
1983 (10th)	Alabama	Mountain Music	
1983 (10th)	The Oak Ridge Boys	Fancy Free	
1984 (11th)
1984 (11th)	Alabama	The Closer You Get...	
1984 (11th)	Lee Greenwood	Somebody's Gonna Love You	
1984 (11th)	Merle Haggard and Willie Nelson	Pancho & Lefty	
1984 (11th)	Ricky Skaggs	Highways & Heartaches	
1985 (12th)
1985 (12th)	Kenny Rogers	Eyes That See in the Dark	
1985 (12th)	Alabama	Roll On	
1985 (12th)	Ricky Skaggs	Don't Cheat in Our Hometown	
1986 (13th)
1986 (13th)	Alabama	40-Hour Week	
1986 (13th)	Willie Nelson	City of New Orleans	
1986 (13th)	Ricky Skaggs	Country Boy	
1987 (14th)
1987 (14th)	Alabama	Greatest Hits	
1987 (14th)	The Judds	Rockin' with the Rhythm	
1987 (14th)	Reba McEntire	Whoever's in New England	
1987 (14th)	George Strait	Something Special	
1988 (15th)
1988 (15th)	Randy Travis	Always & Forever	
1988 (15th)	The Judds	Heartland	
1988 (15th)	George Strait	Ocean Front Property	
1989 (16th)
1989 (16th)	Randy Travis	Always & Forever	
1989 (16th)	George Strait	If You Ain't Lovin' You Ain't Livin'	
1989 (16th)	Ricky Van Shelton	Wild-Eyed Dream	

=== 1990s ===
Year	Artist	Album	Ref
1990 (17th)
1990 (17th)	Randy Travis	Old 8×10	
1990 (17th)	George Strait	Beyond the Blue Neon	
1990 (17th)	Hank Williams Jr.	Greatest Hits, Vol. 3	
1991 (18th)
1991 (18th)	Reba McEntire	Reba Live	
1991 (18th)	Clint Black	Killin' Time	
1991 (18th)	George Strait	Livin' It Up	
1992 (19th)
1992 (19th)	Garth Brooks	No Fences	
1992 (19th)	Clint Black	Put Yourself in My Shoes	
1992 (19th)	Garth Brooks	Ropin' the Wind	
1992 (19th)	Alan Jackson	Don't Rock the Jukebox	
1992 (19th)	Travis Tritt	It's All About to Change	
1993 (20th)
1993 (20th)	Reba McEntire	For My Broken Heart	
1993 (20th)	Garth Brooks	The Chase	
1993 (20th)	Billy Ray Cyrus	Some Gave All	
1994 (21st)
1994 (21st)	Alan Jackson	A Lot About Livin' (And a Little 'bout Love)	
1994 (21st)	Brooks & Dunn	Hard Workin' Man	
1994 (21st)	Garth Brooks	In Pieces	
1994 (21st)	Reba McEntire	It's Your Call	
1995 (22nd)
1995 (22nd)	Reba McEntire	Read My Mind	
1995 (22nd)	Alan Jackson	Who I Am	
1995 (22nd)	Various Artists	Common Thread: The Songs of the Eagles	
1996 (23rd)
1996 (23rd)	Garth Brooks	The Hits	
1996 (23rd)	Brooks & Dunn	Waitin' on Sundown	
1996 (23rd)	Shania Twain	The Woman in Me	
1997 (24th)
1997 (24th)	George Strait	Blue Clear Sky	
1997 (24th)	Garth Brooks	Fresh Horses	
1997 (24th)	Shania Twain	The Woman in Me	
1998 (25th)
1998 (25th)	George Strait	Carrying Your Love with Me	
1998 (25th)	Tim McGraw	Everywhere	
1998 (25th)	LeAnn Rimes	Unchained Melody: The Early Years	
1998 (25th)	Trisha Yearwood	(Songbook) A Collection of Hits	
1999 (26th)
1999 (26th)	Garth Brooks	Sevens	
1999 (26th)	George Strait	One Step at a Time	
1999 (26th)	Shania Twain	Come On Over	

=== 2000s ===
Year	Artist	Album	Ref
2000 (27th)
2000 (27th)	Garth Brooks	Double Live	
2000 (27th)	Dixie Chicks	Fly	
2000 (27th)	George Strait	Always Never the Same	
2001 (28th)
2001 (28th)	Faith Hill	Breathe	
2001 (28th)	Alan Jackson	Under the Influence	
2001 (28th)	Toby Keith	How Do You Like Me Now?!	
2002 (29th)
2002 (29th)	Tim McGraw	Set This Circus Down	
2002 (29th)	Brooks & Dunn	Steers & Stripes	
2002 (29th)	Lonestar	I'm Already There	
2003 (30th)
2003 (30th)	Dixie Chicks	Home	
2003 (30th)	Kenny Chesney	No Shoes, No Shirt, No Problems	
2003 (30th)	Alan Jackson	Drive	
2003 (30th)	Toby Keith	Unleashed	
2003 (31st)
2003 (31st)	Toby Keith	Unleashed	
2003 (31st)	Tim McGraw	Tim McGraw and the Dancehall Doctors	
2003 (31st)	Rascal Flatts	Melt	
2003 (31st)	Shania Twain	Up!	
2004 (32nd)
2004 (32nd)	Toby Keith	Shock'n Y'all	
2004 (32nd)	Kenny Chesney	When the Sun Goes Down	
2004 (32nd)	Martina McBride	Martina	
2005 (33rd)
2005 (33rd)	Tim McGraw	Live Like You Were Dying	
2005 (33rd)	Toby Keith	Honkytonk University	
2005 (33rd)	Gretchen Wilson	Here for the Party	
2006 (34th)
2006 (34th)	Tim McGraw	Reflected: Greatest Hits Vol. 2	
2006 (34th)	Johnny Cash	The Legend of Johnny Cash	
2006 (34th)	Rascal Flatts	Me and My Gang	
2007 (35th)
2007 (35th)	Carrie Underwood	Some Hearts	
2007 (35th)	Rascal Flatts	Me and My Gang	
2007 (35th)	Tim McGraw	Let It Go	
2008 (36th)
2008 (36th)	Carrie Underwood	Carnival Ride	
2008 (36th)	Garth Brooks	The Ultimate Hits	
2008 (36th)	Rascal Flatts	Still Feels Good	
2009 (37th)
2009 (37th)	Taylor Swift	Fearless	
2009 (37th)	Rascal Flatts	Unstoppable	
2009 (37th)	Zac Brown Band	The Foundation	

=== 2010s ===
Year	Artist	Album	Ref
2010 (38th)
2010 (38th)	Carrie Underwood	Play On	
2010 (38th)	Jason Aldean	Wide Open	
2010 (38th)	Lady Antebellum	Need You Now	
2011 (39th)
2011 (39th)	Taylor Swift	Speak Now	
2011 (39th)	Jason Aldean	My Kinda Party	
2011 (39th)	The Band Perry	The Band Perry	
2012 (40th)
2012 (40th)	Carrie Underwood	Blown Away	
2012 (40th)	Luke Bryan	Tailgates & Tanlines	
2012 (40th)	Lionel Richie	Tuskegee	
2013 (41st)
2013 (41st)	Taylor Swift	Red	
2013 (41st)	Luke Bryan	Crash My Party	
2013 (41st)	Florida Georgia Line	Here's to the Good Times	
2014 (42nd)
2014 (42nd)	Brantley Gilbert	Just as I Am	
2014 (42nd)	Garth Brooks	Blame It All on My Roots: Five Decades of Influences	
2014 (42nd)	Eric Church	The Outsiders	
2015 (43rd)
2015 (43rd)	Florida Georgia Line	Anything Goes	
2015 (43rd)	Jason Aldean	Old Boots, New Dirt	
2015 (43rd)	Sam Hunt	Montevallo	
2016 (44th)
2016 (44th)	Carrie Underwood	Storyteller	
2016 (44th)	Luke Bryan	Kill the Lights	
2016 (44th)	Chris Stapleton	Traveller	
2017 (45th)
2017 (45th)	Keith Urban	Ripcord	
2017 (45th)	Jason Aldean	They Don't Know	
2017 (45th)	Chris Stapleton	From A Room: Volume 1	
2018 (46th)
2018 (46th)	Kane Brown	Kane Brown	
2018 (46th)	Luke Combs	This One's for You	
2018 (46th)	Thomas Rhett	Life Changes	
2019 (47th)
2019 (47th)	Carrie Underwood	Cry Pretty	
2019 (47th)	Dan + Shay	Dan + Shay	
2019 (47th)	Kane Brown	Experiment	

=== 2020s ===
Year	Artist	Album	Ref
2020 (48th)	Blake Shelton	Fully Loaded: God's Country	
2020 (48th)	Luke Combs	What You See Is What You Get	
2020 (48th)	Morgan Wallen	If I Know Me	
2021 (49th)	Gabby Barrett	Goldmine	
2021 (49th)	Lee Brice	Hey World	
2021 (49th)	Luke Bryan	Born Here Live Here Die Here	
2021 (49th)	Chris Stapleton	Starting Over	
2021 (49th)	Morgan Wallen	Dangerous: The Double Album	
2022 (50th)	Taylor Swift	Red (Taylor's Version)	
2022 (50th)	Luke Combs	Growin' Up	
2022 (50th)	Walker Hayes	Country Stuff: The Album	
2022 (50th)	Cody Johnson	Human: The Double Album	
2022 (50th)	Carrie Underwood	Denim & Rhinestones	
2025 (51st)	Beyoncé	Cowboy Carter	
2025 (51st)	Jelly Roll	Beautifully Broken	
2025 (51st)	Megan Moroney	Am I Okay?	
2025 (51st)	Post Malone	F-1 Trillion	
2025 (51st)	Shaboozey	Where I've Been, Isn't Where I'm Going	
2026 (52nd)	Megan Moroney	Cloud 9	
2026 (52nd)	BigXthaPlug	I Hope You're Happy	
2026 (52nd)	Morgan Wallen	I'm the Problem	
2026 (52nd)	Sam Barber	Restless Mind	
2026 (52nd)	Tucker Wetmore	What Not To	

== Category facts ==
=== Multiple wins ===
6 wins

- Carrie Underwood

5 wins

- Kenny Rogers

4 wins

- Garth Brooks
- Taylor Swift

3 wins

- Alabama
- Reba McEntire
- Tim McGraw
- Randy Travis

2 wins

- Toby Keith
- George Strait

=== Multiple nominations ===
10 nominations

- Garth Brooks

9 nominations

- George Strait

7 nominations

- Carrie Underwood

6 nominations

- Alabama
- Tim McGraw
- Kenny Rogers

5 nominations

- Alan Jackson
- Waylon Jennings
- Toby Keith
- Reba McEntire
- Rascal Flatts

4 nominations

- Jason Aldean
- Willie Nelson
- Shania Twain

3 nominations

- Brooks & Dunn
- Luke Bryan
- Charlie Rich
- Ricky Skaggs
- Taylor Swift
- Randy Travis
- Morgan Wallen

2 nominations

- Clint Black
- Kenny Chesney
- Dixie Chicks
- Florida Georgia Line
- The Judds
- Megan Moroney
- Olivia Newton-John
- Dolly Parton
- Chris Stapleton
