= American Music Award for Best Female R&B Artist =

Music award category

American Music Awards for Best Female R&B Artist
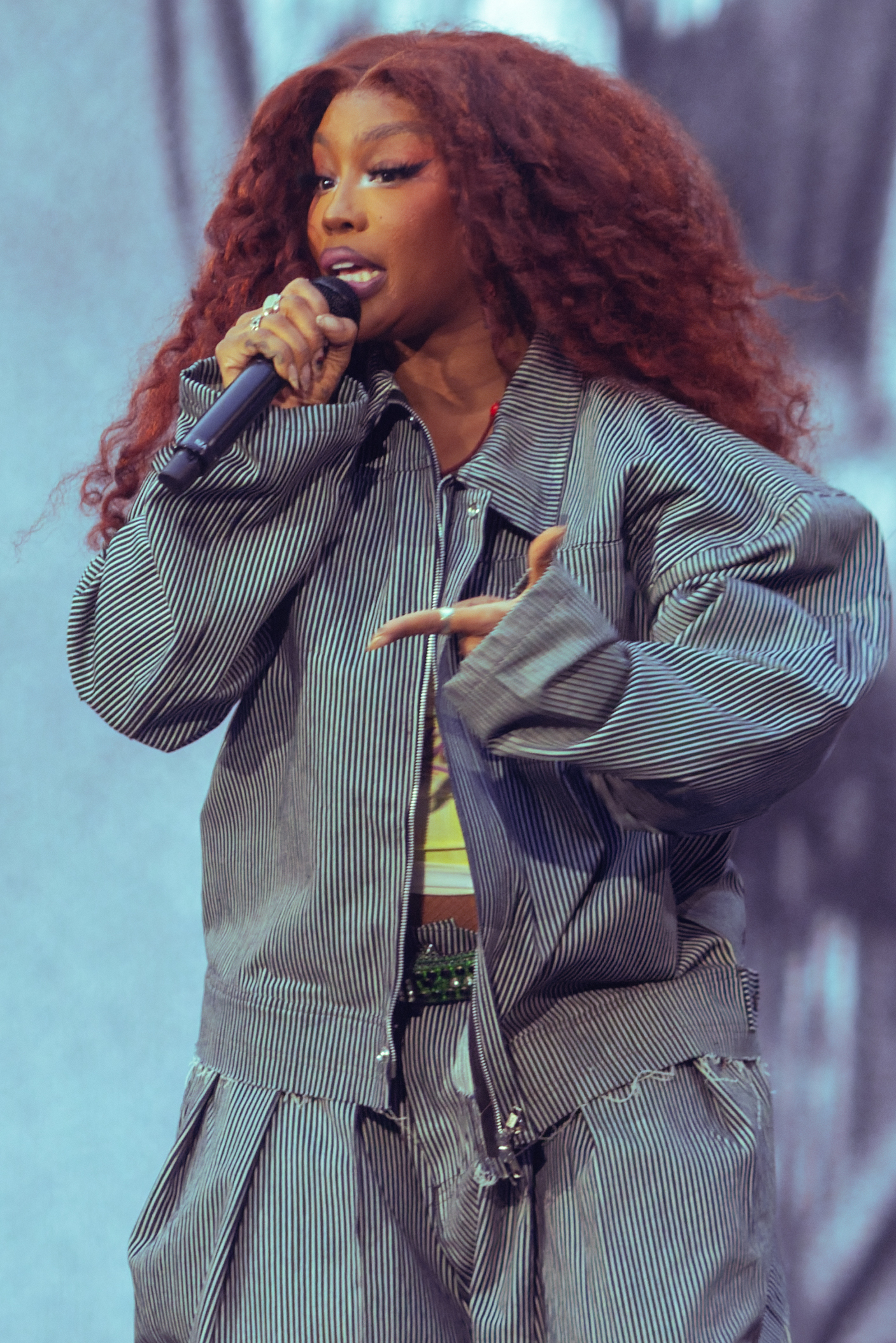
- SZA is the most recent recipient
- Country: United States
- Presented by: American Music Awards
- First award: 1974
- Currently held by: SZA

Highlights
- Most wins: Beyoncé, Rihanna (7)
- Most nominations: Beyoncé (12)
- Website: theamas.com

The American Music Award for Best Female R&B Artist (formerly known as Favorite Female Artist – Soul/R&B 1974-2025) has been awarded since 1974. Years reflect the year during which the awards were presented, for works released in the previous year (until 2003 onward, when awards were handed out on November of the same year). Beyoncé and Rihanna are tied for the most wins in this category, with 7 wins. Beyoncé is the most nominated artist, with 11 nominations.

== Winners and nominees ==
=== 1970s ===
Year	Artist	Ref
1974 (1st)
1974 (1st)	Roberta Flack	
1974 (1st)	Aretha Franklin	
1974 (1st)	Betty Wright	
1975 (2nd)
1975 (2nd)	Diana Ross	
1975 (2nd)	Roberta Flack	
1975 (2nd)	Aretha Franklin	
1976 (3rd)
1976 (3rd)	Aretha Franklin	
1976 (3rd)	Gwen McCrae	
1976 (3rd)	Minnie Riperton	
1977 (4th)
1977 (4th)	Aretha Franklin	
1977 (4th)	Natalie Cole	
1977 (4th)	Diana Ross	
1978 (5th)
1978 (5th)	Natalie Cole	
1978 (5th)	Aretha Franklin	
1978 (5th)	Donna Summer	
1979 (6th)
1979 (6th)	Natalie Cole	
1979 (6th)	Roberta Flack	
1979 (6th)	Donna Summer	

=== 1980s ===
Year	Artist	Ref
1980 (7th)
1980 (7th)	Donna Summer	
1980 (7th)	Gloria Gaynor	
1980 (7th)	Stephanie Mills	
1981 (8th)
1981 (8th)	Diana Ross	
1981 (8th)	Chaka Khan	
1981 (8th)	Stephanie Mills	
1982 (9th)
1982 (9th)	Stephanie Mills	
1982 (9th)	Chaka Khan	
1982 (9th)	Stacy Lattisaw	
1982 (9th)	Teena Marie	
1983 (10th)
1983 (10th)	Diana Ross	
1983 (10th)	Aretha Franklin	
1983 (10th)	Evelyn "Champagne" King	
1984 (11th)
1984 (11th)	Aretha Franklin	
1984 (11th)	Angela Bofill	
1984 (11th)	Irene Cara	
1984 (11th)	Donna Summer	
1985 (12th)
1985 (12th)	Tina Turner	
1985 (12th)	Sheila E.	
1985 (12th)	Chaka Khan	
1986 (13th)
1986 (13th)	Aretha Franklin	
1986 (13th)	Whitney Houston	
1986 (13th)	Diana Ross	
1987 (14th)
1987 (14th)	Whitney Houston	
1987 (14th)	Anita Baker	
1987 (14th)	Janet Jackson	
1987 (14th)	Patti LaBelle	
1988 (15th)
1988 (15th)	Anita Baker	
1988 (15th)	Whitney Houston	
1988 (15th)	Janet Jackson	
1989 (16th)
1989 (16th)	Whitney Houston	
1989 (16th)	Natalie Cole	
1989 (16th)	Sade	

=== 1990s ===
Year	Artist	Ref
1990 (17th)
1990 (17th)	Anita Baker	
1990 (17th)	Paula Abdul	
1990 (17th)	Stephanie Mills	
1991 (18th)
1991 (18th)	Janet Jackson	
1991 (18th)	Regina Belle	
1991 (18th)	Mariah Carey	
1991 (18th)	Miki Howard	
1991 (18th)	Lisa Stansfield	
1992 (19th)
1992 (19th)	Mariah Carey	
1992 (19th)	Natalie Cole	
1992 (19th)	Whitney Houston	
1993 (20th)
1993 (20th)	Patti LaBelle	
1993 (20th)	Mary J. Blige	
1993 (20th)	Mariah Carey	
1993 (20th)	Vanessa Williams	
1994 (21st)
1994 (21st)	Whitney Houston	
1994 (21st)	Toni Braxton	
1994 (21st)	Mariah Carey	
1994 (21st)	Janet Jackson	
1995 (22nd)
1995 (22nd)	Anita Baker	
1995 (22nd)	Toni Braxton	
1995 (22nd)	Janet Jackson	
1996 (23rd)
1996 (23rd)	Mariah Carey	
1996 (23rd)	Anita Baker	
1996 (23rd)	Brandy	
1997 (24th)
1997 (24th)	Toni Braxton	
1997 (24th)	Brandy	
1997 (24th)	Mariah Carey	
1998 (25th)
1998 (25th)	Mariah Carey	
1998 (25th)	Mary J. Blige	
1998 (25th)	Toni Braxton	
1999 (26th)
1999 (26th)	Janet Jackson	
1999 (26th)	Aaliyah	
1999 (26th)	Brandy	

=== 2000s ===
Year	Artist	Ref
2000 (27th)
2000 (27th)	Lauryn Hill	
2000 (27th)	Brandy	
2000 (27th)	Whitney Houston	
2001 (28th)
2001 (28th)	Toni Braxton	
2001 (28th)	Whitney Houston	
2001 (28th)	Kelly Price	
2002 (29th)
2002 (29th)	Aaliyah	
2002 (29th)	Mary J. Blige	
2002 (29th)	Alicia Keys	
2003 (30th)
2003 (30th)	Mary J. Blige	
2003 (30th)	Ashanti	
2003 (30th)	Jennifer Lopez	
2003 (31st)
2003 (31st)	Aaliyah	
2003 (31st)	Ashanti	
2003 (31st)	Beyoncé	
2004 (32nd)
2004 (32nd)	Alicia Keys	
2004 (32nd)	Beyoncé	
2004 (32nd)	Janet Jackson	
2005 (33rd)
2005 (33rd)	Mariah Carey	
2005 (33rd)	Ciara	
2005 (33rd)	Fantasia	
2006 (34th)
2006 (34th)	Mary J. Blige	
2006 (34th)	Mariah Carey	
2006 (34th)	Keyshia Cole	
2007 (35th)
2007 (35th)	Rihanna	
2007 (35th)	Beyoncé	
2007 (35th)	Fantasia	
2008 (36th)
2008 (36th)	Rihanna	
2008 (36th)	Mary J. Blige	
2008 (36th)	Alicia Keys	
2009 (37th)
2009 (37th)	Beyoncé	
2009 (37th)	Keyshia Cole	
2009 (37th)	Keri Hilson	

=== 2010s ===
Year	Artist	Ref
2010 (38th)
2010 (38th)	Rihanna	
2010 (38th)	Alicia Keys	
2010 (38th)	Sade	
2011 (39th)
2011 (39th)	Beyoncé	
2011 (39th)	Rihanna	
2011 (39th)	Kelly Rowland	
2012 (40th)
2012 (40th)	Beyoncé	
2012 (40th)	Mary J. Blige	
2012 (40th)	Rihanna	
2013 (41st)
2013 (41st)	Rihanna	
2013 (41st)	Ciara	
2013 (41st)	Alicia Keys	
2014 (42nd)
2014 (42nd)	Beyoncé	
2014 (42nd)	Jhené Aiko	
2014 (42nd)	Mary J. Blige	
2015 (43rd)
2015 (43rd)	Rihanna	
2015 (43rd)	Beyoncé	
2015 (43rd)	Mary J. Blige	
2016 (44th)
2016 (44th)	Rihanna	
2016 (44th)	Beyoncé	
2016 (44th)	Janet Jackson	
2017 (45th)
2017 (45th)	Beyoncé	
2017 (45th)	Kehlani	
2017 (45th)	Rihanna	
2018 (46th)
2018 (46th)	Rihanna	
2018 (46th)	Ella Mai	
2018 (46th)	SZA	
2019 (47th)
2019 (47th)	Beyoncé	
2019 (47th)	Ella Mai	
2019 (47th)	Lizzo	

=== 2020s ===
Year	Artist	Ref
2020 (48th)
2020 (48th)	Doja Cat	
2020 (48th)	Jhené Aiko	
2020 (48th)	Summer Walker	
2021 (49th)
2021 (49th)	Doja Cat	
2021 (49th)	H.E.R.	
2021 (49th)	Jazmine Sullivan	
2021 (49th)	Jhené Aiko	
2021 (49th)	SZA	
2022 (50th)
2022 (50th)	Beyoncé	
2022 (50th)	Doja Cat	
2022 (50th)	Muni Long	
2022 (50th)	Summer Walker	
2022 (50th)	SZA	
2023 – 24	—N/a	
2025 (51st)
2025 (51st)	SZA	
2025 (51st)	Kehlani	
2025 (51st)	Muni Long	
2025 (51st)	Summer Walker	
2025 (51st)	Tyla	
2026 (52nd)
2026 (52nd)	SZA	
2026 (52nd)	Kehlani	
2026 (52nd)	Summer Walker	
2026 (52nd)	Teyana Taylor	
2026 (52nd)	Tyla	

== Category facts ==
=== Multiple wins ===
7 wins

- Rihanna
- Beyoncé

4 wins

- Mariah Carey
- Aretha Franklin

3 wins

- Anita Baker
- Whitney Houston
- Diana Ross
- SZA

=== Multiple nominations ===
12 nominations

- Beyoncé

10 nominations

- Rihanna

9 nominations

- Mariah Carey

8 nominations

- Janet Jackson
- Aretha Franklin
- Whitney Houston

7 nominations

- Mary J. Blige

5 nominations

- Anita Baker
- Toni Braxton
- Natalie Cole
- Diana Ross
- SZA

== See also ==
- List of music awards honoring women
