= American Music Awards of 1977 =

US television program

4th Annual American Music Awards
- Date: January 31, 1977
- Country: United States
- Hosted by: Glen Campbell; Helen Reddy; Lou Rawls; Electric Light Orchestra

Highlights
- Most awards: Elton John; Loretta Lynn; Stevie Wonder (2 each)
- Most nominations: Earth, Wind & Fire (4)

Television/radio coverage
- Network: ABC
- Runtime: 120 min.
- Produced by: Dick Clark Productions

The fourth Annual American Music Awards were held on January 31, 1977.

== Winners and nominees ==
Pop/Rock Category
Category	Winner	Nominated
Favorite Pop/Rock Male Artist	Elton John	Barry Manilow; Peter Frampton
Favorite Pop/Rock Female Artist	Olivia Newton-John	Helen Reddy; Linda Ronstadt
Favorite Pop/Rock Band/Duo/Group	Chicago	Eagles; Earth, Wind & Fire
Favorite Pop/Rock Album	Eagles, Their Greatest Hits (1971–1975)	Peter Frampton, Frampton Comes Alive! Stevie Wonder, Songs in the Key of Life
Favorite Pop/Rock Song	Elton John & Kiki Dee, "Don't Go Breaking My Heart"	The Manhattans, "Kiss and Say Goodbye"; Wild Cherry, "Play That Funky Music"
Soul/R&B Category
Category	Winner	Nominated
Favorite Soul/R&B Male Artist	Stevie Wonder	Lou Rawls; Marvin Gaye
Favorite Soul/R&B Female Artist	Aretha Franklin	Diana Ross; Natalie Cole
Favorite Soul/R&B Band/Duo/Group	Earth, Wind & Fire	KC and the Sunshine Band; The O'Jays
Favorite Soul/R&B Album	Stevie Wonder, Songs in the Key of Life	Earth, Wind & Fire, Spirit; Earth, Wind & Fire, That's the Way of the World
Favorite Soul/R&B Song	Lou Rawls, "You'll Never Find Another Love Like Mine"; Wild Cherry, "Play That Funky Music"	
Country Category
Category	Winner	Nominated
Favorite Country Male Artist	Charley Pride	Conway Twitty; Freddy Fender
Favorite Country Female Artist	Loretta Lynn	Dolly Parton; Tanya Tucker
Favorite Country Band/Duo/Group	Conway Twitty & Loretta Lynn	George Jones & Tammy Wynette; The Statler Brothers
Favorite Country Album	Glen Campbell, Rhinestone Cowboy	Ronnie Milsap, 20/20 Vision; Willie Nelson, Red Headed Stranger
Favorite Country Song	Willie Nelson, "Blue Eyes Crying in the Rain"	C. W. McCall, "Convoy"; Loretta Lynn, "Somebody Somewhere (Don't Know What He's Missin' Tonight)"
Merit
Johnny Cash
