= American Music Awards =

Annual music awards show

- Current: American Music Awards of 2026
- Logo since 2019
- Awarded for: Outstanding achievements in the music industry
- Country: United States
- First award: February 19, 1974; 52 years ago
- Website: theamas.com

Television/radio coverage
- Network: ABC (1974–2022); CBS (since 2025)
- Produced by: Dick Clark Productions

The American Music Awards (AMAs) is an annual American music awards show produced by Dick Clark Productions since 1974. Nominees are selected on commercial performance such as sales and airplay. Winners are determined by a poll of the public who vote through the AMAs website and social media.

The event originally aired on ABC after the network's contract to air the Grammy Awards expired. After the 2022 ceremony, when ABC's rights to broadcast the ceremony expired, the American Music Awards were placed on a two-year hiatus. In March 2024, it was announced that the AMAs would move to CBS, as part of a package with its rights to the now DCP-owned Golden Globe Awards. The event remained on hiatus for 2024, but CBS aired a 50th anniversary special in October. The ceremony returned for 2025, moving to a new May scheduling.

Most recent American Music Award winners
- May 25, 2026
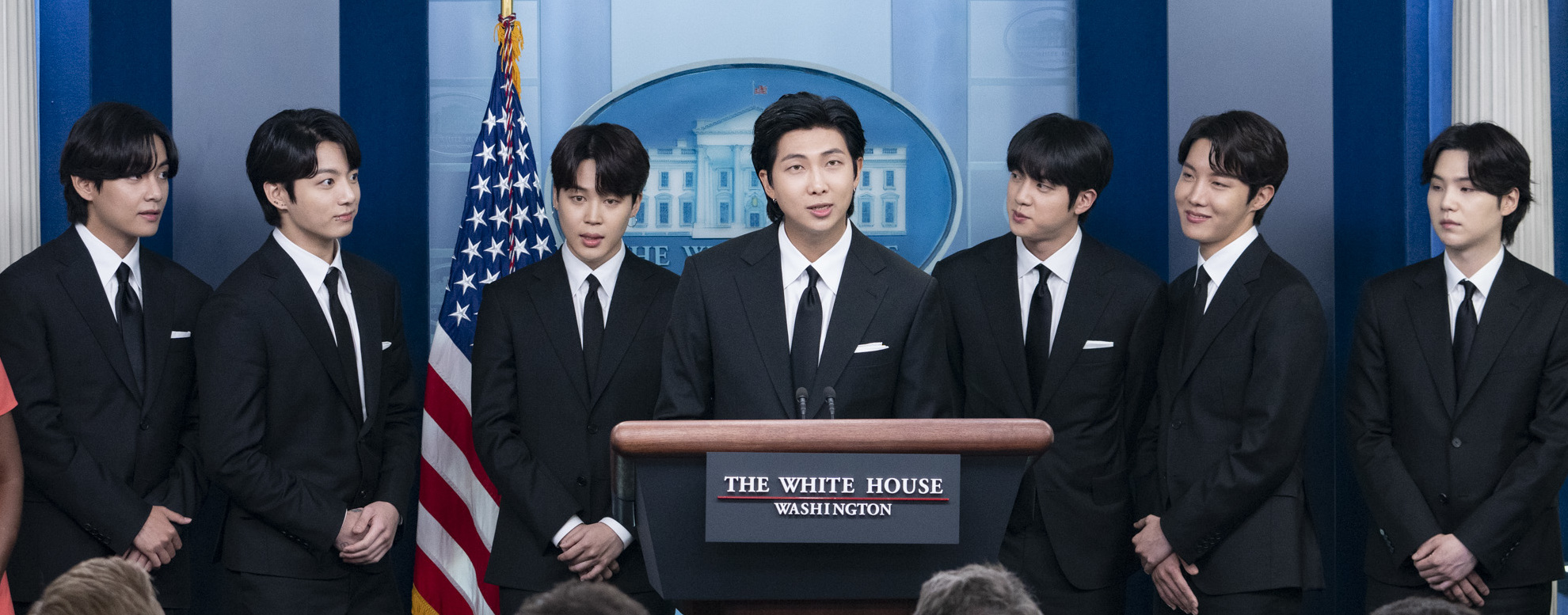

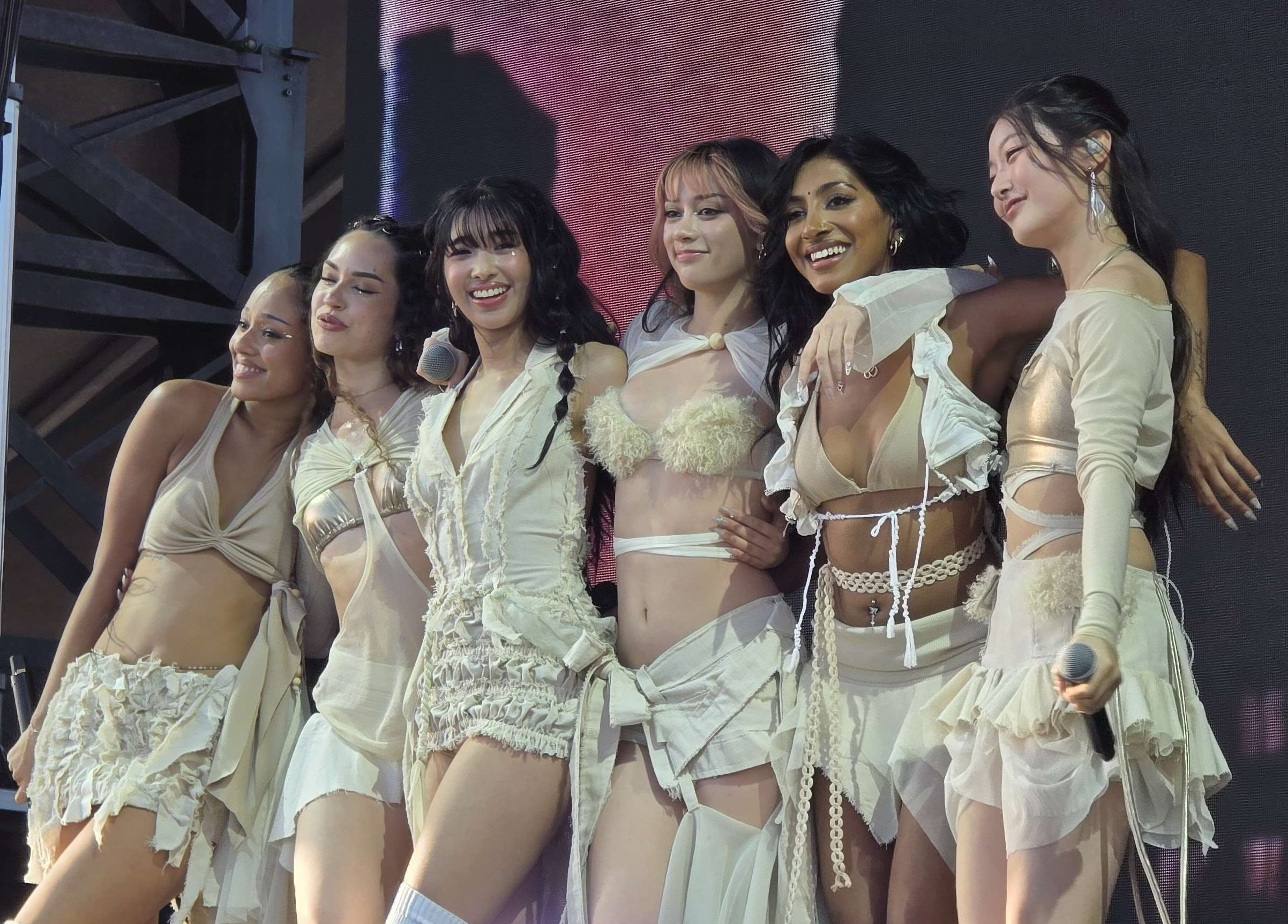

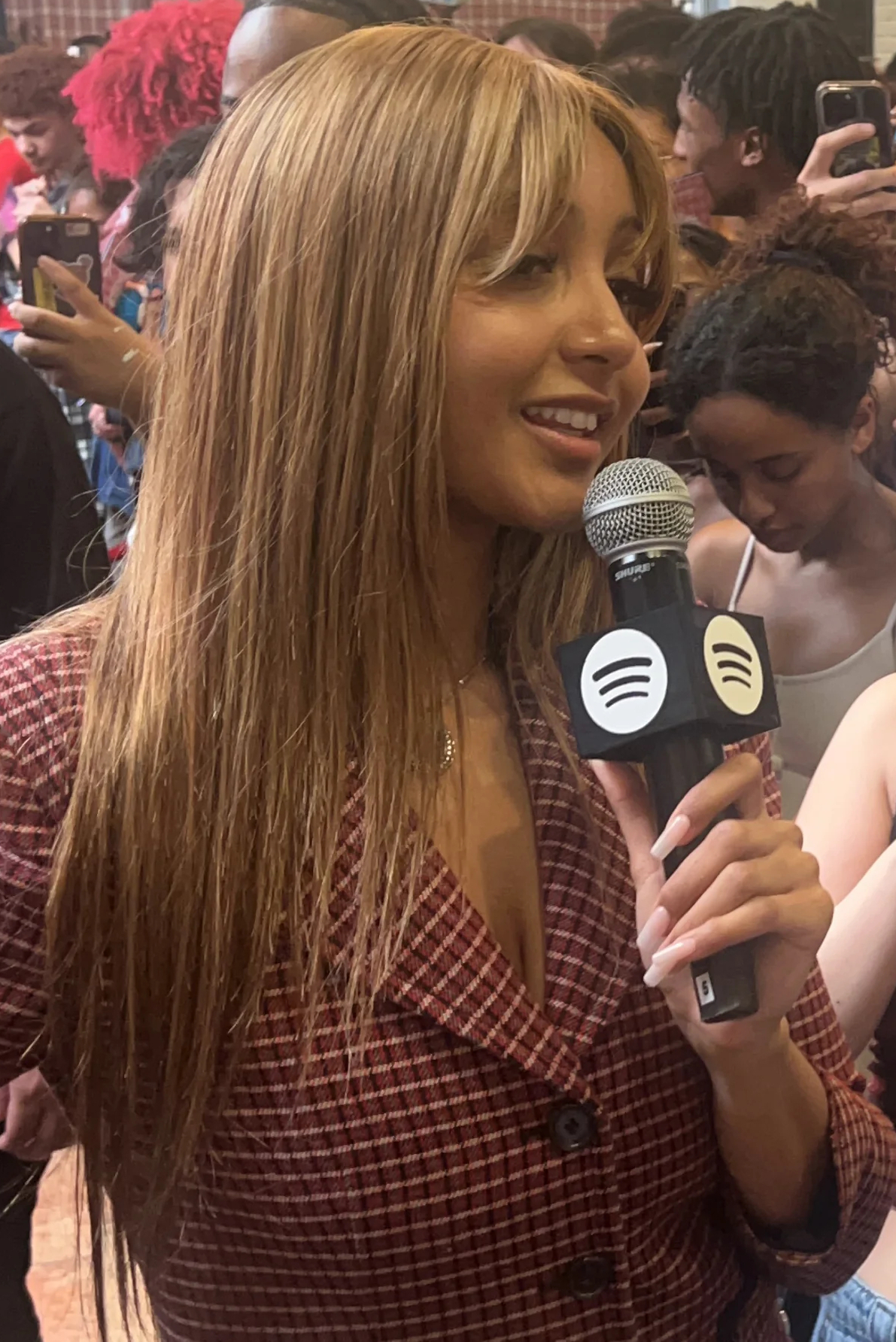

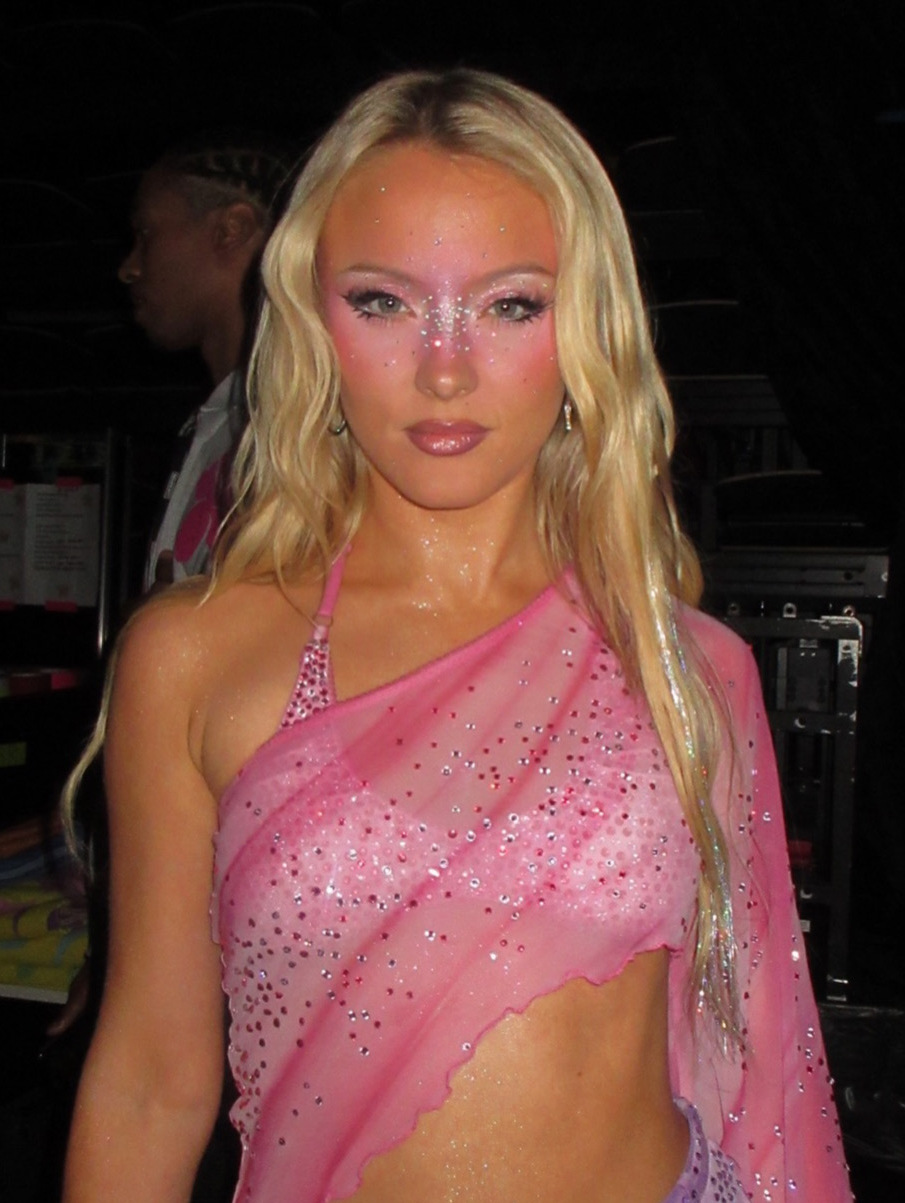

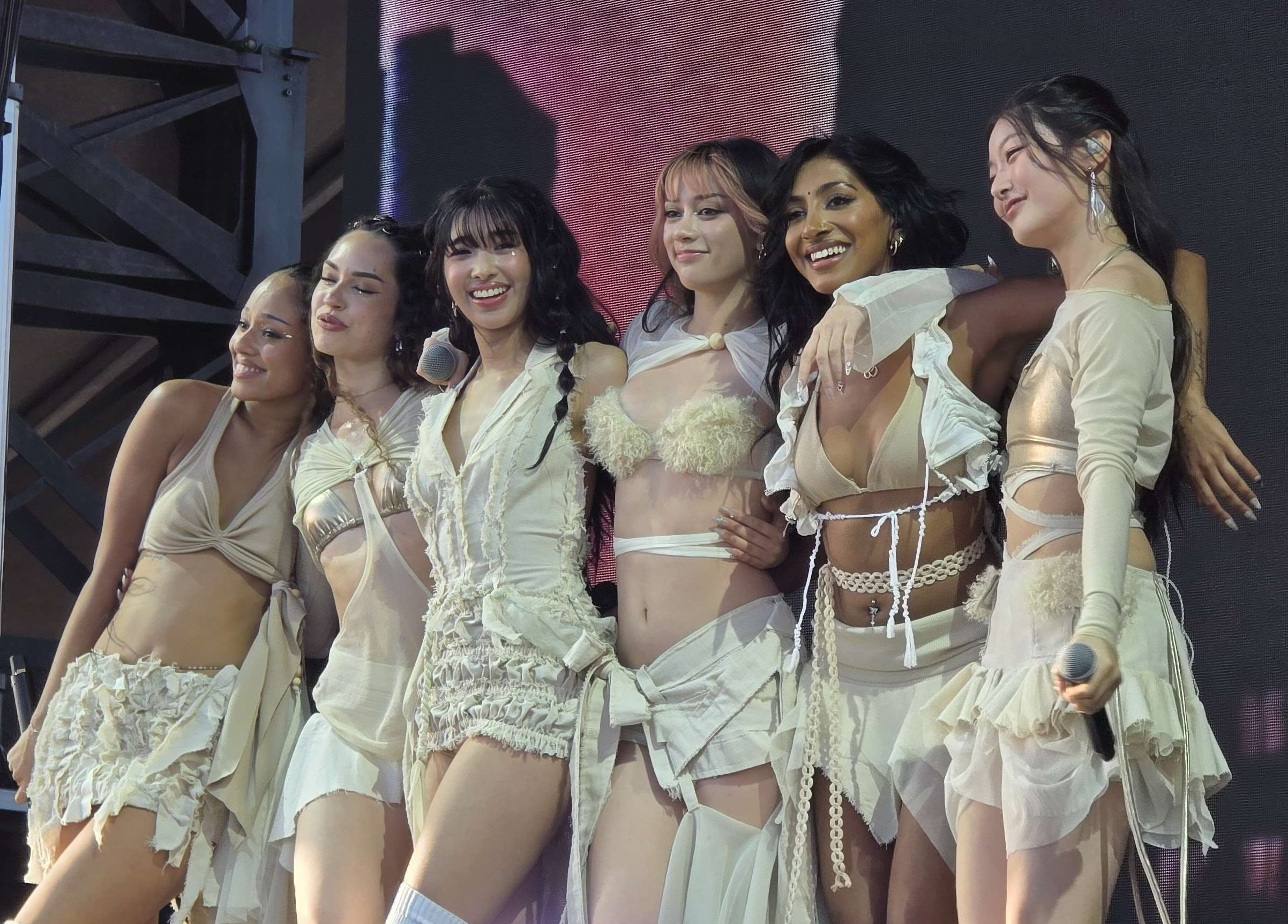
| Award | Artist of the Year | New Artist of the Year |
| Winner | BTS | Katseye |
| Award | Collaboration of the Year | Favorite Music Video |
| Winner | PinkPantheress Zara Larsson "Stateside" | Katseye "Gnarly" |
Previous Artist of the Year
Billie Eilish
Artist of the Year
BTS

== Conception ==
The AMAs was created by Dick Clark in 1973, to compete with the Grammy Awards after ABC's contact to air the Grammys expired and moved to CBS (which would broadcast all Grammy Awards shows until 2026, when ABC reacquired the rights to broadcast the Grammys starting in 2027), with that year's Grammys ceremony held in Nashville, Tennessee. In 2014, American network Telemundo acquired the rights to produce a Spanish-language version of the American Music Awards and launched the Latin American Music Awards in 2015.

Nominations are selected based on commercial performance, such as sales and airplay. Winners have been determined by a poll of the public, who could vote through the AMAs website and social media, while nominations have remained based on sales, airplay, activity on social networks, and video viewing. Before 2010, nominations were based only on sales and airplay and nominated every work, even if old. The Grammys have nominations based on vote of the Academy and only nominate a work from their eligibility period that changes often.

The award statuette is manufactured by New York firm Society Awards.

== History ==
The hosts for the first AMAs were Helen Reddy, Roger Miller, and Smokey Robinson. Reddy not only hosted the first show but also won the inaugural AMA for Favorite Pop/Rock Female Artist. For the first two decades, the AMAs had multiple hosts, each representing a genre of music. For instance, Glen Campbell, who co-hosted the AMAs five times, would host the country portion, while other artists would co-host to represent their genre. In recent years, however, there has been a single host.

In 1991, Keenen Ivory Wayans became the first Hollywood actor and comedian to host the AMAs.

The first two AMAs in 1974 and 1975 and the 1994 ceremony were held in February, but from 1976 to 1993 and 1995 through early 2003, the AMAs were held in mid- to late-January, but were moved to November (usually the Sunday before Thanksgiving) beginning in late 2003, in order to prevent the ceremony to further compete with other major awards shows (such as the Golden Globe Awards and the Academy Awards) and allowed for ABC to have a well-rated awards show during November sweeps.

For the 2008 awards, Jimmy Kimmel hosted for his fifth year, tying with Glen Campbell for the most AMAs hosted or co-hosted. From 2009 to 2012, there was no host. Instead, the AMAs followed the Grammys' lead in having various celebrities give introductions. However, the hosting portion would return after 2012, with rapper Pitbull hosting the ceremony in 2013 and 2014. Jennifer Lopez hosted in 2015 and 2025. Gigi Hadid and Jay Pharoah hosted in 2016. Tracee Ellis Ross hosted in 2017 and 2018. Ciara hosted in 2019.

Between 2012 and 2014, the American Music Awards used the lock screen wallpaper of Samsung Galaxy smartphones rather than envelopes to reveal winners, as part of a sponsorship by Samsung Electronics. A magnetic screen cover on each phone kept the wallpaper image with the winner's name secret until opened.

In August 2018, Dick Clark Productions announced a two-year sponsorship and content partnership with YouTube Music, which appeared to have only lasted for the 2018 ceremony, as there was no mention of it during the 2019 show.

In March 2023, it was announced that the Billboard Music Awards, which are also produced by DCP via co-owned Billboard, had been moved from May to the November scheduling that was typically occupied by the American Music Awards, leading to speculation that the AMAs would be discontinued in order to focus on the Billboard Music Awards, or at the very least cancelled for 2023, so it could move to May in its place. It was reported that the broadcast rights for both events (which had been held by NBC and ABC respectively) would also be shopped; the Billboard Music Awards moved to an online-only format in November 2023.

In March 2024, it was announced that CBS had acquired the rights to broadcast the AMAs in a deal of unspecified length. The rights were bundled with CBS's five-year agreement to televise the Golden Globe Awards, whose telecast has historically been produced by DCP, and whose assets had been acquired by DCP in 2023.

In August 2024, it was announced that the AMAs would return in May 2025. In place of a 2024 ceremony, DCP also announced that CBS would broadcast an AMAs 50th anniversary special on October 6, 2024 (marking 50 years since the inaugural ceremony in 1974), featuring performances and retrospectives highlighting the ceremony's history. Ratings for the special were up from the last ceremony aired on ABC, with an average of 6.1 million viewers. In February 2025, it was announced that the 51st ceremony would be held on May 26. In August 2025, CBS renewed its rights to broadcast the AMAs under a five-year agreement similar to that of the Golden Globe Awards; the ceremony will supplant the Grammy Awards on CBS's lineup after its move to ABC in 2027.

== Ceremonies ==
| Year | Order | Date of ceremony | Host(s) | Venue | Network |
|---|---|---|---|---|---|
| 1974 | 1 | February 19, 1974 | Roger Miller, Helen Reddy, Smokey Robinson | Earl Carroll Theatre | ABC |
| 1975 | 2 | February 18, 1975 | Roy Clark, Helen Reddy, Sly Stone | Santa Monica Civic Auditorium | ABC |
| 1976 | 3 | January 31, 1976 | Glen Campbell, Aretha Franklin, Olivia Newton-John | Santa Monica Civic Auditorium | ABC |
| 1977 | 4 | January 31, 1977 | Glen Campbell, Helen Reddy, Lou Rawls | Santa Monica Civic Auditorium | ABC |
| 1978 | 5 | January 16, 1978 | Glen Campbell, Natalie Cole, David Soul | Santa Monica Civic Auditorium | ABC |
| 1979 | 6 | January 12, 1979 | Glen Campbell, Helen Reddy, Donna Summer | Santa Monica Civic Auditorium | ABC |
| 1980 | 7 | January 18, 1980 | Elton John, Toni Tennille, Natalie Cole | ABC Studios | ABC |
| 1981 | 8 | January 30, 1981 | Mac Davis, Crystal Gayle, Teddy Pendergrass | ABC Studios | ABC |
| 1982 | 9 | January 25, 1982 | Glen Campbell, Sheena Easton, Donna Summer | Shrine Auditorium | ABC |
| 1983 | 10 | January 17, 1983 | Mac Davis, Aretha Franklin, Melissa Manchester | Shrine Auditorium | ABC |
| 1984 | 11 | January 16, 1984 | Lionel Richie | Shrine Auditorium | ABC |
| 1985 | 12 | January 28, 1985 | Lionel Richie | Shrine Auditorium | ABC |
| 1986 | 13 | January 27, 1986 | Diana Ross | Shrine Auditorium | ABC |
| 1987 | 14 | January 26, 1987 | Diana Ross | Shrine Auditorium | ABC |
| 1988 | 15 | January 25, 1988 | Barry Gibb, Maurice Gibb, Mick Fleetwood, Robin Gibb and Whitney Houston | Shrine Auditorium | ABC |
| 1989 | 16 | January 30, 1989 | Anita Baker, Debbie Gibson, Kenny Rogers and Rod Stewart | Shrine Auditorium | ABC |
| 1990 | 17 | January 22, 1990 | Alice Cooper, Anita Baker, Gloria Estefan, Naomi Judd and Wynonna Judd | Shrine Auditorium | ABC |
| 1991 | 18 | January 28, 1991 | Keenen Ivory Wayans | Shrine Auditorium | ABC |
| 1992 | 19 | January 27, 1992 | MC Hammer, Reba McEntire | Shrine Auditorium | ABC |
| 1993 | 20 | January 25, 1993 | Bobby Brown, Gloria Estefan and Wynonna Judd | Shrine Auditorium | ABC |
| 1994 | 21 | February 7, 1994 | Meat Loaf, Reba McEntire and Will Smith | Shrine Auditorium | ABC |
| 1995 | 22 | January 30, 1995 | Queen Latifah, Tom Jones, Lorrie Morgan | Shrine Auditorium | ABC |
| 1996 | 23 | January 29, 1996 | Sinbad | Shrine Auditorium | ABC |
| 1997 | 24 | January 27, 1997 | Sinbad | Shrine Auditorium | ABC |
| 1998 | 25 | January 26, 1998 | Drew Carey | Shrine Auditorium | ABC |
| 1999 | 26 | January 11, 1999 | Brandy and Melissa Joan Hart | Shrine Auditorium | ABC |
| 2000 | 27 | January 17, 2000 | Norm Macdonald | Shrine Auditorium | ABC |
| 2001 | 28 | January 8, 2001 | Britney Spears and LL Cool J | Shrine Auditorium | ABC |
| 2002 | 29 | January 9, 2002 | Jenny McCarthy and Sean Combs | Shrine Auditorium | ABC |
| 2003 (January) | 30 | January 13, 2003 | Jack Osbourne, Kelly Osbourne, Ozzy Osbourne and Sharon Osbourne | Shrine Auditorium | ABC |
| 2003 (November) | 31 | November 16, 2003 | Jimmy Kimmel | Shrine Auditorium | ABC |
| 2004 | 32 | November 14, 2004 | Jimmy Kimmel | Shrine Auditorium | ABC |
| 2005 | 33 | November 22, 2005 | Cedric the Entertainer | Shrine Auditorium | ABC |
| 2006 | 34 | November 21, 2006 | Jimmy Kimmel | Shrine Auditorium | ABC |
| 2007 | 35 | November 18, 2007 | Jimmy Kimmel | Peacock Theater | ABC |
| 2008 | 36 | November 23, 2008 | Jimmy Kimmel | Peacock Theater | ABC |
| 2009 | 37 | November 22, 2009 | No host | Peacock Theater | ABC |
| 2010 | 38 | November 21, 2010 | No host | Peacock Theater | ABC |
| 2011 | 39 | November 20, 2011 | No host | Peacock Theater | ABC |
| 2012 | 40 | November 18, 2012 | No host | Peacock Theater | ABC |
| 2013 | 41 | November 24, 2013 | Pitbull | Peacock Theater | ABC |
| 2014 | 42 | November 23, 2014 | Pitbull | Peacock Theater | ABC |
| 2015 | 43 | November 22, 2015 | Jennifer Lopez | Peacock Theater | ABC |
| 2016 | 44 | November 20, 2016 | Gigi Hadid and Jay Pharoah | Peacock Theater | ABC |
| 2017 | 45 | November 19, 2017 | Tracee Ellis Ross | Peacock Theater | ABC |
| 2018 | 46 | October 9, 2018 | Tracee Ellis Ross | Peacock Theater | ABC |
| 2019 | 47 | November 24, 2019 | Ciara | Peacock Theater | ABC |
| 2020 | 48 | November 22, 2020 | Taraji P. Henson | Peacock Theater | ABC |
| 2021 | 49 | November 21, 2021 | Cardi B | Peacock Theater | ABC |
| 2022 | 50 | November 20, 2022 | Wayne Brady | Peacock Theater | ABC |
Not held in 2023–2024
| 2025 | 51 | May 26, 2025 | Jennifer Lopez | Fontainebleau Las Vegas | CBS |
| 2026 | 52 | May 25, 2026 | Queen Latifah | MGM Grand Garden Arena | CBS |

== Categories ==
=== Current award categories ===
- Artist of the Year
- New Artist of the Year
- Album of the Year
- Song of the Year
- Collaboration of the Year
- Social Song of the Year
- Best Music Video
- Best Soundtrack
- Tour of the Year
- Breakthrough Touring Artist
- Breakthrough Album of the Year
- Throwback Song of the Year
- Best Vocal Performance
- Song of the Summer
- Best Male Pop Artist
- Best Female Pop Artist
- Breakthrough Pop Artist (1989–January 2003, 2026)
- Best Pop Album
- Best Pop Song
- Best Male R&B Artist
- Best Female R&B Artist
- Breakthrough R&B Artist (1989–January 2003, 2026)
- Best R&B Album
- Best R&B Song
- Best Male Country Artist
- Best Female Country Artist
- Best Country Duo or Group
- Breakthrough Country Artist (1989–January 2003, 2026)
- Best Country Album
- Best Country Song
- Best Male Hip Hop Artist
- Best Female Hip Hop Artist
- Breakthrough Hip Hop Artist (1990–1994, 2026)
- Best Hip Hop Album
- Best Hip Hop Song
- Best Male Latin Artist
- Best Female Latin Artist
- Best Latin Duo or Group
- Breakthrough Latin Artist
- Best Latin Album
- Best Latin Song
- Best Rock/Alternative Artist
- Breakthrough Rock/Alternative Artist
- Best Rock/Alternative Album
- Best Rock/Alternative Song
- Best Dance/Electronic Artist
- Best Male K-Pop Artist
- Best Female K-Pop Artist
- Best Afrobeats Artist
- Best Americana/Folk Artist

=== Discontinued awards ===
- Fan's Choice Award (2003)
- Favorite Social Artist (2018–2020)
- Favorite Trending Song (2021)
- Favorite Inspirational Artist (2002–2022)
- Favorite Gospel Artist (2021–2022)
- Favorite Pop Duo or Group (1974–2022)
- Favorite Pop/Rock Video (1984–1988)
- Favorite Pop/Rock Male Video Artist (1985–1987)
- Favorite Pop/Rock Female Video Artist (1985–1987)
- Favorite Pop/Rock Band/Duo/Group Video Artist (1985–1987)
- Favorite Soul/R&B Band/Duo/Group (1974–November 2003, 2005–2006, 2009)
- Favorite Soul/R&B Video (1984–1988)
- Favorite Soul/R&B Male Video Artist (1985–1987)
- Favorite Soul/R&B Female Video Artist (1985–1987)
- Favorite Soul/R&B Band/Duo/Group Video Artist (1985–1987)
- Favorite Country Video (1984–1988)
- Favorite Country Male Video Artist (1985–1987)
- Favorite Country Female Video Artist (1985–1987)
- Favorite Country Band/Duo/Group Video Artist (1985–1987)
- Favorite Rap/Hip-Hop Band/Duo/Group (2003–2008)
- Favorite Disco Male Artist (1979)
- Favorite Disco Female Artist (1979)
- Favorite Disco Band/Duo/Group (1979)
- Favorite Disco Album (1979)
- Favorite Disco Song (1979)
- Favorite Heavy Metal/Hard Rock Artist (1989–1997)
- Favorite Heavy Metal/Hard Rock Album (1989–1992)
- Favorite Heavy Metal/Hard Rock New Artist (1990–1993)
- Favorite Dance Artist (1990–1992)
- Favorite Dance Song (1990–1992)
- Favorite Dance New Artist (1990–1992)
- Favorite Adult Contemporary Artist (1992–2020)
- Favorite Adult Contemporary Album (1992–1994)
- Favorite Adult Contemporary New Artist (1992–1994)

== Most wins ==
The record for most American Music Awards won is held by Taylor Swift with 40 awards. The record for most American Music Awards won by a male artist is Michael Jackson with 26 awards. The record for most American Music Awards won by a group is Alabama with 18 awards.

| Rank | Artist | Number of awards |
|---|---|---|
| 1 | Taylor Swift | 40 |
| 2 | Michael Jackson | 26 |
| 3 | Whitney Houston | 22 |
| 4 | Kenny Rogers | 19 |
| 4 | Justin Bieber | 19 |
| 5 | Alabama | 18 |
| 6 | Carrie Underwood | 17 |
| 6 | Garth Brooks | 17 |
| 6 | Bruno Mars | 17 |
| 7 | Reba McEntire | 14 |
| 7 | BTS | 14 |
| 8 | Rihanna | 13 |
| 8 | Janet Jackson | 13 |
| 8 | Beyoncé (Note: Beyoncé has won a total of 18 awards in her career, including 5 as a member of Destiny's Child and 13 as a solo artist.) | 13 |
| 9 | Stevie Wonder | 11 |

=== Most wins in a single ceremony ===
The record for the most American Music Awards won in a single year is held by Michael Jackson (in 1984) and Whitney Houston (in 1994), each with eight awards (including the Award of Merit, with which both artists were honored in the respective years).

- Michael Jackson 8 (1984)
- Whitney Houston 8 (1994)

=== Most wins by category ===
The following list shows the artists with most wins in each category, adapted from the AMAs official website.

- Artist of the Year: Taylor Swift (7 wins)
- Collaboration of the Year: Justin Bieber, Camilla Cabello (3 wins)
- Favorite Music Video: Taylor Swift (3 wins)
- Favorite Pop Male Artist: Justin Bieber (5 wins)
- Favorite Pop Female Artist: Taylor Swift (7 wins)
- Favorite Pop Duo or Group: BTS (4 wins)
- Favorite Pop Album: Taylor Swift (5 wins)
- Favorite Pop Song: Boyz II Men, Justin Bieber, Lionel Richie, Whitney Houston (2 wins)
- Favorite Country Male Artist: Garth Brooks (8 wins)
- Favorite Country Female Artist: Reba McEntire (11 wins)
- Favorite Country Duo or Group: Alabama (17 wins)
- Favorite Country Album: Carrie Underwood (6 wins)
- Favorite Country Song: Kenny Rogers (5 wins)
- Favorite Hip-Hop Artist: Nicki Minaj, Eminem (5 wins)
- Favorite Hip-Hop Song: Cardi B (4 wins)
- Favorite Hip-Hop Album: Nicki Minaj, Eminem (3 wins)
- Favorite R&B Male Artist: Luther Vandross (7 wins)
- Favorite R&B Female Artist: Beyoncé, Rihanna (7 wins each)
- Favorite R&B Album: Michael Jackson (4 wins)
- Favorite R&B Song: Bruno Mars (4 wins)
- Favorite Rock Artist: Linkin Park (6 wins)
- Favorite Adult Contemporary Artist: Celine Dion (4 wins)
- Favorite Latin Artist: Enrique Iglesias (7 wins)
- Favorite Contemporary Inspirational Artist: Casting Crowns (4 wins)
- Favorite Dance/Electronic Artist: Marshmello (4 wins)

== Special awards ==
=== Award of Merit ===
The American Music Award of Merit has been awarded to 32 artists, the most recent being Sting in 2016.

=== International Artist Award of Excellence ===
The International Artist Award of Excellence (renamed Michael Jackson AMA International Artist Awards in 1993) is described as "an award which recognizes artists whose popularity and impact cross national boundaries and is only given when there is a deserving recipient who is worthy of recognition for their accomplishments" and has been awarded to eight artists:

- Michael Jackson (1993)
- Rod Stewart (1994)
- Led Zeppelin (1995)
- Bee Gees (1997)
- Aerosmith (2001)
- Beyoncé (2007)
- Whitney Houston (2009)
- Karol G (2026)

=== Icon Award ===
The Icon Award was introduced in the 2013 ceremony, producer Larry Klein stated that the award was created "to honor an artist whose body of work has made a profound influence over pop music on a global level."

- Rihanna (2013)
- Lionel Richie (2022)
- Janet Jackson (2025)

=== Dick Clark Award for Excellence ===
At the 2014 award ceremony, the Dick Clark Award for Excellence was given. It was created to recognize "an artist who achieves a groundbreaking feat or creates a landmark work."

- Taylor Swift (2014)

=== Award of Achievement ===
- Michael Jackson (1989)
- Prince (1990)
- Mariah Carey (2000 and 2008)
- Katy Perry (2011)

=== Lifetime Achievement Award ===
- Diana Ross (2017)
- Rod Stewart (2025)
- Billy Idol (2026)

=== Artist of the Decade ===
- 2010s: Taylor Swift (2019)
- 1990s: Garth Brooks (2000)

In 2000, the AMAs held a poll to elect the Artist of the Decade for each previous decade of the Rock and Roll era. According to some sources, the result of this poll is not counted in the total of AMAs won by these artists. The results were:

- 1950s: Elvis Presley
- 1960s: The Beatles
- 1970s: Stevie Wonder
- 1980s: Michael Jackson

=== Artist of the Century ===
In 2002, Michael Jackson received the Artist of the Century award for his "unparalleled influence and impact on the music industry."

=== Veterans Voice Award ===
The Veterans Voice Award was first given at the 2025 ceremony (which was held on Memorial Day). It recognizes artists who have impacted veterans and their families through their music and platform.

- Zac Brown (2025)
- Darius Rucker (2026)

== Ratings ==
| Year | Day | Date | Household rating | | 18–49 rating | | Viewers (in millions) | Ref. |
| Year | Day | Date | Rating | Share | Rating | Share | Viewers (in millions) | Ref. |
|---|---|---|---|---|---|---|---|---|
| 1974 | Tuesday | February 19 | 26.0 | 38 | | | 39.76 | |
| 1975 | Tuesday | February 18 | 21.3 | 32 | | | 32.21 | |
| 1976 | Saturday | January 31 | 20.5 | 39 | | | 30.02 | |
| 1977 | Monday | January 31 | 24.1 | 36 | | | 37.25 | |
| 1978 | Monday | January 16 | 25.9 | 38 | | | 41.86 | |
| 1979 | Friday | January 12 | 22.8 | 35 | | | 33.57 | |
| 1980 | Friday | January 18 | 17.3 | 28 | | | 26.03 | |
| 1981 | Friday | January 30 | 14.4 | 22 | | | 18.91 | |
| 1982 | Monday | January 25 | 21.5 | 32 | | | 33.43 | |
| 1983 | Monday | January 17 | 24.4 | 36 | | | 36.17 | |
| 1984 | Monday | January 16 | 27.4 | 41 | | | 47.11 | |
| 1985 | Monday | January 28 | 25.8 | 37 | | | 48.16 | |
| 1986 | Monday | January 27 | 20.4 | 30 | | | 33.18 | |
| 1987 | Monday | January 26 | 22.2 | 32 | | | 39.30 | |
| 1988 | Monday | January 25 | 18.1 | 35 | | | 28.41 | |
| 1989 | Monday | January 30 | 21.0 | 32 | | | 32.95 | |
| 1990 | Monday | January 22 | 20.0 | 30 | | | 32.43 | |
| 1991 | Monday | January 28 | 20.4 | 31 | | | 34.37 | |
| 1992 | Monday | January 27 | 18.3 | 28 | | | 29.93 | |
| 1993 | Monday | January 25 | 21.6 | 33 | | | 35.03 | |
| 1994 | Monday | February 7 | 16.0 | 24 | | | 24.52 | |
| 1995 | Monday | January 30 | 15.4 | 23 | | | 24.51 | |
| 1996 | Monday | January 29 | 13.8 | 21 | | | 21.57 | |
| 1997 | Monday | January 27 | 13.2 | 21 | | | 19.72 | |
| 1998 | Monday | January 26 | 12.1 | 19 | 8.1 | 20 | 18.36 | |
| 1999 | Monday | January 11 | 10.3 | 16 | | | 15.60 | |
| 2000 | Monday | January 17 | 10.4 | 16 | 7.2 | 17 | 16.68 | |
| 2001 | Monday | January 8 | 10.4 | 16 | 7.3 | 17 | 16.20 | |
| 2002 | Wednesday | January 9 | 9.9 | 16 | 7.3 | 18 | 16.02 | |
| 2003 | Monday | January 13 | 8.4 | 12 | 5.7 | 13 | 12.90 | |
| 2003 | Sunday | November 16 | 8.1 | 12 | 5.5 | 13 | 12.77 | |
| 2004 | Sunday | November 14 | 7.9 | 12 | 5.7 | 13 | 12.90 | |
| 2005 | Tuesday | November 22 | 7.4 | 11 | 4.4 | 11 | 11.68 | |
| 2006 | Tuesday | November 21 | 7.0 | 11 | 4.7 | 13 | 10.85 | |
| 2007 | Sunday | November 18 | 7.4 | 11 | 4.8 | 12 | 11.81 | |
| 2008 | Sunday | November 23 | 7.3 | 11 | 5.1 | 12 | 12.20 | |
| 2009 | Sunday | November 22 | 8.6 | 14 | 5.5 | 14 | 14.24 | |
| 2010 | Sunday | November 21 | 6.7 | 11 | 4.3 | 10 | 11.72 | |
| 2011 | Sunday | November 20 | 6.8 | 10 | 4.3 | 10 | 12.07 | |
| 2012 | Sunday | November 18 | 5.5 | 8 | 3.4 | 8 | 9.52 | |
| 2013 | Sunday | November 24 | 7.6 | 11 | 4.5 | 11 | 13.14 | |
| 2014 | Sunday | November 23 | 6.6 | 11 | 3.8 | 10 | 11.61 | |
| 2015 | Sunday | November 22 | 6.3 | 10 | 3.5 | 10 | 11.01 | |
| 2016 | Sunday | November 20 | 4.7 | 8 | 2.4 | 7 | 8.18 | |
| 2017 | Sunday | November 19 | 5.2 | 9 | 2.4 | 8 | 9.15 | |
| 2018 | Tuesday | October 9 | 4.1 | 8 | 1.8 | 8 | 6.59 | |
| 2019 | Sunday | November 24 | 3.9 | 8 | 1.7 | 7 | 6.68 | |
| 2020 | Sunday | November 22 | 2.4 | 5 | 1.0 | 6 | 4.01 | |
| 2021 | Sunday | November 21 | | | 1.0 | 7 | 4.01 | |
| 2022 | Sunday | November 20 | 2.0 | 5 | 0.6 | 5 | 3.53 | |
| 2025 | Monday | May 26 | 2.8 | 10 | 0.8 | 11 | 4.86 | |
| 2026 | Monday | May 25 | 2.2 | 7 | 0.5 | 7 | 3.74 | |

== See also ==
- Latin American Music Awards, Latin Music counterpart to the AMAs
