= American Music Award for Best Male R&B Artist =

Music award category

American Music Awards for Favorite Soul/R&B Male Artist
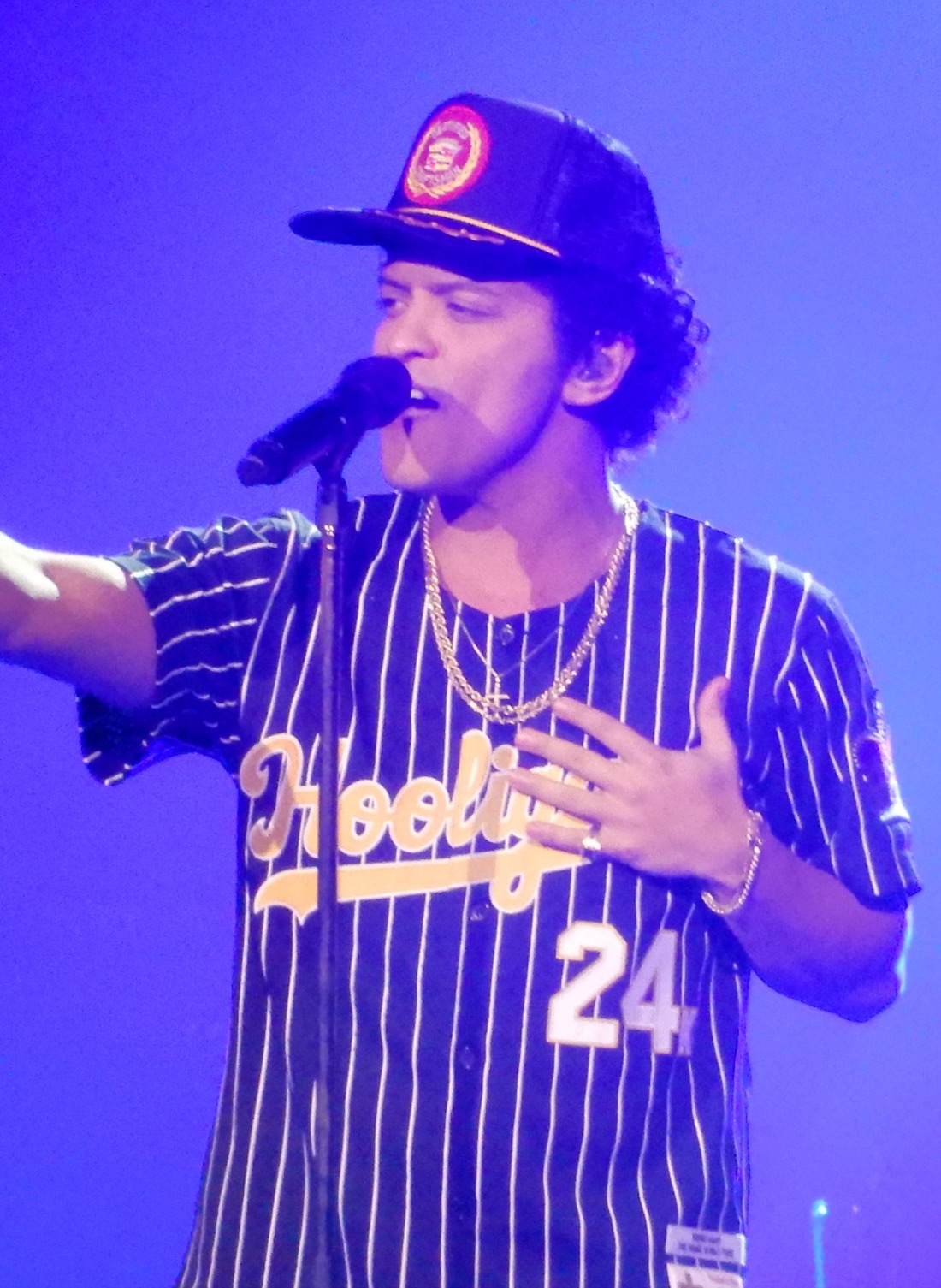
- Bruno Mars is the most recent recipient
- Country: United States
- Presented by: American Music Awards
- First award: 1974
- Currently held by: Bruno Mars

Highlights
- Most wins: Luther Vandross (7)
- Most nominations: Chris Brown (14)
- Website: theamas.com

The American Music Award for Favorite Male Artist – Soul/R&B has been awarded since 1974. Years reflect the year in which the awards were presented, for works released in the previous year (until 2003 onward when awards were handed out on November of the same year). The all-time winner in this category is Luther Vandross with 7 wins stretching across three decades. Chris Brown is the most nominated male artist with 14 nominations.

== Winners and nominees ==
=== 1970s ===
Year	Artist	Ref
1974 (1st)
1974 (1st)	Stevie Wonder	
1974 (1st)	James Brown	
1974 (1st)	Al Green	
1975 (2nd)
1975 (2nd)	Stevie Wonder	
1975 (2nd)	James Brown	
1975 (2nd)	Barry White	
1976 (3rd)
1976 (3rd)	Barry White	
1976 (3rd)	James Brown	
1976 (3rd)	Smokey Robinson	
1977 (4th)
1977 (4th)	Stevie Wonder	
1977 (4th)	Marvin Gaye	
1977 (4th)	Lou Rawls	
1978 (5th)
1978 (5th)	Stevie Wonder	
1978 (5th)	George Benson	
1978 (5th)	Barry White	
1979 (6th)
1979 (6th)	Teddy Pendergrass	
1979 (6th)	Lou Rawls	
1979 (6th)	Johnny Mathis	

=== 1980s ===
Year	Artist	Ref
1980 (7th)
1980 (7th)	Michael Jackson	
1980 (7th)	Rick James	
1980 (7th)	Teddy Pendergrass	
1981 (8th)
1981 (8th)	Michael Jackson	
1981 (8th)	George Benson	
1981 (8th)	Teddy Pendergrass	
1982 (9th)
1982 (9th)	Stevie Wonder	
1982 (9th)	Larry Graham	
1982 (9th)	Rick James	
1982 (9th)	Smokey Robinson	
1983 (10th)
1983 (10th)	Lionel Richie	
1983 (10th)	Rick James	
1983 (10th)	Stevie Wonder	
1984 (11th)
1984 (11th)	Michael Jackson	
1984 (11th)	Rick James	
1984 (11th)	Prince	
1984 (11th)	Lionel Richie	
1985 (12th)
1985 (12th)	Lionel Richie	
1985 (12th)	Michael Jackson	
1985 (12th)	Prince	
1986 (13th)
1986 (13th)	Stevie Wonder	
1986 (13th)	Prince	
1986 (13th)	Luther Vandross	
1987 (14th)
1987 (14th)	Lionel Richie	
1987 (14th)	Freddie Jackson	
1987 (14th)	Billy Ocean	
1987 (14th)	Stevie Wonder	
1988 (15th)
1988 (15th)	Luther Vandross	
1988 (15th)	LL Cool J	
1988 (15th)	Smokey Robinson	
1989 (16th)
1989 (16th)	George Michael	
1989 (16th)	Bobby Brown	
1989 (16th)	Michael Jackson	

=== 1990s ===
Year	Artist	Ref
1990 (17th)
1990 (17th)	Luther Vandross	
1990 (17th)	Bobby Brown	
1990 (17th)	Prince	
1991 (18th)
1991 (18th)	MC Hammer	
1991 (18th)	Quincy Jones	
1991 (18th)	Keith Sweat	
1992 (19th)
1992 (19th)	Luther Vandross	
1992 (19th)	LL Cool J	
1992 (19th)	Prince	
1993 (20th)
1993 (20th)	Bobby Brown	
1993 (20th)	Tevin Campbell	
1993 (20th)	Michael Jackson	
1993 (20th)	Gerald Levert	
1994 (21st)
1994 (21st)	Luther Vandross	
1994 (21st)	Babyface	
1994 (21st)	Bobby Brown	
1994 (21st)	Michael Jackson	
1995 (22nd)
1995 (22nd)	Babyface	
1995 (22nd)	Tevin Campbell	
1995 (22nd)	Prince	
1996 (23rd)
1996 (23rd)	Luther Vandross	
1996 (23rd)	Michael Jackson	
1996 (23rd)	Barry White	
1997 (24th)
1997 (24th)	Keith Sweat	
1997 (24th)	D'Angelo	
1997 (24th)	R. Kelly	
1998 (25th)
1998 (25th)	Babyface	
1998 (25th)	Puff Daddy	
1998 (25th)	Keith Sweat	
1999 (26th)
1999 (26th)	Will Smith	
1999 (26th)	Mase	
1999 (26th)	Brian McKnight	

=== 2000s ===
Year	Artist	Ref
2000 (27th)
2000 (27th)	R. Kelly	
2000 (27th)	Ginuwine	
2000 (27th)	Busta Rhymes	
2001 (28th)
2001 (28th)	Brian McKnight	
2001 (28th)	D'Angelo	
2001 (28th)	Sisqó	
2002 (29th)
2002 (29th)	Luther Vandross	
2002 (29th)	Ginuwine	
2002 (29th)	R. Kelly	
2003 (30th)
2003 (30th)	Eminem	
2003 (30th)	Ja Rule	
2003 (30th)	Nelly	
2003 (31st)
2003 (31st)	Luther Vandross	
2003 (31st)	Ginuwine	
2003 (31st)	Jaheim	
2003 (31st)	R. Kelly	
2004 (32nd)
2004 (32nd)	Usher	
2004 (32nd)	R. Kelly	
2004 (32nd)	Prince	
2004 (32nd)	Ruben Studdard	
2005 (33rd)
2005 (33rd)	R. Kelly	
2005 (33rd)	John Legend	
2005 (33rd)	Omarion	
2006 (34th)
2006 (34th)	Jamie Foxx	
2006 (34th)	Chris Brown	
2006 (34th)	Ne-Yo	
2007 (35th)
2007 (35th)	Akon	
2007 (35th)	Ne-Yo	
2007 (35th)	T-Pain	
2008 (36th)
2008 (36th)	Chris Brown	
2008 (36th)	J. Holiday	
2008 (36th)	Usher	
2009 (37th)
2009 (37th)	Michael Jackson	
2009 (37th)	Jamie Foxx	
2009 (37th)	Maxwell	

=== 2010s ===
Year	Artist	Ref
2010 (38th)
2010 (38th)	Usher	
2010 (38th)	Chris Brown	
2010 (38th)	Trey Songz	
2011 (39th)
2011 (39th)	Usher	
2011 (39th)	Chris Brown	
2011 (39th)	Trey Songz	
2012 (40th)
2012 (40th)	Usher	
2012 (40th)	Chris Brown	
2012 (40th)	Trey Songz	
2013 (41st)
2013 (41st)	Justin Timberlake	
2013 (41st)	Miguel	
2013 (41st)	Robin Thicke	
2014 (42nd)
2014 (42nd)	John Legend	
2014 (42nd)	Chris Brown	
2014 (42nd)	Pharrell Williams	
2015 (43rd)
2015 (43rd)	The Weeknd	
2015 (43rd)	Chris Brown	
2015 (43rd)	Trey Songz	
2016 (44th)
2016 (44th)	Chris Brown	
2016 (44th)	Bryson Tiller	
2016 (44th)	The Weeknd	
2017 (45th)
2017 (45th)	Bruno Mars	
2017 (45th)	Childish Gambino	
2017 (45th)	The Weeknd	
2018 (46th)
2018 (46th)	Khalid	
2018 (46th)	Bruno Mars	
2018 (46th)	The Weeknd	
2019 (47th)
2019 (47th)	Bruno Mars	
2019 (47th)	Chris Brown	
2019 (47th)	Khalid	

=== 2020s ===
Year	Artist	Ref
2020 (48th)
2020 (48th)	The Weeknd	
2020 (48th)	Chris Brown	
2020 (48th)	John Legend	
2021 (49th)
2021 (49th)	The Weeknd	
2021 (49th)	Chris Brown	
2021 (49th)	Giveon	
2021 (49th)	Tank	
2021 (49th)	Usher	
2022 (50th)
2022 (50th)	Chris Brown	
2022 (50th)	Brent Faiyaz	
2022 (50th)	Giveon	
2022 (50th)	Lucky Daye	
2022 (50th)	The Weeknd	
2023 – 24	—N/a	
2025 (51th)
2025 (51th)	The Weeknd	
2025 (51th)	Bryson Tiller	
2025 (51th)	Chris Brown	
2025 (51th)	PARTYNEXTDOOR	
2025 (51th)	Usher	
2026 (52nd)
2026 (52nd)	Bruno Mars	
2026 (52nd)	Chris Brown	
2026 (52nd)	Daniel Caesar	
2026 (52nd)	PARTYNEXTDOOR	
2026 (52nd)	The Weeknd	

== Category facts ==
=== Multiple wins ===
7 wins

- Luther Vandross

6 wins

- Stevie Wonder

4 wins

- Michael Jackson
- Usher
- The Weeknd

3 wins

- Chris Brown
- Lionel Richie
- Bruno Mars

2 wins

- Babyface
- R. Kelly

=== Multiple nominations ===
14 nominations

- Chris Brown

9 nominations

- Michael Jackson
- The Weeknd

8 nominations

- Luther Vandross
- Stevie Wonder

7 nominations

- Prince
- Usher

6 nominations

- R. Kelly

4 nominations

- Barry White
- Rick James
- Lionel Richie
- Bobby Brown
- Trey Songz
- Bruno Mars

3 nominations

- James Brown
- Smokey Robinson
- Teddy Pendergrass
- Keith Sweat
- Babyface
- Ginuwine
- John Legend

2 nominations

- Lou Rawls
- George Benson
- LL Cool J
- Tevin Campbell
- D'Angelo
- Brian McKnight
- Jamie Foxx
- Ne-Yo
- Khalid
- Giveon
- Bryson Tiller
