= American Music Awards of 1978 =

US television program

5th Annual American Music Awards
- Date: January 16, 1978
- Venue: Santa Monica Civic Auditorium, Santa Monica, California
- Country: United States
- Hosted by: Glen Campbell; David Soul; Natalie Cole

Television/radio coverage
- Network: ABC
- Runtime: 120 min.
- Produced by: Dick Clark Productions

The fifth Annual American Music Awards were held on January 16, 1978.

== Winners and nominees ==
Subcategory	Winner	Nominees
Pop/Rock Category
Favorite Pop/Rock Male Artist	Barry Manilow	Peter Frampton; Stevie Wonder
Favorite Pop/Rock Female Artist	Linda Ronstadt	Rita Coolidge; Barbra Streisand
Favorite Pop/Rock Band/Duo/Group	Fleetwood Mac	The Eagles; KC & The Sunshine Band
Favorite Pop/Rock Album	Rumours – Fleetwood Mac	Eagles, Hotel California; Star Wars
Favorite Pop/Rock Song	"You Light Up My Life" – Debby Boone	"I Just Want To Be Your Everything" – Andy Gibb "Star Wars Medley" – Meco
Soul/R&B Category
Favorite Soul/R&B Male Artist	Stevie Wonder	George Benson; Barry White
Favorite Soul/R&B Female Artist	Natalie Cole	Aretha Franklin; Donna Summer
Favorite Soul/R&B Band/Duo/Group	Earth Wind and Fire	Commodores; KC & The Sunshine Band
Favorite Soul/R&B Album	Songs in the Key of Life – Stevie Wonder	Commodores – Commodores; Barry White Sings for Someone You Love – Barry White
Favorite Soul/R&B Song	"Best of My Love" – The Emotions	"Brick House" – Commodores "It's Ecstasy When You Lay Down Next to Me" – Barry White
Country Category
Favorite Country Male Artist	Conway Twitty	Waylon Jennings; Kenny Rogers
Favorite Country Female Artist	Loretta Lynn	Crystal Gayle; Dolly Parton
Favorite Country Band/Duo/Group	Conway Twitty & Loretta Lynn	George Jones & Tammy Wynette; The Statler Brothers
Favorite Country Album	New Harvest - First Gathering – Dolly Parton	Are You Ready for the Country – Waylon Jennings; Ol' Waylon – Waylon Jennings
Favorite Country Song	"Lucille" – Kenny Rogers	"Southern Nights" – Glen Campbell "She's Got You" – Loretta Lynn
Merit
Ella Fitzgerald
