= American Music Awards of 1975 =

US television program

2nd Annual American Music Awards
- Date: February 18, 1975
- Venue: Santa Monica Civic Auditorium, Santa Monica, California
- Country: United States

Highlights
- Most awards: Gladys Knight & the Pips; Olivia Newton-John (4 each)
- Most nominations: Charlie Rich (6)

Television/radio coverage
- Network: ABC
- Runtime: 120 min.
- Produced by: Dick Clark Productions

The second Annual American Music Awards were held on February 18, 1975. Diana Ross and Berry Gordy Jr. were in Rome filming "Mahogany" and a video of Merit Award was played. Diana presented the award to Mr. Gordy Jr. while Mr. Gordy Sr. looked on between them from his wheelchair. Michael Jackson accepted the Favorite Soul / R&B Artist Award in Ms. Ross' absence.

Also not in attendance were Gladys Knight and the Pips who won 4 awards, 3 by Los Angeles Mayor Tom Bradley and the first, inadvertently by show producer Dick Clark who had sent the Mayor off mistakingly.

== Winners and nominees ==
| Subcategory | Winner | Nominees | Presenter |
Pop/Rock Category
| Favorite Pop/Rock Male Artist | John Denver | Charlie Rich; Elton John | Olivia Newton-John & Charley Pride |
| Favorite Pop/Rock Female Artist | Olivia Newton-John | Barbra Streisand; Helen Reddy | Mac Davis & Lily Tomlin |
| Favorite Pop/Rock Band/Duo/Group | Gladys Knight & the Pips | Bachman–Turner Overdrive; Wings | Donny Osmond & Marie Osmond |
| Favorite Pop/Rock Album | Charlie Rich, Behind Closed Doors | Elton John, Goodbye Yellow Brick Road; John Denver, John Denver's Greatest Hits | The Carpenters |
| Favorite Pop/Rock Song | Olivia Newton-John, "I Honestly Love You" | Barbra Streisand, "The Way We Were"; Terry Jacks, "Seasons in the Sun" | Connie Stevens & Ray Stevens |
Soul/R&B Category
| Favorite Soul/R&B Male Artist | Stevie Wonder | Barry White; James Brown | The Pointer Sisters |
| Favorite Soul/R&B Female Artist | Diana Ross | Aretha Franklin; Roberta Flack | Al Green & Pat Boone |
| Favorite Soul/R&B Band/Duo/Group | Gladys Knight & the Pips | The O'Jays; The Stylistics | Janet Jackson & Michael Jackson |
| Favorite Soul/R&B Album | Gladys Knight & the Pips, Imagination | Marvin Gaye, Let's Get It On; Stevie Wonder, Innervisions | Billy Preston & Minnie Ripperton |
| Favorite Soul/R&B Song | Gladys Knight & the Pips, "Midnight Train to Georgia" | Gladys Knight & the Pips, "You're the Best Thing That Ever Happened to Me"; Roberta Flack, "Feel Like Makin' Love" | Jimmie "JJ" Walker & Paul Williams |
Country Category
| Favorite Country Male Artist | Charlie Rich | Charley Pride; Roy Clark | Diana Trask & Ray Charles |
| Favorite Country Female Artist | Olivia Newton-John | Loretta Lynn; Marie Osmond | Merle Haggard & Johnny Mathis |
| Favorite Country Band/Duo/Group | Conway Twitty & Loretta Lynn | George Jones & Tammy Wynette; The Statler Brothers | Jim Stafford & Sally Kellerman |
| Favorite Country Album | Olivia Newton-John, Let Me Be There | Charlie Rich, Behind Closed Doors; Charlie Rich, A Very Special Love Song | Sandy Duncan & Clifton Davis |
| Favorite Country Song | Charlie Rich, "The Most Beautiful Girl" | Charley Pride, "Mississippi Cotton Picking Delta Town"; Merle Haggard, "If We Make It Through December" | Conway Twitty & Loretta Lynn |
Merit
| Berry Gordy, Jr. | | | Diana Ross |
