= American Music Award for Best Female Pop Artist =

American Music Awards for Best Female Pop Artist
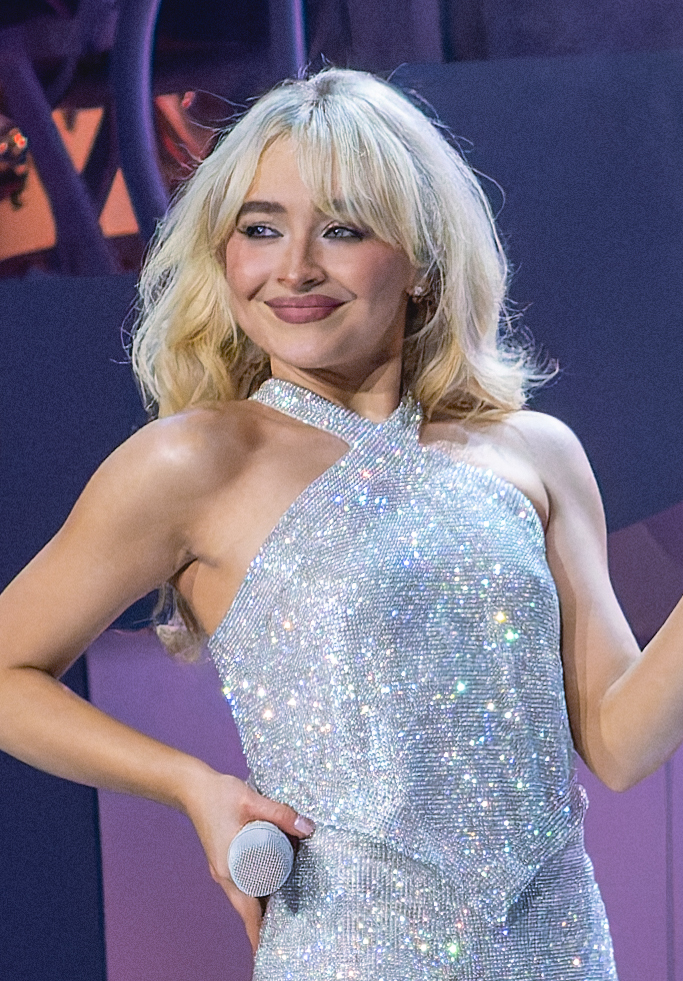
- Sabrina Carpenter is the most recent recipient
- Country: United States
- Presented by: American Music Awards
- First award: 1974
- Currently held by: Sabrina Carpenter

Highlights
- Most wins: Taylor Swift (7)
- Most nominations: Mariah Carey; Taylor Swift; (10 each)
- Website: theamas.com

The American Music Awards for Best Female Pop Artist has been awarded since 1974. Years reflect the year in which the awards were presented, for works released in the previous year (until 2003 onward when awards were handed out on November of the same year). The all-time winner in this category is Taylor Swift with seven wins. Mariah Carey and Taylor Swift are the most nominated female artist with 10 nominations each. The award was previous known as Favorite Pop/Rock Female Artist until the 2026 ceremony, where the award was renamed to Best Female Pop Artist.

== Winners and nominees ==
=== 1970s ===
Year	Artist	Ref
1974 (1st)
1974 (1st)	Helen Reddy	
1974 (1st)	Roberta Flack	
1974 (1st)	Diana Ross	
1975 (2nd)
1975 (2nd)	Olivia Newton-John	
1975 (2nd)	Helen Reddy	
1975 (2nd)	Barbra Streisand	
1976 (3rd)
1976 (3rd)	Olivia Newton-John	
1976 (3rd)	Helen Reddy	
1976 (3rd)	Linda Ronstadt	
1977 (4th)
1977 (4th)	Olivia Newton-John	
1977 (4th)	Helen Reddy	
1977 (4th)	Linda Ronstadt	
1978 (5th)
1978 (5th)	Linda Ronstadt	
1978 (5th)	Rita Coolidge	
1978 (5th)	Barbra Streisand	
1979 (6th)
1979 (6th)	Linda Ronstadt	
1979 (6th)	Barbra Streisand	
1979 (6th)	Donna Summer	

=== 1980s ===
Year	Artist	Ref
1980 (7th)
1980 (7th)	Donna Summer	
1980 (7th)	Olivia Newton-John	
1980 (7th)	Barbra Streisand	
1981 (8th)
1981 (8th)	Barbra Streisand	
1981 (8th)	Olivia Newton-John	
1981 (8th)	Linda Ronstadt	
1982 (9th)
1982 (9th)	Pat Benatar	
1982 (9th)	Sheena Easton	
1982 (9th)	Juice Newton	
1982 (9th)	Dolly Parton	
1983 (10th)
1983 (10th)	Olivia Newton-John	
1983 (10th)	Stevie Nicks	
1983 (10th)	Diana Ross	
1984 (11th)
1984 (11th)	Pat Benatar	
1984 (11th)	Stevie Nicks	
1984 (11th)	Donna Summer	
1984 (11th)	Bonnie Tyler	
1985 (12th)
1985 (12th)	Cyndi Lauper	
1985 (12th)	Madonna	
1985 (12th)	Linda Ronstadt	
1986 (13th)
1986 (13th)	Tina Turner	
1986 (13th)	Whitney Houston	
1986 (13th)	Madonna	
1987 (14th)
1987 (14th)	Whitney Houston	
1987 (14th)	Janet Jackson	
1987 (14th)	Tina Turner	
1987 (14th)	Madonna	
1988 (15th)
1988 (15th)	Whitney Houston	
1988 (15th)	Janet Jackson	
1988 (15th)	Madonna	
1989 (16th)
1989 (16th)	Whitney Houston	
1989 (16th)	Tracy Chapman	
1989 (16th)	Debbie Gibson	

=== 1990s ===
Year	Artist	Ref
1990 (17th)
1990 (17th)	Paula Abdul	
1990 (17th)	Anita Baker	
1990 (17th)	Madonna	
1991 (18th)
1991 (18th)	Janet Jackson	
1991 (18th)	Mariah Carey	
1991 (18th)	Madonna	
1991 (18th)	Sinéad O'Connor	
1992 (19th)
1992 (19th)	Paula Abdul	
1992 (19th)	Mariah Carey	
1992 (19th)	Whitney Houston	
1993 (20th)
1993 (20th)	Mariah Carey	
1993 (20th)	Amy Grant	
1993 (20th)	Bonnie Raitt	
1993 (20th)	Vanessa Williams	
1994 (21st)
1994 (21st)	Whitney Houston	
1994 (21st)	Mariah Carey	
1994 (21st)	Gloria Estefan	
1994 (21st)	Janet Jackson	
1995 (22nd)
1995 (22nd)	Mariah Carey	
1995 (22nd)	Janet Jackson	
1995 (22nd)	Bonnie Raitt	
1996 (23rd)
1996 (23rd)	Mariah Carey	
1996 (23rd)	Melissa Etheridge	
1996 (23rd)	Alanis Morissette	
1997 (24th)
1997 (24th)	Alanis Morissette	
1997 (24th)	Mariah Carey	
1997 (24th)	Celine Dion	
1998 (25th)
1998 (25th)	Celine Dion	
1998 (25th)	Toni Braxton	
1998 (25th)	Jewel	
1999 (26th)
1999 (26th)	Celine Dion	
1999 (26th)	Brandy	
1999 (26th)	Shania Twain	

=== 2000s ===
Year	Artist	Ref
2000 (27th)
2000 (27th)	Shania Twain	
2000 (27th)	Whitney Houston	
2000 (27th)	Britney Spears	
2001 (28th)
2001 (28th)	Faith Hill	
2001 (28th)	Christina Aguilera	
2001 (28th)	Celine Dion	
2001 (28th)	Britney Spears	
2002 (29th)
2002 (29th)	Janet Jackson	
2002 (29th)	Alicia Keys	
2002 (29th)	Jennifer Lopez	
2003 (30th)
2003 (30th)	Sheryl Crow	
2003 (30th)	Celine Dion	
2003 (30th)	Pink	
2003 (31st)
2003 (31st)	Jennifer Lopez	
2003 (31st)	Celine Dion	
2003 (31st)	Avril Lavigne	
2004 (32nd)
2004 (32nd)	Sheryl Crow	
2004 (32nd)	Avril Lavigne	
2004 (32nd)	Jessica Simpson	
2005 (33rd)
2005 (33rd)	Gwen Stefani	
2005 (33rd)	Mariah Carey	
2005 (33rd)	Kelly Clarkson	
2006 (34th)
2006 (34th)	Kelly Clarkson	
2006 (34th)	Mariah Carey	
2006 (34th)	Nelly Furtado	
2007 (35th)
2007 (35th)	Fergie	
2007 (35th)	Beyoncé	
2007 (35th)	Avril Lavigne	
2008 (36th)
2008 (36th)	Rihanna	
2008 (36th)	Mariah Carey	
2008 (36th)	Alicia Keys	
2009 (37th)
2009 (37th)	Taylor Swift	
2009 (37th)	Beyoncé	
2009 (37th)	Lady Gaga	

=== 2010s ===
Year	Artist	Ref
2010 (38th)	Lady Gaga	
2010 (38th)	Kesha	
2010 (38th)	Katy Perry	
2011 (39th)
2011 (39th)	Adele	
2011 (39th)	Lady Gaga	
2011 (39th)	Katy Perry	
2012 (40th)
2012 (40th)	Katy Perry	
2012 (40th)	Kelly Clarkson	
2012 (40th)	Nicki Minaj	
2012 (40th)	Rihanna	
2013 (41st)
2013 (41st)	Taylor Swift	
2013 (41st)	Pink	
2013 (41st)	Rihanna	
2014 (42nd)
2014 (42nd)	Katy Perry	
2014 (42nd)	Iggy Azalea	
2014 (42nd)	Lorde	
2015 (43rd)
2015 (43rd)	Ariana Grande	
2015 (43rd)	Taylor Swift	
2015 (43rd)	Meghan Trainor	
2016 (44th)
2016 (44th)	Selena Gomez	
2016 (44th)	Adele	
2016 (44th)	Rihanna	
2017 (45th)
2017 (45th)	Lady Gaga	
2017 (45th)	Alessia Cara	
2017 (45th)	Rihanna	
2018 (46th)	Taylor Swift	
2018 (46th)	Camila Cabello	
2018 (46th)	Cardi B	
2019 (47th)	Taylor Swift	
2019 (47th)	Ariana Grande	
2019 (47th)	Billie Eilish	

=== 2020s ===
Year	Artist	Ref
2020 (48th)	Taylor Swift	
2020 (48th)	Dua Lipa	
2020 (48th)	Lady Gaga	
2021 (49th)
2021 (49th)	Taylor Swift	
2021 (49th)	Ariana Grande	
2021 (49th)	Doja Cat	
2021 (49th)	Dua Lipa	
2021 (49th)	Olivia Rodrigo	
2022 (50th)
2022 (50th)	Taylor Swift	
2022 (50th)	Adele	
2022 (50th)	Beyoncé	
2022 (50th)	Doja Cat	
2022 (50th)	Lizzo	
2023 – 24	—N/a	
2025 (51st)
2025 (51st)	Billie Eilish	
2025 (51st)	Sabrina Carpenter	
2025 (51st)	Lady Gaga	
2025 (51st)	Chappell Roan	
2025 (51st)	Taylor Swift	
2026 (52nd)
2026 (52nd)	Sabrina Carpenter	
2026 (52nd)	Lady Gaga	
2026 (52nd)	Olivia Dean	
2026 (52nd)	Tate McRae	
2026 (52nd)	Taylor Swift	

== Category facts ==
=== Multiple wins ===
7 wins

- Taylor Swift

4 wins

- Whitney Houston
- Olivia Newton-John

3 wins

- Mariah Carey

2 wins

- Paula Abdul
- Pat Benatar
- Sheryl Crow
- Celine Dion
- Lady Gaga
- Janet Jackson
- Katy Perry
- Linda Ronstadt

=== Multiple nominations ===
10 nominations

- Mariah Carey
- Taylor Swift

7 nominations

- Whitney Houston
- Lady Gaga

6 nominations

- Celine Dion
- Janet Jackson
- Madonna
- Olivia Newton-John
- Linda Ronstadt

5 nominations

- Rihanna
- Barbra Streisand

4 nominations

- Katy Perry
- Helen Reddy

3 nominations

- Adele
- Ariana Grande
- Avril Lavigne
- Beyoncé
- Kelly Clarkson

2 nominations

- Britney Spears
- Sabrina Carpenter
- Doja Cat
- Billie Eilish
- Dua Lipa
- Pink

== See also ==
- List of music awards honoring women
