= American Music Awards of 1976 =

US television program

3rd Annual American Music Awards
- Date: January 31, 1976
- Country: United States

Highlights
- Most awards: John Denver; Olivia Newton-John (3 each)
- Most nominations: Olivia Newton-John (4)

Television/radio coverage
- Network: ABC
- Runtime: 120 min.
- Produced by: Dick Clark Productions

The third Annual American Music Awards were held on January 31, 1976.

== Winners and nominees of 3rd Annual American Music Awards ==
Pop/Rock Category
Category	Winner	Nominated
Favorite Pop/Rock Male Artist	John Denver	Elton John; Neil Sedaka
Favorite Pop/Rock Female Artist	Olivia Newton-John	Helen Reddy; Linda Ronstadt
Favorite Pop/Rock Band/Duo/Group	Tony Orlando and Dawn	Eagles; Earth, Wind & Fire
Favorite Pop/Rock Album	Olivia Newton-John, Have You Never Been Mellow	Eagles, One of These Nights; Elton John, Greatest Hits
Favorite Pop/Rock Song	Glen Campbell, "Rhinestone Cowboy"	Captain & Tennille, "Love Will Keep Us Together"; Elton John, "Philadelphia Freedom"
Soul/R&B Category
Category	Winner	Nominated
Favorite Soul/R&B Male Artist	Barry White	James Brown; Smokey Robinson
Favorite Soul/R&B Female Artist	Aretha Franklin	Gwen McCrae; Minnie Riperton
Favorite Soul/R&B Band/Duo/Group	Gladys Knight & the Pips	Earth, Wind & Fire; KC and the Sunshine Band
Favorite Soul/R&B Album	The Temptations, A Song for You	Earth, Wind & Fire, That's the Way of the World; Ohio Players, Five
Favorite Soul/R&B Song	KC and the Sunshine Band, "Get Down Tonight"	Gwen McCrae, "Rockin' Chair"; Love Unlimited, "I Belong to You"
Country Category
Category	Winner	Nominated
Favorite Country Male Artist	John Denver	Charlie Rich; Merle Haggard
Favorite Country Female Artist	Olivia Newton-John	Linda Ronstadt; Loretta Lynn
Favorite Country Band/Duo/Group	Donny Osmond & Marie Osmond	Conway Twitty & Loretta Lynn; The Statler Brothers
Favorite Country Album	John Denver, Back Home Again	Freddy Fender, Before the Next Teardrop Falls; Olivia Newton-John, Have You Never Been Mellow
Favorite Country Song	Glen Campbell, "Rhinestone Cowboy"	Freddy Fender, "Before the Next Teardrop Falls"; Willie Nelson, "Blue Eyes Crying in the Rain"
Merit
Irving Berlin
