= American Music Awards of 2000 =

US television program

27th Annual American Music Awards
- Date: January 17, 2000
- Location: Shrine Auditorium, Los Angeles, California
- Country: United States
- Hosted by: Norm Macdonald

Highlights
- Most awards: Garth Brooks (3)
- Most nominations: Shania Twain, Britney Spears and Whitney Houston (3 each)

Television/radio coverage
- Network: ABC
- Runtime: 180 minutes
- Produced by: Dick Clark Productions

The 27th Annual American Music Awards were held on January 17, 2000, at the Shrine Auditorium, in Los Angeles, California. The awards recognized the most popular artists and albums from the year 1999. With three wins, including the fan-voted 1990s Artist of the Decade Award, Garth Brooks was the most awarded artist of the night. In competitive categories, he, Lauryn Hill, and Shania Twain all won two awards each, making them the most awarded artists in standard categories.

== Performances ==
| Artist(s) | Song(s) |
|---|---|
| Mariah Carey; Joe; Nas | "Thank God I Found You" |
| *NSYNC | "Bye Bye Bye" |
| Brooks & Dunn | "Hurt Train" |
| Christina Aguilera | "I Turn to You" "What a Girl Wants" |
| Eurythmics | "I Saved the World Today" "Here Comes the Rain Again" |
| Enrique Iglesias | "Rhythm Divine" |
| Dr. Dre; Eminem | "Forgot About Dre" |
| Beck | "Mixed Bizness" |
| Savage Garden | "I Knew I Loved You" |
| Eve; Faith Evans | "Love Is Blind" |
| Lonestar | "Amazed" |
| Creed | "Higher" |
| Brian McKnight | "Back at One" |
| Lenny Kravitz | "American Woman" |
| TRU as The Real Untouchable | Hoody Hoo (Clean) |

== Presenters ==
- Melissa Etheridge and Kelsey Grammer – presented Favourite Pop/Rock Album
- SHeDAISY – presented Favourite Country Album
- Deborah Cox and Tommy Lee – presented Favourite Rap/Hip-Hop Artist
- Thomas Gibson and Carmen Electra – presented Favourite Pop/Rock New Artist
- Donny Osmond and Marie Osmond – announced the first competition for Artist of the Decade
- LFO – introduced Christina Aguilera
- Sara Evans and John Michael Montgomery – presented Favourite Country Band, Duo or Group
- Kellie Martin and Ty Herndon – presented Favourite Country New Artist
- DMX and Melanie C – presented Favourite Soul/R&B Band, Duo or Group
- Dru Hill – introduced Dr. Dre and Eminem
- Andy Garcia – presented the Merit Award to Gloria Estefan
- Montgomery Gentry and Trace Adkins – presented Favourite Country Female Artist
- Melissa Joan Hart – introduced Beck
- Tal Bachman and Britney Spears – presented Favourite Pop/Rock Band, Duo or Group
- Warren G and Kenny G – presented Favourite Pop/Rock Female Artist
- Lou Bega – introduced Eve
- Queen Latifah and Christopher Reid – presented Favourite Soul/R&B New Artist
- Olivia Newton-John – presented the American Music Award of Achievement to Mariah Carey
- Ricky Schroder and Amy Grant – presented Favourite Latin Music Artist
- Diana Ross – introduced a tribute to activist Martin Luther King Jr.
- Norm Macdonald (host) – presented the 1990s Artist of the Decade Award to Garth Brooks
- Jane Leeves and Bill Goldberg – presented Favourite Soul/R&B Album
- Tyrese Gibson, Julio Iglesias Jr. and Jessica Simpson – presented Favourite Soul/R&B Male Artist
- Christina Applegate – introduced Lenny Kravitz
- Ginuwine and Guy – presented Favourite Soul/R&B Female Artist
- Bill Maher and Caroline Rhea – presented Favourite Pop/Rock Male Artist
- Reba McEntire – presented Favourite Country Male Artist

== Winners and nominees ==
| Subcategory | Winner | Nominees |
|---|---|---|
Pop/Rock Category
| Favorite Pop/Rock Male Artist | Will Smith | Lenny Kravitz; Ricky Martin |
| Favorite Pop/Rock Female Artist | Shania Twain | Whitney Houston; Britney Spears |
| Favorite Pop/Rock Band/Duo/Group | Backstreet Boys | *NSYNC; Santana |
| Favorite Pop/Rock Album | Supernatural - Santana | Millennium - Backstreet Boys...Baby One More Time - Britney Spears |
| Favorite Pop/Rock New Artist | Britney Spears | Kid Rock; Jennifer Lopez |
Soul/R&B Category
| Favorite Soul/R&B Male Artist | R. Kelly | Busta Rhymes; Ginuwine |
| Favorite Soul/R&B Female Artist | Lauryn Hill | Brandy; Whitney Houston |
| Favorite Soul/R&B Band/Duo/Group | TLC | Dru Hill; K-Ci & JoJo |
| Favorite Soul/R&B Album | The Miseducation of Lauryn Hill - Lauryn Hill | My Love Is Your Love - Whitney Houston; FanMail - TLC |
| Favorite Soul/R&B New Artist | Tyrese | Eve; 702 |
Country Category
| Favorite Country Male Artist | Garth Brooks | Tim McGraw; George Strait |
| Favorite Country Female Artist | Shania Twain | Faith Hill; Martina McBride |
| Favorite Country Band/Duo/Group | Brooks & Dunn | Diamond Rio; Dixie Chicks |
| Favorite Country Album | Double Live - Garth Brooks | Fly - Dixie Chicks; Always Never the Same - George Strait |
| Favorite Country New Artist | Montgomery Gentry | Sara Evans; SheDaisy |
Adult Contemporary Category
| Favorite Adult Contemporary Artist | Phil Collins | Cher; Shania Twain |
Alternative Category
| Favorite Alternative Artist | Red Hot Chili Peppers | Kid Rock; Limp Bizkit |
Rap/Hip-Hop Category
| Favorite Rap/Hip-Hop Artist | DMX | Jay-Z; Juvenile |
Latin Category
| Favorite Latin Artist | Ricky Martin | Enrique Iglesias; Jennifer Lopez |
Soundtrack Category
| Favorite Soundtrack | Wild Wild West | Austin Powers: The Spy Who Shagged Me; Runaway Bride |
Artist of the Decade Category (Fan voted)
| 1950s Decade Award | Elvis Presley | |
| 1960s Decade Award | The Beatles | |
| 1970s Decade Award | Stevie Wonder | |
| 1980s Decade Award | Michael Jackson | |
| 1990s Decade Award | Garth Brooks | |
Merit
Gloria Estefan
Achievement Award
Mariah Carey
