= American Music Awards of 2010 =

2010 ceremony of the American Music Awards

38th Annual American Music Awards
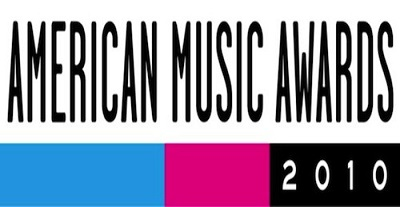
- American Music Awards of 2010 logo
- Date: November 21, 2010
- Location: Nokia Theatre L.A. Live, Los Angeles, California
- Country: United States

Highlights
- Most awards: Justin Bieber (4)
- Most nominations: Eminem (5)
- Website: American Music Awards

Television/radio coverage
- Network: ABC (November 21, 2010); RCTI (November 22, 2010)
- Runtime: 127 minutes
- Viewership: 11.6 million
- Produced by: Dick Clark Productions

The 38th Annual American Music Awards were held November 21, 2010, at the Nokia Theatre L.A. Live in Los Angeles, California. The awards recognized the most popular artists and albums from 2010's music list. Nominees were announced on October 12, 2010 by Demi Lovato and Taio Cruz. Justin Bieber was nominated for, and won, four awards, including Artist of the Year. Usher and Eminem both won two awards; the former was nominated for three and the latter, five.

== Performers ==
| Artist(s) | Song(s) | Ref |
|---|---|---|
| Rihanna | "Love the Way You Lie (Part II)" "What's My Name?" "Only Girl (In the World)" | |
| Enrique Iglesias; Pitbull | "Tonight (I'm Lovin' You)" "I Like It" | |
| Miley Cyrus | "Forgiveness and Love" | |
| Diddy - Dirty Money | "Coming Home" | |
| Kid Rock | "Times Like These" | |
| The Black Eyed Peas | "The Time (Dirty Bit)" | |
| Katy Perry | "Firework" | |
| Justin Bieber | "Pray" | |
| Bon Jovi | "What Do You Got?" "You Give Love a Bad Name" "It's My Life" | |
| P!nk | "Raise Your Glass" | |
| Ne-Yo | "Champagne Life" "One in a Million" "Telekinesis" "Beautiful Monster" | |
| Taylor Swift | "Back to December" "Apologize" | |
| Christina Aguilera | "Express" | |
| Usher; Swedish House Mafia | "DJ Got Us Fallin' in Love" "Miami 2 Ibiza" "One" | |
| Train | "Marry Me" "Hey, Soul Sister" | |
| Kesha | "Take It Off" "We R Who We R" | |
| Carlos Santana; Gavin Rossdale | "Get It On" "Take Me to the River" | |
| Backstreet Boys; New Kids on the Block | "Everybody (Backstreet's Back)" "Hangin' Tough" "I Want It That Way" "Step by Step" "You Got It (The Right Stuff)" "Larger than Life" | |

== Presenters ==
- Heidi Klum — welcomed the audience & presented Favorite Soul/R&B Album
- Jenny McCarthy & John Legend — presented Favorite Pop/Rock Duo/Band/Group
- Eric Stonestreet & Rico Rodriguez II — introduced Enrique Iglesias & Pitbull
- Jessica Alba -- presented Favorite Country Female Artist
- Samuel L. Jackson — introduced Kid Rock
- Christina Milian & Johnny Weir — presented Favorite Latin Artist
- Taio Cruz, Nicki Minaj & Trey Songz — presented Favorite Soul/R&B Female Artist
- Willow Smith — introduced Justin Bieber
- Mandy Moore & Sheryl Crow -- presented Favorite Country Male Artist
- Natasha Bedingfield — presented T-Mobile Breakthrough Artist
- Kelly Osbourne — introduced P!NK
- Julianne Hough & Keri Hilson — presented Favorite Pop/Rock Male Artist
- Nathan Fillion & Stana Katic — presented Favorite Country Band/Duo/Group
- Mike Posner & Avril Lavigne -- presented Favorite Alternative/Rock Artist
- The Band Perry — presented Favorite Adult Contemporary Artist
- Michael Chiklis & Julie Benz — introduced Kesha
- Lady Antebellum — presented Favorite Soul/R&B Male Artist
- Ryan Seacrest — presented Artist of the Year

== Winners and nominees ==
| Artist of the Year | T-Mobile Breakthrough Artist |
|---|---|
| Justin Bieber; Eminem; Kesha; Lady Gaga; Katy Perry | Justin Bieber; B.o.B; Taio Cruz; Jason Derulo; Kesha |
| Favorite Pop/Rock Male Artist | Favorite Pop/Rock Female Artist |
| Justin Bieber; Eminem; Usher | Lady Gaga; Kesha; Katy Perry |
| Favorite Pop/Rock Band/Duo/Group | Favorite Pop/Rock Album |
| The Black Eyed Peas; Lady Antebellum; Train | My World 2.0 – Justin Bieber; Recovery – Eminem; Teenage Dream – Katy Perry |
| Favorite Country Male Artist | Favorite Country Female Artist |
| Brad Paisley; Jason Aldean; Luke Bryan | Taylor Swift; Miranda Lambert; Carrie Underwood |
| Favorite Country Band/Duo/Group | Favorite Country Album |
| Lady Antebellum; Rascal Flatts; Zac Brown Band | Play On – Carrie Underwood; Need You Now – Lady Antebellum; Wide Open – Jason Aldean |
| Favorite Rap/Hip-Hop Artist | Favorite Rap/Hip-Hop Album |
| Eminem; B.o.B; Drake | Recovery – Eminem; B.o.B Presents: The Adventures of Bobby Ray – B.o.B; Thank Me Later – Drake |
| Favorite Soul/R&B Male Artist | Favorite Soul/R&B Female Artist |
| Usher; Chris Brown; Trey Songz | Rihanna; Alicia Keys; Sade |
| Favorite Soul/R&B Album | Favorite Soundtrack |
| Raymond v. Raymond – Usher; The Element of Freedom – Alicia Keys; Soldier of Love – Sade | Glee: The Music, Volume 3 Showstoppers; Iron Man 2; The Twilight Saga: Eclipse |
| Favorite Alternative Rock Artist | Favorite Adult Contemporary Artist |
| Muse; Phoenix; Vampire Weekend | Michael Bublé; Lady Antebellum; Train |
| Favorite Latin Artist | Favorite Contemporary Inspirational Artist |
| Shakira; Daddy Yankee; Enrique Iglesias | MercyMe; Casting Crowns; TobyMac |

== Ratings ==
The ceremony was watched by 11.6 million viewers and received a 4.3 preliminary rating in the 18–49 demographic. At the time, It marked the lowest ratings ever for the ceremony, with competition coming from NBC Sunday Night Football.
