= American Music Awards of 2011 =

2011 ceremony of the American Music Awards

39th Annual American Music Awards
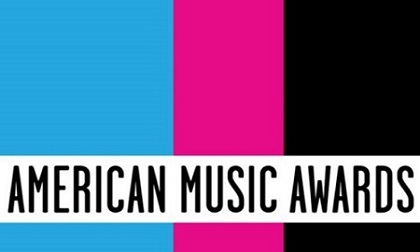
- American Music Awards of 2011 logo
- Date: November 20, 2011
- Location: Nokia Theatre L.A. Live, Los Angeles, California
- Country: United States

Highlights
- Most awards: Adele and Taylor Swift (3 each)
- Most nominations: Adele (4)
- Website: ABC-American Music Awards

Television/radio coverage
- Network: ABC; Global TV
- Runtime: 129 minutes
- Viewership: 12 million
- Produced by: Dick Clark Productions

The 39th Annual American Music Awards was held on November 20, 2011, at the Nokia Theatre L.A. Live in Los Angeles. The awards recognized the most popular artists and albums from the year 2011. Nominees were announced on October 11, 2011. The awards ceremony was host-free and was broadcast on ABC. Taylor Swift and Adele were the big winners of the night picking up three awards in total.

== Performers ==
Artist(s)	Song(s)	Ref
Pre-show		
Hot Chelle Rae	"I Like It Like That" "Tonight Tonight"	
Main show
David Guetta; Nicki Minaj	"Sweat" "Turn Me On" "Super Bass"	
Justin Bieber	"Mistletoe"	
The Band Perry	"If I Die Young"	
Chris Brown	"All Back" "Say It With Me"	
Kelly Clarkson	"Mr. Know It All"	
Enrique Iglesias; Ludacris	"I Like How It Feels" "Tonight (I'm Lovin' You)"	
Jennifer Lopez; Pitbull	"Until It Beats No More" (Intro) "Papi" "On the Floor"	
OneRepublic	"Good Life"	
Pitbull; Marc Anthony; Lil Jon	"I Know You Want Me" "Give Me Everything" "Rain Over Me"	
Katy Perry	"The One That Got Away"	
Mary J. Blige	"Mr. Wrong"	
Maroon 5 Christina Aguilera	"Moves Like Jagger"	
Gym Class Heroes; Adam Levine	"Stereo Hearts"	
Drake	"Headlines"	
Daughtry	"Crawling Back to You"	
will.i.am Jennifer Lopez	"T.H.E. (The Hardest Ever)"	
LMFAO; Lauren Bennett; GoonRock	"Party Rock Anthem" "Sexy and I Know It" "Sorry for Party Rocking"	

== Presenters ==
- Queen Latifah - presented Favorite Pop/Rock Band/Duo/Group
- Hot Chelle Rae - presented Favorite Country Female Artist
- Sean Kingston - introduced Justin Bieber
- 50 Cent - introduced Chris Brown
- Jennifer Hudson - presented Favorite Rap/Hip-Hop Artist
- Jane Levy & Cheryl Hines - introduced Kelly Clarkson
- Selena Gomez & Taio Cruz - presented Favorite Soul/R&B Album
- Vanessa Marano & Katie Leclerc - introduced Enrique Iglesias & Ludacris
- Nickelback - presented Favorite Country Band/Duo/Group
- Adam Lambert - introduced OneRepublic
- Taylor Swift - presented Favorite Rap/Hip-Hop Album
- Benjamin Bratt - introduced Pitbull, Marc Anthony & Lil Jon
- Heidi Klum - introduced and presented the Special Achievement Award to Katy Perry
- Joe Jonas - presented the Sprint Best New Artist of the Year
- Jennifer Morrison & Matthew Morrison - presented Favorite Latin Music Artist
- Alanis Morissette - introduced Mary J Blige
- Robin Thicke & Ellie Goulding - presented Favorite Soul/R&B Female Artist
- Bruno Mars - introduced Maroon 5 & Christina Aguilera
- John Legend - introduced Drake
- Julie Bowen & Sarah Hyland - presented Favorite Pop/Rock Male Artist
- Gavin DeGraw - introduced Daughtry
- Katherine Heigl & Josh Kelley - presented Favorite Country Album
- Jenny McCarthy - introduced will.i.am & Jennifer Lopez & presented Favorite Pop/Rock Album
- Lionel Richie & Vanessa Lachey - presented Artist of the Year & introduced LMFAO, Lauren Bennett & GoonRock

== Winners and nominees ==
Artist of the Year	Sprint Best New Artist of the Year
Taylor Swift; Adele; Lady Gaga; Katy Perry; Lil Wayne	Hot Chelle Rae; The Band Perry; Miguel; Wiz Khalifa
Favorite Pop/Rock Male Artist	Favorite Pop/Rock Female Artist
Bruno Mars; Justin Bieber; Pitbull	Adele; Lady Gaga; Katy Perry
Favorite Pop/Rock Band/Duo/Group	Favorite Pop/Rock Album
Maroon 5; LMFAO; OneRepublic	21 – Adele; Loud – Rihanna; Born This Way – Lady Gaga
Favorite Country Male Artist	Favorite Country Female Artist
Blake Shelton; Jason Aldean; Brad Paisley	Taylor Swift; Sara Evans; Miranda Lambert
Favorite Country Band/Duo/Group	Favorite Country Album
Lady Antebellum; Zac Brown Band; The Band Perry	Speak Now – Taylor Swift; My Kinda Party – Jason Aldean; The Band Perry – The Band Perry
Favorite Rap/Hip-Hop Artist	Favorite Rap/Hip-Hop Album
Nicki Minaj; Lil Wayne; Kanye West	Pink Friday – Nicki Minaj; Tha Carter IV – Lil Wayne; Watch the Throne – Jay-Z and Kanye West
Favorite Soul/R&B Male Artist	Favorite Soul/R&B Female Artist
Usher; Chris Brown; Trey Songz	Beyoncé; Rihanna; Kelly Rowland
Favorite Soul/R&B Album	Favorite Alternative Artist
Loud – Rihanna; F.A.M.E. – Chris Brown; 4 – Beyoncé	Foo Fighters; The Black Keys; Mumford & Sons
Favorite Adult Contemporary Artist	Favorite Latin Artist
Adele; Bruno Mars; Katy Perry	Jennifer Lopez; Enrique Iglesias; Pitbull
Favorite Contemporary Inspirational Artist	Special Award
Casting Crowns; TobyMac; Third Day	Katy Perry
