= American Music Awards of 1981 =

US television program

8th Annual American Music Awards
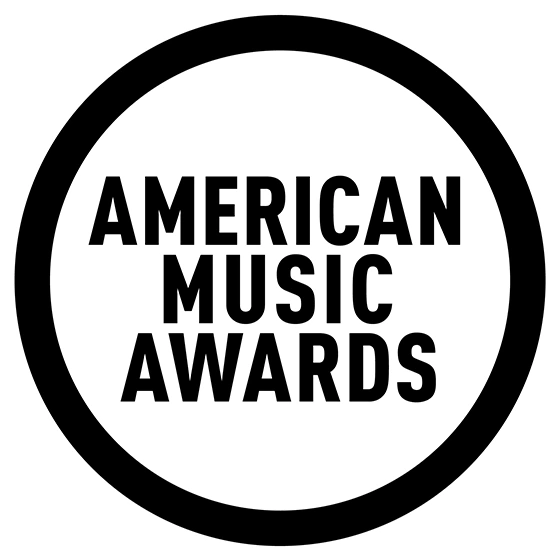
- Logo
- Date: January 30, 1981
- Venue: ABC Studios, Los Angeles, California
- Country: United States
- Hosted by: Mac Davis; Crystal Gayle; Teddy Pendergrass

Highlights
- Most awards: Kenny Rogers (4)
- Most nominations: Kenny Rogers (6)

Television/radio coverage
- Network: ABC
- Runtime: 180 min.
- Produced by: Dick Clark Productions

The eighth Annual American Music Awards were held on January 30, 1981.

== Winners and nominees ==
| Subcategory | Winner | Nominees |
|---|---|---|
Pop/Rock Categories
| Favorite Pop/Rock Male Artist | Kenny Rogers | Billy Joel; Bob Seger |
| Favorite Pop/Rock Female Artist | Barbra Streisand | Olivia Newton-John; Linda Ronstadt |
| Favorite Pop/Rock Band/Duo/Group | Eagles | Queen; Rolling Stones |
| Favorite Pop/Rock Album | Glass Houses – Billy Joel | Off the Wall – Michael Jackson; Against the Wind – Bob Seger & The Silver Bullet Band |
| Favorite Pop/Rock Song | "Another One Bites the Dust" - Queen | "Another Brick in the Wall" - Pink Floyd "Upside Down" - Diana Ross |
Soul/R&B Categories
| Favorite Soul/R&B Male Artist | Michael Jackson | George Benson; Teddy Pendergrass |
| Favorite Soul/R&B Female Artist | Diana Ross | Chaka Khan; Stephanie Mills |
| Favorite Soul/R&B Band/Duo/Group | Earth Wind and Fire | Kool & the Gang; The O'Jays |
| Favorite Soul/R&B Album | Off the Wall – Michael Jackson | Teddy – Teddy Pendergrass; Diana – Diana Ross |
| Favorite Soul/R&B Song | "Upside Down" - Diana Ross | "Give Me the Night" - George Benson "One in a Million You" - Larry Graham |
Country Categories
| Favorite Country Male Artist | Kenny Rogers | Willie Nelson; Charley Pride |
| Favorite Country Female Artist | Barbara Mandrell | Crystal Gayle; Anne Murray |
| Favorite Country Band/Duo/Group | The Statler Brothers | Charlie Daniels Band; The Oak Ridge Boys |
| Favorite Country Album | The Gambler – Kenny Rogers | Music Man – Waylon Jennings; Ten Years of Gold – Kenny Rogers |
| Favorite Country Song | "Coward of the County" - Kenny Rogers | "If You Ever Change Your Mind" - Crystal Gayle "Don't Fall in Love with a Dreamer" - Kenny Rogers & Kim Carnes |
Merit
Chuck Berry
