= American Music Awards of 2008 =

US television program

36th Annual American Music Awards
- Date: November 23, 2008
- Location: Nokia Theatre, Los Angeles, California
- Country: United States
- Hosted by: Jimmy Kimmel

Highlights
- Most awards: Chris Brown (3)
- Most nominations: Alicia Keys (5)
- Website: ABC-American Music Awards

Television/radio coverage
- Network: ABC (November 23, 2008); RCTI (November 29, 2008)
- Runtime: 135 minutes
- Produced by: Dick Clark Productions

The 36th Annual American Music Awards were held on November 23, 2008 at the Nokia Theatre L.A. Live in Los Angeles, California. The ceremony was hosted by Jimmy Kimmel. The nominations were announced on October 11, 2008.

== Performers ==
Artist(s)	Song(s)
Christina Aguilera	"Beautiful" "Keeps Gettin’ Better" "Genie in a Bottle" "Dirrty" "Ain’t No Other Man" "Fighter"
New Kids on the Block	"Single" "You Got It (The Right Stuff)" "Please Dont Go Girl" "I’ll Be Loving You (Forever)" "Dirty Dancing"
P!nk	"Sober"
Taylor Swift	"White Horse"
Ne-Yo	"Miss Independent" "Closer"
Leona Lewis	"Better in Time"
Miley Cyrus	"Fly on the Wall"
Coldplay	"Lovers in Japan"
Mariah Carey	"I Stay in Love"
The Fray	"You Found Me"
Beyoncé	"Single Ladies (Put a Ring on It)"
Jonas Brothers	"Tonight"
The Pussycat Dolls	"I Hate This Part" "When I Grow Up"
Annie Lennox	"Why"
Natasha Bedingfield	"Soulmate" "Unwritten" "Pocketful of Sunshine"
Rihanna	"Rehab"
Kanye West	"Heartless"
Sarah McLachlan; P!nk	"Angel"
Alicia Keys; Queen Latifah; Kathleen Battle	"Superwoman"

== Presenters ==
- Jamie Foxx
- Sarah Chalke
- Akon
- Julianne Hough
- Ashley Tisdale
- David Archuleta
- Demi Lovato
- Kate Walsh
- Paris Hilton
- T-Pain
- Jordin Sparks
- Scott Weiland
- Daughtry
- Billy Ray Cyrus
- Mötley Crüe
- Terrence Howard
- Nick Lachey
- Aretha Franklin
- Steven Tyler
- Joe Perry
- Richie Sambora
- Colbie Caillat
- David Cook
- The-Dream
- Enrique Iglesias
- LL Cool J
- Jesse McCartney
- Nickelback
- Solange
- Shailene Woodley
- Lance Bass
- Justin Timberlake

== Winners and nominees ==
Artist of the Year	New Artist of the Year
Chris Brown; Coldplay; Eagles; Alicia Keys; Lil Wayne	Jonas Brothers; Colbie Caillat; Flo Rida; Paramore; The-Dream
Favorite Pop/Rock Male Artist	Favorite Pop/Rock Female Artist
Chris Brown; Kid Rock; Usher	Rihanna; Mariah Carey; Alicia Keys
Favorite Pop/Rock Band/Duo/Group	Favorite Pop/Rock Album
Daughtry; Coldplay; Eagles	As I Am - Alicia Keys; Viva la Vida or Death and All His Friends - Coldplay; Long Road Out of Eden - Eagles
Favorite Country Male Artist	Favorite Country Female Artist
Brad Paisley; Garth Brooks; Kenny Chesney	Taylor Swift; Reba McEntire; Carrie Underwood
Favorite Country Band/Duo/Group	Favorite Country Album
Rascal Flatts; Brooks & Dunn; Sugarland	Carnival Ride - Carrie Underwood; The Ultimate Hits - Garth Brooks; Still Feels Good - Rascal Flatts
Favorite Rap/Hip-Hop Artist	Favorite Rap/Hip-Hop Band, Duo or Group
Kanye West; Flo Rida; Lil Wayne	Three 6 Mafia; G-Unit; Wu-Tang Clan
Favorite Rap/Hip-Hop Album	Favorite Soul/R&B Album
Graduation – Kanye West; American Gangster – Jay-Z; Tha Carter III – Lil Wayne	As I Am – Alicia Keys; Growing Pains – Mary J. Blige; E=MC² – Mariah Carey
Favorite Soul/R&B Male Artist	Favorite Soul/R&B Female Artist
Chris Brown; J. Holiday; Usher	Rihanna; Mary J. Blige; Alicia Keys
Favorite Alternative Artist	Favorite Adult Contemporary Artist
Linkin Park; Coldplay; Foo Fighters	Jordin Sparks; Daughtry; Eagles
Favorite Soundtrack	Favorite Latin Artist
Alvin and the Chipmunks; Juno; Mamma Mia!	Enrique Iglesias; Juanes; Wisin & Yandel
Favorite Contemporary Inspirational Artist	Honorary Award
Third Day; Casting Crowns; MercyMe	Mariah Carey
Award of Merit
Annie Lennox
