= American Music Awards of 1980 =

US television program

7th Annual American Music Awards
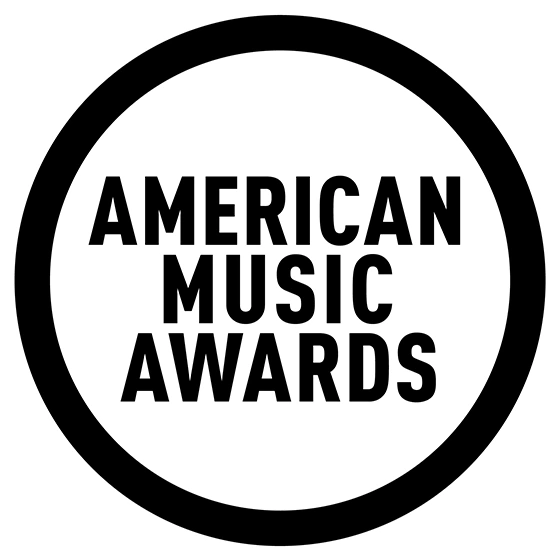
- Date: January 18, 1980
- Venue: ABC Studios, Los Angeles, California
- Country: United States

Highlights
- Most awards: Michael Jackson; Donna Summer (3 each)
- Most nominations: Donna Summer (4)

Television/radio coverage
- Network: ABC
- Runtime: 180 min.
- Produced by: Dick Clark Productions

The seventh Annual American Music Awards were held on January 18, 1980.

== Winners and nominees ==
Subcategory	Winner	Nominees
Pop/Rock Categories
Favorite Pop/Rock Male Artist	Barry Manilow	Billy Joel; Kenny Rogers
Favorite Pop/Rock Female Artist	Donna Summer	Olivia Newton-John; Barbra Streisand
Favorite Pop/Rock Band/Duo/Group	Bee Gees	Cheap Trick; Supertramp
Favorite Pop/Rock Album	Spirits Having Flown - Bee Gees	In Through The Out Door - Led Zeppelin; Bad Girls - Donna Summer
Favorite Pop/Rock Song	"Bad Girls" - Donna Summer	"My Sharona" - The Knack "Da Ya Think I'm Sexy?" - Rod Stewart
Soul/R&B Categories
Favorite Soul/R&B Male Artist	Michael Jackson	Rick James; Teddy Pendergrass
Favorite Soul/R&B Female Artist	Donna Summer	Gloria Gaynor; Stephanie Mills
Favorite Soul/R&B Band/Duo/Group	The Commodores	Chic; Earth, Wind & Fire
Favorite Soul/R&B Album	Off The Wall - Michael Jackson	Midnight Magic - The Commodores; Teddy - Teddy Pendergrass
Favorite Soul/R&B Song	"Don't Stop 'Til You Get Enough" - Michael Jackson	"Ladies Night" - Kool & The Gang "Reunited" - Peaches & Herb
Country Categories
Favorite Country Male Artist	Kenny Rogers	Waylon Jennings; Willie Nelson
Favorite Country Female Artist	Crystal Gayle	Barbara Mandrell; Dolly Parton
Favorite Country Band/Duo/Group	The Statler Brothers	The Oak Ridge Boys; Kenny Rogers & Dottie West
Favorite Country Album	The Gambler - Kenny Rogers	Miss The Mississippi - Crystal Gayle; Greatest Hits - Waylon Jennings
Favorite Country Song	"Sleeping Single in a Double Bed" - Barbara Mandrell	"Amanda" - Waylon Jennings "Suspicions" - Eddie Rabbitt
Merit
Benny Goodman
