= American Music Award for Best Male Pop Artist =

American music award

American Music Awards for Best Male Pop Artist
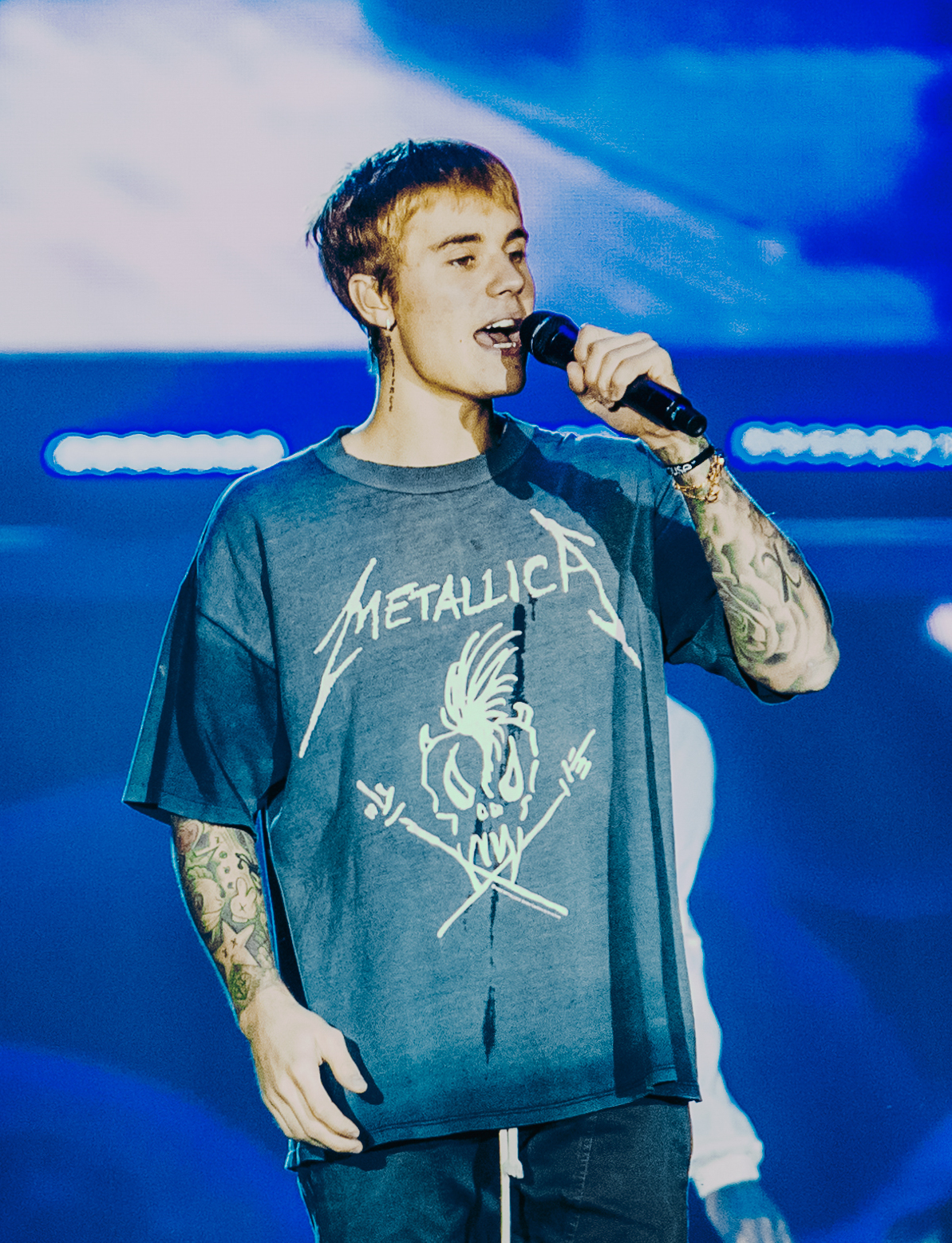
- Justin Bieber is the most recent recipient
- Country: United States
- Presented by: American Music Awards
- First award: 1974
- Currently held by: Justin Bieber

Highlights
- Most wins: Justin Bieber (5)
- Most nominations: Justin Bieber & Michael Jackson (7)
- Website: theamas.com

The American Music Award for Best Male Pop Artist has been awarded since 1974. Years reflect the year in which the awards were presented, for works released in the previous year (until 2003 onward when awards were handed out on November of the same year). Justin Bieber has the most wins in this category with five. Bieber and Michael Jackson are the most nominated male artists with 7 nominations each. Jackson is also the only singer to have won this award in three separate decades (80s, 90s and 00s). The award was previous known as Favorite Pop/Rock Male Artist until the 2026 ceremony, where the award was renamed to Best Male Pop Artist.

== Winners and nominees ==
=== 1970s ===
Year	Artist	Ref
1974 (1st)
1974 (1st)	Jim Croce	
1974 (1st)	Elton John	
1974 (1st)	Stevie Wonder	
1975 (2nd)
1975 (2nd)	John Denver	
1975 (2nd)	Elton John	
1975 (2nd)	Charlie Rich	
1976 (3rd)
1976 (3rd)	John Denver	
1976 (3rd)	Elton John	
1976 (3rd)	Neil Sedaka	
1977 (4th)
1977 (4th)	Elton John	
1977 (4th)	Peter Frampton	
1977 (4th)	Barry Manilow	
1978 (5th)
1978 (5th)	Barry Manilow	
1978 (5th)	Peter Frampton	
1978 (5th)	Stevie Wonder	
1979 (6th)
1979 (6th)	Barry Manilow	
1979 (6th)	Andy Gibb	
1979 (6th)	Billy Joel	

=== 1980s ===
Year	Artist	Ref
1980 (7th)
1980 (7th)	Barry Manilow	
1980 (7th)	Billy Joel	
1980 (7th)	Kenny Rogers	
1981 (8th)
1981 (8th)	Kenny Rogers	
1981 (8th)	Billy Joel	
1981 (8th)	Bob Seger	
1982 (9th)
1982 (9th)	Kenny Rogers	
1982 (9th)	John Lennon	
1982 (9th)	Eddie Rabbitt	
1982 (9th)	Rick Springfield	
1983 (10th)
1983 (10th)	John Mellencamp	
1983 (10th)	Rick Springfield	
1983 (10th)	Paul McCartney	
1984 (11th)
1984 (11th)	Michael Jackson	
1984 (11th)	David Bowie	
1984 (11th)	Billy Joel	
1984 (11th)	Lionel Richie	
1985 (12th)
1985 (12th)	Lionel Richie	
1985 (12th)	Prince	
1985 (12th)	Bruce Springsteen	
1986 (13th)
1986 (13th)	Bruce Springsteen	
1986 (13th)	Phil Collins	
1986 (13th)	Prince	
1987 (14th)
1987 (14th)	Lionel Richie	
1987 (14th)	Peter Gabriel	
1987 (14th)	Robert Palmer	
1987 (14th)	David Lee Roth	
1988 (15th)
1988 (15th)	Paul Simon	
1988 (15th)	Michael Jackson	
1988 (15th)	George Michael	
1989 (16th)
1989 (16th)	George Michael	
1989 (16th)	Michael Jackson	
1989 (16th)	Steve Winwood	

=== 1990s ===
Year	Artist	Ref
1990 (17th)
1990 (17th)	Bobby Brown	
1990 (17th)	Richard Marx	
1990 (17th)	John Mellencamp	
1991 (18th)
1991 (18th)	Phil Collins	
1991 (18th)	Michael Bolton	
1991 (18th)	MC Hammer	
1992 (19th)
1992 (19th)	Michael Bolton	
1992 (19th)	Bryan Adams	
1992 (19th)	Rod Stewart	
1993 (20th)
1993 (20th)	Michael Bolton	
1993 (20th)	Bryan Adams	
1993 (20th)	Eric Clapton	
1993 (20th)	Michael Jackson	
1994 (21st)
1994 (21st)	Eric Clapton	
1994 (21st)	Michael Bolton	
1994 (21st)	Michael Jackson	
1994 (21st)	Rod Stewart	
1995 (22nd)
1995 (22nd)	Michael Bolton	
1995 (22nd)	Bryan Adams	
1995 (22nd)	Meat Loaf	
1996 (23rd)
1996 (23rd)	Michael Jackson	
1996 (23rd)	Elton John	
1996 (23rd)	Seal	
1997 (24th)
1997 (24th)	Eric Clapton	
1997 (24th)	Bryan Adams	
1997 (24th)	Seal	
1998 (25th)
1998 (25th)	Babyface	
1998 (25th)	Beck	
1998 (25th)	Puff Daddy	
1999 (26th)
1999 (26th)	Eric Clapton	
1999 (26th)	Puff Daddy	
1999 (26th)	Will Smith	

=== 2000s ===
Year	Artist	Ref
2000 (27th)
2000 (27th)	Will Smith	
2000 (27th)	Lenny Kravitz	
2000 (27th)	Ricky Martin	
2001 (28th)
2001 (28th)	Kid Rock	
2001 (28th)	Marc Anthony	
2001 (28th)	Eminem	
2002 (29th)
2002 (29th)	Lenny Kravitz	
2002 (29th)	R. Kelly	
2002 (29th)	Shaggy	
2003 (30th)
2003 (30th)	Eminem	
2003 (30th)	Enrique Iglesias	
2003 (30th)	Nelly	
2003 (31st)
2003 (31st)	Kid Rock	
2003 (31st)	Clay Aiken	
2003 (31st)	John Mayer	
2003 (31st)	Justin Timberlake	
2004 (32nd)
2004 (32nd)	Usher	
2004 (32nd)	Josh Groban	
2004 (32nd)	Lenny Kravitz	
2004 (32nd)	Michael McDonald	
2005 (33rd)
2005 (33rd)	Will Smith	
2005 (33rd)	50 Cent	
2005 (33rd)	Rob Thomas	
2006 (34th)
2006 (34th)	Sean Paul	
2006 (34th)	Nick Lachey	
2006 (34th)	Kanye West	
2007 (35th)
2007 (35th)	Justin Timberlake	
2007 (35th)	Akon	
2007 (35th)	Timbaland	
2008 (36th)
2008 (36th)	Chris Brown	
2008 (36th)	Kid Rock	
2008 (36th)	Usher	
2009 (37th)
2009 (37th)	Michael Jackson	
2009 (37th)	Eminem	
2009 (37th)	T.I.	

=== 2010s ===
Year	Artist	Ref
2010 (38th)
2010 (38th)	Justin Bieber	
2010 (38th)	Eminem	
2010 (38th)	Usher	
2011 (39th)
2011 (39th)	Bruno Mars	
2011 (39th)	Justin Bieber	
2011 (39th)	Pitbull	
2012 (40th)
2012 (40th)	Justin Bieber	
2012 (40th)	Flo Rida	
2012 (40th)	Pitbull	
2012 (40th)	Usher	
2013 (41st)
2013 (41st)	Justin Timberlake	
2013 (41st)	Bruno Mars	
2013 (41st)	Robin Thicke	
2014 (42nd)
2014 (42nd)	Sam Smith	
2014 (42nd)	John Legend	
2014 (42nd)	Pharrell Williams	
2015 (43rd)
2015 (43rd)	Ed Sheeran	
2015 (43rd)	Nick Jonas	
2015 (43rd)	Sam Smith	
2016 (44th)
2016 (44th)	Justin Bieber	
2016 (44th)	Drake	
2016 (44th)	The Weeknd	
2017 (45th)
2017 (45th)	Bruno Mars	
2017 (45th)	Drake	
2017 (45th)	Ed Sheeran	
2018 (46th)
2018 (46th)	Post Malone	
2018 (46th)	Drake	
2018 (46th)	Ed Sheeran	
2019 (47th)
2019 (47th)	Khalid	
2019 (47th)	Post Malone	
2019 (47th)	Drake	

=== 2020s ===
Year	Artist	Ref
2020 (48th)
2020 (48th)	Justin Bieber	
2020 (48th)	Post Malone	
2020 (48th)	The Weeknd	
2021 (49th)
2021 (49th)	Ed Sheeran	
2021 (49th)	Drake	
2021 (49th)	Justin Bieber	
2021 (49th)	Lil Nas X	
2021 (49th)	The Weeknd	
2022 (50th)
2022 (50th)	Harry Styles	
2022 (50th)	Bad Bunny	
2022 (50th)	Drake	
2022 (50th)	Ed Sheeran	
2022 (50th)	The Weeknd	
2023 – 24	—N/a	
2025 (51st)
2025 (51st)	Bruno Mars	
2025 (51st)	Benson Boone	
2025 (51st)	Hozier	
2025 (51st)	Teddy Swims	
2025 (51st)	The Weeknd	
2026 (52nd)
2026 (52nd)	Justin Bieber	
2026 (52nd)	Alex Warren	
2026 (52nd)	Benson Boone	
2026 (52nd)	Ed Sheeran	
2026 (52nd)	Harry Styles	

== Category facts ==
=== Multiple wins ===
5 wins

- Justin Bieber

3 wins

- Michael Bolton
- Eric Clapton
- Michael Jackson
- Barry Manilow

2 wins

- John Denver
- Bruno Mars
- Lionel Richie
- Kid Rock
- Kenny Rogers
- Ed Sheeran
- Will Smith
- Justin Timberlake

=== Multiple nominations ===
7 nominations

- Justin Bieber
- Michael Jackson

6 nominations

- Ed Sheeran

5 nominations

- Michael Bolton
- Drake
- Elton John
- The Weeknd

4 nominations

- Bryan Adams
- Eric Clapton
- Eminem
- Billy Joel
- Barry Manilow
- Bruno Mars
- Usher

3 nominations

- Lenny Kravitz
- Lionel Richie
- Kid Rock
- Kenny Rogers
- Will Smith
- Justin Timberlake

2 nominations

- Benson Boone
- Phil Collins
- John Denver
- Peter Frampton
- John Mellencamp
- George Michael
- Pitbull
- Prince
- Puff Daddy
- Seal
- Sam Smith
- Rick Springfield
- Rod Stewart
- Harry Styles
- Stevie Wonder
