= American Music Award for Favorite Pop/Rock Band/Duo/Group =

American Music Award

American Music Awards for Favorite Pop/Rock Band/Duo/Group
- Country: United States
- Presented by: American Music Awards
- First award: 1974
- Final award: 2022
- Currently held by: BTS

Highlights
- Most wins: BTS (4)
- Most nominations: Maroon 5 (7)
- Website: www.theamas.com

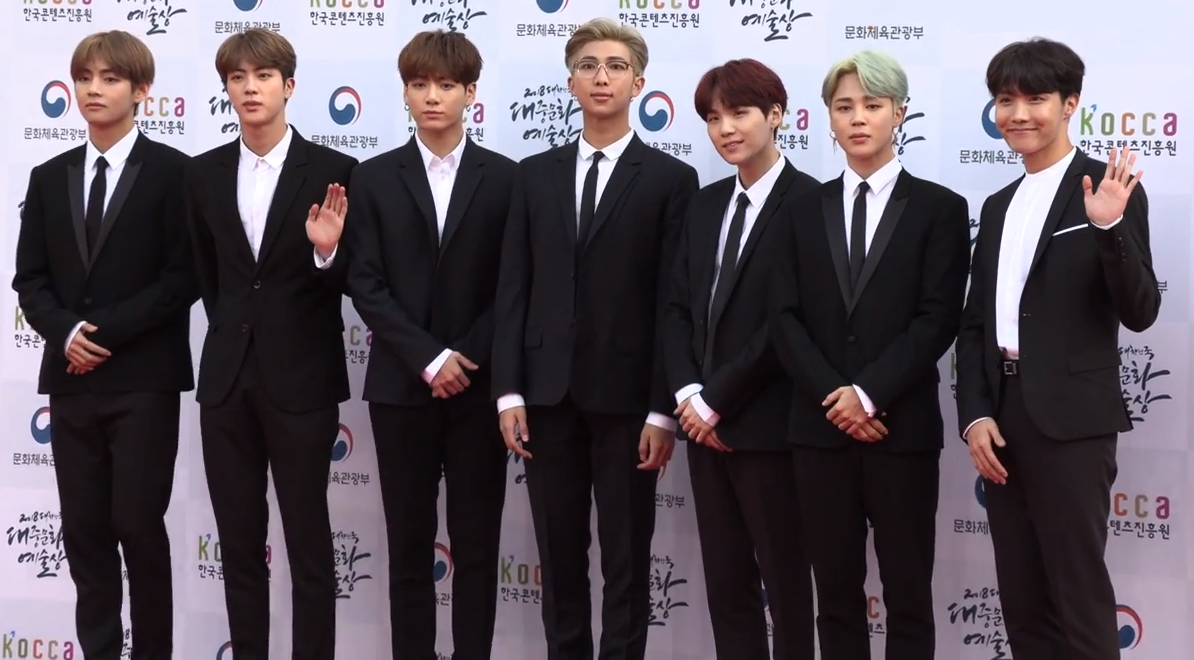
BTS is the most-awarded artist in this category with four consecutive wins.

The American Music Award for Favorite Duo or Group – Pop/Rock has been awarded since 1974. Years reflect the year in which the awards were presented, for works released in the previous year (until 2003 onward when awards were handed out in November of the same year). The most-awarded artist in this category is BTS. The group claimed the all-time record when they won the award for a fourth consecutive year at the 2022 ceremony. No other act has earned as many consecutive wins.

== Winners and nominees ==
=== 1970s ===
| Year | Artist | Ref |
1974 (1st)
| 1974 (1st) | The Carpenters | |
| 1974 (1st) | Gladys Knight & the Pips | |
| 1974 (1st) | Tony Orlando and Dawn | |
1975 (2nd)
| 1975 (2nd) | Gladys Knight & the Pips | |
| 1975 (2nd) | Bachman–Turner Overdrive | |
| 1975 (2nd) | Wings | |
1976 (3rd)
| 1976 (3rd) | Tony Orlando and Dawn | |
| 1976 (3rd) | Eagles | |
| 1976 (3rd) | Earth, Wind & Fire | |
1977 (4th)
| 1977 (4th) | Chicago | |
| 1977 (4th) | Eagles | |
| 1977 (4th) | Earth, Wind & Fire | |
1978 (5th)
| 1978 (5th) | Fleetwood Mac | |
| 1978 (5th) | Eagles | |
| 1978 (5th) | KC and the Sunshine Band | |
1979 (6th)
| 1979 (6th) | Bee Gees | |
| 1979 (6th) | Fleetwood Mac | |
| 1979 (6th) | Foreigner | |

=== 1980s ===
| Year | Artist | Ref |
1980 (7th)
| 1980 (7th) | Bee Gees | |
| 1980 (7th) | Cheap Trick | |
| 1980 (7th) | Supertramp | |
1981 (8th)
| 1981 (8th) | Eagles | |
| 1981 (8th) | Queen | |
| 1981 (8th) | The Rolling Stones | |
1982 (9th)
| 1982 (9th) | Air Supply | |
| 1982 (9th) | AC/DC | |
| 1982 (9th) | The Pointer Sisters | |
| 1982 (9th) | REO Speedwagon | |
1983 (10th)
| 1983 (10th) | Hall & Oates | |
| 1983 (10th) | Fleetwood Mac | |
| 1983 (10th) | The J. Geils Band | |
1984 (11th)
| 1984 (11th) | Hall & Oates | |
| 1984 (11th) | Def Leppard | |
| 1984 (11th) | Men at Work | |
| 1984 (11th) | The Police | |
1985 (12th)
| 1985 (12th) | Hall & Oates | |
| 1985 (12th) | Huey Lewis and the News | |
| 1985 (12th) | Van Halen | |
1986 (13th)
| 1986 (13th) | Chicago | |
| 1986 (13th) | Kool & the Gang | |
| 1986 (13th) | Tears for Fears | |
1987 (14th)
| 1987 (14th) | Huey Lewis and the News | |
| 1987 (14th) | Genesis | |
| 1987 (14th) | Heart | |
| 1987 (14th) | Van Halen | |
1988 (15th)
| 1988 (15th) | Bon Jovi | |
| 1988 (15th) | Lisa Lisa and Cult Jam | |
| 1988 (15th) | U2 | |
1989 (16th)
| 1989 (16th) | Gloria Estefan & Miami Sound Machine | |
| 1989 (16th) | Def Leppard | |
| 1989 (16th) | Van Halen | |

=== 1990s ===
| Year | Artist | Ref |
1990 (17th)
| 1990 (17th) | New Kids on the Block | |
| 1990 (17th) | Bon Jovi | |
| 1990 (17th) | Milli Vanilli | |
1991 (18th)
| 1991 (18th) | Aerosmith | |
| 1991 (18th) | Bell Biv DeVoe | |
| 1991 (18th) | New Kids on the Block | |
1992 (19th)
| 1992 (19th) | C+C Music Factory | |
| 1992 (19th) | Color Me Badd | |
| 1992 (19th) | Guns N' Roses | |
1993 (20th)
| 1993 (20th) | Genesis | |
| 1993 (20th) | Kris Kross | |
| 1993 (20th) | U2 | |
1994 (21st)
| 1994 (21st) | Aerosmith | |
| 1994 (21st) | Pearl Jam | |
| 1994 (21st) | U2 | |
1995 (22nd)
| 1995 (22nd) | Ace of Base | |
| 1995 (22nd) | Pink Floyd | |
| 1995 (22nd) | Stone Temple Pilots | |
1996 (23rd)
| 1996 (23rd) | Eagles | |
| 1996 (23rd) | Boyz II Men | |
| 1996 (23rd) | Hootie & the Blowfish | |
1997 (24th)
| 1997 (24th) | Hootie & the Blowfish | |
| 1997 (24th) | Dave Matthews Band | |
| 1997 (24th) | Fugees | |
1998 (25th)
| 1998 (25th) | Spice Girls | |
| 1998 (25th) | U2 | |
| 1998 (25th) | The Wallflowers | |
1999 (26th)
| 1999 (26th) | Aerosmith | |
| 1999 (26th) | Backstreet Boys | |
| 1999 (26th) | Matchbox Twenty | |

=== 2000s ===
| Year | Artist | Ref |
2000 (27th)
| 2000 (27th) | Backstreet Boys | |
| 2000 (27th) | NSYNC | |
| 2000 (27th) | Santana | |
2001 (28th)
| 2001 (28th) | Backstreet Boys | |
| 2001 (28th) | Creed | |
| 2001 (28th) | NSYNC | |
2002 (29th)
| 2002 (29th) | NSYNC | |
| 2002 (29th) | Dave Matthews Band | |
| 2002 (29th) | U2 | |
2003 (30th)
| 2003 (30th) | Creed | |
| 2003 (30th) | Linkin Park | |
| 2003 (30th) | Nickelback | |
2003 (31st)
| 2003 (31st) | Fleetwood Mac | |
| 2003 (31st) | 3 Doors Down | |
| 2003 (31st) | Matchbox Twenty | |
2004 (32nd)
| 2004 (32nd) | Outkast | |
| 2004 (32nd) | Evanescence | |
| 2004 (32nd) | Nickelback | |
2005 (33rd)
| 2005 (33rd) | The Black Eyed Peas | |
| 2005 (33rd) | 3 Doors Down | |
| 2005 (33rd) | Green Day | |
2006 (34th)
| 2006 (34th) | Red Hot Chili Peppers | |
| 2006 (34th) | Nickelback | |
| 2006 (34th) | The Pussycat Dolls | |
2007 (35th)
| 2007 (35th) | Nickelback | |
| 2007 (35th) | Linkin Park | |
| 2007 (35th) | Maroon 5 | |
2008 (36th)
| 2008 (36th) | Daughtry | |
| 2008 (36th) | Coldplay | |
| 2008 (36th) | Eagles | |
2009 (37th)
| 2009 (37th) | The Black Eyed Peas | |
| 2009 (37th) | Kings of Leon | |
| 2009 (37th) | Nickelback | |

=== 2010s ===
| Year | Artist | Ref |
2010 (38th)
| 2010 (38th) | The Black Eyed Peas | |
| 2010 (38th) | Lady Antebellum | |
| 2010 (38th) | Train | |
2011 (39th)
| 2011 (39th) | Maroon 5 | |
| 2011 (39th) | LMFAO | |
| 2011 (39th) | OneRepublic | |
2012 (40th)
| 2012 (40th) | Maroon 5 | |
| 2012 (40th) | Fun | |
| 2012 (40th) | One Direction | |
| 2012 (40th) | The Wanted | |
2013 (41st)
| 2013 (41st) | One Direction | |
| 2013 (41st) | Imagine Dragons | |
| 2013 (41st) | Macklemore & Ryan Lewis | |
2014 (42nd)
| 2014 (42nd) | One Direction | |
| 2014 (42nd) | Imagine Dragons | |
| 2014 (42nd) | OneRepublic | |
2015 (43rd)
| 2015 (43rd) | One Direction | |
| 2015 (43rd) | Maroon 5 | |
| 2015 (43rd) | Walk the Moon | |
2016 (44th)
| 2016 (44th) | Twenty One Pilots | |
| 2016 (44th) | The Chainsmokers | |
| 2016 (44th) | DNCE | |
2017 (45th)
| 2017 (45th) | Imagine Dragons | |
| 2017 (45th) | The Chainsmokers | |
| 2017 (45th) | Coldplay | |
2018 (46th)
| 2018 (46th) | Migos | |
| 2018 (46th) | Imagine Dragons | |
| 2018 (46th) | Maroon 5 | |
2019 (47th)
| 2019 (47th) | BTS | |
| 2019 (47th) | Jonas Brothers | |
| 2019 (47th) | Panic! at the Disco | |

=== 2020s ===
| Year | Artist | Ref |
2020 (48th)
| 2020 (48th) | BTS | |
| 2020 (48th) | Jonas Brothers | |
| 2020 (48th) | Maroon 5 | |
2021 (49th)
| 2021 (49th) | BTS | |
| 2021 (49th) | AJR | |
| 2021 (49th) | Glass Animals | |
| 2021 (49th) | Maroon 5 | |
| 2021 (49th) | Silk Sonic | |
2022 (50th)
| 2022 (50th) | BTS | |
| 2022 (50th) | Coldplay | |
| 2022 (50th) | Imagine Dragons | |
| 2022 (50th) | Måneskin | |
| 2022 (50th) | OneRepublic | |

== Category facts ==
=== Multiple wins ===
4 wins

- BTS

3 wins

- Aerosmith
- The Black Eyed Peas
- Hall & Oates
- One Direction

2 wins

- Backstreet Boys
- Bee Gees
- Chicago
- Eagles
- Fleetwood Mac
- Maroon 5

=== Multiple nominations ===
7 nominations

- Maroon 5

6 nominations

- Eagles

5 nominations

- Imagine Dragons
- Nickelback
- U2

4 nominations

- BTS
- Fleetwood Mac
- One Direction

3 nominations

- Aerosmith
- Backstreet Boys
- The Black Eyed Peas
- Coldplay
- Hall & Oates
- NSYNC
- OneRepublic
- Van Halen

2 nominations

- 3 Doors Down
- Bee Gees
- Bon Jovi
- The Chainsmokers
- Chicago
- Creed
- Dave Matthews Band
- Def Leppard
- Earth, Wind & Fire
- Genesis
- Gladys Knight & the Pips
- Hootie & the Blowfish
- Huey Lewis and the News
- Jonas Brothers
- Linkin Park
- Matchbox Twenty
- New Kids on the Block
- Tony Orlando and Dawn
