= American Music Award of Merit =

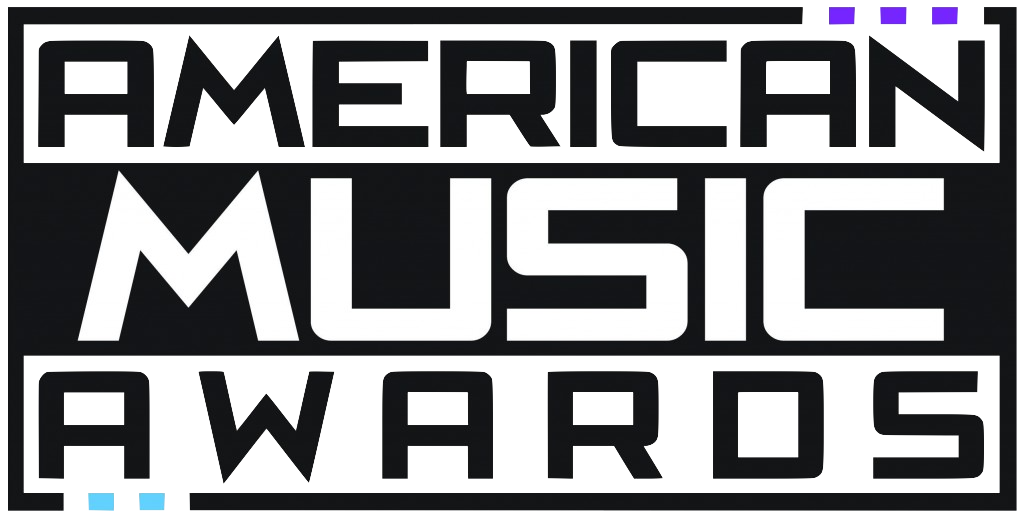
Official logo of the AMAs

The American Music Award of Merit is given to artists who have made "truly exceptional contributions" to the music industry.

== 2020s ==
- 2026: Not Awarded
- 2025: Not Awarded
- 2022: Not Awarded
- 2021: Not Awarded
- 2020: Not Awarded

== 2010s ==
- 2019: Not Awarded
- 2018: Not Awarded
- 2017: Not Awarded
- 2016: Sting
- 2015: Not Awarded
- 2014: Not Awarded
- 2013: Not Awarded
- 2012: Not Awarded
- 2011: Not Awarded
- 2010: Not Awarded

== 2000s ==
- 2009: Not Awarded
- 2008: Annie Lennox
- 2007: Not Awarded
- 2006: Not Awarded
- 2005: Not Awarded
- 2004: Bon Jovi
- 2003 (November): Not Awarded
- 2003 (January): Alabama
- 2002: Garth Brooks
- 2001: Janet Jackson
- 2000: Gloria Estefan

== 1990s ==
- 1999: Billy Joel
- 1998: Frank Sinatra
- 1997: Little Richard
- 1996: Tammy Wynette
- 1995: Prince
- 1994: Whitney Houston
- 1993: Bill Graham
- 1992: James Brown
- 1991: Merle Haggard
- 1990: Neil Diamond

== 1980s ==
- 1989: Willie Nelson
- 1988: The Beach Boys
- 1987: Elvis Presley
- 1986: Paul McCartney
- 1985: Loretta Lynn
- 1984: Michael Jackson
- 1983: Kenny Rogers
- 1982: Stevie Wonder
- 1981: Chuck Berry
- 1980: Benny Goodman

== 1970s ==
- 1979: Perry Como
- 1978: Ella Fitzgerald
- 1977: Johnny Cash
- 1976: Irving Berlin
- 1975: Berry Gordy
- 1974: Bing Crosby
