= American Music Award for Favorite Soul/R&B Band/Duo/Group =

American music award

American Music Awards for Favorite Soul/R&B Band/Duo/Group
- Country: United States
- Presented by: American Music Awards
- First award: 1974
- Final award: 2009
- Currently held by: The Black Eyed Peas

Highlights
- Most wins: Boyz II Men; Earth, Wind & Fire; Gladys Knight & the Pips (4 each)
- Most nominations: Earth, Wind & Fire (6)
- Website: theamas.com

The American Music Award for Favorite Soul/R&B Band/Duo/Group was awarded since 1974, but has been discontinued since 2009. Years reflect the year in which the awards were presented, for works released in the previous year (until 2003 onward when awards were handed out on November of the same year). The all-time winner in this category is tied between three acts, Boyz II Men, Earth, Wind & Fire and Gladys Knight & the Pips with 4 wins each.

== Winners and nominees ==
=== 1970s ===
| Year | Artist | Ref |
1974 (1st)
| 1974 (1st) | The Temptations | |
| 1974 (1st) | Gladys Knight & the Pips | |
| 1974 (1st) | The O'Jays | |
1975 (2nd)
| 1975 (2nd) | Gladys Knight & the Pips | |
| 1975 (2nd) | The O'Jays | |
| 1975 (2nd) | The Stylistics | |
1976 (3rd)
| 1976 (3rd) | Gladys Knight & the Pips | |
| 1976 (3rd) | Earth, Wind & Fire | |
| 1976 (3rd) | KC and the Sunshine Band | |
1977 (4th)
| 1977 (4th) | Earth, Wind & Fire | |
| 1977 (4th) | KC and the Sunshine Band | |
| 1977 (4th) | The O'Jays | |
1978 (5th)
| 1978 (5th) | Earth, Wind & Fire | |
| 1978 (5th) | Commodores | |
| 1978 (5th) | KC and the Sunshine Band | |
1979 (6th)
| 1979 (6th) | Earth, Wind & Fire | |
| 1979 (6th) | Commodores | |
| 1979 (6th) | The Emotions | |

=== 1980s ===
| Year | Artist | Ref |
1980 (7th)
| 1980 (7th) | Commodores | |
| 1980 (7th) | Chic | |
| 1980 (7th) | Earth, Wind & Fire | |
1981 (8th)
| 1981 (8th) | Earth, Wind & Fire | |
| 1981 (8th) | Kool & the Gang | |
| 1981 (8th) | The O'Jays | |
1982 (9th)
| 1982 (9th) | Kool & the Gang | |
| 1982 (9th) | The Gap Band | |
| 1982 (9th) | Ray Parker Jr. & Raydio | |
| 1982 (9th) | The Whispers | |
1983 (10th)
| 1983 (10th) | Kool & the Gang | |
| 1983 (10th) | The Gap Band | |
| 1983 (10th) | The Time | |
1984 (11th)
| 1984 (11th) | Gladys Knight & the Pips | |
| 1984 (11th) | DeBarge | |
| 1984 (11th) | The Gap Band | |
| 1984 (11th) | The Isley Brothers | |
1985 (12th)
| 1985 (12th) | The Pointer Sisters | |
| 1985 (12th) | Kool & the Gang | |
| 1985 (12th) | The Time | |
1986 (13th)
| 1986 (13th) | Kool & the Gang | |
| 1986 (13th) | New Edition | |
| 1986 (13th) | Ready for the World | |
1987 (14th)
| 1987 (14th) | New Edition | |
| 1987 (14th) | Atlantic Starr | |
| 1987 (14th) | Cameo | |
| 1987 (14th) | Run–D.M.C. | |
1988 (15th)
| 1988 (15th) | Cameo | |
| 1988 (15th) | Club Nouveau | |
| 1988 (15th) | Lisa Lisa and Cult Jam | |
1989 (16th)
| 1989 (16th) | Gladys Knight & the Pips | |
| 1989 (16th) | New Edition | |
| 1989 (16th) | Salt-N-Pepa | |

=== 1990s ===
| Year | Artist | Ref |
1990 (17th)
| 1990 (17th) | The O'Jays | |
| 1990 (17th) | Guy | |
| 1990 (17th) | Soul II Soul | |
1991 (18th)
| 1991 (18th) | Tony! Toni! Toné! | |
| 1991 (18th) | After 7 | |
| 1991 (18th) | Bell Biv DeVoe | |
1992 (19th)
| 1992 (19th) | Bell Biv DeVoe | |
| 1992 (19th) | Boyz II Men | |
| 1992 (19th) | DJ Jazzy Jeff & The Fresh Prince | |
1993 (20th)
| 1993 (20th) | Boyz II Men | |
| 1993 (20th) | En Vogue | |
| 1993 (20th) | Jodeci | |
1994 (21st)
| 1994 (21st) | En Vogue | |
| 1994 (21st) | Arrested Development | |
| 1994 (21st) | SWV | |
1995 (22nd)
| 1995 (22nd) | Boyz II Men | |
| 1995 (22nd) | Jodeci | |
| 1995 (22nd) | Salt-N-Pepa | |
1996 (23rd)
| 1996 (23rd) | Boyz II Men | |
| 1996 (23rd) | Jodeci | |
| 1996 (23rd) | TLC | |
1997 (24th)
| 1997 (24th) | New Edition | |
| 1997 (24th) | Fugees | |
| 1997 (24th) | TLC | |
1998 (25th)
| 1998 (25th) | Boyz II Men | |
| 1998 (25th) | Dru Hill | |
| 1998 (25th) | En Vogue | |
1999 (26th)
| 1999 (26th) | K-Ci & JoJo | |
| 1999 (26th) | Next | |
| 1999 (26th) | Xscape | |

=== 2000s ===
| Year | Artist | Ref |
2000 (27th)
| 2000 (27th) | TLC | |
| 2000 (27th) | Dru Hill | |
| 2000 (27th) | K-Ci & JoJo | |
2001 (28th)
| 2001 (28th) | Destiny's Child | |
| 2001 (28th) | Jagged Edge | |
| 2001 (28th) | Lucy Pearl | |
2002 (29th)
| 2002 (29th) | Destiny's Child | |
| 2002 (29th) | The Isley Brothers | |
| 2002 (29th) | Jagged Edge | |
2003 (30th)
| 2003 (30th) | Outkast | |
| 2003 (30th) | B2K | |
| 2003 (30th) | Nappy Roots | |
2003 (31st)
| 2003 (31st) | The Isley Brothers | |
| 2003 (31st) | B2K | |
| 2003 (31st) | Dru Hill | |
| 2004 | —N/a | |
2005 (33rd)
| 2005 (33rd) | Destiny's Child | |
| 2005 (33rd) | 112 | |
| 2005 (33rd) | Pretty Ricky | |
2006 (34th)
| 2006 (34th) | The Black Eyed Peas | |
| 2006 (34th) | The Isley Brothers | |
| 2006 (34th) | Jagged Edge | |
| 2007 – 08 | —N/a | |
2009 (37th)
| 2009 (37th) | The Black Eyed Peas | |
| 2009 (37th) | Day26 | |
| 2009 (37th) | Mary Mary | |

== Category facts ==
=== Multiple Wins ===
4 wins

- Boyz II Men
- Earth, Wind & Fire
- Gladys Knight & the Pips

3 wins

- Destiny's Child
- Kool & the Gang

2 wins

- The Black Eyed Peas
- New Edition

=== Multiple Nominations ===
6 nominations

- Earth, Wind & Fire

5 nominations

- Boyz II Men
- Gladys Knight & the Pips
- Kool & the Gang
- The O'Jays

4 nominations

- The Isley Brothers
- New Edition

3 nominations

- Commodores
- Destiny's Child
- Dru Hill
- En Vogue
- The Gap Band
- Jagged Edge
- Jodeci
- KC and the Sunshine Band
- TLC

2 nominations

- B2K
- Bell Biv DeVoe
- Cameo
- K-Ci & JoJo
- Salt-N-Pepa
- The Time
