= American Music Awards of 2003 =

American Music Awards of 2003 may refer to:

- American Music Awards of 2003 (January)
- American Music Awards of 2003 (November)
