= American Music Award for Favorite Rap/Hip Hop Artist =

American music award for rap and hip hop

American Music Awards for Favorite Rap/Hip Hop Artist
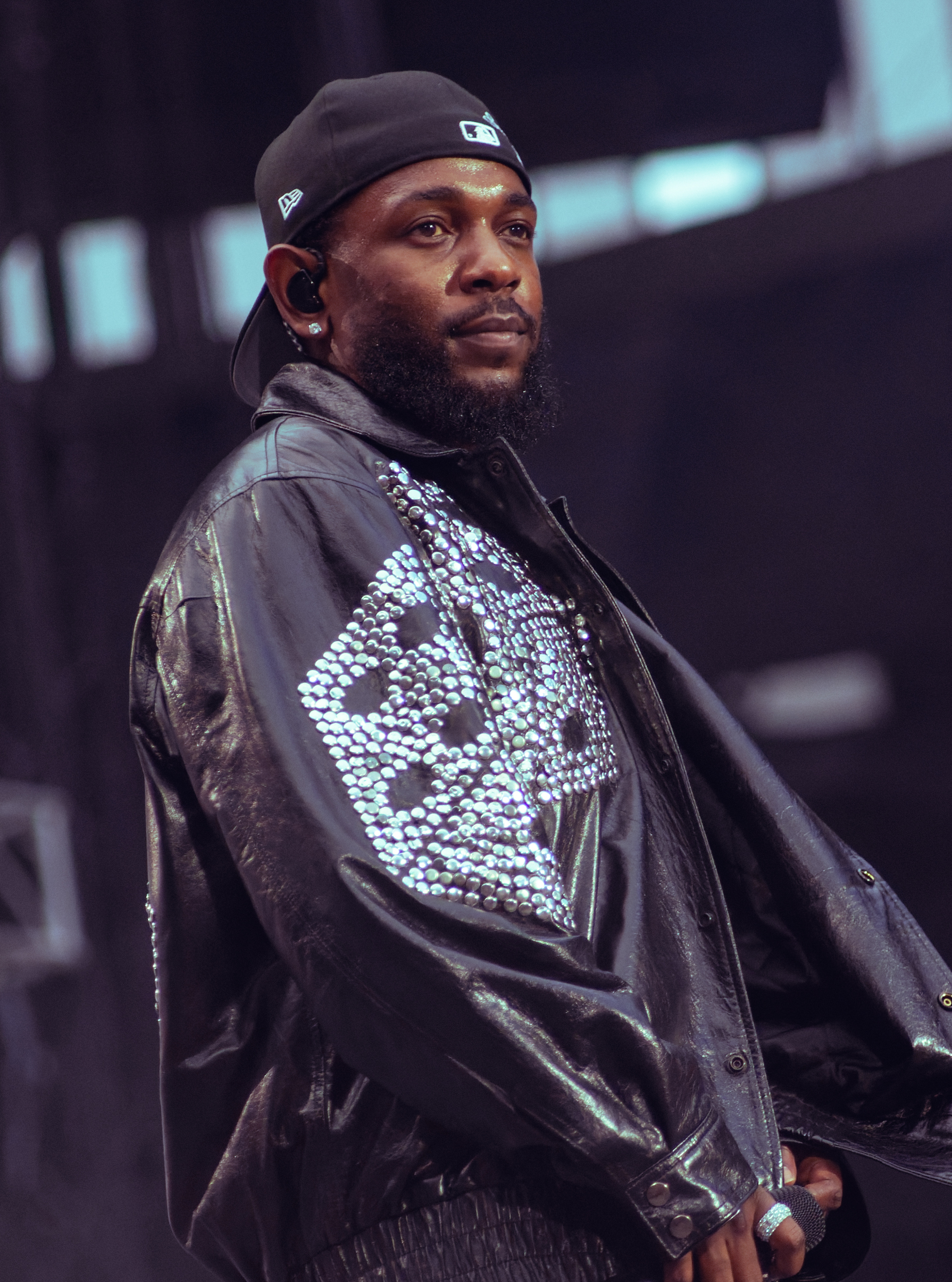
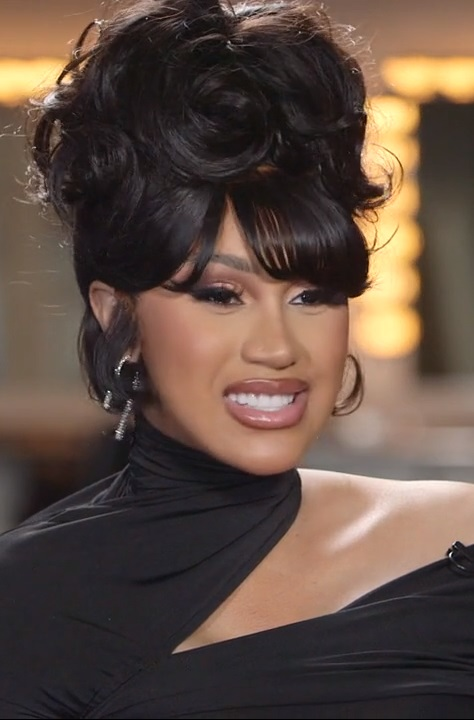
- Kendrick Lamar and Cardi B are the most recent recipients
- Country: United States
- Presented by: American Music Awards
- First award: 1989
- Currently held by: Kendrick Lamar; Cardi B

Highlights
- Most wins: Eminem and Nicki Minaj (5)
- Most nominations: Drake (11)
- Website: theamas.com

The American Music Award for Favorite Artist – Rap/Hip Hop has been awarded since 1989. Years reflect the year during which the awards were presented, for works released in the previous year (until 2003 onward, when awards were handed out in November of the same year). Eminem and Nicki Minaj has received the most wins (5) and Drake has received the most nominations (11).

== Winners and nominees ==
=== 1980s ===
Year	Artist	Ref
1989 (16th)
1989 (16th)	DJ Jazzy Jeff & The Fresh Prince	
1989 (16th)	Run–D.M.C.	
1989 (16th)	Salt-N-Pepa	

=== 1990s ===
Year	Artist	Ref
1990 (17th)
1990 (17th)	MC Hammer	
1990 (17th)	Eazy-E	
1990 (17th)	Tone Lōc	
1991 (18th)
1991 (18th)	MC Hammer	
1991 (18th)	Too Short	
1991 (18th)	Vanilla Ice	
1992 (19th)
1992 (19th)	MC Hammer	
1992 (19th)	DJ Jazzy Jeff & The Fresh Prince	
1992 (19th)	N.W.A	
1993 (20th)
1993 (20th)	Sir Mix-a-Lot	
1993 (20th)	Kris Kross	
1993 (20th)	TLC	
1994 (21st)
1994 (21st)	Dr. Dre	
1994 (21st)	Onyx	
1994 (21st)	Tupac Shakur	
1995 (22nd)
1995 (22nd)	Snoop Dogg	
1995 (22nd)	Salt-N-Pepa	
1995 (22nd)	Warren G	
1996 (23rd)
1996 (23rd)	Coolio	
1996 (23rd)	Bone Thugs-n-Harmony	
1996 (23rd)	Naughty by Nature	
1997 (24th)
1997 (24th)	Tupac Shakur	
1997 (24th)	Bone Thugs-n-Harmony	
1997 (24th)	Coolio	
1998 (25th)
1998 (25th)	Bone Thugs-n-Harmony	
1998 (25th)	Puff Daddy	
1998 (25th)	Wu-Tang Clan	
1999 (26th)
1999 (26th)	Master P	
1999 (26th)	Beastie Boys	
1999 (26th)	Puff Daddy	

=== 2000s ===
Year	Artist	Ref
2000 (27th)
2000 (27th)	DMX	
2000 (27th)	Jay-Z	
2000 (27th)	Juvenile	
2001 (28th)
2001 (28th)	Dr. Dre	
2001 (28th)	DMX	
2001 (28th)	Eminem	
2002 (29th)
2002 (29th)	Nelly	
2002 (29th)	Ja Rule	
2002 (29th)	Shaggy	
2003 (30th)	Favorite Hip Hop/R&B Male Artist	
2003 (30th)	Eminem	
2003 (30th)	Ja Rule	
2003 (30th)	Nelly	
2003 (30th)	Favorite Hip Hop/R&B Female Artist	
2003 (30th)	Mary J. Blige	
2003 (30th)	Ashanti	
2003 (30th)	Jennifer Lopez	
2003 (31st)	Favorite Rap/Hip Hop Male Artist	
2003 (31st)	50 Cent	
2003 (31st)	Eminem	
2003 (31st)	Nelly	
2003 (31st)	Sean Paul	
2003 (31st)	Favorite Rap/Hip Hop Female Artist	
2003 (31st)	Missy Elliott	
2003 (31st)	Eve	
2003 (31st)	Lil' Kim	
2004 (32nd)
2004 (32nd)	Jay-Z	
2004 (32nd)	Juvenile	
2004 (32nd)	Lil' Flip	
2004 (32nd)	Kanye West	
2005 (33rd)	Favorite Rap/Hip Hop Male Artist	
2005 (33rd)	Eminem	
2005 (33rd)	50 Cent	
2005 (33rd)	Ludacris	
2005 (33rd)	Favorite Rap/Hip Hop Female Artist	
2005 (33rd)	Missy Elliott	
2005 (33rd)	Lil' Kim	
2005 (33rd)	Trina	
2006 (34th)
2006 (34th)	Eminem	
2006 (34th)	T.I.	
2006 (34th)	Kanye West	
2007 (35th)
2007 (35th)	T.I.	
2007 (35th)	Fabolous	
2007 (35th)	Young Jeezy	
2008 (36th)
2008 (36th)	Kanye West	
2008 (36th)	Flo Rida	
2008 (36th)	Lil Wayne	
2009 (37th)
2009 (37th)	Jay-Z	
2009 (37th)	Eminem	
2009 (37th)	T.I.	

=== 2010s ===
Year	Artist	Ref
2010 (38th)
2010 (38th)	Eminem	
2010 (38th)	B.o.B	
2010 (38th)	Drake	
2011 (39th)
2011 (39th)	Nicki Minaj	
2011 (39th)	Lil Wayne	
2011 (39th)	Kanye West	
2012 (40th)
2012 (40th)	Nicki Minaj	
2012 (40th)	Drake	
2012 (40th)	Tyga	
2013 (41st)
2013 (41st)	Macklemore & Ryan Lewis	
2013 (41st)	Jay-Z	
2013 (41st)	Lil Wayne	
2014 (42nd)
2014 (42nd)	Iggy Azalea	
2014 (42nd)	Drake	
2014 (42nd)	Eminem	
2015 (43rd)
2015 (43rd)	Nicki Minaj	
2015 (43rd)	Drake	
2015 (43rd)	Fetty Wap	
2016 (44th)
2016 (44th)	Drake	
2016 (44th)	Fetty Wap	
2016 (44th)	Future	
2017 (45th)
2017 (45th)	Drake	
2017 (45th)	Kendrick Lamar	
2017 (45th)	Migos	
2018 (46th)
2018 (46th)	Cardi B	
2018 (46th)	Drake	
2018 (46th)	Post Malone	
2019 (47th)
2019 (47th)	Cardi B	
2019 (47th)	Drake	
2019 (47th)	Post Malone	

=== 2020s ===
Year	Artist	Ref
2020 (48th)	Favorite Rap/Hip Hop Male Artist	
2020 (48th)	Juice WRLD	
2020 (48th)	DaBaby	
2020 (48th)	Roddy Ricch	
2020 (48th)	Favorite Rap/Hip Hop Female Artist	
2020 (48th)	Nicki Minaj	
2020 (48th)	Cardi B	
2020 (48th)	Megan Thee Stallion	
2021 (49th)	Favorite Rap/Hip Hop Male Artist	
2021 (49th)	Drake	
2021 (49th)	Lil Baby	
2021 (49th)	Moneybagg Yo	
2021 (49th)	Polo G	
2021 (49th)	Pop Smoke	
2021 (49th)	Favorite Rap/Hip Hop Female Artist	
2021 (49th)	Megan Thee Stallion	
2021 (49th)	Cardi B	
2021 (49th)	Coi Leray	
2021 (49th)	Erica Banks	
2021 (49th)	Saweetie	
2022 (50th)	Favorite Rap/Hip Hop Male Artist	
2022 (50th)	Kendrick Lamar	
2022 (50th)	Drake	
2022 (50th)	Future	
2022 (50th)	Lil Baby	
2022 (50th)	Lil Durk	
2022 (50th)	Favorite Rap/Hip Hop Female Artist	
2022 (50th)	Nicki Minaj	
2022 (50th)	Cardi B	
2022 (50th)	GloRilla	
2022 (50th)	Latto	
2022 (50th)	Megan Thee Stallion	
2023 – 24	—N/a	
2025 (51st)	Favorite Rap/Hip Hop Male Artist	
2025 (51st)	Eminem	
2025 (51st)	Drake	
2025 (51st)	Future	
2025 (51st)	Kendrick Lamar	
2025 (51st)	Tyler, the Creator	
2025 (51st)	Favorite Rap/Hip Hop Female Artist	
2025 (51st)	Megan Thee Stallion	
2025 (51st)	Doechii	
2025 (51st)	GloRilla	
2025 (51st)	Latto	
2025 (51st)	Sexyy Red	
2026 (52nd)	Best Male Hip-Hop Artist	
2026 (52nd)	Kendrick Lamar	
2026 (52nd)	Don Toliver	
2026 (52nd)	Playboi Carti	
2026 (52nd)	Tyler, the Creator	
2026 (52nd)	YoungBoy Never Broke Again	
2026 (52nd)	Best Female Hip-Hop Artist	
2026 (52nd)	Cardi B	
2026 (52nd)	Doechii	
2026 (52nd)	GloRilla	
2026 (52nd)	Sexyy Red	
2026 (52nd)	YK Niece	

== Category facts ==
=== Multiple wins ===
5 wins

- Eminem
- Nicki Minaj

3 wins

- Cardi B
- Drake
- MC Hammer

2 wins

- Dr. Dre
- Jay-Z
- Missy Elliott
- Kendrick Lamar
- Megan Thee Stallion

=== Multiple nominations ===
11 nominations

- Drake

8 nominations

- Eminem

6 nominations

- Cardi B

5 nominations

- Nicki Minaj

4 nominations

- Jay-Z
- Kendrick Lamar
- Megan Thee Stallion
- Kanye West

3 nominations

- Bone Thugs-n-Harmony
- GloRilla
- Lil Wayne
- MC Hammer
- Nelly
- T.I.

2 nominations

- 50 Cent
- Coolio
- DJ Jazzy Jeff & The Fresh Prince
- DMX
- Doechii
- Dr. Dre
- Fetty Wap
- Future
- Ja Rule
- Juvenile
- Latto
- Lil Baby
- Lil' Kim
- Missy Elliott
- Puff Daddy
- Salt-N-Pepa
- Sexyy Red
- Tupac Shakur
- Tyler, the Creator
