= American Music Awards of 1995 =

Annual music awards

22nd Annual American Music Awards
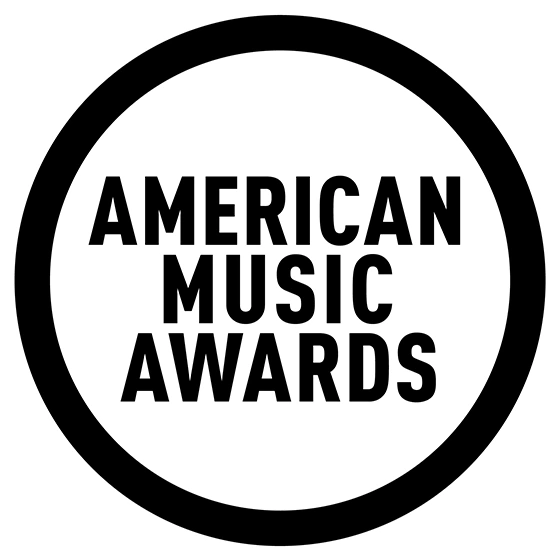
- Date: January 30, 1995
- Location: Shrine Auditorium, Los Angeles, California
- Country: United States
- Hosted by: Tom Jones; Lorrie Morgan; Queen Latifah
- Most awards: Boyz II Men (3)
- Most nominations: Boyz II Men and Mariah Carey (4 each)

Television/radio coverage
- Network: ABC
- Runtime: 180 min.
- Produced by: Dick Clark Productions

The 22nd Annual American Music Awards were held on January 30, 1995, at the Shrine Auditorium, in Los Angeles, California. The awards recognized the most popular artists and albums from the year 1994.

== Performances ==
Artist(s)	Song(s)
Little Richard; The Go-Go's	"Tutti Frutti"^{[a]}
Celine Dion	"The Power of Love"
Boyz II Men	"On Bended Knee"
Crash Test Dummies	"Mmm Mmm Mmm Mmm"
Lorrie Morgan	"Something In Red"
Madonna; Babyface	"Take a Bow"
Tim McGraw	"Refried Dreams"
Queen Latifah	"My Funny Valentine"
Tom Jones	"I Wanna Get Back with You"
Page and Plant^{[c]}	"Black Dog"
Jamie King^{[b]}	The Purple medley: "Batdance" "When Doves Cry" "Kiss" "Cream (Prince song)" "1999" "Purple Rain"
Prince	"I Hate U" "319" "Billy Jack Bitch"
Black Men United	"U Will Know"
Harry Belafonte; Quincy Jones; Kenny Rogers; All the artists	"We Are the World"^{^[d]}

Notes

- ^{^[a]} "Tutti Frutti"'s 40th anniversary celebration.
- ^{^[b]} Choreography and direction.
- ^{^[c]} Broadcast live from London.
- ^{^[d]} "We Are the World"'s 10th anniversary celebration.

== Winners and nominees ==
Subcategory	Winner	Nominees
Pop/Rock Category
Favorite Pop/Rock Male Artist	Michael Bolton	Bryan Adams; Meat Loaf
Favorite Pop/Rock Female Artist	Mariah Carey	Janet Jackson; Bonnie Raitt
Favorite Pop/Rock Band/Duo/Group	Ace of Base	Pink Floyd; Stone Temple Pilots
Favorite Pop/Rock Album	The Lion King Soundtrack	Music Box – Mariah Carey; August and Everything After – Counting Crows
Favorite Pop/Rock Song	"I'll Make Love To You" – Boyz II Men	"The Sign" – Ace of Base "The Power of Love" – Celine Dion
Favorite Pop/Rock New Artist	Ace of Base	All-4-One; Counting Crows
Soul/R&B Category
Favorite Soul/R&B Male Artist	Babyface	Tevin Campbell; Prince
Favorite Soul/R&B Female Artist	Anita Baker	Toni Braxton; Janet Jackson
Favorite Soul/R&B Band/Duo/Group	Boyz II Men	Jodeci; Salt-N-Pepa
Favorite Soul/R&B Album	Toni Braxton – Toni Braxton	Music Box – Mariah Carey; 12 Play – R. Kelly
Favorite Soul/R&B Song	"I'll Make Love To You" – Boyz II Men	"I Swear" – All-4-One "Whatta Man" – Salt-N-Pepa & En Vogue
Favorite Soul/R&B New Artist	All-4-One	Aaliyah; Warren G
Country Category
Favorite Country Male Artist	Garth Brooks	Vince Gill; Alan Jackson
Favorite Country Female Artist	Reba McEntire	Mary Chapin Carpenter; Lorrie Morgan
Favorite Country Band/Duo/Group	Alabama	Brooks & Dunn; Little Texas
Favorite Country Album	Read My Mind – Reba McEntire	Who I Am – Alan Jackson; Common Thread: The Songs of the Eagles – Various Artists
Favorite Country Song	"Whenever You Come Around" – Vince Gill	"Indian Outlaw" – Tim McGraw "I Swear" – John Michael Montgomery
Favorite Country New Artist	Tim McGraw	Faith Hill; The Mavericks
Adult Contemporary Category
Favorite Adult Contemporary Artist	Michael Bolton	Boyz II Men; Mariah Carey
Alternative Category
Favorite Alternative Artist	Counting Crows	Green Day; Nine Inch Nails
Heavy Metal/Hard Rock Category
Favorite Heavy Metal/Hard Rock Artist	Nirvana	Pearl Jam; Stone Temple Pilots
Rap/Hip-Hop Category
Favorite Rap/Hip-Hop Artist	Snoop Doggy Dogg	Salt-N-Pepa; Warren G
Merit
Prince
International Artist Award
Led Zeppelin
