= American Music Awards of 1996 =

US television program

23rd Annual American Music Awards
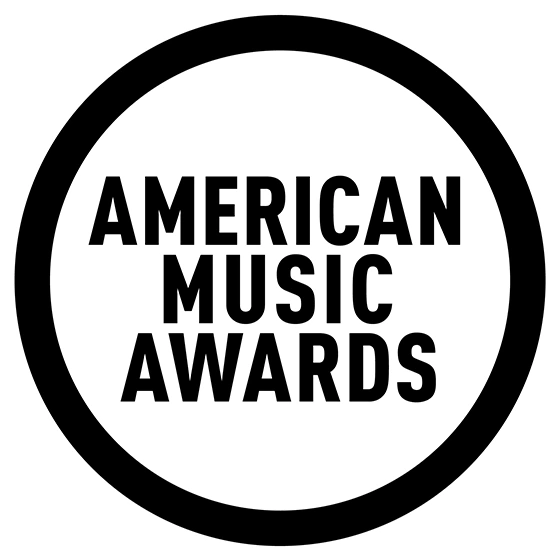
- American music awards
- Date: January 29, 1996
- Location: Shrine Auditorium, Los Angeles, California
- Country: United States
- Hosted by: Jeff Foxworthy; Sinbad
- Most awards: Garth Brooks and Eagles (3 each)
- Most nominations: Boyz II Men and Hootie & the Blowfish (5 each)

Television/radio coverage
- Network: ABC
- Runtime: 180 min.
- Produced by: Dick Clark Productions

The 23rd Annual American Music Awards were held on January 29, 1996, at the Shrine Auditorium, in Los Angeles, California. The awards recognized the most popular artists and albums from the year 1995.

The ceremony was remembered by country singer-songwriter Garth Brooks refusing to accept the Favorite Artist of the Year Award.

== Performances ==
Artist(s)	Song(s)
Mariah Carey	"Fantasy"
Luther Vandross	"The Impossible Dream"
Shania Twain	"(If You're Not in It for Love) I'm Outta Here!"
Reba McEntire	"Please Come to Boston"
The Smashing Pumpkins	"1979"
Brandy	"Baby"
Neil Diamond	"Can Anybody Hear Me"
Lionel Richie	"Don't Wanna Lose You"
LL Cool J	"Mama Said Knock You Out" "Hey Lover"
Garth Brooks	"The Change"

== Winners and nominees ==
Subcategory	Winner	Nominees
Artist of the Year
Artist of the Year	Garth Brooks (Refused); TLC (Accepted)	Boyz II Men; Green Day; Hootie & the Blowfish
Pop/Rock Category
Favorite Pop/Rock Male Artist	Michael Jackson	Elton John; Seal
Favorite Pop/Rock Female Artist	Mariah Carey	Melissa Etheridge; Alanis Morissette
Favorite Pop/Rock Band/Duo/Group	Eagles	Boyz II Men; Hootie & the Blowfish
Favorite Pop/Rock Album	Hell Freezes Over – Eagles	II – Boyz II Men; Cracked Rear View – Hootie & the Blowfish
Favorite Pop/Rock New Artist	Hootie & the Blowfish	Blues Traveler; Alanis Morissette
Soul/R&B Category
Favorite Soul/R&B Male Artist	Luther Vandross	Michael Jackson; Barry White
Favorite Soul/R&B Female Artist	Mariah Carey	Anita Baker; Brandy
Favorite Soul/R&B Band/Duo/Group	Boyz II Men	Jodeci; TLC
Favorite Soul/R&B Album	II – Boyz II Men	My Life – Mary J. Blige; CrazySexyCool – TLC
Favorite Soul/R&B New Artist	Brandy	Monica; Soul for Real
Country Category
Favorite Country Male Artist	Garth Brooks	Alan Jackson; George Strait
Favorite Country Female Artist	Reba McEntire	Mary Chapin Carpenter; Shania Twain
Favorite Country Band/Duo/Group	Alabama	BlackHawk; Brooks & Dunn
Favorite Country Album	The Hits – Garth Brooks	Waitin' on Sundown – Brooks & Dunn; The Woman in Me – Shania Twain
Favorite Country New Artist	Shania Twain	Rhett Akins; Ty Herndon
Adult Contemporary Category
Favorite Adult Contemporary Artist	Eagles	Hootie & the Blowfish; Michael Jackson
Alternative Category
Favorite Alternative Artist	Pearl Jam	Green Day; Nine Inch Nails
Heavy Metal/Hard Rock Category
Favorite Heavy Metal/Hard Rock Artist	Pearl Jam	Green Day; Van Halen
Rap/Hip-Hop Category
Favorite Rap/Hip-Hop Artist	Coolio	Bone Thugs-n-Harmony; Naughty by Nature
Soundtrack Category
Favorite Soundtrack	The Lion King	Dangerous Minds; Forrest Gump
Merit
Tammy Wynette
