= American Music Awards of 1993 =

US television program

20th Annual American Music Awards
- Date: January 25, 1993
- Location: Shrine Auditorium, Los Angeles, California
- Country: United States
- Hosted by: Gloria Estefan; Bobby Brown; Wynonna Judd

Highlights
- Most awards: Mariah Carey, Michael Jackson, Reba McEntire, Billy Ray Cyrus, Pearl Jam, Kris Kross, Boyz II Men, Michael Bolton (2 each)
- Most nominations: Mariah Carey (6)

Television/radio coverage
- Network: ABC
- Runtime: 180 min.
- Produced by: Dick Clark Productions

The 20th Annual American Music Awards were held on January 25, 1993, at the Shrine Auditorium, in Los Angeles, California. The awards recognized the most popular artists and albums from the year 1992. It was hosted by Bobby Brown, Gloria Estefan and Wynonna Judd.

Mariah Carey was the most nominated artist of the night, with a total of six nominations. Michael Jackson and Michael Bolton both received the most wins with two each. Jackson was also awarded with the International Artist Award, and since he was the first artist awarded with the honor, Eddie Murphy announced its full name as the Michael Jackson International Artist Award.

== Performances ==
| Artist(s) | Song(s) |
|---|---|
| Michael Jackson | "Dangerous" |
| Gloria Estefan | Medley: "Dr. Beat" "Conga" "1-2-3" "Get on Your Feet" |
| Kris Kross | Medley: "Freak Da Funk" "Jump" "Warm It Up" "It's a Shame" |
| Reba McEntire; Vince Gill | "The Heart Won't Lie" |
| Boyz II Men | "End of the Road" |
| Michael Bolton | "To Love Somebody" "Drift Away" |
| Bobby Brown | "Get Away" |
| Wynonna Judd | "My Strongest Weakness" |
| Bon Jovi | "Bed of Roses" |
| Billy Ray Cyrus; Sly Dog | "She's Not Cryin' Anymore" |
| Stephen Stills | "Find the Cost of Freedom" |
| Metallica | "Wherever I May Roam" |

== Winners and nominees ==
| Subcategory | Winner | Nominees |
|---|---|---|
Pop/Rock Category
| Favorite Pop/Rock Male Artist | Michael Bolton | Bryan Adams; Eric Clapton; Michael Jackson |
| Favorite Pop/Rock Female Artist | Mariah Carey | Amy Grant; Bonnie Raitt; Vanessa Williams |
| Favorite Pop/Rock Band/Duo/Group | Genesis | Kris Kross; U2 |
| Favorite Pop/Rock Album | Dangerous – Michael Jackson | Totally Krossed Out – Kris Kross; Achtung Baby – U2 |
| Favorite Pop/Rock Song | "End of the Road" – Boyz II Men | "I'll Be There" – Mariah Carey "Under the Bridge" – Red Hot Chili Peppers |
| Favorite Pop/Rock New Artist | Pearl Jam | Arrested Development; TLC |
Soul/R&B Category
| Favorite Soul/R&B Male Artist | Bobby Brown | Tevin Campbell; Michael Jackson; Gerald Levert |
| Favorite Soul/R&B Female Artist | Patti LaBelle | Mary J. Blige; Mariah Carey; Vanessa L. Williams |
| Favorite Soul/R&B Band/Duo/Group | Boyz II Men | En Vogue; Jodeci |
| Favorite Soul/R&B Album | Funky Divas – En Vogue | Unplugged – Mariah Carey; Dangerous – Michael Jackson |
| Favorite Soul/R&B Song | "Remember the Time" – Michael Jackson | "Honey Love" – R. Kelly & Public Announcement "Somebody Loves You Baby (You Know Who It Is)" – Patti LaBelle |
| Favorite Soul/R&B New Artist | Kris Kross | Arrested Development; Jodeci |
Country Category
| Favorite Country Male Artist | Garth Brooks | Billy Ray Cyrus; Vince Gill; Alan Jackson |
| Favorite Country Female Artist | Reba McEntire | Lorrie Morgan; Tanya Tucker; Wynonna |
| Favorite Country Band/Duo/Group | Alabama | Brooks & Dunn; Sawyer Brown |
| Favorite Country Album | For My Broken Heart – Reba McEntire | The Chase – Garth Brooks; Some Gave All – Billy Ray Cyrus |
| Favorite Country Song | "Achy Breaky Heart" – Billy Ray Cyrus | "The River" – Garth Brooks "I Still Believe in You" – Vince Gill |
| Favorite Country New Artist | Billy Ray Cyrus | Brooks & Dunn; Wynonna |
Adult Contemporary Category
| Favorite Adult Contemporary Artist | Michael Bolton | Mariah Carey; Genesis |
| Favorite Adult Contemporary Album | Unplugged – Mariah Carey | We Can't Dance – Genesis; The Comfort Zone – Vanessa L. Williams |
| Favorite Adult Contemporary New Artist | k.d. lang | Jon Secada; Patty Smyth |
Heavy Metal/Hard Rock Category
| Favorite Heavy Metal/Hard Rock Artist | Metallica | Def Leppard; Red Hot Chili Peppers |
| Favorite Heavy Metal/Hard Rock New Artist | Pearl Jam | Mr. Big; Ugly Kid Joe |
Rap/Hip-Hop Category
| Favorite Rap/Hip-Hop Artist | Sir Mix-A-Lot | Kris Kross; TLC |
| Favorite Rap/Hip-Hop New Artist | Kris Kross | Arrested Development; TLC |
Merit
Bill Graham
International Artist Award
Michael Jackson
