= American Music Awards of 1998 =

US television program

25th Annual American Music Awards
- Date: January 26, 1998
- Location: Shrine Auditorium, Los Angeles, California
- Country: United States
- Hosted by: Drew Carey
- Most awards: Spice Girls (3)
- Most nominations: Puff Daddy (5)

Television/radio coverage
- Network: ABC
- Runtime: 180 min.
- Produced by: Dick Clark Productions

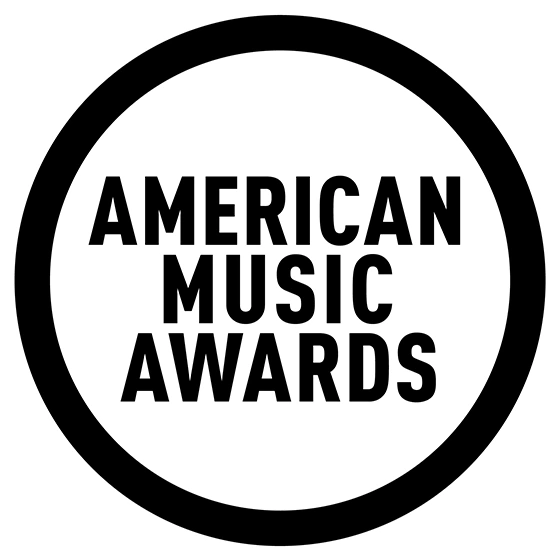
American Music Awards logo since 2019

The 25th Annual American Music Awards were held on January 26, 1998, at the Shrine Auditorium, in Los Angeles, California. The awards recognized the most popular artists and albums from the year 1997.

The Spice Girls were the biggest winners of the night, winning all of the three awards they were nominated for, while Puff Daddy didn't win any of the five awards he had been nominated for.

== Performances ==
Artist(s)	Song(s)
Janet Jackson	"Together Again" (DJ Premier Remix)
Matchbox Twenty	"Push"
Trisha Yearwood	"How Do I Live"
Spice Girls	"Too Much"^{[a]}
Boyz II Men	"A Song for Mama"
Drew Carey "Weird Al" Yankovic; Those Darn Accordions	American Music Awards Medley
Enrique Iglesias	"Lluvia cae"
Garth Brooks	"Rollin'"
Mariah Carey	"My All" (via satellite from Tokyo Dome in Tokyo)
Mary J. Blige; George Benson	"Seven Days"
Michael Bolton	"Nessun dorma"
Puff Daddy; Mase	"It's All About the Benjamins" "Mo Money Mo Problems"
Reba McEntire	"What If"

Notes

- ^{^[a]} Pre-taped in Los Angeles on January 21st.

== Winners and nominees ==
Subcategory	Winner	Nominees
Pop/Rock Category
Favorite Pop/Rock Male Artist	Babyface	Beck; Puff Daddy
Favorite Pop/Rock Female Artist	Celine Dion	Toni Braxton; Jewel
Favorite Pop/Rock Band/Duo/Group	Spice Girls	U2; The Wallflowers
Favorite Pop/Rock Album	Spice - Spice Girls	Pieces of You - Jewel; Yourself or Someone Like You - Matchbox 20; Bringing Down the Horse - The Wallflowers
Favorite Pop/Rock New Artist	Spice Girls	Matchbox 20; The Wallflowers
Soul/R&B Category
Favorite Soul/R&B Male Artist	Babyface	Puff Daddy; Keith Sweat
Favorite Soul/R&B Female Artist	Mariah Carey	Mary J. Blige; Toni Braxton
Favorite Soul/R&B Band/Duo/Group	Boyz II Men	Dru Hill; En Vogue
Favorite Soul/R&B Album	Share My World - Mary J. Blige	Baduizm - Erykah Badu; Another Level - Blackstreet; No Way Out - Puff Daddy
Favorite Soul/R&B New Artist	Erykah Badu	Dru Hill; Puff Daddy
Country Category
Favorite Country Male Artist	George Strait	Clint Black; Alan Jackson
Favorite Country Female Artist	Reba McEntire	LeAnn Rimes; Shania Twain
Favorite Country Band/Duo/Group	Alabama	Brooks & Dunn; Sawyer Brown
Favorite Country Album	Carrying Your Love with Me - George Strait	Everywhere - Tim McGraw; Unchained Melody: The Early Years - LeAnn Rimes (Songbook) A Collection of Hits - Trisha Yearwood
Favorite Country New Artist	Lee Ann Womack	Bob Carlisle; Kevin Sharp
Adult Contemporary Category
Favorite Adult Contemporary Artist	Elton John	Michael Bolton; Celine Dion
Alternative Category
Favorite Alternative Artist	Bush	Mighty Mighty Bosstones; Sublime
Rap/Hip-Hop Category
Favorite Rap/Hip-Hop Artist	Bone Thugs-N-Harmony	Puff Daddy; Wu-Tang Clan
Latin Category
Favorite Latin Artist	Julio Iglesias	Enrique Iglesias; Luis Miguel
Soundtrack Category
Favorite Soundtrack	Men in Black	Evita; The Preacher's Wife
Merit
Frank Sinatra
