= American Music Award for Favorite Country Band/Duo/Group =

American Music Award

American Music Awards for Favorite Country Band/Duo/Group
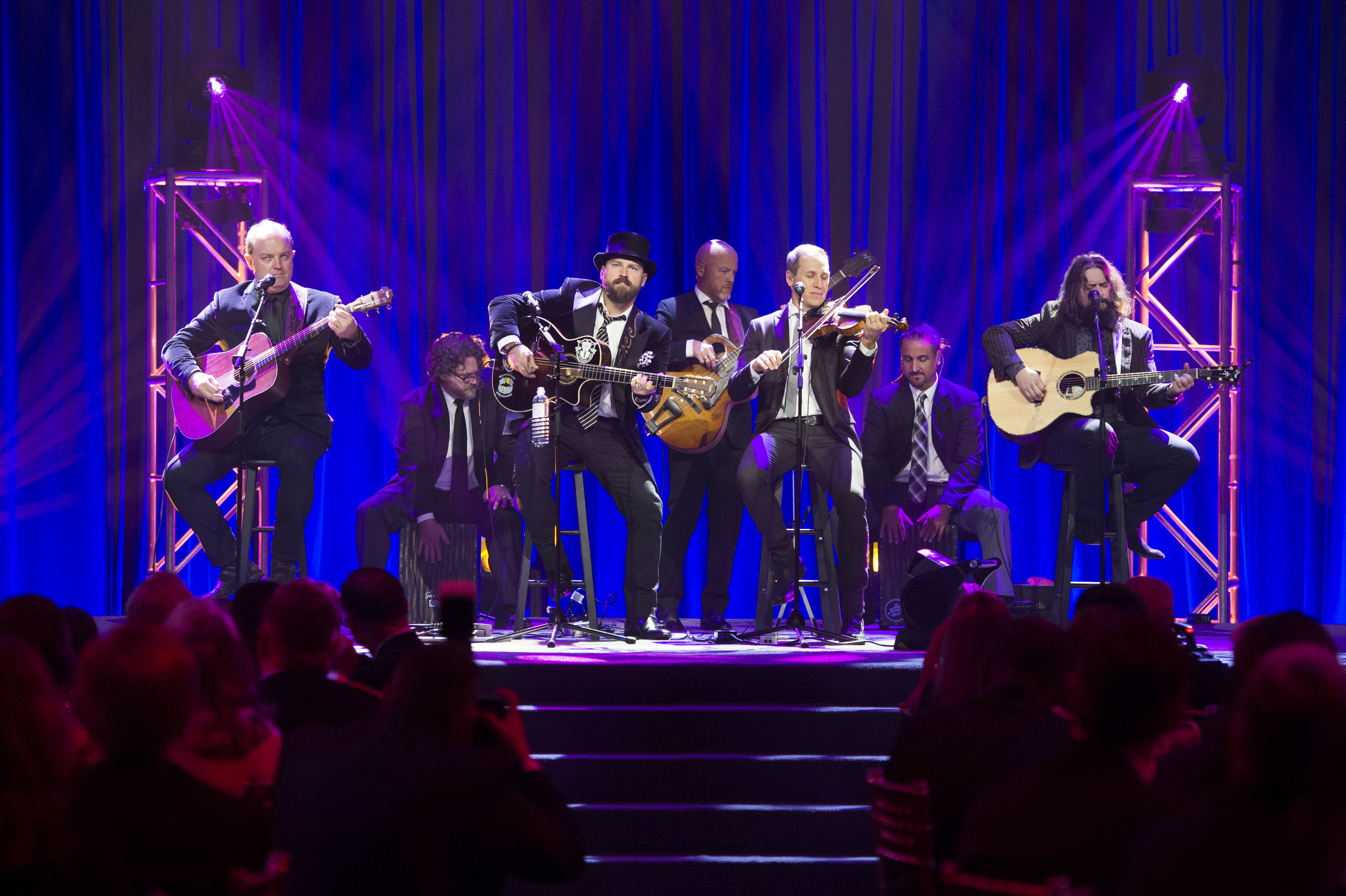
- Zac Brown Band are the most recent recipients
- Country: United States
- Presented by: American Music Awards
- First award: 1974
- Currently held by: Zac Brown Band

Highlights
- Most wins: Alabama (17)
- Most nominations: Alabama (18)
- Website: theamas.com

The American Music Award for Favorite Duo or Group – Country has been awarded since 1974. Years reflect the year in which the awards were presented, for works released in the previous year (until 2003 onward when awards were handed out on November of the same year). The all-time winner in this category is Alabama with 17 wins.

== Winners and nominees ==
=== 1970s ===
Year	Artist	Ref
1974 (1st)
1974 (1st)	Carter Family	
1974 (1st)	The Osborne Brothers	
1974 (1st)	The Statler Brothers	
1975 (2nd)
1975 (2nd)	Conway Twitty and Loretta Lynn	
1975 (2nd)	George Jones and Tammy Wynette	
1975 (2nd)	The Statler Brothers	
1976 (3rd)
1976 (3rd)	Donny Osmond and Marie Osmond	
1976 (3rd)	The Statler Brothers	
1976 (3rd)	Conway Twitty and Loretta Lynn	
1977 (4th)
1977 (4th)	Conway Twitty and Loretta Lynn	
1977 (4th)	George Jones and Tammy Wynette	
1977 (4th)	The Statler Brothers	
1978 (5th)
1978 (5th)	Conway Twitty and Loretta Lynn	
1978 (5th)	George Jones and Tammy Wynette	
1978 (5th)	The Statler Brothers	
1979 (6th)
1979 (6th)	The Statler Brothers	
1979 (6th)	Waylon Jennings and Willie Nelson	
1979 (6th)	The Oak Ridge Boys	

=== 1980s ===
Year	Artist	Ref
1980 (7th)
1980 (7th)	The Statler Brothers	
1980 (7th)	The Oak Ridge Boys	
1980 (7th)	Kenny Rogers and Dottie West	
1981 (8th)
1981 (8th)	The Statler Brothers	
1981 (8th)	Charlie Daniels Band	
1981 (8th)	The Oak Ridge Boys	
1982 (9th)
1982 (9th)	The Oak Ridge Boys	
1982 (9th)	Alabama	
1982 (9th)	Willie Nelson and Ray Price	
1982 (9th)	The Statler Brothers	
1983 (10th)
1983 (10th)	Alabama	
1983 (10th)	The Oak Ridge Boys	
1983 (10th)	The Statler Brothers	
1984 (11th)
1984 (11th)	Alabama	
1984 (11th)	The Oak Ridge Boys	
1984 (11th)	Kenny Rogers and Dolly Parton	
1984 (11th)	The Statler Brothers	
1985 (12th)
1985 (12th)	Alabama	
1985 (12th)	The Oak Ridge Boys	
1985 (12th)	The Statler Brothers	
1986 (13th)
1986 (13th)	Alabama	
1986 (13th)	The Judds	
1986 (13th)	The Oak Ridge Boys	
1987 (14th)
1987 (14th)	Alabama	
1987 (14th)	The Forester Sisters	
1987 (14th)	The Judds	
1987 (14th)	Marie Osmond and Paul Davis	
1988 (15th)
1988 (15th)	Alabama	
1988 (15th)	The Judds	
1988 (15th)	Restless Heart	
1989 (16th)
1989 (16th)	Alabama	
1989 (16th)	The Judds	
1989 (16th)	The Oak Ridge Boys	

=== 1990s ===
Year	Artist	Ref
1990 (17th)
1990 (17th)	Alabama	
1990 (17th)	Highway 101	
1990 (17th)	The Judds	
1991 (18th)
1991 (18th)	Alabama	
1991 (18th)	The Judds	
1991 (18th)	Shenandoah	
1992 (19th)
1992 (19th)	Alabama	
1992 (19th)	The Judds	
1992 (19th)	The Kentucky Headhunters	
1993 (20th)
1993 (20th)	Alabama	
1993 (20th)	Brooks & Dunn	
1993 (20th)	Sawyer Brown	
1994 (21st)
1994 (21st)	Alabama	
1994 (21st)	Brooks & Dunn	
1994 (21st)	Little Texas	
1995 (22nd)
1995 (22nd)	Alabama	
1995 (22nd)	Brooks & Dunn	
1995 (22nd)	Little Texas	
1996 (23rd)
1996 (23rd)	Alabama	
1996 (23rd)	BlackHawk	
1996 (23rd)	Brooks & Dunn	
1997 (24th)
1997 (24th)	Brooks & Dunn	
1997 (24th)	BlackHawk	
1997 (24th)	The Mavericks	
1998 (25th)
1998 (25th)	Alabama	
1998 (25th)	Brooks & Dunn	
1998 (25th)	Sawyer Brown	
1999 (26th)
1999 (26th)	Alabama	
1999 (26th)	Brooks & Dunn	
1999 (26th)	Dixie Chicks	

=== 2000s ===
Year	Artist	Ref
2000 (27th)
2000 (27th)	Brooks & Dunn	
2000 (27th)	Diamond Rio	
2000 (27th)	Dixie Chicks	
2001 (28th)
2001 (28th)	Dixie Chicks	
2001 (28th)	Brooks & Dunn	
2001 (28th)	Lonestar	
2002 (29th)
2002 (29th)	Brooks & Dunn	
2002 (29th)	Lonestar	
2002 (29th)	SheDaisy	
2003 (30th)
2003 (30th)	Dixie Chicks	
2003 (30th)	Brooks & Dunn	
2003 (30th)	Lonestar	
2003 (31st)
2003 (31st)	Alabama	
2003 (31st)	Brooks & Dunn	
2003 (31st)	Dixie Chicks	
2004 (32nd)
2004 (32nd)	Brooks & Dunn	
2004 (32nd)	Lonestar	
2004 (32nd)	Rascal Flatts	
2005 (33rd)
2005 (33rd)	Brooks & Dunn	
2005 (33rd)	Big & Rich	
2005 (33rd)	Rascal Flatts	
2006 (34th)
2006 (34th)	Rascal Flatts	
2006 (34th)	Brooks & Dunn	
2006 (34th)	Montgomery Gentry	
2007 (35th)
2007 (35th)	Rascal Flatts	
2007 (35th)	Big & Rich	
2007 (35th)	Brooks & Dunn	
2008 (36th)
2008 (36th)	Rascal Flatts	
2008 (36th)	Brooks & Dunn	
2008 (36th)	Sugarland	
2009 (37th)
2009 (37th)	Rascal Flatts	
2009 (37th)	Sugarland	
2009 (37th)	Zac Brown Band	

=== 2010s ===
Year	Artist	Ref
2010 (38th)
2010 (38th)	Lady Antebellum	
2010 (38th)	Rascal Flatts	
2010 (38th)	Zac Brown Band	
2011 (39th)
2011 (39th)	Lady Antebellum	
2011 (39th)	The Band Perry	
2011 (39th)	Zac Brown Band	
2012 (40th)
2012 (40th)	Lady Antebellum	
2012 (40th)	Rascal Flatts	
2012 (40th)	Zac Brown Band	
2013 (41st)
2013 (41st)	Lady Antebellum	
2013 (41st)	The Band Perry	
2013 (41st)	Florida Georgia Line	
2014 (42nd)
2014 (42nd)	Florida Georgia Line	
2014 (42nd)	Eli Young Band	
2014 (42nd)	Lady Antebellum	
2015 (43rd)
2015 (43rd)	Florida Georgia Line	
2015 (43rd)	Little Big Town	
2015 (43rd)	Zac Brown Band	
2016 (44th)
2016 (44th)	Florida Georgia Line	
2016 (44th)	Old Dominion	
2016 (44th)	Zac Brown Band	
2017 (45th)
2017 (45th)	Little Big Town	
2017 (45th)	Florida Georgia Line	
2017 (45th)	Old Dominion	
2018 (46th)
2018 (46th)	Florida Georgia Line	
2018 (46th)	Dan + Shay	
2018 (46th)	Lanco	
2019 (47th)
2019 (47th)	Dan + Shay	
2019 (47th)	Florida Georgia Line	
2019 (47th)	Old Dominion	

=== 2020s ===
Year	Artist	Ref
2020 (48th)
2020 (48th)	Dan + Shay	
2020 (48th)	Florida Georgia Line	
2020 (48th)	Old Dominion	
2021 (49th)
2021 (49th)	Dan + Shay	
2021 (49th)	Florida Georgia Line	
2021 (49th)	Lady A	
2021 (49th)	Old Dominion	
2021 (49th)	Zac Brown Band	
2022 (50th)	Dan + Shay	
2022 (50th)	Lady A	
2022 (50th)	Old Dominion	
2022 (50th)	Parmalee	
2022 (50th)	Zac Brown Band	
2025 (51st)	Dan + Shay	
2025 (51st)	Old Dominion	
2025 (51st)	Parmalee	
2025 (51st)	The Red Clay Strays	
2025 (51st)	Zac Brown Band	
2026 (52nd)	Zac Brown Band	
2026 (52nd)	Brooks & Dunn	
2026 (52nd)	Old Dominion	
2026 (52nd)	Rascal Flatts	
2026 (52nd)	Treaty Oak Revival	

== Category facts ==
=== Multiple wins ===
17 wins

- Alabama

5 wins

- Brooks & Dunn
- Dan + Shay

4 wins

- Florida Georgia Line
- Lady Antebellum
- Rascal Flatts

3 wins

- The Statler Brothers
- Conway Twitty and Loretta Lynn

2 wins

- Dixie Chicks

=== Multiple nominations ===
18 nominations

- Alabama
- Brooks & Dunn

12 nominations

- The Statler Brothers

9 nominations

- Florida Georgia Line
- The Oak Ridge Boys
- Rascal Flatts
- Zac Brown Band

7 nominations

- The Judds
- Lady Antebellum
- Old Dominion

5 nominations

- Dan + Shay
- Dixie Chicks

4 nominations

- Conway Twitty and Loretta Lynn
- Lonestar

3 nominations

- George Jones and Tammy Wynette

2 nominations

- The Band Perry
- Big & Rich
- BlackHawk
- Little Big Town
- Little Texas
- Willie Nelson (1 w/ Waylon Jennings and 1 w/ Ray Price)
- Marie Osmond (1 w/ Donny Osmond and 1 w/ Paul Davis)
- Kenny Rogers (1 w/ Dolly Parton and 1 w/ Dottie West)
- Sawyer Brown
- Sugarland
