= American Music Award for Favorite Country Female Artist =

American Music Award

American Music Awards for Favorite Country Female Artist
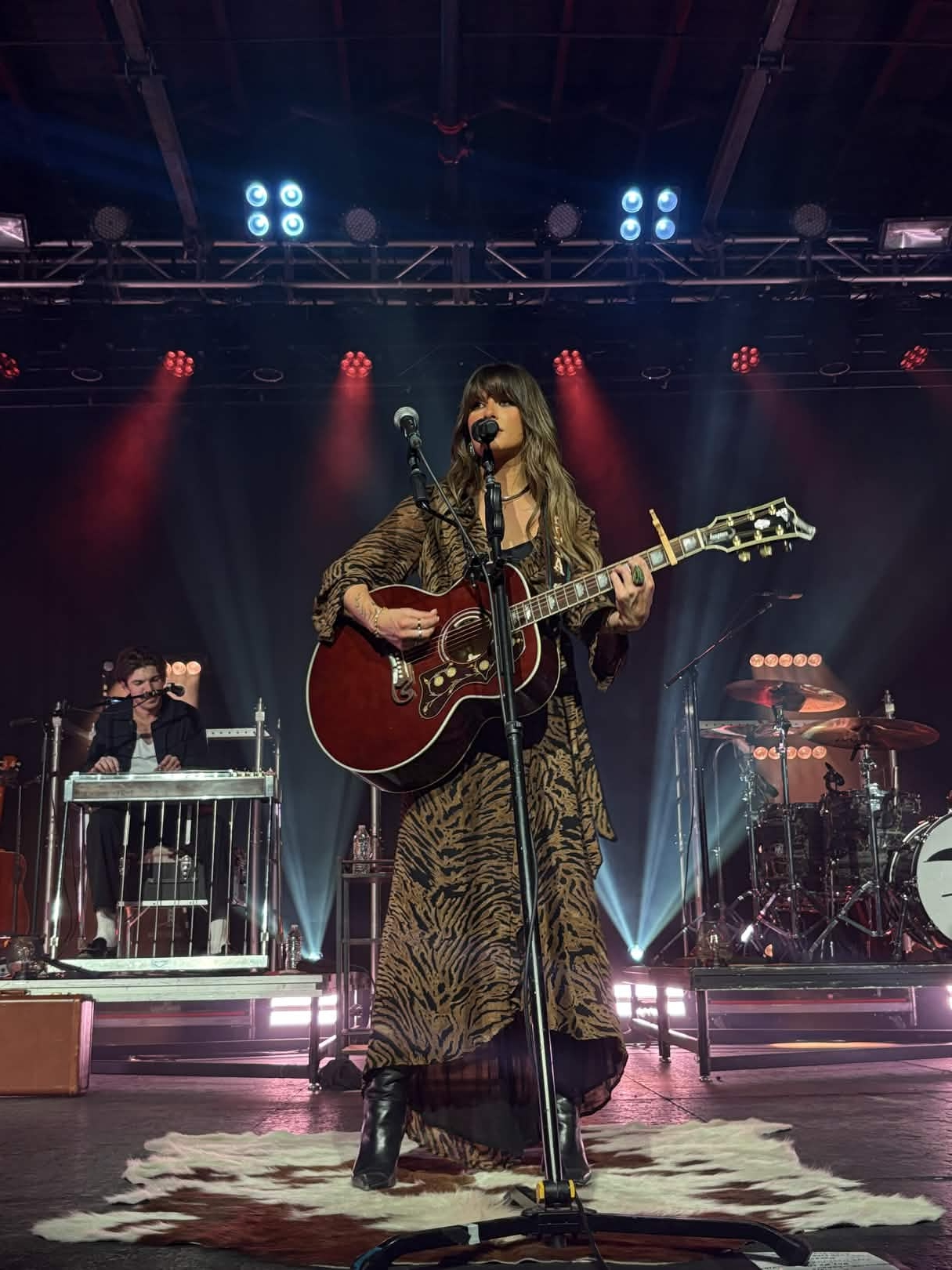
- Ella Langley is the most recent recipient
- Country: United States
- Presented by: American Music Awards
- First award: 1974
- Currently held by: Ella Langley

Highlights
- Most wins: Reba McEntire (11)
- Most nominations: Reba McEntire (15)
- Website: theamas.com

The American Music Award for Favorite Female Artist – Country has been awarded since 1974. Years reflect the year in which the awards were presented, for works released in the previous year (until 2003 onward when awards were handed out on November of the same year). The all-time winner in this category is Reba McEntire with 11 wins stretching across three decades. McEntire was also the first woman to win the award eight years in a row.

== Winners and nominees ==
=== 1970s ===
Year	Artist	Ref
1974 (1st)	Lynn Anderson	
1974 (1st)	Loretta Lynn	
1974 (1st)	Tammy Wynette	
1975 (2nd)
1975 (2nd)	Olivia Newton-John	
1975 (2nd)	Loretta Lynn	
1975 (2nd)	Marie Osmond	
1976 (3rd)
1976 (3rd)	Olivia Newton-John	
1976 (3rd)	Loretta Lynn	
1976 (3rd)	Linda Ronstadt	
1977 (4th)
1977 (4th)	Loretta Lynn	
1977 (4th)	Dolly Parton	
1977 (4th)	Tanya Tucker	
1978 (5th)
1978 (5th)	Loretta Lynn	
1978 (5th)	Crystal Gayle	
1978 (5th)	Dolly Parton	
1979 (6th)
1979 (6th)	Crystal Gayle	
1979 (6th)	Loretta Lynn	
1979 (6th)	Linda Ronstadt	

=== 1980s ===
Year	Artist	Ref
1980 (7th)	Crystal Gayle	
1980 (7th)	Barbara Mandrell	
1980 (7th)	Dolly Parton	
1981 (8th)
1981 (8th)	Barbara Mandrell	
1981 (8th)	Crystal Gayle	
1981 (8th)	Anne Murray	
1982 (9th)
1982 (9th)	Anne Murray	
1982 (9th)	Emmylou Harris	
1982 (9th)	Barbara Mandrell	
1982 (9th)	Dolly Parton	
1983 (10th)
1983 (10th)	Barbara Mandrell	
1983 (10th)	Emmylou Harris	
1983 (10th)	Sylvia	
1984 (11th)
1984 (11th)	Barbara Mandrell	
1984 (11th)	Janie Fricke	
1984 (11th)	Crystal Gayle	
1984 (11th)	Sylvia	
1985 (12th)
1985 (12th)	Barbara Mandrell	
1985 (12th)	Anne Murray	
1985 (12th)	Dolly Parton	
1986 (13th)
1986 (13th)	Crystal Gayle	
1986 (13th)	Anne Murray	
1986 (13th)	Dolly Parton	
1987 (14th)
1987 (14th)	Barbara Mandrell	
1987 (14th)	Reba McEntire	
1987 (14th)	Juice Newton	
1987 (14th)	Tanya Tucker	
1988 (15th)
1988 (15th)	Reba McEntire	
1988 (15th)	Rosanne Cash	
1988 (15th)	Tanya Tucker	
1989 (16th)
1989 (16th)	Reba McEntire	
1989 (16th)	Rosanne Cash	
1989 (16th)	Tanya Tucker	

=== 1990s ===
Year	Artist	Ref
1990 (17th)	Reba McEntire	
1990 (17th)	K. T. Oslin	
1990 (17th)	Dolly Parton	
1991 (18th)
1991 (18th)	Reba McEntire	
1991 (18th)	Patty Loveless	
1991 (18th)	Kathy Mattea	
1991 (18th)	Lorrie Morgan	
1991 (18th)	K. T. Oslin	
1992 (19th)
1992 (19th)	Reba McEntire	
1992 (19th)	Kathy Mattea	
1992 (19th)	Dolly Parton	
1993 (20th)
1993 (20th)	Reba McEntire	
1993 (20th)	Wynonna Judd	
1993 (20th)	Lorrie Morgan	
1993 (20th)	Tanya Tucker	
1994 (21st)
1994 (21st)	Reba McEntire	
1994 (21st)	Mary Chapin Carpenter	
1994 (21st)	Wynonna Judd	
1994 (21st)	Dolly Parton	
1995 (22nd)
1995 (22nd)	Reba McEntire	
1995 (22nd)	Mary Chapin Carpenter	
1995 (22nd)	Lorrie Morgan	
1996 (23rd)
1996 (23rd)	Reba McEntire	
1996 (23rd)	Mary Chapin Carpenter	
1996 (23rd)	Shania Twain	
1997 (24th)
1997 (24th)	Shania Twain	
1997 (24th)	Faith Hill	
1997 (24th)	Wynonna Judd	
1998 (25th)
1998 (25th)	Reba McEntire	
1998 (25th)	LeAnn Rimes	
1998 (25th)	Shania Twain	
1999 (26th)
1999 (26th)	Shania Twain	
1999 (26th)	Faith Hill	
1999 (26th)	LeAnn Rimes	

=== 2000s ===
Year	Artist	Ref
2000 (27th)	Shania Twain	
2000 (27th)	Faith Hill	
2000 (27th)	Martina McBride	
2001 (28th)
2001 (28th)	Faith Hill	
2001 (28th)	Martina McBride	
2001 (28th)	Reba McEntire	
2002 (29th)
2002 (29th)	Faith Hill	
2002 (29th)	Sara Evans	
2002 (29th)	Jo Dee Messina	
2003 (30th)
2003 (30th)	Martina McBride	
2003 (30th)	Jo Dee Messina	
2003 (30th)	Lee Ann Womack	
2003 (31st)
2003 (31st)	Faith Hill	
2003 (31st)	Martina McBride	
2003 (31st)	Shania Twain	
2004 (32nd)
2004 (32nd)	Reba McEntire	
2004 (32nd)	Martina McBride	
2004 (32nd)	Gretchen Wilson	
2005 (33rd)
2005 (33rd)	Gretchen Wilson	
2005 (33rd)	Martina McBride	
2005 (33rd)	LeAnn Rimes	
2006 (34th)
2006 (34th)	Faith Hill	
2006 (34th)	Carrie Underwood	
2006 (34th)	Gretchen Wilson	
2007 (35th)
2007 (35th)	Carrie Underwood	
2007 (35th)	Martina McBride	
2007 (35th)	Taylor Swift	
2008 (36th)
2008 (36th)	Taylor Swift	
2008 (36th)	Reba McEntire	
2008 (36th)	Carrie Underwood	
2009 (37th)
2009 (37th)	Taylor Swift	
2009 (37th)	Reba McEntire	
2009 (37th)	Carrie Underwood	

=== 2010s ===
Year	Artist	Ref
2010 (38th)	Taylor Swift	
2010 (38th)	Miranda Lambert	
2010 (38th)	Carrie Underwood	
2011 (39th)
2011 (39th)	Taylor Swift	
2011 (39th)	Sara Evans	
2011 (39th)	Miranda Lambert	
2012 (40th)
2012 (40th)	Taylor Swift	
2012 (40th)	Miranda Lambert	
2012 (40th)	Carrie Underwood	
2013 (41st)
2013 (41st)	Taylor Swift	
2013 (41st)	Miranda Lambert	
2013 (41st)	Carrie Underwood	
2014 (42nd)
2014 (42nd)	Carrie Underwood	
2014 (42nd)	Miranda Lambert	
2014 (42nd)	Kacey Musgraves	
2015 (43rd)
2015 (43rd)	Carrie Underwood	
2015 (43rd)	Kelsea Ballerini	
2015 (43rd)	Miranda Lambert	
2016 (44th)
2016 (44th)	Carrie Underwood	
2016 (44th)	Kelsea Ballerini	
2016 (44th)	Cam	
2017 (45th)
2017 (45th)	Carrie Underwood	
2017 (45th)	Miranda Lambert	
2017 (45th)	Maren Morris	
2018 (46th)
2018 (46th)	Carrie Underwood	
2018 (46th)	Kelsea Ballerini	
2018 (46th)	Maren Morris	
2019 (47th)
2019 (47th)	Carrie Underwood	
2019 (47th)	Kelsea Ballerini	
2019 (47th)	Maren Morris	

=== 2020s ===
Year	Artist	Ref
2020 (48th)
2020 (48th)	Maren Morris	
2020 (48th)	Gabby Barrett	
2020 (48th)	Miranda Lambert	
2021 (49th)
2021 (49th)	Carrie Underwood	
2021 (49th)	Kacey Musgraves	
2021 (49th)	Gabby Barrett	
2021 (49th)	Maren Morris	
2021 (49th)	Miranda Lambert	
2022 (50th)
2022 (50th)	Taylor Swift	
2022 (50th)	Miranda Lambert	
2022 (50th)	Maren Morris	
2022 (50th)	Carrie Underwood	
2022 (50th)	Lainey Wilson	
2025 (51st)
2025 (51st)	Beyoncé	
2025 (51st)	Ella Langley	
2025 (51st)	Megan Moroney	
2025 (51st)	Kacey Musgraves	
2025 (51st)	Lainey Wilson	
2026 (52nd)
2026 (52nd)	Ella Langley	
2026 (52nd)	Kelsea Ballerini	
2026 (52nd)	Miranda Lambert	
2026 (52nd)	Megan Moroney	
2026 (52nd)	Lainey Wilson	

== Category facts ==
=== Multiple wins ===
11 wins

- Reba McEntire

8 wins

- Carrie Underwood

7 wins

- Taylor Swift

5 wins

- Barbara Mandrell

4 wins

- Faith Hill

3 wins

- Crystal Gayle
- Shania Twain

2 wins

- Loretta Lynn
- Olivia Newton-John

=== Multiple nominations ===
15 nominations

- Reba McEntire
- Carrie Underwood

11 nominations

- Miranda Lambert

9 nominations

- Dolly Parton

8 nominations

- Taylor Swift

7 nominations

- Faith Hill
- Barbara Mandrell
- Martina McBride

6 nominations

- Crystal Gayle
- Loretta Lynn
- Maren Morris
- Shania Twain

5 nominations

- Kelsea Ballerini
- Tanya Tucker

4 nominations

- Anne Murray

3 nominations

- Mary Chapin Carpenter
- Wynonna Judd
- Lorrie Morgan
- Kacey Musgraves
- LeAnn Rimes
- Gretchen Wilson
- Lainey Wilson

2 nominations

- Gabby Barrett
- Rosanne Cash
- Sara Evans
- Emmylou Harris
- Ella Langley
- Kathy Mattea
- Jo Dee Messina
- Megan Moroney
- Olivia Newton-John
- K. T. Oslin
- Linda Ronstadt
- Sylvia

== See also ==
- List of music awards honoring women
