= American Music Awards of 1985 =

US television program

12th Annual American Music Awards
- Date: January 28, 1985
- Venue: Shrine Auditorium, Los Angeles, California
- Country: United States
- Hosted by: Lionel Richie

Highlights
- Most awards: Lionel Richie (6)
- Most nominations: Prince (8)

Television/radio coverage
- Network: ABC
- Runtime: 180 min.
- Produced by: Dick Clark Productions

The 12th Annual American Music Awards were held on January 28, 1985. This award ceremony was notable as immediately following the event, many of the celebrities participating in the event went to record "We Are the World".

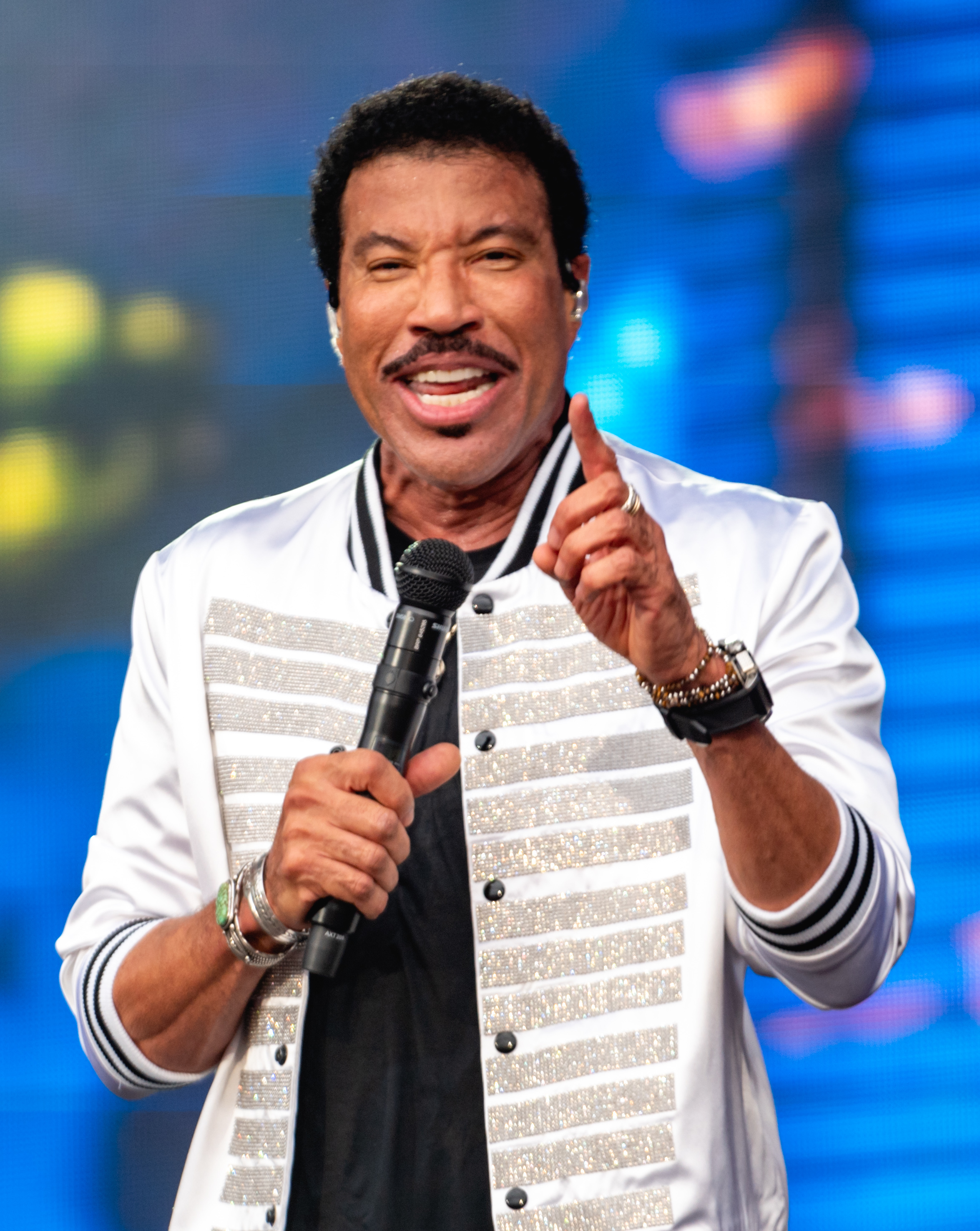
Lionel Richie served as the host of the event, and also won 6 awards.

== Performances ==
Artist(s)	Song(s)
Lionel Richie	"Running with the Night"
Daryl Hall & John Oates	"Method of Modern Love"
Cyndi Lauper	"When You Were Mine"
Alabama	"There’s No Way"
Tina Turner	"Private Dancer"
Culture Club	"Mistake Number 3" (via satellite from London)
Sheila E	"The Glamorous Life"
Kenny Rogers	"Crazy"
Conway Twitty; Loretta Lynn	"Louisiana Woman, Mississippi Man"
Lionel Richie	"Hello"
Julian Lennon	"Too Late for Goodbyes"
The Pointer Sisters	Medley: "I’m So Excited" "Automatic" "Neutron Dance" "Fire" "Slow Hand" "He’s So Shy" "Jump (For My Love)"
Waylon Jennings	"Waltz Me to Heaven"
Prince & The Revolution	"Purple Rain"
Lionel Richie; All artists	"Let it Be"

== Winners and nominees ==
Subcategory	Winner	Nominees
Pop/Rock Categories
Favorite Pop/Rock Male Artist	Lionel Richie	Prince; Bruce Springsteen
Favorite Pop/Rock Female Artist	Cyndi Lauper	Madonna; Linda Ronstadt
Favorite Pop/Rock Band/Duo/Group	Daryl Hall & John Oates	Huey Lewis and the News; Van Halen
Favorite Pop/Rock Album	Purple Rain - Prince	Thriller - Michael Jackson; Can't Slow Down - Lionel Richie
Favorite Pop/Rock Song	"Dancing In The Dark" - Bruce Springsteen	"When Doves Cry" - Prince "What's Love Got To Do With It" - Tina Turner
Favorite Pop/Rock Video	"Hello" - Lionel Richie	"Ghostbusters" - Ray Parker Jr. "When Doves Cry" - Prince
Favorite Pop/Rock Male Video Artist	Lionel Richie	Prince; Bruce Springsteen
Favorite Pop/Rock Female Video Artist	Cyndi Lauper	Laura Branigan; Tina Turner
Favorite Pop/Rock Band/Duo/Group Video Artist	Huey Lewis and the News	Culture Club; Duran Duran
Soul/R&B Categories
Favorite Soul/R&B Male Artist	Lionel Richie	Michael Jackson; Prince
Favorite Soul/R&B Female Artist	Tina Turner	Sheila E. Chaka Khan
Favorite Soul/R&B Band/Duo/Group	The Pointer Sisters	The Jacksons; Kool & The Gang
Favorite Soul/R&B Album	Purple Rain - Prince	Thriller - Michael Jackson; Can't Slow Down - Lionel Richie
Favorite Soul/R&B Song	"When Doves Cry" - Prince	"Caribbean Queen (No More Love on the Run)" - Billy Ocean "What's Love Got To Do With It" - Tina Turner
Favorite Soul/R&B Video	"Hello" - Lionel Richie	"Ghostbusters" - Ray Parker Jr. "When Doves Cry" - Prince
Favorite Soul/R&B Male Video Artist	Lionel Richie	Ray Parker Jr. Prince
Favorite Soul/R&B Female Video Artist	Tina Turner	Sheila E. Chaka Khan
Favorite Soul/R&B Band/Duo/Group Video Artist	The Pointer Sisters	Kool & The Gang; The Time
Country Categories
Favorite Country Male Artist	Kenny Rogers	Ricky Skaggs; Hank Williams, Jr.
Favorite Country Female Artist	Barbara Mandrell	Anne Murray; Dolly Parton
Favorite Country Band/Duo/Group	Alabama	The Oak Ridge Boys; The Statler Brothers
Favorite Country Album	Eyes That See in the Dark - Kenny Rogers	Roll On - Alabama; Don't Cheat in Our Hometown - Ricky Skaggs
Favorite Country Song	"Islands in the Stream" - Kenny Rogers & Dolly Parton	"Mama He's Crazy" - The Judds "A Little Good News" - Anne Murray
Favorite Country Video	"A Little Good News" - Anne Murray	"Tougher Than Leather" - Willie Nelson "Elizabeth" - The Statler Brothers
Favorite Country Male Video Artist	Willie Nelson	Waylon Jennings; Hank Williams, Jr.
Favorite Country Female Video Artist	Anne Murray	Gus Hardin; Charly McClain
Favorite Country Band/Duo/Group Video Artist	The Oak Ridge Boys	The Statler Brothers; Hank Williams, Jr. & Waylon Jennings
Merit
Loretta Lynn
