= American Music Awards of 1997 =

US television program

24th Annual American Music Awards
- Date: January 27, 1997
- Location: Shrine Auditorium, Los Angeles, California
- Country: United States
- Hosted by: Sinbad
- Most awards: Whitney Houston, Alanis Morissette and Toni Braxton (2 each)
- Most nominations: Mariah Carey (5)

Television/radio coverage
- Network: ABC
- Runtime: 180 min.
- Produced by: Dick Clark Productions

The 24th Annual American Music Awards were held on January 27, 1997, at the Shrine Auditorium, in Los Angeles, California. The awards recognized the most popular artists and albums from the year 1996.

== Performances ==
Artist(s)	Song(s)
Toni Braxton	"Un-Break My Heart" (Soul Hex Anthem Vocal) "You're Makin' Me High"
Brooks & Dunn	"A Man This Lonely"
Bush	"Greedy Fly"
Alan Jackson	"Everything I Love"
Little Richard	"Good Golly Miss Molly"
Metallica	"King Nothing"
Mötley Crüe	"Shout at the Devil"
Nas	"Street Dreams" "If I Ruled the World (Imagine That)"
New Edition	"I'm Still in Love with You"
LeAnn Rimes	"Unchained Melody"
Rod Stewart	"If We Fall In Love Tonight"
Keith Sweat	"Nobody"

== Winners and nominees ==
Subcategory	Winner	Nominees
Pop/Rock Category
Favorite Pop/Rock Male Artist	Eric Clapton	Bryan Adams; Seal
Favorite Pop/Rock Female Artist	Alanis Morissette	Mariah Carey; Celine Dion
Favorite Pop/Rock Band/Duo/Group	Hootie & the Blowfish	Fugees; Dave Matthews Band
Favorite Pop/Rock Album	Jagged Little Pill – Alanis Morissette	Anthology – The Beatles; Daydream – Mariah Carey
Favorite Pop/Rock New Artist	Jewel	Donna Lewis; No Doubt
Soul/R&B Category
Favorite Soul/R&B Male Artist	Keith Sweat	D'Angelo; R. Kelly
Favorite Soul/R&B Female Artist	Toni Braxton	Brandy; Mariah Carey
Favorite Soul/R&B Band/Duo/Group	New Edition	Fugees; TLC
Favorite Soul/R&B Album	Secrets – Toni Braxton	Daydream – Mariah Carey; Keith Sweat – Keith Sweat
Favorite Soul/R&B New Artist	D'Angelo	Deborah Cox; Tony Rich Project
Country Category
Favorite Country Male Artist	Garth Brooks	Alan Jackson; George Strait
Favorite Country Female Artist	Shania Twain	Faith Hill; Wynonna
Favorite Country Band/Duo/Group	Brooks & Dunn	BlackHawk; The Mavericks
Favorite Country Album	Blue Clear Sky – George Strait	Fresh Horses – Garth Brooks; The Woman in Me – Shania Twain
Favorite Country New Artist	LeAnn Rimes	Terri Clark; Mindy McCready
Adult Contemporary Category
Favorite Adult Contemporary Artist	Whitney Houston	Mariah Carey; Celine Dion
Alternative Category
Favorite Alternative Artist	The Smashing Pumpkins	Bush; Stone Temple Pilots
Heavy Metal/Hard Rock Category
Favorite Heavy Metal/Hard Rock Artist	Metallica	The Smashing Pumpkins; Stone Temple Pilots
Rap/Hip-Hop Category
Favorite Rap/Hip-Hop Artist	2Pac	Bone Thugs-N-Harmony; Coolio
Soundtrack Album
Favorite Soundtrack	Waiting to Exhale	The Nutty Professor; The Crow: City of Angels
Merit
Little Richard
International Artist Award
Bee Gees
