= American Music Awards of 1988 =

US television program

15th Annual American Music Awards
- Date: January 25, 1988
- Venue: Shrine Auditorium, Los Angeles, California
- Country: United States
- Hosted by: Barbara Mandrell; Mick Fleetwood; Barry Gibb; Maurice Gibb; Robin Gibb; Whitney Houston
- Most awards: Randy Travis (4)
- Most nominations: Randy Travis (4)

Television/radio coverage
- Network: ABC
- Runtime: 180 minutes
- Produced by: Dick Clark Productions

The 15th Annual American Music Awards were held on January 25, 1988, at the Shrine Auditorium, in Los Angeles, California

== Performances ==
Artist(s)	Song(s)	Introduced by
Gloria Estefan; Miami Sound Machine	"Rhythm Is Gonna Get You" "Surrender" "Conga"	Barbara Mandrell
Whitney Houston	"Where Do Broken Hearts Go"	Barbara Mandrell
Bee Gees	"You Win Again"	Mick Fleetwood
Eric Carmen; Bill Medley; Jennifer Warnes	Dirty Dancing medley: "Hungry Eyes" (Eric Carmen) "(I've Had) The Time of My Life" (Medley & Warnes) "Johnny's Mambo" (instrumental) "Do You Love Me" (instrumental) "(I've Had) The Time of My Life" (replay) (Medley & Warnes)	Whitney Houston
Lisa Lisa and Cult Jam	"Head to Toe"	Mick Fleetwood
LL Cool J	"I'm Bad"	Mick Fleetwood
Smokey Robinson	"Love Don't Give No Reason"	Barbara Mandrell
Barbara Mandrell	"Sure Feels Good Being with You"	Smokey Robinson
Whitney Houston; Cissy Houston; Gary Houston	"Wonderful Counselor"	Whitney Houston
Icehouse (Note: Via satellite from Sydney, Australia.)	"Electric Blue"	Olivia Newton-John
Randy Travis	"Forever and Ever, Amen"	Barbara Mandrell
The Beach Boys and all artists	"Surfin' U.S.A."	Glen Campbell

== Winners and nominees ==
Subcategory	Winner	Nominees
Pop/Rock Category
Favorite Pop/Rock Male Artist	Paul Simon	Michael Jackson; George Michael
Favorite Pop/Rock Female Artist	Whitney Houston	Janet Jackson; Madonna
Favorite Pop/Rock Band/Duo/Group	Bon Jovi	Lisa Lisa and Cult Jam; U2
Favorite Pop/Rock Album	Graceland – Paul Simon	Slippery When Wet – Bon Jovi; The Joshua Tree – U2; Whitesnake 1987 – Whitesnake
Favorite Pop/Rock Song	"I Wanna Dance with Somebody (Who Loves Me)" – Whitney Houston	"Livin' On A Prayer" – Bon Jovi "Shakedown" – Bob Seger
Favorite Pop/Rock and Soul/R&B Video	"When I Think of You" – Janet Jackson	"Sledgehammer" – Peter Gabriel "I Didn't Mean to Turn You On" – Robert Palmer
Soul/R&B Category
Favorite Soul/R&B Male Artist	Luther Vandross	LL Cool J Smokey Robinson
Favorite Soul/R&B Female Artist	Anita Baker	Whitney Houston; Janet Jackson
Favorite Soul/R&B Band/Duo/Group	Cameo	Club Nouveau; Lisa Lisa and Cult Jam
Favorite Soul/R&B Album	Rapture – Anita Baker	Bigger & Deffer – LL Cool J Give Me the Reason – Luther Vandross
Favorite Soul/R&B Song	"Bad" – Michael Jackson	"Casanova" – Levert "Looking For A New Love" – Jody Watley
Favorite Pop/Rock and Soul/R&B Video	"When I Think of You" – Janet Jackson	"Sledgehammer" – Peter Gabriel "I Didn't Mean to Turn You On" – Robert Palmer
Country Category
Favorite Country Male Artist	Randy Travis	George Strait; Hank Williams, Jr.
Favorite Country Female Artist	Reba McEntire	Rosanne Cash; Tanya Tucker
Favorite Country Band/Duo/Group	Alabama	The Judds; Restless Heart
Favorite Country Album	Always & Forever – Randy Travis	Heartland – The Judds; Ocean Front Property – George Strait
Favorite Country Song	"Forever and Ever, Amen" – Randy Travis	"Ocean Front Property" – George Strait "Born to Boogie" – Hank Williams, Jr.
Favorite Country Video	"Forever and Ever, Amen" – Randy Travis	"What Am I Gonna Do About You" – Reba McEntire "My Name Is Bocephus" – Hank Williams, Jr.
Merit
The Beach Boys
