= American Music Awards of 1986 =

US television program

13th Annual American Music Awards
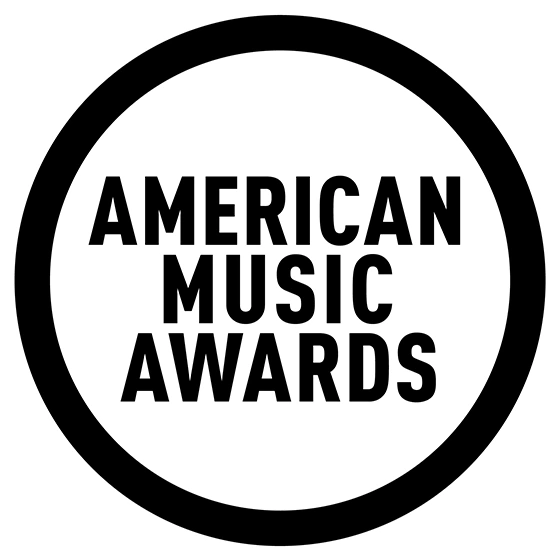
- Date: January 27, 1986
- Venue: Shrine Auditorium, Los Angeles, California
- Country: United States
- Hosted by: Diana Ross

Highlights
- Most awards: Bruce Springsteen (3)
- Most nominations: Whitney Houston (4)

Television/radio coverage
- Network: ABC
- Runtime: 180 min.
- Produced by: Dick Clark Productions

The 13th Annual American Music Awards were held on January 27, 1986.

== Performances ==
Artist(s)	Song(s)
Diana Ross	"Eaten Alive"
Mr. Mister	"Kyrie"
Whitney Houston	"How Will I Know"
Tears for Fears	"Everybody Wants to Rule the World" (via satellite from London)
Anne Murray	"Now and Forever (You and Me)"
Teddy Pendergrass	"Love 4/2"
Diana Ross	"Chain Reaction"
Hank Williams Jr; The Bama Band	"Aint Misbehavin’"
Aretha Franklin	"Another Night" (via satellite from Detroit)
Kool & The Gang	"Emergency"
The Nelsons	Tribute to Rick Nelson: "Be Still"
All artists	"We Are The World"

== Winners and nominees ==
Subcategory	Winner	Nominees
Pop/Rock Categories
Favorite Pop/Rock Male Artist	Bruce Springsteen	Phil Collins; Prince
Favorite Pop/Rock Female Artist	Tina Turner	Whitney Houston; Madonna
Favorite Pop/Rock Band/Duo/Group	Chicago	Kool & The Gang; Tears for Fears
Favorite Pop/Rock Album	Born in the U.S.A. – Bruce Springsteen	No Jacket Required – Phil Collins; Like a Virgin – Madonna
Favorite Pop/Rock Song	"The Power of Love" – Huey Lewis and the News	"Money for Nothing" – Dire Straits "Careless Whisper" – Wham!
Favorite Pop/Rock Video	"The Power of Love" – Huey Lewis and the News	"Take On Me" – a-ha "Easy Lover" – Philip Bailey & Phil Collins
Favorite Pop/Rock Male Video Artist	Bruce Springsteen	Phil Collins; Huey Lewis
Favorite Pop/Rock Female Video Artist	Pat Benatar	Aretha Franklin; Madonna
Favorite Pop/Rock Band/Duo/Group Video Artist	Wham!	Eurythmics; Tears for Fears
Soul/R&B Categories
Favorite Soul/R&B Male Artist	Stevie Wonder	Prince; Luther Vandross
Favorite Soul/R&B Female Artist	Aretha Franklin	Whitney Houston; Diana Ross
Favorite Soul/R&B Band/Duo/Group	Kool & The Gang	New Edition; Ready For The World
Favorite Soul/R&B Album	Emergency – Kool & The Gang	Whitney Houston – Whitney Houston; The Night I Fell in Love – Luther Vandross
Favorite Soul/R&B Song	"You Give Good Love" – Whitney Houston	"Nightshift" – The Commodores "You Are My Lady" – Freddie Jackson
Favorite Soul/R&B Video	"Saving All My Love for You" – Whitney Houston	"Freeway of Love" – Aretha Franklin "Oh Sheila" – Ready For The World
Favorite Soul/R&B Male Video Artist	Stevie Wonder	Philip Bailey & Phil Collins; Prince
Favorite Soul/R&B Female Video Artist	Aretha Franklin	Whitney Houston; Sade
Favorite Soul/R&B Band/Duo/Group Video Artist	The Pointer Sisters	Ashford & Simpson; Kool & The Gang
Country Categories
Favorite Country Male Artist	Willie Nelson	Lee Greenwood; Hank Williams, Jr.
Favorite Country Female Artist	Crystal Gayle	Anne Murray; Dolly Parton
Favorite Country Band/Duo/Group	Alabama	The Judds; The Oak Ridge Boys
Favorite Country Album	40-Hour Week – Alabama	City of New Orleans – Willie Nelson; Country Boy – Ricky Skaggs
Favorite Country Song	"Forgiving You Was Easy" – Willie Nelson	"There's No Way" – Alabama "Dixie Road" – Lee Greenwood
Favorite Country Video	"The Highwayman" – The Highwaymen	"40-Hour Week" – Alabama "All My Rowdy Friends" – Hank Williams, Jr.
Favorite Country Male Video Artist	Hank Williams, Jr.	Lee Greenwood; Ricky Skaggs
Favorite Country Female Video Artist	Crystal Gayle	Janie Fricke; Anne Murray
Favorite Country Band/Duo/Group Video Artist	The Highwayman	Alabama; The Oak Ridge Boys
Merit
Paul McCartney
Award of Appreciation
Michael Jackson
Song of the Year
We Are the World
