= American Music Awards of 1987 =

US television program

14th Annual American Music Awards
- Date: January 26, 1987
- Country: United States
- First award: 1973

Highlights
- Most awards: Whitney Houston (5)
- Most nominations: Janet Jackson (9)

Television/radio coverage
- Network: ABC
- Runtime: 180 min.
- Produced by: Dick Clark Productions

The 14th Annual American Music Awards were held on January 26, 1987.

== Winners and nominees ==
| Subcategory | Winner | Nominees |
|---|---|---|
Pop/Rock Category
| Favorite Pop/Rock Male Artist | Lionel Richie | Peter Gabriel; Robert Palmer; David Lee Roth |
| Favorite Pop/Rock Female Artist | Whitney Houston | Janet Jackson; Tina Turner; Madonna |
| Favorite Pop/Rock Band/Duo/Group | Huey Lewis and the News | Genesis; Heart; Van Halen |
| Favorite Pop/Rock Album | Whitney Houston - Whitney Houston | Control - Janet Jackson; Top Gun soundtrack 5150 - Van Halen |
| Favorite Pop/Rock Song | "There'll Be Sad Songs (To Make You Cry)" - Billy Ocean | "Live To Tell" - Madonna "West End Girls" - Pet Shop Boys "Higher Love" - Steve Winwood |
| Favorite Pop/Rock Video | "Dancing on the Ceiling" - Lionel Richie | "Mad About You" - Belinda Carlisle "When I Think of You" - Janet Jackson "I Didn't Mean to Turn You On" - Robert Palmer |
| Favorite Pop/Rock Male Video Artist | Billy Ocean | Peter Gabriel; Howard Jones; Robert Palmer |
| Favorite Pop/Rock Female Video Artist | Madonna | Belinda Carlisle; Whitney Houston; Janet Jackson |
| Favorite Pop/Rock Band/Duo/Group Video Artist | Huey Lewis & The News | Culture Club; Run–D.M.C. Simple Minds |
Soul/R&B Category
| Favorite Soul/R&B Male Artist | Lionel Richie | Freddie Jackson; Billy Ocean; Stevie Wonder |
| Favorite Soul/R&B Female Artist | Whitney Houston | Anita Baker; Janet Jackson; Patti LaBelle |
| Favorite Soul/R&B Band/Duo/Group | New Edition | Atlantic Starr; Cameo; Run-D.M.C. |
| Favorite Soul/R&B Album | Whitney Houston - Whitney Houston | Rapture - Anita Baker; Control - Janet Jackson; Raising Hell - Run-D.M.C. |
| Favorite Soul/R&B Song | "Nasty" - Janet Jackson | "Word Up" - Cameo "Kiss" - Prince "Rumors" - Timex Social Club |
| Favorite Soul/R&B Video | "Greatest Love of All" - Whitney Houston | "When I Think of You" - Janet Jackson "There'll Be Sad Songs (To Make You Cry)" - Billy Ocean "Walk This Way" - Run-D.M.C. |
| Favorite Soul/R&B Male Video Artist | Lionel Richie | James Brown; Oran "Juice" Jones; Billy Ocean |
| Favorite Soul/R&B Female Video Artist | Janet Jackson | Aretha Franklin; Whitney Houston; Tina Turner |
| Favorite Soul/R&B Band/Duo/Group Video Artist | Kool & The Gang | Cameo; The Jets; Run-D.M.C. |
Country Category
| Favorite Country Male Artist | Willie Nelson | Ronnie Milsap; George Strait; Hank Williams, Jr. |
| Favorite Country Female Artist | Barbara Mandrell | Reba McEntire; Juice Newton; Tanya Tucker |
| Favorite Country Band/Duo/Group | Alabama | The Forester Sisters; The Judds; Marie Osmond & Paul Davis |
| Favorite Country Album | Greatest Hits - Alabama | Rockin' with the Rhythm - The Judds; Whoever's in New England - Reba McEntire; Something Special - George Strait |
| Favorite Country Song | "Grandpa (Tell Me 'Bout the Good Ol' Days)" - The Judds | "Everything That Glitters (Is Not Gold)" - Dan Seals "Diggin' Up Bones" - Randy Travis "You Can Dream of Me" - Steve Wariner |
| Favorite Country Video | "Grandpa (Tell Me 'Bout the Good Ol' Days)" - The Judds | "Who's Gonna Fill Their Shoes" - George Jones "Whoever's in New England" - Reba McEntire "Honky Tonk Man" - Dwight Yoakam |
| Favorite Country Male Video Artist | George Jones | Mel McDaniel; Gary Morris; George Strait |
| Favorite Country Female Video Artist | Reba McEntire | Janie Fricke; Anne Murray; Marie Osmond |
| Favorite Country Band/Duo/Group Video Artist | Alabama | The Forester Sisters; The Judds; Sawyer Brown |
Merit
Elvis Presley

Other awards

| Winner | Award | Nominee/work |
|---|---|---|
| Dionne Warwick | Special Recognition Award | "That's What Friends Are For" |

== Performers ==
- Diana Ross – Touch By Touch
- Genesis – Invisible Touch (Live from Cleveland)
- Janet Jackson – Control
- Robert Palmer – I Didn't Mean to Turn You On
- Whitney Houston – All at Once
- Dionne Warwick, Gladys Knight, Diana Ross – That's What Friends Are For
