= American Music Awards of 1974 =

US television program

1st Annual American Music Awards
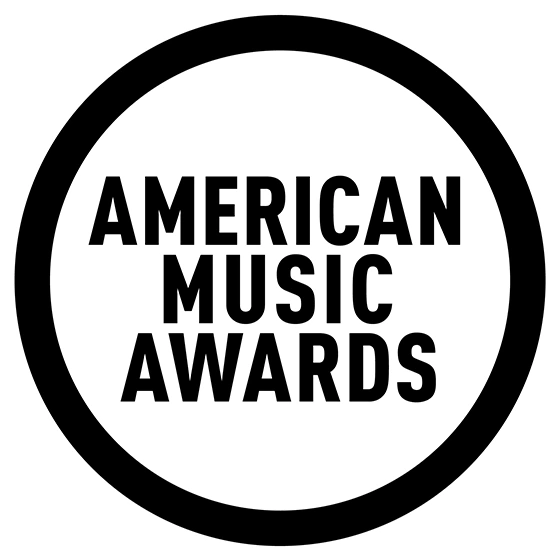
- American music awards
- Date: February 19, 1974
- Venue: Earl Carroll Theatre, New York City
- Country: United States
- Hosted by: Helen Reddy; Roger Miller; Smokey Robinson

Highlights
- Most awards: Stevie Wonder; Charley Pride (2 each)
- Most nominations: Stevie Wonder (3)

Television/radio coverage
- Runtime: 120 min.
- Produced by: Dick Clark Productions

The first Annual American Music Awards was a televised awards show, produced by Dick Clark Productions, which aired on ABC February 19, 1974.

== Ceremony ==
The ceremony was hosted by Australian pop singer Helen Reddy, Motown singer Smokey Robinson, and honky tonk singer-songwriter Roger Miller. Reddy went on to win the award for Favorite Pop/Rock Female Artist in the year's ceremony.

Gladys Knight & the Pips performed Midnight Train to Georgia at the ceremony. In 2024, Knight reprised the performance at the 50th anniversary special.

== Presenters ==
- Roberta Flack – presented Favorite Male Pop Vocalist
- Smokey Robinson and Roger Miller – presented Favorite Female Pop Vocalist
- Michael Jackson and Donny Osmond – presented Favorite Soul/R&B Band/Duo/Group
- Michael Jackson, Donny Osmond, Rodney Allen Rippy, and Ricky Segall – presented Favorite Pop Group
- Lynn Anderson and Henry Mancini – presented Favorite Pop Album
- Bobbie Gentry and Paul Williams – presented Favorite Pop Song
- Dick Haymes – presented Favorite Male Soul Vocalist
- Vikki Carr and Al Green – presented Favorite Female Soul Vocalist
- David Hartman and Barbara McNair – presented Favorite Soul Album
- Mac Davis and Sandy Duncan – presented Favorite Soul Single
- Jack Burns and Avery Schreiber – presented Favorite Male Country Vocalist
- Karen Valentine and Ed McMahon – presented Favorite Female Country Vocalist
- The Lennon Sisters – presented Favorite Country Group
- Lucie Arnaz and Chuck Berry – presented Favorite Country Album
- Allan Blye and Bobby Goldsboro – presented Favorite Country Single
- Ronald Reagan – presented Merit

== Winners and nominees ==
Subcategory	Winner	Nominees	Ref
Pop/Rock Category
Favorite Pop/Rock Male Artist	Jim Croce	Elton John; Stevie Wonder	
Favorite Pop/Rock Female Artist	Helen Reddy	Roberta Flack; Diana Ross	
Favorite Pop/Rock Band/Duo/Group	The Carpenters	Gladys Knight & The Pips; Tony Orlando & Dawn	
Favorite Pop/Rock Album	Lady Sings The Blues – Diana Ross	Summer Breeze – Seals & Crofts; The World Is A Ghetto – War	
Favorite Pop/Rock Song	"Tie a Yellow Ribbon Round the Ole Oak Tree" – Tony Orlando & Dawn	"Bad, Bad Leroy Brown" – Jim Croce "Killing Me Softly" – Roberta Flack	
Soul/R&B Category
Favorite Soul/R&B Male Artist	Stevie Wonder	James Brown; Al Green	
Favorite Soul/R&B Female Artist	Roberta Flack	Aretha Franklin; Betty Wright	
Favorite Soul/R&B Band/Duo/Group	The Temptations	Gladys Knight & The Pips; The O'Jays	
Favorite Soul/R&B Album	I'm Still In Love With You – Al Green	Let's Get It On – Marvin Gaye; The World Is A Ghetto – War	
Favorite Soul/R&B Song	"Superstition" – Stevie Wonder	"Me and Mrs. Jones" – Billy Paul "Midnight Train to Georgia" – Gladys Knight & the Pips	
Country Category
Favorite Country Male Artist	Charley Pride	Merle Haggard; Conway Twitty	
Favorite Country Female Artist	Lynn Anderson	Loretta Lynn; Tammy Wynette	
Favorite Country Band/Duo/Group	The Carter Family	The Osborne Brothers; The Statler Brothers	
Favorite Country Album	A Sunshiny Day with Charley Pride – Charley Pride	Behind Closed Doors – Charlie Rich; First Songs Of The First Lady – Tammy Wynette	
Favorite Country Song	"Behind Closed Doors" – Charlie Rich	"Why Me" – Kris Kristofferson "You've Never Been This Far Before" – Conway Twitty	
Merit
Bing Crosby
