= American Music Awards of 1984 =

US television program

11th Annual American Music Awards
- Date: January 16, 1984
- Venue: Shrine Auditorium, Los Angeles, California
- Country: United States
- Hosted by: Lionel Richie

Highlights
- Most awards: Michael Jackson (8)
- Most nominations: Michael Jackson (10)

Television/radio coverage
- Network: ABC
- Runtime: 180 min.
- Produced by: Dick Clark Productions

The 11th Annual American Music Awards were held on January 16, 1984. Michael Jackson was the big winner of the night, winning eight awards. The broadcast was watched by over 55 million viewers according to Nielsen, making it the most watched American Music Awards of all time.

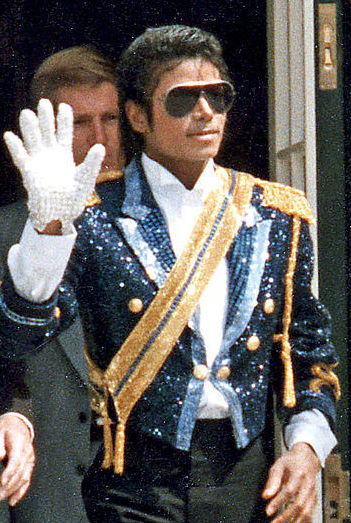
Michael Jackson won 8 awards

== Performances ==
Artist(s)	Song(s)
Lionel Richie	"All Night Long (All Night)"
Barry Manilow	"Read 'Em and Weep"
Alabama	"Roll On (Eighteen Wheeler)"
Culture Club	"Karma Chameleon" (live from London)
Irene Cara	"Flashdance... What a Feeling"
Barry Manilow	Tribute to Michael Jackson: "I'll Be There"
Lionel Richie	"Still" "Lady"
Barbara Mandrell; Richard Carpenter	Tribute to Karen Carpenter: "We've Only Just Begun"
Janie Fricke	"Let's Stop Talkin' About It"

== Winners and nominees ==
Subcategory	Winner	Nominees
Pop/Rock Categories
Favorite Pop/Rock Male Artist	Michael Jackson	David Bowie; Billy Joel; Lionel Richie
Favorite Pop/Rock Female Artist	Pat Benatar	Stevie Nicks; Donna Summer; Bonnie Tyler
Favorite Pop/Rock Band/Duo/Group	Daryl Hall & John Oates	Def Leppard; Men at Work; The Police
Favorite Pop/Rock Album	Thriller – Michael Jackson	Pyromania – Def Leppard; Flashdance Soundtrack; Synchronicity – The Police
Favorite Pop/Rock Song	"Billie Jean" – Michael Jackson	"Flashdance... What a Feeling" – Irene Cara "Every Breath You Take" – The Police "Total Eclipse of the Heart" – Bonnie Tyler
Favorite Pop/Rock Video	"Beat It" – Michael Jackson	"Billie Jean" – Michael Jackson "Tell Her About It – Billy Joel
Soul/R&B Categories
Favorite Soul/R&B Male Artist	Michael Jackson	Rick James; Prince; Lionel Richie
Favorite Soul/R&B Female Artist	Aretha Franklin	Angela Bofill; Irene Cara; Donna Summer
Favorite Soul/R&B Band/Duo/Group	Gladys Knight & The Pips	DeBarge; The Gap Band; The Isley Brothers
Favorite Soul/R&B Album	Thriller – Michael Jackson	Visions – Gladys Knight & The Pips; 1999 – Prince; Lionel Richie – Lionel Richie
Favorite Soul/R&B Song	"All Night Long (All Night)" – Lionel Richie	"Billie Jean" – Michael Jackson "Cold Blooded" – Rick James "Juicy Fruit" – Mtume
Favorite Soul/R&B Video	"Beat It" – Michael Jackson	"Billie Jean" – Michael Jackson "She Works Hard for the Money" – Donna Summer
Country Categories
Favorite Country Male Artist	Willie Nelson	Charley Pride; Kenny Rogers; Conway Twitty
Favorite Country Female Artist	Barbara Mandrell	Janie Fricke; Crystal Gayle; Sylvia
Favorite Country Band/Duo/Group	Alabama	The Oak Ridge Boys; Kenny Rogers & Dolly Parton; The Statler Brothers
Favorite Country Album	The Closer You Get... – Alabama	Somebody's Gonna Love You – Lee Greenwood; Pancho & Lefty – Merle Haggard & Willie Nelson; Highways & Heartaches – Ricky Skaggs
Favorite Country Song	"Islands in the Stream" – Kenny Rogers & Dolly Parton	"Dixieland Delight" – Alabama "Swingin'" – John Anderson "Love Song" – The Oak Ridge Boys
Favorite Country Video	"Dixieland Delight" – Alabama	"Pancho & Lefty" – Merle Haggard & Willie Nelson "Potential New Boyfriend" – Dolly Parton
Merit
Michael Jackson
