= American Music Award for Favorite Country Male Artist =

American Music Award

American Music Awards for Favorite Country Male Artist
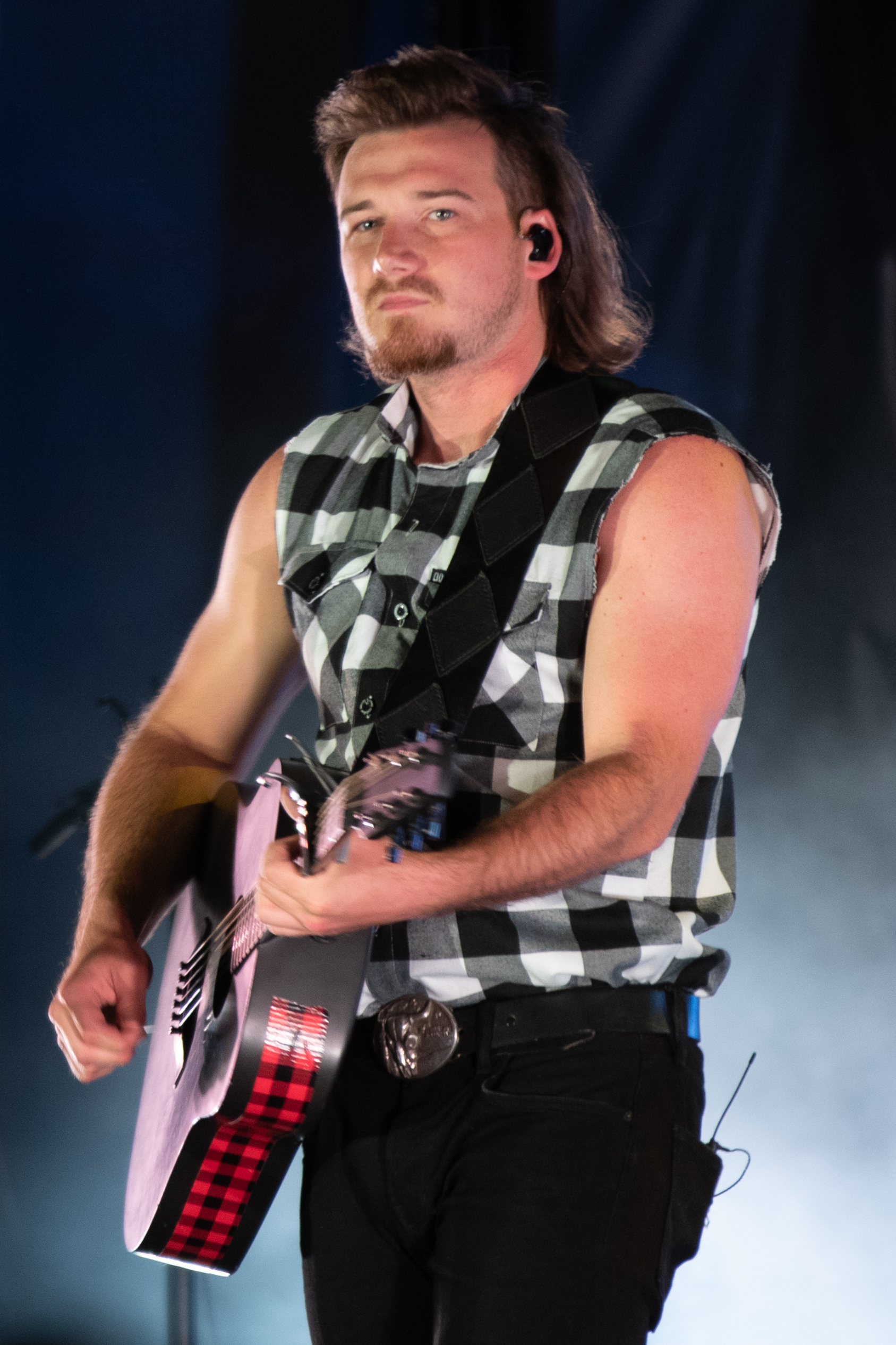
- Morgan Wallen is the most recent recipient
- Country: United States
- Presented by: American Music Awards
- First award: 1974
- Currently held by: Morgan Wallen

Highlights
- Most wins: Garth Brooks (8)
- Most nominations: George Strait (12)
- Website: theamas.com

The American Music Award for Favorite Male Artist – Country has been awarded since 1974. Years reflect the year in which the awards were presented, for works released in the previous year (until 2003 onward when awards were handed out on November of the same year). The all-time winner in this category is Garth Brooks with 8 wins.

== Winners and nominees ==
=== 1970s ===
Year	Artist	Ref
1974 (1st)
1974 (1st)	Charley Pride	
1974 (1st)	Merle Haggard	
1974 (1st)	Conway Twitty	
1975 (2nd)
1975 (2nd)	Charlie Rich	
1975 (2nd)	Roy Clark	
1975 (2nd)	Charley Pride	
1976 (3rd)
1976 (3rd)	John Denver	
1976 (3rd)	Merle Haggard	
1976 (3rd)	Charlie Rich	
1977 (4th)
1977 (4th)	Charley Pride	
1977 (4th)	Freddy Fender	
1977 (4th)	Conway Twitty	
1978 (5th)
1978 (5th)	Conway Twitty	
1978 (5th)	Waylon Jennings	
1978 (5th)	Kenny Rogers	
1979 (6th)
1979 (6th)	Kenny Rogers	
1979 (6th)	Merle Haggard	
1979 (6th)	Ronnie Milsap	

=== 1980s ===
Year	Artist	Ref
1980 (7th)
1980 (7th)	Kenny Rogers	
1980 (7th)	Waylon Jennings	
1980 (7th)	Willie Nelson	
1981 (8th)
1981 (8th)	Kenny Rogers	
1981 (8th)	Willie Nelson	
1981 (8th)	Charley Pride	
1982 (9th)
1982 (9th)	Willie Nelson	
1982 (9th)	Ronnie Milsap	
1982 (9th)	T. G. Sheppard	
1982 (9th)	Don Williams	
1983 (10th)
1983 (10th)	Kenny Rogers	
1983 (10th)	Charley Pride	
1983 (10th)	Conway Twitty	
1984 (11th)
1984 (11th)	Willie Nelson	
1984 (11th)	Charley Pride	
1984 (11th)	Kenny Rogers	
1984 (11th)	Conway Twitty	
1985 (12th)
1985 (12th)	Kenny Rogers	
1985 (12th)	Ricky Skaggs	
1985 (12th)	Hank Williams Jr.	
1986 (13th)
1986 (13th)	Willie Nelson	
1986 (13th)	Lee Greenwood	
1986 (13th)	Hank Williams Jr.	
1987 (14th)
1987 (14th)	Willie Nelson	
1987 (14th)	Ronnie Milsap	
1987 (14th)	George Strait	
1987 (14th)	Hank Williams Jr.	
1988 (15th)
1988 (15th)	Randy Travis	
1988 (15th)	George Strait	
1988 (15th)	Hank Williams Jr.	
1989 (16th)
1989 (16th)	Randy Travis	
1989 (16th)	George Strait	
1989 (16th)	Hank Williams Jr.	

=== 1990s ===
Year	Artist	Ref
1990 (17th)
1990 (17th)	Randy Travis	
1990 (17th)	George Strait	
1990 (17th)	Hank Williams Jr.	
1991 (18th)
1991 (18th)	George Strait	
1991 (18th)	Clint Black	
1991 (18th)	Garth Brooks	
1992 (19th)
1992 (19th)	Garth Brooks	
1992 (19th)	Clint Black	
1992 (19th)	Ricky Van Shelton	
1993 (20th)
1993 (20th)	Garth Brooks	
1993 (20th)	Billy Ray Cyrus	
1993 (20th)	Vince Gill	
1993 (20th)	Alan Jackson	
1994 (21st)
1994 (21st)	Garth Brooks	
1994 (21st)	Vince Gill	
1994 (21st)	Alan Jackson	
1994 (21st)	George Strait	
1995 (22nd)
1995 (22nd)	Garth Brooks	
1995 (22nd)	Vince Gill	
1995 (22nd)	Alan Jackson	
1996 (23rd)
1996 (23rd)	Garth Brooks	
1996 (23rd)	Alan Jackson	
1996 (23rd)	George Strait	
1997 (24th)
1997 (24th)	Garth Brooks	
1997 (24th)	Alan Jackson	
1997 (24th)	George Strait	
1998 (25th)
1998 (25th)	George Strait	
1998 (25th)	Clint Black	
1998 (25th)	Alan Jackson	
1999 (26th)
1999 (26th)	Garth Brooks	
1999 (26th)	Tim McGraw	
1999 (26th)	George Strait	

=== 2000s ===
Year	Artist	Ref
2000 (27th)
2000 (27th)	Garth Brooks	
2000 (27th)	Tim McGraw	
2000 (27th)	George Strait	
2001 (28th)
2001 (28th)	Tim McGraw	
2001 (28th)	Alan Jackson	
2001 (28th)	George Strait	
2002 (29th)
2002 (29th)	Tim McGraw	
2002 (29th)	Toby Keith	
2002 (29th)	Travis Tritt	
2003 (30th)
2003 (30th)	Tim McGraw	
2003 (30th)	Alan Jackson	
2003 (30th)	Toby Keith	
2003 (31st)
2003 (31st)	Tim McGraw	
2003 (31st)	Kenny Chesney	
2003 (31st)	Alan Jackson	
2003 (31st)	Toby Keith	
2004 (32nd)
2004 (32nd)	Toby Keith	
2004 (32nd)	Kenny Chesney	
2004 (32nd)	Alan Jackson	
2004 (32nd)	Tim McGraw	
2005 (33rd)
2005 (33rd)	Tim McGraw	
2005 (33rd)	Kenny Chesney	
2005 (33rd)	Toby Keith	
2006 (34th)
2006 (34th)	Toby Keith	
2006 (34th)	Kenny Chesney	
2006 (34th)	Keith Urban	
2007 (35th)
2007 (35th)	Tim McGraw	
2007 (35th)	Toby Keith	
2007 (35th)	Brad Paisley	
2008 (36th)
2008 (36th)	Brad Paisley	
2008 (36th)	Garth Brooks	
2008 (36th)	Kenny Chesney	
2009 (37th)
2009 (37th)	Keith Urban	
2009 (37th)	Jason Aldean	
2009 (37th)	Darius Rucker	

=== 2010s ===
Year	Artist	Ref
2010 (38th)
2010 (38th)	Brad Paisley	
2010 (38th)	Jason Aldean	
2010 (38th)	Luke Bryan	
2011 (39th)
2011 (39th)	Blake Shelton	
2011 (39th)	Jason Aldean	
2011 (39th)	Brad Paisley	
2012 (40th)
2012 (40th)	Luke Bryan	
2012 (40th)	Jason Aldean	
2012 (40th)	Eric Church	
2013 (41st)
2013 (41st)	Luke Bryan	
2013 (41st)	Hunter Hayes	
2013 (41st)	Blake Shelton	
2014 (42nd)
2014 (42nd)	Luke Bryan	
2014 (42nd)	Jason Aldean	
2014 (42nd)	Blake Shelton	
2015 (43rd)
2015 (43rd)	Luke Bryan	
2015 (43rd)	Jason Aldean	
2015 (43rd)	Sam Hunt	
2016 (44th)
2016 (44th)	Blake Shelton	
2016 (44th)	Luke Bryan	
2016 (44th)	Thomas Rhett	
2017 (45th)
2017 (45th)	Keith Urban	
2017 (45th)	Sam Hunt	
2017 (45th)	Thomas Rhett	
2018 (46th)
2018 (46th)	Kane Brown	
2018 (46th)	Luke Bryan	
2018 (46th)	Thomas Rhett	
2019 (47th)
2019 (47th)	Kane Brown	
2019 (47th)	Luke Combs	
2019 (47th)	Thomas Rhett	

=== 2020s ===
Year	Artist	Ref
2020 (48th)	Kane Brown	
2020 (48th)	Luke Combs	
2020 (48th)	Morgan Wallen	
2021 (49th)	Luke Bryan	
2021 (49th)	Chris Stapleton	
2021 (49th)	Jason Aldean	
2021 (49th)	Luke Combs	
2021 (49th)	Morgan Wallen	
2022 (50th)	Morgan Wallen	
2022 (50th)	Luke Combs	
2022 (50th)	Walker Hayes	
2022 (50th)	Cody Johnson	
2022 (50th)	Chris Stapleton	
2025 (51st)	Post Malone	
2025 (51st)	Jelly Roll	
2025 (51st)	Luke Combs	
2025 (51st)	Shaboozey	
2025 (51st)	Morgan Wallen	
2026 (52nd)	Morgan Wallen	
2026 (52nd)	Luke Combs	
2026 (52nd)	Riley Green	
2026 (52nd)	Jelly Roll	
2026 (52nd)	Shaboozey	

== Category facts ==
=== Multiple wins ===
8 wins

- Garth Brooks

6 wins

- Tim McGraw

5 wins

- Luke Bryan
- Kenny Rogers

4 wins

- Willie Nelson

3 wins

- Charley Pride
- Randy Travis
- Kane Brown

2 wins

- Toby Keith
- Brad Paisley
- Blake Shelton
- George Strait
- Keith Urban
- Morgan Wallen

=== Multiple nominations ===
12 nominations

- George Strait

10 nominations

- Garth Brooks
- Alan Jackson

9 nominations

- Tim McGraw

7 nominations

- Jason Aldean
- Luke Bryan
- Toby Keith
- Kenny Rogers

6 nominations

- Luke Combs
- Willie Nelson
- Charley Pride
- Hank Williams Jr.

5 nominations

- Kenny Chesney
- Conway Twitty
- Morgan Wallen

4 nominations

- Brad Paisley
- Thomas Rhett
- Blake Shelton

3 nominations

- Clint Black
- Kane Brown
- Vince Gill
- Merle Haggard
- Ronnie Milsap
- Randy Travis
- Keith Urban

2 nominations

- Sam Hunt
- Jelly Roll
- Waylon Jennings
- Charlie Rich
- Shaboozey
- Chris Stapleton
