= American Music Awards of 2006 =

US television program

34th Annual American Music Awards
- Date: November 21, 2006
- Location: Shrine Auditorium, Los Angeles, California
- Country: United States
- Hosted by: Jimmy Kimmel
- Most awards: The Black Eyed Peas (3)
- Most nominations: Mariah Carey, Red Hot Chili Peppers, Rascal Flatts and The Black Eyed Peas, The Pussycat Dolls 3 (each)

Television/radio coverage
- Network: ABC (November 21, 2006); RCTI (November 25, 2006)
- Produced by: Dick Clark Productions

The 34th Annual American Music Awards were held on November 21, 2006. They were hosted by Jimmy Kimmel. The awards recognized the most popular albums and artists from the year of 2005–2006. As usual, the ceremony was broadcast by ABC.

== Musical performances ==
Artist	Song(s)
Beyoncé	"Irreplaceable"
Carrie Underwood	"Jesus, Take the Wheel" "Don't Forget to Remember Me" "Before He Cheats"
The Pussycat Dolls	"Buttons"
Josh Groban	"February Song"
Nelly Furtado; Saurkrates	"Say it Right"
Snow Patrol	"Chasing Cars"
Gwen Stefani	"Wind It Up"
Jay Z	"Show Me What You Got"
Dixie Chicks	"Easy Silence"
Tenacious D	"POD"
Mary J Blige	"We Ride (I See The Future)"
Lionel Richie	"I Call It Love" "All Night Long (All Night)"
Fall Out Boy	"This Aint a Scene, It’s a Arm Race"
Rascal Flatts	"Life is a Highway"
Jamie Foxx	"Wish U Were Here"
Rascal Flatts	"Life is a Highway"
Barry Manilow	"Can't Take My Eyes Off You"
John Mayer	"Waiting On the World to Change"
Akon; Snoop Dogg	"I Wanna Love You" "Smack That" "Thats That"

== Winners and nominees ==
Artist of the Year	New Artist of the Year
Rascal Flatts; Beyoncé; Daniel Powter; Mary J. Blige; The Pussycat Dolls	Carrie Underwood; Chamillionaire; The Fray; James Blunt; The Pussycat Dolls; Teddy Geiger
Favorite Pop/Rock Male Artist	Favorite Pop/Rock Female Artist
Sean Paul; Kanye West; Nick Lachey	Kelly Clarkson; Mariah Carey; Nelly Furtado
Favorite Pop/Rock Band/Duo/Group	Favorite Pop/Rock Album
Red Hot Chili Peppers; Nickelback; The Pussycat Dolls	Nickelback - All the Right Reasons; Red Hot Chili Peppers - Stadium Arcadium; High School Musical
Favorite Country Male Artist	Favorite Country Female Artist
Toby Keith; Keith Urban; Kenny Chesney	Faith Hill; Carrie Underwood; Gretchen Wilson
Favorite Country Band/Duo/Group	Favorite Country Album
Rascal Flatts; Brooks & Dunn; Montgomery Gentry	Tim McGraw - Reflected: Greatest Hits Vol. 2; Johnny Cash - The Legend of Johnny Cash; Rascal Flatts - Me and My Gang
Favorite Soul/R&B Male Artist	Favorite Soul/R&B Female Artist
Jamie Foxx; Chris Brown; Ne-Yo	Mary J. Blige; Keyshia Cole; Mariah Carey
Favorite Soul/R&B Band/Duo/Group	Favorite Soul/R&B Album
The Black Eyed Peas; The Isley Brothers; Jagged Edge	Mary J. Blige - The Breakthrough; Jamie Foxx - Unpredictable; Mariah Carey - The Emancipation of Mimi
Favorite Rap/Hip-Hop Artist	Favorite Rap/Hip-Hop Band/Duo/Group
Eminem; Kanye West; T.I.	The Black Eyed Peas; Dem Franchize Boyz; Three 6 Mafia
Favorite Rap/Hip-Hop Album	Favorite Adult Contemporary Artist
The Black Eyed Peas - Monkey Business; Eminem - Curtain Call: The Hits; T.I. - King	Kelly Clarkson; Michael Buble; Rob Thomas
Favorite Alternative Artist	Favorite Latin Artist
Red Hot Chili Peppers; Nickelback; Pearl Jam	Shakira; Daddy Yankee; Don Omar
Favorite Contemporary Inspirational Artist
Kirk Franklin; Aly & AJ; Casting Crowns
