= American Music Awards of 2004 =

US television program

32nd Annual American Music Awards
- Date: November 14, 2004
- Location: Shrine Auditorium, Los Angeles, California
- Country: United States
- Hosted by: Jimmy Kimmel
- Most awards: Usher (4)
- Most nominations: Usher (5)

Television/radio coverage
- Network: ABC (November 14, 2004); Trans TV (November 20, 2004)
- Runtime: 180 minutes
- Produced by: Dick Clark Productions

The 32nd Annual American Music Awards were held on November 14, 2004, at the Shrine Auditorium, in Los Angeles, California. The awards recognized the most popular artists and albums from the year 2004.

== Performances ==
Artist	Song
Gwen Stefani	"What You Waiting For?"
Lenny Kravitz	"Lady"
Jessica Simpson	"With You"
Kenny Chesney; Uncle Kracker	"When the Sun Goes Down"
Kanye West	"The New Workout Plan"
The Black Eyed Peas as BEP	Let's Get It Started (Clean)
John Mayer	"Daughters"
Rod Stewart	"What a Wonderful World"
Alicia Keys	"Karma"
Gretchen Wilson	"Redneck Woman"
Snoop Dogg; Pharrell	"Drop It Like It's Hot"
Bon Jovi	"It's My Life" "Have a Nice Day"
Fantasia	"Free Yourself"
Maroon 5	"Sunday Morning"
Usher; Alicia Keys	"My Boo"
Josh Groban	"Remember When It Rained"
Toby Keith	"Stays in Mexico"
Jamie Foxx; Kanye West; Twista	"Slow Jamz"

== Winners and nominees ==
Artist of the Year	New Artist of the Year
Kenny Chesney; Evanescence; Norah Jones; Outkast; Usher	Gretchen Wilson; Kanye West; Maroon 5
Favorite Pop/Rock Male Artist	Favorite Pop/Rock Female Artist
Usher; Josh Groban; Lenny Kravitz; Michael McDonald	Sheryl Crow; Avril Lavigne; Jessica Simpson
Favorite Pop/Rock Band/Duo/Group	Favorite Pop/Rock Album
Outkast; Evanescence; Nickelback	Usher - Confessions; Jessica Simpson - In This Skin; Norah Jones - Feels Like Home
Favorite Country Male Artist	Favorite Country Female Artist
Toby Keith; Alan Jackson; Kenny Chesney; Tim McGraw	Reba McEntire; Gretchen Wilson; Martina McBride
Favorite Country Band/Duo/Group	Favorite Country Album
Brooks & Dunn; Lonestar; Rascal Flatts	Toby Keith - Shock'n Y'all; Kenny Chesney - When the Sun Goes Down; Martina McBride - Martina
Favorite Soul/R&B Male Artist	Favorite Soul/R&B Female Artist
Usher; Prince; R. Kelly; Ruben Studdard	Alicia Keys; Beyoncé; Janet Jackson
Favorite Soul/R&B Album	Favorite Rap/Hip-Hop Artist
Usher - Confessions; Alicia Keys - The Diary of Alicia Keys; Prince - Musicology	Jay-Z; Juvenile; Kanye West; Lil' Flip
Favorite Rap/Hip-Hop Band/Duo/Group	Favorite Rap/Hip-Hop Album
Outkast; G-Unit; Ying Yang Twins	Outkast - Speakerboxxx/The Love Below; Jay-Z - The Black Album; Kanye West - The College Dropout
Favorite Adult Contemporary Artist	Favorite Alternative Artist
Sheryl Crow; Harry Connick Jr.; Norah Jones	Linkin Park; Incubus; Jet
Favorite Latin Artist	Favorite Contemporary Inspirational Artist
Marc Anthony; Intocable; Paulina Rubio	MercyMe; Steven Curtis Chapman; Third Day
Award of Merit
Bon Jovi
