= American Music Awards of 2002 =

US television program

29th Annual American Music Awards
- Date: January 9, 2002
- Location: Shrine Auditorium, Los Angeles, California
- Country: United States
- Hosted by: Jenny McCarthy; Sean "P. Diddy" Combs

Highlights
- Most awards: Alicia Keys, Destiny's Child and Aaliyah (2 each)
- Most nominations: Alicia Keys (6)

Television/radio coverage
- Network: ABC
- Runtime: 180 min.
- Produced by: Dick Clark Productions

The 29th American Music Awards were held on January 9, 2002, at the Shrine Auditorium, in Los Angeles, California. The awards recognized the most popular artists and albums from the year 2001.

The nominations were announced on November 13, 2001, with Alicia Keys leading the nominations with five nods, followed by Destiny's Child, Shaggy and Tim McGraw with three each.

All nominees are listed below, and the winners are listed in bold.

== Performances ==
Artist(s)	Song(s)
P. Diddy; Snoop Dogg; Mr. Cheeks; Lil' Bow Wow; Ben Stiller	"Bad Boy for Life" "Lights, Camera, Action!"
Lenny Kravitz	"Dig In"
Toby Keith	"I Wanna Talk About Me"
Usher; Richie Sambora (on guitar)	"U Got It Bad"
Britney Spears	"I'm Not a Girl, Not Yet a Woman"
Yolanda Adams	"Open My Heart" "Never Give Up"
Shaggy	"It Wasn't Me"
Cher	"Song for the Lonely"
Brooks & Dunn	"Ain't Nothing 'bout You"
Carbon Leaf	"The Boxer"
Kid Rock	"Lonely Road of Faith" "Lay it on Me"
Luther Vandross	Tribute to George Harrison: "Something" "My Sweet Lord"

== Winners and nominees ==
Subcategory	Winner	Nominees
**Artist of the Year**
Artist of the Year	**U2**	Destiny's Child; Janet Jackson; Alicia Keys; Tim McGraw; Shaggy
**Pop/Rock Category**
Favorite Pop/Rock Male Artist	**Lenny Kravitz**	R. Kelly; Shaggy
Favorite Pop/Rock Female Artist	**Janet Jackson**	Alicia Keys; Jennifer Lopez
Favorite Pop/Rock Band/Duo/Group	***NSYNC**	Dave Matthews Band; U2
Favorite Pop/Rock Album	**Survivor** - **Destiny's Child**	Everyday - Dave Matthews Band; Celebrity - *NSYNC
Favorite Pop/Rock New Artist	**Alicia Keys**	Nelly Furtado; Lifehouse
**Soul/R&B Category**
Favorite Soul/R&B Male Artist	**Luther Vandross**	Ginuwine; R. Kelly
Favorite Soul/R&B Female Artist	**Aaliyah**	Mary J. Blige; Alicia Keys
Favorite Soul/R&B Band/Duo/Group	**Destiny's Child**	The Isley Brothers; Jagged Edge
Favorite Soul/R&B Album	**Aaliyah** - **Aaliyah**	All for You - Janet Jackson; Songs in A Minor - Alicia Keys
Favorite Soul/R&B New Artist	**Alicia Keys**	Blu Cantrell; Musiq Soulchild
**Country Category**
Favorite Country Male Artist	**Tim McGraw**	Toby Keith; Travis Tritt
Favorite Country Female Artist	**Faith Hill**	Sara Evans; Jo Dee Messina
Favorite Country Band/Duo/Group	**Brooks & Dunn**	Lonestar; SheDaisy
Favorite Country Album	**Set This Circus Down** - **Tim McGraw**	Steers & Stripes - Brooks & Dunn; I'm Already There - Lonestar
Favorite Country New Artist	**Trick Pony**	Jamie O'Neal; Blake Shelton
**Adult Contemporary Category**
Favorite Adult Contemporary Artist	**Sade**	Enya; LeAnn Rimes
**Alternative Category**
Favorite Alternative Artist	**Limp Bizkit**	Linkin Park; Staind
**Rap/Hip-Hop Category**
Favorite Rap/Hip-Hop Artist	**Nelly**	Ja Rule; Shaggy
**Latin Category**
Favorite Latin Artist	**Enrique Iglesias**	Shakira; Jaci Velasquez
**Soundtrack Category**
Favorite Soundtrack	**Save The Last Dance**	American Pie 2 Moulin Rouge!
**1st Coca-Cola New Music Award**
Coca-Cola New Music Award	**Carbon Leaf**	Live Honey; Yo, Flaco!
**Award of Merit**
**Garth Brooks**
**Artist of the Century Award**
**Michael Jackson**
