= American Music Awards of 2005 =

US television program

33rd Annual American Music Awards
- Date: November 22, 2005
- Location: Shrine Auditorium, Los Angeles, California
- Country: United States
- Presented by: Cedric the Entertainer
- Most awards: Green Day, Tim McGraw, The Black Eyed Peas, Kelly Clarkson and Destiny's Child (2 each)
- Most nominations: Mariah Carey (5)

Television/radio coverage
- Network: ABC (November 22, 2005); Trans TV (November 26, 2005)
- Runtime: 180 min.
- Produced by: Dick Clark Productions

The 33rd Annual American Music Awards were held on November 22, 2005. They were hosted by Cedric the Entertainer. The awards recognized the most popular albums and artists from the year 2005.

== Performances ==
| Artist | Song |
|---|---|
| Mariah Carey | "Don't Forget About Us" |
| Kenny Chesney | "I Go Back" |
| Rob Thomas | "Ever the Same" |
| Lindsay Lohan | "Confessions of a Broken Heart (Daughter to Father)" "Edge of Seventeen" |
| Pharrell; Gwen Stefani | "Can I Have It Like That" |
| Hilary Duff | "Beat of My Heart" |
| Keith Urban | "You'll Think of Me" |
| Cyndi Lauper; Sarah McLachlan | "Time After Time" |
| Bow Wow; Ciara | "Like You" |
| Omarion | "O" |
| Bow Wow; Omarion | "Let Me Hold You" |
| Los Lonely Boys; Santana | "I Don't Wanna Lose Your Love" |
| Sheryl Crow | "Good Is Good" |
| Tim McGraw | "Real Good Man" |
| Eurythmics | "Missionary Man" "Sweet Dreams (Are Made of This)" |
| Rascal Flatts | "Me and My Gang" |
| The All-American Rejects | "Dirty Little Secret" |
| The Rolling Stones^{[a]} | "Rain Fall Down" "It's Only Rock 'n Roll (But I Like It)" |

Notes

- ^{^[a]} Broadcast live from the Delta Center, Salt Lake City.

== Winners and nominees ==
| Artist of the Year | New Artist of the Year |
|---|---|
| Kelly Clarkson; 50 Cent; Mariah Carey; Green Day; Toby Keith; Gwen Stefani | Sugarland; The Killers; Jesse McCartney |
| Favorite Pop/Rock Male Artist | Favorite Pop/Rock Female Artist |
| Will Smith; 50 Cent; Rob Thomas | Gwen Stefani; Mariah Carey; Kelly Clarkson |
| Favorite Pop/Rock Band/Duo/Group | Favorite Pop/Rock Album |
| The Black Eyed Peas; 3 Doors Down; Green Day | Green Day - American Idiot; Mariah Carey - The Emancipation of Mimi; Kelly Clarkson - Breakaway |
| Favorite Country Male Artist | Favorite Country Female Artist |
| Tim McGraw; Kenny Chesney; Toby Keith | Gretchen Wilson; Martina McBride; LeAnn Rimes |
| Favorite Country Band/Duo/Group | Favorite Country Album |
| Brooks & Dunn; Big & Rich; Rascal Flatts | Tim McGraw - Live Like You Were Dying; Toby Keith - Honkytonk University; Gretchen Wilson - Here for the Party |
| Favorite Soul/R&B Male Artist | Favorite Soul/R&B Female Artist |
| R. Kelly; John Legend; Omarion | Mariah Carey; Ciara; Fantasia |
| Favorite Soul/R&B Band/Duo/Group | Favorite Soul/R&B Album |
| Destiny's Child; 112; Pretty Ricky | Destiny's Child - Destiny Fulfilled; Fantasia - Free Yourself; Mariah Carey - The Emancipation of Mimi |
| Favorite Rap/Hip-Hop Male Artist | Favorite Rap/Hip-Hop Female Artist |
| Eminem; 50 Cent; Ludacris | Missy Elliott; Lil' Kim; Trina |
| Favorite Rap/Hip-Hop Band/Duo/Group | Favorite Rap/Hip-Hop Album |
| The Black Eyed Peas; Lil Jon and the East Side Boyz; Ying Yang Twins | 50 Cent - The Massacre; Eminem - Encore; T.I. - Urban Legend |
| Favorite Adult Contemporary Artist | Favorite Alternative Artist |
| Kelly Clarkson; John Mayer; Maroon 5 | Green Day; Coldplay; System of a Down |
| Favorite Latin Artist | Favorite Contemporary Inspirational Artist |
| Shakira; Daddy Yankee; Luis Miguel | Mary Mary; Casting Crowns; Jars of Clay |
