= American Music Awards of 2007 =

US television program

35th Annual American Music Awards
- Date: November 18, 2007
- Location: Peacock Theater, Los Angeles, California
- Country: United States
- Hosted by: Jimmy Kimmel
- Most awards: Carrie Underwood & Daughtry (3)
- Most nominations: Daughtry (4)
- Website: ABC-American Music Awards

Television/radio coverage
- Network: ABC (November 18, 2007); RCTI (November 24, 2007)
- Runtime: 180 min.
- Produced by: Dick Clark Productions

The 35th Annual American Music Awards took place on November 18, 2007 at the Nokia Theatre L.A. Live in Los Angeles, California. The ceremony was hosted by Jimmy Kimmel.

== Performers ==
Artist(s)	Song(s)
Pre-show
The Cheetah Girls	"Showstopper"
Main show
RAIN	"I'm comming"
Daughtry	"Home"
Duran Duran	"Falling Down"
Fergie	"Fergalicious" "Clumsy" "Big Girls Don't Cry"
Celine Dion	"Taking Chances"
Alicia Keys; Junior Reid; Beenie Man; Chaka Demus and Pliers	"No One"
Jonas Brothers	"SOS"
Avril Lavigne	"Hot"
Maroon 5	"Won't Go Home Without You"
Rascal Flatts	"Take Me There"
Rihanna; Ne-Yo	"Umbrella" "Hate That I Love You"
will.i.am	"Heartbreaker"
Nicole Scherzinger will.i.am	"Baby Love"
Mary J. Blige	"Just Fine"
Sugarland; Beyoncé	"Irreplaceable"
Queen Latifah	"I Know Where I've Been"
Lenny Kravitz	"I'll Be Waiting"

== Winners and nominees ==
Winners are highlighted in boldface.

Artist of the Year (T-Mobile Text-In Award)	New Artist of the Year
**Carrie Underwood**; Akon; Daughtry; Fergie; Norah Jones	**Daughtry**; Plain White T's; Robin Thicke
Favorite Pop/Rock Male Artist	Favorite Pop/Rock Female Artist
**Justin Timberlake**; Akon; Timbaland	**Fergie**; Beyoncé; Avril Lavigne
Favorite Pop/Rock Band/Duo/Group	Favorite Pop/Rock Album
**Nickelback**; Maroon 5; Linkin Park	**Daughtry** **- Daughtry**; Minutes To Midnight - Linkin Park; FutureSex/LoveSounds - Justin Timberlake
Favorite Country Male Artist	Favorite Country Female Artist
**Tim McGraw**; Toby Keith; Brad Paisley	**Carrie Underwood**; Martina McBride; Taylor Swift
Favorite Country Band/Duo/Group	Favorite Country Album
**Rascal Flatts**; Big & Rich; Brooks & Dunn	**Some Hearts** **- Carrie Underwood**; Let It Go - Tim McGraw; Me and My Gang - Rascal Flatts
Favorite Soul/R&B Male Artist	Favorite Soul/R&B Female Artist
**Akon**; Ne-Yo; T-Pain	**Rihanna**; Beyoncé; Fantasia
Favorite Soul/R&B Album	Favorite Rap/Hip-Hop Band/Duo/Group
**FutureSex/LoveSounds - Justin Timberlake**; B'Day - Beyoncé; Double Up - R. Kelly	**Bone Thugs-n-Harmony**; Pretty Ricky; Shop Boyz
Favorite Rap/Hip-Hop Artist	Favorite Rap/Hip-Hop Album
**T.I.**; Young Jeezy; Fabolous	**T.I. vs. T.I.P. – T.I.**; Strength & Loyalty – Bone Thugs-n-Harmony; The Inspiration – Young Jeezy
Favorite Alternative Artist	Favorite Adult Contemporary Artist
**Linkin Park**; The White Stripes; My Chemical Romance	**Daughtry**; John Mayer; Norah Jones
Favorite Latin Artist	Favorite Contemporary Inspirational Artist
**Jennifer Lopez**; Daddy Yankee; Juan Luis Guerra	**Casting Crowns**; Jeremy Camp; tobyMac
Favorite Soundtrack	International Artist Award
**High School Musical 2**; Hairspray; Dreamgirls	**Beyoncé**
