= American Music Awards of 2003 (January) =

US award ceremony

30th Annual American Music Awards
- Date: January 13, 2003
- Location: Shrine Auditorium, Los Angeles, California
- Country: United States
- Hosted by: Ozzy Osbourne; Sharon Osbourne; Jack Osbourne; Kelly Osbourne

Highlights
- Most awards: Eminem (4)
- Most nominations: Ashanti (6)

Television/radio coverage
- Network: ABC
- Runtime: 180 min.
- Produced by: Dick Clark Productions

The 30th Annual American Music Awards were held on January 13, 2003, at the Shrine Auditorium, in Los Angeles, California. The awards recognized the most popular artists and albums from the year 2002.

All nominees are listed below, and the winners are listed in bold.

== Performances ==
Artist(s)	Song(s)
Tim McGraw; Elton John	"Tiny Dancer"
Matchbox Twenty	"Disease"
Christina Aguilera; Linda Perry (on piano)	"Impossible" "Beautiful"
B2K	"Bump, Bump, Bump"
Shania Twain	"I'm Gonna Getcha Good!" "Up!"
Nickelback	"How You Remind Me"
Mariah Carey	"Through the Rain"
Ja Rule; Bobby Brown	"Thug Lovin'"
Kenny Chesney	"Young"
Kelly Osbourne	"Shut Up"
Missy Elliott	"Work It"
Toby Keith; Willie Nelson	"Beer For My Horses"

== Winners and nominees ==
Subcategory	Winner	Nominees
**Michael Jackson International Artist of the Year**
Artist of the Year	**Madonna**	Christina Aguilera; Cher; Shania Twain; Justin Timberlake
**Fan's Choice Award**
Fan's Choice Award	**Nelly**	Ashanti; Creed; Eminem; Enrique Iglesias
**Pop/Rock Category**
Favorite Pop/Rock Male Artist	**Eminem**	Enrique Iglesias; Nelly
Favorite Pop/Rock Female Artist	**Sheryl Crow**	Celine Dion; Pink
Favorite Pop/Rock Band/Duo/Group	**Creed**	Linkin Park; Nickelback
Favorite Pop/Rock Album	**The Eminem Show** - **Eminem**	Ashanti - Ashanti; Nellyville - Nelly; Missundaztood - Pink
Favorite Pop/Rock New Artist	**Ashanti**	Kelly Clarkson; Puddle of Mudd
**Hip-Hop/R&B Category**
Favorite Hip-Hop/R&B Female Artist	**Mary J. Blige**	Ashanti; Jennifer Lopez
Favorite Hip-Hop/R&B Male Artist	**Eminem**	Ja Rule; Nelly
Favorite Hip-Hop/R&B Band/Duo/Group	**Outkast**	B2K; Nappy Roots
Favorite Hip-Hop/R&B Album	**The Eminem Show** - **Eminem**	Ashanti - Ashanti; Word of Mouf - Ludacris; Nellyville - Nelly
Favorite Hip-Hop/R&B New Artist	**Ashanti**	B2K; Nappy Roots
**Country Category**
Favorite Country Male Artist	**Tim McGraw**	Alan Jackson; Toby Keith
Favorite Country Female Artist	**Martina McBride**	Jo Dee Messina; Lee Ann Womack
Favorite Country Band/Duo/Group	**Dixie Chicks**	Brooks & Dunn; Lonestar
Favorite Country Album	**Home** - **Dixie Chicks**	No Shoes, No Shirt, No Problems - Kenny Chesney; Drive - Alan Jackson; Unleashed - Toby Keith
Favorite Country New Artist	**Carolyn Dawn Johnson**	Kellie Coffey; Tommy Shane Steiner
**Adult Contemporary Category**
Favorite Adult Contemporary Artist	**Celine Dion**	Vanessa Carlton; Five for Fighting
**Alternative Category**
Favorite Alternative Artist	**Creed**	Linkin Park; System of a Down
**Latin Category**
Favorite Latin Artist	**Enrique Iglesias**	Marc Anthony; Shakira
**Soundtrack Category**
Favorite Soundtrack	**Spider-Man**	Lilo & Stitch; The Scorpion King
**Inspirational Category**
Favorite Contemporary Inspirational Artist	**Avalon**	Jars of Clay; P.O.D.
**2nd Coca-Cola New Music Award**
Coca-Cola New Music Award	**Moe Loughran**	Honeycomb; Moe Loughran; Terell
**Merit**
**Alabama**
