= American Music Award for Best Hip-Hop Album =

American music award

American Music Awards for Best Hip-Hop Album
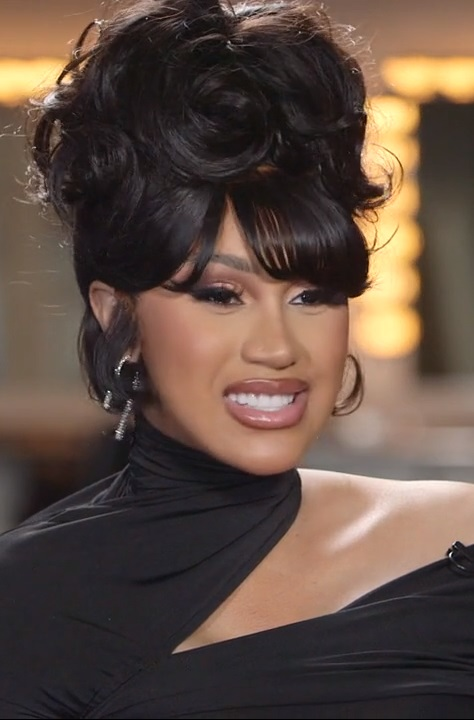
- Am I the Drama? by Cardi B is the most recent recipient.
- Country: United States
- Presented by: American Music Awards
- First award: 1989
- Currently held by: Cardi B – Am I the Drama?

Highlights
- Most wins: Nicki Minaj; Eminem; (3 each)
- Most nominations: Drake (9)
- Website: theamas.com

The American Music Award for Best Hip-Hop Album (formerly Favorite Album – Rap/Hip Hop 1989-2025) has been awarded since 1989. Years reflect in the year in which the awards were presented, for works released in the previous year (until 2003 onward where awards were handed out on November of the same year). Drake has the most nominations with 9.

== Winners and nominees ==
=== 1980s ===
Year	Artist	Album	Ref
1989 (16th)
1989 (16th)	DJ Jazzy Jeff & The Fresh Prince	He's the DJ, I'm the Rapper	
1989 (16th)	Public Enemy	It Takes a Nation of Millions to Hold Us Back	
1989 (16th)	Run–D.M.C.	Tougher Than Leather	

=== 1990s ===
Year	Artist	Album	Ref
1990 (17th)
1990 (17th)	MC Hammer	Let's Get It Started	
1990 (17th)	Eazy-E	Eazy-Duz-It	
1990 (17th)	Tone Lōc	Lōc-ed After Dark	
1991 (18th)
1991 (18th)	MC Hammer	Please Hammer, Don't Hurt 'Em	
1991 (18th)	Public Enemy	Fear of a Black Planet	
1991 (18th)	Vanilla Ice	To the Extreme	
1992 (19th)
1992 (19th)	DJ Jazzy Jeff & The Fresh Prince	Homebase	
1992 (19th)	LL Cool J	Mama Said Knock You Out	
1992 (19th)	Public Enemy	Apocalypse 91... The Enemy Strikes Black	
1993 – 1999	—N/a		

=== 2000s ===
Year	Artist	Album	Ref
2000 – 2002	—N/a		
2003 (30th)
2003 (30th)	Eminem	The Eminem Show	
2003 (30th)	Ashanti	Ashanti	
2003 (30th)	Ludacris	Word of Mouf	
2003 (30th)	Nelly	Nellyville	
2003 (31st)
2003 (31st)	50 Cent	Get Rich or Die Tryin'	
2003 (31st)	Missy Elliott	Under Construction	
2003 (31st)	Eminem	8 Mile: Music from and Inspired by the Motion Picture	
2003 (31st)	Sean Paul	Dutty Rock	
2004 (32nd)
2004 (32nd)	Outkast	Speakerboxxx/The Love Below	
2004 (32nd)	Jay-Z	The Black Album	
2004 (32nd)	Kanye West	The College Dropout	
2005 (33rd)
2005 (33rd)	50 Cent	The Massacre	
2005 (33rd)	Eminem	Encore	
2005 (33rd)	T.I.	Urban Legend	
2006 (34th)
2006 (34th)	The Black Eyed Peas	Monkey Business	
2006 (34th)	Eminem	Curtain Call: The Hits	
2006 (34th)	T.I.	King	
2007 (35th)
2007 (35th)	T.I.	T.I. vs. T.I.P.	
2007 (35th)	Bone Thugs-n-Harmony	Strength & Loyalty	
2007 (35th)	Young Jeezy	The Inspiration	
2008 (36th)
2008 (36th)	Kanye West	Graduation	
2008 (36th)	Jay-Z	American Gangster	
2008 (36th)	Lil Wayne	Tha Carter III	
2009 (37th)
2009 (37th)	Jay-Z	The Blueprint 3	
2009 (37th)	Eminem	Relapse	
2009 (37th)	T.I.	Paper Trail	

=== 2010s ===
Year	Artist	Album	Ref
2010 (38th)
2010 (38th)	Eminem	Recovery	
2010 (38th)	B.o.B	B.o.B Presents: The Adventures of Bobby Ray	
2010 (38th)	Drake	Thank Me Later	
2011 (39th)
2011 (39th)	Nicki Minaj	Pink Friday	
2011 (39th)	Jay-Z and Kanye West	Watch the Throne	
2011 (39th)	Lil Wayne	Tha Carter IV	
2012 (40th)
2012 (40th)	Nicki Minaj	Pink Friday: Roman Reloaded	
2012 (40th)	Drake	Take Care	
2012 (40th)	J. Cole	Cole World: The Sideline Story	
2013 (41st)
2013 (41st)	Macklemore & Ryan Lewis	The Heist	
2013 (41st)	Jay-Z	Magna Carta Holy Grail	
2013 (41st)	Kendrick Lamar	Good Kid, M.A.A.D City	
2014 (42nd)
2014 (42nd)	Iggy Azalea	The New Classic	
2014 (42nd)	Drake	Nothing Was the Same	
2014 (42nd)	Eminem	The Marshall Mathers LP 2	
2015 (43rd)
2015 (43rd)	Nicki Minaj	The Pinkprint	
2015 (43rd)	Drake	If You're Reading This It's Too Late	
2015 (43rd)	J. Cole	2014 Forest Hills Drive	
2016 (44th)
2016 (44th)	Drake	Views	
2016 (44th)	Drake and Future	What a Time to Be Alive	
2016 (44th)	Fetty Wap	Fetty Wap	
2017 (45th)
2017 (45th)	Kendrick Lamar	Damn	
2017 (45th)	Drake	More Life	
2017 (45th)	Migos	Culture	
2018 (46th)
2018 (46th)	Post Malone	Beerbongs & Bentleys	
2018 (46th)	Drake	Scorpion	
2018 (46th)	Lil Uzi Vert	Luv Is Rage 2	
2019 (47th)
2019 (47th)	Post Malone	Hollywood's Bleeding	
2019 (47th)	Meek Mill	Championships	
2019 (47th)	Travis Scott	Astroworld	

=== 2020s ===
Year	Artist	Album	Ref
2020 (48th)
2020 (48th)	Roddy Ricch	Please Excuse Me for Being Antisocial	
2020 (48th)	Lil Baby	My Turn	
2020 (48th)	Lil Uzi Vert	Eternal Atake	
2021 (49th)
2021 (49th)	Megan Thee Stallion	Good News	
2021 (49th)	Drake	Certified Lover Boy	
2021 (49th)	Juice Wrld	Legends Never Die	
2021 (49th)	Pop Smoke	Shoot for the Stars, Aim for the Moon	
2021 (49th)	Rod Wave	SoulFly	
2022 (50th)
2022 (50th)	Kendrick Lamar	Mr. Morale & the Big Steppers	
2022 (50th)	Future	I Never Liked You	
2022 (50th)	Gunna	DS4Ever	
2022 (50th)	Lil Durk	7220	
2022 (50th)	Polo G	Hall of Fame 2.0	
2023 – 24	—N/a		
2025 (51st)
2025 (51st)	Eminem	The Death of Slim Shady (Coup de Grâce)	
2025 (51st)	Future and Metro Boomin	We Don't Trust You	
2025 (51st)	Gunna	One of Wun	
2025 (51st)	Kendrick Lamar	GNX	
2025 (51st)	Tyler, the Creator	Chromakopia	
2026 (52nd)
2026 (52nd)	Cardi B	Am I the Drama?	
2026 (52nd)	Don Toliver	Octane	
2026 (52nd)	Gunna	The Last Wun	
2026 (52nd)	Playboi Carti	Music	
2026 (52nd)	YoungBoy Never Broke Again	MASA	

== Category facts ==
=== Multiple wins ===
3 wins

- Eminem
- Nicki Minaj

2 wins

- 50 Cent
- DJ Jazzy Jeff & The Fresh Prince
- MC Hammer
- Post Malone
- Kendrick Lamar

=== Multiple nominations ===
9 nominations

- Drake

8 nominations

- Eminem

5 nominations

- Jay-Z

4 nominations

- Kendrick Lamar
- T.I.

3 nominations

- Future
- Gunna
- Nicki Minaj
- Public Enemy
- Kanye West

2 nominations

- Post Malone
- 50 Cent
- J. Cole
- DJ Jazzy Jeff & The Fresh Prince
- Lil Uzi Vert
- Lil Wayne
- MC Hammer
