= American Music Award for Song of the Year =

American music award

American Music Awards for Song of the Year
- Country: United States
- Presented by: American Music Awards
- First award: 2013
- Currently held by: Huntrix: Ejae, Audrey Nuna and Rei Ami – "Golden"

Highlights
- Most nominations: Bruno Mars; Pharrell Williams; Sabrina Carpenter; Taylor Swift; (2 each)
- Website: theamas.com

The American Music Award for Song of the Year initially awarded as Single of the Year was awarded from 2013. In 2016, the category was divided to honor songs by their separate genres. Years reflect the year in which the awards were presented, for works released the previous year (until 2003 onward, when awards were handed out in November of the same year). Bruno Mars, Pharrell Williams, Sabrina Carpenter, and Taylor Swift are the most nominated artists with 2 nominations each.

== Winners and nominees ==
=== 2010s ===
Year	Artist	Song	Ref
2013 (41st)
2013 (41st)	Florida Georgia Line (featuring Nelly)	"Cruise"	
2013 (41st)	Macklemore & Ryan Lewis (featuring Wanz)	"Thrift Shop"	
2013 (41st)	Robin Thicke (featuring Pharrell Williams and T.I.)	"Blurred Lines"	
2014 (42nd)
2014 (42nd)	Katy Perry (featuring Juicy J)	"Dark Horse"	
2014 (42nd)	Iggy Azalea (featuring Charli XCX)	"Fancy"	
2014 (42nd)	John Legend	"All of Me"	
2014 (42nd)	Magic!	"Rude"	
2014 (42nd)	Pharrell Williams	"Happy"	
2015 (43rd)
2015 (43rd)	Taylor Swift	"Blank Space"	
2015 (43rd)	Wiz Khalifa (featuring Charlie Puth)	"See You Again"	
2015 (43rd)	Mark Ronson (featuring Bruno Mars)	"Uptown Funk"	
2015 (43rd)	Ed Sheeran	"Thinking Out Loud"	
2015 (43rd)	The Weeknd	"Can't Feel My Face"	
2016 – 19	—N/a		

=== 2020s ===
Year	Artist	Song	Ref
2020 – 24	—N/a		
2025 (51st)
2025 (51st)	Billie Eilish	"Birds of a Feather"	
2025 (51st)	Benson Boone	"Beautiful Things"	
2025 (51st)	Chappell Roan	"Good Luck, Babe!"	
2025 (51st)	Hozier	"Too Sweet"	
2025 (51st)	Kendrick Lamar	"Not Like Us"	
2025 (51st)	Lady Gaga and Bruno Mars	"Die with a Smile"	
2025 (51st)	Post Malone (featuring Morgan Wallen)	"I Had Some Help"	
2025 (51st)	Sabrina Carpenter	"Espresso"	
2025 (51st)	Shaboozey	"A Bar Song (Tipsy)"	
2025 (51st)	Teddy Swims	"Lose Control"	
2026 (52nd)
2026 (52nd)	Huntrix: Ejae, Audrey Nuna and Rei Ami	"Golden"	
2026 (52nd)	Alex Warren	"Ordinary"	
2026 (52nd)	Ella Langley	"Choosin' Texas"	
2026 (52nd)	Kehlani	"Folded"	
2026 (52nd)	Leon Thomas	"Mutt"	
2026 (52nd)	Olivia Dean	"Man I Need"	
2026 (52nd)	Sabrina Carpenter	"Manchild"	
2026 (52nd)	Sombr	"Back to Friends"	
2026 (52nd)	Taylor Swift	"The Fate of Ophelia"	

== Category facts ==
=== Multiple Nominations ===
2 nominations

- Bruno Mars
- Pharrell Williams
- Sabrina Carpenter
- Taylor Swift

== See also ==
- American Music Award for Favorite Pop/Rock Song (1974–1995, 2016–present)
- American Music Award for Favorite Soul/R&B Song (1974–1995, 2016–present)
- American Music Award for Favorite Country Song (1974–1995, 2016–present)
- American Music Award for Favorite Disco Song (1979)
- American Music Award for Favorite Pop/Rock Song (1990–1992)
- American Music Award for Favorite Rap/Hip-Hop Song (2016–present)
