= American Music Awards of 2025 =

2025 music awards ceremony

- Date: May 26, 2025
- Venue: Fontainebleau Las Vegas; Winchester, Nevada
- Country: United States
- Hosted by: Jennifer Lopez

Highlights
- Most wins: Billie Eilish (7)
- Most nominations: Kendrick Lamar (10)
- Website: theamas.com

Television/radio coverage
- Network: CBS; Paramount+
- Viewership: 4.73 million
- Produced by: Dick Clark Productions

The 51st Annual American Music Awards were held on May 26, 2025, at the BleuLive Theater at the Fontainebleau Las Vegas. This was the first award ceremony to broadcast on CBS, and stream on Paramount+. Jennifer Lopez hosted for the second time following the 2015 ceremony.

Nominations were announced in April 2025; Kendrick Lamar led with ten. Billie Eilish was the most awarded artist, winning all seven of her nominations. Janet Jackson was honored with the Icon Award, Rod Stewart with the Lifetime Achievement Award, and Zac Brown with the inaugural Veterans Voice Award.

== Background ==
The American Music Awards were last broadcast on ABC back in 2022. In March 2023, it was announced that the Billboard Music Awards, which are also produced by Dick Clark Productions (DCP) via co-owned Billboard, had been moved from May to the November scheduling that was typically occupied by the American Music Awards, leading to speculation that the AMAs would be discontinued in order to focus on the Billboard Music Awards, or at the very least cancelled in 2023, so it could move to May in its place. It was reported that the broadcast rights for both events (which had been held by NBC and ABC, respectively) would also be shopped; the Billboard Music Awards moved to an online only event in November 2023.

In March 2024, it was announced that CBS had acquired the rights to broadcast the AMAs under a multi-year deal of unspecified length. In August 2024, DCP announced that the 51st American Music Awards would be held in May 2025 in Las Vegas, while CBS would air an AMAs 50th anniversary special on October 6, 2024. In February 2025, it was announced that the 51st American Music Awards would be held on May 26, 2025. In April 2025, Jennifer Lopez was announced as host of the ceremony, marking her second AMAs since 2015. On May 8, 2025, it was announced that the ceremony would be held at the Fontainebleau Las Vegas.

== Performances ==
Janet Jackson was announced as a performer on May 13, 2025. Additional performers were announced two days later.

Performers at the American Music Awards of 2025
| Performer(s) | Song(s) |
|---|---|
| Jennifer Lopez | "Dance Again"; Dance Medley: 1. "Squabble Up" by Kendrick Lamar; 2. "Denial Is a River" by Doechii; 3. "A Bar Song (Tipsy)" by Shaboozey; 4. "APT." by Rosé feat. Bruno Mars; 5. "I Had Some Help" by Post Malone feat. Morgan Wallen; 6. "Hot to Go!" by Chappell Roan; 7. "Good Luck, Babe!" by Chappell Roan; 8. "Birds of a Feather" by Billie Eilish; 9. "Texas Hold' Em" by Beyoncé; 10. "Nuevayol" by Bad Bunny; 11. "Beautiful Things" by Benson Boone; 12. "Lose Control" by Teddy Swims; 13. "Die with a Smile" by Lady Gaga & Bruno Mars; 14. "Nasty" by Tinashe; 15. "Espresso" by Sabrina Carpenter; 16. "Sports Car" by Tate McRae; 17. "Guess" by Charli XCX feat. Billie Eilish; 18. "Not Like Us / TV Off" by Kendrick Lamar |
| Blake Shelton | "Stay Country or Die Tryin'" |
| Benson Boone | "Mystical Magical" |
| Lainey Wilson | "Somewhere Over Laredo" |
| Gwen Stefani | "Swallow My Tears" "The Sweet Escape" "Hollaback Girl" |
| Janet Jackson | "Control" (intro) "Someone to Call My Lover" "All for You" |
| Reneé Rapp | "Leave Me Alone" |
| Gloria Estefan | "Rhythm Is Gonna Get You" "La Vecina (No Sé Na')" "Conga" |
| Alex Warren | "Ordinary" |
| Becky G Manuel Turizo | "Que Haces" |
| Rod Stewart | "Forever Young" |

== Presenters ==
Presenters were announced on May 21, 2025.

- Tiffany Haddish – presented Favorite R&B Song
- Wayne Brady and Jordan Chiles – presented Favorite Female Latin Artist
- Nikki Glaser – presented New Artist of the Year
- Dan + Shay – introduced Lainey Wilson
- Alix Earle and Kai Cenat – presented Favorite Female R&B Artist
- Blake Shelton – introduced Gwen Stefani
- Zac Brown – introduced Easy Day Foundation
- Tasha Smith – presented the Icon Award to Janet Jackson
- Jake Shane – introduced Reneé Rapp
- Heidi Klum – presented Favorite Male Hip-Hop Artist
- Shaboozey and Megan Moroney – presented Favorite Country Duo or Group
- Ciara – introduced Alex Warren
- Jon Batiste – presented Artist of the Year
- Children of Rod Stewart – introduced and presented the Lifetime Achievement Award to their father

== Winners and nominees ==
The nominations were announced on April 23, 2025. Kendrick Lamar received the most nominations with ten, followed by Post Malone with eight nominations. Billie Eilish, Chappell Roan, and Shaboozey received seven nominations each, and Bruno Mars, Lady Gaga, Morgan Wallen, Sabrina Carpenter, SZA, and Taylor Swift with six nominations each. Eilish won the most awards, securing all seven of her nominations. She is followed by Gaga and Mars with three awards each, while Malone, SZA, the Weeknd, Bad Bunny, Beyoncé, Eminem, and Twenty One Pilots won two each.

Winners are listed first and highlighted in bold.

| Artist of the Year | New Artist of the Year |
|---|---|
| **Billie Eilish**; Ariana Grande; Chappell Roan; Kendrick Lamar; Morgan Wallen; Post Malone; Sabrina Carpenter; SZA; Taylor Swift; Zach Bryan | **Gracie Abrams**; Benson Boone; Chappell Roan; Shaboozey; Teddy Swims; Tommy Richman |
| Album of the Year | Song of the Year |
| **Billie Eilish – Hit Me Hard and Soft**; Beyoncé – Cowboy Carter; Chappell Roan – The Rise and Fall of a Midwest Princess; Charli XCX – Brat; Gracie Abrams – The Secret of Us; Future and Metro Boomin – We Don't Trust You; Kendrick Lamar – GNX; Post Malone – F-1 Trillion; Sabrina Carpenter – Short n' Sweet; Taylor Swift – The Tortured Poets Department | **Billie Eilish – "Birds of a Feather"**; Benson Boone – "Beautiful Things"; Chappell Roan – "Good Luck, Babe!"; Hozier – "Too Sweet"; Kendrick Lamar – "Not Like Us"; Lady Gaga and Bruno Mars – "Die with a Smile"; Post Malone featuring Morgan Wallen – "I Had Some Help"; Sabrina Carpenter – "Espresso"; Shaboozey – "A Bar Song (Tipsy)"; Teddy Swims – "Lose Control" |
| Collaboration of the Year | Social Song of the Year |
| **Lady Gaga and Bruno Mars – "Die with a Smile"**; Kendrick Lamar and SZA – "Luther"; Marshmello and Kane Brown – "Miles on It"; Post Malone featuring Morgan Wallen – "I Had Some Help"; Rosé and Bruno Mars – "APT."; Taylor Swift featuring Post Malone – "Fortnight" | **Doechii – "Anxiety"**; Chappell Roan – "Hot to Go!"; Djo – "End of Beginning"; Lola Young – "Messy"; Shaboozey – "A Bar Song (Tipsy)"; Tommy Richman – "Million Dollar Baby" |
| Favorite Touring Artist | Favorite Music Video |
| **Billie Eilish**; Luke Combs; Morgan Wallen; Taylor Swift; Zach Bryan | **Lady Gaga and Bruno Mars – "Die with a Smile"**; Benson Boone – "Beautiful Things; Karol G – "Si Antes Te Hubiera Conocido"; Kendrick Lamar – "Not Like Us"; Shaboozey – "A Bar Song (Tipsy)" |
| Favorite Male Pop Artist | Favorite Female Pop Artist |
| **Bruno Mars**; Benson Boone; Hozier; Teddy Swims; The Weeknd | **Billie Eilish**; Chappell Roan; Lady Gaga; Sabrina Carpenter; Taylor Swift |
| Favorite Pop Album | Favorite Pop Song |
| **Billie Eilish – Hit Me Hard and Soft**; Chappell Roan – The Rise and Fall of a Midwest Princess; Charli XCX – Brat; Sabrina Carpenter – Short n' Sweet; Taylor Swift – The Tortured Poets Department | **Billie Eilish – "Birds of a Feather"**; Benson Boone – "Beautiful Things"; Lady Gaga and Bruno Mars – "Die with a Smile"; Sabrina Carpenter – "Espresso"; Teddy Swims – "Lose Control" |
| Favorite Male Country Artist | Favorite Female Country Artist |
| **Post Malone**; Jelly Roll; Luke Combs; Morgan Wallen; Shaboozey | **Beyoncé**; Ella Langley; Kacey Musgraves; Lainey Wilson; Megan Moroney |
| Favorite Country Duo or Group | Favorite Country Album |
| **Dan + Shay**; Old Dominion; Parmalee; The Red Clay Strays; Zac Brown Band | **Beyoncé – Cowboy Carter**; Jelly Roll – Beautifully Broken; Megan Moroney – Am I Okay?; Post Malone – F-1 Trillion; Shaboozey – Where I've Been, Isn't Where I'm Going |
| Favorite Country Song | Favorite Male Hip-Hop Artist |
| **Post Malone featuring Morgan Wallen – "I Had Some Help"**; Jelly Roll – "I Am Not Okay"; Koe Wetzel featuring Jessie Murph – "High Road"; Luke Combs – "Ain't No Love in Oklahoma"; Shaboozey – "A Bar Song (Tipsy)" | **Eminem**; Drake; Future; Kendrick Lamar; Tyler, the Creator |
| Favorite Female Hip-Hop Artist | Favorite Hip-Hop Album |
| **Megan Thee Stallion**; Doechii; GloRilla; Latto; Sexyy Red | **Eminem – The Death of Slim Shady (Coup de Grâce)**; Future and Metro Boomin – We Don't Trust You; Gunna – One of Wun; Kendrick Lamar – GNX; Tyler, the Creator – Chromakopia |
| Favorite Hip-Hop Song | Favorite Male R&B Artist |
| **Kendrick Lamar – "Not Like Us"**; Future, Metro Boomin, and Kendrick Lamar – "Like That"; GloRilla – "TGIF"; GloRilla and Sexyy Red – "Whatchu Kno About Me"; Kendrick Lamar and SZA – "Luther" | **The Weeknd**; Bryson Tiller; Chris Brown; PartyNextDoor; Usher |
| Favorite Female R&B Artist | Favorite R&B Album |
| **SZA**; Kehlani; Muni Long; Summer Walker; Tyla | **The Weeknd – Hurry Up Tomorrow**; Bryson Tiller – Bryson Tiller; PartyNextDoor – PartyNextDoor 4; PartyNextDoor and Drake – Some Sexy Songs 4 U; SZA – Lana |
| Favorite R&B Song | Favorite Male Latin Artist |
| **SZA – "Saturn"**; Chris Brown – "Residuals"; Muni Long – "Made for Me"; The Weeknd and Playboi Carti – "Timeless"; Tommy Richman – "Million Dollar Baby" | **Bad Bunny**; Feid; Peso Pluma; Rauw Alejandro; Tito Double P |
| Favorite Female Latin Artist | Favorite Latin Duo or Group |
| **Becky G**; Karol G; Natti Natasha; Shakira; Young Miko | **Julión Álvarez**; Calibre 50; Fuerza Regida; Grupo Firme; Grupo Frontera |
| Favorite Latin Album | Favorite Latin Song |
| **Bad Bunny – Debí Tirar Más Fotos**; Fuerza Regida – Dolido Pero No Arrepentido; Peso Pluma – Éxodo; Rauw Alejandro – Cosa Nuestra; Tito Double P – Incómodo | **Shakira – "Soltera"**; Bad Bunny – "DTMF"; FloyyMenor and Cris MJ – "Gata Only"; Karol G – "Si Antes Te Hubiera Conocido"; Óscar Maydon and Fuerza Regida – "Tu Boda" |
| Favorite Rock Artist | Favorite Rock Song |
| **Twenty One Pilots**; Linkin Park; Pearl Jam; Hozier; Zach Bryan | **Linkin Park – "The Emptiness Machine"**; Green Day – "Dilemma"; Hozier – "Too Sweet"; Myles Smith – "Stargazing"; Zach Bryan – "Pink Skies" |
| Favorite Rock Album | Favorite Dance/Electronic Artist |
| **Twenty One Pilots – Clancy**; Koe Wetzel – 9 Lives; The Marías – Submarine; Hozier – Unreal Unearth; Zach Bryan – The Great American Bar Scene | **Lady Gaga**; Charli XCX; David Guetta; John Summit; Marshmello |
| Favorite Soundtrack | Favorite Afrobeats Artist |
| **Arcane League of Legends: Season 2**; Hazbin Hotel; Moana 2 (Auliʻi Cravalho, Dwayne Johnson and Cast); Twisters: The Album; Wicked: The Soundtrack (Cynthia Erivo, Ariana Grande and Cast) | **Tyla**; Asake; Rema; Tems; Wizkid |
Favorite K-Pop Artist
**RM**; Ateez; Jimin; Rosé; Stray Kids

=== Special awards ===
On May 13, 2025, it was announced Jackson would be honored with the Icon Award. On May 20, Rod Stewart was announced as the recipient of the Lifetime Achievement Award. Zac Brown was announced as the recipient of the inaugural Veterans Voice Award on May 22.

Icon Award
- **Janet Jackson**
Lifetime Achievement Award
- **Rod Stewart**
Veterans Voice Award
- **Zac Brown**
