= American Music Award for Best Rock/Alternative Artist =

American music award

American Music Awards for Best Rock/Alternative Artist
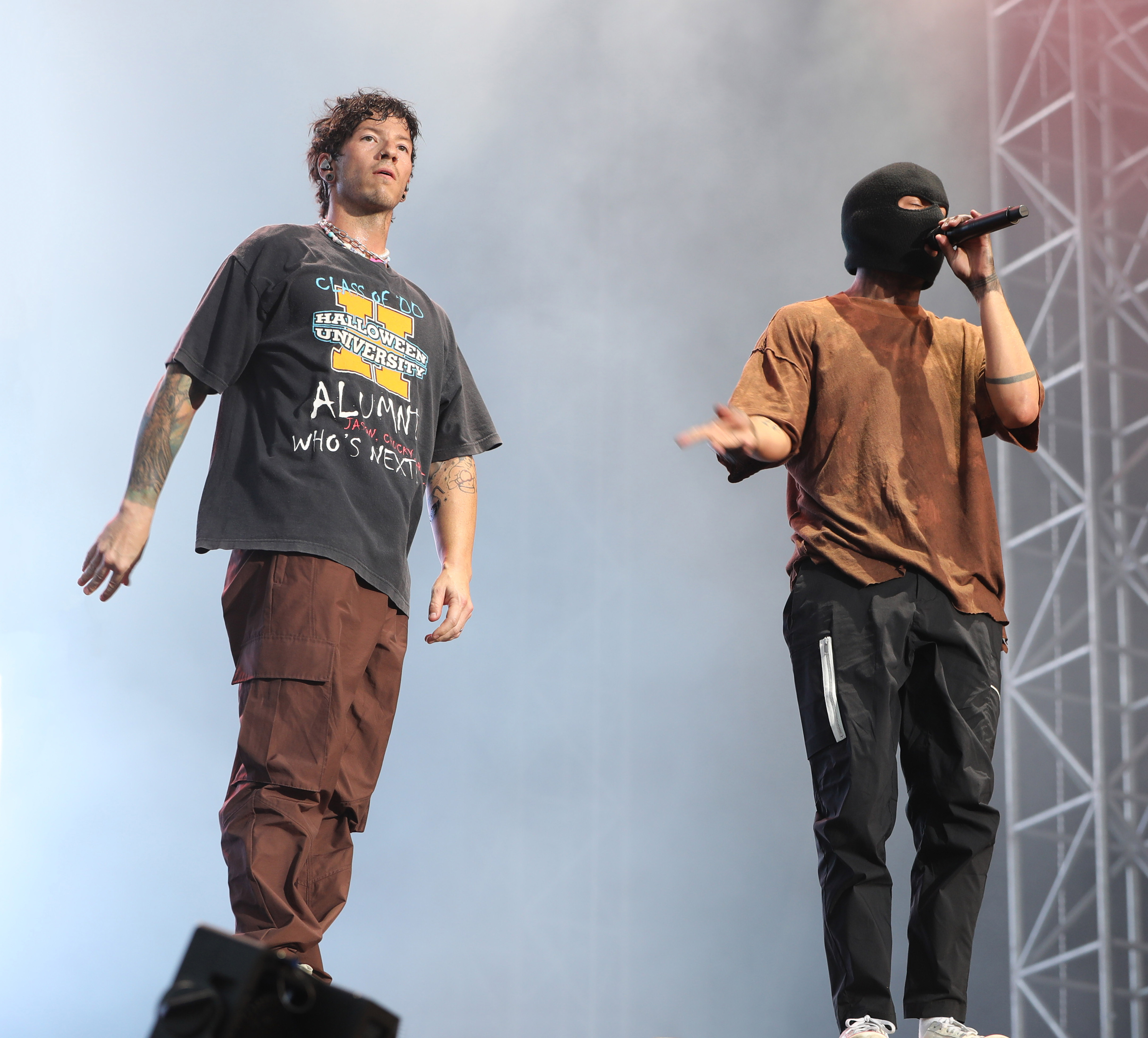
- Twenty One Pilots is the most recent recipient
- Country: United States
- Presented by: American Music Awards
- First award: 1995
- Currently held by: Twenty One Pilots

Highlights
- Most wins: Linkin Park (6)
- Most nominations: Linkin Park (10)
- Website: theamas.com

The American Music Award for Best Rock/Alternative Artist has been awarded since 1995. Years reflect the year in which the awards were presented, for works released in the previous year (until 2003 onward when awards were handed out in November of the same year). The all-time winner in this category is Linkin Park with 6 wins, and are also the most nominated act with 10 nominations. The award was previous known as Favorite Rock Artist from 1995 to 2025.

== Winners and nominees ==
=== 1990s ===
Year	Artist	Ref
1995 (22nd)
1995 (22nd)	Counting Crows	
1995 (22nd)	Green Day	
1995 (22nd)	Nine Inch Nails	
1996 (23rd)
1996 (23rd)	Pearl Jam	
1996 (23rd)	Green Day	
1996 (23rd)	Nine Inch Nails	
1997 (24th)
1997 (24th)	The Smashing Pumpkins	
1997 (24th)	Bush	
1997 (24th)	Stone Temple Pilots	
1998 (25th)
1998 (25th)	Bush	
1998 (25th)	The Mighty Mighty Bosstones	
1998 (25th)	Sublime	
1999 (26th)
1999 (26th)	Pearl Jam	
1999 (26th)	Green Day	
1999 (26th)	Third Eye Blind	

=== 2000s ===
Year	Artist	Ref
2000 (27th)
2000 (27th)	Red Hot Chili Peppers	
2000 (27th)	Kid Rock	
2000 (27th)	Limp Bizkit	
2001 (28th)
2001 (28th)	Creed	
2001 (28th)	Limp Bizkit	
2001 (28th)	Red Hot Chili Peppers	
2002 (29th)
2002 (29th)	Limp Bizkit	
2002 (29th)	Linkin Park	
2002 (29th)	Staind	
2003 (30th)
2003 (30th)	Creed	
2003 (30th)	Linkin Park	
2003 (30th)	System of a Down	
2003 (31st)
2003 (31st)	Linkin Park	
2003 (31st)	Coldplay	
2003 (31st)	Metallica	
2004 (32nd)
2004 (32nd)	Linkin Park	
2004 (32nd)	Incubus	
2004 (32nd)	Jet	
2005 (33rd)
2005 (33rd)	Green Day	
2005 (33rd)	Coldplay	
2005 (33rd)	System of a Down	
2006 (34th)
2006 (34th)	Red Hot Chili Peppers	
2006 (34th)	Nickelback	
2006 (34th)	Pearl Jam	
2007 (35th)
2007 (35th)	Linkin Park	
2007 (35th)	My Chemical Romance	
2007 (35th)	The White Stripes	
2008 (36th)
2008 (36th)	Linkin Park	
2008 (36th)	Coldplay	
2008 (36th)	Foo Fighters	
2009 (37th)
2009 (37th)	Green Day	
2009 (37th)	Kings of Leon	
2009 (37th)	Shinedown	

=== 2010s ===
Year	Artist	Ref
2010 (38th)
2010 (38th)	Muse	
2010 (38th)	Phoenix	
2010 (38th)	Vampire Weekend	
2011 (39th)
2011 (39th)	Foo Fighters	
2011 (39th)	The Black Keys	
2011 (39th)	Mumford & Sons	
2012 (40th)
2012 (40th)	Linkin Park	
2012 (40th)	The Black Keys	
2012 (40th)	Gotye	
2013 (41st)
2013 (41st)	Imagine Dragons	
2013 (41st)	The Lumineers	
2013 (41st)	Mumford & Sons	
2014 (42nd)
2014 (42nd)	Imagine Dragons	
2014 (42nd)	Bastille	
2014 (42nd)	Lorde	
2015 (43rd)
2015 (43rd)	Fall Out Boy	
2015 (43rd)	Hozier	
2015 (43rd)	Walk the Moon	
2016 (44th)
2016 (44th)	Twenty One Pilots	
2016 (44th)	Coldplay	
2016 (44th)	X Ambassadors	
2017 (45th)
2017 (45th)	Linkin Park	
2017 (45th)	Imagine Dragons	
2017 (45th)	Twenty One Pilots	
2018 (46th)
2018 (46th)	Panic! at the Disco	
2018 (46th)	Imagine Dragons	
2018 (46th)	Portugal. The Man	
2019 (47th)
2019 (47th)	Billie Eilish	
2019 (47th)	Panic! at the Disco	
2019 (47th)	Imagine Dragons	

=== 2020s ===
Year	Artist	Ref
2020 (48th)
2020 (48th)	Twenty One Pilots	
2020 (48th)	Billie Eilish	
2020 (48th)	Tame Impala	
2021 (49th)
2021 (49th)	Machine Gun Kelly	
2021 (49th)	AJR	
2021 (49th)	All Time Low	
2021 (49th)	Foo Fighters	
2021 (49th)	Glass Animals	
2022 (50th)
2022 (50th)	Machine Gun Kelly	
2022 (50th)	Imagine Dragons	
2022 (50th)	The Lumineers	
2022 (50th)	Måneskin	
2022 (50th)	Red Hot Chili Peppers	
2023 – 24	—N/a	
2025 (51th)
2025 (51th)	Twenty One Pilots	
2025 (51th)	Hozier	
2025 (51th)	Linkin Park	
2025 (51th)	Pearl Jam	
2025 (51th)	Zach Bryan	
2026 (52nd)
2026 (52nd)	Twenty One Pilots	
2026 (52nd)	Deftones	
2026 (52nd)	Linkin Park	
2026 (52nd)	The Marías	
2026 (52nd)	Sleep Token	

== Category facts ==
=== Multiple wins ===
6 wins

- Linkin Park

4 wins

- Twenty One Pilots

2 wins

- Creed
- Green Day
- Imagine Dragons
- Pearl Jam
- Red Hot Chili Peppers
- Machine Gun Kelly

=== Multiple nominations ===
10 nominations

- Linkin Park

5 nominations

- Green Day
- Imagine Dragons
- Twenty One Pilots

4 nominations

- Coldplay
- Pearl Jam

3 nominations

- Foo Fighters
- Limp Bizkit
- Red Hot Chili Peppers

2 nominations

- Billie Eilish
- The Black Keys
- Bush
- Creed
- Hozier
- Mumford & Sons
- Nine Inch Nails
- Panic! at the Disco
- System of a Down
