= American Music Award for Best Dance/Electronic Artist =

American music award

American Music Awards for Best Dance/Electronic Artist
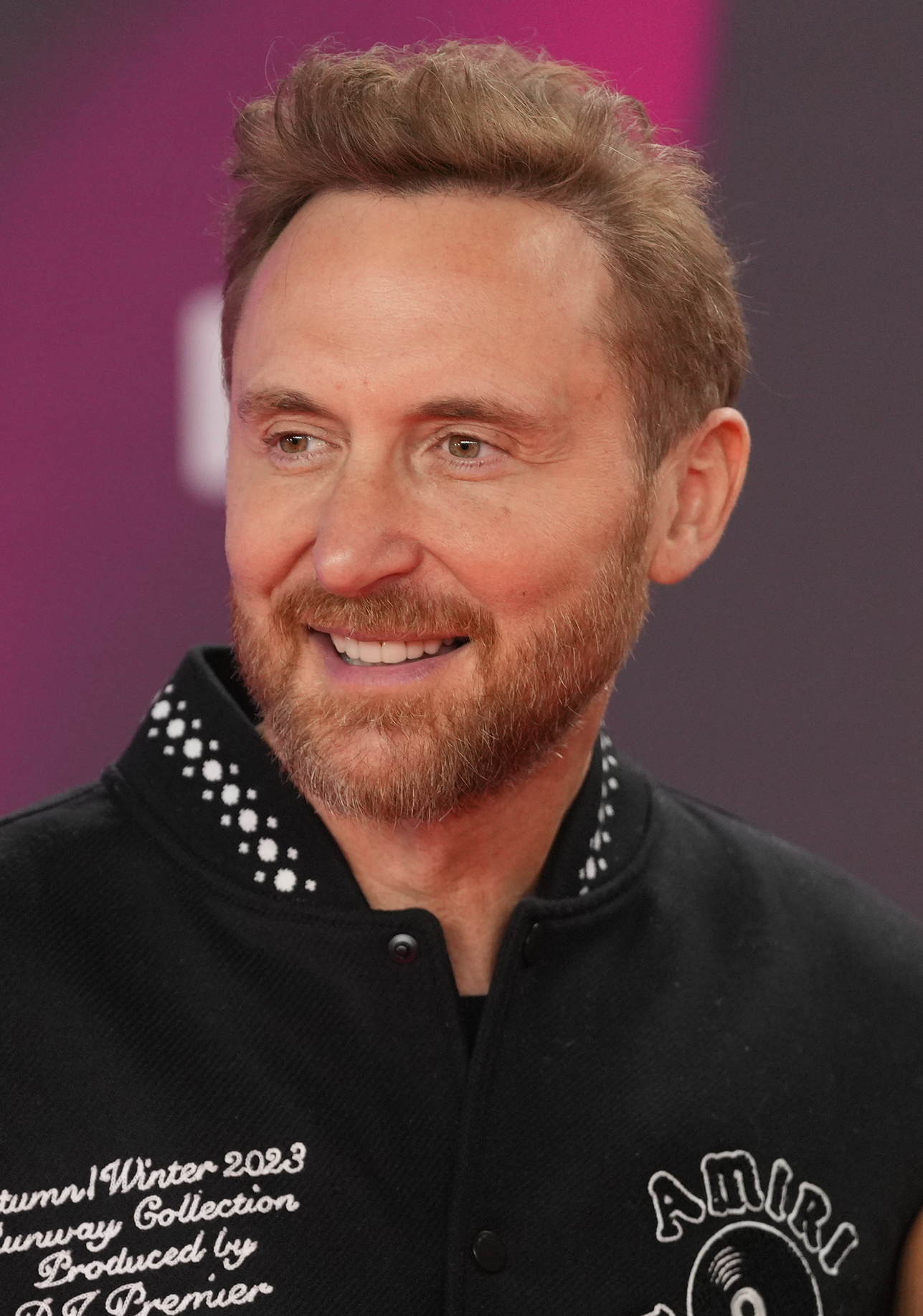
- David Guetta is the most recent recipient
- Country: United States
- Presented by: American Music Awards
- First award: 2012
- Currently held by: David Guetta

Highlights
- Most wins: Marshmello (4)
- Most nominations: Calvin Harris (7)
- Website: theamas.com

The American Music Award for Best Dance/Electronic Artist has been awarded since 2012. Years reflect the year during which the awards were presented, for works released in the previous year (until 2003 onward, when awards were handed out on November of the same year). The all-time winner in this category is Marshmello, Calvin Harris with 3 wins. Harris is the most nominated artist with 7 nominations. In 2020, Lady Gaga became the first woman to be nominated and to win this category. The award was previous known as Favorite Electronic Dance Music Artist from 2012 to 2025.

== Winners and nominees ==
=== 2010s ===
Year	Artist	Ref
2012 (40th)
2012 (40th)	David Guetta	
2012 (40th)	Calvin Harris	
2012 (40th)	Skrillex	
2013 (41st)
2013 (41st)	Avicii	
2013 (41st)	Daft Punk	
2013 (41st)	Calvin Harris	
2013 (41st)	Zedd	
2014 (42nd)
2014 (42nd)	Calvin Harris	
2014 (42nd)	Avicii	
2014 (42nd)	Zedd	
2015 (43rd)
2015 (43rd)	Calvin Harris	
2015 (43rd)	David Guetta	
2015 (43rd)	Zedd	
2016 (44th)
2016 (44th)	The Chainsmokers	
2016 (44th)	Calvin Harris	
2016 (44th)	Major Lazer	
2017 (45th)
2017 (45th)	The Chainsmokers	
2017 (45th)	DJ Snake	
2017 (45th)	Calvin Harris	
2018 (46th)
2018 (46th)	Marshmello	
2018 (46th)	The Chainsmokers	
2018 (46th)	Zedd	
2019 (47th)
2019 (47th)	Marshmello	
2019 (47th)	Avicii	
2019 (47th)	The Chainsmokers	

=== 2020s ===
Year	Artist	Ref
2020 (48th)
2020 (48th)	Lady Gaga	
2020 (48th)	Kygo	
2020 (48th)	Marshmello	
2021 (49th)
2021 (49th)	Marshmello	
2021 (49th)	David Guetta	
2021 (49th)	Illenium	
2021 (49th)	Regard	
2021 (49th)	Tiësto	
2022 (50th)
2022 (50th)	Marshmello	
2022 (50th)	The Chainsmokers	
2022 (50th)	Diplo	
2022 (50th)	Swedish House Mafia	
2022 (50th)	Tiësto	
2023 – 24	—N/a	
2025 (51st)
2025 (51st)	Lady Gaga	
2025 (51st)	Charli XCX	
2025 (51st)	David Guetta	
2025 (51st)	Marshmello	
2025 (51st)	John Summit	
2026 (52nd)
2026 (52nd)	David Guetta	
2026 (52nd)	Calvin Harris	
2026 (52nd)	Fred Again	
2026 (52nd)	Illenium	
2026 (52nd)	John Summit	

== Category facts ==
=== Multiple wins ===
4 wins

- Marshmello

2 wins

- The Chainsmokers
- Calvin Harris
- Lady Gaga
- David Guetta

=== Multiple nominations ===
7 nominations

- Calvin Harris

5 nominations

- David Guetta
- Marshmello

4 nominations

- The Chainsmokers
- Zedd

3 nominations

- Avicii

2 nominations

- Illenium
- Lady Gaga
- John Summit

== See also ==
- American Music Award for Favorite Disco Male Artist (1979)
- American Music Award for Favorite Disco Female Artist (1979)
- American Music Award for Favorite Disco Band/Duo/Group (1979)
- American Music Award for Favorite Disco Album (1979)
- American Music Award for Favorite Disco Song (1979)
- American Music Award for Favorite Dance Artist (1990-1992)
- American Music Award for Favorite Dance Album (1990-1992)
- American Music Award for Favorite Dance New Artist (1990-1992)
