= American Music Awards of 2014 =

Music awards ceremony

42nd Annual American Music Awards
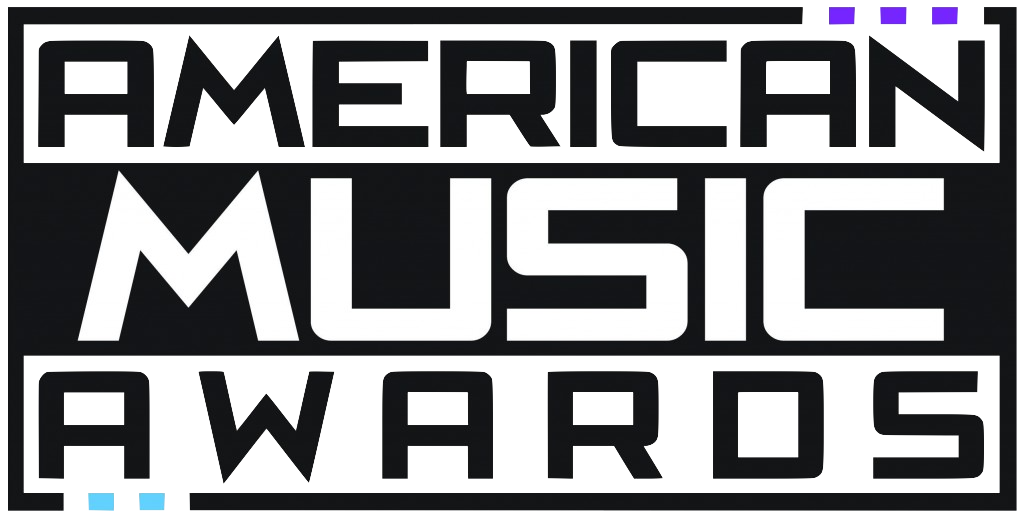
- American Music Awards logo
- Date: November 23, 2014
- Location: Nokia Theatre L.A. Live; Los Angeles, California
- Country: United States
- Hosted by: Pitbull

Highlights
- Most awards: Katy Perry (3 wins)
- Most nominations: Iggy Azalea (6)
- Website: ABC-American Music Awards

Television/radio coverage
- Network: ABC; Metro TV
- Runtime: 180 minutes
- Viewership: 11.61 million
- Produced by: Dick Clark Productions

The 42nd Annual American Music Awards ceremony was held on November 23, 2014, at the Nokia Theatre L.A. Live in Los Angeles, California. The awards recognized the most popular artists and albums of 2014. Iggy Azalea led the nominees with six categories. It was broadcast live on ABC. Pitbull was announced as a host on October 20, 2014. NSYNC's Lance Bass, Chelsea Briggs, Kandi Burruss, Gavin DeGraw, Frankie Grande, Taryn Manning, Jordin Sparks, Morgan Stewart and Ted Stryker were all announced co-hosts of the pre-show on November 7, 2014.

The special received 11.61 million viewers, the fourth-most that night.

== Performances ==
Artist(s)	Song(s)
Pre-show
Becky G	"Can't Stop Dancin'"
Ella Henderson	"Ghost"
Katy Tiz	"The Big Bang"
Mary Lambert	"Secrets"
R5	"Smile"
Main Show
Taylor Swift	"Blank Space"
Charli XCX	"Boom Clap" "Break the Rules"
Wyclef Jean; Magic!	"Rude"
5 Seconds of Summer	"What I Like About You"
Imagine Dragons	"I Bet My Life"
Sam Smith; ASAP Rocky	"I'm Not the Only One"
Iggy Azalea; Charli XCX	"Fancy" "Beg for It"
Lorde	"Yellow Flicker Beat"
Ariana Grande; The Weeknd	"Problem" "Break Free" "Love Me Harder"
Pitbull; Ne-Yo	"Don't Stop the Party" "Fireball" "Time of Our Lives"
Selena Gomez	"The Heart Wants What It Wants"
One Direction	"Night Changes"
Lil Wayne; Christina Milian	"Start a Fire"
Nicki Minaj; Skylar Grey	"Bed of Lies"
Fergie; YG; DJ Mustard	"L.A. Love (La La)"
Chopstick Brothers	"Little Apple"
Garth Brooks	"People Loving People"^{[a]}
Mary J. Blige	"Therapy"
Jessie J Ariana Grande; Nicki Minaj	"Bang Bang"
Jennifer Lopez; Iggy Azalea	"Booty"

Notes

- ^{^[a]} Broadcast live from Garth Brooks' concert in Greensboro, NC.

== Presenters ==
- Patrick Dempsey — presented Favorite Pop/Rock Band/Duo/Group
- Ansel Elgort — introduced Charli XCX
- Rita Ora & Matthew Morrison — introduced Wyclef Jean & Magic!
- Jamie Foxx & Annalise Estelle Foxx (his daughter) — presented Favorite Rap/Hip-Hop Album
- Becky G & Gavin DeGraw — introduced 5 Seconds of Summer
- Lauren Cohan & Danai Gurira — introduced Imagine Dragons
- Uzo Aduba & Taylor Schilling — presented Favorite Pop/Rock Male Artist
- Dianna Agron & Nathan Fillion — introduced Sam Smith & ASAP Rocky
- T.I. — introduced Iggy Azalea & Charli XCX
- Jhené Aiko & Meghan Trainor — presented Favorite Country Male Artist
- Elizabeth Banks — introduced Lorde
- Donnie Wahlberg & Jenny McCarthy — presented Favorite Pop/Rock Album
- Kira Kazantsev — introduced Pitbull & Ne-Yo
- Kendall Jenner, Kylie Jenner & Khloe Kardashian — presented Favorite Pop/Rock Female Artist
- Danica McKellar & Brantley Gilbert — presented Favorite Alternative Artist
- Lucy Hale & Mary Lambert — introduced Selena Gomez
- Julianne Hough — presented New Artist of the Year
- Olivia Munn & Pat Monahan — presented Favorite Rap/Hip-Hop Artist
- Kate Beckinsale — introduced One Direction
- Tracee Ellis Ross & Anthony Anderson — introduced Lil Wayne & Christina Milian as well as Nicki Minaj & Skylar Grey
- Diana Ross — presented the Dick Clark Award for Excellence to Taylor Swift
- Josh Duhamel — introduced Fergie, YG & DJ Mustard
- Luke Bryan — introduced Garth Brooks
- Aloe Blacc & Ella Henderson — introduced Mary J Blige
- Mark Cuban, Daymond John, Robert Herjavec, Kevin O'Leary — presented Favorite Country Album
- Pentatonix — introduced Jessie J, Ariana Grande & Nicki Minaj
- Heidi Klum — presented Artist of the Year

== Winners and nominees ==
The nominations were announced on October 13, 2014, by Jason Derulo and Charli XCX.

Artist of the Year	New Artist of the Year
One Direction; Iggy Azalea; Beyoncé; Luke Bryan; Katy Perry	5 Seconds of Summer; Iggy Azalea; Bastille; Sam Smith; Meghan Trainor
Favorite Pop/Rock Male Artist	Favorite Pop/Rock Female Artist
Sam Smith; John Legend; Pharrell Williams	Katy Perry; Iggy Azalea; Lorde
Favorite Pop/Rock Band/Duo/Group	Favorite Pop/Rock Album
One Direction; Imagine Dragons; OneRepublic	Midnight Memories – One Direction; Pure Heroine – Lorde; Prism – Katy Perry
Favorite Country Male Artist	Favorite Country Female Artist
Luke Bryan; Jason Aldean; Blake Shelton	Carrie Underwood; Miranda Lambert; Kacey Musgraves
Favorite Country Duo or Group	Favorite Country Album
Florida Georgia Line; Eli Young Band; Lady Antebellum	Just as I Am – Brantley Gilbert; Blame It All on My Roots: Five Decades of Influences – Garth Brooks; The Outsiders – Eric Church
Favorite Rap/Hip-Hop Artist	Favorite Rap/Hip-Hop Album
Iggy Azalea; Drake; Eminem	The New Classic – Iggy Azalea; Nothing Was the Same – Drake; The Marshall Mathers LP 2 – Eminem
Favorite Soul/R&B Male Artist	Favorite Soul/R&B Female Artist
John Legend; Chris Brown; Pharrell Williams	Beyoncé; Jhené Aiko; Mary J. Blige
Favorite Soul/R&B Album	Favorite Alternative Artist
Beyoncé – Beyoncé; G I R L – Pharrell Williams; Love in the Future – John Legend	Imagine Dragons; Bastille; Lorde
Favorite Adult Contemporary Artist	Favorite Latin Artist
Katy Perry; Sara Bareilles; OneRepublic	Enrique Iglesias; Marc Anthony; Romeo Santos
Favorite Contemporary Inspirational Artist	Favorite EDM Artist
Casting Crowns; Hillsong United; Newsboys	Calvin Harris; Avicii; Zedd
Single of the Year	Top Soundtrack
"Dark Horse" – Katy Perry featuring Juicy J; "Happy" – Pharrell Williams; "All of Me" – John Legend; "Rude" – Magic!; "Fancy" – Iggy Azalea featuring Charli XCX	Frozen; The Fault in Our Stars; Guardians of the Galaxy: Awesome Mix, Vol. 1
International Song Award	International Artist Award
"Little Apple" – Chopstick Brothers	Jason Zhang
Dick Clark Award for Excellence
Taylor Swift
