= American Music Awards of 2013 =

2013 music award ceremony

41st Annual American Music Awards
- Date: November 24, 2013
- Location: Nokia Theatre L.A. Live, Los Angeles, California
- Country: United States
- Hosted by: Pitbull

Highlights
- Most wins: Taylor Swift (4)
- Most nominations: Macklemore & Ryan Lewis (6)
- Website: ABC-American Music Awards

Television/radio coverage
- Network: ABC
- Runtime: 180 minutes
- Viewership: 12.93 million
- Produced by: Dick Clark Productions

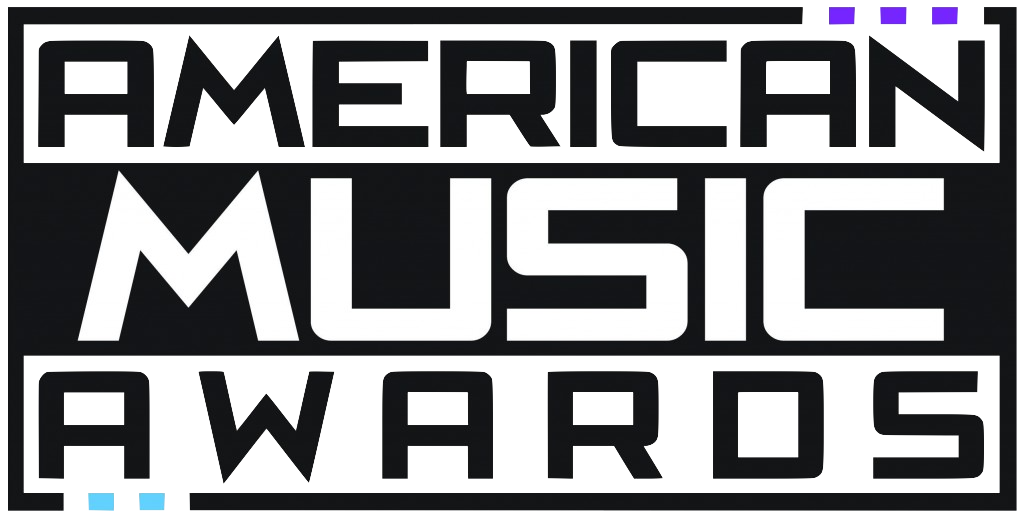
Official logo

The 41st Annual American Music Awards was held on November 24, 2013, at the Nokia Theatre L.A. Live in Los Angeles. The awards recognized the most popular artists and albums of 2013. It was broadcast live on ABC and CTV with Simultaneous substitution. The nominations were announced on October 10, 2013, by Kelly Clarkson and will.i.am. Macklemore & Ryan Lewis led the nominations with six, followed by Taylor Swift and Justin Timberlake with five. The show was hosted by Pitbull.

Taylor Swift was the biggest winner of the night with four wins including Artist of the Year, Favorite Pop/Rock Female Artist, Favorite Country Female Artist and Favorite Country Album. Justin Timberlake also won three awards for Favorite Pop/Rock Male Artist, Favorite Soul/R&B Male Artist and Favorite Soul/R&B Album.

Rihanna won the first-ever Icon Award, as well as winning Favorite Soul/R&B Female Artist.

== Performances ==
Performer(s)	Song(s)
Pre-show
Fifth Harmony	"Better Together"
Jesse McCartney	"Back Together"
Main show
Katy Perry	"Unconditionally"
One Direction	"Story of My Life"
Ariana Grande	"The Way" "Tattooed Heart"
Imagine Dragons	"Demons" "Radioactive"
Pitbull; Kesha	"Timber"
Justin Timberlake	"Drink You Away"
Florida Georgia Line; Nelly	"Cruise" "Ride wit Me"
Rihanna	"Diamonds"
Macklemore & Ryan Lewis; Ray Dalton	"Can't Hold Us"
Jennifer Lopez	Tribute to Celia Cruz: "Químbara" "Bemba Colorá" "La Vida Es Un Carnaval"
A Great Big World; Christina Aguilera	"Say Something"
Kendrick Lamar	"Swimming Pools (Drank)" "Poetic Justice"
Lady Gaga; R. Kelly	"Do What U Want"
Luke Bryan	"That's My Kind of Night"
TLC; Lil Mama	"Waterfalls"
Miley Cyrus	"Wrecking Ball"

== Presenters ==
- Taylor Swift — presented Favorite Pop/Rock Male Artist
- Emma Roberts — introduced One Direction
- Marc Anthony & Zoe Saldaña — presented Favorite Soul/R&B Female Artist
- Kristen Bell & Chris Daughtry — presented Favorite Country Album
- Akon & Michael Bolton — presented Favorite Rap/Hip-Hop Album
- Maia Mitchell & Naya Rivera — introduced Pitbull & Kesha
- Dave Grohl & Joan Jett — presented Favorite Alternative Artist
- Pitbull (host) — presented Favorite Latin Artist
- Heidi Klum — introduced Justin Timberlake
- Kelly Osbourne & Nicole Richie — presented Favorite Pop/Rock Album
- The Ceremonies — introduced Florida Georgia Line & Nelly
- Daisy Fuentes & Juan Pablo Galavis — presented Kohl's New Artist of the Year
- Bill Maher — introduced Rihanna
- Monica Fenty — presented the Icon Award to her daughter Rihanna
- Ciara & Paulina Gretzky — presented Favorite Soul/R&B Male Artist
- Fall Out Boy — presented Favorite Country Female Artist
- Alicia Silverstone & Nathan Fillion — presented Single of the Year
- Sarah Silverman — presented Favorite Soul/R&B Album
- Jennifer Hudson — introduced A Great Big World & Christina Aguilera
- Austin Mahone & Kendall Jenner — presented Favorite Electronic Dance Music Artist
- Jeremy Renner — introduced Lady Gaga & R. Kelly
- Jaimie Alexander & Andrew McCutchen — presented Favorite Country Male Artist
- Cast of Shark Tank — presented Favorite Pop/Rock Band/Duo/Group
- Lady Antebellum — introduced Luke Bryan
- Pitbull (host) — presented Artist of the Year
- 2 Chainz & Jaden Smith — introduced Miley Cyrus

== Winners and nominees ==
Artist of the Year	Kohl's New Artist of the Year
Taylor Swift; Macklemore & Ryan Lewis; Bruno Mars; Rihanna; Justin Timberlake	Ariana Grande; Florida Georgia Line; Imagine Dragons; Macklemore & Ryan Lewis; Phillip Phillips
Favorite Pop/Rock Male Artist	Favorite Pop/Rock Female Artist
Justin Timberlake; Bruno Mars; Robin Thicke	Taylor Swift; P!nk; Rihanna
Favorite Pop/Rock Band/Duo/Group	Favorite Pop/Rock Album
One Direction; Imagine Dragons; Macklemore & Ryan Lewis	Take Me Home – One Direction; Red – Taylor Swift; The 20/20 Experience – Justin Timberlake
Favorite Country Male Artist	Favorite Country Female Artist
Luke Bryan; Hunter Hayes; Blake Shelton	Taylor Swift; Miranda Lambert; Carrie Underwood
Favorite Country Band/Duo/Group	Favorite Country Album
Lady Antebellum; The Band Perry; Florida Georgia Line	Red – Taylor Swift; Crash My Party – Luke Bryan; Here's to the Good Times – Florida Georgia Line
Favorite Rap/Hip-Hop Artist	Favorite Rap/Hip-Hop Album
Macklemore & Ryan Lewis; Jay-Z; Lil Wayne	The Heist – Macklemore & Ryan Lewis; Magna Carta... Holy Grail – Jay-Z; Good Kid, M.A.A.D City – Kendrick Lamar
Favorite Soul/R&B Male Artist	Favorite Soul/R&B Female Artist
Justin Timberlake; Miguel; Robin Thicke	Rihanna; Ciara; Alicia Keys
Favorite Soul/R&B Album	Favorite Alternative Artist
The 20/20 Experience – Justin Timberlake; Unapologetic – Rihanna; Blurred Lines – Robin Thicke	Imagine Dragons; The Lumineers; Mumford & Sons
Favorite Adult Contemporary Artist	Favorite Latin Artist
Maroon 5; Bruno Mars; P!nk	Marc Anthony; Prince Royce; Romeo Santos
Favorite Contemporary Inspirational Artist	Favorite Electronic Dance Music Artist
Matthew West; tobyMac; Chris Tomlin	Avicii; Daft Punk; Calvin Harris; Zedd
Single of the Year	Favorite Soundtrack
"Cruise" – Florida Georgia Line featuring Nelly; "Thrift Shop" – Macklemore & Ryan Lewis featuring Wanz; "Blurred Lines" – Robin Thicke featuring Pharrell Williams and T.I.	Pitch Perfect: Original Motion Picture Soundtrack; The Great Gatsby: Music from Baz Luhrmann's Film; Les Misérables: Highlights from the Motion Picture Soundtrack
Icon Award
Rihanna
