= American Music Award for Favorite Latin Artist =

American music award

American Music Awards for Favorite Latin Artist
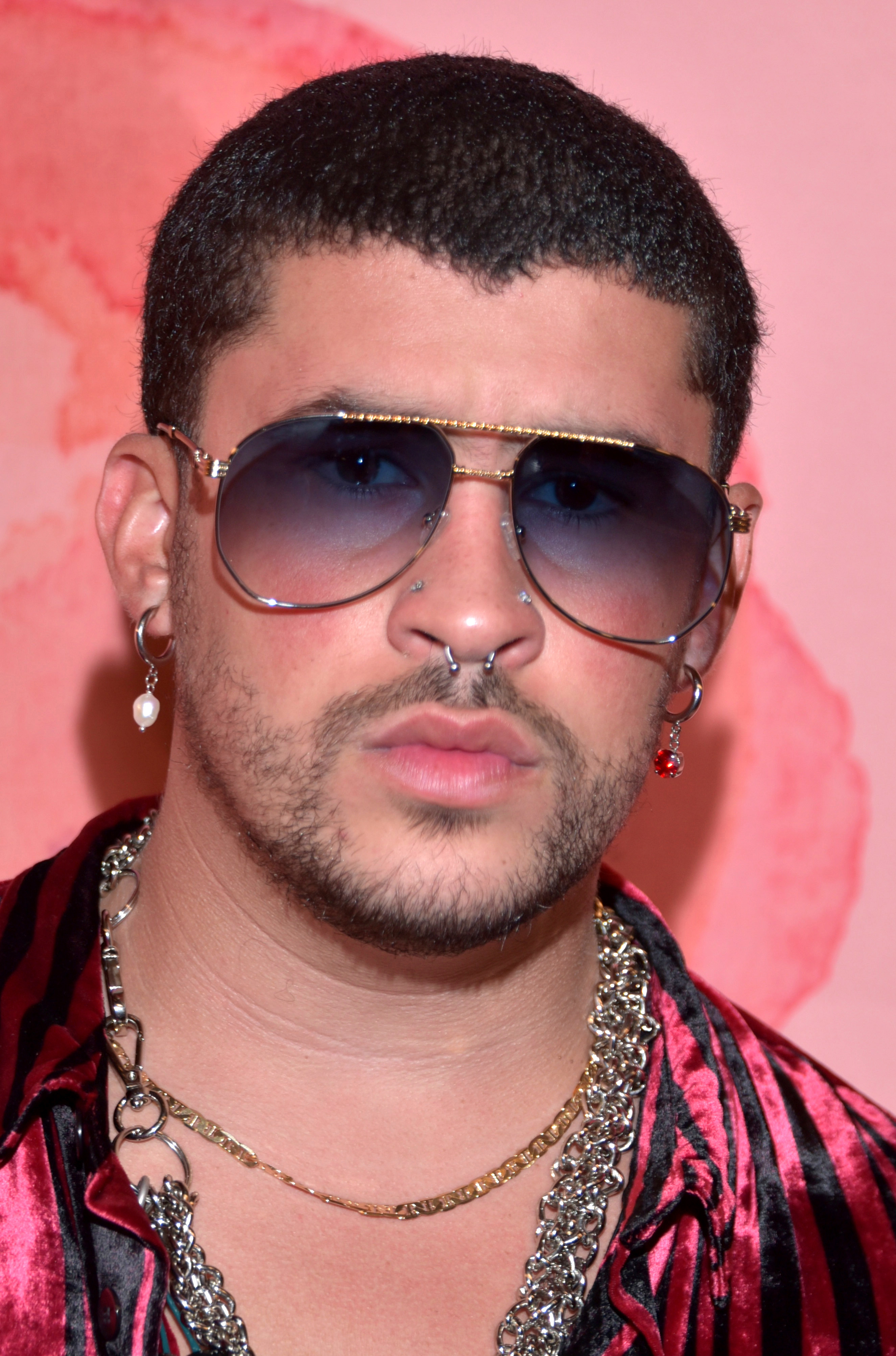
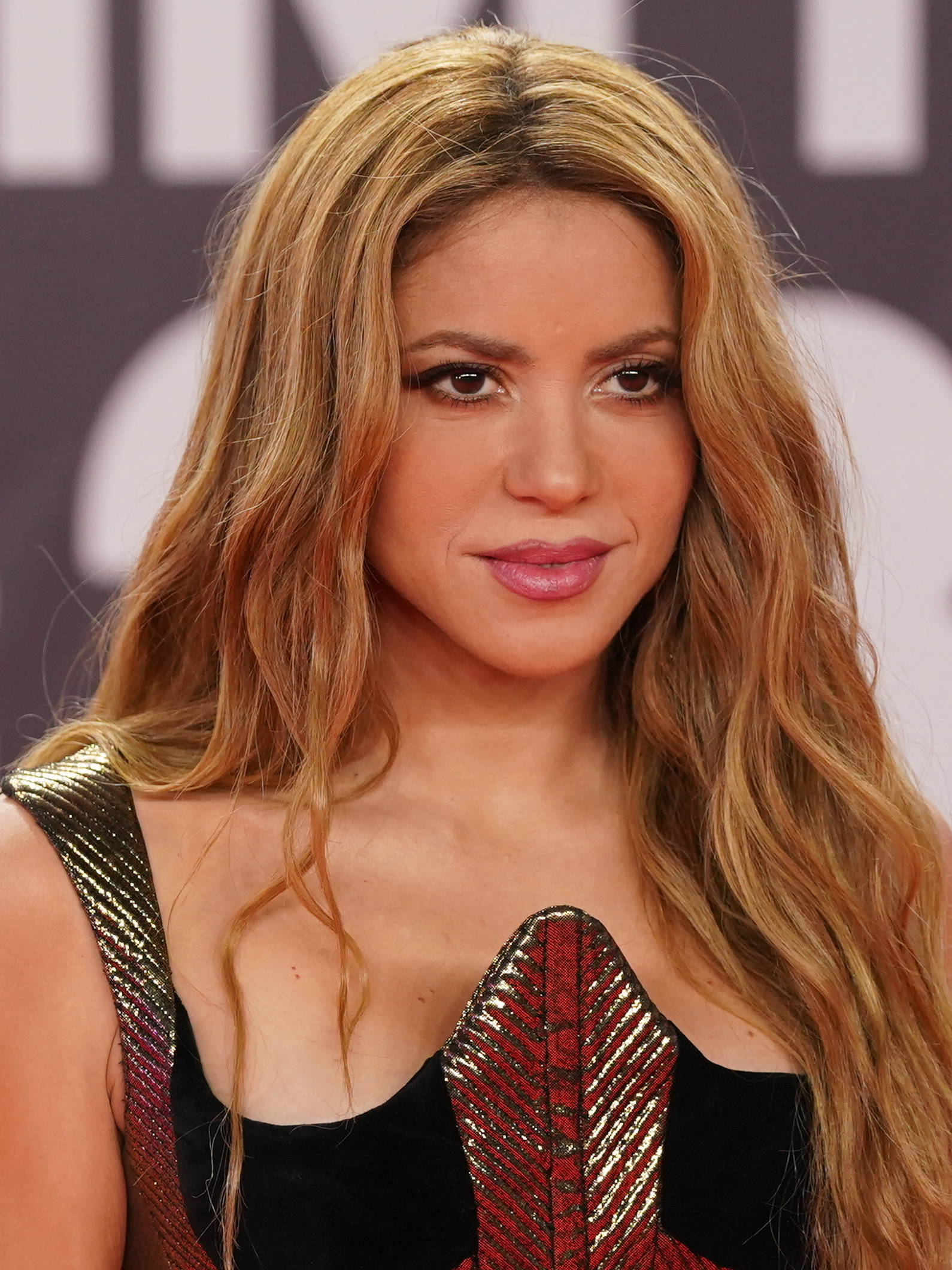
- Bad Bunny and Shakira is the most recent recipient
- Country: United States
- Presented by: American Music Awards
- First award: 1998
- Currently held by: Bad Bunny; Shakira

Highlights
- Most wins: Enrique Iglesias (8)
- Most nominations: Enrique Iglesias (12)
- Website: theamas.com

The American Music Award for Favorite Artist – Latin has been awarded since 1998. On the list below, the year reflects the year in which the awards were presented for works released in the previous year (until 2003 onward when awards were handed out on November of the same year). The all-time winner in this category is Enrique Iglesias with 8 wins. He is also the most nominated artist with 12 nominations. For the 48th American Music Awards in 2020, the category was split into Favorite Male Artist – Latin and Favorite Female Artist – Latin in recognition of the increasing popularity of the Latin genre in the US.

== Winners and nominees ==
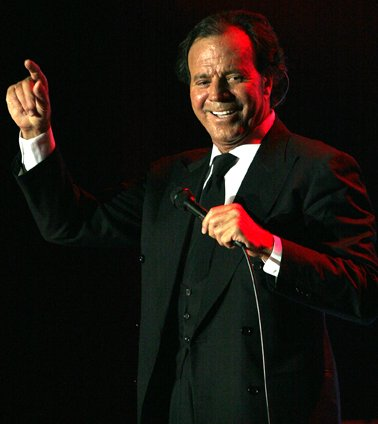
Inaugural award recipient Julio Iglesias.

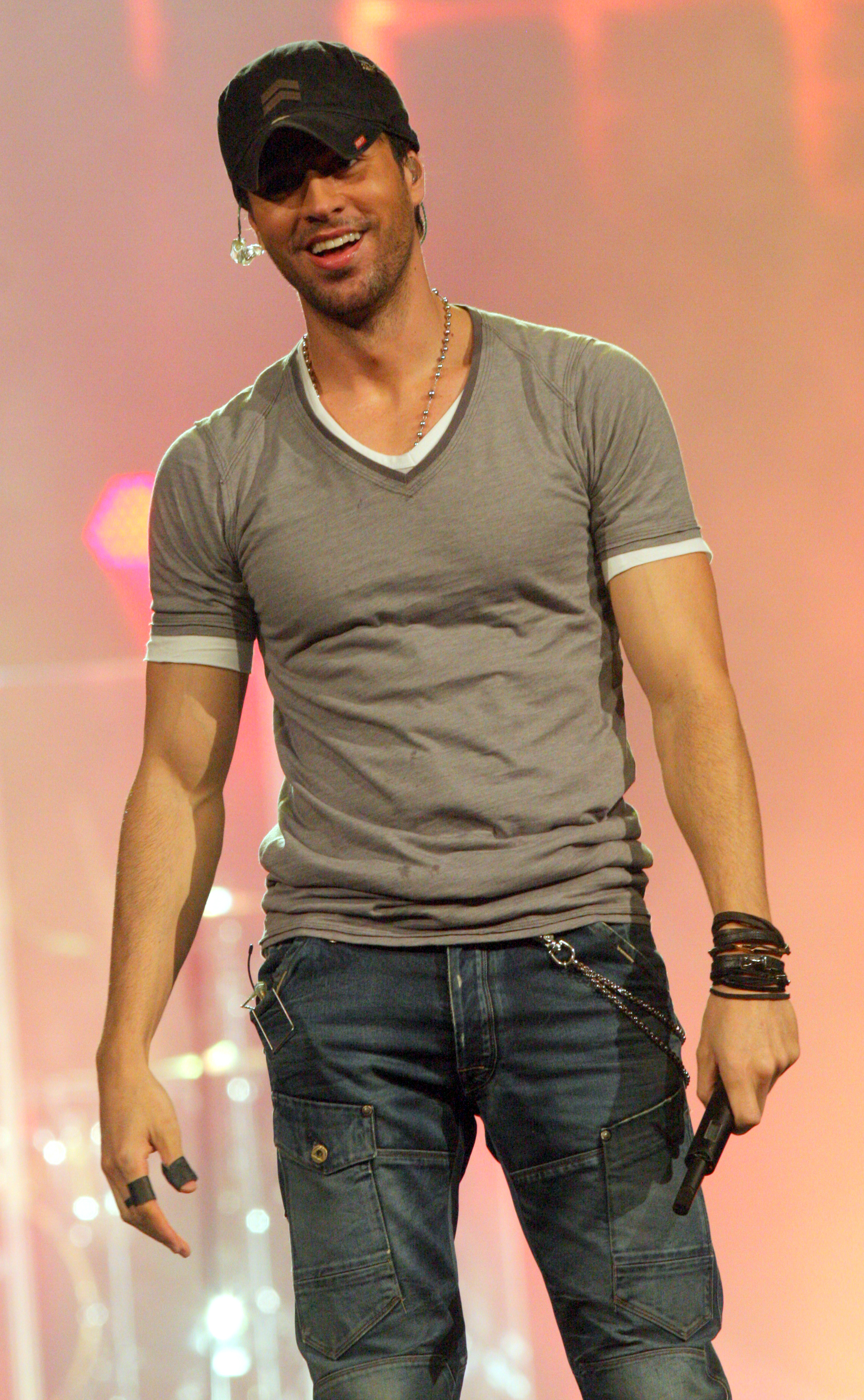
Enrique Iglesias leads the category with eight wins.

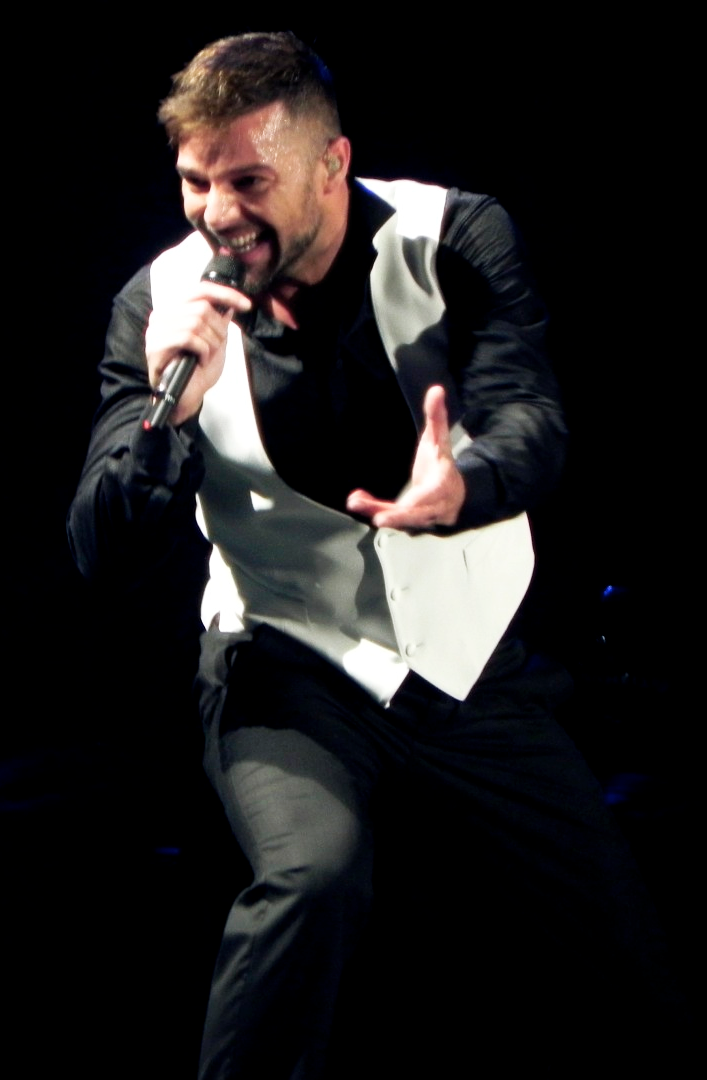
Two-time winner Ricky Martin.

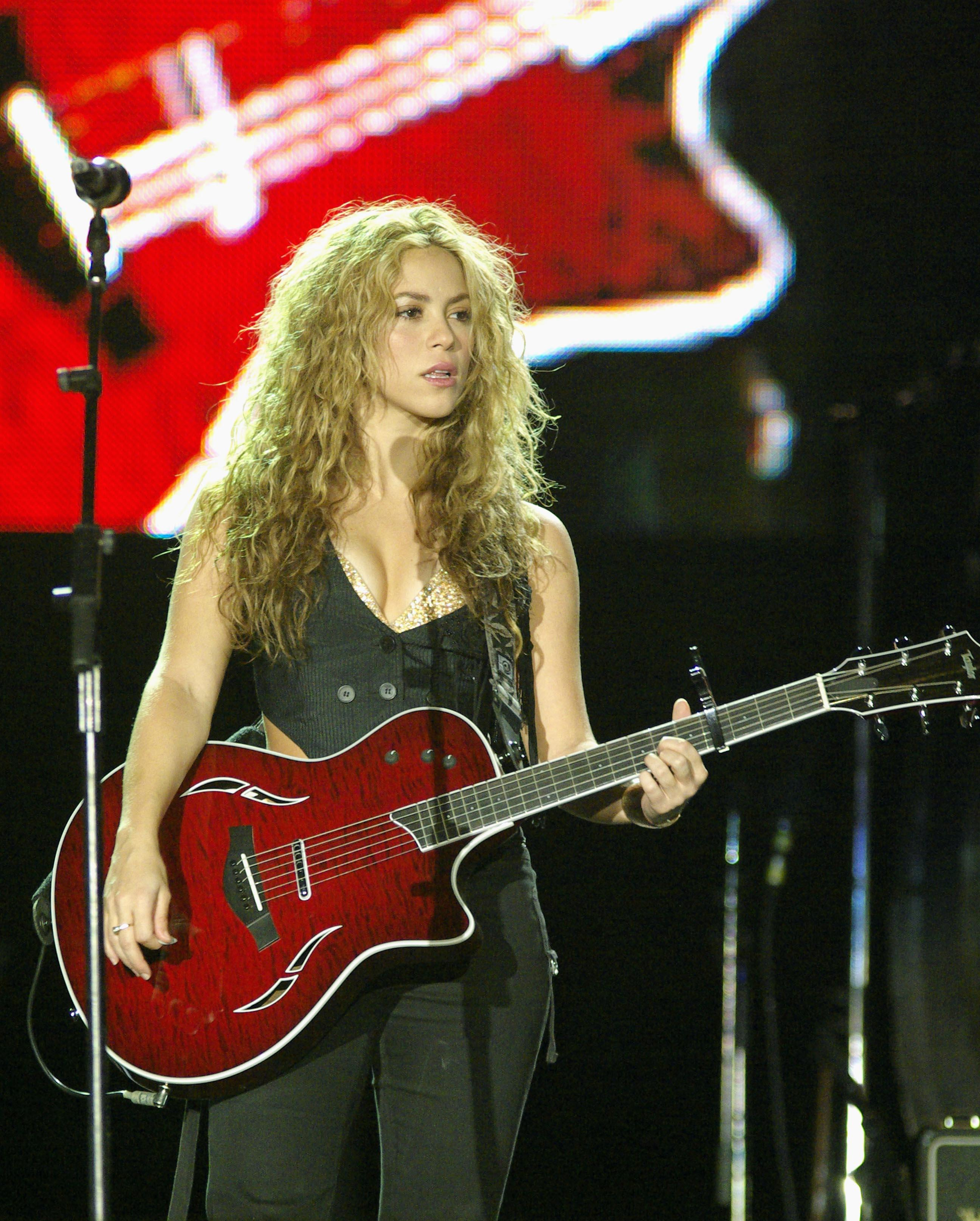
Shakira is the most awarded female artist, with five wins.

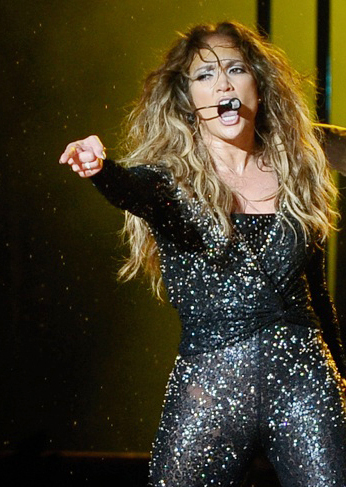
Two-time winner Jennifer Lopez.

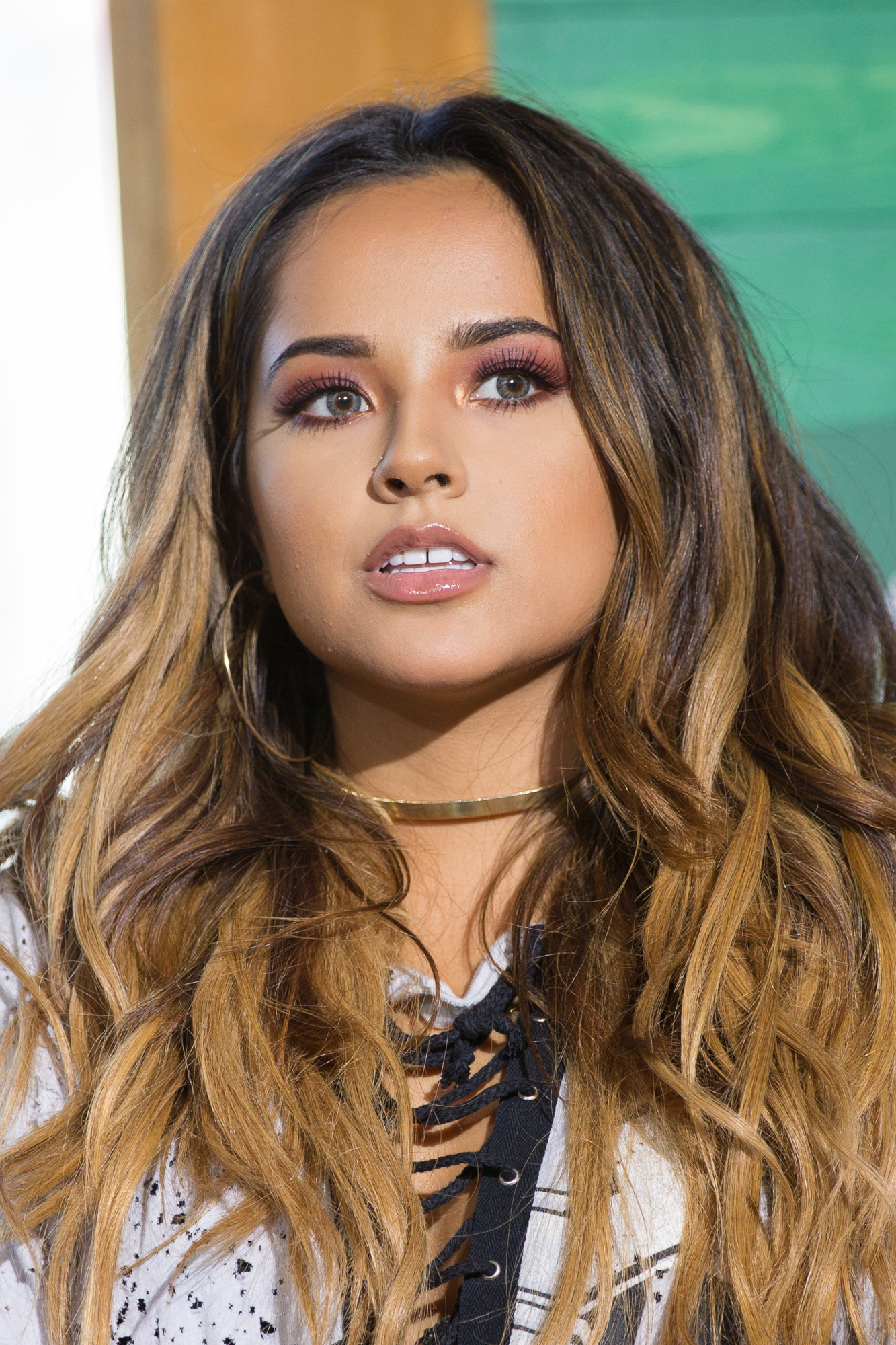
Becky G was the first female to win the award after it was split in 2020.

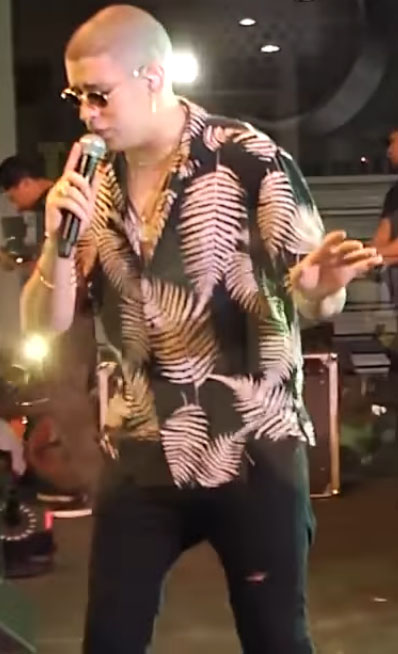
Bad Bunny was the first male winner after the award was divided.

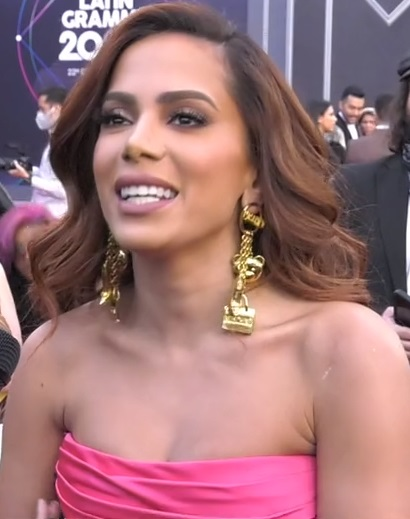
Anitta was the first Brazilian singer to win the award.

=== 1990s ===
Year	Winner and Nominees	Ref
1998 (25th)
1998 (25th)	Julio Iglesias	
1998 (25th)	Enrique Iglesias	
1998 (25th)	Luis Miguel	
1999 (26th)
1999 (26th)	Enrique Iglesias	
1999 (26th)	Los Tigres del Norte	
1999 (26th)	Ricky Martin	

=== 2000s ===
Year	Winner and Nominees	Ref
2000 (27th)
2000 (27th)	Ricky Martin	
2000 (27th)	Enrique Iglesias	
2000 (27th)	Jennifer Lopez	
2001 (28th)
2001 (28th)	Enrique Iglesias	
2001 (28th)	Marc Anthony	
2001 (28th)	Shakira	
2002 (29th)
2002 (29th)	Enrique Iglesias	
2002 (29th)	Shakira	
2002 (29th)	Jaci Velasquez	
2003 (30th)
2003 (30th)	Enrique Iglesias	
2003 (30th)	Marc Anthony	
2003 (30th)	Shakira	
2003 (31st)
2003 (31st)	Ricky Martin	
2003 (31st)	Kumbia Kings	
2003 (31st)	Luis Miguel	
2004 (32nd)
2004 (32nd)	Marc Anthony	
2004 (32nd)	Intocable	
2004 (32nd)	Paulina Rubio	
2005 (33rd)
2005 (33rd)	Shakira	
2005 (33rd)	Daddy Yankee	
2005 (33rd)	Luis Miguel	
2006 (34th)
2006 (34th)	Shakira	
2006 (34th)	Daddy Yankee	
2006 (34th)	Don Omar	
2007 (35th)
2007 (35th)	Jennifer Lopez	
2007 (35th)	Daddy Yankee	
2007 (35th)	Juan Luis Guerra	
2008 (36th)
2008 (36th)	Enrique Iglesias	
2008 (36th)	Juanes	
2008 (36th)	Wisin & Yandel	
2009 (37th)
2009 (37th)	Aventura	
2009 (37th)	Luis Fonsi	
2009 (37th)	Wisin & Yandel	

=== 2010s ===
Year	Winner and Nominees	Ref
2010 (38th)
2010 (38th)	Shakira	
2010 (38th)	Daddy Yankee	
2010 (38th)	Enrique Iglesias	
2011 (39th)
2011 (39th)	Jennifer Lopez	
2011 (39th)	Enrique Iglesias	
2011 (39th)	Pitbull	
2012 (40th)
2012 (40th)	Shakira	
2012 (40th)	Don Omar	
2012 (40th)	Pitbull	
2013 (41st)
2013 (41st)	Marc Anthony	
2013 (41st)	Prince Royce	
2013 (41st)	Romeo Santos	
2014 (42nd)
2014 (42nd)	Enrique Iglesias	
2014 (42nd)	Marc Anthony	
2014 (42nd)	Romeo Santos	
2015 (43rd)
2015 (43rd)	Enrique Iglesias	
2015 (43rd)	Ricky Martin	
2015 (43rd)	Romeo Santos	
2016 (44th)
2016 (44th)	Enrique Iglesias	
2016 (44th)	J Balvin	
2016 (44th)	Nicky Jam	
2017 (45th)
2017 (45th)	Shakira	
2017 (45th)	Daddy Yankee	
2017 (45th)	Luis Fonsi	
2018 (46th)
2018 (46th)	Daddy Yankee	
2018 (46th)	J Balvin	
2018 (46th)	Ozuna	
2019 (47th)
2019 (47th)	J Balvin	
2019 (47th)	Bad Bunny	
2019 (47th)	Ozuna	

=== 2020s ===
Year	Winner and Nominees		Ref.
2020 (48th)	Becky G	Bad Bunny	
2020 (48th)	Karol G	J Balvin	
2020 (48th)	Rosalía	Ozuna	
2021 (49th)	Becky G	Bad Bunny	
2021 (49th)	Kali Uchis	J Balvin	
2021 (49th)	Karol G	Maluma	
2021 (49th)	Natti Natasha	Rauw Alejandro	
2021 (49th)	Rosalía	Ozuna	
2022 (50th)	Anitta	Bad Bunny	
2022 (50th)	Becky G	Farruko	
2022 (50th)	Kali Uchis	J Balvin	
2022 (50th)	Karol G	Jhayco	
2022 (50th)	Rosalía	Rauw Alejandro	
2023 – 24	—N/a		
2025 (51st)	Becky G	Bad Bunny	
2025 (51st)	Karol G	Feid	
2025 (51st)	Natti Natasha	Peso Pluma	
2025 (51st)	Shakira	Rauw Alejandro	
2025 (51st)	Young Miko	Tito Double P	
2026 (52nd)	Shakira	Bad Bunny	
2026 (52nd)	Gloria Estefan	Tito Double P	
2026 (52nd)	Karol G	Junior H	
2026 (52nd)	Natti Natasha	Peso Pluma	
2026 (52nd)	Rosalía	Rauw Alejandro	

== Category facts ==
=== Multiple wins ===
8 wins

- Enrique Iglesias

6 wins

- Shakira

5 wins

- Bad Bunny

3 wins

- Becky G

2 wins

- Marc Anthony
- Jennifer Lopez
- Ricky Martin

=== Multiple nominations ===
12 nominations

- Enrique Iglesias

10 nominations

- Shakira

6 nominations

- Bad Bunny

5 nominations

- Marc Anthony
- Daddy Yankee
- Karol G

4 nominations

- Rauw Alejandro
- Becky G
- Ricky Martin
- Rosalía

3 nominations

- Jennifer Lopez
- Luis Miguel
- Natti Natasha
- Romeo Santos

2 nominations

- Luis Fonsi
- Don Omar
- Peso Pluma
- Pitbull
- Tito Double P
- Kali Uchis
- Wisin & Yandel

== See also ==
- Latin American Music Awards
