= American Music Awards of 2001 =

US television program

28th Annual American Music Awards
- Date: January 8, 2001
- Location: Shrine Auditorium, Los Angeles, California
- Country: United States
- Hosted by: Britney Spears; LL Cool J

Highlights
- Most awards: Faith Hill (3)
- Most nominations: Faith Hill (4)

Television/radio coverage
- Network: ABC
- Runtime: 180 min.
- Produced by: Dick Clark Productions

The 28th Annual American Music Awards were held on January 8, 2001, at the Shrine Auditorium, in Los Angeles, California. The awards recognized the most popular artists and albums from the year 2000. The show was hosted by Britney Spears and LL Cool J.

== Performances ==
Artist(s)	Song(s)
Pre-show
Billy Gilman	"One Voice"
Main show
Jennifer Lopez	"Love Don't Cost a Thing"
3 Doors Down	"Loser"
Toni Braxton	"Spanish Guitar"
Britney Spears	"Stronger"
Outkast	"Ms. Jackson"
Martina McBride	"It's My Time"
Jessica Simpson	"I Wanna Love You Forever"
Aerosmith	"Jaded"
P!nk	"Most Girls"
Ricky Martin	"Nobody Wants to Be Lonely"
SHeDAISY	"I Will… But"
Marilyn Manson	"Disposable Teens"

== Presenters ==
- *NSYNC – presented Favourite Soul/R&B Album
- LeAnn Rimes – introduced Jennifer Lopez
- Mya and Creed – presented Favourite Pop/Rock New Artist
- Brian McKnight and Jo Dee Messina – Favourite Country Album
- Mandy Moore – introduced 3 Doors Down
- Kelly Price and BBMak – presented Favourite Soul/R&B Band, Duo or Group
- Run-DMC (Joseph “Run” Simmons and Jason “Jam Master Jay” Mizell) – introduced Toni Braxton
- Daryl Hannah and Nelly – presented Favourite Alternative Artist
- Carmen Electra and Ja Rule – presented Favourite Hip-Hop Artist
- Tiffani Thiessen and 98 Degrees – presented Favourite Pop/Rock Male Artist
- LL Cool J (host) – introduced Britney Spears
- Lonestar – presented Favourite Country Female Artist
- Snoop Dogg and Bow Wow – introduced Outkast
- Wendie Malick, Shaggy and Tyrese Gibson – presented Favourite Soul/R&B New Artist
- Marc Anthony – introduced Martina McBride
- Shaquille O'Neal – presented the Award of Merit to Janet Jackson
- Destiny's Child – presented Favourite Pop/Rock Album
- Backstreet Boys – introduced Jessica Simpson
- Teddy Chester and Caroline Rhea – presented Favourite Country Band, Duo or Group
- Mystikal and Uncle Kracker – presented Favourite Soul/R&B Female Artist
- Vincent Pastore and Laura Prepon – presented the International Artist Award to Aerosmith
- Donell Jones, Vitamin C and Aaron Carter – presented Favourite Country New Artist
- Sisqó – introduced Pink
- Kid Rock – presented a tribute to passed musical artists of 2000
- William Shatner and Brooks & Dunn – presented Internet Fans Artist of the Year
- Cindy Margolis and O-Town – presented Favourite Pop/Rock Band, Duo or Group
- Brooke Shields – introduced Ricky Martin
- David Boreanaz and Dream – presented Favourite Soul/R&B Male Artist
- Bill Maher – introduced SHeDAISY
- Melissa Etheridge and Alfonso Ribeiro – presented Favourite Latin Music Artist
- Vertical Horizon – presented Favourite Country Male Artist
- Britney Spears (host) – introduced Marilyn Manson
- Melissa Joan Hart and Debbie Gibson – presented Favourite Pop/Rock Female Artist

== Winners and nominees ==
Subcategory	Winner	Nominees
Internet Fans Artist of the Year
Artist of the Year	'N Sync	Creed; Destiny's Child; Eminem; Faith Hill; Britney Spears
Pop/Rock Category
Favorite Pop/Rock Male Artist	Kid Rock	Marc Anthony; Eminem
Favorite Pop/Rock Female Artist	Faith Hill	Christina Aguilera; Celine Dion; Britney Spears
Favorite Pop/Rock Band/Duo/Group	Backstreet Boys	Creed 'N Sync
Favorite Pop/Rock Album	Human Clay - Creed	No Strings Attached - 'N Sync; Oops!… I Did It Again - Britney Spears
Favorite Pop/Rock New Artist	3 Doors Down	Macy Gray; Jessica Simpson
Soul/R&B Category
Favorite Soul/R&B Male Artist	Brian McKnight	D'Angelo; Sisqó
Favorite Soul/R&B Female Artist	Toni Braxton	Whitney Houston; Kelly Price
Favorite Soul/R&B Band/Duo/Group	Destiny's Child	Jagged Edge; Lucy Pearl
Favorite Soul/R&B Album	The Heat - Toni Braxton	The Writing's on the Wall - Destiny's Child; Unleash the Dragon - Sisqó
Favorite Soul/R&B New Artist	Donell Jones	Mary Mary; P!nk
Country Category
Favorite Country Male Artist	Tim McGraw	Alan Jackson; George Strait
Favorite Country Female Artist	Faith Hill	Martina McBride; Reba McEntire
Favorite Country Band/Duo/Group	Dixie Chicks	Brooks & Dunn; Lonestar
Favorite Country Album	Breathe - Faith Hill	Under the Influence - Alan Jackson; How Do You Like Me Now?! - Toby Keith
Favorite Country New Artist	Billy Gilman	Alecia Elliott; Keith Urban
Adult Contemporary Category
Favorite Adult Contemporary Artist	Celine Dion	Marc Anthony; Faith Hill
Alternative Category
Favorite Alternative Artist	Creed	Limp Bizkit; Red Hot Chili Peppers
Rap/Hip-Hop Category
Favorite Rap/Hip-Hop Artist	Dr. Dre	DMX; Eminem
Latin Category
Favorite Latin Artist	Enrique Iglesias	Marc Anthony; Shakira
Soundtrack Category
Favorite Soundtrack	Mission: Impossible 2	Coyote Ugly; Nutty Professor II: The Klumps
International Artist
Aerosmith
Merit
Janet Jackson
