= American Music Awards Icon Award =

American Music Award

The American Music Awards Icon Award was first introduced on the American Music Awards of 2013. Producer Larry Klein explained that the "Icon Award was created to honor an artist whose body of work has made a profound influence over pop music on a global level". The first winner was Bajan singer Rihanna.

== Winners ==
- 2013: Rihanna
- 2022: Lionel Richie
- 2025: Janet Jackson
