= American Music Awards of 2018 =

American Music Awards

46th Annual American Music Awards
- American Music Awards of 2018 logo
- Date: October 9, 2018
- Location: Microsoft Theater; Los Angeles, California
- Country: United States
- Hosted by: Tracee Ellis Ross

Highlights
- Most awards: Taylor Swift; Camila Cabello (4 each)
- Most nominations: Cardi B; Drake (8 each)
- Website: American Music Awards

Television/radio coverage
- Network: ABC
- Runtime: 131 minutes
- Viewership: 6.59 million
- Produced by: Dick Clark Productions

The 46th Annual American Music Awards were held on October 9, 2018, at the Microsoft Theater in Los Angeles, California. It aired live on ABC and was hosted by Tracee Ellis Ross. Cardi B and Drake were the most-nominated artists with eight nominations each, while Taylor Swift and Camila Cabello were the most-awarded artists with four awards each. Rapper and singer XXXTentacion posthumously won Favorite Soul/R&B album nearly four months after his death. His mother, Cleopatra Bernard, accepted the award on his behalf.

== Performances ==
Artist(s)	Song(s)
Taylor Swift	"I Did Something Bad"
Twenty One Pilots	"Jumpsuit"
Mariah Carey	"With You"
Shawn Mendes; Zedd	"Lost in Japan" (Remix)
Cardi B Bad Bunny; J Balvin	"I Like It"
Benny Blanco; Halsey; Khalid	"Eastside"
Post Malone; Ty Dolla Sign	"Psycho" "Better Now"
Dua Lipa	"One Kiss" "Electricity"
Jennifer Lopez	"Limitless"
Camila Cabello	"Consequences"
Ciara; Missy Elliott	"Level Up" "Dose"
Carrie Underwood	"Spinning Bottles"
Panic! at the Disco	"Bohemian Rhapsody"^{[a]}
Gladys Knight; Donnie McClurkin; CeCe Winans; Ledisi; Mary Mary	Tribute to Aretha Franklin:^{[b]} "Amazing Grace" "Climb Higher Mountains" "Mary Don't You Weep" "How I Got Over" "The Old Landmark"

Notes

- ^{^[a]} Broadcast live from Sydney, Australia.
- ^{^[b]} With musical director Ricky Minor.

== Presenters ==
- Bebe Rexha and Florida Georgia Line - presented Favorite Rap/Hip-Hop Artist
- Amber Heard - introduced Twenty One Pilots
- Macaulay Culkin- presented Favorite Pop/Rock Male Artist
- Heidi Klum - presented Tour of the Year
- Chloe x Halle - introduced Mariah Carey
- John Stamos and Busy Philipps - presented Favorite Soul/R&B Male Artist
- Tracee Ellis Ross - introduced Cardi B, Bad Bunny & J Balvin
- Ashlee Simpson and Evan Ross - presented Favorite Pop/Rock Song
- Sara Gilbert and Thomas Rhett - presented Favorite Country Female Artist
- Normani and Liza Koshy - introduced Benny Blanco, Khalid and Halsey
- Billy Eichner and Kathryn Hahn - presented Favorite Adult Contemporary Artist
- Constance Wu and Rita Ora - presented Favorite Pop/Rock Duo or Group
- The Chainsmokers and Kelsea Ballerini - introduced Post Malone and Ty Dolla Sign
- Vanessa Hudgens - introduced Jennifer Lopez
- Lauren Daigle and Kane Brown - presented Favorite Soul/R&B Album
- Amandla Stenberg - presented Favorite Pop/Rock Album
- Taran Killam and Leighton Meester - presented Favorite Country Male Artist
- Tracee Ellis Ross - introduced Ciara and Missy Elliott
- Tyra Banks - presented New Artist of the Year
- Tracee Ellis Ross - introduced Carrie Underwood
- Rami Malek, Joseph Mazzello and Gwilym Lee - introduced Panic! at the Disco
- Lenny Kravitz - presented Artist of the Year

== Winners and nominees ==
Artist of the Year	New Artist of the Year
Taylor Swift; Drake; Imagine Dragons; Post Malone; Ed Sheeran	Camila Cabello; Cardi B; Dua Lipa; Khalid; XXXTentacion
Collaboration of the Year	Favorite Music Video
"Havana" - Camila Cabello featuring Young Thug; "Finesse" - Bruno Mars and Cardi B; "Rockstar" - Post Malone featuring 21 Savage; "Meant to Be" - Bebe Rexha and Florida Georgia Line; "The Middle" - Zedd, Maren Morris and Grey	"Havana" - Camila Cabello featuring Young Thug; "Bodak Yellow" - Cardi B; "God's Plan" - Drake
Tour of the Year	Favorite Social Artist
Taylor Swift - Reputation Stadium Tour; Beyoncé and Jay-Z - On the Run II Tour; Bruno Mars - 24K Magic World Tour; Ed Sheeran - ÷ Tour; U2 - Experience + Innocence Tour	BTS; Cardi B; Ariana Grande; Demi Lovato; Shawn Mendes
Favorite Soundtrack	Favorite Male Artist – Pop/Rock
Black Panther; The Greatest Showman; The Fate of the Furious	Post Malone; Drake; Ed Sheeran
Favorite Female Artist – Pop/Rock	Favorite Duo or Group – Pop/Rock
Taylor Swift; Camila Cabello; Cardi B	Migos; Imagine Dragons; Maroon 5
Favorite Album – Pop/Rock	Favorite Song – Pop/Rock
Reputation - Taylor Swift; Scorpion - Drake; ÷ (Divide) - Ed Sheeran	"Havana" - Camila Cabello featuring Young Thug; "God's Plan" - Drake; "Perfect" - Ed Sheeran
Favorite Male Artist – Country	Favorite Female Artist – Country
Kane Brown; Luke Bryan; Thomas Rhett	Carrie Underwood; Kelsea Ballerini; Maren Morris
Favorite Duo or Group – Country	Favorite Album – Country
Florida Georgia Line; Dan + Shay; LANCO	Kane Brown - Kane Brown; This One's for You - Luke Combs; Life Changes - Thomas Rhett
Favorite Song – Country	Favorite Artist – Rap/Hip-Hop
"Heaven" - Kane Brown; "Tequila" - Dan + Shay; "Meant to Be" - Bebe Rexha and Florida Georgia Line	Cardi B; Drake; Post Malone
Favorite Album – Rap/Hip-Hop	Favorite Song – Rap/Hip-Hop
Beerbongs & Bentleys - Post Malone; Scorpion - Drake; Luv Is Rage 2 - Lil Uzi Vert	"Bodak Yellow (Money Moves)" - Cardi B; "God's Plan" - Drake; "Rockstar" - Post Malone featuring 21 Savage
Favorite Male Artist – Soul/R&B	Favorite Female Artist – Soul/R&B
Khalid; Bruno Mars; The Weeknd	Rihanna; Ella Mai; SZA
Favorite Album – Soul/R&B	Favorite Song – Soul/R&B
17 - XXXTentacion; American Teen - Khalid; CTRL - SZA	"Finesse" - Bruno Mars and Cardi B; "Young, Dumb & Broke" - Khalid; "Boo'd Up" - Ella Mai
Favorite Artist – Alternative Rock	Favorite Artist – Adult Contemporary
Panic! at the Disco; Imagine Dragons; Portugal. The Man	Shawn Mendes; P!nk; Ed Sheeran
Favorite Artist – Latin	Favorite Artist – Contemporary Inspirational
Daddy Yankee; J Balvin; Ozuna	Lauren Daigle; MercyMe; Zach Williams
Favorite Artist – Electronic Dance Music
Marshmello; The Chainsmokers; Zedd
