= American Music Award for New Artist of the Year =

Annual music award

American Music Awards for New Artist of the Year
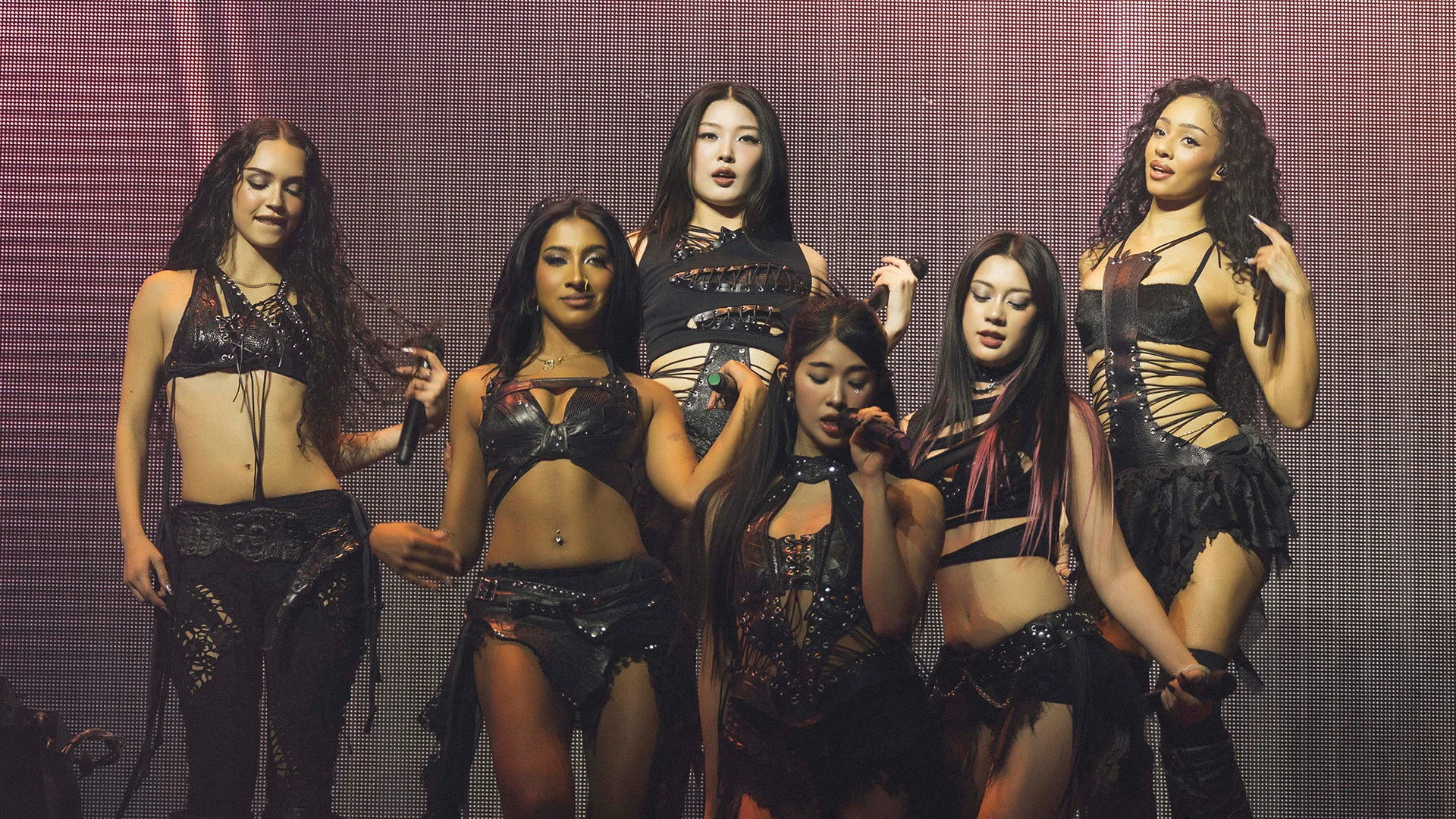
- Katseye is the most recent recipient
- Country: United States
- Presented by: American Music Awards
- First award: 2004
- Currently held by: Katseye
- Website: theamas.com

The American Music Award for New Artist of the Year has been awarded since 2004. Years reflect the year during which the awards were presented, for works released in the previous year (until 2003 onward, when awards were handed out on November of the same year). Previous names of the award include Favorite Breakthrough Artist (2004) and Breakthrough Artist (2005–2010).

== Winners and nominees ==
=== 2000s ===
Year	Artist	Ref
2004 (32nd)
2004 (32nd)	Gretchen Wilson	
2004 (32nd)	Maroon 5	
2004 (32nd)	Kanye West	
2005 (33rd)
2005 (33rd)	Sugarland	
2005 (33rd)	The Killers	
2005 (33rd)	Jesse McCartney	
2006 (34th)
2006 (34th)	Carrie Underwood	
2006 (34th)	Chamillionaire	
2006 (34th)	The Pussycat Dolls	
2007 (35th)
2007 (35th)	Daughtry	
2007 (35th)	Plain White T's	
2007 (35th)	Robin Thicke	
2008 (36th)
2008 (36th)	Jonas Brothers	
2008 (36th)	Colbie Caillat	
2008 (36th)	Flo Rida	
2008 (36th)	Paramore	
2008 (36th)	The-Dream	
2009 (37th)
2009 (37th)	Gloriana	
2009 (37th)	Keri Hilson	
2009 (37th)	Kid Cudi	
2009 (37th)	Lady Gaga	

=== 2010s ===
Year	Artist	Ref
2010 (38th)
2010 (38th)	Justin Bieber	
2010 (38th)	B.o.B	
2010 (38th)	Taio Cruz	
2010 (38th)	Jason Derulo	
2010 (38th)	Kesha	
2010 (38th)	Lady Antebellum	
2010 (38th)	Travie McCoy	
2010 (38th)	Mike Posner	
2011 (39th)
2011 (39th)	Hot Chelle Rae	
2011 (39th)	Marsha Ambrosius	
2011 (39th)	The Band Perry	
2011 (39th)	Foster the People	
2011 (39th)	LMFAO	
2011 (39th)	Miguel	
2011 (39th)	Thompson Square	
2011 (39th)	Wiz Khalifa	
2012 (40th)
2012 (40th)	Carly Rae Jepsen	
2012 (40th)	fun.	
2012 (40th)	Gotye	
2012 (40th)	J. Cole	
2012 (40th)	The Wanted	
2013 (41st)
2013 (41st)	Ariana Grande	
2013 (41st)	Florida Georgia Line	
2013 (41st)	Imagine Dragons	
2013 (41st)	Macklemore & Ryan Lewis	
2013 (41st)	Phillip Phillips	
2014 (42nd)
2014 (42nd)	5 Seconds of Summer	
2014 (42nd)	Iggy Azalea	
2014 (42nd)	Bastille	
2014 (42nd)	Sam Smith	
2014 (42nd)	Meghan Trainor	
2015 (43rd)
2015 (43rd)	Sam Hunt	
2015 (43rd)	Fetty Wap	
2015 (43rd)	Tove Lo	
2015 (43rd)	Walk the Moon	
2015 (43rd)	The Weeknd	
2016 (44th)
2016 (44th)	Zayn	
2016 (44th)	Alessia Cara	
2016 (44th)	The Chainsmokers	
2016 (44th)	DNCE	
2016 (44th)	Shawn Mendes	
2017 (45th)
2017 (45th)	Niall Horan	
2017 (45th)	James Arthur	
2017 (45th)	Julia Michaels	
2017 (45th)	Post Malone	
2017 (45th)	Rae Sremmurd	
2018 (46th)
2018 (46th)	Camila Cabello	
2018 (46th)	Cardi B	
2018 (46th)	Dua Lipa	
2018 (46th)	Khalid	
2018 (46th)	XXXTentacion	
2019 (47th)
2019 (47th)	Billie Eilish	
2019 (47th)	Luke Combs	
2019 (47th)	Lil Nas X	
2019 (47th)	Lizzo	
2019 (47th)	Ella Mai	

=== 2020s ===
Year	Artist	Ref
2020 (48th)
2020 (48th)	Doja Cat	
2020 (48th)	DaBaby	
2020 (48th)	Lil Baby	
2020 (48th)	Lewis Capaldi	
2020 (48th)	Roddy Ricch	
2020 (48th)	Megan Thee Stallion	
2021 (49th)
2021 (49th)	Olivia Rodrigo	
2021 (49th)	24kGoldn	
2021 (49th)	Giveon	
2021 (49th)	Masked Wolf	
2021 (49th)	The Kid Laroi	
2022 (50th)
2022 (50th)	Dove Cameron	
2022 (50th)	Gayle	
2022 (50th)	Steve Lacy	
2022 (50th)	Latto	
2022 (50th)	Måneskin	
2023 – 24	—N/a	
2025 (51st)
2025 (51st)	Gracie Abrams	
2025 (51st)	Benson Boone	
2025 (51st)	Chappell Roan	
2025 (51st)	Shaboozey	
2025 (51st)	Teddy Swims	
2025 (51st)	Tommy Richman	
2026 (52nd)
2026 (52nd)	Katseye	
2026 (52nd)	Alex Warren	
2026 (52nd)	Ella Langley	
2026 (52nd)	Leon Thomas	
2026 (52nd)	Olivia Dean	
2026 (52nd)	Sombr	
