= American Music Award for Best Soundtrack =

Annual award for soundtracks in films and television shows

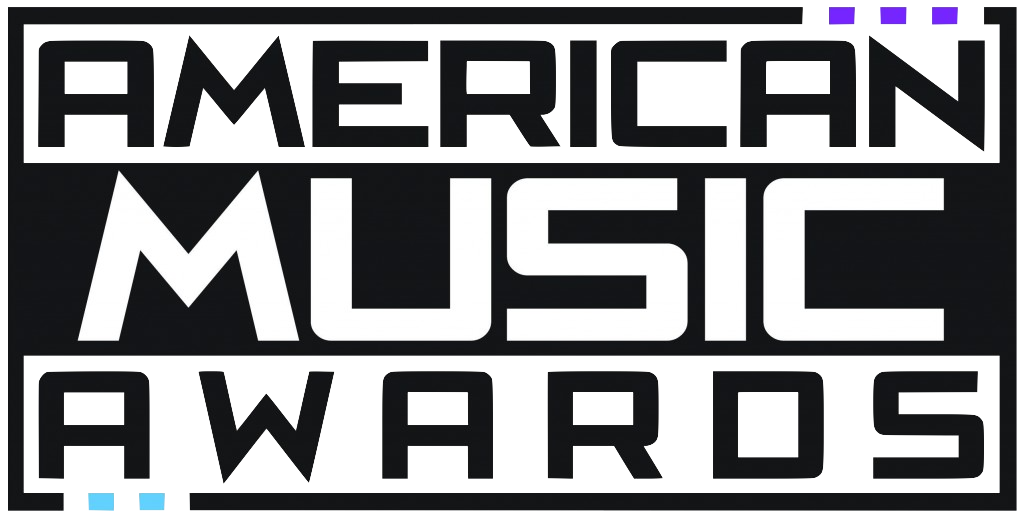
- Awarded for: Soundtracks from films and television shows
- Country: United States
- Presented by: American Music Awards
- First award: 1996
- Currently held by: KPop Demon Hunters
- Website: theamas.com

The American Music Award for Best Soundtrack has been awarded since 1996. Years reflect the year in which the awards were presented, for works released in the previous year (until 2003 onward when awards were handed out in November of the same year). The Pitch Perfect film franchise is the only franchise to have multiple awards in this category with two wins in 2013 and 2015. Michael Jackson is the most nominated male artist with 7 nominations and is the only singer to have won this award in three separate decades (80s, 90s and 00s). The award was previous known as Favorite Soundtrack until the 2026 ceremony, where the award was renamed to Best Soundtrack.

== Winners and nominees ==
=== 1990s ===
Year	Soundtrack	Ref
1996 (23rd)
1996 (23rd)	The Lion King: Original Motion Picture Soundtrack	
1996 (23rd)	Dangerous Minds: Music from the Motion Picture	
1996 (23rd)	Forrest Gump: The Soundtrack	
1997 (24th)
1997 (24th)	Waiting to Exhale: Original Soundtrack Album	
1997 (24th)	The Nutty Professor Soundtrack	
1997 (24th)	The Crow: City of Angels	
1998 (25th)
1998 (25th)	Men in Black: The Album	
1998 (25th)	Evita	
1998 (25th)	The Preacher's Wife: Original Soundtrack Album	
1999 (26th)
1999 (26th)	Titanic: Music from the Motion Picture	
1999 (26th)	Armageddon: The Album	
1999 (26th)	City of Angels: Music from the Motion Picture	

=== 2000s ===
Year	Soundtrack	Ref
2000 (27th)
2000 (27th)	Wild Wild West	
2000 (27th)	Austin Powers: The Spy Who Shagged Me: Music from the Motion Picture	
2000 (27th)	Runaway Bride	
2001 (28th)
2001 (28th)	Music from and Inspired by Mission: Impossible 2	
2001 (28th)	Coyote Ugly	
2001 (28th)	Nutty Professor II: The Klumps Soundtrack	
2002 (29th)
2002 (29th)	Save the Last Dance: Music from the Motion Picture	
2002 (29th)	American Pie 2	
2002 (29th)	Moulin Rouge! Music from Baz Luhrmann's Film	
2003 (30th)
2003 (30th)	Music from and Inspired by Spider-Man	
2003 (30th)	Lilo & Stitch: An Original Walt Disney Records Soundtrack	
2003 (30th)	The Scorpion King	
2003 – 06	—N/a	
2007 (35th)
2007 (35th)	High School Musical 2	
2007 (35th)	Dreamgirls: Music from the Motion Picture	
2007 (35th)	Hairspray: Soundtrack to the Motion Picture	
2008 (36th)
2008 (36th)	Alvin and the Chipmunks: Original Motion Picture Soundtrack	
2008 (36th)	Music from the Motion Picture Juno	
2008 (36th)	Mamma Mia! The Movie Soundtrack	
2009 (37th)
2009 (37th)	Twilight: Original Motion Picture Soundtrack	
2009 (37th)	Hannah Montana: The Movie	
2009 (37th)	Hannah Montana 3	

=== 2010s ===
Year	Soundtrack	Ref
2010 (38th)
2010 (38th)	Glee: The Music, Volume 3 Showstoppers	
2010 (38th)	Iron Man 2	
2010 (38th)	The Twilight Saga: Eclipse (Original Motion Picture Soundtrack)	
2011 – 12	—N/a	
2013 (41st)
2013 (41st)	Pitch Perfect: Original Motion Picture Soundtrack	
2013 (41st)	The Great Gatsby: Music from Baz Luhrmann's Film	
2013 (41st)	Les Misérables: Highlights from the Motion Picture Soundtrack	
2014 (42nd)
2014 (42nd)	Frozen: Original Motion Picture Soundtrack	
2014 (42nd)	The Fault in Our Stars (Music from the Motion Picture)	
2014 (42nd)	Guardians of the Galaxy: Awesome Mix, Vol. 1	
2015 (43rd)
2015 (43rd)	Pitch Perfect 2	
2015 (43rd)	Empire: Original Soundtrack from Season 1	
2015 (43rd)	Fifty Shades of Grey: Original Motion Picture Soundtrack	
2016 (44th)
2016 (44th)	Music from the Motion Picture Purple Rain	
2016 (44th)	Star Wars: The Force Awakens – Original Motion Picture Soundtrack	
2016 (44th)	Suicide Squad: The Album	
2017 (45th)
2017 (45th)	Moana: Original Motion Picture Soundtrack	
2017 (45th)	Guardians of the Galaxy, Vol. 2: Awesome Mix Vol. 2	
2017 (45th)	Trolls: Original Motion Picture Soundtrack	
2018 (46th)
2018 (46th)	Black Panther: The Album	
2018 (46th)	The Fate of the Furious: The Album	
2018 (46th)	The Greatest Showman: Original Motion Picture Soundtrack	
2019 (47th)
2019 (47th)	Bohemian Rhapsody: The Original Soundtrack	
2019 (47th)	A Star Is Born	
2019 (47th)	Spider-Man: Into the Spider-Verse	

=== 2020s ===
Year	Soundtrack	Ref
2020 (48th)
2020 (48th)	Birds of Prey: The Album	
2020 (48th)	Frozen 2 (Original Motion Picture Soundtrack)	
2020 (48th)	Trolls World Tour: Original Motion Picture Soundtrack	
2021	—N/a	
2022 (50th)	Elvis	
2022 (50th)	Encanto	
2022 (50th)	Sing 2	
2022 (50th)	Stranger Things: Music from the Netflix Original Series, Season 4	
2022 (50th)	Top Gun: Maverick	
2023 – 24	—N/a	
2025 (51st)
2025 (51st)	Arcane League of Legends: Season 2	
2025 (51st)	Hazbin Hotel	
2025 (51st)	Moana 2	
2025 (51st)	Twisters: The Album	
2025 (51st)	Wicked: The Soundtrack	
2026 (52nd)
2026 (52nd)	KPop Demon Hunters	
2026 (52nd)	F1 the Album	
2026 (52nd)	Hazbin Hotel: Season Two	
2026 (52nd)	Wicked: For Good	
2026 (52nd)	Wuthering Heights	
