= American Music Awards of 2020 =

Annual event

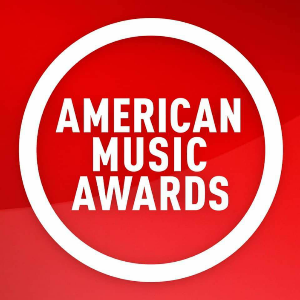
- American Music Awards of 2020 logo
- Date: November 22, 2020
- Venue: Microsoft Theater, Los Angeles, California
- Country: United States
- Hosted by: Taraji P. Henson

Highlights
- Most wins: Taylor Swift; the Weeknd; Dan + Shay; Justin Bieber (3 each)
- Most nominations: Roddy Ricch; the Weeknd (8 each)
- Website: theamas.com

Television/radio coverage
- Network: ABC
- Produced by: Dick Clark Productions

The 48th Annual American Music Awards were held on November 22, 2020, at the Microsoft Theater in Los Angeles, recognizing the most popular artists and albums of 2020. Nominees were officially announced live on October 26, 2020, on Good Morning America by Dua Lipa. Taylor Swift, the Weeknd, Dan + Shay and Justin Bieber were the most awarded artists with three awards each. Roddy Ricch and the Weeknd were the most nominated artists with eight nominations each, followed by Megan Thee Stallion with five. Taraji P. Henson hosted the ceremony.

== Background ==
On July 17, 2020, ABC and Dick Clark Productions issued a joint statement announcing the ceremony as well as the date of the ceremony, November 22 of the same year. The ceremony took place at the Microsoft Theater in Los Angeles. Taraji P. Henson was announced as the host of the ceremony on November 2, 2020.

== Performances ==
List of musical performances
Artist(s)	Song(s)
Justin Bieber	"Lonely" (with Benny Blanco) "Holy" "Monster" (with Shawn Mendes)
Katy Perry Darius Rucker	"As The Deer" "Only Love"
The Weeknd	"In Your Eyes" (with Kenny G) "Save Your Tears"^{[a]}
Megan Thee Stallion	"Body"
Lewis Capaldi	"Before You Go"
Billie Eilish Finneas	"Therefore I Am"
Nelly City Spud	"Country Grammar (Hot Shit)" "E.I." "Ride wit Me"
Jennifer Lopez Maluma	"Pa' Ti + Lonely"
Dua Lipa	"Levitating"^{[b]}
Bell Biv DeVoe	"Poison" "Do Me!"
Dan + Shay	"I Should Probably Go to Bed"
24kGoldn Iann Dior	"Mood"
Shawn Mendes	"Wonder"
Lil Baby	"Emotionally Scarred"
Bebe Rexha Doja Cat	"Baby, I'm Jealous"
Machine Gun Kelly Travis Barker	"Bloody Valentine" "My Ex's Best Friend"
BTS	"Dynamite" "Life Goes On"^{[c]}

Notes

- ^{^[a]} Live from 4th Street Bridge, in downtown Los Angeles.
- ^{^[b]} Broadcast live from the Royal Albert Hall, in London, England.
- ^{^[c]} Pre-recorded at Seoul Olympic Stadium, in Seoul, South Korea.

== Presenters ==
Presenters were announced on November 19, 2020.

- Taraji P. Henson – main show host
- Ciara – presented Favorite Album – Soul/R&B
- Cara Delevingne – presented Favorite Song – Pop/Rock
- Derek Hough – presented Favorite Song – Country
- Tayshia Adams – presented Favorite Female Artist – Soul/R&B
- Bad Bunny – presented Favorite Female Artist – Latin
- Laverne Cox – presented Favorite Song – Rap/Hip-Hop
- Becky G – presented Favorite Song – Soul/R&B
- Paris Hilton – presented New Artist of the Year
- Anthony Anderson – presented Favorite Duo/Group – Pop/Rock
- Christian Serratos - presented Favorite Album – Latin
- Kristin Cavallari - presented Favorite Male Artist – Soul/R&B
- Megan Fox – introduced Machine Gun Kelly and Travis Barker
- G-Eazy - presented Collaboration of the Year
- Taraji P. Henson – presented Artist of the Year
- David Dobrik - advertised T-Mobile

== Winners and nominees ==
Nominees were jointly announced by singer Dua Lipa and Good Morning America on October 26, 2020. Roddy Ricch and the Weeknd were the most nominated artists, with eight nominations each. Megan Thee Stallion received five nominations, while Bad Bunny, DaBaby, Doja Cat, Justin Bieber, Lady Gaga and Taylor Swift all tied with four.

Winners are listed first and highlighted in bold.

Artist of the Year	New Artist of the Year
**Taylor Swift**; Justin Bieber; Post Malone; Roddy Ricch; The Weeknd	**Doja Cat**; DaBaby; Lil Baby; Lewis Capaldi; Roddy Ricch; Megan Thee Stallion
Favorite Music Video	Collaboration of the Year
**Taylor Swift – "Cardigan"**; Doja Cat – "Say So"; Future featuring Drake – "Life Is Good"; Lady Gaga and Ariana Grande – "Rain on Me"; The Weeknd – "Blinding Lights"	**Dan + Shay and Justin Bieber – "10,000 Hours"**; Cardi B featuring Megan Thee Stallion – "WAP"; DaBaby featuring Roddy Ricch – "Rockstar"; Lady Gaga and Ariana Grande – "Rain On Me"; Megan Thee Stallion featuring Beyoncé – "Savage (Remix)"
Favorite Male Artist – Pop/Rock	Favorite Female Artist – Pop/Rock
**Justin Bieber**; Post Malone; The Weeknd	**Taylor Swift**; Dua Lipa; Lady Gaga
Favorite Male Artist – Rap/Hip-Hop	Favorite Female Artist – Rap/Hip-Hop
**Juice Wrld**; DaBaby; Roddy Ricch	**Nicki Minaj**; Cardi B; Megan Thee Stallion
Favorite Male Artist – Country	Favorite Female Artist – Country
**Kane Brown**; Luke Combs; Morgan Wallen	**Maren Morris**; Gabby Barrett; Miranda Lambert
Favorite Male Artist – Soul/R&B	Favorite Female Artist – Soul/R&B
**The Weeknd**; Chris Brown; John Legend	**Doja Cat**; Jhené Aiko; Summer Walker
Favorite Male Artist – Latin	Favorite Female Artist – Latin
**Bad Bunny**; J Balvin; Ozuna	**Becky G**; Karol G; Rosalía
Favorite Artist – Alternative Rock	Favorite Artist – Adult Contemporary
**Twenty One Pilots**; Billie Eilish; Tame Impala	**Jonas Brothers**; Lewis Capaldi; Maroon 5
Favorite Artist – Electronic Dance Music	Favorite Artist – Contemporary Inspirational
**Lady Gaga**; Kygo; Marshmello	**Lauren Daigle**; For King & Country; Kanye West
Favorite Duo or Group – Pop/Rock	Favorite Duo or Group – Country
**BTS**; Jonas Brothers; Maroon 5	**Dan + Shay**; Florida Georgia Line; Old Dominion
Favorite Song – Pop/Rock	Favorite Album – Pop/Rock
**Dua Lipa – "Don't Start Now"**; Lewis Capaldi – "Someone You Loved"; Post Malone – "Circles"; Roddy Ricch – "The Box"; The Weeknd – "Blinding Lights"	**Harry Styles – Fine Line**; Taylor Swift – Folklore; The Weeknd – After Hours
Favorite Song – Rap/Hip-Hop	Favorite Album – Rap/Hip-Hop
**Cardi B featuring Megan Thee Stallion – "WAP"**; DaBaby featuring Roddy Ricch – "Rockstar"; Roddy Ricch – "The Box"	**Roddy Ricch – Please Excuse Me For Being Antisocial**; Lil Baby – My Turn; Lil Uzi Vert – Eternal Atake
Favorite Song – Country	Favorite Album – Country
**Dan + Shay and Justin Bieber – "10,000 Hours"**; Maren Morris – "The Bones"; Blake Shelton and Gwen Stefani – "Nobody but You"	**Blake Shelton – Fully Loaded: God's Country**; Luke Combs – What You See Is What You Get; Morgan Wallen – If I Know Me
Favorite Song – Soul/R&B	Favorite Album – Soul/R&B
**The Weeknd – "Heartless"**; Chris Brown featuring Drake – "No Guidance"; Summer Walker – "Playing Games"	**The Weeknd – After Hours**; Doja Cat – Hot Pink; Summer Walker – Over It
Favorite Song – Latin	Favorite Album – Latin
**Karol G & Nicki Minaj - "Tusa"**; Bad Bunny - "Vete"; Black Eyed Peas X J Balvin - "Ritmo"	**Bad Bunny – YHLQMDLG**; Anuel AA – Emmanuel; Bad Bunny – Las que no iban a salir
Favorite Soundtrack	Favorite Social Artist
**Birds of Prey: The Album – Various Artists**; Frozen 2 – Various Artists; Trolls: World Tour – Various Artists	**BTS**; Billie Eilish; Exo; Ariana Grande; NCT 127
