= American Music Awards of 1999 =

US television program

26th Annual American Music Awards
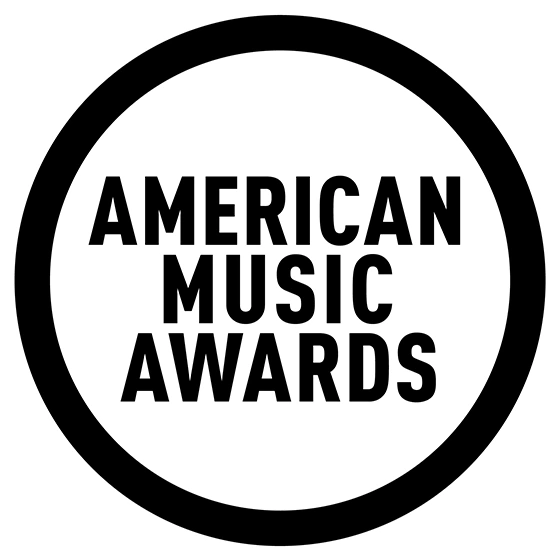
- American Music Awards logo since 2019
- Date: January 11, 1999
- Location: Shrine Auditorium, Los Angeles, California
- Country: United States
- Hosted by: Brandy; Melissa Joan Hart

Highlights
- Most awards: Will Smith (3)
- Most nominations: Shania Twain (5)

Television/radio coverage
- Network: ABC
- Runtime: 180 minutes
- Produced by: Dick Clark Productions

The 26th Annual American Music Awards on January 11, 1999, at the Shrine Auditorium in Los Angeles. The awards recognized the most popular artists and albums from the year 1998.

== Performances ==
Artist(s)	Song(s)
Whitney Houston; Babyface (on piano)	"Until You Come Back"
Whitney Houston; Wyclef Jean; Babyface (on piano)	"My Love Is Your Love"
Backstreet Boys	"All I Have to Give" "Everybody (Backstreet's Back)" (Matty's Remix)
Dixie Chicks	"Wide Open Spaces"
Third Eye Blind	"Graduate"
K-Ci & JoJo	"All My Life"
Next	"Too Close"
K-Ci & JoJo; Next	"Love and Happiness"
Blondie; Coolio; Wu-Tang Clan; Mo B. Dick	"No Exit"
Brian McKnight; 98 Degrees; Shawn Mullins; *NSYNC; LeAnn Rimes	Tribute to Billy Joel: "Piano Man" "Uptown Girl" "Allentown" "You May Be Right" "Just the Way You Are"
Brandy	"Have You Ever?"
Cher	"Believe"
Burt Bacharach; Elvis Costello	"Toledo"
Trisha Yearwood; Garth Brooks	"Powerful Thing"
Goo Goo Dolls	"Slide"
Master P Silkk the Shocker; Mo B. Dick	"Goodbye To My Homies"
Los Tigres del Norte	"Golpes en el Corazón"

== Presenters ==
- Brandy and Melissa Joan Hart (hosts) – opened the show and presented Favorite Soul/R&B Album
- Will Smith – introduced Whitney Houston
- Monica and *NSYNC – presented Favorite Country Album
- Deborah Cox and Issac Hayes – presented Favorite Adult Contemporary Artist
- Freddie Prinze Jr. and Tatyana Ali – presented Favorite Rap/Hip-Hop Artist
- LeAnn Rimes and David Boreanaz – presented Favorite Country Band, Duo or Group
- Sinbad and The Kinleys – presented Favorite Pop/Rock New Artist
- Faith Evans and Everclear – introduced Blondie, Coolio and Wu-Tang Clan
- Kathy Kinney and Sugar Ray – presented Favorite Soul/R&B Band, Duo or Group
- Garth Brooks – presented the Award of Merit to Billy Joel
- Kiss – presented Favorite Pop/Rock Album
- Boy George and Vonda Shepard – presented Favorite Soundtrack
- Paula Abdul – introduced Cher
- Toby Keith and Randy Travis – presented Favorite Country New Artist
- Carmen Electra and Dru Hill – presented Favorite Soul/R&B New Artist
- Elise Neal and D.L. Hughley - presented Favorite Latin Artist
- Shawn Mullins and Laura Innes – presented Favorite Pop/Rock Band, Duo or Group
- Donny and Marie Osmond – announced The Winners Of The Concert From The Previous Year
- Chaka Khan and Method Man – presented Favorite Alternative Artist
- Britney Spears – introduced The Goo Goo Dolls
- The Wilkinsons – presented Favorite Country Male Artist
- Jack Wagner and Steve Wariner – presented Favorite Country Female Artist
- Daisy Fuentes, Shawn Wayans and Marlon Wayans – presented Favorite Soul/R&B Male Artist
- Snoop Dogg and Bill Maher – presented Favorite Soul/R&B Female Artist
- Gerald Levert and Tia and Tamera Mowry – presented Favorite Pop/Rock Male Artist
- Enrique Iglesias – presented Favorite Pop/Rock Female Artist

== Winners and nominees ==
Subcategory	Winner	Nominees
Concert Artist of the Year
Concert Artist of the Year	Garth Brooks	Celine Dion (2nd place); Shania Twain (3rd place); Backstreet Boys (4th place); Metallica (5th place)
Pop/Rock Category
Favorite Pop/Rock Male Artist	Eric Clapton	Puff Daddy; Will Smith
Favorite Pop/Rock Female Artist	Celine Dion	Brandy; Shania Twain
Favorite Pop/Rock Band/Duo/Group	Aerosmith	Backstreet Boys; Matchbox 20
Favorite Pop/Rock Album	Big Willie Style - Will Smith	Let's Talk About Love - Celine Dion; Come On Over - Shania Twain
Favorite Pop/Rock New Artist	*NSYNC	Natalie Imbruglia; Third Eye Blind
Soul/R&B Category
Favorite Soul/R&B Male Artist	Will Smith	Mase; Brian McKnight
Favorite Soul/R&B Female Artist	Janet Jackson	Aaliyah; Brandy
Favorite Soul/R&B Band/Duo/Group	K-Ci & JoJo	Next; Xscape
Favorite Soul/R&B Album	Big Willie Style - Will Smith	Love Always - K-Ci & JoJo; Anytime - Brian McKnight
Favorite Soul/R&B New Artist	Lauryn Hill	LSG; Next
Country Category
Favorite Country Male Artist	Garth Brooks	Tim McGraw; George Strait
Favorite Country Female Artist	Shania Twain	Faith Hill; LeAnn Rimes
Favorite Country Band/Duo/Group	Alabama	Brooks & Dunn; Dixie Chicks
Favorite Country Album	Sevens - Garth Brooks	One Step at a Time - George Strait; Come On Over - Shania Twain
Favorite Country New Artist	Dixie Chicks	The Kinleys; The Wilkinsons
Adult Contemporary Category
Favorite Adult Contemporary Artist	Celine Dion	Backstreet Boys; Shania Twain
Alternative Category
Favorite Alternative Artist	Pearl Jam	Green Day; Third Eye Blind
Rap/Hip-Hop Category
Favorite Rap/Hip-Hop Artist	Master P	Beastie Boys; Puff Daddy
Latin Category
Favorite Latin Artist	Enrique Iglesias	Los Tigres del Norte; Ricky Martin
Soundtrack Category
Favorite Soundtrack	Titanic	Armageddon; City of Angels
Merit
Billy Joel
