= American Music Awards of 2015 =

Music awards ceremony

43rd Annual American Music Awards
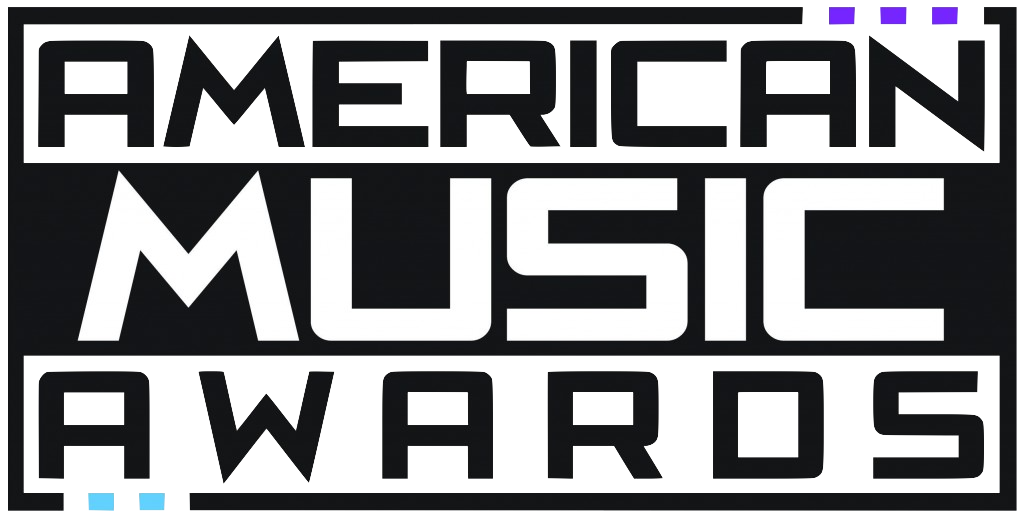
- American Music Awards logo
- Date: November 22, 2015
- Location: Microsoft Theater; Los Angeles, California
- Country: United States
- Hosted by: Jennifer Lopez
- First award: 1973

Highlights
- Most awards: Taylor Swift (3)
- Most nominations: Taylor Swift (6)
- Website: ABC-American Music Awards

Television/radio coverage
- Network: ABC; NET.
- Runtime: 180 minutes
- Viewership: 10.98 million
- Produced by: Dick Clark Productions

The 43rd Annual American Music Awards was held at the Microsoft Theater in Los Angeles, California on November 22, 2015. It was broadcast on ABC and hosted by Jennifer Lopez. With three awards Taylor Swift was the big winner of the night. Jared Leto presented a eulogy mourning the November 2015 Paris attacks prior to presenting Celine Dion for her tributing performance. The show also marked Prince's last public award show appearance before his death in April 2016. The telecast garnered 10.98 million viewers in the United States.

== Performances ==
| Artist(s) | Song(s) |
Pre-show
| Francesco Yates | "Nobody like You" "Sugar" |
| Alessia Cara | "Here" |
| Gabi Wilson | "Wonder" |
| Shawn Mendes | "Act like You Love Me" "Stitches" |
Main show
| Jennifer Lopez | "Waiting for Tonight"; Dance Medley: 1. "Uptown Funk" by Bruno Mars; 2. "Anaconda" by Nicki Minaj; 3. "7/11" by Beyonce; 4. "Feeling Myself" by Nicki Minaj ft Beyonce; 5. "The Hills" by the Weeknd; 6. "Can't Feel My Face" by The Weeknd; 7. "Girl Crush" by Little Big Town; 8. "Bad Blood" by Taylor Swift ft Kendrick Lamar; 9. "Trap Queen" by Fetty Wap; 10. "Hotline Bling" by Drake; 11. "Thinking Out Loud" by Ed Sheeran; 12. "Love More" by Chris Brown ft Nicki Minaj; 13. "Where Are Ü Now" by Jack Ü & Justin Bieber; 14. "Bitch Better Have My Money" by Rihanna |
| 5 Seconds of Summer | "Hey Everybody!" |
| Selena Gomez | "Same Old Love" |
| Carrie Underwood | "Heartbeat" |
| Demi Lovato | "Confident" |
| Meghan Trainor; Charlie Puth | "Like I'm Gonna Lose You" "Marvin Gaye" |
| Ariana Grande | "Focus" |
| One Direction | "Perfect" |
| Gwen Stefani | "Used to Love You" |
| Nick Jonas | "Chains" "Levels" "Jealous" |
| Walk the Moon | "Shut Up and Dance" |
| Coldplay | "Adventure of a Lifetime" |
| The Weeknd | "The Hills" |
| Luke Bryan; Karen Fairchild | "Home Alone Tonight" |
| Macklemore & Ryan Lewis; Leon Bridges | "Kevin" |
| Alanis Morissette; Demi Lovato | "You Oughta Know" |
| Celine Dion | Tribute to Paris victims: "Hymne à l'amour" |
| Pentatonix & Orchestra | Tribute to John Williams: "Star Wars (Main Title)" |
| Justin Bieber | "What Do You Mean?" "Where Are Ü Now" "Sorry" |

== Presenters ==
- Prince — presented Favorite Soul/R&B Album
- Hannah Davis & Wiz Khalifa — introduced 5 Seconds of Summer
- Nicki Minaj — presented Favorite Pop/Rock Band/Duo/Group
- Jenny McCarthy — introduced Carrie Underwood
- Chloë Grace Moretz & Nick Robinson — introduced Meghan Trainor & Charlie Puth
- Kelsea Ballerini & Florida Georgia Line — presented Favorite Country Male Artist
- Jennifer Lopez (host) — introduced Ariana Grande
- Tyrese Gibson & Wilmer Valderrama — presented Top Soundtrack
- Gigi Hadid & Kylie Jenner presented — Favorite Rap/Hip-Hop Album
- Zendaya — introduced One Direction
- Alicia Silverstone & Jeremy Sisto — introduced Gwen Stefani
- DNCE — introduced Nick Jonas
- Jennifer Lopez — presented New Artist of the Year
- Shawn Mendes & Hailee Steinfeld — introduced Walk the Moon
- Paula Abdul & Donnie Wahlberg — presented Favorite Pop/Rock Female Artist
- Fall Out Boy — introduced Coldplay
- Norman Reedus — presented Favorite Country Female Artist
- Ashley Benson & Tove Lo — introduced The Weeknd
- Sean Combs — presented Collaboration of the Year
- Little Big Town — introduced Luke Bryan & Karen Fairchild
- Terry Crews & Taylor Lautner — introduced Macklemore & Ryan Lewis & Leon Bridges
- Fifth Harmony — presented Favorite Alternative Artist
- Anna Kendrick — introduced Alanis Morissette & Demi Lovato
- Ellie Goulding & Julianne Hough — presented Favorite Rap/Hip-Hop Artist
- Jared Leto — paid tribute to the victims of the November 2015 Paris attacks & introduced Celine Dion
- Harrison Ford — paid tribute to John Williams & introduced Pentatonix
- Betty Cantrell & Kevin O'Leary — presented Favorite Soul/R&B Male Artist
- Jeremy Renner — presented Artist of the Year
- Ciara — introduced Justin Bieber

== Winners and nominees ==
Charlie Puth and Joe Jonas announced the nominations on October 13, 2015.

| Artist of the Year | New Artist of the Year |
|---|---|
| One Direction; Luke Bryan; Ariana Grande; Nicki Minaj; Taylor Swift | Sam Hunt; Fetty Wap; Tove Lo; Walk the Moon; The Weeknd |
| Favorite Pop/Rock Male Artist | Favorite Pop/Rock Female Artist |
| Ed Sheeran; Nick Jonas; Sam Smith | Ariana Grande; Taylor Swift; Meghan Trainor |
| Favorite Pop/Rock Band/Duo/Group | Favorite Pop/Rock Album |
| One Direction; Maroon 5; Walk the Moon | 1989 – Taylor Swift; × – Ed Sheeran; In the Lonely Hour – Sam Smith |
| Favorite Country Male Artist | Favorite Country Female Artist |
| Luke Bryan; Jason Aldean; Sam Hunt | Carrie Underwood; Kelsea Ballerini; Miranda Lambert |
| Favorite Country Duo or Group | Favorite Country Album |
| Florida Georgia Line; Little Big Town; Zac Brown Band | Anything Goes – Florida Georgia Line; Old Boots, New Dirt – Jason Aldean; Montevallo – Sam Hunt |
| Favorite Rap/Hip-Hop Artist | Favorite Rap/Hip-Hop Album |
| Nicki Minaj; Drake; Fetty Wap | The Pinkprint – Nicki Minaj; 2014 Forest Hills Drive – J. Cole; If You're Reading This It's Too Late – Drake |
| Favorite Soul/R&B Male Artist | Favorite Soul/R&B Female Artist |
| The Weeknd; Chris Brown; Trey Songz | Rihanna; Beyoncé; Mary J. Blige |
| Favorite Soul/R&B Album | Favorite Alternative Artist |
| Beauty Behind the Madness – The Weeknd; X – Chris Brown; Black Messiah – D'Angelo and The Vanguard | Fall Out Boy; Hozier; Walk the Moon |
| Favorite Adult Contemporary Artist | Favorite Latin Artist |
| Taylor Swift; Ed Sheeran; Meghan Trainor | Enrique Iglesias; Ricky Martin; Romeo Santos |
| Favorite Contemporary Inspirational Artist | Favorite EDM Artist |
| Casting Crowns; Hillsong United; MercyMe | Calvin Harris; David Guetta; Zedd |
| Song of the Year | Collaboration of the Year |
| "Blank Space" – Taylor Swift; "See You Again" – Wiz Khalifa featuring Charlie Puth; "Uptown Funk" – Mark Ronson featuring Bruno Mars; "Thinking Out Loud" – Ed Sheeran; "Can't Feel My Face" – The Weeknd | "Where Are Ü Now" – Jack Ü featuring Justin Bieber; "See You Again" – Wiz Khalifa featuring Charlie Puth; "FourFiveSeconds" – Rihanna, Kanye West and Paul McCartney; "Uptown Funk" – Mark Ronson featuring Bruno Mars; "Bad Blood" – Taylor Swift featuring Kendrick Lamar |
Top Soundtrack
Pitch Perfect 2; Fifty Shades of Grey; Empire: Original Soundtrack from Season 1
