= JPEGMafia discography =

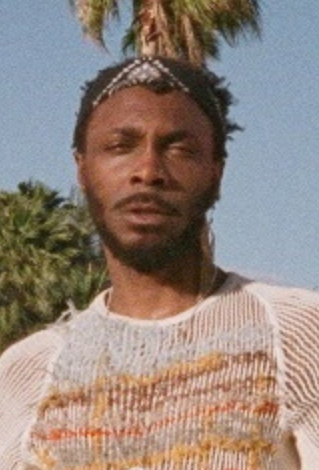
- JPEGMafia in 2021
- Studio albums: 5
- EPs: 4
- Singles: 45
- Video albums: 3
- Music videos: 39
- Mixtapes: 8
- Collaborative projects: 2
- Compilations: 3

The discography of American rapper and producer JPEGMafia consists of five studio albums, four collaborative albums, four extended plays, eight mixtapes, three video albums and 45 singles (including 12 as a featured artist).

JPEGMafia originally began his music career under the stage name Devon Hendryx, releasing five studio albums, one mixtape, one extended play and one video album.

He released his debut studio album Black Ben Carson in February 2016. A few months later, Hendricks released a collaborative extended play titled The 2nd Amendment with fellow rapper Freaky on his YouTube and Bandcamp page. His second solo studio breakthrough album Veteran was released in January 2018 to widespread critical acclaim. In September 2019, he released his third studio album All My Heroes Are Cornballs, to further acclaim. It debuted at number 105 on the Billboard 200, becoming his first entry on the chart. In 2023, he released his collaborative studio album Scaring the Hoes (2023) through AWAL. In 2024, he released his fifth studio album I Lay Down My Life for You (2024). It debuted at number 102 on the Billboard 200.

== Albums ==
=== Studio albums ===
List of studio albums, with selected chart positions
Title	Album details	Peak chart positions			
Title	Album details	US	CAN	IRE	NZ
Black Ben Carson	Released: February 15, 2016; Label: Deathbomb Arc, later Self-released; Formats: Cassette, vinyl, CD, digital download, streaming	—	—	—	—
Veteran	Released: January 19, 2018; Label: Deathbomb Arc, EQT, AWAL; Formats: Cassette, vinyl, CD, digital download, streaming	—	—	—	—
All My Heroes Are Cornballs	Released: September 13, 2019; Label: EQT; Formats: Vinyl, CD, USB stick, digital download, streaming	105	94	86	—
LP!	Released: October 22, 2021; Label: Republic, EQT; Formats: Vinyl, CD, USB stick, cassette, digital download, streaming	—	—	—	—
I Lay Down My Life for You	Released: August 1, 2024; Label: AWAL; Formats: Vinyl, CD, USB stick, cassette, digital download, streaming	102	—	—	33
Experimental Rap	Released: May 21, 2026; Label: AWAL; Formats: Vinyl, CD, USB stick, digital download, streaming	—	—	—	—

=== Collaborative projects ===
List of collaborative projects, with selected details
Title	Details	Peak chart positions				
Title	Details	US	US R&B/HH	CAN	IRE	NZ
The 2nd Amendment (with Freaky)	Released: June 18, 2016; Label: Self-released; Formats: Cassette, CD, digital download, vinyl	—	—	—	—	—
Scaring the Hoes (with Danny Brown)	Released: March 24, 2023; Label: AWAL; Formats: Cassette, vinyl, CD, USB stick, digital download, streaming	84	39	62	55	32
We Live in a Society (with Flume)	Released: May 2, 2025; Label: Self-released; Formats: Vinyl, digital download, streaming	—	—	—	—	—

=== Mixtapes ===
List of mixtapes, with selected details
Title	Album details
Dreamcast Summer Songs (as Dévon Hendryx)	Released: August 26, 2009; Formats: Digital download, Cassette, CD, vinyl, streaming
Generation Y (as Devon Hendryx)	Released: January 16, 2011; Formats: Digital download, Cassette, vinyl, streaming
JoeChillWorld (as Devon Hendryx a/k/a "The Rockwood Escape Plan")	Released: July 10, 2011; Formats: Digital download, Cassette, CD, vinyl, streaming
L.I.S.A. (as Devon Hendryx, with DatPiffMafia as "Enso Sinatra")	Released: October 8, 2011; Formats: Digital download
The Rockwood Escape Plan (as Devon Hendryx a/k/a "The Rockwood Escape Plan")	Released: February 14, 2012; Formats: Digital download, Cassette, CD, vinyl, streaming
The Ghost~Pop Tape (as Devon Hendryx)	Released: October 22, 2013 (re-released October 23, 2023); Formats: Cassette, digital download, CD, vinyl, streaming, USB stick
Communist Slow Jams	Released: April 6, 2015; Formats: Cassette, digital download
Darkskin Manson	Released: May 15, 2015; Formats: Cassette, digital download

=== Compilations ===
List of compilations, with selected details
Title	Album details
Not on Veteran!	Released: June 6, 2017; Formats: Streaming
Freestyles	Released: February 23, 2022; Formats: Streaming
Hi-Fi. (as Devon Hendryx)	Released: August 1, 2026; Formats: Streaming

=== Visual albums ===
List of visual albums, with selected details
Title	Album details
The Ghost~Pop Tape	Released: August 12, 2013; Formats: DVD, digital
Darkskin Manson	Released: May 15, 2015; Formats: DVD, digital
Scaring the Hoes: DLC Pack (with Danny Brown)	Released: July 11, 2023; Formats: Digital

=== Extended plays ===
List of extended plays, with selected details
Title	EP details
❤ (Heart Emoji) (as Devon Hendryx)	Released: September 21, 2012; Formats: Digital download, streaming
Darkskin Manson EP	Released: May 15, 2015; Formats: Digital download
The 2nd Amendment (with Freaky)	Released: June 18, 2016; Formats: Cassette, CD, digital download
EP!	Released: November 6, 2020; Formats: Digital download, Streaming
EP2!	Released: February 12, 2021; Label: Republic Records; Format: Digital download, streaming
Scaring the Hoes: DLC Pack (with Danny Brown)	Released: July 11, 2023; Label: Peggy; Formats: Digital download, vinyl, streaming
We Live in a Society (with Flume)	Released: May 2, 2025; Formats: Digital download, vinyl, streaming

== Singles ==
=== As lead artist ===
List of singles as lead artist showing year released and album name
Title	Year	Album(s)
"Call Me Maybe"	2013	The Ghost~Pop Tape
"You Think You Know"	2016	Black Ben Carson
"I Smell Crack"	2016	Black Ben Carson
"Digital Blackface"	2016	Black Ben Carson
"I Might Vote 4 Donald Trump" (with Freaky)	2016	The 2nd Amendment
"Man Purse"	2017	Not on Veteran!
"This Song is a Safe Space" (with Freaky and Black Sheep Refugees)	2017	Not on Veteran!
"Starrcade 97" (with DatPiffMafia as Enso Sinatra)	2017	Not on Veteran!
"Baby I'm Bleeding"	2017	Veteran
"Does This Ski Mask Make Me Look Fat?" (with Heno.)	2018	Not on Veteran!
"Millennium Freestyle"	2018	Not on Veteran!
"Puff Daddy" (with Kenny Beats)	2018	Not on Veteran!
"The Who" (with Eyas)	2019	Non-album single
"Jesus Forgive Me, I Am a Thot"	2019	All My Heroes Are Cornballs
"Beta Male Strategies"	2019	All My Heroes Are Cornballs
"Bald!" (solo or remix featuring Denzel Curry)	2020	EP! and LP!
"Covered in Money!"	2020	EP!
"Bodyguard!"	2020	EP!
"Cutie Pie!"	2020	EP! and LP!
"The Bends!"	2020	EP!
"Rough 7" (with Tommy Genesis)	2020	EP!
"Living Single"	2020	EP!
"Last Dance!"	2020	EP2!
"Fix Urself!"	2021	EP2!
"Trust!"	2021	LP!
"Hazard Duty Pay!"	2021	LP!
"Lean Beef Patty" (with Danny Brown)	2023	Scaring the Hoes
"Scaring the Hoes" (with Danny Brown)	2023	Scaring the Hoes
"Don't Rely on Other Men" (with Freaky)	2024	I Lay Down My Life for You
"Sin Miedo"	2024	I Lay Down My Life for You
"Protect the Cross"	2025	I Lay Down My Life for You (Directors Cut)
"Valentine's Day Freestyle '25"	2025	Non-album single
"Track 1" (with Flume)	2025	We Live in a Society
"Is It Real?" (with Flume featuring Ravyn Lenae)	2025	We Live in a Society
"Manic!"	2025	Scaring The Hoes (Directors Cut)
"Babygirl"	2026	Experimental Rap
"War Over Land"	2026	Experimental Rap

=== As featured artist ===
List of singles as featured artist, showing year and album name
Title	Year	Album(s)
"Vengeance" (Denzel Curry featuring JPEGMafia and ZillaKami)	2018	Ta13oo
"Hate You" (Health featuring JPEGMafia)	2019	Disco4 :: Part I
"Black Moses" (Channel Tres featuring JPEGMafia)	2019	Black Moses
"Awake" (Tkay Maidza featuring JPEGMafia)	2019	Last Year Was Weird (Vol. 2)
"HPNGC" (Injury Reserve featuring JPEGMafia and Code Orange)	2019	Non-album single
"Nauseous / Devilish" (Vegyn featuring JPEGMafia)	2019	Only Diamonds Cut Diamonds
"Chain On / Hold Me" (Brockhampton featuring JPEGMafia)	2020	Non-album single
"High Beams" (JPEGMafia Remix) (Tkay Maidza featuring JPEGMafia)	2022	Non-album single
"Dirt" (Y2K featuring JPEGMafia)	2022	Non-album single
"Black Enuff" (Redveil featuring JPEGMafia)	2023	Playing w/ Fire
"Junebug" (Raveena featuring JPEGMafia)	2024	Where the Butterflies Go in the Rain
"Wassup" (Joey Valence & Brae featuring JPEGMafia)	2025	Hyperyouth
"Fake Jeezy" (Maxo Kream featuring JPEGMafia and Denzel Curry)	2026	Non-album single

== Other charted songs ==
List of other charted songs, with year released and album name shown
Title	Year	Peak chart positions	Album
Title	Year	NZ Hot	Album
"Steppa Pig" (with Danny Brown)	2023	40	Scaring the Hoes
"Burfict!" (with Danny Brown)	2023	34	Scaring the Hoes
"Either On or Off the Drugs"	2024	39	I Lay Down My Life for You

== Guest appearances ==
List of non-single guest appearances, with other performing artists, showing year released and album name
Title	Year	Other artist(s)	Album(s)
"Anti-Chips"	2016	Abdu Ali, Elon	Mongo
"Face (JPEGMafia Remix)"	2018	Clipping	Face
"How to Build a Relationship"	2019	Flume	Hi This Is Flume
"Peggylude"	2019	Abdu Ali	FIYAH!!!
"Peggylude II"	2019	Abdu Ali	FIYAH!!!
"GTFU"	2019	Injury Reserve, Cakes da Killa	Injury Reserve
"Simon Phoenix"	2019	Ho99o9	Cyber Warfare
"Negro Spiritual"	2019	Danny Brown	uknowhatimsayin¿
"Nauseous / Devilish"	2019	Vegyn	Only Diamonds Cut Diamonds
"Hate You"	2020	Health	Disco4
"MLS"	2020	Gorillaz, Chai	Song Machine, Season One: Strange Timez
"Potato"	2020	Freaky	Red Hot Cheeto Fingers 2
"Chain On"	2021	Brockhampton	Roadrunner: New Light, New Machine
"Still"	2022	Kenny Beats, Omar Apollo	Louie
"Yoo"	2024	PlayThatBoiZay	Vampires Impersonating People
"NOLA"	2025	Kevin Abstract, Truly Young, Love Spells, Diego, Drigo, and Quadeca	Blush
"Trinidad"	2025	Geese	Getting Killed
"Fake Jeezy"	2026	Maxo Kream, Denzel Curry	O.Y.N
"OK OK" (Hamdi Remix)	2026	Fred Again, Beam, Danny Brown, and Parisi	USB002 Remixes
"Evil Grin"	2026	Denzel Curry	II

== Music videos ==
=== As lead artist ===
List of music videos, with directors, showing year released
Title	Year	Director(s)
"Stoop"	2015	JPEGMafia
"Mothers Milk"	2015	JPEGMafia
"Polly"	2015	Eric Aponche Gonzales
"You Think You Know Me"	2015	VisualQue
"I Smell Crack"	2016	JPEGMafia
"Digital Blackface"	2016	EyeOfMyra
"I Might Vote 4 Donald Trump" (with Freaky)	2016	Jeff Rettberg
"Bumbopussyrasclat"	2016	RefinedSugar
"Kid Rock Freestyle 2014"	2016	Young Emoji
"Starrcade 97" (with Enso)	2017	JPEGMafia
"Man Purse"	2017	Andrew McGlennon
"Baby I'm Bleeding"	2017	Audrey Gatewood
"Real Nega"	2018	Audrey Gatewood
"1539 N. Calvert"	2018	Audrey Gatewood
"Puff Daddy" (with Kenny Beats)	2019	Maxwell Nalevansky
"Jesus Forgive Me, I Am a Thot"	2019	Andrew McGlennon
"Free the Frail" (featuring Helena Deland)	2019	Andrew McGlennon
"Bald!"	2020	JPEGMafia
"Covered in Money!"	2020	JPEGMafia
"Bodyguard!"	2020	JPEGMafia
"Bald!" (Remix) (with Denzel Curry)	2020	JPEGMafia
"Cutie Pie!"	2020	JPEGMafia
"The Bends!"	2020	JPEGMafia
"Rough 7!" (with Tommy Genesis)	2020	JPEGMafia
"Living Single!"	2020	JPEGMafia
"Last Dance!"	2020	JPEGMafia
"Fix Yourself!"	2021	Anthony Sylvester
"Trust!"	2021	JPEGMafia
"Hazard Duty Pay!"	2021	JPEGMafia & Anthony Sylvester
"Dirty!"	2021	JPEGMafia & Anthony Sylvester
"Lean Beef Patty" (with Danny Brown)	2023	JPEGMafia & Anthony Sylvester
"Scaring the Hoes" (with Danny Brown)	2023	Logan Fields & JPEGMafia
"Scaring the Hoes: DLC Pack" (Note: "Scaring the Hoes: DLC Pack" is a music video composed of the tracks "Guess What Bitch, We Back Hoe!," "Hermanos," "Tell Me Where To Go," and "No! No! No! No! No! No! No! No! No! No! No! No! No! No! No! No! No! No! No! No! No! No! No! No! No! No! No! No! No! No! No! No!" from their EP, Scaring the Hoes: DLC Pack) (with Danny Brown)	2023	Logan Fields & JPEGMafia
"Don't Rely on Other Men" (with Freaky)	2024	Logan Fields & JPEGMafia
"Sin Miedo"	2024	Logan Fields & JPEGMafia
"Jpegultra!" (with Denzel Curry)	2024	Denzel Curry
"Protect the Cross"	2025	Logan Fields & JPEGMafia
"Cult Status"	2025	Logan Fields & JPEGMafia

=== As featured artist ===
List of music videos, with directors, showing year released
Title	Year	Director(s)
"Vengeance" (Denzel Curry featuring JPEGMafia and ZillaKami)	2018	Zev Deans
"Awake" (Tkay Maidza featuring JPEGMafia)	2019	—N/a
"Nauseous / Devilish" (Vegyn featuring JPEGMafia)	2019	Joshua Gordon
"High Beams" (JPEGMafia Remix) (Tkay Maidza featuring JPEGMafia)	2022	—N/a
"Fake Jeezy" (Maxo Kream featuring JPEGMafia and Denzel Curry)	2026	Oakmobb and Jack Rottier

== Production credits ==
List of songs produced, co-produced and remixed for other artists by year, album and title
Title	Year	Artist	Album(s)	Credit(s)
"I Love You"	2012	Lil B	God's Father	Production
"I'm Alive (Humanized)"	2016	Abdu Ali	Mongo	Production
"Anti-Chips"	2016	Abdu Ali	Mongo	Production
"Dookie"	2017	Freaky	Red Hot Cheeto Fingers	Production
"Barbarians"	2017	Armand Hammer	Rome	Production
"Face" (JPEGMafia Remix)	2017	Clipping.	Face	Remixer
"Hate You"	2019	Health	—N/a	Producer
"How to Build a Relationship"	2019	Flume	Hi This Is Flume	Producer
"3 Tearz"	2019	Danny Brown	uknowhatimsayin¿	Producer
"Hello Freestyle (Pt. 4)"	2020	IDK	—N/a	Producer
"John Wayne"	2022	Denzel Curry	Melt My Eyez See Your Future	Producer
"Landlines"	2023	Armand Hammer	We Buy Diabetic Test Strips	Producer
"Woke Up and Asked Siri How I'm Gonna Die"	2023	Armand Hammer	We Buy Diabetic Test Strips	Producer
"When It Doesn't Start with a Kiss"	2023	Armand Hammer	We Buy Diabetic Test Strips	Producer
"The Key Is Under the Mat"	2023	Armand Hammer	We Buy Diabetic Test Strips	Producer
"Stars"	2024	¥$ (Kanye West and Ty Dolla Sign)	Vultures 1	Producer
"Fuk Sumn"	2024	¥$ (Kanye West and Ty Dolla Sign)	Vultures 1	Producer
"Beg Forgiveness"	2024	¥$ (Kanye West and Ty Dolla Sign)	Vultures 1	Producer
"King"	2024	¥$ (Kanye West and Ty Dolla Sign)	Vultures 1	Producer
"Believer"	2024	¥$ (Kanye West and Ty Dolla Sign)	Vultures 2 (Digital Deluxe)	Producer
"Fake Jeezy" (feat. Denzel Curry)	2026	Maxo Kream	O.Y.N	Producer
"6 Months Clean"	2026	Maxo Kream	O.Y.N	Producer
"O.Y.N"	2026	Maxo Kream	O.Y.N	Producer
"30 N Dirty"	2026	Maxo Kream	O.Y.N	Producer
"This Shit Going On"	2026	Maxo Kream	O.Y.N	Producer
"Time Out"	2026	Maxo Kream	O.Y.N	Producer
"Cum Over" (feat. Isaiah Falls)	2026	Maxo Kream	O.Y.N	Producer
"How I'm Coming"	2026	Maxo Kream	O.Y.N	Producer
"How TF I'm Lucky"	2026	Maxo Kream	O.Y.N	Producer
