= HBK (disambiguation) =

The term HBK most often is used as an abbreviation for the Heartbreak Kid, a nickname of American professional wrestler Shawn Michaels.

HBK may also refer to:

== Football clubs ==
- Halmstads BK, based in Halmstad, Sweden
- HB Køge, based in Herfølge, Køge Municipality, Denmark
- Höganäs BK, based in Höganäs, Sweden
- Hønefoss BK, based in Hønefoss, Norway

== Other uses ==
- HBK Investments, an American investment management company
- Croatian Bishops' Conference (Croatian: Hrvatska biskupska konferencija), an episcopal conference of the Catholic Church in Croatia
- Hardback book (Hbk)
- Hochschule für Bildende Künste Braunschweig, a fine arts college in Braunschweig, Germany
- Holbrook Municipal Airport, in Arizona, United States
- Humse Badhkar Kaun, a 1998 Bollywood film
- Carl Hagelin - Nick Bonino - Phil Kessel line for the NHL’s Pittsburgh Penguins during the 2016 Stanley Cup playoffs
- "HBK", a song by JPEGMAFIA from his 2013 album The Ghost~Pop Tape
- "HBK", a song by Nardo Wick featuring 21 Savage from his 2025 album WICK
- The HBK Gang, American hip hop and music production collective
