= I Lay Down My Life for You =

2024 studio album by JPEGMafia

Studio album by JPEGMafia
- Released: August 1, 2024
- Genres: Experimental hip-hop; industrial hip-hop; rap rock
- Length: 41:24 (standard); 74:26 (Director's Cut)
- Label: AWAL
- Producers: JPEGMafia; DJ RaMeMes (O Destruidor do Funk); Flume; Kenny Beats; Nick Lee; Aver Ray; Alex Goldblatt

JPEGMafia chronology
Scaring the Hoes (2023)	I Lay Down My Life for You (2024)	We Live in a Society (2025)
- Director's Cut cover

Singles from I Lay Down My Life for You
- 1. "Don't Rely On Other Men" Released: June 17, 2024; 2. "Sin Miedo" Released: July 15, 2024; 3. "Protect the Cross" Released: January 20, 2025

I Lay Down My Life for You (stylized in all caps) is the fifth studio album by American rapper and record producer JPEGMafia. It was released on August 1, 2024, through AWAL. The album features guest appearances from Vince Staples, Denzel Curry, and Buzzy Lee, with additional contributions from frequent collaborator FreakyMafiaCult. A deluxe version, the Director's Cut, was released on February 3, 2025, adding fourteen additional tracks.

An experimental hip-hop, industrial hip-hop, and rap rock album, I Lay Down My Life for You sonically blends various genres including boom bap, electronic, jazz, metal, and punk. JPEGMafia produced the album himself, with featured producers including Flume and Kenny Beats on several tracks. Themed on capitalism, conscription, the war on drugs, patriotism, and politics, the album uses JPEGMafia's cockiness and eclectic sampling. It later progresses towards introspective themes by the last third of the album, focusing on his career, depression and past struggles.

To promote I Lay Down My Life for You, JPEGMafia released the singles "Don't Rely On Other Men" and "Sin Miedo" with their accompanying music videos, a visual trailer, and a music video for "JPEGUltra!" (with Denzel Curry). He headlined the Lay Down My Life Tour from August 2024 to March 2025, with Jane Remover as an opening act on the North American leg of the tour. Following JPEGMafia's main tour, he served as one of the supporting acts for Linkin Park on their From Zero World Tour from June to September 2025. In addition to the initial promotion, JPEGMafia released the single "Protect the Cross" to promote the Director's Cut version.

I Lay Down My Life for You received generally positive reviews from music critics for its production, sampling, and overall narrative. Despite the overall praise, some critics challenged JPEGMafia's lyricism on the album. The album was featured in year-end lists for the best albums of 2024, ranking at number two on The Guardian's and number three on Time's. Commercially, the album charted on the US Billboard 200, Top R&B/Hip-Hop Albums, and Independent Albums charts, with it peaking at number fifteen on the latter chart. I Lay Down My Life for You appeared on four UK charts: the Independent Albums, Physical Albums, R&B Albums, and Record Store Albums charts.

== Background ==
On October 22, 2021, JPEGMafia released his fourth studio album, LP!, on streaming services as an "online" version and on Bandcamp and YouTube as an "offline" version. The album received critical acclaim for its unconventional production and JPEGMafia's confrontational style. Compared to All My Heroes Are Cornballs (2019), LP! was meticulously edited and drew influences from pop music and personal stress. To promote the album, JPEGMafia went on a concert tour from October 2021 to April 2022, and its "offline" version was later made available on streaming services. LP! was considered to be JPEGMafia's final album with Republic Records.

On March 24, 2023, JPEGMafia released a collaborative album with Danny Brown titled Scaring the Hoes, which also received acclaim from music critics for its unconventional yet catchy production and both artists' chemistry. To promote the album, the two went on a concert tour in July and August. Following Scaring the Hoes, JPEGMafia began teasing his next solo studio album. On January 1, 2024, he announced that a fifth studio album was still in production after missing his goal to release an album in 2023. On April 4, 2024, he posted on Twitter that his next solo studio album would be coming "very soon". Between Scaring the Hoes and I Lay Down My Life for You, JPEGMafia collaborated with Redveil on "Black Enuff" (2023) and Raveena on "Junebug" (2024), and produced for Armand Hammer on We Buy Diabetic Test Strips (2023) and ¥$ (Kanye West and Ty Dolla Sign) on Vultures 1 (2024).

== Production and composition ==
=== Overview ===
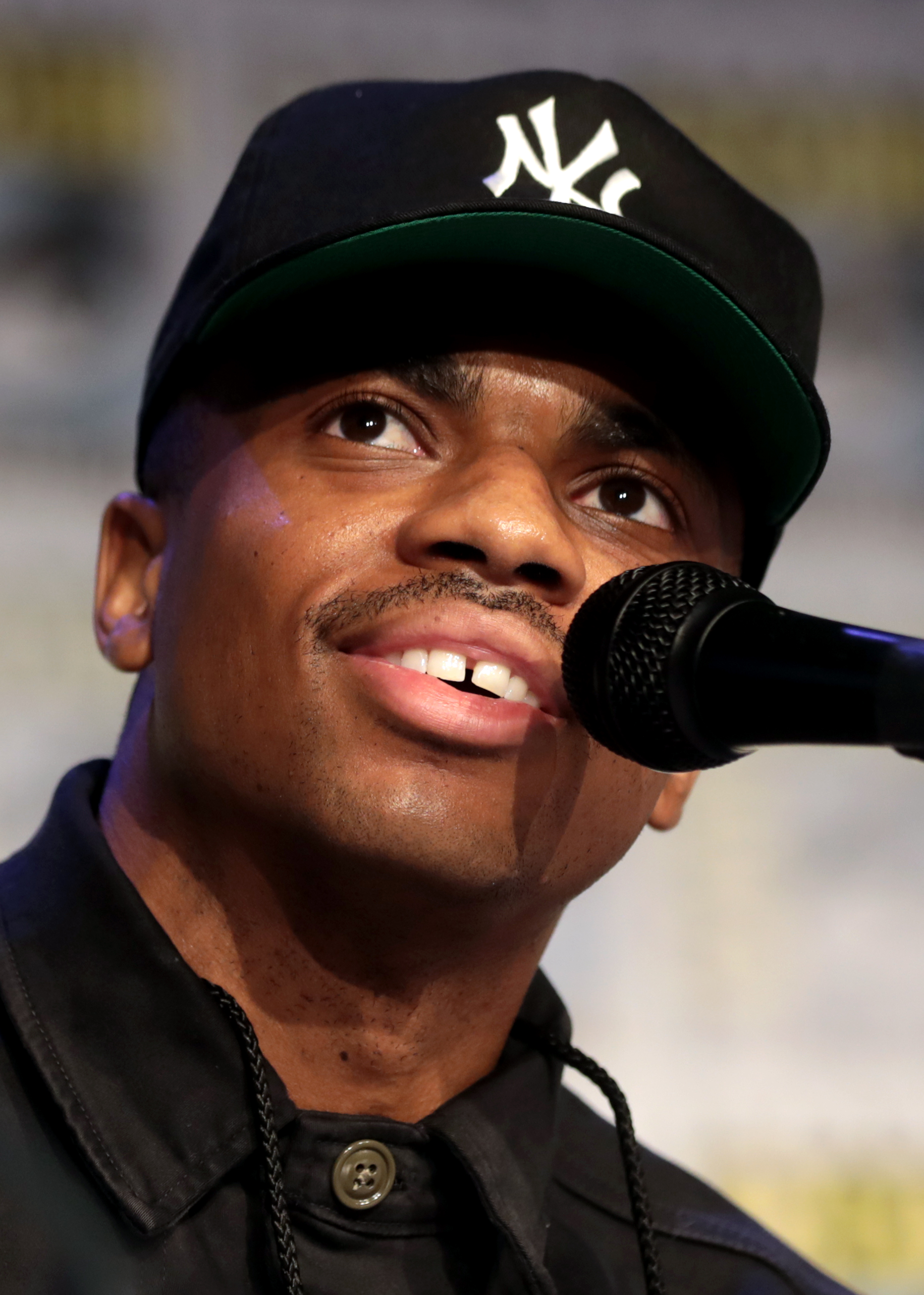
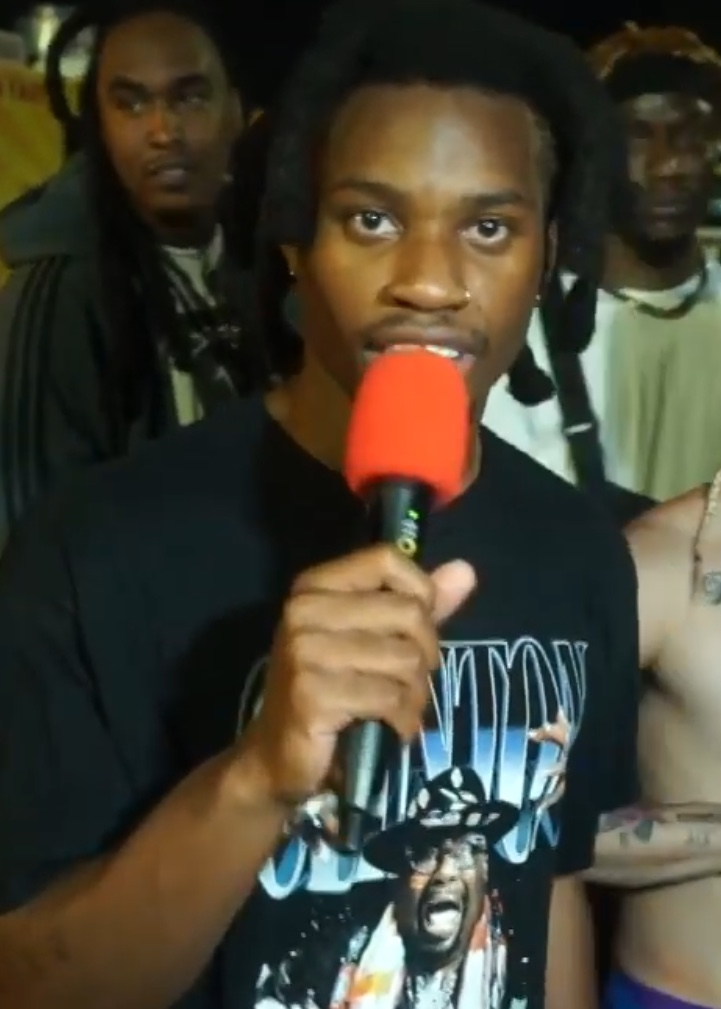
I Lay Down My Life for You features guest appearances from rappers Vince Staples and Denzel Curry on the tracks "New Black History" and "JPEGUltra!", respectively.

I Lay Down My Life for You is an experimental hip-hop, industrial hip-hop, and rap rock album with elements of boom bap, electronic, jazz, metal, and punk. The album contains fourteen tracks in a running time of forty-one minutes and twenty-four seconds. Marking JPEGMafia's first solo album since leaving Republic Records, the project features guest appearances from Vince Staples, Denzel Curry, and Buzzy Lee, and is generally themed on capitalism, conscription, the war on drugs, patriotism, and politics. JPEGMafia produced the project himself, with featured producers including Flume and Kenny Beats on several tracks. The album's title references JPEGMafia's prior military service in the United States Air Force.

I Lay Down My Life for You uses experimental production similar to JPEGMafia's previous projects, but emphasizes "metal guitar riffs", fast bloghouse beats, and older hip-hop samples. Andrew Sacher of BrooklynVegan described its production as spanning 1960s psychedelic pop, RZA-inspired beats, Daft Punk-style electronics, and futuristic soundscapes. The album contains experimental use of sampling, where some tracks use a chopped sample to serve as a central part of the production, while others use an electric guitar solo in the second half. Only a few tracks use a typical looping beat.

NPR writer Shelden Pearce described I Lay Down My Life for You as resembling a sonic collage, which includes Logan Roy's dialogue, NBA footage, 1970s Japanese jazz, contemporary baile funk, and repurposed soul drums reminiscent of Sly and the Family Stone. On the last part of the album, I Lay Down My Life for You leans into introspection, where JPEGMafia tones down his performance and raps tenderly about his career, depression, and past struggles. In addition, the production draws more heavily from classical and folk music.

=== Tracks 1–6 ===
"I'll Be Right There"
"I'll Be Right There" pitches a sample of Jade's "Don't Walk Away" (1992) reminiscent of a "sinister gospel choir".

On the album's opening track, "I Scream This in the Mirror Before I Interact with Anyone", JPEGMafia compares himself to NBA player Dillon Brooks, who is known for agitating his opponents. The track transitions from an abrasive electronic style into a metal riff. The following track, "Sin Miedo", features a beat built around a vocal sample of 2 Live Crew's "Hoochie Mama" (1994). Sonically, the track blends dance, electronic, hip-hop, and metal elements. "I'll Be Right There" alters a sample of "Don't Walk Away" (1992) by R&B girl group Jade, warping it into pitched-up harmonies reminiscent of a "sinister gospel choir" as it is set against "steady percussion and shimmering strings".

"It's Dark and Hell is Hot" is built around a prominent sample of "Upa Upa Pocoto x 170Bpm" (2023) by DJ RaMeMes (O Destruidor do Funk). Lyrically, JPEGMafia raps aggressive, fast-paced verses based on online hostility and hypocrisy, repurposing social media discourse into personal insults. In the chorus, he explores themes of religious conflict and personal faith, as he pleads to God despite lacking faithfulness. "New Black History" integrates a sample of Future's "Covered N Money" (2014) alongside a "persistent whirring sound" and synths. The track features a guest appearance from Vince Staples, whose "cold-blooded and low-key" verse was described by Hamza Ali Khan of The AU Review as combining themes of violence with exceptional rapping skill. Lyrically, JPEGMafia uses his verse to target Drake by calling him a "PDF" and "raper". "Don't Rely On Other Men" blends boom bap, noise music, and industrial metal around a Succession dialogue sample. Lyrically, JPEGMafia critiques perceived inauthenticity in contemporary hip-hop.

=== Tracks 7–14 ===
On "Vulgar Display of Power", JPEGMafia uses chants and growled vocals backed by a blistering rock instrumental. Lyrically, the track addresses mental clarity and substance use while its chorus interpolates "Bring the Pain" (1994) by Method Man. "Exmilitary" adopts an autobiographical tone with a soulful Wendy Rene sample. Drawing inspiration from JPEGMafia's military background, he raps from the perspective of a veteran who uses self-destructive violence as his only style of confrontation. Structurally, the sample builds alongside a string arrangement and occasional "manic outbursts".

"Either On or Off the Drugs"
"Either On or Off the Drugs" is based on a sample of a 1970s soul-esque AI cover of Future's song "Turn On the Lights" (2012).

"Jihad Joe" marks a sonic shift from breakbeat style to metal instrumentation. "JPEGUltra!", a collaboration with Denzel Curry, is a horn-driven track built around a jazz-funk sample. Curry uses composed arrogance in his verse while JPEGMafia displays confidence. The latter's verse explores themes of religious devotion while turning it into self-glorification through the imagery of running a cult. "Either On or Off the Drugs" utilizes a 1970s soul-style, AI-generated version of Future's "Turn on the Lights" (2012). The track centers on JPEGMafia's vulnerability based on his depression, stresses, and feelings.

"Loop It and Leave It" emphasizes a glittery, string-heavy instrumental. "Don't Put Anything On the Bible", featuring Buzzy Lee, is a chamber folk-style track that evolves into guitar riffs. Following its transition into a "calming rap beat", JPEGMafia opens about his repressed personal struggles. He does not appear until the final third of the song. "I Recovered from This", a psychedelic track, sonically features acoustic guitar, "haunting vocal harmonies", and strings. The song interpolates the line "Funny how time flies when you're having fun", with JPEGMafia reflecting on his mental health and self-healing.

=== Director's Cut ===
The Director's Cut version of I Lay Down My Life for You reshapes its track list by introducing new tracks alongside an intro and outro. On "Protect the Cross", JPEGMafia lyrically targets American voters, Drake, Freddie Gibbs, Eminem, and white underground rappers. "Jordan Rules" references JPEGMafia's comparison to Dillon Brooks from "I Scream This in the Mirror Before I Interact with Anyone".

The self-titled track "I Lay Down My Life for You" centers on JPEGMafia's failed romantic affairs while seeking to end the cycle. A pop-leaning track, "Boy You Should Know!", showcases his smooth vocals through a beat with "very jumpy female vocal chops". "Allah" closes the album's Side A section with JPEGMafia's reflection on spirituality over mellow production.

Side B opens with "What the Hip-Hop Hell is This?", referencing JPEGMafia's track "What Kinda Rappin' is This?" (2021). "Come & Get Me" is a guitar-and-string driven track with "smooth melodic vocal lines". "Bloodline Freestyle" is a demo track recorded in 2022. "Hate", which features FreakyMafiaCult, is described as sounding similar to rage music. "Take An" is a short breakbeat-based instrumental containing samples of The Notorious B.I.G.

== Promotion and release ==
On June 17, 2024, JPEGMafia released "Don't Rely On Other Men" to streaming services, as the lead single for I Lay Down My Life for You. A music video for the single was released the same day, which resembles dystopian horror. The music video stars model Brooks Ginnan as a "lonely misfit gamer captivated by Peggy's cult of personality". On July 15, JPEGMafia released "Sin Miedo" as the album's second single to streaming services along with an accompanying music video. With glitchy effects, the music video features him driving around while sporting a cowboy hat and performing under a highway overpass.

On July 29, following the release of two singles, JPEGMafia announced the album with a visual trailer, which was revealed to be titled I Lay Down My Life for You. Directed by Logan Fields, it is shot in slow motion with a "Wicker Man folk-horror vibe" and stars JPEGMafia and Brooks Ginnan, with the latter resembling a cult leader. On August 1, I Lay Down My Life for You was released through AWAL. On August 12, JPEGMafia released the music video for "JPEGUltra!", which also features Denzel Curry. Filmed on the street with handheld cameras, Curry raps his verse in three different settings as various clips overlap in the frame simultaneously. Experimenting with different aesthetics, the music video uses VHS grain, black-and-white film stock, and footage shot through a fisheye lens. The music video was directed by Curry himself and shot by three different people.

=== Director's Cut ===
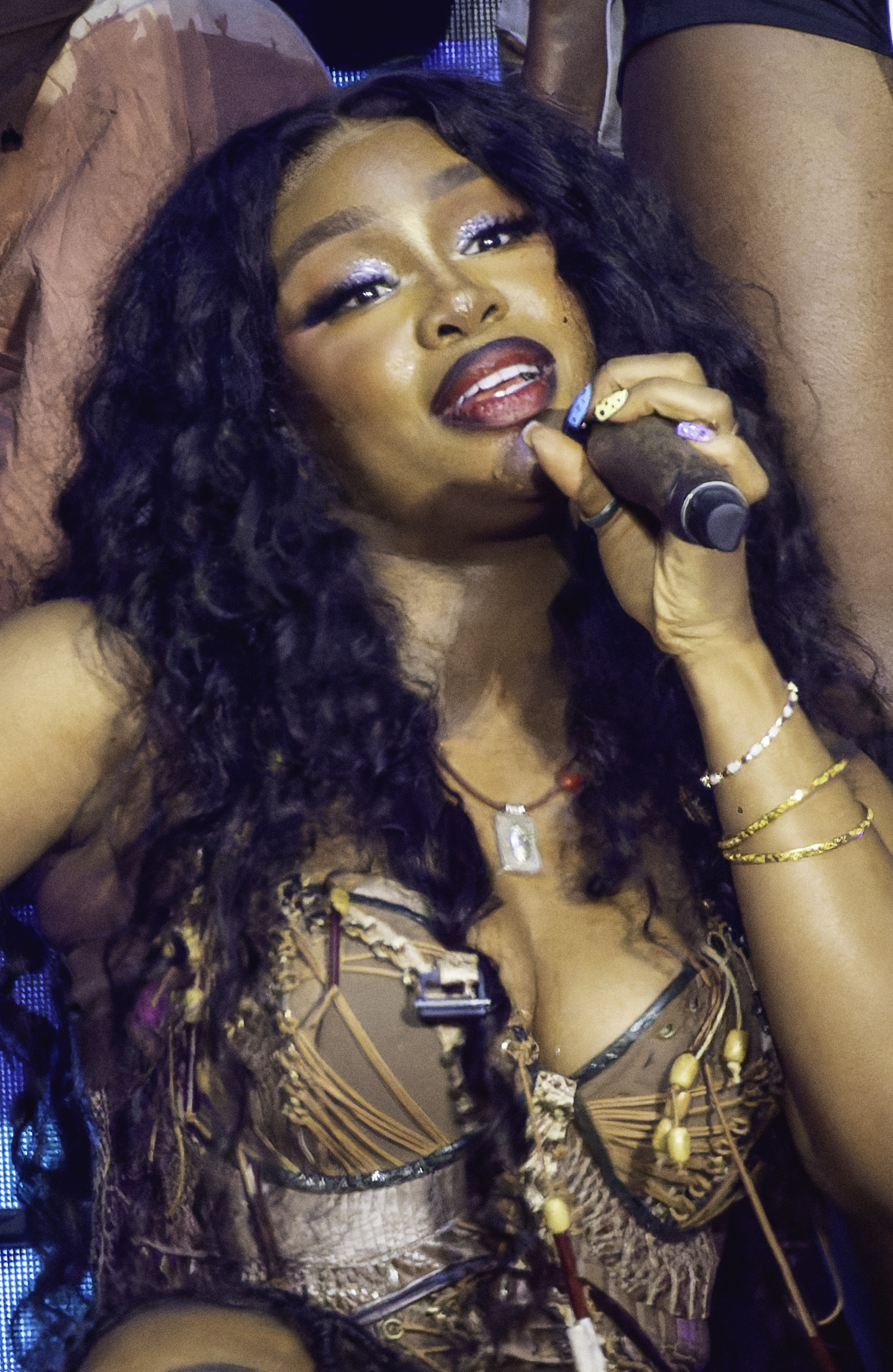
JPEGMafia's Director's Cut concept of the album was inspired by SZA's approach on Lana (2024).

On January 20, 2025, JPEGMafia announced a deluxe version of I Lay Down My Life for You, under the title Director's Cut. On the same day, he released the single "Protect the Cross" with an accompanying music video directed by Logan Fields. On February 3, JPEGMafia released the Director's Cut version of I Lay Down My Life for You, with fourteen additional tracks. At its release, he revealed that he learned about trimming out filler from an album after his experience of working with Kanye West on Vultures 1.

During an interview with Billboard in June 2025, JPEGMafia revealed that he developed the idea of the album's deluxe version after he found a similar title in the film Justice League (2017). He described his involvement in producing and mixing his albums as a director's approach, and added that he was inspired by SZA's Lana (2024), the deluxe version of SOS (2022).

According to Tyler Kelly of The Line of Best Fit, the Director's Cut version is conceptualized as a two-disc album. The first disc delves deeper into JPEGMafia's artistic perspective from the album's period. The second disc features bonus tracks that match the album's music sonically. The first disc includes a Bob Marley-credited intro and seven additional tracks, including one featuring Buzzy Lee. The second disc includes two more additional tracks recorded by JPEGMafia, a song by FreakyMafiaCult, a freestyle demo recorded in 2022, an instrumental, and the single version of "Don't Rely On Other Men".

=== Tour ===
On June 12, 2024, JPEGMafia announced the North American leg of the Lay Down My Life Tour, and subsequently announced the European/Oceanic leg of the tour on July 4. The North American leg began on August 7, in Pomona and concluded on September 21, in Chicago, with Jane Remover as the opening act. The tour's European leg began on January 30, 2025, in Dublin and concluded on March 8, in Fremantle. Following the tour, JPEGMafia was listed as one of the opening acts for Linkin Park's From Zero World Tour (2024–26), alongside AFI, the Architects, Grandson, Jean Dawson, Pvris, and Spiritbox. JPEGMafia appeared on nine dates from June to September 2025.

== Critical reception ==
Professional ratings
Aggregate scores
Source	Rating
Metacritic	78/100
Review scores
Source	Rating
AllMusic	4/5 stars
The AU Review	4/5 stars
Clash	8/10
The Guardian	4/5 stars
Tom Hull	B+
Kerrang!	4/5 stars
The Line of Best Fit	7/10
The Needle Drop	8/10 (Note: Specifically, Fantano rated the album a "strong 8".)
Pitchfork	6.9/10
Sputnikmusic	4.0/5

According to the review aggregator Metacritic, I Lay Down My Life for You received "generally favorable reviews" based on a weighted average score of 78 out of 100 from 8 critic scores. Robin Murray of Clash described the album as "earnest and surreal, confusing and pristine", complimenting JPEGMafia's diverse production and punk-like defiance. Mischa Pearlman of Kerrang! considered I Lay Down My Life for You to be a "stunning, expansive collection of songs". AllMusic's Paul Simpson wrote that while the album's confrontation can be overwhelming, he compliments its production as exceptional and that his "sheer creativity is unparalleled", pairing the album with LP! as JPEGMafia's most accessible work at its release.

Hip Hop Golden Age praised I Lay Down My Life for You as being JPEGMafia's most versatile work that blends genres and emotions, recommending it to experimental music fans as a "thrilling, unpredictable ride." Anthony Fantano of The Needle Drop saw the project as proving JPEGMafia's consistent creativity and honesty while also experimenting with his sound. Andrew Sacher of BrooklynVegan included I Lay Down My Life for You as one of the seven best rap albums of August 2024, stating it was worth the wait since LP!. He considered the album to be one of the most surprising projects JPEGMafia released.

Hamza Ali Khan of The AU Review gave insight into most of the album's tracks and praised JPEGMafia's more introspective, personal work with its emphasis on emotions rather than music. A Sputnikmusic writer considered the album to be "brilliant for the ways in which it's not", being a well-realized statement that retains its eclecticism, sense of humor, and sample-based approach. NPR's Sheldon Pearce compared JPEGMafia's approach on I Lay Down My Life for You to Kanye West's older work, with its maximalist sound being more "integrated and harmonious."

Kitty Empire of The Guardian wrote that the "rapper-producer's polemical, lane swerving bent lasts all the way to the end", eventually moving to a calmer, more reflective tone that she considered to expand JPEGMafia's range. Matthew Ritchie of Pitchfork complimented many tracks on I Lay Down My Life for You, although he described the album as trying to manage numerous musical styles. Though The Line of Best Fit writer Matthew Kim praised the album's production and JPEGMafia's introspective tracks, he felt the album was underwhelming and full of lyrical clichés, describing the rapper's approach as "running at cruise control".

Year-end list rankings

Year‑end lists
Publication	List	Rank	Ref.
AllMusic	Best Albums of 2024	Unranked	
Clash	Albums of the Year 2024	54	
The Guardian	10 Best Albums of 2024	2	
The Needle Drop	Top 50 Albums of 2024	13	
NPR	The 50 Best Albums of 2024	Unranked	
Slant	The 50 Best Albums of 2024	41	
Time	The 10 Best Albums of 2024	3	

== Commercial performance ==
I Lay Down My Life for You appeared in various charts throughout 2024. On the week of August 17, 2024, the album debuted and peaked at number 102, number 35, and number 15 on the US Billboard 200, Top R&B/Hip-Hop Albums, and Independent Albums charts, respectively. The album also peaked at number 115 on the North American College and Community Radio Chart (NACC), dated August 20; as well as number 13 on its Top 30 Hip Hop chart, dated October 1.

In the United Kingdom, I Lay Down My Life for You appeared on four album charts on the week of December 4, 2024: Record Store Albums at number seven, R&B Albums at number nine, number 30 on Independent Albums, and number 97 on Physical Albums. Additionally, the album peaked at number 25 on the Australian Hip Hop/R&B Albums chart. Elsewhere, I Lay Down My Life for You appeared on album charts from Belgium, Lithuania, New Zealand, and Scotland.

== Track listing ==
All tracks are produced by JPEGMafia, except where noted.

Standard edition
No.	Title	Writer(s)	Producer(s)	Length
1.	"I Scream This in the Mirror Before I Interact with Anyone"	Barrington Hendricks		1:48
2.	"Sin Miedo"	Hendricks; DatPiffMafia; Alex Goldblatt		2:46
3.	"I'll Be Right There"	Hendricks; DatPiffMafia; Magdalena Bay; Billy Ray Schlag		2:48
4.	"It's Dark and Hell is Hot"	Hendricks; DJ RaMeMes; Denzel Curry; FreakyMafiaCult; Goldblatt	JPEGMafia; DJ RaMeMes (O Destruidor do Funk)	2:30
5.	"New Black History" (featuring Vince Staples)	Hendricks; Staples; Harley Streten; FreakyMafiaCult	JPEGMafia; Flume^{[a]}	2:16
6.	"Don't Rely On Other Men"	Hendricks; FreakyMafiaCult; Goldblatt; DaddyMafia		2:51
7.	"Vulgar Display of Power"	Hendricks		2:52
8.	"Exmilitary"	Hendricks; Schlag		5:01
9.	"Jihad Joe"	Hendricks; Kenneth Blume III; DatPiffMafia	JPEGMafia; Kenny Beats	2:14
10.	"JPEGUltra!" (featuring Denzel Curry)	Hendricks; Curry; Blume; Nick Lee; Schlag; Goldblatt	JPEGMafia; Kenny Beats; Lee; Aver Ray; Goldblatt	4:51
11.	"Either On or Off the Drugs"	Hendricks; Schlag; Goldblatt		2:20
12.	"Loop It and Leave It"	Hendricks; Schlag		2:00
13.	"Don't Put Anything On the Bible" (featuring Buzzy Lee)	Hendricks; Sasha Spielberg; DatPiffMafia; Schlag; Goldblatt		4:04
14.	"I Recovered from This"	Hendricks; Schlag; Goldblatt		2:55
Total length:				41:24

=== I Lay Down My Life for You: Director's Cut ===
Side A additional tracks
No.	Title	Writer(s)	Producer(s)	Length
1.	"I.S. 231" (intro)	Bob Marley and the Wailers		0:49
3.	"Protect the Cross"	Hendricks; DatPiffMafia		2:49
6.	"Jordan Rules"			3:00
9.	"Cult Status"		JPEGMafia; Flume	3:12
11.	"Coke or Dope?"	Hendricks; DatPiffMafia		2:55
15.	"I Lay Down My Life for You" (featuring Buzzy Lee)	Hendricks; Spielberg		2:36
16.	"Boy You Should Know!"			3:45
21.	"Allah"			3:00
Total length:				61:18

Side B
No.	Title	Writer(s)	Producer(s)	Length
1.	"What the Hip Hop Hell is This?"			2:32
2.	"Come & Get Me"			2:45
3.	"Bloodline Freestyle" (2022 demo)		JPEGMafia; Goldblatt	2:18
4.	"Hate" (featuring FreakyMafiaCult)	FreakyMafiaCult	Kenny Beats	1:39
5.	"Take An" (instrumental)			0:35
6.	"Don't Rely On Other Men" (single version)			3:14
Total length:				74:26

=== Notes ===
- ^{^[a]} indicates an additional producer
- "Don't Rely On Other Men" features additional vocals from FreakyMafiaCult.
- "I Scream This in the Mirror Before I Interact with Anyone", "It's Dark and Hell Is Hot", "Don't Rely On Other Men", "Vulgar Display of Power", "Either On or Off the Drugs", "Loop It and Leave It", "I Recovered from This", and "I Lay Down My Life For You", are stylized in all lowercase.
- "Sin Miedo", "Jihad Joe", "JPEGUltra!", "Protect the Cross", "Cult Status", "Coke or Dope?", "Allah", "Hate", and "Take An" are stylized in all caps.
- "What the Hip Hop Hell is This?" is stylized as "What the hip hop hell is this ?"
- All Director's Cut tracks push the standard tracks one spot down, except for "Jihad Joe", which is track 7 on side B.
- The versions of "I Scream This in the Mirror Before I Interact with Anyone" and "Jordan Rules" present on the Bandcamp version of the Director's Cut feature extended instrumentals, extending their length to 2:37 and 3:30, respectively.
- The version of "Cult Status" present on the Bandcamp version features an additional verse, extending its length to 3:35.

=== Sample credits ===
- "Sin Miedo" contains samples of "Hoochie Mama", as written and performed by 2 Live Crew.
- "I'll Be Right There" contains samples of "Don't Walk Away", written by Vassal Benford and Ronald Spearman, as performed by Jade.
- "It's Dark and Hell Is Hot" contains a sample of "Upa Upa Pocoto x 170Bpm", produced by DJ RaMeMes (O Destruidor do Funk).
- "New Black History" contains a sample of "Covered N Money", written by Nayvadius Wilburn and Sonny Uwaezuoke, as performed by Future.
- "Don't Rely On Other Men" contains a sample of dialogue from "Celebration", an episode from the television series Succession, as spoken by Logan Roy.
- "Vulgar Display of Power" contains an interpolation of "Bring the Pain", written by Clifford Smith and Robert Diggs, and performed by Method Man.
- "Exmilitary" contains a sample of "After Laughter (Comes Tears)" as performed by Wendy Rene.
- "Either On or Off the Drugs" contains samples of an artificial intelligence cover of "Turn On the Lights", written by Nayvadius Wilburn, Marquel Middlebrooks, and Michael Williams, as performed by Future.
- "I Recovered from This" contains samples of "Funny How Time Flies (When You're Having Fun)", written by Janet Jackson, Jimmy Jam and Terry Lewis, as performed by Jackson.

== Personnel ==
Credits were adapted from Bandcamp and Spotify.

- JPEGMafia – vocals, production, arrangement, mixing (all tracks), guitar (tracks 1, 7–9, 14), bass (tracks 1, 3, 5, 7–9, 12–14), drums (tracks 1–2, 5, 7–10), synthesizer (tracks 3, 5–6, 12–13), piano (track 3), programming (tracks 1–3, 5–10), keyboards (track 7), string arrangements (track 8), vocal arrangements (track 13), additional guitar (track 6, 10, 13), additional guitar programming (track 2), additional drums (track 4), additional synths (track 11)
- Jeff Ellis – assistant mixing engineer
- Dale Becker – mastering (all tracks)
- Kenny Beats – production (tracks 9–10), drums (track 10)
- Alex Goldblatt – production (track 10), guitar (tracks 2, 4, 6–7, 10–11, 13–14), bass (track 10)
- Aver Ray (Billy Ray Schlag) – production (track 10), string arrangements (tracks 3, 6, 8, 10–14)
- Nick Lee – production (track 10), bass (track 10), piano (track 10), horns (track 10)
- Flume – additional production (track 5)
- Denzel Curry – additional vocals (track 4)
- Buzzy Lee – vocal arrangements (track 13)
- Members of the Mafia – vocal arrangements (track 14)
- FreakyMafiaCult – additional vocals (track 6)

Director's Cut

Credits were adapted from Bandcamp and Spotify.

- JPEGMafia – mixing (all tracks), vocals (tracks A3–B3, B7), production (tracks A3–B3, B6–B7), guitar, drums (tracks A3–A6, A11, A16, B7), bass (tracks A3–A6, A11–B2, B7), keyboards (tracks A3–A6, A16–B1), piano (track A6, A16), tambourine (track A6), programming (tracks A9–A11, A16–B3, B7), vocal arrangements (track A15), synths (track A15, A21), flute, mono synth (track A16), additional guitar (track A21), mastering, string arrangement (track B2), additional bass programming (track B3)
- Dale Becker – mastering (tracks A1–B1; B3–B7)
- Alex Goldblatt – additional guitar (track A3), guitar (track A15, A21, B2–B3), production, bass (track B3)
- Flume – production (track A9)
- Buzzy Lee – vocal arrangements (track A15)
- Aver Ray (Billy Ray Schlag) – string arrangements (track A15)
- Kenny Beats – production, programming (tracks B4, B7)
- FreakyMafiaCult – vocals (track B4)

== Charts ==
Chart (2024)	Peak position
Australian Hip Hop/R&B Albums (ARIA)	25
Belgian Albums (Ultratop Flanders)	117
Lithuanian Albums (AGATA)	60
New Zealand Albums (RMNZ)	33
Scottish Albums (Official Charts)	61
UK Independent Albums (Official Charts)	30
UK Physical Albums (Official Charts)	97
UK R&B Albums (Official Charts)	9
UK Record Store Albums (Official Charts)	7
US Billboard 200	102
US Independent Albums (Billboard)	15
US Top R&B/Hip-Hop Albums (Billboard)	35
US & Canadian College Radio Top 200 (NACC)	115
US & Canadian College Radio Top 30 Hip Hop (NACC)	13
