= Abdu Ali =

American musician

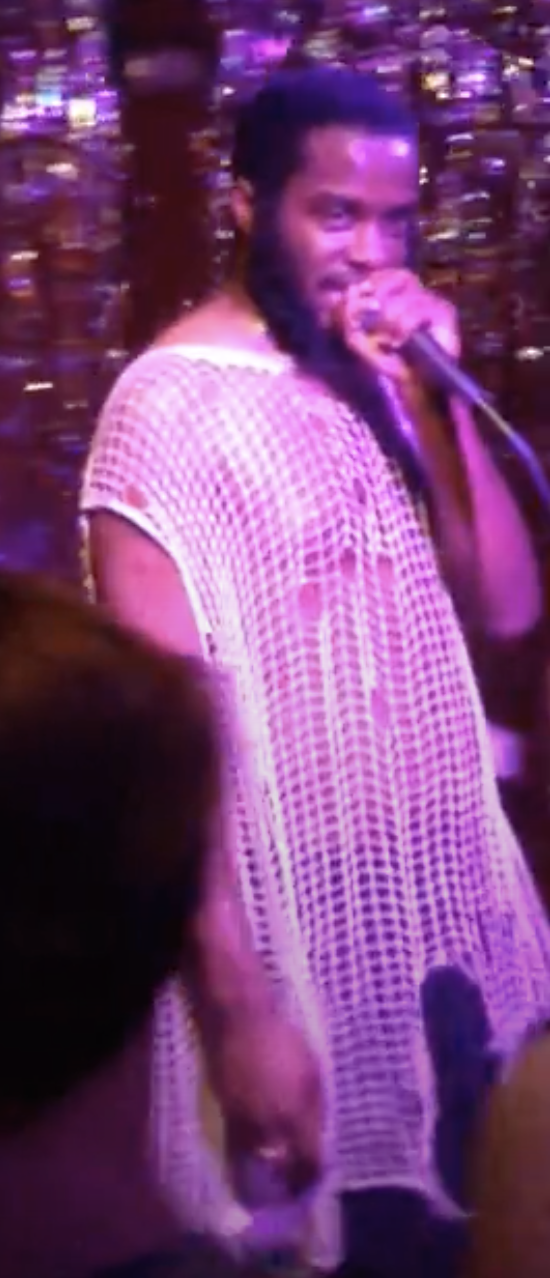
Ali performing in 2015

Abdu Ali is an American multidisciplinary musician, community activist, poet and artist based in Baltimore. In 2019, Baltimore City Major Jack Young's Office and the LGBTQ Commission honored Ali with the Artist of the Year Award. They released their first album, FIYAH!!, in 2019.

== Musical style ==
Their musical style has been described as fervent jazz with a futuristic punk rap poetry while also weaving noise punk to avant-garde rap. Their work is inspired by Baltimore Club legend and black queer icon Miss Tony. Ali's lyrics and poetry are influenced by Langston Hughes, Zora Neale Hurston, Wallace Thurmon, and Richard Nugent. The FADER described their single "Chastity" as "an unconventional, and daring call for self-love and acceptance".

== Projects ==
Ali has been involved in various projects including Kahlon, an experimental music and art event in Baltimore that hosted notable acts including Juliana Huxtable, Princess Nokia and others that lasted from 2014 to 2017. In 2017 they created drumBOOTY, a podcast for black creativity and social dialogue. They are also the founder of As They Lay, which Ali states as a "creative protect-based organism" that brings black artists together for events, programs and dialogues.

== Personal life ==
Ali is non-binary and uses they/them pronouns.

== Discography ==
=== Studio albums ===
- FIYAH!! (2019)

=== Guest appearances ===
List of non-single guest appearances, with other performing artists, showing year released and album name
Title	Year	Artist(s)	Album
"Sour Patch Kids"	2015	Simo Soo	-
"DOTS Freestyle Remix"	2019	JPEGMafia, Buzzy Lee	All My Heroes Are Cornballs
