= Manic! =

2025 song by JPEGMafia

"Manic"

Single by JPEGMafia

from the album Scaring the Hoes: Director's Cut
- Released: October 17, 2025
- Genre: Experimental hip-hop
- Length: 2:31
- Label: AWAL
- Songwriters: Barrington Hendricks; Daniel Sewell
- Producers: JPEGMafia; Alex Goose

JPEGMafia singles chronology
"Wassup" (2025)	"Manic" (2025)	"Fake Jeezy" (2026)

"Manic!" is a song by American rapper JPEGMafia released to promote the Director's Cut edition of Scaring the Hoes, his 2023 collaborative album with Danny Brown. The song was surprise released on October 17, 2025, as the only single for this edition. With co-production from Alex Goose, JPEGMafia uses his wordplay with a Logan Paul, throws verbal attacks on his "opps" for missing their marks, and shrugs off corporatism. Stylistically, the song uses "chill textures" and "Middle Eastern-inspired melodies" that gives it a cinematic tone.

== Composition ==
"Manic!
A 15-second sample of "Manic!"

"Manic!" is an experimental hip-hop track that runs for two minutes and thirty-one seconds, featuring co-production from record producer Alex Goose. In the track, JPEGMafia takes wordplay on Logan Paul, claiming that they'll need him to find his body. Though Brown is credited as a co-writer, he does not appear on the track. Throughout the track, he throws verbal attacks on his "opps" for missing their marks, and shrugs off corporatism. The track's production combines "chill textures" with JPEGMafia's energy and "Middle Eastern-inspired melodies", paving a cinematic tone.

== Release ==
"Manic!" was released on October 17, 2025 by AWAL without prior announcement, and its cover art features a Twitter screenshot showcasing a block notice from following JPEGMafia. On October 20, JPEGMafia and Brown confirmed the Director's Cut edition of Scaring the Hoes, announcing its release set two days later.
