= Stars (¥$ song) =

2024 song by Kanye West and Ty Dolla Sign

Song by ¥$

from the album Vultures 1
- Released: February 10, 2024
- Recorded: 2022–2024
- Genre: Gospel
- Length: 1:55
- Label: YZY
- Songwriters: Ye; Tyrone Griffin Jr.; Barrington Hendricks; Billy Ray Schlag; Darhyl Camper Jr.; Isaac De Boni; Konrad Żyrek; Lucien Parker; Michael Mulé; Quentin Miller; Samuel Lindley; Timothy Mosley
- Producers: Ye; Ty Dolla Sign; Aver Ray; Camper; FnZ; JPEGMafia; Shdøw; The Legendary Traxster; Timbaland

"Stars" (stylized in all caps) is a song by the American hip-hop superduo ¥$, composed of rapper Kanye West and singer Ty Dolla Sign, released as the opening track on their debut studio album, Vultures 1 (2024). The song features uncredited vocals from Camper. It was produced by the duo alongside Aver Ray, Camper, FnZ, JPEGMafia, Shdøw, the Legendary Traxster, and Timbaland. The producers served as co-writers with Lucien Parker and Quentin Miller. A dark gospel track, it features a sample of "Good Luck" by Dijon. Lyrically, the song sees West and Ty Dolla Sign boasting of their accomplishments.

"Stars" received praise from music critics, who mostly praised the composition. Focus was placed on its instrumentation and some commended the vocals, although other critics found the song underwhelming. The song debuted at number 39 on the US Billboard Hot 100, alongside reaching number 17 on the US Hot R&B/Hip-Hop Songs chart. It charted at numbers eight and ten in Latvia and Iceland, respectively. The song charted within the top 40 of eight other countries, including Canada and New Zealand, while it reached number 26 on the Billboard Global 200.

== Background ==
In October 2023, Ty Dolla Sign announced a collaborative album with Kanye West. The singer revealed their duo name of ¥$, which shows the Japanese yen symbol next to a dollar sign. The duo had previously collaborated on multiple tracks, including the singles "Only One" (2014) and "Ego Death" (2020). Their most recent collaboration was "Junya pt 2" from West's 2021 album Donda. In March 2024, Ty Dolla Sign acknowledged his loyalty to West for having believed in the rapper during both his successes and failures.

Singer-songwriter and record producer Camper had first worked with West at the age of 20, a few years before venturing to Hawaii for recording sessions with the rapper and other collaborators. Camper said that the two saw each other on multiple occasions and remained on good terms in spite of not seeing each other for another eight years. They reunited to work on Vultures 1 in Saudi Arabia from the fall of 2023 into 2024. The producer acknowledged their growth and their time separate to come together for the album, which he helped produce, including the single "Talking / Once Again". Camper was impressed with West's bravery and ambition as he learned "how to put it into what I'm doing"; he also contributed vocals to "Stars". The song was produced by West, Ty Dolla Sign, Aver Ray, Camper, FnZ, JPEGMafia, Shdøw, the Legendary Traxster, and Timbaland. The producers wrote it alongside Lucien Parker and Quentin Miller. On February 9, 2024, musician Dijon posted to Instagram Stories that he was not aware of his 2019 track "Good Luck" being sampled on the song. Following the release of the album, YZY executive Che Pope responded that Dijon "should be good".

== Composition and lyrics ==
Musically, "Stars" is a dark, slow-building gospel track. The song has a faded backdrop, combined with a sample of Dijon's vocals from "Good Luck". It features orchestral production, alongside drums. West's vocal pitch rises and falls, while Ty Dolla Sign contributes airy falsettos.

In the lyrics of "Stars", West and Ty Dolla Sign boast of accomplishments from their level of fame. West acknowledges the allegations of antisemitism against him, rapping that he keeps "a few Jews on the staff now". He addresses attempts to cancel him and losing his contracts with major brands, dismissing the contracts that were torn apart.

== Release and reception ==
On February 10, 2024, ¥$ released their debut studio album, Vultures 1, independently through YZY, including "Stars" as the opening track, changing from its previously reported title of "In the Stars". The song was met with generally positive reviews from music critics, with general praise for the composition. Paul A. Thompson from Pitchfork praised how West's singing voice changes pitch, finding this to be "at wonderful odds with [the] song's martial drums". Writing for HipHopDX, Scott Glaysher observed the song's tranquillity where West and Ty Dolla Sign sound both peaceful and confident. HotNewHipHop's Aron A. expressed that the song's orchestral production is elevated by falsettos from Ty Dolla Sign, who acts as "a vessel for Kanye's ear".

Some reviewers were less impressed. Rhian Daly of NME highlighted the song's resemblance to "Ultralight Beam" from West's album The Life of Pablo (2016), although concluded that it fails to "burn quite as bright". Michael Saponara from Billboard said that the song is darker than expected for setting the tone at the beginning of the album and serves as "more of a palette cleanser", despite noting the "poignant moment" of the Dijon sample with its faded backdrop. In a negative review for Variety, Steven J. Horowitz labeled West's line about Jews as one of his "attempts to pour gasoline on the already raging fires" that is worthy of an eye-roll.

Following the release of Vultures 1, "Stars" entered the US Billboard Hot 100 at number 39. It further opened at number 17 on the US Hot R&B/Hip-Hop Songs chart. In Canada, the song debuted at number 29 on the Canadian Hot 100 and lasted for two weeks on the chart. It reached numbers 30 and 34 in New Zealand and Australia, respectively. The song performed best in Latvia, charting at number eight on the Latvian Top 20 and it similarly reached number ten in Iceland. "Stars" also attained top 40 positions in Lithuania, Norway, Denmark, Portugal, and Switzerland, while the song charted at number 26 on the Billboard Global 200.

== Charts ==
Chart performance for "Stars"
Chart (2024)	Peak position
Australia (ARIA)	34
Australia Hip Hop/R&B (ARIA)	12
Austria (Ö3 Austria Top 40)	42
Canada Hot 100 (Billboard)	29
Denmark (Tracklisten)	30
France (SNEP)	158
Global 200 (Billboard)	26
Iceland (Tónlistinn)	10
Italy (FIMI)	92
Latvia (LAIPA)	8
Lithuania (AGATA)	18
New Zealand (Recorded Music NZ)	30
Norway (VG-lista)	22
Poland (Polish Streaming Top 100)	30
Portugal (AFP)	34
South Africa (TOSAC)	12
Sweden (Sverigetopplistan)	54
Switzerland (Schweizer Hitparade)	35
UK Hip Hop/R&B (Official Charts)	9
UK Indie (Official Charts)	6
US Billboard Hot 100	39
US Hot R&B/Hip-Hop Songs (Billboard)	17
