= LP! =

2021 studio album by JPEGMafia

- "Offline" cover

Studio album by JPEGMafia
- Released: October 22, 2021
- Recorded: 2020–2021
- Studio: JPEGMafia's home studio
- Genres: Experimental hip-hop; pop rap; punk rap
- Length: 49:02 (Online); 56:50 (Offline)
- Labels: Republic; EQT
- Producers: JPEGMafia; Buzzy Lee

JPEGMafia chronology
All My Heroes Are Cornballs (2019)	LP! (2021)	Scaring the Hoes (2023)

Singles from LP!
- 1. "Bald!" Released: February 20, 2020; 2. "Bald! Remix" Released: May 5, 2020; 3. "Cutie Pie!" Released: May 24, 2020; 4. "Trust!" Released: August 31, 2021; 5. "Hazard Duty Pay!" Released: February 23, 2022

Alternative cover
- "Online" cover

LP! is the fourth studio album by American rapper JPEGMafia. Released on October 22, 2021, his 32nd birthday, LP! is JPEGMafia's final studio album released with Republic Records and EQT Recordings. The album was released in two versions: an "online" version released on streaming services, and an "offline" version initially released on YouTube, SoundCloud, and Bandcamp (later made available on streaming services). The "offline" version features a slightly different track list due to sampling clearance issues. The album includes guest appearances from DatPiffMafia, Kimbra, Tkay Maidza, and on the "online" version, Denzel Curry.

An experimental hip-hop, pop rap, and punk rap album, JPEGMafia began working on LP! following the release of All My Heroes Are Cornballs (2019). Before the announcement of LP!, he released the EPs EP! (2020) and EP2! (2021), with its first three singles included in the former. Being under stress at the time, he took influences from pop music and pop rap and adapted them to his own experimental style. At the time, he was frustrated with the creative restrictions in his contract with Republic Records, hence his release of two versions and leaving the record label afterwards.

Sonically, LP! contains a diverse range of sounds including synthesizers, gospel, grime, glitch, and pop music. The album was produced with three different digital audio workstations (DAWs), and in contrast to JPEGMafia's previous album, it was meticulously edited while retaining its electronic sounds. Lyrically, the album leans into a playful and confrontational style while drawing from personal and emotional material compared to JPEGMafia's previous works. He considered its aggressive nature to be inspired by the socially charged music from artists such as Public Enemy and Ice Cube.

In promotion of the album, JPEGMafia released two singles—"Trust!" and "Hazard Duty Pay!"—and went on a concert tour from October 2021 to April 2022 in North America and Europe. Upon release, LP! received critical acclaim among music critics and publications, particularly the "offline" version. They praised the album for its experimental structure and production, JPEGMafia's confrontational style, and emotional lyrics. Commercially, upon its release, LP! peaked at number nine on the US Heatseekers Albums chart and appeared on the North American College and Community Radio chart. In 2024, the album appeared in three UK charts: R&B Albums, Independent Albums Breakers, and Record Store.

== Background ==
On September 13, 2019, JPEGMafia released his third studio album All My Heroes Are Cornballs, which was oriented towards pop and R&B melodies. The album received widespread critical acclaim from music critics, with JPEGMafia venturing on the JPEGMafia Type Tour to support the album. In addition, he collaborated with Danny Brown and Run the Jewels on "3 Tearz", Vegyn on "Nauseous/Devilish", and Tkay Maidza on "Awake".

On February 20, 2020, JPEGMafia released "Bald!" as a single with an accompanying music video, where he drinks tequila from a bottle before seemingly passing out. The music video centers on lo-fi aesthetics with self-recorded videos of JPEGMafia compiled together. On May 5, 2020, a remix version of the song was released with an accompanying music video featuring rapper Denzel Curry, who previously collaborated with JPEGMafia on "Vengeance" from the former's 2018 studio album Ta13oo. On May 24, JPEGMafia released "Cutie Pie!" with an accompanying music video, which depicts him in the desert.

Following months of silence, JPEGMafia released the extended play EP! to streaming services with no prior announcement on December 10, 2020, containing nine songs in its track list including its three previous singles. In an interview with Zack Lowe, JPEGMafia discussed his plans for the following year, explaining that he carefully considered his actions in advance and had already begun working on new material. He noted that, although he had not released a project that year, he intended to be very active in 2021. On February 21, 2021, JPEGMafia released the seven-track EP2!, which received a positive reception from Clash for its raw structure.

== Production ==
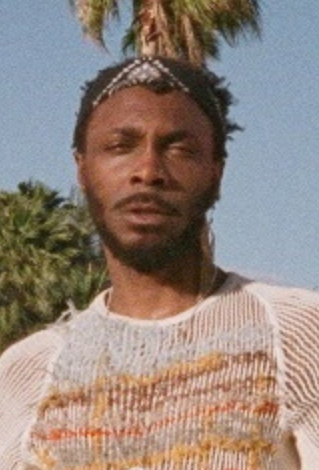
JPEGMafia in 2021, around the time he worked on LP!

JPEGMafia began working on LP! in 2020, following the release of All My Heroes Are Cornballs. Being "under a lot of stress" at the time, he was listening to "the most mainstream music possible", revolving around pop music and pop rap. He became fascinated with the idea of harnessing "that energy in an underground way", eventually making LP! as his more accessible work. For example, JPEGMafia interpolates older pop songs into his own musical style, including Britney Spears' "...Baby One More Time" (1998). According to him, she cleared the sample and listened to the track.

JPEGMafia worked on LP! with three different digital audio workstations (DAWs), switching between them to keep his ideas fresh. He cited "Nemo!" in an interview with Hypebeast as an example that originated "out of a random pack of beats" he made, which had a "new age boom bap" style. Compared to the unedited nature of All My Heroes Are Cornballs, LP! was meticulously edited. In nearly the entire album, JPEGMafia wrote, produced, recorded, mixed, and mastered each track individually, with additional production from Buzzy Lee on "Nemo!".

A few months after the release of "Bald!", Curry told JPEGMafia that he enjoyed the song and sent the latter his own verse, impressing him. JPEGMafia initially saw "Bald!" as underdeveloped until he added Curry's verse on the track. In a November 2021 interview with Office Magazine, JPEGMafia revealed that he had creative restrictions in his contract with Republic Records, including the inability to clear some samples. He did not want listeners to think that the streaming versions of his tracks were the full vision, which led him to release an "offline" version of the album for his "hardcore fans".

== Music and lyrics ==
=== Overview ===
LP! is an experimental hip-hop, pop rap, and punk rap album with hardcore hip-hop and rock influences. It also leans toward electronic sounds similar to All My Heroes Are Cornballs without disputing JPEGMafia's punk-esque delivery. Stylistically, LP! is structured on "time-spanning samples, dueling beat patterns, and ambient noise". According to Robertsona of Sputnikmusic, the album features influences from "twinkly synths, gospel, djent, distorted grime, 90's pop", and glitch.

His rapping and flows throughout the album described as "relentlessly tricky", "playful", and "unapologetically confrontational", where he uses sarcastic lyrics and pokes fun at the music industry. It serves as a draw from personal and emotional material compared to All My Heroes Are Cornballs (2019) and Veteran (2018). Anthony Fantano of The Needle Drop credited LP! as "volatile and versatile, sonically and emotionally".

According to JPEGMafia, the aggressive nature of the album represented an outlet for anger over "issues a lot of Black people go through". He saw his approach as a continuation of the socially charged music from artists including Public Enemy and Ice Cube, while expressing it through internet culture and his own musical style. Additionally, he used samples and references that gave him feelings of nostalgia.

While based on a left-field approach, Clash writer Robin Murray considered LP! to remain accessible while fitting complex ideas in its short tracks. On the other hand, Tom Briehan of Stereogum described the album's texture as sounding like "full-volume music playing on five different open tabs". The album features guest appearances from Denzel Curry, Tkay Maidza, DatPiffMafia, and Kimbra.

=== Tracks 1–9 ===
"Hazard Duty Pay!"
"Hazard Duty Pay!" highlights the chopping of Anita Baker's voice alongside JPEGMafia's energetic vocal delivery and production.

"Trust!" opens the album with a classic video game-like tune throughout the album, later dissolving into "twinkling chimes and metallic pings" as JPEGMafia's raps about his distrust of people around him, while reaffirming that he's unbothered, still "looking good", and "feeling nice." Moving towards "Dirty" on a glitchy, industrial rhythm, JPEGMAFIA targets trend-dependent artists for their "filler" lyrics and "tacky" production. The next track, "Nemo!", consists of "flickering electronic sound bytes". "End Credits!" begins with a vocal sample of Cody Rhodes during an All Elite Wrestling tournament. With the track sonically reminiscent of a 1980s arena rock sound paired with irony, JPEGMafia shows his strong disdain to "anyone who stands in his way."

On "Hazard Duty Pay!", JPEGMafia's "signature syncopated flow" stands out on a chopped vocal sample of Anita Baker with "smooth sync bassline" and "dense production." He displays his confidence throughout the track. Forwarding with "God Don't Like Ugly!", JPEGMafia compares himself to a young Frank Zappa, who shares the former's experimental sound, while referring to everyone else as Sarah Palin. "What Kinda Rappin' is This?" is a "surreal" boom bap-influenced track with a fusion of trip hop and R&B, where JPEGMafia humorously comments on hip-hop lyricism and his own artistic style.

"Thots Prayer!" contains an interpolation of Britney Spears' "...Baby One More Time" (1998) reimagined as a The Weeknd-esque auto-tuned croon that strips away its "love-song nature." "Are U Happy?" begins with a spoken intro that relates to JPEGMafia's thoughts about his record label, which states "Am I happy with the people around me? Am I happy with what I'm doing?". Following the intro, the track features a sample of Gangsta Boo's "Hard Not 2 Kill" (2001) in the background, repeating the line "If you haters wanna know bring yo' ana to the door". The sample is merged with "weird post-modern glitches" and surreal lyrics from JPEGMafia.

=== Tracks 10–20 ===
"Rebound!" revolves around "ghostly wails and funky bass" with a guest feature from DatPiffMafia, which features lyrical disses at Billy Woods and Elucid (Armand Hammer) by questioning their background. Followed by "💯", the track features various synths placed around a "warped vocal sample". "OG!", sounding like if recorded directly on cassette, features a sampled beatbox and rapping session with added drums, where JPEGMafia raps "hilariously sassy bars". In addition, the track features a sample of "The Original Gangster of Hip Hop" by Just-Ice & DMX.

JPEGMafia targets multiple targets on "Tired, Nervous & Broke!", including someone "buying a ticket to get beat up at my show." The track concludes with a somber piano outro sung by him and singer Kimbra. Robertsona of Sputnikmusic described the track's intention as similar to another JPEGMafia track "Free the Frail" (2019) but gives a much more emotional impact. "Nice!" is themed around JPEGMafia's introversion. "BMT!" builds itself on a "distorted call and response chant."

Under a grim tone with a feature from Tkay Maidza, "The Ghost of Ranking Dread!", blends West Coast synths with a "dub-like paranoia" and a "shimmering wall of synthesizers and guitars" at its conclusion. Fantano credited it as "one of the most epic and linear songs" on the album, which features a "futuristic palette" with synth and guitars. "Dam! Dam! Dam!" deals with JPEGMafia's introspection based on his fame. The track concludes with a "particularly dramatic moment" from the 1970s sitcom Good Times while retaining a "dreamy" atmosphere. Closing with "Untitled", JPEGMafia shows off a "parting flex and some words of wisdom".

=== Online version tracks ===
"Cutie Pie!" emphasizes a "rubbery bass line" and a break akin to a "Kraftwerk-like vocoder", where JPEGMafia shouts out old-school references such as Schoolly D, Magnum P.I., and Peabo Bryson. "Bald!" shows JPEGMAFIA's satirical perspective about his receding hairline, while sonically backed by expansive synths and a "rolling beat". The track is followed by its remix, featuring a verse from rapper Denzel Curry. Both tracks sample "Move Me", a drum and bass track from the video game Ridge Racer Type 4 (1999).

== Promotion and release ==
The liquor store featured on the album artwork of LP!

On August 31, 2021, JPEGMafia released "Trust!" to streaming services and announced his fourth studio album and tour. On September 30, he released the music video for "Hazard Duty Pay!", with direction from Anthony Sylvester and its visuals inspired from fisheye lens imagery. While he began performing the song in his concerts, "Hazard Duty Pay!" was excluded from the original album because of sample clearance issues. On October 18, JPEGMafia announced his fourth studio album to be titled LP! and that it would be released that week. He emphasized that there will be "online" and "offline" versions of the album, each consisting of different track listings and orders. Mainly, it was due to sample clearance issues on selected tracks. He additionally stated that it would serve as his last album on Republic Records, eventually getting out of the contract.

On October 22, LP! was released through EQT Recordings and Republic to streaming services, with its "offline" version being released on Bandcamp and YouTube. In promotion of the album, a concert tour took place throughout October and December 2021 on its North American leg, and throughout March and April 2022 on its European leg. On February 23, 2022, JPEGMafia released "Hazard Duty Pay!" on streaming services. The following day, he released an EP consisting of five tracks exclusively on the "offline" version. The "offline" version was later made available on streaming services. On December 22, he released a remaster of the "offline" version on vinyl, CD, and USB stick. This version came with new cover art, a lyric book, and instrumentals for each song.

== Critical reception ==
Professional ratings
Aggregate scores
Source	Rating
Metacritic	82/100
Review scores
Source	Rating
Clash	9/10
HipHopDX	3.7/5
The Line of Best Fit	9/10
The Needle Drop	9/10 (Note: Specifically, Fantano rated the album a "light to decent 9".)
NME	4/5 stars
Pitchfork	7.3/10
Sputnikmusic	4.5/5

LP! received critical acclaim from music critics. According to the review aggregator Metacritic, LP! received "universal acclaim" based on a weighted average score of 82 out of 100 from five critic scores. Robin Murray of Clash praised the album, stating that the album consistency doesn't repeat a similar idea twice and instead "pivots into further unexplored territories." He concludes his review by describing the album as "another triumph from one of rap's true creative visionaries." NME writer Kyann-Sian Williams shared a similar compliment to LP!, in which he described JPEGMafia's creative progress on the album as fun, recognizable, and "endlessly charming, while being "otherworldly".

Anthony Fantano of The Needle Drop considered LP! an artistic culmination of Peggy's development. While he considered the sequencing as choppy and some instrumental passages as less engaging, he saw the album as a major improvement in JPEGMafia's production and songwriting. Reflecting on the nature of the album, Kyle Kohner of The Line of Best Fit wrote that LP! shows an uncompromising expression of JPEGMafia's artistry, stating that its structure is much more intense and abrasive compared to his previous works. In addition, he argued that the "offline" version represented JPEGMafia's vision much more and cited it as a "director's cut". Sputnikmusic writer Robertsona gave the album a "superb" rating, praising it as JPEGMafia's most fully realized work at its point and complimenting its emotional substance.

Tom Breihan of Stereogum considered LP! to be a disorienting presentation of JPEGMafia's experimental style. He characterized it as "music that makes me feel like my brain is going to vomit", while complimenting it as "his great gift." HipHopDX writer Anthony Malone considered the album to be an important stage of his career, stating that it served JPEGMafia as a "way for him to take back his creativity and, most importantly, his freedom." Pitchfork writer Dylan Green praised the album's diverse production, JPEGMafia's confrontational style, and his use of anger and pop culture references. However, he criticized the "Offline" version for its sequencing and disruption of the album's momentum.

== Commercial performance ==
Upon its release, LP! debuted and peaked at number nine on the US Heatseekers Albums chart on the week of November 6, 2021. It also peaked at number 106 on the North American College and Community Radio chart, as well as peaking at number eighteen on its hip-hop chart. On the week of May 3, 2024, the album appeared in three UK charts, peaking at number 15 on R&B Albums, number 17 on Independent Albums Breakers, and number 35 on Record Store charts.

== Track listing ==
All tracks written, produced, mixed, and mastered by JPEGMAFIA, except "Nemo!", produced by JPEGMAFIA and Buzzy Lee.

LP! – Offline version
No.	Title	Writer(s)	Length
1.	"Trust!"		2:15
2.	"Dirty!"		2:07
3.	"Nemo!"		2:07
4.	"End Credits!"		1:48
5.	"Hazard Duty Pay!"		2:37
6.	"God Don't Like Ugly!"		1:19
7.	"What Kinda Rappin' Is This?"		3:09
8.	"Thots Prayer!"	Barrington Hendricks; Max Martin; Rami Yacoub	3:13
9.	"Are U Happy?"		3:05
10.	"Rebound!" (featuring DatPiffMafia)		3:35
11.	"💯"		2:00
12.	"OG!"		1:34
13.	"Dikembe!"		3:02
14.	"Tired, Nervous & Broke!" (featuring Kimbra)		5:36
15.	"🔥"		3:19
16.	"Nice!"		2:56
17.	"BMT!"		2:18
18.	"The Ghost of Ranking Dread!" (featuring Tkay Maidza)	Hendricks; Takudzwa Maidza	3:26
19.	"Dam! Dam! Dam!"		3:33
20.	"Untitled"		2:44
Total length:			56:50

LP! – Online version
No.	Title	Writer(s)	Length
1.	"Trust!"		2:14
2.	"Dirty!"		2:00
3.	"Nemo!"		2:07
4.	"End Credits!"		1:55
5.	"What Kind of Rappin' Is This?"		1:52
6.	"Thot's Prayer!"	Hendricks; Martin; Yacoub	3:07
7.	"Are U Happy?"		3:05
8.	"Rebound!" (featuring DatPiffMafia)		3:44
9.	"OG!"		1:35
10.	"Dam! Dam! Dam!"		3:29
11.	"Sick, Nervous & Broke!"		5:24
12.	"Kissy Face Emoji!"		3:25
13.	"Nice!"		1:36
14.	"BMT!"		2:22
15.	"The Ghost of Ranking Dread!" (featuring Tkay Maidza)	Hendricks; Maidza	3:27
16.	"Cutie Pie!"		2:26
17.	"Bald!"		2:32
18.	"Bald! Remix" (featuring Denzel Curry)	Hendricks; Curry	2:33
Total length:			49:02

=== Notes ===
- All track names are stylized in uppercase.
- "End Credits!" contains a sample of Cody Rhodes speaking during an All Elite Wrestling tournament.
- "Hazard Duty Pay" contains a sample by Alex Goose.
- "Thot's Prayer!" contains an interpolation of "...Baby One More Time" by Britney Spears.
- "Are U Happy?" contains a sample of "Hard Not 2 Kill" by Gangsta Boo.
- "OG!" contains a sample of "The Original Gangster of Hip Hop" by Just-Ice & DMX.
- "The Ghost of Ranking Dread!" contains a sample from the 1970s sitcom Good Times.

== Personnel ==
Credits are adapted from the digital booklet.

- JPEGMafia – production, songwriting, mixing, mastering (all tracks), piano ("Tired, Nervous & Broke!")
- DatPiffMafia – featured vocals, songwriting ("Rebound!")
- Tkay Maidza – featured vocals, songwriting ("The Ghost of Ranking Dread!")
- Denzel Curry – featured vocals, songwriting ("Bald! Remix")
- Alex Goose – sample replay ("Hazard Duty Pay!")
- Buzzy Lee – additional production ("Nemo!")
- Kimbra – additional vocals ("Tired, Nervous & Broke!")

== Charts ==
2021 chart performance for LP!
Chart (2021)	Peak position
US Heatseekers Albums (Billboard)	9
US & Canadian College Radio Top 200 (NACC)	106
US & Canadian College Radio Top 30 Hip Hop (NACC)	18

2024 chart performance for LP!
Chart (2024)	Peak position
UK Independent Albums Breakers (Official Charts)	17
UK R&B Albums (Official Charts)	15
UK Record Store (Official Charts)	35
