= Scaring the Hoes =

2023 studio album by JPEGMafia and Danny Brown

- Album cover, based on the Sweet Jesus, Preacherman and Hit Man posters.

Studio album by JPEGMafia and Danny Brown
- Released: March 24, 2023
- Genre: Alternative hip-hop
- Length: 36:19
- Label: AWAL
- Producer: JPEGMafia

JPEGMafia chronology
LP! (2021)	Scaring the Hoes (2023)	I Lay Down My Life for You (2024)

Danny Brown chronology
UKnoWhatImSayin? (2019)	Scaring the Hoes (2023)	Quaranta (2023)

Singles from Scaring the Hoes
- 1. "Lean Beef Patty" Released: March 13, 2023; 2. "Scaring the Hoes" Released: March 21, 2023

Scaring the Hoes (also known as Scaring the Hoes, Vol. 1, both stylized in all caps) is a collaborative studio album by American rappers JPEGMafia and Danny Brown. It was released on March 24, 2023, through AWAL and Bandcamp as a pay-what-you-want download. It was produced by JPEGMafia and included a sole guest appearance by independent Maryland rapper Redveil. The album had been teased for a year leading up to the release of its first single, "Lean Beef Patty", on March 13, with the album's official title being announced the same day. On March 21, the title track from the album was released as a single. On July 11, an EP expansion to the album, titled Scaring the Hoes: DLC Pack, was released, which expanded the tracklist from fourteen to eighteen songs.

Scaring the Hoes was released to widespread critical acclaim, who praised the chemistry between JPEGMafia and Brown, as well as the production of the album. In the United States, Scaring the Hoes debuted at number 84 on the Billboard 200 alongside entering at 39 on the Top R&B/Hip-Hop Albums chart. The album charted in six other countries, including Canada and the United Kingdom. It appeared high on many critic year-end lists.

== Background and recording ==
On March 28, 2022, JPEGMafia was invited as a guest for NTS Radio, performing in London, playing songs from artists such as Björk, Sky Ferreira, Big K.R.I.T., and Black Rob. Around the 39-minute mark of the session, he previewed the early version of the song "Burfict!" (titled after the football player), which featured Danny Brown. The duo later performed the song at Smoker's Club Fest in April 2022. Brown later confirmed that the two would release a collaborative album, saying "So yeah, Danny Brown and JPEGMAFIA album. Y’all just heard the first song, coming soon. Motherfuckers get ready for Peggy and Danny, bitch." The album was expected to be JPEGMafia's first release since his critically acclaimed LP!, released on October 22, 2021, as well as Brown's first album since UKnoWhatImSayin?, which was released on October 4, 2019, and also garnered critical acclaim.

On January 15, 2023, JPEGMafia shared images of Brown and himself working in the studio via Twitter and revealed that the album would be released in the same year. In episode 43 of The Danny Brown Show podcast (aired February 28, 2023), Brown invited JPEGMafia on the show to talk about the album, where they revealed the tentative album title (Scaring the Hoes, Vol. 1) and previewed the album's first single, "Lean Beef Patty". On March 13, the single was released to streaming services, alongside its music video and an announcement of the album's release date. On March 21, the title track "Scaring the Hoes" was released as the second single from the album, accompanied by a music video. Both singles were well received by critics, who praised the production and performances by the duo. In 2025, the Bandcamp page for Scaring the Hoes had its album cover replaced with Donald Trump and Kim Jong Un.

=== Production and style ===
Scaring the Hoes was primarily produced using the Roland SP-404SX. JPEGMafia described the production process as akin to a "practice session", remarking, "this is what we would sound like in the 90s with no Pro Tools". On the album, JPEGMAFIA maintains his "liberal sampling philosophy", utilizing samples from soul, gospel, and 2000's music. Scaring the Hoes was described by the Rolling Stone as the opposite of chart dominant R&B crossovers. Instead, JPEGMafia and Brown created "a mashup" of experimental hip-hop. The album is characterized by its experimental and industrial sound. It embraces elements of indie and alternative rap scenes and features a "raw, almost punk edge", rejecting mainstream hip-hop conventions.

== Tour ==
In support of Scaring the Hoes, JPEGMafia and Brown announced a North American concert tour on April 24. The tour was scheduled to begin in Nashville, Tennessee on July 25. From there, the two embarked on a 20-city stint throughout the United States. The final show of the tour took place in Dallas, Texas on August 26.

== Critical reception ==
Professional ratings
Aggregate scores
Source	Rating
AnyDecentMusic?	8.0/10
Metacritic	86/100
Review scores
Source	Rating
AllMusic	4.5/5 stars
Clash	9/10
DIY	5/5 stars
Exclaim!	9/10
The Guardian	4/5 stars
HipHopDX	3.8/5
The Line of Best Fit	9/10
MusicOMH	3.5/5 stars
Pitchfork	7.1/10
Rolling Stone	4/5 stars

Scaring the Hoes was met with widespread critical acclaim. On review aggregator Metacritic, which assigns a normalized rating out of 100 from mainstream publications, the album received an average score of 86, based on 13 reviews, indicating "universal acclaim". Aggregator AnyDecentMusic? gave it 8.0 out of 10, based on their assessment of the critical consensus.

Reviewing the album for AllMusic, Fred Thomas stated that Scaring the Hoes was "defiantly anti-pop", but still managed to achieve something "unexpectedly catchy and captivating." He also referred to the album as crowded, confusing, and ridiculous, but concluded that thanks to the performances from JPEGMafia and Brown, it still remained exciting. Writing for Clash, Robin Murray called it, "A nerve-jangling experience" as well as describing it as JPEGMafia and Brown's masterpiece. In a five-star review from DIY, Matthew Davies Lombardi described that the album "overdelivers time and time again".

Wesley McLean of Exclaim!, praised JPEGMafia's ability to "forge these undeniably hard, speaker-knocking instrumentals that are simultaneously muddled and grimy messes" and referred to it as "his superpower". The Guardian editor Alexis Petridis, characterized the album as "smart but chaotic, funny but disturbing" as well as describing it as a "confounding victory". Steven Loftin, in his review for The Line of Best Fit, perceived the album to be more of a showcase for JPEGMafia's production skills, complimenting the added dimension brought by Brown's energetic flow. Loftin also highlighted Brown's unique wit and tone, stating these elements contribute a significant amount of personality, sparking the energy of the album.

MusicOMH writer Justin Devlin was more critical, suggesting the duo could benefit from more polish and focus in future projects, while also acknowledging the unique and appealing "madcap chemistry" between Brown and JPEGMafia. Pete Tosiello of Pitchfork noted Brown's brisk delivery in the album, describing him as meeting "JPEG's tempos with alacrity", but also criticized the mix, saying it "does not do Brown many favors". Writing for the Rolling Stone, Jeff Ihaza characterized it as being "distorted right up to the point of destruction", and also referred to it as being "scary", while stating that those traits make the album compelling.

=== Year-end lists ===
Select year-end rankings of Scaring the Hoes
Critic/Publication	List	Rank	Ref.
Consequence	The 50 Best Albums of 2023	40	
Exclaim!	Exclaim!'s 50 Best Albums of 2023	5	
Paste	The 50 Best Albums of 2023	38	
Rolling Stone	The 100 Best Albums of 2023	19	
Stereogum	The 50 Best Albums of 2023	14	
The Line of Best Fit	The Best Albums of 2023	10	

== Track listing ==
All tracks are written by Barrington Hendricks and Daniel Sewell; "Kingdom Hearts Key" co-written by Marcus Morton. All tracks are produced by JPEGMafia.

Scaring the Hoes track listing
No.	Title	Length
1.	"Lean Beef Patty"	1:47
2.	"Steppa Pig"	3:27
3.	"Scaring the Hoes"	2:22
4.	"Garbage Pale Kids"	2:48
5.	"Fentanyl Tester"	2:37
6.	"Burfict!"	2:21
7.	"Shut Yo Bitch Ass Up / Muddy Waters"	2:54
8.	"Orange Juice Jones"	2:21
9.	"Kingdom Hearts Key" (featuring Redveil)	3:25
10.	"God Loves You"	2:28
11.	"Run the Jewels"	1:04
12.	"Jack Harlow Combo Meal"	2:18
13.	"HOE (Heaven on Earth)"	3:23
14.	"Where Ya Get Ya Coke From?"	2:57
Total length:		36:11

Scaring the Hoes: DLC Pack track listing
No.	Title	Length
1.	"Guess What Bitch, We Back Hoe!"	2:58
2.	"Hermanos"	4:25
3.	"Tell Me Where to Go"	2:53
4.	"No! No! No! No! No! No! No! No! No! No! No! No! No! No! No! No! No! No! No! No! No! No! No! No! No! No! No! No! No! No! No! No!"	5:05
Total length:		15:21

Scaring the Hoes: Director's Cut additional track listing
No.	Title	Length
19.	"Manic!" (performed by JPEGMafia)	2:31
20.	"Child's Play" (performed by Danny Brown)	1:07
21.	"Roaches"	2:53
Total length:		58:03

Notes

- "Scaring the Hoes", "Hermanos" and "No! No! No! No! No! No! No! No! No! No! No! No! No! No! No! No! No! No! No! No! No! No! No! No! No! No! No! No! No! No! No! No!" are stylized in upper case.
- The Director's Cut adds "Guess What Bitch, We Back Hoe!" as track 1, "Tell Me Where to Go" as track 13, "Hermanos" as track 15, and "No! No! No! No! No! No! No! No! No! No! No! No! No! No! No! No! No! No! No! No! No! No! No! No! No! No! No! No! No! No! No! No!" as track 18. The rest of the songs are listed in their standard order.

Samples

- "Lean Beef Patty" samples "I Need a Girl (Part Two)" by P. Diddy and Ginuwine featuring Loon, Mario Winans, and Tammy Ruggeri.
- "Steppa Pig" samples "Gone" by the boy band NSYNC and a small vocal sample from a Rob49 song "Vulture Island"
- "Scaring the Hoes" samples a live performance of "Untitled" by Dirty Beaches.
- "Fentanyl Tester" samples "Milkshake" by Kelis.
- "Burfict!" interpolates "Procession of the Levites" by Richard Smallwood.
- "Orange Juice Jones" samples "Dear Michael" by Michael Jackson and "Just Dance" by Lady Gaga featuring Colby O'Donis.
- "Kingdom Hearts Key" samples "Yakusoku wa Iranai" by Maaya Sakamoto.
- "God Loves You" samples "You Don't Know" by Timothy Wright, Jerome L. Ferrell and Lighthouse Inter-Denominational Choir and "BabyWipe" by Ski Mask the Slump God.
- "Run the Jewels" samples "Going Back to Cali" by LL Cool J and "Cosmic Raindance" by Cybotron.
- "Manic!" samples "Manic! At The Disco" by Danny!.
- "Jack Harlow Combo Meal" samples "I'm Old Fashioned" by Bill Charlap Trio.
- "HOE (Heaven on Earth)" samples "I Will Lift Up Mine Eyes" by Avondale Community Choir.
- "Where Ya Get Ya Coke From?" samples the score of Sweet Jesus, Preacherman, composed by Horace Tapscott.

== Personnel ==
Credits adapted from Bandcamp and Tidal.

- Barrington "JPEGMafia" Hendricks – vocals, producer, mixing
- Daniel "Danny Brown" Sewell – vocals
- Marcus "Redveil" Morton – vocals (track 9)
- Jeff Ellis – mixing (tracks 1, 5–7, 9, 13, and 14)
- Dale Becker – mastering
- Pat Dagle – artwork

== Charts ==
Chart performance for Scaring the Hoes
Chart (2023)	Peak position
Belgian Albums (Ultratop Flanders)	143
Canadian Albums (Billboard)	62
Irish Albums (IRMA)	55
Lithuanian Albums (AGATA)	50
New Zealand Albums (RMNZ)	32
Scottish Albums (Official Charts)	11
UK Albums (Official Charts)	82
UK R&B Albums (Official Charts)	1
US Billboard 200	84
US Top R&B/Hip-Hop Albums (Billboard)	39

== Release history ==
Release dates and formats for Scaring the Hoes
Region	Date	Format	Version	Label	Ref.
Various	March 24, 2023	Digital download; streaming	Standard	AWAL; Peggy	
Various	2023	Cassette; CD; LP	Standard	Peggy	
