= All My Heroes Are Cornballs =

2019 studio album by JPEGMAFIA

- Standard digital and streaming cover

Studio album by JPEGMafia
- Released: September 13, 2019
- Recorded: 2018–2019
- Studio: JPEGMAFIA's home studio
- Genres: Experimental hip-hop; punk rap
- Length: 45:17
- Label: EQT
- Producers: JPEGMafia; Vegyn

JPEGMafia chronology
Veteran (2018)	All My Heroes Are Cornballs (2019)	LP! (2021)

Alternative cover
- Bandcamp and vinyl cover

Singles from All My Heroes Are Cornballs
- 1. "Jesus Forgive Me, I Am a Thot" Released: August 13, 2019; 2. "Beta Male Strategies" Released: September 10, 2019

All My Heroes Are Cornballs is the third studio album by the American rapper and record producer JPEGMafia, released on September 13, 2019, by EQT Recordings. After releasing his second studio album, Veteran (2018), he began recording tracks for its follow-up, ultimately creating around 93 tracks. JPEGMafia handled the production, mixing, and mastering in his home studio. The album features guest appearances from Abdu Ali, Helena Deland, and Buzzy Lee, as well as additional vocals by Refined Sugar, Vegyn, and Young Emoji. Vegyn also serves as a co-producer on one track.

An avant-garde, experimental hip-hop, and punk rap album, All My Heroes Are Cornballs draws influences from experimental pop, glitch hop, ambient, noise, and industrial music. It has a smoother and more melodic sound than its predecessor, employing unconventional song structures, extensive sampling, and a variety of vocal techniques, including rapping, screaming, and singing, often in falsetto. Thematically, the album is personal and introspective, presented in a stream of consciousness style, and touches on Internet culture, political issues, and JPEGMafia's newfound fame.

The album was promoted as a "disappointment", with videos released on the rapper's YouTube channel, alongside two singles: "Jesus Forgive Me, I Am a Thot" and "Beta Male Strategies". It was supported by the JPEGMafia Type Tour, which began in North America on October 14, 2019, and concluded in Europe on July 6, 2020. Upon release, All My Heroes Are Cornballs received widespread acclaim from music critics, many of whom highlighted its humorous and sarcastic lyrical content. Others praised the album's detailed and chaotic production, with some considering it an improvement over Veteran. It appeared in numerous publications' year-end lists. All My Heroes Are Cornballs debuted at number 105 on the Billboard 200, marking JPEGMafia's first entry on the chart, and number 17 on the Independent Albums chart. The album charted on the North American College and Community Radio Chart (NACC) and three UK charts, as well as appearing on charts from Lithuania, Ireland, and Canada.

== Background and recording ==
JPEGMafia is an American rapper and producer who began his career under the name Devon Hendryx while serving in the U.S. Air Force, releasing projects such as Dreamcast Summer Songs (2009) and The Ghost~Pop Tape (2013). He began rapping under the name JPEGMafia in 2015 with the releases of his mixtapes, Communist Slow Jams (2015) and Darkskin Manson (2015), later releasing his debut album, Black Ben Carson (2016). He followed with the release of his second and breakthrough studio album, Veteran (2018), which was critically acclaimed for JPEGMafia's experimental approach to hip-hop production alongside his political themes.

JPEGMafia began working on his next album, recording 93 or 94 tracks around that time. "Beta Male Strategies" and "Grimy Waifu" were among the first tracks recorded. By the end of 2018, JPEGMAFIA had completed recording, with mixing and mastering taking place in 2019. He produced, mixed, and mastered the tracks in his home studio, as he had done for Veteran. JPEGMafia regularly shared progress updates on his Instagram account, noting that the project was 35% complete in March 2019 and 52% complete in May 2019.

== Music and lyrics ==
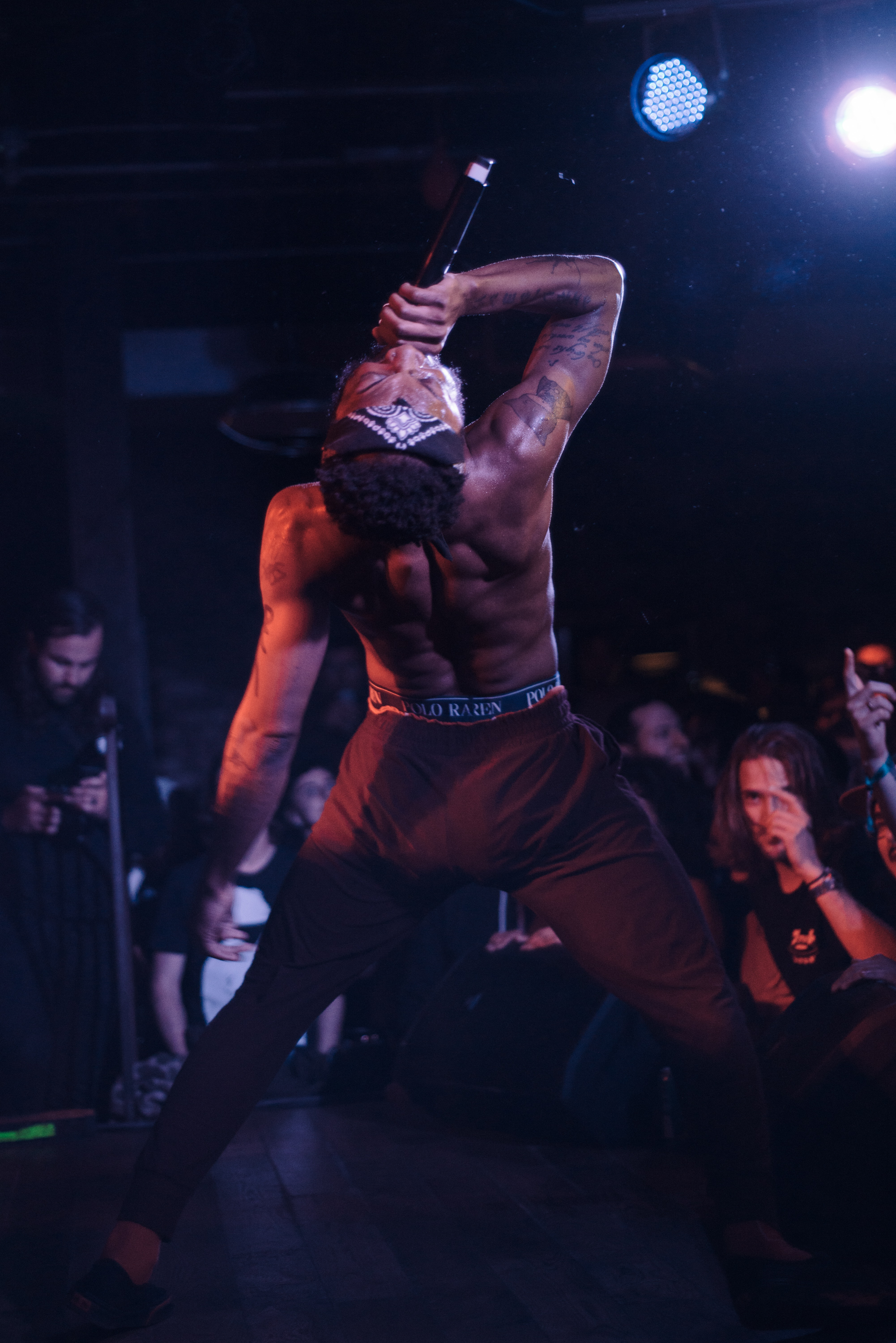
JPEGMafia performing in Calgary in August 2019, nearly a month before the album's release.

All My Heroes Are Cornballs is an avant-garde experimental hip-hop and punk rap album. It features sound collages and draws influences from ambient music, glitch hop, noise, industrial, and experimental pop, as well as elements of trap, R&B, and vaporwave. The album contains eighteen tracks and has a runtime of forty-five minutes. Thomas Hobbs of BBC News noted that JPEGMafia draws from punk rock influences with JPEGMafia rapping satirical Internet-coded lyrics under uneven beats built around "distortion and screaming synths".

The album is loosely structured (Note: Despite Hobbs' depiction of the album as "meticulously sequenced", it was also described as a "stitched-together music mess", "deliberately disjointed", "loosely constructed" and lacking cohesion.) and characterized by constant tonal and vocal shifts, erratic and "random" use of samples and noises, and unconventional song structures, traits also prevalent on his previous album. Compared to the confrontational tone and political themes of Veteran, critics generally perceive All My Heroes Are Cornballs as more melodic and less abrasive than its predecessor with JPEGMafia's high-tenor vocals ranging "from a goofy falsetto to a strained scream rap". He has described the album as his "punk musical", calling it vulnerable, introspective, and his most personal work to date. He cites the Beach Boys' Smile (2011), TLC's FanMail (1999), Björk, Cam'ron, Everything but the Girl, Kanye West, and Rick Rubin as influences.

Thematically, many critics have noted the album's engagement with Internet culture. Its lyrics are often stream of consciousness, and ironic, appealing "to the self-aware and overtly ironic mindset of this age". The album also contains progressive political content and scathing social commentary. JPEGMafia's "persona is built on opposition", as he raps against racism, "posers", his "haters", police brutality, political extremism, right-wing politics, groupthink critics, and online shitposters. The lyrics additionally reflect on his recent fame and include numerous pop culture references, such as wrestling, anime, and video games. Evan Welsh of Spectrum Culture described the album as "outwardly political and dissatisfied while also being ironic, cynical, and funny". Some tracks are performed from a female perspective, using gendered terms like "thot", "slut", and "girl".

== Tracks ==
=== Tracks 1–9 ===
"Jesus Forgive Me, I Am a Thot"
"Jesus Forgive Me, I Am a Thot" contains R&B influences with JPEGMafia's singing-rapping highlighted throughout the chorus under distorted samples.

"Kenan vs. Kel"
The second half of "Kenan Vs. Kel" emphasizes a punk-influenced sound, where he screams his lines under "gnarly" guitars.

The album's opener, "Jesus Forgive Me, I Am a Thot", begins with the noise of shattering glass and screaming people before transitioning into a "sickly soulful" guitar. It is built around a broken piano riff and ethereal, distorted vocal samples, with heavy R&B influence. JPEGMAFIA's mellow rapping gives way to screaming halfway through the first verse. Using Auto-Tune, he sing-raps the "melodic lines" of the refrain: "I can't feel my face, oh God!/SMH, no ASMR". The next track, "Kenan vs. Kel", starts off "calm and reflective" over a keyboard riff that transforms into a dusty beat. JPEGMafia "seductively croons" and expresses real uncertainty about his newfound fame. Midway through, the track shifts to a punk rock-inspired instrumental, featuring a percussive power chord, "gnarly" guitars, and forceful drums, over which he screams his lines.

The third track, "Beta Male Strategies", is a pop rap-oriented noise rap track with "a manipulated vocal sample, hand claps, rave-ready drums, and a smidge of guitar", confronting and poking fun at the alt-right and internet trolls. The instrumental "JPEGMafia Type Beat" serves as an homage to Atari Teenage Riot and has been interpreted by critics as a satire of "type beats" in contemporary hip-hop production, as well as his comparisons to Blackie and, more frequently, Death Grips.

"Grimy Waifu" is a mellow, guitar-backed downtempo ode to a gun disguised as a love song, inspired by JPEGMafia's time in the military; it is followed by "PTSD", an anxious track with murky synths and breakbeats, inspired by his military past. "Rap Grow Old & Die x No Child Left Behind" references Bobby Brown and Michael Jackson to mock whitewashing in the music industry and also features him singing about "the unfair cycle of society". The title track is a glitchy track with elements of pop rap, which features JPEGMafia singing and reflecting on the album's themes. The outro contains a recording of his friend ordering a bacon smokehouse meal from Wendy's, which he described as "really random" and nearly cut from the album. The next track, "BBW", interpreted as "Black Brian Wilson", is a "brief, simple" classic hip-hop-style track about JPEGMafia's mortality and place in the industry.

=== Tracks 10–18 ===
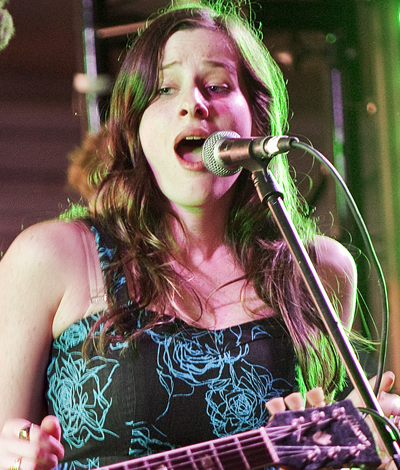
"DOTS Freestyle Remix", a remix of JPEGMafia's performance on Kenny Beats's The Cave, features vocals from musician Buzzy Lee (pictured in 2013).

The tenth track, "Prone!", features "ugly" and "demented" synths alongside a precise, aggressive vocal performance from JPEGMafia, in which he threatens "to kick his enemies to the floor", particularly the line "one shot turn Steve Bannon into Steve Hawking". Pitchfork noted his resistance to white nationalism on the track. Its spacey, ambient-like outro includes a cover of Wayne Wonder's "No Letting Go" (2003). JPEGMafia stated that the track was made completely digitally, intending to create "a punk song with no instruments". The interlude, "Lifes Hard, Here's a Song about Sorrel", references hibiscus tea (called "sorrel" in Jamaica), serving as an homage to his Jamaican heritage. "Thot Tactics" is melodic and features a "sticky" hook. "Free the Frail", which was considered for removal from the album, contains guest vocals from Helena Deland, with bright synths, mellow piano, and "such a cool chord change", as Deland exclaims later in the track. On the chorus, JPEGMafia sings, "Don't rely on the strength of my image". Critics track's vulnerability and described it as an "honest account of anxiety".

"Post Verified Lifestyle" is structured in three sections, with an ambient beat, ad-libs, and clipped vocals; the final section consists of looping vocal samples. In the track, JPEGMafia delivers braggadocious lyrics with "a hint of claustrophobia", comparing himself to MF Doom, Beanie Sigel, the Beatles, and 98 Degrees. "BasicBitchTearGas" is a short, dissonant, skit-like pop track featuring "glitchy backing, stuttering acoustic guitar and manipulated vocals", covering TLC's "No Scrubs" (1999). "DOTS Freestyle Remix" is a remix of JPEGMafia's performance on The Cave, a YouTube series by Kenny Beats in which he and his guests create a track on-camera. The track includes guest vocals from Buzzy Lee and Abdu Ali, a prominent sound of fire (from campfires recorded in Hawaii), a "cutesy" synth tune, and a vaporwave outro. "Buttermilk Jesus Type Beat" is an instrumental track built around "lucid piano and spacious drum programming". The album closes with "Papi I Missed U", described as a "thesis statement" addressing racism, gun violence in the U.S., and JPEGMafia's fame and criticism of his own work.

== Release and promotion ==
"There's nothing going on here but disappointment, okay? That's what's coming next. I don't know what that's going to sound like specifically, but when the disappointment comes, it comes. ... It's just really whack shit. You know, when you get your hopes up for something, and it doesn't fall through? I just want to recreate that feeling."

— JPEGMafia on the album, in an interview with the Recording Academy.

Prior to the album's release, JPEGMafia frequently labeled All My Heroes Are Cornballs as a "disappointment". He promoted the album through a series of videos on his YouTube channel, which included listening sessions, discussions, and mock negative reactions from artists such as James Blake, Kenny Beats, Buzzy Lee, DJ Dahi, Channel Tres, and Jeff Tweedy. On August 13, 2019, JPEGMafia released the album's lead single, "Jesus Forgive Me, I Am a Thot". On August 28, he officially announced that his third album would be titled All My Heroes Are Cornballs, with a release date of September 13. On September 10, he released the second single, "Beta Male Strategies". Two days later, a listening party for the album took place in Baltimore, Maryland.

The album artwork was designed by Alec Marchant, JPEGMafia's photographer and close friend. All My Heroes Are Cornballs was supported by the JPEGMafia Type Tour, which took place across Canada and the US from October 14 to November 11. The second part of the tour took occurred in Europe from February 20 to July 6, 2020. On November 11, 2019, he released a music video for "Free the Frail". On February 29, 2020, JPEGMafia announced a "Mystery USB" in the style of PlayStation 2 Memory Cards, limited to 100 copies for sale on his website.

== Critical reception ==
Professional ratings
Aggregate scores
Source	Rating
AnyDecentMusic?	8.1/10
Metacritic	85/100
Review scores
Source	Rating
AllMusic	4/5 stars
Clash	8/10
Exclaim!	9/10
HipHopDX	4.5/5
NME	5/5 stars
Pitchfork	7.6/10
Q	3/5 stars
The Skinny	4/5 stars
Sputnikmusic	5/5
Tiny Mix Tapes	4/5 marks

All My Heroes Are Cornballs was met with widespread acclaim from music critics. Some considered the album to be an improvement over Veteran thanks to the album's consistent and melodic sound, unconventional structures, and eclectic production. On review aggregator Metacritic, which assigns a normalized rating out of 100 from mainstream publications, the album received an average score of 85 from fourteen reviews, indicating "universal acclaim". The aggregator AnyDecentMusic? gave the album 8.1 out of 10, reflecting its critical consensus.

In a review for Pitchfork, Stephen Kearse described JPEGMafia as "bubbly and inventive", a provocateur, an "impish writer", and an "athletic vocalist". Nick Roseblade of Clash noted that the album's lyrics "[feel] very stream of consciousness, full of political commentary, [and] the concerns of living in American 2019, [sic] whilst being engaging, humorous, and informative", adding that the key to the album is its "juxtaposition of sounds, and textures". Sam Higgins of The Line of Best Fit, wrote that the album is "so questionable, unique, and conflicted in its elements that, on first glance, it's uninviting and dissonant", but reveals an "undeniable quality" upon closer listening.

Alexander Robertson (robertsona) of Sputnikmusic considered the album to be showcasing "signs of a true classic", commending its "daring attitude and commitment to odd sonic luxuries". Thomas Hobbs of NME described the record as JPEGMafia's most accomplished and unexpected work, "meticulously sequenced, where anger frequently gives way to tranquillity". Josh Svetz of HipHopDX characterized the album as "challenging and uncompromising" and "a manifesto for the misunderstood", highlighting JPEGMafia's "insane production and brilliant engineering". Eli Schoop of Tiny Mix Tapes called All My Heroes Are Cornballs one of the best-produced albums of the year, likening it to an electronic manifesto and auditory guerrilla warfare. He compared it to James Ferraro's Far Side Virtual (2011), noting that both are inspired by "internet anxiety", with JPEGMafia's "memetic technology and kinetic mindset" resembling Ferraro's "dread of automation and late-stage capitalism web osteria".

Kieran Press-Reynolds of Highsnobiety echoed this sentiment, stating that JPEGMafia "nails the chaos of post-internet society" and comparing his writing to Virginia Woolf, "who felt overwhelmed by modernity and tried to describe it in the best way they could". Press-Reynolds also described the album as a "better hodgepodge of empowered tumult" than Veteran. Tony Inglis of The Skinny was somewhat critical of the lyrical content but praised JPEGMafia's "ability to tap into the zeitgeist" and his skills as a producer. In a less enthusiastic review, Kate Solomon of Q remarked that "JPEGMafia's flashes of brilliance are obscured by a bloated tracklist, but they're worth digging out".

=== Accolades ===
Award nominations for All My Heroes Are Cornballs
Publication	List	Rank
Afisha Daily (Russia)	The Best Foreign Albums of 2019	8
AllMusic	Favorite Rap & Hip-Hop Albums	—N/a
Clash	Clash Albums of The Year 2019	36
Dazed	The 20 best albums of 2019	10
Flood Magazine	The Best Albums of 2019	21
Gorilla vs. Bear	Gorilla vs. Bear's Albums of 2019	13
Loud and Quiet	The Loud and Quiet best 40 albums of 2019	8
NME	The 50 best albums of 2019	28
Paper	Paper's Top 20 Albums of 2019	18
Paste	The 50 Best Albums of 2019	35
PopMatters	The 70 Best Albums of 2019	35
PopMatters	The 20 Best Hip-Hop Albums of 2019	9
The Line of Best Fit	The Best Albums of 2019 Ranked	49
Treble	The Top 50 Albums of 2019	10
Under the Radar	Under the Radar's Top 100 Albums of 2019	98
Vinyl Me, Please	The Best Albums of 2019	—N/a
The Wire	Top 50 Releases of 2019	20

== Commercial success ==
Upon release, All My Heroes Are Cornballs appeared in multiple charts. It debuted at number 105 on the Billboard 200, marking JPEGMafia's first entry on the chart, as well as peaking at number 17 on Independent Albums. The album also peaked at number 22 on the North American College and Community Radio Chart (NACC). In the UK, it appeared on three charts, peaking at number 97 on Album Downloads, number 29 on R&B Albums, and number 24 on Record Store charts. Internationally, the album charted at number 37 on Lithuanian Albums, number 86 on Irish Albums, and number 94 on Canadian Albums charts.

== Track listing ==
All tracks are written by Barrington Hendricks, except where noted.

Standard edition
No.	Title	Writer(s)	Length
1.	"Jesus Forgive Me, I Am a Thot"		2:36
2.	"Kenan vs. Kel"		3:01
3.	"Beta Male Strategies"		3:18
4.	"JPEGMafia Type Beat"		0:54
5.	"Grimy Waifu"		2:55
6.	"PTSD"		2:28
7.	"Rap Grow Old & Die x No Child Left Behind"		2:47
8.	"All My Heroes Are Cornballs"		3:23
9.	"BBW"		1:36
10.	"Prone!"		2:42
11.	"Life's Hard, Here's a Song about Sorrel"		1:01
12.	"Thot Tactics"		2:50
13.	"Free the Frail" (featuring Helena Deland)	Barrington Hendricks; Helena Deland	3:30
14.	"Post Verified Lifestyle"		3:35
15.	"BasicBitchTearGas"	Kandi Burruss^{[a]}; Kevin Briggs^{[a]}; Tameka Cottle^{[a]}; Lisa Lopes^{[a]}; Hendricks	1:15
16.	"DOTS Freestyle Remix" (featuring Buzzy Lee and Abdu Ali)		2:07
17.	"Buttermilk Jesus Type Beat"		1:09
18.	"Papi I Missed U"		4:02
Total length:			45:17

USB Director's Cut edition
No.	Title	Length
1.	"Jesus Forgive Me, I Am a Thot" (USB Mix)	3:04
2.	"Kenan vs. Kel"	3:01
3.	"Beta Male Strategies"	3:31
4.	"Grimy Waifu" (USB Mix)	3:50
5.	"PTSD"	2:28
6.	"Rap Grow Old & Die x No Child Left Behind"	2:48
7.	"All My Heroes Are Cornballs"	3:24
8.	"BBW x The Lord Pt. 3"	2:14
9.	"Prone!"	2:06
10.	"A Beauty"	0:37
11.	"Life's Hard, Here's a Song About Sorrel"	1:04
12.	"Thot Tactics"	2:51
13.	"Free the Frail"	3:03
14.	"Quicksand"	0:29
15.	"Pre Verified Lifestyle"	1:59
16.	"Post Verified Lifestyle"	2:28
17.	"**** in the Pit"	3:24
18.	"BasicBitchTearGas" (USB Mix)	2:38
19.	"DOTS Freestyle"	2:08
20.	"Buttermilk Jesus Type Beat"	1:09
21.	"Papi I Missed U"	4:02
22.	"SUB / Untitled (Country Song)"	5:00
Total length:		57:07

Notes

- "JPEGMafia Type Beat", "Prone!", "DOTS Freestyle Remix" and "Buttermilk Jesus Type Beat" are stylized in all caps.
- On the Bandcamp and vinyl releases, "Papi I Missed U" is listed as "🥺".
- On the vinyl release, "Grimy Waifu" is listed as "Grimey Waifu", "BasicBitchTearGas" is listed as "BabyBeamerBoy", and "DOTS Freestyle Remix" is listed as "DOTS Freestyle Remix x Make Me Cry".
- On the Bandcamp release and the limited USB edition, an updated version of "Jesus Forgive Me, I Am a Thot" contains an extended outro, changing its length to 3:03.
- On the limited USB edition, "BasicBitchTearGas" has been extended, changing its length to 2:40.

Sample credits

- ^{^[a]} "BasicBitchTearGas" contains an interpolation of "No Scrubs", by TLC.

== Personnel ==
Credits adapted from Bandcamp and JPEGMafia's website.

- JPEGMafia – vocals, production, mixing, mastering (all tracks), engineering, all instruments (tracks 1, 3, 6, 8, 9, 12–18), keyboards (track 5), bass (track 7), drums (tracks 7, 10), guitar (track 5), drum programming (track 5)
- Buzzy Lee – flute (track 5), featured vocals (track 16)
- Vegyn – co-production, guitar, piano, additional vocals (track 7), vinyl design
- Young Emoji – additional vocals (tracks 9, 10, 12–14)
- Refined Sugar – additional vocals (track 9)
- Helena Deland – featured vocals (track 13)
- Abdu Ali – featured vocals (track 16)
- Alec Marchant – artwork design, photography
- Isha Dipika Walia – vinyl design
- George Edge – assistant vinyl design

== Charts ==
Chart (2019–2020)	Peak position
Canadian Albums (Billboard)	94
Irish Albums (IRMA)	86
Lithuanian Albums (AGATA)	37
UK Album Downloads (Official Charts)	97
UK R&B Albums (OCC)	29
UK Record Store Chart	24
US Billboard 200	105
US Independent Albums (Billboard)	17
US & Canadian College Radio Top 200 (NACC)	22
