= Veteran (JPEGMafia album) =

Studio album by JPEGMafia
- Released: January 19, 2018
- Recorded: 2015–2017
- Studios: JPEGMafia's home studio; The Bell Foundry
- Genres: Experimental hip-hop; industrial hip-hop; trap
- Length: 47:13
- Label: Republic
- Producer: JPEGMafia

JPEGMafia chronology
Black Ben Carson (2016)	Veteran (2018)	All My Heroes Are Cornballs (2019)

Alternative cover
- Veteran: Director's Cut and Bandcamp cover.

Singles from Veteran
- 1. "Baby I'm Bleeding" Released: December 1, 2017

Veteran is the second studio album by American rapper JPEGMafia. It was released on January 19, 2018 by Republic Records. A music video for "Baby I'm Bleeding" was released on December 1, 2017. A second video for "Real Nega" was released on May 18, 2018. On September 12, 2018, a video for "1539 N. Calvert" was released. The album was released to widespread critical acclaim and was featured in numerous year-end lists; in 2019, Pitchfork listed it at number 171 in their list of best albums of the decade.

== Recording ==
Most of Veteran was recorded while JPEGMafia was living in Baltimore and was mixed and mastered when he moved to Los Angeles in mid 2017. He recorded around 120 songs and set aside 19 for the album. The album was originally intended to be released on 22 October 2017, his 28th birthday. JPEGMafia attributed the album's aggressive and chaotic nature to "other shit" he experienced in Baltimore, and was able to fully understand it when he became level-headed in Los Angeles.

JPEGMafia calls Veteran an exercise in editing, in that there were a lot of moments he took out and some that almost didn't make it, and that he "reeled it back" more on Veteran compared to earlier records. "Libtard Anthem" originally featured JPEGMafia doing a verse, but removed himself from the song in favor for Freaky's guest verse because he felt that "he summed it up perfectly". "Dayum" was originally much longer, consisting of 3 different beats that he made, before being edited down to 1 minute 26 seconds because it was "not needed". "I Cannot Fucking Wait Until Morrissey Dies" was also much longer, with "an intro and a whole other part" before being whittled down to 1 minute 27 seconds.

== Music and lyrics ==
Matthew Moyer of Orlando Weekly labeled Veteran as the most freeform hip-hop album ever, even more so than the works of Death Grips and clipping. The instrumentals are an amalgam of noise and glitch styles in the vein of Tigerbeat6 and Mille Plateaux, as well as punk rap, noise rap, trap, and "space-age R&B". JPEGMafia's vocal performance is mostly abrasive but ranges from aggressive to calm to crooning. These alterations happen abruptly all within "Thug Tears", beginning with the rapper singing, then rapping in staccato notes before rapping smoothly and singing again. Turner notes that the "goofy production keeps the record from same navel-gazing mythologizing".

Veteran continues JPEGMafia's trend of referencing elements of popular culture, political and social issues, which he considers a presentation of an internet-dominated era. Critics described the album's "dissonance", "lithe sexuality", rage, and "jaded indifference" as an "incisive, contradictory, sometimes sarcastic" manifesto on the "jarring" state of the United States' social climate, specifically the "monstrous, Twitter-shit spirit of 2018" by a man mentally on the edge. Analyzed by Paul A. Thompson of Pitchfork, the rapper borrows the evocative language of artists like MC Ren, Ice Cube, and Eazy-E, and brings in the irony and bad-faith argumentation of usual internet discussion. Topics include political unrest, feminism, hipsterism ("Real Nega"), the flaws of liberalism ("Libtard Anthem"), and gentrification ("Whole Foods", "Williamsburg"). The lyrics reference video games, anime, Rudy Giuliani, Tomi Lahren, WWE, MAGA, and The X-Files. Individuals and institutions lambasted on the record include online critics, publications such as Dead End Hip Hop and Pitchfork, the alt-right, Whole Foods Market, neoliberals, Morrissey, SoundCloud rappers, Bill Maher, and Kellyanne Conway.

Michael Cyrs wrote, JPEGMafia exudes "a modern grace without attempting to care about everything all the time"; this is best evidenced on "My Thoughts on NeoGAF Dying", where JPEGMafia repeatedly states "I don't care" over a hazy instrumental, presenting his disinterest in any scandal covered in the news. On "Rock N Roll Is Dead", the rapper, in expressing his distrust of the mainstream press, threatens to "put hands on a blogger" and "make 'em beg for his life". He also shows himself as unafraid to confront the threat of fascism on "Real Nega": "Alt-right want war, well that's fine then." On "Williamsburg", JPEGMafia condemns the gentrification of his hometown of Brooklyn over a beat with a sound reflecting the cold and empty feeling of the economic trend; he argues that he is "selling art to these yuppies" and makes fun of the wealthy's penchant for overpriced coffee and Phoenix Suns shirts.

== Artwork and title ==
Veteran refers to his years in the United States Air Force and his life experience in the southern part of the country. Multiple cover artworks were done for Veteran, one of which is the rapper's Louisiana driver's license, which references the food stamp cover for Ol' Dirty Bastard's Return to the 36 Chambers: The Dirty Version (1995).

== Critical reception ==
Although JPEGMafia had been rapping and producing beats since he was 15, Veteran was considered to be his breakthrough album. It was met with widespread acclaim from critics. Thompson, in his 7.7/10 review for Pitchfork, praised the album as "a remarkable exercise in sound and texture", reasoning that it "takes white-hot riffs and the most distasteful parts of our national politics, chops them up, and somehow scatters them perfectly into place". He felt the record's best moments "makes the frayed edges of each element part of the atmosphere, a mess of distortion that works percussively and melodically". He also highlighted the moments of soul music sampling, describing it as placing the sampling of New York rap "in a late-2010s internet wasteland".

Publication	Accolade	Rank	Ref.
NME	The Albums of the Year 2018	68	
Noisey	The 100 Best Albums of 2018	41	
Pitchfork	Top 50 Albums of 2018	37	
Pitchfork	The 200 Best Albums of the 2010s	171	
The Quietus	100 Best Albums of 2018	78	
Rolling Stone	The 30 Best Hip-Hop Albums of 2018	20	
Spin	The 51 Best Albums of 2018	24	
The 405	The Top 50 Albums of 2018	7	

== Track listing ==
All tracks written, produced, mixed and mastered by JPEGMafia.

Veteran track listing
No.	Title	Length
1.	"1539 N. Calvert"	2:37
2.	"Real Nega"	2:31
3.	"Thug Tears"	3:18
4.	"Dayum"	1:25
5.	"Baby I'm Bleeding"	2:32
6.	"My Thoughts on Neogaf Dying"	1:34
7.	"Rock N Roll Is Dead"	3:08
8.	"DD Form 214" (featuring Bobbi Rush)	3:15
9.	"Germs"	2:41
10.	"Libtard Anthem" (performed by Freaky)	1:20
11.	"Panic Emoji"	3:00
12.	"DJ Snitch Bitch Interlude"	1:23
13.	"Whole Foods"	2:04
14.	"Macaulay Culkin"	1:57
15.	"Williamsburg"	3:33
16.	"I Cannot Fucking Wait Til Morrissey Dies"	1:26
17.	"Rainbow Six" (featuring Yung Midpack)	4:43
18.	"1488"	2:28
19.	"Curb Stomp"	2:15
Total length:		47:13

Veteran: Director's Cut track listing
No.	Title	Length
1.	"Does This Ski Mask Make Me Look Fat?" (featuring Heno.)	4:27
2.	"This Song Is a Safe Space" (featuring Black Sheep Refugees & Freaky)	6:44
3.	"Starcade 97" (featuring Datpiffmafia)	3:52
4.	"Man Purse"	3:23
5.	"Free XXX and Teanna"	3:08
6.	"Millenium Freestyle"	3:10
Total length:		24:44

Notes

- On the Bandcamp and vinyl releases, "Panic Emoji" is listed as "😱".
- The streaming versions of the album has the features uncredited, while the Bandcamp & SoundCloud versions credits them. However, on the Director's Cut, the track "Free XXX and Teanna" contains uncredited vocals by Dyyo Faccina.
- "Real Nega" contains a sample of "Goin' Down" by Ol' Dirty Bastard.
- "Thug Tears" contains a sample from The Matrix
- "Williamsburg" contains a sample of "Butterfly Effect" by Travis Scott.
- "Millenium Freestyle" contains an interpolation of "I Want It That Way" by Backstreet Boys and "My Boo" by the Ghost Town DJ's.

== Charts ==
Chart performance for Veteran
Chart (2024)	Peak position
UK Independent Albums Breakers (OCC)	13
UK R&B Albums (Official Charts)	9
UK Record Store (OCC)	30
