= EP2! =

EP by JPEGMafia
- Released: February 12, 2021
- Recorded: May–June 2020
- Studio: JPEGMafia's home studio
- Genres: Alternative R&B; alternative hip-hop
- Length: 17:40
- Label: Republic
- Producers: JPEGMafia; James Blake

JPEGMafia chronology
EP! (2020)	EP2! (2021)	LP! (2021)

Singles from EP2!
- 1. "Last Dance!" Released: August 31, 2020; 2. "Fix Urself!" Released: January 29, 2021

Professional ratings
Review scores
Source	Rating
Clash	7/10
Loud and Quiet	8/10
NME	4/5 stars

EP2! is the fifth extended play by American rapper and producer JPEGMafia, released February 12, 2021 on Republic Records. It is the follow-up to EP!, a compilation of singles he released throughout 2020. EP2! was supported by two singles: "Last Dance!" and "Fix Urself!".

== Background ==
JPEGMafia released several singles across the span of 2020, and compiled them into an EP, aptly titled EP!. It was released on his Bandcamp page on November 6, and on streaming services with the addition of one extra single on December 10. Shortly after the release, he announced EP2! on his Twitter account calling it "triumphant introvert music".

The EP was recorded May or June 2020 "around the time when people were posting black squares" over the course of three weeks, with him saying on Twitter "no samples I just locked myself in a room with a few synthesizers. 3 weeks top to bottom".

== Release and promotion ==
The first single to release was "Last Dance!" on August 31, 2020, calling it the "final one". It did not appear on the track listing for EP!, suggesting it was going to release on a different project. On January 29, 2021, he released the single "Fix Urself!" accompanied by a music video. On February 5, he officially announced the release date and track listing. The album released February 12, 2021 and was supported by a YouTube livestream of a pre-recorded performance of the EP, along with a Q&A session afterwards where he answered questions from fans.

== Track listing ==
All tracks written and produced by JPEGMafia, except "Panic Room", produced by JPEGMafia and James Blake.

No.	Title	Length
1.	"Last Dance!"	2:17
2.	"Intro!"	0:44
3.	"Fix Urself!"	3:07
4.	"Keltec!"	3:04
5.	"This Ones for Us!"	3:04
6.	"Panic Room!"	2:28
7.	"Feed Her!"	2:56
Total length:		17:40

Notes

- All titles are stylized in all caps.
- The Bandcamp version of the EP has "Intro!" and "Fix Urself" combined into one track.
