= Black Ben Carson =

2016 album by JPEGMAFIA

Studio album by JPEGMafia
- Released: February 15, 2016
- Genres: Experimental hip-hop; political hip-hop
- Length: 72:39
- Label: Self-Released
- Producer: JPEGMafia

JPEGMafia chronology
Darkskin Manson (2015)	Black Ben Carson (2016)	The 2nd Amendment (2016)

Black Ben Carson (stylized in all lowercase) is the debut studio album by American rapper JPEGMafia. It was self-released on February 15, 2016. The album was supported by the three singles "You Think You Know", "I Smell Crack" and "Digital Blackface". Black Ben Carson was named after the only Black candidate from the two major parties in the 2016 US presidential election, Ben Carson, who was running as a Republican.

The album was split into two sides; Side A being "hip hop in its rawest form – loud, angry, political, and self-aware" and Side B with a more introspective, mellow and calm sound.

The tracklist was later changed to single disc consisting of 19 tracks.

Black Ben Carson was named the best Baltimore album of 2016 by the Baltimore City Paper.

== Track listing ==
All tracks are produced, written, mixed & mastered by JPEGMafia.

Black Ben Carson track listing
No.	Title	Length
1.	"Drake Era"	3:57
2.	"All Caps No Spaces"	4:06
3.	"Digital Blackface"	3:43
4.	"Cuck"	2:48
5.	"I Smell Crack"	2:23
6.	"You Think You Know"	3:23
7.	"Motor Mouth"	4:26
8.	"Black Ben Carson"	4:02
9.	"Black Steve Austin"	2:18
10.	"Black Stacey Dash"	2:52
11.	"What's Crackin'"	4:58
12.	"I Just Killed a Cop Now I'm Horny"	5:53
13.	"Plastic"	3:04
14.	"Boi" (featuring Butch Dawson)	4:29
15.	"The 27 Club"	3:56
16.	"Face Down Ass Up" (featuring Bito, Kente and Freaky)	4:29
17.	"This That Shit Kid Cudi Coulda Been"	4:07
18.	"2015 Was a Great Year"	2:50
19.	"Try Me"	4:55
Total length:		72:39

=== Sample credits ===
- "What's Crackin'" samples "Inside the Mattress" by Future, and interpolates "Itz Crackin" by Chief Keef
