= JPEGMafia =

American rapper and record producer (born 1989)

JPEGMAFIA
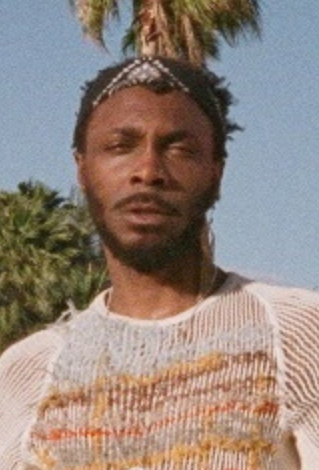
- JPEGMafia in 2021

Background information
- Also known as: Devon Hendryx; Peggy
- Born: Barrington DeVaughn Hendricks; October 22, 1989 (age 37); New York City, U.S.
- Origin: Baltimore, Maryland, U.S.
- Genres: Experimental hip-hop; alternative hip-hop; industrial hip-hop; psychedelic rap; alternative R&B
- Occupations: Rapper; singer; songwriter; record producer
- Works: JPEGMafia discography
- Years active: 2007–present
- Labels: Republic; AWAL; EQT
- Website: jpegmafia.net

Barrington DeVaughn Hendricks (born October 22, 1989), known professionally as JPEGMafia (stylized in all caps), is an American rapper, singer, and record producer. Born in Flatbush, Brooklyn, he released his debut studio album, Black Ben Carson (2016) independently as well as his second album Veteran (2018), which received widespread critical acclaim. His third album, All My Heroes Are Cornballs (2019) entered the Billboard 200, and had signed to Republic for the release of his fourth album LP! (2021); both were met with continued critical acclaim. In 2023, he released his collaborative studio album Scaring the Hoes (2023) through AWAL. In 2024, he released his fifth studio album I Lay Down My Life for You (2024). On May 21, 2026, he released his sixth studio album Experimental Rap.

== Early life ==
Barrington DeVaughn Hendricks was born October 22, 1989, in the Flatbush neighborhood of Brooklyn to Jamaican parents. He spent the majority of his childhood in East Flatbush. He moved to Alabama at the age of 13, where he experienced a significant amount of racism that would later influence his music.

Hendricks attended high school in Louisiana, where he enlisted himself in the United States Air Force at age 18. He served a tour of duty in the midst of the Iraq War and also spent time in Kuwait, Germany, Japan, and North Africa. After speaking up against his superiors' reported abuse, Hendricks was honorably discharged.

== Career ==
=== 2009–2014: Early work and career beginnings ===
At the age of 15, Hendricks developed an interest in music production as he began producing after learning how to sample. Describing his production, Hendricks said "When I was first making beats, no one liked the beats. I used to give people beats and they're just confused.", noting that "I started rapping because no one liked my beats at the time." Noting that he started producing before he started rapping, Hendricks said "I'm a producer first, rapper second but I take both of them seriously."

While living between in Okinawa Prefecture and Tokyo, he was producing and writing music under the moniker Devon Hendryx. Mixtapes being released under the name, including Dreamcast Summer Songs, Generation Y, JoeChillWorld, The Rockwood Escape Plan and The Ghost~Pop Tape.

=== 2015–2017: Name change and Black Ben Carson ===
In early 2015, Hendricks returned to the U.S. and moved to Baltimore, Maryland, where he began to make and release music under his moniker of JPEGMafia. Under the new name, he would release his first mixtape, Communist Slow Jams, in April 2015. Just a month later, he released his second mixtape, Darkskin Manson, a tape that was inspired by the Freddie Gray protests in Baltimore. Following a number of mixtapes, Hendricks released his debut studio album, Black Ben Carson, independently in February 2016, which features a much harsher and more distorted sound than his other projects. Four months later, he released a collaborative extended play with fellow Baltimore-based rapper Freaky, titled The 2nd Amendment.

=== 2018–2019: Veteran and All My Heroes Are Cornballs ===
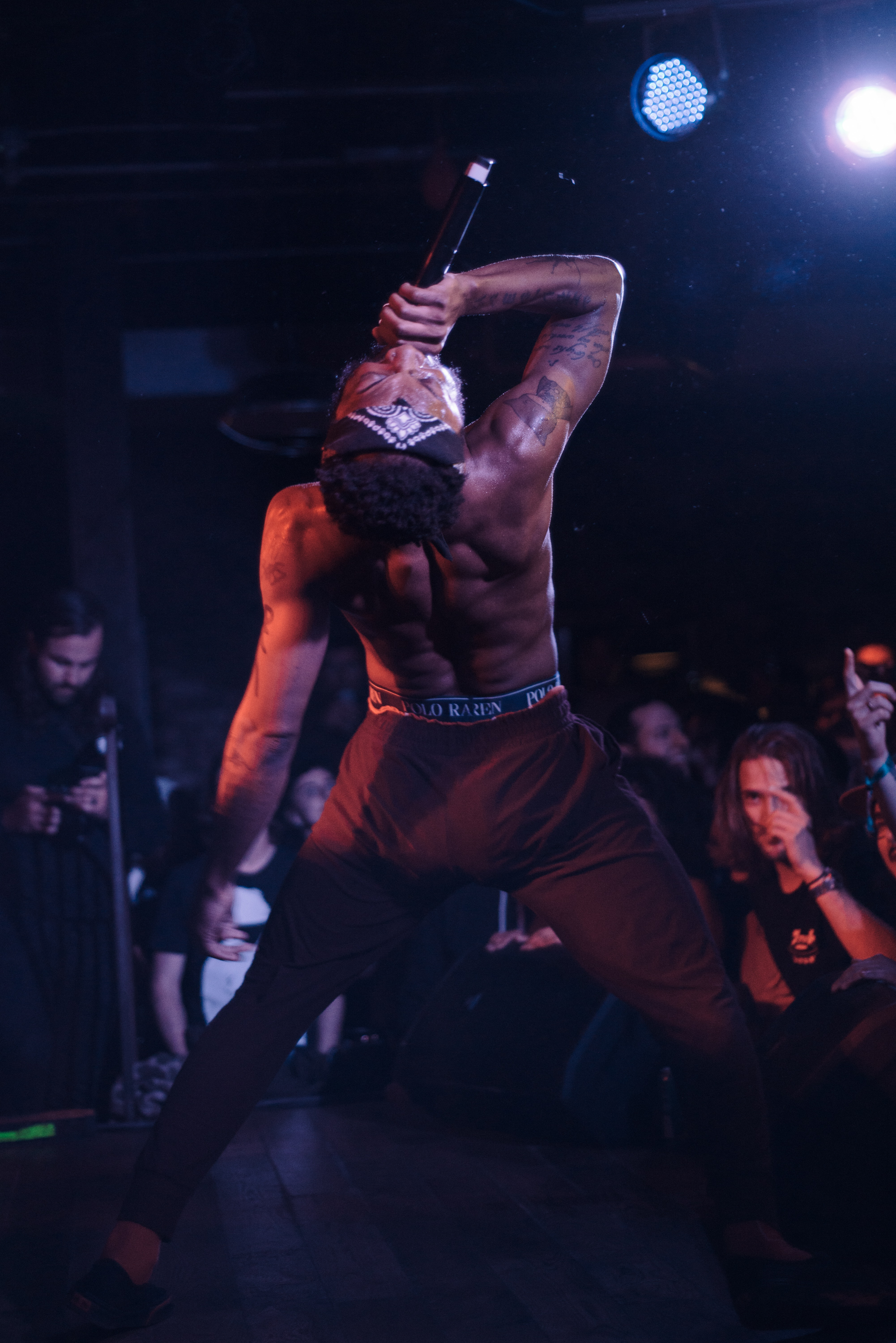
Hendricks performing at the 2019 Sled Island festival in Calgary, Alberta.

After three years of living in Baltimore, Hendricks moved to Los Angeles, California into finishing his-then upcoming and untitled second studio album. In January 2018, he released his second studio album, titled Veteran. In an article on Bandcamp, he said "I wanted to show I'm not just a one-trick pony. I always do weird shit. I usually just keep it to myself. This time, I just let the filter go." At the time of its release, Veteran was considered JPEGMafia's most experimental album to date, receiving widespread critical acclaim. On June 3, 2025, Hendricks would announce the "Director's Cut" for Veteran, which released on streaming services on June 6. The album contains 6 new bonus songs that were previously singles or on the Not on Veteran! SoundCloud compilation. It also contains instrumentals on the CD and vinyl release.

Today, the master tracks for Veteran return to me. This is a privilege most artists do not get—the privilege of owning your work. This album changed my life forever. Without it, I would've never had the chance to showcase my experimental talents to the world. Some people cry like hoes when they have to acknowledge something from their past—but thankfully, I possess none of these lame tendencies. My albums are my children. I said this in 2019, and I meant it. So, in celebration of my second child coming home from war, I've made a special edition of the Veteran vinyl: The Director's Cut. Enjoy this edition. The next time I acknowledge this child publicly, I will remaster him.

— JPEGMafia on the release of Veteran: The Director's Cut

After the release of Veteran, Hendricks started working on his next album. He recorded 93 songs and whittled it down to 18 tracks. He mixed and mastered it at the end of Vince Staples' tour, posting percentage updates frequently on his Instagram. Prior to the release, he would label the project as a "disappointment" in interviews and his social media. The first single from the album, "Jesus Forgive Me, I Am a Thot", was released on August 13, 2019. He promoted the album by uploading a series of listening sessions to his YouTube channel where friends and artists such as Denzel Curry, Jeff Tweedy (of Wilco) and Hannibal Buress discussed and reacted to cuts off of the album. All My Heroes Are Cornballs was released on September 13, 2019, to further critical acclaim, and was his first album to chart. In October 2019, he embarked on the JPEGMafia Type Tour to support his new album.

=== 2020–2023: EP!, EP2! and LP! ===
In 2020, Hendricks released several singles across the span of the year and compiled them into an extended play, aptly titled EP!. It was released on Hendricks's Bandcamp page on November 7, and on streaming services with the addition of one extra single on December 10. On February 12, 2021, Hendricks released his third extended play, EP2!. Hendricks released his fourth album, titled LP!, on October 22, 2021, the same day as his birthday, to further acclaim. Due to sample-related issues, the album was released as two separate versions: LP! released on streaming services, and LP! (Offline) (the original version) released for free on Bandcamp, YouTube, and SoundCloud with more songs. On February 24, 2022, Hendricks announced via Twitter that the songs not on the "Online" version had been released to streaming services as the extended play, titled Offline!. On May 23, 2023, Hendricks released the complete "Offline" version of the album to streaming platforms.

=== 2023–present: Scaring the Hoes, I Lay Down My Life for You and Experimental Rap ===
On January 15, 2023, Hendricks made a hint on his social media that he was working on a collaborative project with fellow rapper, Danny Brown. On January 20, 2023, Hendricks officially announced three albums will be dropping the same year. On February 10, 2023, Hendricks announced on his Twitter that the collaborative project with Danny Brown was finished, and was working on his second album for the year. On February 28, 2023, on The Danny Brown Show, both Hendricks and Brown announced that their collaborative project was named 'Scaring the Hoes Vol. 1', and played a sneak peek of the first single on the project. On March 13, 2023, the first single of the project called "Lean Beef Patty" was released to streaming services, and Hendricks announced that the collaborative project was set to release on March 24, 2023. The second single "Scaring the Hoes" was released to streaming services along with a music video. Three days later, the album was released. On July 11, 2023, an EP of songs that did not make the cut for the album titled, Scaring the Hoes: DLC Pack, which includes four tracks, was released on streaming services.

He wrote and produced on the tracks "Stars", "Fuk Sumn", "Beg Forgiveness", and "King" from ¥$'s album Vultures 1 which was released on February 10, 2024. One of the deluxe editions of Vultures 1's follow-up record Vultures 2 features the track "Believer", which was written and produced by Hendricks.

In preparation for his album, titled I Lay Down My Life for You (revealed via Hendricks's Instagram), he released the singles "Don't Rely on Other Men" and "Sin Miedo" as well as announced the "Lay Down My Life" world tour with RXKNephew as the opening act. I Lay Down My Life for You was released on August 1, 2024. The deluxe edition of the album, titled I Lay Down My Life for You: Director's Cut, was released on February 3, 2025. The "Director's Cut" edition includes 14 new tracks (originally planned to be 13, an extra was added to make up for the three-day delay in its release) and rearranges the existing track list. Despite Hendricks stating that the "Director's Cut" was the "original vision" for the album, it has multiple references to Luigi Mangione, who began garnering significant media attention after the album had already released as well as themes of suicide and depression.

On April 24, 2025, previous collaborator Flume previewed a collaboration track with Hendricks, titled "Track 1", on YouTube. Three days later, both Hendricks and Brown confirmed that Scaring the Hoes, Vol. 2 was in the works. Shortly after the announcement, both Hendricks and Flume announced a collaborative EP titled We Live in a Society, which was released on May 2, 2025. Hendricks co-wrote the song "Fya" for K-pop group BTS's album Arirang, released on March 20, 2026.

Hendricks released his sixth album, Experimental Rap, on May 21, 2026. He also announced The Experimental Rap Tour, a North American tour set to take place between September and October 2026. The tour will be supported by Redveil and Matt Proxy. Hendricks produced Maxo Kream's June 2026 album O.Y.N.

== Artistry ==
Hendricks' music has mostly been described as experimental hip-hop, but he has also incorporated a wide range of genres into his music such as trap, R&B, vaporwave, noise rap, and rock.

In an interview with Cambridge Union, Hendricks noted that his biggest influence was Kanye West. He states that one of his earliest influences was the rock group Hanson. He has also cited Ol' Dirty Bastard, Throbbing Gristle, Skinny Puppy, MF Doom, Lil B, SpaceGhostPurrp, Danny Brown, Chief Keef, Ice Cube, Rick Rubin, Cam'ron, Björk, Janelle Monáe, Radiohead, and Dirty Beaches as influences.

In his lyrics, Hendricks touches on themes such as racism, police brutality, and his own experiences in life as a black creative. His lyrics also often critique the current state of rap music and global politics.

== In other media ==
In March 2020, Hendricks started a vlog series on his YouTube channel called HTBAR (How To Build A Relationship). The series features JPEGMafia talking to other artists and friends about various topics, mostly about music, life and politics. Each episode's soundtrack consist of unreleased songs, demos and instrumentals produced by JPEGMafia. Artists that have featured on the vlog series include Danny Brown, Kenny Beats, Lykke Li, Orville Peck, Saba and more. Hendricks has also appeared on The Cave, a YouTube series created by hip-hop producer Kenny Beats.

Hendricks is a fan of professional wrestling, and has incorporated several references to it in his songs. He made an appearance for wrestling promotion All Elite Wrestling (AEW) on an episode of their television show AEW Dynamite in September 2020. In 2021, AEW star Darby Allin was featured on Hendricks's thirteenth HTBAR episode.

Hendricks appeared on the 7th episode of season 5 of The Eric Andre Show, and competed in the third Rapper Warrior Ninja sketch—a parody of the TV show Sasuke (which aired in the United States of America under the title Ninja Warrior) and its American spin-off American Ninja Warrior. Hendricks competed along with Lil Yachty, Murs, Trippie Redd, and Zack Fox in a challenge to cross a platform while freestyling and dodging various attacks.

== Personal life ==
In a 2019 interview with Highsnobiety, Hendricks shared that: "I was raised kind of religious, but I'm not a religious person—I think a lot of black people grow up in religious households whether they like to or not."

Hendricks lives in Los Angeles.

== Discography ==
Studio albums

- Black Ben Carson (2016)
- Veteran (2018)
- All My Heroes Are Cornballs (2019)
- LP! (2021)
- I Lay Down My Life for You (2024)
- Experimental Rap (2026)

Collaborative albums

- Scaring the Hoes (with Danny Brown) (2023)
