= Daveed Diggs =

American actor and rapper (born 1982)

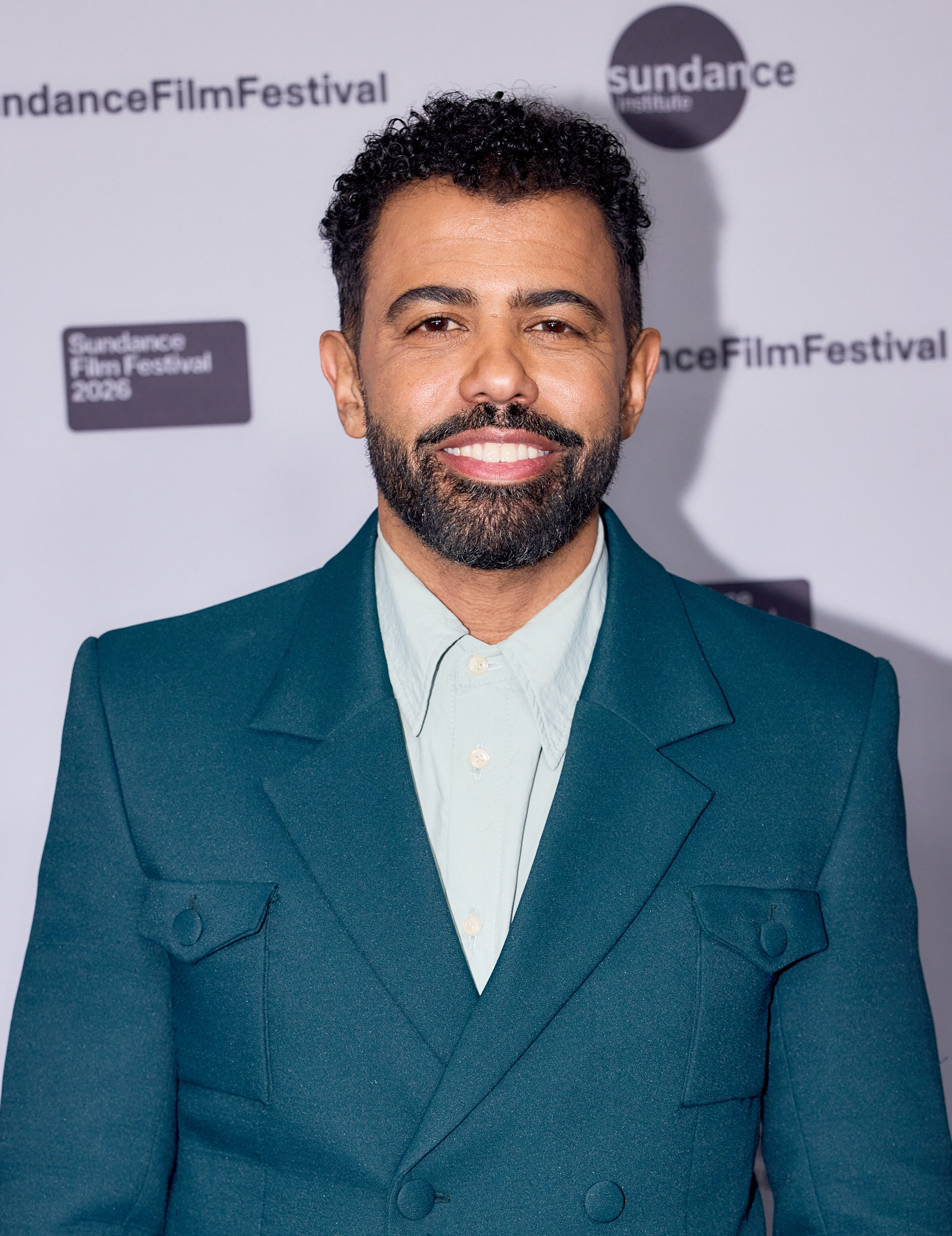
- Diggs at the 2026 Sundance Film Festival
- Born: Daveed Daniele Diggs; January 24, 1982 (age 44); Oakland, California, U.S.
- Education: Brown University (BA)
- Occupations: Actor; rapper; singer; songwriter; screenwriter; film producer
- Years active: 2003–present
- Partner: Emmy Raver-Lampman (2015-present)
- Children: 1
- Musical career
- Genres: Experimental hip hop; industrial hip hop; noise; pop rock; R&B; funk
- Instrument: Vocals
- Labels: Sub Pop; Deathbomb Arc
- Member of: clipping.
- Website: daveeddiggs.com

Daveed Daniele Diggs (born January 24, 1982) is an American actor, rapper, and singer-songwriter. He is the vocalist of the experimental hip hop group Clipping. In 2015, he originated the dual roles of Marquis de Lafayette and Thomas Jefferson in the musical Hamilton, for which he won a 2016 Tony Award for Best Actor in a Featured Role in a Musical. Along with the main cast of Hamilton, he was awarded a Grammy Award for Best Musical Theater Album in the same year. He portrayed Aaron/Oh Father in the superhero series The Boys (2026).

Since leaving Hamilton, he played a recurring role in the television series Black-ish (2016–2022) and co-starred in the films Wonder (2017) and Velvet Buzzsaw (2019). Diggs also wrote, produced, and starred in the 2018 film Blindspotting, which earned him a nomination for the Independent Spirit Award for Best Male Lead; he acted as creator, writer, and executive producer on the 2021 spin-off sequel television series Blindspotting, in which he also reprised his role as a guest. From 2020 to 2024, he starred in the television adaptation of Snowpiercer. In 2021, he received a nomination for a Primetime Emmy Award for Outstanding Actor in a Supporting Role in a Limited Series or Movie for his performance in the Disney+ live stage recording of Hamilton which was released in 2020, and won a Children's and Family Emmy Award as an executive producer on the sports drama series The Crossover (2023).

His voice acting career includes Ferdinand (2017), Soul (2020), DC League of Super-Pets (2022), The Little Mermaid (2023), and Trolls Band Together (2023).

== Early life and education ==
Diggs was born in Oakland, California, the son of Barbara, a social worker, and Dountes Diggs, a bus driver. His mother is Jewish, and his father is African-American. His parents named him "Daveed", the Hebrew pronunciation of David. Diggs has said, "'David' means beloved in Hebrew... They spelled it with two Es because my dad liked the look of it." His parents' ethnic and racial identities have contributed to his own self-identification: "The cultures never seemed separate—I had a lot of mixed friends. When I was young, I identified with being Jewish, but I embraced my dad's side too."

Diggs is an alumnus of Berkeley High School and Brown University, where he graduated in 2004 with a bachelor's degree in theatre arts. He was recruited by Brown for his track skills and broke the Brown Bears' school record in the 110-meter hurdles as a sophomore with a time of 14.21 seconds. After graduating, he worked as a substitute teacher.

== Career ==
=== Theater ===
Diggs performed in experimental theater early in his career, most notably when he was on the national tour for Marc Bamuthi Joseph's choreopoem, Word Becomes Flesh, about a nine-month pregnancy through the eyes of a young, single father. He also frequently performed in regional Shakespeare productions.

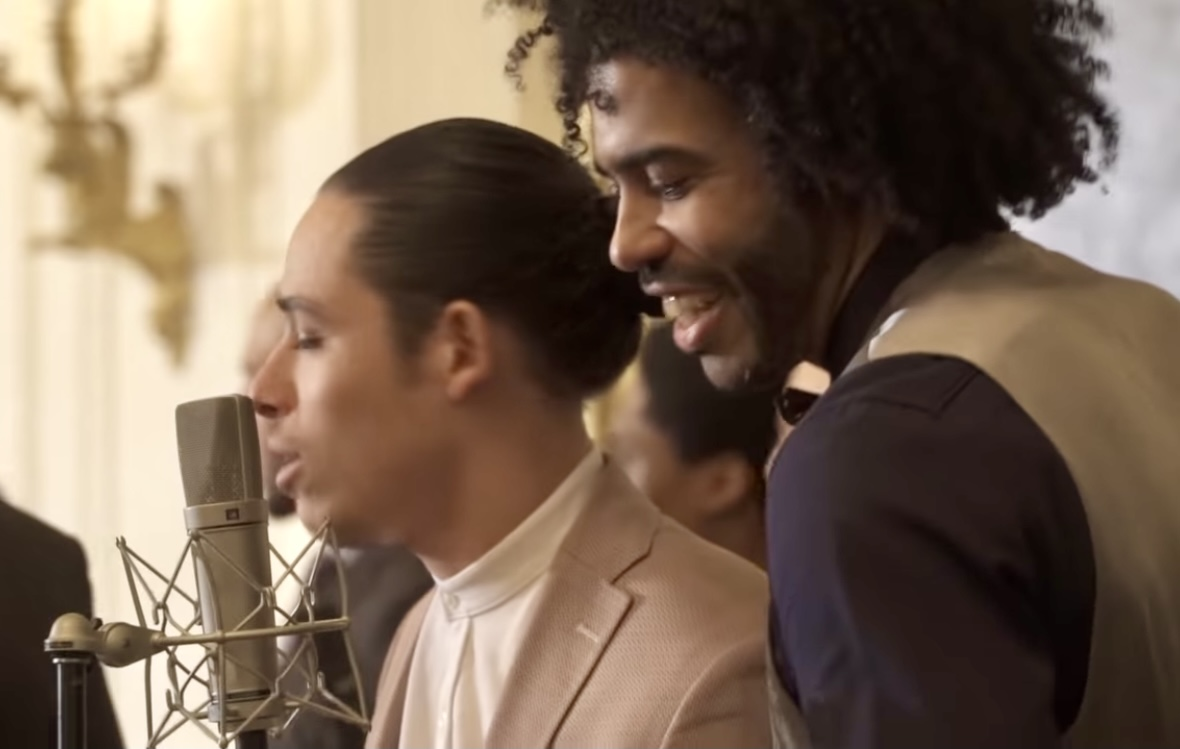
Diggs (right) performs with Hamilton castmates at the White House (2016)

Diggs met playwright, composer, actor, and rapper Lin-Manuel Miranda through Thomas Kail while performing with the freestyle rap group Freestyle Love Supreme, or FLS. In 2012, Miranda invited Diggs to read and hear early versions of Hamilton. Diggs was impressed by Miranda's demos and passion for the project, and saw that the concept was a prospective use of the rap-musical medium. He played the roles of Thomas Jefferson and Marquis de Lafayette off Broadway in 2015, continuing with the roles when the show was moved to Broadway later in the year. For his performance, Diggs won the 2016 Tony Award for Best Featured Actor in a Musical, as well as a 2016 Grammy Award for the cast album. Diggs played his final performance in the show on July 15, 2016.

=== Music ===
Diggs is the vocalist of and writer for the experimental hip-hop and rap group clipping. The group was founded by William Hutson and Jonathan Snipes in 2009, with Diggs joining in 2010. The trio self-released their first mixtape album midcity in 2013 to fairly positive reviews. Signing with Sub Pop, they released their album CLPPNG in 2014, which they promoted with their CLPPNG Tour. In 2016, they released an EP titled Wriggle, then the album Splendor & Misery. In 2017, they released The Deep, a five-and-a-half minute track that tells the story of a society of the descendants of the enslaved living underwater. In 2018, the song was nominated for a Hugo Award for Best Dramatic Presentation (Short Form). In 2019, they released an album titled There Existed an Addiction to Blood; additionally, in 2020, the group released the album Visions of Bodies Being Burned.

Diggs is a member of True Neutral Crew, with Brian Kinsman, Margot Padilla, and Signor Benedick the Moor. The group has released two EPs, #MONSANTO (2013) and 2014's #POPPUNK, as well as Live, a 20-minute short film of a live performance. They released their debut album soft rules in 2016.

In 2010, he made an album with Rafael Casal titled The BAY BOY Mixtape. Diggs also founded a hip hop triumvirate with Chinaka Hodge and Casal known as The Getback. The Getback later became a collaborative ensemble composed of Diggs, Hodge, Casal and other artists along with a band formed by drummer Chukwudi Hodge, turntablist Dion Decibels and Max Miller-Logan on trumpet and Keys. Though the band have diversified themselves from their work with the ensemble, they are still known as The GetBack (Get:Band) on Facebook. Two years later, in 2012, he released his first solo rap album, Small Things to a Giant, composed of original music he had written. Both The BAY BOY Mixtape and Small Things to a Giant included other artists in The Getback collective.

He is also a member of Lin-Manuel Miranda and Thomas Kail's freestyle rap group Freestyle Love Supreme, or FLS, which performs across the country.

His rapping has also been featured on tracks by Busdriver, George Watsky, Rafael Casal, and Leslie Odom, Jr., and he wrote and performed a rap number for the 2016 animated film Zootopia.

In December 2020, Diggs, along with lifelong friends William Hutson and Johnathan Snipes, partnered with Disney Channel to produce a festive song for Hanukkah. The released track, titled "Puppy for Hanukkah", is described by Disney Music and Soundtracks V.P. Steven Vincent as "inventive, humorous, and relevant".

=== Television ===
Diggs has had recurring roles on the series The Get Down, Black-ish, and Unbreakable Kimmy Schmidt. He also appeared in an episode of Law & Order: Special Victims Unit.

Diggs served as an executive producer of the 2017 ABC series The Mayor. In addition, he wrote original music for it, as well as guest starring on it. Starting in early 2017, Diggs played one of Mr. Noodle's brothers, Mr. Noodle, in the "Elmo's World" segment of Sesame Street.

In early 2018, Diggs was featured in several television commercials for the Zelle digital payment service.

In 2020, he began starring in the TNT television adaptation of Snowpiercer. He also starred as Frederick Douglass in the Showtime miniseries The Good Lord Bird.

In September 2020, it was confirmed that the critically acclaimed Casal and Diggs written film Blindspotting would be spun-off as a comedy-drama series Blindspotting, with Diggs set to write and executive produce. Blindspotting the TV series, follows Ashley Rose, portrayed by Jasmine Cephas Jones both in the film and show, as she navigates life after longtime partner Miles is unexpectedly incarcerated. The series was picked up by Lionsgate Television, produced by Dreams with friends Inc. and Snoot Entertainment, and was distributed by Starz. The series had its world premiere at the Tribeca Film Festival on June 11, 2021. The series became available for streaming June 13, 2021, on Starz and StarzPlay. On October 14, 2021, it was announced that the series would be renewed for a second season.

In September 2024, it was announced that Diggs would join the fifth season of the show The Boys, in an undisclosed role later revealed to be Oh Father.

=== Film ===
Diggs had his Hollywood film debut in the Disney animated film Zootopia, for which he wrote and performed the "Parlez Vous Rap".

Diggs appeared in the 2017 film Wonder, starring Julia Roberts and Owen Wilson. Diggs played the schoolteacher of the protagonist, a boy with a facial deformity. Diggs had a voice role in the 2017 animated film Ferdinand, in which he played the character Dos.

Alongside his lifelong friend Rafael Casal, Diggs co-wrote, co-produced, and co-starred in the 2018 film Blindspotting, which premiered at Sundance in January 2018. He received the Atlanta Film Festival's inaugural Innovator Award in April, prior to the film's theatrical release on July 27, 2018. Diggs plays Collin, a felon living in Oakland, as he tries to get through the last three days of his year-long probation without incident. Diggs and Casal wrote the film over nine years to tell a story about their quickly gentrifying hometown as they knew it. Diggs received critical praise for his performance in the film.

Diggs voiced Sebastian in Disney's live-action film The Little Mermaid. The film reunited Diggs with Lin-Manuel Miranda, who co-wrote new songs for the film and also served as a producer.

== Personal life ==
Diggs has one child, a son, with his partner Emmy Raver-Lampman, whom he met in 2015 when they were performing together in Hamilton. Diggs and Raver-Lampman are expecting their second child.

== Filmography ==
=== Film ===
Year	Title	Role	Notes
2010	Rock Hard: The Rise and Fall of Sexual Detergent	Neil Davis	Short film
2012	Yoga Boner	Daveed	Short film
2016	Zootopia	—N/a	Writer and performer: "Parlez-Vous Rap"
2016	Growing Up Wild	Narrator	Documentary
2017	Wonder	Mr. Thomas Browne	
2017	Ferdinand	Dos	Voice
2018	Blindspotting	Collin Hoskins	Also writer and producer
2019	Velvet Buzzsaw	Damrish	
2020	Hamilton	Marquis de Lafayette / Thomas Jefferson	Filmed recording of Broadway musical in 2016
2020	Soul	Paul	Voice
2021	The Starling	Ben	
2022	DC League of Super-Pets	Victor Stone / Cyborg	Voice
2023	The Little Mermaid	Sebastian the Crab	Voice
2023	Trolls Band Together	Spruce / Bruce	Voice
2024	Nickel Boys	Adult Turner	
2025	Magic Hour	Charlie	
2025	Couples Weekend	Josh	
2026	I Want Your Sex	Vikktor	
2026	In the Blink of an Eye	Greg	

=== Television ===
Year	Title	Role	Notes
2014	Hobbes and Me	Hobbes	8 episodes; web series
2015–2016	Law & Order: Special Victims Unit	Counselor Louis Henderson	2 episodes
2016–2017	The Get Down	Adult Ezekiel Figuero	10 episodes
2016–2022	Black-ish	Johan Johnson	11 episodes
2017	Sesame Street	Mr. Noodle's Brother	3 episodes
2017	Unbreakable Kimmy Schmidt	Perry	3 episodes
2017	Tour de Pharmacy	Slim Robinson	Television film
2017	The Mayor	Mac Etcetera	Episode: "Pilot"; also executive producer
2018	BoJack Horseman	Cooper Thomas Rogers Wallace Sr.	Voice, episode: "The Amelia Earhart Story"
2018–2020	Bob's Burgers	Jesse, Douglas	Voice, 2 episodes
2019	Undone	Tunde	Voice, 8 episodes; also motion capture
2019	Green Eggs and Ham	Mouse	Voice, episode: "Mouse"
2019–2020	Star Wars Resistance	Norath Kev	Voice, 4 episodes
2020–2024	Snowpiercer	Andre Layton	Lead role
2020–2022	Central Park	Helen	Voice, main role
2020	The Good Lord Bird	Frederick Douglass	3 episodes
2021	Mixed-ish	Adult Johan	Episode: "Forever Young"
2021–2023	Blindspotting	Collin Hoskins	4 episodes; also creator, writer, and executive producer
2022–2024	Fraggle Rock: Back to the Rock	Jamdolin	Voice, 4 episodes
2022–2024	Star Trek: Prodigy	Commander Tysess	Voice, recurring role
2023	Extrapolations	Marshall Zucker	2 episodes
2023	The Crossover	Narrator	Voice, 8 episodes
2023	Star Wars: Visions	Crux	Voice, episode: "The Pit"
2023	Solar Opposites	Skeletom	Voice, episode: "Down and Out on Planet X-Non"
2023	Krapopolis	Carrots	Voice, episode: "Wife Swamp"
2023	Invincible	Theo, Council Member	Voice, episode: "This Missive, This Machination!"
2023–2025	Moon Girl and Devil Dinosaur	Rat King	Voice, 2 episodes
2026	The Boys	Aaron / Oh Father	Main role (season 5), 8 episodes

=== Theatre ===
Year	Title	Role	Venue
2005	Temptation	Dr. Henry Foustka	Custom Made Theatre Company
2006	Two Rooms	Walker Harris	Custom Made Theatre Company
2006	The Tempest	Ferdinand / Caliban	San Francisco Shakespeare Festival
2007	Jesus Hopped the 'A' Train	Angel Cruz	San Francisco Playhouse
2007	Six Degrees of Separation	Paul	San Francisco Playhouse
2008	Troilus and Cressida	Troilus	Pacific Repertory Theatre
2009	A Civil War Christmas	Various ensemble roles	TheatreWorks Silicon Valley
2010	Red Light Winter	Matt	Custom Made Theatre Company
2010	Mirrors in Every Corner	Watts	Intersection for the Arts
2010	In the Red and Brown Water	The Egungun	Marin Theatre Company
2011	Fabulation, or the Re-Education of Undine	Flow Barnes Calles	The Lorraine Hansberry Theatre
2012	A Behanding in Spokane	Toby	San Francisco Playhouse
2013	Hamilton	Marquis de Lafayette / Thomas Jefferson	Vassar College
2014	Hamilton	Marquis de Lafayette / Thomas Jefferson	The 52nd Street Project
2015	Hamilton	Marquis de Lafayette / Thomas Jefferson	The Public Theater
2015–2016	Hamilton	Marquis de Lafayette / Thomas Jefferson	Richard Rodgers Theatre
2019	White Noise	Leo	The Public Theater
2019–2021	Freestyle Love Supreme	"Mr. Diggs"/Himself (select performances)	Booth Theatre

== Discography ==
=== Solo ===
- The BAY BOY Mixtape (2010) - collaboration with Rafael Casal
- Small Things to a Giant (2012)
- Blindspotting: The Collin EP (2018)
- Seven Nights in Chicago (2019) - collaboration with Rafael Casal

=== With clipping. ===
- Dba118 (2012) - EP
- midcity (2013)
- CLPPNG (2014)
- Wriggle (2016) - EP
- REMXNG (2016) - EP
- Splendor & Misery (2016)
- There Existed an Addiction to Blood (2019)
- "Chapter 319" (2020)
- Visions of Bodies Being Burned (2020)
- "Puppy for Hanukkah" (2020) - collaboration with Disney Channel
- Dead Channel Sky (2025)

=== With True Neutral Crew ===
- #MONSANTO (2013) - EP
- #POPPUNK (2014) - EP
- soft rules (2016)

=== Featured artist ===
- The Monster (2009) - featured on "Running Down" & "Wise Guys"
- Mean Ones (2012) - additional vocals
- Hamilton (2015) - original Broadway cast recording
- Thumbs (2015) - featured on "Surrounded by Millionaires"
- Good For You (2016) - single; featured rapper
- Maiden Voyage Suite (2016) - EP by Sir Benedick the Moor; featured on 1200am
- x Infinity (2016) - featured on Exquisite Corpse

== Concerts ==
- midcity promotional concerts (5 shows, in the US and UK, February 19, 2013 –- March 18, 2014)
- CLPPNG Tour (19 shows, in the US and the UK, July 3 – November 10, 2014)
- #POPPUNK promotional concerts (3 shows, in the US, July 17, 2014 – June 5, 2015)

== Awards and nominations ==
Year	Association	Category	Work	Result
2015	Lucille Lortel Awards	Outstanding Featured Actor in a Musical	Hamilton	Won
2015	Drama League Award	Distinguished Performance	Hamilton	Nominated
2015	Theatre World Award	Outstanding Debut Performance	Hamilton	Won
2016	Tony Award	Best Featured Actor in a Musical	Hamilton	Won
2016	Drama League Award	Distinguished Performance	Hamilton	Nominated
2016	Grammy Award	Best Musical Theater Album	Hamilton	Won
2016	Fred and Adele Astaire Award	Best Male Dancer	Hamilton	Nominated
2016	Broadway.com Audience Awards	Favorite Featured Actor in a Musical	Hamilton	Nominated
2016	Broadway.com Audience Awards	Favorite Funny Performance	Hamilton	Nominated
2016	Broadway.com Audience Awards	Favorite Breakthrough Performance (male)	Hamilton	Won
2017	Hugo Award	Best Dramatic Presentation (Short Form)	Splendor & Misery (with clipping.)	Finalist
2018	Atlanta Film Festival	Innovator Award	Blindspotting	Won
2018	Independent Spirit Award	Best Male Lead	Blindspotting	Nominated
2018	Hugo Award	Best Dramatic Presentation (Short Form)	"The Deep" (with clipping.)	Finalist
2019	Outer Critics Circle Awards	Outstanding Actor in a Play	White Noise	Nominated
2020	Hugo Award	Best Novella	The Deep (with Rivers Solomon and clipping.)	Finalist
2021	Critics' Choice Super Awards	Best Actor in an Action Series	Snowpiercer	Won
2021	Critics' Choice Television Awards	Best Supporting Actor in a Movie/Miniseries	The Good Lord Bird	Nominated
2021	Primetime Emmy Awards	Outstanding Supporting Actor in a Limited or Anthology Series or Movie	Hamilton	Nominated
2021	Screen Actors Guild Awards	Outstanding Male Actor in a Miniseries or Television Movie	Hamilton	Nominated
2023	Children's and Family Emmy Awards	Outstanding Young Teen Series	The Crossover	Won
2026	Primetime Creative Arts Emmy Awards	Outstanding Original Music and Lyrics	"Raise Him Up" – The Boys (with Christopher Lennertz)	Nominated

== Honors ==
On May 28, 2017, an honorary Doctor of Fine Arts degree was conferred upon Diggs during the 249th commencement ceremony at Brown University, his alma mater.

== See also ==
- African-American Tony nominees and winners
