= I Lie Here Buried with My Rings and My Dresses =

2021 studio album by Backxwash

Studio album by Backxwash
- Released: June 20, 2021
- Genre: Industrial hip-hop; horrorcore
- Length: 33:03
- Label: Ugly Hag Records
- Producer: Backxwash; clipping; Code Orange; NOWHERE2RUN; William Owen Bennett

Backxwash chronology
Stigmata EP (2020)	I Lie Here Buried with My Rings and My Dresses (2021)	His Happiness Shall Come First Even Though We Are Suffering (2022)

Singles from I Lie Here Buried with My Rings and My Dresses
- 1. "I Lie Here Buried with My Rings and My Dresses" Released: May 6, 2021

I Lie Here Buried with My Rings and My Dresses (stylized in all caps) is the third studio album by Zambian-Canadian rapper and producer Backxwash. The album was self released on June 20, 2021, through Ugly Hag Records. The album features guest appearances with artists such as Ada Rook, Censored Dialogue, Sad13 and features extra production from NOWHERE2RUN, Will Owen Bennett, Code Orange, and clipping. The first single of the album, titled "I Lie Here Buried With My Rings and My Dresses", was released on May 6, 2021.

== Critical reception ==
Professional ratings
Review scores
Source	Rating
AllMusic	4/5 stars
Beats Per Minute	8.5/10
Exclaim!	9/10
Pitchfork	7.6/10

The album has received generally positive reviews from music critics. Aly Laube of Exclaim! wrote that describes the album as a "rebellion against the established social and stylistic norms" while giving the album a 9/10. Writing for Beats Per Minute's "Hip Hop 2021: Halftime," John Amen wrote, "Backxwash is a talented rapper and gifted lyricist; her work, however, is ultimately textural and instinctively driven, dark ambience that transcends convention and genre."

Reviewing the album for AllMusic, Paul Simpons felt that "While there's unmistakably something macabre and theatrical about her performance, it never seems like she's interested in mere shock value. Her lyrics clearly come from personal experience, and attempt to relay what she's going through, particularly when her life is at its darkest."

The album was longlisted for the 2022 Polaris Music Prize.

== Track listing ==
All tracks are produced by Backxwash, except where noted.

I Lie Here Buried with My Rings and My Dresses track listing
No.	Title	Writer(s)	Producer(s)	Length
1.	"Purpose of Pain"	Ashanti Mutinta		1:21
2.	"Wail of the Banshee" (featuring SurgeryHead)	Mutinta; SurgeryHead		2:04
3.	"I Lie Here Buried with My Rings and My Dresses" (featuring Ada Rook)	Mutinta; Ada Rook		4:58
4.	"Terror Packets" (featuring Censored Dialogue)	Mutinta; Jazz Aurora		4:59
5.	"In Thy Holy Name" (featuring Lauren Bousfield)	Mutinta		3:36
6.	"Blood in the Water"	Mutinta; Jonathan Snipes; William Hutson	clipping.	1:39
7.	"Song of Sinners" (featuring Sad13 and Ada Rook)	Mutinta; Sadie Dupuis		4:45
8.	"666 in Luxaxa"	Mutinta		2:38
9.	"Nine Hells"	Mutinta; Eric Balderose; Jami Morgan	Code Orange; NOWHERE2RUN	2:58
10.	"Burn to Ashes" (featuring Michael Go)	Mutinta; Michael Go; William Owen Bennett	Backxwash; Bennett	4:01
