= Ora Cogan =

Canadian musician and photographer

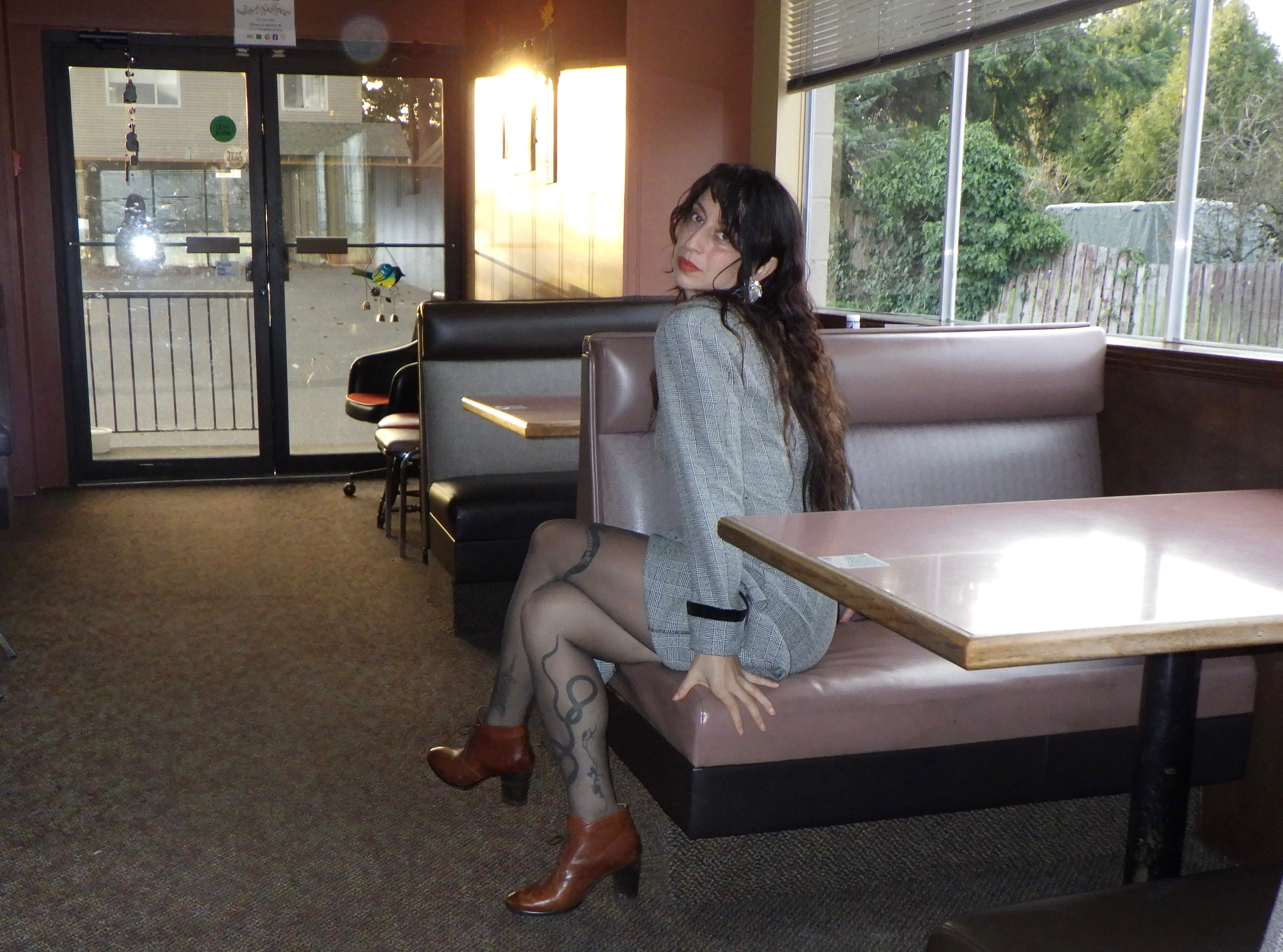

Ora Cogan is a Canadian indie folk singer-songwriter, based in Nanaimo, British Columbia. She is most noted for her 2026 album Hard Hearted Woman, which was a longlisted nominee for the 2026 Polaris Music Prize.

Born and raised in the Gulf Islands of British Columbia, she has also worked as an activist and photographer, including extensive photojournalism documenting the Fairy Creek old-growth logging protests of 2020 and 2021. She released a number of EPs and albums independently or on small record labels, until signing with Sacred Bones Records for the release of Hard Hearted Woman.

She also appeared as a collaborator on Backxwash's 2025 album Only Dust Remains.

== Discography ==
- Sparrow - 2005
- Tatter - 2007
- Harbouring - 2008
- The Quarry - 2010
- The Boggy Mire - 2010
- Ribbon Vine - 2013
- Shadowland - 2016
- Crickets - 2017
- Bells in the Ruins - 2020
- Formless - 2023
- Hard Hearted Woman - 2026
