= Visions of Bodies Being Burned =

Studio album by clipping.
- Released: October 23, 2020
- Recorded: 2015–2020
- Genre: Experimental hip hop; industrial hip hop; horrorcore; noise rap
- Length: 52:34
- Label: Sub Pop
- Producer: William Hutson; Jonathan Snipes

Clipping. chronology
There Existed an Addiction to Blood (2019)	Visions of Bodies Being Burned (2020)	Dead Channel Sky (2025)

Singles from Visions of Bodies Being Burned
- 1. "Say the Name" Released: August 25, 2020; 2. "'96 Neve Campbell" Released: September 24, 2020; 3. "Pain Everyday" Released: October 12, 2020

Visions of Bodies Being Burned is the fourth studio album by American hip hop group clipping. It was released on October 23, 2020 through Sub Pop. It received positive reviews from music critics.

== Background and recording ==
Clipping described Visions of Bodies Being Burned in a press release as a "second half of a planned diptych", continuing the horrorcore and industrial stylings of their previous release There Existed an Addiction to Blood. Both albums were recorded during 2015–2020, following their sci-fi themed sophomore album Splendor & Misery, with the band creating too many songs to fit on one release and then dividing them into two parts with the help of their label, Sub Pop. Originally, Clipping intended to release Visions of Bodies Being Burned several months after There Existed an Addiction to Blood, however, the COVID-19 pandemic forced their record label to postpone the album until 2020 Halloween season.

In the time between There Existed an Addiction to Blood and Visions of Bodies Being Burned, Clipping also released the single "Chapter 319", which sampled a DJ Screw song featuring George Floyd as Big Floyd, along with a previously SoundCloud-only track "Knees on the Ground" on Bandcamp and donated all proceeds from the sales to organizations dedicated to racial justice. "Chapter 319" was recorded during the protests after the murder of George Floyd, while "Knees on the Ground" was originally recorded after the shooting of Michael Brown in 2014. "Chapter 319" became a meme on TikTok, consisting of teenagers rapping along to a line from the song calling US president Donald Trump a white supremacist and filming their parents' reactions.

== Music and lyrics ==
The album continues the slasher film themes and abrasive production style of Clipping's previous album, There Existed an Addiction to Blood, essentially serving as its second half. According to the band, the album "contains sixteen more scary stories disguised as rap songs, incorporating as much influence from Ernest Dickerson, Clive Barker, and Shirley Jackson as it does from Three 6 Mafia, Bone Thugs-N-Harmony, and Brotha Lynch Hung". As with other Clipping albums, Daveed Diggs' lyrics avoid first-person narration, primarily describing the events in third person or addressing the listener in second person.

The production on the album is heavy, often bordering on distortion, with influences from both modern industrial, noise, power electronics and 1980s horror movie soundtracks. Describing his disappointment with many concept albums that he encountered being still primarily "guitar-drums-bass", producer Jonathan Snipes stressed that the band aimed to choose timbres and sounds that were meaningful in the context of the songs and referenced concepts described in the lyrics. The band are known for their meticulous approach to sampling and avoidance of using pre-made royalty-free sounds, recording all of the samples and sound effects themselves. On the closer, "Secret Piece", and throughout the album, Clipping also use a number of dawn chorus recordings that Snipes and field recordist Christopher Fleeger made at famous murder sites, one of which was cited as the Black Dahlia murder site, which Snipes woke up before dawn for a week to do field recording at.

The title of the album quotes a line by Scarface from "Mind Playing Tricks on Me" by Geto Boys, sampled in re-recorded form on the album's first single, "Say the Name", which also references the 1992 slasher film Candyman. For the chorus of "Say the Name", which repeats the quote, the band recorded Diggs's voice and pitched it down, since the vocal track of "Mind Playing Tricks on Me" was never available separately. The song was already "old to them", according to the band, by the time they were sequencing their previous album, There Existed an Addiction to Blood, and was meant to be its second single, however, obtaining permission for the sample proved difficult. Since "Mind Playing Tricks on Me" itself contains a sample of "Hung Up on My Baby" by Isaac Hayes, permission had to be obtained from his estate also, even though no part of Hayes's work is in "Say the Name"; yet, as a result, the Isaac Hayes estate owns a larger percent of "Say the Name" than Clipping members or Scarface. According to the band, the extended instrumental coda of the song was inspired by the Nine Inch Nails song "Closer", since early on during the production of the song, the drum sounds reminded them of it.

"'96 Neve Campbell", the album's second single, is centered around a re-imagining of the slasher "final girl" archetype, such as Sidney Prescott portrayed by Neve Campbell in the Scream series, with the first Scream film coming out in 1996, hence the name. In the song, the female leads themselves are portrayed as grotesquely violent and threatening, as performed by rap duo Cam & China, with Diggs both narrating the track and performing the part of the killer, his voice altered to sound as if it were heard over the phone. In an interview with Anthony Fantano, the band revealed that before Diggs wrote the final verse of the song, Hutson had pitched a list of several other possible titles for the song, such as "'78 Jamie Lee Curtis" and "'84 Heather Langenkamp".

The third single, "Pain Everyday", recorded in 7/8 time and containing breakbeat influences, describes the experiences of afterlife as painful and features recordings by paranormal investigator and electronic voice phenomenon researcher Michael Esposito. It was the last song recorded for the album, upon insistence from Snipes that the album, like other Clipping releases, contain at least one song that is not in 4/4 time. The unusual time signature, which, according to Hutson, sounded as if the beat was "tripping over itself", coupled with the EVP recordings by Esposito, inspired the band to write a "chase sequence" piece involving ghosts.

Power electronics-influenced "Make Them Dead" initially featured a different set of lyrics by Diggs, yet the band felt they did not fit the production, which led to them discard them with the intention of writing a new beat for them later. According to Diggs, whose lyrical style was inspired by the authoritative approach typical of power electronics, "the politics of it are about [...] if there is a thing that is being hunted in that song, it is right-wing Bible-thumping Trump supporters".

"Body for the Pile" features additional production by noise artist Chris Goudreau as Sickness and has previously been released on the 2016 Adult Swim singles compilation NOISE.

As with most other Clipping releases, the album closes with a recording of an avant-garde performance piece, in this case, Yoko Ono's 1953 "event score", "Secret Piece", which was published in her 1964 book Grapefruit. The piece consists of text instructions for the performer:

Decide on one note that you want to play. Play it with the following accompaniment:
The woods from 5 a.m. to 8 a.m. in summer.

The band, particularly Hutson, were struck by the peculiarity of the wording, since it did not require for the performer to actually be in the woods, only to use an accompaniment. The band then turned to field-recordist Christopher Fleeger, who provided them with gigabytes of his own field recordings that were made in forests around the world, between 5 a.m. and 8 a.m., matching the criteria in the piece.

== Critical reception ==
Professional ratings
Aggregate scores
Source	Rating
AnyDecentMusic?	7.7/10
Metacritic	79/100
Review scores
Source	Rating
AllMusic	4/5 stars
Clash	8/10
Exclaim!	9/10
The Line of Best Fit	8/10
Pitchfork	6.0/10
PopMatters	8/10
Under the Radar	8.5/10
DIY Magazine	4/5 stars

Visions of Bodies Being Burned was met with positive critical reception. At Metacritic, which assigns a weighted average score out of 100 to reviews from mainstream critics, the album received an average score of 79 out of 100, based on 14 reviews. Aggregator AnyDecentMusic? gave it 7.7 out of 10, based on their assessment of the critical consensus.

In his DIY Magazine review, Nick Harris called the album "their most distilled output — this is a once-in-a-generation band reaching their peak". Writing for Under the Radar, Caleb Campbell said that "few listening experiences this year are as gripping, visceral, and vivid as Visions of Bodies Being Burned" and called the album "a perfect complement" to its predecessor. Fred Thomas for AllMusic called the album "a particularly threatening chapter of horrorcore that renders even some of the more severe acts that came before almost cartoonish by comparison". Stephen Kearse from Pitchfork was less enthusiastic, claiming that "there's plenty of mood to clipping.'s horrorcore, but no theater, no ham, no cheese."

== Track listing ==
All tracks are produced by Clipping.

Visions of Bodies Being Burned
No.	Title	Writer(s)	Length
1.	"Intro"	Daveed Diggs; Jonathan Snipes; William Hutson; Greh Holger	2:20
2.	"Say The Name"	Diggs; Snipes; Hutson; Brad Jordan	5:00
3.	"Wytchboard (Interlude)"	Diggs; Snipes; Hutson	0:30
4.	"'96 Neve Campbell" (featuring Cam & China)	Diggs; Snipes; Hutson; Camera Walker; China Walker	3:21
5.	"Something Underneath"	Diggs; Snipes; Hutson	2:36
6.	"Make Them Dead"	Diggs; Snipes; Hutson	4:06
7.	"She Bad"	Diggs; Snipes; Hutson	3:27
8.	"Invocation (Interlude)" (with Greg Stuart)	Diggs; Snipes; Hutson; Greg Stuart	1:13
9.	"Pain Everyday" (with Michael Esposito)	Diggs; Snipes; Hutson	3:39
10.	"Check The Lock"	Diggs; Snipes; Hutson; Joe Lester	3:37
11.	"Looking Like Meat" (featuring Ho99o9)	Diggs; Snipes; Hutson; Jean Lebrun; Lawrence Eaddy	3:30
12.	"Drove (Interlude)"		0:52
13.	"Eaten Alive" (with Jeff Parker and Ted Byrnes)	Diggs; Snipes; Hutson; Jeff Parker; Ted Byrnes; John W. Snyder	5:42
14.	"Body for the Pile" (with SICKNESS)	Diggs; Snipes; Hutson; Chris Goudreau	4:25
15.	"Enlacing"	Diggs; Snipes; Hutson; Kyle Parker	4:43
16.	"Secret Piece"	Yoko Ono	3:42
Total length:			52:34

=== Sample credits ===
- "Intro" contains a sample of "Seance", composed by Greh Holger and performed by Black Sand Desert.
- "Say the Name" contains an interpolation of "Mind Playing Tricks on Me", written by Brad Jordan, Doug King, William Dennis, and Isaac Hayes, and performed by the Geto Boys.
- "Pain Everyday" contains original EVP recordings captured by Michael Esposito.
- "Enlacing" contains a sample of "Enlacing", composed by Kyle Parker and performed by Infinite Body.

== Personnel ==
Clipping

- Daveed Diggs – vocals, lyrics, music, art direction, design
- William Hutson – music, production, sound effects, recording, art direction, design
- Jonathan Snipes – music, production, sound effects, recording, art direction, design

Additional production

- Steve Kaplan – mixing
- Rashad Becker – mastering
- Cristina Bercovitz – art direction, design
- Myra Dingley – photography

Additional musicians

- Casey Anderson – alto saxophone on "Secret Piece"
- Jonathan Borges – electronics on "Secret Piece"
- MaryClare Brzytwa – flute on "Secret Piece"
- Ted Byrnes – drums on "Eaten Alive" and "Secret Piece"
- Kirsten Carey – guitar on "Secret Piece"
- Caliegh Drane – cello on "Pain Everyday" and "Secret Piece"
- Eaddy – additional lyrics and vocals on "Looking Like Meat"
- Christopher Fleeger – additional field recordings on "Intro" and "Secret Piece"
- Chris Goudreau – additional production and electronics on "Body for the Pile"
- Chukwudi Hodge – drums on "Say the Name" and "Secret Piece"
- Shannon Kennedy – cello, psaltery on "Secret Piece"
- Cam & China – additional lyrics and vocals on "'96 Neve Campbell"
- Joe Lester – bass guitar on "Check the Lock", double bass on "Secret Piece"
- Hal Rosenfeld – vibraphone on "Secret Piece"
- David Rothbaum – bass guitar on "Secret Piece"
- Daria Sarraf – harp on "Eaten Alive"
- John W. Snyder – additional composition on "Eaten Alive", piano on "Secret Piece"
- Greg Stuart – glockenspiel on "Invocation (Interlude)" and "Secret Piece", marimba on "Secret Piece"
- Michael Esposito – EVP field recordings on "Pain Everyday"
- Jeff Parker – guitar on "Eaten Alive"
- theOGM – additional lyrics and vocals on "Looking Like Meat"
