= Peaceful as Hell =

Studio album by Black Dresses
- Released: April 13, 2020
- Genre: Noise pop
- Length: 46:40
- Label: Blacksquares

Black Dresses chronology
Love and Affection for Stupid Little Bitches (2019)	Peaceful as Hell (2020)	Forever in Your Heart (2021)

Singles from Peaceful as Hell
- 1. "Creep U" Released: April 7, 2020

Peaceful as Hell is the fourth studio album by Canadian noise pop duo Black Dresses. It was released on April 13, 2020, the second anniversary of their first studio album Wasteisolation, under Blacksquares Records. It was preceded by the lead single of the album "Creep U" which was released on April 7. The album was the duo's last album before their announced disbandment in May 2020 due to harassment of the band following their unexpected success on platforms such as TikTok. Despite this, they released a follow-up record, Forever in Your Heart, the following year.

== Style and themes ==
Musically, Peaceful as Hell is an electronic album with elements of industrial, noise, glitch, indie rock, pop and pop-punk music. The album contains features such as heavy metal riffs, white noise, compression, and narration. It also explores themes such as apocalypse, self-knowledge, being transgender, dissociation, climate change, and social connection.

== Reception ==
Professional ratings
Review scores
Source	Rating
Pitchfork	7.6/10
The Needle Drop	9/10

In a positive review for Pitchfork, Leah Mandel felt the album was more accessible than previous Black Dresses albums and described it as "fun and loud as hell", concluding "Especially with the world’s hellishness currently blaring at us, every social disparity spotlighted and exacerbated, loneliness and doubt deepened to an extreme degree, Peaceful as Hell is perfect medicine." The album was Canadian rapper Backxwash's favourite album of 2020. Writing for Complex, she described the album as "incredibly sincere and very deliberate" and said that "The lyrical content can be unsettling at times, but the instrumentation gives you hope, as a listener, almost as if it is saying, 'Life can be hard, but there is light at the end of the tunnel.'" Anthony Fantano of The Needle Drop said of the album "Black Dresses mercilessly kills us with kindness on Peaceful as Hell", later placing it in third place on his list of the best albums of 2020.

The song "Mirrorgirl" was included in The Fader's 20 best electronic songs April 2020 list.

== Accolades ==
Accolades for Peaceful as Hell
Publication	Accolade	Rank	Ref.
Artforum	Sasha Geffen on the Best Music of 2020	9	
The Needle Drop	50 Best Albums of 2020	3	
Spin	Spin's 30 Best Albums of 2020 – Mid-Year	—N/a	

== Track listing ==
All tracks are written by Devi McCallion and Ada Rook.

No.	Title	Length
1.	"Left Arm of Life"	4:08
2.	"Damage Suppressor"	2:55
3.	"Angel Hair"	2:44
4.	"Beautiful Friendship"	2:40
5.	"I'm a Freak Cause I'm Always Freaked Out"	3:11
6.	"Bliss and Stupidity"	4:36
7.	"Mirrorgirl"	2:17
8.	"Maybe This World Is Another Planet's Hell?"	3:47
9.	"Scared 2 Death"	2:36
10.	"Express Yourself"	2:33
11.	"Sharp Halo"	2:49
12.	"Impossible Dream"	1:21
13.	"Please Be Nice"	3:03
14.	"Creep U"	5:07
15.	"666"	2:46
Total length:		46:40
