= Paul Outlaw =

American performing artist

Paul Outlaw is an American multidisciplinary performing artist, writer and vocalist. His work includes experimental theater, film and vocal performance, and is associated with queer and African American performance movements, including the Blacktino performance tradition.

== Berlin residency (1983–1993) ==
Outlaw was born in New York City, where he lived before moving to West Berlin in 1983. There, he was a founding member of the Berlin Playactors, an English-language theater company. With the group, he performed at European venues including the Quartier Latin and the British Council in Berlin, as well as the Melkweg and Vondelpark in Amsterdam. As a vocalist and lyricist, Outlaw collaborated with the post-punk group Die Haut on their 1987 EP Fandango.

In 1993, Outlaw starred in Pepe Danquart's short film Schwarzfahrer (Black Rider), which depicts a Black passenger experiencing verbal racial abuse from a white passenger on a Berlin tram.. The film subsequently won the Academy Award for Best Live Action Short Film at the 66th Academy Awards. In a 1997 profile for Der Tagesspiegel, Katrin Müller noted that Outlaw's handling of themes like racism and homophobia elucidated why Danquart cast him in the film. Outlaw's experiences in Berlin later served as the basis for his theatrical project Wall Berliner, Wahlberliner, which is currently in development.

== Experimental theater and performance ==
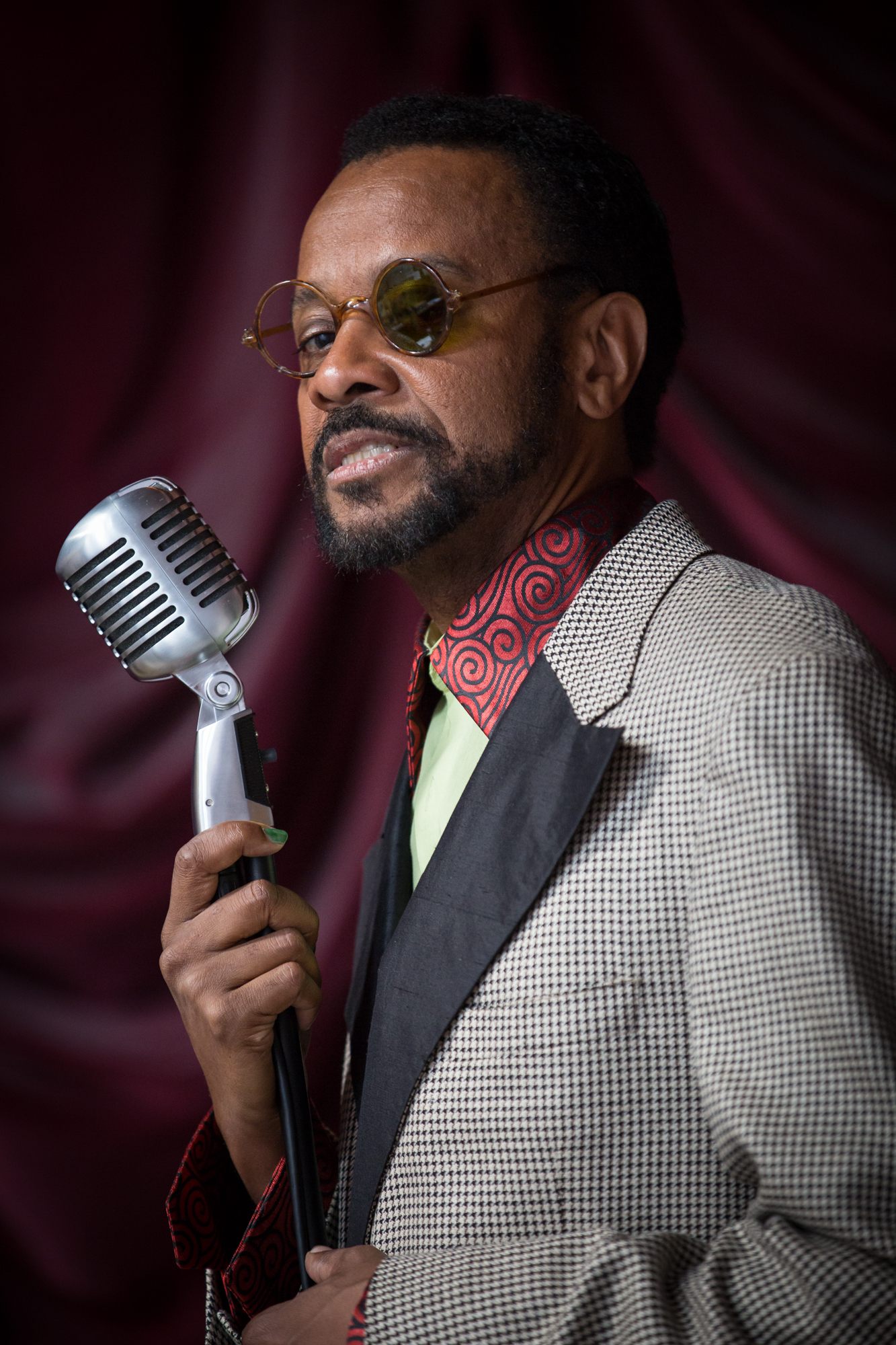
Paul Outlaw in The Late, Late Show (2013)

Since returning to the United States, Outlaw has created solo and collaborative performance works. His 2003 play, Berserker, was included in the Duke University Press anthology Blacktino Queer Performance (2016), edited by E. Patrick Johnson and Ramón H. Rivera-Servera. The editors described the work as a "meditation upon interracial desire and disappearing blackness."

Other works include:

- The Late, Late Show (2013): A three-act "vampire play" with music depicting the life of a 300-year-old protagonist born in Antebellum North Carolina.
- BBC (Big Black Cockroach) (2024): A satirical solo work inspired by Franz Kafka's The Metamorphosis, Greek mythology, and Afrofuturism. A workshop version of the work was presented at REDCAT's New Original Works Festival in 2019, followed by the evening-length premiere in 2024.

== Collaborations and critical reception ==
In 2016, Outlaw played the 19th-century Shakespearean actor Ira Aldridge in the West Coast premiere of Lolita Chakrabarti's Red Velvet. Writing for the Los Angeles Times, critic David C. Nichols noted that Outlaw's performance brought a "regal, resonant authority" to the role. In 2018, he appeared as a featured singer in the Boston Court Pasadena production of A Streetcar Named Desire. Los Angeles Times critic Charles McNulty characterized Outlaw's performance as that of a "radical hip-hop torch singer."

Outlaw has frequently collaborated with contemporary musicians on performance projects and recordings. In 2016, he provided guest vocals for the experimental hip-hop group clipping. on their Hugo Award-nominated album Splendor & Misery. He is the sole performer in the music video for the single "True Believer," directed by Carlos López Estrada.

== Awards, residencies and community leadership ==
Outlaw is a founding member of the LA LGBTQ+ Arts & Culture Coalition, a regional network of queer and trans artists and cultural organizations established in 2025 in partnership with the One Institute.

In 2012, Outlaw was awarded a City of Los Angeles (COLA) Individual Artist Fellowship. In 2021, he was a featured artist in the One Institute’s Pride Publics: Words and Actions multi-site public art exhibition.

He has participated in artist residencies at the Ucross Foundation, and writing residencies sponsored by Los Angeles Performance Practice and the Speranza Foundation. He is a recipient of the Lincoln City Fellowship and received a Performing Arts Recovery Grant from the Los Angeles County Department of Arts and Culture.
