= Cartel Madras =

Canadian hip hop duo

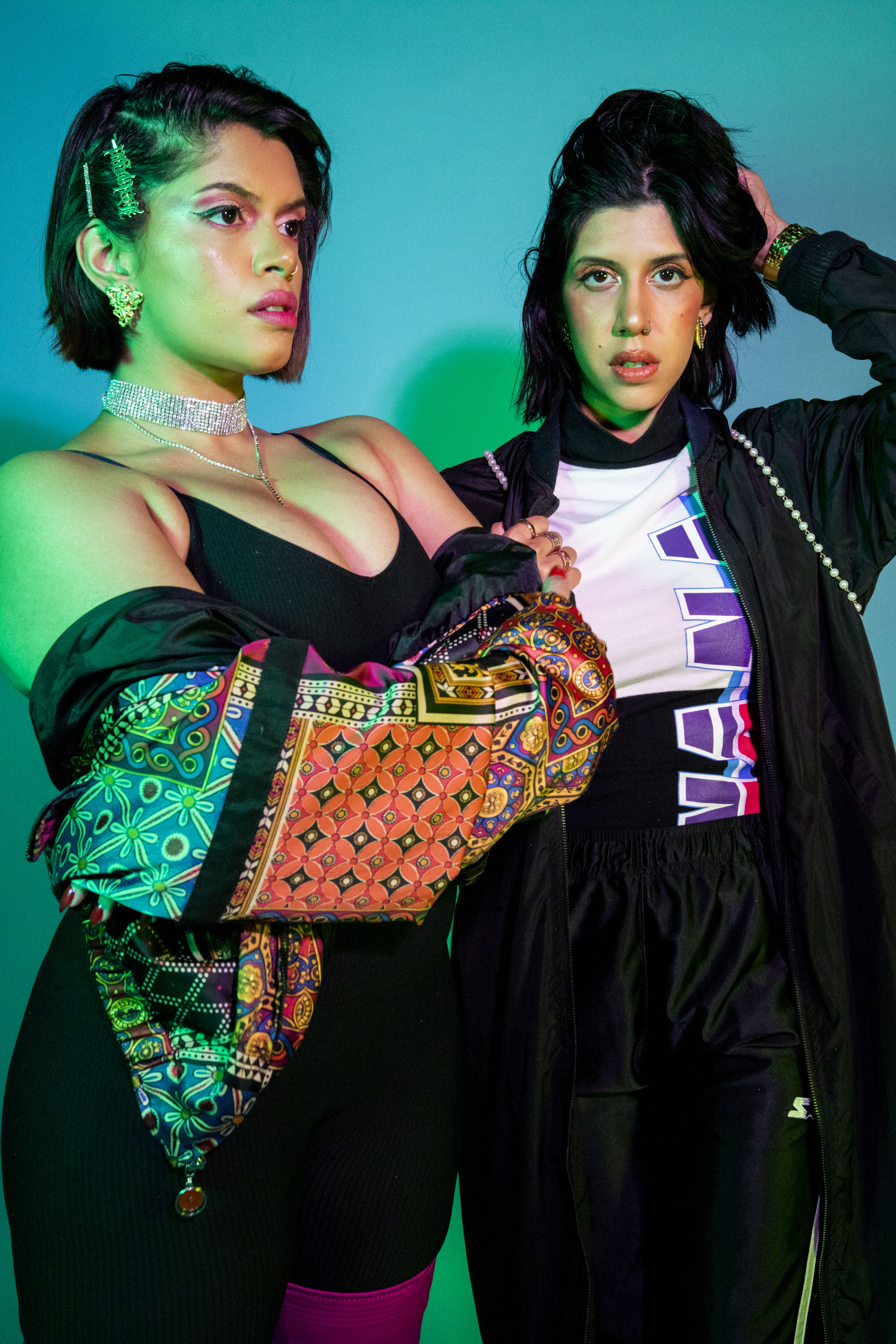

Background information
- Origin: Calgary, Alberta, Canada
- Genre: Hip hop
- Years active: 2018-present
- Labels: Sub Pop, Royal Mountain Records
- Members: Eboshi: Contra
- Website: cartelmadras.com

Cartel Madras is a Canadian hip hop duo from Calgary, Alberta, consisting of sisters Bhagya "Eboshi" Ramesh and Priya "Contra" Ramesh. They characterize their music as "Goonda Rap" and began their career uploading songs to SoundCloud.

Cartel Madras released their debut mixtape, Project Goonda Part 1: Trapistan, in 2018. In 2019, they signed to Sub Pop and Royal Mountain Records and their EP, Age of the Goonda, was released on November 1. Their most recent album, The Serpent & The Tiger was released August 19, 2021.

== Formation ==
Both sisters emigrated from Chennai, India they are half Tamil and half Malayalee and identify as queer, with Eboshi identifying as pansexual. They classify their music as "Goonda Rap". Their music combines elements of hip hop, house, punk, electronic, and South Indian influences. The duo cite Freddie Gibbs, M.I.A., Scarface, Cupcakke, and MF Doom as influences.

== Career ==
Cartel Madras began by releasing songs on their SoundCloud. Their debut mixtape Project Goonda Part 1: Trapistan was released in 2018. The lead single for the mixtape was titled "Pork and Leek". The duo helped develop a collective known as THOTNATION which consists of close collaborators like Jae Sterling, yungkamaji, and Jide. Later that year, Cartel Madras played at Pop Montreal, opening for Cupcakke. At a show at Calgary's Sled Island festival, five months after their formation, they caught the attention of Ishmael Butler, a member of the A&R team of the label Sub Pop.

In 2019, Cartel Madras won $10,000 from the Telus Storyhive grant to film a music video for "Eric Andre (Slick Rick James)". The music video featured cameos from K.d. lang and Vivek Shraya and was released in May 2019. In June, Sub Pop announced they had signed Cartel Madras and that new music was being worked on. The duo announced an EP, Age of the Goonda, to be released on November 1, 2019. Two singles were released in the lead up to the EP release, "Lil Pump Type Beat" and "Goonda Gold". After the EP release, the duo announced a series of Canadian tour dates, opening for Hollerado, Fetty Wap, and Clipping. Eventually, the song was announced as a part of the EA Sports UFC 4 official game soundtrack. They were included on Vogue India's list of artists set to breakthrough in 2020.

In 2020, Cartel Madras began their first international tour opening for Sudan Archives in North America. Following this tour, it was announced that they would also join Clipping on tour across the United States in May 2020 in support of Clipping's album, There Existed an Addiction to Blood. However, this tour would later be postponed due to COVID-19.

In 2020, Cartel Madras released two singles, "WORKING" and "Stay Up All Night", the latter a collaboration with GWS. "WORKING" was later named one of "The most underrated Canadian songs of 2020", by CBC Music. "WORKING" was featured in the soundtrack for the final season of the Hulu series Shrill.

In 2021, the duo released the single, "DRIFT", alongside announcing their forthcoming project The Serpent and The Tiger, which will be the third instalment of their Project Goonda trilogy, after Trapistan (2018) and Age of the Goonda (2019). In May, they also released a single, "Dream Girl Concept" with Jide and Tyris White, alongside a music video that they directed and starred in. On July 8, they released another single from the upcoming project, "Fear & Loathing", with Dom Dias. The music video for "Fear & Loathing" stars Cartel Madras, Dom Dias, Sheerah, and Sharanya and was directed by Cartel Madras and Jashan Makan. They also participated in the Emerging Wildly project and residency at Yellowknife's Folk on the Rocks festival, along with Partner and Celeigh Cardinal.

== Discography ==
=== Mixtapes ===
- Project Goonda Part 1: Trapistan (2018)

=== EPs ===
- Age of the Goonda (2019)
- The Serpent and The Tiger (2021)

=== Singles ===
- "Pork and Leek" (2018)
- "Lil Pump Type Beat" (2019)
- "Goonda Gold" (2019)
- "WORKING" with Jide (2020)
- "Stay Up All Night" with GWS (2020)
- "DRIFT" with Dom Dias (2021)
- "Dream Girl Concept" with Jide and Tyris White (2021)
- "Fear & Loathing" with Dom Dias (2021)
