= Dos Monos =

Japanese experimental hip hop group

- Origin: Tokyo, Japan
- Genres: Japanese hip hop; experimental hip hop; jazz rap
- Years active: 2015–present
- Labels: Deathbomb Arc; BPM Tokyo; Warner Music Japan
- Members: Botsu aka NGS; Taitan; Zo Zhit

Dos Monos is a Japanese experimental hip hop group based in Tokyo. The trio consists of rappers Taitan and NGS (aka Botsu) and rapper-producer Zo Zhit. Their debut album Dos City was released in 2019 by the independent American record label Deathbomb Arc. Dos Monos lyrics are characterized by switching between English and Japanese in a bilingual manner.

== Career ==
Before founding Dos Monos, the future members attended the same all-boys school in Tokyo. In high school they all played in different bands, ranging from grunge to punk rock. Botsu started listening to instrumental hip-hop after looking up some of the artists listed on the sleeve of Panda Bear's 2007 album Person Pitch. After graduating high school Zo Zhit and Botsu reconnected by sending beats to rap over to each other. The three of them officially formed Dos Monos and started making music together in 2015 after taking an interest in hip-hop. Early influences included modern hip-hop producers J Dilla, Flying Lotus and Madlib with samples taken from jazz and progressive rock records such as those of Frank Zappa.

For the next few years the trio would play a lot of live shows and even attended a few international festivals. In 2018, they signed with American record label Deathbomb Arc after Botsu sent them their demo over email. According to him signing with Deathbomb made other experimental musicians aware of them, among them future collaborators black midi and Injury Reserve. The label also helped them set up their first tour.

Dos Monos' debut album Dos City was released March 20, 2019. It quickly gained some online traction, most notably being favorably reviewed by American music critic Anthony Fantano. The album was released by Deathbomb Arc. A review by Paste Magazine at the time pointed out the sonic influence from Madlib and commented on the abrasiveness of the 13-track album as well as the lyrics' political content.

In May 2020, Dos Monos released "Civil Rap Song" sampling an interview with Taiwan's digital minister Audrey Tang. The song attracted attention as an unusual collaboration between hip-hop and politics.

Dos Siki, the group's debut EP, was released on 27 July, 2020. It features RiTchie from American hip-hop trio Injury Reserve and was favorably reviewed at the time. In September of 2020 Dos Monos and TV Tokyo collaborated on an experimental late-night program called Futa that would play new music videos and songs from the group.

On the one-year-anniversary of Dos Siki in 2021 the group released Dos Siki 2nd Season, a remix album of their previous album featuring English rock band black midi, among many more. Detailing his workflow in an interview with Japanese magazine Tokion, Zo Zhit shares how "A Spring Monkey Song" was done by removing individual tracks from the original song and letting different musicians fill them in one by one, creating a "cut-and-paste vibe". Dos Monos ended the year with the release of single "ŌBO" made for the new season of the Japanese TV show Documental by Hitoshi Matsumoto.

In 2022 they released a 20-minute collaborative track together with Japanese novelist Yasutaka Tsutsui. In the same year the trio performed at the experimental Dutch music festival Le Guess Who? as part of the program curated by American hip-hop trio clipping.

In the rollout for Dos Atomos, their sophomore studio album, the group released a press statement, announcing the "second chapter" of Dos Monos. Furthermore they share that after an exhaustive tour in Europe they were on the verge of breaking up, leading them to reinvent themselves. Dos Atomos which was released 31 May 2024 revolves around Japan's relationship with nuclear power after WWII. As with previous releases, Dos Atomos features many musicians outside of the group, such as Morgan Simpson of black midi. Additionally, the lead single "Que Gi" features multi-instrumentalist Otomo Yoshihide on turntable and the official release party opened with a DJ set by Yamantaka Eye of Boredoms.

=== Solo work ===
Over the years Botsu regularly collaborated with other Japanese musicians such as uami, Naked Under Leather and BBBBBBB, culminating in multiple collaborative albums.

== Members ==
- Botsu aka NGS – vocals, DJ
- Taitan – vocals
- Zo Zhit – vocals, production

== Discography ==
=== Studio Albums ===
- 2019 – Dos City
- 2021 – Larderello
- 2024 – Dos Atomos
- 2026 – Dos Moons

=== EPs ===
- 2020 – Dos Siki
- 2021 – Dos Siki 2nd Season
- 2023 – DMAN [excerpt]
- 2025 – Dos Moons EP
- 2025 – Dos Moons 2 EP
