= Williams Mix =

Composition by John Cage

- by John Cage
- Page three of the score
- Composed: 1952
- Performed: March 23, 1953
- Published: Unpublished
- Movements: 1
- Scoring: 193 page graphic score

Williams Mix (1951–1953) is a 4'16" electroacoustic composition by John Cage for eight simultaneously played independent quarter-inch magnetic tapes. The first piece of octophonic music, the piece was created by Cage with the assistance of Earle Brown, Morton Feldman, David Tudor, and Bebe and Louis Barron (who would later create the first all-electronic feature film soundtrack for Forbidden Planet) using many recorded sound sources on tape and a graphic score by the composer. "Presignifying the development of algorithmic composition, granular synthesis, and sound diffusion," it was the third of five pieces completed in the Project for Music for Magnetic Tape (1951–1954), funded by dedicatee architect Paul F Williams Jr. Richard Kostelanetz of Stereo Review described Williams Mix as a "tape collage composed ... by chance procedures" which, similar to Cage's earlier works (but not many subsequent ones), was "offered to the world in a permanent form."

The material recorded by the Barrons was organized into six categories: city, country, electronic, manually produced, wind, and "small" sounds. These sounds were then "subjected...to I Ching manipulations, producing constant jumps from one sound to another or buzzing, scrambled textures of up to sixteen simultaneous layers." The 193-page score, "a full-size drawing of the tape fragments, which served as a 'score' for the splicing," is described by Cage as similar to "a dressmaker's pattern – it literally shows where the tape shall be cut, and you lay the tape on the score itself." Thus, like a recipe, the piece may be recreated using different tapes and the score.

The work was premiered March 23, 1953 at the University of Illinois Urbana-Champaign as part of an evening that Cage programmed of music for magnetic tape during the Festival of Contemporary Arts. The audience's reaction was divided with some booing. The piece was also played at the 25th Year Retrospective Concert of the Music of John Cage on May 15, 1958, and was recorded by Columbia Records producer George Avakian. Avakian released this recording of the concert on a three-LP set with a booklet including extensive notes and illustrations of scores.

Larry Austin later created a computer program, the "Williams (re)Mix(er)", based on an analysis of "Williams Mix", which could "yield ever-new Williams Mix scores." With this software, Austin created Williams (re)Mix[ed] (1997–2000), an octophonic variation of Williams Mix using different sound sources.

In 2012, University of California, San Diego electronic music professor Tom Erbe became the first person to recreate "Williams Mix" from the original score, creating performance software in Pure Data carefully following the score and Cage's notes. Erbe's debut performance of "Williams Mix" was on Cage's 100th birthday, September 5, 2012, at Fresh Sound in San Diego. Erbe also created a version of "Williams Mix" for clipping.'s 2014 album CLPPNG, using samples of the band's music as the sound material.

In 2024, Medio Mutante became the first artist to produce a new version of "Williams Mix" using tape. The process was streamed to Twitch and a short documentary was made available on YouTube. The piece was released as an eight record boxed set and premiered at the San Francisco Tape Music Center in 2025.

== Discography ==
- John Cage (1994). The 25 Year Retrospective Concert of the Music of John Cage. Wergo [6247].
- (2000/2005). OHM: The Early Gurus of Electronic Music. Ellipsis Arts [3690].
- Larry Austin (2001). Octo-Mixes, Larry Austin, Octophonic Computer Music, 1996–2001 . EMF CD 039.
- John Cage (2010). Fontana Mix. Él.
- clipping. and Tom Erbe (2014). Last track on CLPPNG. Sub Pop SP1071.
- Medio Mutante (2024). John Cage Williams Mix 23A. Electronic Thunder ET010.
