= His Happiness Shall Come First Even Though We Are Suffering =

Studio album by Backxwash
- Released: October 31, 2022
- Genre: Hip-hop
- Length: 38:13
- Label: Ugly Hag Records

Backxwash chronology
I Lie Here Buried with My Rings and My Dresses (2021)	His Happiness Shall Come First Even Though We Are Suffering (2022)	Only Dust Remains (2025)

His Happiness Shall Come First Even Though We Are Suffering (stylized in all caps) is the fourth studio album by Zambian-Canadian rapper Backxwash. The album was announced on July 14 and released on October 31, 2022, via Ugly Hag Records, and concludes Backxwash's three album trilogy and features collaborations from various vocalists.

== Background ==
The album's release date and title was announced via social media on July 14. The release succeeds Backxwash's previous album, I Lie Here Buried with My Rings and My Dresses, and concludes the three album trilogy which also includes the 2020 album God Has Nothing to Do with This Leave Him Out of It. An announcement was made by her that she was working on Black Sailor Moon 2, a sequel to her 2018 EP, prior to the announcement and release of this album.

== Critical reception ==
Professional ratings
Review scores
Source	Rating
Beats Per Minute	84/100
Kerrang!	4/5
Pitchfork	7.6/10

Adlan Jackson of Pitchfork claimed that the album contained mostly "cacophonies of tense noise and gothic samples" and that Backxwash took "a relatively experimental approach to rap". Nick Ruskell of Kerrang! said that the album has "no small amount of catharsis and fury" and that "it is unafraid to be exactly what it is". John Amen writing for Beats Per Minute called the three album trilogy "[Backxwash's] heroic triptych" and wrote that it "[left] us stunned, devastated, ecstatic".

== Track listing ==
No.	Title	Length
1.	"Kutali" (featuring Vaelastrasz)	0:50
2.	"Vibanda" (featuring Morgan-Paige and Michael Go)	5:41
3.	"Nyama" (featuring Pupil Slicer)	4:22
4.	"Muzungu"	4:09
5.	"Zigolo" (featuring Censored Dialogue and Sadistik)	4:53
6.	"Mulungu"	2:03
7.	"Juju" (featuring Ghais Guevara and Michael Go)	4:35
8.	"Nfwiti" (featuring Michael Go)	4:27
9.	"Kumoto"	3:52
10.	"Mukazi"	3:21
Total length:		38:13
