= Dead Channel Sky =

Studio album by clipping.
- Released: March 14, 2025
- Length: 53:38
- Label: Sub Pop

clipping. chronology
Visions of Bodies Being Burned (2020)	Dead Channel Sky (2025)

Singles from Dead Channel Sky
- 1. "Run It" Released: September 12, 2024; 2. "Keep Pushing" Released: November 12, 2024; 3. "Change the Channel" Released: January 8, 2025; 4. "Welcome Home Warrior" Released: February 12, 2025

Singles from Dead Channel Sky Plus
- 1. "Night of Heaven" Released: July 16, 2025; 2. "Forever War" Released: August 14, 2025

Dead Channel Sky is the fifth studio album by American hip-hop group clipping. The album was released on March 14, 2025. It features guest appearances from Bitpanic, Nels Cline, Tia Nomore, Cartel Madras and Aesop Rock. The album fuses hip-hop with cyberpunk, departing from the horrorcore influenced sound of There Existed an Addiction to Blood and Visions of Bodies Being Burned. It received positive reviews from critics. An expanded version of the album, Dead Channel Sky Plus, was released on September 19, 2025 and was preceded by the singles "Night of Heaven" and "Forever War".

== Reception ==
Professional ratings
Aggregate scores
Source	Rating
Metacritic	82/100
Review scores
Source	Rating
AllMusic	4/5 stars
Clash	9/10
Paste	7.9/10
SputnikMusic	3.8/5

Dead Channel Sky received positive reviews from critics. Metacritic, which assigns a normalized rating out of 100 to reviews from mainstream critics, the album received an average score of 82 out of 100 from 10 critics, indicating "universal acclaim".

== Track listing ==
Dead Channel Sky track listing
No.	Title	Length
1.	"Intro"	0:51
2.	"Dominator"	2:31
3.	"Change the Channel"	2:15
4.	"Run It"	4:58
5.	"Go"	1:14
6.	"Simple Degradation (Plucks 1-13)" (with Bitpanic)	1:37
7.	"Code"	3:23
8.	"Dodger"	4:08
9.	"Malleus" (with Nels Cline)	1:56
10.	"Scams" (with Tia Nomore)	3:41
11.	"Keep Pushing"	3:46
12.	"'From Bright Bodies' (Interlude)"	0:46
13.	"Mood Organ"	1:41
14.	"Polaroids"	4:03
15.	"Simple Degradation (Plucks 14-18)" (with Bitpanic)	1:42
16.	"Madcap"	1:33
17.	"Mirrorshades pt. 2" (with Cartel Madras)	4:10
18.	"'And You Called' (Interlude)"	0:42
19.	"Welcome Home Warrior" (featuring Aesop Rock)	3:43
20.	"Ask What Happened"	4:50
Total length:		53:30

The CD release features a hidden track in the pre-gap before "Intro".

Dead Channel Sky Plus track listing
No.	Title	Length
1.	"Intro"	0:51
2.	"Dominator"	2:31
3.	"Change the Channel"	2:15
4.	"Run It"	4:58
5.	"Go"	1:14
6.	"Simple Degradation (Plucks 1-13)" (with Bitpanic)	1:37
7.	"Code"	3:23
8.	"Dodger"	4:08
9.	"Malleus" (with Nels Cline)	1:56
10.	"Mirrorshades pt. 1"	4:07
11.	"Scams" (with Tia Nomore)	3:41
12.	"Keep Pushing"	3:46
13.	"'From Bright Bodies' (Interlude)"	0:46
14.	"Mood Organ"	1:41
15.	"Forever War"	3:57
16.	"Polaroids"	4:03
17.	"Simple Degradation (Plucks 14-18)" (with Bitpanic)	1:42
18.	"Madcap"	1:33
19.	"Mirrorshades pt. 2" (with Cartel Madras)	4:10
20.	"'And You Called' (Interlude)"	0:42
21.	"Hard-Eyes"	1:16
22.	"Night of Heaven" (featuring Counterfeit Madison and Kid Koala)	3:50
23.	"Welcome Home Warrior" (featuring Aesop Rock)	3:43
24.	"Ask What Happened"	4:50
Total length:		66:40
