= Love and Affection for Stupid Little Bitches =

Studio album by Black Dresses
- Released: August 1, 2019
- Length: 30:20

Black Dresses chronology
Thank You (2019)	Love and Affection for Stupid Little Bitches (2019)	Peaceful as Hell (2020)

Love and Affection for Stupid Little Bitches is the third studio album by Canadian noise pop duo Black Dresses. Released on August 1, 2019, the album was their third in two years following Wasteisolation (2018) and Thank You (2019).

== Style and themes ==
Musically, the album contains elements of noise, pop, industrial, industrial metal, experimental music, and internet genres such as chillwave and vaporwave. The vocals on the album vary between screaming and sing-rapping. It explores themes such as finding friendship through times of hardship and pain, resilience and hope, identity, depression, and body horror.

== Reception ==
Professional ratings
Review scores
Source	Rating
Pitchfork	7.7/10

James Rettig of Stereogum felt that the album was more melodic than previous Black Dresses albums, and that the duo's production skills had improved "allowing more space and breathing room for some truly gorgeous moments to unfold." He concluded "It’s another stellar entry in a discography that shows no signs of slowing down." In a positive review for Pitchfork, Colin Joyce rated the album 7.7 out of 10, feeling that whilst the album was as heavy as previous albums, it was more positive in tone and felt "uplifting" and "triumphant". Joyce went on to reiterate his praise for the positivity of the album for Noisey's "The 22 Best Albums You May Have Missed in 2019", calling the album "a testament to the power of the music [Black Dresses] make together". Andrew Sacher, writing for BrooklynVegan, described the album as Black Dresses' most accessible so far, but felt that it still retained its experimentalism, calling it "genuinely fresh and genuinely confrontational in an era where it often feels like you've heard it all." Jordan Darville, writing for The Fader, praised the themes on the album and said that it showed "a capacity for merging noise and pop not heard since Nine Inch Nails."

== Accolades ==
Accolades for Love and Affection for Stupid Little Bitches
Publication	Accolade	Rank	Ref.
The Fader	Best Albums of 2019	—N/a	

== Track listing ==
All tracks are written by Devi McCallion and Ada Rook.

No.	Title	Length
1.	"Static"	2:16
2.	"Hertz"	3:53
3.	"Bloom"	4:22
4.	"Mindcrushed"	3:43
5.	"Cartoon Network"	2:38
6.	"Mutations"	3:15
7.	"Drool"	2:11
8.	"Music"	3:37
9.	"My Heart Beats out of Time"	2:36
Total length:		30:20
