= Midcity (album) =

Mixtape by Clipping
- Released: February 5, 2013
- Genre: Alternative hip hop; experimental hip hop; industrial hip hop; noise
- Length: 48:34
- Label: Self-released
- Producer: William Hutson; Jonathan Snipes

Clipping chronology
Midcity (2013)	CLPPNG (2014)

Professional ratings
Review scores
Source	Rating
Tiny Mix Tapes	4/5 stars

Midcity is the official debut mixtape by American experimental hip hop group Clipping. It was independently self-released on February 5, 2013.

== Track listing ==
Midcity track listing
No.	Title	Length
1.	"Intro"	2:17
2.	"Loud"	3:48
3.	"Bout That" (featuring Baseck)	3:55
4.	"Get It" (featuring Kill Rogers and TiVO)	3:00
5.	"Five"	2:45
6.	"Bullshit" (featuring Jalene Goodwin)	3:49
7.	"Overpass (Skit)"	1:05
8.	"Guns Up"	4:20
9.	"Mobb2it"	4:42
10.	"Killer" (featuring Kill Rogers)	3:22
11.	"Collect (Skit)"	0:58
12.	"Story"	3:16
13.	"Real" (featuring Ezra Buchla)	3:11
14.	"Outro"	10:46
Total length:		51:14

== Personnel ==
=== Clipping ===
- Daveed Diggs – vocals
- William Hutson – production
- Jonathan Snipes – production

=== Other personnel ===
- Derrick "Baseck" Estrada – vocals (3)
- TiVO – vocals (4)
- Kill Rogers – vocals (4 & 10)
- Jalene Goodwin – vocals (6)
- Ezra Buchla – vocals (13)
