= God Has Nothing to Do with This Leave Him Out of It =

Studio album by Backxwash
- Released: May 28, 2020
- Recorded: 2019–2020
- Genres: Horrorcore; trap metal; industrial hip-hop
- Length: 22:05
- Label: Grimalkin Records
- Producers: Backxwash; Will Owen Bennett; Fatherfake; Skin

Backxwash chronology
Deviancy (2019)	God Has Nothing to Do with This Leave Him Out of It (2020)	Stigmata EP (2020)

Singles from God Has Nothing to Do with This Leave Him Out of It
- 1. "Black Magic" Released: November 15, 2019

God Has Nothing to Do with This Leave Him Out of It is the second studio album by Zambian-Canadian rapper Backxwash. It was self-released on May 28, 2020, through Grimalkin Records. Production was primarily handled by Backxwash herself, along with Fatherfake, Skin, and Will Owen Bennett, who are featured on the project as well as Black Dresses and Malldate. The album won the 2020 Polaris Music Prize.

== Critical reception ==
Professional ratings
Review scores
Source	Rating
Exclaim!	9/10
Metal Hammer	4.5/5 stars

God Has Nothing to Do with This Leave Him Out of It was met with generally positive reviews from music critics. At Album of the Year, which assigns a normalized rating out of 100 to reviews from mainstream publications, the album received an average score of 88 based on four reviews.

Scott Simpson of Exclaim! wrote that "with most songs clocking in at under three minutes, this release has a real sense of immediacy and urgency while still managing to weave a compelling larger story". Merlin Alderslade of Metal Hammer praised the album, saying "the whole thing is barely more than 20 minutes long, and yet it's packing more ideas than many bands manage in an entire career. And it's fucking brilliant". Lloyd Best of God Is in the TV stated, "a raw and aggressive, mostly self-produced album with a level of honesty that is commendable and a showcase of skill that sets the bar high". Anthony Fantano said: "with its chilling mix of rap, goth, punk, and noise, God Has Nothing to Do With This has a huge impact for such a concise project".

=== Accolades ===
Publications' year-end list appearances for God Has Nothing to Do with This Leave Him Out of It
Critic/Publication	List	Rank	Ref
Exclaim!	Exclaim!'s 50 Best Albums of 2020	1	
God Is in the TV	GIITTV: Albums of the Year for 2020	26	
Louder Sound	The 50 Best Albums of 2020	34	
Metal Hammer	The 50 Best Metal Albums of 2020	27	
Paste	The 50 Best Albums of 2020	16	
The Wire	The Wire's Releases of the Year 2020	11	

== Track listing ==
God Has Nothing to Do with This Leave Him Out of It track listing
No.	Title	Producer(s)	Length
1.	"God Has Nothing to Do with This Leave Him Out of It"	Backxwash	1:52
2.	"Black Magic" (featuring Ada Rook)	Backxwash	3:38
3.	"Spells" (featuring Devi McCallion)	Backxwash	2:20
4.	"Black Sheep"	Backxwash	2:03
5.	"Hell's Interlude" (performed by Fatherfake)	Fatherfake	1:32
6.	"Into the Void" (featuring Malldate)	Backxwash	3:22
7.	"Adolescence"	Backxwash	1:23
8.	"Amen"	Backxwash	2:24
9.	"Heaven's Interlude" (performed by Skin)	Skin	1:00
10.	"Redemption" (featuring Will Owen Bennett)	Backxwash; Will Owen Bennett	2:31
Total length:			22:05

== Personnel ==
- Ashanti "Backxwash" Mutinta – main artist, vocals and producer (tracks 1–4, 6–8, 10), executive producer
- Ada Rook – featured artist (track 2), electric guitar
- Devi April McCallion – featured artist (track 3)
- Nikki "fatherfake" Baldwin – performer and producer (track 5)
- MallDate – featured artist (track 6), electric guitar
- Skin – performer and producer (track 9)
- Will Owen Bennett – featured artist and producer (track 10), executive producer
- Mechant Vaporwave – creative director
