= Splendor & Misery =

Studio album by clipping.
- Released: September 9, 2016
- Genre: Experimental hip-hop
- Length: 37:02
- Labels: Sub Pop, Deathbomb Arc
- Producers: William Hutson, Jonathan Snipes

Clipping. chronology
Wriggle (2016)	Splendor & Misery (2016)	There Existed an Addiction to Blood (2019)

Singles from Splendor & Misery
- 1. "Baby Don't Sleep" Released: July 26, 2016; 2. "Air 'Em Out" Released: August 23, 2016; 3. "True Believer" Released: April 4, 2017

Splendor & Misery is the second studio album by experimental hip-hop group clipping., released on September 9, 2016. The music video for "Baby Don't Sleep" was released on July 26, 2016. The second single and music video "Air 'Em Out" was released on August 24, 2016.

The album, with a mix of futuristic and classical instrumentation, tells the story of an enslaved person, referred to as Cargo #2331, in the future in outer space. It is an example of afrofuturism. Some of the songs also feature guest vocals from gospel group Take 6. The album was nominated for the Hugo Award for Best Dramatic Presentation, Short Form.

== Story ==
Most of the songs are written and delivered from the perspective of the artificial intelligence within the cargo ship and Cargo #2331, the only human still alive in the vessel. As a riot breaks out on the ship, Cargo #2331 enters the bridge and kills the original flight crew, leaving him stranded with only the computer to keep him company. The A.I. reports an S.O.S message, but after a prolonged amount of time watching him as he begins to suffer cabin fever, rapping to himself as he attempts to control and reroute the ship, it begins to express romantic feelings for #2331, and calls off the message, threatening to kill any pursuers. The A.I. implies that there are no habitable planets for him to reach. Eventually, #2331 begins to cause havoc on the ship to try to get the attention of the A.I. After this fails, the A.I. breaks from its limitations and berates him for lashing out at it, giving #2331 clarity to keep living and searching for a place to escape. In the end, the A.I. muses on the life #2331 misses, asking for confirmation several times before giving him random coordinates, and flying off as the album ends with abrasive noise.

== Themes and references to other works ==
The album explores themes of Afrofuturism, referencing several science fiction novels. These include the works of Ursula Le Guin, Octavia Butler and Samuel R. Delany (whose unfinished sequel to Stars in My Pocket Like Grains of Sand is titled The Splendor and Misery of Bodies, of Cities). A direct reference is made to Kendrick Lamar's verse from Big Sean's "Control".

== Critical reception ==
Professional ratings
Aggregate scores
Source	Rating
AnyDecentMusic?	7.3/10
Metacritic	76/100
Review scores
Source	Rating
AllMusic	4.5/5 stars
Clash	8/10
Exclaim!	7/10
The Irish Times	3/5 stars
The Line of Best Fit	6.5/10
Mojo	4/5 stars
Pitchfork	5.3/10
PopMatters	7/10
The Skinny	4/5 stars
Under the Radar	8/10

At Metacritic, which assigns a weighted average score out of 100 to reviews from mainstream critics, the album received an average score of 76% based on 11 reviews, indicating "generally favorable reviews".

PopMatters named it the 4th best hip-hop album of 2016, while Stereogum named it the 40th best rap album of 2016.

The album was nominated for the 2017 Hugo Award for Best Dramatic Presentation, Short Form, the second time ever for a music album following 1970's Blows Against the Empire by Paul Kantner and Jefferson Starship. In 2019 Pitchfork ranked Splendor & Misery as the 30th greatest industrial album of all time.

== Track listing ==
All tracks are written by clipping.

Face A
No.	Title	Length
1.	"Long Way Away (Intro)"	1:05
2.	"The Breach"	0:56
3.	"All Black"	6:15
4.	"Interlude 01 (Freestyle)"	1:35
5.	"Wake Up"	2:05
6.	"Long Way Away"	1:30
7.	"Interlude 02 (Numbers)"	1:04
8.	"True Believer"	3:44

Face B
No.	Title	Length
1.	"Long Way Away (Instrumental)"	0:51
2.	"Air 'Em Out"	3:50
3.	"Interlude 03 (Freestyle)"	1:09
4.	"Break the Glass"	2:21
5.	"Story 5"	3:04
6.	"Baby Don't Sleep"	3:07
7.	"A Better Place"	4:26
Total length:		37:02

== Personnel ==
Clipping

- Daveed Diggs – lead and backing vocals; recording, art direction, design
- William Hutson – sound effects, production, recording, art direction, design
- Jonathan Snipes – sound effects, production, recording, art direction, design

Additional production

- Steve Kaplan – recording, mixing
- Reuben Cohen – mastering
- Jay Shaw – cover art

Additional musicians

- Paul Outlaw – vocals on "Long Way Away (Intro)" and "True Believer"
- Graham Stephenson – trumpet on "All Black"
- Take 6 – vocals on "Long Way Away", "True Believer", and "Story 5"
  - Alvin Chea – bass
  - Claude McKnight – first tenor
  - David Thomas – second tenor
- Dorian Holley – vocals on "Long Way Away", "True Believer", and "Story 5"
- John W. Snyder – piano on "Long Way Away (Instrumental)", vocal arrangement on "Long Way Away", "True Believer", and "Story 5"
- Kevin Lee – theremin on "Long Way Away (Instrumental)"
- Cyrus Rex – additional synthesizers on "Interlude 03 (Freestyle)"

== Charts ==
Chart (2016)	Peak position
US Heatseekers Albums (Billboard)	2
US Independent Albums (Billboard)	30
US Top R&B/Hip-Hop Albums (Billboard)	16
US Top Rap Albums (Billboard)	13
