= Schwarzfahrer =

1993 film

- Poster
- Directed by: Pepe Danquart
- Written by: Pepe Danquart
- Produced by: Albert Kitzler
- Starring: Senta Moira; Paul Outlaw; Stefan Merki; Klaus Tilsner
- Cinematography: Ciro Cappellari
- Edited by: Mona Bräuer
- Music by: Albert Kitzler
- Production company: Trans-Film
- Distributed by: Der KurzFilmVerleih
- Release date: February 11, 1993 (Berlin International Film Festival)
- Running time: 12 minutes
- Country: Germany
- Language: German

Schwarzfahrer (also known as Black Rider) is a 1993 German 12-minute short film directed by Pepe Danquart. It won an Oscar in 1994 for Best Short Subject. The topic of the film is the daily racism a black man endures in a tram. The title is a word-play: "Schwarzfahrer" usually means "fare-dodger" in German, but can be literally translated as "black traveler". This word-play forms the punch line of the short film.

== Plot ==
A motorbiker (Stefan Merki), who early in the film was unable to start his motorcycle, boards a tram in Berlin, and witnesses a black man (Paul Outlaw) sitting down next to an elderly white woman (Senta Moira). In the entire 12 minutes, the old woman racially abuses the black man, stating that blacks stink, are unintelligent, criminal and the perfect carrier for AIDS. The biker feels uncomfortable, but does not dare to interrupt. The black man stays quiet for the entire film, until a ticket inspector boards the tram. When the old woman readies her ticket for inspection, he grabs and swallows it. When the old woman accuses the black man of eating her ticket, he coolly shows his valid ticket to the inspector; the latter nods at him and detains the old woman. The punch line is that both the black man and the old woman are "Schwarzfahrer" now: the black man who rides a train, is a non-offensive "black rider", while the old woman now is a real law-breaking Schwarzfahrer (i.e. fare dodger). The one passenger the viewer knows who never possessed a ticket, the motorbiker, escapes without the controller checking his ticket.

== Cast ==
- Senta Moira as the Old Woman
- Paul Outlaw as the Black Man
- Stefan Merki as the Biker
- Klaus Tilsner as the ticket controller
- Andreas Schmidt as passenger with walkman

== Acclaim ==
- 1994 Academy Award for Live Action Short Film — won
- 1993 Melbourne International Film Festival Best Live Action Short Film — won
