= Lauren Bousfield =

American experimental musician

- Also known as: Nero's Day at Disneyland
- Origin: Oakland, California, U.S.
- Genres: Indie electronic; electro-industrial; breakcore; synth punk
- Occupations: Library musician, composer
- Instruments: Piano; Modular synthesizers
- Years active: 2005–2011, 2026-present (as Nero's Day at Disneyland); 2012–present (as Lauren Bousfield)
- Labels: Cock Rock Disco: Audio Savant Deathbomb Arc Orange Milk Records
- Member of: Nero's Day at Disneyland; In-House Pharmacy; DOOR EATER
- Formerly of: Beautiful Mutants; Strip Mall Seizures; Self Spiller
- Website: https://www.laurenbousfield.com

Lauren Bousfield is an electronic musician, composer, and sound designer based in Los Angeles. She initially gained recognition for her project Nero's Day at Disneyland, and has since released music under her own name, and as part of the duos In-House Pharmacy and DOOR EATER. Bousfield also composes music for television, film, and video games.

== Life and career ==
=== Early life and Nero's Day at Disneyland ===
Bousfield was raised in Southern California. Both of her parents are musicians, and she grew up playing piano, which she still considers to be her primary instrument. Bousfield's musical career began by playing in the punk bands Beautiful Mutants and Strip Mall Seizures. Her earliest solo music, released in the mid-2000s under the name Nero's Day at Disneyland, has been described as "bombastic" and a "sci-fi take on Switched-On Bach", with "almost circus-like melodies". The final Nero's Day at Disneyland album, 2009's From Rotting Fantasylands, gained a cult following. This earlier music has been described as a "prescient" forerunner to the electronic music of the 2020s, which "helped set the stage for the post-PC Music style known as hyperpop".

=== More recent work ===
Since 2012, beginning with the EP Locked Into Phantasy, Bousfield has released music under her own name. Her 2016 album Avalon Vales was described by Daniel Jones of Electronic Beats as a "grown-up" version of the punk music that she had played earlier in her career, while retaining the "deft manipulation of chamber music samples and the chaotic catchiness" seen in Nero's Day at Disneyland.

Around that time, Bousfield worked for Hans Zimmer's Remote Control Productions on films such as Batman v Superman: Dawn of Justice and Kung Fu Panda 3 (both 2016). She later stated in June 2021 that she was fired soon after she transitioned.

In 2017, Bousfield released the EP Fire Songs, which was made after the 2016 Ghost Ship warehouse fire and a house fire in her own home. The EP's opening track honors Joey Casio, a friend of Bousfield and fellow musician who died in the Ghost Ship fire.

In 2018, Bousfield and her wife Naomi Mitchell released Tetsuo: The Iron Man Revisited, a rescored soundtrack to that movie, under the name In-House Pharmacy. (Bousfield and Mitchell had previously collaborated on the closing track of Fire Songs, titled "Cirlgocks".) As of 2025, there have been two further releases by In-House Pharmacy: We Are Electronics and Piano Only in 2020, and the single Stochastic Violence in 2022.

In 2020, Bousfield released the album Palimpsest. It was positively reviewed by Paul Simpson of AllMusic as "her most accomplished work to date", "filled with corkscrew breakbeats and torrential noise eruptions, but with a cinematic scope and a pop lifeblood coursing through it all."

In 2023, Bousfield released the album Salesforce to positive reviews from critics. Claire Biddles, writing for The Wire, praised the way in which "[the album's] breakneck intricacy ironically mirrors our high speed, everything all of the time culture". Sam Goldner of Pitchfork described her style as "aggressively berserk", while noting that "overload feels like exactly the point", and praised Salesforce as a "thrilling" commentary on capitalism. Paul Simpson of AllMusic wrote a similarly positive review, describing the album as "even busier and more densely constructed" than some of her previous releases, and noted that some songs "push the limits of what can be considered pop".

In 2025, Bousfield and Ada Rook (who had previously collaborated on the song Hazer from Salesforce) announced their noise pop project DOOR EATER, whose debut album try released in June 2025. Bousfield has also collaborated with musicians such as clipping. and Devi McCallion.

=== Style and themes ===
Bousfield's music has been noted for its chaotic, harsh sound, which she uses to "poetically illustrate… hopelessness in the age of late capitalism". In a 2023 interview with The Wire she explained that "at least a little bit of ‘fuck you’ in music is important to me," as a way to "resist capitalism". However, Bousfield has stated the most important theme in her work is above all hope, and that she aims to "to make people who feel powerless feel powerful".

Since her earliest releases as Nero's Day at Disneyland, Bousfield has cited a fascination with North American amusement culture as inspiration for her work; in particular, she is "pretty obsessed" with Disneyland. While in college Bousfield studied the sociology of amusement parks.

Bousfield's queer identity also plays an important role in her art, and she has stated that she wants to make music for “young, upset, specifically trans kids”.

== Discography ==
=== With Beautiful Mutants ===
==== Studio albums ====
- Rock and Roll Mind Control (circa 1998)
- Who Feeds on Whom (circa. 1999)
- Beautiful Mutants (circa. 2000)

=== With Strip Mall Seizures ===
==== Studio albums ====
- Strip Mall Seizures (2003)
- No English (2006)
- Secret To Financial Freedom (2008)
- I'll Never Give Up On You (2011)

=== As Lauren VS. Fern ===
- Carnival Infernale (circa 2012)

=== As Nero's Day at Disneyland ===
==== Studio albums ====
- Attention Shoppers (2005)
- From Rotting Fantasylands (2009)

==== EPs ====
- Grievances and Dead Malls (2005)
- Colonists (2007)
- Grand Reopening EP (2026)

==== Singles ====
- Mascara Running Everywhere (2010)
- Bent Chorals feat. Mincemeat or Tenspeed (2010)
- Heaven's Gate (2011)
- Sable Leathery Wings (2011)
- øBabylon (2026)
- Ghost Debt (2026)

==== Other Releases ====
- The Fruit Will Rot, Vol. 3 - Disc G (2007) [Compilation Appearance]
- Trickle Down Economixxx (2008) [DJ Mix/Mixtape]

=== In Self Spiller ===
==== Studio albums ====
- Worms In The Keys (2012)
- Worms In The Keys Remixes (2017)

==== Singles ====
- Fountain Of Blood (2014)

=== As Lauren Bousfield ===
==== Studio albums ====
- Avalon Vales (2013)
- Namazu Running OST (2016)
- Palimpsest (2020)
- Salesforce (2023)

==== EPs ====
- Locked into Phantasy (2012)
- Fire Songs (2017)

==== Singles ====
- Valed (2013)
- Dead Eyes (2016)
- Clocked (2016)
- Slow Slicing - Klonopin (2016)
- Flying High feat. Skylla (2016)
- Scold's Bridle (2016)
- Fukup feat. Skylla (2016)
- Used to Be Better feat. Girls Rituals (2017)
- Press Fire from No World Dreamers: Sticky Zeitgeist (2017)
- Crawling Into a Fireplace Cackling (2020)
- Forest Theme (2021)
- Swamp Theme (2021)
- Irl Theme (2021)
- Headstone Prices on Credit (2023)
- Mansions No One Wants to Buy for Any Price (2023)
- Hazer (2023)
- White Clouds Turning Black Factory Farm Flames In The Distance (2024)

==== Mixes ====
- Lauren Bousfield @ 909 Fest (2020)
- Lauren Bousfield - Worst Macys Thanksgiving Day Parade Accidents!! (2021)
- Lauren Bousfield - 7/22/21 - HausMo Fun One: July Edition (2021)
- Lauren Bousfield Dublab Set 6.14.23 (2023)

==== Video games ====
- Money for Girls: Amortized (2026)

=== As In House Pharmacy ===
==== EPs ====
- Tetsuo: The Iron Man Revisited (2018)
- We Are Electronics and Piano Only (2020)
- In-House Pharmacy B-sides 001 (2020)

==== Singles ====
- Thunder and Rain (2021)
- Stochastic Violence (2022)

=== As DOOR EATER ===
==== Singles ====
- stay out (2025)
- dead sky (2025)
- lifeblood (2025)

==== Albums ====
- try (2025)
