= Grypt =

- Origin: Los Angeles, CA
- Genres: Dark pop, witch house, industrial
- Years active: 2012–present
- Labels: Deathbomb Arc; Cleopatra Records; Tundra Dubs
- Members: Romie Romak; Taylor Shechet; Myrrh Ka Ba
- Website: www.grypt.me

Grypt (stylized as GRYPT) is a multimedia horror-themed dark pop band from Los Angeles, California, best known for their hybridization of music with indie video games and interactive fiction. Described as "sound designers" and "interactive storytellers", they have released a "persistently disturbing" online choose your own adventure text game, horror audio dramas and, in collaboration with Duende Games, a "death simulator" music videogame (in contrast to a music video) entitled Tonight You Die, which was featured in Rock Paper Shotgun, Kill Screen, and selected as a PC Gamer free game of the week. They have also released music on labels Deathbomb Arc, Cleopatra Records, and Tundra Dubs.
