= Forever in Your Heart =

- Cover Art by Bani-Chan

Studio album by Black Dresses
- Released: February 14, 2021
- Genres: Electronic; digital hardcore
- Length: 48:38
- Label: Blacksquares

Black Dresses chronology
Peaceful as Hell (2020)	Forever in Your Heart (2021)	Forget Your Own Face (2022)

Forever in Your Heart is the fifth studio album by Canadian noise pop duo Black Dresses. Released on February 14, 2021 by Blacksquares Records, it was their first album since the band broke up in May 2020 just weeks after the release of their previous album Peaceful as Hell in April 2020. The duo cited harassment directed towards band member Devi McCallion by fans as the reason for the disbandment. The album was announced via a tweet in which the duo clarified that they were still disbanded, saying "We’re no longer a band unfortunately. Regardless, we’ve decided to keep putting out music." The album consists of songs recorded in 2020, but it was not revealed whether it was recorded before or after the breakup of the band.

== Style and themes ==
Musically, the album contains elements of industrial metal, digital hardcore, EDM, glitch, and pop music. These elements include screamed vocals, distortion, industrial percussion, and metal guitars. Lyrically, the album explores themes of alienation, isolation, apathy, dissociation, anxiety, the political climate, and the pressures of conformity that the duo have felt as a result of being trans women, as well as tranquility and beauty.

== Reception ==
Professional ratings
Review scores
Source	Rating
Exclaim!	9/10
The Needle Drop	8/10
Pitchfork	7.6/10

In a positive review for Pitchfork, Colin Joyce felt that the album was heavier and more upsetting compared with Peaceful as Hell, but also noted themes of hope and tranquility which made the darker subject matter feel "cathartic and transformative". Aly Laube of Exclaim! praised the mixing of genres on the album as well as the sincerity of the lyrics, concluding that "Forever in Your Heart is the freakish magnum opus of Black Dresses, sure to inspire the next generation of experimental musicians and fans." Anthony Fantano of The Needle Drop felt that the album sounded "beautiful and uniquely unforgiving" and described the album as "15 blistering tracks that push the duo's versatility and harshness to new heights". Hal Kitchen of 25YL felt that the album was darker in tone and more pessimistic than Peaceful as Hell, and that this was reflected in the "extremely tortured and explosive qualities" to the sound of the album. However, he also felt that the darkness of the album was tempered by the chemistry between the duo, concluding "Forever in Your Heart offers a dystopian vision of a world to come, one redeemed only by how exciting, surprising, and uniquely human the album expressing such a vision remains."

The song "PEACESIGN!!!!!!!!!!!!!!!!!" was featured on The Fader's "The 20 best rock songs right now" February 2021 list.

== Accolades ==
Publication	Accolade	Rank	Ref.
25YL	Top 50 Albums of 2021	1	
Bandcamp Daily	Bandcamp Daily Staffers on Their Favorite Albums of 2021 – Zoe Camp	—N/a	
The Needle Drop	50 Best Albums of 2021	23	
Paste	The 20 Best Electronic Albums of 2021	—N/a	

== Track listing ==
All tracks are written by Devi McCallion and Ada Rook.

No.	Title	Length
1.	"PEACESIGN!!!!!!!!!!!!!!!!!"	3:28
2.	"Concrete Bubble"	3:34
3.	"Bulldozer"	2:56
4.	"Heaven"	3:08
5.	"Tiny Ball"	2:15
6.	"Silver Bells"	3:11
7.	"Ragequitted"	3:03
8.	"Waiting42moro"	3:27
9.	"Gone In An Instant"	2:59
10.	"We'll Figure It Out"	2:59
11.	"Understanding"	4:53
12.	"Perfect Teeth"	3:06
13.	"Zero Ultra"	3:31
14.	"Mistake"	2:04
15.	"(Can't) Keep It Together"	3:58
Total length:		48:38
