= Forget Your Own Face =

Studio album by Black Dresses
- Released: February 14, 2022
- Genre: Industrial noise pop
- Length: 20:03
- Label: Blacksquares

Black Dresses chronology
Forever in Your Heart (2021)	Forget Your Own Face (2022)	Laughingfish (2024)

Singles from Forget Your Own Face
- 1. "u_u2" Released: February 1, 2022

Forget Your Own Face is the sixth studio album by Canadian noise pop duo Black Dresses. It was released on February 14, 2022, exactly one year after the release of their previous album Forever in Your Heart, and is the second album released by the duo since their announced disbandment in May 2020. With the release of Forever in Your Heart, the duo clarified that they had nonetheless not reunited as a band, and The Fader described Forget Your Own Face as a continuation of their "not-reunion". Released under Blacksquares Records, the album was preceded by the Patreon-only release of the song "u_u2" on February 1.

== Style and themes ==
Musically, Forget Your Own Face is an industrial noise pop album, and contains features of hyperpop, industrial hip hop, dream pop and screamo. The album is dark and angry in tone, featuring criticism of cultural appropriation, the societal backlash against trans people and contemporary pop culture, as well as disses towards RuPaul and Travis Barker. According to Hannah Jocelyn of Pitchfork, Black Dresses' antagonism towards Barker is fueled by a fear of the commodification of hyperpop pushing the progenitors of the genre offline.

== Reception ==
Professional ratings
Review scores
Source	Rating
The Needle Drop	8/10
Pitchfork	7.2/10

Hannah Jocelyn of Pitchfork felt that the album was "lighter" and "less introspective" than their previous emotionally heavy and personal albums, and praised the camaraderie between band members Ada Rook and Devi McCallion. James Rettig of Stereogum described the album as "brief and explosive" and said that it is "deliriously fun while also being a little terrifying". Anthony Fantano of The Needle Drop felt that the album was more pessimistic than the duo's previous albums and thought that it seemed to continue past themes to a "very strong explosive finishing point". Overall, he opined that it contained "some of the duo's most explosive and imperative material to date". Hal Kitchen of 25YL argued that the chemistry between Rook and McCallion on the album gave it "emotional expressiveness" and a sense of genuineness, and praised their use of unconventional song structure and the catchiness of their lyrics. He concluded "Black Dresses is the best band in the world right now. Their aesthetic and perspective are one of a kind, their performances utterly committed, and their songwriting skills light-years ahead of their contemporaries." Writing for Beats Per Minute, John Amen gave the album a score of 73% and commented, "Released during a time when distinctions between life and performance have been all but erased, when grief and anger seem inseparable, Forget Your Own Face is a timely sequence, oozing cynicism and a dystopian bent."

== Accolades ==
Publication	Accolade	Rank	Ref.
Louder	Team Louder's best alternative albums of 2022 – Dom Lawson	9	
The Needle Drop	50 Best Albums of 2022	49	
Revolver	10 Best Non-Metal Albums for Metalheads of 2022	—N/a	

== Track listing ==
All tracks are written by Devi McCallion and Ada Rook.

No.	Title	Length
1.	"u_u2"	2:38
2.	"Let's Be"	2:05
3.	"Earth worm"	2:05
4.	"No Normal"	2:25
5.	"Doomspiral"	3:37
6.	"Money Makes You Stupid"	2:46
7.	"Gay Ugly and Hard to Understand"	2:44
8.	"Nightwish"	1:43
Total length:		20:03
