= Only Dust Remains =

Studio album by Backxwash
- Released: March 28, 2025
- Genres: Conscious hip-hop; alternative hip-hop
- Length: 40:51
- Label: Ugly Hag Records
- Producer: Ashanti Mutinta

Backxwash chronology
His Happiness Shall Come First Even Though We Are Suffering (2022)	Only Dust Remains (2025)

Singles from Only Dust Remains
- 1. "Wake Up" Released: April 17, 2024; 2. "9th Heaven" Released: February 27, 2025

Only Dust Remains is the fifth studio album by the Zambian-Canadian rapper Backxwash. It was self-released through Ugly Hag Records on March 28, 2025.

== Release ==
In October 2024, Backxwash announced that she would be releasing a new album, with a release date set for February 2025. The album was to include the single "Wake Up", which she had released earlier that year, on April 17, 2024. Only Dust Remains was officially announced on January 28, 2025. On February 27, she released the single "9th Heaven" from the album. Backxwash released Only Dust Remains on March 28, 2025, through her label Ugly Hag Records.

== Critical reception ==
Only Dust Remains ratings
Aggregate scores
Source	Rating
Metacritic	86/100
Review scores
Source	Rating
Beats Per Minute	76/100
Cult MTL	9/10
Kerrang!	4/5 stars
The Needle Drop	9/10 (Note: Specifically, Fantano rated the album a "strong 8 to a light 9".)
Paste	9.3/10
Sputnikmusic	4.4/5

According to the review aggregator Metacritic, Only Dust Remains received "universal acclaim" based on a weighted average score of 86 out of 100 from 5 critic scores. Mischa Pearlman of Kerrang! called it "a morbid, bleak and brilliant post-trilogy album" and further described it as "a dark album. A very dark album," yet highlighted its global awareness, with tracks like "History of Violence" mixing personal pain with political trauma. Pearlman concluded Only Dust Remains as a "brave, powerful and uncompromising album that holds nothing back". Anthony Fantano praised Backxwash's creative evolution, noting that the album features "more of those different sides of her that we caught just a tiny, teensy-weensy bit of on the last record". John Amen of Beats Per Minute wrote, "Mutinta isn’t retracting her take on the world; she’s unapologetic in her condemnation of our institutions and the way they impact our sense of worth (and/or lack of it). At the same time, she’s researching new sonic directions as well as a somewhat more paradoxical take on human life". He concluded, "Dust is ultimately a 'between' project; we’ll see where it leads".

The album was longlisted for the 2025 Polaris Music Prize.

=== Accolades ===
Publication	Accolade	Rank	Ref.
HotNewHipHop	The 40 Best Rap Albums Of 2025	28	
Metal Hammer	Top 50 Albums of 2025	28	
Paste	The 25 best rap albums of 2025	4	
The Quietus	Albums of the Year 2025	58	
The Wire	Releases of the Year 2025	24	

== Track listing ==
No.	Title	Length
1.	"Black Lazarus"	4:58
2.	"Wake Up"	7:08
3.	"Undesirable"	3:23
4.	"9th Gate"	1:16
5.	"9th Heaven"	4:21
6.	"Dissociation" (featuring Chloe Hotline)	5:02
7.	"History Of Violence"	5:14
8.	"Stairway To Heaven" (featuring Ora Cogan)	3:27
9.	"Love After Death"	1:14
10.	"Only Dust Remains" (featuring pet wife, MAGELLA, Fernie, Morgan-Paige)	4:45
