= Wasteisolation =

Studio album by Black Dresses
- Released: April 13, 2018
- Recorded: 2017–2018
- Genre: Electro-industrial; noise
- Length: 42:45

Black Dresses chronology
Wasteisolation (2018)	Thank You (2019)

Wasteisolation (stylized in all caps) is the debut studio album by Canadian noise pop duo Black Dresses, released on April 13, 2018.

== Recording and release ==
The album was recorded between late 2017 and early 2018 and was created entirely through online collaboration with audio files being sent between band members Ada Rook and Devi McCallion via Twitter direct messages. The album was released on April 13, 2018. Dreams Come True 2019, an EP of Wasteisolation remixes, was released for its first anniversary, and the duo's fourth studio album Peaceful as Hell was later released on its second anniversary.

== Style and themes ==
Musically, the album has been described as noise pop and industrial pop, and was inspired by noise and pop music of the 2010s such as Sleigh Bells and Linkin Park. The album explores themes such as child sexual abuse, trauma, isolation, existence, rage, transmisogyny, and politicians' use of the term "thoughts and prayers". The treatment of themes such as trauma on the album has been described as hopeful and cathartic, and McCallion said that they had aimed "for people to resonate with it if they’ve been in that dark place" when covering such themes.

== Reception ==
=== Critical reception ===
James Rettig of Stereogum felt that the album was catchy and danceable, and praised the queer themes on the album concluding "That back-and-forth struggle should be familiar to anyone who identifies as queer: the pull between just wanting to exist and not wanting to die. That’s the experience that WASTEISOLATION captures best, in all its grotesque and beautiful glory." Sasha Geffen of The Fader described the album as "raw, abrasive, and deliriously catchy" and said that its songs "offer comfort and catharsis not because they promise that everything will get better but because they show you how to riot through hell."

The album was featured in Noisey's July "40 Essential Albums You Probably Missed So Far in 2018" list in which Colin Joyce praised the album's musical style and heavy lyrical themes, and felt that despite these heavy themes "[McCallion] and Rook find some hope embedded in the chaos. Even at their most frayed, they feel triumphant, somehow." Nylon included the album on their list of 11 Unapologetically Queer Albums You Might Have Missed This Summer and summarised the album saying "More punk than any album with guitars, Black Dresses uses glitchy soundscapes and guttural moaning to express the desperation of trans women who just want to be left the fuck alone." The Fader described the song "Wiggle" as a standout track, listing it as one of their "20 songs you're sleeping on right now" list in April 2018.

=== Public response ===
The album was a viral success on the video-sharing website TikTok. The success of songs on the album led to invasion of privacy and extended harassment against McCallion by what the duo described as "entitled fans", eventually leading to the disbandment of the duo in 2020.

== Accolades ==
Accolades for Wasteisolation
Publication	Accolade	Rank	Ref.
Noisey	The 100 Best Albums of 2018	16	
Stereogum	The 50 Best Albums Of 2018 So Far	25	

== Track listing ==
All tracks are written by Devi McCallion and Ada Rook.

No.	Title	Length
1.	"Doorway"	1:38
2.	"Go Inside"	2:14
3.	"Eternal Nausea"	2:32
4.	"In My Mouth"	3:03
5.	"Tell Me How U Feel"	2:12
6.	"Thoughts and Prayers"	4:27
7.	"I'm Earth"	2:43
8.	"Wiggle"	3:57
9.	"Dreaming"	3:47
10.	"Legacy"	3:26
11.	"Runner"	4:24
12.	"Wound"	2:55
13.	"Slither"	5:23
Total length:		42:45

== Track listing (remix EP) ==
All tracks are written by Devi McCallion and Ada Rook.

No.	Title	Length
1.	"Wiggle 2019"	3:36
2.	"Nausea 2019"	2:46
3.	"Go Inside 2019"	2:40
4.	"Dreams Come True"	3:24
Total length:		12:27
