= Wriggle (EP) =

EP by clipping.
- Released: June 14, 2016
- Genre: Industrial hip hop
- Length: 19:58
- Label: Sub Pop
- Producer: clipping.

Clipping. chronology
CLPPNG (2014)	Wriggle (2016)	Splendor & Misery (2016)

Wriggle is the debut EP by American experimental hip hop group clipping. Released on June 14, 2016, through Sub Pop record label, it features appearances from artists such as Antwon and Cakes da Killa. The EP consists of tracks that were originally recorded for the group's 2014 debut album CLPPNG but could not be finished in time for its release.

For the track "Shooter", the band recorded themselves firing 15 different guns. The music video for the title track, which is based on a sample from British power electronics band Whitehouse's '"Wriggle Like a Fucking Eel", was directed by Rodney Ascher and released on June 29, 2016.

On May 12, 2021, the band released an "Expanded" edition of the EP, containing the original versions of all tracks except "Back Up" in addition to five new remixes. The new version of "Back Up", entitled "Back Up 2021" features rapper Debby Friday instead of Antwon. Antwon later formed a group with rappers Wiki and Lil Ugly Mane, but broke up in 2018 due to allegations of abuse towards women from Antwon.

== Critical reception ==
Professional ratings
Review scores
Source	Rating
AllMusic	3.5/5 stars
Tiny Mix Tapes	3/5 stars

Tiny Mix Tapes critic Frank Falisi wrote: "Nothing about Wriggle is especially venomous, given the noise of the band’s previous creations, as well as their explicit intentions."

Reviewing the 2021 re-release for AllMusic, Paul Simpson claimed that "in its updated state, Wriggle feels like more of a deconstruction of clipping.'s influences and techniques than their more conceptual full-lengths, highlighting their skills at inventive genre fusions and audacious sonic engineering."

== Track listing ==
2016 original release
No.	Title	Length
1.	"Intro"	0:51
2.	"Shooter"	3:27
3.	"Back Up" (featuring Antwon and Signor Benedick the Moor)	3:52
4.	"Wriggle"	4:04
5.	"Hot Fuck No Love" (featuring Cakes da Killa and Maxi Wild)	3:29
6.	"Our Time" (featuring Nailah Middleton)	4:15
Total length:		19:58

2021 "expanded" version
No.	Title	Length
1.	"Intro"	0:53
2.	"Shooter"	3:29
3.	"Back Up 2021" (featuring Debby Friday and Signor Benedick the Moor)	4:00
4.	"Wriggle"	4:04
5.	"Hot Fuck No Love" (featuring Cakes Da Killa and Maxi Wild)	3:31
6.	"Our Time" (featuring Nailah Middleton)	4:15
7.	"Wriggle (Homemade Weapons Remix)"	4:17
8.	"Back Up (Dave Quam Remix)"	3:29
9.	"Shooter (Jana Rush's Face Rearranged Remix)"	4:57
10.	"Wriggle (Cardopusher's EBM Remix)"	5:18
Total length:		38:16

Notes

- This is the Bandcamp digital release of this version. The vinyl LP release drops "Intro" and substitutes "Hot Fuck No Love (Jana Rush's Naughty Bitch Remix)" for her remix of "Shooter".
