= CLPPNG =

Studio album by clipping.
- Released: June 10, 2014
- Genres: Underground hip-hop; experimental hip-hop; musique concrète
- Length: 55:31
- Label: Sub Pop
- Producers: William Hutson, Jonathan Snipes

Clipping. chronology
Midcity (2013)	CLPPNG (2014)	Wriggle (2016)

CLPPNG is the debut studio album by American hip-hop group clipping. It was released on June 10, 2014, through Sub Pop as the follow-up to their debut mixtape Midcity. The album has guest appearances from Gangsta Boo, King T, Cocc Pistol Cree, Guce, Mariel Jacoda and Tom Erbe.

Professional ratings
Aggregate scores
Source	Rating
AnyDecentMusic?	7.3/10
Metacritic	73/100
Review scores
Source	Rating
AllMusic	2.5/5 stars
DIY	4/5 stars
Exclaim!	9/10
Fact	3.5/5
Financial Times	4/5 stars
The Irish Times	4/5 stars
Mojo	4/5 stars
NME	8/10
Pitchfork	5.6/10
Uncut	8/10

== Composition ==
Thomas Quinlan of Exclaim! writes that the album sees the group continue their combination of musique concrète and gangsta rap, while deeming it more accessible than their earlier work. Fred Thomas of AllMusic deems it a harsh album that fuses "noise frequencies, brutally dark beats, and MC Daveed Diggs' unhinged, often ugly lyrical flow." "Intro" features rapping over a beatless backdrop of feedback reminiscent of Merzbow. "Dream" features a "ringing bell, white noise and tape hiss", while the next track "Get Up" is built solely around the sound of an alarm clock. The album also features a performance of John Cage's Williams Mix (1951–1953), recorded with Tom Erbe.

== Track listing ==
All tracks are written by clipping..

CLPPNG track listing
No.	Title	Length
1.	"Intro" (Not featured on vinyl release due to extended intro on "Body & Blood.")	1:04
2.	"Body & Blood"	4:28
3.	"Work Work" (featuring Cocc Pistol Cree)	3:41
4.	"Summertime" (featuring King T)	4:02
5.	"Taking Off"	4:49
6.	"Tonight" (featuring Gangsta Boo)	4:35
7.	"Dream"	5:29
8.	"Get Up" (featuring Mariel Jacoda)	2:55
9.	"Or Die" (featuring Guce)	4:05
10.	"Inside Out"	3:36
11.	"Story 2"	2:11
12.	"Dominoes"	5:58
13.	"Ends" (Not featured on vinyl release.)	5:25
14.	"Williams Mix" (featuring Tom Erbe)	4:22

Vinyl edition (bonus track)
No.	Title	Length
13.	"Run Out"	4:50

Japanese edition (bonus tracks)
No.	Title	Length
15.	"Brian" (featuring Brian Chippendale)	3:55
16.	"God Given Tongue" (featuring Bryan Lewis Saunders)	8:05

== Charts ==
Chart (2014)	Peak position
US Heatseekers Albums (Billboard)	22
US Top R&B/Hip-Hop Albums (Billboard)	46
