= There Existed an Addiction to Blood =

Studio album by clipping.
- Released: October 18, 2019
- Recorded: 2014–2019
- Genres: Experimental hip-hop; industrial hip-hop; horrorcore; noise rap
- Length: 68:37
- Label: Sub Pop

Clipping. chronology
Splendor & Misery (2016)	There Existed an Addiction to Blood (2019)	Visions of Bodies Being Burned (2020)

Singles from There Existed an Addiction to Blood
- 1. "Nothing Is Safe" Released: August 14, 2019; 2. "La Mala Ordina" Released: September 12, 2019; 3. "Blood of the Fang" Released: October 3, 2019

There Existed an Addiction to Blood is the third studio album by American hip-hop group clipping. It was released on October 18, 2019, on Sub Pop. It received mostly positive reviews from music critics.

== Music and lyrics ==
Clipping described There Existed an Addiction to Blood in a press release as a "transmutation of horrorcore", continuing that it "absorbs the hyper-violent horror tropes of the Murder Dog era, but re-imagines them in a new light: still darkly-tinted and somber, but in a weirder and more vivid hue". Throughout the album, Daveed Diggs describes "gruesome movie scenarios", but, according to the Financial Times journalist Ludovic Hunter-Tilney, the lyrics do not contain the "sick [humor]" and misogyny associated with the genre. Diggs speaks in the second person in the tracks, which Tom Breihan of Stereogum interpreted to be in order to do "everything he can to put us, the listeners, in the shoes of the victims".

The album title comes from the Sam Waymon song "The Blood of Thing (Part 2) Shadow of the Cross", written for the vampire film Ganja & Hess. This song is also sampled in "Blood of the Fang".

== Critical reception ==
Professional ratings
Aggregate scores
Source	Rating
AnyDecentMusic?	7.6/10
Metacritic	73/100
Review scores
Source	Rating
AllMusic	4/5 stars
Clash	8/10
Financial Times	4/5 stars
The Line of Best Fit	8/10
Loud and Quiet	7/10
Paste	8.5/10
Pitchfork	4.5/10
The Skinny	4/5 stars
Spectrum Culture	4.5/5 stars
Uncut	8/10

There Existed an Addiction to Blood received mostly positive reviews: aggregating website Metacritic reports a normalized rating of 73, based on 11 critical reviews. Paul Simpson of AllMusic described the album's "most exciting tracks" as "downright hallucinatory" and considered that Diggs' delivery is "precise and unflinching, detailing gruesome scenes with pinpoint accuracy". The Line of Best Fit's Jack Bray hailed as "disheartening and sonically intriguing", adding that it "is yet another successful experiment for the group and one of the eeriest examples of modern hip-hop to date".

== Track listing ==
All tracks are produced by Clipping.

There Existed an Addiction to Blood
No.	Title	Writer(s)	Length
1.	"Intro"	Daveed Diggs; Jonathan Snipes; William Hutson	1:04
2.	"Nothing Is Safe"	Diggs; Snipes; Hutson	4:57
3.	"He Dead" (featuring Ed Balloon)	Diggs; Snipes; Hutson; Edmund Oribhabor	4:22
4.	"Haunting (Interlude)"	Diggs; Snipes; Hutson	0:57
5.	"La Mala Ordina" (with The Rita, featuring Elcamino and Benny the Butcher)	Diggs; Snipes; Hutson; Demetrius Jackson; Jeremie Pennick; John W. Snyder; Sam McKinlay	5:46
6.	"Club Down" (with Sarah Bernat)	Diggs; Snipes; Hutson	4:30
7.	"Prophecy (Interlude)"	Diggs; Snipes; Hutson	1:11
8.	"Run for Your Life" (featuring La Chat)	Diggs; Snipes; Hutson; Chastity Daniels	4:52
9.	"The Show"	Diggs; Snipes; Hutson	3:04
10.	"Possession (Interlude)"	Diggs; Snipes; Hutson	2:10
11.	"All in Your Head" (featuring Counterfeit Madison and Robyn Hood)	Diggs; Snipes; Hutson; Sharon Udoh	4:29
12.	"Blood of the Fang"	Diggs; Snipes; Hutson; Sam Waymon	4:49
13.	"Story 7"	Diggs; Snipes; Hutson	3:40
14.	"Attunement" (with Pedestrian Deposit)	Diggs; Snipes; Hutson; Janine Borges; Shannon Kennedy	4:46
15.	"Piano Burning"	Annea Lockwood	18:00
Total length:			68:37

Track 15 is omitted from cassette copies of Addiction, likely due to its unusually long runtime.

== Charts ==
Chart (2019)	Peak position
US Heatseekers Albums (Billboard)	3
US Independent Albums (Billboard)	8
