= Backxwash =

Zambian-Canadian rapper and producer

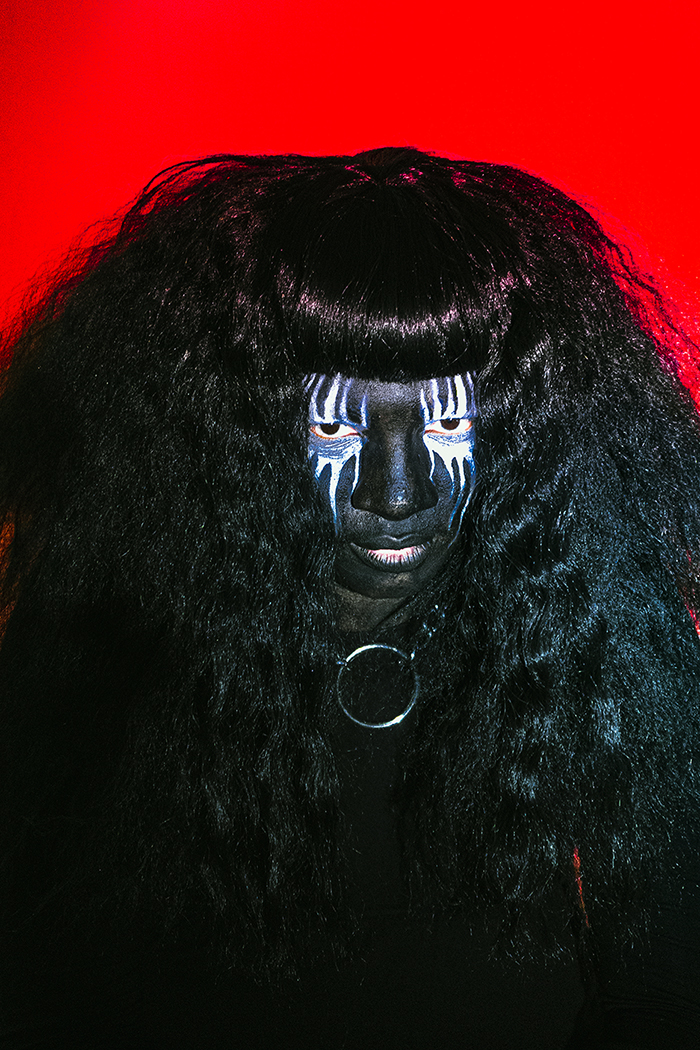
- Backxwash 2021 press photo

Background information
- Born: October 4, 1991 (age 35); Lusaka, Zambia
- Origin: Montreal, Quebec, Canada
- Genres: Horrorcore; trap metal; industrial hip-hop; alternative hip-hop; conscious hip-hop; rap metal
- Occupations: Rapper; songwriter; producer
- Years active: 2018–present
- Labels: Ugly Hag (current); Grimalkin (former)
- Website: www.backxwash.com

Ashanti Mutinta (born October 4, 1991), known professionally as Backxwash, is a Zambian-Canadian rapper and record producer based in Montreal, Quebec. She is most noted for her 2020 album God Has Nothing to Do with This Leave Him Out of It, which won the 2020 Polaris Music Prize.

== Biography ==
Born and raised in Lusaka, Zambia, to a family of Tumbuka and Chewa ancestry, Mutinta began rapping and producing music in FL Studio before moving to British Columbia, Canada at age 17 to attend university for computer science.

After completing her degree she moved to Montreal, where she began performing at jam nights and released her debut extended play (EP) F.R.E.A.K.S. in 2018. She followed up later the same year with the EP Black Sailor Moon. Around the same time, she came out as transgender.

God Has Nothing to Do with This Leave Him Out of It, her second album, was released in May 2020. Her musical style blends hip-hop with heavy metal and post-rock, including Black Sabbath samples and instrumental interludes influenced by Godspeed You! Black Emperor. However, the album featured numerous uncleared samples, which have forced its removal from online music stores and streaming services, meaning that it is now available solely as a free download from Backxwash's Bandcamp page.

She would then release her third album, I Lie Here Buried with My Rings and My Dresses, on June 20, 2021, to generally positive reviews. I Lie Here Buried with My Rings and My Dresses was longlisted for the 2022 Polaris Music Prize.

Backxwash's "Don't Come to the Woods" and "Devil in a Moshpit" appeared in Season 1, Episode 2 of the Showtime series, Work in Progress.

Her fifth album, Only Dust Remains, launched on March 28, 2025, was also longlisted for the 2025 Polaris Music Prize.

== Artistry ==
Backxwash's primary sonic influences derive from traditional Zambian music, industrial metal, post-rock, and experimental hip-hop. Her music often deals with contrasting themes of queerness and being transgender and religion, inspired by her heavily Christian upbringing, as well as subjects of mental health, existentialism and political themes. She was drawn to horrorcore music as a conduit for "painting her emotions".

During her childhood in Zambia, Mutinta was inspired to become a rapper by musicians such as Big L, Kanye West, J Dilla, Method Man, Mobb Deep, and The Notorious B.I.G., saying that Mo Money Mo Problems was her first exposure to hip-hop as a child. She has cited rappers Danny Brown and JPEGMafia, frequent collaborators Black Dresses, musician Lingua Ignota, and metal and rock artists Liturgy, Nine Inch Nails, and Godspeed You! Black Emperor as inspirations on her style and artistry; in particular, she called Brown's Atrocity Exhibition a "perfect record" that greatly influenced her outlook while creating music.

== Personal life ==
Raised in a heavily Christian household, Mutinta is a practitioner of indigenous Tumbuka and Chewa religion, with a major theme of her 2020–22 album trilogy being her experience moving away from Christianity and towards her indigenous practices. She described her family life in Zambia as one where Christianity and fear of God were imposed upon her, her family switching Christian denominations regularly, and she felt outcast as a child because of her feminine expression; practicing her traditional religion as an adult allowed her greater self-expression and reclamation of her culture.

== Discography ==
Studio albums

- Deviancy (2019)
- God Has Nothing to Do with This Leave Him Out of It (2020)
- I Lie Here Buried with My Rings and My Dresses (2021)
- His Happiness Shall Come First Even Though We Are Suffering (2022)
- Only Dust Remains (2025)

Extended plays

- F.R.E.A.K.S (2018)
- Black Sailor Moon (2018)
- Stigmata (2020)
