= Black Dresses =

Canadian noise pop duo

- Origin: Toronto, Ontario, Canada
- Genres: Noise pop; electro-industrial; glitch pop
- Years active: 2017–2024
- Past members: Devi McCallion; Ada Rook

Black Dresses was a Canadian noise pop duo consisting of Ada Rook and Devi McCallion, formed in 2017. Their debut album, Wasteisolation, was released independently in 2018. The duo released three additional albums, Thank You (2019), Love and Affection for Stupid Little Bitches (2019), and Peaceful as Hell (2020), before breaking up in 2020 in response to harassment from fans towards McCallion. Despite maintaining their declaration of disbandment, Black Dresses released three additional albums over the following four years, Forever in Your Heart (2021), Forget Your Own Face (2022), and Laughingfish (2024). Upon releasing Laughingfish, the band announced that it would be their final album.

== History ==
=== 2018–2019: Wasteisolation, Thank You, and Love and Affection for Stupid Little Bitches ===
Black Dresses was formed in 2017 by self-taught musicians Ada Rook and Devi McCallion after Rook sent McCallion a beat on Twitter. They released their first single, a cover of M.I.A.'s "Paper Planes", in December 2017.

The duo released their debut album, Wasteisolation, in April 2018. The album was created entirely through online collaboration, with McCallion based in Toronto and Rook in Vancouver. Wasteisolation received positive coverage by Noisey, Stereogum and The Fader who called it "a raw, abrasive, and deliriously catchy album about surviving as trans women in an antagonistic world." This was followed shortly by the EP HELL IS REAL, released in October of the same year. The EP featured in Stereogum's Best EPs of 2018 list, with the duo also featuring in the publication's list of best new artists.

In February 2019, Black Dresses released their second studio album, Thank You. In May, they released Dreams Come True 2019, a remix EP consisting of new versions of several Wasteisolation tracks. The band released their third studio album, Love and Affection for Stupid Little Bitches in August 2019. The album was reviewed positively, with Pitchfork's Colin Joyce awarding an album a rating of 7.7, and Noisey including the record on its "22 Best Albums You May Have Missed in 2019" list.

=== 2020: Peaceful as Hell and initial disbandment ===
In March 2020, a full-length animated video for the Wasteisolation track "Nausea" was released. On 13 April 2020, the second anniversary of Wasteisolation's release, Black Dresses released their fourth LP, Peaceful as Hell. The album received a rating of 7.6 from Pitchfork, with Leah Mandel stating, "Especially with the world's hellishness currently blaring at us, every social disparity spotlighted and exacerbated, loneliness and doubt deepened to an extreme degree, Peaceful as Hell is perfect medicine".

The duo announced via Twitter on 26 May 2020, that Black Dresses would be disbanding, citing the harassment received by McCallion as the reason. The band's music was also temporarily taken off streaming services. In July 2020, their remix of 100 gecs' "745 Sticky" was released on the remix album 1000 Gecs and the Tree of Clues. On 20 December 2020, a new single titled "World Peace" featuring ESPer99 was announced on Twitter, which was recorded in 2019. The single was released the next day on 21 December 2020. McCallion and Rook also continued to release solo music under their real names and, for McCallion, Girls Rituals.

=== 2021–2022: Forever in Your Heart and Forget Your Own Face ===
On 14 February 2021, the duo released their fifth studio album, Forever in Your Heart, announcing it 30 minutes prior to its release. Despite the release, the group stated, "We're no longer a band unfortunately. Regardless, we've decided to keep putting out music." Ten days later, Backxwash announced the tracklist for her album I Lie Here Buried with My Rings and My Dresses, which was to feature Rook and McCallion on separate tracks, although after tracklist changes McCallion did not appear on the album.

In August 2021, Black Dresses' music returned to streaming services. In December 2021, Black Dresses appeared on the holiday compilation album Christmasasaurus X2 with their version of the song "We Are Children of the Light" by Eugene O'Reilley.

On 14 February 2022, the duo released their sixth studio album, Forget Your Own Face, exactly one year after their previous album released, to overall positive reception. Hannah Jocelyn on Pitchfork stated: "For a band that often writes about internalized shame and self-loathing, the resentment at the heart of this record feels more outwardly pointed." On 30 September 2022, the duo released a cover of the Scene Queen track "Pink Panther". An announcement was posted on their Twitter for their cover of "Kill All Your Friends", which was released the same day on 17 October 2022.

=== 2023–2024: Laughingfish and final disbandment ===
On 3 May 2023, Black Dresses posted an announcement for a new single titled "Gutz" featuring Rirugiliyangugili. The music video for the song was released the next day on 4 May 2023. That August, they collaborated with Canadian Electro-pop band Purity Ring for their single "Shines". They released a remix of "Got Damn Star" by So Drove on 29 September 2023, which features Kevin Jz Prodigy, Kornbread Jeté, and Yung Onyx.

The duo released their seventh studio album, Laughingfish, on 20 May 2024. Upon release, they announced that it would be their final album.

== Band members and solo work ==
=== Ada Rook ===
Ada Rook, who previously went by rooksfeather on SoundCloud and Bandcamp, currently releases music under her own name. She has made 13 solo albums to date. She mainly released ambient albums until her 2018 album shed blood, where she shifted into her present industrial sound. In 2022, she released Ugly Death No Redemption Angel Curse I Love You, featuring ESPer99. The album includes samples of the 2007 anime Ice. In 2025, she released the solo albums Unkillable Angel and 59 Nights On June 1st 2026, she released the album c𝖀m songs.

Rook is a member of various other music projects. For example, she has an alternate solo project called Crisis Sigil. Rook also is one half of a duo with Ash Nerve named Angel Electronics, created in 2022. The duo released the nine-song EP Ultra Paradise in 2023. She is also a member of the pop duo Rook & Nomie.

In 2025, Rook announced the noise pop duo DOOR EATER with Lauren Bousfield. Their debut album try was released in June 2025. Rook and Bousfield had previously collaborated on the song Hazer from Bousfield's 2023 album Salesforce.

Rook also creates video games, most notably Fallow in 2021, and worked on Sticky Zeitgeist with Porpentine Charity Heartscape, Devi McCallion, and others. Rook acted in two upcoming installments of Castration Movie by Louise Weard: Castration Movie ⅗ Year of the Hyaena and Castration Movie Part 4: Endless September. Her music is featured in the 2022 horror film Red Rooms.

=== Devi McCallion ===
McCallion has released music online since at least 2006, under her own name and several aliases. She released her first album 1998 under the alias Eat Babies in 2006, and released Meow in 2011.

As Mom, she has released five studio albums, four of which are numbered self-titled releases.

As Girls Rituals, she has released six projects: Reddishness (2015), New Nowhere (2016), Emergency! (2017), I'm Desperate (2018), Crap Shit (2020), Cow (2021), and I’m It! (2025). Under Girls Rituals, she also released a single entitled "Black Cloud" in 2017, for which she later released a compilation project featuring seven remixes of the song by various other artists titled Black Cloud 2021 (2021).

As Cats Millionaire, she has released Fun Fun Fun (2013) and I'm So Sorry (2012).

She also created two collaboration albums with Katie Dey: Some New Form of Life (2018), and Magic Fire Brain (2020).

She has been a member of several side projects over the years, including the Various Endeavors?, where she co-produced most of the band's music from 2007 to 2010. She is also a member of Anarchy 99 with So Drove. Anarchy 99 has released one studio album, Rockstar Super Heat (2021).

== Discography ==
=== Albums ===
- Wasteisolation (2018)
- Thank You (2019)
- Love and Affection for Stupid Little Bitches (2019)
- Peaceful as Hell (2020)
- Forever in Your Heart (2021)
- Forget Your Own Face (2022)
- Laughingfish (2024)

=== EPs ===
- Lethal Poison for the System (2017) (with 99jakes and Laura Les, remixes of Paper Planes by M.I.A.)
- Hell Is Real (2018)
- Dreams Come True 2019 (2019)

=== Singles ===
==== As lead artist ====
- "Crush" (Tessa Violet cover)
- "World Peace" (featuring ESPer99)
- "We Are Children of the Light"
- "Pink Panther" (Scene Queen cover)
- "Kill All Your Friends" (My Chemical Romance cover)
- "Gutz" (featuring Rirugiliyangugili)
- "Bad Veggies"

==== As featured artist ====
- "Shines" (Purity Ring featuring Black Dresses)
