= Deathbomb Arc =

American independent record label

- Founded: 1998
- Founder: Brian Miller; Leroy Brown
- Genre: Experimental; Various
- Country of origin: U.S.
- Location: Philadelphia, PA
- Official website: www.deathbombarc.com

Deathbomb Arc is an independent record label based in Philadelphia, Pennsylvania, US. It was started in 1998 by Brian Miller in Los Angeles, California, originally to release music by the band Turbine. Miller's cat Leroy Brown was the label's acting CEO until his death in 2014.

Miller has described the label's ethos as a "'fuck you' attitude towards a music industry that is afraid of new ideas" and as "a window into another universe... for those of us with an ear to new sounds, we're already in that other universe, but I want to reach people who normally have to wait years before an 'experimental' act is deemed normal enough for them." He characterises Deathbomb Arc as an "artist label" as well as a record label, treating record releases as just one part of an artistic spectrum. As an example, he cites Clipping as a Deathbomb Arc act, despite the group self-releasing their first album. According to Clipping's William Hutson, "The modus operandi of Deathbomb is punk as a way of being in the world, and not a type of music."

Their website explains that "our criteria for putting out bands is inexplicable" and not constrained by genres. The label has released a wide range of styles including breakcore, noise rock, witch house, new age, hip hop, ambient, punk and techno. Notable releases include the first material from Clipping, JPEGMafia, Death Grips and Julia Holter.

Deathbomb Arc ran a digital singles club in 2011 and 2012, releasing a single each week by a wide variety of artists.

== Artists released ==
- Abe Vigoda
- AIDS Wolf
- Alphabets
- Angry Blackmen
- Back to the Future the Ride
- Black Pus
- Books on Tape
- Captain Ahab
- Child Pornography
- Clipping
- The Dead Science
- Death Grips
- Debby Friday
- Dos Monos
- Divorce
- Drug the Corpse
- Ed Balloon
- Fairhorns
- Foot Village
- Gang Wizard
- Girl Pusher
- Grypt
- I.E.
- J. Fisher
- JPEGMafia
- Julia Holter
- Kevin Blechdom
- Lana Del Rabies
- Mad Murderz
- No Restraint
- Obsidian Pond
- Pariah Qarey
- Patrick Wensink
- P.E.E.
- Puppy Dog
- R. Stevie Moore
- Ratsmagick
- Rose for Bohdan
- rRope
- Sarn
- Shadi
- Signor Benedick the Moor
- They Hate Change
- Thurston Moore
- tik///tik
- Trash Dog
- True Neutral Crew
- Turbine
- Viper Venom
- Yellow Swans
- Yola Fatoush
- Yuma Nora
- Xiu Xiu
