= Clipping (band) =

American hip-hop trio

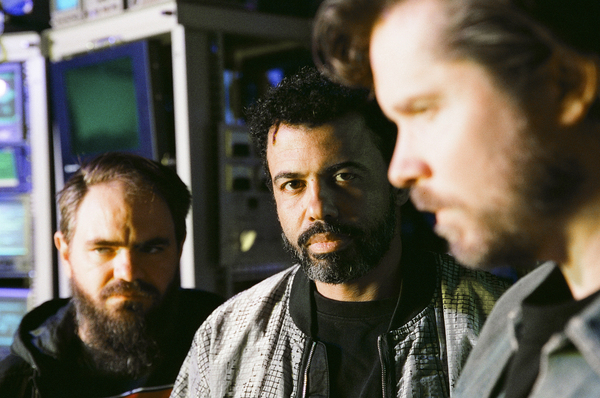
- Clipping in 2025. From left: Snipes, Diggs and Hutson

Background information
- Origin: Los Angeles, California, U.S.
- Genres: Experimental hip-hop; industrial hip-hop; noise rap; horrorcore
- Years active: 2009–present
- Labels: Deathbomb Arc; Sub Pop
- Members: Daveed Diggs; William Hutson; Jonathan Snipes
- Website: www.clppng.com

Clipping (stylized as clipping.) is an American experimental hip-hop group from Los Angeles, California. The group consists of rapper Daveed Diggs and producers William Hutson and Jonathan Snipes.

== History ==
Daveed Diggs and William Hutson met in elementary school, and Hutson and Jonathan Snipes were college roommates. The group began in 2009 as a remix project, with Hutson and Snipes taking a cappellas of mainstream rap artists and making power electronics and noise remixes of them to amuse themselves. Diggs joined in 2010 and began to write his own raps over their compositions. They self-released their debut mixtape, midcity, on their website on February 5, 2013. Though their expectations were low, and despite minimal promotion, the mixtape was well-received, and five months later, they signed to Sub Pop. Their debut studio album, CLPPNG, was released on June 10, 2014.

The group does not see their abrasive sound as a rejection of mainstream hip-hop or reaction against it, but as part of a hip-hop tradition, including the likes of Dr. Dre and Public Enemy producers the Bomb Squad, who experimented with production and also used harsh, musique concrète-esque techniques in their music. Similarly, they think of themselves as a rap group rather than industrial hip-hop, noise rap, or other mashup genres.

On June 14, 2016, they released an EP, Wriggle. They then released their second studio album, Splendor & Misery, later on September 9. A science fiction concept album, Splendor & Misery was nominated for the 2017 Hugo Awards in the category of "Best Dramatic Presentation (Short Form)" on April 4, 2017.

In 2017, the group released a single, "The Deep". The song was nominated for a Hugo Award in 2018, their second consecutive nomination in the "Best Dramatic Presentation (Short Form)" category.

On September 28, 2018, the group's song "Stab Him in the Throat" was released as part of The Rick and Morty Soundtrack. This album was released by Sub Pop and Adult Swim and featured songs from episodes of Rick and Morty.

On August 14, 2019, the group released a lyric video to YouTube for a new song titled "Nothing Is Safe", which borrowed heavily from the aesthetics of 1970s and '80s horror films like Halloween and the soundtrack works of John Carpenter. This was coupled with the announcement that their third full-length record, There Existed an Addiction to Blood, would be released on October 18 of the same year.

On September 12, 2019, a second lyric video was released to YouTube to promote There Existed an Addiction to Blood. The track, titled "La Mala Ordina", featured guest appearances from rappers Elcamino and Benny the Butcher, with additional production from noise artist The Rita.

On October 3, 2019, a music video for the track "Blood of the Fang" was released to YouTube to promote There Existed an Addiction to Blood.

On November 29, 2019, the band released a three-song EP further exploring the world of "The Deep". The EP was also further developed into a novel of the same name by writer Rivers Solomon; the members of Clipping are listed as co-authors. The Deep won the Lambda Literary Award for science fiction, and was nominated for Hugo, Nebula, and Locus awards.

On June 19, 2020, they released the track "Chapter 319" on Bandcamp, along with a previously SoundCloud-only track, "Knees on the Ground", with all proceeds from the sales donated to organizations dedicated to racial justice. "Chapter 319" was recorded during the protests after the murder of George Floyd, while "Knees on the Ground" was originally recorded after the shooting of Michael Brown in 2014.

On August 26, 2020, they announced the album Visions of Bodies Being Burned, a companion piece to There Existed an Addiction to Blood; they also released the single "Say the Name" on the same day. The album was released on October 23 through Sub Pop.

On November 1, 2020, on their YouTube channel, they livestreamed a performance of the first variation of the socialist anthem The People United Will Never Be Defeated! – playing on a tape recorder, under a small flame, on loop, with the picture slowly distorting – until the 2020 United States presidential election was called. The performance was for a movement called "#BeginWithTheBallot" by Alarm Will Sound.

On December 4, 2020, Daveed Diggs released a video in partnership with the Disney Channel entitled "Puppy for Hanukkah". The track was produced by Clipping bandmates Hutson and Snipes. On December 25, 2020, a music video for the track "Piano Burning" was released to YouTube to promote There Existed an Addiction to Blood.

On September 21, 2022, the band announced and released the first of a series of four remix EPs to be released every Wednesday through October 12 via Sub Pop. The first, Remxng 2.1, features remixing artists including Loraine James, Bogdan Raczynski, and Lauren Bousfield.

On September 12, 2024, the group released the new single "Run It", with their Bandcamp page announcing it would be the first single from their new album that looks to combine hip-hop with cyberpunk elements. The album, titled Dead Channel Sky, released on March 14, 2025. Along with "Run It", three other singles were released to promote the LP: "Keep Pushing", "Change the Channel" and "Welcome Home Warrior", which features New York–based rapper Aesop Rock.

== Style and influences ==
The group has drawn comparisons to the likes of the Geto Boys, Gravediggaz, Three 6 Mafia, Kool Keith, Eminem, Dälek, Death Grips, My Bloody Valentine, Tim Hecker and Shabazz Palaces. The Guardian described their sound as "the sort of shrill thrills you imagine could function as incidental soundtrack music for a documentary about abattoirs or might conceivably be the work of a young band intent on twisting industrial metal into brutal new shapes. With rapping on top." Rolling Stone called them "[n]imble-tongued, beat-fractured L.A. hip-hop spilled over the abrasive crunches, squeals, clangs, slurps, and static of experimental musique concrète."

As part of their experimental style, the band adhere to certain stylistic limitations. Their instrumentation is often derived from real-world samples (e.g. using recordings of bottles being hit or bricks breaking) instead of traditional instruments. Additionally, they frequently incorporate field recordings into their work. Similarly, Diggs writes his rap in second or third person – all 'I, me' language is off limits. This restriction is not extended to guests and collaborators.

== Discography ==
=== Albums ===
- CLPPNG (Sub Pop, 2014)
- Splendor & Misery (Sub Pop & Deathbomb Arc, 2016)
- There Existed an Addiction to Blood (Sub Pop, 2019)
- Visions of Bodies Being Burned (Sub Pop, 2020)
- Dead Channel Sky (Sub Pop, 2025)

=== EPs ===
- Wriggle (Sub Pop, 2016)
- Face (Deathbomb Arc, 2018)

=== Mixtapes ===
- Midcity (Self-released, 2013)

=== Remix albums ===
- REMXNG (Self-released, 2016)
- CLBBNG Vol. 1 (Sub Pop, 2022)
- REMXNG 2 (Sub Pop, 2022)
  - REMXNG 2.1
  - REMXNG 2.2
  - REMXNG 2.3
  - REMXNG 2.4

=== Live albums ===
- Double Live (with Christopher Fleeger) (Sub Pop, 2020)

=== Singles ===
Title	Year	Album
"Baby Don't Sleep"	2016	Splendor & Misery
"Air 'Em Out"	2016	Splendor & Misery
"True Believer"	2017	Splendor & Misery
"The Deep"	2017	Non-album single
"Nothing Is Safe"	2019	There Existed an Addiction to Blood
"La Mala Ordina"	2019	There Existed an Addiction to Blood
"Blood of the Fang"	2019	There Existed an Addiction to Blood
"Chapter 319"	2020	Non-album single
"Say the Name"	2020	Visions of Bodies Being Burned
"'96 Neve Campbell"	2020	Visions of Bodies Being Burned
"Pain Everyday"	2020	Visions of Bodies Being Burned
"Tipsy"	2024	Non-album single
"Run It"	2024	Dead Channel Sky
"Keep Pushing"	2024	Dead Channel Sky
"Change the Channel"	2025	Dead Channel Sky
"Welcome Home Warrior" (featuring Aesop Rock)	2025	Dead Channel Sky
"—" denotes a single that did not chart or was not released.

== Awards and nominations ==
=== Berlin Music Video Awards ===
The Berlin Music Video Awards is an international festival that promotes the art of music videos.

Year	Nominated Work	Award	Result	Ref.
2025	Run It	Best Experimental	Nominated	
