= Sankofa (album) =

2026 studio album by Redveil

Studio album by Redveil
- Released: December 4, 2025
- Recorded: November 2023–2025
- Genres: Neo soul; jazz rap
- Length: 41:04
- Label: Fashionably Early
- Producers: Redveil; Mikey Freedom Hart

Redveil chronology
Playing w/ Fire (2023)	Sankofa (2025)

Singles from Sankofa
- 1. "Brown Sugar" Released: September 25, 2025; 2. "Mini Me" Released: October 16, 2025; 3. "Lone Star" Released: November 6, 2025

Sankofa (stylized in lowercase) is the fourth studio album by the American musician Redveil. It was released on December 4, 2025, through Fashionably Early Records. It marks a drastic departure from his previous work with its neo soul influence, live instrumentation, and Redveil's singing. Sankofa is based on the Ghanaian symbol of the same name, and features personal themes based on Redveil's Caribbean diaspora, family history, imposter syndrome, and relationship with his schizophrenic brother. Guest vocals include Smino and Carolyn Malachi.

Following the release of his previous album Learn 2 Swim (2022) and the EP Playing w/ Fire (2023), he began working on Sankofa through numerous album titles before choosing its respective name. In January 2024, he moved from PG County to Los Angeles to start off fresh. During the project's early stages, Redveil spend time researching articles and videos about songwriting to improve his skill. He later described the album as something he wanted to make since the age of twelve, being based on self-embracement. He ambitiously worked on the album's tracks for months and recorded them with live session musicians.

In promotion of Sankofa, Redveil released three singles—"Brown Sugar", "Mini Me", "Lone Star"—and went on a North American tour from February and March 2026. In July 2026, he performed some of the album's tracks on NPR Tiny Desk Concerts with a live band. Redveil is set to tour as an opening act with Matt Proxy on JPEGMafia's Experimental Rap Tour, taking place from September to October 2026. Upon its release, Sankofa received positive-to-mixed reviews from music critics, who praised Redveil's artistic growth, multi-layered production, and emotional themes, while arguing that his songwriting and production resembles earlier music artists without establishing a distinct identity.

== Background ==
Redveil grew up in Prince George's County, Maryland with a musical family, in which his mother primarily played gospel music while his father played older hip-hop and funk. Redveil made his first song at the age of eight, and began producing beats and rapping by the age of 12. Around this time, he began releasing music frequently on SoundCloud. Following the start of his career, he received attention for his work from fellow hip-hop artists Mike, Zach Fox, and Tyler, the Creator, in which he released his debut studio album Bittersweet Cry (2019) at age 15, before succeeding with Niagara (2020) and Learn 2 Swim (2022).

At the age of 17, Redveil began seeing and taking pictures of the Ghanaian symbol sankofa, which represents a depiction of a "bird with its head curved backwards and its feet facing forward." Taking interest in it, he wanted to make personal connections to the concept through various experiences and emotions he added to the album, understanding it more during its production. Following the release of Learn 2 Swim, In April 2023, Redveil released the EP Playing w/ Fire, which featured frequent collaborator JPEGMafia. He would release a number of singles throughout 2024 and early 2025, including "F2g" (with Mekdelawit), "Whew Land", "What3ver", and "Square One".

== Production ==
Redveil began working on his fourth studio album in November 2023 through numerous album titles before choosing Sankofa, which resonated with him the most. In an interview with Rolling Stone, he described the album as "honoring my inner child as a producer on this album more so than anything else I’ve ever made." While his previous albums use interconnected narratives of his life, Sankofa evolves the connection sonically. Redveil further explained that he was "contextualizing" his feelings that he expressed in his previous albums, such as anxiety and depression, but wanted to express them in another creative direction. Becoming an adult, he began making money from his music, traveling, and seeing different perspective, wanting to "build a better future, bigger than the DMV and more than just hip-hop." While developing the project, Redveil visited Saint Kitts, which took interest in his own lineage and inspired the track "History".

Having "hit a ceiling" in PG County, Redveil moved to Los Angeles, a city that forced him to "execute as a big as possible", in January 2024. Being in more of a solitude state, Redveil spent time reading articles and watching videos about songwriting, wanting his lyricism to give listeners a place to "escape to". Throughout the production of Sankofa, he expressed surprise on his artistic growth, explaining that the original version of "Brown Sugar" felt like "lightning in a bottle" with flirtatious lyrics and a sense of catchiness that made him question if he could emulate the process during the album's development.

"Brown Sugar" was the first track Redveil recorded for Sankofa, right after his move to Los Angeles. A newer version of the track with rapper Smino was recorded months later, eventually appreciating the track not just as the album's thematic anchor, but a relief from significant tension. Redveil later stated that he only wanted Smino on "Brown Sugar" due to his match on the track's tone. Redveil also took interest in having Carolyn Malachi on his album because of his childhood experiences of listening to music, describing her as honoring "jazz in a very intentional way".

During an interview with Hypebeast, Redveil described Sankofa as the album he thought of making since the age of twelve. He explained that the majority of the album was based on embracing himself, reflected on tracks including "Pray 4 Me" and "Or So I". He described the two tracks as having "came out of nowhere when they started", which he considered to "come out in an inspiring way". Redveil also revealed that there were a lot of tracks he began but abandoned, wanting the album to be a cohesive project to convey his emotions and its sonic identity. Out of many tracks that were recorded for the album, he kept "Buzzer Beater / Black Christmas" on all of its drafts, seeing in through a personal and artistic lens.

Throughout the album's production, Redveil brought in live session musicians, giving a lusher and more multi-layered sound than his previous works. In addition to production starting in November 2023, a promotional teaser for Sankofa revealed the dates of five tracks that were recorded, including four—"Buzzerbeater / Black Christmas" (October 7), "History" (October 15), "Stay the Night" (October 16), and "Or So I" (October 17)—recorded in October 2024, and one—"Mini Me" (January 9)—recorded in January 2025. In terms of conceptualizing the tracks, Redveil revealed that some of them took up to eight months to polish lyrically.

== Music and lyrics ==
=== Overview ===
Sankofa is a neo soul and jazz rap album with gospel and psychedelia influences. It contains twelve tracks at a running time of about 41 minutes, and features guest vocals from Carolyn Malachi and Smino. Compared to Redveil's previous works, Sankofa contains much of his singing while maintaining his rapping abilities, and emphasizes composition and live instrumentation over sampling. Thematically, Redveil shows his complex feelings toward his Caribbean diaspora, family history, imposter syndrome, and relationship with his schizophrenic brother, leaning as an "eleven-track attempt at music therapy."

Described by Pitchfork, the album sonically embraces "jazz rhythms, soulful harmonies, and some intentionally blown-out production." Hypebeast writer Elaina Bernstein considered the album to feature "cathartic, stream-of-conscious lyricism that defines the diverse body of work" from Redveil's heritage and history. All tracks were solely produced by Redveil, excluding "Mini Me", which was co-written with Mikey Freedom Hart.

=== Tracks 1–7 ===
Opening the album, "Time (A Dream Deferred)" is based on Redveil's personal anxiety, using the sounds of phone alarms and clocks ticking to reflect paranoid and uncertainty. "Lone Star" leans into a "woozy, tripping-over-itself melody" with vocals from singer Carolyn Malachi, with the lyrics based on Redveil's summers with his grandparents in Texas. "History" shows a reflection of Redveil's family history and Caribbean roots, being inspired from his visit to Saint Kitts and his connection to its heritage and culture. He raps about returning to his childhood home to learn about his family history and contrasts it with an "anecdote where he calls out the privilege of white tourists". A "breezy" love song, "Brown Sugar" features a "singsong chorus" from Smino. Featuring "cheery synths and warm bass", Tom Breihan of Stereogum described the track's sound as similar to Chance the Rapper's style from Coloring Book (2016) and Tyler, the Creator.

"Or So I" is described as similar to the jazz-based nature of To Pimp a Butterfly (2015), where Redveil expresses frustration in traditional ways reinforced by his family. "Pray 4 Me" expresses a dreamy instrumentation reminiscent of a Hollywood Hills sunset, as Redveil lyrically expresses his premature demise while urgently belting "ducking and dodging psychosis got my heartbeat tired". In addition, it reflects on the "violent psychosis" Redveil's brother went through, who suffered from mental illness. "Mini Me" showcases a "more croon-y" approach with a "spaced-out, melodic meditation" akin to psychedelic rock. The track was co-produced by Mikey Freedom Hart.

=== Tracks 8–12 ===
"Save" continues Redveil's introspection, where he emphasizes the imortance of prioritizing his mental health. Following the psychedelic soul-based interlude "Stay the Night", "Buzzerbeater / Black Christmas" structures as a two-part track where Redveil narrates three snapshots of significant life events in three verses. "Buzzerbeater" is a trap-influenced and reflects on Redveil's childhood and career. Starting off as simplistic, its story transitions from "playgrounds and Minecraft lobbies to a sold-out show at the Roxy." After its conclusion with a recording from one of Redveil's performances paired with a heartbeat, "Black Christmas" is rapped with a veritable epilogue as the beat switches. The track is based on Redveil's childhood and his fragmented relationship with his brother.

On the official closer, "Glimpse of You", Redveil experiments with multiple flows and instrumentation, using elements of piano and trumpet throughout the track. Following its optimistic ending, the last minute of the track is a spoken word passage from Redveil's mother, based on the Biblical story of a man with schizophrenia who breaks free from his chains, providing a sense of hope. A bonus track afterward is the original version of "Brown Sugar".

== Promotion and release ==
On September 25, 2025, Redveil released "Brown Sugar", the lead single of Sankofa. The track features fellow rapper Smino and is accompanied with a music video directed by Tyler Shuler. On October 16, the album's second single, "Mini Me", was released with an accompanying music video. On November 6, "Lone Star" was released as the third and final single of Sankofa, also accompanied with a music video. The same day of the single's release, Redveil announced his fourth studio album Sankofa with a release date of December 4. The title is a Ghanaian word that translates as "to go back and get it", reflecting on history and using it to inform the present in preparation of the future, a concept in the Pan-African movement. On November 10, Redveil announced a North American tour, which began on February 11, 2026, in Houston and concluded on March 21, in Phoenix.

On November 26, 2025, Redveil posted a promotional teaser video to Instagram, showcasing footage of five tracks that were recorded in the studio alongside their session dates. On December 4, Sankofa was released to streaming platforms and digital download, through Fashionably Early Records. It was later released on vinyl on June 25, 2026. On July 9, Redveil performed tracks from the album, in addition to "Campbell" (2020), on NPR Tiny Desk Concerts, accompanied by a live band. Following his headlining concert tour, Redveil is set to tour as an opening act with Matt Proxy on JPEGMafia's Experimental Rap Tour, which began on September 22, in Spokane and concluded on October 24, in Atlanta.

== Critical reception ==
Professional ratings
Review scores
Source	Rating
Pitchfork	6.3/10
Spectrum Culture	3/5 stars

The Oberlin Review writer Colin Rivera praised Sankofa for its authenticity and Redveil's artistic merit, considering it to be "one of the finest rap albums of the year." Andrew Sacher of BrooklynVegan complimented the album's composition and emphasize of multi-layered production and considered it to shift from "nasty bars to choral vocal harmonies" and "from lively jazz to noisy glitch hop."

Yousef Srour of Pigeons & Planes characterized Sankofa as a personal attempt at self-examination, describing it as an "overdue uncovering of the self" that showcases self-expression and a sense of hope. Olivier Lafontant of Pitchfork praised Redveil's personal songwriting and artistic versatility, noting references of his family throughout the album. On the other hand, he argued that Redveil's artistic identity encompasses earlier artists and styles, stating that it hasn't been developed yet.

Similarly, Thomas Stremfel of Spectrum Culture noted Redveil's artistry while arguing that the album's songwriting and production recalled earlier music artists and styles without establishing a distinct identity. He characterized it as "alive in a way it never did before", while stating that it had a "feeling that you heard someone else do the same thing years ago".

== Track listing ==
All music is composed by Redveil, excluding "Mini Me", co-written with Mikey Freedom Hart.

No.	Title	Writer(s)	Length
1.	"Time (A Dream Deferred)"	Morton	2:33
2.	"Lone Star" (featuring Carolyn Malachi)	Morton; Carolyn Malachi	2:39
3.	"History"	Morton	2:40
4.	"Brown Sugar" (featuring Smino)	Morton; Christopher Smith Jr.; Emme Kemp; Horace Payne; Lillian Lopez	2:51
5.	"Or So I"	Morton	3:14
6.	"Pray 4 Me"	Morton	3:07
7.	"Mini Me"	Morton; Mikey Freedom Hart	2:33
8.	"Save"	Morton	2:04
9.	"Stay the Night"	Morton	2:09
10.	"Buzzerbeater / Black Christmas"	Morton	3:41
11.	"Glimpse of You"	Morton	2:18
12.	"Brown Sugar (OG Version)" (bonus track)	Morton; Smith Jr.; Kemp; Payne; Lopez	2:56
Total length:			41:04

== Personnel ==
Credits were adapted from Tidal.

- Marcus Morton – vocals, production (all tracks)
- Brian Hargrove – keyboard (1); drums (10)
- Julien Knowles – trumpet (1, 3–4, 7–8, 11)
- Carolyn Malachi – vocals (2)
- Myles Martin – drums (2, 4, 10)
- Keelan Walters – guitar (2–3, 6, 8–11)
- Mikey Freedom Hart – organ (2); production (7)
- Jennifer Rockett – vocals (3)
- Erik Brooks – vocals (3–4; 6, 12); additional vocals (12)
- Jermaine Paul – bass (3–4, 7, 9–10); additional production (4)
- Faith Carey – vocals (3–4; 8, 12); additional vocals (4, 8)
- Amanda Stollings – vocals (3–4, 11–12); additional vocals (11)
- Aaliyah Adams – vocals (3–4, 12)
- Alexandria Arowora – vocals (3–4, 12)
- Cornell Wallace – vocals (3–4, 12)
- Johnny May – keyboard (3, 6); synth lead (4, 12); strings (6, 9–10); piano (10)
- Allayna O'Quinn – additional vocals (4, 12)
- Sara Kawai (6) – harp
- Storm Chapman – background vocals (7)
- Francisco Haye – piano (7)
- Amber Navran – flute (10)
- Luke Titus – drums (11)
