= Trojan Horse (album) =

Studio album by Matt Proxy
- Released: June 19, 2026
- Recorded: 2025–2026
- Genre: Experimental hip-hop
- Length: 33:19 (standard edition); 35:21 (bonus editions)
- Label: Listen to the Kids
- Producers: 44adres; Aidan Farley; Current Joys; Forth Wanderers; Grimes; ILUVKXY; John Nocito; Keytones; Kyan Vanick; Matt Proxy; _MilesNelson; Never Goodbye; Noah Oken; Vadakin

Singles from Trojan Horse
- 1. "Sorry" Released: January 23, 2026; 2. "Love&Addiction" Released: April 10, 2026

Trojan Horse (stylized in lowercase) is the debut album by American rapper Matt Proxy. It was released on June 19, 2026 on Listen to the Kids and features guest appearances from Grimes, Current Joys, Fakemink, Never Goodbye, and Jusq. Trojan Horse continues on his horse-themed series of projects, following the EPs Beating a Dead Horse and Horse Play.

Trojan Horse is an avant garde and experimental hip-hop album which showcases Matt Proxy's individuality and emotional life story across 12 tracks.

== Background ==
Matt Proxy participated in the 2026 Underground Sound cypher, which featured other fellow artists such as Sixbill, RainingLol, and 2Slimey. Following the cypher, Proxy announced via Pidgeons & Planes that Trojan Horse would be on the way. Proxy's father was subsequently deported to Liberia after spending six months in United States Immigration and Customs Enforcement detention. Proxy wanted to make the album personal when he told Pidgeons & Planes that he would put his real life into the project, and that his father the will narrate the record.

In May 2026, Proxy was announced as an opener for rapper JPEGMAFIA's Experimental Rap North American Tour from September to October. Following the announcement, Proxy connected with English rapper Fakemink after he discovered Proxy through his song, "Catfish". Proxy met with Fakemink in person, after he bought him out in Minneapolis for a show, and in London for the release party of his project, Terrified.

On June 11, 2026, Proxy revealed the release date and track list for the album on Instagram, revealing that the project would release on June 19, 2026, and would have 12 tracks. It also revealed the guest appearances for the project: Grimes, Current Joys, Fakemink, Never Goodbye, and Jusq.

== Composition ==
=== Overview ===
Trojan Horse is an avant garde and experimental hip-hop album, which project consists of 12 tracks. The project features Proxy's individualism and focuses on his life story, and focuses on topics such as the cold weather in Minneapolis, his sister's overdose, father's ICE detainment, and deportation. Trojan Horse features constant stylistic shifts and genre-blending production throughout. Olivier Lafontant of Pitchfork described the album as one in which "ear-splitting tonal shifts and distorted transitions" are intertwined with emotions such as "angst, grief, and elation."

=== Songs ===
The album starts with "5", a track featuring Fakemink. The track features "drunken, fuzzy guitar strums and pitch-shifted melodies" and "warped but catchy" vocals by Fakemink, while Proxy raps about love, personal values, and capital punishment. According to Anthony Fantano, the song blends home-spun hip-hop with the modern era internet music paired with the late 2000s indie rock. The second track takes a "hard shift" to "Stars", which kicks off with trap metal, a loud and aggressive production of hip-hop, most of the lyricism can't be comprehended due to its compression, distortion, and over saturation, which ties in hand with the modern era of rage rap, Fantano compared the track to 2Slimey's High Anxiety and OsamaSon's psykotic, the second part of the track is more laid back. It features soul chops, cartoon-gruff raps, and dreamy keys, which are reminiscent of Odd Future and early Tyler The Creator. "Atlanta" is a tribute to his father and delves into racism in the country. The track's flow feels reminiscent of JPEGMafia, Earl Sweatshirt, and Tyler, The Creator, once again. "All You'll Hear Is My Song In Your Head" features dejected delivery against quaint "bittersweet" guitar arpeggios and "sweet, dissonant" vocal leads; "Misery" sees Proxy dive more into individualism, the track features "fist-pumping" drums, and harmoniously beautiful raw AutoTune vocals against blown-out soul chops and guitars; it's also a two-part track, such as "Stars". Lafontant labeled the track as "fuzzy and squeaky", with the lyric and beat compression feeling reminiscent of a "chintzy Limewire bootleg".

"New Solution" features hurried and loose flows over grimy, industrial beats courtesy of Grimes. The beat drop, however, shifts more towards electronic and clanking rhythms. Lafontant wrote how the track is "too dated" and feels like something that has been left off of JPEGMafia's album Veteran. "Blue" features a decent start which devolves into cacophonous guitar leads and stuttering vocal sample drops, which Fantano labeled as premature. "Never Kill Yourself" features Never Goodbye, and is reminiscent of Fishmonger by Underscores. "Meant2B" brings a collage of new ideas and features experimentation, but doesn't follow through with it throughout the track. "Love&Addiction" and "Sorry" feel more or less the same. Lafontant compared "Sorry" to Tyler The Creator's album Igor. On the final track, "God" yet once again sees Proxy dive into individualism, it features uplifting, personal, determined, and self-affirming lyricism which is backed over "pretty guitar plucks" and cherubic backing vocals. Sonically, it features a grandiose, lo-fi, heavy alt rock/guitar rock finale, which is reminiscent of a project by Mount Eerie or Weezer.

== Critical reception ==
Professional ratings
Review scores
Source	Rating
The Needle Drop	6/10 (Note: Specifically, Fantano rated it a light to decent six)
Pitchfork	7.0/10

"Trojan Horse" generated positive reviews from fans and music publications. Anthony Fantano of The Needle Drop rated "Trojan Horse" a six out of ten. Olivier Lafontant of Pitchfork gave the album a seven out of ten, writing how the project showcases Proxy's creativity, and has significant potential and imagination, however, it also lacks focus and sometimes sees Proxy's influence shadow his own musical identity. The final track "God" was featured on The Fader's "Songs You Need In Your Life This Week" playlist.

== Track listing ==
All tracks are written and produced by Matt Proxy. Additional producers listed below.

Trojan Horse track listing
No.	Title	Producer(s)	Length
1.	"5" (with Fakemink)	Never Goodbye; Vadakin	2:15
2.	"Stars"	Never Goodbye	3:46
3.	"Atlanta"		2:26
4.	"All You'll Hear Is My Song In Your Head"	Forth Wanderers	1:15
5.	"Misery"	Noah Oken; Kyan Vanick	4:18
6.	"New Solution"	44Adres; vadakin; Grimes	2:27
7.	"Blue"	Noah Oken; _MilesNelson	3:07
8.	"Never Kill Yourself" (with Never Goodbye)	Never Goodbye; Vadakin	1:54
9.	"Meant2B"	ILUVKXY; Keytones	2:54
10.	"Love&Addiction"	Noah Oken; _MilesNelson	2:36
11.	"Sorry"	44Adres	2:17
12.	"God" (with Current Joys and Never Goodbye)	Current Joys; Never Goodbye	2:22
Total length:			33:19

Bandcamp and YouTube bonus edition
No.	Title	Producer(s)	Length
13.	"iPhone"	Aiden Farley; John Nocito	2:02
Total length:			35:21

=== Notes ===
- All tracks except "God" are stylized in all caps.
- "5" and "Stars" feature uncredited vocals from Never Goodbye.
- "All You'll Hear Is My Song In Your Head" features uncredited vocals from Jusq.
- "New Solution" features uncredited vocals from Grimes.
- "Blue" features uncredited vocals from Alice Jade.
- "Meant2B" features uncredited vocals from ILUVKXY and Cortex.
- "Sorry" features uncredited vocals from ILUVKXY.
- "iPhone" features uncredited vocals from Aiden Farley.

=== Sample credits ===
- "Stars" contains a sample from "Sweet Nothin's" by Brenda Lee.
- "Atlanta" contains a sample from "Father" by The Christians, and a sample from "Answer" by Tyler, The Creator.
- "All You'll Hear Is My Song In Your Head" samples Television by Forth Wanderers.
- "Misery" contains a sample from "Just Too Much To Hope For" by Tammi Terrell, and "Hate Me Now" by Nas.
- "Sorry" contains a sample from "Like That" by Future, and Metro Boomin feat. Kendrick Lamar, and snippet sample, "Tell the World... I'm Sorry!" from the TV show South Park, Season 8, Episode 9.

== Personnel ==
- Noah Oken - acoustic and electric/electric solo guitar
- Aiden Farley - guitar, bass, drums, background vocals
- Matt Proxy - piano
- Miles Nelson - synthesisers
- 44Adres - drums
- ILUVKXY - background vocals
- Cortex - background vocals
- Grimes - background vocals
- Alice Jade - background vocals
- Moustafa Moustafa - mixing, mastering, and recording engineer
- Reenostus - cover art, designs, and styling
