= Edward Skeletrix =

American rapper and producer (born 1998)

- Also known as: Cight, Syckli, ShieldLess, Im A Monster
- Born: July 14, 1998 (age 28); Florida, US
- Origin: Atlanta, Georgia, US
- Genres: Experimental rap; rage; cloud rap; trap
- Occupations: Rapper; producer; clothing designer; graphic artist; conceptual artist; photographer; creative director
- Years active: 2013-present
- Formerly of: 0% Boys, Mizustation
- Website: edwardkingbassiv.com

Edward King Bass IV (born July 14th, 1998), known professionally as Edward Skeletrix, is an American conceptual artist, known for his work in music, photography, clothing, and performance art. He began producing instrumental music in 2013 under the name Cight, and founded the clothing brand Syckli in 2018. He gained wider recognition in 2023 after uploading a series of AI-generated promotional materials to TikTok. That same year, he released his debut project Skeletrix Language. He subsequently released Museum Music in January 2025 and Body of Work in May 2026.

== Personal life ==
Edward King Bass IV was born in 1998 in Florida. He grew up in Albany, Georgia. His father, Edward King Bass III, is a doctor in Albany. Bass attended Georgia State University from 2016 to 2020 and earned a B.A. in Public Health.

During college, Bass worked in a Baltimore-area psychiatric hospital. Bass has stated that his experiences working in psychiatric care influenced his artistic development and interest in consciousness, meditation, and mental health.. In 2026, Bass revealed his history of mental illness, including derealization, and an intense fear of developing schizophrenia that peaked during the COVID-19 pandemic. He has cited Eckhart Tolle and Mooji as major influences on his personal philosophy.

== Career ==
Bass began making music in 2013, producing under the name Cight, collaborating with rappers Night Lovell and XXXTentacion. He released his debut mixtape, titled “A R C H I T E C T U R E” the following year. Bass was also a founding member of underground production groups 0% boys and Mizustation. Bass created the streetwear brand Syckli in late 2018. In mid-2019, Bass adopted the moniker "Edward Skeletrix". In 2023, Bass began uploading AI-generated memes to TikTok, which gained attention for their uncanny and surreal imagery. The videos helped popularize the term "Skeletrix Island", describing a style of intentionally unsettling AI-generated content.

Bass began releasing singles in early 2023, and released his debut project, Skeletrix Language, in December of that year. Ten of the fourteen tracks on Skeletrix Language are titled "Typical Rap Song" followed by a number, and the track "Rappeur FW 24 SS 24" reworks Playboi Carti's "Teen X". Shortly afterward, he teased a project by the name of Skeletrix Islvnd Rvdix 66.7, although it was never released. Following the release of Skeletrix Language, Bass began teasing Museum Music. In the final days of 2024, Edward Skeletrix held a pop-up art gallery in New York City to promote the album, during which he sat inside of a glass box while fans poured water on him, prodded him with provided objects, and attempted to light him on fire. He also threw a $20,000 jacket into the audience, resulting in fights among attendees. Upon its release on January 1, 2025, Museum Music was met with mixed reception from music critics.

Bass announced his third album, Body of Work, on June 23, 2025. Although it was initially scheduled for July 1, 2025, the release was delayed to March 2026 for unknown reasons. On July 14, 2025, in an interview with Our Generation Music, Bass accused longtime collaborator Brennan Jones of mental and physical abuse, stating that Jones threatened to "kill Edward in his sleep" and that he was "not well".

From November 15-18 2025, Bass hosted a series of three exhibits titled Jester's Privilege. The exhibits (War, Perfect Animal, Mother of My Child?) featured art from Bass, as well as performance art. Bass also contributed artwork to a January 2026 exhibit organized by Setareh Gallery in London, Breach.

In early 2026, Bass announced that Body of Work had been further delayed to May 2026. The album's tracklist was revealed via an Instagram post on April 30, 2026, with the album releasing the following day.

The album was accompanied by a broader multimedia campaign. Speaking to 032c, Bass described Body of Work as a "photo album", stating that the project was conceived through images as much as music and that each song was paired with its own artwork rather than a single album cover. The album's visual presentation featured collaborations with fashion designer Mowalola and artist Pol Taburet.

Bass hosted a multi-space installation and performance work in London on May 2, 2026, titled Commerce of Desire, to promote Body of Work.

Bass hosted an exhibition in Los Angeles, California on July 25, 2026, titled Analytica, in collaboration with Illumitati and Weiland. The exhibit was attended by notable figures such as Matt Proxy, North West, Emwell, and Elijah Walker. In 2026, Bass orchestrated his own cancellation by asking various people to publish false, negative statements about him online. He described the project as a way to distance himself from his public image without having to defend his reputation.

== Artistry ==
Bass's work has been associated with surreal and uncanny valley imagery, particularly in his use of AI-generated video and promotional material. 032c described him as a "worldbuilder" whose practice spans music, photography, painting, fashion and performance, with Bass stating that music is "a piece of the world" rather than the sole focus of his work. Bass has said that he is interested in strong audience reactions and in art that appears unsettling while carrying a positive or meditative intention. Writing for Firebird Magazine, Luca Bigler described Skeletrix's music as "piercing, uncomfortable frequencies, distorted pulses, and autotuned grunting."

Bass has cited Triad God, XXXTentacion, Slime Dollaz, Eckhart Tolle, Mooji, deadlydollaz, salon and cough, Arca, and YAYAYI as influences.

Bass's work as Edward Skeletrix has been cited as an influence by musicians such as Matt Proxy.

== Discography ==
=== Albums ===
Title	Album details
Skeletrix Language	Released: December 1, 2023; Label: Self-released; Format: Streaming
Museum Music	Released: January 1, 2025; Label: Range Music; Format: Streaming
Body of Work	Released: May 1, 2026; Label: Self-released; Format: Streaming, LP

== Exhibits ==
Bass has characterized his exhibitions and installations as integral components of his artistic output rather than promotional events for his music releases.

Bass has hosted and contributed to multiple art exhibits:

Date	Exhibit title	Host	Location
29 December 2024	Museum Music	Edward Skeletrix	New York City, New York
15-18 November 2025	Jester's Privilege	Edward Skeletrix	New York City, New York
23 January 2026	Breach	Setareh + Market Gallery	London, United Kingdom
2 May 2026	Commerce of Desire	Edward Skeletrix	London, United Kingdom
25 July 2026	Analytica	Edward Skeletrix	Los Angeles, California
