= Whole Lotta Red (EP) =

EP by Mario Judah
- Released: December 11, 2020
- Recorded: 2020
- Genre: Rage
- Length: 8:25

Mario Judah chronology
Whole Lotta Red (2020)	Endure (2024)

Whole Lotta Red is the debut extended play (EP) by rapper Mario Judah. It was self-released on December 11, 2020, as a response to fellow rapper Playboi Carti’s repeated delays of his long-anticipated album of the same name. Prior to its release, Judah publicly stated that he would issue his own project titled ‘‘Whole Lotta Red’’ if Carti did not meet a self-imposed deadline, framing the announcement as a challenge. The strategy generated significant attention and virality across social media platforms and online music publications.

The EP is a parody of the rage rap style and satirizes the prolonged anticipation surrounding Carti’s Whole Lotta Red, which was ultimately released 2 weeks after Judah’s EP.

== Background and promotion ==
In late 2020, expectations for Playboi Carti’s long‑awaited album Whole Lotta Red had grown rapidly, often hinted at and previewed by Carti, while maintained by his significant fanbase. Many release windows were scheduled and delayed to the dismay of fans. During this period, Mario Judah often criticized the delays and soon announced on social media that he would release his own version of Whole Lotta Red if Carti failed to deliver the album by a deadline Judah set for him. This action was described as 'hijacking' by the publication UPROXX. The announcement quickly spread across the internet, where Judah’s posts, countdowns, and threats to “drop it himself” became a viral talking point within hip‑hop communities.

Judah promoted the project by sharing numerous snippets that imitate Carti’s vocal style, including his iconic high‑pitched delivery and use of ad-libs. He would also post various warnings towards Playboi Carti on the social media platform Twitter. The buildup related to the deadline, combined with Judah’s comedic online persona, created discussion and speculation about whether he would follow through on the stunt. AcrossTheCulture described the EP's creative process as 'exciting' and 'constructive'. On December 6, 2020, Judah would release the lead single for the album "Bih Yah", the music video for which would amass 1.4 million views on the video-sharing platform YouTube within 24 hours of its initial posting and has since accumulated over 13 million views.

=== Release ===
After Carti failed to release his album by Judah’s stated cutoff date, Judah released the EP on December 11, 2020. The unconventional release strategy captured the attention of Carti’s fan base, with Judah himself being a Carti fan and becoming a notable talking point within certain online communities. According to Hip-Hop Vibe, in its first week, the EP received more than 5.8 million combined streams across major platforms.

== Music and lyrics ==
The EP heavily mimics (and satirizes) Carti's vocal style, prominently with Judah's vocal inflections and ad-libs.

== Critical reception ==
Whole Lotta Red received attention from critics for its concept and promotional execution. Britney Young on The Daily Reveille praised the EP and Judah’s imitation of Playboi Carti’s vocal style, also highlighting his emphasis on production, flows, and versatility. Music journalist Quincy Dominic gave the album a negative review on his website RatingsGameMusic, arguing that Judah’s vocals were very difficult to discern but crediting the project’s “very good beats.”

== Track listing ==
1. "Luv My Slatts (Intro)" – 1:10
2. "Figi Freestyle" – 2:41
3. "Bih Yah" – 2:37
4. "Bean & Lean" – 1:56
