= Burning Hammer =

Burning Hammer may refer to:

- Burning Hammer, a type of wrestling move also known as the inverted Death Valley driver
- Burning Hammer, an album by Sex Machineguns in 2001
- "Burning Hammer", a song by JPEGMAFIA on Experimental Rap
