= Body of Work (album) =

- Standard cover art

Studio album by Edward Skeletrix
- Released: May 1, 2026
- Recorded: 2014–2026
- Length: 59:11
- Producers: Edward King Bass IV; o0o; dippr; David Pena; Theta; Fern Shy; Nikita Tokmakov; Silas Roe; Margo Proxy; Alan Mark; Juuni; Kyle Stemberger

Edward Skeletrix chronology
| Museum Music (2025) | Body of Work (2026) |

Alternative cover
- Single covers for 16 of 26 tracks on Spotify.

Singles from Body of Work
- 1. "Guest List" Released: December 5, 2025; 2. "Never Feel Again" Released: March 10, 2026; 3. "Slavery" Released: March 25, 2026

Body of Work is the third studio album by American artist and musician Edward Skeletrix, self-released on May 1, 2026. Marketed as a "photo album", The album features guest appearances from Mowalola, Pol Taburet, North West, Slime Dollaz, and XXXTentacion.

== Background and release ==
Body of Work was announced on Skeletrix's Instagram page on June 23, 2025. Though initially scheduled for a July 1 release, it was later delayed to March 2026 for unknown reasons. In January 2026, Skeletrix announced a further delay to May 1, 2026. From December 2025 to March 2026, three singles were released. The album's tracklist was revealed in an Instagram post on April 30, 2026, with the album releasing the following day. All tracks were additionally released as singles.

An exhibit in London, Commerce of Desire, was hosted on May 2, 2026, as a promotion for the album.

== Composition ==
=== Lyrics and overview ===
Body of Work consists of 26 tracks. Olivier Lafontant of Pitchfork wrote how it's a 26-track sound collage, which was purposefully left messy with ambient breaks, sonic palate cleansers, and emotional checkpoints. According to Lafontant, he feels as if Skeletrix's lyricism feels very masochist and mastubatory"-like. Throughout the project, Skeletrix raps about being "fucked up", going through pain and torture, and telling people to "shut the fuck up". Which goes to highlight there’s almost nothing depicted in his songwriting that his esoteric sampling and production doesn’t communicate better.

=== Songs ===
In a review for HotNewHipHop, Alexander Cole described the production of "Never Feel Again" as "off-the-wall" and Edward's vocals as "whacked-out". Writing for The Fader, Vivian Medithi described the YouTube version of "Let's Have Some Fun" as "ambient gabber". Lafontant wrote how "Art Is Sucking The Life Out Of Me" is a "sludgy" and "fuzzy" song that reminds him of Ricky Eat Acid's Three Love Songs. On "Ariana, Bella Hadid", producer oOo features a "cosmic bounce" paired with "inflected trap beats". "Chaos in the Order" is a fun track according to Lafontant due to the "decent pocket" of instrumentals. "Guest List" features a "sticky" and "debaucherous" flow over "Slinky chimes that float over a baby's crib". "Slavery" features "theatrical pianos" and organ keys that are backed by vocals from a woman, Skeletrix uses clunky AutoTune vocals to highlight his "plight as a tortured artist." "Art Is Sucking the Life Out of Me Fr" features a "thunderous guitar" while "Back Back" features a warm plugg instrumental.

Vivian Medithi of The Fader wrote how Skeletrix's music abnormality paired with North West splits the difference for a happy medium, with Medithi writing how the instrumental is an "ambient gabber", though it could also be accurately labeled “the soundtrack to throwing up in a club bathroom at 3 in the morning” according to Medithi as well.

== Critical reception ==
Professional ratings
Review scores
| Source | Rating |
|---|---|
| Pitchfork | 6.3/10 |

Upon release, the project was rated at 6.3 out of 10 by Olivier Lafontant of Pitchfork. Lafontant wrote that the album is both intriguing and frustrating, highlighting how the project sits awkwardly in the middle between the two. He praises the album's music production, but criticizes Skeletrix's weak rapping and songwriting, writing how it would sound better as an instrumental album instead. All in all, Lafontant ended the review by saying how the project is very fascinating and unique, but lacks thorough songwriting and is somewhat inconsistent in the execution process.

== Track listing ==
All tracks are written by Edward Skeletrix.

Body of Work
| No. | Title | Producer(s) | Length |
|---|---|---|---|
| 1. | "Everyone & Everything" | o0o | 1:22 |
| 2. | "Turn Off the Lights" | 1dippr | 3:04 |
| 3. | "정말많이정들었어요! Im So Attached" | Edward Skeletrix | 2:47 |
| 4. | "Ariana, Bella Hadid" | o0o | 2:08 |
| 5. | "Art Is Sucking the Life Out of Me Ok" (featuring Mowalola) | Edward Skeletrix | 2:03 |
| 6. | "House Party" | o0o | 2:37 |
| 7. | "Slavery" | David Pena | 4:30 |
| 8. | "Art Is Sucking the Life Out of Me 6" (featuring Pol Taburet) | Edward Skeletrix | 1:57 |
| 9. | "Pain & Torture" | Fern Shy; Theta | 2:11 |
| 10. | "Art Is Sucking the Life Out of Me" | Nikita Tokmakov | 2:28 |
| 11. | "Conference" | Silas Roe; Margo Proxy | 2:24 |
| 12. | "Lets Take a Break From the Negativity" | o0o | 1:48 |
| 13. | "So Let's Have Some Fun" (featuring North West) | Edward Skeletrix | 1:47 |
| 14. | "Art Is Sucking the Life Out of Me .." | Edward Skeletrix | 1:50 |
| 15. | "Love Me Not" | Alan Mark | 1:21 |
| 16. | "Art Is Sucking the Life Out of Me!" | Edward Skeletrix | 1:29 |
| 17. | "Guest List" | Silas Roe | 2:15 |
| 18. | "Art Is Sucking the Life Out of Me Wow" | o0o | 3:16 |
| 19. | "Luxury Delusions Aéronef" | Fern Shy | 2:07 |
| 20. | "Art Is Sucking the Life Out of Me Fr" | Alan Mark | 1:16 |
| 21. | "Back Back" (featuring Slime Dollaz) | Juuni | 2:51 |
| 22. | "Art Is Sucking the Life Out of Me Man" (featuring XXXTentacion) | Edward Skeletrix; Kyle Stemberger | 1:57 |
| 23. | "Never Feel Again" | Fern Shy | 2:50 |
| 24. | "Mercay" | o0o | 1:55 |
| 25. | "Chaos in the Order" | o0o | 3:13 |
| 26. | "One More Song Til I'm Famous" | Fern Shy | 1:45 |
| Total length: | | | 59:11 |

=== Notes ===
- Two versions of "So Let's Have Some Fun" exist. The single version is exclusive to Skeletrix's YouTube channel, and features a verse from North West. The album version does not.
- "Art is Sucking the Life Out of Me .." was originally released in 2014 as "Please H e l p!" under the alias Cight.
- "Art Is Sucking the Life Out of Me Man" was originally a 2014 recording of XXXTentacion (Jahseh Onfroy) rapping over one of Skeletrix's beats released under the alias Cight. However, after a request from Onfroy's estate, the vocals were removed.
