= Edward Bass (disambiguation) =

Edward Bass (1726–1803) was an American bishop.

Edward Bass may also refer to:

- Edward P. Bass (born 1945), American environmentalist and financier
- Edward Bass, character in Key Largo (film)
- Edward Bass (producer) of Come Early Morning
- Edward Bass (born 1997 or 1998), known professionally as Edward Skeletrix, American rapper, clothing designer, and visual artist
