= Sky (Playboi Carti song) =

2020 song by Playboi Carti

Song by Playboi Carti

from the album Whole Lotta Red
- Released: December 25, 2020
- Genre: Rage rap
- Length: 3:13
- Label: AWGE; Interscope
- Songwriters: Jordan Carter; Jung Yean Cho
- Producer: Art Dealer

Music video
- "Sky" on YouTube

"Sky" is a song by American rapper Playboi Carti. It was released through AWGE and Interscope Records as the nineteenth track from Carti's second studio album, Whole Lotta Red, on December 25, 2020. The song was written by Playboi Carti, alongside producer Art Dealer. The track peaked at number four on the Bubbling Under Hot 100 chart.

It is well known for its viral “Wake up / It’s the first of the month” line, which is part of a monthly TikTok trend on the first of each month. The line is an homage to Bone Thugs-n-Harmony's song "1st of tha Month".

== Credits and personnel ==
- Jordan Carter – vocals, songwriter
- Jung Yean Cho – producer, songwriter
- Roark Bailey – mixing
- Marcus Fritz – mixing assistance
- Colin Leonard – mastering

== Music video ==
The official music video would release on April 2, 2021, and was directed by Nick Walker. It finds Carti and a whole crew of young punks embracing some senseless mayhem as they ransack a grocery store. As Carti spits the woozy track, he and his cohort empty the shelves and cash registers, knock over displays, and ride carts down the aisles as the camera cuts between footage shaded a bright green and faux-security cam footage. It also features a cameo from Destroy Lonely. As of April 2025, the video has gained over 100 million views.

== Charts ==
Chart (2021)	Peak position
Canada Hot 100 (Billboard)	78
US Bubbling Under Hot 100 (Billboard)	4
US Hot R&B/Hip-Hop Songs (Billboard)	34

== Certifications ==
Region	Certification	Certified units/sales
Brazil (Pro-Música Brasil)	3× Platinum	120,000^{‡}
France (SNEP)	Gold	100,000^{‡}
New Zealand (RMNZ)	Platinum	30,000^{‡}
Poland (ZPAV)	2× Platinum	100,000^{‡}
United Kingdom (BPI)	Gold	400,000^{‡}
^{‡} Sales+streaming figures based on certification alone.
