= Mario Judah =

American musician (born 1999)

- Born: Mario Diamond-Judah Douglas; Before 1997; Flint, Michigan, U.S.
- Origin: Atlanta, Georgia, U.S.
- Genres: Southern hip-hop; horrorcore; trap metal
- Occupations: Rapper; singer-songwriter; record producer
- Years active: 2017–present
- Label: Atlantic

Mario Diamond-Judah Douglas (born before 1997) is an American singer-songwriter, rapper and record producer. He rose to prominence as an internet meme with his 2020 single "Die Very Rough" as well as for his sardonic criticism of fellow Atlanta rapper Playboi Carti regarding the delayed release of his second studio album, Whole Lotta Red (2020), which ultimately led to Judah issuing his own project of the same name two weeks before Carti's album was issued.

== Early life ==
Mario Diamond-Judah Douglas was born on December 6, 1999, in Flint, Michigan, but grew up in Atlanta, Georgia. He is of Ugandan descent.

== Career ==
Judah uploaded his debut single "Crush" to SoundCloud on June 19, 2020. This was followed by the release of "Die Very Rough", which went viral on various social media platforms in September. After the corresponding music video was released, it went viral on Twitter and several memes of the song were created comparing Judah's vocal style and lyrics similar to a Disney villain. In October, Judah performed at Rolling Loud in 2020, which helped increase his audience. That same month, he released a cover of DaBaby's "Rockstar".

On November 30, Judah flippantly announced on Instagram that he would be releasing American rapper Playboi Carti's second studio album Whole Lotta Red "himself" due to frustrations with the rapper not releasing it. He also announced the date of December 6, giving Carti one week to release it himself. On December 6, Judah released "Bih Yah", the lead single from the project, to a positive reception from fans. The first half of Whole Lotta Red would end up releasing as an EP on December 11. Judah also announced that he would be releasing the second half of Whole Lotta Red on December 25 if Carti didn't release his album by then. Judah would end up not releasing the rest of the album after Carti's album released on December 25. Billboard and Google ranked the song "Die Very Rough" at number 75 on their list of the Top 100 Hummed Songs of 2020 in the United States. The song also reached the top of Spotify's Global Viral 50 chart dated October 15, 2020.

His next single in collaboration with the rapper Tes X, called "Its Time To Rock" was released on 28 January 2021. After 6 months of absence, his single "Remember Your Name" was released on 10 September 2021, with the music video on his YouTube channel same day. After that, his only release was few months later, on January 28, 2022, which was a single called "Afraid of Love". All of three singles later became a part of an unknown project. On May 13, 2022, the project's 13-song track list was leaked in its entirety, including the aforementioned singles. As of March 2024, it is still unknown when the album is expected to release

In February 2024, after a series of snippets were posted on his Instagram account through 2023, two years after his previous release, Judah released his second EP called Endure. It was also revealed that Judah signed to Universal Music Group, after a complicated deal with Atlantic Records.

On March 4, 2025, after a year of absence, Judah released a single titled "Love You Anymore" as well as its corresponding music video. The music video gained further attention due to Judah appearing to have gone through weight loss after being overweight for most of his career. On April 14, Judah released another single titled "Never Again" as well as its corresponding music video.

On October 21, 2025, Judah released his third project, an EP titled Sad Metal. The EP marked a shift from his former signature rage and trap metal sound to more emo-infused cloud rap. On February 7, 2026, Mad Metal, a follow-up EP, was released, which returned to his usual sound.

== Artistry ==
Judah's rap style has been described as horrorcore with unique vibrato vocals. According to Judah, he only recently discovered that he can sing, which led him to pursue rap for himself rather than producing for other artists. He has cited rock bands like Breaking Benjamin, Five Finger Death Punch, Pantera, and Wolfgang Amadeus Mozart as his musical influences. Notable fans of Judah are fellow rappers Trippie Redd and Lil Uzi Vert.

== Discography ==
=== Extended plays ===
List of extended plays, with selected details
Title	Details
Whole Lotta Red	Released: December 11, 2020; Label: Mario Judah Entertainment; Format: Digital download, streaming
Endure	Released: February 2, 2024; Label: Mario Judah Entertainment; Format: Digital download, streaming
Sad Metal	Released: October 21, 2025; Label: Mario Judah Entertainment; Format: Digital download, streaming
Mad Metal	Released: February 7, 2026; Label: Mario Judah Entertainment; Format: Digital download, streaming
Maniac of More	Released: April 27, 2026; Label: Mario Judah Entertainment; Format: Digital download, streaming

=== Singles ===
==== As lead artist ====
Title	Year	Album
"Crush"	2020	Non-album singles
"Die Very Rough"	2020	Non-album singles
"Rockstar"	2020	Non-album singles
"The Rockstar"	2020	Non-album singles
"Can't Stop Me"	2020	Non-album singles
"Luv My Slatts – Intro"	2020	Whole Lotta Red
"Figi Freestyle"	2020	Whole Lotta Red
"Bih Yah"	2020	Whole Lotta Red
"Bean & Lean"	2020	Whole Lotta Red
"I Cannot Love You"	2021	Non-album singles
"It's Time to Rock" (with Tes X)	2021	Non-album singles
"Remember Your Name"	2021	Non-album singles
"Afraid of Love"	2022	Non-album singles
"Kill All the Enemies"	2024	Endure
"Kill Dead Man"	2024	Endure
"This Is None of Your Business"	2024	Endure
"I'm Not Human"	2024	Endure
"I Knew So Long"	2024	Endure
"Today It Ends"	2024	Endure
"You Never Cared at All"	2024	Endure
"Love You Anymore"	2025	Non-album singles
"Never Again"	2025	Non-album singles

==== As featured artist ====
Title	Year	Album
"No Exceptions" (Dirrty Phil featuring Mario Judah)	2020	Non-album singles
"U Will Die" (BRUHMANEGOD featuring Mario Judah)	2021	Non-album singles
"You Feel Me!" (MikeNo$leep featuring Tes X & Mario Judah)	2023	Non-album singles
