= Museum Music =

- Edward Skeletrix version cover

Studio album by Edward Skeletrix
- Released: January 1, 2025
- Genres: Hip-hop; rage
- Length: 59:40
- Producers: Witacre; o0o; prblm; Fern Shy; Lush Soma; Ariiicorsss; lilsony; Technocrush

Edward Skeletrix chronology
Skeletrix Language (2023)	Museum Music (2025)	Body of Work (2026)

Singles from Museum Music
- 1. "Skeletrix Island" Released: 27 August 2023; 2. "Yo Bro Will Kill You For A Band" Released: 14 January 2024; 3. "Blurry Picture (Psychosis)" Released: 6 February 2024; 4. "Slave Niggas Still Shop At Neimans" Released: 18 October 2024

Museum Music is the second studio album by American rapper Edward Skeletrix, self-released on January 1, 2025. It was released as a double album, with one half released under the name Edward Skeletrix and the other under the name Im A Monster. Critics categorized the album as rage, a subgenre of hip-hop. It follows Edward's debut studio album Skeletrix Language (2023) and was promoted with an art exhibition in Manhattan. Museum Music received mixed reviews; some critics felt it fit the wave of 2020s underground rap, while others considered its sound unique.

== Background and release ==
Edward Skeletrix started as a visual project in 2019. He began releasing singles in 2023, and released his debut album Skeletrix Language in December of that year. To promote Museum Music, Edward held an exhibition in Manhattan, New York, during which he sat inside a glass box. The album was self-released on January 1, 2025. It is a double album; the first side was released under the artist name "Im A Monster", and the second under "Edward Skeletrix".

== Composition ==
Museum Music is a hip-hop and rage double album. Writing for Complex, Jon Barlas said it was "a call and response; one album doesn't make sense without the other." The Guardian called it "zonked-out electronic rap that feels as if it's on the verge of disintegrating." On its "Im A Monster" half, the lyrics examine mental illness. Museum Music features Auto-Tuned, melodic vocals. The beats on the album incorporate loud, glitchy synths, which Pitchfork's Alphonse Pierre compared to Drain Gang and F1ilthy. Pierre also said that the track "Life's So Funny feat. o0o" sounded like a parody of Travis Scott's "My Eyes" (2023). On the song "Label Meeting", Edward calls out the relationship between the teenage rapper Nettspend and his older mentor DJ Phat.

== Critical reception ==
Professional ratings
Review scores
Source	Rating
Pitchfork	3.7/10

HotNewHipHop's Alexander Cole wrote that "if this is the direction that music is heading, then perhaps Skeletrix is the Underground's Kanye West." Cole also felt the album "very much fit[s] the current wave of underground rap." Conversely, Barlas, writing for Complex, felt Edward "does something different" with the "vast compositions and ghostly dark-trap" of Museum Music. He highlighted the tracks "Plastic Body" and "Blurry Picture (Psychosis)". In a negative Pitchfork review, Alphonse Pierre described Museum Music as a "big, cryptic troll job." He said that the album had "no vision of an alternative sound or perspective" and called it "just the same kind of ultra-polished, opaque, creative-director rap that anyone could make with a few fashion world co-signs".

Museum Music came in 44th place in The Fader's Best Albums of 2025.

== Track listing ==
All tracks are written by Edward Skeletrix.

Museum Music – Edward Skeletrix edition
No.	Title	Producer(s)	Length
1.	"Congratulations"	Witacre	1:25
2.	"Typical Rap Song 11"	o0o	2:03
3.	"Life's So Funny" (featuring o0o)	o0o	2:06
4.	"Blurry Picture (Psychosis)"	prblm	1:43
5.	"Plastic Body"	o0o	4:21
6.	"Slave Niggas Still Shop at Neimans"	o0o	1:39
7.	"Typical Rap Song 12"	prblm	2:12
8.	"God Made You a Monster"	Fern Shy; o0o; Cavitnak; Lush Soma	4:43
9.	"Drug Dealer Injects His Fentanyl (Psychosis)"	Fern Shy; Ariiicorsss	1:52
10.	"Skeletrix Island"	o0o	2:18
11.	"Drug Story"	lilsony	1:54
12.	"Killing Over Likes"	Cavitnak	1:51
13.	"Making Art for Money"	o0o	2:27
14.	"OnlyFan"	o0o	1:31
15.	"Yo Bro Will Kill You for a Band"	Fern Shy	0:59
Total length:			33:13

All tracks are written by Edward Skeletrix.

Museum Music – Im a Monster edition
No.	Title	Producer(s)	Length
1.	"God"	Lush Soma	2:11
2.	"Smoke"	Cavitnak	1:42
3.	"Real Business"	Cavitnak	2:24
4.	"IDGAF"	Fern Shy	1:42
5.	"Real One"	Fern Shy	1:53
6.	"Sunny Days in the A'"	Fern Shy	2:11
7.	"Blue"	Cavitnak	1:58
8.	"`confeti"	Cavitnak	1:38
9.	"Demons on Twitter Wont Follow Me Back"	Cavitnak	1:54
10.	"Pain Pain Pain"	Cavitnak	2:09
11.	"667 Know Im Going to Heaven"	Lush Soma	2:11
12.	"Garçon"	o0o; Technocrush	1:34
13.	"Life Could Go By Quick"	Fern Shy	1:45
14.	"Congratulations (Complete) Only Available on YouTube"		1:08
Total length:			26:27
