= We Live in a Society (EP) =

2025 EP by Flume and JPEGMafia

EP by Flume and JPEGMafia
- Released: 2 May 2025
- Recorded: January 2023
- Genres: Electronic; hip-hop
- Length: 16:26
- Label: Self-released
- Producers: Flume; JPEGMafia

Flume chronology
Arrived Anxious, Left Bored (2023)	We Live in a Society (2025)	Dumb (2025)

JPEGMafia chronology
I Lay Down My Life for You (2024)	We Live in a Society (2025)	Experimental Rap (2026)

Singles from We Live in a Society
- 1. "Is It Real" Released: 2 May 2025

We Live in a Society is a collaborative extended play (EP) by Australian electronic musician Flume and American rapper JPEGMafia. The EP was announced on 29 April 2025 and released digitally on 2 May 2025. It serves as Flume's first project since 2023, as well as his first independent one. Having first collaborated in 2019, he and JPEGMafia worked on the project in January 2023, two months prior to the latter's release of Scaring the Hoes, a collaborative album with Danny Brown.

An electronic and hip-hop EP, JPEGMafia personally considered the production of We Live in a Society to be enjoyable, in which he produced the EP on Ableton Live and also used the Prophet keyboard with Flume. In promotion of the EP, the two released music videos for "Track 1" and "AI Girlfriend" on YouTube, as well as "Is It Real" for radio stations in Australia. We Live in a Society received a mixed reception from music critics, noting that the collaboration was intriguing but felt that their distinctive styles didn't coordinate well.

== Background and production ==
Flume and JPEGMafia have previously collaborated on the track "How to Build a Relationship", included on the former's 2019 mixtape Hi This Is Flume; he later co-produced "New Black History" and "Cult Status", featured on JPEGMafia's 2024 album I Lay Down My Life for You. The sessions for We Live in a Society took place in January 2023, roughly two months before JPEGMafia and Danny Brown's collaborative album, Scaring the Hoes, released. Both music artists produced the project.

According to JPEGMafia's description on the EP's Bandcamp page, he considered the experience of making the project enjoyable and stated that he and Flume had similar experiences in their respective production styles. JPEGMafia produced the EP's instrumentals on Ableton Live and also used the Prophet keyboard with Flume. The album artwork for We Live in a Society depicts a black and white person giving a handshake described to "show each other friendship and respect".

== Music and lyrics ==
We Live in a Society is an electronic and hip-hop EP with glitch and noise influences, which combines Flume's electronic synth-pop style with JPEGMafia's experimental hip-hop production. It consists of four tracks within sixteen minutes. "Track 1" begins the EP with a sketch-style recording session they audibly documented, featuring a wide range of random instrumental snippets. JPEGMafia roasts Flume's production skills, and in one instance, playfully threatens to replace him with Fred Again. The following track, "Is It Real", features stretched and autotuned vocals from JPEGMafia, along with a "clean, graceful" feature from alternative R&B singer Ravyn Lenae. EDM Identity writer Miguel Florencio described Flume's production as putting the song in "overdrive" with "distorted synths" appearing at absurd speeds.

On the slower-tempo emo rap-style track "AI Girlfriend", JPEGMafia compares the usage of AI-generated women for people struggling with dating to his own difficult experience by finding connection with "this person." Usually featuring a simple drum pattern, the track occasionally switches to a "wobbling and aggressive" approach with its synths to match JPEGMafia's discontent with his partner. "The Ocean is Fake", a more instrumental-based track, details JPEGMafia and Flume's settlement following the three tracks described as a "tug of war" between the two. The track relies on harmony and "dreamy soundscapes", where JPEGMafia's "hushed, drifting vocals" outshine its bass and synths. In the middle of the song, he asks Flume, "Did you catch that?", before the latter replies with a "yeah". JPEGMafia raps more on the second half of the track.

== Promotion and release ==
On 24 April 2025, Flume and JPEGMafia released "Track 1" exclusively on YouTube as a seven-minute animated music video created by James Blagden. The music video depicts Flume showing JPEGMafia, both stripped down to their underwear, various instrumental snippets, with each one consequentially effecting the latter. For example, he turns into a fly and an "enormous clown." On the last beat Flume plays, the two venture on a "colorful odyssey through time and space." On 29 April, the two announced the release of We Live in a Society.

Flume and JPEGMafia subsequently released the music video for "AI Girlfriend" on 1 May, co-directed by the latter and Logan Fields. The music video depicts a "futuristic knight in a strip club", which David James Young of Music Feeds compared to the music video for the Prodigy's "Smack My Bitch Up" (1997). On 2 May, the EP was released to digital streaming platforms and digital download. It serves as Flume's first project since 2023, as well as his first independent release. On the same day, "Is It Real" was released to radio stations in Australia.

== Critical reception ==
Professional ratings
Review scores
Source	Rating
The Daily Californian	5/10
The Needle Drop	6/10 (Note: Specifically, Fantano rated the album a "strong 5 to a light 6".)

We Live in a Society received a mixed reception from music critics. Zachary Norvath of HotNewHipHop felt that the EP lacked a clear direction, seeing it as "more of a bridge project for Flume." He concludes that despite this, it does not mean that "there aren't good things to take from it." Similarly, The Daily Californian writer Tallulah Baird stated that Flume and JPEGMafia's balance on We Live in a Society to be interesting but considered it to lack the "spirit that makes both musicians' music work separately."

Anthony Fantano of The Needle Drop considered We Live in a Society to be intriguing but disappointing, arguing that it lacked replay value and creative chemistry in comparison to Flume and JPEGMafia's previous collaborations. Fantano complimented "Is It Real" and "The Ocean is Fake", while he criticized "Track 1" for being a skit-based track and "AI Girlfriend" for being a "novelty cut".

== Track listing ==
No.	Title	Writer(s)	Length
1.	"Track 1"	Barrington Hendricks; Harley Streten	6:36
2.	"Is It Real" (featuring Ravyn Lenae)	Hendricks; Streten; Ravyn Lenae; Tinashe Kachingwe	2:49
3.	"AI Girlfriend"	Hendricks; Streten	3:36
4.	"The Ocean is Fake"	Hendricks; Streten; Francis Clark; Joseph Thornalley	3:24
Total length:			16:26

== Personnel ==
Credits are adapted from Tidal.

- Barrington Hendricks – production
- Harley Streten – production
- Ravyn Lenae – featured artist
