= Matt Proxy =

American rapper and singer

- Also known as: Cloutedmatt; Mwru
- Born: Matthew Murray; 2006 or 2007 (age 19–20); Minneapolis, Minnesota, U.S
- Genre: Experimental hip-hop
- Occupations: Rapper; singer; songwriter; producer
- Years active: 2019–present
- Label: Listen To The Kids
- Member of: Novagang

Matthew Murray, known professionally as Matt Proxy (stylized in all lowercase) and previously known as Cloutedmatt and Mwru, is an American rapper and producer from Minneapolis. He first gained recognition in 2024 following the release of his single "Wtf Do I Gotta Do to Get My Bitch Back", which went viral on Instagram. In 2025, Murray attracted further attention with the release of "Catfish", which garnered support from artists such as Fakemink. His profile rose further in 2026 after appearing on the "2026 Underground Sound Cypher", where his experimental style drew wider notice. Following his growing prominence in the underground rap scene, he released his debut studio album, Trojan Horse on June 19, 2026.

== Early life ==
Matthew Murray was raised in Minneapolis, Minnesota. According to Murray, the city was a perfect spot to develop himself due to the radicalization movements that had occurred throughout the years. Murray figuratively stated how his city "was being burned by fire" with the murder of George Floyd and the killings of Philando Castile and Daunte Wright, among other incidents. As a kid, Murray grew up surrounded by music. According to him, his mother was a big fan of hip-hop and often listened to artists such as ASAP Rocky, Speaker Knockerz, 2Pac, Danny Brown, and Jeezy, among others. His uncle, Jesse, introduced Murray to experimental music when he was younger, showing Murray artists such as Aphex Twin, Neutral Milk Hotel, Death Grips, Panda Bear, JPEGMafia, and Sophie. Murray began making music as early as elementary school, where he had a rap group called C.O.M., and he would beatbox and try to find ways to become a music producer.

== Career ==
Murray began taking music seriously when he was around the age of 12 or 13. At 14, Murray began producing music on FL Studio under a different alias. In 2024, Murray gained attention with the release of his track "Wtf Do I Gotta Do to Get My Bitch Back", which went viral on Instagram. Subsequently, following his rise to fame, Murray changed his alias in 2025. His first release under his current moniker, Matt Proxy, was the extended play (EP) Beating A Dead Horse, in May 2025. According to Murray, his name originated from the VPN he used when he was making music. Murray posted tutorials on FL Studio on his YouTube channel. He released the EP Horse Play in November 2025.

During this time, Murray would continue to release a steady amount of music while continuing to build his name up within the music industry. Following the end of 2025, and entering 2026, Murray began focusing more on his upcoming project, titled Trojan Horse. Then, in February, Murray would make a guest appearance on the "2026 Underground Cypher", with other artists such as RainingLol, Sixbill, and 2Slimey. His part of the cypher immediately went viral online due to his experimental style of music, which resonated with fans of the rage-rap scene. Following his growing prominence in the scene, he gained the attention of American rapper JPEGMafia, who announced that Murray and Redveil would be the openers for his North America tour in support of his album Experimental Rap.

On June 11, 2026, Murray announced the release date for the mixtape Trojan Horse. The mixtape was released on June 19, 2026, containing 12 tracks and guest appearances from Fakemink, Grimes, Current Joys, Jusq, and Never Goodbye. On September 4, 2026, Murray announced the release date for his next album on his Discord server, announcing, "ALBUM IN 12 DAYS." The album was expected to release on September 16, 2026, but didn't do so.

== Musical style and influences ==
Murray's sound is considered a form of experimental hip-hop. Murray's musical style consists of honest lyricism over blaring instrumentals, which showcases his self-destruction throughout his tracks. His inspirations and influences growing up were Kanye West, JPEGMafia, XXXTentacion, and Quinn. He has also cited Edward Skeletrix as an influence and collaborated with him. Outside of artists, Murray has labeled movies as a source of inspiration for him too, with those being Beverly Hills Chihuahua, Mulholland Drive, Yogi Bear, The Princess and the Frog, and Good Will Hunting. Elaina Bernstein of Hypebeast labeled Murray's Trojan Horse as a "genre-blurring" mixtape with a rare combination of features and productions.

== Personal life ==
Murray is a Christian. Murray's father, Mengistu ZarZar, became a professional boxer after leaving jail. In 2025, his father was detained by ICE, later being deported back to Liberia after being in detainment for six months. Murray also had a sister, who died of a drug overdose.

Outside of his family, Murray enjoys researching Neanderthals and early human life. His favorite movie is The Princess and the Frog.

=== Controversies ===
In 2026, artist Martin of the K-pop boy band Cortis praised Murray's track "Knots". Following the co-sign, Murray took to his Instagram story writing "Hit me up", implying he wanted to collaborate with him. However, Murray retracted his statement after listening to the band's music, stating, "Never mind. This is kind of ass. I'm good." Due to this and other comments made by Murray, such as calling Cortis's music artificial and suggesting they appropriated black art, he received major backlash from the band's fanbase.

== Discography ==
=== Studio albums ===
Title	Details
Trojan Horse	Released: June 19, 2026; Label: Listen To The Kids; Formats: Digital download, streaming, CD, vinyl

=== Extended plays ===
Title	Details
Beating a Dead Horse	Released: May 9, 2025; Label: Listen To The Kids; Formats: Digital download, streaming
Horse Play	Released: November 21, 2025; Label: Listen To The Kids; Formats: Digital download, streaming
