= Black Enuff =

2023 single by Redveil and JPEGMafia

Single by Redveil featuring JPEGMafia

from the EP Playing w/ Fire
- Released: April 5, 2023
- Genre: Hip hop
- Length: 2:35
- Songwriters: Marcus Morton; Barrington Hendricks
- Producer: Redveil

Redveil singles chronology
"Giftbag" (2023)	"Black Enuff" (2023)	"Captain" (2023)

JPEGMafia singles chronology
"Scaring the Hoes" (2023)	"Black Enuff" (2023)

"Black Enuff" is a song by American rapper Redveil featuring fellow American rapper JPEGMafia. It was released as a single for Redveil's first extended play Playing w/ Fire on April 5, 2023. The song was solely produced by Redveil. The song received positive reception from critics who praised the duo's chemistry.

== Background ==
JPEGMafia released the collaborative album Scaring the Hoes with American rapper Danny Brown on March 24, 2023. Scaring the Hoes had only one guest feature, Redveil. The Fader called his verse the best on that album. Continuing their collaborative efforts, Redveil announced "Black Enuff" on April 5 alongside Playing w/ Fire, before releasing the song later that day.

== Composition and themes ==
"Black Enuff" has been described as an energetic song. Redveil's production was praised by critics, who commented on his "funky" instrumental and use of 808 drums.

The track features themes of black pride and empowerment. Redveil and JPEGMafia address critics who claim them to not be "black enough" due to their large white fanbases. The song's music video contains visuals of Pan-African flags, furthering this message.
