= Mooji =

Jamaican spiritual teacher

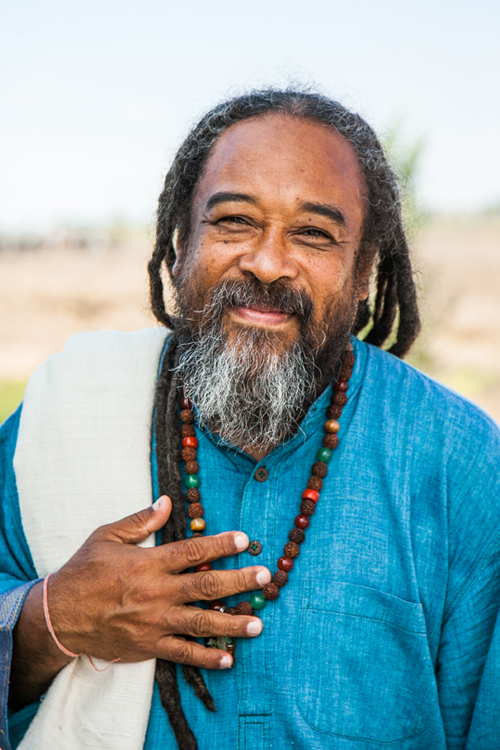
Mooji

Mooji (born Anthony Paul Moo-Young, January 29, 1954) is a Jamaican spiritual teacher of Advaita based in the UK and Portugal. He gives talks (satsang) and conducts retreats. Mooji lives in Portugal, at Monte Sahaja.

== Biography ==
Mooji was born Tony Moo-Young in Port Antonio, Jamaica, in 1954. His mother migrated to the UK as one of the windrush generation when he was one year old. He was raised by his father and his mother's cousin, who later became his father's partner and had additional children with him. Mooji's brother Peter went on to become one of Jamaica's top table tennis players. Mooji's father died when he was eight, and he was raised by a strict uncle until he moved to London to be with his mother as a teenager.

By age 30, Mooji was working as a street artist supporting his wife and child. In 1985, Mooji's sister, Cherry Groce, was shot and paralysed during a police raid on her home, sparking the 1985 Brixton riot. In 1987, Mooji had an encounter with a Christian which began his spiritual quest. Mooji continued to work as an art teacher until 1993, when he quit and went traveling in India, and attended the satsangs of the Indian guru Papaji.

He returned to England in 1994 when his son died of pneumonia. He continued traveling to India, returning each time to Brixton, London, to sell chai and incense, as well as give away "thoughts for the day" rolled up in straws taken from McDonald's. He became a spiritual teacher in 1999 when a group of spiritual seekers became his students, and began to produce books, CDs, and videos of his teachings. On Tony Moo becoming known as Mooji, Mooji said, "What can I say, except that’s life." Mooji's brother Peter said that people had always followed him wherever he went.

Mooji continues to give satsangs at various locations around the world, regularly attracting over a thousand people from fifty nationalities. He also holds meditation retreats, sometimes with up to 850 people, each paying between €600 and €1000 for seven days, including the cost of satsang. He purchased a 30-hectare property in the parish of São Martinho das Amoreiras, in the Alentejo region of Portugal, and created an ashram called Monte Sahaja. According to Shree Montenegro, the General Manager of Mooji Foundation, there are 40 to 60 people living full-time in the ashram. A fire at the ashram in 2017 required the evacuation of close to 150 people. The ashram is funded through the UK-based Mooji Foundation Ltd., which reported £1.5 million in income for 2018 (including nearly £600,000 from donations and legacies), and through trading subsidiaries in the UK (Mooji Media Ltd.) and Portugal (Associação Mooji Sangha and Jai Sahaja).

== Teachings and reception ==
Mooji's followers describe satsang as a “meeting in truth” where people come from all around the world, to ask questions about life, and seek peace and meaning. The BBC described attendees as "mostly well-off whites". One follower describes Mooji's teaching as spiritual food that is neither esoteric nor hard to understand. Attendees come up one by one in front of a large crowd and ask personal questions that Mooji answers or uses for "riffs on faith". The BBC described Mooji's satsang as a "five hour spiritual question and answer session" during which devotees can ask how to find spiritual contentment. Followers are seeking a more meaningful and less troubled life through connecting to their true nature, or "self". Comparing the satsang to a public therapy session, The Guardian describes Mooji as "one of those people who focuses in on you, making you feel like you really matter." According to Outlook, Mooji has one simple philosophy, centred around the search for "I am", not contingent on any religious or political influence. One New York Times journalist who attended a satsang described feeling both moved and confused when a young man approached Mooji onstage and collapsed emotionally into his embrace. Devotees compare Mooji to Jesus, and often line up to receive a hug from him after his talks, and follow him as he leaves. Critics say most people seek out gurus in bad times when they need answers and guidance. Mooji describes his teaching as the easy path to enlightenment.

Rationalist Sanal Edamaruku argues that western gurus like Mooji promote a simple formula that appeals to gullible people seeking an easy awakening. Mooji was called a "Global peddler of metaphysical mumbo-jumbo" in a 22 May 2017 article in Indian publication Outlook.

== Books ==
- Mooji (2010). Breath of the Absolute – Dialogues with Mooji. Yogi Impressions Books. ISBN 978-81-88479-61-0.
- Writing on Water: Spontaneous Utterances Insights and Drawings. Mooji Media. 2011. ISBN 978-1-908408-00-6.
- Before I Am: The Direct Recognition of Truth – Dialogues with Mooji. Mooji Media; 2nd edition. 2012. ISBN 978-1-908408-13-6.
- White Fire: Spiritual insights and teachings of advaita zen master Mooji. Mooji Media Publications. 2014. ISBN 978-1-908408-19-8.
- The Mala of God. Mooji Media Publications. 2014. ISBN 978-1-908408-21-1.
- Vaster Than Sky, Greater Than Space. Sounds True. 2016. ISBN 978-1-908408-23-5.
- Vaster Than Sky, Greater Than Space. Coronet. 2018. ISBN 978-1-473-67466-0.
- An Invitation to Freedom. Mooji Media Publications. 2017. ISBN 978-1-908408-22-8.

== See also ==
- Neo-Advaita
