= Learn 2 Swim =

2022 studio album by Redveil

Studio album by Redveil
- Released: April 20, 2022
- Genre: Hip-hop, Jazz rap
- Length: 35:26
- Producer: redveil

Redveil chronology
Niagara (2020)	Learn 2 Swim (2022)	Playing w/ Fire (2023)

Singles from Learn 2 Swim
- 1. "Diving Board" Released: March 9, 2022; 2. "Better" Released: March 30, 2022

Professional ratings
Review scores
Source	Rating
Pitchfork	8.0/10
HipHopDX	3.9/5

Learn 2 Swim (stylized in lowercase) is the third studio album by American rapper Redveil. It was released independently on April 20, 2022, to coincide with the rapper's birthday. While creating Learn 2 Swim, Redveil took inspiration from drill music and local DMV area rappers.

== Track listing ==
All tracks are written by Marcus Morton; all tracks are produced by Redveil.

No.	Title	Length
1.	"Together"	3:02
2.	"Diving Board"	2:45
3.	"PG Baby"	2:36
4.	"New Info"	2:09
5.	"Shoulder (featuring Mekdelawit & Renaissance Mic)"	4:03
6.	"Better (with Sam Truth)"	3:10
7.	"Sky"	2:48
8.	"Morphine (Da Ways)"	2:57
9.	"Automatic (featuring Fly Anakin & Ovrkast.)"	3:57
10.	"Home"	2:59
11.	"Mars"	3:17
12.	"Working on It"	2:53
Total length:		35:26

Notes

- The titles of all tracks are stylized in lowercase.
