= High Anxiety (2Slimey album) =

2025 album by 2Slimey

Studio album by 2Slimey
- Released: November 14, 2025
- Recorded: 2024–2025
- Genres: Rage; trap
- Length: 23:04
- Labels: Self-released; Listen To The Kids
- Producers: Mental; Thr6x; vlor5k; Juceex; Xkxx; Byt; Kendal94; Xceff; Fl0wzy; Noah Mejia; 333synx; Pouritupsoda; Ok; Malvi

2Slimey chronology
SsoMe (2024)	High Anxiety (2025)	More Anxiety (2026)

Singles from High Anxiety
- 1. "Live In Bass" Released: August 4, 2025; 2. "Meat" Released: August 27, 2025

Deluxe cover
- Deluxe edition cover

Singles from More Anxiety
- 1. "Belly" Released: December 19, 2025

High Anxiety is the debut studio album by Mexican-American rapper 2Slimey. It was released independently on November 14, 2025.

The album features uncredited guest appearances from rappers Izaya Tiji and BabyTron. (Note: On streaming versions, "Race Car", which BabyTron is featured on, is removed from the tracklist, although it remains available as a standalone promotional single.) A deluxe edition known as More Anxiety was later released on February 6, 2026 through the label Listen To The Kids, which is exclusively distributed through Santa Anna Records. Upon release, the album was issued on vinyl and CD.

== Themes ==
"I still deal with anxiety sometimes. Growing up, I had anxiety. Funnily enough, even during school, I never liked presenting to classes, but now I'm out here doing shows in front of thousands of people. But, with High Anxiety, or when you put 2Slimey on, you never know what to expect. It's like you're on the edge, anxiety. That's the concept of the name. But it also ties back to my personal issues. On More Anxiety, it ends with 'Legion', which is like my realisation of the anxiety I've been dealing with, and I'm on the comedown. That's why there's the orchestra at the end, it's a lot more quote, unquote dumbed down, more digestible. If you compare More Anxiety to High Anxiety, it's definitely more digestible than the original project."

— 2Slimey

According to 2Slimey, in his interview with Solomon Pace-McCarrick of Dazed. He stated how the album's theme and name mean a lot to him, because the name was a representation of who 2Slimey was growing up, someone who was constantly on the edge and dealt with anxiety from school to performing at shows. 2Slimey stated how he wants people to expect the unexpected with High Anxiety.

As for the deluxe edition of the album, 2Slimey stated that More Anxiety ties back to personal issues he had growing up. 2Slimey ended it off by saying that "More Anxiety" to "High Anxiety" is more digestible than the original project.

2Slimey also stated how releasing both projects has helped him with his anxiety: "Damn, it's 50-50. I feel like sometimes I'll be catching myself getting anxious, but then I turn it into adrenaline, like at a show. Nowadays, I use my anxiety for positive things." He also stated how listening to the album will allow fans to "release all of their emotions."

== Composition ==
=== Overview ===
High Anxiety is a rage album. Anthony Fantano of The Needle Drop stated how the album sees 2Slimey expand upon the rage sound to an "extreme level." Fantano wrote that the album has vibes that sound much closer to "basement power electronics". Fantano added that 2Slimey tries to find some uniformity with his project, paired with some "tame" and "conventional-sounding" trap cuts throughout. Fantano also states how the album is a form of "auditory abuse" and how 13 tracks and 23 minutes is the perfect amount, because if there were any more, it would ask too much of the listener. Kieran Press-Reynolds of Dazed wrote how the tape is so "serrated it hits like a dagger sawing through your ear canal." Antonio Johri of Complex wrote how the album feels like "stepping into a portal of pure noise". Despite being so loud, he wrote how it sounds more polished compared to his last project.

=== Songs ===
High Anxiety starts with "Bring EmOut". Sonically, Fantano said the track "fires on all cylinders", he described the track as combining a playful, toy-like synth intro with an intentionally distorted, "deep-fried" production style, over which 2Slimey delivers heavily auto-tuned and effects-laden vocals. Despite its abrasive, chaotic sound, he noted a clear structure, including repeated refrains and beat transitions, characterizing the composition as an example of deliberate "controlled chaos" rather than randomness. Kieren Press-Reynolds wrote that the track has addictive patterns, just like the intro track. Fantano claimed that "Shoot atU" and "RedMoon" are fairly unmemorable. Johri compares his sound to that of Merzbow and his project Pulse Demon. In a different article, Johri also praised the track's catchiness, writing: "a hypnotic synth melody and the looping 'shawty in love with the meat' hook have you singing along long after the song ends." Fantano wrote that "In Her Jaw" saw a very weak feature from Izaya Tiji.

== Critical response ==
The album received mixed-to-positive reviews from music journalists and fans. Despite some negative critiques, Fantano enjoyed the album overall, stating he felt a "decent vibe" for this project. In a 2Slimey roundtable, reviewers from Pitchfork described High Anxiety as an extreme version of the "rage rap" style influenced by Playboi Carti's Whole Lotta Red, with very loud, distorted production. They also noted that the music focuses more on sound and energy than clear lyrics. Some praised its chaotic but catchy style, while others found it overly noisy and lacking substance.

== Deluxe edition ==
On February 6, 2026, a deluxe for the album was released. Titled More Anxiety, the deluxe edition featured eight new tracks. Upon release, the deluxe received the same reception as its predecessor, but critics noted how "Legion", the final track on the album, showcased 2Slimey's versatility to produce and work on more melodic tracks, which fans seemed to enjoy. Solomon Pace-McCarrick of Dazed wrote how "Legion" is an "explosively hyperactive" track.

== Track listing ==
All tracks are written by Sergio Garcia.

High Anxiety track listing
No.	Title	Producer(s)	Length
1.	"Bring Em Out"	Mental; Thr6x	2:43
2.	"I Serve Bass"	Vlor5k	1:35
3.	"Roc"	Vlor5k	1:47
4.	"Shoot At U"	Juceex; Xkxx; Byt	1:45
5.	"Rolling Off Molly"	Xkxx; Kendal94	1:27
6.	"Pop A Lot"	Fl0wzy; Xceff	1:57
7.	"Race Car" (featuring BabyTron)	Xkxx; Byt	1:34
8.	"Red Moon"	Noah Mejia; 333synx; Pouritupsoda	2:00
9.	"In Her Jaw" (featuring Izaya Tiji)	Vlor5k	1:34
10.	"Linkup"	Vlor5k	1:35
11.	"OMG"	Xkxx; Byt	1:30
12.	"Let's Go Home"	Ok; Malvi	2:16
13.	"Meat"	Xkxx; Byt	1:35
14.	"Live In Bass"	Vlor5k	1:29
15.	"Kitgo"	Vlor5k	2:51
Total length:			23:04

More Anxiety (deluxe) track listing
No.	Title	Producer(s)	Length
1.	"Throw Up"	15drtt; Mental; Synthetic	2:08
2.	"Dirty Bitch"	333synx; Noah Mejia; Tainiykick; Pouritupsoda	2:11
3.	"Kut Up"	Jetski	1:47
4.	"Power"	Mental	1:51
5.	"Baby Drac"	Vlor5k	1:27
6.	"Belly"	Pwfuu; Synthetic	1:57
7.	"Punk Punk"	Vlor5k; Synthetic; Bass	1:44
8.	"Legion"	15drtt; Mental; Synthetic	1:58
Total length:			23:04

=== Notes ===
- "I Serve Bass", "Pop A Lot", "Race Car", "Let's Go Home", and "Live In Bass" are all stylized in sentence case, as are all songs on More Anxiety except for "Punk Punk".
- "Red Moon" and "Punk Punk" are stylized as "redMoon" and "punkPunk".
- "Bring Em Out", "Shoot At U", and "In Her Jaw" are stylized as "Bring emOut", "Shoot atU", and "In her Jaw".
- On streaming platforms, Izaya Tiji is uncredited for his verse on "In Her Jaw", while "Race Car" and "Kitgo" are removed from the tracklist, although they remain available as standalone promotional singles.

== Release history ==
Release dates and formats for High Anxiety
Region	Date	Format(s)	Edition	Label	Ref.
Worldwide	November 24, 2025	LP; CD; digital download; streaming	Standard	Listen To The Kids	
Worldwide	February 6, 2026	Digital download; streaming; LP	Deluxe	Listen To The Kids	
