= Playing w/ Fire =

2023 EP by Redveil

EP by Redveil
- Released: April 19, 2023
- Genre: Hip hop; Jazz rap
- Length: 15:44
- Producer: Redveil

Redveil chronology
Learn 2 Swim (2022)	Playing w/ Fire (2023)

Singles from Playing w/ Fire
- 1. "Giftbag" Released: March 22, 2023; 2. "Black Enuff" Released: April 5, 2023

Playing w/ Fire is the debut extended play by American rapper Redveil. The EP was self released on April 19, 2023. Playing w/ Fire was supported by two singles, "Giftbag" and "Black Enuff".

Playing w/ Fire was released to generally positive reviews, with critics praising Redveil's production, but disliking his new laid-back lyricism.

== Background ==
Playing w/ Fire is a follow-up to Redveil’s sophomore album, Learn 2 Swim, which was released on April 20, 2022. The first promotional single for the album, "Giftbag", was released on March 22, 2023. The next day, Redveil hinted at a new project during an interview with Rolling Stone India. A week later, Redveil announced the album’s second and final promotional single, "Black Enuff", which featured frequent collaborator JPEGMafia. "Black Enuff" was released on April 5, 2023. On the same day, Redveil officially announced the project as an EP along with its release date.

== Critical reception ==
Professional ratings
Review scores
Source	Rating
Pitchfork	6.5/10
HotNewHipHop	3.1/5

Playing w/ Fire was met with generally favorable reviews from critics. Writing for Pitchfork, Serge Selenou described the EP as boisterous and noted that it projects greater confidence compared to his previous album, Learn 2 Swim. Selenou also praised Redveil's production, but criticized the lyrics of the EP, which he considered to be "juvenile taunts" that left much to be desired. Louis Pavlakos of HipHopDX echoed similar concerns, feeling that Redveil traded in the depth of his previous work for his "newfound boastful energy". Pavlakos further criticized the Redveil's lyricism, saying they were "weightless and overzealous in his quest to be as carefree as possible." However, he noted that the track "Black Enuff" was a standout and had "a true statement".

== Track listing ==
All tracks are written by Marcus Morton; "Black Enuff" co-written by Barrington Hendricks. All tracks are produced by Redveil.

No.	Title	Length
1.	"Stuck"	1:36
2.	"Giftbag"	2:49
3.	"Black Enuff" (featuring JPEGMafia)	2:35
4.	"F2G" (featuring Mekdelawit)	2:37
5.	"Captain"	3:22
6.	"PWF"	2:45
Total length:		15:44
