= Whole Lotta Red =

Studio album by Playboi Carti
- Released: December 25, 2020
- Recorded: 2018 – November 2020
- Studios: Carter's home (Buckhead); Means Street (Atlanta); West Lake Ranch (Jackson Hole, Wyoming)
- Genres: Experimental hip-hop; rage; trap
- Length: 62:12
- Labels: AWGE; Interscope
- Producers: Art Dealer; F1lthy; Gab3; Jasper Harris; Jonah Abraham; Juberlee; KP Beatz; Lil 88; Lucian; Lukrative; Maaly Raw; Ojivolta; Outtatown; Pi'erre Bourne; Richie Souf; Roark Bailey; Ssort; Star Boy; Wheezy

Playboi Carti chronology
Die Lit (2018)	Whole Lotta Red (2020)	Music (2025)

Whole Lotta Red is the second studio album by the American rapper Playboi Carti. It was released on December 25, 2020, through AWGE and Interscope Records. It was primarily produced by F1lthy and Art Dealer, with contributions from Pi'erre Bourne, Maaly Raw, Lil 88, Jasper Harris, Ojivolta, and Wheezy, while Kanye West and Matthew Williams served as executive producers. Diverging from the melodic trap style of Playboi Carti (2017) and Die Lit (2018), Whole Lotta Red is an experimental hip-hop, rage, and trap album that incorporates punk and electronic influences. Its lyrical themes include guns, wealth, and hedonism. Music critics highlighted its loose structure and frenetic pace; several songs abandon traditional verse-chorus structures in favor of chants or ad-libbing with an emphasis on atmosphere over narrative. The album features a dark, vampire-themed tone in which Carti adopts the persona of a vampire rock star, and its abrasive sound drew comparisons to West's Yeezus (2013). Guest appearances include West, Kid Cudi, and Future.

Whole Lotta Red received generally positive reviews, with critics praising its production and Carti's vocals but criticizing its guest appearances and lack of depth. It debuted at number one on the US Billboard 200 with 100,000 album-equivalent units, becoming Carti's first US number-one album; in January 2022, it was certified Gold by the Recording Industry Association of America (RIAA). Despite its December 2020 release, multiple publications recognized it as one of 2021's best albums, and in 2022, Rolling Stone ranked it number 129 on its "200 Greatest Hip-Hop Albums of All Time" list. Upon release, Whole Lotta Red received a polarized response but was later credited with helping to define the rage subgenre of trap music and influencing many artists, including Yeat, Ken Carson, and Che, as well as a majority of the current underground rap scene. An accompanying tour began in October 2021.

== Background and recording ==
In May 2018, Playboi Carti released his debut studio album, Die Lit, executive-produced by Pi'erre Bourne. Three months later, in August 2018, he first revealed the title of his next project as Whole Lotta Red. In late 2018, after moving from Los Angeles back to Atlanta with his then-partner Iggy Azalea, Carti settled in the city's Buckhead neighborhood and began recording the album. Sessions took place primarily at DJ Drama's Means Street Studios and at his own home, where he often recorded alone during extended late-night stretches he referred to as "Carti hours". He described the process as deliberately private and solitary, limiting his routine to "studio and the house" while searching for new sounds and expanding his vocal range. While retaining his signature "baby voice", Carti experimented with higher-pitched falsetto and distorted deliveries that would become hallmarks of the record. He framed the album around a vampiric persona drawn from cult films such as The Lost Boys (1987) and Interview with the Vampire (1994), an aesthetic that permeated its imagery and themes. While recording, he drew additional inspiration from Tyler, the Creator's Goblin (2011) and other "psyched-out" or "evil" music and identified the Sex Pistols as his favorite band and Sid Vicious as a key influence and personal alter ego.

In a March 2019 GQ interview, Carti announced that Virgil Abloh would serve as creative director for the project. By mid-2019, he estimated he had recorded around fifty songs and was working with producers including Metro Boomin, Maaly Raw, Richie Souf, Don Cannon, and engineer Roark Bailey. Longtime collaborator Pi'erre Bourne, who had shaped Carti's earlier sound, played a reduced role compared to Die Lit, though Carti continued to credit his influence. In May 2019, an unreleased collaboration with Young Nudy titled "Pissy Pamper" leaked and reached number one on Spotify's US Viral 50 chart before being removed. Originally intended for Nudy and Bourne's Sli'merre (2019), the song was never officially released due to sample clearances. By late 2020, Carti had completed 16 tracks. After Kanye West agreed to executive-produce the album, the two recorded an additional 16 songs during sessions at West's studios in Jackson Hole, Wyoming, and Calabasas, California. Carti recorded the album with live performance foremost in mind, later stating that every song was designed to incite mosh pits and be performed onstage. He described treating his voice as an instrument, with ad-libs and layered vocals frequently becoming indistinguishable from the production itself; the album's harsher, raspy deliveries emerged organically from recording at high volumes with producer F1lthy rather than from a deliberate attempt to adopt a punk style.

== Composition and lyrics ==
Whole Lotta Red is an experimental hip-hop, rage, and trap album. Diverging from the melodic trap style of Playboi Carti (2017) and Die Lit, it incorporates 808 drums, synthesizers, drum machines, punk and electronic influences. Spanning 24 tracks over an hour, the album is built on chaotic synthesizers and distorted bass, with beats described by Paul A. Thompson of Pitchfork as bright and serrated. Carti's vocal performances range from rasping, guttural delivery to his high-pitched "baby voice", a variety that critics such as Thompson and Fred Thomas of AllMusic highlighted as central to the album's intensity. Lyrically, Whole Lotta Red focuses on guns, wealth, drugs, hedonism, women, and rockstar excess, conveyed through repetitive phrases, ad-libs, and crooned melodies. Prior to the album's release, in a November 2020 GQ interview, Carti described the album as "alternative" and "psyched out". Thompson characterized Carti's vocal variations as a defining element of the album's energy. Executive produced by Kanye West and Matthew Williams, the album was described for its dark, vampire-themed aesthetic.

"Slay3r"
"Slay3r" contains lyrics about potentially joining the American thrash metal band Slayer with jagged and off-balanced production.

Whole Lotta Red opens with "Rockstar Made", featuring distorted basslines and guitar-like synthesizers described by Kyann-Sian Williams of NME as suitable for mosh pits, with blown-out 808 drums and aggressive synthesizers. "Go2DaMoon", featuring West, was characterized as rushed and scrappy, resembling an unfinished interlude. "Stop Breathing" includes bells and 808 drums alongside Carti's staccato delivery, with the line "Ever since my brother died, I been thinking 'bout homicide"; Thomas of AllMusic described the blown-out instrumentals as complementing his vocal performances. "Beno!" features pixelated sounds reminiscent of Die Lit, with a beat that Thompson described as sounding "like an iPhone ringing in heaven" and highlighted for complementing a brief, personal aside about Carti buying his sister a Jeep. "JumpOutTheHouse" features Carti repeating "Jump out the house / [...] Jump out that bitch" more than 50 times in under two minutes; Thompson described its beat, produced by Richie Souf, as built on "sinister Atlanta rap scaffolding" reminiscent of a track an "agitated Gucci Mane might have jumped on in 2008", while highlighting the performance's "refreshing sense of humor" and looseness that allows "the zaniest idea to occasionally win". "M3tamorphosis", featuring Kid Cudi, includes layered ad-libs resembling goblin-like sounds and Carti chanting "Metamorphosis" seven times mid-verse, described by Tom Breihan of Stereogum as an instinctive blurt turning the word into a mantra. Thomas described it as creating an ominous atmosphere, while Semassa Boko of PopMatters viewed it as an overly long duet lacking excitement. "Slay3r" precedes "No Sl33p", which Thompson described as potentially built around a hummed reference to "Slay3r". It features jagged, off-balance production with hiccuping, echoing beats, described by Breihan of Stereogum as sounding like Atlanta trap gone hyperpop. It also features ascending synthesizers and distant chirps described by Mehan Jayasuriya of Pitchfork as "downright bubbly" compared to the album's prevalent post-Yeezus darkwave sound. Jayasuriya described that Carti's boast of potentially joining the American thrash metal band Slayer aligns with the band's leather-clad showmanship, blend of catchiness and confrontation, and arena-scale satanism.

"Control"
"Control" features Carti in a vulnerable love song over a hyperpop beat.

"Vamp Anthem" samples Johann Sebastian Bach's Toccata and Fugue in D Minor, chopped by KP Beatz and Jasper Harris; Thompson of Pitchfork highlighted that the dramatic organ sample is paired with Carti laying vocals in a black cape and plastic Halloween fangs, while Williams described the track as merely repetitive once its shock value has faded. "New N3on" and "Over" are among three songs that Thompson identified as having better-executed counterparts elsewhere on the album, with "New N3on" cited by Mimi Kenny of Beats Per Minute as an example of dully competent but ultimately tedious material. "Control" features Carti in a vulnerable love song over a hyperpop beat, highlighted by Williams for lines such as "I only want the best for you / I'll cure your love like a doctor", and includes an uncredited DJ Akademiks cameo in the opening seconds that Danny Schwartz of Rolling Stone called "inexplicable". "Punk Monk" includes the line "I gotta worry 'bout me", expressing exhaustion with unreliable associates. "On That Time" features heavy distortion contributing to punk energy, described by Schwartz as a standout. "King Vamp" represents Carti's progression to a vampire persona, with Medithi describing it as part of his evolution from pop star to rock star to "ruler of the undead". "Place" is a subdued collaboration with Pi'erre Bourne featuring minimalist 808 drums and elongated synthesizers, described by Williams as "nostalgic" and "harking back" to the "mellow magic" of earlier tracks such as "Magnolia" (2017). "ILoveUIHateU" features fluttering production and was highlighted by Uproxx as "frantic and skin-tingling trap", alongside "Meh". "Die4Guy" includes the jittery lines "If I die it's gon' be real sad / So I fuck on my bitch like it's our last / I'm a rockstar so I never can relax", which Medithi linked to the album's distillation of fearful isolation. "Not PLaying" features rapid, distorted synthesizer patterns that contribute to the "dizzying neon gyrations" described by Medithi. The closing track, "F33l Lik3 Dyin", samples Bon Iver and features melodic singing about Carti's relationship with his mother, including the lines "My mama always knew I was a star / She gave me the keys to her only car / I took that bitch and I went far".

== Release and promotion ==
Carti began teasing Whole Lotta Red in late 2018, when he performed unreleased songs during his Neon Tour. In July 2019, Carti continued teasing the album at a Milwaukee show, stating it would be released within 60 days without features. In October 2019, Carti posted Instagram photos captioned "him <3 red incoming" and "<48hours! locked in". On April 14, 2020, Carti teased the single "@ Meh" by sharing its cover art on Twitter, releasing the track two days later as the lead single for Whole Lotta Red. The song, featuring Carti's signature "baby voice", achieved commercial success, peaking at number 35 on the US Billboard Hot 100. On the same day, a music video for "@ Meh", co-directed by Carti and Nick Walker, was released. On November 23, 2020, Carti announced that Whole Lotta Red had been submitted to his label. On November 30, musician Mario Judah announced on Instagram that he would release his own version of Whole Lotta Red due to Carti's delays, which he did on December 11. Before the album's release, Carti teased collaborations with Kanye West, Kid Cudi, Travis Scott, and Future, and suggested possible features from Post Malone and Pharrell Williams. Media personality DJ Akademiks announced that Whole Lotta Red would be released on Christmas Day with West as executive producer, stating he "nearly sold his soul" for the information. On December 21, Carti announced the album's cover art and release date.

The cover, designed by Art Dealer, pays homage to the late 1970s punk fanzine Slash, which featured David Vanian of the Damned on its cover. The cover's left side, beside the parental advisory label, reads "Volume One Number One Of Red" and "The Wonderful World of Red/Mayday Issue 12/25", referencing a fictional magazine from Carti's Opium imprint. Journalists highlighted that the album's imagery and merchandise designs draw from heavy metal aesthetics. After several leaks, Whole Lotta Red was released on December 25. On the same day, the music video for the track "M3tamorphosis", featuring Kid Cudi, was released, directed by Nico Ballesteros. On December 27, Carti posted on Twitter asking fans which songs they wanted on a planned deluxe edition of the album. Despite the announcement, no deluxe edition was ever released. On January 20, 2021, Carti performed "Slay3r" on The Tonight Show Starring Jimmy Fallon. On April 2, the music video for "Sky" was released. Directed by Nick Walker, the video depicts Carti and his crew causing chaos in a grocery store, with a green-tinted aesthetic and faux security camera footage. The video, featuring a cameo from Opium signee Destroy Lonely, had garnered over 100 million YouTube views by April 2025. Between October 14 and December 23, 2021, Carti embarked on the King Vamp Tour, originally titled the Narcissist Tour, performing across various cities in North America. On October 13, 2025, Carti teased six different vinyl designs ahead of the album's fifth-year anniversary.

== Critical reception ==
Whole Lotta Red ratings
Aggregate scores
Source	Rating
AnyDecentMusic?	6.6/10
Metacritic	75/100
Review scores
Source	Rating
AllMusic	4/5 stars
And It Don't Stop	(1-star Honorable Mention)
Beats Per Minute	27%
HipHopDX	4.4/5
NME	3/5 stars
Pitchfork	8.3/10
PopMatters	7/10
Rolling Stone	4/5 stars
Spectrum Culture	80%

According to the review aggregator Metacritic, Whole Lotta Red received "generally favorable reviews" based on a weighted average score of 75 out of 100 from 7 critic scores. The aggregator AnyDecentMusic? gave it 6.6 out of 10, based on its assessment of the critical consensus.

Fred Thomas reviewed the album for AllMusic, lauding the "blown-out instrumentals" and "demonic vocal performances". Paul A. Thompson of Pitchfork described Whole Lotta Red as "both wildly innovative and strikingly consistent", praising the "bright and serrated beats" and Carti's "outré, expressive" vocals. Danny Schwartz of Rolling Stone praised the album's eccentric performance style, describing that Carti expressed emotion in an elusive, theatrical manner that made him seem "more enigmatic than ever". Semassa Boko of PopMatters observed that the album showed Carti's willingness to experiment and evolve stylistically but felt that it would have benefited from more guest appearances. Colin Dempsey of Spectrum Culture praised the album, stating, "Carti comes into his own by stepping into the coffin of a vampire, scoffing at every critique tossed towards his vaudeville fangs". Vivian Medithi of HipHopDX said, "Semi-automatic Dracos are made in Romania, and Dracula was too. Whole Lotta Red is the sound of a new legend dying to be born. It'll be album of the year in 2022". Both Thomas of AllMusic and Vivian Medithi of HipHopDX compared its bold, polarizing vision to West's Yeezus (2013) for its divisive, uncompromising approach.

Kyann-Sian Williams of NME offered a mixed review, suggesting that while the album could seem uneven at first, it became more engaging with repeated listening. She also commented that its 24-track length limited its variety. Mimi Kenny of Beats Per Minute gave the album a negative review, describing it as lacking substance and consistency, with Carti adopting exaggerated personas rather than showing authenticity. Critic Robert Christgau highlighted "Rockstar Made" and "Punk Monk" while conceding that Carti "sounds like nobody else" but concluded that he "means as little as any rapper of consequence ever". Guest appearances, including Kanye West on "Go2DaMoon" and Future on "Teen X", were seen as lackluster by Pitchfork and PopMatters, with critics highlighting they failed to match Carti's commanding presence.

=== Accolades ===
Whole Lotta Red appeared on several year-end lists for 2021, despite its December 2020 release. Rolling Stone named it the best hip-hop album of 2021 and included it at number 36 on its "50 Best Albums of 2021" list, with writer J.I. describing it as "one of the most forward-thinking rap records since Kanye West's Yeezus" and describing its "fingerprints... all over everything we heard in 2021". Alphonse Pierre of Pitchfork placed it at number 36 on its "50 Best Albums of 2021" list, calling it "an all-time heat check" and praising its "blown-out beats that blend hypnotic melodies with drums that twitch and boom like a tweaked-out Godzilla". Tom Breihan of Stereogum included it on its unranked year-end list, describing it as "an hour of blown-out, pill-gobbling brain-melt jibber-jabber" and describing Carti is "at his best when he's unmoored". The album also appeared on lists from The Washington Post, The New York Times, and The Fader. In 2024, Pitchfork ranked it number two on its "100 Best Albums of the 2020s So Far" list, with Samuel Hyland writing that it "anticipated our feverish, self-actualizing rap landscape" and sounded like "the death throes of a vampiric cyborg".

Select rankings of Whole Lotta Red
Publication	List	Rank	Ref.
The Fader	The 50 Best Albums of 2021	45	
The New York Times	Jon Caramanica's Best Albums of 2020	9	
Pitchfork	The 50 Best Albums of 2021	9	
Pitchfork	The 100 Best Albums of the 2020s So Far	2	
Rolling Stone	The 50 Best Albums of 2021	11	
Rolling Stone	The 20 Best Hip-Hop Albums of 2021	1	
Rolling Stone	The 200 Greatest Hip-Hop Albums of All Time	129	
Stereogum	The 10 Best Rap Albums of 2021	5	
The Washington Post	Best Music of 2021	1	

== Legacy and influence ==
Upon its release, Whole Lotta Red received a polarized response from listeners but was later credited with helping to define the rage subgenre of trap music. Gabriel Bras Nevares of HotNewHipHop wrote that, despite its mixed early reception, "as happened with Kanye West's 808s & Heartbreak (2008) twelve years prior, a mixed reception preceded one of the most influential albums of the next few years". Nevares described the album's sound as "raw, in your face, and completely chaotic" and described that "many young producers and rappers would seek to replicate Whole Lotta Red's stand-out moments and mold it into a defined sound". Rolling Stone called it "one of the most forward-thinking rap albums since Yeezus" and later named it the best rap album of 2021. In 2022, Rolling Stone ranked Whole Lotta Red at number 129 on their "The 200 Greatest Hip-Hop Albums of All Time" list, with writer Jeff Ihaza stating that the album "is sure to reveal itself to be the shift's seminal text" in the intertwining of rock music and rap, and affirming Carti's prediction that its sound would become "regular and relevant in the future" with "He's not wrong." In 2024, HotNewHipHop named it the greatest hip-hop album released in the 2020s up to that point, with writer Alex Cole stating: "You cannot talk about 2020s hip-hop without mentioning Whole Lotta Red." In 2025, Complex named Whole Lotta Red the fifteenth-best album of the 21st century, with writer Antonio Johri describing it as the "big bang" of rage, crediting Carti with fusing scattered underground elements into a chart-topping, culture-shifting project that birthed an entire subgenre and directly ignited the wave of artists including 2Slimey, Yeat, Che, Xaviersobased, OsamaSon, Nettspend, and 2hollis.

According to Nevares, the album's influence was identifiable in its "buzzing synths, compressed and hyper-aggressive drum patterns and bass, and repetitive lyrics that were now screamed instead of crooned", traits that became central to the developing rage subgenre. He described that while other artists "laid the groundwork", Carti "put all the pieces together to define rage as a genre while already being one of hip-hop's most influential artists". The album influenced numerous contemporary underground hip-hop albums, including Che's Rest in Bass (2025), which Pitchfork described as "the platonic ideal of rage rap", with Che containing "10 Whole Lotta Reds' worth of Playboi Carti within his chest", as well as 2Slimey's High Anxiety, Yeat's Up 2 Me (2021), Ken Carson's Project X (2021), and A Great Chaos (2023). In 2025, The Guardian credited Whole Lotta Red as "a massive influence on a whole generation of rage rap from Yeat to Ken Carson, OsamaSon, and numerous other noisy young MCs".

== Commercial performance ==
Whole Lotta Red debuted at number one on the US Billboard 200 with 100,000 album-equivalent units (including 10,000 pure album sales) in its first week. This became Carti's first US number-one debut and his second top 10 album. The album also accumulated a total of 126.43 million on-demand streams for its tracks, in the week ending December 31, 2020. On January 11, 2022, the album was certified Gold by the Recording Industry Association of America (RIAA) for combined sales and streams in excess of 500,000 units in the United States.

== Track listing ==
Whole Lotta Red track listing
No.	Title	Writer(s)	Producer(s)	Length
1.	"Rockstar Made"	Jordan Carter; Richard Ortiz; Jonah Abraham	F1lthy; Abraham	3:13
2.	"Go2DaMoon" (featuring Kanye West)	Carter; Kanye West; Wesley Glass; Tobias Dekker	Wheezy; Outtatown	1:59
3.	"Stop Breathing"	Carter; Ortiz; Pierre Thevenot; Thomas Ross	F1lthy; Lukrative; Ssort	3:38
4.	"Beno!"	Carter; Dekker; Jalan Lowe	Outtatown; Lil 88	2:33
5.	"JumpOutTheHouse"	Carter; Tony Sun	Richie Souf	1:33
6.	"M3tamorphosis" (featuring Kid Cudi)	Carter; Scott Mescudi; Ortiz; Gabriel Rousseau	F1lthy; Gab3	5:12
7.	"Slay3r"	Carter; Roark Bailey; Jeffrey Shannon	Bailey; Juberlee	2:44
8.	"No Sl33p"	Carter; Kenneth Pannu	KP Beatz; Abraham	1:28
9.	"New Tank"	Carter; Ortiz; Abraham	F1lthy; Abraham	1:29
10.	"Teen X" (featuring Future)	Carter; Nayvadius Wilburn; Jamaal Henry	Maaly Raw	3:25
11.	"Meh"	Carter; Dekker; Jung Cho; Anton Mendo	Outtatown; Art Dealer; Star Boy	1:58
12.	"Vamp Anthem"	Carter; Pannu; Jasper Harris	KP Beatz; Harris	2:04
13.	"New N3on"	Carter; Henry	Maaly Raw	1:56
14.	"Control"	Carter; Dekker; Cho; Mendo	Outtatown; Art Dealer; Star Boy	3:17
15.	"Punk Monk"	Carter; Ortiz; Thevenot; Ștefan Cișmigiu	F1lthy; Lukrative; Lucian	3:49
16.	"On That Time"	Carter; Ortiz; Mark Williams; Raul Cubina	F1lthy; Ojivolta	1:42
17.	"King Vamp"	Carter; Cho	Art Dealer; Outtatown; Star Boy	3:06
18.	"Place"	Carter; Jordan Jenks	Pi'erre Bourne	1:57
19.	"Sky"	Carter; Cho	Art Dealer	3:13
20.	"Over"	Carter; Cho	Art Dealer	2:46
21.	"ILoveUIHateU"	Carter; Jenks	Pi'erre Bourne	2:15
22.	"Die4Guy"	Carter; Cho	Art Dealer; Outtatown; Star Boy	2:11
23.	"Not PLaying"	Carter; Cho	Art Dealer	2:10
24.	"F33l Lik3 Dyin"	Carter; Bailey; Sun; Justin Vernon; James Blake; Rob Moose; Bradley Cook; Michael Lewis; Michael Noyce; Brandon Burton; Jeremy Nutzman; Channy Leaneagh; Glass; Josh Berg	Bailey; Richie Souf	3:24
Total length:				62:12

Sample credits

- "Go2DaMoon" contains an uncredited sample from "Soul of Bobby Theme, Pt. 2", written by Laxmikant Shantaram Kudalkar and Pyarelal Ramprasad Sharma.
- "Stop Breathing" contains an uncredited interpolation from "Shirt Off", written by Radric Davis, Xavier Dotson, Nyquan Malphurs and Greg Hogan, and performed by Gucci Mane, Wooh da Kid and Frenchie.
- "Vamp Anthem" contains an uncredited interpolation from the Toccata and Fugue in D minor, attributed to Johann Sebastian Bach.
- "Control" features an uncredited vocal sample of DJ Akademiks.
- "F33l Lik3 Dyin" contains a sample from "iMi", written by Justin Vernon, James Blake, Rob Moose, Bradley Cook, Michael Lewis, Michael Noyce, Brandon Burton, Jeremy Nutzman, Channy Leaneagh, Wesley Glass and Josh Berg, as performed by Bon Iver.

== Personnel ==
Credits adapted from the album's liner notes and Tidal.

- Kanye West – executive producer
- Matthew Williams – executive producer
- Marcus Fritz – mixer (all tracks), recording engineer (1–4, 6–9, 11, 12, 14–17, 19, 20, 22–24)
- Roark Bailey – mixer (all tracks), recording engineer (5, 7, 10, 13, 21)
- William J. Sullivan – mixer (6)
- Collin Leonard – mastering engineer
- Josh Berg – recording engineer (2)
- Liz Robson – recording engineer (18)
- Pi'erre Bourne – recording engineer (18)

== Charts ==
=== Weekly charts ===
Weekly chart performance of Whole Lotta Red
Chart (2020–2026)	Peak position
Australian Albums (ARIA)	15
Austrian Albums (Ö3 Austria)	49
Belgian Albums (Ultratop Flanders)	18
Belgian Albums (Ultratop Wallonia)	74
Canadian Albums (Billboard)	2
Dutch Albums (Album Top 100)	7
Finnish Albums (Suomen virallinen lista)	11
German Albums (Offizielle Top 100)	45
Greek Albums (IFPI)	26
Irish Albums (Official Charts)	18
Lithuanian Albums (AGATA)	2
New Zealand Albums (RMNZ)	8
Norwegian Albums (VG-lista)	5
Polish Albums (ZPAV)	30
Portuguese Albums (AFP)	166
Portuguese Albums (AFP) 5 Year Anniversary edition	184
Swedish Albums (Sverigetopplistan)	37
Swiss Albums (Schweizer Hitparade)	4
UK Albums (Official Charts)	17
US Billboard 200	1
US Top R&B/Hip-Hop Albums (Billboard)	1

=== Year-end charts ===
2021 year-end chart performance for Whole Lotta Red
Chart (2021)	Position
US Billboard 200	91
US Top R&B/Hip-Hop Albums (Billboard)	60

2022 year-end chart performance for Whole Lotta Red
Chart (2022)	Position
Lithuanian Albums (AGATA)	91
US Billboard 200	88
US Top R&B/Hip-Hop Albums (Billboard)	67

2023 year-end chart performance for Whole Lotta Red
Chart (2023)	Position
US Billboard 200	160

== Certifications ==
Certifications for Whole Lotta Red
Region	Certification	Certified units/sales
Denmark (IFPI Danmark)	Gold	10,000^{‡}
Poland (ZPAV)	2× Platinum	40,000^{‡}
United Kingdom (BPI)	Gold	100,000^{‡}
United States (RIAA)	Gold	500,000^{‡}
^{‡} Sales+streaming figures based on certification alone.

== Release history ==
Release history for Whole Lotta RedRelease history
Date	Format(s)	Edition(s)	Label	Ref.
December 25, 2020	Digital download; streaming	Standard	AWGE; Interscope	
May 28, 2021	2LP	Standard	AWGE; Interscope	
April 25, 2025	2LP	Standard	AWGE; Interscope	
December 5, 2025	2LP	5 Year Anniversary Edition Store Exclusive	AWGE; Interscope	
December 5, 2025	2LP	5 Year Anniversary Edition (Spotify Fans First)	AWGE; Interscope	
December 5, 2025	2LP	5 Year Anniversary Edition (Target Exclusive)	AWGE; Interscope	
December 5, 2025	2LP	Interscope Vinyl Collective (IVC)	AWGE; Interscope	
December 5, 2025	CD	Standard	AWGE; Interscope	

== See also ==
- List of Billboard 200 number-one albums of 2021
