= 2Slimey =

Mexican-American rapper (born 2006)

2slimey
- Also known as: GGS; King of Mexico
- Born: Sergio Garcia; January 24, 2006 (age 20); Midwest City, Oklahoma, U.S.
- Genres: Rage; Boom bap (early)
- Occupations: Rapper; songwriter
- Instrument: Vocals
- Years active: 2016–present
- Label: LISTEN TO THE KIDS
- Website: https://2slimey.us/

Sergio Garcia (born January 24, 2006), known professionally as 2slimey, is a Mexican-American rapper. Known for his usage of heavy bass and distortion across his music, he first rose to prominence within the underground rap scene in 2024 after a snippet of his track "Shrimp" went viral online. His releases include a 2024 mixtape SsoMe and his 2025 debut studio album High Anxiety. A rerelease of the latter, titled More Anxiety, was released in 2026, while another studio album, Straight Edge, is scheduled to release in November 2026.

== Early life ==
Sergio Garcia was born on January 24, 2006, to Mexican immigrants in Midwest City, Oklahoma. Garcia described living in Oklahoma as "slow-paced". Growing up, he originally aspired to be a professional basketball player, but he quit due to seeing more advantaged players. During his time in Oklahoma, Garcia worked a variety of jobs. His employment has included working at a grocery store, a restaurant, and a 7-Eleven, which he quit after three days due to the people he encountered there.

== Career ==
=== Early career and rise to fame: 2021–2025 ===
Garcia began making music in the mid-2010s under the name GGS, initially producing traditional rap. In 2016, amidst the boom of the SoundCloud era, Garcia became a fan of artists such as Smokepurpp, Lil Pump, and XXXTentacion. Garcia began releasing music under the alias "2slimey" in 2021. His breakout track, "Shrimp", was released on March 16, 2024, and gained notoriety for its unique sound on TikTok. On November 29, 2024, Garcia released his debut mixtape, titled SsoMe. On November 14, 2025, Garcia released his debut studio album, titled High Anxiety, composed of 13 tracks and a feature from Izaya Tiji.

=== Further releases and performances: 2025–present ===
In January 2026, Garcia was announced to make his debut at Rolling Loud 2026 in Orlando, Florida. On February 6, 2026, Garcia released the deluxe edition of his November album, titled More Anxiety. On February 20, 2026, Garcia appeared in the Underground Sound 2026 cypher alongside RainingLol, Sixbill, and Matt Proxy, among others. On April 13, 2026, it was announced that Garcia would be performing at the 2026 The Lyrical Lemonade Summer Smash festival in Chicago, Illinois. This marked Garcia's second-ever major performance. On May 8, 2026, Garcia performed at Rolling Loud. On June 13, Garcia performed at Summer Smash while making a guest appearance on PlaqueBoyMax's set. On June 26, 2026, Garcia released his EP TotalBass, which paid homage to Michael Jackson's 1991 studio album Dangerous. On Halloween 2026, Garcia, alongside other artists such as OsamaSon and Waka Flocka Flame, performed at the Gods Of Chaos concert at Chicago. On October 30, 2026, Garcia was scheduled to release his debut studio album Straight Edge, however, the album was delayed due to issues with Garcia's record label according to a video posted shortly after midnight across his socials.

== Musical style and artistry ==
2Slimey is viewed as a polarizing rapper, with reviewers often sharing mixed feelings regarding him. Complex described Garcia's music as "weird, off-kilter rhythms of the neo-jerk wave", blended with "the bit-crushed drums of hyperpop, and covers it all in deep-fried distortion", and compared his style to noise musician Merzbow. Kieran Press-Reynolds of Pitchfork wrote that Garcia's releases had been preceded by the influence of Luci4. Mano Sundaresan of Pitchfork wrote that Garcia's vocals "echo like a poltergeist over a beat that feels like the Giga-zombie running at you in 28 Years Later."

Alphonse Pierre of Pitchfork felt skeptical about Garcia's music, writing how Garcia's attention is strange and that he lacks personality but represents the current wave of rage rap. Olivier Lafontant of the same magazine company was fairly critical yet analytical when describing Garcia's music. He wrote that Garcia's popularity is mostly about internet virality and novelty and that he is a product of it. Lafontant compared Garcia to fellow rapper Yeat and his album 2 Alive, stating that Yeat has catchiness and identity, which Garcia lacks. He also wrote about how people are drawn to Garcia's music because of the meme aspect and appearance.

Music critic Anthony Fantano noted similarities between Garcia's sound and power electronics, as well as noise music.

Antonio Johri of Complex compared Garcia to Che, albeit with an extreme sound. He noted that Garcia's music mixes hyperpop, rage rap, digicore, and noise, also noting that his songs are intentionally very loud, distorted, and chaotic, with heavy bass and aggressive AutoTune. He notes the sound as overwhelming yet surprisingly catchy, with songs like "Meat", adding that Garcia was pushing rage rap to its limits.

Alexander Cole of HotNewHipHop wrote that Garcia's music is a "barrage of sounds", which the youth seems to enjoy. Gabriel Bras Nevares of the same website wrote how Garcia is one of the most diverse rage artists in the scene.

== Reception ==
Garcia has been co-signed by other hip-hop artists such as Kanye West, Playboi Carti, West's daughter North West, PlaqueBoyMax and Lil Uzi Vert. According to Dazed, Frost Children's Lulu Prost stated that his music should be burned with fire. Complex listed Garcia as the 98th-hottest rapper on their 100 Hottest Rappers Right Now list as of April 2026.

== Personal life ==
As of 2026, Garcia lives in Los Angeles, California. Earlier in his childhood, Garcia dealt with sleep paralysis and has stated he has arachnophobia.

== Discography ==
=== Studio albums ===
Title	Details
High Anxiety	Released: November 14, 2025; Label: Self-released; Format: Digital download, streaming, compact disc, vinyl
Straight Edge	Scheduled: December 2026; Label: LISTEN TO THE KIDS; Format: Digital download, streaming

=== Reissued albums ===
Title	Details
More Anxiety	Released: February 6, 2026; Label: LISTEN TO THE KIDS; Format: Digital download, streaming

=== Mixtapes ===
Title	Details
SsoMe	Released: November 29, 2024; Label: Self-released; Format: Digital download, streaming

=== EPs ===
Title	Details
Totalbass	Released: June 26, 2026; Label: LISTEN TO THE KIDS; Format: Digital download, streaming

=== Singles ===
==== As lead artist ====
List of singles as lead artist, showing year released and album name
Title	Year	Album
"Topslime" (featuring BBKnight)	2021	Non-album singles
"Topslime 2.0" (featuring Smoove Dinero)	2021	Non-album singles
"Kutta" (featuring Nutso Thugn)	2021	Non-album singles
"On Glo!"	2022	Non-album singles
"Dead Opps"	2022	Non-album singles
"2 Wick!"	2022	Non-album singles
"Racks 2 Me"	2022	Non-album singles
"Skelly"	2023	Non-album singles
"Redeye"	2023	Non-album singles
"Xtra Rich"	2023	Non-album singles
"Kullinan"	2023	Non-album singles
"Not Over Me"	2023	Non-album singles
"Glo Reign"	2024	Non-album singles
"Shrimp"	2024	SsoMe
"Swamp"	2024	Non-album singles
"No Diddy"	2024	Non-album singles
"PSA" (featuring BabySolid)	2024	Non-album singles
"Traplantix"	2024	Non-album singles
"Hollow Tips"	2024	Non-album singles
"Kreep"	2024	Non-album singles
"Mike Vixk"	2024	Non-album singles
"Spinkrew"	2024	Non-album singles
"SsoSlime" (featuring Yhapojj)	2024	Non-album singles
"Tmz"	2024	Non-album singles
"Hit da Feet" (featuring Wildkarduno)	2024	Non-album singles
"Rude" (featuring Lil Novi)	2024	Non-album singles
"Serena"	2024	SsoMe
"Zoo Bity"	2024	Non-album singles
"Bin laden"	2024	Non-album singles
"Daniel Larson"	2024	Non-album singles
"Slimekoat"	2024	Non-album singles
"Reef"	2025	Non-album singles
"Munyun"	2025	Non-album singles
"Healin"	2025	Non-album singles
"S3x"	2025	Non-album singles
"Jungle"	2025	Non-album singles
"Surf"	2025	Non-album singles
"No Auto" (featuring Samosthated)	2025	Non-album singles
"Krispy"	2025	Non-album singles
"Pounds n Counters"	2025	Non-album singles
"Vet"	2025	Non-album singles
"Live in Bass"	2025	High Anxiety
"Meat"	2025	High Anxiety
"Giraffes"	2025	Non-album single
"Kitgo"	2025	High Anxiety
"Race Car"	2025	High Anxiety
"Belly"	2025	More Anxiety
"2slimey Cypher Verse" (with Underground Sound)	2026	UGS 2026 Cypher
"Times Changin"	2026	Non-album singles
"Free Slimey"	2026	Non-album singles
"Money Dumb" (with Noah Mejia)	2026	Totalbass
“Kno You”	2026	Non-album single
"Lobby"	2026	Totalbass
"Why You Wanna Hate On Meh"	2026	Totalbass
"Luv Cup"	2026	Straight Edge
"Doug Fit"	2026	Straight Edge
"Critical"	2026	Straight Edge
"Die For This"	2026	Straight Edge
"Say Sum"	2026	Straight Edge

==== As featured artist ====
List of singles as featured artist, showing year released and album name
Title	Year	Album
"Morse Code" (Acid Souljah featuring 2Slimey and Shadow Wizard Money Gang)	2024	Non-album singles
"#RR" (B00 Rari featuring 2Slimey)	2024	Non-album singles
"2 da A" (Stonedef Exclusives featuring 2Slimey and Bluehunnidkb)	2024	Krash
"Acid" (Book Club featuring 2Slimey and Hooligan Lou)	2025	Non-album singles
"Payne" (Maku15 featuring 2Slimey)	2025	Non-album singles
"Built This" (Afeza featuring 2Slimey)	2025	Non-album singles
"Bailando" (Afeza featuring 2Slimey)	2025	Non-album singles
"PoliceK" (1ManJay featuring 2Slimey)	2025	Non-album singles

=== Guest appearances ===
List of non-single guest appearances, with other performing artists, showing year released and album name
Title	Year	Other artist(s)	Album
"Me Atreví"	2025	Afeza	Forgotten Boys / Niños Olvidados
"Rude"	2025	Gxner	Sanctuary
"Kry"	2025	Brokensippycup	Livethru Me

== Tours ==
=== Headlining ===
- No Bass No Fun (2026)
- Straight Bass Tour (2026)
