= Experimental Rap (album) =

2026 studio album by JPEGMafia

- Standard album cover

Studio album by JPEGMafia
- Released: May 21, 2026
- Recorded: 2025
- Genres: Experimental hip-hop; industrial hip-hop
- Length: 52:58
- Label: AWAL
- Producers: JPEGMafia; Billy Ray Schlag

JPEGMafia chronology
We Live in a Society (2025)	Experimental Rap (2026)

Singles from Experimental Rap
- 1. "Babygirl" Released: April 30, 2026; 2. "War Over Land" Released: May 7, 2026; 3. "¥ (Yen)" Released: May 16, 2026; 4. "$ (Money)" Released: May 20, 2026

Experimental Rap (stylized in all caps) is the sixth studio album by American rapper and record producer JPEGMafia. It was released through AWAL on May 21, 2026. The album was a follow-up to his fifth studio album, I Lay Down My Life for You (2024).

On April 30, JPEGMafia released the album's lead single, "Babygirl". In promotion of the album, The Experimental Rap Tour, a North American tour, is set to take place between September and October 2026. Upon release, the album received generally mixed reviews from music critics, who generally praised the project's production, though criticized the repetitive lyrics and flow, especially in comparison to JPEGMafia's previous works.

== Background ==
On August 1, 2024, American rapper and record producer JPEGMafia released his fifth studio album, I Lay Down My Life for You, to positive reviews from music critics. To promote the album, he went on the Lay Down My Life Tour that ran from August to September 2024. In addition, he was a supporting act for Linkin Park on their From Zero World Tour from June to September 2025.

Between the early year of 2025 and early year of 2026, JPEGMafia released the Director's Cut edition of the 2024's I Lay Down My Life for You in February. In May, he released his collaborative extended play,We Live in a Society, with Australian electronic musician Flume. The following month, JPEGMafia collaborated with hip-hop duo Joey Valence & Brae on their single "Wassup", and appearing on the track "Nola" from Kevin Abstract's Blush. JPEGMafia provided additional vocals for (Trinidad" from Geese's Getting Killed, which was released that September. In October, JPEGMafia released the Director's Cut edition of his 2023 collaborative studio album, Scaring the Hoes, with Danny Brown, and in January 2026, produced Maxo Kream and Denzel Curry's collaborative single "Fake Jeezy".

During in an interview with Pigeons & Planes in May 2026, JPEGMafia described his decision to name the album Experimental Rap, claiming that others in the sub-genre "pretend and try to be cool" with replicating another musician's style and that he could just be himself and "let other people try to figure out who they are at 40 or whatever." These comments led into a publicized feud with Earl Sweatshirt, with fans viewing these promotional comments from JPEGMafia as him subliminally criticizing Sweatshirt's recent forays into ambient and plugg. In addition, the title's idea comes from JPEGMafia claiming to be a dominant figure in experimental hip-hop.

=== Sampling dispute ===
Shortly after the release of Experimental Rap, a Reddit user claiming to be a "friend" of Chicago screamo band We Weren't Invited accused JPEGMafia of sampling their song "Personality Collector" (2022) on the latter's track "Tsar Bomba" without permission nor credit. On May 30, JPEGMafia revealed on Instagram that We Weren't Invited asked for proper credit, $2,000, and 20% of the net proceeds and copyright to "Tsar Bomba". Because of this, JPEGMafia decided to remove the song from Experimental Rap.

== Music and lyrics ==
=== Overview ===
Experimental Rap is an experimental hip-hop and industrial hip-hop album with electronic, gospel, industrial, punk, and rock influences. The album consists of 25 tracks in a running time of 52 minutes, being JPEGMafia's longest solo project. Lyrically, JPEGMafia emphasizes themes of braggadocio, women, and pop culture references while retaining a triple-time flow.

Peter Berry of Okayplayer described the album's production as "a nervy mosaic of eclectic sounds and twitchy raps", comparing it to musician Skrillex. According to the album's press release, JPEGMafia considered Experimental Rap to be the "most adventurous record" he made. Experimental Rap was solely written, produced, and mixed by him with mastering by Dale Becker in 2025.

=== Tracks ===
The album begins with "投影の芸術" (transl. "The Art of Projection"), which samples a routine performed by comedian Paul Rooney, which pokes fun at "white fragility." With a punk influence, "Babygirl" features heavy metal guitars and a looped "militaristic" vocal sample of Saul Williams's "Tr(n)igger" (2007). "Pop This Heat" incorporates a Brenda Russell sample alongside a gospel influence. Described as a "frenetic IDM-punk" track, "Since I Met Ye" shows JPEGMafia defending his association with Kanye West that the former's fans criticized.

"¥ (Yen)" uses a glitch-hop style while its lyrics are based on wealth and paranoia. NME writer Luke Britton described the track's production as "an arcade machine falling headfirst into The Matrix." "Mask On" emphasizes shock value bars, of which JPEGMafia claims "the 'little boys' making up his competition can't touch him like Epstein". On the same track, he references 8-Ball's "Mr. Big". "His Will" is an interlude reminiscent of a prayer. "Lights" repurposes the horn West used on "All of the Lights" (2010) into sometimes more "dystopian", "holy", and "hellish".

"War Over Land" presents a more cinematic sound where JPEGMafia uses an expressive flow over an instrumental built on strings, pianos, and "wailing" electric guitars. On "Chat", JPEGMafia uses a "bait and switch" verse with anti-cop commentary, where he proclaims that Derek Chauvin should be "free" only "so they can put that bitch in the ground." On "The 1st Amendment", JPEGMafia opens the track with four "lethal" bars related to Charlie Kirk.

== Promotion and release ==
JPEGMafia toured with Redveil (pictured) and Matt Proxy on the Experimental Rap Tour.

On April 30, 2026, JPEGMafia announced his sixth studio album, Experimental Rap, revealing its cover artwork, release date of May 21, and added that pre-orders were available and that he would go on a concert tour in support of the album. On the same day, JPEGMafia released its lead single, "Babygirl", with an accompanying music video. The music video centers on a nude woman who is surrounded by a military unit, saluting her "before marching into an abandoned industrial building". It later gets set to monochrome when they all get covered in the rain.

On May 7, JPEGMafia released the album's second single, "War Over Land", with an accompanying music video co-directed by him and Fields. Made to look like a single-shot music video, it begins with a man who commits suicide with a gun to his head before panning over to a group filming the incident on their phones. JPEGMafia then walks through a field where children with guns, a stripper, a "zooming" Cybertruck, and a "desperate" mother appears close to him. On May 16, JPEGMafia released the third single from Experimental Rap, "¥ (Yen)", along with a "lo-fi" music video.

On May 20, JPEGMafia released the album's fourth and final single, "$ (Money)", with an accompanying music video. The following day, Experimental Rap was released to digital streaming providers through AWAL. Comparted to his previous releases, JPEGMafia publicly requested multiple publications, including Pitchfork and GQ, to stop reporting on him. On the same day, JPEGMafia released the music video for "$ (Money)". All of the album's music videos were directed by JPEGMafia and Logan Fields.

=== Tour ===
To promote Experimental Rap, JPEGMafia went on North American leg of the Experimental Rap Tour to promote the album, which began on September 22, in Spokane and concluded on October 24, in Atlanta. The tour was in North America, and its supporting acts were Redveil and Matt Proxy. Announced on September 7, the European leg of the tour will begin on February 13, 2027, in Milan and conclude on February 26, in London.

== Critical reception ==
Professional ratings
Review scores
Source	Rating
NME	3.5/5 stars
Pitchfork	5.5/10
Whynow	3/5 stars

Experimental Rap received mixed reviews from music critics. Peter Berry of Okayplayer considered the album to be "solid on the first few listens", although he stated that the album may have been better if slightly shortened. Reflecting on JPEGMafia's feud with Earl Sweatshirt, Berry favored Experimental Rap for its "abrasive weirdness" over the latter's collaborative album with Mike and Surf Gang, Pompeii // Utility (2026), which he considered to be "monotonously foggy". While Berry saw the title of JPEGMafia's album as "more of an adjective", he emphasized that it was okay "not to play around too much with the formula."

Although Tom Breihan of Stereogum considered Experimental Rap to be good, he presented a more critical perspective on the album, in. He considered the album to be an intentional backlash from JPEGMafia with "jagged, trollish music". Despite its title, Breihan noted that the album may not be experimental as JPEGMafia stuck with a consistent sound since his "Baltimore warehouse days". Despite some of the criticism, Breihan described Experimental Rap to be an "overwhelming thing" and wrote that the samples were "crazy."

Whynow reviewer Elliot John was mixed on Experimental Rap, in which he called JPEGMafia "the most interesting rapper alive", followed by a statement that only twelve of 25 tracks on the album emphasize that. While John still saw the album as distinctive, he compared it unfavorably to All My Heroes Are Cornballs (2019), labeling Experimental Rap as more of a "brand" and a version of JPEGMafia that his fans expect. In his review for NME, Luke Morgan Britton summarized Experimental Rap as "a scattergun onslaught of disorientating hip-hop that rarely stops for a breather". He noted that JPEGMafia's flow sounded "surprisingly one-note" and concluded the review by stating that the artist's fans would not be surprised much while listening to the album.

Reviewing the album for Pitchfork, Dylan Green suggested that Experimental Rap represented JPEGMafia's "journey from a provocative firestarter to a fiercely bitter heel". Green felt that despite its title, the album lacked experimentation due to JPEGMafia's repetitive lyrics and triple-time flow, concluding that there were "few genuinely subversive ideas for it to live up to the earnestness of its title." Still Listening writer Alex Sinanidis considered Experimental Rap to be JPEGMafia's worst album, describing it as similar to the production of I Lay Down My Life for You but in a repetitive way. Sinanidis considered Experimental Rap to have been connected to a "disastrous PR campaign" that made JPEGMafia's persona more "egocentric" and "artificial."

== Track listing ==
All tracks are produced and written by Barrington "JPEGMafia" Hendricks unless otherwise noted.

Standard edition
No.	Title	Writer(s)	Producer(s)	Length
1.	"投影の芸術" (transl. "The Art of Projection")			0:57
2.	"Babygirl"			2:27
3.	"Burning Hammer"			3:14
4.	"$ (Money)"			2:15
5.	"Pop This Heat"	Hendricks; Billy Ray Schlag	JPEGMafia; Schlag	1:56
6.	"Meet the Dealers"	Hendricks; DatPiffMafia		2:42
7.	"Head"			1:43
8.	"Degenerates Prayer"			2:13
9.	"The Ghost of Emmett Till"			1:56
10.	"Since I Met Ye"			1:59
11.	"¥ (Yen)"			2:01
12.	"GYBB"			2:00
13.	"Tsar Bomba"			2:26
14.	"Mask On"			2:34
15.	"His Will"	Hendricks; Schlag	JPEGMafia; Schlag	1:07
16.	"Lights"	Hendricks; Alex Goldblatt		3:03
17.	"New Era"			2:27
18.	"One Day It Will Be Over"	Hendricks; Schlag	JPEGMafia; Schlag	0:44
19.	"War Over Land"			2:54
20.	"Bridges on Fire" (featuring Buzzy Lee)			2:53
21.	"No Strippers in Heaven"			2:32
22.	"內戰" (transl. "Civil War")			0:28
23.	"Chat"			3:07
24.	"The 1st Amendment"			1:21
25.	"You Will Always Lose Money Chasing Women, But You Will Never Lose Women Chasing Money"			1:59
Total length:				52:58

=== Notes ===
- "Babygirl" and "Head" are stylized in all lowercase.
- "Tsar Bomba" is stylized in all caps.
- "You Will Always Lose Money Chasing Women, But You Will Never Lose Women Chasing Money" is stylized in sentence case.
- "Tsar Bomba" was taken off of streaming services due to sample disputes.

=== Sample and interpolation credits ===
- "投影の芸術" contains a sample of dialogue from Paul Mooney.
- "Babygirl" contains a sample of "Tr(n)igger", written by Saul Williams and Trent Reznor and performed by Saul Williams.
- "Pop This Heat" contains a sample of "A Little Bit of Love", written and performed by Brenda Russell.
- "The Ghost of Emmett Till" contains a sample of "Shake Your Booty", written and performed by Bunny Sigler.
- "¥ (Yen)" contains a sample of "Money in the Bank", written by Darryl Richardson, David Brown and Isaac Hayes III, and performed by Lil Scrappy featuring Young Buck.
- "Since I Met Ye" and "Mask On" contain a sample of "Mr. Big", written by Premro Smith and Marlon Goodwin, and performed by 8Ball and MJG.
- "Tsar Bomba" contains an unauthorized sample of "Personality Collector", written by Isaac Rodriguez, Walker Wilson, Bryce Morris, Michael Locascio and Johnny Wynne, and performed by We Weren't Invited.
- "Lights" contains a sample of "All of the Lights", written by Kanye West, Jeff Bhasker, Scott Mescudi, Malik Yusef, Warren Trotter and Stacy Ferguson, and performed by West.

== Personnel ==
Credits are adapted from Tidal.

- Barrington Hendricks – vocals, mixing (all tracks)
- Dale Becker – mastering (tracks 1–12, 14–25)
