= Pol Taburet =

French contemporary artist (born 1997)

Pol Taburet (born 1997 in Paris) is a French contemporary artist known for figurative paintings that incorporate airbrushing techniques with traditional brush painting and incorporating Afro-Caribbean tropes into his practice. He graduated from École Nationale Supérieure d'Arts de Paris-Cergy.

== Biography ==
Pol Taburet attained degrees in fine arts at the bachelor's and graduate level at École Nationale Supérieure d'Arts de Paris-Cergy. His father is a psychoanalyst, and his mother worked as a museum guard at the Musée d'Art Moderne de Paris. His grandmother immigrated to France from Guadeloupe. Taburet remembers his parents reading literature, including Sufi poetry and Grimm's fairy tales, and a visit to the Musée du Luxembourg at age ten as inspirations to his profesisional engagement as a painter, recalling how "a [Giuseppe] Arcimboldo portrait was installed with a mirror below it, the effect was like a magic trick." Taburet's mother introduced him to Quimbois, the Guadeloupean form of Vodu, accents of which feature prominently in his practice.

Curator Ali Hassanzadeh met Taburet while he was bartending at nightclub NF-34 in Paris during his studies, helping to launch his career. Taburet subsequently exhibited work at Art Basel through galleries Balice Hertling and Mendes Wood DM. His first solo exhibition opened in September 2020 at Balice Hertling's Belleville space.

In 2022, Taburet won the Reiffers Art Initiatives Prize and was selected, among five other artists, for the 24th Prix Fondation Pernod Ricard. His work gained attention from curator Caroline Bourgeois and entered the collection of François Pinault. A 2025 profile in El País (ICON) described him as “the most precocious talent of the new French art scene.”

== Collections and Exhibitions ==
Taburet's work is held in the Pinault Collection, Lafayette Anticipations Collection, Homestead Collection, and KADIST Foundation. The Art Newspaper noted that "his works have already integrated the most prestigious private collections, from the Pinault Collection to the Kadist Foundation, from the Boros Collection to the Samdani Art Foundation," and in 2025 Taburet gained attention for displaying large bronze and cement sculptures at the 36th Bienal de São Paulo. His exhibition "OPERA III: ZOO 'The Day of Heaven and Hell'" at Lafayette Anticipations was his first institutional solo exhibition. The Fondación Sandretto Re Rebaudengo presented a solo exhibition curated by Hans Ulrich Obrist at the Pabellón de los Hexágonos in Madrid (2025). Beaux Arts Magazine described the Lafayette Anticipations exhibition noting that Taburet "transformed the Rem Koolhaas architecture into a domestic house, with windows, curtains and dining room. Except that, under the table, clawed paws protrude, and nightmarish visions are hung on the walls, adorned with storms and disturbing flashes."

== Artistic Practice ==
Taburet works with acrylic colors, alcohol-based paint, and oil paint, using airbrush techniques for faces and body parts to create "a misty, out-of-focus effect." He applies "bright colors with acrylic paint on the inert and the living is characterized by airbrush painting."

Taburet has previously stated, "The pointy-headed figures are at the core of my research. I construct a myth, a narrative around these characters." His subjects draw from "Caribbean mythology and beliefs, to the rich art history, or the ever-evolving landscape of contemporary culture such as animated cartoons, TV series, or music videos." Télérama noted his painting "plunging its roots in his Guadeloupean origins, evokes quimbois and voodoo cult as much as Francis Bacon, video games and avatars of social networks." The Art Newspaper described his approach as creating "the visible reliefs of an imaginary landscape" through "a contemporary rereading of Ovid's Metamorphoses and their series of intrigues, banishments, punishments and various transformations."

Taburet is represented by Galerie Balice Hertling (Paris) and Mendes Wood DM (São Paulo, Brussels, Paris, New York).
