= Redveil =

American rapper (born 2004)

redveil
- redveil at a show in 013 Tilburg

Background information
- Born: Marcus Morton; April 20, 2004 (age 22)
- Origin: Prince George's County, Maryland, U.S.
- Genres: East Coast hip hop; jazz rap
- Years active: 2016–present
- Website: redveil.com

Marcus Morton (born April 20, 2004), better known by his stage name Redveil (stylized as redveil), is an American rapper, songwriter, and record producer from Prince George's County, Maryland. He produces most of his own instrumentals, occasionally also making beats for other artists. He has self-released four albums, Bittersweet Cry, Niagara, Learn 2 Swim, and Sankofa, as well as one EP, Playing w/ Fire.

== Biography ==
=== Early life and influence ===
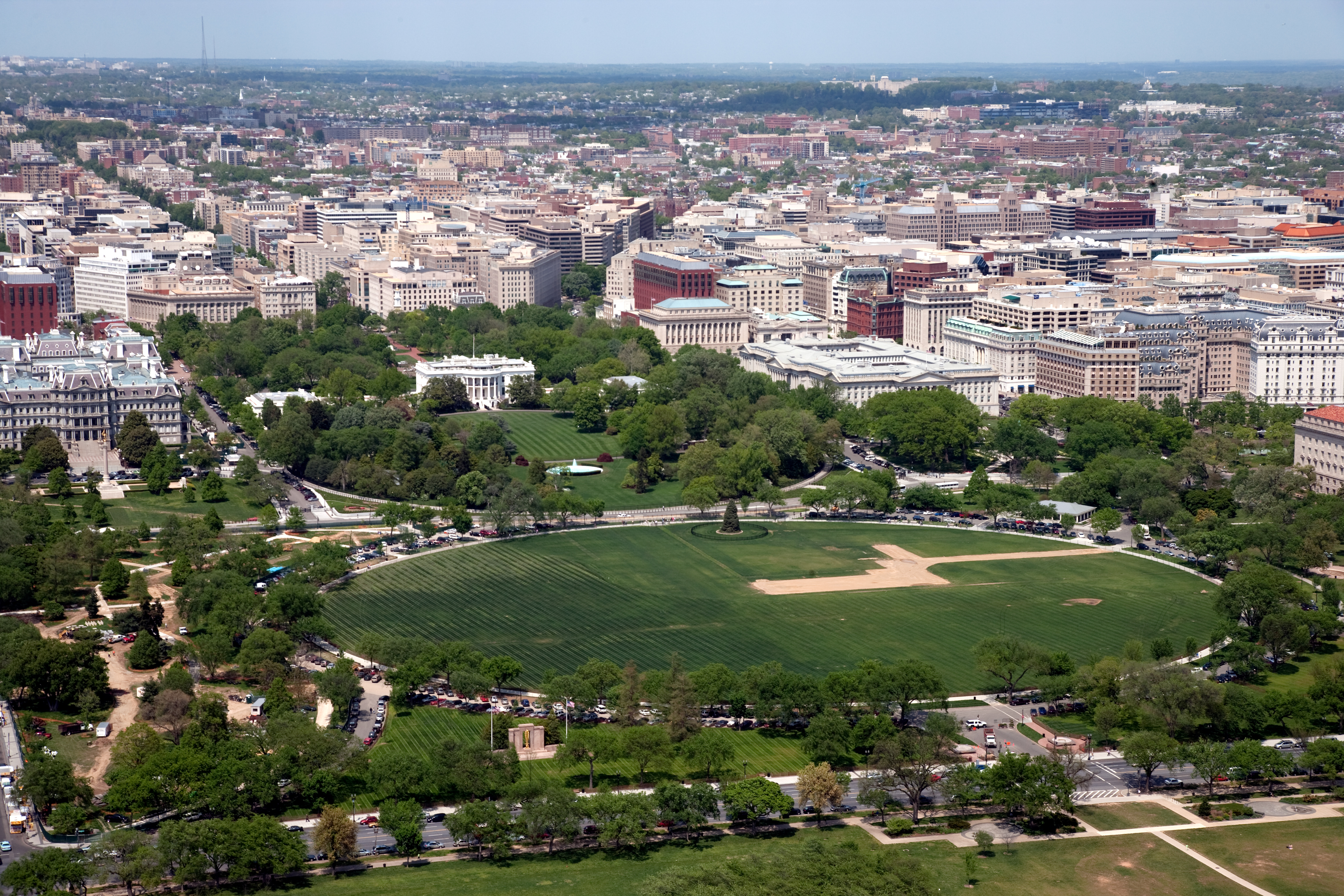
Redveil is from Prince George's County, Maryland, outside of Washington D.C.

Marcus Morton was born on April 20, 2004, to a Canadian-Jamaican mother and Kittian father. Growing up in Prince George's County, Maryland, Morton's parents would often play funk and soul music, which was an early influence to his sample choice, and his tone delivery. At age 11, Morton heard "Palace/Curse" by the Internet and Tyler, the Creator, which he credits as the "kickstart" to his musical interest. Shortly after, Redveil began producing his own music with FL Studio. Morton has described his music as "triumphant, bright and sunny."

While making his 2022 album Learn 2 Swim, Morton drew inspiration from New York drill music, and listened to local DMV area artists Xanman, Yung Manny, and No Savage during its creation.

=== Production ===
Redveil has production credits on all of his albums. His 2022 album, Learn 2 Swim, was entirely self-produced.

=== Critical reception and praise from other artists ===
A writer for online music publication Okayplayer called Morton "the DMV's next great hope" in an interview discussing his 2022 album, Learn 2 Swim. In 2020, another publication wrote: "[Redveil] is 16 rapping like he's in his 20s." Music publication Pitchfork gave Learn 2 Swim a score of 8.0 out of 10.

His song "Drown" featuring Donte Thomas and D'Mari Harris has been cosigned by Tyler, the Creator. The track also made his year-end list of favorite songs in 2020. Other notable artists who have cosigned Redveil include JID, Deante' Hitchcock, and Denzel Curry, whose 2022 world tour he supported at select dates. Redveil was also a supporting act at 12 shows during Freddie Gibbs' Space Rabbit Tour, where Mike also performed.

=== Political views ===
In November 2023, at Tyler, the Creator's Camp Flog Gnaw festival, Redveil called for a ceasefire in the Israeli bombardment of Gaza. He spoke about it during his performance while the names of recent victims scrolled on the screen behind him. In February 2024, he was featured on the Arabic news channel Al Jazeera Mubasher, where he spoke about the performance, further expressing his support for a ceasefire. In September 2025, Redveil joined the No Music For Genocide boycott to geo-block his music from music streaming platforms in Israel in protest of the Gaza genocide.

== Discography ==
=== Albums ===
Title	Album details
Bittersweet Cry	Released: December 6, 2019; Label: Self-released; Format: Digital download, streaming
Niagara	Released: August 25, 2020; Label: Self-released; Format: LP, Digital download, streaming
Learn 2 Swim	Released: April 20, 2022; Label: Self-released; Format: LP, Digital download, streaming
Sankofa	Released: December 4, 2025; Label: redveil LLC / Fashionably Early Records; Format: LP, Digital download, streaming

=== Extended plays ===
Title	Album details
Playing w/ Fire	Released: April 19, 2023; Label: Self-released; Format: Digital download, streaming

=== Singles ===
Title	Year
"Weekend" (featuring D'mari Harris)	2019
"Luck"	2019
"Bare Naked Hatred" (featuring Kira Corduroy)	2019
"How 2 find hope"	2020
"Raygun" (featuring Kenny Mason)	2020
"Traffic"	2020
"Soulfood"	2020
"Callback"	2020
"04"	2021
"2daside"	2022
"Better" (featuring Sam Truth)	2022
"Diving board"	2022
"Pg baby (Remix)" (featuring Denzel Curry)	2022
"Black Enuff" (featuring JPEGMafia)	2023
"Giftbag"	2023
"Lone star" (featuring Carolyn Malachi)	2025
"Mini me"	2025
"Brown sugar" (featuring Smino)	2025
"Square one"	2025

=== Features ===
List of notable features, with other performing artists, showing year released and album name
Title	Year	Artist(s)	Album
"Austin & Ally"	2020	Ka$hdami	16
"Truth"	2021	AG Club, Sam Truth	Fuck Your Expectations Pt. 1
"Enemies on My Side"	2021	Caleborate	Light Hit My Skin
"Used to Be"	2021	J-S.A.N.D.	It's Not Always About You
"Activate"	2021	Langston Bristol, Marlon Craft	—N/a
"Skydream"	2021	Shane Eagle, Monte Booker	Green
"Pace"	2021	Marlon Craft	Homecourt Advantage, Vol. 1
"ACAB"	2022	Supa Bwe, Dino 7K, Chance the Rapper	No Thanks
"Kingdom Hearts Key"	2023	JPEGMafia, Danny Brown	Scaring the Hoes
"Got 2 Give"	2023	Statik Selektah	Round Trip
"Bumpy Road"	2025	Rich Brian	"Where Is My Head?"

== Tours ==
=== Headlining ===
- Water 2 Fire Tour (2023)
- The Sankofa Tour (2026)

=== Supporting ===
- Freddie Gibbs - The Space Rabbit Tour (2022)
- Denzel Curry - Melt My Eyez See Your Future Tour (2022)
- Freddie Gibbs - The Last Rabbit Tour (2026)
- JPEGMAFIA - Experimental Rap Tour (2026)
