= Slauson Malone 1 =

American musician and singer (born 1995)

Background information
- Born: Jasper Marsalis; December 26, 1995 (age 30)
- Origin: Los Angeles, California, US
- Genres: Avant garde; alternative hip-hop; Hypnagogic pop
- Label: Warp Records
- Formerly of: Standing on the Corner, Medslaus

Jasper Armstrong Marsalis (born December 26, 1995), also known by his aliases Slauson Malone and Slauson Malone 1, is an American musician, singer, rapper, producer and visual artist. Formerly a member of the music collective Standing on the Corner, Marsalis made his debut as a solo artist under the Slauson Malone moniker in April 2019 with the album A Quiet Farewell, 2016–2018 (Crater Speak). He released his second album Excelsior as Slauson Malone 1 on October 6, 2023 through Warp Records.

== Early life ==
Marsalis was born on December 26, 1995, in Los Angeles, California. He comes from a prominent artistic and musical family; he is the son of jazz trumpeter Wynton Marsalis and actress Victoria Rowell, and grandson of jazz pianist and educator Ellis Marsalis Jr.

Growing up between Los Angeles and New York City, Marsalis studied visual art and earned a Bachelor of Fine Arts (BFA) from Cooper Union in Manhattan in 2017.

== Discography ==
=== Studio albums ===
==== Solo Albums ====
- A Quiet Farwell, 2016-2018 (Crater Speak) (2019)
- Excelsior (2023)

==== With Standing on the Corner ====
- Standing on the Corner (2016) – producer, performer.
- Red Burns (2017) – producer, performer, composer.

==== As Medslaus ====
- Poor Boy (2017)

=== Extended plays ===
==== Solo ====
- i went to los angeles to visit my mom (2016)
- Vergangenheitsbewältigung (Crater Speak) (2020)
- for Star (Crater Speak) (2022)

==== As Medslaus ====
- Greys in Yellow (2015)

=== Mixtapes ===
- 1 (2014)
- Radio Meditation (2026)

=== Singles ===
==== As Medslaus ====
- 4 Massappeal (2017)
- :+( [56 redux] (2019)

==== Solo ====
- 1123 featuring Medhane (2016)
- 402 featuring Medhane (2017)
- Closed Place, Open World (2018)
- Noid - Yves Tumor (2019)
- LEROY - por mi Valentine (2020)
- [NEW] leak 2020 (2020)
- Simile #7 (see page 127 and Ttrabul 2) (2020)
- Decades end 1010... (2022)
- b part v1 june 2022 (2022)
- Voyager (2023)
- New Joy (2023)
- Half-Life (2023)
- Porcelain (2026)
- IDKW2TU (2026)

=== Production credits ===
Production credits
Release	Year	Artist(s)	Details
Disguise the Limit	2016	Nyck Caution	Producer
Tower	2017	Caleb Giles	Producer
There Will Be Rain	2018	Caleb Giles	Guitar, writer, producer.
Ensley	2018	Pink Siifu	Guitar
Ba Suba	2018	Medhane	Producer
Laptop Raps	2018	Terror-wong	Producer
Decisions Ova Jerk Chicken	2018	Pink Siifu	Guitar
Under The Shade	2019	Caleb Giles	Writer, producer
Shine ft Blood Orange	2019	Danny Brown	Writer, producer
The Act	2019	Wiki	Producer
Own Place	2019	Medhane	Producer
Prone2	2020	Ọmọ Igi	Mixing assistant
Run Pig Run	2020	Pink Siifu	Producer
Fatigue	2021	L'rain	Producer
Grasp	2022	Nosaj Thing	Guitar, bass
Even God Has A Sense Of Humor	2023	Maxo	Bass
Great Doubt	2024	Astrid Sonne	Guitar
Fire Escape	2024	Zsela	Additional Producer
Staying Here (Je3's appendix edit)	2024	Astrid Sonne	Remixer
