= Black Lives Matter protests in New York City =

Anti-racism protests in New York City

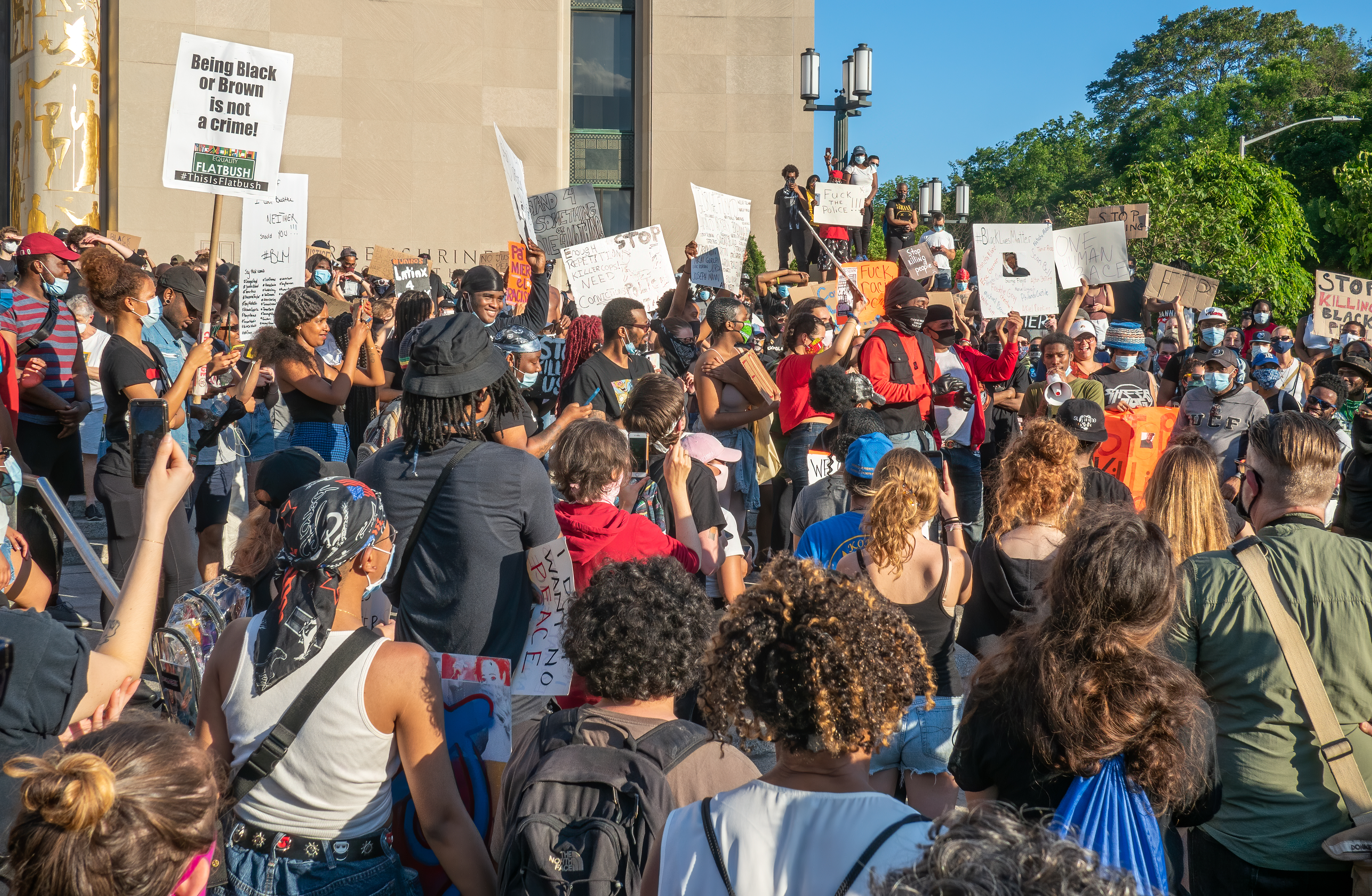
George Floyd protest in Grand Army Plaza in May 2020

New York City has been the site of many Black Lives Matter protests in response to incidents of police brutality and racially motivated violence against black people. The Black Lives Matter movement began as a hashtag after the shooting death of African-American teen Trayvon Martin, and became nationally recognized for street demonstrations following the 2014 deaths of two African Americans, Michael Brown and Eric Garner. Garner was killed in the Staten Island borough of New York City, leading to protests, demonstrations, and work towards changes in policing and the law. Following the murder of George Floyd in Minnesota in 2020, the global response included extensive protests in New York City, and several subsequent changes to policy.

== Background ==
The Black Lives Matter movement began in 2013 at the end of the trial of George Zimmerman for the shooting death of African-American teen Trayvon Martin. It began as a hashtag in response to the "not guilty" verdict, and soon after appeared on a banner in a protest march in California. A year later, the phrase and the movement surrounding it came to national attention following the shooting of Michael Brown in Ferguson, Missouri, and the killing of Eric Garner on Staten Island, New York.

There is a long history of civil unrest in New York City related to race and policing preceding the coalescing of Black Lives Matter, and the New York Police Department has been the subject of frequent criticism for its treatment of black citizens, including use of racial profiling, its stop-and-frisk program, and the use of mass arrests and other aggressive tactics against protesters. There have been several cases of controversial use of force which attracted national attention, such as the shootings of Clifford Glover, Sean Bell, Eleanor Bumpurs, Gidone Busch, Amadou Diallo, Ramarley Graham, and Timothy Stansbury.

== Protests ==
=== Eric Garner (2014) ===
On July 17, 2014, New York City Police Department (NYPD) officers approached Eric Garner on suspicion of selling single cigarettes without tax stamps. Garner denied selling cigarettes and told police he was tired of being harassed. Officers attempted to arrest Garner, and when Garner pulled his arms away, officer Daniel Pantaleo placed his arm around Garner's neck, using a prohibited chokehold, and wrestled him to the ground. As multiple police subdued him, Garner repeated the words "I can't breathe" 11 times while lying face down on the sidewalk. He eventually lost conscious and remained on the sidewalk for seven minutes while officers waiting for an ambulance. He was pronounced dead at a nearby hospital an hour later. The medical examiner ruled Garner's death a homicide resulting from "[compression] of neck, compression of chest and prone positioning during physical restraint by police." Video footage of the event circulated widely on social media and in news media.

The first public event protesting Garner's death was organized by Al Sharpton in Harlem. Joined by Garner's wife and mother, Sharpton condemned the actions of the officers involved and called for an investigation. At the Harlem event and at a protest in Staten Island the same day, he highlighted the use of a chokehold, which is not allowed by the NYPD, as well as the lack of response to a person repeatedly telling police that "I can't breathe". Sharpton also addressed attendees at Garner's funeral on July 23, calling for consequences for the officers involved. On July 29, WalkRunFly, a company formed by Tony Award winners Warren Adams and Brandon Victor Dixon, created a guerrilla theater event in Times Square whereby a flashmob led by actor Daniel J. Watts gathered outside NYPD Headquarters to give a protest performance. Sharpton led another march on August 23 on Staten Island, joined by an estimated 2,500 protesters.

On December 4, 2014, a grand jury decided not to indict Pantaleo, leading to public backlash, protests, and rallies in New York and nationally. The decision came less than two weeks after another grand jury in Missouri decided not to indict the officer who shot Michael Brown. Thousands protested the Pantaleo decision in New York City, chanting Garner's last words, "I can't breathe," which became a common rallying cry at Black Lives Matter events throughout the Eric Garner protests and other Black Lives Matter events over the years. Mayor Bill de Blasio gave a press conference explaining the importance of the phrase "Black Lives Matter" and describing how he had to talk to his son about possible dangers when engaging with police. A large protest gathered in Manhattan's Foley Square and crossed the Brooklyn Bridge while another started in Harlem. Groups blocked traffic on major thoroughfares like the West Side Highway. Overnight protests which began on the 4th led to more than 223 arrests, largely for disorderly conduct or refusal to clear the streets. More than 25,000 people convened in Manhattan on December 13 for Millions March NYC, starting at Washington Square Park and marching towards 34th Street. Families of unarmed black men killed by police led the march, including the families of Sean Bell and Ramarley Graham. The march later traveled over Brooklyn Bridge and later to police headquarters in Lower Manhattan, where there were conflicts between protesters and police.

=== Akai Gurley (2014–2016) ===
On November 20, 2014, two police officers were patrolling unlit stairwells in the Louis H. Pink Houses of East New York. One of them, officer Peter Liang, had his weapon drawn. When Akai Gurley and his girlfriend entered the stairwell beneath them, Liang fired his weapon. The bullet ricocheted off a wall and fatally struck Gurley in the chest. Liang was initially charged with manslaughter, which was reduced to criminally negligent homicide, resulting in probation and community service. In addition to Black Lives Matter protesters, upon the initial indictment of a Hong Kong American police officer, following a history of white police officers not being indicted, large numbers of Chinese-American demonstrators gathered to argue that Liang was a scapegoat for years of unpunished actions by white police. At several events, the Chinese-American protesters joined Black Lives Matter protesters, while at others the groups protested opposite each other. After Liang's sentencing in April 2016, protests flared again.

=== George Floyd (2020) ===
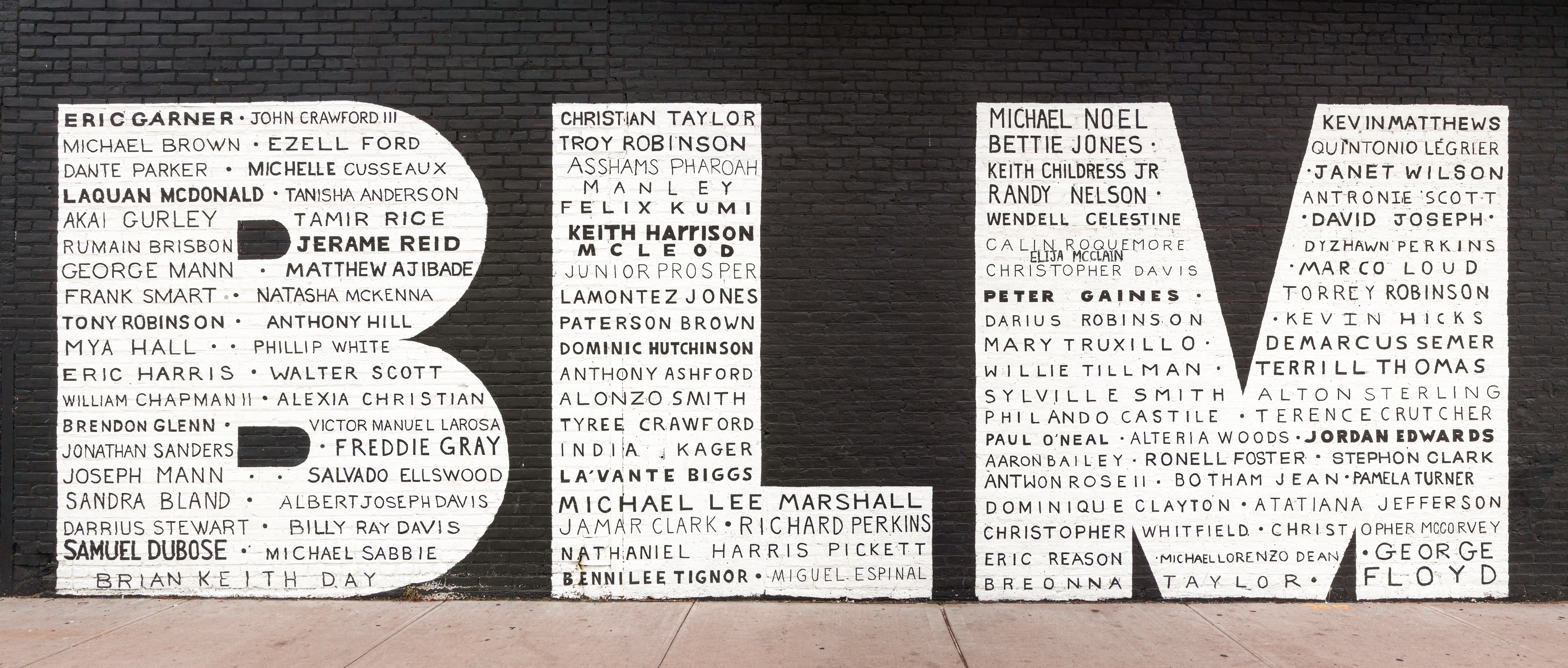
BLM mural in Greenpoint, Brooklyn with the names of some of the Black Americans killed by police

George Floyd was murdered on May 25, 2020, while being arrested for allegedly using a counterfeit bill in Minneapolis, Minnesota. As with the killing of Eric Garner, video of the event spread quickly through news and social media sparking international protests. In New York, the incident drew comparisons to Eric Garner, and demonstrations, protests, and marches occurred at several sites in each of the five New York City boroughs starting on May 28, 2020. Garner's mother, Gwen Carr, participated in several of the events. Most of the protests were peaceful, while some sites experienced protester and/or police violence. Looting became a parallel issue. As a result, and amid the COVID-19 pandemic, the city was placed under curfew for June 1 through June 7.

Amid the protests, there were several instances of excessive force used by police, such as an NYPD vehicle driving into a crowd on May 30, a viral video of an officer pulling down a protester's mask in order to pepper spray him, and the use of kettling and other aggressive policing after curfew. By June 7, a total of 1,126 arrests had been made during the protests, all but 39 of which were for non-violent offenses. Most arrests were made before a curfew was implemented, while afterwards 1,346 people were detained and given summonses for violating it rather than arrested.

The protests catalyzed efforts at police reform. New York City Councilman Rory Lancman first proposed a bill to criminalize chokeholds in 2014, after the killing of Eric Garner, but it was met with strong criticism from the powerful police unions and de Blasio threatened to veto it. In the wake of Floyd's murder, on June 8, City Council moved to pass the legislation, expanding the original ban to cover any action which "restricts the flow of air or blood by compressing the windpipe, diaphragm, or the carotid arteries" while making an arrest. The State Senate and Assembly also passed a bill on June 9 repealing 50-a, a controversial section of the New York Civil Rights Law which made it difficult to attain police personnel records, such as complaints and disciplinary record.

One of the demands made by protesters was to defund the NYPD, moving part of the budget to support communities in other ways, following years of responsibilities being added to the jobs of police. As the budget deadline approached, protesters convened in City Hall Park to "Occupy City Hall", filling the park day and night to call for reducing the NYPD budget. On June 30, City Council reduced the NYPD budget from $6 billion to $5 billion, canceling plans to hire new officers and shifting the responsibility to monitor vending, homeless populations, and schools to other entities. The City Hall occupation lasted for a little over three weeks, with the location acting as a hub for protestors meeting others, seeking emergency medical care, food and water, education, rest. The occupation was heavily surveilled by the NYPD and was the site of much police brutality.

=== Continued racial unrest (2020–2022) ===
The murder of George Floyd triggered broader civil unrest against systemic racism towards black people in the United States. It has involved protests, demonstrations, and marches as well as a cultural reckoning on topics of racial injustice generally.

On July 28, at a Black liberation march in Kips Bay, an 18 year old trans woman was apprehended by undercover warrant officers of the NYPD and placed in an unmarked gray police van, while bicycle officers held back the crowd. Cell phone video captured by protesters at the scene brought significant controversy on social media over the tactics used by law enforcement, with some making comparisons to use of federal forces in Portland, Oregon. The NYPD that evening stated in a series of tweets that the suspect was wanted in a connection of multiple instances of property damage to police cameras around the time protesters were engaged in Occupy City Hall and that during the arrest they were "assaulted with rocks and bottles". Following the incident, a group of protesters headed east to Madison Square Park, where two scuffles broke out between protesters and police, resulting in 12 arrests.

In August, a protester barricaded himself inside of his apartment in Hell's Kitchen as more than two dozen police officers attempted to make an arrest. The man was accused of assaulting an officer by yelling through a megaphone in a NYPD officer's ear from an incident on June 14. After live streaming attempts by officers to try to reach him, hundreds of protesters converged to the area to show support for the man, which resulted in police pulling out of the area by the early afternoon in order to avoid an escalation. The protester turned himself in the next day and was charged with a misdemeanor. A spokesperson for the district attorney's office defended the utilization of officers by the NYPD to arrest the protest founder. The NYPD later confirmed to the Gothamist of the use of facial recognition technologies in order to track down the suspect, which has been a continued subject of debate.

On August 24, 700 protesters marched from Times Square to Brooklyn to condemn the shooting of Jacob Blake and calling for further police reforms. Metal barriers were erected by the NYPD to prevent protesters from crossing the Brooklyn Bridge, however 300 protesters jumped them.

On September 4, several Daniel Prude demonstrators in Times Square sustained minor injuries after a sedan plowed through them and drove away. The NYPD investigated the matter and stated that the driver was not associated with the police, after initial rumors. The suspected driver had reportedly been seen at a counter-protest earlier that evening. The next day on September 5, NYPD identified the six suspects including one who is repeat vandal of the BLM mural in front of Trump Tower. The suspects claimed that they were in jeopardy. No injuries had been reported however an investigation was underway by the office of Keith Powers.

Following the 2020 United States presidential election on November 3, there were a series of several nights of post-election protests throughout the city in respond to claims by President Trump of electoral fraud; with peaceful protesters calling for the continued counting of every vote. 85 arrests had occurred by November 6.

On December 11, about 50 protesters marching against the custody of 9 undocumented immigrants by I.C.E. sponsored by Black Lives Matter in Murray Hill were injured following a vehicle driving through the crowd, resulting in six being hospitalized and the arrest of a 52-year-old woman who faced reckless endangerment charges.

Following the Storming of the United States Capitol on January 6, many New York officials including Jumaane Williams and Eric Adams drew contrasts to the response by law enforcement compared to the Summer of 2020, where there was a more aggressive response by police on Black Lives Matter demonstrators.

A Black Lives Matter march through Midtown Manhattan clashed with police on Sixth Avenue on February 12. Eleven people were arrested around Times Square, with two officers and a news reporter suffering injuries. The news reporter was a photographer for The Daily News, and was assaulted by a mob of 10 to 15 protesters.

== Street murals ==
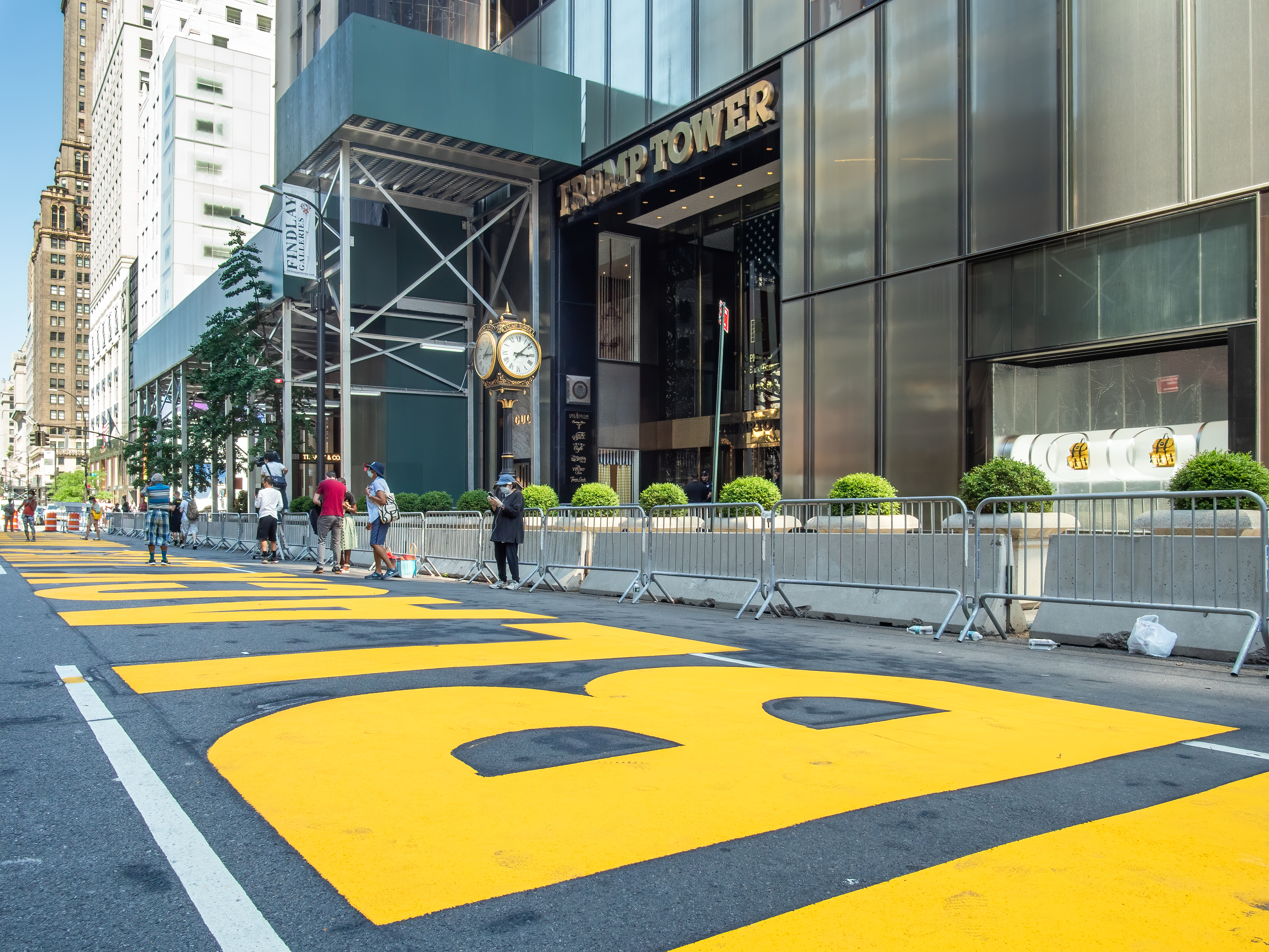
Trump Tower with Black Lives Matter mural painted in front in July 2020

In June 2020, a large mural was painted on Fulton Street in the Bedford-Stuyvesant neighborhood of Brooklyn, displaying the words "Black Lives Matter" in yellow letters and the names of people killed by racial violence like George Floyd. In July, New York elected officials painted another similar mural on 5th Avenue in Manhattan, directly in front of Trump Tower. The president expressed his opposition to the mural after it was announced. In the weeks after it was painted, the mural was repeatedly vandalized and repainted.
