= Killing of Eric Garner =

2014 police killing of a black man in New York City

- A frame from the video of Garner tackled by police
- Date: July 17, 2014; 12 years ago
- Time: c. 3:30–3:45 p.m. (EDT)
- Location: 202 Bay Street, Staten Island, New York, U.S.; 40.63716°N 74.07674°W
- Type: Homicide by suffocation, police killing
- Participants: Daniel Pantaleo and Justin D'Amico (NYPD officers)
- Outcome: Pantaleo fired in August 2019
- Deaths: Eric Garner
- Charges: None
- Litigation: $5.9 million out-of-court settlement

On July 17, 2014, Eric Garner, a 43-year-old African American man, was killed in the New York City borough of Staten Island by Daniel Pantaleo, a New York City Police Department (NYPD) officer, after putting him in a prohibited chokehold while arresting him. Video footage of the incident generated widespread national attention and raised questions about the use of force by law enforcement.

NYPD officers approached Garner on July 17 on suspicion of selling single cigarettes from packs without tax stamps. After Garner told the police that he was tired of being harassed and that he was not selling cigarettes, the officers attempted to arrest Garner. When Pantaleo placed his hands on Garner, Garner pulled his arms away. Pantaleo then placed his arm around Garner's neck and wrestled him to the ground. With multiple officers pinning him down, Garner repeated the words "I can't breathe" 11 times while lying face down on the sidewalk. After Garner lost consciousness, he remained lying on the sidewalk for seven minutes while the officers waited for an ambulance to arrive. Garner was pronounced dead at a hospital approximately one hour later.

The medical examiner ruled Eric Garner's death a homicide. Specifically, an autopsy indicated that Garner's death resulted from "[compression] of neck, compression of chest and prone positioning during physical restraint by police". Asthma, heart disease, and obesity were cited as contributing factors.

On December 4, 2014, a Richmond County grand jury decided not to indict Pantaleo. This decision led to protests and rallies, with charges of police brutality made by protesters. By December 28, 2014, at least 50 demonstrations had been held nationwide in response to the Garner case, while hundreds of demonstrations against general police brutality counted Garner as a focal point. On July 13, 2015, an out-of-court settlement was reached, under which the City of New York would pay the Garner family $5.9 million. In 2019, the U.S. Department of Justice declined to bring criminal charges against Pantaleo under federal civil rights laws. On August 2, 2019, at a New York Police Department disciplinary hearing regarding Pantaleo's treatment of Garner, an administrative judge, NYPD Deputy Commissioner of Trials Rosemarie Maldonado, recommended that Pantaleo's employment be terminated. Pantaleo was fired on August 19, 2019, more than five years after Garner's death.

== People involved ==
=== Eric Garner ===
Eric Bernard Garner (September 15, 1970 – July 17, 2014) was a 43-year-old African American man. He was a horticulturist at the New York City Department of Parks and Recreation before quitting for health reasons. Garner, who was married to Esaw Garner, was described by his friends as a "neighborhood peacemaker" and a generous, congenial person. At the time of his death, he was the father of six children, including a then-3-month-old child, and had three grandchildren.

Garner had been arrested by the NYPD more than 30 times since 1980 on charges such as assault, resisting arrest, and grand larceny. According to an article in The New York Times, many of these arrests had been for allegedly selling unlicensed cigarettes. In 2007, he filed a handwritten complaint in federal court accusing a police officer of conducting a cavity search of him on the street, "digging his fingers in my rectum in the middle of the street" while people passed by. Garner had, according to The New York Times, "recently ... told lawyers at Legal Aid that he intended to take all the cases against him to trial". At the time of the incident, he was out on bail for allegedly selling untaxed cigarettes, driving without a license, marijuana possession, and false personation.

=== Daniel Pantaleo ===
At the time of Eric Garner's death, Daniel Pantaleo was a 29-year-old New York City Police Department officer living in Eltingville, Staten Island. He joined the NYPD in 2006 after graduating from Monsignor Farrell High School, and with a bachelor's degree from the College of Staten Island. Pantaleo was the subject of two civil rights lawsuits in 2013 where plaintiffs accused him of falsely arresting them and abusing them. In one of the cases, he and other officers allegedly ordered two black men to strip naked on the street for a search and the charges against the men were dismissed.

=== Ramsey Orta ===
Ramsey Orta is a New York City man who filmed the incident. Following a campaign of alleged police harassment after the video went viral, he was arrested on weapons charges. Al Sharpton made a statement that prosecuting Orta while also calling him as a witness in the Garner case could constitute a conflict of interest.

In February 2015, Orta was incarcerated on Rikers Island. In March 2015, a lockdown was initiated, and he was not permitted to prepare his own food. The prisoners were served meatloaf by the prison officers. After falling ill multiple times after eating food on Rikers, Orta believed he had been deliberately poisoned. He described that the other prisoners fell ill, vomiting blood, but the guards reportedly laughed, and no prisoners were taken to the infirmary. Court documents stated that the prisoners had suffered from various ailments after eating the food. Blue-green pellets were found in the meatloaf, and determined to be brodifacoum, the main ingredient of rat poison. As a result, Orta stopped eating the food, only taking food passed to him from his visiting wife. He has alleged that prison officers booked him on false or trivial offenses in a biased manner, resulting in him not being able to receive food from his wife. Orta also claimed that the prison officers have threatened, insulted, and beaten him, and deliberately crushed the food from his wife. Orta stated that when he was initially arrested, a police officer told him it would be better for Orta to kill himself before he was jailed.

After prosecutors questioned whether the money raised for his bail was crowdsourced legally, Orta was released on bail on April 10, 2015.

In 2016, he was sentenced to four years in prison for weapons and drug charges after accepting a plea deal for which the prosecutor agreed to drop charges against his mother. In May 2020, he was released from Groveland Correctional Facility, a release in relation to the COVID-19 pandemic.

== Events of July 17, 2014 ==
External videos
- Full video (14:43) on YouTube – recorded by Ramsey Orta and acquired by the Daily News

On July 17, 2014, at approximately 3:30 p.m., Garner was approached by a plainclothes police officer, Justin D'Amico, in front of a beauty supply store at 202 Bay Street in Tompkinsville, Staten Island. According to bystanders (including a friend of Garner, Ramsey Orta, who recorded the incident on his cell phone), Garner had just broken up a fight, which may have drawn the attention of the police. Officers confronted Garner and accused him of selling "loosies" (single cigarettes without a tax stamp) in violation of New York state law. Garner is heard on the video saying the following:

Get away [garbled] for what? Every time you see me, you want to mess with me. I'm tired of it. It stops today. Why would you...? Everyone standing here will tell you I didn't do nothing. I did not sell nothing. Because every time you see me, you want to harass me. You want to stop me [garbled] selling cigarettes. I'm minding my business, officer, I'm minding my business. Please just leave me alone. I told you the last time, please just leave me alone.

When Pantaleo approached Garner from behind and attempted to handcuff him, Garner pulled his arms away, saying, "Don't touch me, please." Pantaleo then placed his arm around Garner's neck and pulled him backward in an attempt to take him to the ground; in the process, Pantaleo and Garner slammed into a glass window, which did not break. Garner went to his knees and forearms and did not say anything for a few seconds. At that point, three uniformed officers and the two plainclothes officers had surrounded him. After 15 seconds, the video shows Pantaleo removing his arm from around Garner's neck; Pantaleo then used his hands to push Garner's face into the sidewalk while pinning him down. Garner said "I can't breathe" eleven times while lying face down on the sidewalk. The arrest was supervised by a female African-American NYPD sergeant, Kizzy Adonis, who did not intercede. Adonis was quoted in the original police report as stating, "The perpetrator's condition did not seem serious and he did not appear to get worse."

A police sergeant called an ambulance and indicated that Garner was having trouble breathing, but reportedly added that he "did not appear to be in great distress". Garner lay motionless, handcuffed, and unresponsive for several minutes before an ambulance arrived, as shown in a second video. After Garner lost consciousness, officers turned him onto his side to ease his breathing. Garner remained lying on the sidewalk for seven minutes. When an ambulance arrived, EMTs checked his pulse but did little else for about two minutes before lifting him onto a stretcher. According to police, Garner had a heart attack while being transported to Richmond University Medical Center. He was pronounced dead at the hospital one hour later.

A funeral was held for Garner on July 23, 2014, at Bethel Baptist Church in Brooklyn. At the funeral, Al Sharpton gave a speech calling for harsher punitive measures to be taken against the officers responsible for the incident.

== Immediate aftermath ==
On July 20, Pantaleo was put on desk duty and stripped of his service handgun and badge. Justin D'Amico was allowed to keep his badge and handgun, but was also placed on desk duty. Four of the EMTs and paramedics who took Garner to the hospital were suspended on July 21. Two of the paramedics were soon returned to their duties, and the remaining two EMTs were doing non-medical work at the hospital pending the Richmond University Medical Center's own investigation into the incident.

=== Medical examiner's report and autopsy ===
On August 1, 2014, the New York City Medical Examiner's Office ruled Garner's death a homicide. According to the medical examiner's definition, a homicide is a death caused by the intentional actions of another person or persons, which is not necessarily an intentional death or a criminal death.

Garner's death was also found by the medical examiner to have resulted from "compression of neck (choke hold), compression of chest and prone positioning during physical restraint by police". Asthma and heart disease were cited as contributing factors. Prior to that, on July 19, 2014, The New York Post published a report, citing unnamed sources, claiming the medical examiner had found no damage to Garner's "windpipe or neckbones" during a preliminary autopsy.

Garner's family hired Michael Baden, a former New York City medical examiner, to perform an independent autopsy. Baden agreed with the findings of the Medical Examiner's Office and concluded that Garner's death was primarily caused by "compression of the neck". Baden reported finding hemorrhaging around Garner's neck, which was indicative of neck compression.

Pantaleo's union, the Patrolmen's Benevolent Association, noted that Garner's hyoid bone was not fractured. Barbara Sampson, the New York City medical examiner, said that "It is false that crushing of the windpipe and fracture of the hyoid bone would necessarily be seen at autopsy as the result of a chokehold."

=== Protests ===
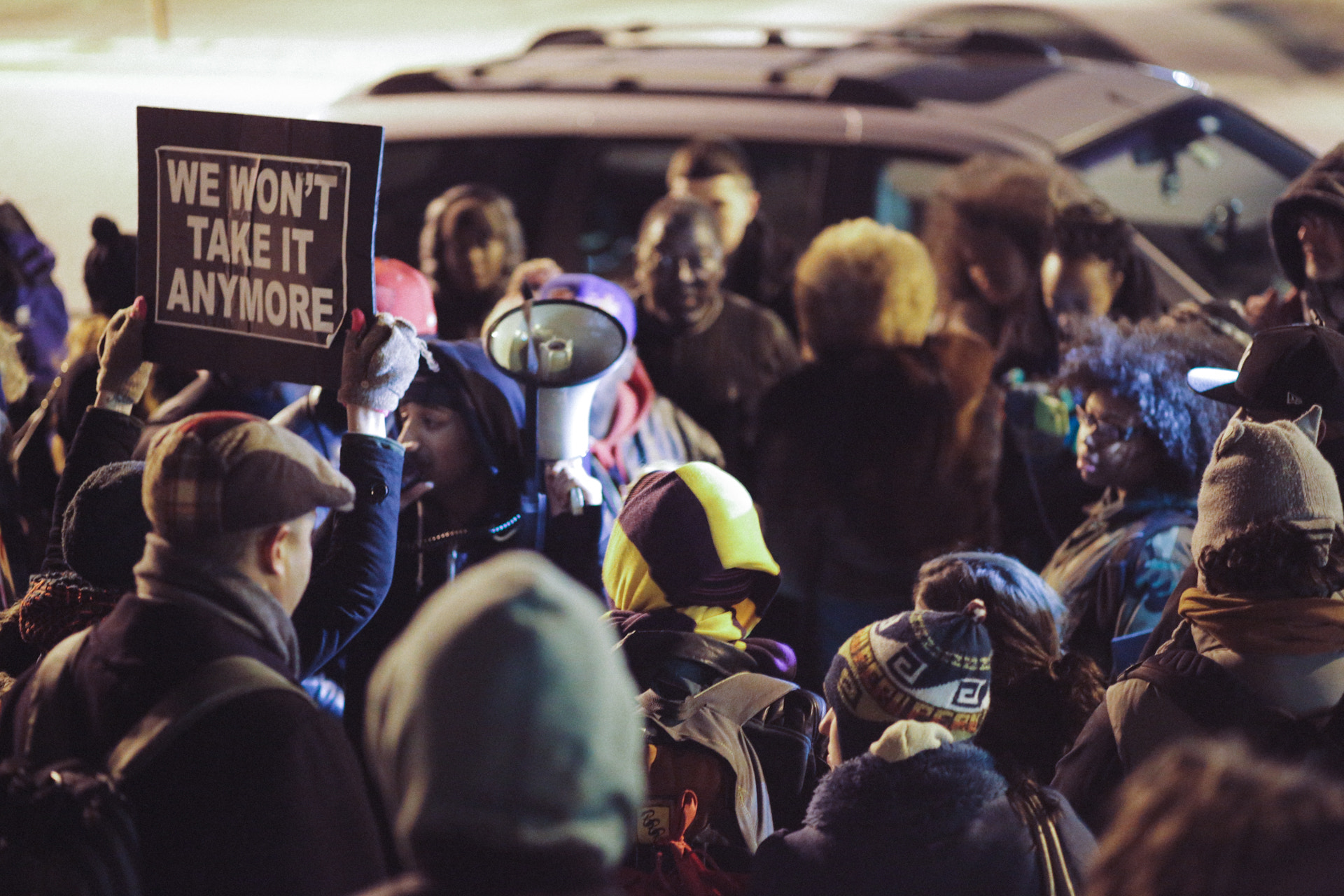
Protests in Tompkinsville

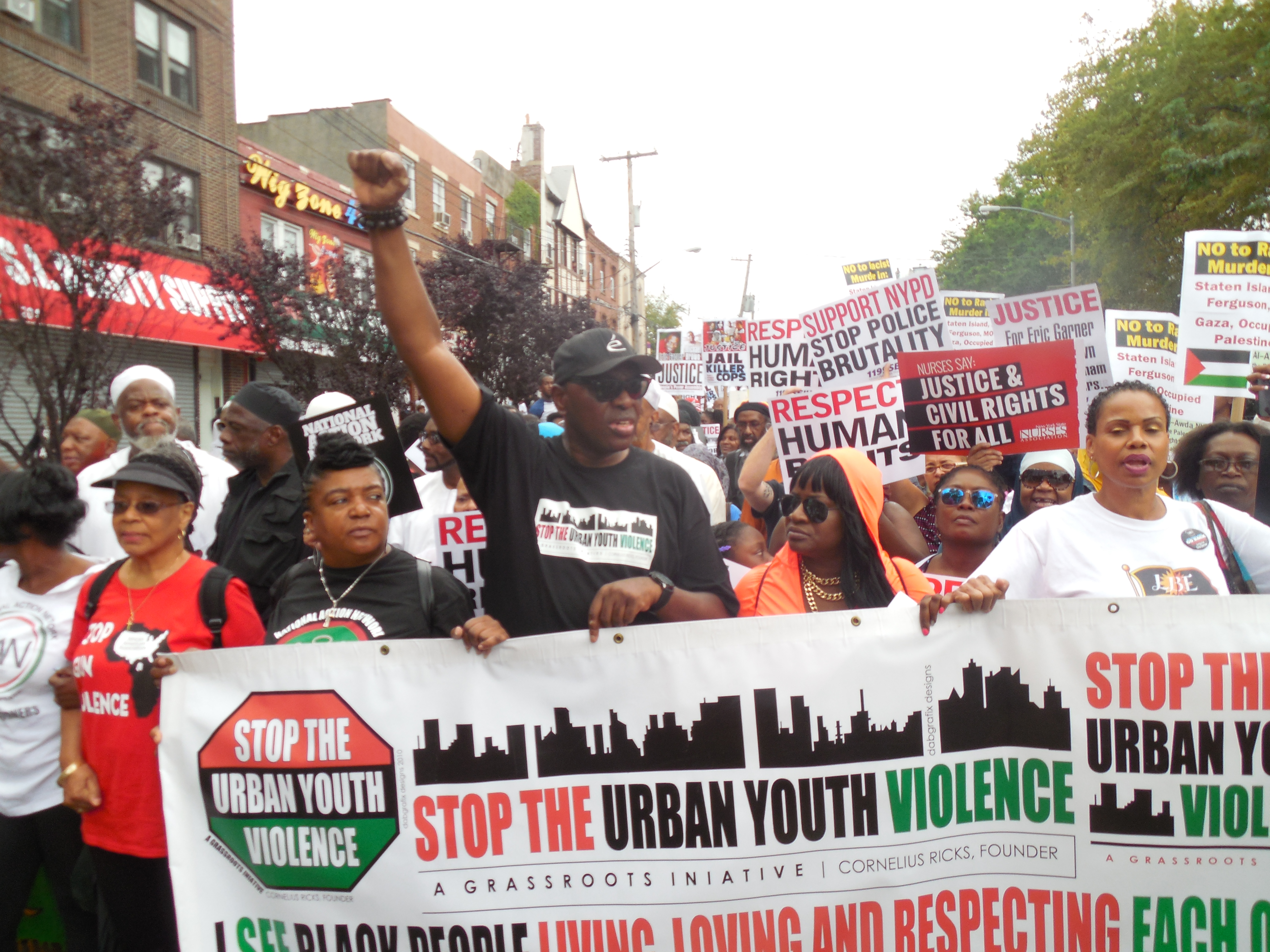
Protest rally in Tompkinsville

Sharpton organized a protest in Staten Island on the afternoon of July 19; he condemned the use of a chokehold on Garner, saying that "there is no justification" for it.

On July 28, a protest organized by WalkRunFly Productions and poet Daniel J. Watts was held in Times Square. The protest was in the form of poetry and many Broadway entertainers participated in the event. Al Sharpton originally planned to lead a protest on August 23 in which participants would drive over the Verrazzano–Narrows Bridge, then travel to the site of the altercation and the office of District Attorney Daniel M. Donovan, Jr. This idea was scrapped in favor of Sharpton's leading a march along Bay Street in Staten Island, where Garner died; police estimated that over 2,500 people participated in the march.

In March 2015, Assata's Daughters, a Chicago-based black activist group, formed because they saw a lack of response by public officials to Eric Garner's death.

== Grand jury ==
=== Grand jury deliberation ===
On August 19, Richmond County (Staten Island) District Attorney Daniel M. Donovan, Jr. brought evidence against Pantaleo to a grand jury, saying that after considering the medical examiner's findings, his office decided "it is appropriate to present evidence regarding circumstances of his death to a Richmond County Grand Jury." On September 29, the grand jury began hearing evidence in the Garner case. On November 21, Pantaleo testified before the grand jury for about two hours. After considering the case for two months, the grand jury decided on December 3 not to indict Pantaleo.

Under New York law, most of the grand jury proceedings were kept secret, including the exact charges sought by the prosecutor, the autopsy report, and transcripts of testimony. Attempts by the New York Civil Liberties Union and others to gain release of that information have been unsuccessful.

=== Reaction ===
==== Public ====
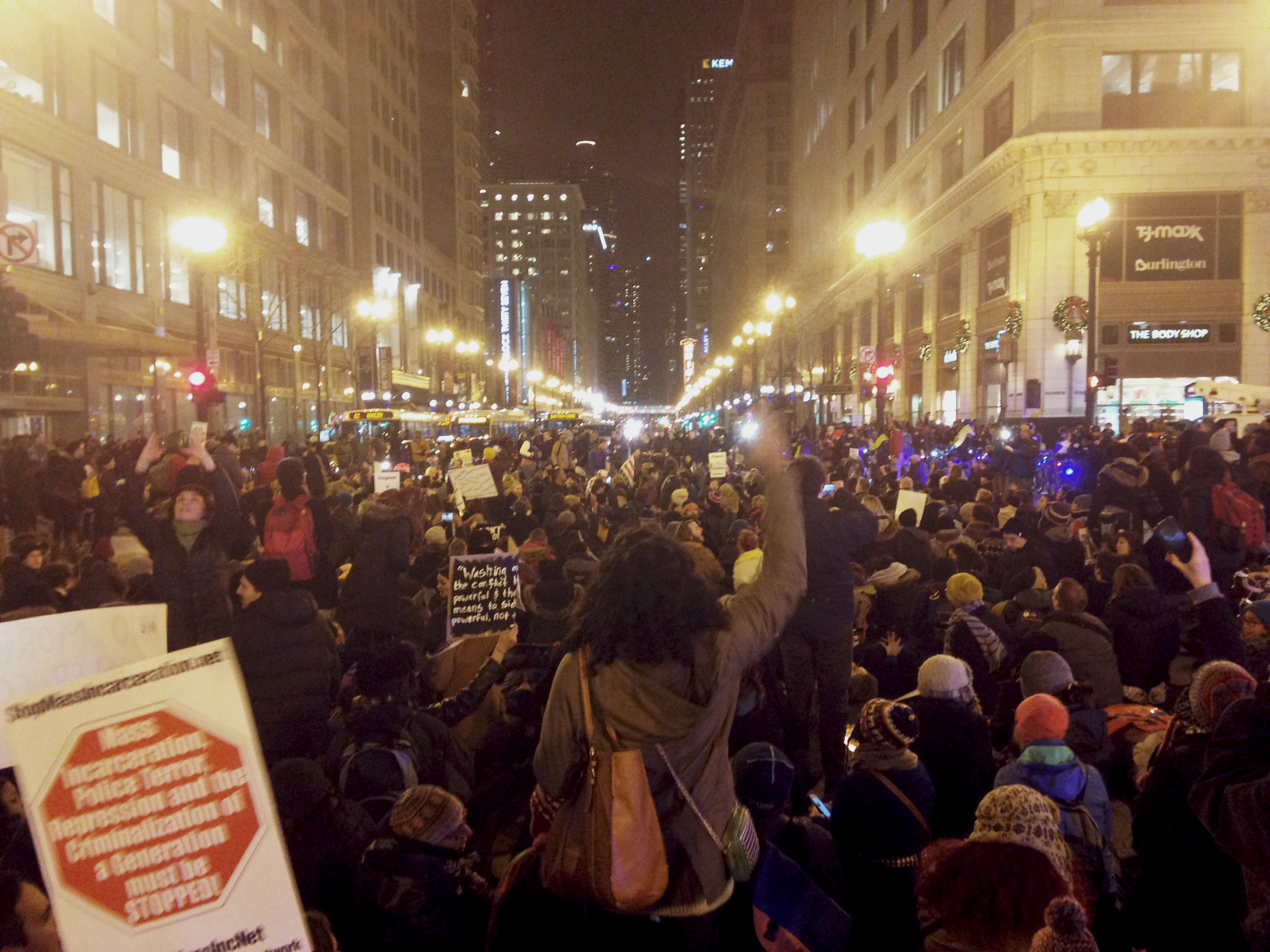
Chicago protesters protesting the Staten Island grand jury's decision, December 4, 2014

After the Staten Island grand jury did not indict Pantaleo on December 3, citizens in New York City and San Francisco gathered in protest, demonstrating with several die-ins, making speeches and rallies against the lack of indictment. On December 5, thousands gathered in protest on the Boston Common in Boston, and then marched in the downtown area, blocking traffic, especially on I-90, in addition to staging "die-ins." Protests also occurred in Chicago, Washington, D.C., Baltimore, Minneapolis, and Atlanta. At least 300 people were arrested at the New York City protests on December 4 and 5, most of them for charges of disorderly conduct or refusal to clear the streets, but two for assault on a police officer. On December 6, 300 protesters marched in Berkeley, California as well. On December 10, 76 protesters were arrested at Westfield shopping centre in Shepherd's Bush in west London, England, during a rally to show solidarity with rallies in the United States. Protesters have made use of Garner's last words, "I can't breathe", as a slogan and chant against police brutality since Garner's death and Pantaleo's grand jury decision. By December 28, at least 50 protests in support of Garner had occurred globally, and many other Black Lives Matter-related demonstrations had occurred.

Counter-protests were also launched in support of police, specifically for the NYPD. On December 19, during a New York City protest about the grand jury decision, supporters of the NYPD held a counter-demonstration, wearing shirts with the phrase, "I can breathe, thanks to the NYPD", on them, holding signs with phrases like "Bluelivesmatter", and chanting, "Don't resist arrest."

On December 20, two NYPD officers were killed in an ambush in Bedford–Stuyvesant, Brooklyn. The suspected gunman, Ismaaiyl Brinsley, cited Garner's death at the hands of police (as well as that of Michael Brown) as reasons to kill police officers. Brinsley then entered the New York City Subway and committed suicide.

Garner's death has been cited as one of several police killings of African Americans protested by the Black Lives Matter movement.

==== Police ====
As a result of Garner's death, Police Commissioner William Bratton ordered an extensive review of the NYPD's training procedures, specifically focusing on the appropriate amount of force that can be used while detaining a suspect. Patrick Lynch, leader of the police union Patrolmen's Benevolent Association, challenged the claim that a chokehold was used, further stating that the union would be able to find many use-of-force experts who would also challenge the claim that a chokehold was used. Lynch also attributed Garner's death to resisting arrest and, "a lack of the respect for law enforcement, resulting from the slanderous, insulting, and unjust manner in which police officers are being portrayed." Edward D. Mullins, the head of the union representing police sergeants, called on members to slow down police response across the city by supervising every arrest. He also commented saying that the use of the term "chokehold" by the chief medical examiner's office was political. Police union officials and Pantaleo's lawyer argued that Pantaleo did not use the chokehold, but instead used a NYPD-taught takedown move because Garner was resisting arrest. Police also defended the decision not to perform CPR on Garner on the grounds that he was still breathing on his own.

An Indiana police officer sold T-shirts saying "Breathe Easy. Don't Break the Law." A veteran San Jose Police Officer, Phillip White, tweeted: "Threaten me or my family and I will use my God given and law appointed right and duty to kill you. #CopsLivesMatter", which sparked controversy.

==== Family ====
In an interview with CNN, Garner's daughter Erica felt that it was pride and not racism that led to the officer choking her father. Erica held a vigil and "die-in" on December 11, 2014, on Staten Island in memory of her father, near where he died. On her Twitter account, she vowed to continue to lead protests in Staten Island twice a week, lying down in the spot where her father collapsed and died. Erica Garner died on December 30, 2017, after suffering a heart attack at the age of 27.

One of Garner's daughters, Emerald Snipes, created a fund for his kids for Christmas, as Garner used to play Santa Claus. Garner's daughters Erica and Emerald, his widow Esaw, and his stepfather Ben Carr all went to the Justice for All March in Washington, D.C.

After the grand jury decision, when asked whether she accepted Pantaleo's condolences, Garner's widow angrily answered, "Hell, no! The time for remorse would have been when my husband was yelling to breathe." She added, "No, I don't accept his apology. No, I could care less about his condolences ... He's still working. He's still getting a paycheck. He's still feeding his kids, when my husband is six feet under and I'm looking for a way to feed my kids now."

Garner's mother, Gwen Carr, expressed surprise and disappointment at the grand jury decision.

==== Politicians ====
New York City Mayor Bill de Blasio called Garner's death a "terrible tragedy." De Blasio, at a July 31 roundtable meeting in response to the death, convened with police officers and political activists, called upon mutual respect and understanding. On August 1, in a statement, the mayor urged all parties involved to create a dialogue, and find a path "to heal the wounds from decades of mistrust and create a culture where the police department and the communities they protect respect each other." Mayor de Blasio has been criticized by activists for not firing the officers involved in Garner's death.

New York Governor Andrew Cuomo said that New York State should consider appointing a special prosecutor to handle cases of alleged police brutality. He told CNN: "We have a problem. Let's acknowledge it."

U.S. Attorney General Eric Holder said that the Department of Justice was "closely monitoring" investigations into Garner's death.

Two U.S. Presidents have expressed thoughts about Garner's death. Barack Obama addressed the grand jury's decision by making a speech, stating that Garner's death and the legal outcome of it is an "American problem". Obama also reacted by saying that Garner's death "speaks to the larger issues" of trust between police and civilians. Former U.S. President George W. Bush said he found the grand jury outcome "hard to understand" and "very sad" in an interview.

Rep. Peter King (R-NY) stated that, if Garner had been healthier, he would not have died after a police officer placed him in a chokehold. "If he had not had asthma, and a heart condition, and was so obese, almost definitely he would not have died from this." King added that there "was not a hint" that anyone used any racial epithets, and that if Garner were a "350-pound white guy, he would have been treated the same."

==== Celebrities ====
Shady Records recording artist Kxng Crooked aka Crooked I of Slaughterhouse recorded a tribute song for Garner titled "I Can't Breathe". The song was released exclusively through MTV News. Crooked used the same instrumental that was used for 2Pac's "Pain", with additional production added by Jonathan Hay. The cover art features an image of Garner being held in a chokehold by law enforcement officials.

After the grand jury declined to indict Pantaleo, professional athletes such as NFL players Reggie Bush, Ryan Davis, Cecil Shorts III, Marqise Lee, Ace Sanders, and Allen Hurns; and NBA players LeBron James, Kobe Bryant and the Los Angeles Lakers, Kyrie Irving, Kevin Garnett, Derrick Rose, Jarrett Jack, and Deron Williams, wore T-shirts bearing the phrase "I can't breathe" during pregame warmups. The Phoenix Suns also wore the shirts. President Obama and Attorney General Holder applauded James for wearing the shirt.

The Georgetown University men's basketball team wore "I can't breathe" shirts, as did the University of Notre Dame women's basketball team.

Realizing that Garner died the same way as Radio Raheem, a character from the film Do the Right Thing, film director Spike Lee also paid tribute to Garner by splicing footage of Garner's death with a clip from the film showing several police officers putting the character in a chokehold.

The title of Terence Blanchard's 2015 album Breathless was inspired by Garner's last words ("I can't breathe").

Matt Taibbi wrote the 2017 book I Can't Breathe: A Killing on Bay Street.

== Civil lawsuit ==
In October 2014, Garner's family stated their intent to file a wrongful death lawsuit against the City of New York, the police department, and several police officers, seeking $75 million in damages. The parties reached a $5.9 million out-of-court settlement on July 13, 2015. Garner's widow had previously rejected a $5 million settlement offer.

== Department of Justice investigation ==
On December 3, 2014, after the grand jury decided not to indict Pantaleo, the Department of Justice started an independent investigation. In January 2015 it was reported that the FBI's New York Field Office was reviewing the incident and events thereafter. The investigation was overseen by local United States Attorney Loretta Lynch until she became the US Attorney General. The local FBI investigators and federal prosecutors determined that charges should not be brought in the case, prompting strong disagreement from attorneys in the Washington, D.C. office of the United States Department of Justice Civil Rights Division. In October 2016, Attorney General Lynch removed the local FBI agents and federal prosecutors from the case, replacing them with agents from outside New York. Lynch's intervention has been called "highly unusual".

In 2017, ThinkProgress obtained anonymously and published Pantaleo's police department disciplinary records, showing that Pantaleo had "seven disciplinary complaints and 14 individual allegations lodged against him. Four of those allegations were substantiated by an independent review board." He was found guilty of one of those fourteen allegations, and was disciplined by the loss of two vacation days.

On July 16, 2019, Attorney General William Barr decided that the officers involved in Garner's death would not face federal charges.

== Disciplinary hearing and termination of Pantaleo ==
An internal affairs inquiry by the NYPD determined that Pantaleo used a chokehold and recommended disciplinary charges. Chokeholds are prohibited by NYPD regulations. In 2015, the Department of Justice asked the NYPD to delay pursuing disciplinary charges pending a federal investigation. On July 16, 2018, NYPD Deputy Commissioner Lawrence Byrne wrote a letter to the Justice Department stating that the NYPD would pursue disciplinary actions against officers involved in Garner's death if the Justice Department did not file charges by the end of August.

During an April 4, 2019, disciplinary hearing Pantaleo's attorneys argued that in an internal report dated December 10, 2014, NYPD Chief Surgeon Eli Kleinman concluded Pantaleo did not use a chokehold on Garner and Garner had suffered no chokehold associated injuries. According to Pantaleo's lawyer, Kleinman found that Garner's pre-existing health conditions contributed to his death. The report was completed at the request of NYPD Internal Affairs Bureau. Kleinman did not personally examine Garner and based his conclusions on a review of two videos of the incident and Garner's autopsy.

At a May 2019 disciplinary hearing for Pantaleo, Dr. Floriana Persechino, who performed Garner's autopsy, testified that Pantaleo's use of a chokehold on Garner "set into motion a lethal sequence" that led to a fatal asthma attack. However, the examiner conceded that even "a bear hug" could have had the same effect as the chokehold, given that Garner weighed 395 pounds (179 kg), suffered from asthma and diabetes, and had a heart twice the size of a healthy person's heart. Moreover, during the trial at a hearing in June 2019, a defense witness, Dr. Michael Graham, St. Louis, Missouri's chief medical examiner, testified Garner's death could not have been caused by a chokehold because, Graham said, Garner was never actually choked or unable to breathe during the arrest. Graham attributed Garner's death to heart disease exacerbated by the stress of the arrest.

During this same trial, Pantaleo's partner, Justin D'Amico, admitted that he exaggerated Garner's charges. D'Amico claimed Garner had been selling 10,000 untaxed cigarettes, which was a felony. However, Garner had fewer than 100 cigarettes in his possession at the time of his death.

Pantaleo's disciplinary hearing concluded on June 6, 2019. Two months later, it was reported that the administrative judge presiding over the disciplinary hearing recommended to New York Police Department Commissioner James O'Neill that Pantaleo be fired. According to New York Police Department Administrative Judge Rosemarie Maldonado, video evidence and autopsy results provided "'overwhelming'" evidence that Pantaleo had placed Garner in a chokehold. In her recommendation to the Commissioner, Judge Maldonado found that Pantaleo's "'use of a chokehold fell so far short of objective reasonableness that this tribunal found it to be reckless — a gross deviation from the standard of conduct established for a New York City police officer.'"

On August 19, 2019, O'Neill terminated Pantaleo's employment with the New York Police Department, stating that it would not be possible for Pantaleo to serve effectively, and that Pantaleo's decision to maintain the chokehold on the ground is what led to his firing. Pantaleo subsequently sued in state court for his reinstatement but was not successful.

== State legislation ==
On June 8, 2020, both houses of the New York state assembly passed the Eric Garner Anti-Chokehold Act, which stipulates that any police officer in the state of New York who injures or kills somebody through the use of "a chokehold or similar restraint" can be charged with a class C felony, punishable by up to 15 years in prison. New York Governor Andrew Cuomo signed the police reforms, which he described as "long overdue", into law on June 12, 2020.

== Popular culture ==
A poem by Ross Gay, "A Small Needful Fact" was written in 2015 as a response to Garner's death.

The single "Loyal Like Sid & Nancy" by Foster the People, released in 2017, includes the lyric "I can't breathe" and is partly a commentary about Garner's killing and Black Lives Matter.

Garner's plea can be heard on the opening track "The Landing" by Standing on the Corner, on their 2017 release Red Burns (album).

In 2018, a crime-drama film was released under the title of Monsters and Men, whose main plotline depicts the death of a cigarette-selling black man at the hands of the police being filmed by an onlooker and attracting public attention. Being inspired by a real story, and given the striking similarity with the incident, multiple film reviews considered the movie to be based on the death of Eric Garner.

The 2019 film American Trial: The Eric Garner Story follows an unscripted mock trial in which Pantaleo is tried for murder.

== See also ==
- List of unarmed African Americans killed by law enforcement officers in the United States
- Lists of killings by law enforcement officers in the United States
- List of killings by law enforcement officers in the United States, July 2014
- Murder of George Floyd
- Mothers of the Movement
- New York City Police Department corruption and misconduct
