= Excelsior (Slauson Malone 1 album) =

2023 studio album

Studio album by Slauson Malone 1
- Released: October 6, 2023
- Length: 42:03
- Label: Warp
- Producer: Jasper Marsalis; Andrew Lappin; Nicky Wetherell

Slauson Malone 1 chronology
A Quiet Farwell, 2016–2018 (2019)	Excelsior (2023)

Excelsior is the second studio album by American musician Jasper Marsalis, and his first under the alias Slauson Malone 1. The album was released on October 6, 2023, by Warp Records, Marsalis' first release with the label.

== Background and release ==
On August 15, 2023, Warp Records announced that they had signed Marsalis, and released his debut single with the label, "Voyager". "Voyager" came with a music video directed by Ryosuke Tanzawa. The song was described as sounding "like the familiar aesthetics of hip-hop and soul fed into a wormhole and pulled out the other end, indelibly stretched and scarred by the ordeal."

On September 5, Marsalis announced the album, set for an October 6 release by Warp, and released the album's second single, "New Joy", with a music video codirected by himself and Injury Reserve and By Storm's Parker Corey. On October 3, Marsalis released the third single, "Half-Life", with a lyric video.

The album is Marsalis' first under the alias Slauson Malone 1, having previously released A Quiet Farwell, 2016–2018 as just Slauson Malone. The song "Undercommons" is named after an essay collection by the Black cultural theorists Fred Moten and Stefano Harney.

== Style ==
The album includes a long list of genres, including no wave, free jazz, chamber music, modern classical, psychedelic rock, bedroom pop, noise rock, reggae, indie folk, lo-fi hip hop, surf-pop, indie pop, avant rock, dub, and baroque pop. Bandcamp Daily's Stephanie Barclay described the genre span as a "shapeshifting restlessness" where "you never know what you'll get next". Marsalis sings and plays several instruments on the album, including guitar, theremin, Mellotron, and Wurlitzer, while Nicky Wetherell provides cello. Other instruments include tape loops, harpsichord, bass, drums, electronics, strings, and synthesizers.

== Reception ==
Excelsior ratings
Review scores
Source	Rating
AllMusic	4/5 stars
Pitchfork	7.4/10

The Quietus' Arusa Qureshi called the album "a fascinating and hypnotic listen." AllMusic's Paul Simpson called the album "another vulnerable expression of raw truth that takes dozens of listens to begin to decipher, but it's entirely worth the effort." Barclay wrote that Marsalis' "restless searching" on the album "doesn't get exhausting", and that "it's easy enough to press play on this album and find yourself along for the ride, wherever it's going."

=== Year-end lists ===
Excelsior on year-end lists
Publication	#	Ref.
Crack	27	
The Quietus	14	

== Track listing ==
All tracks are written by Jasper Marsalis except where noted. All tracks produced by Marsalis and Andrew Lappin except where noted.

Excelsior track listing
No.	Title	Writer(s)	Producers	Length
1.	"The Weather"			2:41
2.	"House Music"			3:11
3.	"Undercommons"			1:49
4.	"Olde Joy"			2:29
5.	"New Joy"			3:17
6.	"Arms, Armor"		Marsalis	1:05
7.	"Fission for Drums, Piano and Voice"		Marsalis	0:36
8.	"Love Letter Zzz"			2:12
9.	"Half-Life"	Marsalis; Group Climate		4:45
10.	"The Great Wedge"		Marsalis	0:28
11.	"I Hear a New World"	Marsalis; Joe Meek		2:32
12.	"No! (Geiger Dub)"	Marsalis; Meek		3:13
13.	"Destroyer X"		Lappin; Nicky Wetherell	1:54
14.	"Voyager"			3:10
15.	"Divider"			2:02
16.	"Challenger"			1:27
17.	"Decades, Castle Romeo"	Marsalis; Lappin; Wetherell	Marsalis; Lappin; Wetherell	3:47
18.	"Us (Tower of Love)"	Marsalis; Lappin; Wetherell		1:25
Total length:				42:03

== Personnel ==
- Jasper Marsalis – mixing engineer, recording engineer (1–11, 14–16, 18)
- Andrew Lappin – recording engineer (2, 3, 5, 8–17)
