= List of killings by law enforcement officers in the United States, July 2014 =

This is a list of people reported killed by non-military law enforcement officers in the United States in July 2014, whether in the line of duty or not, and regardless of reason or method. The listing documents the occurrence of a death, making no implications regarding wrongdoing or justification on the part of the person killed or officer involved. Killings are arranged by date of the incident that caused death. Different death dates, if known, are noted in the description. The table below lists 86 people.

== July 2014 ==
Date	Name (Age) of Deceased	Race	State (City)	Description
2014-07-31	Donn Eastman (50)	White	Texas (San Antonio)	
2014-07-30	David A. Mendoza (32)	Black	Virginia (Bedford)	
2014-07-30	Andrew J. Michaelis (41)	White	North Carolina (Fayetteville)	
2014-07-30	Larry Andrew Flynn (42)	Unknown race	Washington (Seattle)	
2014-07-30	Richard Lee Nelson (52)	Unknown race	Hawaii (Waikiki)	After rear-ending a bus Nelson was seen drinking in his car by a nearby police officer. The police officer gave pursuit and Nelson began to drive erratically. According to Hawaii News Now, witnesses were said to have seen him make U-turns, put his car in reverse, and drive on sidewalks. The pursuing officer then shot Nelson to prevent injuries to others nearby.
2014-07-29	Brad David Jensen (34)	White	Washington (Pasco)	
2014-07-29	Jesse Vigil (51)	Hispanic	Nevada (Henderson)	
2014-07-29	Emilio Solis (36)	Hispanic	Texas (Hedwig)	
2014-07-29	Justin Phillip Steele (26)	White	Wyoming (Ethete)	
2014-07-29	Cody David Winters (27)	White	Nevada (Las Vegas)	
2014-07-29	Josh A. Edwards (25)	White	Illinois (Pana)	Edwards was killed in a police shoot out in a meth house. Three others were arrested.
2014-07-28	Charles Mozdir (32)	White	New York (New York)	A suspected sex offender, Charles Mozdir, was fatally shot at a smoke shop in Greenwich Village, Manhattan, where he was employed. Two U.S. marshals and a New York police officer were also wounded during the attempted arrest, and may have been wounded by Mozdir's gun. Mozdir was featured on The Hunt With John Walsh.
2014-07-28	Steven Isby (53)	Black	Illinois (Chicago)	A burglary suspect was shot and killed by a 20-year veteran police officer in the Bucktown neighborhood at 3:30 am. The officer and the suspect got into a struggle with the officer's firearm, and the officer was shot in the arm with his own weapon. The officer claimed he was in fear for his life and fired at the suspect, killing him.
2014-07-28	Patrick Small (27)	Black	South Carolina (Florence)	
2014-07-27	Charles Alver Jones Jr. (33)	White	Texas (Bloomburg)	
2014-07-27	Ronald Carden (45)	White	Tennessee (Knoxville)	Ron Carden was shot in the back by Knoxville Police Department Officer David Gerlach. The incident occurred just off to the side of the view of the cruiser mounted camera.
2014-07-27	Robert Henderson (37)	Black	West Virginia (Huntington)	An armed man, Robert Henderson, was shot and killed at the El Ranchito Mexican Bar. According to officers, Henderson did not comply with the officer's demands and made a threatening gesture.
2014-07-26	John Wrana (95)	White	Illinois (Park Forest)	
2014-07-25	Nicholas Lister (31)	White	Utah (Millcreek)	Lister was killed by police after he fired one round at them in his apartment complex, according to investigators. The officers came there to investigate a domestic dispute involving Lister.
2014-07-25	Luis Jobel (33)	Hispanic	California (Los Angeles)	Police received a call at 3:30 am of a man causing a disturbance in the Van Nuys neighborhood, throwing rocks and vandalizing property. Police arrived at the scene and shot and killed Luis Jobel.
2014-07-24	Lori Knowles (37)	White	Georgia (Henry County)	Knowles was shot and killed by police at her home. According to police, she was armed with an unspecified weapon.
2014-07-23	Harrison Carter (29)	Black	Florida (Belle Isle)	
2014-07-23	David Newmeyer (17)	White	Florida (Cross City)	
2014-07-22	Jay Donald Stankovitch (25)	White	Florida (Bell)	
2014-07-22	Joaquin Cibrian (29)	Hispanic	Texas (La Joya)	Standoff.
2014-07-22	Charles Leon Johnson II (29)	Black	Georgia (Adairsville)	
2014-07-22	Briatay McDuffie (19)	Black	Maryland (White Marsh)	
2014-07-22	Vamond Arqui Elmore (37)	Black	South Carolina (St. George)	
2014-07-22	Jeremy Robertson (33)	White	New Mexico (Albuquerque)	
2014-07-21	Donovan Bayton (54)	Black	Maryland (Silver Spring)	
2014-07-20	Jeffrey Carter McMillan (52)	White	Alabama (Spanish Fort)	
2014-07-20	Richard Duncalf (28)	White	Washington (Kent)	According to police, Duncalf fired at several officers, and officers returned fire, killing Duncalf.
2014-07-19	Francisco Rocha (41)	Hispanic	Illinois (Chicago)	
2014-07-18	Kenneth Alan Johnson (34)	White	Nevada (North Las Vegas)	According to Public Information Officer Aaron Patty, about 1:30 a.m., officers were attempting to pull over the man for a routine traffic stop near Ann Road and Camino Al Norte. The rider refused to stop for officers and led them on a pursuit, Patty said. The suspect ditched his vehicle at a home's front yard in the 700 block of Rio Royal Way and ran away. Police caught up with him in the 6000 block of Revere Street near Tropical Avenue, where an officer fired his gun, striking the man several times. According to NLV police, the man turned at officers at the time, confronted them and drew what looked like a black semi-automatic handgun.
2014-07-18	Jonathan L. Williams (25)	Black	Arizona (Tempe)	
2014-07-18	Cadence Harris (5)	White	Kansas (Leavenworth)	
2014-07-17	Eric Garner (43)	Black	New York (Staten Island, New York City)	Garner had just allegedly broken up a fight between several other men in Tompkinsville, Staten Island, when he was approached by two plainclothes police officers who questioned him about illegal cigarette sales. Garner got angry and the officers proceeded to arrest him. He resisted arrest and officer Daniel Pantaleo placed him in an apparent chokehold and slammed his head against the ground. Three more officers showed up and tried to arrest Garner. Garner began saying "I can't breathe" which he did eleven times. He went into cardiac arrest while he was in an ambulance. He was pronounced dead 1 hour later at a hospital. Use of the chokehold tactic by NYPD officers is prohibited. On August 1, 2014, the New York City Medical Examiner's Office ruled Garner's death to be a homicide. On December 2, 2014, the grand jury chose to not indict Pantaleo on charges relating to Garner's death, which ranged from murder to reckless endangerment. Subsequently, the U.S. Department of Justice opened up an investigation in Garner's death.
2014-07-17	Glenn Ray Glancey (71)	White	Oregon (Reedsport)	
2014-07-17	Allen Jay Foste (49)	Unknown race	Texas (Belton)	
2014-07-17	Andre Milton (36)	Black	California (San Leandro)	
2014-07-17	Justin Neil Davis (24)	White	Maryland (Germantown)	Three officers returned fire on Justin Davis, a Kentucky Army National Guard private, who fired on the officers at Cameron Brown Park on Farmington Boulevard. Davis had been sitting in his car with a rifle at the park and was believed to be suicidal and suffering from PTSD.
2014-07-16	Dominique Charon Lewis (23)	Black	Michigan (Flint Township)	
2014-07-16	Misty Holt-Singh (41)	White	California (Stockton)	2014 Stockton bank robbery. Two bank robbers and a hostage, 41-year-old Misty Holt-Singh, were shot and killed by police in an exchange of gunfire after a vehicular chase. Holt-Singh was abducted by the bank robbers and forced into a stolen SUV. A third bank robber, 19-year-old Jaime Ramos, and two other hostages (who were shot and ejected from the stolen vehicle during the chase) survived. Ramos was charged with murder in connection with the shooting.
2014-07-16	Gilbert Renteria Jr. (30)	Hispanic	California (Stockton)	2014 Stockton bank robbery. Two bank robbers and a hostage, 41-year-old Misty Holt-Singh, were shot and killed by police in an exchange of gunfire after a vehicular chase. Holt-Singh was abducted by the bank robbers and forced into a stolen SUV. A third bank robber, 19-year-old Jaime Ramos, and two other hostages (who were shot and ejected from the stolen vehicle during the chase) survived. Ramos was charged with murder in connection with the shooting.
2014-07-16	Alex Gregory Martinez (27)	Hispanic	California (Stockton)	2014 Stockton bank robbery. Two bank robbers and a hostage, 41-year-old Misty Holt-Singh, were shot and killed by police in an exchange of gunfire after a vehicular chase. Holt-Singh was abducted by the bank robbers and forced into a stolen SUV. A third bank robber, 19-year-old Jaime Ramos, and two other hostages (who were shot and ejected from the stolen vehicle during the chase) survived. Ramos was charged with murder in connection with the shooting.
2014-07-14	Michael Reams (47)	Black	California (Fresno)	Michael Reams was shot and killed by a Fresno Police officer who had been called by neighbors. Reams had stabbed his girlfriend multiple times during an argument. Both she and Reams died.
2014-07-14	Armando Noah Aleman (34)	White	Texas (Wichita Falls)	
2014-07-14	Timothy Mitchell (46)	White	Michigan (Munising Township)	
2014-07-13	Ronald Singleton (45)		New York (Manhattan, New York City)	After a taxi driver flagged police, officers restrained Singleton. His death was ruled a homicide. His death occurred several days before the death of Eric Garner, who also died after NYPD officers restrained him.
2014-07-13	David Brandstetter (26)	White	Arizona (Maricopa County)	An army veteran was reported walking naked in traffic. Police arrived, but when he opened the patrol car door and jumped on the officer inside, punching him and demanding his weapon, the officer shot him.
2014-07-13	Lawrence Campbell (27)	Black	New Jersey (Jersey City)	Lawrence Campbell entered a Walgreens at 4 a.m. and assaulted a security guard there, and then took his handgun. Officer Melvin Santiago arrived at the scene, and was then fatally shot by Campbell. Campbell was shot by other police officers.
2014-07-13	Adrian Eugene King (46)	White	North Carolina (Hendersonville)	
2014-07-13	Edward Lee Farlow (55)	White	Wyoming (Basin)	
2014-07-13	Ja Ma Lo Day (21)	Asian	California (San Diego)	
2014-07-12	Harold F. Roudebush (54)	White	Florida (Lady Lake)	
2014-07-12	Valerie Abbott Harrington (36)	White	South Carolina (Pawleys Island)	
2014-07-12	Coty Champagne (33)	White	Louisiana (New Iberia)	
2014-07-11	Joseph Kevin Greer (41)	White	Texas (Vidor)	
2014-07-11	James E. Hamm (67)	White	Kentucky (Princeton)	
2014-07-11	Ira James Arquette (42)	Native American	Washington (Wapato)	
2014-07-10	Frank Alvarado (40)	Hispanic	California (Salinas)	
2014-07-09	Luis Monroig (37)	White	Florida (Estero)	
2014-07-09	Stephen S. Minch (45)	White	Illinois (Granite City)	A St. Charles man who called 911 early this morning insisting police show up at a Granite City gas station was fatally shot by the arriving officers who say the man pointed a gun at them.
2014-07-09	Richard Robert Howard (49)	White	Washington (Pasco)	
2014-07-09	Charles K. Goodridge (53)	Black	Texas (Cypress)	
2014-07-09	Christopher Alexander Stone (26)	White	Texas (Sugar Land)	
2014-07-08	Dennis Dean Morrell (55)	Unknown race	Virginia (Bristol)	
2014-07-08	Stanley, Cedric (35)		Florida (Miami Springs)	
2014-07-08	James McKinney (29)	Black	California (Hayward)	McKinney was shot by officers at the Phoenix Lodge motel when they came there to investigate an incident involving McKinney at 4:00 am. According to police, McKinney was involved in a scuffle with people inside a motel room, and a woman suffered a cut to her mouth and scrapes and bruises to her arm and chest caused by McKinney. When police arrived at the scene, McKinney lunged at them and attempted to disarm them of their guns. McKinney was shot three times in the upper body by two officers and died at the scene.
2014-07-08	Jeanetta Marie Riley (35)	Native American	Idaho (Sandpoint)	Riley was acting erratic and armed with a knife outside of Bonner General Hospital. After police were called to the scene and Riley refused to stop approaching the officers she was shot and pronounced dead minutes later inside the emergency room.
2014-07-07	Shane Lucan Griffin (36)	White	Oregon (Molalla)	
2014-07-06	Rajko Utvic (37)	White	Wisconsin (Racine)	
2014-07-05	Christopher Jones (30)	Black	Missouri (Pine Lawn)	
2014-07-05	Nicholas Popplewell (27)	White	Oklahoma (Norman)	
2014-07-05	Marilyn Denise Boyd (59)	White	Iowa (Ankeny)	
2014-07-05	Warren Robinson (16)	Black	Illinois (Chicago)	Officers started chasing Robinson because he matched a caller's description, but lost him for a few minutes when he ducked into a gangway between Morgan and Sangamon Avenue, Camden said. The boy later hid under a car as officers caught up with him, police said. He began getting out from under the car and the officers told him to drop the gun, Camden said. He did not and the officers shot him, Camden said.
2014-07-04	Pedro Rios Jr. (14)	Hispanic	Illinois (Chicago)	Officers saw him crossing Cicero heading east with something sticking out of his waistband and tried to stop him, police said. Rios took off running and then pointed "a large revolver" at pursuing officers, according to a statement released by the police department. Officers fired and hit him, police said. He was pronounced dead about 10:10 p.m., according to the medical examiner's office.
2014-07-04	Icarus Randolph (26)	Black	Kansas (Wichita)	
2014-07-03	Ryan Ronquillo (20)	Hispanic	Colorado (Denver)	
2014-07-03	Lewis L. Williams (60)	White	Georgia (Atlanta)	
2014-07-03	Richard Arruda (40)	Hispanic	Florida (Fort Lauderdale)	
2014-07-02	Joseph Valverde (32)	Hispanic	Colorado (Denver)	
2014-07-02	Anthony Jacob Chavez (27)	White	New Mexico (Albuquerque)	
2014-07-01	Austin J. Derby (36)	White	Washington (Seattle)	Derby was involved in a high-speed chase with police and crashed his truck near Interstate 5. Derby then ran away into a shed, where police confronted him later. Derby then came out of the shed and pointed at them with a pellet gun designed to look realistic. The officers fatally shot Derby.
2014-07-01	Jerry Brown (41)	Black	Florida (Zephyrhills)	
2014-07-01	Michael Jones Keys Sr. (59)	White	Florida (Jacksonville)	

== See also ==
- Death in custody § United States
- Henry A. Wallace Police Crime Public Database
- List of cases of police brutality
- List of countries with annual rates and counts for killings by law enforcement officers
- List of law enforcement officers killed in the line of duty in the United States
- List of law enforcement officers convicted for an on-duty killing in the United States
- List of shootings by US immigration agents
- List of police reforms related to the George Floyd protests
- List of unarmed African Americans killed by law enforcement officers in the United States
- Lists of killings by law enforcement officers
- Police brutality in the United States
- Police misconduct § United States
- Police riot § United States
- Police use of deadly force in the United States
