= UKnoWhatImSayin? =

Studio album by Danny Brown
- Released: October 4, 2019
- Recorded: 2017–2019
- Studios: AbLab, New Jersey
- Genre: Hip-hop
- Length: 33:27
- Label: Warp
- Producers: Cartie Curt; Flying Lotus; JPEGMafia; Paul White; Playa Haze; Q-Tip; Slauson Malone; Standing on the Corner

Danny Brown chronology
Atrocity Exhibition (2016)	UKnoWhatImSayin? (2019)	Scaring the Hoes (2023)

Singles from UKnoWhatImSayin?
- 1. "Dirty Laundry" Released: September 5, 2019; 2. "Best Life" Released: September 17, 2019; 3. "3 Tearz" Released: October 2, 2019

UKnoWhatImSayin? (stylized as uknowhatimsayin¿) is the fourth studio album by American rapper Danny Brown. It was released on October 4, 2019, by Warp Records. The album features guest appearances from Run the Jewels, Obongjayar, JPEGMafia and Blood Orange. Executive produced by Q-Tip, with contributions by Paul White, Flying Lotus, Thundercat, Standing on the Corner and JPEGMafia, the album received widespread critical acclaim, appearing on several publications' year-end lists.

== Background ==
On November 1, 2017, Danny Brown revealed he was working on a follow-up effort to Atrocity Exhibition, telling Complex that the album was "being produced by one producer, who's legendary in hip-hop. And it's gonna be a big deal". Q-Tip, famous for being the main producer for New York hip-hop group A Tribe Called Quest, revealed his involvement with Brown's album during a guest appearance on Elton John's Rocket Hour show on Beats 1 radio on March 21, 2019. Brown initially began working with A Tribe Called Quest member Ali Shaheed Muhammad, before eventually working with Q-Tip instead. Brown later explained that the album and its title, UKnoWhatImSayin?, doesn't have a concept; "Half the time, when black people say, 'You know what I'm sayin'', they're never saying nothing ... This is just songs. You don't have to listen to it backwards. You don't have to mix it a certain way. You like it, or you don't".

== Recording and production ==
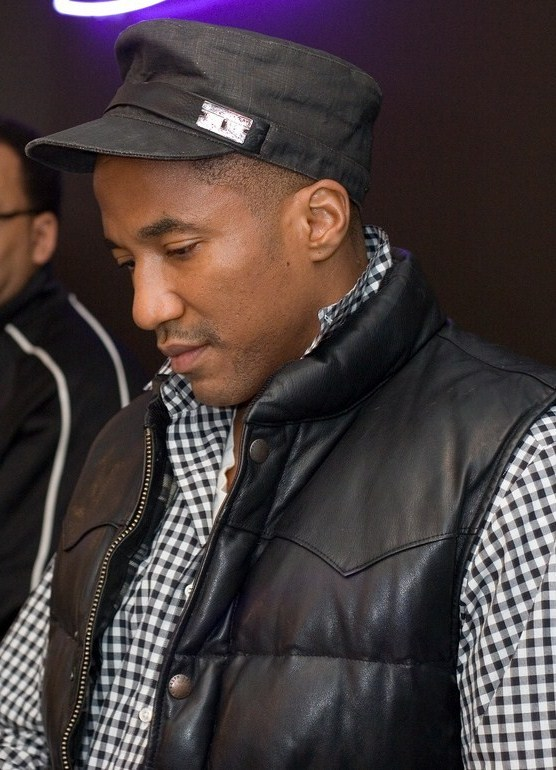
Q-Tip served as executive producer of the album, contributing three beats in the process

UKnoWhatImSayin? was recorded at Q-Tip's home studio, AbLab Studios in New Jersey. Working with Q-Tip, Brown felt that the recording process "was almost like I was an actor in a movie ... I just had to show up and know my lines". Brown described his previous rapping style as "a catch-lightning-in-a-bottle approach", however, he became accustomed to Q-Tip's attention to detail and experimentation, later stating, "Q-Tip wanted me to go back to that 'Greatest Rapper Ever' era. I almost had to relearn how to rap again—an ego death type thing. He gave me this whole new outlook on music. I can't go back to how I was before".

Brown mixed humor with music on UKnoWhatImSayin?, drawing inspiration from stand-up comedians Richard Pryor and Joey Diaz, as well as the Your Mom's House comedy podcast. He also watched gang documentaries and blaxploitation films while recording the album; "Tip would have that type of shit on in the studio. The 80 Blocks from Tiffany's documentary about the gangs of New York in the late '70s—we'd always have that on. Savage Nomads and all that shit; that's where all that shit come from". He was additionally inspired by UK garage, the grime mockumentary show People Just Do Nothing and Drakeo the Ruler's mixtape Cold Devil.

The majority of the album's production was done by Paul White (on four tracks) and Q-Tip (on three tracks), with White providing bass drum-driven atmospheric beats, while Q-Tip used psychedelic rock, soul and boom bap as a backdrop. The rest of the production was handled by Flying Lotus, JPEGMafia, Cartie Curt and Playa Haze, who contributed "grimy" and "nightmarish" beats. White was assisted by the band Standing on the Corner and producer Slauson Malone on the track "Shine", and Flying Lotus was joined by bass guitarist Thundercat on "Negro Spiritual".

Some of the album's material was made several years prior to recording; while discussing the song "Belly of the Beast", Brown said, "I probably had that beat since [2011's] XXX. That actual rap I wrote for [2013's] Old, but it was to a different beat". On a few tracks, Q-Tip re-sequenced the beat or added extra sounds, such as the organ on "3 Tearz". Brown claimed that the vocals for "Theme Song" were recorded over 300 times, adding that "I didn't get it right until the last week before [the album] was about to go into mastering".

== Release and promotion ==
Brown announced on April 30, 2019, that his fifth album UKnoWhatImSayin? would be released later that year, with executive production by Q-Tip. On June 4, 2019, Brown debuted a new track produced by Q-Tip, that would later be titled "Best Life", during his performance at Primavera Sound 2019. On September 5, 2019, the album's lead single, "Dirty Laundry", was released with an official music video. With the announcement, Brown also revealed the album's cover art and release date of October 4, 2019. On September 17, 2019, "Best Life" was released as the album's second single. The Run the Jewels-featured track "3 Tearz" premiered on Brown's Twitch live stream on October 1, 2019, and was released the next day as the third single from the album. The music video for "Best Life" was released on November 11, 2019, and the video for "3 Tearz" was released on February 3, 2020.

== Critical reception ==
Professional ratings
Aggregate scores
Source	Rating
AnyDecentMusic?	7.9/10
Metacritic	83/100
Review scores
Source	Rating
AllMusic	4/5 stars
Clash	9/10
Exclaim!	8/10
The Guardian	4/5 stars
Mojo	4/5 stars
NME	4/5 stars
The Observer	5/5 stars
Pitchfork	8.1/10
Q	4/5 stars
Rolling Stone	4/5 stars

UKnoWhatImSayin? was met with widespread critical acclaim. At Metacritic, which assigns a normalized rating out of 100 to reviews from professional publications, the album received an average score of 83, based on 21 reviews. Aggregator AnyDecentMusic? gave it 7.9 out of 10, based on their assessment of the critical consensus.

In his review for Q, Rupert Howe praised the album, writing, "Uknowhatimsayin¿ is Brown's most compelling set to date, but still boasts the wild-eyed, synaptic rush that made his earlier works so arresting". Andy Cowan of Mojo gave the album a favorable review, writing, "It's avowedly less manic, but Uknowhatimsayin¿ still cuts deep". In the review for AllMusic, Andy Kellman noted the more restrained mood of the album; "Danny Brown took his bats grotesquerie to its highest level yet with Atrocity Exhibition. Concurrent with his divergent pursuits and evolving public image ... the rapper dials back a bit with his follow-up and second Warp LP". Jayson Greene of Pitchfork saying "There is no moment where Brown grabs your lapels and demands you to feel what he's feeling, whatever it may be. He has called uknowhatimsayin¿ his 'standup comedy album', and the mastery on display is that of the comic going out there and killing. But the best-loved and most enduring comedians left their own blood out on the stage, too". Danny Schwartz of Rolling Stone said, "uknowhatimsayin¿ succeeds as a kind of high-wire act that balances Brown's folk hero status against his documentarian sensibilities, tragedy against comedy, bluster against self-mockery. It's shorter than his previous albums, and also lean in a way that few other rappers could replicate. Five albums in, he remains a singular talent who only needs a few short words to tell a good story". Writing for HipHopDX, Scott Glaysher believed that the album "could and should be considered one of Danny's strongest projects to date. Q-Tip's musical guidance (including making it a simple 11-song tracklist) plays a major role, but a lot of redeeming qualities on this album are a testament to Danny's artistry".

The Guardian's critic Ben Beaumont-Thomas said, "As a whole it's slightly too laid back to match the masterpiece status of 2016's Atrocity Exhibition, but Brown is still leaving encrusted marks on the hall of fame". Writing for NME, Dhruva Balram stated, "Where his previous projects felt sprawling, uknowhatimsayin¿ succeeds in feeling compact while delivering a powerful project that is expertly produced and concisely executed". Calum Slingerland of Exclaim! wrote, "It's Brown's pen game and ear for production that carry the album's comedic spirit, anchored by technical and stylistic changes".

=== Year-end lists ===
Select year-end rankings of UKnoWhatImSayin?
Publication	List	Rank	Ref.
Billboard	50 Best Albums of 2019	47	
Clash	Clash Albums of the Year 2019	15	
Complex	Best Albums of 2019	9	
The Line of Best Fit	The Best Albums of 2019	17	
Now	The 10 Best Albums of 2019	8	
Paste	The 50 Best Albums of 2019	23	
Pitchfork	The 50 Best Albums of 2019	48	
Sputnikmusic	Top 50 Albums of 2019	33	
Stereogum	Best Albums of 2019	40	
Uproxx	The Best Albums of 2019	49	

== Track listing ==
UKnoWhatImSayin? track listing
No.	Title	Writer(s)	Producer(s)	Length
1.	"Change Up"	Daniel Sewell; Paul White	White	2:41
2.	"Theme Song"	Sewell; Christopher Cross	Cartie Curt	2:46
3.	"Dirty Laundry"	Sewell; Kamaal Fareed; John Mills-Cockell	Q-Tip	3:04
4.	"3 Tearz" (featuring Run the Jewels)	Sewell; Jaime Meline; Michael Render; Barrington Hendricks; Yoko Ono	JPEGMafia	3:56
5.	"Belly of the Beast" (featuring Obongjayar)	Sewell; Steven Umoh; White	White	2:34
6.	"Savage Nomad"	Sewell; Deven Welch	Playa Haze	3:28
7.	"Best Life"	Sewell; Fareed; Palmer James	Q-Tip	2:33
8.	"UKnoWhatImSayin?" (featuring Obongjayar)	Sewell; Umoh; White	White	2:55
9.	"Negro Spiritual" (featuring JPEGMafia)	Sewell; Hendricks; Steven Ellison; Stephen Bruner	Flying Lotus	2:44
10.	"Shine" (featuring Blood Orange)	Sewell; Devonté Hynes; White; Gio Escobar; Jasper Marsalis	White; Standing on the Corner; Slauson Malone	3:18
11.	"Combat"	Sewell; Fareed	Q-Tip	3:38
Total length:				33:27

Notes

- "Theme Song" features uncredited vocals by ASAP Ferg
- "U Know What I'm Sayin?" is stylized as "uknowhatimsayin¿"
- "Combat" features uncredited vocals by Q-Tip and Consequence

Sample credits

- "Theme Song" contains elements from "Het Is Zo Stil", written by Pieter Verlinden and Josine van Dalsum, as performed by Josine van Dalsum.
- "Dirty Laundry" contains elements from "Aurora Spinray", written by John Mills-Cockell, as performed by Syrinx.
- "3 Tearz" contains elements from "Why Not", written and performed by Yoko Ono.
- "Belly of the Beast" contains elements from "Wind", written by Laurence Creme and Kevin Godley, as performed by Godley & Creme.
- "Savage Nomad" contains elements from "Tak Zazpívej Jí Blues", written by Otakar Petřina and Zdeněk Rytíř, as performed by Ota Petřina.
- "Best Life" contains elements from "To Make You Happy", written by Thomas McGee, as performed by Tommy McGee.

== Personnel ==
Credits are adapted from AllMusic.

- Blood Orange – featured artist (track 10)
- Brain Dead – design
- Cartie Curt – producer (track 2)
- Nina Creese – engineer
- DJ Playa Haze – producer (track 6)
- Ken "Supa Engineer" Duro – mixing
- Flying Lotus – producer (track 9)
- JPEGMafia – featured artist (track 9), producer (track 4)
- Tom Keelan – photography
- Obongjayar – featured artist (tracks 5, 8)
- Q-Tip – executive producer, producer (tracks 3, 7, 11)
- Run the Jewels – featured artist (track 4)
- Tatsuya Sato – mastering
- Thundercat – bass (track 9)
- Christos Tsantilis – engineer
- Paul White – producer (tracks 1, 5, 8, 10)

== Charts ==
Chart performance for UKnoWhatImSayin?
Chart (2019)	Peak position
Belgian Albums (Ultratop Flanders)	131
Canadian Albums (Billboard)	93
Irish Albums (IRMA)	94
US Billboard 200	134
