= Loosie =

Single cigarette

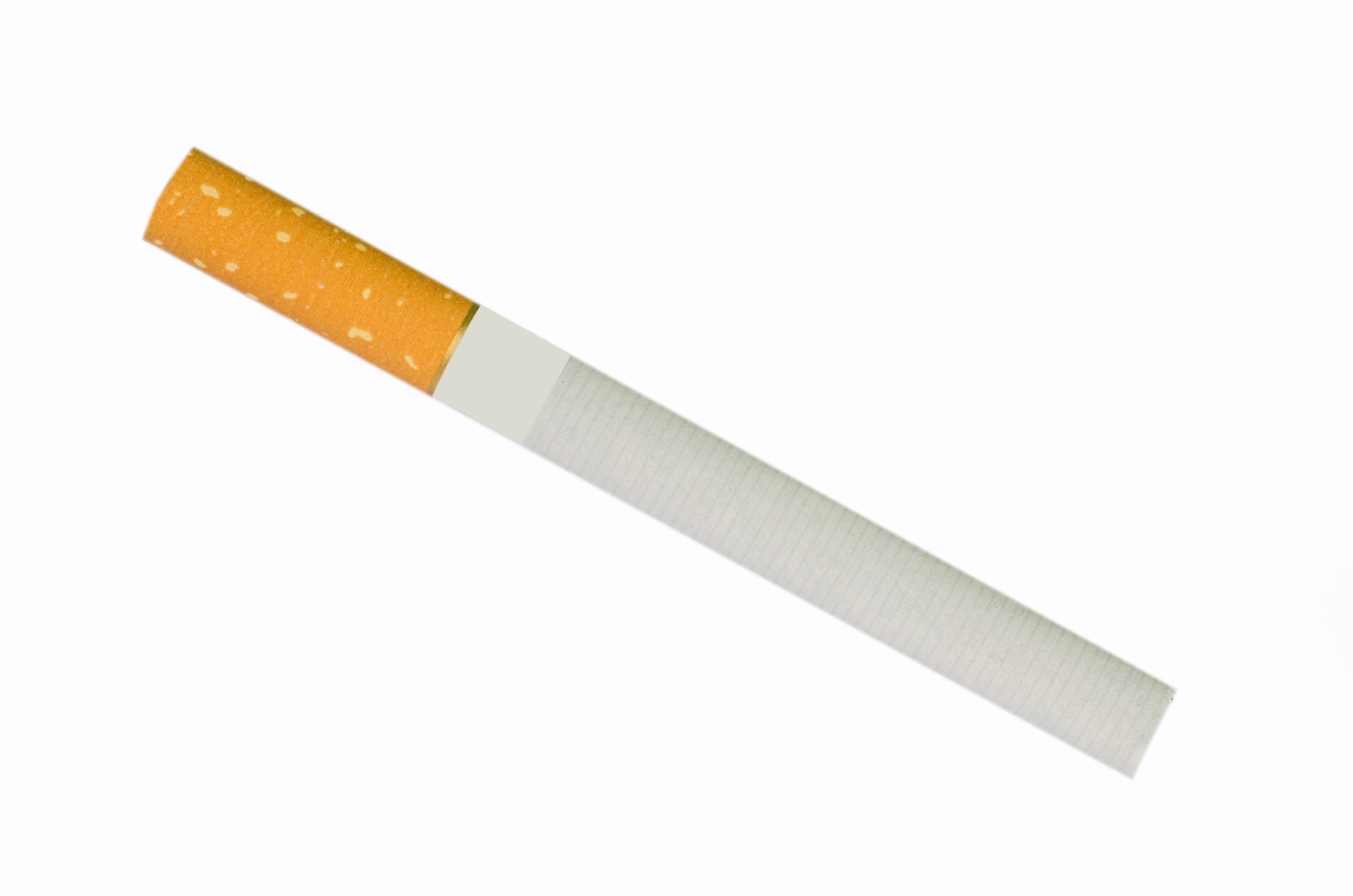
A single cigarette

In the United States, a loosie (or loosey) is a single cigarette that is purchased or sold.

In the United States, cigarettes are required to be sold in quantities of no fewer than 20. The FDA is concerned that loose cigarettes may be sold more often to children. Loosies are commonly found in low-income areas. The high cost of cigarettes due to increased taxation has been blamed for increased sales of loosies.

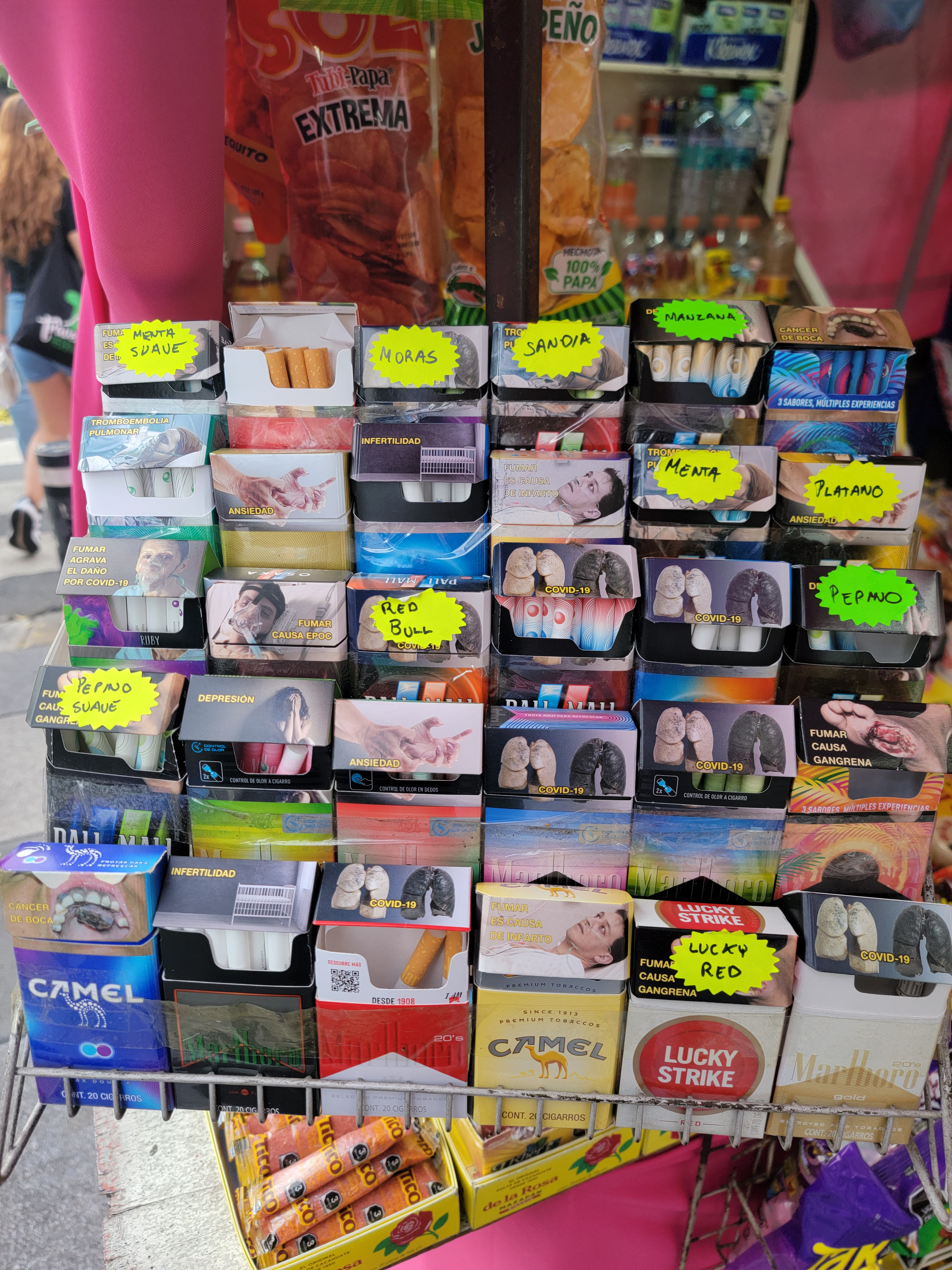
Loose cigarettes for sale in Mexico City

In 2014, Eric Garner was killed when NYPD officers attempted to arrest him for allegedly selling loosies.

== See also ==
- Illicit cigarette trade – Trade in tobacco goods which fail to comply with legislation
- Reselling – Company or individual that buys goods or services for resale
