= Medhane =

American rapper (born c.1997)

- Born: Medhane-Alam Olushola c. 1997 (age 28–29); Brooklyn, New York, US
- Genres: Alternative hip-hop
- Instrument: Vocals

Medhane-Alam Olushola (born c. 1997), known mononymously as Medhane, is an American rapper and producer.

== Biography ==
Born c. 1997, in Brooklyn, Olushola is a graduate from Carnegie Mellon University.

Olushola was also part of the duo Medslaus, along with Jasper Marsalis, using his alias Slauson Malone.

== Artistry ==
Olushola's music is noted for its sample-heavy soulful production, considered alternative hip-hop and has been compared to that of Mike's. He cites Future as an influence.

== Discography ==
- Double or Nothing (2024; with Kahlil Blu)
- Do the Math (2021)
- Amethyst of Morning (2021)
- Cold Water (2020)
- FULL CIRCLE (2020)
- Own Pace (2019)
- Ba Suba, Ak Jamm (2018; EP)
- Poorboy (2017; with Jasper Marsalis as Medslaus)
- Greys in Yellow (2015; with Jasper Marsalis as Medslaus)
