= Warm up (disambiguation) =

Warming up is the preparation for physical exertion or a performance by exercising or practising gently beforehand.

Warm up, warmup, or warm-ups may also refer to:

== Entertainment ==
- Warm Up (EP), by Bad Gyal, 2021
- Warm Up!, a racing simulator
- The Warm Up, a 2009 mixtape by J. Cole
- Opening act, act performed before the headline
- Vocal warm-up, exercises for the voice

== Clothing ==
- Sweatpants, a type of soft pants
- Track suit, a type of suit designed to keep the body warm

== Exercise ==
- Warming up
- Stretching
