= 2014 Stockton bank robbery =

2014 bank robbery and shootout in Stockton, California

Coordinates: 38.0202°N 121.3240°W

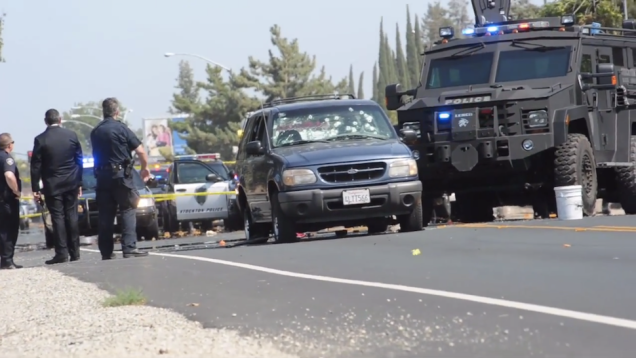
- Location: Stockton, California, US
- Date: July 16, 2014; 2:00 p.m. – 3:18 p.m. (UTC-8)
- Target: A branch of Bank of the West
- Attack type: Bank robbery, hostage-taking, car chase, shootout
- Weapons: One AK-47, three handguns
- Deaths: 3 (two perpetrators and one hostage)
- Injuries: 2
- Perpetrators: Alex Martinez (killed); Jaime Ramos; Gilbert Renteria (killed); Pablo Ruvalcaba

On July 16, 2014, three armed suspects robbed a Bank of the West branch in Stockton, California, United States. After taking three hostages, the suspects fled the scene, pursued by officers of the Stockton Police Department (SPD) in an hour-long pursuit that ended in a shootout. Over the course of the incident, almost 1,000 rounds were exchanged between police and the suspects.

Though no police officers or bystanders were hurt, two suspects were killed, two hostages were injured, one hostage was killed by police gunfire, and numerous vehicles and other property were damaged or destroyed. A fourth suspect was also arrested after the incident.

== Background ==
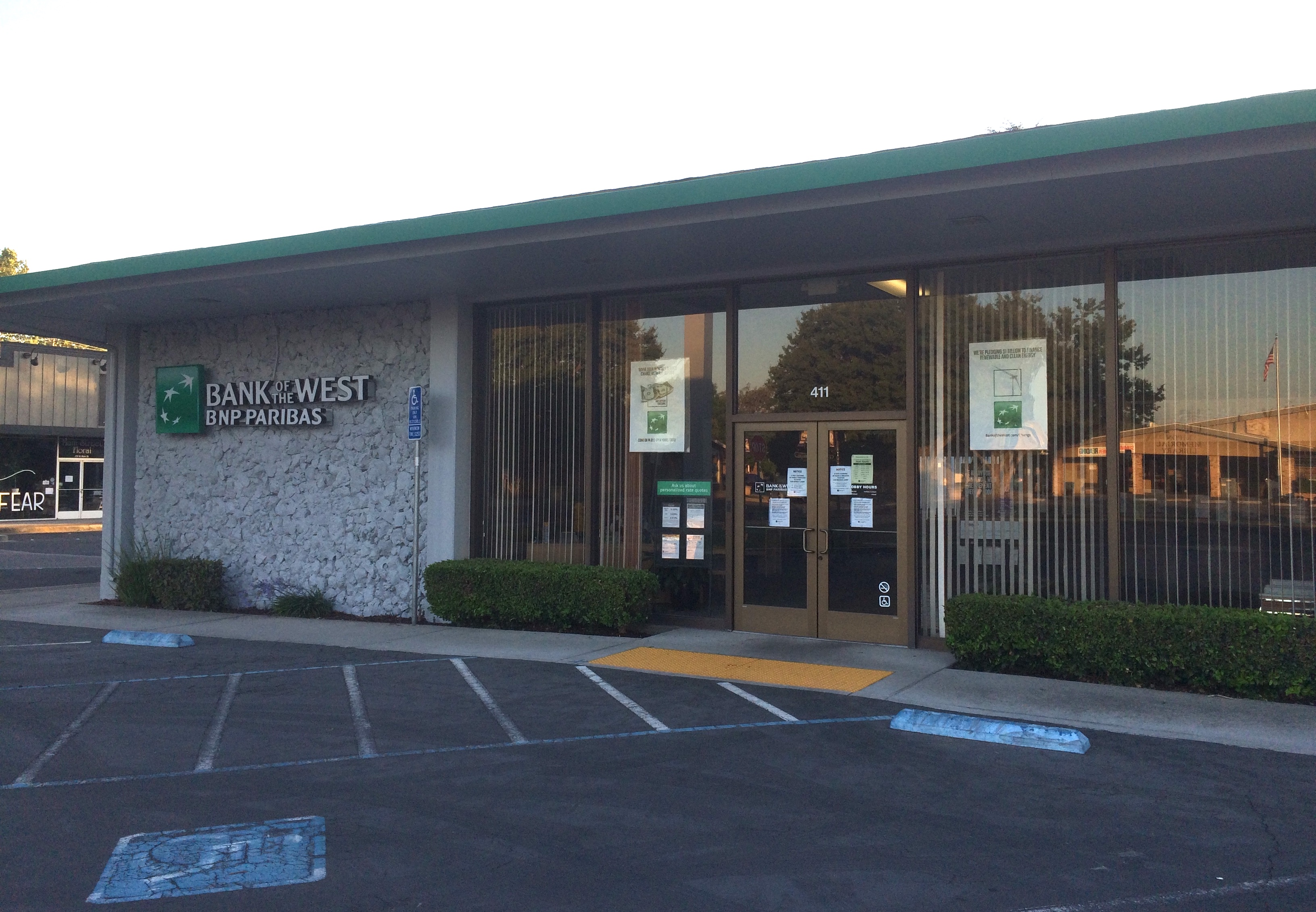
A Bank of the West branch in Ripon, California, located approximately 26 miles south of 7810 Thornton Road in nearby Stockton.

Bank of the West was an American financial institution headquartered in nearby San Francisco, operating around 600 branches in the Midwestern and Western United States. The branch that was robbed was located in northern Stockton, at 7810 Thornton Road. July 16 was the Thornton Road branch's final day of business; it was slated to permanently close at the end of the day.

In 2012, the City of Stockton filed for bankruptcy. The Stockton Police Department was greatly affected by the bankruptcy, which stripped them of 100 veteran officers, reduced the quality of their training, limited their ability to purchase equipment, and forced them to replace staffing losses with inexperienced rookies. The department also lacked police aviation resources and was required to request air support from other agencies, such as the San Joaquin County Sheriff's Department (SJCSD) and the California Highway Patrol (CHP). At the time of the incident however, only two police aircraft were nearby: an SJCSD fixed-wing aircraft with their narcotics unit, and a CHP helicopter based in Auburn, 65 miles away from Stockton.

The suspects—Pablo Ruvalcaba, Jaime Ramos, Gilbert Renteria, and Alex Martinez—were believed to be part of the Norteños street gang, which was selling methamphetamine in Stockton. Investigators had been gathering information and intelligence on Renteria and Martinez in the years prior to the robbery. A complaint filed in November 2008 named Renteria and Martinez alongside other defendants for possession of a controlled substance for sale, possession of marijuana for sale, marijuana cultivation, and street terrorism. Two of the suspects, believed to be Renteria and Martinez, had robbed the same Bank of the West branch only five months prior, on January 31, 2014.

== Events ==
=== Robbery ===
Shortly after 2:00 p.m., a dark-colored four-door Buick parked outside the Bank of the West branch, driven by Ruvalcaba and containing Ramos, Renteria, and Martinez, who exited the Buick. Wearing hoodies, baseball caps, fake facial hair, and backpacks, and armed with an AK-47 and handguns, the three of them approached the bank. They grabbed 41-year-old Misty Holt-Singh, who was using the ATM at the front of the building with her 12-year-old daughter Mia waiting in her car, and dragged her into the bank as they entered. Ruvalcaba left the scene in his Buick.

The suspects took Holt-Singh hostage, alongside branch manager Kelley Huber; the tellers, including teller Stephanie Koussaya; the branch's security guard; and several customers. Huber recognized two of the suspects from the January robbery. One of the suspects ordered Huber to open the vault, and though they were disappointed with the low amount of money inside, they still managed to fill at least one backpack with money.

Though Huber was unable to activate the robbery alarm, a Bank of the West security employee noticed the robbery on their security camera feed and alerted the SPD; additionally, a passing pedestrian witnessing the robbery flagged down a passing police officer, who reported the robbery to dispatch. SPD officers across the city, including a group conducting K-9 training, responded to the call. SPD Chief Eric Jones learned of the robbery while conducting a news interview about new police hires, and promptly ended the interview to monitor the situation.

Attempting to flee before police could arrive, the suspects asked if anyone had a vehicle they could use; Huber offered the keys to her blue second generation Ford Explorer. As they left for Huber's car, bringing her with them, they noticed a police officer taking position in the parking lot and retreated back into the building. The suspects asked Huber for a second exit, but she lied and claimed the only exit was the front entrance. The suspects took three hostages—Huber, Holt-Singh, and Koussaya—and exited the bank, holding the hostages as leverage. An officer who had previously responded to the January robbery ordered the suspects to surrender and noted that, while two of the suspects appeared willing to surrender, the third one, their apparent leader, continued on. Though the officer contemplated shooting the suspects or the tires of the Explorer, he decided not to, out of fears that the bullet would go through and strike a hostage or bystander.

=== Pursuit ===
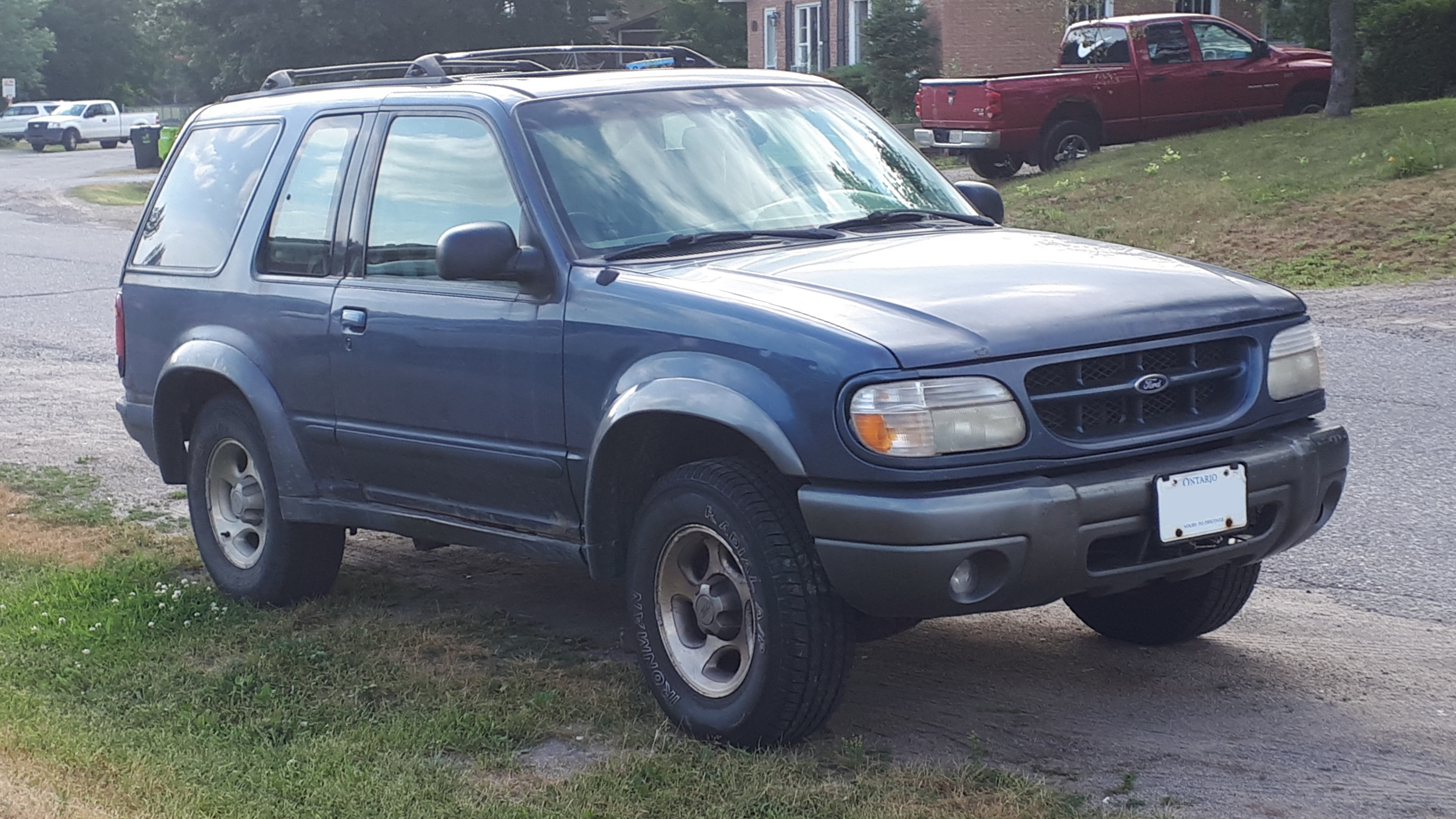
A 1995–2001 Ford Explorer similar in appearance to the vehicle used by the suspects

At 2:17 p.m., the suspects made it to Huber's Explorer and, after entering the vehicle with the hostages, ordered Huber to drive through the parking lot exit that was not blocked by police. Five blocks from the bank, a suspect in the back accidentally shot Huber in the leg; the bullet passed through her thigh and her ankle, shattering the bone. As Huber could no longer drive, the suspect at the front opened the driver-side door and pushed her out of the Explorer, taking her seat and driving away with the remaining two hostages. Huber survived and was treated at the scene by officers before an ambulance transported her to a hospital. Shortly after, a SWAT team secured the bank and freed the remaining hostages.

Several blocks from the bank, the rear windshield of the Explorer was blown out by gunfire from the suspects, and one suspect armed with an AK-47 took a position at the rear of the vehicle. At 2:20 p.m., the suspect with the AK-47 fired at the lead pursuing police car, destroying its tires. Further shots were fired at the intersection of Thornton Road and Wagner Heights, and the suspects continued to sporadically fire at police throughout the pursuit. SPD units across the city, told to remain in their respective beats, could not bear standing by while hearing the pursuit unfold over their radios and joined the pursuit. Several officers messaged their loved ones out of fears they would be hurt or killed in the pursuit, while others tried to rationalize the danger they were in.

By 2:33 p.m., the pursuit continued northbound on California State Route 99 toward Lodi. By now, the pursuit had reached approximately 120 mph, and over 50 police vehicles had joined the pursuit, including the SPD SWAT's Lenco BearCat armored vehicle and a SJCSD plane. Police briefly lost the suspects as it left the freeway into Lodi, but they were eventually located and returned to Route 99.

After passing through Lodi, the suspects briefly left Route 99 before returning to the freeway southbound back to Stockton. At 2:48 p.m., the Explorer pulled off the highway at the Morada Lane exit, using the trees and brush at the exit in an attempt to ambush the pursuing officers. SPD Captain Doug Anderson, who was responding to the pursuit and had been attempting to intercept the suspects, noticed the Explorer and, realizing what they were doing, shot at the suspects, forcing the Explorer to flee westbound on Morada Lane. In retrospect, police were certain that, had Anderson not noticed the ambush attempt, the suspects likely would have killed an officer. Minutes later, the BearCat attempted to perform a PIT maneuver on the Explorer, but missed; the suspects promptly shot out one of the BearCat's tires, forcing it to withdraw. Around 2:57 p.m., the suspects went on Interstate 5 toward Stockton for eight miles before pulling off the highway, attempting to set up another ambush; the SJCSD plane notified the pursuing officers of this, and the suspects and police briefly exchanged fire before the pursuit continued.

After the pursuit entered a residential area of Stockton, Koussaya, noticing the BearCat and fearing being caught in the crossfire between SWAT and the suspects, attempted to discreetly unlock the door of the Explorer to escape. At 3:15 p.m., she leapt out of the Explorer as it was traveling at roughly 50 mph. Several officers pulled to the side and treated her injuries before an ambulance could arrive. The suspects eventually returned to Thornton Road, where they encountered several officers on foot. The suspects and the officers exchanged gunfire, and the officers managed to shoot out the Explorer's tires. Half a mile later, the Explorer came to a stop on a four-lane stretch of road.

=== Shootout ===
The pursuing officers stopped behind the Explorer and fanned out across the street, using cruisers, trees, and street furniture as cover. Officers promptly opened fire on the vehicle, firing over 600 rounds at the suspects before a lieutenant ordered the officers to cease fire. Several officers noted chaos and confusion as other officers fired in the general direction of the Explorer and not at specific targets. The BearCat arrived and, despite having a tire disabled, was used as moving cover for the SWAT team as they approached the vehicle and opened the doors.

Renteria and Martinez were both fatally shot by police, though only one of them died at the scene (it is unclear exactly who); the other suspect was alive, but died while being transported to a hospital. Holt-Singh was dead, lying on the floorboard of the Explorer. The SWAT team found Ramos lying under her, alive and practically unharmed; the SPD alleged he used her as a human shield. Ramos surrendered to police and was promptly taken into custody.

== Aftermath ==
Between 700 and 1,000 rounds were fired by police and the suspects over the course of the pursuit and shootout: approximately 600+ by police and 100+ by the suspects. Over the course of the pursuit, 14 police vehicles were damaged or disabled by gunfire from the suspects.

SPD Chief Eric Jones shared details of the incident with the media, and confirmed that police bullets that killed Holt-Singh, who was struck by 10 bullets in total.

The 33 officers who discharged their weapons over the course of the incident were questioned and put on administrative leave. Chief Jones spoke with officers and organized the SPD's Wellness System to ensure his officers' mental well-being. He also visited the surviving hostages and their families, as well as Holt-Singh's family, apologizing for what happened and offering the SPD's support for them.

Representatives for all three hostages filed intents to sue the City of Stockton for the actions of the police officers.

The Bank of the West Thornton Road branch closed after the robbery, as that was the branch's final day in operation. The location, 7810 Thornton Road, is now a Starbucks.

=== Investigation ===
SPD investigators were already investigating Renteria and Martinez for gang and narcotics offenses. Following the robbery, detectives reinvestigated the previous robbery from January and confirmed that two of the suspects had committed that same robbery. They noticed a similar modus operandi: the robbers were armed, had similar disguises, were dropped off by a driver, and left in vehicles owned by bank employees.

Ramos, the only surviving robber, was taken into custody at the scene, and was charged with three counts of murder and 22 counts of attempted murder of police officers. The SPD alleged he used Holt-Singh to shield himself from police gunfire, causing her death. In 2016, he pleaded guilty to avoid a possible death sentence and was sentenced to life in prison.

Ruvalcaba was initially announced to be a person of interest, as investigators were not certain of his involvement. He turned himself in on September 16 and was released the same day. Following further investigation, he was arrested without incident by federal agents in Merced on December 22, and was charged with aiding and abetting. In 2016, he received a sentence of 25 years to life in prison.

== See also ==
- Norco shootout – Similar 1980 incident, also in California, involving bank robbers shooting at police during a pursuit
- 2019 Miramar shootout – Similar 2019 incident where police shot and killed two robbers, but also a hostage and a bystander
