= Standing on the Corner (band) =

American experimental jazz and hip-hop group

Standing On The Corner
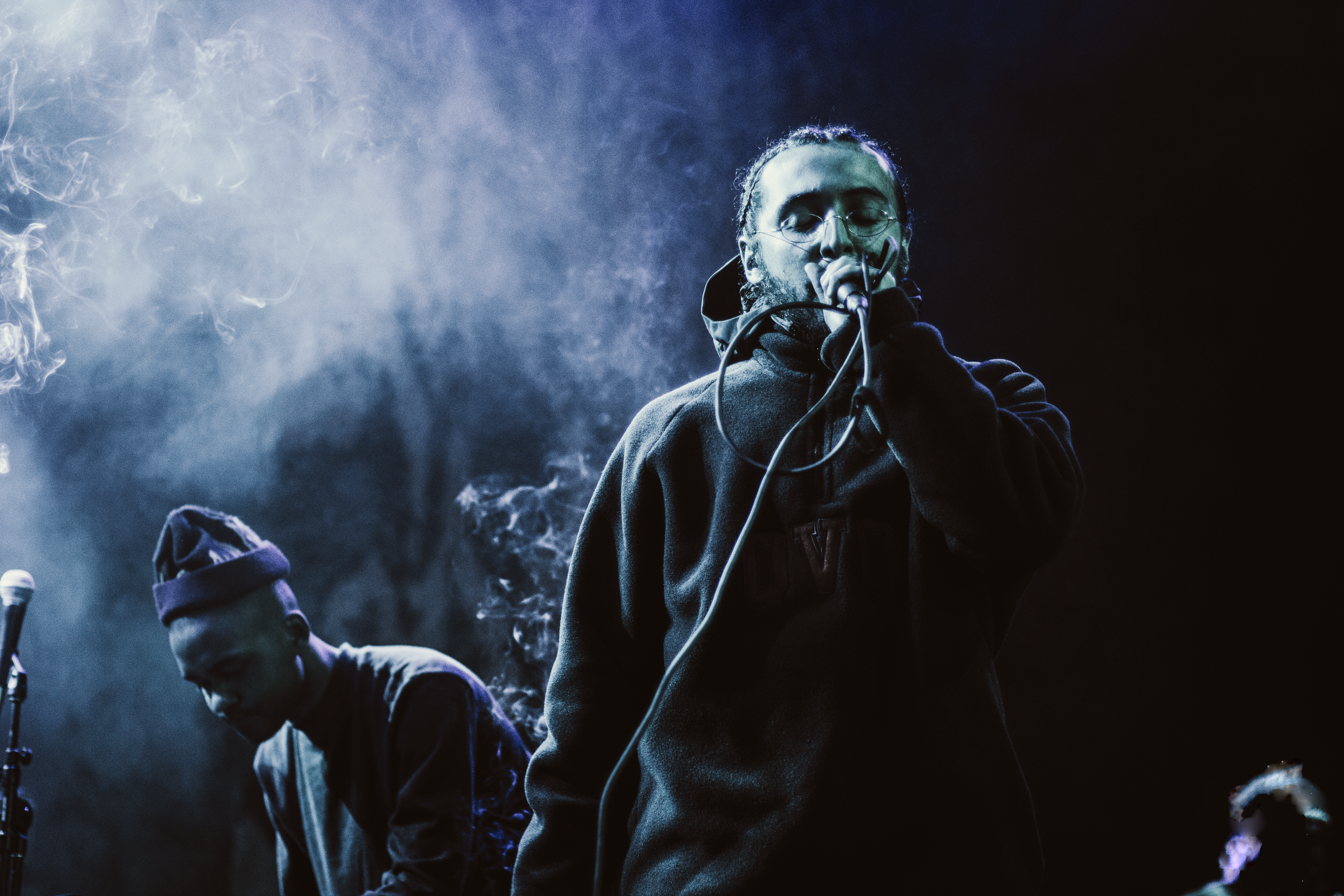
- Gio Escobar (right) and Jasper Marsalis (left) performing with Standing On The Corner in 2018.

Background information
- Also known as: Standing on the Corner Art Ensemble; SOTC; Children of the Corner (2014–2016)
- Origin: Crown Heights, Brooklyn, U.S.
- Genres: Avant-garde; experimental jazz; alternative hip hop; hypnagogic pop
- Years active: 2014–present
- Labels: Creative Mysteries Arts; XL
- Members: Gio Escobar; Jack Nolan; Lila Ramani; Nate Cox; Syl Dubenion; Savannah Harris; Buz
- Past members: Caleb Giles; Jasper Marsalis; Tomin Perea-Chamblee
- Website: standingonthecorner.com

Standing on the Corner is an American avant-garde music collective led by Gio Escobar. Emerging from the New York underground art and music scene, they have been referred to as a post-genre band and praised for their use and blends of different sounds.

== History ==
=== Origins & Standing on the Corner (2014–2016) ===
In 2014, Gio Escobar and Jack Nolan formed a guitar-based live group called Children of the Corner; the name was an homage to Harlem rap collective Children of the Corn. This project later evolved into Standing on the Corner. Escobar and Nolan wrote several tape machine-recorded songs that were not initially intended for release. Later Escobar brought some of those same demos he was working on to producer Jasper Marsalis, who helped produce them. Work on those songs resulted in the band's 2016 self-titled debut album.

=== Red Burns & other work (2017–2024) ===
In 2017, Standing on the Corner released their second album Red Burns. Soon after the release of Red Burns, Marsalis left the group. In 2019, they contributed to Solange's album When I Get Home, with production and writing credits on the songs "S McGregor (interlude)", "Can I Hold the Mic (interlude)", "Down With the Clique", "Nothing Without Intention (interlude)", "Exit Scott (interlude)", and "Not Screwed! (interlude)". After their contributions to Solange's project, multi-instrumentalist Caleb Giles announced he was leaving the group on good terms to focus on his solo rap career.

Standing on the Corner earned production credits on Danny Brown's 2019 album UKnoWhatImSayin? for the track "Shine". On May 11, 2020, they released the video for their single "Angel", starring Melvin Van Peebles. Peebles is a major influence for their catalog, with the group having sampled him multiple times, implementing spoken word passages into their record in a similar vein to Peebles' own albums.

In 2023, Standing on the Corner debuted the Taino Needle Science Drone Acupuncture Program, at Performance Space New York. The program ran from February 1 to June 30.

=== Standing on the Corner II (2025–present) ===
In 2025, Standing on the Corner released a series of singles titled "Baby", "R U Scared?" and "Friends 2day Enemies 2morrow" via XL Recordings. Later that same year, they put out a CD-only single that featured three different versions of a song titled "Gimme My Gun". These would later appear on their third album, Standing on the Corner II. The album, which includes features from Danny Brown, Solange, Sonia Sanchez and Styles P, was initially released on DVD, before being reissued on vinyl and digital formats in 2026.

== Members ==
=== Current members ===
- Gio Escobar (born Giovanni Cortez) - vocals, production, guitar, bass (2014–present)
- Jack Nolan - guitar, bass (2014–present)
- Standing on the Corner Art Ensemble
  - Nate Cox (Nathanael Cox) - song writing, vocals
  - Syl Dubenion
  - Buz (Buz Donald)
  - Clerida Eltimé

=== Past members ===
- Oluwaseun Odubiro - bass, production (2017–2020)
- Tomin Perea-Chamblee - cornet, alto clarinet, bass clarinet (2018-2020)
- Jasper Marsalis - Mixing Engineer (2016–2019)
- Savannah Harris - Drums (2018-2021)
- Caleb Giles - vocals, production, saxophone (2016–2017)

== Discography ==
=== Studio albums ===
- Standing on the Corner (2016)
- Red Burns (2017)
- Standing on the Corner "II" (2026)

=== Extended plays ===
- G-E-T-O-U-T!! The Ghetto (2020)
- Baby (2025)

=== Livestreamed albums ===
- Afroprojection #1: The Atmosphere Phased at 120º and Went Blank When the Universe Collapsed: A Piece on Black Psychiatry and Alternate Dimensions (2018)

=== Live recordings ===
- SOTC Double Bass Ensemble 4/24/19 (2019)
- SOTC Art Ensemble 4/27/19 (2019)

=== for Taino Needle Science ===
- Feel No Pain: Taino Needle Science (2023)
- Health Is NOT Mysterious: Sounds from the Taino Needle Science (2023)
- Music 4 Drone Acupuncture (2023)

== Other credits ==
=== Medslaus - Poorboy (2017) ===
- Guest vocals, production and songwriting on "Wontbleedme!" with Jasper Marsalis

=== MIKE - May God Bless Your Hustle (2017) ===
- Production on "Greed"

=== Caleb Giles - There Will Be Rain (2018) ===
- Guest vocals, production and songwriting on "The Flood" and "Wondering" with Jasper Marsalis

=== MIKE - Black Soap (2018) ===
- Instrumentation on all tracks

=== Earl Sweatshirt - Some Rap Songs (2018) ===
- Mixing and engineering on all tracks with Earl Sweatshirt
- Guest vocals and songwriting on "Ontheway!"
- Bass guitar on "Ontheway!" and "Riot!"

=== Solange - When I Get Home (2019) ===
- Production and songwriting on "S McGregor (Interlude)", "Down With the Clique", "Nothing Without Intention (Interlude)", "Exit Scott (Interlude)", and "Not Screwed! (Interlude)" with various others
- Guest vocals on "Not Screwed! (Interlude)"

=== Danny Brown - UKnoWhatImSayin? (2019) ===
- Production and songwriting on "Shine" with Paul White and Jasper Marsalis

=== Prophet Thaddeus - Extended PLAY 1 (2023) ===
- Executive production

=== Medhane - Offering (2025) ===
- Production on "Lookin4"
