= Red Burns (album) =

2017 album by Standing on the Corner

Studio album by Standing on the Corner
- Released: September 11, 2017
- Genre: Neo-soul; sound collage; hypnagogic pop; avant-garde jazz; alternative hip-hop; psychedelic soul
- Length: 62:56

Standing on the Corner chronology
Standing on the Corner (2016)	Red Burns (2017)	Afroprojection #1 (2018)

Alternate cover

Red Burns is the second album by the American experimental collective Standing on the Corner. It was released on September 11, 2017.

The album features collaborations with their friends and the local New York creative community including MIKE, sLUms, EMC, and Lila Ramani of Crumb.

== Release ==
Red Burns was released through their official website on September 11, tying the album and the imagery to the duos connection to New York. Even though their previous album had also been released on the same date the previous year, they revealed that had happened by chance. Escobar detailed the importance of that date and being a New Yorker and the contrast of the sense of vulnerability in a city that otherwise has a very confident character. "As much as you love this place, it's very unforgiving and harsh. It's not easy. There are worse places to be, granted. I think [using the imagery of] the towers, that's the perfect way of saying that without saying that."

== Critical reception ==
Professional ratings
Review scores
Source	Rating
Pitchfork	8.0/10

Red Burns received acclaim for its genre-bending freeform music and what it manages to capture in an audio-scrapbook manner. Many critics citing the project's ability to capture their essence of New York City. For example, Sheldon Pearce of Pitchfork wrote "Red Burns is a dazzling sensory experience, a city tour in which each track is like a street sign...and Red Burns seems designed as a sort of multidimensional diagram of New York City, the diverse perspectives it shapes, and the varying journeys inside its city blocks." Matthew Strauss described it as "hour-long, uninterrupted piece" that "blends elements of jazz, indie rock, soul, funk, and hip-hop, tossing in poetry, mock radio broadcasts, a lot of samples, and plenty of distortion."

Pitchfork included the music video for “SahBabii /\ Now, Nation End, 38:15” on their list of The Best Music Videos of 2018.

== Track listing ==
No.	Title	Length
1.	"Side X: The Landing; Sellin Soap; Pass Time; I Remember; Recitation #1, nate sees the storm; A Siren Reimagined (That Awful Sound Pt.II); Que Triste; Unhappy; Recitation #2, red burns comin!; Revelation, First Variation; Get It On !; Millyrock; Tricknology !; A Shame! aka Canned Pears; >:-)!; Tri ck nol o g y (written in white out)"	32:17
2.	"Side Y: Tribute For Malcolm (Allah); Today's Mathematics; Noise Complaint Skit; !Can I Kick It? wit Ah ah ah Brownie; Recitation #3, cleb sees the storm !; Tribute for Albert Ayler (Rejoice !); SahBabii / Now, Nation End; :'-( Recitation #4, what about the planet?; So I go bang bang and shoot; Wont U; Fiesta para San Lasaro Babalu; Recitation #5, the devil Meets Red Burns; Red Burns jumped the devil; Let Us Pray; U Remember; You Purified Me caveman; MIKE Sees The Storm; Take the 'C' Train; A Moment of Silence For You Bichass niggas"	30:39
