= Total Package Tour =

2017 concert tour

The Total Package Tour
- Tour by New Kids on the Block, Paula Abdul and Boyz II Men
- Promotional poster for the tour
- Associated album: Thankful
- Start date: May 12, 2017
- End date: July 16, 2017
- Legs: 1
- No. of shows: 47
- Box office: $37,814,743 ($48.5 million in 2024 dollars)
New Kids on the Block tour chronology
The Main Event (2015)	Total Package Tour (2017)	Mixtape Tour (2019)
Paula Abdul tour chronology
Under My Spell Tour (1991–92)	Total Package Tour (2017)	Straight Up Paula! (2018–19)
Boyz II Men tour chronology
The Package Tour (2013)	Total Package Tour (2017)

The Total Package Tour was a co-headlining concert tour featuring American bands New Kids on the Block, Boyz II Men and American singer Paula Abdul. It began on May 12, 2017. in Columbus, Ohio and concluded on July 16, 2017, in Hollywood, Florida This was the second joint tour between New Kids on the Block and Boyz II Men (after The Package Tour four years prior), and Abdul's first tour in twenty-five years.

== Background ==
In November 2016, New Kids on the Block, Boyz II Men, and Abdul appeared on the Today Show to announce that they would be going on tour together in summer 2017.

== Setlists ==
Paula Abdul

1. "(It's Just) The Way That You Love Me"
2. "Cold Hearted"
3. "Opposites Attract" (with "Singin' in the Rain" by Gene Kelly intro)
4. "Rush Rush" (with "The Promise of a New Day" intro)
5. "Straight Up"
6. "Forever Your Girl"
Boyz II Men

1. "Motownphilly"
2. "On Bended Knee"
3. "It's So Hard to Say Goodbye to Yesterday"
4. "Water Runs Dry"
5. "Are You Gonna Go My Way"/"American Woman"/"Locked Out of Heaven" (Lenny Kravitz/The Guess Who/Bruno Mars covers)
6. "I'll Make Love to You"
7. "End of the Road"
8. "In the Still of the Night" (snippet)
9. "A Song for Momma" (snippet)
10. "One Sweet Day"
11. "End of the Road"
New Kids on the Block

1. "One More Night"
2. "My Favorite Girl"
3. "Dirty Dancing"
4. "You Got It (The Right Stuff)"
5. "Remix (I Like The)"
6. "Block Party"
7. "Tonight"
8. "Summertime"
9. "Games"
10. "Cover Girl"
11. "The Whisper"
12. "Stop It Girl"
13. "Popsicle"
14. "Be My Girl"
15. "I Wanna Be Loved by You"
16. "Didn't I (Blow Your Mind This Time)" (The Delfonics cover)
17. "Call It What You Want"
18. "Valentine Girl"
19. "Happy Birthday"
20. "You Got the Flavor"
21. "Dirty Dawg"
22. "Never Let You Go"
23. "If You Go Away"
24. "Merry, Merry Christmas"
25. "This One's for the Children"
26. "Still Sounds Good"
27. "Hard (Not Lovin' U)"
28. "Single"
29. "Please Don't Go Girl"
30. "Step by Step"
31. "I'll Be Loving You (Forever)"
32. "Hangin' Tough"

== Tour dates ==
Date	City	Country	Venue	Attendance	Gross revenue
North America
May 12, 2017	Columbus	United States	Schottenstein Center	12,421 / 13,358 (93%)	$904,358
May 13, 2017	Grand Rapids	United States	Van Andel Arena	9,516 / 10,246 (93%)	$657,323
May 16, 2017	Cincinnati	United States	U.S. Bank Arena	9,949 / 10,805 (92%)	$634,974
May 17, 2017	Nashville	United States	Bridgestone Arena	13,355 / 13,355 (100%)	$779,154
May 19, 2017	New Orleans	United States	Smoothie King Center	11,270 / 12,147 (93%)	$743,898
May 20, 2017	Houston	United States	Toyota Center	11,487 / 11,487 (100%)	$1,044,002
May 21, 2017	Austin	United States	Frank Erwin Center	10,691 / 10,691 (100%)	$946,667
May 23, 2017	Dallas	United States	American Airlines Center	12,911 / 13,687 (94%)	$921,200
May 24, 2017	Tulsa	United States	BOK Center	8,664 / 9,909 (87%)	$577,903
May 26, 2017	Phoenix	United States	Talking Stick Resort Arena	11,871 / 11,871 (100%)	$818,243
May 28, 2017	Las Vegas	United States	T-Mobile Arena	7,963 / 8,988 (89%)	$607,971
May 31, 2017	Fresno	United States	Save Mart Center	9,307 / 11,241 (83%)	$562,779
June 1, 2017	San Diego	United States	Viejas Arena	9,016 / 9,464 (95%)	$684,699
June 2, 2017	Los Angeles	United States	Hollywood Bowl	16,183 / 17,672 (92%)	$1,365,634
June 3, 2017	Sacramento	United States	Golden 1 Center	12,882 / 14,095 (91%)	$1,047,501
June 4, 2017	San Jose	United States	SAP Center	11,502 / 12,442 (92%)	$882,569
June 6, 2017	Portland	United States	Moda Center	11,481 / 11,481 (100%)	$846,996
June 7, 2017	Seattle	United States	KeyArena	11,010 / 11,906 (92%)	$811,606
June 9, 2017	West Valley City	United States	Maverik Center	8,587 / 9,620 (89%)	$418,889
June 10, 2017	Denver	United States	Pepsi Center	11,511 / 13,647 (84%)	$834,218
June 11, 2017	Omaha	United States	CenturyLink Center Omaha	9,238 / 11,281 (82%)	$648,459
June 12, 2017	Kansas City	United States	Sprint Center	9,257 / 11,370 (81%)	$702,583
June 14, 2017	Saint Paul	United States	Xcel Energy Center	11,384 / 13,475 (84%)	$834,530
June 15, 2017	Rosemont	United States	Allstate Arena	22,332 / 25,642 (87%)	$1,796,102
June 16, 2017	Rosemont	United States	Allstate Arena	22,332 / 25,642 (87%)	$1,796,102
June 17, 2017	St. Louis	United States	Scottrade Center	10,589 / 12,228 (87%)	$805,584
June 18, 2017	Indianapolis	United States	Bankers Life Fieldhouse	8,666 / 10,636 (81%)	$539,419
June 20, 2017	Toronto	Canada	Air Canada Centre	21,891 / 26,459 (83%)	$1,375,320
June 21, 2017	Toronto	Canada	Air Canada Centre	21,891 / 26,459 (83%)	$1,375,320
June 23, 2017	Buffalo	United States	KeyBank Center	11,049 / 13,214 (84%)	$703,867
June 24, 2017	Philadelphia	United States	Wells Fargo Center	13,068 / 13,730 (95%)	$1,115,756
June 25, 2017	Washington, D.C.	United States	Verizon Center	12,243 / 13,945 (88%)	$942,406
June 27, 2017	Brooklyn	United States	Barclays Center	10,954 / 13,340 (82%)	$818,138
June 29, 2017	Auburn Hills	United States	The Palace of Auburn Hills	11,428 / 12,882 (89%)	$946,819
June 30, 2017	Cleveland	United States	Quicken Loans Arena	12,384 / 14,155 (87%)	$913,666
July 1, 2017	Pittsburgh	United States	PPG Paints Arena	12,174 / 13,352 (91%)	$806,401
July 2, 2017	Newark	United States	Prudential Center	10,790 / 12,599 (86%)	$792,317
July 5, 2017	Allentown	United States	PPL Center	7,525 / 8,556 (88%)	$470,359
July 6, 2017	Uncasville	United States	Mohegan Sun Arena	6,987 / 7,188 (97%)	$553,157
July 7, 2017	Uniondale	United States	Nassau Veterans Memorial Coliseum	9,724 / 11,037 (88%)	$865,463
July 8, 2017	Boston	United States	Fenway Park	34,519 / 34,519 (100%)	$2,886,861
July 9, 2017	Albany	United States	Times Union Center	9,272 / 11,496 (81%)	$557,214
July 11, 2017	Raleigh	United States	PNC Arena	12,026 / 13,592 (88%)	$787,360
July 13, 2017	Charlotte	United States	Spectrum Center	12,352 / 13,530 (91%)	$851,690
July 14, 2017	Duluth	United States	Infinite Energy Arena	9,770 / 11,008 (89%)	$1,080,777
July 15, 2017	Tampa	United States	Amalie Arena	14,045 / 14,045 (100%)	$992,836
July 16, 2017	Hollywood	United States	Hard Rock Live	5,385 / 5,385 (100%)	$521,813
Total				530,629 / 586,776 (90%)	$39,399,481
