= The Magic Summer Tour (2024) =

2024 concert tour by New Kids on the Block

Magic Summer 2024 Tour
- Tour by New Kids on the Block, Paula Abdul & DJ Jazzy Jeff
- Promotional poster for the tour
- Location: North America
- Associated album: Still Kids
- Start date: June 14, 2024
- End date: August 25, 2024
- Legs: 1
- No. of shows: 47

New Kids on the Block, Paula Abdul & DJ Jazzy Jeff concert chronology
- Mixtape Tour (2022); Magic Summer 2024 Tour (2024)

The Magic Summer 2024 Tour was the eighth headlining concert tour by American boy band New Kids on the Block. Their first headlining tour in ten years, it is in support of their eighth studio album Still Kids (2024). The tour began on June 14, 2024, in Cuyahoga Falls, Ohio and finished on August 25, in Noblesville, Indiana. This is their second tour that has the same name as one of their previous tours.

== Background ==
New Kids on the Block appeared on Good Morning America on March 5, 2024, to announce their new album and tour. The band said that they decided to use the name Magic Summer Tour to redeem themselves for their performances during their 1990 tour of the same name. The band's singer Danny Wood said, "I want to make the Magic Summer Tour our best tour instead of our worst." Wood also stated that he felt like the band was "going through the motions" in their 1990 tour, and that they wanted to reconnect with their audience.

== Critical reception ==
Jim Harrington of The Mercury News attended the Mountain View show, and mentioned how Donnie Wahlberg took much of the lead during the show saying, "Wahlberg's big personality – which towers over his actual singing and dancing talent – turned out to be the best part of the night."

== Opening acts ==
- Paula Abdul
- DJ Jazzy Jeff

== Setlist ==
This set list is representative of the June 14, 2024, show in Cuyahoga Falls, OH. It is not intended to represent all concerts for the duration of the tour.

1. "Magic"
2. "Summer Love"
3. "My Favorite Girl"
4. "Cover Girl"
5. "Dirty Dancing"
6. "Summertime"
7. "You Got It (The Right Stuff)"
8. "Remix (I Like The)"
9. "Block Party"
10. "Tonight"
11. "Where Do I Go From Here"
12. "Treat Me Right"
13. "Call It What You Want"
14. "Popsicle" / "Games" (contains elements of "This Is How We Do It")
15. "Stay With Me Baby"
16. "Baby, I Believe in You"
17. "Never Gonna Fall In Love Again" (contains elements of "Paradise City")
18. "Happy Birthday"
19. "Didn't I (Blow Your Mind This Time)" / "Valentine Girl"
20. "Please Don't Go Girl"
21. "Get Down" (with DJ Jazzy Jeff)
22. Medley: "Dance With You" / "Pop" / "A Love Like This" / "In The Night" / "Long Time Coming"
23. "Kids"
24. "I'll Be Loving You (Forever)"

Encore

25. "Step by Step"
26. "Hangin' Tough" (contains elements of "We Will Rock You")
27. "Better Days"

== Tour dates ==
Date	City	Country	Venue	Opening acts
North America
June 14, 2024	Cuyahoga Falls	United States	Blossom Music Center	DJ Jazzy Jeff
June 15, 2024	Tinley Park	United States	Credit Union 1 Amphitheatre	DJ Jazzy Jeff
June 18, 2024	Clarkston	United States	Pine Knob Music Theatre	Paula Abdul; DJ Jazzy Jeff
June 19, 2024	Burgettstown	United States	The Pavilion at Star Lake	Paula Abdul; DJ Jazzy Jeff
June 21, 2024	Cincinnati	United States	Riverbend Music Center	Paula Abdul; DJ Jazzy Jeff
June 22, 2024	Maryland Heights	United States	Hollywood Casino Amphitheatre	Paula Abdul; DJ Jazzy Jeff
June 23, 2024	Prior Lake	United States	Mystic Amphitheater	Paula Abdul; DJ Jazzy Jeff
June 25, 2024	Kansas City	United States	Starlight Theatre	Paula Abdul; DJ Jazzy Jeff
June 26, 2024	Rogers	United States	Walmart Arkansas Music Pavilion	Paula Abdul; DJ Jazzy Jeff
June 28, 2024	Denver	United States	Ball Arena	Paula Abdul; DJ Jazzy Jeff
June 29, 2024	West Valley City	United States	Utah First Credit Union Amphitheatre	Paula Abdul; DJ Jazzy Jeff
July 1, 2024	Highland	United States	Yaamava' Theater	—
July 2, 2024	Wheatland	United States	Toyota Amphitheatre	Paula Abdul; DJ Jazzy Jeff
July 3, 2024	Mountain View	United States	Shoreline Amphitheatre	Paula Abdul; DJ Jazzy Jeff
July 5, 2024	Inglewood	United States	Kia Forum	Paula Abdul; DJ Jazzy Jeff
July 6, 2024	Palm Desert	United States	Acrisure Arena	Paula Abdul; DJ Jazzy Jeff
July 7, 2024	Chula Vista	United States	North Island Credit Union Amphitheatre	Paula Abdul; DJ Jazzy Jeff
July 9, 2024	Phoenix	United States	Talking Stick Resort Amphitheatre	Paula Abdul; DJ Jazzy Jeff
July 10, 2024	Albuquerque	United States	Isleta Amphitheater	Paula Abdul; DJ Jazzy Jeff
July 12, 2024	Austin	United States	Germania Insurance Amphitheater	Paula Abdul; DJ Jazzy Jeff
July 13, 2024	The Woodlands	United States	Cynthia Woods Mitchell Pavilion	Paula Abdul; DJ Jazzy Jeff
July 14, 2024	Dallas	United States	Dos Equis Pavilion	Paula Abdul; DJ Jazzy Jeff
July 16, 2024	Franklin	United States	FirstBank Amphitheater	Paula Abdul; DJ Jazzy Jeff
July 17, 2024	Franklin	United States	FirstBank Amphitheater	Paula Abdul; DJ Jazzy Jeff
July 19, 2024	Tampa	United States	MidFlorida Credit Union Amphitheatre	Paula Abdul; DJ Jazzy Jeff
July 20, 2024	West Palm Beach	United States	iTHINK Financial Amphitheatre	Paula Abdul; DJ Jazzy Jeff
July 21, 2024	Jacksonville	United States	Daily's Place	Paula Abdul; DJ Jazzy Jeff
July 25, 2024	Charleston	United States	Credit One Stadium	Paula Abdul; DJ Jazzy Jeff
July 26, 2024	Alpharetta	United States	Ameris Bank Amphitheatre	Paula Abdul; DJ Jazzy Jeff
July 27, 2024	Charlotte	United States	PNC Music Pavilion	Paula Abdul; DJ Jazzy Jeff
July 28, 2024	Raleigh	United States	Coastal Credit Union Music Park	Paula Abdul; DJ Jazzy Jeff
August 1, 2024	Virginia Beach	United States	Veterans United Home Loans Amphitheater	Paula Abdul; DJ Jazzy Jeff
August 2, 2024	Hartford	United States	Xfinity Theatre	Paula Abdul; DJ Jazzy Jeff
August 3, 2024	Hershey	United States	Hersheypark Stadium	Paula Abdul; DJ Jazzy Jeff
August 4, 2024	Wantagh	United States	Jones Beach Theatre	Paula Abdul; DJ Jazzy Jeff
August 8, 2024	Holmdel	United States	PNC Bank Arts Center	Paula Abdul; DJ Jazzy Jeff
August 9, 2024	Gilford	United States	BankNH Pavilion	Paula Abdul; DJ Jazzy Jeff
August 10, 2024	Mansfield	United States	Xfinity Center	Paula Abdul; DJ Jazzy Jeff
August 11, 2024	Saratoga Springs	United States	Saratoga Performing Arts Center	Paula Abdul; DJ Jazzy Jeff
August 15, 2024	Philadelphia	United States	TD Pavilion at the Mann	Paula Abdul; DJ Jazzy Jeff
August 16, 2024	Columbia	United States	Merriweather Post Pavilion	Paula Abdul; DJ Jazzy Jeff
August 17, 2024	Toronto	Canada	Budweiser Stage	Paula Abdul; DJ Jazzy Jeff
August 18, 2024	Toronto	Canada	Budweiser Stage	Paula Abdul; DJ Jazzy Jeff
August 22, 2024	Darien Lake	United States	Darien Lake Performing Arts Center	Paula Abdul; DJ Jazzy Jeff
August 23, 2024	Columbus	United States	Nationwide Arena	Paula Abdul; DJ Jazzy Jeff
August 24, 2024	Milwaukee	United States	American Family Insurance Amphitheater	Paula Abdul; DJ Jazzy Jeff
August 25, 2024	Noblesville	United States	Ruoff Music Center	Paula Abdul; DJ Jazzy Jeff

== Notes ==
- Paula Abdul was unable to perform in Cuyahoga Falls and Tinley Park due to "Production Issues".
- Starting with the show in Illinois, "Pop" was removed from the new album medley set.
