= The Main Event (2015 concert tour) =

2015 concert tour by New Kids on the Block

- Tour by New Kids on the Block
- Promotional poster for the tour
- Location: North America
- Start date: May 1, 2015
- End date: July 2, 2015
- Legs: 1
- No. of shows: 47
- Box office: $26.1 million
New Kids on the Block tour chronology
The Package Tour (2013)	The Main Event (2015)	Total Package Tour (2017)

The Main Event was a co-headlining concert tour from American boy band New Kids on the Block with special guests TLC, and Nelly. The tour began on May 1, 2015, in Las Vegas, and finished on July 2, 2015, in Buffalo, New York. It included close to fifty dates across North America. It was the thirty-eighth ranked North American tour of 2015, grossing $26.1 million.

== Background ==
In January 2015, New Kids on the Block appeared on Good Morning America to announce the tour. It had been hinted that the band might collaborate with TLC and Nelly while on the road. For the show's production there would be "new and top notch production elements", and a 360 degree stage. TLC was excited about the tour and said, "We are thrilled to be able to join pop icons NKOTB and Nelly on tour. We are equally excited to back on the road connecting with our fans in such huge arenas."

== Concert synopsis ==
The concert began with Nelly performing a few of his songs, followed by TLC's set, which was approximately 40 minutes long. Then there was a ten-minute break before New Kids on the Block took the stage. Going with the theme of the tour, the band dramatically entered the stage looking "like prizefighters entering a ring," "wearing modern leather ensembles" and opening their set with a new song. "1989" would appear in a wedding-invitation style font on the screen whenever a classic New Kids song was performed. Fans could see the band during the costume changes that were captured on the "Quick Change Cam."

The show was filled with production and choreography for every song, including streamer cannons, confetti shooting high into the air, and heart-shaped balloons. The band started the show with two new songs. Other songs performed were "Block Party", "10", "Crash", "Step by Step" and "My Favorite Girl". There were solo sections during the show, such as Jordan Knight on his solo hit "Give It to You", Joey McIntyre on "Twisted", and Donnie Wahlberg on "I Need You".

== Setlists ==
Nelly
1. "E.I."
2. "Air Force Ones"
3. "Country Grammar (Hot Shit)"
4. "Just A Dream"
5. "Ride wit Me"
6. "Hot in Herre"
TLC
1. "What About Your Friends"
2. "Ain't 2 Proud 2 Beg"
3. "Baby-Baby-Baby"
4. "Creep"
5. "Diggin' on You"
6. "Unpretty"
7. "Red Light Special"
8. "No Scrubs"
9. "Meant To Be"
10. "Waterfalls"
New Kids on the Block
1. "Block Party"
2. "Crash"
3. "My Favorite Girl"
4. "You Got It (The Right Stuff)"
5. "The Whisper"/"Single"/"Shout"
6. "Let's Try It Again"
7. "We Own Tonight"
8. "Didn't I (Blow Your Mind This Time)"/"Valentine Girl"/"If You Go Away"/"Never Can Say Goodbye" /"Please Don't Go Girl"
9. "Remix (I Like The)"
10. "Summertime"
11. "Dirty Dancing"
12. "One Song"
13. "Tonight"
14. "Baby, I Believe in You"/"Give It to You" (Jordan Solo)
15. "Sweet Dreams (Are Made of This)/"Twisted" (Eurythmics cover)(Joey solo)
16. "I Need You"/"Lean on Me" (Bill Withers cover) / "Cover Girl" (Donnie Solo)"`
17. "Games"
18. "Step by Step"
19. "I'll Be Loving You (Forever)"
20. "Hangin' Tough" / "We Will Rock You" (Queen) cover

== Tour dates ==
Date	City	Country	Venue
North America
May 1, 2015	Las Vegas	United States	Mandalay Bay Events Center
May 2, 2015	Anaheim	United States	Honda Center
May 3, 2015	San Jose	United States	SAP Center
May 5, 2015	Vancouver	Canada	Rogers Arena
May 6, 2015	Tacoma	United States	Tacoma Dome
May 8, 2015	San Jose	United States	SAP Center
May 9, 2015	Inglewood	United States	The Forum
May 11, 2015	San Diego	United States	Viejas Arena
May 12, 2015	Glendale	United States	Gila River Arena
May 14, 2015	Dallas	United States	American Airlines Center
May 15, 2015	New Orleans	United States	Smoothie King Center
May 16, 2015	Houston	United States	Toyota Center
May 18, 2015	Oklahoma City	United States	Chesapeake Energy Arena
May 19, 2015	Kansas City	United States	Sprint Center
May 20, 2015	Saint Paul	United States	Xcel Energy Center
May 22, 2015	St. Louis	United States	Scottrade Center
May 23, 2015	Rosemont	United States	Allstate Arena
May 24, 2015	Rosemont	United States	Allstate Arena
May 26, 2015	Cincinnati	United States	U.S. Bank Arena
May 27, 2015	Nashville	United States	Bridgestone Arena
May 29, 2015	Auburn Hills	United States	The Palace of Auburn Hills
May 30, 2015	Grand Rapids	United States	Van Andel Arena
May 31, 2015	Indianapolis	United States	Bankers Life Fieldhouse
June 2, 2015	Charlotte	United States	Time Warner Cable Arena
June 4, 2015	Sunrise	United States	BB&T Center
June 5, 2015	Orlando	United States	Amway Center
June 6, 2015	Atlanta	United States	Philips Arena
June 7, 2015	Louisville	United States	KFC Yum! Center
June 9, 2015	Norfolk	United States	Norfolk Scope
June 10, 2015	Washington, D.C.	United States	Verizon Center
June 11, 2015	Bethlehem	United States	Sands Bethlehem Events Center
June 12, 2015	Uncasville	United States	Mohegan Sun Arena
June 13, 2015	Bethlehem	United States	Sands Bethlehem Events Center
June 14, 2015	Pittsburgh	United States	Consol Energy Center
June 16, 2015	Columbus	United States	Nationwide Arena
June 17, 2015	Cleveland	United States	Quicken Loans Arena
June 19, 2015	Philadelphia	United States	Wells Fargo Center
June 20, 2015	Uniondale	United States	Nassau Veterans Memorial Coliseum
June 21, 2015	New York City	United States	Madison Square Garden
June 22, 2015	New York City	United States	Madison Square Garden
June 24, 2015	Boston	United States	TD Garden
June 25, 2015	Boston	United States	TD Garden
June 27, 2015	Hershey	United States	Hershey Park Stadium
June 28, 2015	Toronto	Canada	Air Canada Centre
June 29, 2015	Toronto	Canada	Air Canada Centre
June 30, 2015	Montreal	Canada	Bell Centre
July 2, 2015	Buffalo	United States	First Niagara Center

== Critical reception ==
Kelli Skye of the Orange County Register said that the show "was a grand spectacle done in the round so guests could get a 360-degree view of all of the on state action... [they] made sure that every section of the venue got a little love." Beth Spotswood from SF Gate stated that the New Kids "appeared older, more embarrassing in concert." Spotswood was ready to go home once McIntyre went out on stage wearing nothing but white jeans. On opening act Nelly, she said, "it was a bit sad to see the rapper hit the stage to perform for a bunch of moms at 7:20 p.m. on a Sunday evening." McIntyre would occasionally thank "the audience for sticking by NKOTB."
