= Hangin' Tough Tour =

1988 concert tour by New Kids on the Block

- Tour by New Kids on the Block
- Cover of the VHS release
- Associated album: Hangin' Tough
- Start date: April 29, 1988
- End date: March 26, 1990

New Kids on the Block concert chronology
- Hangin' Tough Tour (1988–90); The Magic Summer Tour (1990–92)

The Hangin' Tough Tour was a concert tour of the boy band New Kids on the Block, launched to support their album Hangin' Tough.

== Background ==
Since the 1988 release of Hangin' Tough, the New Kids had performed as the opening act for fellow teen pop singer Tiffany's successful North American tour. Due to a sudden rise of the group's popularity, Tiffany wound up opening for them on this tour, but they were credited as co-headliners.

== Recordings ==
The group's June 5 concert at the Mayan Theater was filmed and released as Hangin' Tough- Live. The Home video was certified 12× platinum by RIAA for selling over 1.2 million copies in United States.

== Setlist ==
- "My Favorite Girl"
- "What'cha Gonna Do (About It)"
- "Please Don't Go Girl"
- "Cover Girl"
- "You Got It (The Right Stuff)"
- "I'll Be Loving You (Forever)"
- "Hangin' Tough"

== Tour dates ==
Date	City	Country	Venue	Act(s)
April 29, 1988	Westbury	United States	Westbury Music Fair	New Kids on the Block, VHF, Tiffany
April 30, 1988	Valley Forge	United States	Valley Forge Music Fair	New Kids on the Block, Tiffany
June 5, 1988	Los Angeles	United States	Mayan Theater	New Kids on the Block, Tiffany
June 18, 1988	Boston	United States	Boston Common	New Kids on the Block, Tiffany
July 20, 1988	Mason	United States	Timberwolf Amphitheatre	New Kids on the Block, Tiffany
July 23, 1988	St. Louis	United States	St. Louis Arena	New Kids on the Block, Tiffany
July 24, 1988	Indianapolis	United States	Indiana State Fair	New Kids on the Block, Tiffany
July 28, 1988	Vaughan	Canada	Kingswood Music Theatre	New Kids on the Block, Tiffany
July 29, 1988	Clarkston	United States	Pine Knob Music Theater	New Kids on the Block, Tiffany
July 30, 1988	Hoffman Estates	United States	Poplar Creek Music Theater	New Kids on the Block, Tiffany
August 6, 1988	Houston	United States	Arena Theatre	New Kids on the Block, Tiffany
August 9, 1988	Austell	United States	Six Flags Over Georgia	New Kids on the Block, Tiffany
August 11, 1988	Hollywood	United States	Six Flags Atlantis	New Kids on the Block, Tiffany
August 30, 1988	Mansfield	United States	Great Woods Center for the Performing Arts	New Kids on the Block, Tiffany
September 3, 1988	Wantagh	United States	Jones Beach Theater	
September 30, 1988	New York City	United States	1018 Club	
October 20, 1988	San Francisco	United States	Oasis	
November 21, 1988	Boston	United States	Boston Garden	
December 3, 1988	New York City	United States	Emerald City	
December 3, 1988	Philadelphia	United States	Theatre of Living Arts	
December 14, 1988	San Francisco	United States	Warfield Theatre	
December 16, 1988	New York City	United States	Emerald City	
February 19, 1989	Pittsburgh	United States	Metropol	
March 18, 1989	Santa Clarita	United States	Six Flags Magic Mountain	
April 21, 1989	Hagerstown	United States	Hagerstown Fairgrounds	
May 27, 1989	Landover	United States	Capital Centre	
May 29, 1989	Pittsburgh	United States	Civic Arena	
June 3, 1989	Phoenix	United States	Celebrity Theatre	
June 24, 1989	Santa Clara	United States	Redwood Amphitheater	
July 1, 1989	Dallas	United States	Coca-Cola Starplex Amphitheatre	New Kids on the Block, Tiffany, Tommy Page
July 2, 1989	Houston	United States	Southern Star Amphitheatre	New Kids on the Block, Tiffany, Tommy Page
July 15, 1989	White Plains	United States	Westchester County Center	New Kids on the Block, Tiffany, Tommy Page
July 21, 1989	Clarkston	United States	Pine Knob Music Theatre	New Kids on the Block, Tiffany, Tommy Page
July 22, 1989	Eureka	United States	Old Glory Amphitheater	New Kids on the Block, Tiffany, Tommy Page
July 29, 1989	Columbia	United States	Merriweather Post Pavilion	New Kids on the Block, Tiffany, Tommy Page
August 4, 1989	Columbus	United States	Ohio Expo Center and State Fairgrounds	New Kids on the Block, Tiffany, Tommy Page
August 5, 1989	Mountain View	United States	Shoreline Amphitheatre	New Kids on the Block, Tiffany, Tommy Page
August 9, 1989	Mansfield	United States	Great Woods Center for the Performing Arts	New Kids on the Block, Tiffany, Tommy Page
August 12, 1989	Vaughan	Canada	Kingswood Music Theatre	New Kids on the Block, Tiffany, Tommy Page
August 13, 1989	Bristol	United States	Lake Compounce Amphitheatre	New Kids on the Block, Tiffany, Tommy Page
August 14, 1989	Atlantic City	United States	Bally's Grand	New Kids on the Block, Tiffany, Tommy Page
August 15, 1989	Hyannis	United States	Cape Cod Melody Tent	New Kids on the Block, Tiffany, Tommy Page
August 25, 1989	Indianapolis	United States	Indiana State Fair	New Kids on the Block, Tiffany, Tommy Page
August 26, 1989	Louisville	United States	Cardinal Stadium	New Kids on the Block, Tiffany, Tommy Page
September 1, 1989	Falcon Heights	United States	Minnesota State Fair	New Kids on the Block, Tiffany, Tommy Page
September 14, 1989	York	United States	York Fair	New Kids on the Block, Tiffany, Tommy Page
September 15, 1989	Uniondale	United States	Nassau Coliseum	
November 9, 1989	Buffalo	United States	Buffalo Memorial Auditorium	New Kids on the Block, Dino, Sweet Sensation
November 11, 1989	Troy	United States	Houston Field House	New Kids on the Block, Dino, Sweet Sensation
November 12, 1989	East Rutherford	United States	Brendan Byrne Arena	New Kids on the Block, Dino, Sweet Sensation
November 13, 1989	East Rutherford	United States	Brendan Byrne Arena	New Kids on the Block, Dino, Sweet Sensation
November 16, 1989	Atlanta	United States	Omni Coliseum	New Kids on the Block, Dino, Sweet Sensation
November 17, 1989	Atlanta	United States	Omni Coliseum	New Kids on the Block, Dino, Sweet Sensation
November 18, 1989	Cincinnati	United States	Riverfront Coliseum	New Kids on the Block, Dino, Sweet Sensation
November 19, 1989	Richfield	United States	Richfield Coliseum	New Kids on the Block, Dino, Sweet Sensation
November 22, 1989	New Haven	United States	New Haven Coliseum	New Kids on the Block, Dino, Sweet Sensation
November 23, 1989	New York City	United States	Madison Square Garden	New Kids on the Block, Dino, Sweet Sensation
November 24, 1989	Hershey	United States	Hersheypark Arena	New Kids on the Block, Dino, Sweet Sensation
November 25, 1989	Boston	United States	Boston Garden	New Kids on the Block, Dino, Sweet Sensation
November 26, 1989	Philadelphia	United States	Spectrum	New Kids on the Block, Dino, Sweet Sensation
November 30, 1989	Rosemont	United States	Rosemont Horizon	New Kids on the Block, Dino, Sweet Sensation
December 2, 1989	Auburn Hills	United States	The Palace of Auburn Hills	New Kids on the Block, Dino, The Cover Girls
December 3, 1989	Pittsburgh	United States	Civic Arena	New Kids on the Block, Dino, The Cover Girls
December 4, 1989	Pittsburgh	United States	Civic Arena	New Kids on the Block, Dino, The Cover Girls
December 7, 1989	Houston	United States	The Summit	New Kids on the Block, Dino, The Cover Girls
December 10, 1989	Dallas	United States	Reunion Arena	New Kids on the Block, Dino, The Cover Girls
December 16, 1989	Inglewood	United States	Great Western Forum	New Kids on the Block, Dino, The Cover Girls
December 17, 1989	Inglewood	United States	Great Western Forum	New Kids on the Block, Dino, The Cover Girls
December 19, 1989	Oakland	United States	Oakland-Alameda County Coliseum Arena	New Kids on the Block, Dino, The Cover Girls
December 20, 1989	Sacramento	United States	ARCO Arena	New Kids on the Block, Dino, The Cover Girls
December 21, 1989	Oakland	United States	Oakland-Alameda County Coliseum Arena	New Kids on the Block, Dino, The Cover Girls
December 22, 1989	Sacramento	United States	ARCO Arena	New Kids on the Block, Dino, The Cover Girls
December 30, 1989	New Haven	United States	New Haven Coliseum	New Kids on the Block, Dino, The Cover Girls
December 31, 1989	Worcester	United States	Centrum in Worcester	New Kids on the Block, Dino, The Cover Girls
January 5, 1990	Charlotte	United States	Charlotte Coliseum	New Kids on the Block, Dino, The Cover Girls
January 7, 1990	Landover	United States	Capital Centre	New Kids on the Block, Dino, The Cover Girls
January 8, 1990	Landover	United States	Capital Centre	New Kids on the Block, Dino, The Cover Girls
January 10, 1990	Milwaukee	United States	Bradley Center	New Kids on the Block, Dino, The Cover Girls
January 11, 1990	Auburn Hills	United States	The Palace of Auburn Hills	New Kids on the Block, Dino, The Cover Girls
January 12, 1990	Rosemont	United States	Rosemont Horizon	New Kids on the Block, Dino, The Cover Girls
January 14, 1990	Indianapolis	United States	Market Square Arena	New Kids on the Block, Dino, The Cover Girls
January 16, 1990	Bloomington	United States	Met Center	New Kids on the Block, Dino, The Cover Girls
January 18, 1990	Kansas City	United States	Kemper Arena	New Kids on the Block, Dino, The Cover Girls
January 28, 1990	St. Louis	United States	St. Louis Arena	New Kids on the Block, Dino, The Cover Girls
January 30, 1990	Bloomington	United States	Met Center	New Kids on the Block, Dino, The Cover Girls
February 6, 1990	Austin	United States	Frank Erwin Center	New Kids on the Block, Dino, The Cover Girls
February 11, 1990	Dallas	United States	Reunion Arena	New Kids on the Block, Dino, The Cover Girls
February 20, 1990	Miami	United States	Miami Arena	New Kids on the Block, Dino, Sweet Sensation
February 23, 1990	Tampa	United States	USF Sun Dome	New Kids on the Block, Dino, Sweet Sensation
March 1, 1990	Chapel Hill	United States	Dean Smith Center	New Kids on the Block, Dino, Sweet Sensation
March 2, 1990	Jacksonville	United States	Jacksonville Memorial Coliseum	New Kids on the Block, Dino, Sweet Sensation
March 3, 1990	Atlanta	United States	Omni Coliseum	New Kids on the Block, Dino, Sweet Sensation
March 15, 1990	Uniondale	United States	Nassau Coliseum	New Kids on the Block, Perfect Gentlemen, Sweet Sensation
March 16, 1990	Uniondale	United States	Nassau Coliseum	New Kids on the Block, Perfect Gentlemen, Sweet Sensation
March 18, 1990	Toronto	Canada	Maple Leaf Gardens	New Kids on the Block, Perfect Gentlemen, Sweet Sensation
March 22, 1990	Quebec City	Canada	Colisée de Québec	New Kids on the Block, Perfect Gentlemen, Sweet Sensation
March 25, 1990	East Rutherford	United States	Brendan Byrne Arena	New Kids on the Block, Perfect Gentlemen, Sweet Sensation
March 26, 1990	East Rutherford	United States	Brendan Byrne Arena	New Kids on the Block, Perfect Gentlemen, Sweet Sensation

== Opening acts ==
- Tiffany (select dates)
- Tommy Page (select dates)
- Dino
- Sweet Sensation
- The Cover Girls
