= The Package Tour =

2013 concert tour

- Tour by New Kids on the Block, 98 Degrees and Boyz II Men
- Promotional image for tour
- Location: North America
- Associated albums: 10 (New Kids on the Block) & 2.0 (98 Degrees)
- Start date: May 28, 2013
- End date: August 4, 2013
- Legs: 1
- No. of shows: 49 in North America
- Website: Tour Website
New Kids on the Block tour chronology
| NKOTBSB Tour (2011–12) | The Package Tour (2013) | The Main Event (2015) |
98 Degrees tour chronology
| Revelation Tour (2001) | The Package Tour (2013) | My2K Tour (2016) |
Boyz II Men tour chronology
| Twenty Tour (2012) | The Package Tour (2013) | Total Package Tour (2017) |

The Package Tour was a co-headlining tour featuring American bands New Kids on the Block, 98 Degrees and Boyz II Men. Beginning May 2013, the groups performed nearly fifty shows in North America.

== Background ==
The tour was officially announced during a surprise appearance on The View. Boyz II Men and 98 Degrees performed a cappella versions of their classics. The double entendre name was created by Joey McIntyre. The trek is described as nostalgia trip for the fans. All three bands have expressed giving their loyal fans a show they've been waiting for. Unlike NKOTB's previous touring effort, all three bands will not perform as one. They will each perform their own section of a three-hour show. During an interview with Newsday, Donnie Wahlberg expressed the groups will sing their hits, alongside new material. He continued to say, "We’ll have plenty of surprises! With all those egos in one building at the same time! You know there's going to be a lot of crazy and fun stuff going on. We’re gonna pull out a lot of surprises every night. We’re going to try and pull in as many special guests as we can, and do as many fun things as we can".

== Setlist ==
Boyz II Men
1. "On Bended Knee"
2. "Water Runs Dry"
3. "I'll Make Love to You"
4. "It's So Hard to Say Goodbye to Yesterday"
5. "End of the Road"
6. "Motownphilly"
98 Degrees
1. "Give Me Just One Night (Una Noche)"
2. "Girls Night Out"
3. "Invisible Man"
4. "The Hardest Thing"
5. "Ayo"
6. "My Everything"
7. "Can't Get Enough"
8. "I Do"
9. "Impossible Things"
10. "Because of You"
11. "Microphone"
New Kids on the Block
1. "We Own Tonight"
2. "Block Party"
3. "Summertime"
4. "You Got It (The Right Stuff)"
5. "The Whisper"
6. "Survive You"
7. "Didn't I (Blow Your Mind This Time)" / "Valentine Girl"
8. "If You Go Away"
9. "Please Don't Go Girl"
10. "Remix (I Like The)"
11. "Single"
12. Medley: "Baby, I Believe in You" / "I'll Be There" / "Tender Love" / "Click Click Click" / "Faith" / "Kiss" / "Hot In Herre" / "Dirty Dancing"
13. "Step By Step"
14. "Cover Girl"
15. "Games"
16. "Tonight"
17. "I'll Be Loving You (Forever)"
18. "Hangin’ Tough"

== Tour dates ==
| Date | City | Country | Venue |
North America
| May 28, 2013 | Uncasville | United States | Mohegan Sun Arena |
| May 29, 2013 | Uncasville | United States | Mohegan Sun Arena |
| May 31, 2013 | Uncasville | United States | Mohegan Sun Arena |
| June 1, 2013 | Uniondale | United States | Nassau Veterans Memorial Coliseum |
| June 2, 2013 | Boston | United States | TD Garden |
| June 3, 2013 | Boston | United States | TD Garden |
| June 5, 2013 | Ottawa | Canada | Scotiabank Place |
| June 6, 2013 | Montreal | Canada | Bell Centre |
| June 7, 2013 | Toronto | Canada | Air Canada Centre |
| June 8, 2013 | Auburn Hills | United States | The Palace of Auburn Hills |
| June 9, 2013 | Cleveland | United States | Quicken Loans Arena |
| June 11, 2013 | Pittsburgh | United States | Consol Energy Center |
| June 13, 2013 | East Rutherford | United States | Izod Center |
| June 14, 2013 | Washington, D.C. | United States | Verizon Center |
| June 15, 2013 | Philadelphia | United States | Wells Fargo Center |
| June 16, 2013 | Brooklyn | United States | Barclays Center |
| June 18, 2013 | Nashville | United States | Bridgestone Arena |
| June 19, 2013 | Charlotte | United States | Time Warner Cable Arena |
| June 20, 2013 | Atlanta | United States | Philips Arena |
| June 21, 2013 | Orlando | United States | Amway Center |
| June 22, 2013 | Sunrise | United States | BB&T Center |
| June 24, 2013 | Louisville | United States | KFC Yum! Center |
| June 25, 2013 | Cincinnati | United States | U.S. Bank Arena |
| June 27, 2013 | Houston | United States | Toyota Center |
| June 28, 2013 | Dallas | United States | American Airlines Center |
| June 29, 2013 | Oklahoma City | United States | Chesapeake Energy Arena |
| June 30, 2013 | St. Louis | United States | Scottrade Center |
| July 2, 2013^{[A]} | Milwaukee | United States | Marcus Amphitheater |
| July 5, 2013 | Los Angeles | United States | Staples Center |
| July 6, 2013 | Las Vegas | United States | Mandalay Bay Events Center |
| July 7, 2013 | San Jose | United States | SAP Center |
| July 9, 2013 | Tacoma | United States | Tacoma Dome |
| July 10, 2013 | Vancouver | Canada | Rogers Arena |
| July 12, 2013 | San Jose | United States | SAP Center |
| July 13, 2013 | Anaheim | United States | Honda Center |
| July 14, 2013 | Glendale | United States | Jobing.com Arena |
| July 16, 2013 | Broomfield | United States | 1stBank Center |
| July 18, 2013 | Rosemont | United States | Allstate Arena |
| July 19, 2013 | Rosemont | United States | Allstate Arena |
| July 20, 2013 | Minneapolis | United States | Target Center |
| July 21, 2013 | Kansas City | United States | Sprint Center |
| July 25, 2013 | Manchester | United States | Verizon Wireless Arena |
| July 26, 2013 | Atlantic City | United States | Etess Arena |
| July 27, 2013^{[B]} | Hershey | United States | Hersheypark Stadium |
| July 28, 2013 | Toronto | Canada | Air Canada Centre |
| August 1, 2013 | Albany | United States | Times Union Center |
| August 2, 2013 | Buffalo | United States | First Niagara Center |
| August 3, 2013 | Columbus | United States | Value City Arena |
| August 4, 2013 | Indianapolis | United States | Bankers Life Fieldhouse |

Festivals and other miscellaneous performances
^{A} This concert is a part of "Summerfest"
^{B} This concert is a part of the "Summer MixTape Festival"

Cancellations and rescheduled shows

| June 4, 2013 | Ottawa, Canada | Scotiabank Place | Rescheduled to June 5, 2013 |
| July 12, 2013 | Rosemont, Illinois | Allstate Arena | Rescheduled to July 19, 2013 |
| July 13, 2013 | Minneapolis, Minnesota | Target Center | Rescheduled to July 20, 2013 |

=== Box office score data ===
| Venue | City | Tickets sold / Available | Gross revenue |
|---|---|---|---|
| Mohegan Sun Arena | Uncasville | 13,590 / 14,127 (96%) | $937,748 |
| Nassau Veterans Memorial Coliseum | Uniondale | 12,208 / 12,208 (100%) | $881,507 |
| Bell Centre | Montreal | 6,533 / 7,871 (83%) | $491,856 |
| Air Canada Centre | Toronto | 24,859 / 24,859 (100%) | $1,575,180 |
| Izod Center | East Rutherford | 13,752 / 13,752 (100%) | $988,185 |
| Verizon Center | Washington, D.C. | 13,834 / 16,653 (83%) | $957,336 |
| Barclays Center | Brooklyn | 8,880 / 9,846 (90%) | $615,108 |
| Bridgestone Arena | Nashville | 12,275 / 12,275 (100%) | $764,679 |
| Philips Arena | Atlanta | 12,056 / 12,056 (100%) | $829,916 |
| Amway Center | Orlando | 12,169 / 12,505 (97%) | $736,150 |
| Staples Center | Los Angeles | 14,530 / 14,530 (100%) | $911,465 |
| Tacoma Dome | Tacoma | 10,006 / 10,006 (100%) | $614,539 |
| Target Center | Minneapolis | 13,376 / 13,376 (100%) | $803,701 |
| Times Union Center | Albany | 5,849 / 11,691 (50%) | $361,114 |
| TOTAL | | 203,917 / 215,755 (94%) | $20,468,484 |

== Critical response ==
The tour has received raved reviews from many music critics. Many have commented on the stage presence of the three acts and how well they connect with fans. Glenn Gamboa (Newsday) writes the bands proved they were the top touring act of the year. He continues, "They certainly didn’t skimp on the spectacle. What was more impressive, though, was the way they placed their music into the context of what has come before and after them". For the show in Montreal, Bernard Perusse (The Gazette) stated the concert was a night for nostalgia. He says, [The bands] were never anything less than consummately professional and highly energetic, delivering almost the entire set from a stage on the floor of the arena. Confetti, balloons, plumes of smoke and fire, lasers, hydraulic risers and other eye-popping extras punctuated the music". Nick Krewen (Toronto Star) gave the show at the Air Canada Centre four stars. He explained, "Almost more shocking is how seasoned NKOTB have become as performers. Aside from the usual bells and whistles like balloons, streamers, rising hydraulic platforms, open flames and lasers, the quintet offered the right balance of tease ’n’ please".
