= Doug Nichol =

American filmmaker and video director

Doug Nichol is an American filmmaker and commercials/music video director.

== Biography ==
A graduate of the USC School of Cinematic Arts, he started his career as a cinematographer working with David Bowie, Billy Joel, Bruce Springsteen and U2 and was director of photography on Madonna's Truth or Dare documentary. He has also directed campaigns for Levi's, Mercedes-Benz, Heineken, Virgin Mobile, Smirnoff, Toyota, Microsoft, Sony Ericsson, Peugeot, and American Express among others. His commercial for Levi's, involving a hamster, received the largest number of complaints to the Independent Television Commission at the time.

He won a Grammy Award for Best Long Form Music Video for Sting's Ten Summoner's Tales and also received two other Grammy nominations for work with Aerosmith and NKOTB. He has won several MTV awards including Best Rock Video for Aerosmith’s "Pink". His music video for "This Is Hardcore" by Pulp has consistently been listed as one of the top music videos of all time.

In 2016, he directed California Typewriter.

== Music videos ==
- Texas, "When We Are Together"
- Geri Halliwell, "Mi Chico Latino"
- Kula Shaker, "Mystical Machine Gun"
- Étienne Daho, "Ideal",
- Pulp, "This Is Hardcore"
- Étienne Daho, "Le Premier Jour"
- Aerosmith, "Pink"
- Shara Nelson, "Rough with the Smooth"
- Lenny Kravitz, "Spinning Round Over You"
- Jacques Dutronc & Étienne Daho, "Tous Les Gouts Sont Dans Ma Nature"
- Renaud, "C’est Quand Qu’On Va Ou"
- Des'ree, "I Ain't Movin'"
- Sting, "Seven Days"
- Sting, "Shape of My Heart"
- Extreme, "Stop the World"
- Del Amitri, "Be My Downfall"
- Chris de Burgh, "Separate Tables"
- Wet Wet Wet, "More than Love"
- Étienne Daho, "Un Homme A La Mer"
- Étienne Daho, "Rue Des Petits Hotels"
- Étienne Daho, "Des Attractions Desastres"
- Etienne Daho, "Double Zero et L’Infini"
- Etienne Daho, "Interlude à la Desirade"
- Tuck & Patti, "Dreams"
- Florent Pagny, "Si Tu Veux M'Essayer"
- Liane Foly, "Laisse Pleurer Les Nuages"
- Les Valentins, "Les Pieds Dans La Lune"
- Patricia Kaas, "Kennedy Rose"
- Patricia Kaas, "Il Me Dit Que Je Suis Belle"
- Toni Childs, "Many Rivers to Cross"
- Del Amitri, "Kiss This Thing Goodbye"
- Tiffany, "Here in My Heart"
- Sons of Angels, "Cow Girls"
- New Kids on the Block, "This One's for the Children"
- New Kids on the Block, "Hangin' Tough"
- New Kids on the Block, "I'll Be Loving You (Forever)"
- New Kids on the Block, "You Got It (The Right Stuff)"
- New Kids on the Block, "Please Don't Go Girl"
- Easterhouse, "Come Out Fighting"
- Cheryl Pepsii Riley, "Me, Myself and I"
- Tuck & Patti, "Time After Time"
- Johnny Clegg & Savuka, "Take My Heart Away"
- Baxter Robertson, "No Simple Cure"
- The Cars, "Strap Me In"
- Little Steven, "No More Party's"
- Pete Bardens, "In Dreams"
- Ray Parker Jr., "Girls Are More Fun"
- Patti LaBelle, "Stir It Up"
- Nomo, "Red Lipstick"

== Commercials ==
- American Express - Music Lover, Club Girl
- Babybel – The Printer
- Baileys – Truth, Dare
- Bass Ale - A Taste For More
- Bertolli – Anthem
- British Midland – Escape, Flight 1400
- Cadillac - Interstate
- Caress – LL Cool J
- Chase Bank - Back and Forth
- Chrysler - Make It Safer, Anthem, 300,
- Davidoff - Cool Water Woman
- Dunkin' Donuts - Rachel Ray, Mobile Office
- Ebel - Architects of Time
- First Direct - Barbershop
- Ford - Henri
- France Telecom – Couple, Hammock
- Heineken – Heineken Squad
- Hugo Boss – Hugo, It's Just A Fragrance
- Kodak – Narvick, Temple, Mount Blanc
- Kronenbourg – Barman, Player
- Levi's – Hampster, Wives
- LG - Lear Jet
- Lloyds TSB – Boots, Paint, Lights, Note for Note
- Mars - The Jogger
- MasterCard - World Market
- Mercedes-Benz - Change Lanes
- Microsoft – Fox, Worm, Cow, Alien, Pamela
- Molson Canadian - Under The Snow, Snowbank, Here's To You Canada
- Orangina - Le Salaire de la Pulpe
- Palm - Gallery Opening
- Peugeot - Ambush, Jump, The Hunt
- Prudential Golf, Rear Window
- Renault – Alligators, Kangaroos, Cows
- Rover - Crossroads
- Samsung – Estella Warren
- SBC - Makin’ It
- Smirnoff - Autocue
- Sony Ericsson – Snatch, Torn, Change The Record, Dentist, Church, Fans
- Target – Aqua, Guitar Kid, Dove, Tide
- Toyota – Spies, Cyborg, Slap, The Bicycle
- UPS – Singer, Caring Pilot
- Virgin Mobile – Frozen, Wyclef Jean, Kellis
- Visa - Traffic Cop
- Vodafone - Laugh
