= American Music Awards of 1990 =

US television program

17th Annual American Music Awards
- Date: January 22, 1990
- Location: Shrine Auditorium; Los Angeles, California
- Country: United States
- Hosted by: Anita Baker; Alice Cooper; Gloria Estefan; Naomi Judd; Wynonna Judd
- First award: 1973

Highlights
- Most awards: Milli Vanilli (3)
- Most nominations: Bobby Brown and Soul II Soul (5 each)
- Website: American Music Awards

Television/radio coverage
- Network: ABC
- Produced by: Dick Clark Productions

The 17th Annual American Music Awards were held on January 22, 1990, at the Shrine Auditorium, in Los Angeles, California. The awards recognized the most popular artists and albums from the year 1989.

== Performances ==
Artist(s)	Song(s)	Introduced by
Paula Abdul	"The Way That You Love Me"	—N/a
Richard Marx	"Too Late To Say Goodbye"	Anita Baker
Tone Loc	Medley: "Wild Thing" "Funky Cold Medina"	Anita Baker
Randy Travis	"It's Just a Matter of Time"	Naomi Judd; Wynonna Judd
Janet Jackson	"Escapade"	Naomi Judd; Wynonna Judd
Warrant	"Heaven"	Naomi Judd; Wynonna Judd
Gloria Estefan; Miami Sound Machine	Medley: "Here We Are" "Get on Your Feet"	Naomi Judd; Wynonna Judd
New Kids on the Block	Medley: "Cover Girl" "Hangin' Tough" "You Got It (The Right Stuff)" "This One's For The Children"	Gloria Estefan
Anita Baker	"Good Love"	Gloria Estefan
The Judds	"Calling in the Wind"	Gloria Estefan
Alice Cooper	"House of Fire"	Anita Baker
Bobby Brown	Medley: "My Prerogative" "Every Little Step"	Anita Baker
Great White	"House of Broken Love"	Alice Cooper
Rod Stewart	"Downtown Train"	Alice Cooper

== Winners and nominees ==
Subcategory	Winner	Nominees
Pop/Rock Category
Favorite Pop/Rock Male Artist	Bobby Brown	Richard Marx; John Cougar Mellencamp
Favorite Pop/Rock Female Artist	Paula Abdul	Anita Baker; Madonna
Favorite Pop/Rock Band/Duo/Group	New Kids on the Block	Bon Jovi; Milli Vanilli
Favorite Pop/Rock Album	Hangin' Tough - New Kids on the Block	Forever Your Girl - Paula Abdul; Don't Be Cruel - Bobby Brown
Favorite Pop/Rock Song	"Girl You Know It's True" - Milli Vanilli	"I'll Be There for You" - Bon Jovi "Don't Wanna Lose You" - Gloria Estefan
Favorite Pop/Rock New Artist	Milli Vanilli	Living Colour; Traveling Wilburys
Soul/R&B Category
Favorite Soul/R&B Male Artist	Luther Vandross	Bobby Brown; Prince
Favorite Soul/R&B Female Artist	Anita Baker	Paula Abdul; Stephanie Mills
Favorite Soul/R&B Band/Duo/Group	The O'Jays	Guy; Soul II Soul
Favorite Soul/R&B Album	Don't Be Cruel - Bobby Brown	Let's Get It Started - MC Hammer; Karyn White - Karyn White
Favorite Soul/R&B Song	"Miss You Much" - Janet Jackson	"Just Because" - Anita Baker "Keep on Movin'" - Soul II Soul
Favorite Soul/R&B New Artist	Milli Vanilli	Babyface; Soul II Soul
Country Category
Favorite Country Male Artist	Randy Travis	George Strait; Hank Williams, Jr.
Favorite Country Female Artist	Reba McEntire	K.T. Oslin; Dolly Parton
Favorite Country Band/Duo/Group	Alabama	Highway 101; The Judds
Favorite Country Album	Old 8x10 - Randy Travis	Beyond the Blue Neon - George Strait; Greatest Hits III - Hank Williams, Jr.
Favorite Country Song	"Deeper Than the Holler" - Randy Travis	"If I Had You" - Alabama "Baby's Gotten Good at Goodbye" - George Strait
Favorite Country New Artist	Clint Black	Cee Cee Chapman; Skip Ewing
Dance Category
Favorite Dance Artist	Paula Abdul	Bobby Brown; Janet Jackson
Favorite Dance Song	"Miss You Much" - Janet Jackson	"Like a Prayer" - Madonna "Back to Life" - Soul II Soul
Favorite Dance New Artist	Tone Loc	De La Soul; Soul II Soul
Heavy Metal/Hard Rock Category
Favorite Heavy Metal/Hard Rock Artist	Guns N' Roses	Aerosmith; Mötley Crüe
Favorite Heavy Metal/Hard Rock Album	Appetite for Destruction - Guns N' Roses	Dr. Feelgood - Mötley Crüe; Skid Row - Skid Row
Favorite Heavy Metal/Hard Rock New Artist	Skid Row	Warrant; Winger
Rap/Hip-Hop Category
Favorite Rap/Hip-Hop Artist	MC Hammer	Eazy-E; Tone Loc
Favorite Rap/Hip-Hop Album	Let's Get It Started - MC Hammer	Eazy-Duz-It - Eazy-E; Loc'ed After Dark - Tone Loc
Favorite Rap/Hip-Hop New Artist	Young MC	Eazy-E; Tone Loc
Merit
Neil Diamond
Special Achievement Award
Prince
