= Still Kids =

Studio album by New Kids on the Block
- Released: May 17, 2024
- Genre: Pop
- Length: 44:04
- Label: BMG
- Producer: Luke Batt; Deekay; Esben Dithmer; Ashley Gordon; Frans Nielsen; Obi; Pink Laces; Jordan Patrick Ruddy; Adam Seuba; David Stewart; Sean Thomas; Donnie Wahlberg

New Kids on the Block chronology
Thankful (2017)	Still Kids (2024)

Singles from Still Kids
- 1. "Kids" Released: March 5, 2024; 2. "A Love Like This" Released: April 26, 2024

Still Kids is the eighth studio album by American boy band New Kids on the Block. It was released on May 17, 2024, by BMG. This is their first studio album since 2013's 10. The album features collaborations with DJ Jazzy Jeff and Taylor Dayne.

== Background ==
The band announced the album in March 2024. Donnie Wahlberg describes the album as the most mature, fun and comfortable album they had ever made.

== Composition ==
Wahlberg co-wrote on seven of the album's tracks, and McIntyre wrote on six. The fourth track and lead single "Kids", written by David Stewart and Luke Batt, is a mid-tempo song.

== Release and promotion ==
Still Kids was released on May 17, 2024, by BMG Rights Management. On March 8, 2024, they appeared on The Kelly Clarkson Show and performed "Kids". On May 17, 2024, they appeared on Good Morning America. The band performed with American Idol season 22 contestant KAYKO during the season 22 finale on May 19, 2024. They also performed songs from the album at an IHeartRadio live performance in May 2024 in California, which was broadcast on PBS stations in September, and performed "Kids" as one of their songs at the IHeartRadio music festival in Las Vegas as well as at Audacy's "We Can Survive" concert in September 2024.

From June 14, to August 25, 2024, they promoted the album on The Magic Summer Tour (2024).

=== Singles ===
The album's lead single "Kids" was released on March 5, 2024. The second single "A Love Like This" was released on April 26, 2024.

== Critical reception ==
Professional ratings
Review scores
Source	Rating
AllMusic	4/5 stars
RetroPop	4/5 stars
The Independent	7/10

Stephen Thomas Erlewine of AllMusic gave the album four out of five stars and said, "Still Kids finds New Kids on the Block playing to their strengths, winding up with an album that sounds fresher than expected and is arguably tighter than their big hits of yore." Carla Feric of The Independent wrote, "The album's upbeat summer songs will stick with you all day; they're catchy, the lyrics are memorable, and they capture the classic boy-band 'pop' sound that fans and casual listeners alike can appreciate."

== Track listing ==
Still Kids track listing
No.	Title	Writer(s)	Producer(s)	Length
1.	"Magic"	Joey McIntyre; Donnie Wahlberg; Sean Thomas	Thomas^{[p]}	2:35
2.	"Summer Love"	D. Wahlberg; Nikolaj Tøth Andersen; Oliver Bernburg; Esben Dithmer; Lars Halvor Jensen; Frans Nielsen; Kristoffer Lambek; Adam Seuba; Kirat Singh; Kasper Vestergaard	D. Wahlberg; Seuba; Deekay; Dithmer; Nielsen; Jensen^{[v]}	3:01
3.	"Long Time Coming"	McIntyre; Thomas; Ashley Gordon	Gordon; Thomas^{[p]}	2:59
4.	"Kids"	David Stewart; Luke Batt	Stewart; Batt	2:58
5.	"A Love Like This"	D. Wahlberg; Dithmer; Jensen	D. Wahlberg; Deekay; Dithmer; Jensen^{[v]}	3:52
6.	"Dance with You"	D. Wahlberg; Dithmer; Jensen	D. Wahlberg; Deekay; Dithmer; Jensen^{[v]}	3:03
7.	"Come Back"	McIntyre; Thomas	Thomas^{[p]}	2:48
8.	"In the Night"	D. Wahlberg; Jensen; Kevin Cofield; Elijah Wahlberg	D. Wahlberg; Deekay; Pink Laces; Jensen^{[v]}	3:29
9.	"Runaway"	D. Wahlberg; Jensen; Jordan Patrick Ruddy	D. Wahlberg; Deekay; Ruddy; Jensen^{[v]}	3:19
10.	"Pop"	McIntyre; Thomas	Thomas^{[p]}	3:17
11.	"Get Down" (featuring DJ Jazzy Jeff)	D. Wahlberg; Jensen; Bernard Edwards; Nile Rodgers	D. Wahlberg; Deekay; Jensen^{[v]}	3:07
12.	"Old School Love" (featuring Taylor Dayne)	Jordan Knight; D. Wahlberg; Jensen; Marcella Brailsford Daniel Klein; Charli Taft	D. Wahlberg; Obi^{[p]}; Deekay; Jensen^{[v]}	3:08
13.	"Better Days"	McIntyre; Thomas	Thomas^{[p]}; McIntyre^{[v]}	2:56
14.	"Stay"	McIntyre; Thomas	Thomas^{[p]}	3:32
Total length:				44:04

Notes

- "Get Down" contains a sample of "Upside Down" by Diana Ross.
- ^{^[p]} signifies a primary and vocal producer
- ^{^[v]} signifies a vocal producer

== Personnel ==
New Kids on the Block

- Jonathan Knight – vocals
- Jordan Knight – vocals
- Joey McIntyre – vocals
- Donnie Wahlberg – vocals
- Danny Wood – vocals

Additional musicians

- Luke Batt – backing vocals, bass guitar, drum programming, guitar, keyboards (4)
- Oliver Bernburg – bass (2)
- Max Bernstein – guitar (5)
- Kevin Cofield – synthesizer (8)
- Esben Dithmer – instrumentation (2, 6), programming (5)
- DJ Jazzy Jeff – backing vocals, scratching (11)
- Lars Halvor Jensen – backing vocals, instrumentation (11)
- Ashley Gordon – instrumentation (3)
- Kristoffer Lambek – guitar (2)
- Martin Larsson – programming (8, 9); backing vocals, instrumentation (11)
- Griffin McIntyre – guitar (14)
- Mathias Neumann – backing vocals, programming (11)
- Frans Nielsen – instrumentation (2)
- Obi – instrumentation (12)
- Jordan Patrick Ruddy – instrumentation (9)
- Adam Seuba – backing vocals (2, 11)
- David Stewart – backing vocals, bass guitar, drum programming, guitar, keyboards (4)
- Charli Taft – additional vocals (12)
- Sean Thomas – instrumentation (1, 3, 7, 10, 13, 14)
- Elijah Wahlberg – drums (8)

Production

- Matthew Barnes – mixing assistance (4)
- Luke Batt – producer (4)
- Deekay – producer (2, 5, 6, 8, 9, 11, 12)
- Esben Dithmer – producer (2, 5, 6)
- Ashley Gordon — producer (3)
- Charlie Holmes – mixing (4)
- Lars Halvor Jensen – vocal engineering (12), vocal producer (2, 5, 6, 8, 9, 11, 12)
- Holger Lagerfeldt – engineering
- Martin Larsson – mixing (2, 5, 6, 8, 9, 11, 12)
- Joey McIntyre – vocal producer (13)
- Frans Nielsen – producer (2)
- Obi – producer (12)
- Pink Laces – producer (8)
- Jordan Patrick Ruddy – producer (9)
- Adam Seuba – producer (2)
- David Stewart — producer (4)
- Sean Thomas – mixing (1, 3, 7, 10, 13, 14), producer (1, 3, 7, 10, 13) vocal producer (1, 3, 7 10, 13)
- Donnie Wahlberg — creative director, producer (2, 5, 6, 8, 9, 11, 13)

== Charts ==
Chart performance for Still Kids
Chart (2024)	Peak position
Australian Digital Albums (ARIA)	11
Australian Physical Albums (ARIA)	23
Belgian Albums (Ultratop Flanders)	158
German Albums (Offizielle Top 100)	59
Scottish Albums (OCC)	18
Swedish Physical Albums (Sverigetopplistan)	14
UK Album Downloads (OCC)	15
UK Albums Sales (OCC)	16
UK Physical Albums (OCC)	16
UK Independent Albums (OCC)	10
US Billboard 200	56
US Independent Albums (Billboard)	9
