= American Music Award for Best Pop Album =

Annual music award for pop albums

American Music Awards for Best Pop Album
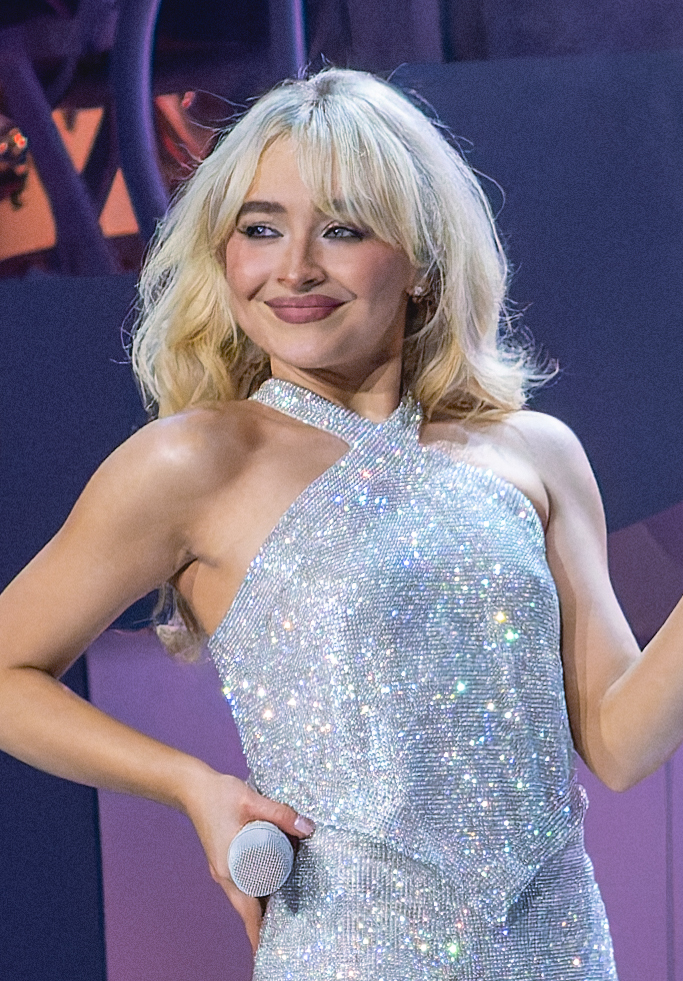
- Man's Best Friend by Sabrina Carpenter is the most recent recipient
- Country: United States
- Presented by: American Music Awards
- First award: 1974
- Currently held by: Sabrina Carpenter – Man's Best Friend

Highlights
- Most wins: Taylor Swift (5)
- Most nominations: Taylor Swift (10)
- Website: theamas.com

The American Music Award for Best Pop Album has been awarded since 1974. Years reflect the year in which the awards were presented, for works released in the previous year (until 2003 onward when awards were handed out on November of the same year). The all-time winner in this category is Taylor Swift with 5 wins. Swift has also received the most number of nominations in this category than any other artist. Justin Bieber and Michael Jackson are tied for the most wins among male artists, with 3 wins each. The award was previous known as Favorite Album – Pop/Rock until the 2026 ceremony, where the award was renamed to Best Pop Album.

== Winners and nominees ==
=== 1970s ===
Year	Artist	Album	Ref
1974 (1st)
1974 (1st)	Diana Ross	Lady Sings the Blues	
1974 (1st)	Seals and Crofts	Summer Breeze	
1974 (1st)	War	The World Is a Ghetto	
1975 (2nd)
1975 (2nd)	Charlie Rich	Behind Closed Doors	
1975 (2nd)	John Denver	John Denver's Greatest Hits	
1975 (2nd)	Elton John	Goodbye Yellow Brick Road	
1976 (3rd)
1976 (3rd)	Olivia Newton-John	Have You Never Been Mellow	
1976 (3rd)	Eagles	One of These Nights	
1976 (3rd)	Elton John	Greatest Hits	
1977 (4th)
1977 (4th)	Eagles	Their Greatest Hits (1971–1975)	
1977 (4th)	Peter Frampton	Frampton Comes Alive!	
1977 (4th)	Stevie Wonder	Songs in the Key of Life	
1978 (5th)
1978 (5th)	Fleetwood Mac	Rumours	
1978 (5th)	Eagles	Hotel California	
1978 (5th)	John Williams	Star Wars	
1979 (6th)
1979 (6th)	John Travolta and Olivia Newton-John	Grease: The Original Soundtrack from the Motion Picture	
1979 (6th)	Bee Gees	Saturday Night Fever	
1979 (6th)	Fleetwood Mac	Rumours	

=== 1980s ===
Year	Artist	Album	Ref
1980 (7th)
1980 (7th)	Bee Gees	Spirits Having Flown	
1980 (7th)	Led Zeppelin	In Through the Out Door	
1980 (7th)	Donna Summer	Bad Girls	
1981 (8th)
1981 (8th)	Billy Joel	Glass Houses	
1981 (8th)	Michael Jackson	Off the Wall	
1981 (8th)	Bob Seger	Against the Wind	
1982 (9th)
1982 (9th)	Kenny Rogers	Greatest Hits	
1982 (9th)	Foreigner	4	
1982 (9th)	John Lennon	Double Fantasy	
1982 (9th)	REO Speedwagon	Hi Infidelity	
1983 (10th)
1983 (10th)	Willie Nelson	Always on My Mind	
1983 (10th)	Fleetwood Mac	Mirage	
1983 (10th)	Journey	Escape	
1984 (11th)
1984 (11th)	Michael Jackson	Thriller	
1984 (11th)	Def Leppard	Pyromania	
1984 (11th)	The Police	Synchronicity	
1984 (11th)	Various Artists	Flashdance	
1985 (12th)
1985 (12th)	Prince	Purple Rain	
1985 (12th)	Michael Jackson	Thriller	
1985 (12th)	Lionel Richie	Can't Slow Down	
1986 (13th)
1986 (13th)	Bruce Springsteen	Born in the U.S.A.	
1986 (13th)	Phil Collins	No Jacket Required	
1986 (13th)	Madonna	Like a Virgin	
1987 (14th)
1987 (14th)	Whitney Houston	Whitney Houston	
1987 (14th)	Janet Jackson	Control	
1987 (14th)	Van Halen	5150	
1987 (14th)	Various Artists	Top Gun	
1988 (15th)
1988 (15th)	Paul Simon	Graceland	
1988 (15th)	Bon Jovi	Slippery When Wet	
1988 (15th)	U2	The Joshua Tree	
1988 (15th)	Whitesnake	Whitesnake	
1989 (16th)
1989 (16th)	Various Artists	Dirty Dancing	
1989 (16th)	Def Leppard	Hysteria	
1989 (16th)	George Michael	Faith	

=== 1990s ===
Year	Artist	Album	Ref
1990 (17th)
1990 (17th)	New Kids on the Block	Hangin' Tough	
1990 (17th)	Paula Abdul	Forever Your Girl	
1990 (17th)	Bobby Brown	Don't Be Cruel	
1991 (18th)
1991 (18th)	Phil Collins	...But Seriously	
1991 (18th)	Janet Jackson	Janet Jackson's Rhythm Nation 1814	
1991 (18th)	MC Hammer	Please Hammer, Don't Hurt 'Em	
1992 (19th)
1992 (19th)	Michael Bolton	Time, Love & Tenderness	
1992 (19th)	C+C Music Factory	Gonna Make You Sweat	
1992 (19th)	Natalie Cole	Unforgettable... with Love	
1992 (19th)	R.E.M.	Out of Time	
1993 (20th)
1993 (20th)	Michael Jackson	Dangerous	
1993 (20th)	Kris Kross	Totally Krossed Out	
1993 (20th)	U2	Achtung Baby	
1994 (21st)
1994 (21st)	Whitney Houston	The Bodyguard	
1994 (21st)	Janet Jackson	Janet	
1994 (21st)	Spin Doctors	Pocket Full of Kryptonite	
1994 (21st)	Eric Clapton	Unplugged	
1995 (22nd)
1995 (22nd)	Elton John and Tim Rice	The Lion King	
1995 (22nd)	Mariah Carey	Music Box	
1995 (22nd)	Counting Crows	August and Everything After	
1996 (23rd)
1996 (23rd)	Eagles	Hell Freezes Over	
1996 (23rd)	Boyz II Men	II	
1996 (23rd)	Hootie & the Blowfish	Cracked Rear View	
1997 (24th)
1997 (24th)	Alanis Morissette	Jagged Little Pill	
1997 (24th)	The Beatles	The Beatles Anthology	
1997 (24th)	Mariah Carey	Daydream	
1998 (25th)
1998 (25th)	Spice Girls	Spice	
1998 (25th)	Jewel	Pieces of You	
1998 (25th)	Matchbox Twenty	Yourself or Someone Like You	
1998 (25th)	The Wallflowers	Bringing Down the Horse	
1999 (26th)
1999 (26th)	Will Smith	Big Willie Style	
1999 (26th)	Celine Dion	Let's Talk About Love	
1999 (26th)	Shania Twain	Come On Over	

=== 2000s ===
Year	Artist	Album	Ref
2000 (27th)
2000 (27th)	Santana	Supernatural	
2000 (27th)	Backstreet Boys	Millennium	
2000 (27th)	Britney Spears	...Baby One More Time	
2001 (28th)
2001 (28th)	Creed	Human Clay	
2001 (28th)	NSYNC	No Strings Attached	
2001 (28th)	Britney Spears	Oops!... I Did It Again	
2002 (29th)
2002 (29th)	Destiny's Child	Survivor	
2002 (29th)	Dave Matthews Band	Everyday	
2002 (29th)	NSYNC	Celebrity	
2003 (30th)
2003 (30th)	Eminem	The Eminem Show	
2003 (30th)	Ashanti	Ashanti	
2003 (30th)	Nelly	Nellyville	
2003 (30th)	P!nk	Missundaztood	
2003 (31st)
2003 (31st)	Justin Timberlake	Justified	
2003 (31st)	Evanescence	Fallen	
2003 (31st)	Norah Jones	Come Away with Me	
2003 (31st)	Kid Rock	Cocky	
2004 (32nd)
2004 (32nd)	Usher	Confessions	
2004 (32nd)	Norah Jones	Feels Like Home	
2004 (32nd)	Jessica Simpson	In This Skin	
2005 (33rd)
2005 (33rd)	Green Day	American Idiot	
2005 (33rd)	Mariah Carey	The Emancipation of Mimi	
2005 (33rd)	Kelly Clarkson	Breakaway	
2006 (34th)
2006 (34th)	Nickelback	All the Right Reasons	
2006 (34th)	Red Hot Chili Peppers	Stadium Arcadium	
2006 (34th)	Various Artists	High School Musical	
2007 (35th)
2007 (35th)	Daughtry	Daughtry	
2007 (35th)	Linkin Park	Minutes to Midnight	
2007 (35th)	Justin Timberlake	FutureSex/LoveSounds	
2008 (36th)
2008 (36th)	Alicia Keys	As I Am	
2008 (36th)	Coldplay	Viva la Vida or Death and All His Friends	
2008 (36th)	Eagles	Long Road Out of Eden	
2009 (37th)
2009 (37th)	Michael Jackson	Number Ones	
2009 (37th)	Lady Gaga	The Fame	
2009 (37th)	Taylor Swift	Fearless	

=== 2010s ===
Year	Artist	Album	Ref
2010 (38th)
2010 (38th)	Justin Bieber	My World 2.0	
2010 (38th)	Eminem	Recovery	
2010 (38th)	Katy Perry	Teenage Dream	
2011 (39th)
2011 (39th)	Adele	21	
2011 (39th)	Lady Gaga	Born This Way	
2011 (39th)	Rihanna	Loud	
2012 (40th)
2012 (40th)	Justin Bieber	Believe	
2012 (40th)	Maroon 5	Overexposed	
2012 (40th)	Nicki Minaj	Pink Friday: Roman Reloaded	
2012 (40th)	One Direction	Up All Night	
2013 (41st)
2013 (41st)	One Direction	Take Me Home	
2013 (41st)	Taylor Swift	Red	
2013 (41st)	Justin Timberlake	The 20/20 Experience	
2014 (42nd)
2014 (42nd)	One Direction	Midnight Memories	
2014 (42nd)	Lorde	Pure Heroine	
2014 (42nd)	Katy Perry	Prism	
2015 (43rd)
2015 (43rd)	Taylor Swift	1989	
2015 (43rd)	Ed Sheeran	×	
2015 (43rd)	Sam Smith	In the Lonely Hour	
2016 (44th)
2016 (44th)	Justin Bieber	Purpose	
2016 (44th)	Adele	25	
2016 (44th)	Drake	Views	
2017 (45th)
2017 (45th)	Bruno Mars	24K Magic	
2017 (45th)	Drake	More Life	
2017 (45th)	The Weeknd	Starboy	
2018 (46th)
2018 (46th)	Taylor Swift	Reputation	
2018 (46th)	Drake	Scorpion	
2018 (46th)	Ed Sheeran	÷	
2019 (47th)
2019 (47th)	Taylor Swift	Lover	
2019 (47th)	Billie Eilish	When We All Fall Asleep, Where Do We Go?	
2019 (47th)	Ariana Grande	Thank U, Next	

=== 2020s ===
Year	Artist	Album	Ref
2020 (48th)
2020 (48th)	Harry Styles	Fine Line	
2020 (48th)	Taylor Swift	Folklore	
2020 (48th)	The Weeknd	After Hours	
2021 (49th)
2021 (49th)	Taylor Swift	Evermore	
2021 (49th)	Ariana Grande	Positions	
2021 (49th)	The Kid Laroi	F*ck Love	
2021 (49th)	Dua Lipa	Future Nostalgia	
2021 (49th)	Olivia Rodrigo	Sour	
2022 (50th)
2022 (50th)	Taylor Swift	Red (Taylor's Version)	
2022 (50th)	Adele	30	
2022 (50th)	Bad Bunny	Un Verano Sin Ti	
2022 (50th)	Beyoncé	Renaissance	
2022 (50th)	Harry Styles	Harry's House	
2022 (50th)	The Weeknd	Dawn FM	
2023 – 24	—N/a		
2025 (51st)
2025 (51st)	Billie Eilish	Hit Me Hard and Soft	
2025 (51st)	Sabrina Carpenter	Short n' Sweet	
2025 (51st)	Charli XCX	Brat	
2025 (51st)	Chappell Roan	The Rise and Fall of a Midwest Princess	
2025 (51st)	Taylor Swift	The Tortured Poets Department	
2026 (52nd)
2026 (52nd)	Sabrina Carpenter	Man's Best Friend	
2026 (52nd)	Lady Gaga	Mayhem	
2026 (52nd)	Olivia Dean	The Art of Loving	
2026 (52nd)	Tate McRae	So Close to What	
2026 (52nd)	Taylor Swift	The Life of a Showgirl	

== Category facts ==
=== Multiple awards ===
5 awards

- Taylor Swift

3 awards

- Justin Bieber
- Michael Jackson

2 awards

- Eagles
- Whitney Houston
- Olivia Newton-John
- One Direction

=== Multiple nominations ===
10 nominations

- Taylor Swift

5 nominations

- Eagles
- Michael Jackson

3 nominations

- Adele
- Justin Bieber
- Mariah Carey
- Drake
- Fleetwood Mac
- Janet Jackson
- Elton John
- Lady Gaga
- One Direction
- Justin Timberlake

2 nominations

- Bee Gees
- Sabrina Carpenter
- Phil Collins
- Def Leppard
- Billie Eilish
- Eminem
- Ariana Grande
- Whitney Houston
- Norah Jones
- Olivia Newton-John
- NSYNC
- Katy Perry
- Britney Spears
- Harry Styles
- U2
