= New Kids on the Block =

American vocal group

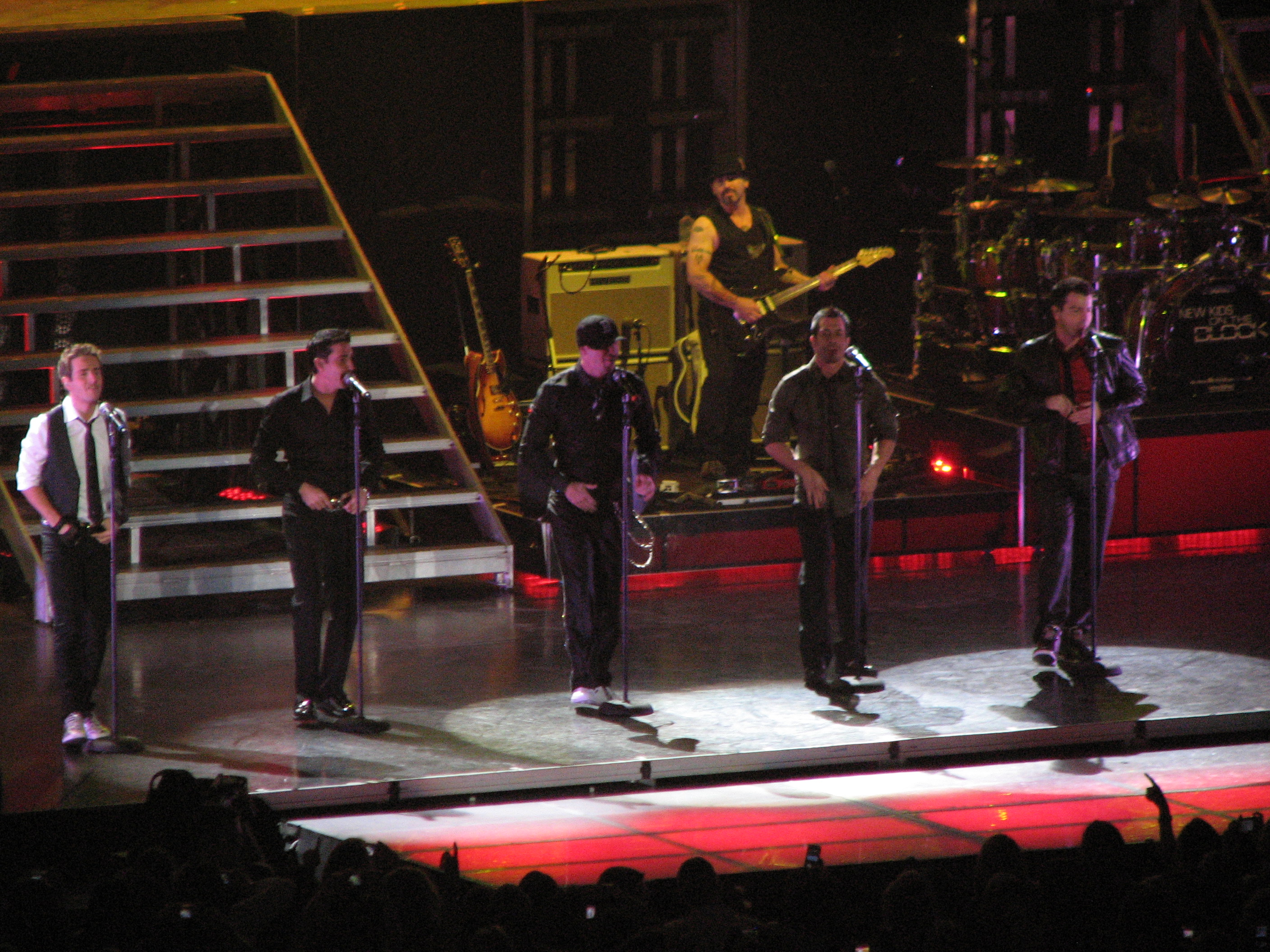
- NKOTB during a 2008 concert, from left to right: Joey McIntyre, Jonathan Knight, Donnie Wahlberg, Danny Wood, Jordan Knight

Background information
- Also known as: NKOTB
- Origin: Dorchester, Massachusetts, U.S.
- Genres: Pop; R&B; teen pop
- Works: New Kids on the Block discography
- Years active: 1984–1994; 2008–present
- Labels: Columbia; CBS; Interscope; The Block; NKOTB Music
- Spinoffs: NKOTBSB
- Members: Jonathan Knight; Jordan Knight; Joey McIntyre; Donnie Wahlberg; Danny Wood
- Past members: Jamie Kelly; Mark Wahlberg
- Website: nkotb.com

New Kids on the Block (stylized as NKOTB) are an American vocal group from Dorchester, Massachusetts. Initially conceived as a boy band, the group consists of brothers Jonathan and Jordan Knight, Joey McIntyre, Donnie Wahlberg, and Danny Wood. New Kids on the Block had success in the late 1980s and early 1990s, and have sold more than 80 million records worldwide. They won two American Music Awards in 1990 for "Favorite Pop/Rock Band, Duo, or Group" and "Favorite Pop/Rock Album". Additionally, they are often credited for paving the way for later boy bands such as Take That, Backstreet Boys, and NSYNC.

Formed in 1984, New Kids on the Block achieved stardom in 1989, an achievement listed as number 16 on Rolling Stone's "Top 25 Teen Idol Breakout Moments". Although the group disbanded in 1994, they reunited in 2007 to record an album and mount a concert tour in 2008. Since then the group has released two more studio albums and have continued to tour.

The group received a star on the Hollywood Walk of Fame in 2014. Fans of the group are often referred to as "Blockheads".

== History ==
=== 1984–1986: Early career ===
In the early 1980s, Maurice Starr discovered pop/R&B quintet New Edition, and guided their early success. After he was fired by New Edition for embezzling funds, Starr and his business partner, Mary Alford, sought to create a white counterpart act. Fifteen-year-old Donnie Wahlberg impressed Starr and Alford with his rapping skills, becoming the group's first member. He was initially joined by his younger brother Mark, who left the group after only a few months. Donnie then recruited his school friends Jamie Kelly, Jordan Knight and Danny Wood to join the group; Knight was followed into the group by his older brother Jonathan, while Kelly left the group early on.

When a search was made to find a Michael Jackson-esque singer to replace Kelly, Starr recruited 12-year-old Joey McIntyre, who initially struggled to fit in with the group. With the final lineup in place, Starr rehearsed the boys after school and on weekends, and eventually secured the group a recording contract at Columbia Records.

Originally, the group was called Nynuk (pronounced "na-nook"). Nikki Van Noy, author of the group's official biography, wrote in 2012 that the name Nynuk is "meaningless", although a 1989 article by Rolling Stone suggested a possible connection to Nanook of the North. Columbia demanded Starr change the name of the group. Subsequently, they settled on New Kids on the Block, after a rap song that Donnie Wahlberg had written and arranged for their first album. The group was signed to Columbia's black music division and originally marketed to black audiences.

=== 1986–1987: New Kids on the Block (debut album) ===
In April 1986, Columbia Records released the group's self-titled debut album. The album was almost exclusively written and produced by Maurice Starr, and featured mid-1980s bubblegum pop material. The first single, "Be My Girl", received minor airplay around the group's native Boston but failed to capture nationwide attention. The album's second single, "Stop It Girl", fared even worse. The New Kids went on tour around the New England states, singing wherever Starr could book them: in bars, school dances, and clubs. Nevertheless, Starr remained diligent and persuaded the label to allow the group to record a second album.

=== 1987–1989: Hangin' Tough ===
After the failure of the first album, Starr had the group back in the studio for most of 1987 and 1988 recording their second album. Dissatisfied with the excessively bubblegum sound of their first album, the group wanted to have more input on their look, direction and song material. As a result, Wahlberg, Wood and Jordan Knight received associate producer credit on the final product. The album, Hangin' Tough, was released to modest fanfare in September. The album's first single was "Please Don't Go Girl", a ballad released in the spring of 1988. Failure seemed destined a second time when the song became another that went unnoticed by the listening public, and Columbia Records made plans to drop the New Kids from the label. At the eleventh hour, however, a pop radio station in Florida began playing the song. Scoring listener approval, it soon became the most requested song on their play list. When Columbia caught wind of the positive response, they decided to keep the group on its roster and put more effort into promoting the single. Columbia decided to re-shoot a music video for "Please Don't Go Girl", hiring director Doug Nichol, and sent the video to thousands of radio stations across the country to show the group's visual appeal. National attention soon followed and "Please Don't Go Girl" eventually climbed to No. 10 on Billboard's Hot 100 Singles Chart—becoming the group's first hit.

In the meantime, the group began making national televised appearances on such music programs as Showtime at the Apollo and Soul Train. Producer Maurice Starr then held auditions to secure a band of musicians suitable for touring with the New Kids, approving musical director and keyboardist Greg McPherson, bassist David Dyson, keyboardist Yasko Kubota, guitarist Nerida Rojas, and drummer Derrick Antunes. The New Kids later landed a spot as an opening act for fellow teen-pop act Tiffany on the U.S. leg of her concert tour. Sales of Hangin' Tough steadily increased as the group's national attention slowly rose. At year's end, the album's second single, "You Got It (The Right Stuff)", was released. The song was given a huge boost when MTV took notice of the group and began playing the video in regular rotation, including an appearance on Club MTV. By early 1989, it cracked the top five. The New Kids hit pay dirt with their next single, "I'll Be Loving You (Forever)", which reached No. 1 on the Billboard Hot 100 Singles chart in June. The group had been scheduled to open for Tiffany once again on a second tour, but their sudden popularity caused a reversal, and she wound up opening for them (although the two acts were technically billed as "co-headliners").

More top five singles from Hangin' Tough followed into the summer and fall, including the title track and "Cover Girl". Columbia Records also released the single "Didn't I (Blow Your Mind This Time)" (a cover of The Delfonics' classic hit), from the group's previously overlooked debut album. The song went No. 8 on the Billboard Hot 100 Singles on the strength of the group's popularity and effectively jump-started the sales of that album as well. By the end of 1989, Hangin' Tough had climbed to number one on the Billboard 200 Albums Chart and had gone eight-times platinum. They subsequently became the first 'teen' act to garner five top ten hits from a single album.

Meanwhile, a top ten charting holiday album, Merry, Merry Christmas, was released in the fall—spawning another top 10 hit, "This One's for the Children", and going double platinum in the U.S. The proceeds were donated to United Cerebral Palsy, the New Kids' favorite charitable cause. Hangin' Tough would go on to spend 132 weeks on the chart, and in January 1990, the album won two American Music Awards for "Best Pop/Rock Album" and "Best Pop/Rock Group". With the success of "Didn't I (Blow Your Mind)", "Cover Girl", and "This One's For the Children", the group pulled off a rare feat of having three singles on the Billboard Hot 100 at the same time, but each from a different album.

Columbia Music Video also released a home video, Hangin' Tough, a documentary on the band directed by Doug Nichol and produced by Bryan Johnson that included their four hit music videos and a live concert recorded during their 1989 tour. It achieved massive sales, earning a Grammy Award for Best Long Form Music Video nomination, and was one of the biggest selling music videos of all time.

The then governor of Massachusetts, Michael Dukakis, declared April 24, 1989 to be "New Kids on the Block Day".

=== 1989–1993: Step by Step and lip synching allegations ===
By the end of the late 1980s and at the beginning of the early 1990s, New Kids on the Block had become one of the most popular acts in the United States. That May, they followed up Hangin' Tough with Step by Step, for which just over half of the songs were cowritten and produced by the members themselves. The first single, the title track, hit number one on the Hot 100 Singles Chart and became their biggest-selling single. It was followed up with their ninth consecutive top-ten single, "Tonight". The group was achieving significant international success, as well: "Let's Try It Again" hit No. 8 on the UK singles chart, while "Baby I Believe in You" went to number one in Japan. The album was eventually certified triple platinum, selling close to 20 million copies worldwide. By late 1990, David Dyson assumed the role of musical director.

The group performed an estimated two hundred concerts a year, with an extravagant worldwide concert tour that summer called The Magic Summer Tour, sponsored by Coke. The tour ultimately grossed $74 million ($133 million adjusted for inflation), making them the top-grossing touring act in the country at the time and one of the highest-grossing concert tours of the decade, with overall attendance of 3.2 million people. Their 1990 pay-per-view special broke records at the time. During this time, NKOTB licensed merchandise flooded the market, including lunch boxes, buttons, t-shirts, comic books (published by Harvey Comics), and dolls. They inspired a Saturday morning cartoon, developed by the Pangea Corporation and animated by DIC Entertainment. In 1991, sales of the group's merchandise was estimated at US$400 million.

New Kids on the Block's official fan club had a membership of over 200,000 and was one of the largest in the United States. The official NKOTB hotline, 1-900-909-5KIDs, received approximately 100,000 calls per week. In 1991, the group topped Forbes' list of highest paid entertainers, ahead of Michael Jackson, Madonna, Prince and Bill Cosby. At year's end, Columbia released No More Games/The Remix Album, a compilation of remixes of the group's biggest hits. It produced two singles, "Call It What You Want (The C&C Pump-It Mix)" (UK No. 12) and "Games (The New Kids Get Hard Mix)" (UK No. 14), for which videos were also released.

The group released no new material in 1991, and instead toured throughout Europe and Asia. That summer, Wood and Wahlberg co-wrote and co-produced Music for the People, the debut album from Marky Mark and the Funky Bunch, headed by Wahlberg's brother Mark, a former New Kid. Music for the People would end up going platinum and scoring a number-one hit with "Good Vibrations". In 1991, they performed the halftime show at Super Bowl XXV, a first for a pop music group, however the performance was not broadcast on TV due to a preemption for a speech from President George H. W. Bush regarding the Gulf War. (Note: Initially, marching bands and dance troupes were the half-time headlining performers. The 1991 appearance by the New Kids on the Block was the first time a musical group was the headline act.)

In early 1992, the group released the stand-alone single "If You Go Away", the only new track on the compilation H.I.T.S.. The song peaked at No. 16 on the US charts and No. 9 in the UK. Meanwhile, as the music industry was still reeling from the Milli Vanilli lip-synching scandal, NKOTB found themselves accused of lip-synching by Gregory McPherson. Credited as an associate producer and string arranger on the Step by Step album and a music teacher at Berklee College of Music, McPherson alleged that Maurice Starr sang the vocals while the group lip-synched to pre-recorded vocals during their live performances. McPherson also filed a breach of contract and creative infringement lawsuit against Starr.

The group immediately responded to the allegations and interrupted the Australian leg of their tour to fly to Los Angeles to perform live on The Arsenio Hall Show. After performing a medley of their previous hits and their new single, the group (along with Starr) was interviewed by Hall. The group admitted to singing with a backing track during live performances and also admitted that Starr sang harmony on some background vocals.

On February 10, 1992, the New Kids filed a defamation lawsuit against McPherson regarding his lip-synching allegations. In April 1992, McPherson dropped his suit against Starr and released a statement recanting his previous allegations stating, "[The New Kids] did sing lead on their vocals".

By the time the lip-synching allegations surfaced, the group was starting to experience a backlash. Despite their success, the group was regularly dismissed by critics for their attempts to promote themselves as an urban act and their practice of using backing vocals for live performances. The group's record sales also began to decline due to a shift in musical tastes to gangsta rap and grunge music.

=== 1993–2008: Face the Music and split ===
In 1993, after having split from Maurice Starr, the group shortened their name to the initialism NKOTB. In January 1994, their fourth studio album, Face the Music, was released. Their first studio album in close to four years, Face the Music was a musical departure from the group's previous efforts. Nearly all the songs were written and/or co-produced by the group. In spite of some positive critical reception, the album failed to live up to commercial expectation. The album's final single to chart was "Dirty Dawg" (which featured a rap cameo by Nice & Smooth), peaking at No. 66 on the Billboard Hot 100. The follow-up single, "Never Let You Go", failed to chart in the U.S., but did reach No. 42 in the UK Singles Chart and No. 18 in the Canadian charts.

NKOTB went on tour to support the album, playing smaller venues such as clubs and theaters, as opposed to the arenas and stadiums they were once accustomed to. After experiencing increased panic attacks and anxiety, Jonathan Knight left the band. Shortly thereafter, the remaining four decided to officially disband the group.

After the group's split, most of the group members started families and began to venture into other avenues. Jonathan Knight and Danny Wood maintained low profiles, while the other three continued their careers individually. Wahlberg, in particular, followed his younger brother Mark into an acting career. McIntyre and Jordan Knight recorded solo albums in 1999. In 1999, MTV attempted to reunite the group and get them to perform on that year's VMAs. All of the members were on board for the project, except Jonathan. Without him, the performance did not happen. In 2004, Aamer Haleem, host of VH1's Bands Reunited, also attempted to convince each of the members of New Kids on the Block to reunite for a one-night performance for the show. This time Jonathan agreed. However, McIntyre, Wahlberg, and Wood all declined. While Wood and Wahlberg declined on-camera interviews, McIntyre cited that the only way he would perform with the band was if the group would make the decision to reunite permanently, which didn't happen until April 2008.

=== 2008–2013: Reunion, The Block and NKOTBSB ===
In April 2008, after months of speculation, Wahlberg confirmed to CNN that the group had reunited with plans to record new material and to stage a tour. The following month, the group released their first single since reuniting, "Summertime". The cover of the single featured the name "New Kids on the Block", re-lengthened from the initials NKOTB.

On August 12, 2008, they released their second single, "Single", featuring R&B singer Ne-Yo, followed by the release of the group's first studio album in fourteen years, The Block. The album debuted at No. 1 on the Billboard Top Pop Albums Chart and No. 2 on the Billboard 200 in September 2008. It was certified Gold in October 2008, in Canada.

The group's reunion tour, New Kids on the Block: Live, began at Toronto's Air Canada Centre on September 18, 2008. They toured the US with Natasha Bedingfield and Lady Gaga as supporting acts. There were 48 total concerts scheduled for Canada and the United States, nine in the United Kingdom, one in Ireland, one in France, one in Amsterdam, Netherlands and two in Germany. A NKOTB-sponsored "theme" concert cruise (for their fans) departed from Miami, Florida and traveled to the Bahamas from May 15–18, 2009. The group also announced the Full Service Tour for 2009, featuring Jesse McCartney and Jabbawockeez.

Group member Jordan Knight announced a new concert cruise for 2010. After the tour, each member took a break on doing other endeavors. McIntyre recorded a few songs written and produced by fellow musicians such as himself, Drew Ryan Scott from boy band After Romeo, Brent Paschke, and Gabe Lopez. Wahlberg worked on his own music as well, releasing a single called "I Got It" featuring Aubrey O'Day (formerly from Danity Kane) and "Rise and Grind" featuring Roscoe Umali.

On Friday, August 13, 2010, tickets went on sale for the third annual NKOTB cruise which would take place aboard the Carnival Destiny, leaving from Miami, FL on Thursday, May 12, 2011, to Nassau and Half Moon Cay, Bahamas and returning to Miami, FL on Monday, May 16, 2011. Once again, the cruise sold out the same day it went on sale, with thousands of fans on a 'waitlist' standing by for any openings on the boat due to cancellations.

On August 18, 2010, an 'unofficial' announcement was made that NKOTB and the Backstreet Boys would be touring together in 2011 after the successful surprise collaboration performance at Radio City Music Hall on June 19, 2010. On October 8, 2010, Brian Littrell, a member of the Backstreet Boys, gave the tour a 78% chance of happening. He also stated that he and Wahlberg had been working on songs together.

On November 3, 2010, an official announcement was made that NKOTB and BSB would be touring together in the summer of 2011 along with Jordin Sparks and Ashlyne Huff. In May 2011, Matthew Morrison confirmed during an interview on talk show Chelsea Lately that he would also be joining the tour. The NKOTBSB Tour began on May 25, 2011, and ended in June 2012. They also released a compilation album NKOTBSB which included 2 new songs.

On June 22, 2012, NKOTB was among 24 celebrities selected by the Hollywood Chamber of Commerce to receive a star on the Hollywood Walk of Fame for 2013.

McIntyre stated during Summer Mixtape Festival that they were making a new album and unlike their previous album The Block, there will be no collaboration on it.

=== 2013–2024: 10, Thankful, and Battle of Boston with New Edition ===
On January 22, 2013, the group appeared on The View and announced that they were going to release a new single titled "Remix (I Like The)" on January 28 and a new album titled 10 on April 2, 2013, via Kobalt Label Services. During the show, they also announced that they were going to tour North America with 98 Degrees and Boyz II Men as their opening acts in summer 2013. 10 was released on April 2, 2013, and received mixed to positive reviews from music critics. The group appeared on various television series to promote the album including The Today Show, The View, and an iHeartRadio concert release party. The album debuted at number 6 on the Billboard 200 chart, marking their 5th top 10 studio album in the US. The group performed on the Boston Strong telethon alongside Boyz II Men on May 30, 2013.

On February 3, 2014, the band announced their European Tour 2014. The official website described the tour: 'Kicking-off at the Annex in Stockholm on May 6 and culminating at Clyde Auditorium in Glasgow on June 1, the shows will take place at some of the most intimate venues across Europe, giving our fans a rare opportunity to get up-close-and-personal with the band.' Following the tour the group met up in New York to embark on the 6th annual NKOTB Cruise. Also, in the Spring of 2014 they announced a limited engagement in Las Vegas. The show entitled New Kids on the Block After Dark ran for 4 consecutive nights from July 10–13, 2014 at The AXIS at Planet Hollywood.

On October 9, 2014, the group received their star on the Hollywood Walk of Fame.

In January 2015, the group announced they would be embarking on a summer tour called The Main Event, with TLC and Nelly. They also starred on Pop's Rock This Boat: New Kids on the Block, a reality television series featuring the band on a cruise to Bermuda. The show was renewed for a second season the following year.

The group played themselves on an episode of the second season of Fuller House entitled "New Kids in the House", where they performed multiple songs including "The Right Stuff" and "Please Don't Go Girl" as well as singing "Happy Birthday" to DJ Tanner to mark her 39th birthday. The episode was released on December 9, 2016.

In November 2016, the group announced a new tour called The Total Package Tour with Paula Abdul & Boyz II Men. The 44-city North American tour spanned May 12 through July 16 and marked Abdul's first tour in more than 20 years. In March 2017 during an appearance on The Late Late Show with James Corden they performed the new single "One More Night" from the EP Thankful, which was released on May 12 to coincide with the start of the tour.

In December 2017, they released an expanded version of the EP entitled Thankful (Unwrapped), now including the Target-only track "We Were Here" (featuring DMX) as well as three newly recorded holiday songs, their first new material of holiday music in 28 years. Additionally, they announced a short-film documentary filmed during their summer tour will be released on December 9.

In October 2018, New Kids announced their MixTape Tour, which would include 1980s and 1990s stars such as Salt-N-Pepa, Naughty by Nature, Debbie Gibson, and Tiffany. It was to run from May 2, 2019, in Cincinnati, Ohio, through July 14 in Hollywood, Florida. On December 13, 2018, New Kids announced they would perform at Dick Clark's New Year's Rockin' Eve 2019 in Times Square.

On March 2, 2019, New Kids released a new music video "Boys in the Band (Boy Band Anthem)", which included cameos from Lance Bass, Debbie Gibson, Naughty by Nature, as well as Ricky Bell, Michael Bivins, and Ronnie DeVoe of New Edition. It also included shout outs and easter eggs to several boy bands throughout the years: The Osmonds, Jackson 5, New Edition, Boyz II Men, Bell Biv DeVoe, Backstreet Boys, B2K, 98°, LFO, Menudo, JLS, O-Town, BTS, NSYNC, One Direction, Take That, and Westlife, as well as New Kids themselves.

On May 2, 2019, the Mixtape Tour began in Cincinnati, Ohio, with New Kids as the headliners. Other performers on the tour include Salt-N-Pepa, Debbie Gibson, Tiffany, and Naughty by Nature. In 2020, during the COVID-19 pandemic, NKOTB released the single "House Party" which peaked at number five on Billboard's Digital Songs chart. The song featured Naughty by Nature, Boyz II Men, Big Freedia and Jordin Sparks. On August 6, 2021, New Kids on the Block played a concert at Fenway Park in Boston with special guest Bell Biv Devoe and surprise guest D-Nice, as well as Joey's son Griffin McIntyre.

On March 3, 2022, NKOTB uploaded the music video "Bring Back the Time", which features Salt-N-Pepa, Rick Astley, and En Vogue. Directed by John Asher, the video parodies 1980s music videos such as Journey's "Separate Ways (Worlds Apart)", Devo's "Whip It", A Flock of Seagulls' "I Ran (So Far Away)", Talking Heads' "Once in a Lifetime", Twisted Sister's "We're Not Gonna Take It", Robert Palmer's "Addicted to Love", Billy Idol's "Flesh for Fantasy", Madonna's "Vogue", Duran Duran's "Rio", Toni Basil's "Mickey", Art of Noise featuring Max Headroom's "Paranoimia", and Michael Jackson's "Beat It".

=== 2024–present: Still Kids, Magic Summer Tour, and Las Vegas residency ===
In March 2024, the group announced that their eighth album, Still Kids, would be released on May 17, 2024. The album is the group's first in eleven years and was preceded by the first single and music video for "Kids" on March 5, 2024. The group, along with opening acts Paula Abdul and DJ Jazzy Jeff, embarked on The Magic Summer Tour (2024) in June 2024.

On June 20th, 2025, the group kicked off their first Las Vegas residency, named New Kids on The Block: The Right Stuff Las Vegas Residency at Dolby Live at Park MGM, with dates spanning until February 2026. The show has been met with positive reviews, noting the mix of concert and Las Vegas style blend.

On March 14, 2026, the group held a special headline halftime performance at the inaugural home opener of the Boston Legacy FC at Gillette Stadium against NJ/NY Gotham FC.

== Members ==
=== Current ===
- Jordan Knight – primary lead vocals, background vocals (1984–1994, 2008–present)
- Donnie Wahlberg – co-secondary lead vocals, rapping, background vocals (1984–1994, 2008–present)
- Joey McIntyre – co-secondary lead vocals, background vocals (1985–1994, 2008–present)
- Danny Wood – tertiary lead vocals, background vocals (1984–1994, 2008–present)
- Jonathan Knight – tertiary lead vocals, background vocals (1984–1994, 2008–present)

=== Former ===
- Jamie Kelly (1984)
- Mark Wahlberg (1984)

== Discography ==
Studio albums

- New Kids on the Block (1986)
- Hangin' Tough (1988)
- Merry, Merry Christmas (1989)
- Step by Step (1990)
- Face the Music (1994)
- The Block (2008)
- 10 (2013)
- Still Kids (2024)

== Filmography ==
=== Videos ===
- Hangin' Tough (1989)
- Step by Step (1990)

=== TV specials ===
New Kids on the Block: Live from New York: A 1990 PPV special filmed at Nassau Coliseum on March 15, 1990 during the 1990 leg of the Hangin Tough Tour.

Another No More Games Tour PPV special was filmed in Providence, Rhode Island on December 6 and 7, 1990.

New Kids on the Block: Magic Summer Tour (1990): A PPV special filmed at the Florida Suncoast Dome during NKOTB's 1990 Magic Summer Tour in St. Petersburg, Florida on August 11, 1990.

New Kids on the Block at Disney MGM Studios: Wildest Dreams (1991) A concert special filmed at Walt Disney World's Disney MGM Studios and features New Kids on the Block as they explore their dreams. Jon dreams about being a movie star, Joey dreams about doing song and dance, Jordan dreams about playing 1 on 1 basketball with NBA legend Kareem Abdul-Jabbar, Danny dreams about being strong and healthy, and Donnie dreams about being a stuntman.

== Tours ==
=== Headlining ===
- Hangin' Tough Tour (1988–90)
- The Magic Summer Tour (1990)
- No More Games Tour (1990–92)
- Face the Music Tour (1994)
- New Kids on the Block Live (2008–09)
- Full Service Tour (2009)
- Casi-No Tour (2010)
- South America and Mexico Tour (2012)
- An Intimate Evening with New Kids on the Block (2014)
- The Magic Summer Tour (2024)

=== Co-headlining ===
- NKOTBSB Tour (with Backstreet Boys) (2011–12)
- The Package Tour (with 98 Degrees and Boyz II Men) (2013)
- The Main Event (with TLC and Nelly) (2015)
- Total Package Tour (with Boyz II Men and Paula Abdul) (2017)
- Mixtape Tour (with Salt-N-Pepa, Naughty by Nature, Tiffany and Debbie Gibson) (2019)
- Mixtape Tour (with Salt-N-Pepa, Rick Astley, and En Vogue) (2022)

=== Residencies ===
- New Kids on the Block: The Right Stuff (2025–26)

== Awards and nominations ==
Year	Association	Category	Nominated work	Result	Ref.
1990	Grammy Awards	Best Music Video, Long Form	"Hangin' Tough"	Nominated	
1990	American Music Awards	Favorite Pop/Rock Band/Duo/Group		Won	
1990	American Music Awards	Favorite Pop/Rock Album	Hangin' Tough	Won	
1991	American Music Awards	Favorite Pop/Rock Band/Duo/Group		Nominated	
1990	Billboard Music Awards	No. 1 Pop Artist		Won	
1989	Boston Music Awards	Outstanding R&B Single	You Got It (The Right Stuff)	Won	
1989	Boston Music Awards	Outstanding Video	You Got It (The Right Stuff)	Won	
1990	Boston Music Awards	Act of the Year		Won	
1990	Boston Music Awards	Outstanding Pop/Rock Single	I'll Be Loving You (Forever)	Won	
1990	Boston Music Awards	Outstanding Video	Hangin' Tough	Won	
1991	Boston Music Awards	Act of the Year		Won	
1991	Boston Music Awards	Outstanding Pop Single	Step by Step	Won	
1991	Boston Music Awards	Outstanding Video	Step by Step	Won	
2008	Boston Music Awards	Act of the Year (National)		Won	
1989	MTV Video Music Awards	Best Choreography in a Video	You Got It (The Right Stuff)	Nominated	
1990	Nickelodeon Kids' Choice Awards	Favorite Male Musician/Group		Won	
1990	Nickelodeon Kids' Choice Awards	Favorite Song	Hangin' Tough	Won	
1990	Nickelodeon Kids' Choice Awards	Favorite Song	Step by Step	Nominated	
1992	Smash Hits Poll Winners Party	Best Group In The World		Nominated	
1992	Smash Hits Poll Winners Party	Best Single	If You Go Away	Nominated	
1992	Smash Hits Poll Winners Party	Best Video	If You Go Away	Nominated	
1992	Smash Hits Poll Winners Party	Worst Group		Won	
2008	Virgin Media Music Awards	Best Comeback		Nominated	
