= 10 (New Kids on the Block album) =

2013 studio album

Studio album by New Kids on the Block
- Released: April 2, 2013
- Genre: Pop; dance-pop; pop rock
- Length: 49:10
- Label: The Block/Boston Five
- Producer: Deekay; Brent Paschke; Gabe Lopez

New Kids on the Block chronology
The Block (2008)	10 (2013)	Thankful (2017)

Singles from 10
- 1. "Remix (I Like The)" Released: January 28, 2013; 2. "The Whisper" Released: August 1, 2013

10 is the seventh studio album by American boy band New Kids on the Block. It was released on April 2, 2013. This is the band's first studio album since 2008's The Block, as well as their first album released independently after departing from Interscope Records. The album title refers to it being their tenth album release in the US (including compilation albums). The album made its debut on the Billboard 200 at number 6, number 1 on the Top Independent Albums and number 8 on the Canadian albums chart.

== Background and development ==
On January 22, 2013, the group appeared on The View and announced that they would release a new single titled "Remix (I Like The)" on January 28, and a new album titled 10 would be released on April 2, 2013. During the show, they also announced that they would tour with 98 Degrees and Boyz II Men as their opening acts in summer 2013. On February 6, the band released the official track listing for the album's standard edition on their official website.

They released the second single, "The Whisper" on August 1, 2013. The video features footage from The Package Tour.

== Reception ==
=== Critical reception ===
The album received mixed reviews from critics. Review aggregator Metacritic gave the album a score of 52 out of 100, indicating mixed or average reviews. The Huffington Post gave the album a positive review, complimenting its modern tastes, swaying hooks, and sensitive lyrics. Artistdirect gave the album 5 out of 5 stars, stating that the album feels unequivocally and undeniably "new". AllMusic reviewer Stephen Thomas Erlewine gave the album three stars out of five, calling it cleanly produced, tuneful, middle-of-the road pop. A negative review came from Idolator reviewer Mike Wass, who criticized the album's outdated dance pop and overwrought ballads, giving the album 2.5 out of 5 stars.

=== Commercial performance ===
The album debuted at number 6 on the Billboard 200 in the United States, becoming the group's sixth top 10 ten album. 10 sold 51,000 copies in its first week, New Kids on the Block's second-best first-week sales since Nielsen SoundScan began tracking sales in 1991.

== Track listing ==
All songs produced by Deekay, except "Back to Life" and "Now or Never" produced by Brent Paschke, Gabe Lopez and Drew Ryan Scott.

10 track listing
No.	Title	Writer(s)	Lead vocals	Length
1.	"We Own Tonight"	Lars Halvor Jensen; Johannes Jørgensen; Daniel Klein; J.B. Gill	Joey McIntyre; Jordan Knight; Jonathan Knight; Donnie Wahlberg	3:20
2.	"Remix (I Like The)"	Jensen; Jørgensen; Lemar Obika	Wahlberg; McIntyre	3:18
3.	"Take My Breath Away"	Jørgensen; James Fauntleroy; Oritsé Williams	Jordan Knight; McIntyre; Wahlberg	4:01
4.	"Wasted on You"	Thomas Andersson; Tim McEwan	Jordan Knight; McIntyre; Wahlberg	3:38
5.	"Fighting Gravity"	Jensen; Jørgensen; Jess Cates	Jordan Knight; McIntyre; Wahlberg; Danny Wood	4:06
6.	"Miss You More"	Walhlberg; Jensen; Jørgensen	Jordan Knight; Wahlberg (small; (rap)	4:03
7.	"The Whisper"	Jørgensen; Andy Love; Marcus Winther-John	Jordan Knight; McIntyre; Wahlberg	4:42
8.	"Jealous (Blue)"	Jensen; Martin Michael Larsson; Jamie Scott	Jordan Knight; McIntyre; Wahlberg	3:22
9.	"Crash"	Jensen; Larsson; Marlin "Hookman" Bonds	Jordan Knight; McIntyre, Wahlberg; Wood	4:08
10.	"Back to Life"	McIntyre; Gabe LopezBrent Paschke; Drew Ryan Scott	Jordan Knight; McIntyre; Wahlberg	3:44
11.	"Now or Never"	McIntyre; Lopez; Paschke; Scott	Jordan Knight; McIntyre; Wahlberg; Wood	3:28
12.	"Survive You"	Jensen; Larsson; Marvin Humes; Aston Merrygold; Nina Woodford	Jordan Knight; Jonathan Knight; McIntyre; Wahlberg; Wood	7:16
13.	"Let's Go Out With a Bang" (hidden track at 3:43)		McIntyre; Wood (speech); Jordan Knight

iTunes bonus tracks
No.	Title	Writer(s)	Length
13.	"Block Party"	McInytyre; Wahlberg; Paschke; Lopez	4:41

Target bonus tracks
No.	Title	Writer(s)	Length
13.	"She's a Killer"	Jørgensen; Jared Lee	3:33
14.	"With Me"	Jørgensen; Klein; Leon James; Tommy Lee James	3:34

- Credits adapted from AllMusic.

== Charts ==
Chart performance for 10
Chart (2013)	Peak position
Australian Albums (ARIA)	59
Belgian Albums (Ultratop Flanders)	129
Canadian Albums (Billboard)	8
Danish Albums (IFPI)	21
Dutch Albums (MegaCharts)	39
German Albums (Media Control Charts)	45
Japanese Albums (Oricon)	91
Scottish Albums (OCC)	61
Spanish Albums (Promusicae)	80
UK Albums (OCC)	47
UK Independent Albums (OCC)	9
US Billboard 200	6
US Independent Albums (Billboard)	1
