= Remix (I Like The) =

Single by New Kids on the Block

from the album 10
- Released: January 28, 2013
- Genre: Pop rock; synthpop
- Length: 3:16
- Label: The Block/Boston Five
- Songwriters: Lars Halvor Jensen; Johannes Jørgensen; Lemar Obika
- Producer: Deekay

New Kids on the Block singles chronology
| "Don't Turn Out the Lights" (2011) | "Remix (I Like The)" (2013) | "The Whisper" (2013) |

Music video
- "Remix (I Like The)" on YouTube

"Remix (I Like The)" is a song by American pop group New Kids on the Block from their sixth studio album, 10. The song was released as the album's lead single on January 28, 2013. "Remix (I Like The)" was written by Lars Halvor Jensen, Johannes Jørgensen, and Lemar, and it was produced by Deekay. The song features Donnie Wahlberg and Joey McIntyre on lead vocals.

"Remix (I Like The)" did not enter the Billboard Hot 100 in the United States, becoming their first lead single to fail charting since "Be My Girl" (1986). However, the song did peak at number 38 on the Adult Top 40 chart. It also reached number 81 on the Canadian Hot 100 chart and number 35 on the UK Independent Singles Chart.

== Music video ==
The song's music video was directed by Rami Hachache. It tells the story of "lonely and awkward wallflower" SunnyD, (played by Artemis Pebdani) who blossoms after hearing new music by house band NKOTB at a dance party. Donnie Wahlberg explained to MTV News: "The story of the video is about, it's about someone becoming at peace with their inner beauty. Some people might hear the song and think it's obvious what it might be for the video. Maybe it's about a beautiful girl walking down the runway or a guy stopping and gawking at a beautiful girl, but it's about someone who feels beautiful with who they are and is willing to celebrate that for all the world to see."

== Critical reception ==
PopCrush gave the song 3.5 stars out of five. In her review Jessica Sager wrote, "The song sounds like an adult contemporary answer to The Wanted mixed with Bruno Mars‘ ‘Locked Out of Heaven.’ It has a danceable beat like many of the British bad boys’ tracks, but is stripped down and raw enough to pass for Mars’ latest radio smash as well." Carl Williott of Idolator commended the song's chorus, but criticized its "liberal use of Auto-Tune" and compared Donnie Wahlberg's vocals to Chad Kroeger.

== Track listing ==
- Digital download
1. "Remix (I Like The)" – 3:16

== Chart performance ==
On the week of February 16, 2013, the song debuted and peaked at number 81 on the Canadian Hot 100 before leaving the next week. It reappeared at number 85 on the week of June 22 before leaving the chart completely.

| Chart (2013) | Peak position |
|---|---|
| Canada Hot 100 (Billboard) | 81 |
| UK Independent (Official Charts) | 35 |
| US Adult Pop Airplay (Billboard) | 38 |
