= Hangin' Tough =

Studio album by New Kids on the Block
- Released: August 12, 1988
- Recorded: 1987–1988
- Studios: Mission Control (Westford, Massachusetts); The House of Hits (Boston, Massachusetts); Normandy Sound Recording Studio (Warren, Rhode Island)
- Genres: Pop; R&B; dance-pop; pop rock; bubblegum pop
- Length: 42:02
- Label: Columbia
- Producer: Maurice Starr

New Kids on the Block chronology
New Kids on the Block (1986)	Hangin' Tough (1988)	Merry, Merry Christmas (1989)

Singles from Hangin' Tough
- 1. "Please Don't Go Girl" Released: April 16, 1988; 2. "You Got It (The Right Stuff)" Released: November 7, 1988; 3. "I'll Be Loving You (Forever)" Released: April 10, 1989; 4. "Hangin' Tough" Released: July 3, 1989; 5. "Cover Girl" Released: August 22, 1989

Hangin' Tough is the second studio album by American boy band New Kids on the Block, released on August 12, 1988, by Columbia Records. It is widely regarded as the group's breakthrough album, gaining positive reviews for their musical transition from bubblegum pop to urban contemporary, blended with popular rock music. The group's label had planned to end their contract when their 1986 debut garnered little commercial and critical attention, which nearly led to their breakup. However, Maurice Starr, the group's producer, diligently persuaded the label to let them record a second album.

Hangin' Tough led the group to success due to the emergence of their music to radio airplay and creation of music videos for each released single, showcasing the group's visual appeal. Their popularity was eventually built as they made TV appearances and embarked on promotional tours. By the end of 1989, the album topped the US Billboard 200 charts, while it peaked at number two on the Canadian Albums Chart that year and the UK Albums Chart the following year. The record has a home-media video release entitled New Kids on the Block: Hangin' Tough, which is a documentary musical film about the group's biographical career, released in 1989. It also contains a series of music videos, live performances, and exclusive interviews from the group and their fans. The album and film received accolades: two American Music Awards and at least one Grammy Award nomination.

With sales of more than fifteen million copies worldwide, Hangin' Tough became the group's best-selling album and was certified Diamond in Canada by the Canadian Recording Industry Association (CRIA), with sales of more than one million units, and 8× Platinum in the U.S. by the Recording Industry Association of America (RIAA), making it the country's second-best-selling album of 1989, behind Bobby Brown's Don't Be Cruel. The record spawned five commercial singles: "Please Don't Go Girl", "You Got It (The Right Stuff)", "I'll Be Loving You (Forever)", "Hangin' Tough", and "Cover Girl". All were top-ten hits on the Billboard Hot 100 chart, making NKOTB the first teen act to gain such chart success. An album titled More Hangin' Tough, which included remixed and instrumental versions of the original songs, was issued in Japan. Following the 2019 release of the 30th Anniversary Edition of the album, which contains remixes of previous singles plus three newly recorded songs, the record re-entered the US Billboard 200 chart at number 18.

== Singles ==
Five singles were released from Hangin' Tough, starting with "Please Don't Go Girl", which came out in April 1988. The song was a major hit on radio stations nationwide and became the group's first top-ten single on the Billboard Hot 100, peaking at number ten. The second single was "You Got It (The Right Stuff)", a worldwide hit that peaked at number three on the Billboard charts. "I'll Be Loving You (Forever)", a ballad, was the third single and became NKOTB's first number-one on the Billboard Hot 100. The title track was released next and also reached number one. "Cover Girl" was the fifth released; it peaked at number two.

"My Favorite Girl" was issued in January 1990 as a promotional single sent to radio but was not made commercially available at retail.

== Critical reception ==
Professional ratings
Review scores
Source	Rating
AllMusic	4/5 stars
Robert Christgau	C+

The album received positive reviews from music critics. Dan Heilman and Bil Carpenter of AllMusic wrote, "Good songs collected by New Kids mastermind Maurice Starr highlight this smash, including 'I'll Be Loving You (Forever)', 'You Got It (The Right Stuff)', 'Please Don't Go Girl', and the title track. Tight, warm, even soulful harmony on the ballads."

Robert Christgau gave the album a C+ grade. He stated that:

At five million and counting, this isn't the rank offense its demographic tilt would lead you to expect—auteur Maurice Starr has positioned two exceedingly cute up-tempo hits atop two overly balladic sides. Really, why shouldn't a black svengali mastermind the safe white R&B ripoff for once? Funkier than the Osmonds or Milli Vanilli. As hip as New Edition.

== Accolades ==
Hangin' Tough won two American Music Awards in January 1990 for Favorite Pop/Rock Album and Favorite Pop/Rock Band/Duo/Group, beating Paula Abdul's Forever Your Girl and Bobby Brown's Don't Be Cruel in the Favorite Pop/Rock Album category, and Bon Jovi and Milli Vanilli in the Favorite Pop/Rock Band/Duo/Group category. The Hangin' Tough music film was nominated for a Grammy Award for Best Music Video, Long Form (now called Best Music Film) at the 1990 Grammy Awards but lost to Rhythm Nation 1814 by Janet Jackson, beating Eurythmics's Savage, Michael Jackson's Moonwalker, and Pink Floyd's Delicate Sound of Thunder.

== Track listing ==
All songs written and produced by Maurice Starr, except where noted.

Hangin' Tough track listing
No.	Title	Writer(s)	Lead vocals	Length
1.	"You Got It (The Right Stuff)"		Jordan Knight; Donnie Wahlberg	4:13
2.	"Please Don't Go Girl"		Joey McIntyre; Jordan Knight; Danny Wood	4:31
3.	"I'll Be Loving You (Forever)"		Jordan Knight	4:28
4.	"Cover Girl"		Donnie Wahlberg	4:08
5.	"I Need You"		Donnie Wahlberg	3:38
6.	"Hangin' Tough"		Donnie Walhberg	4:18
7.	"I Remember When"	Starr; Eban Kelly; Jimmy Randolph	Joey McIntyre	4:13
8.	"What'cha Gonna Do (About It)"		Jordan Knight; Donnie Wahlberg; Danny Wood; Joey McIntyre	3:59
9.	"My Favorite Girl"	Starr; Jordan Knight; Donnie Wahlberg; Danny Wood	Jordan Knight; Danny Wood	5:33
10.	"Hold On"		Danny Wood	3:39

More Hangin' Tough
No.	Title	Length
1.	"Please Don't Go Girl" (remix)	4:43
2.	"You Got It (The Right Stuff)" (12-inch version)	5:16
3.	"You Got It (The Right Stuff)" (7-inch remix version)	3:36
4.	"You Got It (The Right Stuff)" (instrumental)	5:17
5.	"I'll Be Loving You (Forever)" (12-inch version)	5:24
6.	"I'll Be Loving You (Forever)" (More 7-inch remix version)	3:41
7.	"I'll Be Loving You (Forever)" (instrumental)	4:12
8.	"Hangin' Tough" (7-inch remix)	3:51
9.	"Hangin' Tough" (Tougher Mix)	4:40
10.	"Cover Girl" (7-inch version)	4:07
11.	"Whatcha Gonna Do About It" (dub mix)	5:28

30th anniversary version (bonus tracks)
No.	Title	Writer(s)	Producer(s)	Length
11.	"Please Don't Go Girl" (extended version)			4:44
12.	"You Got It (The Right Stuff)" (7" version)			3:34
13.	"I'll Be Loving You" (More 7" remix version)			3:43
14.	"Hangin' Tough" (Tougher Mix)			4:37
15.	"Cover Girl" (7" remix)			4:06
16.	"80s Baby" (featuring Salt-N-Pepa, Naughty by Nature, Tiffany, Debbie Gibson)	Keir Gist; Lars Halvor Jensen; Terence Abney; Marcella Brailsford; Michael Jones; Donnie Wahlberg; Cito Crandle	KayGee; Trampbaby	3:37
17.	"Boys in the Band (Boy Band Anthem)"	Gist; Jensen; Abney; Brailsford; D. Wahlberg; Addaryll Wilson	Trampbaby; Illtown Sluggaz	3:10
18.	"The Way"	Gist; Jensen; Abney; Stevie Wonder; D. Wahlberg; Hagen Dierks; Eric Andrew Hall; Patrick Francois Arondel	Trampbaby; Illtown Sluggaz; Hall	3:22

== Personnel ==
New Kids on the Block

- Jonathan Knight – lead and backing vocals
- Jordan Knight – lead and backing vocals, associate producer
- Joey McIntyre – lead and backing vocals
- Donnie Wahlberg – lead and backing vocals, associate producer
- Danny Wood – lead and backing vocals, programming, associate producer, recording, mixing, engineer

Additional personnel

- Cecil Holmes – executive producer
- Maurice Starr – arranger, producer, recording, mixing, engineer, acoustic guitar, electric guitar, keyboards, synthesizers, electric bass, drum programming
- Phil Greene – recording, mixing, engineer
- Richard Mendelson – recording, mixing, engineer
- Hediki Sunada – recording, mixing, engineer

== Charts ==
=== Weekly charts ===
Weekly chart performance for Hangin' Tough
Chart (1988–1990)	Peak position
Australian Albums (ARIA)	7
Austrian Albums (Ö3 Austria Top 40)	8
Canadian Albums (RPM)	2
Dutch Albums (Album Top 100)	33
European Albums Chart	7
Finnish Albums (Suomen virallinen lista)	2
French Albums (SNEP)	43
German Albums (Offizielle Top 100)	4
Icelandic Albums (Tónlist)	7
Japanese Albums (Oricon)	31
New Zealand Albums (RIANZ)	3
Norwegian Albums (VG-lista)	6
Spanish Albums (PROMUSICAE)	27
Swiss Albums (Schweizer Hitparade)	19
UK Albums (OCC)	2
US Billboard 200	1
US Top R&B/Hip-Hop Albums	40

2019 weekly chart performance for Hangin' Tough
Chart (2019)	Peak position
US Billboard 200	18

=== Year-end charts ===
1989 year-end chart performance for Hangin' Tough
Chart (1989)	Position
Australian Albums Chart	28
Canadian Albums Chart	11
UK Albums Chart	69
US Albums Chart	2

1990 year-end chart performance for Hangin' Tough
Chart (1990)	Position
Canadian Albums Chart	17
European Albums (Music & Media)	18
French Albums Chart	60
New Zealand Albums Chart	22
Norwegian Albums Chart (Skoleslutt Period)	7
UK Albums Chart	21
US Albums Chart	13

== Certifications and sales ==
Certifications and sales for Hangin' Tough
Region	Certification	Certified units/sales
Australia (ARIA)	2× Platinum	140,000^{^}
Austria (IFPI Austria)	Gold	25,000^{*}
Canada (Music Canada)	Diamond	1,000,000^{^}
Finland (Musiikkituottajat)	Gold	37,386
Germany (BVMI)	Gold	250,000^{^}
Malaysia	—	40,000
New Zealand (RMNZ)	Platinum	15,000^{^}
United Kingdom (BPI)	2× Platinum	600,000^{^}
United States (RIAA)	8× Platinum	10,000,000
United States (RIAA) Music videocassette	11× Platinum	1,100,000^{^}
United States (RIAA) VHS Hangin' Tough Live	12× Platinum	1,200,000^{^}
Summaries
Worldwide	—	15,000,000
^{*} Sales figures based on certification alone.^{^} Shipments figures based on certification alone.
