= I'll Be Loving You (Forever) =

Single by New Kids on the Block

from the album Hangin' Tough
- B-side: "I Wanna Be Loved By You"
- Released: April 10, 1989
- Recorded: 1988
- Genre: Pop; R&B; blue-eyed soul
- Length: 4:28 (album version); 3:57 (single version)
- Label: Columbia
- Songwriter: Maurice Starr
- Producer: Maurice Starr

New Kids on the Block singles chronology
"You Got It (The Right Stuff)" (1988)	"I'll Be Loving You (Forever)" (1989)	"Hangin' Tough" (1989)

Music video
- "I'll Be Loving You (Forever)" on YouTube

"I'll Be Loving You (Forever)" is a song by American boy band New Kids on the Block, released in April 1989 by Columbia Records as the third single from the group's second album, Hangin' Tough (1988). The song is both written and produced by Maurice Starr, and lead vocals are sung by Jordan Knight. It was the group's first single to reach number one on the US Billboard Hot 100, while peaking at number five in the UK.

"I'll Be Loving You (Forever)" rose from #56 to #41 the week of April 15, 1989 as "You Got It (The Right Stuff)" was descending from the Top 40. The single proved to be a popular single in the early summer of 1989, reaching #1 on June 17, 1989. The ballad boasted 6 weeks in the Top 10, 8 weeks in the Top 20, and 14 weeks in the Top 40.

== Music video ==
Most of the music video for "I'll Be Loving You (Forever)", directed by Doug Nichol, was shot in Xavier High School in New York City. Small parts were filmed on the Williamsburg Bridge and the East River.

== Track listing ==
- Maxi-CD
1. "I'll Be Loving You (Forever)" (7" Version) - 3:54
2. "I'll Be Loving You (Forever)" (12" Version) - 5:25
3. "I'll Be Loving You (Forever)" (More 7" Remix Style) - 3:41
4. "I Wanna Be Loved By You" - 4:56

== Official remixes and versions ==
- "I'll Be Loving You (Forever)" [Album Version] - 4:27
- "I'll Be Loving You (Forever)" [Instrumental] - 4:12
- "I'll Be Loving You (Forever)" [Video Version] 4:21
- "I'll Be Loving You (Forever)" [More 7" Remix Style] - 3:35
- "I'll Be Loving You (Forever)" [More 7" Remix Version] - 3:41
- "I'll Be Loving You (Forever)" [12" Version] - 5:20

== Charts ==
=== Weekly charts ===
Chart (1989–1990)	Peak position
Australia (ARIA)	4
Belgium (Ultratop 50 Flanders)	19
Canada Top Singles (RPM)	17
Europe (Eurochart Hot 100)	15
Europe (European Hit Radio)	48
Ireland (IRMA)	2
Israel (IBA)	36
Luxembourg (Radio Luxembourg)	4
Netherlands (Dutch Top 40)	11
Netherlands (Single Top 100)	8
New Zealand (Recorded Music NZ)	28
Spain Airplay (Top 40 Radio)	38
UK Singles (Official Charts)	5
UK Airplay (Music & Media)	19
US Billboard Hot 100	1
US Adult Contemporary (Billboard)	3
US Hot R&B/Hip-Hop Songs (Billboard)	12
US Cash Box Top 100	5
West Germany (GfK)	31

=== Year-end charts ===
Chart (1989)	Position
Australia (ARIA)	32
Brazil (Crowley)	84
US Billboard Hot 100	26
US Adult Contemporary (Billboard)	41

== Certifications ==
Region	Certification	Certified units/sales
Australia (ARIA)	Gold	35,000^{^}
United States (RIAA)	Gold	500,000^{^}
^{^} Shipments figures based on certification alone.
