= Cover Girl (New Kids on the Block song) =

Single by New Kids on the Block

from the album Hangin' Tough
- B-side: "Merry, Merry Christmas"
- Released: August 22, 1989
- Recorded: 1988
- Genre: Pop
- Length: 4:02
- Label: Columbia
- Songwriter: Maurice Starr
- Producer: Maurice Starr

New Kids on the Block singles chronology
"Hangin' Tough" (1989)	"Cover Girl" (1989)	"This One's for the Children" (1989)

"Cover Girl" is a song by American boy band New Kids on the Block, released in August 1989 by Columbia Records as the fifth and final single from their multi-platinum second studio album, Hangin' Tough (1988). The song is both written and produced by Maurice Starr and lead vocals are sung by Donnie Wahlberg. It peaked at number two on the US Billboard Hot 100 on the week of November 4, being held off from the top spot by Roxette's "Listen to Your Heart". The song became the fifth consecutive top 10 single from the album on the Billboard Hot 100, making NKOTB the first teen act to gain such chart success.

Some of the UK releases of "Cover Girl" released in 1990 included the 7" and 12" remix by Pete Hammond for Pete Waterman Entertainment. The 7" remix was included as a bonus track on the 30th anniversary of "Hangin' Tough".

This song and "Tonight" were covered by South Korean singer Lee Min Woo of boy band Shinhwa in his concert on 14 and 15 January 2006 in Seoul.

== Track listing and formats ==
- UK Promo single
1. "Cover Girl" - 4:02
2. "Cover Girl" (12" Remix) - 6:54
3. "Stop It Girl" - 3:43
4. "I Need You" - 3:36
- UK 7-inch vinyl single

A. "Cover Girl" - 4:02
B. "Stop It Girl" - 3:43

- UK 12-inch vinyl single

A. "Cover Girl" (12" Remix) - 6:54
B1. "Stop It Girl" - 3:43
B2. "I Need You" - 3:36

- US single

A1. "Cover Girl"
A2. "Merry, Merry Christmas"
B1. "Cover Girl"
B2. "Merry, Merry Christmas"

- US 7-inch vinyl single

A. "Cover Girl"
B. "Merry, Merry Christmas"

- US 12-inch vinyl single

A. "Cover Girl" (12" Remix) - 6:54
B1. "I Remember When" - 4:09
B2. "Cover Girl" (Album Version) - 4:02

== Charts ==
=== Weekly charts ===
Chart (1989–1990)	Peak position
Australia (ARIA)	22
Canada Top Singles (RPM)	4
Europe (Eurochart Hot 100)	11
Europe (European Hit Radio)	36
Finland (Suomen virallinen lista)	15
Ireland (IRMA)	6
Israel (IBA)	12
Luxembourg (Radio Luxembourg)	2
New Zealand (Recorded Music NZ)	17
UK Singles (Official Charts)	4
US Billboard Hot 100	2

=== Year-end charts ===
Chart (1989)	Peak position
Canada Top Singles (RPM)	55
US Billboard Hot 100	73

== Certifications and sales ==
Region	Certification	Certified units/sales
Canada (Music Canada)	Platinum	100,000^{^}
United States (RIAA)	Gold	500,000^{^}
^{^} Shipments figures based on certification alone.
