= Please Don't Go Girl =

1988 single by New Kids on the Block

Single by New Kids on the Block

from the album Hangin' Tough
- B-side: "Whatcha Gonna Do About It"
- Released: April 16, 1988
- Recorded: 1988
- Genre: Soul; bubblegum
- Length: 4:13
- Label: Columbia
- Songwriter: Maurice Starr
- Producer: Maurice Starr

New Kids on the Block singles chronology
"Didn't I (Blow Your Mind)" (1986)	"Please Don't Go Girl" (1988)	"You Got It (The Right Stuff)" (1988)

"Please Don't Go Girl" is a 1988 song by American boyband New Kids on the Block. The lead vocals were sung by Joey McIntyre, Jordan Knight, and spoken by Danny Wood, but the majority of the lyrics were sung by Joey McIntyre. Written and produced by Maurice Starr, it was the first release from their second album, Hangin' Tough (1988), and also became the group's first commercial hit. "Please Don't Go Girl" first rose from #62 to #46, on the US Billboard Hot 100 singles chart during the week of July 30, 1988. The single was the first major commercial exposure of the group, resulting in somewhat of a slow, but steady climb. The single eventually peaked at #10 the week of October 8, 1988. In 1997, Aaron Carter covered this song and was featured on his international self-titled debut album.

== Lyrics ==
The song tells about a man who requests a woman he loves not to go away as she is his whole world, and he promises to love her until the end of time.

== Critical reception ==
Pan-European magazine Music & Media described "Please Don't Go Girl" as "slick and smouldering soul, written and produced by Maurice Starr."

== Music video ==
The first available music video for "Please Don't Go Girl" was shot at Coney Island, Brooklyn. However, the group's official website promotes another video that seems to have been recorded around the same time the other video was. This second video was shot in various places around Boston, including the Ruggles T station. The music video features a young Rebecca Romijn as one of the girls.

== Track listings ==
- US 12"

A1. "Please Don't Go Girl" (Extended Mix) – 5:04
A2. "Please Don't Go Girl" (7" Version) – 3:59
B1. "Whatcha Gonna Do About It" (Dub Mix) – 5:28
B2. "Whatcha Gonna Do About It" (7" Version) – 3:55

- UK 12"

A1. "Please Don't Go Girl" (Extended Version) – 4:42
A2. "Please Don't Go Girl" – 3:59
B1. "Whatcha Gonna Do About It" (Dub Mix]) – 5:28
B2. "Whatcha Gonna Do About It" – 3:55

== Versions ==
- "Please Don't Go Girl" (Album Version) – 4:31
- "Please Don't Go Girl" (Remix) – 4:37
- "Please Don't Go Girl" (7" Version) – 4:12
- "Please Don't Go Girl" (Video Version) – 5:23
- "Please Don't Go Girl" (Extended Mix) – 5:05

== Charts ==
Chart (1988–1991)	Peak position
Canada Top Singles (RPM)	77
Spain Airplay (Top 40 Radio)	39
US Billboard Hot 100	10
US Radio & Records CHR/Pop Airplay Chart	10
US Hot R&B/Hip-Hop Songs (Billboard)	55

== Personnel ==
- Danny Wood - Spoken and Background Vocals
- Donnie Wahlberg - Background Vocals
- Joey McIntyre - Lead and Background Vocals
- Jonathan Knight - Background Vocals
- Jordan Knight - Lead and Background Vocals

== Covers ==
- Aaron Carter released a cover of this song on his debut album in 1997.
