= Hangin' Tough (song) =

1989 single by New Kids on the Block

Single by New Kids on the Block

from the album Hangin' Tough
- B-side: "Didn't I (Blow Your Mind This Time)"
- Released: July 3, 1989
- Genre: Pop rock; dance rock; funk rock
- Length: 4:18 (album version); 3:54 (7-inch remix)
- Label: Columbia
- Songwriter: Maurice Starr
- Producer: Maurice Starr

New Kids on the Block singles chronology
"I'll Be Loving You (Forever)" (1989)	"Hangin' Tough" (1989)	"Cover Girl" (1989)

"Hangin' Tough" is a song by American boy band New Kids on the Block, released as a single in July 1989 through Columbia Records. It was the fourth single from the group's second album of the same name (1988). Maurice Starr both wrote and produced the song and lead vocals are sung by Donnie Wahlberg. "Hangin' Tough" peaked at No. 1 on the US Billboard Hot 100 on September 9, 1989, and topped the UK Singles Chart, where it became the first new No. 1 single of the 1990s yet the lowest-selling No. 1 hit up to that point. It is their only No. 1 single in Ireland and reached the top 10 in Australia, Canada, Luxembourg and New Zealand.

== Background ==
There are two distinct renditions of the song: the original album version, which includes a keyboard solo; and the remixed version, which is arguably more recognizable and is commonly included on Greatest Hits albums. The remixed version features a guitar solo and heavier instrumentation.

== Track listings ==
- US, UK, and Dutch 7-inch vinyl

A. "Hangin' Tough" (7-inch remix) – 3:54
B. "Didn't I (Blow Your Mind)" – 4:24

- UK 12-inch vinyl

A1. "Hangin' Tough" (Tougher Mix) – 3:32
B1. "Hangin' Tough" (LP version) – 4:16
B2. "Didn't I (Blow Your Mind)" – 4:24

- UK maxi-CD
1. "Hangin' Tough" (7-inch remix) – 3:54
2. "Hangin' Tough" (Tougher Mix) – 3:32
3. "Didn't I (Blow Your Mind)" – 4:24
- UK 12-inch vinyl

A1. "Hangin' Tough" (Tougher Mix) – 3:32
A2. "What'cha Gonna Do (About It)" – 3:54
B1. "Hangin' Tough" (LP version) – 4:16
B2. "Didn't I (Blow Your Mind)" – 4:24

== Charts ==
=== Weekly charts ===
Chart (1989–1990)	Peak position
Australia (ARIA)	8
Belgium (Ultratop 50 Flanders)	32
Canada Top Singles (RPM)	6
Europe (Eurochart Hot 100)	2
Europe (European Hit Radio)	25
Finland (Suomen virallinen lista)	16
France Airplay (SNEP)	54
Ireland (IRMA)	1
Israel (Israeli Singles Chart)	18
Luxembourg (Radio Luxembourg)	1
Netherlands (Dutch Top 40)	34
Netherlands (Single Top 100)	31
New Zealand (Recorded Music NZ)	7
Norway (VG-lista)	5
Spain Airplay (Top 40 Radio)	24
UK Singles (Official Charts)	1
UK Airplay (Music & Media)	8
US Billboard Hot 100	1
US Cash Box Top 100	2
West Germany (GfK)	29
Zimbabwe (ZIMA)	8

=== Year-end charts ===
Chart (1989)	Position
Australia (ARIA)	75
Canada Top Singles (RPM)	39
US Billboard Hot 100	49

Chart (1990)	Position
Europe (Eurochart Hot 100)	93
UK Singles (OCC)	57

== Certifications and sales ==
Region	Certification	Certified units/sales
Australia (ARIA)	Gold	35,000^{^}
Canada (Music Canada)	Gold	50,000^{^}
United States (RIAA)	Platinum	1,000,000^{^}
^{^} Shipments figures based on certification alone.

== In other media ==
• The song was used in Regular Show season 2, episode 7 “High Score”.

• It was on the soundtrack for The Wizard along with You Got It (The Right Stuff).
