= You Got It (The Right Stuff) =

1988 single by New Kids on the Block

Single by New Kids on the Block

from the album Hangin' Tough
- Released: November 7, 1988
- Genre: R&B; synth-pop; dance-pop
- Length: 4:12
- Label: Columbia
- Songwriter: Maurice Starr
- Producer: Maurice Starr

New Kids on the Block singles chronology
"Please Don't Go Girl" (1988)	"You Got It (The Right Stuff)" (1988)	"I'll Be Loving You (Forever)" (1989)

"You Got It (The Right Stuff)" is a song by American boy band New Kids on the Block, released in November 1988 by Columbia Records as the second single from the band's second album, Hangin' Tough (1988). The lead vocals were sung by Jordan Knight and Donnie Wahlberg. The song peaked at number three on the US Billboard Hot 100. Outside of the United States, "You Got It (The Right Stuff)" topped the charts in Australia and the United Kingdom. On the album, it was simply listed as "The Right Stuff"; the change to the title was likely to avoid confusion with two other songs that charted around the same time: Vanessa Williams' debut hit "The Right Stuff" and Roy Orbison’s posthumous single “You Got It.” A Spanish version of the song was made ("Autentica") and peaked at number 11 in Spain. "You Got It (The Right Stuff)" ranked as number 92 on VH1's "100 Greatest Songs of the '80s".

== Critical reception ==
Upon 1989 reissue in UK William Shaw of Smash Hits left an ironic review on a single, and expressed a doubt that "this song – another one of those jerky thumpy beaty Janet Jackson-ish dance things – will propel them to the fame."

== Chart performance ==
"You Got It" reached the top 40 of the Billboard Hot 100 for the week of January 14, 1989. It reached its peak of number three during the week of March 11, 1989. Altogether, "You Got It (The Right Stuff)" spent 5 weeks in the top 10, 8 weeks in the top 20, and 13 weeks in the top 40. The song was number one in Australia in August 1989, and in the UK (on its second release) in November 1989. On March 29, 1989, the single was certified Gold. "You Got It (The Right Stuff)" is commonly regarded as one of the band's signature songs. In the music video, Jordan Knight is seen wearing a Bauhaus T-shirt.

== In popular culture ==
The song can be heard in the 1989 film The Wizard along with Hangin' Tough. In 1992, "Weird Al" Yankovic parodied the song on his Off the Deep End album as "The White Stuff", a loving ode to the cream filling in Oreo cookies. It was also joked about in the episode "Not All Dogs Go to Heaven" on Family Guy. In a King of the Hill episode, Boomhauer says about a boy band called 4Skore, "You talkin' 'bout that dang ol' boy band, man. Talkin' 'bout prancin' around, ol' 'Oh, oh, oh, oh...'". Kid Rock, on his album The Polyfuze Method, sampled the song on his "Killin' Brain Cells". This song is featured on the game Dance Dance Revolution X2. In the season 8 episode of It's Always Sunny in Philadelphia "Charlie's Mom Has Cancer", Dr. Jinx (Sean Combs) plays the song on his electric bass to help Dennis have feelings again. In an after-credits clip of a season 6 episode of Psych that Joey McIntyre co-starred in, Joey, James Roday and Dulé Hill dance to the song.

In the 2012 Adam Sandler comedy film That's My Boy, the character Todd Peterson (Andy Samberg) receives a tattoo of New Kids on the Block on his back as a child, which later becomes warped as he grows up. Upon discovery of this, his father Donny Berger (Adam Sandler) responds by singing the chorus of "You Got It (The Right Stuff)" with the lyrics changed so that he sings: "Oh, oh, oh, oh, oh, you got a bad tattoo. Oh, oh, oh, oh, oh, their heads are fucking warped."

The song was used by David Wright of the New York Mets as his walk-up song.

In the first episode of Fuller House, DJ, Stephenie, Kimmy, and the rest of the cast dance to a 30-second clip of the song.

The song is featured twice in the 2017 big-screen version of It, based on the Stephen King novel. The song was danced to by Selling Sunset star Chrishell Stause and Gleb Savchenko on "'80s Night" on Dancing with the Stars.

The song is the main theme of "The Right Stuff" segment on ABC's Good Morning America.

In the 2023 animated film Trolls Band Together, the song appears in the medley number Brozone's Back alongside other songs by boy bands. It is sung in the film by *NSYNC member, Justin Timberlake, Eric Andre, Daveed Diggs, playing as their characters John Dory and Spruce.

The band sang this song with Kayko on the finale of Season 22 of American Idol.

== Track listings ==
- CD single CBS, cassette single, vinyl single
1. "You Got It (The Right Stuff)" – 4:09
2. "You Got It (The Right Stuff)" [remix] – 3:32
- 12-inch maxi – US
1. "You Got It (The Right Stuff)" [12" version] – 5:18
2. "You Got It (The Right Stuff)" [7" version] – 3:32
3. "You Got It (The Right Stuff)" [instrumental] – 5:15
- 7-inch single – Europe
1. "You Got It (The Right Stuff)" – 4:09
2. "You Got It (The Right Stuff)" [remix] – 3:32
- 12-inch maxi – Australia
1. "You Got It (The Right Stuff)" [12" version] – 5:18
2. "You Got It (The Right Stuff)" [7" version] – 3:32
3. "You Got It (The Right Stuff)" [instrumental] – 5:15
- 7-inch single – Australia
1. "You Got It (The Right Stuff)" – 4:09
2. "You Got It (The Right Stuff)" [instrumental] – 5:15

== Personnel ==
- Danny Wood – backing vocals
- Donnie Wahlberg – co-lead and backing vocals
- Joey McIntyre – backing vocals
- Jonathan Knight – backing vocals
- Jordan Knight – co-lead and backing vocals

== Charts ==
=== Weekly charts ===
Chart (1988–1990)	Peak position
Australia (ARIA)	1
Austria (Ö3 Austria Top 40)	12
Canada Top Singles (RPM)	36
Europe (Eurochart Hot 100)	9
Europe (European Hit Radio)	35
Finland (Suomen virallinen lista)	4
France (SNEP)	17
France Airplay (SNEP)	2
Ireland (IRMA)	2
Israel (IBA)	15
Luxembourg (Radio Luxembourg)	1
Netherlands (Dutch Top 40)	28
Netherlands (Single Top 100)	32
New Zealand (Recorded Music NZ)	2
Spain (AFYVE)	10
Spain Airplay (Top 40 Radio)	1
UK Singles (Official Charts)	1
UK Airplay (Music & Media)	11
US Billboard Hot 100	3
US Dance Club Songs (Billboard)	20
US Dance Singles Sales (Billboard)	16
US Hot R&B/Hip-Hop Songs (Billboard)	28
West Germany (GfK)	12

=== Year-end charts ===
Chart (1989)	Position
Australia (ARIA)	8
New Zealand (RIANZ)	39
UK Singles (OCC)	17
US Billboard Hot 100	52

Chart (1990)	Position
France Airplay (SNEP)	36
Germany (Media Control)	84

== Certifications ==
Certifications for "You Got It (The Right Stuff)"
Region	Certification	Certified units/sales
Australia (ARIA)	Platinum	70,000^{^}
United Kingdom (BPI)	Gold	400,000^{^}
United States (RIAA)	Gold	500,000^{^}
^{^} Shipments figures based on certification alone.

== Cover versions ==
On the fourth series of The X Factor Australia, contestants the Collective performed this song. The all-female singing group Fifth Harmony performed this song on the October 28, 2014, episode of the MTV series Faking It.
