= The One (Upper Street song) =

2006 single by Upper Street

Single by Upper Street
- Released: 23 October 2006
- Recorded: 2006
- Length: 3:30
- Label: Concept Records

Music video
- "The One" on YouTube

"The One" (also referred to during production as "The One (That Got Away)") is the debut and only single by the British supergroup Upper Street. Formed through the MTV reality television series Totally Boyband, the group consisted of former members of various high-profile 1990s and 2000s pop groups. The single was officially released in the United Kingdom on 23 October 2006 through Concept Records.

Despite considerable promotion on reality television, the single underperformed commercially, peaking at number 35 on the UK Singles Chart. Following its poor chart performance and friction between the group and their record label, Upper Street disbanded shortly after its release.

== Background and recording ==
Upper Street was formed in mid-2006 on the MTV-produced reality series Totally Boyband. The show's premise was to take former members of successful, defunct pop groups and give them a second chance at chart success as a new collective. The final line-up featured Dane Bowers (of Another Level), Jimmy Constable (of 911), Bradley McIntosh (of S Club), Danny Wood (of New Kids on the Block), and Lee Latchford-Evans (of Steps).

During the production of the show, severe internal conflicts arose within the group and with their management, headed by Jonathan Shalit. Prior to the final recording and release of "The One", Latchford-Evans was dismissed from the group following a disagreement. As a result of his firing, "The One" was recorded and completed as a four-piece group without Latchford-Evans's vocals.

== Release and reception ==
Prior to the release, the group members expressed high confidence publicly that the track would achieve a top-ten position on the British charts. "The One" was officially released in the UK on 23 October 2006 across CD and digital formats through Concept Records.

The song received a lukewarm reception from critics and failed to generate the momentum expected from its television backing. It entered the UK Singles Chart on 29 October 2006 at number 35. It ultimately spent only one week on the chart before dropping out completely. However, on the Official Independent Singles Chart, the single fared slightly better, peaking at number 5.

== Aftermath ==
The commercial failure of "The One" caused immediate instability within the group. On 6 November 2006, just over a week after the single debuted on the charts, Teletext's music magazine Planet Sound reported that Upper Street had officially split up following a final confrontation with Concept Records. The group never recorded or released any further material.

== Track listings ==
UK CD Single

1. "The One" (Radio Edit) – 3:30
2. "The One" (Skillz Urban Mix) – 3:26
3. "The One" (Darren Crook Club Mix) – 6:07
4. "The One" (Mark Jason Remix) – 6:08

== Charts ==
Chart (2006)	Peak position
UK Singles (OCC)	35
UK Independent Singles (OCC)	5
