= Cash and Curry (film) =

2008 film by Sarjit Bains

Cash & Curry
- Poster
- Directed by: Sarjit Bains
- Written by: Christine Edwards; Manish Patel
- Produced by: Christine Edwards
- Starring: Ameet Chana; Ronny Jhutti; Pooja Shah; Manish Patel
- Cinematography: Ciro Candia
- Edited by: Sarjit Bains
- Production companies: GhettoVision; Jaffa Entertainment
- Distributed by: 4Digital Media
- Release dates: 13 September 2008 (Portobello Film Festival); 19 July 2010 (United Kingdom)
- Running time: 98 minutes
- Country: United Kingdom
- Language: English

Cash and Curry is a 2008 British independent comedy film directed by Sarjit Bains and written by Christine Edwards and Manish Patel. It was filmed in December 2006 on location in Harrow, Barnet and Wembley.

The film has been premiered at the Portobello Film Festival, Mumbai Film Festival and the Tongues on Fire Film Festival. At the Portobello Film Festival it received the Special Audience Award for Best Feature Film.

It was released on DVD in UK and Ireland by 4 Digital Media on 19 July 2010.

== Cast ==
- Ameet Chana as Raj
- Pooja Shah as Gauri
- Ronny Jhutti as Rohit
- Manish Patel as Gabbar
- Faria Alam as Lakshmi
- Sofia Hayat as Dharmi
- Shaana Diya as Khusmi
- Laurence Stevenson as Isaac
- Peter Peralta as Tony
- Lee Latchford Evans as Casper Warrington-Boothe
- Makosi Musambasi as Ayesha
- Kinga Karolczak as Minjeeta
- Dominique Gozdawa as Anna
- Brian Jackson as Brian
- Alex Liang as Taz
- Andrew Harrison as Tiny
- Sui-Lie 'Jay' Cheung as Micky
- Den Sen 'Sky' Hau as Ricky
- Jose Cuenco Jr. as Ali
- Silas Hawkins as Foodie Husband
- Jamie Bannerman as Tarquin the Skinhead
