= Totally Boyband =

British television series

- Narrated by: Abbie Eastwood
- Country of origin: United Kingdom
- Original language: English
- No. of seasons: 1
- No. of episodes: 8

Production
- Producer: Murphia Productions
- Running time: 30 minutes

Original release
- Network: MTV
- Release: September 17 – November 5, 2006

Related
- Mission Man Band

Totally Boyband is a television programme directed by Ross Norman that aired in the United Kingdom on MTV. The programme debuted on 18 September 2006 and aired on Sunday nights at 21:30 (GMT). The premise centred on the former members of boy bands and pop music bands attempting to regain their former fame by regrouping into a new band called Upper Street. A single called "The One" was released on 23 October 2006, but spent only one week at number 35 after entering the UK Singles Chart on 29 October.

The participants were:

- Dane Bowers (Another Level)
- Jimmy Constable (911)
- Lee Latchford-Evans (Steps)
- Bradley McIntosh (S Club 7)
- Danny Wood (New Kids on the Block)

The single was later recorded without the help of Latchford-Evans, who was sacked by the rest of the band before their debut release due to a disagreement. He described the band's manager in the program, Jonathan Shalit as "two-faced".

It was announced in October 2006, that US music network VH1 would be producing its own version of the show, titled Mission: Man Band with Bryan Abrams (Color Me Badd), Rich Cronin (LFO), Chris Kirkpatrick (*NSYNC) and Jeff Timmons (98 Degrees).
