= Ronny Jhutti =

British actor

Ronny Jhutti (born Ajay Dhutti, 1973) is a British actor, most notable for his role as Sohail Karim in EastEnders, Danny Bartock in two episodes of Doctor Who and Naz Omar in Vexed.

== Early life ==
Ronny was raised in London, where he was born.

== Career ==
He has appeared on television many times, including Shameless, EastEnders, Holby City, Ideal and Doctor Who (season two's "The Impossible Planet"/"The Satan Pit"). Ronny was in the 2008 film Cash and Curry. Ronny is the best friend of Ameet Chana and was cast in the part of Rohit a week before shooting commenced on the film.

Ronny was also a guest star on Totally Doctor Who in 2006 (episode #1.10).

Ronny has a part-time job as a school teacher, most notably at The Westgate School, Slough.

From 2021 to present Ronny is the voice of Adil Shah in The Archers on BBC Radio 4.

== Filmography ==
Year	Title	Role	Notes
1988–1990	EastEnders	Sohail Karim	
	Family Pride	Rashid	
1992	Immaculate Conception	Kamal	
1992	Wild West	Kay	
1994	Moving Story	Asif	Unknown episodes
1995	Bideshi	Raja	
1997	Wing and a Prayer	Wasim	Unknown episodes
1999	Five Seconds to Spare	Ryan	
2000	Melody's Her Second Name	Sandip	
2000	Thin Ice	Restaurant Manager	
2001	The Residents	Jeet Singh	
2001	Always and Everyone	Jay "Ajay" Verma	4 episodes – #3.1, #3.4, #3.11, #3.12
2001	Where the Heart Is	Hussan	16 episodes – The Team – Happiness
2001	Red Cap	Sunil Desai	
2002	Bollywood Queen	Dillip	
2003	Twelfth Night, or What You Will	Sebastian	
2003	Cutting It	Remi Kuluwitharana	4 episodes – #2.1, #2.2, #2.3, #2.4
2003	M.I.T.: Murder Investigation Team	Rafiq Ali	1 episode – The Bigger the Lie
2004	Holby City	Pallav Veer / Ashok Kumar	2 episodes – We'll Meet Again / Knife Edge (1999)
2005	Four Brothers and a Funeral	Ravi	
2005	Meet the Magoons	Imran	1 episode – Stairway to Havan
2006	Judge John Deed	Ronny Bhutto	1 episode – One Angry Man
2006	Ideal	Kuldip	8 episodes – The Seduction - The Stag Do
2006	Banglatown Banquet	Zubin	
2006	Doctor Who	Danny Bartock	2 episodes – The Impossible Planet / The Satan Pit
2006	Nina's Heavenly Delights	Bobbi	
2007	Shameless	Nadia	1 episode - #4.7
2007	Don't Stop Dreaming	Lucky Singh	
2007	Cash and Curry	Rohit	
2010	Vexed	Naz Omar	Series regular
	Diary of a Butterfly	Adi	
2014	Jarhead 2: Field of Fire	Private Khalid Hassan, Afghan National Army	
2016	Ripper Street	Imran Hafeez	1 episode – The Strangers' Home
2016	Holby City	Deepan Rai	
