= King's Leadership Academy Liverpool =

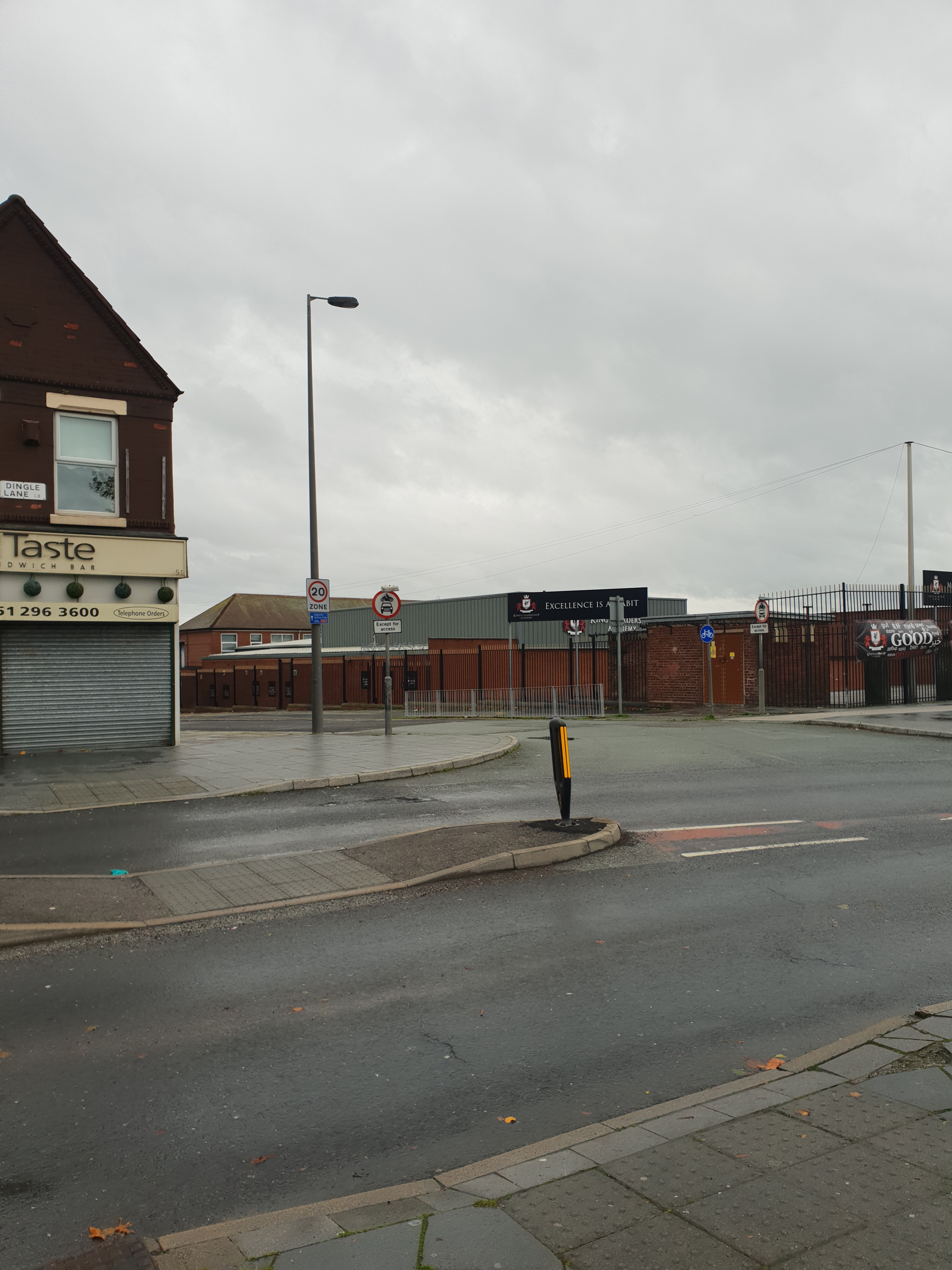

Location
- Dingle Vale; Dingle; Liverpool, Merseyside, L8 9SJ; England
- Coordinates: 53.37822°N 2.95913°W

Information
- Type: Academy
- Trust: Great Schools Trust
- Department for Education URN: 137675 Tables
- Ofsted: Reports
- Principal: Scott Cordon
- Gender: Coeducational
- Age: 11 to 18
- Website: www.kingsliverpool.com

King's Leadership Academy Liverpool (formerly Shorefields School and then University Academy Liverpool) is a coeducational secondary school and sixth form located in the Dingle area of Liverpool, England.

Previously a foundation school administered by Liverpool City Council, Shorefields School converted to academy status in 2012 and was renamed University Academy Liverpool. The school was sponsored by the University of Chester Academies Trust.

In 2014, the schools minister Lord Nash sent a "pre-warning letter" to the trust, saying that "he was concerned about how the trust could make improvements in the long-term", and that "the standards of performance at these three academies [the others being the University of Chester CE Academy and the University of Chester Academy Northwich] are unacceptably low".

In 2015, due to ongoing concerns regarding UCATs sponsorship, low exam grade outcomes, and interim leadership and management, the Department for Education changed the sponsor of University Academy Liverpool to King's Leadership Academy in Warrington (now the Great Schools Trust) who appointed a new principal and leadership team. The school was then renamed King's Leadership Academy Liverpool.

King's Leadership Academy Liverpool offers GCSEs.

As of 2025, the school's most recent inspection by Ofsted was in 2023; this was a short inspection which confirmed the previous 2018 judgement of Good.
