= Upper Street (group) =

British boy band

- Also known as: Totally Boyband (2006)
- Origin: London, England
- Genres: Pop, R&B
- Years active: 2006
- Label: Concept
- Past members: Dane Bowers; Jimmy Constable; Bradley McIntosh; Danny Wood; Lee Latchford-Evans

Upper Street were a UK boy band formed in 2006 from the MTV-produced reality television series Totally Boyband. The members of the group were all ex-members of other groups. They were Dane Bowers of Another Level, Jimmy Constable of 911, Bradley McIntosh of S Club 7, and Danny Wood of New Kids on the Block. Lee Latchford-Evans of Steps was also originally in the line-up, but left due to conflict within the group. Their only single, "The One" was released in the United Kingdom on 23 October 2006 by Concept Records.

Despite the group's confidence that it would place in the top 10, the single entered the charts on 29 October 2006, at number 35. Teletext's Planet Sound reported on 6 November 2006, that the group had split up after confrontation with their record company.

== Discography ==
Singles

List of singles, with selected chart positions
Title	Year	Peak chart positions	Album
Title	Year	UK	Album
"The One"	2006	35	Non-album single
