= Paintball Massacre =

2020 British comedy horror film

- Directed by: Darren Berry
- Written by: Chris Regan
- Produced by: Joe Hallett; Brendan Carr
- Starring: Katy Brand; Lee Latchford-Evans
- Cinematography: Ola Mesmer
- Edited by: Daniel Jewell
- Music by: Patrick Gill
- Release dates: December 2020 (US & Canada); April 15, 2021 (UK)
- Country: United Kingdom
- Language: English

Paintball Massacre is a 2020 British comedy horror film directed by Darren Berry and written by Chris Regan.

== Plot ==
A school reunion paintballing goes wrong as the participants start being murdered one by one.

== Cast ==
- Katy Brand
- Lee Latchford-Evans
- Natasha Killip
- Aoife Smyth
- Nicholas Vince
- Robert Portal
- Ian Virgo
- Cheryl Burniston
- Lockhart Ogilvie
- Nathan Clough

== Production ==
The filmmakers have cited British comedy-horror features Hot Fuzz and Dog Soldiers as inspiration. It was filmed in 2018 in Somerset, at The Sparkford Inn near Yeovil as well as in a quarry in Radstock. The budget for the film was £75,000 which crept up to £100,000 when shooting began.

== Release ==
The film was released in US and Canada in December 2020 and released digitally and on DVD in the UK on April 5, 2021.

== Reception ==
The Guardian review said the film struggles to live up to illustrious Brit comedy-horror predecessors. Dread Central reviewed it as “Fun-Filled Microbudget Mayhem”.
