= Robert Portal =

British actor

- Born: Robert Portal; 1967 or 1968 (age 58–59); England
- Occupation: Actor
- Years active: 1993–present

Robert Portal is an English actor. Portal is known for his role as Paul Critchley on the BBC television series The Amazing Mrs Pritchard (2006) and as the King in the film The Huntsman: Winter's War (2016). He is also known for his role as the Duke of Richmond on the ITV drama series Belgravia (2020).

== Early life ==
Portal was born in England and educated at Harrow School. He studied at the London Academy of Music and Dramatic Art (LAMDA) graduating in 1993 and also trained at the Royal Shakespeare Company.

== Career ==
=== Film ===
Year	Title	Role	Notes
1996	The Merchant of Venice	Arragon	TV movie
1997	Embassy	Rupert Lightfoot	TV movie
1997	Mrs Dalloway	Young Richard	
1997	Painted Lady	Alex	TV movie
1998	Stiff Upper Lips	Cedric	
2001	Bye Bye Baby	Hyphenated	TV movie
2005	The Queen's Sister	Anthony Barton	
2006	Heroes and Villains	Charlie Bolton-Rosser	
2006	Terry Pratchett's Hogfather	Mr. Gaiter	TV movie
2008	Terry Pratchett's Hogfather	Brian	
2008	In Love with Barbara	Ian McCorquodale	TV movie
2010	The King's Speech	Equerry	
2010	You Will Meet a Tall Dark Stranger	Jewellery Shop Salesman	
2011	My Week with Marilyn	Joe Orton	
2011	Mother's Milk	Jim Packer	
2011	The Iron Lady	Grey Suited Guest	
2013	Welcome to the Punch	Robert Wiseman	
2014	Mr Turner	Sir Charles Eastlake	
2014	United We Fall	Rt Hon David Anthony	
2015	Meet Pursuit Delange: The Movie	Charles Itchy Forrester	Short Film
2015	Seahorse	Stuart	Short Film
2016	The Huntsman: Winter's War	King	
2016	Kids in Love	Mr. Walker	
2017	Goodbye Christopher Robin	Headmaster	
2017	6 Days	Lt.Col. Michael Rose	
2018	Hurricane	Keith Park	
2020	The Ghost Writer	Irwin	(pre-production)
2020	Paintball Massacre	Marshal Eddie	(pre-production)
2020	The Rectory	Glanville	(pre-production)

=== Television ===
Year	Title	Role	Notes
1993	The Bill	Stephen Broom	TV series - Episode: The Price of Fame
1994	Love Hurts	Jez	TV series - Episode: The Parent Trap
1995	Julia Jekyll and Harriet Hyde	Lester Blister	TV series
1996	The Ruth Rendell Mysteries	Christopher Riding	TV series
1996	Soldier Soldier	Lt Adrian Hodges	TV series
2001	The Armando Iannucci Shows		TV series
2003	Clocking Off	Adrian Thompson	TV series
2005	Distant Shores	Nash	TV series - Episodes: #1.1 & #1.2
2005	The Thick of It	Mark Davies	TV series - Episode: #2.1
2005	Egypt	Henry Salt	TV series
2005	Rosemary & Thyme	Stuart Blackton	TV series - Episode: The Cup of Silence
2006	The Amazing Mrs Pritchard	Paul Critchley	TV series
2009	Ashes to Ashes	Nigel Pattison	TV series - Episode: #2.3
2009	Heartbeat	Giles MacLean	TV series
2009	Psychoville	Prosecutor	TV series
2014	Warren United	Michael The Horse (voice)	TV series
2016	The Rebel	Auctioneer	TV series
2016	Birds of a Feather	Rupert Julian-Jones	TV series - Episode: There's a Girl in My Souk
2017	Henry IX	Edwin, the Duke of Cumberland	TV series
2018	Endeavour	Major Coward	TV series
2018	Collateral	Major Tim Dyson	TV series
2019	Death in Paradise	Benedict Dacre	TV series - Episode: #8.4
2019	Grantchester	Eddie	TV series - Episode: #4.5
2020	Father Brown	Bertie Quinton QC	TV series - Episode: The Scales of Justice
2020	Belgravia	Lord Richmond	TV series

=== Theatre ===
Year	Title	Role	Notes
2006	Tom and Viv	Maurice	Almeida Theatre, London
2009	The 39 Steps	Richard Hannay	Criterion Theatre, London
