= Lee Latchford-Evans =

English singer, dancer and stage actor (born 1975)

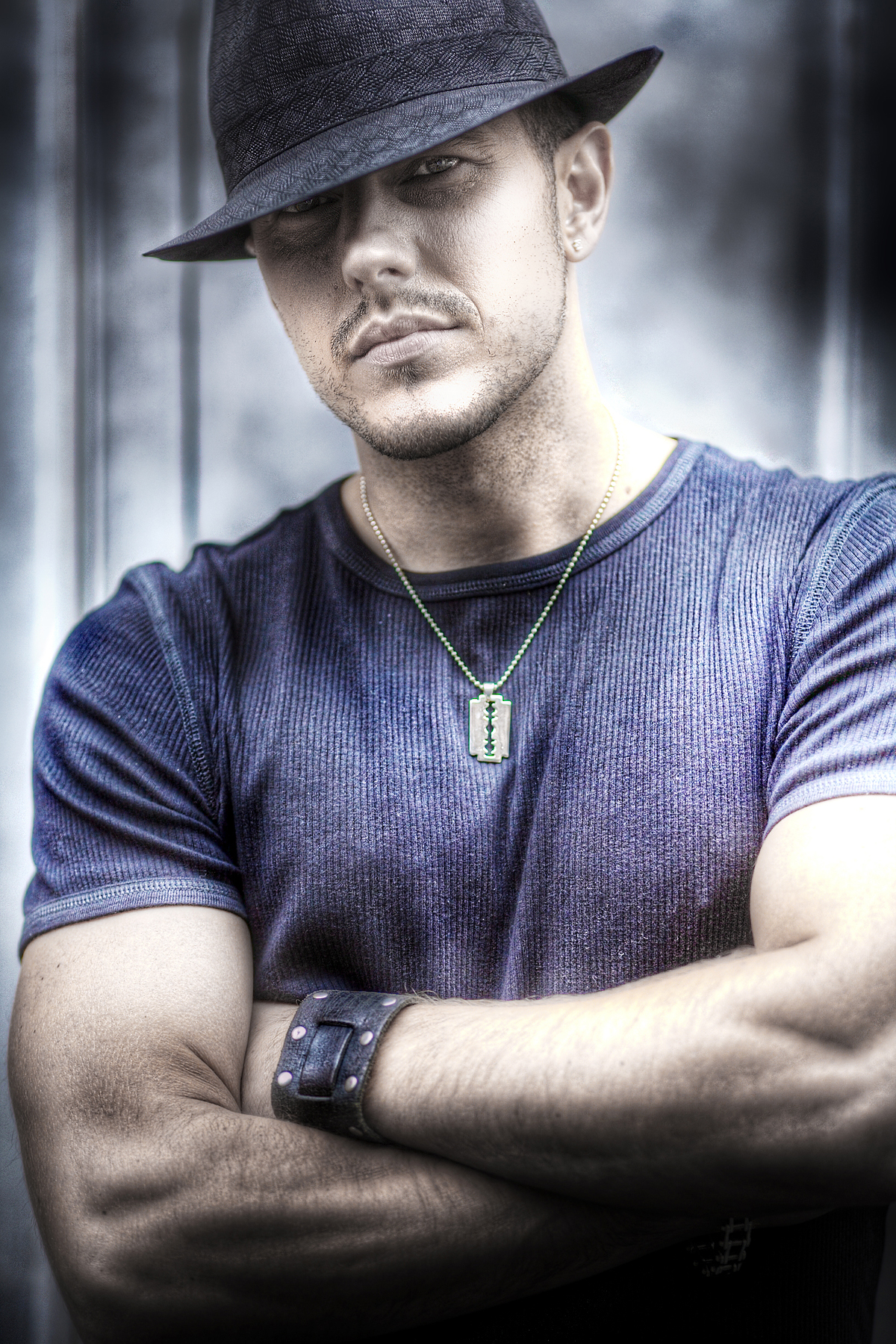
- Latchford-Evans in April 2009

Background information
- Born: Lee Latchford Evans; 28 January 1975 (age 51); Chester, Cheshire, England
- Origin: Ellesmere Port, England
- Genre: Pop
- Occupations: Singer, songwriter, dancer, stage actor, personal trainer
- Instruments: Vocals
- Years active: 1997–present
- Labels: Jive, Sony, Steps, Warner
- Member of: Steps
- Formerly of: Upper Street; the Latch
- Spouse: Kerry-Lucy Taylor (m. 2012)

Lee Latchford-Evans (born 28 January 1975) is an English singer, rapper, dancer, stage actor and one of the five singers of the British pop group Steps.

== Early life ==
Born in Chester and grew up in Ellesmere Port, Evans was born as Lee Latchford Evans, with his middle name Latchford taken from footballer Bob Latchford of Everton F.C., as his father was a lifelong fan of the club. He began using his middle name professionally to differentiate himself from well-known comedian Lee Evans. For a time he was known as Lee Latchford before adding a hyphen between his middle name and surname.

Before going into music, Evans was an aspiring footballer and had trials with several football clubs. He starred in a school production of Grease as a pupil at Sutton High School and went on to the Cheshire School of Dance and Drama, now part of West Cheshire College.

== Career ==
=== Steps ===
In 1997, Evans became a member of the pop group Steps; they went on to sell 14 consecutive Top 5 singles (a feat for a British act, at the time, bettered only by the Beatles), sold more than 20 million records worldwide. They announced their split on Boxing Day 2001. His role in the group was mostly choreographer and providing backing vocals, and he rarely sang lead on the songs. However, he did perform lead on "Turn Around" (which he co-wrote), the two verses of 5,6,7,8 and one verse on Say You'll Be Mine.

Steps reformed in May 2011 for a four-part documentary series on Sky Living titled Steps: Reunion. The series started airing on 28 September, following an announcement of a second greatest hits album, The Ultimate Collection, that was released on 10 October 2011. The album entered the charts at number one, becoming the band's third album to achieve this feat. The second series of Steps: Reunion titled "Steps: On the Road Again" aired on Sky Living in April 2012; the series followed the band as they embarked on their sellout 22-date UK tour. On 24 September 2012, the group confirmed they would release their fourth studio album Light Up The World on 12 November 2012, alongside a six-date Christmas tour, starting from 30 November and ending on 5 December. The group reformed for a second time on 1 January 2017 in celebration of their 20th anniversary, and later announced their fifth studio album Tears on the Dancefloor, which was released in April 2017 and entered the charts at number 2. On 5 March 2017, the group confirmed the release of the new album, alongside its lead single, "Scared of the Dark", and a 22-date tour, Party on the Dancefloor. A deluxe edition of the album, titled Tears on the Dancefloor: Crying at the Disco, was released on 27 October.

In November 2017, Tozer announced that the reunion was no longer just a 20th-anniversary celebration and that the group intended to continue after their 2018 Summer of Steps tour. In April 2018, Richards announced that, following the summer tour, they would begin work on their sixth studio album. In February 2019, Richards announced the group would begin recording their next album during the summer months.

On 7 September 2020, via their social media accounts, Steps announced the release date of their album entitled What the Future Holds. The album was released on 27 November of the same year, with pre-orders available from 8 September. The next day, they confirmed a new 14-date UK tour (with special guest Sophie Ellis-Bextor) starting in November 2021. The first single from the album was the Greg Kurstin-and-Sia-penned "What the Future Holds", released on 9 September 2020. It was followed by "Something in Your Eyes" on 27 October 2020. "To the Beat of My Heart" was released as the album's third single in January 2021.

The first single from What the Future Holds Pt. 2 was confirmed as a reworked version of "Heartbreak in This City" featuring Michelle Visage.

=== Theatre and television ===
Evans has appeared in London's West End starring in Grease; A Charmed Life as part of London's Sitcom Trials, and he made his debut at the Fringe Festival in Edinburgh in August 2009 in the production of Wolfboy. He played the Prince in Rotherhams Pantomime version of Snow White in 2010. Latchford-Evans has appeared in the reality television shows The Games, Fear Factor, I'm Famous and Frightened!, The Match and went on to win Commando VIP. In 2006, he appeared in a new reality show on MTV, Totally Boyband. This show was from the same creators as the show Totally Scott-Lee, which featured his ex-colleague Lisa Scott-Lee and her family. In 2008, he appeared as part of Team Ant on Ant and Dec's Saturday Night Takeaway. He also appeared on Never Mind the Buzzcocks in October 2010. Evans appeared in Ten Dead Men (2008) produced by Phil Hobden, and also appeared in Britflick Cash and Curry playing the villain, Casper Warrington-Boothe.

== Personal life ==
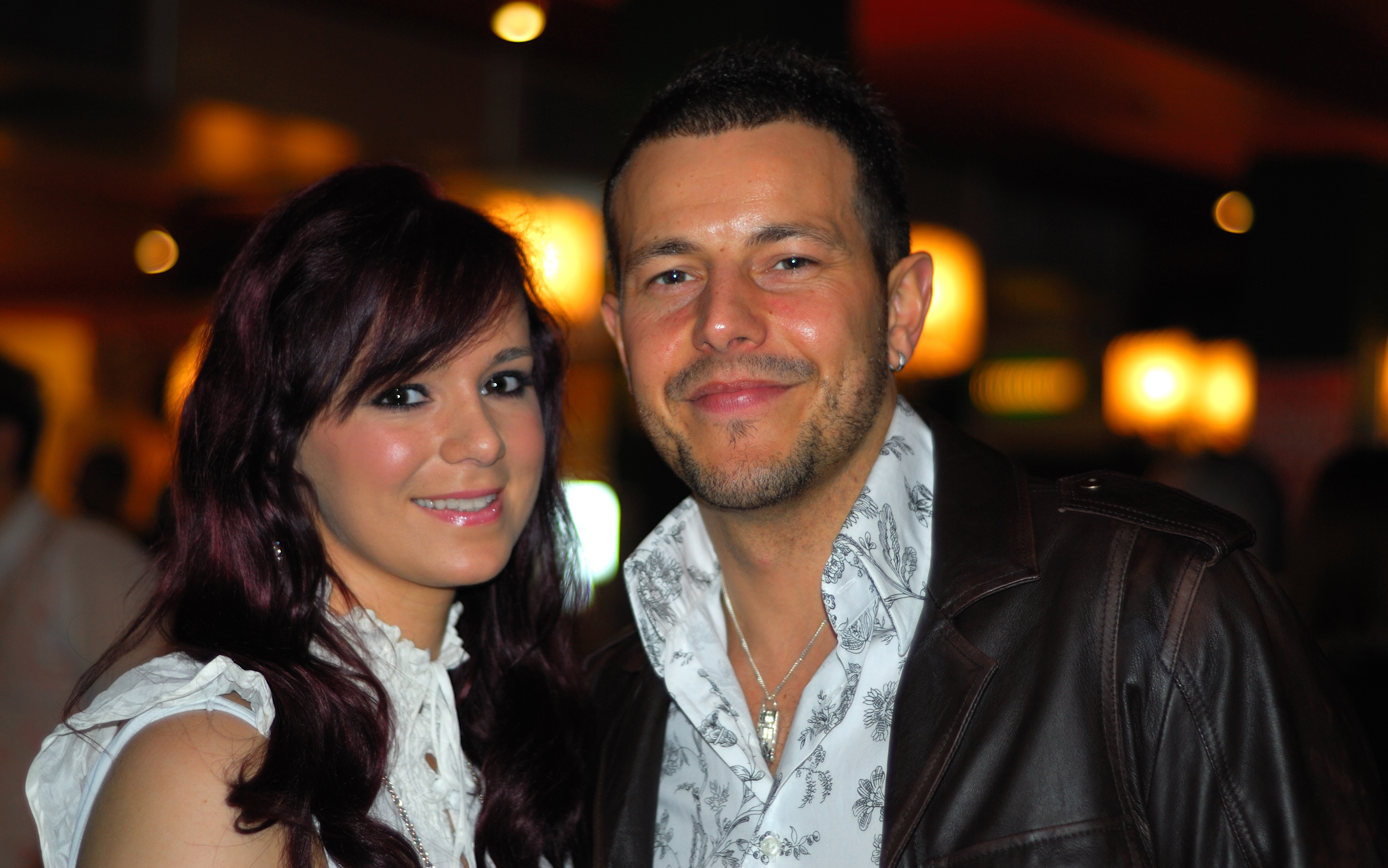
Evans with his wife Kerry-Lucy Taylor in 2008

Evans is married to Kerry-Lucy Taylor. Their son was born on 23 July 2021.

Evans is a qualified personal trainer and owner of a fitness web magazine.

In December 2025 Latchford-Evans revealed he was going to become a father for the second time.

== Selected credits ==
=== Film and television ===
Year	Title	Role	Notes
2001	Crossroads	Himself	Episode dated 5 April 2001
2003	The Games	Himself	Series 1 episode 1
2005	Commando VIP	Himself	6 episodes
2005	I'm Famous and Frightened!	Himself	1 episode
2006	Totally Boyband	Himself	4 episodes
2008	Ten Dead Men	Harris	
2008	Cash and Curry	Casper Warrington-Boothe	
2008	Reality Knocks	Kind stranger	Short film
2008	Conversations with Dead Men	Himself	Television film
2017	The Rizen	Lieutenant Conner Taylor	
2018	Dead Ringer	Jason Venom Addict	
2019	Years and Years	Himself	Episode 3
2019	Ninja Warrior UK	Himself	Series 5 episode 1
2020	Paintball Massacre	Nathan Brown	
2021	RuPaul's Drag Race UK	Himself	Series 3 episode 4
2022	The Hit List	Himself	
2024	Celebrity Mastermind	Himself	Series 22 episode 10
