= Makosi Musambasi =

Zimbabwean model

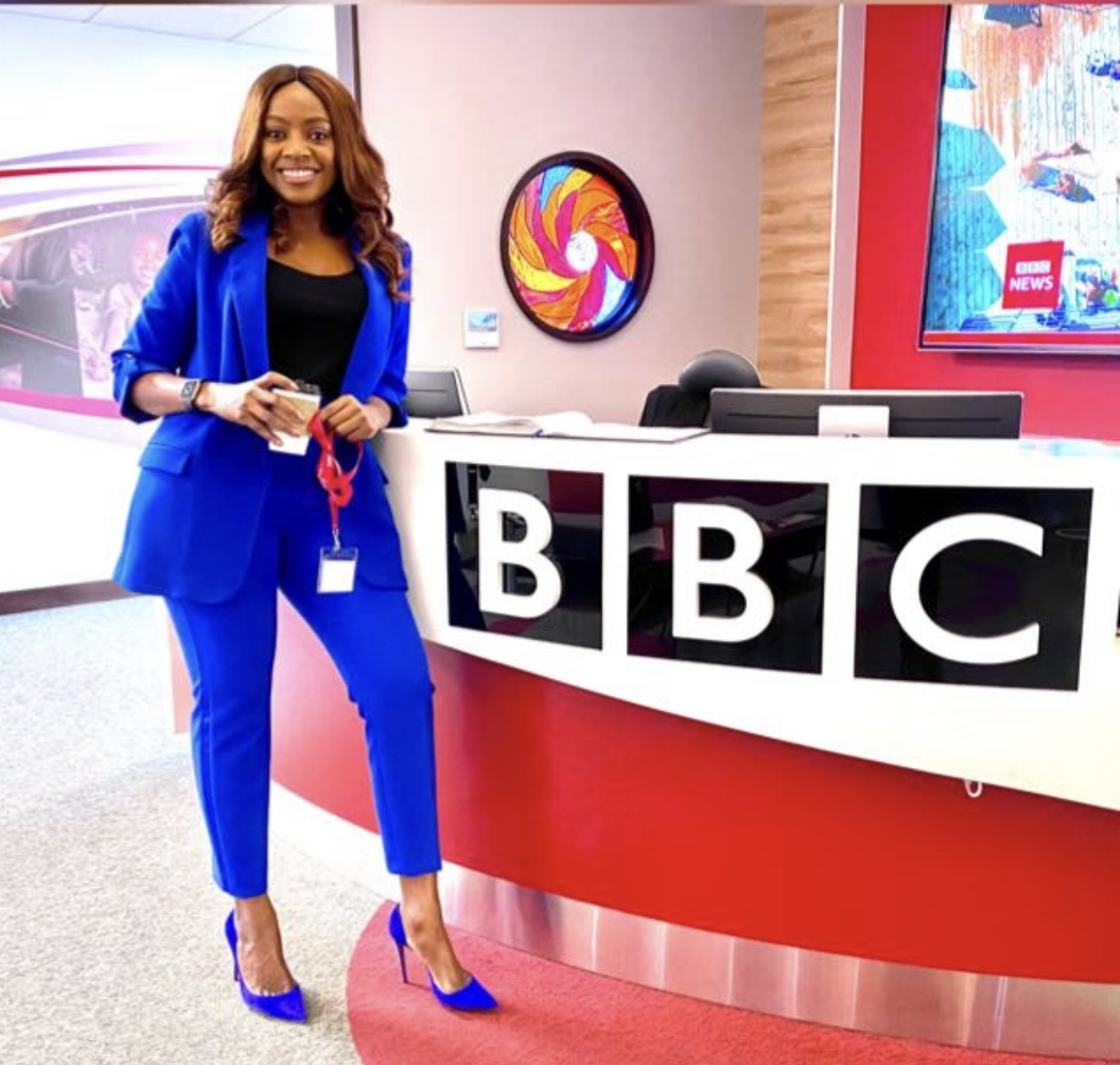
- Musambasi in 2020
- Born: September 23, 1980 (age 45); Harare, Zimbabwe
- Education: University of Luton
- Occupations: Socialite; TV Personality; Life Coach
- Years active: 2005–present
- Known for: Big Brother 6; Ultimate Big Brother; Cash and Curry; Dead Set

Makosi Musambasi (born 23 September 1980) is a Zimbabwean reality television star, television presenter and model. She is best known for her appearance on the sixth series of Big Brother UK in 2005.

== Early life ==
Musambasi was born in Harare, Zimbabwe. She moved to the United Kingdom in 1999, attaining a nursing degree at the University of Luton, and a diploma in Journalism from EMDI in Dubai.

== Big Brother ==
In 2005, Musambasi entered the sixth series of Big Brother UK on Day 1, where she placed third overall. During her time in the Big Brother house she infamously claimed she was pregnant with housemate, and eventual winner, Anthony Hutton's child, after Hutton performed digital penetration on Musambasi in the hot tub. The pregnancy incident caused a ton of media coverage and controversy. When evicted in the live final, she left the house to a negative reaction from the live crowd, and was questioned by presenter Davina McCall during her eviction interview, which resulted in multiple Ofcom complaints branding McCall a bully.

In 2005, she took part in the E4 zombie thriller Dead Set, playing herself.

In 2010, she entered the Ultimate Big Brother house, where she placed eleventh overall, being evicted on Day 11. During her time in the Ultimate Big Brother house she expressed regrets from her previous showing on the reality series.

== Television career ==
After leaving Big Brother, Musambasi began presenting various music shows for MTV and made several other television appearances including; 8 out of 10 Cats and Richard and Judy. In 2008, she featured in British independent comedy film, Cash and Curry, playing the role of Ayesha.

In 2012, she returned to Zimbabwe where she presents her own daytime talk show titled, Makosi Today, which airs weekly on ZBC TV and is also currently being broadcast in Nigeria.

== Personal life ==
In 2013, Musambasi authored a book titled; Love Yourself, The Ultimate Choice. In 2017, she announced that she'd had a mastectomy and chemotherapy after being diagnosed with breast cancer.

She is the founder of Africa Media Inc, being recognised with Media Personality of the Year, awarded by Zimbabwe International Women's Awards. She also founded Be Your Sister's Keeper Foundation, which she launched in 2014.

== Filmography ==
Film and television
Year	Title	Role	Notes
2005	Big Brother UK series 6	Self; housemate	3rd place, 90 episodes
2005	Dead Set	Makosi Musambasi	4 episodes
2006	Richard & Judy	Self; guest	1 episode
2008	Big Brother's Little Brother	Self; ex-housemate	1 episode
2008	Cash and Curry	Ayesha	
2010	Big Brother's Big Awards Show	Self; ex-housemate	TV special
2010	8 out of 10 Cats	Self; guest	1 episode
2010	Ultimate Big Brother	Self; housemate	11th place, 16 episodes
2011	Big Brother's Bit on the Side	Self; ex-housemate	1 episode
2012-	Makosi Today	Self; presenter	

== See also ==
- List of Big Brother (British TV series) housemates
