= Scott Cordon =

British field hockey player

Personal information
- Born: 11 November 1979 (age 46) England
- Height: 187 cm (6 ft 2 in)
- Weight: 100 kg (220 lb)

Sport
- Sport: Field hockey
- Position: Defender
Senior career
Years	Team	Caps	Goals
1990–1996	Leek	-	-
1996–1998	Sheffield	-	-
1998–2000	Beeston	-	-
2000–2008	Cannock	-	-
2014–2022	Didsbury Northern	-	-
2023–2024	Oxton	-	-
National team
Years	Team	Caps	Goals
–	GB & England	68	-

Robert Scott Cordon (born 11 November 1979) is a British former field hockey player, who played for Great Britain and England.

== Biography ==
Cordon played club hockey for Sheffield in the Men's England Hockey League after signing for them in 1996. He had previously spent his junior and early career with Leek Hockey Club. The following year in 1997 he was called up to the U18 England training squad. After joining Beeston in 1998 and became the England U21 captain.

Cordon joined Cannock from Beeston for the 2000/01 season. While at Cannock he represented England at the 2005 Men's EuroHockey Nations Championship and was part of the England Commonwealth Games team at the 2006 Commonwealth Games in Melbourne.

After his international retirement Cordon had won 68 caps for England and Great Britain. In 2014 he joined Didsbury Northern Hockey Club as a player coach.

In 2023 he became the Headteacher at King's Leadership Academy Liverpool
