= Katy Brand =

English actress, comedian and writer

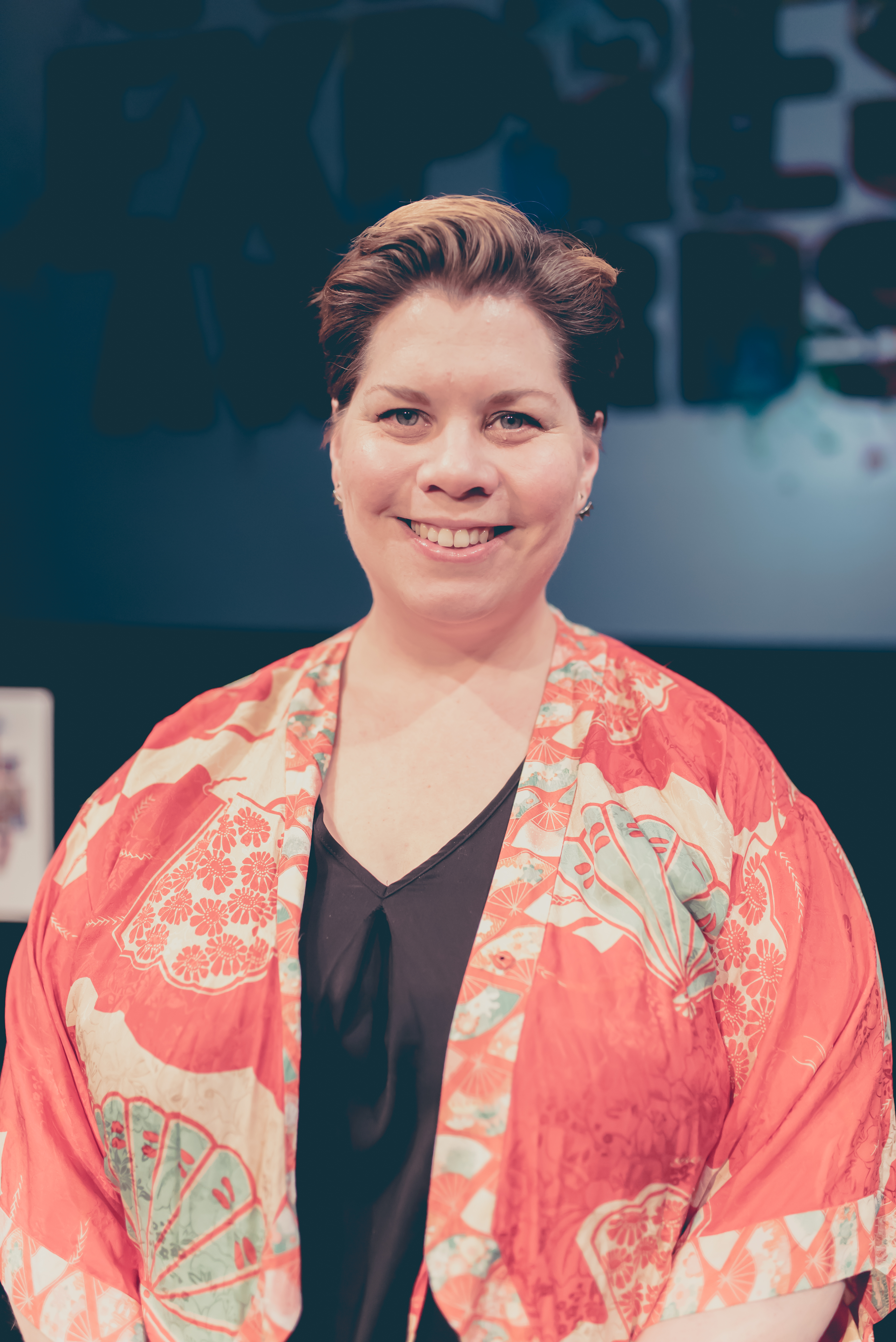
- Brand hosting the 2017 Freedom of Expression Awards
- Born: Katherine Frances Brand; 1979 (age 46–47); Buckinghamshire, England
- Education: Keble College, Oxford
- Occupations: Actress, comedian, television writer
- Years active: 2001–present
- Television: Big Ass Show; Mongrels

Katherine Frances Brand (born 13 January 1979), known as Katy Brand, is an English actress, comedian and writer, known for her ITV2 series Katy Brand's Big Ass Show and Comedy Lab Slap on Channel 4.

== Early life and education ==
Brand was born in Buckinghamshire, England, in 1979, and enjoyed making people laugh with her impressions as a young child.

Brand attended St Clement Danes School in Chorleywood, Hertfordshire. Following a summer holiday at 13 with friends who were evangelical Christians she embraced their faith and attended church five times a week.

Motivated to read theology at Keble College, Oxford, she then lost her religious beliefs while a student. Interviewed for the Evening Standard in 2007, she commented: "After about a year, I realised it was mostly rubbish and that things are never as simple as they seem when you are 13". While at Oxford, she started to write and perform comedy, musicals and serious plays, joining the Oxford Revue and the university's dramatic society. She graduated with an upper second-class honours Bachelor of Arts (BA) degree in 2000.

== Career ==
After graduation, Brand did not work as a performer, gaining employment in television production for five years instead, but her social encounters with university contemporaries ultimately convinced her to try working as a comedian. In 2004 she wrote a comedy monologue, performing it in a few pubs in London before joining Ealing Live, a weekly live spot.

Brand established her name with her solo stand-up act at the Edinburgh Fringe in 2005.

In 2008, she collaborated with Katherine Parkinson, one of her friends from university, on a BBC Radio 4 series called Mouth Trap.

Brand performed in Katy Brand's Big Ass Tour 2010. She also competed on Let's Dance for Sport Relief in 2010, in which she danced to Beyoncé's "Single Ladies (Put a Ring on It)". Also in 2010, she made a guest appearance on the song "Stop Giving Me Verses" by The Hoosiers, which was an attempt to break the world record for the longest single ever released.

In 2011, Brand took part in the BBC Learning project "Off By Heart Shakespeare", where she played the role of Titania from A Midsummer Night's Dream and delivered a performance of the speech "Out of this wood do not desire to go".

In 2011 she guest-hosted a Children in Need special episode of Never Mind the Buzzcocks, and has participated in several other episodes of the show. In December 2012 she participated in the 2012 Christmas Special of the dance show Strictly Come Dancing. Her partner was Anton du Beke; they came second to last.

Brand presented the Penguin Podcast for Penguin Books until February 2021, which included interviews with authors such as Michael Morpurgo (author of War Horse, amongst other famous young adult novels), Markus Zusak (author of The Book Thief) and Gabourey Sidibe.

She published her debut novel, Brenda Monk is Funny, in 2014, a story about a woman trying to establish a career as a comedian. Her debut play, 3Women, starring Anita Dobson opened at Trafalgar Studios 2 in May 2018 and is published by Samuel French. Her book about the film Dirty Dancing, entitled I Carried a Watermelon, was published by HarperCollins Publishers in October 2019. The following year saw her release the memoir Practically Perfect, about her love for Mary Poppins.

In March 2020, she took the role of Miss Hedge in the West End musical Everybody's Talking About Jamie.

Brand wrote the 2021 comedy feature film Good Luck to You, Leo Grande, starring Emma Thompson and directed by Sophie Hyde.

Brand won Celebrity Mastermind in an edition broadcast in May 2021.

== Awards ==
In 2008 she won "Best Female Newcomer" in the 2008 British Comedy Awards. and was also nominated for a Royal Television Society Award the same year.

For Good Luck to You, Leo Grande, Brand was nominated for two British Independent Film Awards: Best Independent Film and Best Screenplay.

== Filmography ==
Year	Project	Role	Notes
2006	Comedy Lab: Slap (TV)		Channel 4
2006	Tittybangbang (TV)	Various	BBC Three
2006	Hyperdrive (TV)	Alien 2	BBC Two
2006	Casualty (TV)	Jill Grainger	BBC One
2006	Comedy Cuts (TV)	Various	ITV2
2006	Under One Roof (TV)	Various	Writer, alongside James Bachman
2006	Touch Me, I'm Karen Taylor	Various	BBC Three
2007	Peep Show (TV)	Lucy	Channel 4
2007	Katy Brand's Big Ass Show (TV)	Various	ITV2
2007	Rob Brydon's Annually Retentive	Debbie	BBC Three
2008	Headcases (TV)	Various	ITV
2008	Placebo (TV)		BBC Three
2009	Good Arrows	Big Sheila	
2010	Nanny McPhee and the Big Bang	Miss Turvey	
2010	Let's Dance for Sport Relief (TV)	Herself	Danced to "Single Ladies" by Beyoncé
2010	Argumental (TV)	Herself	Dave
2010	The Bubble (TV)	Herself	BBC Two
2010	Mongrels (TV)	Kali (voice)	BBC Three
2010	Katy Brand vs...	Herself	ITV2
2010	Never Mind the Buzzcocks (TV)	Herself	BBC Two
2010	Ask Rhod Gilbert (TV)	Herself	BBC One
2011	Alexander Armstrong's Big Ask	Herself	Dave
2014	Walking on Sunshine	Lil	Vertigo Films
2015	Mapp & Lucia (TV)	Hermione Pillson	BBC One
2016	Hank Zipzer (TV)	Kathleen Murray	CBBC, one episode "Zipzers and Aliens"
2019	Pilgrimage: Road to Rome	Herself	BBC Two
2019	Midsomer Murders (TV)	Jemima Starling	ITV, one episode "The Miniature Murders"
2020	Paintball Massacre		
2022	Good Luck to You, Leo Grande	—N/a	Writer
2025	The Thursday Murder Club	—N/a	Writer
