= Vexed =

British television series

- Second series title card
- Genre: Comedy drama Police procedural
- Created by: Howard Overman
- Starring: Toby Stephens; Lucy Punch (Series 1); Miranda Raison (Series 2); Roger Griffiths; Ronny Jhutti; Nick Dunning; Rory Kinnear (Series 1)
- Composers: Willie Dowling; Ray Harman
- Country of origin: United Kingdom
- Original language: English
- No. of series: 2
- No. of episodes: 9

Production
- Executive producers: Jill Green; Simon Wilson (Series 1); Chris Sussman (Series 2)
- Producers: Eve Gutierrez; Carolyn Parry Jones (Series 1)
- Cinematography: Tim Palmer; Peter Robinson
- Editor: Charlie Phillips
- Running time: 55 - 60 minutes
- Production companies: Greenlit Rights Productions; Eleventh Hour Films

Original release
- Network: BBC Two; BBC HD
- Release: 15 August 2010 – 5 September 2012

Vexed is a British comedy-drama police procedural television series for BBC Two that aired in 2010 and 2012.

Created and written by Howard Overman, the first series starred Lucy Punch as D.I. Kate Bishop and Toby Stephens as D.I. Jack Armstrong, a detective duo with a fractious relationship. Jack is lazy and disorganised but charming, whereas Kate is efficient and usually exasperated by Jack's way of doing things. The show also starred Rory Kinnear, who plays Kate's husband Dan, with whom she is going through marriage counselling. Other recurring characters are Naz, an eccentric crime scene specialist, and Tony, owner of the bar at which the characters relax. The drama is set in contemporary London.

== Next series ==
In the second series (first announced on 18 January 2012) Punch and Kinnear did not return. Lucy's character was replaced by Miranda Raison playing D.I. Georgina Dixon, with Nick Dunning playing her father, a retired policeman with a dubious security business. The portrayal of Jack in the second series has him being a bit more competent and less comedically over-the-top than in the first series, but still having sufficient character traits to consistently annoy his new partner. She has her own personality issues, which Jack is quick to point out.

== Cast ==
- Toby Stephens as DI Jack Armstrong
- Lucy Punch as DI Kate Bishop (series 1)
- Rory Kinnear as Dan Bishop, Kate's husband (series 1)
- Ronny Jhutti as Naz Omar
- Roger Griffiths as Tony
- Miranda Raison as DI Georgina Dixon (series 2)
- Nick Dunning as Peter Dixon, Georgina's father (series 2)
- Patrick Baladi as Mark Armstrong, Jack's brother (series 2)
- Ashley Artus as Tim (series 1: episode 2)

== Production ==
The series was filmed in South West London, in particular Kingston upon Thames, Richmond on Thames, and Twickenham. Some of the second series filmed in Ireland.

Series 1, Episode 2 (TX 22-8-2010) was extensively filmed in the grounds and interior of Stoke Court (Stoke Poges). This had earlier served as Bayer Group UK's conference centre and laboratories.

The first series was produced by Greenlit Rights Productions and the second is produced by Eleventh Hour Films.

During the UK transmission of the programme in July 2010, it was reported that Greenlit had entered administration.

The theme tune for the series one was composed by Willie Dowling, former keyboardist with rock group The Wildhearts.

== DVD releases ==
Series One was released by Acorn Media UK on 20 August 2012. Series Two was released exclusively by Acorn Media UK on their website in December 2012 and was released elsewhere on 4 March 2013. Series One and Two boxset was released by Acorn Media UK on 8 July 2013.

== Critical reception ==
The first series received a mixed response from critics.

The Liverpool Echo's Paddy Shennan called it "deliciously black" and added that it could become a "cop classic". He also praised Stephens's performance, likening it to Leslie Nielsen's in The Naked Gun.

The Guardian's Sam Wollaston also liked it, saying "It's cheeky, irreverent, puerile, sometimes inappropriate. It also made me laugh, almost out loud a few times, and that's no bad thing in a comedy" and again praised Stephens's "fabulous" acting, while Punch's performance was "excellent".

He asserted:

"Toby Stephens is fabulous as übertwerp Jack. He has a nice, pleased-as-punch-with-himself complacency, changing his voice and raising an eyebrow when he talks to ladies. There's a hint of self-doubt there, but not enough to stop him being a total cock. And Lucy Punch as Kate is excellent at being appalled by him, but also just a tiny bit impressed, even attracted to him. Together they're wonderfully awful."

Most others disagreed with this. The Metro called it "rubbish" and said Stephens's acting was "over the top" The Daily Telegraph's Patrick Smith lamented its "[t]huddingly lame humour", Rachel Cooke of the New Statesman called it "atrocious". "Truly abysmal" said Kevin Myers of the Irish Independent while Sean Myers blamed "a sub-standard script totally lacking in style and imagination". and Damien Love of The Herald (Glasgow) said it was "[b]ad beyond belief... one of the worst things I have ever seen on television.", and likened Toby Stephen's performance to "Hugh Grant doing an impression of Ross Kemp, doing an impression of Hugh Grant doing an impression of Bodie from The Professionals", although he believed there was a chance that Lucy Punch was "wasted" in the show.

== Episodes ==
=== Series One (2010) ===
No. overall	No. in series	Title	Directed by	Written by	Original release date	UK viewers (millions)
1	1	"Episode One"	Matt Lipsey	Howard Overman	15 August 2010	2.56
When three single women are murdered and the only link is their Loyalty program purchases, Kate is set up as a potential victim to flush out the killer. The use of Loyalty program records proves both good and bad for Jack and Kate's love lives, career paths, and their mutual relationship.
2	2	"Episode Two"	Matt Lipsey	Howard Overman	22 August 2010	2.09
Jack and Kate find themselves entering the world of therapy when a depressed banker with many enemies and being treated at a private rehabilitation clinic is targeted by a hit-man and their investigations lead them to look for the killer amongst the other patients.
3	3	"Episode Three"	Matt Lipsey	Howard Overman	29 August 2010	1.90
The high profile kidnapping of a girl band member, Gemma G, puts an uncomfortable spotlight on Jack and Kate when the ransom drop goes wrong and suspicion falls on the band's publicity-seeking manager Richard Anderson.

=== Series Two (2012) ===
No. overall	No. in series	Title	Directed by	Written by	Original release date	UK viewers (millions)
4	1	"Episode One"	Ian Fitzgibbon	Chris Bucknall	1 August 2012	1.77
DI Jack Armstrong and his new partner, bright fast-tracker DI Georgina Dixon, come together at a car showroom where top salesman Karl Mercer is found dead in the boot of a car. The suspects are all employees of the car dealership, from sales staff to mechanics. Georgina is exasperated by what she thinks is Jack's casual attitude; he is annoyed by her determination to solve their first case together.
5	2	"Episode Two"	Ian Fitzgibbon	James Wood	8 August 2012	1.31
The mismatched detectives investigate the murder in a university library of student Laura Edwards who is studying gender studies. Jack goes undercover as a mature student to aid their investigation of the tutors, students, and the complicated world of gender politics. In their private lives, Georgina meets her perfect man and Jack obsesses over his girlfriend, Danielle, to the amusement of Georgina with his descriptions of their relationship.
6	3	"Episode Three"	Ian Fitzgibbon	Chris Bucknall	15 August 2012	1.10
Demoted to "missing persons" for a week after Jack defaced the Chief Constable's poster, Jack and Georgina investigate missing solicitor Ted Finch. When his body turns up in the river, the detectives have to determine if it is suicide, murder, or an accident by checking into his life at home, work, and the last place he was sighted, the gym. Georgina's father unexpectedly appears as a crime prevention consultant.
7	4	"Episode Four"	Kieron J Walsh	Jack Williams & Harry Williams	22 August 2012	0.89
When Alison Clarke (the frontrunner contestant on a cookery show) is murdered, Georgina goes undercover to solve the murder, trying to stay plenty distant from suspects including the other contestants, show host Robert Randall, and show assistant Sue Goretti. Georgina takes the contest seriously and Jack takes advantage of her cooking skills to enhance his love life.
8	5	"Episode Five"	Kieron J Walsh	Steve Coombes	29 August 2012	0.91
When the headmaster of a hugely popular local primary school is murdered by a knitting needle in the neck, Jack and Georgine quickly arrest one of the last five mothers to see him that morning. Realising they may have made a mistake, further investigation reveals the headmaster was taking bribes from the mothers wanting their children accepted by his school. The school secretary is poisoned and Jack - mesmerised by one of the mothers - does not realise he too has been poisoned. Georgina's father announces he is divorcing her mother.
9	6	"Episode Six"	Kieron J Walsh	James Wood	5 September 2012	0.79
The unconventional detectives investigate a robbery from the safe of a family-run jewellery store of a diamond belonging to a famous footballer. The thieves knew the combination, likely making it an inside job, so all the family and staff are suspects. Jack is distracted by an invitation to be best man at his brother's wedding, an invitation with a sting in the tail from a brother he despises. Georgina has problems when she experiments with online dating and is overwhelmed by the response.

Series two of Vexed was broadcast Wednesdays at 9pm at the same time as the London Olympic games. Episode five was broadcast at the same time as the opening ceremony of the London Paralympics games.

Both Series One and Two are available on Netflix in Canada, the U.K. & U.S.
