= Derek Laud =

British political lobbyist (born 1964)

Derek Laud FRSA
- Born: Derek George Henry Laud; 9 August 1964; Chelsea, London, England
- Citizenship: United Kingdom
- Education: University of Oxford
- Occupations: Banker, Businessman, Private Equity and former speechwriter
- Employer: Stanhope Capital
- Known for: Big Brother
- Website: www.dereklaud.org.uk

Derek George Henry Laud FRSA (born 9 August 1964) is a British banker, author, broadcaster and visiting professor. He has other wide business interests.

Laud is a Fellow of the Royal Society of Arts. He is a visiting research fellow at Oxford University and pro chancellor at London South Bank University and visiting professor in the Faculty of Law and Social Sciences.

Laud is a partner in the private banking sector and also senior adviser at Stern & Co, a Rothschild and Goldsmith Private Family Office. He currently sits on the board of the Overseas Territories, chaired by Lord Northbrook, and is executive director. Laud has been a political adviser and professional speechwriter.

Laud is co-founder and executive director of the New City Initiative, a think tank for the finance sector. He is also a partner, partnership secretary, director of the advisory board, and director of global corporate affairs at wealth management company Stanhope Capital LLP. Laud was the first black member of the Conservative Monday Club and was the first black master of foxhounds in the United Kingdom. He was also a contestant on the 2005 series of the British reality television show Big Brother.

== Early life ==
Derek Laud was born on 9 August 1964 in Chelsea, London. He was educated at Oxford University and played tennis at the annual Oxford v Cambridge annual tournament. He holds various degrees, including in History and later studied and conducted research in the Divinity Faculty at Cambridge University.

== Career ==
=== Politics ===
Laud was the first special adviser appointed to the House of Lords Rural Economy Group, where members included the Duke of Westminster (for whom he wrote speeches).

Laud was briefly a member of the Conservative Monday Club. In October 1984, he produced a policy paper under the auspices of the club's Immigration and Race Relations Committee titled "The Law, Order and Race Relations". He considered himself on the liberal wing of the club, and resigned following disagreements about apartheid South Africa. He later wrote a paper on how to apply cultural sanctions on the regime and was a vocal critic of the British government and its apparent lack of interest in dismantling apartheid.

Laud subsequently became a researcher and special adviser, working for Conservative Members of Parliament and government ministers in the mid to late 1980s. He also worked as an advisor to Sir Gordon Downey, the former auditor general, parliamentary commissioner for standards, and chairman of the Personal Investment Authority. He was private secretary to Lord Rees, chief secretary to the treasury and minister for trade. He also acted as a researcher for Sir Spencer Perceval, the solicitor-general.

In the second half of the 1980s, he became an aide and speechwriter for then prime minister Margaret Thatcher. During this period, Laud also contributed to speeches for other leading Conservative politicians, including Alan Clark and Michael Heseltine. Laud was a campaign aide for then Prime Minister John Major in 1990 and the 1992 general election campaign.

In the 1997 general election, Laud was selected as Conservative parliamentary candidate for Tottenham, a constituency with a large non-white population that had been represented by black Labour MPs since 1987, but stepped down shortly before the election, citing "business reasons". The Daily Telegraph reported that Laud had withdrawn his candidacy after being convicted of drink driving in the United States. Three people in a car struck by Laud suffered minor physical injuries.

In May 2019 Laud stood for the Liberal Democrats in Witney for election to West Oxfordshire District Council, as a protest against the Windrush scandal. He was a strong critic of prime minister Theresa May, writing in the Financial Times that she was 'characterless, incompetent and even her best would never be good enough'.

=== Business ===
In the late 1980s Laud was a consultant for Strategy Network International (SNI), a lobbying company with clients in the mining and minerals sector in Southern Africa. The firm had links to UNITA, the Angolan armed opposition group. He headed the financial regulatory arm of the business. He recommended the recruitment of business partner and Conservative MP Michael Colvin as an adviser. Laud sat on the advisory board of Sadlers Wells, chaired by Ian Hay Davison, the CEO of Lloyd's of London.

During the late 1990s, Laud was headhunted into private equity by Sir John Beckwith, and was a director of companies owned and controlled by the Pacific Group. The group had substantial investments in wealth management, through River and Mercantile, and Thames River Capital. Other investments included healthcare, education (Laud chaired the board of the Ravenstone House Group of Schools) gyms, sport and outdoor media, and owners of a model agency.

In 1992, Laud co-founded the lobbying company Ludgate Laud with Michael Colvin. In 1996 Laud acquired part of Ludgate Laud, then with an annual fee income of around £500,000 and with clients such as Johnson and Johnson, British Steel and the Institute of Actuaries, the Personal Investment Authority and Takecare PLC.

He is a partner, partnership secretary, director of the advisory board, and director of corporate affairs at wealth management company Stanhope Capital LLP.

Laud is also co-founder and the executive director of New City Initiative, a think tank concerned with the independent banking sector. He is a banker in the wealth management sector and holds various other directorships.

He was the chairman of the Foundation Board of Lucy Cavendish College at the University of Cambridge, and the North American Committee from 2020-2023.

=== Writing ===
In 2015 Laud published The Problem With Immigrants through political publishing house Biteback, and he is a contributing writer to the Financial Times, The Independent, and The Daily Maverick. He has been a regular writer at the Wimbledon Championships since 2010.

== Media appearances ==
=== Big Brother ===
In 2005, Laud was a contestant on the sixth series of the British reality television series Big Brother, in which a number of contestants live in an isolated house trying to avoid being evicted by the public. He was the tenth person to be evicted from the Big Brother House after losing in a head-to-head with Eugene Sully.

=== Other ===
Laud appeared on a charity edition of the television quiz show Who Wants to Be a Millionaire? on 17 September 2005, partnering Edwina Currie. Laud appeared on the BBC television discussion programme Question Time in November 2005. He is selective about the TV shows he takes part in, describing most of them as a 'degrading shouting matches with little or no intellectual credibility'.

== Personal life ==
An enthusiastic fox hunter, Laud was made Master of Foxhounds for the New Forest Hunt in 1999, becoming the first black master of foxhounds in the United Kingdom. He lives between the Cotswolds and Knightsbridge in London.

Laud is an advocate for the gambling addiction charity GamCare and the dog protection charity the Dogs Trust, the latter of which was his chosen charity when he appeared on Who Wants to Be a Millionaire? with former government minister Edwina Currie.
