= Moving Story =

- Genre: Comedy drama
- Created by: Jack Rosenthal
- Directed by: Roger Bamford
- Starring: Warren Clarke; Phil Davis; Con O'Neill; Ronny Jhutti
- Composer: Roger Jackson
- Country of origin: United Kingdom
- Original language: English
- No. of series: 2
- No. of episodes: 13

Production
- Executive producer: Nick Barton
- Producer: Linda Agran
- Production locations: London, England, UK
- Running time: 50 minutes
- Production companies: ABTV; Carlton Television

Original release
- Network: ITV
- Release: 26 May 1994 – 29 August 1995

Moving Story is a British comedy drama television series which aired on ITV in two series between 26 May 1994 and 29 August 1995. It was created by Jack Rosenthal as a spin-off from his 1984 film The Chain, about a group of removal men.

Actors who appeared in episodes of the series include Peter Blythe, Zena Walker, Dora Bryan, Caroline Catz, Martin Clunes, Gwen Taylor, Ben Walden, Bryan Pringle, Miles Anderson, Jeffry Wickham, Pauline Jameson, Benjamin Whitrow, Sarah-Jane Potts, Doreen Keogh, Pauline Delaney, Mark Benton, Vincent Regan, David Ryall, Shay Gorman, Jonathan Coy, Beth Goddard and Camille Coduri.

== Plot ==
The series follows the story of a group of removal men who work for a fictional company called Elite Removals.

The removal men, led by their boss, Bamber, are a tight-knit group who navigate the challenges and complexities of their job, which involves moving people's belongings from one place to another. Each episode features a different client with a unique and often emotional story, ranging from families moving to new homes to elderly individuals downsizing to retirement communities.

As the series progresses, the removal men confront their own personal struggles and challenges, including health issues, relationship problems, and financial difficulties. They support each other through these challenges, forming a strong bond and a sense of camaraderie.

Throughout the series, "Moving Story" explores themes of friendship, family, and the meaning of home. The series also offers a unique perspective on the working class, showcasing the hard work and dedication of those in blue-collar jobs.

== Main cast ==
- Warren Clarke as Bamber
- Phil Davis as Adrenalin
- Con O'Neill as Nick
- Ronny Jhutti as Asif
- Kenneth Colley as Ken Uttley
- Sheila Kelley as Patsy
- Melanie Kilburn as Charlotte
- Emma Amos as Kathy
- Meera Devon as Kalsoom

== Episodes ==
=== Series One ===
1. "Moving Story" (26 May 1994 – 75 minutes)
2. "Last Stand at Laurel Way" (2 June 1994 – brought forward from 9 June 1994)
3. "A Piece of Cake" (9 June 1994 – postponed from 2 June 1994)
4. "Father's Day" (16 June 1994)
5. "Charlotte, Emma, Bamber & Anne" (30 June 1994)
6. "None Shall Sleep" (7 July 1994)

=== Series Two ===
1. "The African Queen" (18 July 1995)
2. "Norman Blood" (25 July 1995)
3. "Bear Necessities" (1 August 1995)
4. "Something Blue" (8 August 1995)
5. "Trivial Pursuits" (15 August 1995)
6. "Superstition" (22 August 1995)
7. "Canterbury Tales" (29 August 1995)

== Bibliography ==
- Howard Maxford. Hammer Complete: The Films, the Personnel, the Company. McFarland, 2018.
