= Dead Set =

British zombie horror miniseries

- Genre: Horror; Comedy drama; Satire
- Created by: Charlie Brooker
- Written by: Charlie Brooker
- Directed by: Yann Demange
- Starring: Jaime Winstone; Andy Nyman; Riz Ahmed; Chizzy Akudolu; Liz May Brice; Warren Brown; Shelley Conn; Beth Cordingly; Adam Deacon; Kevin Eldon; Raj Ghatak; Kathleen McDermott; Davina McCall
- Composer: Dan Jones
- Country of origin: United Kingdom
- Original language: English
- No. of series: 1
- No. of episodes: 5

Production
- Executive producers: Charlie Brooker; Annabel Jones
- Producers: Angie Daniell; Chrissy Skinns
- Cinematography: Tat Radcliffe
- Editor: Chris Wyatt
- Camera setup: Single-camera
- Running time: 23–46 minutes
- Production company: Zeppotron

Original release
- Network: E4
- Release: 27 October – 31 October 2008

Related
- Reality Z

Dead Set is a British satirical zombie horror comedy-drama television miniseries created and written by Charlie Brooker and directed by Yann Demange. Set on the production compound of a fictional series of Big Brother, the story follows a zombie outbreak that erupts during a live eviction, leaving housemates and production staff trapped inside the Big Brother house as the outside world collapses.

The series stars Jaime Winstone as production runner Kelly, alongside Andy Nyman, Riz Ahmed, Warren Brown, Beth Cordingly, Raj Ghatak, Chizzy Akudolu, Kathleen McDermott and Adam Deacon. Big Brother presenter Davina McCall appears as herself, with cameo appearances from several former Big Brother housemates.

Produced by Zeppotron (then part of Endemol), Dead Set was filmed primarily during summer 2008 at Longcross Studios and at the real Big Brother house in Elstree. It premiered on E4 from 27 to 31 October 2008 as a five-episode run, and was later repeated on Channel 4 in January 2009.

The miniseries received generally positive reviews from critics for its blend of graphic horror and social satire. It was nominated for the Drama Serial award at the British Academy Television Awards in 2009. At the British Academy Television Craft Awards the same year, it won the Interactive Creative Contribution award and received a further nomination for Brooker. The series has been retrospectively cited as having thematic similarities to Brooker's later anthology series Black Mirror. A Brazilian adaptation of Dead Set titled Reality Z premiered on Netflix in 2020.

== Plot ==
On eviction night of Big Brother, reports of violent disorder across the UK raise the possibility that the live show will be cancelled. Inside the house, contestants Marky, Veronica, Grayson, Joplin, Angel, Space and Pippa remain oblivious. Producer Patrick bullies and berates his staff as presenter Davina McCall prepares for the broadcast. Production runner Kelly is having an affair with a co-worker, while her boyfriend Riq is stranded at a railway station after his van is stolen.

Elsewhere, a driver is bitten by a zombie and reaches the production compound just as he dies and reanimates, attacking a security guard. As Pippa is evicted, the infected guard stumbles into the crowd, dies and turns; the infection rapidly spreads through the compound. Zombies overrun the studio, killing the audience, crew and Davina. Kelly survives by barricading herself in an office, while Patrick saves himself by sacrificing others and takes refuge in a green room with the newly evicted Pippa, as zombie Davina prowls nearby.

By morning, the housemates remain cut off and confused by Big Brother's silence, with only Space sensing something is wrong. Kelly tries to escape in a van but is forced back inside; chased through the camera runs by a zombie cameraman, she enters the house via a Diary Room side door. The housemates assume she is a new contestant until she warns them about the outbreak and the danger behind the one-way mirrors. When Marky opens a fire exit to taunt her, the cameraman bursts in, bites Angel, and is killed by Kelly with a fire extinguisher.

Riq survives by hiding in a petrol station until he is rescued by a hardened survivor, Alex. After their vehicle breaks down and zombies give chase, they take shelter in a country house. In the Big Brother house, nurse Grayson lacks supplies to treat Angel's bite, so the group confines her to the greenhouse. Kelly, Marky and Space raid a nearby supermarket in the van. Police responding to looting shoot a bitten officer, then mistake Marky's arm injury for a bite; Kelly takes the dead officer's gun, shoots the surviving policeman in the leg, and leaves him as zombies descend. Back at the house, Angel turns; Grayson is mortally wounded and reanimates, and Joplin and Veronica kill him. Kelly returns and puts Angel down.

Riq later discovers the Big Brother live feed is still broadcasting on E4 and sees Kelly on screen. Believing the Big Brother house offers his best chance of safety, he and Alex travel by river; at a lock, Alex is bitten and forces Riq to kill her before she turns, and he continues alone.

Patrick and Pippa kill zombie Davina and reach the control room, where Patrick uses the PA system to contact the housemates and guide them into the house. He insists on attempting to reach the coast, but Kelly shows him the horde massed at the compound gates. Patrick proposes using Grayson's remains as bait to reach the van, dividing the group. When Riq arrives, Marky—armed with an assault rifle—nearly shoots him until Kelly recognises him. Riq warns that Patrick's plan is futile; the housemates restrain Patrick, but he exploits Diary Room secrets and public perception to manipulate Joplin, takes Kelly hostage, and forces the group outside with the bait. The bait is dropped during a struggle, Patrick fatally shoots Riq, and Joplin opens the gates in desperation, allowing the undead to flood the compound. Joplin is devoured and Patrick is torn apart as the survivors scramble back toward the house.

Space retreats to the control room and coordinates defence over the PA, but is bitten while unlocking the Diary Room as the house is overrun. Kelly reaches the Diary Room as Marky and Veronica are killed, and Space sees Pippa among the undead. Kelly urges Space to open the exterior door so she can fight her way to the van; he reluctantly complies. The next morning, the surviving characters have reanimated, and the Big Brother live feed broadcasts zombie Kelly's vacant stare across televisions in the UK.

== Cast ==
- Jaime Winstone as Kelly Povell, a runner on the Big Brother set
- Riz Ahmed as Riq Rahman, Kelly's boyfriend
- Adam Deacon as Space, a housemate in Big Brother
- Andy Nyman as Patrick Goad, the producer of Big Brother
- Warren Brown as Marky, a housemate in Big Brother
- Beth Cordingly as Veronica, a housemate in Big Brother
- Kathleen McDermott as Pippa, a housemate in Big Brother
- Kevin Eldon as Joplin, a housemate in Big Brother
- Raj Ghatak as Grayson, a housemate in Big Brother
- Chizzy Akudolu as Angel, a housemate in Big Brother
- Liz May Brice as Alex Bryson
- Elyes Gabel as Danny
- Shelley Conn as Claire Oberon
- Kelly Wenham as Chloe
- Jennifer Aries as Sophie
- Davina McCall as herself
- Charlie Brooker as a zombie
- Krishnan Guru-Murthy as himself
- Marcus Bentley as himself

=== Cameos by former Big Brother housemates ===
Housemate	Big Brother series
Helen Adams	Big Brother 2
Paul "Bubble" Ferguson	Big Brother 2
Eugene Sully	Big Brother 6
Kinga Karolczak	Big Brother 6
Makosi Musambasi	Big Brother 6
Saskia Howard-Clarke	Big Brother 6
Aisleyne Horgan-Wallace	Big Brother 7
Imogen Thomas	Big Brother 7
Brian Belo	Big Brother 8
Ziggy Lichman	Big Brother 8

== Episodes ==
All episodes were directed by Yann Demange and written by Charlie Brooker.

No.	Title	Running time (BFI master)	Original release date	UK viewers
1	"Outbreak"	45:43	27 October 2008	1,465,000; 317,000 (+1)
2	"Can the Housemates Keep Angel Alive?"	23:40	28 October 2008	1,038,000; 336,000 (+1)
3	"Live Feed"	24:17	29 October 2008	842,000; 360,000 (+1)
4	"Running"	24:12	30 October 2008	907,000; 299,000 (+1)
5	"A Way Out"	25:35	31 October 2008	705,000

== Production ==
=== Writing ===
Charlie Brooker said that the basic idea for the series came about in 2004, when he was watching the American series 24. He commented: "I'm enjoying this, but these terrorists are just ridiculous. They're like waves of Space Invaders. They might as well be zombies." He then imagined an apocalypse occurring during the filming of Big Brother, and cited the Big Brother house as a good place to hide during a zombie outbreak.

Brooker wrote the first draft of the script in 2005, during the airing of Big Brother 6. He said he based some of the fictional housemates on former Big Brother contestants; he cited Maxwell Ward and Saskia Howard-Clarke as inspirations for Marky and Veronica, and described Pippa and Space as being loosely based on Helen Adams and Kieron "Science" Harvey, respectively. For further inspiration, he attended the live eviction of George Galloway during Celebrity Big Brother 4 and visited the camera runs surrounding the house.

Beyond Big Brother, Brooker cited zombie fiction as an influence, including the Dead series of films by George A. Romero, Zombie Flesh Eaters, 28 Days Later, The Walking Dead, The Living Dead At Manchester Morgue and Zombie Creeping Flesh.

Angela Jain, then head of E4, announced that she had commissioned the series in April 2008, although the setting and premise were not publicly revealed until August of that year.

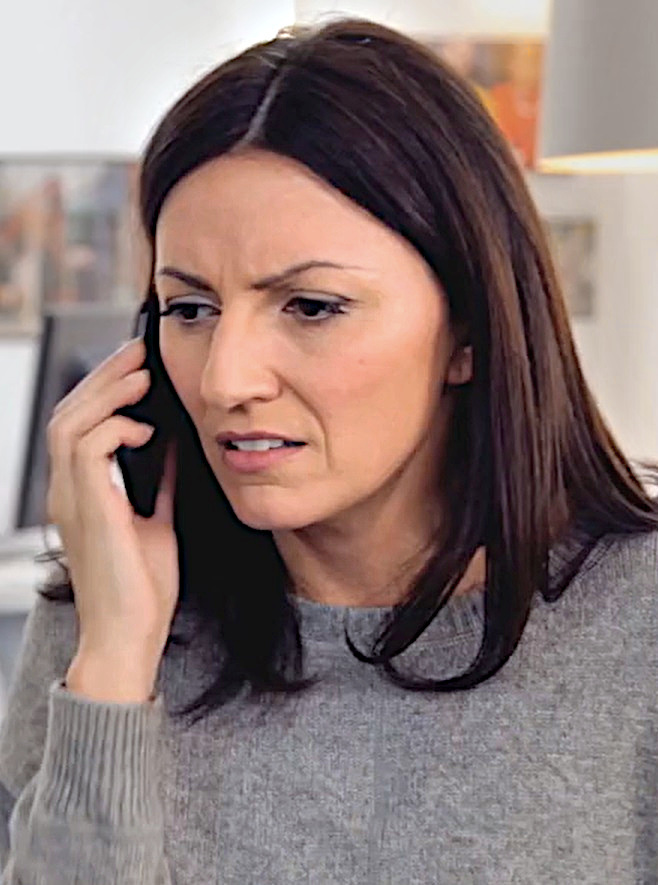
Davina McCall portrayed herself in Dead Set

=== Filming ===
Brooker described the Big Brother eye logo featured in Dead Set as a combination of several of the logos used across the franchise. The production designed the fictional Big Brother set to resemble the television programme, including similar cameras, two-way mirrors that could be angled to conceal the camera crew, astroturf and a modified Diary Room chair from Big Brother 8. Scenes set inside the house for the first episode were shot using Digital Betacam to match the look of Big Brother, while other scenes were filmed using an Arriflex D-20.

Filming took place during the summer of 2008, primarily at Longcross Studios and in surrounding areas. The eviction of Pippa (Kathleen McDermott) was filmed at the Big Brother house in Elstree on 18 July 2008, the same night that Belinda Harris-Reid was evicted from Big Brother 9. McDermott was positioned in the stairwell and "evicted" in front of the live audience, and she and Big Brother presenter Davina McCall filmed an improvised "eviction interview" in advance. Several former Big Brother housemates also appeared as themselves; they were filmed speaking together as part of a fictional reunion before the production recorded their reactions to the outbreak.

Scenes featuring McCall as a zombie were filmed in one day, and the bodies in the corridor sequence were created using special-effects dummies (except Eugene Sully's, which McCall is shown eating). McCall said she was bruised the next day from repeatedly hammering on a door during filming, and she based her running style on the T-1000 from Terminator 2: Judgment Day (1991). Because she was available for only one day, a dummy of McCall was used in some shots.

Brooker said filming was affected by budgetary and time constraints. Extras were sometimes redressed to play multiple zombies because of the cost of contact lenses used for the zombies' eyes, and a scene in episode 2 in which Alex and Riq's car breaks down was originally planned as an explosive crash. He also said constraints led him to drop an original concept for the final episode, which would have been set six months after the outbreak. Many of the zombies in crowd scenes, including the final assault on the house, were volunteers recruited online.

Brooker has a brief cameo as a zombie in the second episode.

== Release ==
=== Promotion ===
A map for the Borehamwood region, the site of the real Big Brother House, was added to the browser-based game Urban Dead as part of the series' promotion, with a competition to win a copy of the DVD.

In an interview about the campaign's interactive work, created by Will Clark, Chris Hassell and Stuart Holton, they said the promotion targeted online fan communities by combining Big Brother imagery with zombie-horror, including an interactive Diary Room clip in which a blood-covered contestant appears to write the viewer's entered name on the wall, and described the concept as "almost a magic cocktail". The interactive campaign later won a British Academy Television Craft Award for Interactive Creative Contribution.

=== Broadcast ===
Dead Set aired on E4 from 27 to 31 October 2008 (a 70-minute premiere followed by four 35-minute episodes, including adverts). The series was later repeated on Channel 4 from 6 January 2009.

In March 2009, trade publication Broadcast reported that Dead Set had been sold to broadcasters in Spain, Australia and Sweden, and to BBC Entertainment in Africa. In the United States, the miniseries aired on IFC in October 2010.

=== Home media ===
The series was released on DVD by Channel 4 DVD; the British Board of Film Classification lists an approximate running time of 142 minutes.

The DVD release includes interviews with Brooker and director Yann Demange, production featurettes, and deleted and extended scenes.

== Reception ==
=== Critical response ===
On the review aggregator website Rotten Tomatoes, 92% of 12 critics' reviews are positive. The website's consensus reads: "A bloody take on Big Brother, Dead Set blends sharp satire and gleeful gore with unexpectedly poignant -- and genuinely scary -- results." Metacritic, which uses a weighted average, assigned the series a score of 77 out of 100, based on 6 critics, indicating "generally favorable" reviews.

Reviewers frequently focused on the series' central conceit of combining a Big Brother-style reality-TV setting with a zombie outbreak. In The Guardian, Chris Moran described it as an "absurdly high concept" that had been translated to the screen "with real confidence and skill", arguing that the reality-television setting allowed Brooker to make "a sly dig at society" rather than merely stage a genre exercise. Writing in The New York Times, Mike Hale similarly said that Dead Set "deftly makes the connections between reality television and zombification", though he added that "on balance it plays like a well-made and increasingly grim horror picture" rather than a straightforward comedy.

Commentary also highlighted the show's balance of horror and comedy. Phil Newton of Dread Central wrote that Brooker "gets that delicate balance of humour and horror just right", and said the production's use of the real Big Brother house and associated iconography made the premise feel "totally authentic", which in turn made the satire more effective. Moran likewise wrote that Brooker's wit had "made the journey intact" from page to screen, and praised the production for its "zip, conviction and style". Barry Garron of The Hollywood Reporter, by contrast, called it an "odd mixture of parody and putrid violence" that was "neither as suspenseful nor as clever as it pretends to be", and argued that it had a "frightening lack of suspense". Newton's main reservation was that the story's timeline "feels a little erratic in places".

Several reviews singled out performances and characterisation. Moran wrote that Jaime Winstone brought "just the right blend of vulnerability and strength" to Kelly, while Newton said Andy Nyman "totally nails the role of Patrick" and argued that Dead Set was "worth watching for his performance alone". Garron also found Patrick "by far the show's most interesting character", but felt that, aside from Kelly, most of the characters were "so lacking in humanity that the transition to zombie isn't much of a leap".

Discussion of the show's place within zombie fiction included debate over its depiction of fast-moving zombies. In a column for The Guardian, Simon Pegg called the series "smart, inventive and enjoyable", but objected to its use of fast zombies, arguing that such creatures were "bereft of poetic subtlety". Brooker responded that the zombies had to run "or the story wouldn't work", and also argued that "running zombies are, to be frank, cheaper than stumbling ones".

=== Accolades ===
At the British Academy Television Awards in 2009, Dead Set was nominated for the Drama Serial award, losing to Criminal Justice. At the British Academy Television Craft Awards the same year, its interactive promotional campaign won the Interactive Creative Contribution award, and Brooker received a nomination for Breakthrough Talent.

=== Legacy ===
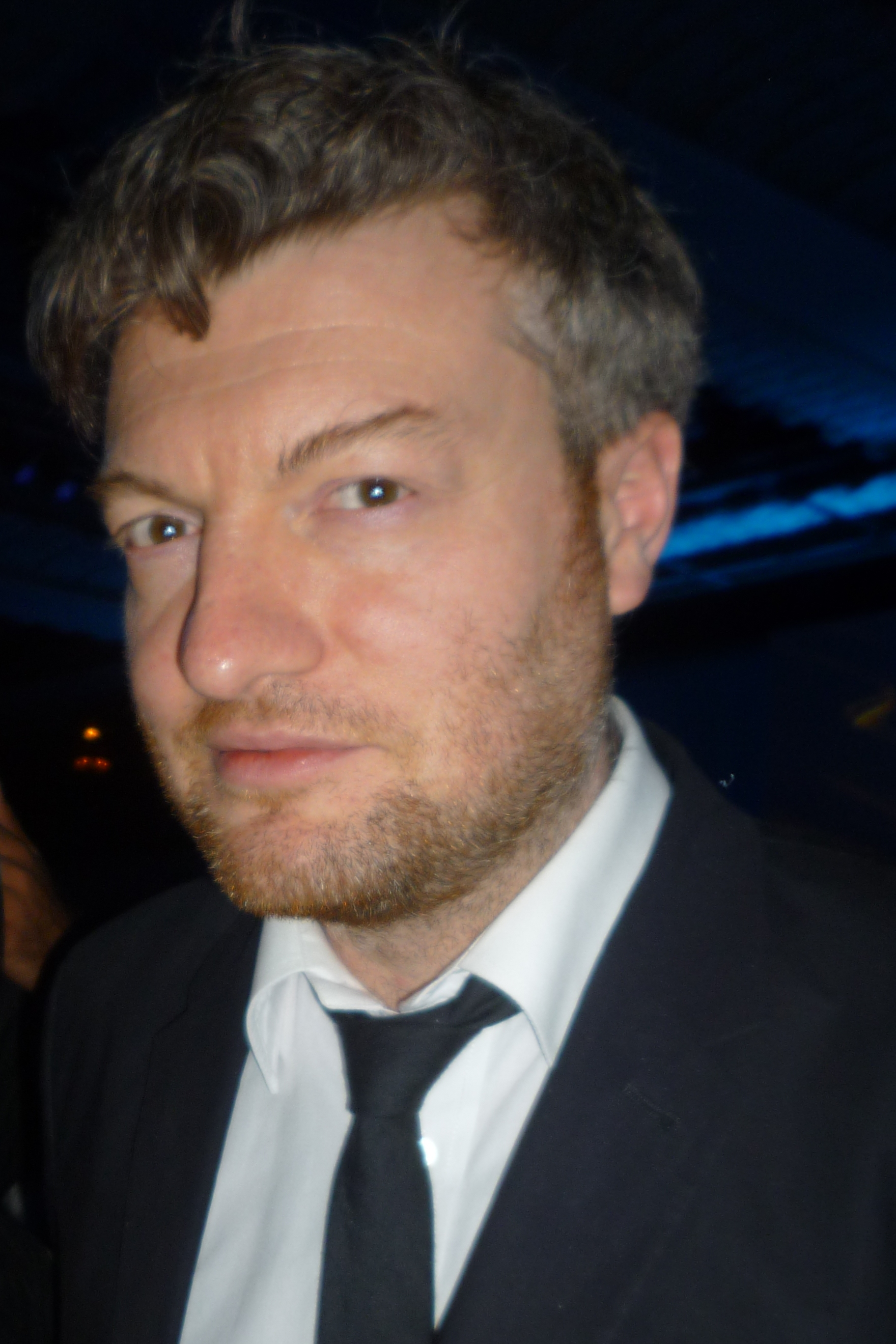
Dead Set creator Charlie Brooker

Retrospective commentary has described Dead Set as a precursor to Brooker's later anthology series Black Mirror. Brooker said in an interview that the series "contains all of Black Mirror's DNA". Scholarly writing has similarly treated Dead Set as part of Brooker's broader body of dark satirical television, including Black Mirror.

In 2013, the fourteenth series of Big Brother featured a quarantine-themed task involving a fictional viral outbreak which was reported to have been inspired by Dead Set. Brooker later wrote that the production team had checked that he did not mind the reference.

In 2019, Netflix announced the Brazilian series Reality Z, a local adaptation of Dead Set, which premiered in 2020.

During the COVID-19 pandemic, media coverage of Big Brother contestants emerging from isolation into a changed outside world drew comparisons to the premise of Dead Set.

=== Themes and analysis ===
Academic discussion of Dead Set has focused on masculinity, surveillance and spectatorship. Lauren Stephenson argues that the series offers a "timely portrait of British masculinity on the brink of crisis", and that older masculine ideals are "tested, renegotiated and found wanting". She also suggests that the Big Brother setting encourages performative identity under constant surveillance, creating parallels between the housemates and the undead as objectified spectacles; even the zombies, she notes, continue "performative practices of the living (watching television, in particular)".

Stephen Webley likewise places Dead Set in the social satire associated with George A. Romero. He argues that the Big Brother format was "ready-made for a Romeroesque satire", and that the miniseries portrays reality television as a "shockingly obscene form of entertainment". He further connects the series' emphasis on surveillance with its ending, arguing that, like the gaze of the camera in Big Brother, "everyone is a zero-sum universalized commodity". For Webley, the closing image of Kelly on the monitors, watched by the undead, turns the finale into a commentary on both ideological spectatorship and media consumption.

== See also ==
- One Cut of the Dead
- Siberia (TV series), a fictional reality show that turns into a supernatural horror

== Bibliography ==
- Stephenson, Lauren (2019). ""I'm pissed off, and I'm angry, and we need your permission to kill someone": Frustrated Masculinities in Charlie Brooker's Dead Set (2008)". In Gerrard, Steven; Holland, Samantha; Shail, Robert (eds.). Gender and Contemporary Horror in Television (PDF). Emerald Studies in Popular Culture and Gender. Emerald Publishing Limited. pp. 107–116. ISBN 9781787691049.
- Webley, Stephen (2016). ""The Limeys Are Coming Barbara, and They're Laughing!": The Art of the Romeroesque in Shaun of the Dead and Dead Set". In Miller, Cynthia J.; Van Riper, A. Bowdoin (eds.). The Laughing Dead: The Horror-Comedy Film from Bride of Frankenstein to Zombieland (PDF). Rowman & Littlefield. pp. 39–58. ISBN 9781442268326.
