= Big Brother (British TV series) series 6 =

Coordinates: 51°39′23″N 0°16′02″W

Big Brother
- Series 6
- Series six logo
- Presented by: Davina McCall
- No. of days: 78
- No. of housemates: 16
- Winner: Anthony Hutton
- Runner-up: Eugene Sully
- Companion shows: Big Brother's Little Brother; Big Brother's Big Mouth; Big Brother Live; Diary Room Uncut; Nominations Uncut
- No. of episodes: 90

Release
- Original network: Channel 4
- Original release: 27 May – 12 August 2005

Series chronology
- ← Previous; Series 5 Next → Series 7

Big Brother 2005, also known as Big Brother 6, is the sixth series of the British reality television series Big Brother. The show followed sixteen contestants, known as housemates, who were isolated from the outside world for an extended period in a custom-built House. One or more housemates were evicted by a public vote each week. The last remaining housemate, Anthony Hutton, was declared the winner, winning a cash prize of £50,000. Runner-up Eugene Sully also won the same amount during a task two days before the final.

The series launched on Channel 4 on 27 May 2005 and ended on 12 August 2005, lasting 78 days – the fifth longest British edition of Big Brother. Davina McCall returned as presenter for her sixth consecutive year. Thirteen housemates entered on launch night, with three more being introduced in the fourth week. An average of 4.6 million viewers watched the series, the fourth highest viewed series of the show to date (joint with Big Brother 4).

Big Brother 6 received viewer complaints and press attention for various controversial scenes.

== Housemates ==
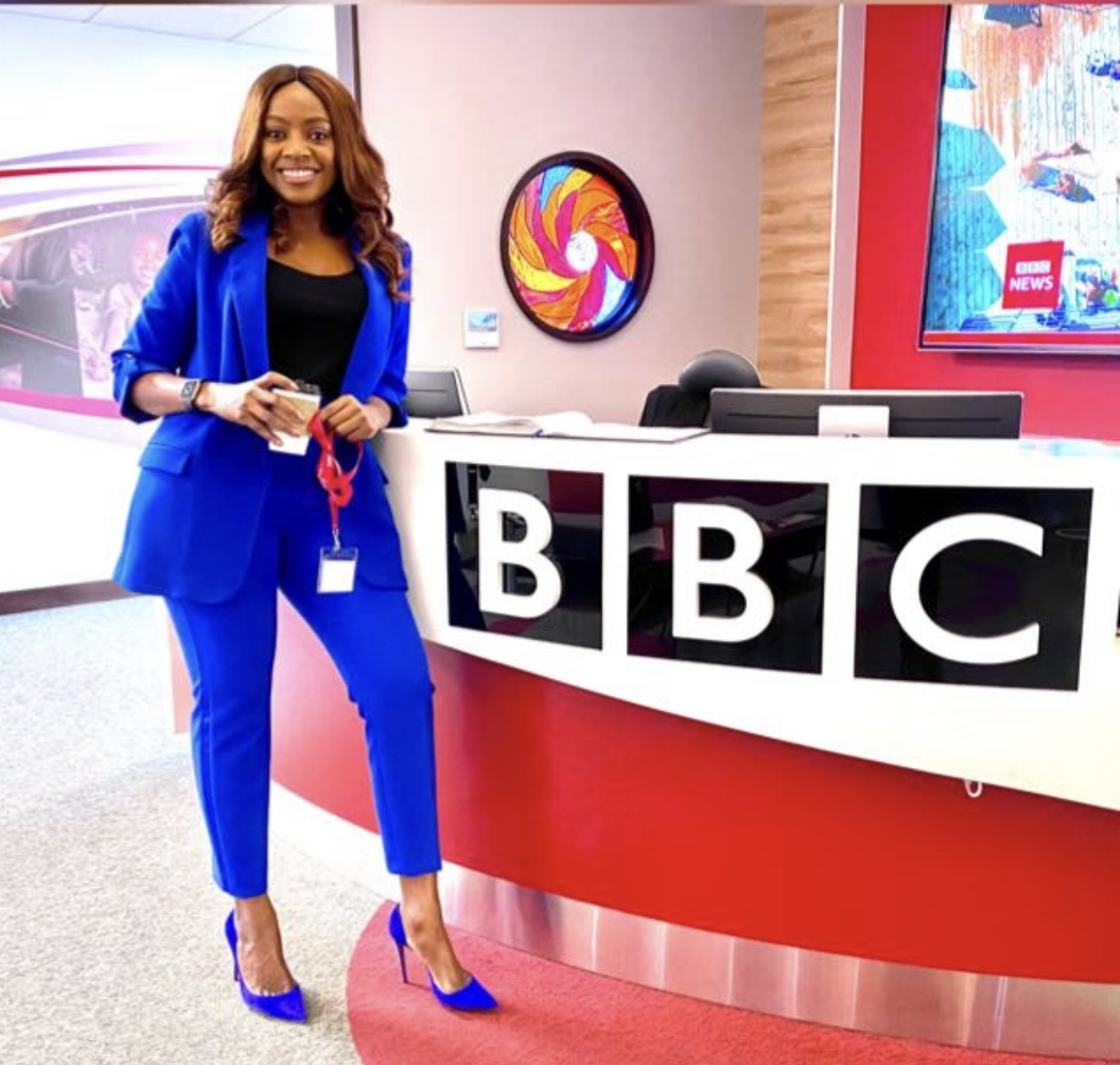
Makosi Musambasi

Thirteen housemates entered the House on Day 1. In week 5, three other housemates entered the Secret Garden. Makosi then chose two of them to join the main House: Orlaith and Eugene. When Orlaith voluntarily left weeks later, Kinga, the third housemate from the Secret Garden, re-entered the House.

Name	Age on entry	Hometown	Day entered	Day exited	Result
Anthony Hutton	23	Newcastle	1	78	Winner
Eugene Sully	27	Crawley	29	78	Runner-up (Note: Big Brother called a random Housemate to the Diary Room on Day 76, and Eugene was first to respond. Big Brother offered Eugene the option of winning half of the prize fund (£50,000), leaving the other half for the winner. Big Brother told the remaining Housemates if Eugene declined the offer, the prize fund would double to £200,000. Eugene was given one minute to decide and accepted Big Brother's offer and took half of the winner's prize fund.)
Makosi Musambasi	24	Buckinghamshire (originally from Zimbabwe)	1	78	3rd place
Kinga Karolczak	20	London	29	32	4th place (Note: Eugene, Kinga and Orlaith entered the Secret Garden, a secret area in the House, on Day 29. Makosi was tasked with evicting one Housemate from the Secret Garden on Day 32; she chose Kinga. Orlaith voluntarily left the House (known as walking) on Day 65. Kinga re-entered the House on Day 66 as Orlaith's replacement.)
Kinga Karolczak	20	London	66	78	4th place
Craig Coates	20	Norfolk	1	76	Evicted
Derek Laud	40	London	1	71	Evicted
Orlaith McAllister	26	Belfast	29	65	Walked
Kemal Shahin	19	London	1	64	Evicted
Kieron "Science" Harvey	22	Leeds	1	57	Evicted
Vanessa Layton-McIntosh	19	London	1	50	Evicted
Maxwell Ward	24	London	1	43	Evicted
Saskia Howard-Clarke	23	London	1	36	Evicted
Roberto Conte	32	Liverpool (originally from Italy)	1	29	Evicted
Sam Heuston	23	London	1	22	Evicted
Lesley Sanderson	19	Huddersfield	1	15	Evicted
Mary O'Leary	30	Dublin	1	8	Evicted

== Nominations table ==
	Week 1		Week 2	Week 3	Week 4	Week 5	Week 6	Week 7		Week 8	Week 9	Week 10	Week 11 Final		Nominations received
	Day 5	Day 6	Week 2	Week 3	Week 4	Week 5	Week 6	Nominations	Eviction	Week 8	Week 9	Week 10	Week 11 Final		Nominations received
Anthony	Derek, Makosi	Not eligible	~~Derek,~~; ~~Vanessa~~	Derek, Sam	Derek, Vanessa	Banned	Derek, Science	Derek, Kemal	Vanessa	Science, Orlaith	Craig, Makosi	Derek, Eugene	Winner (Day 78)		11
Eugene	Not in House					Secret; Garden	Anthony, Maxwell	Refused	Vanessa	Science, Orlaith	Craig, Derek	Makosi, Anthony	Runner-up (Day 78)		6
Makosi	Roberto, Anthony	Mary, Craig	~~Derek,~~; ~~Sam~~	Roberto, Derek	Science, Anthony	Maxwell, Saskia	Orlaith, Maxwell	Refused	Nominated	Kemal, Derek	Eugene, Anthony	Derek, Eugene	Third place (Day 78)		12
Kinga	Not in House					Secret; Garden	Evicted (Day 32)					Makosi, Craig	Fourth place (Day 78)		0
Craig	Makosi, Kemal	Not eligible	~~Sam,~~; ~~Saskia~~	Banned	Makosi, Derek	Science, Makosi	Kemal, Science	Derek, Eugene	Vanessa	Science, Makosi	Anthony, Orlaith	Eugene, Derek	Evicted (Day 76)		7
Derek	Sam, Saskia	Not eligible	~~Sam,~~; ~~Saskia~~	Banned	Maxwell, Anthony	Saskia, Maxwell	Maxwell, Anthony	Refused	Vanessa	Science, Orlaith	Eugene, Kemal	Anthony, Craig	Evicted (Day 71)		27
Orlaith	Not in House					Secret; Garden	Eugene, Maxwell	Refused	Vanessa	Kemal, Derek	Anthony, Craig	Walked (Day 65)			5
Kemal	Maxwell, Sam	Not eligible	~~Roberto,~~; ~~Derek~~	Roberto, Science	Roberto, Science	Saskia, Maxwell	Anthony, Maxwell	Science, Makosi	Makosi	Science, Orlaith	Derek, Makosi	Evicted (Day 64)			7
Science	Roberto, Maxwell	Not eligible	~~Maxwell,~~; ~~Derek~~	Maxwell, Saskia	Derek, Roberto	Craig, Maxwell	Maxwell, Craig	Refused	Vanessa	Craig, Derek	Evicted (Day 57)				18
Vanessa	Sam, Roberto	Not eligible	~~Sam,~~; ~~Saskia~~	Sam, Roberto	Science, Derek	Maxwell, Saskia	Science, Eugene	Refused	Nominated	Evicted (Day 50)					13
Maxwell	Makosi, Vanessa	Not eligible	~~Derek,~~; ~~Science~~	Roberto, Sam	Roberto, Derek	Banned	Kemal, Science	Evicted (Day 43)							17
Saskia	Mary, Craig	Not eligible	~~Derek,~~; ~~Lesley~~	Roberto, Derek	Derek, Roberto	Makosi, Science	Evicted (Day 36)								11
Roberto	Science, Vanessa	Exempt	~~Vanessa,~~; ~~Sam~~	Banned	Vanessa, Kemal	Evicted (Day 29)									15
Sam	Vanessa, Derek	Exempt	~~Lesley,~~; ~~Derek~~	Roberto, Maxwell	Evicted (Day 22)										13
Lesley	Sam, Makosi	Not eligible	~~Sam,~~; ~~Saskia~~	Evicted (Day 15)											2
Mary	Saskia, Roberto	Not eligible	Evicted (Day 8)												2
Note	1		2	3	none	4	none	5		none	6	7	8		
Against public vote	~~Makosi,~~; ~~Roberto,~~; ~~Sam~~	Craig, Mary	Anthony, Craig, Derek, Kemal, Lesley, Makosi, Maxwell, Roberto, Sam, Saskia, Science, Vanessa	Derek, Roberto, Sam	Derek, Roberto	Maxwell, Saskia	Maxwell, Science	Derek, Eugene, Makosi, Orlaith, Science, Vanessa	Makosi, Vanessa	Orlaith, Science	Kemal, Orlaith	Derek, Eugene	Anthony, Craig, Eugene, Kinga, Makosi		
Walked	none											Orlaith	none		
Evicted	None	Mary; 60% to evict	Lesley; 36% to evict	Sam; 59% to evict	Roberto; 53% to evict	Kinga; Makosi's choice to evict	Maxwell; 57% to evict	None	Vanessa; 6 of 7 votes to evict	Science; 50.5% to evict	Kemal; 51.1% to evict	Derek; 58% to evict	Craig; 3.9% (out of 5)	Kinga; 4.1% (out of 4)	
Evicted	None	Mary; 60% to evict	Lesley; 36% to evict	Sam; 59% to evict	Roberto; 53% to evict	Kinga; Makosi's choice to evict	Maxwell; 57% to evict	None	Vanessa; 6 of 7 votes to evict	Science; 50.5% to evict	Kemal; 51.1% to evict	Derek; 58% to evict	Makosi; 8.7% (out of 3)	Eugene; 42.7% (out of 2)	
Evicted	None	Mary; 60% to evict	Lesley; 36% to evict	Sam; 59% to evict	Roberto; 53% to evict	Saskia; 71% to evict	Maxwell; 57% to evict	None	Vanessa; 6 of 7 votes to evict	Science; 50.5% to evict	Kemal; 51.1% to evict	Derek; 58% to evict	Makosi; 8.7% (out of 3)	Eugene; 42.7% (out of 2)	
Evicted	None	Mary; 60% to evict	Lesley; 36% to evict	Sam; 59% to evict	Roberto; 53% to evict	Saskia; 71% to evict	Maxwell; 57% to evict	None	Vanessa; 6 of 7 votes to evict	Science; 50.5% to evict	Kemal; 51.1% to evict	Derek; 58% to evict	Anthony; 57.3% to win		

Notes

- ^Note 1: Makosi was told on Day 1 that the housemates who received the most nominations that week would be immune from the first eviction. She was, therefore, given the secret mission of trying to get the most nominations that week. She succeeded in her task, receiving the most nominations along with Roberto and Sam, who were now immune. She then had to nominate two housemates to face eviction, as all the other housemates' nominations became voided. She nominated Mary and Craig.
- ^Note 2: As punishment for Vanessa discussing nominations, all housemates automatically faced eviction, and their nominations were voided. Derek and Sam would have faced the public vote if this had not happened.
- ^Note 3: As punishment for discussing nominations, Craig, Derek and Roberto were banned from nominating.
- ^Note 4: Anthony and Maxwell were banned from nominating as punishment for discussing nominations. After Roberto's eviction, three new housemates entered the secret garden, secretly living alongside the original housemates. As Makosi was on a secret mission, she had to evict one person from the secret garden, and the other two entered the house. Makosi chose to evict Kinga, and Eugene and Orlaith entered the house.
- ^Note 5: Big Brother set the housemates a task, telling them Big Brother would lie to them twice. Big Brother told the housemates that the week's nominations were optional. This was the first lie. As always, nominations were compulsory; those who did not would face the public vote. Only Anthony, Craig and Kemal nominated – saving them from the public vote. Big Brother then told the second lie by announcing that the housemates up for eviction were Anthony, Craig and Kemal, when in fact, they were the only housemates not up. On eviction night, Makosi and Vanessa were announced to have received the most votes, and the remaining housemates had to decide whom to evict. Vanessa was evicted with six votes, with only Kemal voting to evict Makosi.
- ^Note 6: Instead of nominating those that they wanted to evict, the housemates had to nominate those who they wanted to stay in the house, with the two or more housemates with the least nominations facing the public vote.
- ^Note 7: After Orlaith walked, Kinga entered the house. She was instantly set on a secret mission in which she needed to get at least one person not to nominate her. If one person failed to nominate her, she would gain immunity and appear in the final week. She passed her task as none of the housemates nominated her.
- ^Note 8: There were no nominations in the final week. On Day 76, a vote count was taken, and the housemate who had received the fewest votes would be immediately evicted, leaving four housemates in the final. This housemate was Craig, leaving Anthony, Eugene, Kinga, and Makosi in the final four.

== Weekly summary ==
Week 1	Entrances	On Day 1, Derek, Lesley, Sam, Maxwell, Vanessa, Anthony, Roberto, Makosi, Craig, Mary, Science, Saskia and Kemal entered the house.
Week 1	Tasks	The "unlucky thirteenth" housemate was chosen randomly on Day 1 as Makosi when she was first to respond to a call by Big Brother for "a housemate" to go to the Diary Room. Makosi was told she would automatically be up for eviction that week unless she managed to get the most nominations from her housemates. She had to nominate two people for eviction. She was to keep this task secret. Makosi succeeded in her secret mission and chose Craig and Mary to be up for eviction instead.; On Day 3, housemates painted portraits of each other to hang in the living area.; On Day 4, housemates had to perform a rap about each other to win Mary a birthday party.
Week 1	Nominations	On Day 5, Makosi, Roberto, and Sam received the most votes and faced the public vote. However, due to Makosi passing her secret mission, these nominations were cancelled, and she got to choose the real two nominees. She nominated Craig and Mary, and they faced the public vote.
Week 1	Exits	On Day 8, Mary was evicted from the house, receiving 60% of the public vote.
Week 2	Tasks	On Day 9, housemates had to participate in a counting task where each housemate had to count as high as possible while being distracted by Big Brother. Saskia won the task and was awarded the chance to become Big Brother for a week. She was allowed to watch selected Diary Room sessions, create punishments, and fulfil or reject housemate requests.; On Day 12, housemates had to participate in the "Big Brother Hospital Task" Roberto was randomly chosen to become the head doctor and chose Saskia, Science, and Vanessa as his nurses. Every other housemate was diagnosed with a problem and had to follow the rules of their injuries. Kemal, Lesley, Makosi and Vanessa didn't wear their hospital outfits on the third day and failed the task. Due to this, the House received a basic shopping budget for the next week.
Week 2	Punishments	Maxwell was given some underwear after requesting some from Big Brother. He was unhappy with the underwear he was given and burned them with a lighter. The next day, he was forced to wear a baby's outfit and sit on "The Naughty Step" for three hours.; In a conversation, Vanessa broke the game rules by telling Lesley whom she would nominate. Although the nominations still took place, Big Brother ignored the results and ruled that every housemate would be up for eviction for the first time in the UK series.
Week 2	Nominations	All housemates this week faced the public vote due to multiple rule-breaking.
Week 2	Exits	On Day 15, Lesley was evicted from the house, receiving 36% of the public vote.
Week 3	Tasks	On Day 16, the housemates participated in the Box Task. Each housemate had to sit in a cardboard box for as long as possible. The task winner received luxury meals and an unlimited supply of wine for the week. After 26 hours and 16 minutes, Anthony, Derek, and Roberto were announced as the joint winners of the task.; On Day 18, for the shopping task, housemates had to participate in a Pirate Task. All housemates, besides the captain, had to do various tasks involving being a pirate and were only allowed two fails per day. Science was randomly chosen as the captain. The housemates failed the task by incurring 28 fails in three days.; On Day 20, Big Brother held a speed dating task. Big Brother paired each housemate with three other housemates, and they had to go on two-minute dates with each of them.; On Day 22, Science requested toilet paper. Big Brother gave him a secret task. He was told that for every housemate he slapped on the bottom, he would receive one roll of toilet paper. Science slapped everyone but Anthony, Derek, and Maxwell and received seven rolls.
Week 3	Punishments	On Day 16, during the box task, Kemal put a dirty toilet brush into Roberto's box and was punished by being instructed to sit on the Naughty Step for two hours.; Craig, Derek, and Roberto were banned from nominating after discussing the nomination procedure, which broke a fundamental rule. Clips of their discussions (mainly concerning Saskia) were played into the House via the plasma screen in the living room.; On Day 20, Science received a formal warning for throwing water in Kemal's face, which Big Brother deemed unprovoked.
Week 3	Nominations	Derek, Roberto and Sam received the most votes and faced the public vote.
Week 3	Exits	On Day 22, Sam was evicted from the house, receiving 59% of the public vote.
Week 4	Tasks	On Day 23, the housemates participated in the "Chicken and Egg Task". Each housemate had to dress in a chicken suit and keep one hand on an egg at all times. Makosi was the only housemate to fail the task, and the rest of the housemates were given a party.; On Day 24, Big Brother set the housemates the Workhouse task. Maxwell selected himself as worker number one, automatically making him the unlucky worker. Maxwell was assigned to disgusting tasks such as sorting maggots. The actual task was for the other housemates to convince Maxwell that they, too, were performing the same tasks. In reality, Big Brother provided them with luxurious treats while Maxwell worked. The housemates passed the task and won a luxury budget.; On Day 27, Derek requested cigars and was given a secret mission to receive them. For every housemate that kissed him, he would receive one cigar. He received a kiss from every housemate, but because Saskia figured out it was a secret mission and told Science about it, he only received seven cigars.
Week 4	Punishments	On Day 24, Vanessa was initially supposed to be the unlucky housemate in the Workhouse task but backed out, and Maxwell took her spot. After it was revealed that they had passed the task, Vanessa was told that she was not allowed to eat anything bought on the shopping budget and instead, she would eat three meals a day given to her by Big Brother.
Week 4	Nominations	Derek and Roberto received the most votes and faced the public vote.
Week 4	Exits	On Day 29, Roberto was evicted from the house, receiving 53% of the public vote.
Week 5	Entrances	On Day 29, moments after Roberto was evicted, Eugene, Kinga and Orlaith entered the Secret Garden – a secret area in the house where they were forced to live 24 hours a day.
Week 5	Tasks	On Day 30, less than 24 hours after Kinga, Eugene, and Orlaith had entered the Secret Garden, a red button appeared in the main House. Makosi pressed the button and was immediately called to the Diary Room. She entered the Secret Garden, met Kinga, Eugene and Orlaith, and was instructed to help them by stealing food and other supplies from the main House. If she failed to do so or was discovered by her fellow housemates, she would be automatically put up for the public vote. Makosi was successful in her task.; Before completing the task, Makosi had to evict one housemate from the Secret Garden – she chose Kinga.; On Day 34, the housemates had to put on "Romeo and Juliet: The Ballet". Anthony played Romeo, and Orlaith played Juliet. They correctly reenacted the ballet and received a luxury shopping budget for the week.
Week 5	Punishments	For the third time, nominations had been discussed, this time between Maxwell and Anthony, so they were banned from nominating.
Week 5	Nominations	Maxwell and Saskia received the most votes and faced the public vote.
Week 5	Exits	On Day 32, Makosi decided to evict Kinga from the Big Brother Garden.; On Day 36, Saskia was evicted from the house, receiving 71% of the public vote.
Week 6	Tasks	On Day 37, the housemates were given a crying task. The housemates had to fill up one teaspoon with tears. The housemates passed the task and were rewarded with a luxury meal.; On Day 38, Big Brother sent the housemates on "holiday" as part of their shopping task. Vanessa was randomly chosen to become the leading "Holiday Rep". She chose Makosi and Orlaith to be her assistants. The Holiday Reps had to do everything they could to make the other housemates have an enjoyable holiday. The reps had to cook all the food for the housemates, start conga lines at random times of the day, organise beauty contests, and clean the House. The House incurred ten fails in three days and therefore failed the shopping task.; On Day 40, Eugene was on a secret mission to mimic a housemate to win a reward. The housemate he would mimic would be the first to interact directly with him. Because Makosi was the first to speak to him, he had to mimic her. But Makosi realised that Eugene was mimicking her, and he failed the task.; On Day 41, the housemates were given a Mass Debating task. Maxwell and Science had to choose teams, and the teams had to write speeches about why their chosen housemate should stay in the House. Maxwell chose Anthony, Derek, Kemal, and Orlaith for his team. Science chose Craig, Eugene, Makosi, and Vanessa for his team. Because Maxwell was evicted on Friday, Team Science received a party.
Week 6	Nominations	Maxwell and Science received the most votes and faced the public vote.
Week 6	Exits	On Day 43, Maxwell was evicted from the house, receiving 57% of the public vote.
Week 7	Tasks	On Day 44, Kemal was chosen to compete in a quiz where he would have to answer various general knowledge questions. He answered 9 out of 10 questions correctly and won video messages from home for all housemates.; Big Brother played mind games with the housemates, informing them that Big Brother would lie twice during the week. Big Brother then told housemates that nominations that week were optional. This was Big Brother's first lie. All nominations are compulsory, so the housemates who did not nominate were put to the public vote as punishment. When the results of the nominations were announced, Big Brother stated that Anthony, Craig and Kemal were up for eviction. This was Big Brother's second lie. In fact, these three were the only housemates to nominate, so it was everyone else who was subject to the public vote.; On Dat 46, Big Brother gave housemates a treasure-hunting task. The housemates located buried treasure in the garden and were rewarded with alcoholic cocktails.; On Day 47, the housemates were given a sporting arena task, the Big Brother Games, where selected housemates trained and competed in four events: synchronised swimming, rhythmic gymnastics, cycling and trampolining. Kemal was excused due to illness but opened the games by singing and commentating throughout. Points were awarded for each event; if the housemates accumulated 50 points or more during the competition, they would win a luxury shopping budget. The housemates’ total score as a group was 27 points, therefore they failed the task.
Week 7	Nominations	Derek, Eugene, Makosi, Orlaith, Science and Vanessa refused to nominate this week, so they faced the public vote.
Week 7	Exits	The housemates had to pick whom to evict out of the two people with the most votes. These were Makosi and Vanessa, with Makosi receiving the largest percentage of votes. Six of the seven housemates chose to evict Vanessa, with only Kemal voting to evict Makosi, meaning Vanessa was evicted on Day 50.
Week 8	Tasks	On Day 51, Anthony became the 2,000th Diary Room entrant. He won a date with Big Brother in the Diary Room as a reward, including chocolates, cocktails, oysters, and champagne.; On Day 52, the housemates were given a singing task. They had to communicate by singing. They succeeded and were rewarded with a tennis court and equipment in the garden.; On Day 53, the housemates had to become dog owners and trainers. They failed this task because of numerous failures and because Science ran away from his owner, Kemal.
Week 8	Nominations	Orlaith and Science received the most votes and faced the public vote.
Week 8	Exits	On Day 57, Science was evicted from the house, receiving 50.5% of the public vote.
Week 9	Tasks	On Day 60, instead of nominating two people to evict, the housemates each nominated two people they wished to save from the public vote. Kemal and Orlaith received the fewest nominations and, therefore, faced eviction.; The housemates were given a secret agent task to complete. Kemal was randomly selected to be a double agent for this task. The housemates failed to realise this, so they passed the task. Derek, who they thought was the Double Agent, was sent into hiding overnight.
Week 9	Nominations	Kemal and Orlaith received the fewest votes and faced the public vote.
Week 9	Exits	On Day 64, Kemal was evicted from the house, receiving 51.1% of the public vote.
Week 10	Entrances	On Day 66, Kinga re-entered the house to replace Orlaith.
Week 10	Tasks	On Day 66, as Kinga was sent in, she was told that if she got at least one person not to nominate her this week, she would be immune from eviction, in the House for the final week, and eligible to win. She managed to pass the task, receiving no nominations at all.; The housemates were given a rodeo task to complete. They had to master rodeo skills, such as sharp shooting, line dancing, lassoing, and riding the bucking bronco for a rodeo show. To be successful, they had to pass at least three of the four events. The housemates failed and received a basic shopping budget for the final week.
Week 10	Nominations	Derek and Eugene received the most votes and faced the public vote.
Week 10	Exits	On Day 65, Orlaith walked from the house.; On Day 71, Derek was evicted from the house, receiving 58% of the public vote.
Week 11	Tasks	On Day 72, Big Brother called a housemate to the Diary Room; Makosi went in and was given a red envelope as part of a special secret mission; she was asked to keep it hidden. Later, a gingerbread house was placed in the garden, and Makosi stepped inside; this turned out to be a cage that was then suspended above the garden. When Makosi was told to open the envelope, it simply said, "You Have Been Kidnapped". One by one, the other housemates were called to the Diary Room and offered treats; if they took the treat, Makosi would remain in the cage for a further thirty minutes. Only Eugene, the last housemate called, refused his treat. Makosi was kidnapped for a total of 3 hours and 15 minutes.; On Day 73, housemates were informed that they would be hypnotised, and if they all took part successfully, they would receive a reward. They were called to the Diary Room one by one and given the information that this was fake. They were each given a trigger word, and when it was said in the House, they should convince the other housemates, they were hypnotised to behave a certain way; for example, Anthony was given the trigger word "hot stuff" and told to pretend he was in a nightclub chatting up fellow housemates. All the housemates received the same secret mission and passed to receive a reward of cocktails and ice cream.; On Day 74, housemates were tasked with performing The Big Brother Play, where they would re-enact memorable moments playing past and present housemates, and they chose the genre of "arguments" to perform. They were successful and won an "after-show" party with non-alcoholic drinks.; On Day 76, housemates were given a cheerleading task. In costume, they had to perform a cheerleading routine. They were successful and received a takeaway as a reward.; About one hour after Craig was evicted, Big Brother called a housemate to the Diary Room, and Eugene responded first. He sat behind a suitcase containing £50,000 in cash – half the winner's prize money. Big Brother told him he could take this money, leaving the other half for the winner. Big Brother told the remaining housemates that the prize would double to £200,000 if he turned down the money. Eugene was given one minute to make his decision while he was watched on screen by the rest of the housemates. After about 50 seconds, Eugene made his decision and chose to take the £50,000. He was unaware of the possibility of doubling the prize until after his decision.
Week 11	Exits	On Day 76, during dinner, Craig was evicted in a surprise mid-week eviction due to having the fewest votes to win so far.; On Day 78, Kinga left the house in fourth place, and Makosi left the house in third place. It was revealed that Anthony was the winner, leaving Eugene as the runner-up.

== Production ==
=== Announcement and promotion ===
A teaser advertisement for Big Brother 2005

The sixth series of Big Brother was first confirmed in 2002, when Channel 4 made a deal with franchise owner Endemol to keep the show on the air until at least 2005. In early 2005, Channel 4 confirmed that Big Brother would return for its sixth series in the summer. After speculation that the "evil" theme from the previous series would not return, executive producer Sharon Powers told the press that Big Brother would "continue to be evil this year".

For the fifth year in a row, Channel 4 commissioned graphic designer Daniel Eatock to create the "Big Brother eye". The eye was a sliced mirror of alternating black and blue strips, in reality, two eyes on top of each other. It was publicly revealed on 30 April 2005. Promotional material included an art installation of the eye at the Truman Brewery in East London, constructed out of over 1000 cardboard boxes (some of which contained televisions).

On 9 May 2005, Channel 4 began airing countdown bumpers eighteen days before the launch.

=== Presenters and programming ===
Davina McCall, who had presented the show since its inception in 2000, was confirmed to return to the sixth series as presenter of the live shows, such as launch night, weekly evictions, the finale and other special live shows. Nightly highlights were broadcast on Channel 4, narrated by Marcus Bentley. Dermot O'Leary returned as presenter of Big Brother's Little Brother weekdays on Channel 4 and Sunday lunchtime. On E4, live coverage once again dominated its daily and nightly schedule, with additional live streaming online. Nominations Uncut and Diary Room Uncut also returned. Big Brother's EFourum – introduced in the previous year – was revamped and its name changed to Big Brother's Big Mouth, with Russell Brand continuing as presenter of that show. It was also announced that E4 would be available on the Freeview platform from May 2005 to coincide with the beginning of the series.

=== Housemates and prize ===
For the second year, open auditions were used to select housemates; these took place between 5 February and 6 March 2005. The broadcaster told the press that there would be thirteen housemates with a theme of "unlucky thirteen", inspired by triskaidekaphobia.

The winner stood to earn £100,000; however, two days before the final, housemate Eugene was given a dilemma: to take half of the prize money from the grand prize given by Big Brother. He was unaware that refusing the money would have doubled the prize fund to £200,000. He took the money, which meant that the eventual winner, Anthony, only won £50,000 (the same as Eugene).

=== The House ===
Presenter Davina McCall tours the House. She is standing in the bedroom, and behind her, from left to right, are the dining table, Diary Room, living area, and kitchen.

The House for Big Brother 2005 was a radical change from the oppressive and angled House from the previous year. House designer Patrick Watson described the design as "aspirational and yet not wildly practical". Although the House was still quite small, light pale colours and high camera angles gave the viewer the impression that the House is larger than it is. Watson also revealed that he accomplished this by extensively utilising mirrors for an airier and cooler atmosphere. Channel 4 described the House as the boldest one at the time, and Watson stated it to be complementary to "iPod neutrality".

Pictures of the House were released on 24 May 2005, revealing the outdoor shower and pool. There was a row of three outdoor showers that replaced the need for a complete bathroom; two other toilets were contained indoors, one in the living room and one in the bedroom. The tiled floor lead onto the wooden deck of the pool, and this year, a circular pool is positioned in a corner of the garden. The other side of the showers lead towards the slightly elevated glass-box lounge that originally had multi-levelled green couches but were eventually replaced with low orange ones.

More pictures were released to the press later in the day. These depicted the exterior of the Diary Room: a chaotic web of sliced and angled mirrors giving housemates a distorted reflection of the rest of the House. These pictures also showed that the House was composed of one central, column-free, airy room with cream-coloured carpeting on which the dining table rested and an elevated kitchen containing a row of yellow cabinets. An American-style refrigerator was utilised for the first time, giving the housemates more space for food. It was located next to the storeroom. However, the glass wall that allowed housemates to view the bedroom from the living area was disguised as a mirror to ensure that viewers would not be able to count how many housemates would be in the House. Finally, only a few days before launch night, pictures of a loft in the garden leaked to the press. On Day 1, it was shown that it was painted green rather than the pink shown in the pictures. It was also revealed that the bedroom would contain a "heat-seeking" thermal camera.

==== The Secret Garden ====
On the opposite side of the main Diary Room entrance was another door leading to the "Secret Garden". The Secret Garden was an indoor room decorated like a jungle. It contained a fridge, basic cooking utensils and crockery, a hatch, three beds, a decorative stag head (revealed to be able to speak), a television screen and an adjoining toilet. The Garden also contained a telephone that Big Brother used to communicate quietly with the secret housemates and a "Quiet" sign that illuminated whenever one of the main housemates occupied the Diary Room.

It was first used on Day 29, when housemates Kinga Karolczak, Orlaith McAllister and Eugene Sully secretly entered the House minutes after Roberto Conte was evicted. The three housemates had to live in the Secret Garden for several days, with only Makosi knowing their existence. The only clothing initially supplied to the three secret housemates was fig-leaf underwear. With Makosi's help, they had to steal clothes and food from the main Big Brother House when the other housemates were asleep and to make sure that the other housemates did not find out about them. The secret housemates stayed in the Secret Garden until Day 32 when Makosi selected Orlaith and Eugene to enter the main House and become actual housemates.

== Reception ==
Big Brother 6 received mixed reviews from professional critics. While one critic called the show "dull and unlikeable", another called it "refreshing viewing". Charlie Brooker called the series "foul and unsettling", and wrote an article criticising most of the housemates individually.

Eleven years after the conclusion of Big Brother 6, columnist Rupert Hawksley opined that the series potentially marked "the moment when Big Brother began its ongoing gurgle in the gutter".

=== Viewership ===
These viewing figures are taken from BARB.

Viewers (in millions)
	Week 1		Week 2	Week 3	Week 4	Week 5	Week 6	Week 7	Week 8	Week 9	Week 10	Week 11
Sat	–	3.56	2.91	3.46	2.59	3.11	2.65	2.46	2.91	2.49	3.1	2.49
Sun	–	4.04	4.18	4.13	2.85	4.72	4.6	4.18	4.12	4.16	5.28	4.22
Mon	–	3.82	3.95	3.29	3.67	4.93	5.26	4.9	5.13	4.56	5.17	4.96
Tue	–	3.86	4.47	4.11	4.67	5.77	4.76	4.75	4.41	4.39	5.31	4.64
Wed	-	4.82	4.14	4.1	4.67	5.42	5.21	4.61	4.57	4.25	4.87	4.17
Wed	-	4.82	4.14	4.1	4.67	5.42	5.21	4.61	4.57	4.25	4.87	6.63
Thu	–	4.63	3.87	4.36	4.15	5.71	4.86	4.7	4.22	5.25	4.61	4.8
Fri	6.04	4.23	4.34	3.99	4.69	5.31	5.2	5.19	4.52	4.35	4.96	6.63
Fri	6.04	5.22	5.41	4.73	4.69	6.55	5.84	6.4	5.19	5.59	5.56	7.65
Weekly average	4.47		4.16	4.02	3.9	5.19	4.8	4.65	4.38	4.38	4.86	5.13
Running average	4.47		4.32	4.23	4.15	4.36	4.43	4.47	4.45	4.45	4.49	4.55
Series average	4.55											

=== Criticism and controversy ===
Throughout the sixth series, Big Brother was subject to numerous complaints from the viewing public. While some were generalised concerns about the welfare of the housemates, others referred to specific incidents, including but not limited to: Maxwell's claim to have put scabs from his feet into Science's food; scenes filmed in the pool that led some viewers, and housemates, to believe that Anthony and Makosi had sex; Craig allegedly making "unwelcome advances" towards Anthony; Kinga allegedly masturbating with a wine bottle; hostility directed towards Makosi by the live crowd and, allegedly, Davina McCall during the Live Final; and Channel 4 breaking the Advertising Standards Authority's code. There was also commentary by some viewers, and by some housemates themselves, on what appeared to be a clear racial divide between groups that formed in the House. In one group were Anthony, Craig, Maxwell, and Saskia (all of whom are white British). In the other were Derek (Jamaican descent), Kemal (Turkish Cypriot), Makosi (Zimbabwean), Science (black) and Vanessa (black).

Media regulator Ofcom, which received over 900 complaints about the series, opined in response that Big Brother "offers viewers, unpalatable though it may be, a window on what some complainants believed to be the unacceptable attitudes of some members of society". Although Ofcom did not uphold any of the viewers' complaints about the series as a whole, they were particularly critical of the pool scenes and the scene involving Kinga and the wine bottle, stating that such scenes "operated at the limits of acceptability in terms of potential harm and/or offence for a programme of this nature, broadcast on this channel and at this time".

== Legacy ==
In 2008, Charlie Brooker created and wrote the horror mini-series Dead Set, set during a fictional series of Big Brother. It featured several former Big Brother contestants in cameo roles, including Eugene Sully, Kinga Karolczak, Makosi Musambasi and Saskia Howard-Clarke from Big Brother 6.

Housemates Makosi and Craig returned to Big Brother in 2009 as part of a retrospective week of that series, involving tasks from all previous series of Big Brother. They competed against Siavash Sabbaghpour in a recreation of the sixth series' Box task, where housemates had to remain in a cardboard box for the longest time.

In 2010, Makosi was a contestant in the show's final series, entitled Ultimate Big Brother, which featured memorable housemates from the first 11 series of Big Brother and its celebrity spin-off. She entered on Day 1 and became the second Ultimate housemate to be evicted on Day 11. Anthony also returned as a guest to have a picnic date with Makosi.

The first three seasons of the Serbian Big Brother series, Veliki brat, used the Big Brother eye logo and the opening titles from this series.
