= Ameet Chana =

British-Indian actor (born 1975)

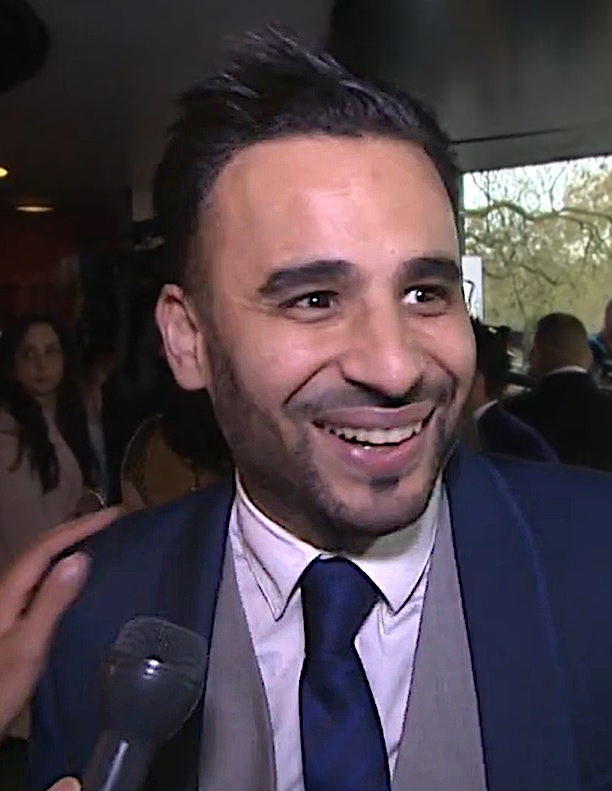
- Ameet Chana at the Asian Awards London, in 2015
- Born: Ameet Chana; 12 September 1975 (age 51); Epsom, Surrey, England
- Occupations: Actor; producer
- Years active: 1992–present
- Spouse: Shikha Varma (m. 2006)

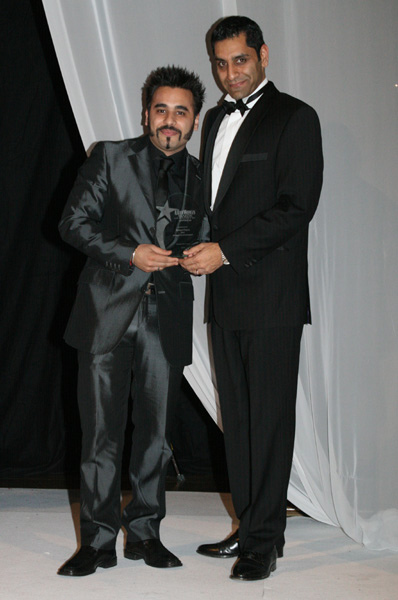
British Indian actor, Ameet Chana (left) receiving the Asian Woman Award for Excellence in entertainment

Ameet Chana (born 12 September 1975 in Epsom, Surrey, England) is a British-Indian actor and producer. His most notable roles include playing Tony in the film Bend It Like Beckham (2002), and Adi Ferreira in EastEnders (2003–2005).

== Personal life ==
Chana was born 12 September 1975 in Epsom, Surrey, to Indo-British parents, his mother a Hindu Punjabi, and his father a Sikh Punjabi. He is married to barrister/actress Shikha Varma of 5 King's Bench Walk Chambers.

== Career ==
His most notable roles include playing Tony in the film Bend It Like Beckham (2002), and Adi Ferreira in EastEnders (2003–2005). In May 2006, he took over presenting the Breakdown Show (Bhangra Music) on BBC Asian Network (a National Radio Station).

== Filmography ==
- The Regime ... Shahab - Episode 4: Midnight Feast, (airdate: March 24, 2024)
- IRah ... Rafi (2024)
- Unhallowed Ground ... Jazz (2015)
- Corner Shop Show ... Samad (2014)
- Jab Tak Hai Jaan ... Amit (2012)
- Casualty ... Police guard (2010)
- YAA - Nachna (Music video) ... Guest dancer (2007)
- Cash and Curry (2007)
- Run, Fat Boy, Run (2007)
- Jhoom Barabar Jhoom ... Shahriyar (2007)
- It Could Be You (2005)
- EastEnders ... Adi Ferreira (2003–2005)
- Bend It Like Beckham ... Tony (2002)
- Goodbye, Mr Steadman ... Police Officer (2001)
- The League Of Gentlemen ... Shack (1999)
- Wild West ... Gurdeep (1992)

== See also ==
- List of British Sikhs
