= Ellesmere Port Church of England College =

Coordinates: 53.277°N 2.907°W

Location
- 164 Whitby Road; Ellesmere Port; Cheshire, CH65 6EA; England

Information
- Type: Academy
- Religious affiliation: Church of England
- Local authority: Cheshire West and Chester
- Trust: Frank Field Education Trust
- Department for Education URN: 146742 Tables
- Ofsted: Reports
- Principal: Stephen Murphy
- Gender: Coeducational
- Age: 11 to 19
- Enrolment: 582
- Website: epcollege.org

Ellesmere Port Church of England College (formerly University Church of England Academy) is a coeducational secondary school and sixth form located in Ellesmere Port, Cheshire. It was formed in 2009 by the merger of Ellesmere Port Specialist School of Performing Arts (located at Woodchurch Lane) and Cheshire Oaks High School (located at Stanney Lane).

The school was sponsored by the University of Chester Academies Trust, and at that time was called University of Chester CE Academy, but transferred to the Frank Field Education Trust in 2019.

== Admissions ==
The school accepts children of all faiths and none.

== History ==
=== Stanney Comprehensive School ===
In March 1985 at 1am, a fire caused £60,000 of damage to the sixth form block. Ellesmere Port was known for school vandalism. Five fire engines from Ellesmere Port and Chester fought the fire for 90 minutes.

=== Sutton High School/Ellesmere Port Specialist School of Performing Arts ===
SHS was originally split into two, a boys school and a girls school, in common with many schools at the time. The two schools were later merged, and the school buildings were split into five 'blocks':

Red Tower Home to Languages, R.E., Geography, History & the Sixth Form Common room
Blue Tower Home to Mathematics
Yellow Block. Home to Science. An extra block was built at the end of Yellow Block as the English Department, after the old English block was sold off to a private company.
Green Block Home to Woodwork, Metalwork, Engineering, Graphical Design, Art, Cookery, Business Studies, Media Studies and I.T.
The Older Original Section Of The School, which doubled as the exam hall & was the traditional home of both English and the performing arts lessons that have given the school its current name, part of the building was sold to create a privately owned business centre. English corridor. Home to English

The school had a swing band which in 1995, 2006, 2009, 2012 successfully toured Germany, appearing on German radio and television in the process.

In 2006, Sutton High School was awarded specialist Arts College status, and then became Ellesmere Port Specialist School of Performing Arts.

=== Stanney High School/Cheshire Oaks High School ===
COHS was founded as Stanney High School in 1947. In the 2000s it became a Specialist Sports College.

== Whitby Road site ==
The school is now located on a single campus at Whitby Road which opened in November 2012.
