= Danny Wood =

American pop singer (born 1969)

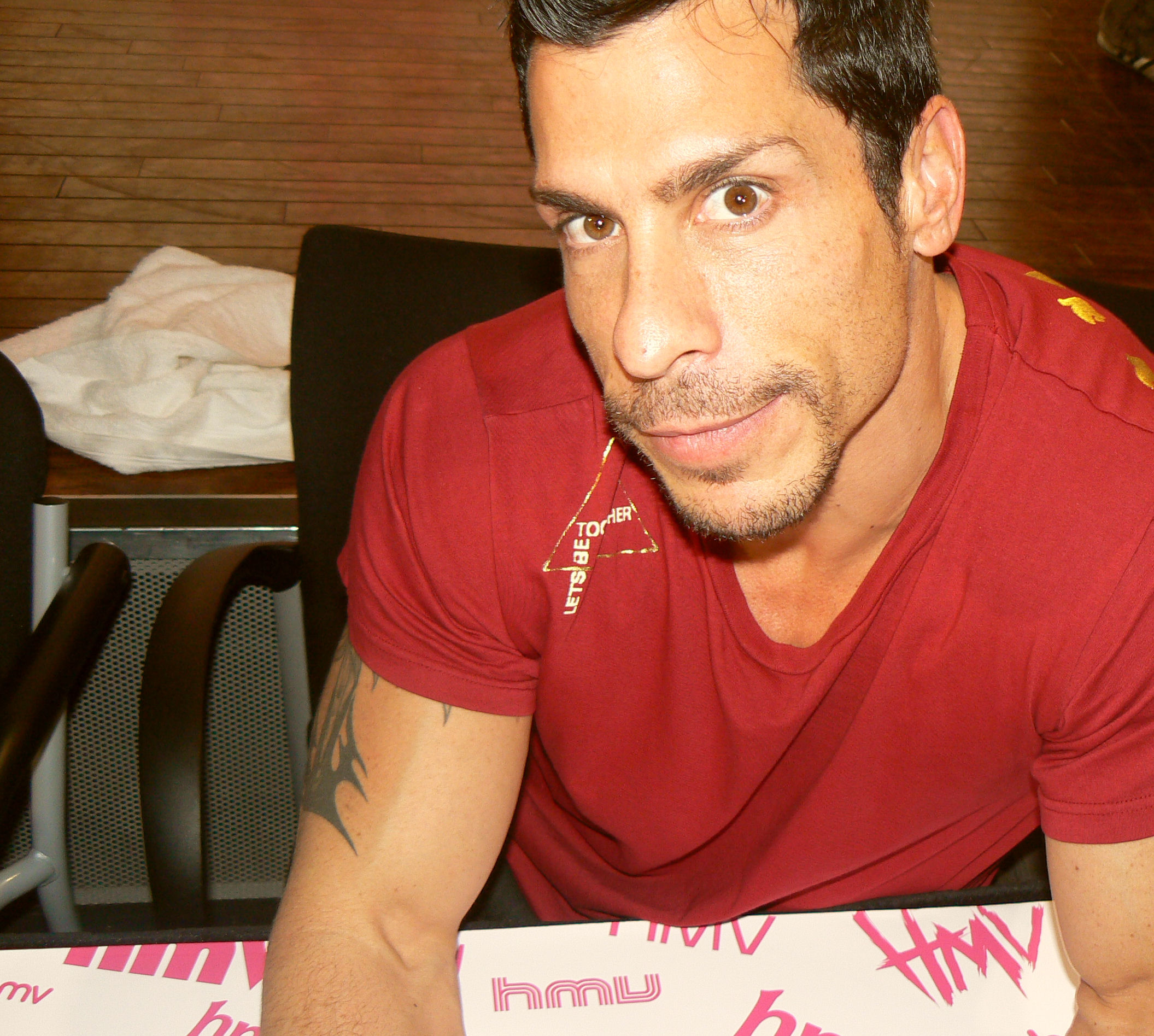
- Wood in 2008

Background information
- Born: Daniel William Wood; May 14, 1969 (age 57); Dorchester, Massachusetts, U.S.
- Genres: Pop
- Occupations: Singer, songwriter
- Years active: 1984–present
- Member of: New Kids on the Block
- Formerly of: NKOTBSB, Upper Street
- Website: www.nkotb.com

Daniel William Wood (born May 14, 1969) is an American singer and songwriter. He is a member of the boy band New Kids on the Block.

== Career ==
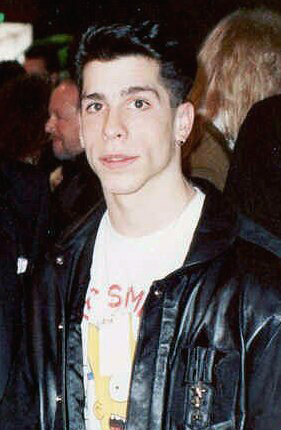
Wood at the 1990 Grammy Awards

Wood joined New Kids on the Block at the age of 16 after being recruited by friend and bandmate Donnie Wahlberg. Maurice Starr produced many of their releases. Wood has released seven solo albums.

== Personal life ==
Wood was married to Patricia Alfaro from 1997 to 2006. He is the father of three children, son Daniel Jr., and daughters Chance and Vega. In August 2019, Danny’s granddaughter was born, named Rose Elizabeth Wood.

Remember Betty is a charity that Wood set up in 2008 in memory of his mother who died, aged 55, of breast cancer in 1999. The mission of the charity is "to help minimize the financial burden associated with breast cancer for patients & survivors by providing direct financial support to them so that they can focus on recovery & quality of life."

In 2014, Wood ran the Boston Marathon to raise funds for Remember Betty. He finished the race in a time of 3:50:00. Fellow bandmate Joey McIntyre ran the marathon with Wood in support of the Alzheimer's Association.

== Discography ==
=== Albums ===
- D-Fuse: Room Full of Smoke (1999)
- D-Wood: Room Full of Smoke, Vol. 2 (2003)
- Second Face (2003)
- O.F.D: Originally from Dorchester (acoustic tour exclusive) (2008)
- Coming Home (2008)
- Stronger: Remember Betty (2009)
- Look at Me (2016)

=== Singles ===
- "What If" (2003)
- "When the Lights Go Out" (2003)
- "Different Worlds" (2003)
- "Look at Me" (2015)
- "Endlessly (Betty's Wish)" (2015)
- "Hold On" (2015)
