= NKOTBSB Tour =

2011–12 concert tour by NKOTBSB

- Tour by NKOTBSB
- Promotional poster for the tour
- Associated album: NKOTBSB
- Start date: May 25, 2011
- End date: June 3, 2012
- Legs: 2
- No. of shows: 80
- Website: www.nkotbsb.com
New Kids on the Block tour chronology
New Kids on the Block Live (2008–2010)	NKOTBSB Tour (2011–2012)	The Package Tour (2013)
Backstreet Boys tour chronology
This Is Us Tour (2009–2011)	NKOTBSB Tour (2011–2012)	In a World Like This Tour (2013–2015)

The NKOTBSB Tour was a co-headlining concert tour between American boy bands New Kids on the Block and the Backstreet Boys, who together formed NKOTBSB. The tour visited North America in 2011. Europe, Australia and Asia were added to the itinerary for 2012. The tour ranked 44th in Pollstar's "Top 50 Worldwide Tour (Mid-Year)", earning over 10 million dollars. At the conclusion of 2011, the tour placed 8th on Billboard's annual "Top 25 Tours", earning over $76 million with 51 shows.

The London concert on April 29, 2012 in O2 Arena was shown live at select movie theaters at 9PM CET and streamed live with pay per view system.

== Background ==
We were all on tour, not together at the same time, but we were pretty close on the road. NKOTB were wrapping up their summer run. We happened to be out and we ended up being on stage together. It was a magical moment [...] none of us will ever forget. Right after we performed together everybody on Twitter and Facebook...it was everywhere that we were going on tour. So we started talking about it and we made it happen.

— Brian Littrell, Entertainment Tonight

During the summer of 2010, the Backstreet Boys joined New Kids on the Block onstage at the Radio City Music Hall (as a part of NKOTB Casi-NO Tour), where the groups performed "I Want It That Way". Since the performance, the media began to circulate rumors of the two uniting for a tour in the summer of 2011.

The tour was officially announced on On Air with Ryan Seacrest during an interview, where it was mentioned the groups were recording a single to be later released. To promote the tour further, the groups conducted a live Q&A session on Ustream. The groups also performed at the 38th Annual American Music Awards to give the public a taste of what they would see on the tour. For an interview on Entertainment Tonight, Donnie Wahlberg held a picture of the proposed staging, which featured a standard concert stage with an extended catwalk leading to a circular platform.

== Opening acts ==
- Jordin Sparks (North America, May 25, 2011, May 29, 2011 - June 18, 2011, June 21, 2011 - July 1, 2011)
- Ashlyne Huff (United States, May 26, 2011 - June 3, 2011, June 12, 2011 - July 2, 2011)
- Midnight Red (United States, July 3, 2011)
- Matthew Morrison (North America, July 6, 2011 - August 7, 2011)
- Neverest (Canada, June 7 - June 9, 2011, August 4, 2011, August 6, 2011; Germany, May 6, 2012)
- A Friend in London (Europe, except Germany, April 24, 2012, May 2, 2012)
- Johnny Ruffo (Melbourne, May 18 - May 19, 2012)

== Setlist ==
NKOTBSB

1. Medley: "Single" / "The One" (contains elements of "Viva la Vida")

New Kids on the Block

2. "Summertime"

Backstreet Boys

3. "The Call"

New Kids on the Block

4. "Dirty Dancing"

Backstreet Boys

5. "Get Down (You're the One for Me)" (Replaced "Bye Bye Love" since the Chicago show on June 18, 2011)

New Kids on the Block

6. "You Got It (The Right Stuff)"

Backstreet Boys

7. "Larger Than Life"

New Kids on the Block

8. "Didn't I (Blow Your Mind This Time)"
9. "Valentine Girl"
10. "If You Go Away"
11. "Please Don't Go Girl"

Backstreet Boys

12. "Show Me the Meaning of Being Lonely"
13. "10,000 Promises"
14. "I'll Never Break Your Heart"
15. "Inconsolable" (North America Leg only)
16. "Drowning"
17. "Incomplete"

New Kids on the Block

18. "Step By Step" (contains elements of "Push It")
19. "Cover Girl"
20. "My Favorite Girl"(contains elements of "Poison")
21. "Games"
22. "Click Click Click" (North America Leg only)
23. "Tonight"

Backstreet Boys

24. "Shape of My Heart"
25. "As Long As You Love Me"
26. "All I Have to Give"
27. "If You Stay" (contains excerpts of "Raspberry Beret") (North America Leg only)
28. "We've Got It Goin' On" (Europe, Australia & Asia Leg only) (contains elements of "Can You Feel It")
29. "Quit Playing Games (With My Heart)" (contains elements of "Don't Stop 'Til You Get Enough")

New Kids on the Block

30. "I'll Be Loving You (Forever)"

Backstreet Boys

31. "I Want It That Way"

NKOTBSB

32. "Don't Turn Out the Lights"

Backstreet Boys

33. "Everybody (Backstreet's Back)" (contains elements of "Back in Black")

New Kids on the Block

34. "Hangin’ Tough" (contains excerpts from "We Will Rock You")

NKOTBSB

35. Medley: "Everybody (Backstreet's Back)" / "Hangin’ Tough" (Reprise)

Notes

- During the performance at the Staples Center, the supergroup was joined onstage by then-former member of the Backstreet Boys, Kevin Richardson. He performed "I Want It That Way" and "Everybody (Backstreet's Back)".
- During the performance at the Amway Center, the supergroup was joined onstage by Boyz II Men to perform their hit, "End of the Road".

== Tour dates ==
List of concerts, showing date, city, country, venue, opening act, tickets sold, number of available tickets and amount of gross revenue
Date	City	Country	Venue	Opening act	Attendance	Revenue
North America
May 25, 2011	Rosemont	United States	Allstate Arena	Jordin Sparks	9,586 / 12,425	$485,145
May 26, 2011	Grand Rapids	United States	Van Andel Arena	Ashlyne Huff	5,925 / 9,255	$384,009
May 28, 2011	Buffalo	United States	First Niagara Center	Ashlyne Huff	12,597 / 13,495	$608,165
May 29, 2011	Baltimore	United States	Royal Farms Arena	Jordin Sparks; Ashlyne Huff	7,445 / 12,547	$315,549
May 30, 2011	Uncasville	United States	Mohegan Sun Arena	Jordin Sparks; Ashlyne Huff	6,830 / 7,212	$616,290
June 2, 2011	Uncasville	United States	Mohegan Sun Arena	Jordin Sparks; Ashlyne Huff	6,830 / 7,212	$616,290
June 3, 2011	Washington, D.C.	United States	Verizon Center	Jordin Sparks; Ashlyne Huff	13,799 / 13,799	$1,054,068
June 4, 2011	Boston	United States	TD Garden	Jordin Sparks	13,224 / 13,224	$976,833
June 5, 2011	Philadelphia	United States	Wells Fargo Center	Jordin Sparks	15,355 / 15,355	$1,126,713
June 7, 2011	Montreal	Canada	Bell Centre	Jordin Sparks; Neverest	13,930 / 13,930	$1,079,770
June 8, 2011	Toronto	Canada	Air Canada Centre	Jordin Sparks; Neverest	30,562 / 30,562	$2,268,740
June 9, 2011	Toronto	Canada	Air Canada Centre	Jordin Sparks; Neverest	30,562 / 30,562	$2,268,740
June 11, 2011	Boston	United States	Fenway Park	Jordin Sparks	33,588 / 33,588	$2,441,325
June 12, 2011	East Rutherford	United States	MetLife Stadium	Jordin Sparks; Ashlyne Huff	161,810 / 161,810	$16,558,705
June 13, 2011	East Rutherford	United States	MetLife Stadium	Jordin Sparks; Ashlyne Huff	161,810 / 161,810	$16,558,705
June 15, 2011	Pittsburgh	United States	Heinz Field	Jordin Sparks; Ashlyne Huff	55,823 / 55,823	$5,050,678
June 16, 2011	Auburn Hills	United States	The Palace of Auburn Hills	Jordin Sparks; Ashlyne Huff	13,726 / 13,726	$889,033
June 17, 2011	Chicago	United States	United Center	Jordin Sparks; Ashlyne Huff	135,872 / 135,872	$13,860,350
June 18, 2011	Chicago	United States	United Center	Jordin Sparks; Ashlyne Huff	135,872 / 135,872	$13,860,350
June 20, 2011	Memphis	United States	FedExForum	Ashlyne Huff	—N/a	—N/a
June 21, 2011	Nashville	United States	Bridgestone Arena	Jordin Sparks; Ashlyne Huff	10,580 / 13,793	$777,680
June 22, 2011	Atlanta	United States	Philips Arena	Jordin Sparks; Ashlyne Huff	12,495 / 12,495	$902,678
June 24, 2011	Lafayette	United States	Cajundome	Jordin Sparks; Ashlyne Huff	8,640 / 9,513	$490,993
June 25, 2011	Houston	United States	Toyota Center	Jordin Sparks; Ashlyne Huff	12,742 / 12,742	$908,642
June 26, 2011	Dallas	United States	American Airlines Center	Jordin Sparks; Ashlyne Huff	12,524 / 15,006	$850,734
June 28, 2011	San Antonio	United States	AT&T Center	Jordin Sparks; Ashlyne Huff	8,348 / 13,045	$528,336
June 30, 2011	Phoenix	United States	Talking Stick Resort Arena	Jordin Sparks; Ashlyne Huff	9,803 / 12,326	$455,413
July 1, 2011	Los Angeles	United States	Staples Center	Jordin Sparks; Ashlyne Huff	14,404 / 14,404	$1,078,013
July 2, 2011	San Jose	United States	HP Pavilion	Ashlyne Huff	12,051 / 12,051	$862,140
July 3, 2011	Las Vegas	United States	Mandalay Bay Events Center	Midnight Red	7,419 / 8,800	$615,280
July 6, 2011	Anaheim	United States	Honda Center	Matthew Morrison	10,169 / 11,347	$614,845
July 8, 2011	Tacoma	United States	Tacoma Dome	Matthew Morrison	10,813 / 11,035	$634,435
July 9, 2011	Vancouver	Canada	Rogers Arena	Matthew Morrison	19,796 / 19,796	$1,306,300
July 10, 2011	Vancouver	Canada	Rogers Arena	Matthew Morrison	19,796 / 19,796	$1,306,300
July 12, 2011	Edmonton	Canada	Rexall Place	Matthew Morrison	9,628 / 13,707	$701,153
July 13, 2011^{[A]}	Calgary	Canada	Scotiabank Saddledome	Matthew Morrison	8,810 / 12,395	$851,810
July 15, 2011	Minneapolis	United States	Target Center	Matthew Morrison	12,762 / 12,762	$939,651
July 16, 2011	Kansas City	United States	Sprint Center	Matthew Morrison	11,294 / 11,294	$725,174
July 17, 2011	Tulsa	United States	BOK Center	Matthew Morrison	7,552 / 7,552	$521,215
July 19, 2011	St. Louis	United States	Busch Stadium	Matthew Morrison	48,428 / 48,428	$4,711,277
July 20, 2011	Louisville	United States	KFC Yum! Center	Matthew Morrison	12,894 / 17,504	$761,063
July 22, 2011	Orlando	United States	Amway Center	Matthew Morrison	12,019 / 14,449	$834,170
July 23, 2011	Greensboro	United States	Greensboro Coliseum	Matthew Morrison	11,755 / 14,867	$722,088
July 24, 2011	Columbus	United States	Value City Arena	Matthew Morrison	11,136 / 14,617	$738,246
July 26, 2011	Indianapolis	United States	Conseco Fieldhouse	Matthew Morrison	10,506 / 12,425	$686,739
July 27, 2011	Cleveland	United States	Quicken Loans Arena	Matthew Morrison	11,714 / 18,636	$795,135
July 29, 2011	Atlantic City	United States	Boardwalk Hall	Matthew Morrison	10,847 / 10,847	$744,425
July 30, 2011	Hershey	United States	Hersheypark Stadium	Matthew Morrison	15,138 / 16,252	$687,894
July 31, 2011	Uniondale	United States	Nassau Veterans Memorial Coliseum	Matthew Morrison	12,917 / 12,917	$940,230
August 4, 2011	Ottawa	Canada	Scotiabank Place	Matthew Morrison; Neverest	10,850 / 10,850	$803,718
August 5, 2011	Montreal	Canada	Bell Centre	Matthew Morrison	8,273 / 8,525	$670,340
August 6, 2011	Hamilton	Canada	Copps Coliseum	Matthew Morrison; Neverest	10,574 / 12,478	$630,943
August 7, 2011	London	Canada	John Labatt Centre	Matthew Morrison	7,756 / 8,162	$523,524
Europe
April 20, 2012	Belfast	Northern Ireland	Odyssey Arena	—N/a	—N/a	—N/a
April 21, 2012	Dublin	Ireland	O_{2} Dublin	—N/a	—N/a	—N/a
April 23, 2012	Liverpool	England	Echo Arena Liverpool	—N/a	—N/a	—N/a
April 24, 2012	Manchester	England	Manchester Arena	A Friend in London	7,121 / 8,246	$516,332
April 26, 2012	Newcastle	England	Metro Radio Arena	—N/a	—N/a	—N/a
April 27, 2012	Birmingham	England	LG Arena	—N/a	—N/a	—N/a
April 28, 2012	London	England	The O_{2} Arena	—N/a	24,694 / 29,914	$1,746,440
April 29, 2012	London	England	The O_{2} Arena	—N/a	24,694 / 29,914	$1,746,440
May 1, 2012	Rotterdam	Netherlands	Sportpaleis van Ahoy	—N/a	—N/a	—N/a
May 2, 2012	Antwerp	Belgium	Sportpaleis	A Friend in London	9,078 / 12,690	$534,164
May 3, 2012	Geneva	Switzerland	SEG Geneva Arena	—N/a	—N/a	—N/a
May 5, 2012	Stuttgart	Germany	Hanns-Martin-Schleyer-Halle	—N/a	—N/a	—N/a
May 6, 2012	Leipzig	Germany	Arena Leipzig	Neverest	—N/a	—N/a
May 7, 2012	Berlin	Germany	O_{2} World Berlin	—N/a	13,492 / 13,492	$645,649
May 9, 2012	Hamburg	Germany	O_{2} World Hamburg	—N/a	4,409 / 4,409	$483,906
May 10, 2012	Oberhausen	Germany	König Pilsener Arena	—N/a	—N/a	—N/a
May 12, 2012	Herning	Denmark	Jyske Bank Boxen	—N/a	—N/a	—N/a
May 13, 2012	Malmö	Sweden	Malmö Arena	—N/a	—N/a	—N/a
May 14, 2012	Oslo	Norway	Oslo Spektrum	—N/a	—N/a	—N/a
Australia
May 18, 2012	Melbourne	Australia	Rod Laver Arena	Johnny Ruffo	17,168 / 22,334	$2,046,140
May 19, 2012	Melbourne	Australia	Rod Laver Arena	Johnny Ruffo	17,168 / 22,334	$2,046,140
May 21, 2012	Adelaide	Australia	Adelaide Entertainment Centre	—N/a	—N/a	—N/a
May 23, 2012	Brisbane	Australia	Brisbane Entertainment Centre	—N/a	—N/a	—N/a
May 26, 2012	Sydney	Australia	Allphones Arena	—N/a	—N/a	—N/a
May 29, 2012	Perth	Australia	Burswood Dome	—N/a	—N/a	—N/a
Asia
June 1, 2012	Jakarta	Indonesia	MEIS Ancol	—N/a	—N/a	—N/a
June 3, 2012	Pasay	Philippines	Mall of Asia Arena	—N/a	—N/a	—N/a
TOTAL					1,026,797 / 1,048,547 (97%)	$78,578,328

Festivals and other miscellaneous performances
^{A} This concert is a part of the Calgary Stampede
