= NKOTBSB (disambiguation) =

NKOTBSB is a supergroup consisting of two American boy bands, New Kids on the Block and Backstreet Boys.

NKOTBSB may also refer to:

- NKOTBSB (album)
- NKOTBSB Tour
