= Jonathan Knight =

American pop singer (born 1968)

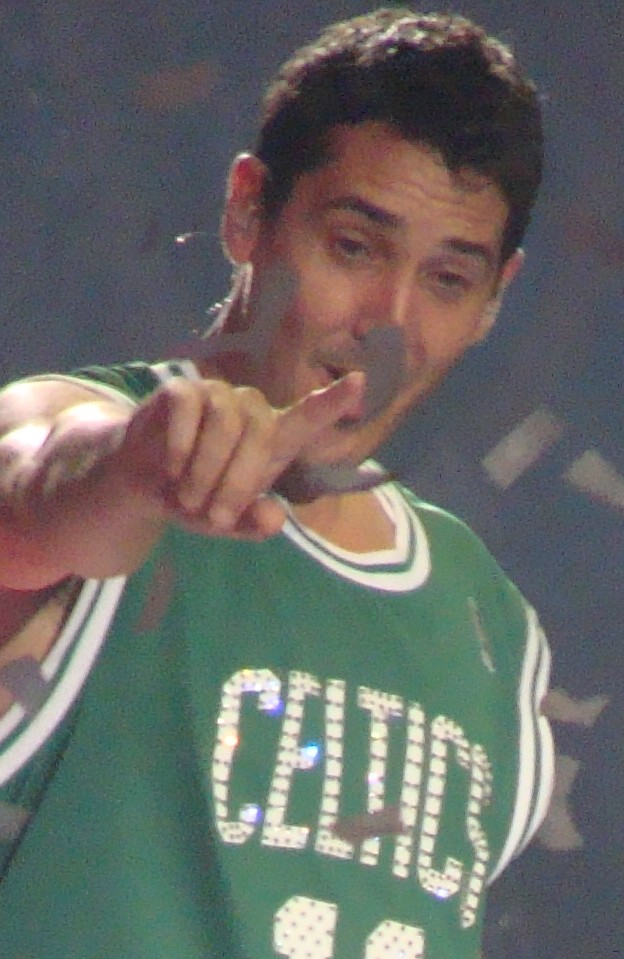
- Knight in 2011

Background information
- Born: Jonathan Rashleigh Knight; November 29, 1968 (age 57)
- Origin: Boston, Massachusetts, U.S.
- Genre: Pop
- Occupations: Singer
- Years active: 1984–1994, 2008–present
- Labels: Columbia (1984–1994); Interscope (2008–present)
- Member of: New Kids on the Block
- Spouse: Harley Rodriguez (m. 2022)
- Website: www.nkotb.com

Jonathan Rashleigh Knight-Rodriguez (né Knight; born November 29, 1968) is an American-Canadian pop singer. He is best known for being a member of the boy band New Kids on the Block. The band also includes his younger brother Jordan, and members Donnie Wahlberg, Joey McIntyre, and Danny Wood. He is the oldest member of the band and the first to leave it in 1994 prior to their official split.

== Early life ==
Jonathan Rashleigh Knight was born in Boston, Massachusetts, to Canadian parents of English, Scottish and German descent, and holds both US and Canadian citizenship. He is one of six children, including Allison, Sharon, David, Christopher and Jordan. His father Allan Knight, an Episcopal priest, is from Meaford, Ontario, and his mother Marlene (née Putnam) is from Dunnville, Ontario.

== Career ==
=== New Kids on the Block ===
From 1986 until 1994, Knight was a member of the American boy band New Kids on the Block (NKOTB) together with his younger brother Jordan Knight. They went on to sell over 80 million records worldwide before splitting in 1994 after he left during the tour for their 1994 album Face the Music. The group attempted to continue the tour claiming Jonathan had been badly hurt by a horse, but in a press conference a few weeks later, they revealed that they were actually splitting.

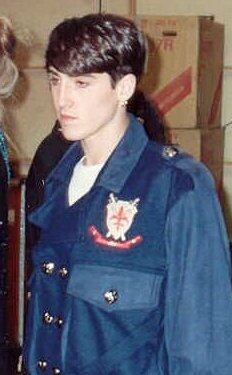
Knight at the 1990 Grammy Awards

In the spring of 2008, Knight returned to show business, reuniting with the other four members of New Kids on the Block. They released their seventh album (and first in 14 years), The Block, on September 2, 2008. To confirm their reunion and announce the new album, they performed live together for the first time in fifteen years on the Today show on May 16, 2008.

A world tour was scheduled to follow the new release and began in Toronto on September 18, 2008. The first single from it, "Summertime", performed well worldwide peaking at No. 9 in Canada and breaking the top 30 in the U.S. charts (#24 as a digital download). They released "Single", their second single from The Block in August 2008.

In March 2024, the group announced that their eighth album, Still Kids, would be released on May 17, 2024. The album is the group's first in eleven years and was preceded by the first single and music video for "Kids" on March 5, 2024. The group, along with opening acts Paula Abdul and DJ Jazzy Jeff, will embark on the NKOTB Magic Summer 2024 Tour in June 2024.

=== Later work ===
In the years after the New Kids first disbanded, Knight worked as a real estate investor living in Essex, Massachusetts.

Knight and Harley Rodriguez participated in the 26th season of the reality competition series The Amazing Race, which aired on CBS in early 2015, where they placed 9th.

In March 2021, Knight began hosting the HGTV television show Farmhouse Fixer, in which he restores old New England farmhouses for clients. The series had more than 15 million viewers in the first two seasons. Season three of the show featuring Knight and interior designer Kristina Crestin premiered on April 23, 2024. The show was cancelled in 2025. In 2026 he hosted the reboot of HGTV program Crashers for 13 episodes.

== Personal life ==
Knight was in a brief relationship with singer Tiffany Darwish from 1989 to 1990.

In 2009, the National Enquirer published an article from his ex-boyfriend Kyle Wilker, who outed him as gay without his consent. Knight said, "I have lived my life very openly and have never hidden the fact that I am gay." In a statement on the New Kids on the Block blog, he added, "Apparently the prerequisite to being a gay public figure is to appear on the cover of a magazine with the caption 'I am gay'. I apologize for not doing so if this is what was expected!"

Since 2008, Knight has been in a relationship with actor and personal trainer Harley Rodriguez, best known for playing Manny Lopez in the Sweet Valley High television series. On November 15, 2016, while vacationing in Africa, the two became engaged when Knight proposed to Rodriguez. In an August 2022 interview with Entertainment Tonight, Knight revealed that he and Rodriguez had married. In 2023, Knight revealed on Lance Bass' podcast that he and Rodriguez had tried, unsuccessfully, to have children for several years saying: "We went through the journey for about five years, and it just didn't happen for us." Knight also took 'Rodriguez' as an additional surname after marrying Rodriguez.

=== Anxiety disorder ===
After leaving New Kids on the Block and no longer in the spotlight, Knight rarely made public appearances or gave interviews. In 2000, he revealed that he suffered from generalized anxiety disorder since his early career with New Kids on the Block. He has since sought medical help and his health has improved. In 2011, he appeared on MTV reality series True Life to help a fan suffering from panic disorder.

== Discography ==
New Kids on the Block albums

- New Kids on the Block (1986)
- Hangin' Tough (1988)
- Step by Step (1990)
- Face the Music (1994)
- The Block (2008)
- 10 (2013)
- Thankful (2017)
- Still Kids (2024)
