= Kia Center =

Arena in Orlando, Florida, United States

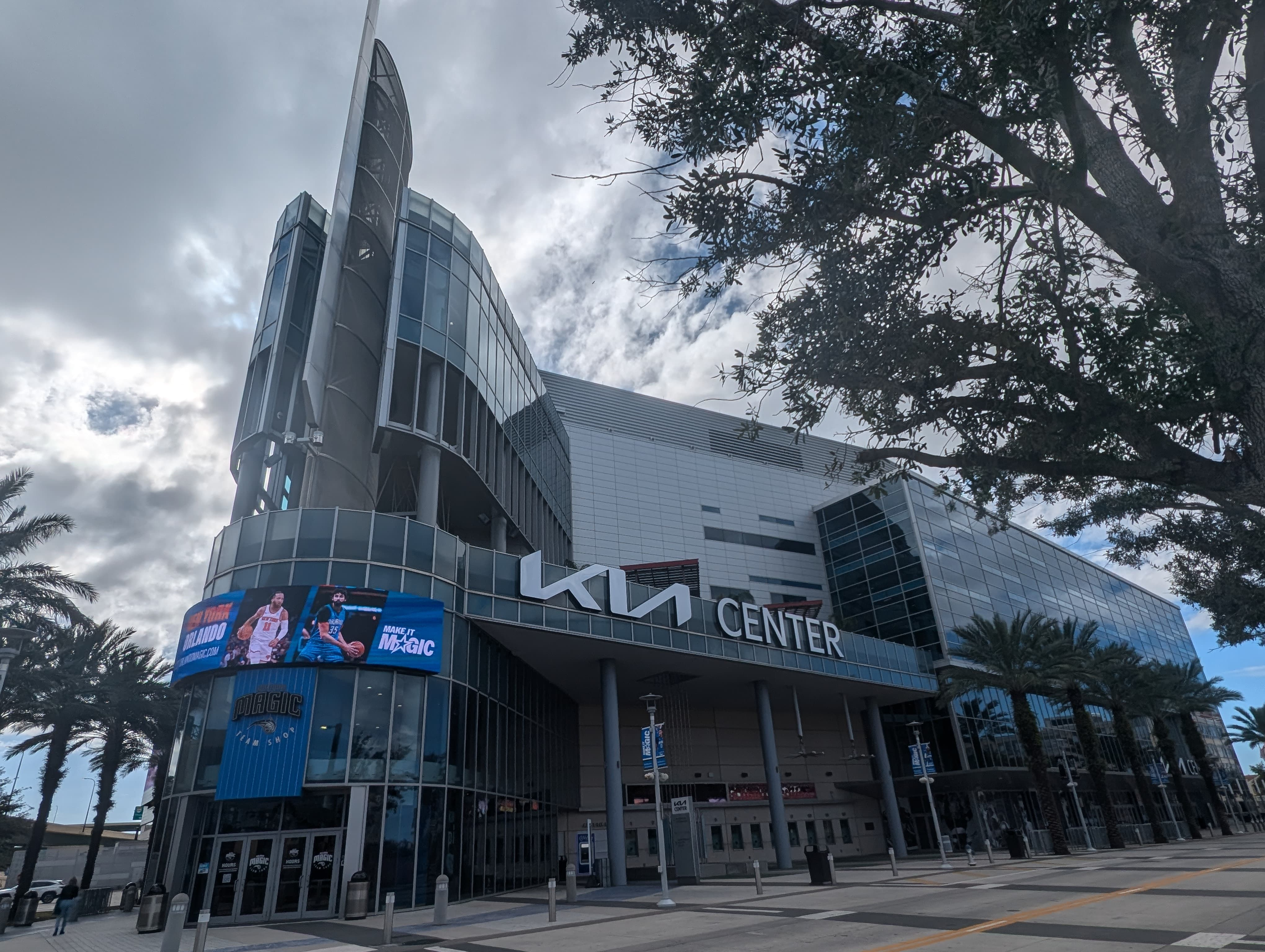
- The main entrance to the arena in 2024

- Location in Florida Location in the United States
- Former names: Orlando Events Center (planning/construction); Amway Center (2010–2023)
- Address: 400 West Church Street
- Location: Orlando, Florida, U.S.
- Coordinates: 28°32′21″N 81°23′1″W
- Owner: City of Orlando
- Operator: Orlando Venues
- Capacity: 18,846 (NBA); 17,030 (center stage concert); 16,486 (end stage concert); 20,000 (NCAA basketball); 17,192 (arena football); 17,353 (ice hockey)
- Public transit: Church Street Station 20, 36, 40 Grapefruit Line

Construction
- Groundbreaking: July 25, 2008
- Opened: October 1, 2010
- Cost: US$480 million (US$718 million in 2025 dollars)
- Architects: Populous (formerly HOK Sport); Chand Tarneja Windows; C.T. Hsu + Associates; Baker Barrios Architects, Inc.
- Project manager: Turner Construction
- Structural engineer: Walter P Moore
- Services engineers: Smith Seckman Reid, Inc.
- General contractors: Hunt Construction; Rey Group; R.L. Burns; HZ Construction; Albu & Associates

Tenants
- Orlando Magic (NBA) (2010–present); Orlando Predators (AFL) (2011–2013, 2015–2016); Orlando Solar Bears (ECHL) (2012–present); Orlando Predators (NAL/AFL) (2019–2024); Orlando Pirates (IFL) (2026–present)

Website
- kiacenter.com

Kia Center (formerly Amway Center) is a multi-purpose indoor arena located in the downtown core of Orlando, Florida. The arena is home to the Orlando Magic of the National Basketball Association (NBA), the Orlando Solar Bears of the ECHL, and formerly the home of the Orlando Predators of the National Arena League and Arena Football League (2024).

In 2012, while operating under the name Amway Center, the facility hosted the 2012 NBA All-Star Game and the 2015 ECHL All-Star Game. It also hosted some games of the round of 64 and round of 32 of the NCAA Division I Men's Basketball Tournament in 2014 and 2017 and 2023. On January 14, 2013, the Arena Football League's Board of Directors voted to award ArenaBowl XXVI to Orlando in the summer of 2013.

The arena has also hosted several local graduations, as well as professional wrestling events by the professional wrestling promotion WWE, notably the 2016 Royal Rumble pay-per-view. Due to the COVID-19 pandemic, the promotion took a long-term residency at the Kia Center from August 21 to December 7, 2020. During this residency, WWE aired its shows from a behind-closed-doors set called the WWE ThunderDome. The promotion relocated to Tropicana Field in St. Petersburg, Florida due to the start of the 2020–21 ECHL and NBA seasons.

== History ==
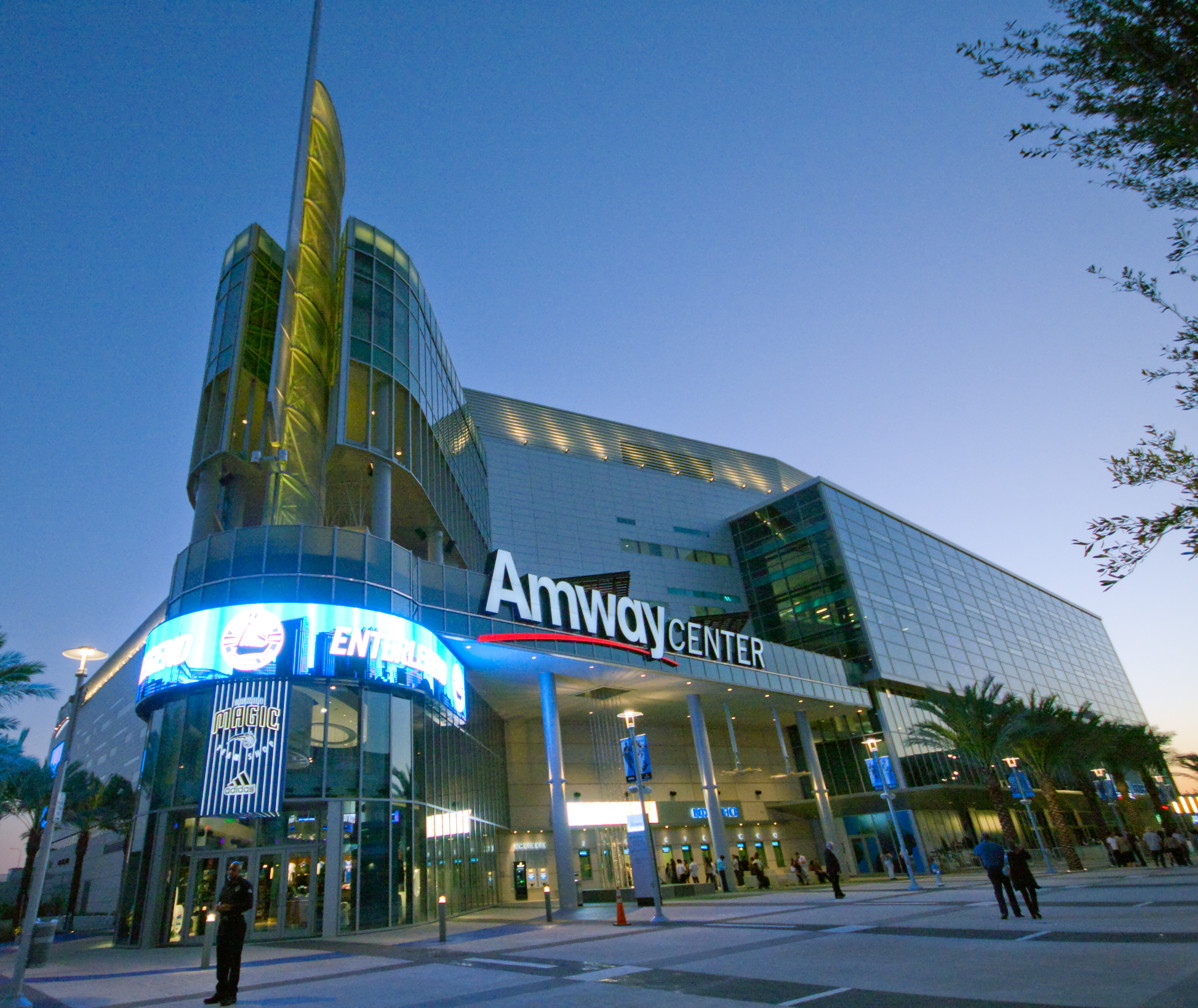
The then-named Amway Center in 2010.

Prior to Downtown Master Plan 3, the Orlando Magic's ownership, led by billionaire Amway founder Richard DeVos and son-in-law Bob Vander Weide, had been pressing the City of Orlando for a new arena for nearly ten years. Amway Arena was built in 1989, prior to the recent era of technologically advanced entertainment arenas. With the rush to build new venues in the NBA (and sports in general), it quickly became one of the oldest arenas in the league.

On September 29, 2006, after years of on-and-off negotiations, Orlando Mayor Buddy Dyer, Orange County Mayor Richard Crotty, and the Orlando Magic announced an agreement on a new arena in downtown Orlando, located at the southwest corner of Church Street and Hughey Avenue. The arena itself cost around $380 million, with an additional $100 million for land and infrastructure, for a total cost of $480 million (as of March 8, 2011, the arena was expected to be within $10 million of the estimated cost). It is part of a $1.05-billion plan to redo the Orlando Centroplex with a new arena, a new $375-million performing arts center, and a $175-million expansion of the Citrus Bowl. When it was announced in the media on September 29, it was referred to as the "Triple Crown for Downtown".

As part of Amway's naming rights to the old Amway Arena, the company received right of first refusal for naming rights to the new venue, and exercised those rights, announcing a $40-million naming deal to name the venue the Amway Center on August 3, 2009.

On December 20, 2023, Amway Center was renamed the Kia Center in partnership with Kia America.

=== Financing ===
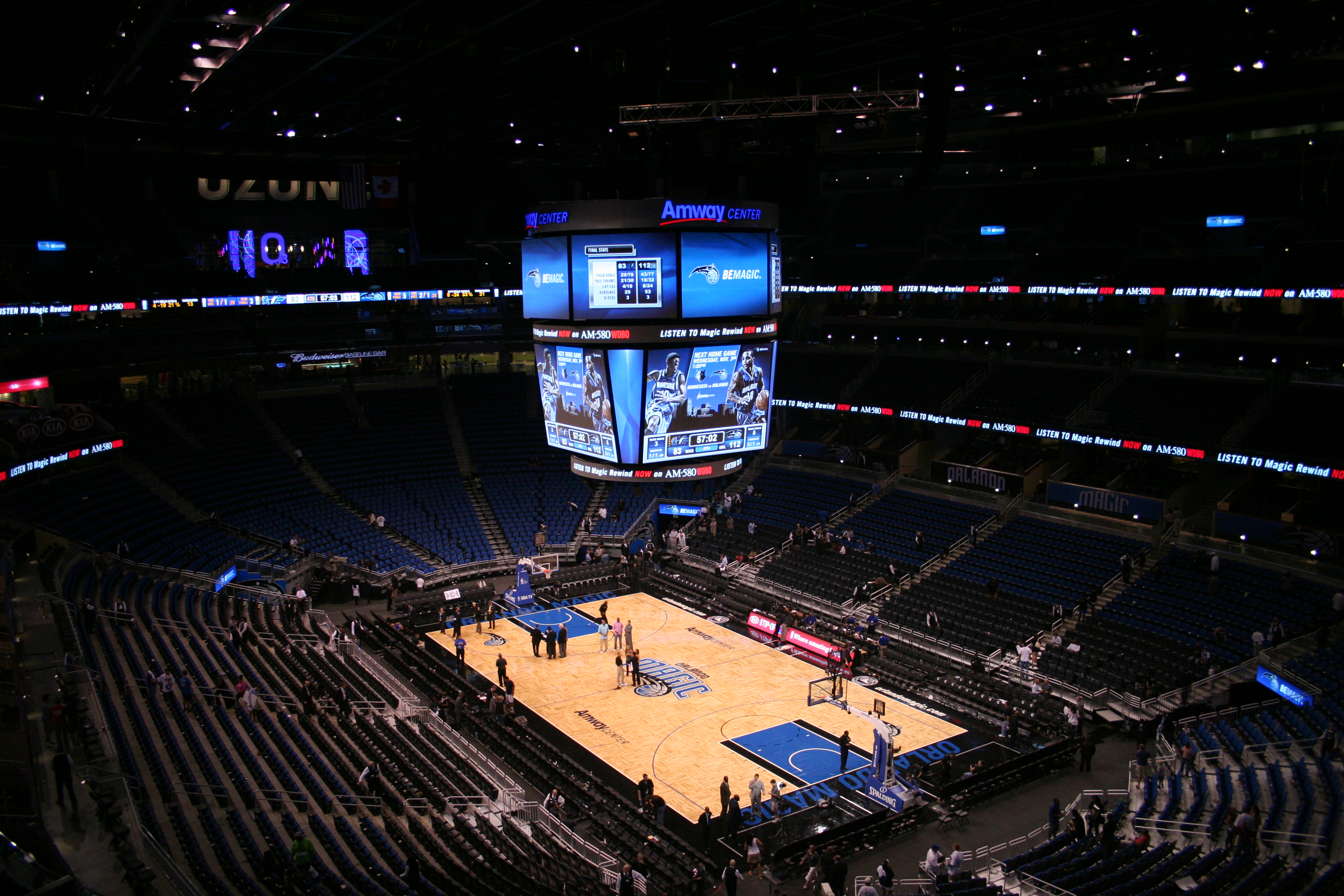
Kia Center in its basketball-venue arrangement after hosting its first NBA regular season game

The details of the agreement were finalized on December 22, 2006. In the agreement, the City of Orlando will take ownership of the new arena, while the Magic will control the planning and construction of the facility so long as contracting procedures are done in the same public manner as governments advertise contracts. In addition, the city will be paid a part of naming rights and corporate suite sales, a share estimated to be worth $1.75 million the first year of the arena's opening. The Magic will receive all proceeds from ticket sales for Magic games, while the city will receive all proceeds from ticket sales to all other events. The Orlando Magic will contribute at least $50 million in cash up-front, pick up any cost overruns, and pay rent of $1 million per year for 30 years. The City of Orlando will pay for the land and infrastructure. The remaining money will come from bonds which will be paid off by part of the Orange County Tourist Development Tax, collected as a surcharge on hotel stays, which was raised to 6% in 2006. The Magic will guarantee $100 million of these bonds.

The Orlando City Council approved several operating agreements connected with the arena plans on May 22, 2007. The City Council approved the plan officially, 6–1, on July 23. The Venue plan received final approval by the Orange County Board of County Commissioners, 5–2, in late evening of July 26 after a long day of public hearings. Amendments were made by the County Commission which were approved on August 6 by the City Council, 6–1, sealing the deal once and for all. On December 1, 2007, the City and the Magic came to an agreement on nearly $8.5 million in compensation to three owners of the land where the arena is planned to be built. An eminent domain hearing confirmed the agreement and finalized the sale.

== Design ==
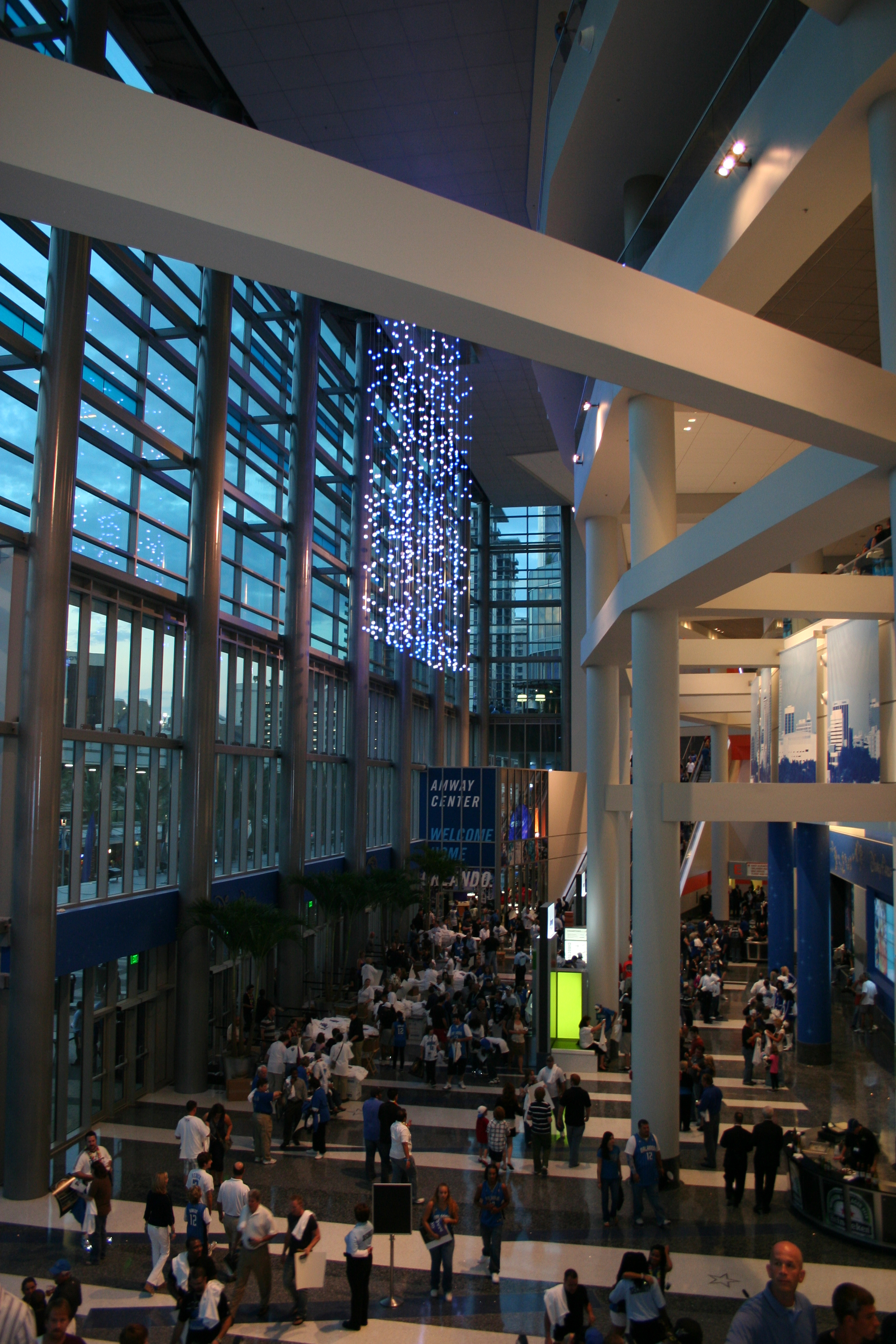
Kia Center main entrance at the opening game of 2010–11 regular season Orlando Magic

Populous (formerly HOK Sport) was named the Architect of Record on August 3, 2007, with Smith Seckman Reid and Walter P Moore Engineers and Consultants as planning partners.

California-based art curator Sports and the Arts assembled the Amway Center Art Collection. The collection includes more than 340 works of art, including about 200 museum-quality photographs. Fourteen of the 21 artists housed in the collection represent Central Florida. The Amway Center Art Collection includes over 140 pieces of fine art paintings and mixed media originals, over 200 photographs, and graphic wall treatments highlighting both the Orlando Magic and the spirit of Orlando and Central Florida.

Responding to a 876,000 ft² program, the design intention of the Amway Events Center was to mediate its disparate context of elevated highways, central business district and low-rise housing. The solidity of the precast and aluminum skin is punctured in carefully considered locations with expansive areas of glass including a crystalline entry lobby facing Church Street, blurring the boundary of inside and outside.

The elevated I-4 freeway bordering the east side of the site posed a distinct challenge, threatening to disconnect the arena both physically and psychologically from the downtown core. In response, the corner of the arena is anchored by a diaphanous feature tower bathed in color changing LED lighting that reveals the color and pageantry of sporting and entertainment activities within while marking the facility within the flat topography of downtown Orlando. This tower is both architectural and occupied – housing the Orlando Magic Team Store, hospitality space, Big Storm Brewing Company – an onsite brewery connected to the atrium, and the "Sky Lounge" or "One 80" rooftop Sky Bar. The latter two are exterior spaces that take full advantage of the warm Orlando climate, commanding views to the plaza below and the greater community beyond. Further city connection is achieved via a 40’ × 60’ LED video feature that addresses downtown from an elevated façade position above the highway.

Kia Center is one of the most technologically advanced venues in the world. Inside the building, a unique centerhung installation, manufactured by Daktronics, is the tallest in any NBA venue. It maximizes creative programming options by using high resolution, 6mm-pixel technology on each of the 18 displays, including two digital ring displays and four tapered corners. Additional displays include approximately 2,100 feet (640 m) of digital ribbon boards, the largest of which is a 360-degree 1,100 feet (340 m) display surrounding the entire seating bowl. These displays have the ability to display exciting motion graphics and real time content, such as in-game statistics, out-of-town scores, and closed captioning information. Outside the building, a large display utilizes more than 5,000 Daktronics ProPixel LED sticks, each a meter long, which make up a 46 feet (14 m) by 53 feet (16 m) video display. This display will reach millions of motorists traveling by the Kia Center on Interstate 4.

=== Comparison to Amway Arena ===
Kia Center has an assortment of mid-level luxury seats and club seating, located below the upper bowl. This contrasts Amway Arena's design as its luxury boxes are above all seats and suspended from the ceiling. The arena's design was unveiled at Amway Arena on December 10, 2007, with an official press release the next day. The floor of Kia Center is designed with arena football in mind, as it features more retractable sections that will permit squared end zone corners, a feature previously not possible for Orlando Predators games.

Arena Comparison
Characteristic	Kia Center	Amway Arena
Capacity Ice hockey Arena football NBA NCAA basketball End stage concert Center stage concert	17,353; 17,192; 18,846; 20,000; 16,486; 17,030	15,948; 15,924; 17,461; 17,283; 12,592; 18,039
Square footage	875,000	367,000
Suites	32 Founders Suites; 28 Presidents Suites; 68 Loge Boxes; 2 Legends Suites (161 seats in each suite); 14 MVP Tables; 4 Silver Suites; 6 IOA Hardwood Suites; 2 All-Star Decks; 1 Southwest Flight Deck; 1 Kia Deck; 3 Club Hospitality Rooms	26 Skyboxes (suspended from ceiling)
Club seats	1,428	0
Concourses	5 concourses, average 35' width	1 concourse, average 20' width
Public restrooms	18 men's, 19 women's	4 men's, 4 women's
Retail stores	3	0 (4 fixed stands)
Concession points of sale	1:150 spectators	1:215 spectators

=== Construction of Kia Center ===
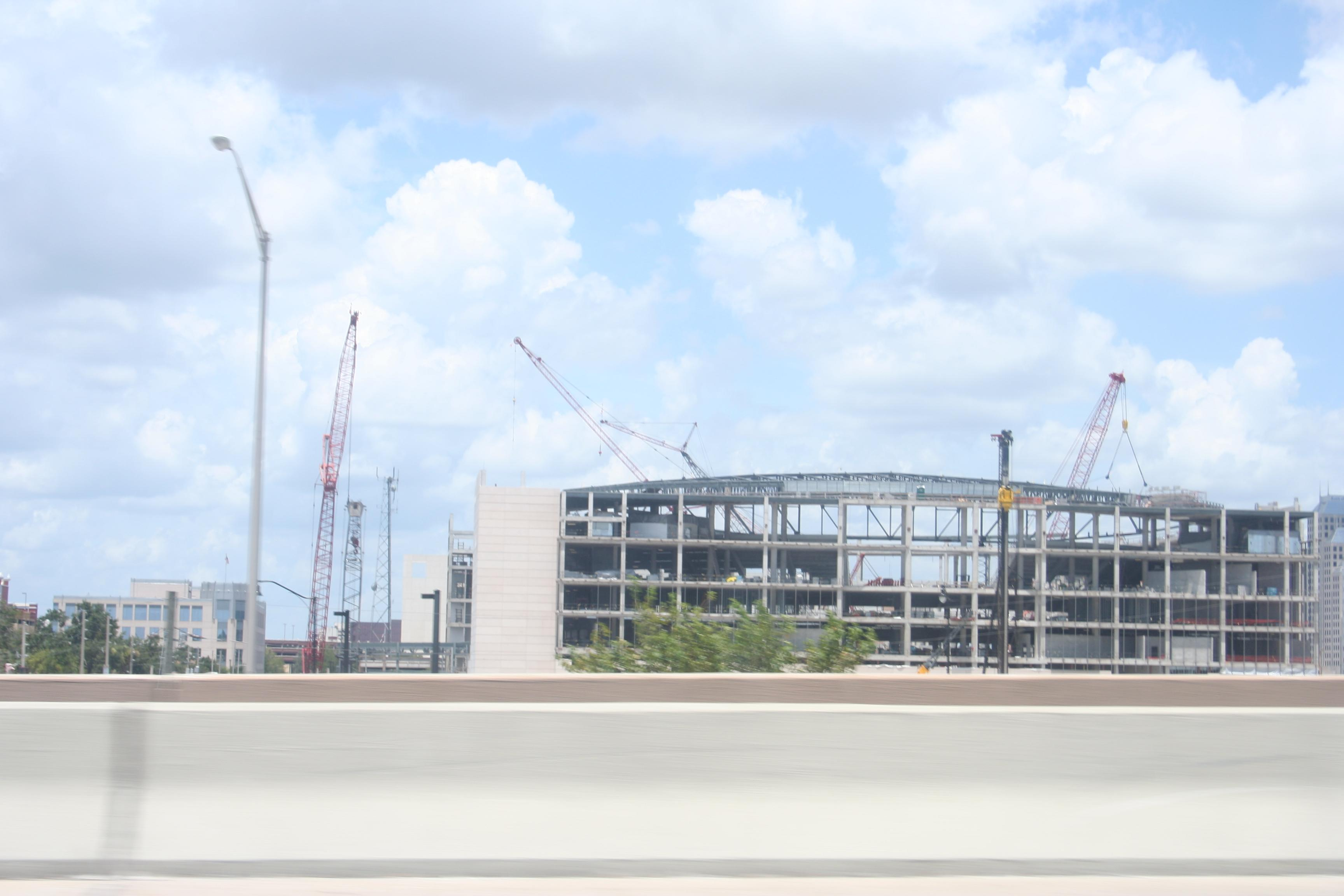
August 2, 2009

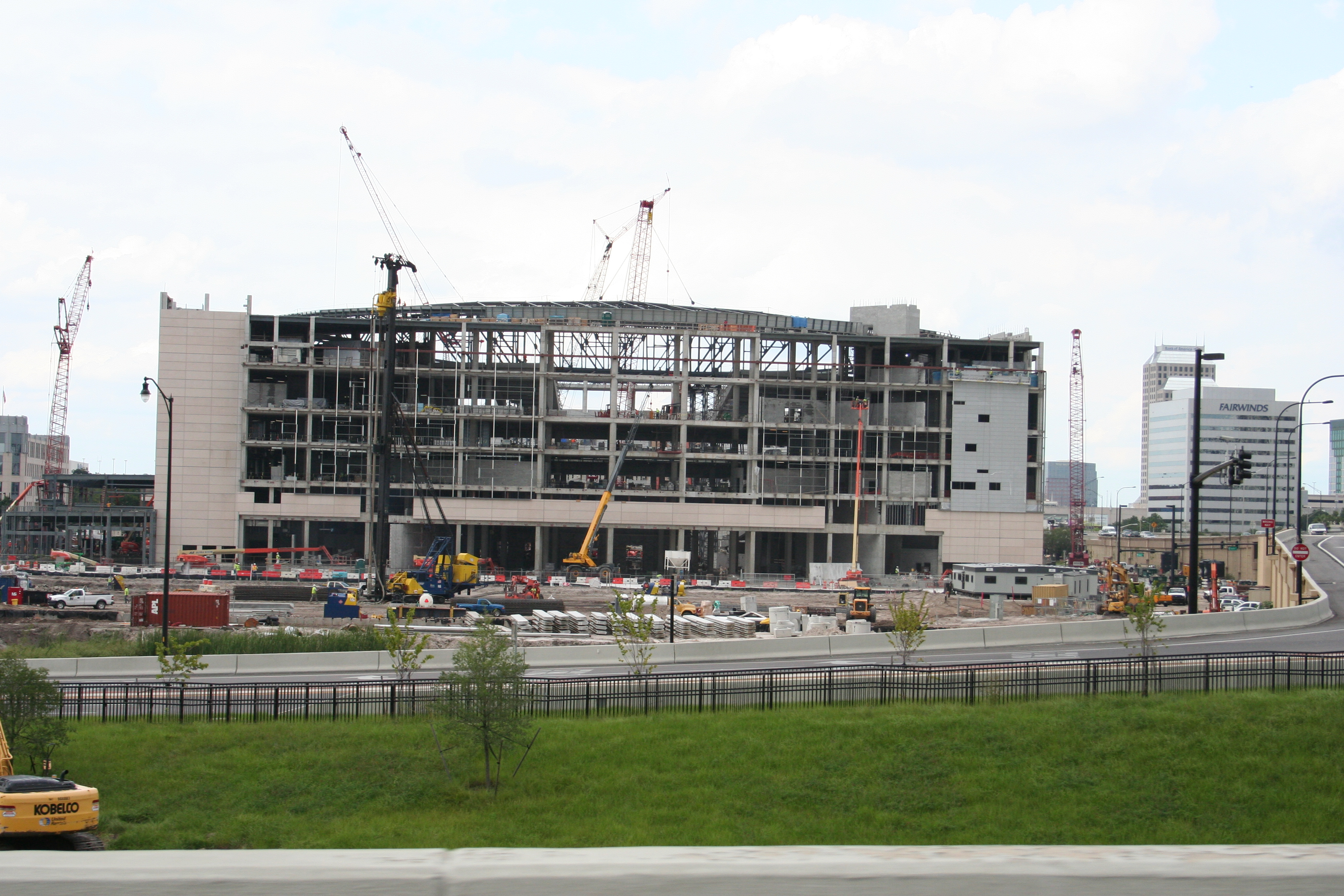
August 24, 2009

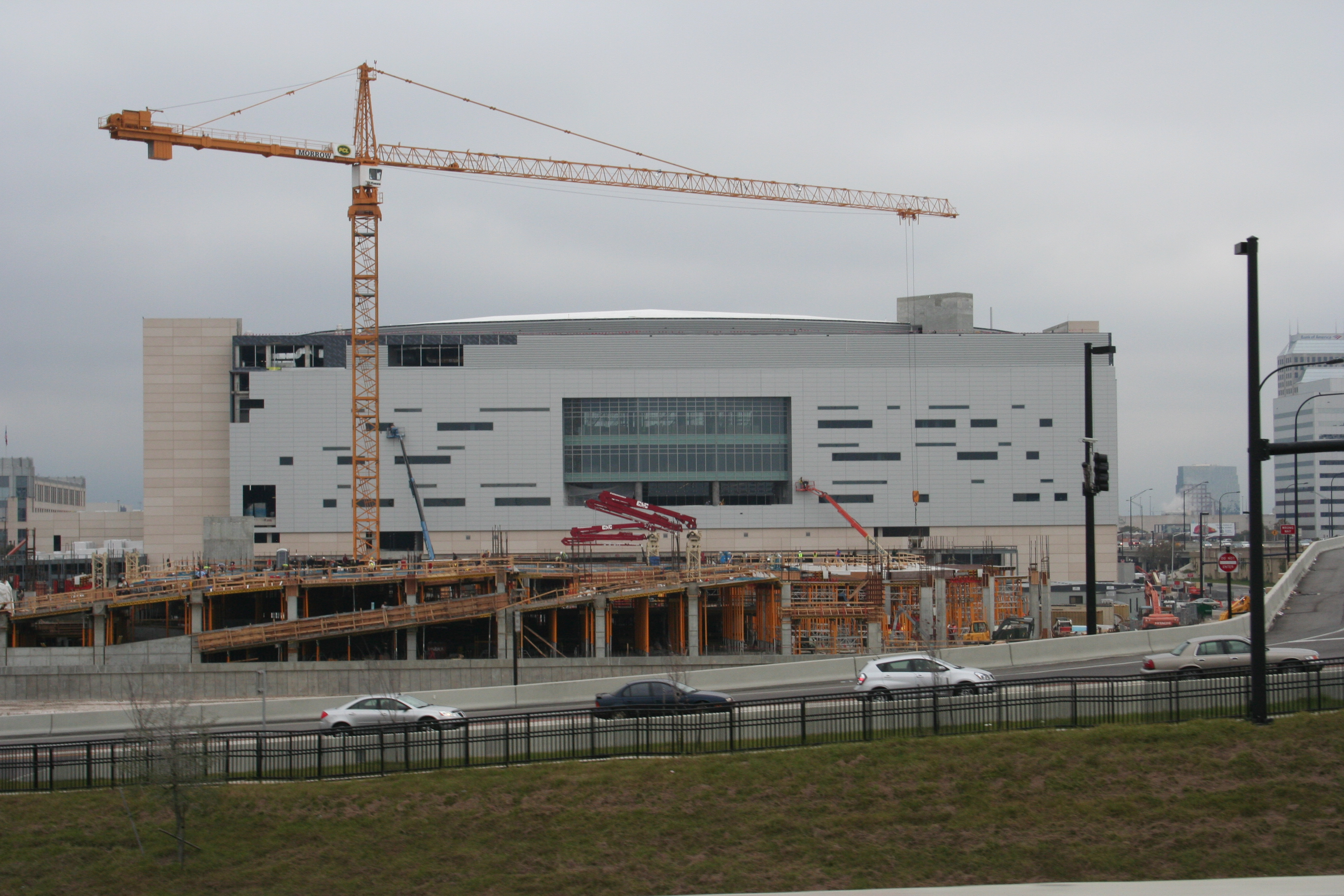
January 8, 2010

Complete Construction Project

== Grand opening ==
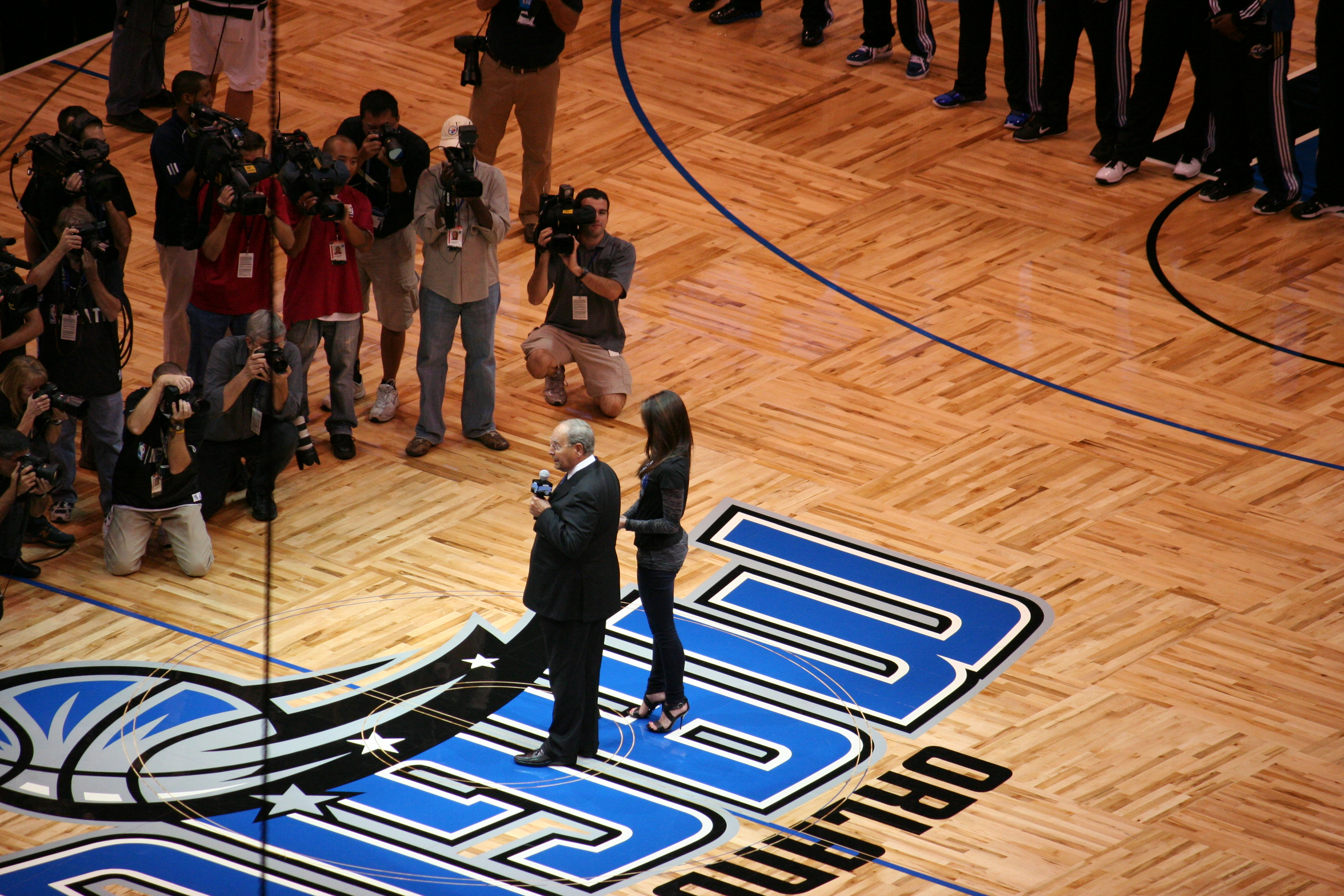
Magic owner Rich DeVos speaking to fans before the first Magic home game in the new arena.

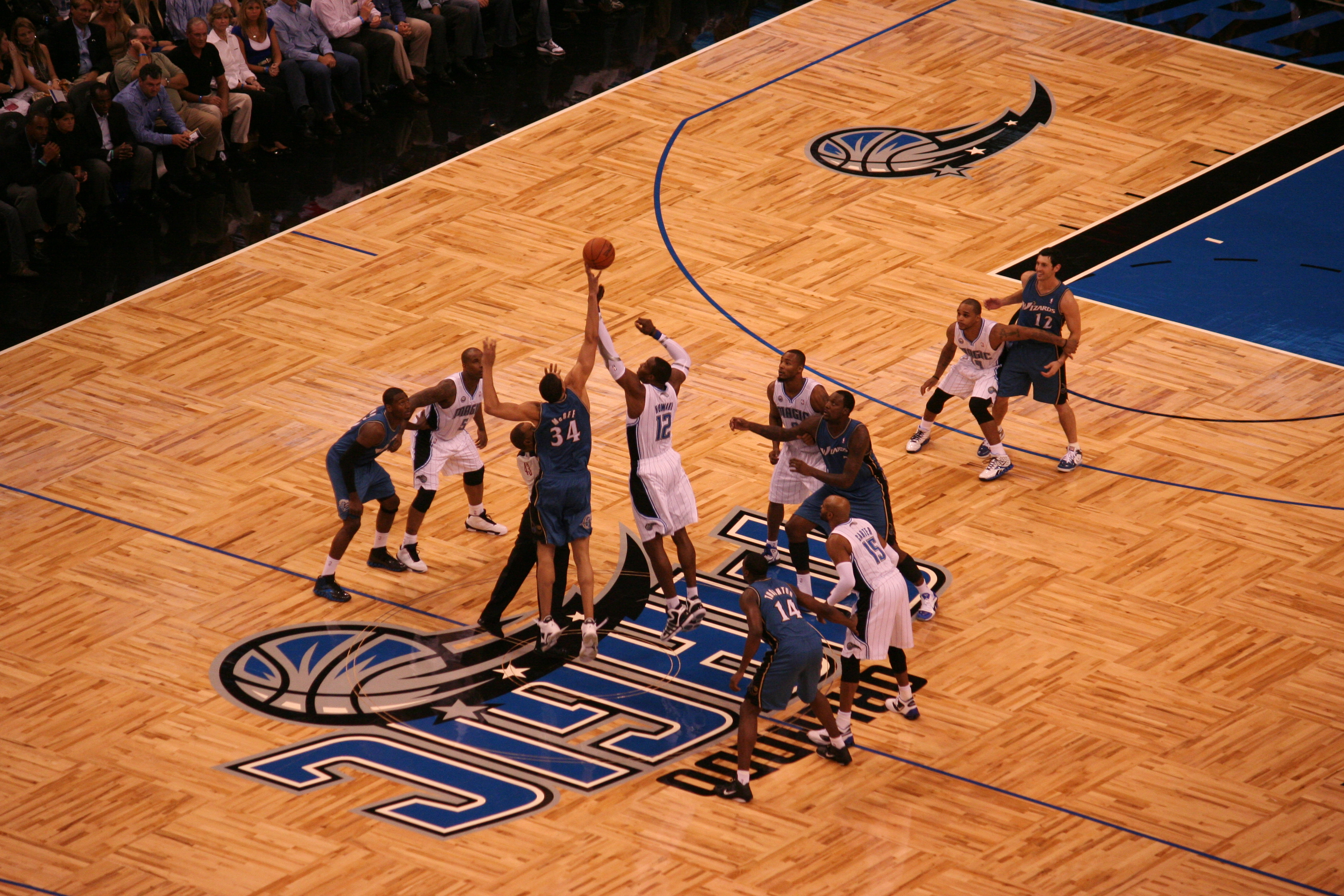
Kia Center's first NBA regular season game tip-off with the Magic hosting the Wizards

The official ribbon cutting ceremony and dedication took place on September 29, 2010, at 10:01 AM. The general public was invited to enter the building where Orlando Mayor Buddy Dyer gave his annual State of Downtown address. The first ticketed event was a Vicente Fernández concert on October 8. The Orlando Magic hosted their first preseason game at Kia Center on October 10 against the New Orleans Hornets when they won by a historic margin of 54 points, while the 2010–11 regular season home opener took place on October 28 against the Washington Wizards, where they won 112–83.

== Concerts and notable events ==
Artist	Date(s)	Special Guests / Notes
Vicente Fernández	October 8, 2010	with Edith Márquez
Eagles	October 26, 2010; November 23, 2013	with JD & the Straight Shot
Chayanne	November 20, 2010	—
Johann Strauss Orchestra	December 11, 2010; March 7, 2013	with Béla Mavrák
Trans-Siberian Orchestra	December 12, 2010; December 11, 2011; December 16, 2012; November 30, 2013; December 14, 2014; December 17, 2022	(2 shows each date)
Gaither Homecoming	December 18, 2010	—
Barry Manilow	January 20, 2011; January 18, 2014	—
Celtic Woman	February 5, 2011	—
Brad Paisley & The Drama Kings	February 24, 2011; January 25, 2014	with Darius Rucker, Jerrod Niemann, Chris Young, Danielle Bradbery
Lil Wayne	April 6, 2011	with Rick Ross, Nicki Minaj, Porcelain Black, Travis Barker, Mix Master Mike
Ricky Martin	April 8, 2011	—
Lady Gaga	April 15, 2011; May 9, 2019	with Semi Precious Weapons
Usher	April 28, 2011; December 12, 2014	with Akon, Dev, The Cataracs, August Alsina, DJ Cassidy
Tim McGraw	May 1, 2011	with Luke Bryan and The Band Perry
Bon Jovi	May 15, 2011	—
Taylor Swift	June 11, 2011; April 11–12, 2013	with NEEDTOBREATHE, Frankie Ballard, Ed Sheeran, Brett Eldredge
WMMO 98.9's Concert Series	June 12; October 8, 2011	—
Rubén Blades	June 17, 2011	with Gilberto Santa Rosa
Maná	July 9, 2011	—
Sade	July 17, 2011	with John Legend
Britney Spears	July 20, 2011	with Nicki Minaj, Nervo, Jessie & The Toy Boys
NKOTBSB	July 22, 2011	NKOTBSB Tour; with Matthew Morrison, Midnight Red
American Idol Live!	July 24, 2011; August 2, 2012; August 1, 2013	—
Marc Anthony	September 18, 2011; August 5, 2012; August 25, 2013; October 5, 2014	with Chayanne, Marco Antonio Solís
Marco Antonio Solís	September 25, 2011	with Ana Gabriel
Sugarland	October 20, 2011	with Sara Bareilles
Enrique Iglesias	October 21, 2011; October 28, 2014; November 14, 2017	with Pitbull, Prince Royce, J Balvin
Guns N' Roses	October 28, 2011	with Buckcherry
Josh Groban	October 29, 2011; November 9, 2013	with Judith Hill
Jason Aldean	January 22, 2012	with Luke Bryan, Lauren Alaina
Jimmy Buffett & The Coral Reefer Band	February 4, 2012	—
George Strait & The Ace in the Hole Band	February 11, 2012	with Martina McBride
Andrea Bocelli	February 12, 2012; February 18, 2024	Valentine's Day Concert (2024)
Michael Jackson: The Immortal	February 28–29, 2012	—
Romeo Santos	March 2, 2012; March 28, 2013; May 30, 2014; March 13, 2018	—
Elton John	March 10, 2012; March 7, 2015	—
Red Hot Chili Peppers	March 31, 2012; April 26, 2017	with Santigold, Babymetal, Jack Irons
Van Halen	April 14, 2012	with Kool & the Gang
Tom Petty and the Heartbreakers	May 3, 2012	with Regina Spektor
Nickelback	May 4, 2012	with Bush, Seether, My Darkest Days
Roger Waters	June 16, 2012	with The Bleeding Heart Band
LMFAO	June 23, 2012	with Far East Movement, Sidney Samson, Natalia Kills
One Direction	June 30, 2012	with Olly Murs, Manika
Rod Stewart	August 3, 2012	with Stevie Nicks
The Who	November 3, 2012	with Vintage Trouble
Carrie Underwood	December 21, 2012	with Hunter Hayes
Justin Bieber	January 25, 2013	with Carly Rae Jepsen, Cody Simpson
Luke Bryan	January 26, 2013; February 19 & 21, 2015	with Thompson Square, Florida Georgia Line, Randy Houser, Dustin Lynch
P!nk	February 24, 2013	with The Hives
Muse	February 25, 2013	with Dead Sara
Three Days Grace	March 9, 2013	with Shinedown, P.O.D.
Maroon 5	March 30, 2013; September 9, 2016	with Neon Trees, Owl City, Tove Lo, R. City
Rush	April 28, 2013	—
Paul McCartney	May 18–19, 2013	—
New Kids on the Block	June 21, 2013; June 5, 2015; July 10, 2022; July 13, 2019	with Boyz II Men, 98 Degrees, TLC, Nelly, Salt N Pepa, En Vogue, Rick Astley, Debbie Gibson, Tiffany, Naughty By Nature
Bruce Springsteen and the E Street Band	February 5, 2023	—
Fall Out Boy	March 15, 2024	Jimmy Eat World, Hot Mulligan, Games We Play; So Much For (Tour) Dust
blink-182	June 20, 2024	Pierce the Veil, jdxn; ONE MORE TIME... Tour
Charli XCX & Troye Sivan	October 6, 2024	Sweat
Deftones	March 20, 2025	The Mars Volta, Fleshwater
Billie Eilish	March 10, 2020; October 14, 2025	with Jessie Reyez; Hit Me Hard and Soft: The Tour
Twice	March 27–28, 2026	This Is For World Tour

Florida musicians who have performed at the Kia Center include Shinedown in 2010, NKOTBSB (with Orlando's Backstreet Boys) in '11, Rick Ross in '11, the late Jimmy Buffett in '12, the late Tom Petty in '12, Pitbull in '12 at the NBA All-Star Game, Enrique Iglesias in '17, Florida Georgia Line in '17, and Ariana Grande in '15, '17, and '19, Backstreet Boys again in '19, and Luis Fonsi in '21.

=== Professional wrestling ===
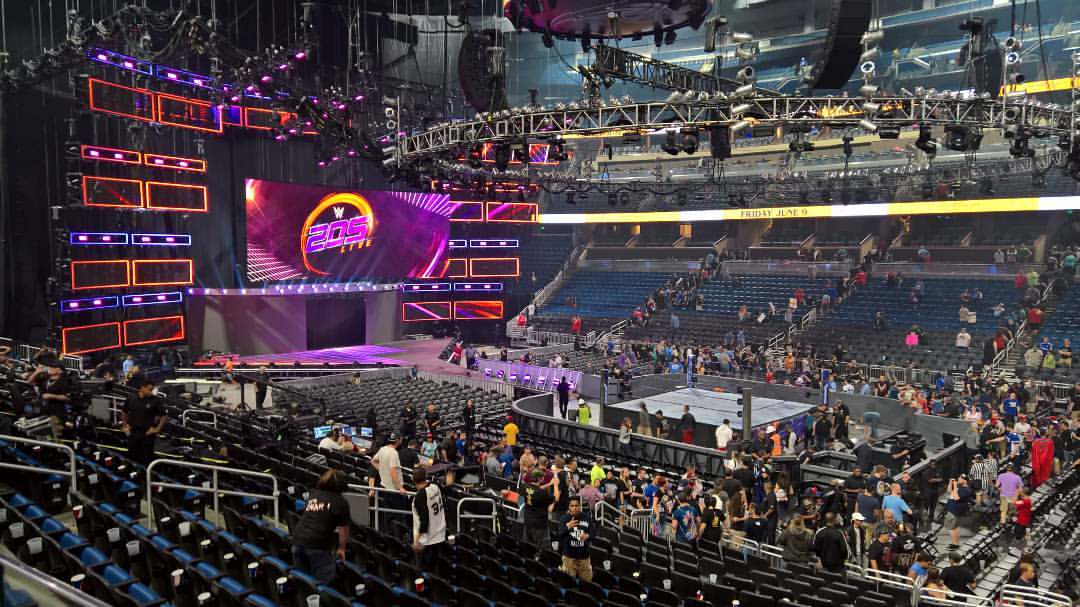
Kia Center during the April 4, 2017, broadcast of WWE 205 Live.

On January 24, 2016, WWE hosted its pay-per-view event Royal Rumble at the Kia Center.

From April 1 to 4, 2017, Kia Center hosted multiple WWE shows as part of the festivities for WrestleMania 33 at Camping World Stadium, including NXT TakeOver: Orlando on the Saturday before the event, and the post-WrestleMania editions of Raw and SmackDown.

From August 21 to December 7, 2020, WWE produced Raw, SmackDown, and their associated pay-per-views at the arena as part of a bio-secure bubble called the WWE ThunderDome. The programs and events had been broadcast from the WWE Performance Center in Orlando since mid-March due to the COVID-19 pandemic in the United States; as with the Performance Center broadcasts, these programs were produced behind closed doors with no in-person spectators, but featured a larger-scale in-arena production in comparison to the Performance Center (promoted as being at a similar caliber to WWE pay-per-views), a virtual audience (similar to the nearby NBA bubble), and other lighting and pyrotechnic effects. Under the arrangement, five pay-per-views were hosted in the arena, including SummerSlam, Payback, Clash of Champions, Hell in a Cell, and Survivor Series. WWE relocated the ThunderDome to Tropicana Field in St. Petersburg on December 11 due to the start of the 2020–21 ECHL and NBA seasons. WWE returned to Kia Center for the first time since the ThunderDome for the August 9, 2021 Raw.

=== Mixed martial arts ===
It hosted UFC on Fox: Werdum vs. Browne on April 19, 2014, UFC on Fox: dos Anjos vs. Cowboy 2 on December 19, 2015, UFC on Fox: Emmett vs. Stephens on February 24, 2018 and UFC on ESPN: Thompson vs. Holland on December 3, 2022.

Events and tenants
Preceded by Amway Arena	Home of the Orlando Magic; 2010–present	Succeeded by
Preceded by Amway Arena	Home of the Orlando Predators; 2011–2013	Succeeded by CFE Arena
Preceded by CFE Arena	Home of the Orlando Predators; 2015–2016	Succeeded by Ceased operations
Preceded by expansion team	Home of the Orlando Predators (NAL); 2019–present	Succeeded by
Preceded by First	Home of the WWE ThunderDome; 2020	Succeeded by Tropicana Field
