= Dirty Dawg =

Single by NKOTB

from the album Face the Music
- Released: December 20, 1993
- Recorded: 1993
- Genre: New jack swing
- Length: 4:12 (album version); 3:34 (album version with no rap); 3:16 (radio edit)
- Label: Columbia
- Songwriters: D. Wahlberg; J. Johnson; J. Knight; J.R. Jackson; Larry Thomas; Nice & Smooth

NKOTB singles chronology
"If You Go Away" (1991)	"Dirty Dawg" (1993)	"Never Let You Go" (1994)

Music video
- "Dirty Dawg" on YouTube

Not to be confused with the cartoon character and one of the titular segments from The Kwicky Koala Show.

"Dirty Dawg" is a song by American boyband NKOTB (formerly New Kids on the Block), which became their final single to chart on the US Billboard Hot 100 until the 2008 single "Summertime". It was featured on their 1994 album Face the Music and released in December 1993, by Columbia Records. The lead vocals were sung by Jordan Knight and Donnie Wahlberg rapped in the song, but he rapped only small bits during the instrumental breaks. There was another rap in the song featured by the former East Coast hip hop duo Nice & Smooth. The song peaked on the Billboard Hot 100 at number 66 and broke the top 40 in the United Kingdom, peaking at number 27. The accompanying music video was directed by Scott Kalvert. "Dirty Dawg" contains a sample of "That's the Way Love Goes", as performed by Janet Jackson.

== Critical reception ==
Upon the single release, Larry Flick from Billboard magazine commented, "Something happened to these "kids" during their three-year break from recording ... they grew into credible vocalists. Smokin' first single from the new Face the Music album shines with solid singing, a red-hot groove, and a tune that sticks to brain upon impact. It may be an uphill battle at radio, though an open mind will hear a track that demands airtime." Pan-European magazine Music & Media wrote, "Besides, of all newcomers during NKTOB's three-year absence, East 17 is the only act with a similarly streetwise attitude. But then again, the first single 'Dirty Dawg' shows up the unbridgable difference between combat zones Walthamstow (London) and the Bronx (NYC). The daily problems are thesame though."

James Hamilton from the Record Mirror Dance Update named it a "moaning funky jack-swing lurcher" in his weekly dance column. Tony Cross from Smash Hits gave the song a score of four out of five, writing, "NKOTB have been as reliable as a fake Rolex recently. But from the moment 'Dirty Dawg' literally barks out of the speakers you'll know they are back. Harder and better than anything else they've done, 'Dirty Dawg' sees the Oldish Kids taking their pop talent, mixing in a dash of Cypress Hill and coming up with a growling groove that East 17's Lecy would be proud of."

== Music video ==
The music video for "Dirty Dawg" was directed by American film director Scott Kalvert. It starts off with a young woman running through the forest with a search dog barking after her. Then the scene switches back and forth from the band attending a party being held at a brothel to a construction site where the group raps and dances. Towards the end, Nice & Smooth appear to give a rap cameo, while the group breakdances.

The music video received a formal warning from the Independent Television Commission, which led to MTV Europe being force to move the video into late-night time slots. The Canadian station MuchMusic banned it from appearing on its schedule, due to the suggested violence and misogynistic themes.

== Track listings ==
- US 12" vinyl
1. "Dirty Dawg" (LP Version) – 4:12
2. "Dirty Dawg" (Radio Version No Rap) – 3:16
3. "Dirty Dawg" (Greg Nice Remix) – 4:46
4. "Dirty Dawg" (Barbosa / Liggett House Mix) – 7:03
5. "Dirty Dawg" (Liggett / Barbosa Hip Hop Mix) – 5:01
- UK limited edition 7" vinyl with poster bag
1. "Dirty Dawg" (LP Version) – 4:12
2. "Dirty Dawg" (Radio Version No Rap) – 3:16

== Charts ==
Chart (1994)	Peak position
Australia (ARIA)	20
Canada Retail Singles (The Record)	3
Europe (Eurochart Hot 100)	46
Europe (European Dance Radio)	5
Europe (European Hit Radio)	35
Finland (Suomen virallinen lista)	14
France Airplay (SNEP)	55
Israel (Israeli Singles Chart)	24
Netherlands (Dutch Top 40 Tipparade)	11
Netherlands (Single Top 100)	41
New Zealand (Recorded Music NZ)	13
Scottish Singles Sales (Official Charts)	60
Spain Airplay (Top 40 Radio)	1
Sweden (Sverigetopplistan)	15
UK Singles (Official Charts)	27
UK Club Chart (Music Week)	66
US Billboard Hot 100	66
US Hot R&B/Hip-Hop Songs (Billboard)	73
US Cash Box Top 100	84
