= Ashlyne Huff =

American singer, songwriter and dancer (born 1985)

- Born: Ashlyne Anderson Huff; August 28, 1985 (age 41); Glendale, California, U.S.
- Genres: Pop; rock
- Occupations: Singer; songwriter; dancer
- Instruments: Vocals; guitar
- Years active: 2007–present
- Label: Liquid Digital Media

Ashlyne Anderson Huff (born August 28, 1985) is an American singer, songwriter and dancer. She is the daughter of Nashville record producer and session-guitarist Dann Huff, the granddaughter of Nashville arranger Ron Huff and the niece of Giant and White Heart drummer David Huff.

== Early life ==
As a child Huff took dance lessons and musical classes. Huff won an award at the Actors, Models and Talent for Christ (AMTC) 2004 Winter Convention in the category 'Overall Dancer'. She then headed to the Belmont University and enrolled in the Belmont University Music Business program where she studied publishing and copyright law. During her studies at the university Huff continued working on her own music. Huff is a graduate of Belmont University.

== Career ==
She was the opening act alongside Just Kait for Honor Society on their Spring 2010 Here Comes Trouble Tour. She has also toured with Emily Osment.

Her self-titled album was released May 11, 2010 by Liquid Digital Media. She wrote or co-wrote every song on the album. She was the featured performer at Liquid's awards dinner on May 17, 2010.

Her song "Heart of Gold" is offered as a bonus track with the compilation album Now That's What I Call Music! featuring Daughtry, Kris Allen and Adam Lambert.

In the summer of 2010, she embarked on selected dates of Jordin Sparks' "Battlefield Tour" as opening act alongside Days Difference.

The following summer, in 2011, Ashlyne joined the New Kids on the Block and the Backstreet Boys as an opening act on the NKOTBSB Tour.

In 2015 she published the book Falling Stars.

In 2025, she began a podcast editing and production company called Small Batch Sound. https://www.smallbatchsound.com

Ashlyne and her husband Marcus Blue went through IVF for their son Archer, who was born in 2024. Through her experience, she realized fertility was a subject that was really not all that talked about until after the fact. Because she was already a podcast editor for other people, she decided to start her own called Confessions of a Slow Cooker in an effort to bring those tough topics out of their silos.https://www.confessionsofaslowcooker.com

== Discography ==
=== Studio albums ===
Title	Album details	Peak chart positions	
Title	Album details	US Heat	US Indie
Ashlyne Huff	Release date: May 22, 2010; Label: Liquid Digital Media; Formats: CD, music download	10	50
Let It Out	Release date: June 7, 2011; Label: Liquid Digital Media; Formats: CD, music download	35	

=== Singles ===
Year	Single	Album
2011	"Whatever" (featuring Eric Bellinger)	Let It Out
