= H.I.T.S. =

Greatest hits album by "NKOTB" (New Kids on the Block)
- Released: December 6, 1991
- Recorded: 1986–1991
- Genre: Pop/R&B
- Length: 66:45
- Label: Columbia/Sony Music
- Producers: Maurice Starr, Walter Afanasieff (track 2)

"NKOTB" (New Kids on the Block) chronology
No More Games/The Remix Album (1991)	H.I.T.S. (1991)	Face the Music (1994)

Singles from H.I.T.S.
- 1. "If You Go Away" Released: December 14, 1991

H.I.T.S. is the first greatest hits album of the New Kids on the Block (NKOTB). It includes one new song titled "If You Go Away" which peaked #16 in U.S. Billboard Hot 100. H.I.T.S. was certified Gold in Spain for the sales of 50,000 units.

== Track listing ==
1. "You Got It (The Right Stuff)" - 4:09
2. "If You Go Away" - 4:00
3. "Step by Step" - 4:27
4. "Cover Girl" - 5:47
5. "Games (The Kids Get Hard Mix)" - 5:21
6. "I'll Be Loving You (Forever)" - 4:22
7. "This One's for the Children" - 3:54
8. "Tonight" - 3:28
9. "Baby, I Believe in You" - 4:39
10. "Didn't I (Blow Your Mind)" - 4:24
11. "Hangin' Tough" - 4:16
12. "Valentine Girl" - 3:57
13. "Please Don't Go Girl" - 4:30
14. "Call It What You Want (The C&C Pump-It Mix)" - 6:31
15. "My Favorite Girl" - 5:28

== Charts ==
Chart (1991–1992)	Peak position
Australian Albums (ARIA)	13
Austrian Albums (Ö3 Austria)	16
Dutch Albums (Album Top 100)	17
European Albums Chart	29
Finnish Albums (Suomen virallinen lista)	10
German Albums (Offizielle Top 100)	26
Greek Albums (IFPI Greece)	18
Japanese Albums (Oricon)	4
New Zealand Albums (RMNZ)	14
Swedish Albums (Sverigetopplistan)	34
Swiss Albums (Schweizer Hitparade)	37
UK Albums (Official Charts)	50

== Certifications and sales ==
Region	Certification	Certified units/sales
Australia (ARIA)	Gold	35,000^{^}
^{^} Shipments figures based on certification alone.
