= The Block (album) =

Studio album by New Kids on the Block
- Released: September 2, 2008
- Recorded: 2007–08
- Genre: Pop; dance-pop; R&B; blue-eyed soul; pop rock
- Length: 45:40
- Label: Interscope
- Producer: Hakim Abdoulsamad; Nasri Atweh; Polow da Don; Fernando Garibay; Jerome "J-Roc" Harmon; Adida Kavarro; Emanuel Kiriakou; Adam Messinger; Ne-Yo; Aaron "AP" Pearce; RedOne; Teddy Riley; Rick Rock; Aliaune "Akon" Thiam; Timbaland; Donnie Wahlberg

New Kids on the Block chronology
Greatest Hits (1999)	The Block (2008)	NKOTBSB (2011)

Singles from The Block
- 1. "Summertime" Released: May 13, 2008; 2. "Single" Released: August 12, 2008; 3. "Dirty Dancing" Released: December 19, 2008; 4. "2 in the Morning" Released: February 23, 2009

The Block is the sixth studio album by New Kids on the Block. The album was released on September 2, 2008, along with a deluxe edition that included four bonus tracks. It sold 95,000 copies in its first week of release and debuted at number one on the U.S. Top Pop Albums chart and at number two on the Billboard 200. Several artists collaborated on the album, such as Ne-Yo, Lady Gaga, The Pussycat Dolls, Akon, Teddy Riley and New Edition.

The first official single from the album is "Summertime" and the song was released on May 13, 2008. The second official single titled "Single" featuring Ne-Yo was released on August 12, 2008. The third single "Dirty Dancing" was released on December 19. The single was the album's most successful single in Europe and Canada, peaking at number 31 and reaching the number-one position on the CHUM Chart in Toronto on February 21, 2009, after twelve weeks on the chart. The album's fourth single, "2 in the Morning", was officially released February 23, 2009 in the United States and the United Kingdom.

It is the group's first studio album in fourteen years since Face the Music.

== Release and reception ==
Professional ratings
Aggregate scores
Source	Rating
Metacritic	51/100
Review scores
Source	Rating
AllMusic	1.5/5 stars
The A.V. Club	C+
Digital Spy	2/5 stars
Entertainment Weekly	C−
Los Angeles Times	4/4 stars
The Observer	2/5 stars
PopMatters	6/10 stars
Slant Magazine	2.5/5 stars
Virgin Media	3.5/5 stars
Yahoo! Music UK	4/10 stars

The Block was released on September 2, 2008, and debuted at number one on the Billboard Pop Album Chart and at number two on the Billboard 200, selling 95,000 copies in its first week of release. As of April 2013, the album had sold 332,000 copies in the United States. On the Canadian Albums Chart, the album debuted at number one, becoming their first and only number-one album there. It sold 9,000 copies in its first week. The Block has been certified gold in Canada.

In honor of the album's 15th anniversary, the album was re-released as The Block Revisited. In addition to the main album, it compiles the bonus tracks from all previously released editions of the album as well as new remixes and a previously unreleased song, "Coming Home".

== Track listing ==
The Block track listing
No.	Title	Writer(s)	Producer(s)	Length
1.	"Click Click Click"	Aliaune Thiam, Hakim Abdoulsamad, Nasri Atweh, Donnie Wahlberg	Aliaune "Akon" Thiam, Hakim Abdoulsamad, Nasri Atweh, Adam Messinger	3:44
2.	"Single" (with Ne-Yo)	Jamal Jones, Shaffer Smith	Polow da Don, Ne-Yo (co.)	3:55
3.	"Big Girl Now" (featuring Lady Gaga)	RedOne, Lady Gaga, Wahlberg, Jordan Knight	RedOne	3:28
4.	"Summertime"	Wahlberg, Abdulsamad, Atweh	Hakim Abdoulsamad	3:22
5.	"2 in the Morning"	Emanuel Kiriakou, Kasia Livingston, Wahlberg, Zukhan Bey	Emanuel Kiriakou	3:25
6.	"Grown Man" (featuring The Pussycat Dolls and Teddy Riley)	Dejanee Riley, Adida Kavarro, Richard Stanard, Tyler Thurmond, Don Covay	Teddy Riley, Adida Kavarro (co.)	3:00
7.	"Dirty Dancing"	RedOne, Wahlberg, Joaquin Bynum	RedOne	3:37
8.	"Sexify My Love"	RedOne, Wahlberg, Atweh	RedOne	3:31
9.	"Twisted"	Timothy Mosley, Jerome Harmon, James Fauntleroy II	Timbaland, Jerome "J-Roc" Harmon	3:09
10.	"Full Service" (featuring New Edition)	RedOne, Wahlberg, Lady Gaga	RedOne	3:56
11.	"Lights, Camera, Action"	Jones, Brian Kennedy, Cornell Haynes, Jasper Cameron, Lloyd Polite	Polow da Don	3:05
12.	"Put It on My Tab" (featuring Akon)	RedOne, Wahlberg, Atweh, Thiam	RedOne	3:55
13.	"Stare at You"	Atweh, Wahlberg, Adam Messinger, Knight	Nasri Atweh, Donnie Wahlberg, Adam Messinger	3:33

iTunes Store bonus tracks
No.	Title	Writer(s)	Length
14.	"Close to You"	Atweh, Messinger, Joey McIntyre, Wahlberg	3:34
15.	"Summertime" (RedOne remix featuring Jadakiss) (pre-order only bonus track)	Wahlberg, Abdulsamad, Atweh	3:33

US deluxe edition bonus tracks
No.	Title	Writer(s)	Producer(s)	Length
14.	"One Song"	Aaron Pearce, Atweh, Wahlberg	Aaron "AP" Pearce, Nasri (co.), Adam Messinger (co.)	3:42
15.	"Don't Cry"	Fernando Garibay, Livingston	Fernando Garibay	4:12
16.	"Officially Over"	Attozio Towns, Richardo Thomas	Rick Rock	3:59
17.	"Looking Like Danger"	RedOne, Claude Kelly	RedOne	3:08

UK bonus tracks
No.	Title	Writer(s)	Length
14.	"Close to You"	Atweh, Messinger, McIntyre, Wahlberg	3:34
15.	"One Song"	Pearce, Atweh, Wahlberg	3:42

Brazilian bonus track
No.	Title	Writer(s)	Length
14.	"Close to You"	Atweh, Messinger, McIntyre, Wahlberg	3:34

- "Grown Man" contains elements of the Aretha Franklin recording "Chain of Fools", as written by Don Covay. It also contains elements of "What Is Success" written and performed by Allen Toussaint.

== Re-recordings ==
- "Lights, Camera, Action" was re-recorded with the Pussycat Dolls performing the primary vocals and is included on the deluxe edition of their Doll Domination album.
- "Lights, Camera, Action' was also re-recorded for Lloyd's mixtape Lessons in Love 2.0.
- The demo for "Single" appears as the third track on Ne-Yo's album Year of the Gentleman
- "Click Click Click" was originally a song written, produced, and recorded by Nasri.

== Charts ==
=== Weekly charts ===
Weekly chart performance for The Block
Chart (2008)	Peak position
Argentine Albums (CAPIF)	19
Australian Albums (ARIA)	81
Austrian Albums (Ö3 Austria)	69
Canadian Albums (Billboard)	1
German Albums (Offizielle Top 100)	21
Japanese Albums (Oricon)	170
Scottish Albums (Official Charts)	36
Swiss Albums (Schweizer Hitparade)	73
UK Albums (Official Charts)	16
US Billboard 200	2

=== Year-end charts ===
Year-end chart performance for The Block
Chart (2008)	Position
US Billboard 200	177

== Certifications ==
Certifications for The Block
Region	Certification	Certified units/sales
Canada (Music Canada)	Gold	40,000^{^}
^{^} Shipments figures based on certification alone.
