= 2 in the Morning (New Kids on the Block song) =

Single by New Kids on the Block

from the album The Block
- Released: February 23, 2009
- Recorded: 2008
- Genre: Pop
- Length: 3:25
- Label: Interscope
- Songwriters: Emanuel Kiriakou; Donnie Wahlberg; K. Livingston; Z. Bay
- Producer: Emanuel Kiriakou

New Kids on the Block singles chronology
"Dirty Dancing" (2008)	"2 in the Morning" (2009)	"Don't Turn Out the Lights" (2011)

Music video
- "2 In The Morning" at MTV.com

"2 in the Morning" is the fourth single and the third U.S. single release from pop group New Kids on the Block's fifth studio album, The Block. Like many of the songs on The Block, it features lead vocals by Joey McIntyre, Jordan Knight, and Donnie Wahlberg.

== Release ==
It was released on February 23, 2009 in the United States and the United Kingdom. In the United Kingdom, the single was released as digital download only.

== Promotion ==
New Kids on the Block performed the song for the first time on Sessions@AOL then later presented the song on The Today Show with Hoda Kotb and Kathie Lee Gifford and on Live with Regis and Kelly.

== Music video ==
The music video was directed by Meiert Avis, Chris Ledoux and Donnie Wahlberg. It was produced by Jeremy Alter. The video was released on February 23 on AOL. The music video was shot in California at an old mansion in the Pacific Palisades. The video starts with Donnie Wahlberg saying "tick tock" and a man shows a watch reading two o'clock. New Kids On The Block were shown in a foggy/cloudy environment singing the song. The story starts with a man in a car and goes into the house. As he enters, he sees his lady arguing on the phone and tries to comfort her in the living room and the bathroom but she ignored it. Next scene shows the lady checking on her laptop and puts it away as she and her man were going to bed without any words showing no connection when it comes through a difficult time. Then, the story started all over and showing once again the man in the car and the lady arguing on the phone. The lady does the same things again but this time, the man was still in the car. At the end, the couple work things out and hug each other. The girl in the music video was played by model Niki Huey, she also appeared in Jesse McCartney's music video "Leavin'".

== Chart performance ==
After months without being in any charts, the song finally debut on the Canadian Hot 100 around June and reach #76.

== Track listing ==
Promo CD

1. 2 In The Morning [LP Version]

Promo CD 2

1. 2 In The Morning [Radio Remix 1]
2. 2 In The Morning [Radio Remix 2]
3. 2 In The Morning [Album Version]

UK

1. 2 In The Morning
2. 2 In The Morning [Space Cowboy Remix]

== Charts ==
Chart (2009)	Peak position
Canada Hot 100 (Billboard)	76
U.S. Billboard Pop 100	99
U.S. Billboard Pop 100 Airplay	65

== Release history ==
Release dates and formats for "2 in the Morning"
Region	Date	Format	Label(s)	Ref.
United States	March 10, 2009	Mainstream airplay	Interscope	
