= Neverest =

Canadian pop/rock band

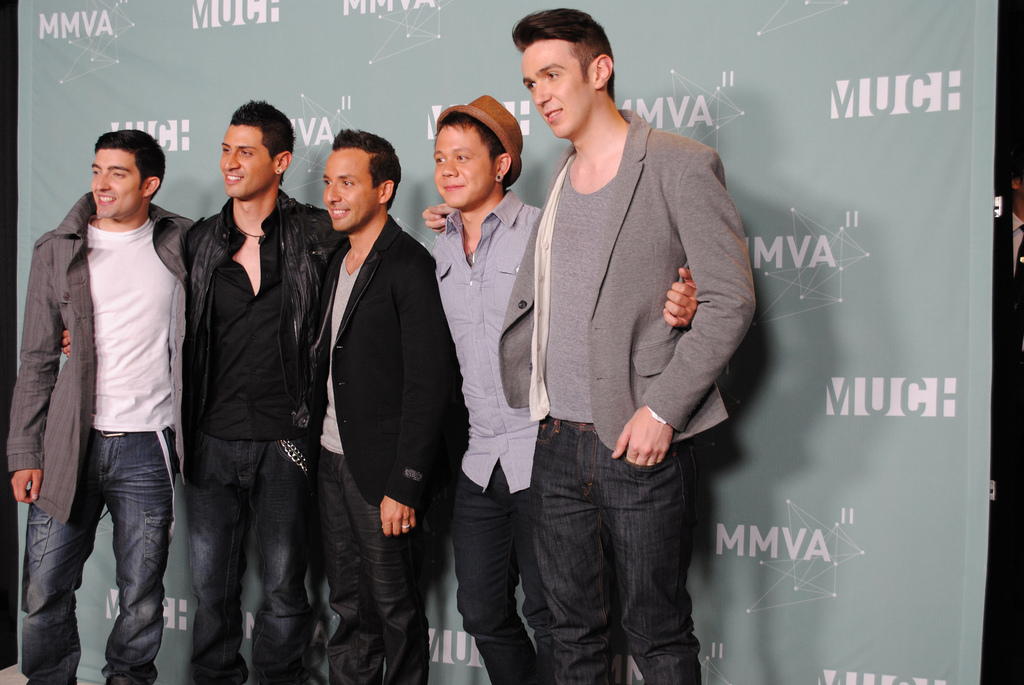
- Neverest with Howie Dorough at the 2011 MuchMusic Video Awards

Background information
- Origin: Toronto, Ontario, Canada
- Genres: Pop, pop-Rock, R&B
- Years active: 2007–2014
- Labels: Vic Park Group / Fontana North / Universal Music
- Members: Spyros "Spee" Chalkiotis; Paul Loduca; Greg Keyes; Mykey Thomas
- Past members: Alex Ciccone; Michael Basilone; Brendan Colameco; Mike Klose
- Website: neverestmusic.com

Neverest was a Canadian pop-rock band from Toronto, Ontario. The band was formed by Spyros "Spee" Chalkiotis and Mike Klose.

== Music career ==
=== About Us EP (2010–breakup) ===
The band released their first single, "About Us", in October 2010. It quickly reached Number 1 on the MuchMusic Top 30 countdown, and Number 30 on the Billboard Canadian Hot 100. Their second single, entitled "Everything", was released in March 2011 and quickly charted the Billboard Canadian Hot 100. The band was managed by Backstreet Boys member Howie Dorough. Neverest was a supporting act on the Canadian tour dates of the NKOTBSB Tour.

Their music video for "Everything" received a nomination for the 2011 MuchMusic Video Awards for Cinematography of the Year.

Neverest released their first EP About Us on March 29, 2011. Soon after, the band embarked on their first ever concert tour, supporting Juno-nominated band Stereos. In 2011, they co-toured with Canadian artist Alyssa Reid all around Canada. Their EP consisted of 8 songs:

1. About Us - 3:17
2. Everything - 3:14
3. Hate It - 3:18
4. The Chase - 3:25
5. Blame Me - 3:13
6. Hello/Goodbye - 3:22
7. About Us (Acoustic) - 3:29
8. About Us (Club Mix) - 3:39

The band's single "About Us" received gold certification from Music Canada on December 2, 2011. In 2012, they sang the Canadian National Anthem at the All Star NBA game.

Neverest performed at We Day Halifax on November 27, 2013. This was the very first time that this event had ever been held east of Montreal. We Day was held at the Metro Centre, located in Halifax, Nova Scotia, Canada.

The band officially broke up in 2015.

== Discography ==
=== Extended plays ===
Year	Album details	Peak
Year	Album details	CAN
2011	About Us EP: Release date: March 29, 2011; Label: Vic Park; Format: CD, digital download	—
"—" denotes releases that did not chart.

=== Singles ===
Year	Title	Peak	Album
Year	Title	^{CAN}	Album
2010	"About Us"	30	About Us EP
2011	"Everything"	52	About Us EP
2011	"Lovesick"	-	N/A
2011	"The Chase"	-	About Us EP
2013	"Rewind"	-	N/A
2014	"Starlight"	-	N/A
2014	"Someday"	-	N/A

== Awards and nominations ==
Year	Title	Award	Result
2011	"Everything"	Much Music MMVA Cinematography of the Year	Nominated
