= Never Let You Go (New Kids on the Block song) =

1994 single by NKOTB

Single by NKOTB

from the album Face the Music
- Released: March 14, 1994
- Genre: Pop; R&B; soul
- Length: 5:28
- Label: Columbia
- Songwriters: Teddy Riley; Leon F. Sylvers III; BLACKstreet; Markell Riley
- Producers: Teddy Riley; Leon F. Sylvers III

NKOTB singles chronology
"Dirty Dawg" (1993)	"Never Let You Go" (1994)	"Summertime" (2008)

Music video
- "Never Let You Go" on YouTube

"Never Let You Go" is a song performed by American boyband New Kids on the Block (as "NKOTB"), released in March 1994 by Columbia Records as the second single from their fifth album, Face the Music (1994). The song is co-written and produced by Teddy Riley and Leon F. Sylvers III, and features Jordan Knight singing lead vocals and Donnie Wahlberg rapping. It reached number 42 on the UK Singles Chart and number 18 on Canada's The Record chart. The video for the song shows Knight and a young woman disputing during the majority of it as he walks aimlessly through the city reminiscing before Wahlberg reunites them. "Never Let You Go" was the last single New Kids on the Block released before their 2008 reunion.

== Critical reception ==
Larry Flick from Billboard magazine wrote, "If people can get over their preconceived notions of NKOTB, they will discover this richly textured, wonderfully sung pop/R&B ballad—the likes of which would add sparkle to any station it graces. Jordan Knight has developed a worldly falsetto, and he is well-served by Teddy Riley's astute production. Donnie Wahlberg's rap injection is fine window dressing. Programmers should listen without prejudice—and then add it." Pan-European magazine Music & Media said, "The kids change the scene drastically. Just used to the hard street lingo of 'Dirty Dawg', we have to adjust our minds to this syrupy soul ballad with a Philly touch."

== Track listings ==
- CD 1
1. "Never Let You Go" (radio version)
2. "Never Let You Go" (LP version)
- CD 2
1. "Never Let You Go" (radio version)
2. "Never Let You Go" (LP version)
3. "Keepin' My Fingers Crossed"

== Charts ==
Chart (1994)	Peak position
Australia (ARIA)	120
Canada (The Record)	18
Scotland Singles (OCC)	50
Spain Airplay (Top 40 Radio)	30
UK Singles (OCC)	42
