= If You Go Away (New Kids on the Block song) =

1991 single by NKOTB

Single by NKOTB

from the album H.I.T.S.
- Released: December 2, 1991
- Recorded: 1991
- Genre: R&B, pop, soul
- Length: 5:28
- Label: Columbia
- Songwriters: John Bettis, Trey Lorenz, Walter Afanasieff
- Producer: Walter Afanasieff

NKOTB singles chronology
"Baby, I Believe in You" (1991)	"If You Go Away" (1991)	"Dirty Dawg" (1993)

"If You Go Away" is a song by American pop group New Kids on the Block (although the group was credited under the moniker of NKOTB on the jacket.) Released as a stand-alone single on 1991, the only new song on the compilation H.I.T.S., it was later included on their 1994 album Face the Music. Written by John Bettis, Trey Lorenz and Walter Afanasieff, the latter of whom also served as the songs producer. Lead vocals are shared by Jordan Knight and Joey McIntyre, with a spoken word by Danny Wood. It was, at that point, the first song the group put out after having split with longtime manager and producer Maurice Starr.

== Reception ==
The song returned the group to the US top twenty, peaking at number sixteen on the Billboard Hot 100 and number nine on the UK Singles Chart, and was a commercial rebound for the group after having seen its three previous songs all fail to reach the Billboard Hot 100. The group performed the song on The Arsenio Hall Show, while addressing an alleged lip-synching controversy. The single was the group's last hit until the release of the top 40 hit "Summertime" in 2008, and to date remains its final top twenty entry.

== Personnel ==
- Jordan Knight, Joey McIntyre: lead vocals
- Danny Wood: spoken voice
- John Bettis, Trey Lorenz: songwriters
- Walter Afanasieff: songwriter, producer, arranger, keyboards, Mini Moog bass, drum programming, percussion, Synclavier acoustic guitar
- Dan Shea: additional synthesizer and MacIntosh programming
- Ren Klyce: Akai AX60 and Synclavier programming
- Michael Landau: guitar
- New Kids on the Block, Claytoven Richardson, Gary Cirimelli, Skyler Jett: background vocals

== Track listings ==
- UK Vinyl, 7"
1. If You Go Away – 4:00
2. Call It What You Want [C&C Pump It Up 7" Mix] – 4:12
- Maxi-CD
1. If You Go Away – 4:00
2. Didn't I (Blow Your Mind) – 4:24
3. Please Don't Go Girl – 4:30
4. I'll Be Loving You (Forever) – 4:22

== Charts ==
Chart (1991-1993)	Peak position
Australia (ARIA)	26
Belgium (Ultratop 50 Flanders)	25
Canada (The Record)	6
Estonia (Eesti Top 20)	1
Europe (Eurochart Hot 100)	33
Germany (GfK)	34
Ireland (IRMA)	26
Israel (Israeli Singles Chart)	27
Luxembourg (Radio Luxembourg)	10
Netherlands (Dutch Top 40)	9
Netherlands (Single Top 100)	10
Norway (VG-lista)	4
Spain Airplay (Top 40 Radio)	6
Sweden (Sverigetopplistan)	25
UK Singles (Official Charts)	9
US Billboard Hot 100	16
