= NKOTBSB =

American pop supergroup

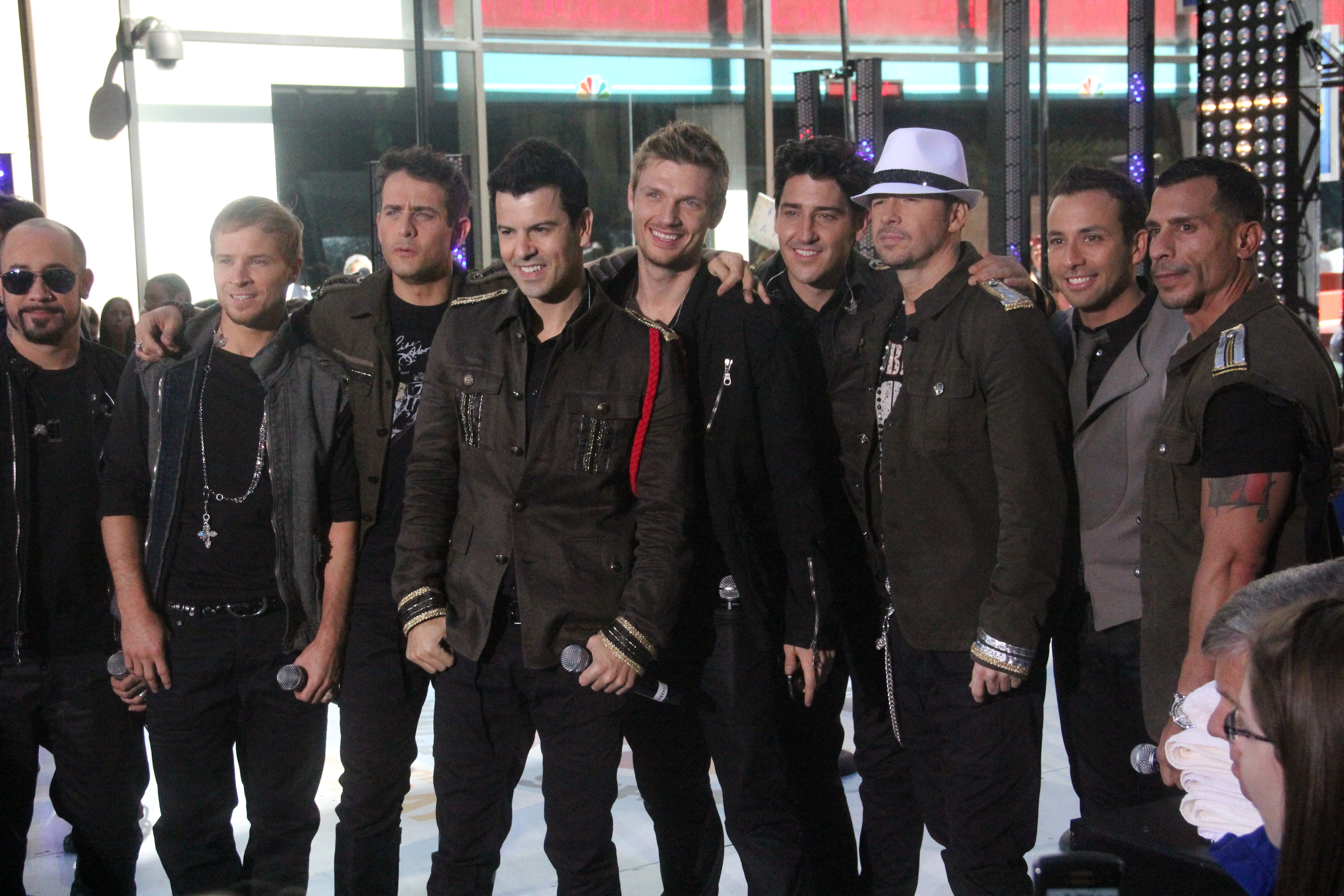
- The band in 2011

Background information
- Origin: United States
- Genres: Pop; dance-pop; R&B; blue-eyed soul; pop rock
- Years active: 2010–2012
- Labels: Legacy; Columbia; Jive
- Spinoff of: New Kids on the Block; Backstreet Boys
- Past members: Jonathan Knight; Danny Wood; Donnie Wahlberg; Jordan Knight; Joey McIntyre; Howie Dorough; Brian Littrell; AJ McLean; Nick Carter
- Website: nkotbsb.com

NKOTBSB were an American pop supergroup consisting of the members of American boy bands New Kids on the Block and Backstreet Boys. Howie Dorough of the Backstreet Boys came up with the name, which is a combination of established initialisms of each groups' names, NKOTB and BSB. Together they have released one compilation album, the eponymous NKOTBSB (2011) and one single, "Don't Turn Out the Lights". They toured in North America, Europe, Australia, and Asia in 2011 and 2012.

== History ==
In summer 2010, the Backstreet Boys joined New Kids on the Block on stage at the Radio City Music Hall in New York at their invitation and performed "I Want It That Way". The show was a part of NKOTB's Casi-NO Tour. Since the performance, the media began to circulate rumors of the two uniting for a tour in the summer of 2011.

On October 8, 2010, Brian Littrell, a member of the Backstreet Boys, gave the tour a 78% chance of happening. He also stated that he and Donnie Wahlberg, a member of New Kids on the Block, had been working on some songs together.

The tour was officially announced to begin in the summer of 2011 on On Air with Ryan Seacrest on November 8, 2010. During the interview, it was mentioned that the groups were recording a single to be released later. To promote the tour further, the groups conducted a live Q&A session on Ustream on the same day.

The newly formed supergroup first performed together at the closing of 38th Annual American Music Awards on November 21, 2010, to give the public a taste of what they would see on the tour, and again on the 2011 Dick Clark's New Year's Rockin' Eve with Ryan Seacrest.

On March 14, 2011, the group announced that they would be releasing a joint compilation album on May 24, 2011. The album featured five tracks from each group and some new recordings by the combined supergroup. The single, titled "Don't Turn Out the Lights", was premiered on April 5, 2011 on On Air with Ryan Seacrest.

The NKOTBSB Tour started at the Allstate Arena in Rosemont, Illinois on May 25, 2011. On June 3, 2011, while in the middle of the tour, they went to Rockefeller Center to perform together at The Today Show.

The tour ended on June 3, 2012, in Pasay, Philippines, and they performed one last time on August 18, 2012, in Hershey, PA, at Summer Mixtape Festival. The performance was also their only North American appearance in 2012.

During a show in London on April 29, 2012, while announcing original member Kevin Richardson's return to the Backstreet Boys, Littrell hinted that they might play some shows with all ten members in the future. In August 2012, members of New Kids on the Block also stated during Mixtape Festival that while it was their last performance together for quite some time, they might get back together down the line, and they hope there will be many more shows with the Backstreet Boys in the future. They also said that NKOTBSB is like another group altogether.

== Members ==
NKOTB

- Jonathan Knight
- Danny Wood
- Donnie Wahlberg
- Jordan Knight
- Joey McIntyre

BSB

- Howie Dorough
- Brian Littrell
- AJ McLean
- Nick Carter

== Discography ==
=== Compilation albums ===
- NKOTBSB (2011)

=== Singles ===
- "Don't Turn Out the Lights" (2011)

== Awards ==
- NewNowNext Awards (2011)
  - Best New Indulgence: New Kids on the Block/Backstreet Boys – Summer Tour 2011

== Tours ==
- NKOTBSB Tour (2011–2012)

== See also ==
- New Kids on the Block
- Backstreet Boys
