= Face the Music (New Kids on the Block album) =

Studio album by NKOTB
- Released: January 25, 1994
- Recorded: 1993
- Genres: Pop; R&B; new jack swing
- Length: 66:43
- Label: Columbia
- Producers: Donnie Wahlberg; Jordan Knight; Teddy Riley; Leon Sylvers III; Walter Afanasieff; Richard Wolf; Jason Hess; Tom Soars; Narada Michael Walden (For Perfection Light Productions); Mike Mani; Monty Seward; Brad Young; Dow Brain

NKOTB chronology
| H.I.T.S. (1991) | Face the Music (1994) | Greatest Hits (1999) |

Singles from Face the Music
- 1. "If You Go Away" Released: December 14, 1991; 2. "Dirty Dawg" Released: December 21, 1993; 3. "Never Let You Go" Released: January 11, 1994

Face the Music is the fifth studio album by American boyband New Kids on the Block, released on January 25, 1994. The album debuted at number 37 on the Billboard 200 in the United States, with first-week sales of 27,000 copies. According to Nielsen SoundScan, the album had sold 138,000 copies in the US as of 2008.

== Background ==
In 1993, after about two years out of the limelight, the New Kids went back into the studio and began recording their fifth studio album, before splitting up a year later. By this point, due to a strong backlash and allegations of lip-syncing, the group pushed for a more mature image and focused on recording songs that would appeal to their aging fans. In addition, they had outgrown the "New Kids" name: Joey McIntyre was 21, Jordan Knight was 23, Donnie Wahlberg and Danny Wood were 24, and Jonathan Knight was 25 years old.

Jordan Knight, Wahlberg, and Wood fought for creative input and control, as most of their material was previously rejected by producer Maurice Starr in favor of his own compositions. Having been dogged with an "uncool" stigma, the boys decided to sever their ties with Starr, who had been instrumental in their early success. At the request of Columbia Records, they shortened their name to the more mature-sounding NKOTB. Instead of the bubblegum and teen pop songs that established the New Kids in the music industry, Face the Music was built around a more up to date R&B and New jack swing sound.

The album also included the track "Keep on Smilin" the group previously recorded for the film Free Willy, and it was also one of their first recordings since undergoing the name change. "Dirty Dawg" did fairly well on the charts, but a Canadian station (MuchMusic) banned the music video due to its suggested violence and misogynistic themes. Although not a major commercial success, the critical reception was positive, and a cross-country tour was in the works. However, NKOTB quickly found that they could only get bookings at nightclubs and theatres, a far cry from the arenas and stadiums they had been accustomed to playing in while in their peak years. During the tour, Jonathan Knight dropped out of the band due to increased panic attacks and anxiety. Faced with the fact that their fanbase had grown up and moved on to grunge and gangsta rap, the rest of the group decided to cease touring and NKOTB went on hiatus until 2008.

== Singles ==
- "If You Go Away" – December 14, 1991 (First released on greatest hits album H.I.T.S.)
- "Dirty Dawg" – December 21, 1993
- "Never Let You Go" – January 11, 1994

== Critical reception ==
Professional ratings
Review scores
| Source | Rating |
|---|---|
| AllMusic | 3/5 stars |
| Billboard | (favorable) |
| The Michigan Daily | (favorable) |
| Smash Hits | 5/5 stars |
| Los Angeles Times | 1.5/4 stars |
| Gavin Report | (favorable) |

Stephen Thomas Erlewine of AllMusic noted that Face the Music marked a stylistic shift for New Kids on the Block, with their sound incorporating elements of new jack swing and a rougher R&B style. He commented that the lyrics were slightly edgier and the hip-hop influences sounded more authentic, suggesting that even the most skeptical listeners might be impressed by some tracks on the album. A review published in Billboard described the album as assertive and full of potential, highlighting tracks such as "Dirty Dawg" and "You Got the Flavor" as radio-friendly standouts. The review also praised the production quality and credited notable figures like Teddy Riley and Narada Michael Walden for their involvement in shaping the album's sound.

In The Michigan Daily, Eugene Bowen wrote that while the group attempted to update their image and sound, much of the album still resembled the group's earlier material, with many tracks sounding like reworkings of older hits. Bowen observed that the group's attempt to embrace a more "gangsta-ish" style did not significantly differentiate them from their pop origins, though he acknowledged a few faster-paced and smoother songs as highlights. Matt Carlson of the same journal also contributed a second review, calling the album “wicked awesome” and praising its mix of hip-hop beats and fun, high-energy tracks. He described songs like "You Got the Flavor" and "Dirty Dawg" as strong entries that showed the group's evolution, and remarked on the group's attempt to present a more socially aware image. Donnie Wahlberg's rap verses and Joey McIntyre's vocal performances were singled out as notable moments.

In Smash Hits, Leesa Daniels referred to New Kids on the Block as pioneers of the boy band genre and complimented Face the Music as a solid pop effort. She highlighted "Dirty Dawg", "If You Go Away", "Keep On Smilin'", and "Girls" as representative tracks, describing the album as a blend of swingbeat and pop, and calling it "a gorgeous mix".

In Los Angeles Times, Chris Willman mentioned: "They can run, but they can’t hide: It’ll take more than an acronym trick for those New Kids on the Block to pull the wool over our eyes. “Face the Music” represents the vocal quintet’s bid at holding onto its old bubble-gum audience while moving boldly ahead toward earning its hip-hop “props.” The first few cuts, designed to establish NKOTB’s newfound street savvy, are particularly embarrassing: Dig the four-letter words and Public Enemy influences in the intro! Thrill as Donnie Wahlberg proves he was the brains behind Marky Mark in “Dirty Dawg,” in which they be dissin’ a ho, man!"

In Gavin Report, Annette M. Lai wrote: "The "kids" from Boston are back, only now they're men and have shortened their name to five simple letters-NKOTB. (And shame on you who still call them "New Kids!") For Face The Music they've enlisted the songwriting/production talents of Teddy Riley, Walter Afanasieff and Narada Michael Walden to deliver 67+ minutes of hook laden tunes. Automatic favorites are the mid-tempo "Girls," "Never Let You Go" (which some stations are playing as an album cut),"Mrs. Right," featuring vocals, and the ballads "Since You Walked Into My Life" and "I'll Still Be Loving You." Lukewarm radio response to the first single, "Dirty Dawg" may be related more to image than musical quality. Hopefully this album will be given a chance to demonstrate that their talent is intact and deserves to be heard.

== Track listing ==
Face the Music track listing
| No. | Title | Writer(s) | Producer(s) | Length |
|---|---|---|---|---|
| 1. | "Intro: Face the Music" | Donnie Wahlberg | Wahlberg | 2:14 |
| 2. | "You Got the Flavor" | Teddy Riley, BLACKstreet, Markell Riley | T. Riley | 4:50 |
| 3. | "Dirty Dawg" | Wahlberg, Larry Thomas, J.R. Jackson, Jordan Knight, John Johnson, Nice & Smooth | Wahlberg | 4:15 |
| 4. | "Girls" | Teddy Riley, Leon Sylvers III, M. Riley, BLACKstreet, | T. Riley, Sylvers | 4:28 |
| 5. | "If You Go Away" | Walter Afanasieff, John Bettis, Trey Lorenz | Afanasieff | 5:30 |
| 6. | "Keep on Smilin'" | Narada Michael Walden, Sylvester Jackson, Sally Jo Dakota | Walden | 4:35 |
| 7. | "Never Let You Go" | T. Riley, Sylvers, Antwone Dickey, M. Riley | T. Riley, Sylvers | 5:34 |
| 8. | "Keepin' My Fingers Crossed" | Richard Wolf, Knight, Wahlberg, James Wirrick | Wolf | 4:18 |
| 9. | "Mrs. Right" | Wahlberg, Larry Thomas, R. Jackson, Joe McIntyre, J. Johnson | Wahlberg | 5:03 |
| 10. | "Since You Walked into My Life" | Afanasieff, Knight, Bettis | Afanasieff | 6:24 |
| 11. | "Let's Play House" | Jason Hess, Melissa Ritter, Wahlberg | Wahlberg, Knight, Jason Hess, Tom Soars^{[a]} | 4:58 |
| 12. | "I Can't Believe It's Over" | Walden, Knight, Dakota | Walden | 5:08 |
| 13. | "I'll Still Be Loving You" | Walden, Dakota, Mike Mani, Monty Seward | Walden, Mani^{[b]}, Seward^{[b]} | 5:09 |
| 14. | "I'll Be Waitin'" | Danny Wood, B. McClain, Brian Young, Dow Brain, Eric Barrier, William Griffin | Wood, Brad Young^{[c]}, Dow Brain^{[c]} | 4:34 |

International edition bonus track
| No. | Title | Writer(s) | Producer(s) | Length |
|---|---|---|---|---|
| 15. | "Dawgappella" | Wahlberg, Thomas, J.R. Jackson, Knight, Johnson, Nice & Smooth | Wahlberg | 4:14 |

Sample credits

- "Intro: Face the Music" contains samples from "360 Degrees" by Grand Puba. It also embodies portions of "DWYCK" by Gang Starr featuring Nice & Smooth, and of "Take It Personal" by Gang Starr.
- "Dirty Dawg" contains a sample of "Papa Don't Take No Mess" by James Brown.
- "Girls" contains a sample of "Girls, Girls, Girls" by Moments & Whatnauts.
- "Let's Play House" contains a sample of "Around The Way Girl" by L.L. Cool J.
- "I'll Be Waitin'" contains a sample of "Eric B Is President" by Eric B. & Rakim.

Notes

- ^{^[a]} signifies a remixer
- ^{^[b]} signifies an associate producer
- ^{^[c]} signifies a co-producer

== Personnel ==
Adapted from the album's liner notes.

"Intro: Face the Music"

- Lead vocals by Donnie Wahlberg

"You Got the Flavor"

- Lead vocals by Jordan Knight
- Rap by Donnie Wahlberg
- Live instrumentals by Teddy Riley

Backing Vocals by Joey McIntyre Jordan Knight, Donnie Wahlberg,Danny Wood, Levi Little, Joe Stonestreet, Chauncey Hannibal, and Jonathan Knight

"Dirty Dawg"

- Lead vocals by Jordan Knight
- Rap by Nice & Smooth
- Live instrumentals and background vocals by Larry Thomas
- Additional Backing Vocals – AJ Tavares, Brandon Tavares, Brent Tavares, Larry Thomas
- Scratches – Jeff Gamere

"Girls"

- Lead vocals by Jordan Knight and Joey McIntyre
- Rap by Donnie Wahlberg
- Live instrumentals by Teddy Riley

Backing Vocals by Joey McIntyre Jordan Knight, Donnie Wahlberg,Danny Wood, Levi Little, Joe Stonestreet, Chauncey Hannibal, and Jonathan Knight

"If You Go Away"

- Lead vocals by Jordan Knight and Joe McIntyre
- Ad libs by Danny Wood
- Additional Backing Vocals – Claytoven Richardson, Gary Cirimelli, Skyler Jett
- Guitar – Michael Landau
- Mixed By – Dana Jon Chappelle

"Keep on Smilin'"

- Lead vocals by Jordan Knight, Joe McIntyre, Donnie Wahlberg and Danny Wood

"Never Let You Go"

- Lead vocals by Jordan Knight
- Rap by Donnie Wahlberg
- Live instrumentals by Teddy Riley

Backing Vocals by Joey McIntyre Jordan Knight, Donnie Wahlberg,Danny Wood, Levi Little, Joe Stonestreet, Chauncey Hannibal, and Jonathan Knight

"Keepin' My Fingers Crossed"

- Lead vocals by Jordan Knight
- Rap by Donnie Wahlberg
- Guitar and keyboards by Richard Wolf
- Drums and programming by Greg Lawson and Darryl Swann

"Mrs. Right"

- Lead vocals by Joe McIntyre
- Live instrumentals by Donnie Wahlberg and Larry Thomas
- Scratches by Jeff Gamere
- Additional Backing Vocals – AJ Tavares, Brandon Tavares, Brent Tavares, Larry Thomas

Mixed By – Tom Soares

"Since You Walked into My Life"

- Lead vocals by Jordan Knight and Joe McIntyre
- Spoken by Danny Wood
- Additional Backing Vocals – Claytoven Richardson, Gary Cirimelli, Skyler Jett
- Mixed By – Dana Jon Chappelle
- Producer, Arranged By, Keyboards, Syn

"Let's Play House"

- Lead vocals by Jordan Knight
- Rap by Donnie Wahlberg
- Additional Backing Vocals – Byron Mitchell, Dee Harvey

Guitar – Larry Thomas Mixed By – Elliott Peters

"I Can't Believe It's Over"

- Lead vocals by Jordan Knight
- Additional Backing Vocals – Claytoven Richardson, Monty Seward, Skyler Jett
- Keyboards, Programmed By [Keyboards] – Mike Mani, Monty Seward
- Mixed By – David Frazer
- Producer, Arranged By – Narada Michael Walden

"I'll Still Be Loving You"

- Lead vocals by Joe McIntyre
- Additional Backing Vocals – Claytoven Richardson, Monty Seward, Preston Glass, Skyler Jett
- Mixed By – David Frazer

"I'll Be Waitin'"

- Lead vocals by Danny Wood and Joe McIntyre
- Live instrumentals by Dow Brain, Brad Young, and Danny Wood

== Charts ==
Chart performance for Face the Music
| Chart (1994) | Peak position |
|---|---|
| Australian Albums (ARIA) | 18 |
| Canadian Albums (RPM) | 34 |
| Dutch Albums (Album Top 100) | 72 |
| European Albums Chart | 54 |
| Finnish Albums (Suomen virallinen lista) | 10 |
| French Albums (SNEP) | 21 |
| German Albums (Offizielle Top 100) | 44 |
| Japanese Albums (Oricon) | 11 |
| Scottish Albums (Official Charts) | 56 |
| Spanish Albums (PROMUSICAE) | 11 |
| Swedish Albums (Sverigetopplistan) | 46 |
| Swiss Albums (Schweizer Hitparade) | 38 |
| UK Albums (Official Charts) | 36 |
| US Billboard 200 | 37 |
| US Top R&B/Hip-Hop Albums (Billboard) | 24 |
