= Dirty Dancing (song) =

Single by New Kids on the Block

from the album The Block
- Released: December 19, 2008 (Germany)
- Recorded: 2008
- Genre: Pop; urban pop; rocksteady
- Length: 3:37
- Label: Interscope
- Songwriters: Donnie Wahlberg; RedOne; Joaquin Bynum
- Producer: RedOne

New Kids on the Block singles chronology
"Single" (2008)	"Dirty Dancing" (2008)	"2 in the Morning" (2009)

"Dirty Dancing" is the third overall single from New Kids on the Block's 2008 album, The Block. It was produced by RedOne. The lead vocals were sung by Jordan Knight and Donnie Wahlberg. A new version of the song featuring South Korea boy band Seventeen was released to coincide the fifteenth anniversary of their album release, The Block.

== Song information ==
"Dirty Dancing" was only released in Germany on December 19, 2008, as the second single from the album in that market. However, the song has charted in Canada, Austria and on the European Hot 100. It became The Block's most successful single in Europe.

== Critical reception ==
British tabloid The News Letter described the song as "more sophisticated than the blaring, synth-heavy pop of their classic years". In its review of The Block, Sputnik Music said: "to the wafer-thin sexual metaphors of ‘Dirty Dancing’". Slant Magazine said: "they show their age by pretending it's still 1987 on "Dirty Dancing" ("Ooh, it's so crazy/She's like Baby/I'm like Swayze")". In its review of The Block, The A.V. Club stated that "in songs like "Dirty Dancing" they… well, they merely sound like a boy band, and pay for the simple incongruity of it all" Now Magazine comments on the song: "Throwback references date their fan base, though, with songs like Dirty Dancing (“She’s like Baby, I’m like Swayze”)". British newspaper Lisburn Today described it as "sexy". In its review of The Block, Billboard declared: "They also turn an homage to "Dirty Dancing" into a bump and grind that is far, far from the innocence of the Patrick Swayze original, or the New Kids music, for that matter".

== Promotion ==
New Kids on the Block sang an excerpt from the song at 2008 American Music Awards as well as Good Morning America.

== Music video ==
Shot in a medieval background, the video, directed by Til Schweiger, intersperses scenes from the German film "The 1½ Knights - In Search of the Ravishing Princess Herzelinde" (German title: "1½ Ritter - Auf der Suche nach der hinreißenden Herzelinde"), in which he appears, with footage of the band performing the song in front of a mostly all-female audience.

== Track listing ==
Germany

1. Dirty Dancing [RedOne mix]
2. Dirty Dancing [Video]

Maxi Single

1. Dirty Dancing [RedOne mix]
2. Looking Like Danger
3. Dirty Dancing [Music video]

== Chart performance ==
The song debuted at #92 on the German Singles Chart and peaked at #23. On the Canadian Hot 100 it also debuted at #92 and is now at #31 and on the Hot Canadian Digital Singles Chart debuted at #72 and then rose to #59. It debuted at #100 on the Canadian Airplay Chart and it peaked at #72. The single debuted at #82 on the European Hot 100. In its second week, it rose to #76. The song remained on chart for four weeks. In Austria, the song debuted at #65 and after having fallen a week later, rose to #71 in its third week on the chart.

"Dirty Dancing" has gathered 17,577,000 audience impressions and 3,354 total spins in the United States of America to date, without being officially released.

"Dirty Dancing" reached the #1 position on the CHUM chart in Toronto on February 21, 2009. "Dirty Dancing" has been on the CHUM Chart 12 weeks before reaching #1.

== Charts ==
Chart (2008–2009)	Peak position
Austrian Singles Chart	65
Canadian Hot 100	31
European Hot 100	76
German Singles Chart	23
