= Don't Turn Out the Lights =

Single by NKOTBSB

from the album NKOTBSB
- Released: April 5, 2011
- Recorded: Fall 2010
- Studio: Chalice Recording (Los Angeles)
- Genre: Pop
- Length: 3:31
- Label: Sony; Legacy
- Songwriters: Jess Cates; Claude Kelly; Emanuel Kiriakou
- Producer: Emanuel Kiriakou

New Kids on the Block singles chronology
"2 in the Morning" (2009)	"Don't Turn Out the Lights" (2011)	"Remix (I Like The)" (2013)

Backstreet Boys singles chronology
"Bigger" (2009)	"Don't Turn Out the Lights" (2011)	"It's Christmas Time Again" (2012)

"Don't Turn Out the Lights" is a song by American vocal groups New Kids on the Block and Backstreet Boys from their collaboration compilation album, NKOTBSB. The song's lead vocals are provided by NKOTB members Joey McIntyre, Donnie Wahlberg, and Jordan Knight, and every Backstreet Boys member at the time. The song was written by Jess Cates, Claude Kelly, Emanuel Kiriakou, and produced by Kiriakou.

A sneak preview of "Don't Turn Out the Lights" was played by Backstreet Boys members Brian Littrell and AJ McLean on the Backstreet Boys 2010 Cruise and was leaked to the internet on April 1, 2011. On April 5, 2011, the song premiered on On Air with Ryan Seacrest and was released to iTunes in the US and Canada as the lead single from the album by Legacy Recordings. The single debuted at number 14 on the US Billboard Bubbling Under Hot 100 chart on April 14, 2011.

== Track listing ==
- Digital download
1. "Don't Turn Out the Lights" – 3:31
- German CD single
1. "Don't Turn Out the Lights" – 3:33
2. "Don't Turn Out the Lights" (instrumental) – 3:30

== Charts ==
Chart (2011)	Peak position
Canada Hot 100 (Billboard)	46
Canada AC (Billboard)	33
Canada CHR/Top 40 (Billboard)	42
Canada Hot AC (Billboard)	18
US Bubbling Under Hot 100 (Billboard)	14

== Release history ==
Release dates and formats for "Don't Turn Out the Lights"
Region	Date	Format	Label(s)	Ref.
United States	April 26, 2011	Mainstream airplay	Columbia	
