= NKOTBSB (album) =

Compilation album by NKOTBSB
- Released: May 24, 2011
- Recorded: 1988–2011
- Length: 54:48
- Label: Legacy, Columbia, Jive

New Kids on the Block chronology
The Block (2008)	NKOTBSB (2011)	10 (2013)

Backstreet Boys chronology
Playlist: The Very Best of Backstreet Boys (2010)	NKOTBSB (2011)	In a World Like This (2013)

Singles from NKOTBSB
- 1. "Don't Turn Out the Lights" Released: April 5, 2011

NKOTBSB is the only compilation album by American supergroup NKOTBSB, which consists of New Kids on the Block and Backstreet Boys. The album was released on May 24, 2011, and features five hits from each group, two new joint recordings "All in My Head" and "Don't Turn Out the Lights", as well as a mash up. The album debuted at number seven in the US, selling 40,000 in the first week of its release. The album coincides with the joint tour featuring the groups, starting at the Allstate Arena in Rosemont, Illinois on May 25, 2011. The album received a Gold sales certification in the UK.

== Background ==
Both bands first performed together at the Radio City Music Hall in the summer of 2010, and a joint tour was announced later that year. In March 2011, fans were encouraged to vote online for their favourite tracks from the separate groups; choices that would influence the track list for their joint compilation album. After nearly 250,000 votes, the track listing of "NKOTBSB" was announced on April 11, 2011. It also features two new tracks, "Don't Turn Out the Lights" and "All in My Head", as well as an "NKOTBSB Mashup". "All in My Head" was originally an unreleased track by the Backstreet Boys for their album This Is Us, while the mashup features a collection hits by the supergroup, similar to their AMA performance.

The album is available in several editions. The regular edition features a 16-page booklet with personal messages from each member of the supergroup, and a tour poster. Each edition comes with an instant download of "Don't Turn Out the Lights". Additionally, all those who pre-ordered the album have their names featured in a poster that comes with the album. A deluxe edition was exclusively released at Wal-Mart. This edition features a DVD showing rehearsals for the NKOTBSB Tour along with the recording session for the new songs.

== Singles ==
"Don't Turn Out the Lights" was released as the lead single from the album on April 5, 2011 by Legacy Recordings. The track made its first appearance in December on the BSB Cruise. The song premiered on On Air with Ryan Seacrest and released to iTunes the same day. The single debuted at number #14 on the US Billboard Bubbling Under Hot 100 Singles chart on April 14, 2011.

== Track listing ==
Standard edition
No.	Title	Writer(s)	Group	Length
1.	"Step by Step" (from Step by Step)	Maurice Starr	New Kids on the Block	4:25
2.	"I Want It That Way" (from Millennium)	Max Martin, Andreas Carlsson	Backstreet Boys	3:29
3.	"You Got It (The Right Stuff)" (from Hangin' Tough)	Starr	New Kids on the Block	4:08
4.	"Everybody (Backstreet's Back)" (from Backstreet Boys ('U.S.)/Backstreet's Back)	Martin, Denniz Pop	Backstreet Boys	4:44
5.	"Please Don't Go Girl" (from Hangin' Tough)	Starr	New Kids on the Block	4:07
6.	"As Long as You Love Me" (from Backstreet Boys (U.S.)/Backstreet's Back)	Martin	Backstreet Boys	3:29
7.	"Hangin' Tough" (from Hangin' Tough)	Starr	New Kids on the Block	3:45
8.	"Larger Than Life" (from Millennium)	Martin, Brian Littrell, Kristian Lundin	Backstreet Boys	3:50
9.	"I'll Be Loving You (Forever)" (from Hangin' Tough)	Starr	New Kids on the Block	4:19
10.	"Quit Playing Games (With My Heart)" (from Backstreet Boys (U.S.)/Backstreet Boys (Int'l))	Martin, Herbie Crichlow	Backstreet Boys	3:51
11.	"All in My Head"	Nadir Khayat, Teddy Sky, Gustav Efraimsson	NKOTBSB	3:51
12.	"Don't Turn Out the Lights"	Emanuel Kiriakou, Jess Cates, Claude Kelly	NKOTBSB	3:29
13.	"NKOTBSB Mashup"		NKOTBSB	6:35
Total length:				54:48

Deluxe edition bonus DVD
No.	Title	Length
14.	"Don't Turn Out the Lights Recording Session"
15.	"NKOTBSB Tour Rehearsal"
16.	"NKOTBSB Photo Shoot"

== Chart positions ==
Chart performance for NKOTBSB
Chart (2011)	Peak position
Australian Albums (ARIA)	38
Canadian Albums (Billboard)	6
Mexican Albums (Top 100 Mexico)	70
Spanish Albums (PROMUSICAE)	29
US Billboard 200	7

== Certifications ==
Region	Certification	Certified units/sales
United Kingdom (BPI)	Gold	100,000^{‡}
^{‡} Sales+streaming figures based on certification alone.
