= Single (New Kids on the Block and Ne-Yo song) =

Single by New Kids on the Block and Ne-Yo

from the album The Block and Year of the Gentleman
- Released: August 12, 2008
- Genre: Pop; R&B
- Length: 3:55
- Label: Interscope
- Songwriters: Shaffer Smith; Jamal Jones
- Producers: Polow da Don; Ne-Yo; Adam Messinger

New Kids on the Block singles chronology
| "Summertime" (2008) | "Single" (2008) | "Dirty Dancing" (2008) |

Ne-Yo singles chronology
| "Miss Independent" (2008) | "Single" (2008) | "Camera Phone" (2008) |

Alternative cover
- Digital cover

"Single" is the second single from New Kids on the Block's fifth studio album, The Block, which is a duet with Ne-Yo. The lead vocals were sung by Joey McIntyre, Donnie Wahlberg, and Jordan Knight. Donnie also rapped in the song.

The song was released on August 12, 2008 as a digital download. According to allaccess.com, the single impacted radio on September 2, 2008. the same day the album was released. The song was released as a CD single in the UK on November 11, 2008.

Ne-Yo included a solo version of the song on his album Year of the Gentleman with a length of 4:18.

== Music video ==
The music video premiered on TRL on September 4, 2008. The music video was directed by Benny Boom. The video takes place at Jet Nightclub at The Mirage in Las Vegas.

The video begins with a girl (portrayed by Yasmin Deliz) arriving in a taxi cab alone. She meets with her friend in front of the Jet Club and they go in together. Inside, the girl, throughout the video, encounters each of the five members of New Kids on the Block. All of them innocently flirt with her. Each time, the girl is very charmed and/or a bit bewildered (due to in some instances, that one or two of the members are turning up in unexpected places wherever she is). This could also signify the theme of the song meaning that despite having no boyfriend there to spend some quality time with her, she does not have to be alone in order to enjoy herself, and that there's always someone there if need be, at least temporarily.

The band and Ne-Yo are seen hanging out together with some girls in the VIP.

The video also features Ne-Yo and New Kids on the Block performing separately, in front of a backdrop.

== Track listing ==
Digital Download

1. Single (feat. Ne-Yo)

Promo CD

1. Single [LP Version]

Promo CD 2

1. Single [Radio Edit - No Intro]
2. Single [Album Version]

UK Version

1. Single [Album Version]
2. Looking Like Danger

== Charts ==
The song debuted at number 72 in Canadian Hot 100 and has since then risen to number 42. In the U.S. it also debuted at number 86 on the Pop 100 and rose to number 56.

| Chart (2008) | Peak position |
|---|---|
| Australia (ARIA) | 116 |
| Canada (Canadian Hot 100) | 42 |
| Scottish Singles Sales (Official Charts) | 27 |
| South Korea (Gaon International Chart) | 3 |
| UK Singles (Official Charts) | 81 |
| UK Singles Downloads (Official Charts) | 99 |
| US Bubbling Under Hot 100 Singles (Billboard) | 7 |
| US Hot Dance Club Songs (Billboard) | 29 |
| US Mainstream Top 40 (Billboard) | 39 |

== Release history ==
Release dates and formats for "Single"
| Region | Date | Format | Label(s) | Ref. |
|---|---|---|---|---|
| United States | September 2, 2008 | Mainstream airplay | Interscope | |
