= Summertime (New Kids on the Block song) =

Single by New Kids on the Block

from the album The Block
- Released: May 13, 2008
- Recorded: 2008
- Genre: Pop; urban pop
- Length: 3:25
- Label: Interscope
- Songwriters: Nasri; Donnie Wahlberg
- Producers: Hakim Abdulsamad; RedOne; Adam Messinger

New Kids on the Block singles chronology
"Never Let You Go" (1994)	"Summertime" (2008)	"Single" (2008)

"Summertime" is song by New Kids on the Block, and the first single from their album The Block. The single was released on May 13, 2008, and was the first new single released by the group since 1994.

On May 5, 2008, "Summertime" was posted on the group's MySpace page. The lead vocals were sung by Donnie Wahlberg, Jordan Knight, and Joey McIntyre.

The song's introduction has Joey McIntyre shouting out "Jones Beach! 1988!", referring to their rising popularity in that year.

== Music video ==
The music video to the song premiered on VH1 on June 8, 2008. The video was directed by Thomas Kloss and Donnie Wahlberg. The video begins with Donnie exiting a hangar and texting the band members with the message, "It's on." He then boards a helicopter that is waiting for him. The other band members are each shown receiving the message while they are doing various activities like swimming or running and they head off to the beach. They are then shown singing on the beach and at a party.

== Chart performance ==
The song peaked at number 36 on the Billboard Hot 100, becoming their first Top 50 hit since 1992's "If You Go Away". It has also peaked at number 24 on the Pop 100.

On the Canadian Hot 100 it made a "Hot Shot Debut" at number 17 rose to the top ten, peaking at number 9.

In Australia, the single peaked at number 90 on the ARIA Singles Chart, and number 23 on the ARIA physical sales chart.

== Track listing ==
Promo CD

1. "Summertime" (LP version)

Limited promo CD

1. "Summertime" (album version)
2. "Summertime" (RedOne remix)
3. "Summertime" (instrumental)
4. "Summertime" (video)

UK Part 1

1. "Summertime" (album version)
2. "Summertime" (RedOne remix)

UK Part 2

1. "Summertime" (album version)
2. "Summertime" (RedOne remix)
3. "Summertime" (video)

== Charts ==
=== Weekly charts ===
Chart (2008)	Peak position
Australia (ARIA)	90
Canada Hot 100 (Billboard)	9
European Hot 100	99
Germany (GfK)	55
Scottish Singles Sales (Official Charts)	8
UK Singles (Official Charts)	34
UK Hip Hop/R&B (Official Charts)	1
US Billboard Hot 100	36
US Pop Airplay (Billboard)	18

=== Year-end charts ===
Chart (2008)	Position
Canada (Canadian Hot 100)	59

== Release history ==
Region	Date	Format(s)	Label	Ref.
United States	May 13, 2008	Digital download	Interscope	
United States	May 20, 2008	Contemporary hit radio	Interscope	
Australia	August 9, 2008	CD single	Interscope	
