= New Kids on the Block discography =

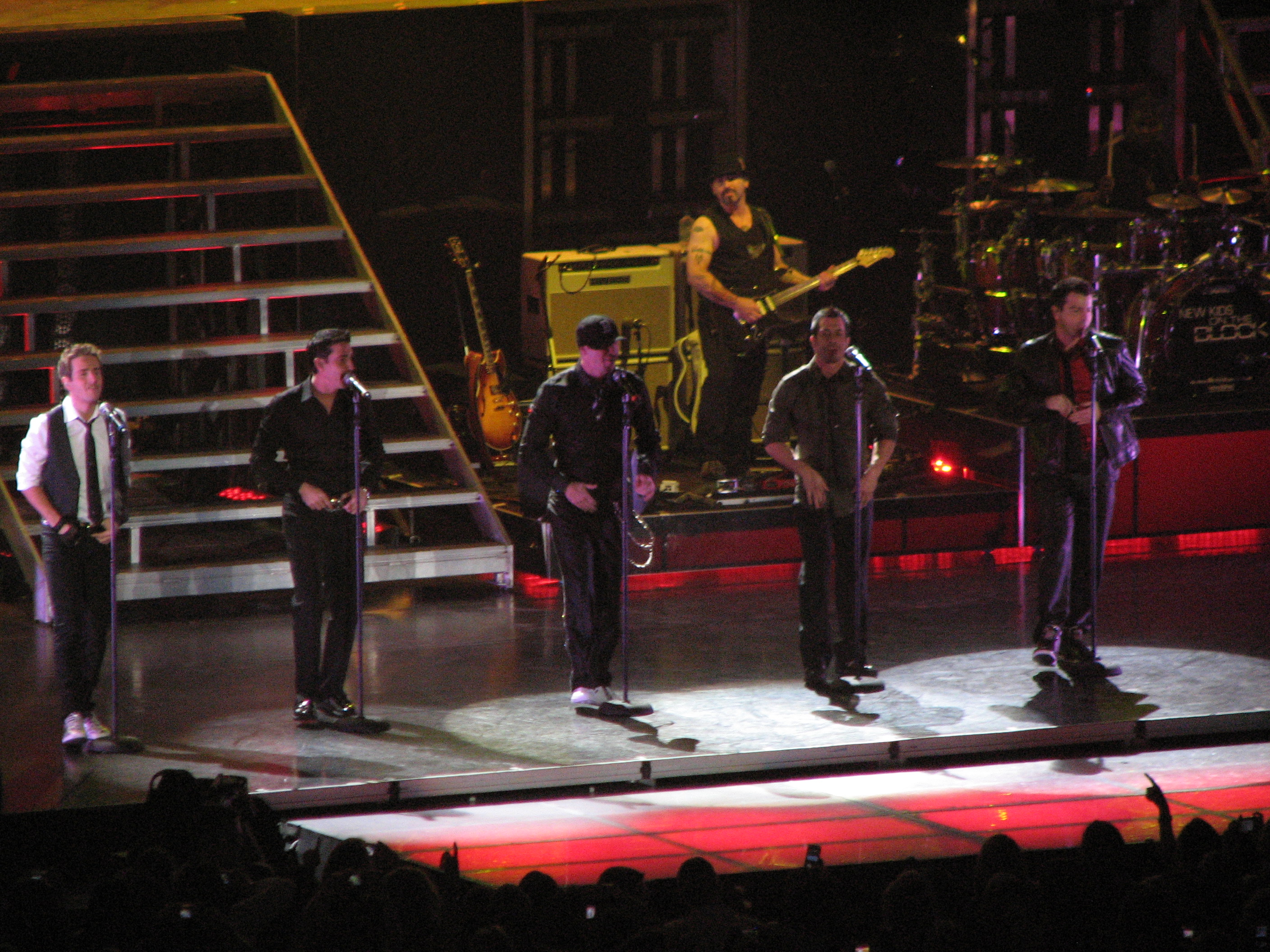
- New Kids on the Block performing in 2008
- Studio albums: 8
- Extended plays: 1
- Compilation albums: 7
- Singles: 32
- Music videos: 26
- DVDs: 4

The American boy band New Kids on the Block has released eight studio albums, seven compilation albums, one EP, thirty-two singles, and five video albums. As of 2005, they had sold more than 17.5 million albums in the United States alone and to date, over 80 million records worldwide.

The New Kids on the Block released their debut single, "Be My Girl", in 1986. It peaked at number 90 on the Hot R&B/Hip-Hop Songs chart. Their first album was released the same year, and although not a big success at the time, it managed to sell three million copies in the United States after almost four years, being certified three times platinum by the RIAA. In 1988, they released their second and most successful album to date, Hangin' Tough, which peaked at number one on the Billboard 200 and sold more than eight million copies in the United States alone. After a Christmas album, they released the song "Step by Step", from the album of the same name; it remains the band's biggest-selling single to date. New Kids on the Block have since released four more studio albums and eight compilations.

== Albums ==
=== Studio albums ===
Title	Album details	Peak chart positions										Certifications (sales thresholds)
Title	Album details	US	AUS	AUT	CAN	GER	NED	NZ	SWE	SWI	UK	Certifications (sales thresholds)
New Kids on the Block	Released: April 1, 1986; Label: Columbia Records	25	146	—	17	—	—	—	—	—	6	US: 3× Platinum; CAN: 3× Platinum; UK: Gold
Hangin' Tough	Released: August 12, 1988; Label: Columbia Records	1	7	8	2	4	33	3	—	19	2	US: 8× Platinum; AUS: 2× Platinum; AUT: Gold; CAN: Diamond; GER: Gold; UK: 2× Platinum
Merry, Merry Christmas	Released: September 19, 1989; Label: Columbia Records	9	34	13	15	30	76	—	43	—	13	US: 2× Platinum; CAN: 2× Platinum; UK: Gold
Step by Step	Released: June 5, 1990; Label: Columbia Records	1	4	6	1	1	11	1	12	8	1	US: 3× Platinum; AUS: Gold; AUT: Platinum; CAN: 7× Platinum; GER: Platinum; SWE: Gold; SWI: Platinum; UK: Platinum
Face the Music	Released: January 25, 1994; Label: Columbia Records	37	18	38	34	44	72	—	46	38	36	
The Block	Released: September 2, 2008; Label: Interscope Records	2	81	69	1	21	—	—	—	73	16	CAN: Gold
10	Released: April 2, 2013; Label: The Block/Boston Five	6	59	—	8	45	39	—	—	—	47	
Still Kids	Released: May 17, 2024; Label: BMG	56	23	—	—	59	—	—	14	—	16	
"—" denotes a recording that did not chart or was not released in that territory.

=== Compilation albums ===
Title	Album details	Peak chart positions										Certifications (sales thresholds)
Title	Album details	US	AUS	AUT	CAN	GER	NED	NZ	SWE	SWI	UK	Certifications (sales thresholds)
No More Games/The Remix Album	Released: November 15, 1990; Label: Columbia	19	34	16	12	40	27	28	41	—	15	US: Gold; AUT: Gold; CAN: 2× Platinum
H.I.T.S.	Released: December 1991; Label: Columbia/Sony	—	13	16	—	26	23	14	34	37	50	AUS: Gold
Greatest Hits	Released: February 1999; Label: Columbia Records/Sony	—	—	—	—	—	—	—	—	—	—	
Super Hits	Released: April 2001; Label: Columbia	—	—	—	—	—	—	—	—	—	—	
Collections	Released: February 8, 2005; Label: Columbia	—	—	—	—	—	—	—	—	—	—	
New Kids on the Block: Greatest Hits	Released: August 2008; Label: Columbia Records/Sony	22	75	—	17	—	—	—	—	—	—	
NKOTBSB (with the Backstreet Boys as NKOTBSB)	Released: May 2011; Label: Columbia Records/Sony/Jive	7	38	—	6	—	—	—	—	—	—	
"—" denotes a recording that did not chart or was not released in that territory.

== EPs ==
Title	EP details	Peak chart positions		
Title	EP details	US	CAN	UK
Thankful	Released: May 12, 2017; Label: NKOTB Music	17	29	82
"—" denotes a recording that did not chart or was not released in that territory.

== Singles ==
Single	Year	Peak chart positions										Certifications	Album
Single	Year	US	US RB/HH	AUS	BEL (FL)	CAN	GER	IRE	NLD	NZ	UK	Certifications	Album
"Be My Girl"	1986	—	90	—	—	—	—	—	—	—	—		New Kids on the Block
"Stop It Girl"	1986	—	—	—	—	—	—	—	—	—	—		New Kids on the Block
"Please Don't Go Girl"	1988	10	55	—	—	77	—	—	—	—	—		Hangin' Tough
"You Got It (The Right Stuff)"	1988	3	28	1	—	36	12	2	32	2	1	US: Gold; AUS: Platinum; UK: Gold	Hangin' Tough
"I'll Be Loving You (Forever)"	1989	1	12	4	19	17	31	2	8	28	5	US: Gold; AUS: Gold	Hangin' Tough
"Hangin' Tough"	1989	1	—	8	32	6	29	1	31	7	1	US: Platinum; AUS: Gold; CAN: Gold	Hangin' Tough
"Cover Girl"	1989	2	—	22	—	4	—	6	—	17	4	US: Gold; CAN: Gold	Hangin' Tough
"Didn't I (Blow Your Mind)" ^{[A]}	1989	8	34	—	—	17	—	6	—	—	8		New Kids on the Block
"This One's for the Children"	1989	7	55	40	40	15	—	7	71	—	9	US: Gold	Merry, Merry Christmas
"Step by Step"	1990	1	48	8	6	1	8	5	13	3	2	US: Platinum; AUS: Gold; CAN: Platinum; UK: Silver	Step by Step
"Valentine Girl"	1990	—	—	—	—	—	—	—	—	—	—		Non-album single
"Tonight"	1990	7	—	16	4	8	19	8	3	16	3		Step by Step
"Let's Try It Again" ^{[A]}	1990	53	—	51	32	60	68	6	17	31	8		Step by Step
"Games" ^{[B]}	1991	—	—	33	39	52	—	9	30	27	14		No More Games: The Remix Album
"Call It What You Want" ^{[B]}	1991	—	—	57	22	—	—	8	17	45	12		No More Games: The Remix Album
"Baby, I Believe in You"	1991	—	—	91	—	—	—	—	64	20	—		No More Games: The Remix Album
"If You Go Away" ^{[B]}	1991	16	—	26	25	6	34	26	10	—	9		Face the Music
"Dirty Dawg" ^{[B]}	1994	66	—	20	—	3	—	—	41	13	27		Face the Music
"Never Let You Go" ^{[B]}	1994	—	—	120	—	18	—	—	—	—	42		Face the Music
"Summertime"	2008	36	—	90	—	9	55	—	—	—	34		The Block
"Single" (with Ne-Yo)	2008	— (Note: "Single" peaked at number 7 on the Billboard Bubbling Under Hot 100 chart, which ranks the top 25 songs that have not yet entered the Billboard Hot 100.)	—	116	—	42	—	—	—	—	81		The Block
"Dirty Dancing"	2008	—	—	—	—	31	23	—	—	—	—		The Block
"2 in the Morning"	2009	—	—	—	—	76	—	—	—	—	—		The Block
"Don't Turn Out the Lights" (as 'NKOTBSB' with Backstreet Boys)	2011	— (Note: "Don't Turn Out the Lights" peaked at number 14 on the Billboard Bubbling Under Hot 100 chart, which ranks the top 25 songs that have not yet entered the Billboard Hot 100.)	—	—	—	46	—	—	—	—	—		NKOTBSB
"Remix (I Like The)"	2013	—	—	—	—	81	—	—	—	—	—		10
"The Whisper"	2013	—	—	—	—	–	—	—	—	—	—		10
"I Need a Melody"	2014	—	—	—	—	—	—	—	—	—	—		Non-album single
"One More Night"	2017	—	—	—	—	—	—	—	—	—	—		Thankful
"Boys in the Band (Boy Band Anthem)"	2019	—	—	—	—	—	—	—	—	—	—		Hangin' Tough (30th Anniversary)
"House Party" (ft. Boyz II Men, Big Freedia, Naughty by Nature, and Jordin Sparks)	2020	— (Note: "House Party" peaked at number 5 on the Billboard Digital Song Sales chart, which is a component chart of the Billboard Hot 100.)	—	—	—	— (Note: "House Party" peaked at number 19 on the Billboard Hot Canadian Digital Song Sales chart, which is a component chart of the Billboard Canadian Hot 100.)	—	—	—	—	— (Note: "House Party" peaked at number 96 on the Official UK Singles Downloads Chart, which is a component chart of the Official UK Singles Chart.)		Non-album singles
"Bring Back the Time" (ft. Salt-N-Pepa, Rick Astley, and En Vogue)	2022	—	—	—	—	—	—	—	—	—	—		Non-album singles
"Kids"	2024	—	—	—	—	—	—	—	—	—	—		Still Kids
"A Love Like This"	2024	—	—	—	—	—	—	—	—	—	—		Still Kids
"—" denotes a recording that did not chart or was not released in that territory.

== Videography ==
=== Home videos ===
Title	Year	Production details	Notes	Certifications
Hangin' Tough	1989	Released: July 25, 1989; Label: Sony Music; Formats: VHS, Laserdisc	Includes behind-the-scenes and four music videos: "Please Don't Go Girl", "You Got It (The Right Stuff)", "I'll Be Loving You (Forever)", and "Hangin' Tough".	RIAA: 11× Platinum; MC: Diamond
Hangin' Tough Live	1989	Released: November 14, 1989; Label: Sony Music; Format: VHS	Includes seven live performances at L.A.'s Mayan Theater show: "My Favourite Girl", "What'cha Gonna Do (About It)", "Please Don't Go Girl", "Cover Girl", "(You've Got It) The Right Stuff", "I'll Be Loving You (Forever)", and "Hangin' Tough".	RIAA: 12× Platinum; MC: Diamond
Step by Step	1990	Released: May 24, 1990; Label: Sony Music; Formats: VHS, Laserdisc	Includes four music videos and three live performances: "Tonight" (video), "This One's for the Children" (video), "Medley: Stop It Girl/Please Don't Go Girl/Be My Girl/I Wanna Be Loved by You", "I'll Be There" (live), "Didn't I (Blow Your Mind)" (live), "Valentine Girl" (video), and "Step By Step" (video).	RIAA: 2× Platinum; MC: Diamond
Greatest Hits: The Videos	1999	Released: 1999; Label: Sony Music; Format: DVD	Includes ten music videos and six live performances: "Step by Step", "You Got It (The Right Stuff)", "I'll Be Loving You (Forever)", "Cover Girl", "Didn't I (Blow Your Mind)" (Live), "Please Don't Go Girl", "Tonight", "This One's for the Children", "Valentine Girl" (Live), "Hangin' Tough", "Baby, I Believe in You" (Live), "Call It What You Want", "If You Go Away", "No More Games" (Live), "Tonight" (Live), "Step by Step" (Live)	
New Kids on the Block: Coming Home	2010	Released: February 2, 2010; Label: RED Distribution DVD; Format: DVD	Documentary about the 2009 world tour, New Kids on the Block Live.	
New Kids on the Block: Live from Fenway Park	2013	Released: 2013		

=== Music videos ===
Title	Year	Director(s)
"Please Don't Go Girl" (version 1)	1988	
"Please Don't Go Girl" (version 2)	1988	Doug Nichol
"You Got It (The Right Stuff)"	1988	Doug Nichol
"I'll Be Loving You (Forever)"	1989	Doug Nichol
"Hangin' Tough"	1989	Doug Nichol
"Cover Girl"	1989	Doug Nichol
"This One's for the Children"	1989	Doug Nichol
"Step by Step"	1990	Larry Jordan
"Tonight"	1990	Larry Jordan
"Games"	1990	Jim Yukich
"Call It What You Want"	1991	Tamra Davis
"If You Go Away"	1991	Matt Mahurin
"Dirty Dawg"	1993	Scott Kalvert
"Never Let You Go"	1994	Matthew Rolston
"Summertime"	2008	Thomas Kloss and Donnie Wahlberg
"Single"	2008	Benny Boom
"Dirty Dancing"	2008	Til Schweiger
"2 in the Morning"	2009	Meiert Avis
"Remix (I Like The)"	2013	Rami Hachache
"The Whisper"	2013	
"I Need a Melody"	2014	
"One More Night"	2017	
"Boys in the Band"	2019	
"80s Baby"	2019	
"House Party"	2020	
"Bring Back the Time"	2022	John Asher
"Kids"	2024	Marissa Velez

- "Tonight" was also released in a black-and-white version. "Dirty Dawg" was also released with the "Dance Mix" version.

== Notes ==
=== Releases ===
- A Charted as "Let's Try Again"/"Didn't I Blow Your Mind" in the UK and Ireland in October 1990.
- B Credited to NKOTB
