= The Magic Summer Tour =

1990–92 concert tour by New Kids on the Block

Magic Summer Tour
- Tour by New Kids on the Block
- Promotional poster for the tour
- Associated albums: Step by Step; No More Games: The Remix Album
- Start date: April 25, 1990
- End date: February 21, 1992
- Legs: 9
- No. of shows: 220

New Kids on the Block concert chronology
- Hangin' Tough Tour (1988–90); Magic Summer Tour (1990–92); Face the Music Tour (1994)

The Magic Summer Tour was the second major concert tour by American boy band New Kids on the Block. The tour supported their fourth studio album, Step by Step (1990) and their first compilation album, No More Games/The Remix Album (1990).

The tour began only one month after their previous concluded. After the summer leg ended, the tour shifted gears and was renamed the "No More Games Tour", following the announcement of their remix album. Lasting 22 months, the group played over 220 concerts in Europe, North America, Asia, Australia and South America.

== Background ==
The 1990 summer tour was sponsored by Coca-Cola and tied into its "Magic Summer '90" campaign that included the infamous MagiCan.

The tour was a commercial success. Both stints in North America landed the group in the top 10 tours in 1990 and 1991. In 1990, the group earned $74.1 million from 152 shows in North America (25 of which were performed during their previous tour). In January 22nd, 1991, the group headlined the Rock in Rio Festival fourth night in Rio de Janeiro, Brazil, at Maracanã Stadium, for a crowd of over 100.000 attendance.

During an encore performance of "Hangin' Tough" at the end of the second concert held at Saratoga Springs on June 25, Donnie Wahlberg fell through a trap door while jumping off a raised platform. He received scrapes and bruises to his chest, neck, and arms. After being hospitalized for a night, he spent a week recuperating, and the rest of the band continued the next few concerts as a four-piece act.

== Opening acts ==
- Perfect Gentlemen (North America, select dates)
- Rick Wes (North America, Leg 1)
- Tommy Page (North America, Leg 1)
- Biscuit (North America, Leg 2)
- Brenda K. Starr (North America, Leg 2, select dates)
- George Lamond (North America, Leg 2, select dates)
- The Good Girls (North America, Leg 2, select dates)
- The Osmonds Second Generation (North America, dates unknown)

== Setlist ==
1. "Call It What You Want"
2. "My Favorite Girl"
3. "Valentine Girl"
4. "Didn't I (Blow Your Mind This Time)" (Europe and North America's first leg only)
5. "You Got It (The Right Stuff)"
6. "Baby, I Believe in You"
7. "Cover Girl"
8. "Let's Try It Again"
9. "Stay With Me Baby"
10. Joey Medley:
  1. "I Remember When"
  2. "Angel"
  3. "Please Don't Go Girl"
  4. "Where Do I Go from Here?"
11. "Treat Me Right"
12. "Never Gonna Fall in Love Again"
13. "Funny Feeling"
14. "I'll Be Loving You (Forever)"
15. "Games"
16. "Tonight"
17. "Step By Step"
18. "This One's for the Children"
19. "Hangin' Tough"

Notes: • "Didn't I (Blow Your Mind This Time)" was performed as the third song in the setlist instead of Valentine Girl during the 1990 European dates of the tour

• "Funny Feeling" was occasionally taken out of the setlist for unknown reasons and "I'll Be Loving You (Forever) was performed instead.

• There were shows where the spot in the set list that held both "Funny Feeling" or "I'll Be Loving You (Forever) (depending on the show) were taken off the set list completely and "Games" would be performed right after "Never Gonna Fall in Love Again".

• At select shows in Japan, a rendition of the Jackson 5 song "I'll Be There" was performed during the set list.

== Tour dates ==
Magic Summer Tour

Date	City	Country	Venue
Europe
April 25, 1990	Edinburgh	Scotland	Edinburgh Playhouse
April 26, 1990	Manchester	England	Manchester Apollo
April 27, 1990	Whitley Bay	England	Whitley Bay Ice Rink
April 28, 1990	Whitley Bay	England	Whitley Bay Ice Rink
April 29, 1990	Brighton	England	Brighton Centre
May 3, 1990	Hamburg	West Germany	Alsterdorfer Sporthalle
May 4, 1990	Frankfurt	West Germany	Festhalle
May 5, 1990	Munich	West Germany	Olympiahalle
May 6, 1990	Essen	West Germany	Grugahalle
May 8, 1990	Birmingham	England	NEC Arena
May 9, 1990	Birmingham	England	NEC Arena
May 11, 1990	London	England	Docklands Arena
May 12, 1990	London	England	Docklands Arena
May 13, 1990	London	England	Docklands Arena
North America
June 23, 1990	Lake Placid	United States	Olympic Center Ice Rink
June 24, 1990	Saratoga Springs	United States	Saratoga Raceway
June 25, 1990	Saratoga Springs	United States	Saratoga Raceway
June 26, 1990	Auburn Hills	United States	The Palace of Auburn Hills
June 27, 1990	Auburn Hills	United States	The Palace of Auburn Hills
June 28, 1990	Hoffman Estates	United States	Poplar Creek Music Theater
June 29, 1990	Hoffman Estates	United States	Poplar Creek Music Theater
June 30, 1990	East Troy	United States	Alpine Valley Music Theatre
July 1, 1990	East Troy	United States	Alpine Valley Music Theatre
July 4, 1990	Saint Paul	United States	Harriet Island
July 5, 1990	Bonner Springs	United States	Sandstone Center for the Performing Arts
July 6, 1990	Iowa City	United States	Carver–Hawkeye Arena
July 7, 1990	Noblesville	United States	Deer Creek Music Center
July 8, 1990	Noblesville	United States	Deer Creek Music Center
July 10, 1990	Cincinnati	United States	Riverfront Stadium
July 11, 1990	Cuyahoga Falls	United States	Blossom Music Center
July 12, 1990	Cuyahoga Falls	United States	Blossom Music Center
July 13, 1990	Burgettstown	United States	Coca-Cola Star Lake Amphitheater
July 14, 1990	Burgettstown	United States	Coca-Cola Star Lake Amphitheater
July 17, 1990	Washington, D.C.	United States	RFK Stadium
July 20, 1990	East Rutherford	United States	Giants Stadium
July 21, 1990	East Rutherford	United States	Giants Stadium
July 22, 1990	Wantagh	United States	Jones Beach Marine Theater
July 23, 1990	Wantagh	United States	Jones Beach Marine Theater
July 26, 1990	Old Orchard Beach	United States	Seashore Performing Arts Center
July 27, 1990	Bristol	United States	Lake Compounce Amphitheater
July 28, 1990	Bristol	United States	Lake Compounce Amphitheater
July 29, 1990	Foxborough	United States	Foxboro Stadium
July 31, 1990	Foxborough	United States	Foxboro Stadium
August 3, 1990	Toronto	Canada	CNE Grandstand
August 4, 1990	Montreal	Canada	Olympic Stadium
August 5, 1990	Ottawa	Canada	Lansdowne Park
August 8, 1990	Atlanta	United States	Bobby Dodd Stadium
August 9, 1990	Charlotte	United States	American Legion Memorial Stadium
August 10, 1990	Tallahassee	United States	Tallahassee-Leon County Civic Center
August 11, 1990	St. Petersburg	United States	Florida Suncoast Dome
August 12, 1990	Miami Gardens	United States	Joe Robbie Stadium
August 14, 1990	Greenville	United States	Paladin Stadium
August 15, 1990	Winston-Salem	United States	Groves Stadium
August 16, 1990	Nashville	United States	Starwood Amphitheatre
August 17, 1990	Knoxville	United States	Thompson–Boling Arena
August 19, 1990	Irving	United States	Texas Stadium
August 20, 1990	Houston	United States	Astrodome
August 22, 1990	Pensacola	United States	Pensacola Civic Center
August 23, 1990	New Orleans	United States	Louisiana Superdome
August 24, 1990	Shreveport	United States	Independence Stadium
August 25, 1990	Jackson	United States	Mississippi Veterans Memorial Stadium
August 26, 1990	St. Louis	United States	Busch Stadium
August 28, 1990	Tulsa	United States	Skelly Stadium
August 30, 1990	Greenwood Village	United States	Fiddler's Green Amphitheatre
September 2, 1990	Provo	United States	Marriott Center
September 5, 1990	Vancouver	Canada	BC Place
September 6, 1990	Seattle	United States	Kingdome
September 8, 1990	Oakland	United States	Oakland–Alameda County Coliseum
September 9, 1990	Mountain View	United States	Shoreline Amphitheatre
September 12, 1990	Costa Mesa	United States	Pacific Amphitheatre
September 13, 1990	Costa Mesa	United States	Pacific Amphitheatre
September 14, 1990	Los Angeles	United States	Dodger Stadium
September 15, 1990	Las Vegas	United States	Thomas & Mack Center
September 16, 1990	Chandler	United States	Compton Terrace

No More Games Tour

Date	City	Country	Venue
North America
October 31, 1990	Calgary	Canada	Olympic Saddledome
November 2, 1990	Edmonton	Canada	Northlands Coliseum
November 3, 1990	Saskatoon	Canada	Saskatchewan Place
November 4, 1990	Winnipeg	Canada	Winnipeg Arena
November 7, 1990	Indianapolis	United States	Market Square Arena
November 8, 1990	Champaign	United States	Assembly Hall
November 9, 1990	Milwaukee	United States	Bradley Center
November 10, 1990	Bloomington	United States	Met Center
November 11, 1990	Ames	United States	Hilton Coliseum
November 14, 1990	Rosemont	United States	Rosemont Horizon
November 15, 1990	Detroit	United States	Joe Louis Arena
November 16, 1990	Detroit	United States	Joe Louis Arena
November 17, 1990	Detroit	United States	Joe Louis Arena
November 18, 1990	Detroit	United States	Joe Louis Arena
November 20, 1990	Uniondale	United States	Nassau Veterans Memorial Coliseum
November 21, 1990	Uniondale	United States	Nassau Veterans Memorial Coliseum
November 23, 1990	Pittsburgh	United States	Civic Arena
November 24, 1990	Syracuse	United States	Carrier Dome
November 25, 1990	Richfield Township	United States	The Coliseum at Richfield
November 26, 1990	Richfield Township	United States	The Coliseum at Richfield
November 29, 1990	Atlanta	United States	Omni Coliseum
November 30, 1990	Knoxville	United States	Thompson–Boling Arena
December 1, 1990	Birmingham	United States	BJCC Coliseum
December 2, 1990	Cincinnati	United States	Riverfront Coliseum
December 6, 1990	Providence	United States	Providence Civic Center
December 7, 1990	Providence	United States	Providence Civic Center
December 8, 1990	Toronto	Canada	Skydome
December 9, 1990	Philadelphia	United States	Spectrum
December 10, 1990	Philadelphia	United States	Spectrum
December 11, 1990	Philadelphia	United States	Spectrum
December 13, 1990	Toronto	Canada	Skydome
December 14, 1990	Worcester	United States	The Centrum in Worcester
December 15, 1990	Worcester	United States	The Centrum in Worcester
December 16, 1990	Worcester	United States	The Centrum in Worcester
December 20, 1990	Uniondale	United States	Nassau Veterans Memorial Coliseum
December 21, 1990	Uniondale	United States	Nassau Veterans Memorial Coliseum
South America
January 22, 1991	Rio de Janeiro	Brazil	Maracanã Stadium
Asia
January 31, 1991	Tokyo	Japan	Tokyo Dome
February 1, 1991	Tokyo	Japan	Tokyo Dome
February 3, 1991	Osaka	Japan	Osaka-jō Hall
February 4, 1991	Nagoya	Japan	Nagoya Rainbow Hall
North America
February 10, 1991	Honolulu	United States	Blaisdell Arena
February 13, 1991	Tacoma	United States	Tacoma Dome
February 14, 1991	Portland	United States	Memorial Coliseum
February 15, 1991	Vancouver	United States	Pacific Coliseum
February 16, 1991	Pullman	United States	Beasley Coliseum
February 17, 1991	Boise	United States	BSU Pavilion
February 19, 1991	Daly City	United States	Cow Palace
February 20, 1991	Fresno	United States	Selland Arena
February 22, 1991	Reno	United States	Lawlor Events Center
February 23, 1991	Oakland	United States	Oakland–Alameda County Coliseum Arena
February 24, 1991	Oakland	United States	Oakland–Alameda County Coliseum Arena
February 25, 1991	Sacramento	United States	ARCO Arena
March 1, 1991	El Paso	United States	UTEP Special Events Center
March 2, 1991	Albuquerque	United States	Tingley Coliseum
March 3, 1991	Lubbock	United States	Lubbock Municipal Coliseum
March 6, 1991	Valley Center	United States	Britt Brown Arena
March 7, 1991	Valley Center	United States	Britt Brown Arena
March 8, 1991	Oklahoma City	United States	MCC Arena
March 9, 1991	Little Rock	United States	Barton Coliseum
March 10, 1991	Shreveport	United States	Hirsch Memorial Coliseum
March 13, 1991	San Antonio	United States	Hemisfair Arena
March 14, 1991	Austin	United States	Frank Erwin Center
March 15, 1991	Houston	United States	The Summit
March 16, 1991	Baton Rouge	United States	Riverside Centroplex Arena
March 17, 1991	Biloxi	United States	Mississippi Coast Coliseum
March 20, 1991	Orlando	United States	Orlando Arena
March 21, 1991	Jacksonville	United States	Jacksonville Veterans Memorial Coliseum
March 23, 1991	Auburn	United States	Beard–Eaves–Memorial Coliseum
March 24, 1991	Huntsville	United States	Von Braun Civic Center Arena
March 27, 1991	Louisville	United States	Freedom Hall
March 28, 1991	Wheeling	United States	Wheeling Civic Center
March 29, 1991	Raleigh	United States	Reynolds Coliseum
March 30, 1991	Norfolk	United States	Norfolk Scope Arena
March 31, 1991	Norfolk	United States	Norfolk Scope Arena
April 3, 1991	Peoria	United States	Peoria Civic Center Arena
April 4, 1991	Rockford	United States	Rockford MetroCentre
April 5, 1991	Columbia	United States	Hearnes Center
April 7, 1991	Notre Dame	United States	Joyce Athletic & Convocation Center
April 8, 1991	East Lansing	United States	Breslin Student Events Center
April 9, 1991	Detroit	United States	Joe Louis Arena
April 10, 1991	Ann Arbor	United States	Crisler Center
April 11, 1991	Kalamazoo	United States	Wings Stadium
April 13, 1991	Saginaw	United States	Wendler Arena
Europe
April 23, 1991	Berlin	Germany	Deutschlandhalle
April 24, 1991	Bremen	Germany	Stadthalle Bremen
April 26, 1991	Stockholm	Sweden	Stockholm Globe Arena
April 27, 1991	Kiel	Germany	Ostseehalle
April 28, 1991	Frankfurt	Germany	Festhalle Frankfurt
April 29, 1991	Brussels	Belgium	Forest National
May 1, 1991	Munich	Germany	Olympiahalle
May 2, 1991	Hamburg	Germany	Alsterdorfer Sporthalle
May 3, 1991	Paris	France	Zénith de Paris
May 5, 1991	Nuremberg	Germany	Frankenhalle
May 6, 1991	Zürich	Switzerland	Hallenstadion
May 7, 1991	Mannheim	Germany	Eisstadion
May 8, 1991	Stuttgart	Germany	Hanns-Martin-Schleyer-Halle
May 10, 1991	Cologne	Germany	Sporthalle Köln
May 11, 1991	Dortmund	Germany	Westfalenhallen
May 12, 1991	Rotterdam	Netherlands	Sportpaleis van Ahoy
May 14, 1991	London	England	Wembley Arena
May 15, 1991	London	England	Wembley Arena
May 16, 1991	London	England	Wembley Arena
May 18, 1991	London	England	Wembley Arena
May 19, 1991	London	England	Wembley Arena
May 20, 1991	London	England	Wembley Arena
May 23, 1991	Birmingham	England	NEC Arena
May 24, 1991	Birmingham	England	NEC Arena
May 25, 1991	Birmingham	England	NEC Arena
May 26, 1991	Birmingham	England	NEC Arena
May 27, 1991	Birmingham	England	NEC Arena
May 30, 1991	Manchester	England	GMEX
May 31, 1991	Manchester	England	GMEX
June 1, 1991	Manchester	England	GMEX
October 30, 1991	Copenhagen	Denmark	Forum Copenhagen
November 1, 1991	Stockholm	Sweden	Stockholm Globe Arena
November 2, 1991	Gothenburg	Sweden	Scandinavium
November 4, 1991	Helsinki	Finland	Helsinki Ice Hall
November 6, 1991	Oslo	Norway	Oslo Spektrum
November 7, 1991	Oslo	Norway	Oslo Spektrum
November 11, 1991	Forest	Belgium	Forest National
November 12, 1991	Forest	Belgium	Forest National
November 16, 1991	Memmingen	Germany	Eissporthalle
November 17, 1991	Essen	Germany	Grugahalle
November 19, 1991	Kiel	Germany	Ostseehalle
November 21, 1991	Cologne	Germany	Sporthalle Köln
November 23, 1991	Frankfurt	Germany	Festhalle
November 25, 1991	Hanover	Germany	Eilenriedehalle
November 30, 1991	Vienna	Austria	Wiener Stadthalle
December 2, 1991	Manchester	England	GMEX
December 3, 1991	Manchester	England	GMEX
December 5, 1991	London	England	Wembley Arena
December 6, 1991	Sheffield	England	Sheffield Arena
December 7, 1991	Glasgow	Scotland	SECC Concert Hall 4
December 8, 1991	Glasgow	Scotland	SECC Concert Hall 4
December 11, 1991	Dublin	Ireland	Point Theatre
December 12, 1991	Dublin	Ireland	Point Theatre
December 14, 1991	Birmingham	England	NEC Arena
December 15, 1991	Birmingham	England	NEC Arena
North America
January 15, 1992	Mexico City	Mexico	Palacio de los Deportes
January 16, 1992	Mexico City	Mexico	Palacio de los Deportes
January 17, 1992	Mexico City	Mexico	Palacio de los Deportes
Australasia
January 25, 1992	Auckland	New Zealand	Ericsson Stadium
January 28, 1992	Sydney	Australia	Sydney Entertainment Centre
January 29, 1992	Sydney	Australia	Sydney Entertainment Centre
February 1, 1992	Melbourne	Australia	National Tennis Centre
February 4, 1992	Adelaide	Australia	Adelaide Entertainment Centre
February 6, 1992	Brisbane	Australia	Brisbane Entertainment Centre
Asia
February 8, 1992	Kallang	Singapore	Singapore Indoor Stadium
February 9, 1992	Kallang	Singapore	Singapore Indoor Stadium
February 11, 1992	Jakarta	Indonesia	Istora Senayan
February 12, 1992	Jakarta	Indonesia	Istora Senayan
February 13, 1992	Jakarta	Indonesia	Istora Senayan
February 15, 1992	Manila	Philippines	Rizal Memorial Stadium
February 17, 1992	Seoul	South Korea	Olympic Gymnastics Arena
February 20, 1992	Yokohama	Japan	Yokohama Arena
February 21, 1992	Yokohama	Japan	Yokohama Arena
February 22, 1992 (2 Times)	Yokohama	Japan	Yokohama Arena
February 24, 1992	Nagoya	Japan	Nagoya Rainbow Hall
February 25, 1992	Kobe	Japan	Kobe World Memorial Hall

=== Box office score data ===
Venue	City	Tickets sold / Available	Gross revenue
Olympic Center Ice Rink	Lake Placid	10,084 / 11,000 (92%)	$196,638
The Palace of Auburn Hills	Auburn Hills	41,691 / 41,691 (100%)	$771,284
Alpine Valley Music Theatre	East Troy	70,029 / 80,000 (88%)	$1,395,607
Harriet Island	Saint Paul	29,611 / 29,611 (100%)	$593,930
Sandstone Center for the Performing Arts	Bonner Springs	18,000 / 18,000 (100%)	$355,282
Riverfront Stadium	Cincinnati	48,450 / 48,450 (100%)	$1,102,420
Giants Stadium	East Rutherford	104,218 / 104,218 (100%)	$2,542,125
Jones Beach Marine Theater	Wantagh	20,200 / 20,200 (100%)	$575,700
Seashore Performing Arts Center	Old Orchard Beach	15,000 / 15,000 (100%)	$360,000
Lake Compounce Amphitheater	Bristol	40,000 / 40,000 (100%)	$1,141,365
Thompson–Boling Arena	Knoxville	47,785 / 47,785 (100%)	$1,112,290
American Legion Memorial Stadium	Charlotte	27,268 / 27,268 (100%)	$661,100
Paladin Stadium	Greenville	27,328 / 27,328 (100%)	$669,775
Groves Stadium	Winston-Salem	21,032 / 25,000 (84%)	$491,300
Astrodome	Houston	45,898 / 45,898 (100%)	$1,085,675
Louisiana Superdome	New Orleans	39,658 / 50,000 (79%)	$752,280
Independence Stadium	Shreveport	26,727 / 26,727 (100%)	$586,395
Mississippi Veterans Memorial Stadium	Jackson	35,101 / 35,101 (100%)	$771,368
Skelly Stadium	Tulsa	30,523 / 30,523 (100%)	$741,875
Busch Stadium	St. Louis	50,697 / 50,697 (100%)	$1,143,675
BC Place	Vancouver	34,201 / 34,201 (100%)	$859,733
Kingdome	Seattle	42,929 / 52,619 (82%)	$1,015,300
Oakland–Alameda County Coliseum	Oakland	54,267 / 54,267 (100%)	$1,356,675
Shoreline Amphitheatre	Mountain View	20,000 / 20,000 (100%)	$496,188
Thomas & Mack Center	Las Vegas	14,189 / 14,189 (100%)	$332,925
Dodger Stadium	Los Angeles	55,003 / 55,003 (100%)	$1,276,825
Pacific Amphitheatre	Costa Mesa	37,637 / 37,637 (100%)	$794,819
Compton Terrace	Chandler	22,886 / 22,886 (100%)	$554,987
Olympic Saddledome	Calgary	29,251 / 34,958 (84%)	$829,849
Saskatchewan Place	Saskatoon	13,612 / 13,612 (100%)	$403,448
Bradley Center	Milwaukee	17,900 / 17,900 (100%)	$437,850
Market Square Arena	Indianapolis	14,443 / 14,443 (100%)	$361,075
Assembly Hall	Champaign	15,125 / 15,125 (100%)	$378,125
Target Center	Minneapolis	16,216 / 16,216 (100%)	$405,400
Hilton Coliseum	Ames	13,326 / 13,326 (100%)	$333,150
Joe Louis Arena	Detroit	97,369 / 102,369 (95%)	$2,434,225
Rosemont Horizon	Rosemont	17,423 / 17,423 (100%)	$426,250
Civic Arena	Pittsburgh	16,566 / 16,566 (100%)	$437,310
Nassau Veterans Memorial Coliseum	Uniondale	33,962 / 33,962 (100%)	$804,800
The Coliseum at Richfield	Richfield Township	35,696 / 35,696 (100%)	$892,400
Carrier Dome	Syracuse	37,997 / 37,997 (100%)	$932,325
Omni Coliseum	Atlanta	12,729 / 16,000 (80%)	$330,954
Providence Civic Center	Providence	29,000 / 29,000 (100%)	$725,000
Skydome	Toronto	95,668 / 95,668 (100%)	$2,433,467
Spectrum	Philadelphia	54,172 / 54,172 (100%)	$1,422,387
The Centrum in Worcester	Worcester	40,377 / 40,377 (100%)	$1,009,425
BJCC Coliseum	Birmingham	16,183 / 16,183 (100%)	$404,575
Beasley Coliseum	Pullman	8,120 / 8,120 (100%)	$195,020
BSU Pavilion	Boise	9,356 / 9,356 (100%)	$226,104
Blaisdell Arena	Honolulu	8,212 / 8,212 (100%)	$205,300
Tacoma Dome	Tacoma	20,654 / 20,654 (100%)	$516,350
Memorial Coliseum	Portland	11,845 / 11,845 (100%)	$296,125
Cow Palace	Daly City	10,121 / 13,000 (78%)	$253,025
Selland Arena	Fresno	10,102 / 10,102 (100%)	$242,837
Lawlor Events Center	Reno	9,283 / 11,000 (84%)	$232,075
Oakland–Alameda County Coliseum Arena	Oakland	28,520 / 28,520 (100%)	$713,000
ARCO Arena	Sacramento	15,553 / 15,553 (100%)	$388,825
UTEP Special Events Center	El Paso	11,371 / 11,371 (100%)	$280,625
Lubbock Municipal Coliseum	Lubbock	8,371 / 8,371 (100%)	$201,371
Barton Coliseum	Little Rock	8,917 / 8,917 (100%)	$218,200
Hirsch Memorial Coliseum	Shreveport	8,701 / 8,701 (100%)	$210,700
Tingley Coliseum	Albuquerque	9,851 / 9,851 (100%)	$240,475
Britt Brown Arena	Valley Center	21,009 / 21,009 (100%)	$518,029
MCC Arena	Oklahoma City	10,615 / 10,615 (100%)	$265,375
Hemisfair Arena	San Antonio	14,134 / 14,134 (100%)	$328,350
Frank Erwin Center	Austin	13,343 / 16,799 (79%)	$322,050
The Summit	Houston	15,951 / 15,951 (100%)	$386,300
Riverside Centroplex Arena	Baton Rouge	10,333 / 10,333 (100%)	$250,075
Mississippi Coast Coliseum	Biloxi	10,143 / 10,143 (100%)	$247,750
Orlando Arena	Orlando	14,068 / 14,068 (100%)	$351,700
Jacksonville Veterans Memorial Coliseum	Jacksonville	9,782 / 9,782 (100%)	$244,550
Beard–Eaves–Memorial Coliseum	Auburn	11,229 / 11,229 (100%)	$271,300
Von Braun Civic Center Arena	Huntsville	7,878 / 7,878 (100%)	$192,475
Reynolds Coliseum	Raleigh	10,313 / 10,313 (100%)	$245,750
Norfolk Scope Arena	Norfolk	20,032 / 20,032 (100%)	$487,450
Freedom Hall	Louisville	15,449 / 15,449 (100%)	$386,225
Wheeling Civic Center	Wheeling	7,634 / 7,634 (100%)	$209,935
Peoria Civic Center Arena	Peoria	10,729 / 10,729 (100%)	$268,225
Rockford MetroCentre	Rockford	9,062 / 9,062 (100%)	$226,550
Hearnes Center	Columbia	7,806 / 7,806 (100%)	$195,150
Joyce Athletic & Convocation Center	Notre Dame	10,523 / 10,523 (100%)	$236,075
Breslin Student Events Center	East Lansing	13,154 / 13,154 (100%)	$328,850
Frankenhalle	Nuremberg	8,222 / 8,222 (100%)	$184,229
Hallenstadion	Zürich	12,791 / 12,791 (100%)	$201,014
Eisstadion	Mannheim	7,944 / 7,944 (100%)	$177,439
Hanns-Martin-Schleyer-Halle	Stuttgart	12,678 / 12,678 (100%)	$276,390
Westfalenhalle	Dortmund	14,475 / 14,475 (100%)	$303,092
Lahti Stadium	Lahti	29,997 / 29,997 (100%)	$767,553
Sportpaleis van Ahoy	Rotterdam	11,045 / 11,045 (100%)	$209,941
Wembley Arena	London	104,844 / 104,844 (100%)	$2,618,304
NEC Arena	Birmingham	59,907 / 59,907 (100%)	$1,619,883
Palacio de los Deportes	Mexico City	52,826 / 60,000 (88%)	$1,408,081
Sydney Entertainment Centre	Sydney	18,603 / 21,588 (86%)	$527,610
TOTAL		2,392,923 / 2,459,999 (97%)	$57,815,283

== See also ==
- List of highest-grossing concert tours
