= Greatest Hits (New Kids on the Block album) =

New Kids on the Block - Greatest Hits

Greatest hits album by New Kids on the Block
- Released: February 16, 1999
- Recorded: 1985–1993
- Genres: Pop, R&B
- Length: 59:23 (original); 78:37 (re-release)
- Labels: Columbia (original); Legacy (re-release)
- Producer: Maurice Starr

New Kids on the Block chronology
Face the Music (1994)	New Kids on the Block - Greatest Hits (1999)	The Block (2008)

New Kids on the Block: Greatest Hits
- 2008 edition cover

Professional ratings
Review scores
Source	Rating
Entertainment Weekly	C
Robert Christgau	(choice cut)

Greatest Hits is the second greatest hits album by New Kids on the Block, and their seventh altogether. It was originally released on February 16, 1999, with hits from previous albums. On August 12, 2008, a new edition of Greatest Hits was released. This was the fourth hits album from the band featuring a new track list (18 in total).

== Track listing ==
=== 1999 edition ===
No.	Title	Lead vocals	Length
1.	"Step by Step" (from Step by Step)	Jordan Knight	4:25
2.	"You Got It (The Right Stuff)" (from Hangin' Tough)	Knight, Donnie Wahlberg	4:08
3.	"I'll Be Loving You (Forever)" (from Hangin' Tough)	Knight	4:19
4.	"Cover Girl" (from Hangin' Tough)	Wahlberg	4:04
5.	"Didn't I (Blow Your Mind)" (from New Kids on the Block)	Knight	4:22
6.	"Please Don't Go Girl" (from Hangin' Tough)	Joey McIntyre, Jordan Knight	4:12
7.	"Tonight" (from Step by Step)	New Kids on the Block	3:24
8.	"This One's for the Children" (from Merry, Merry Christmas)	Knight, Wahlberg	3:53
9.	"Valentine Girl" (Step by Step B-side)	Danny Wood, Knight	3:53
10.	"Let's Try It Again" (from Step by Step)	Wood, Knight	3:47
11.	"Hangin' Tough" (from Hangin' Tough)	Wahlberg	3:48
12.	"If You Go Away" (from Face the Music)	Knight, McIntyre	3:54
13.	"Baby, I Believe in You" (from Step by Step)	Knight	4:37
14.	"Call It What You Want" (The C&C Pump-It Mix); from No More Games/The Remix Album)	Knight, McIntyre, Wahlberg	6:30
Total length:			59:23

=== New Kids on the Block: Greatest Hits (2008 edition) ===
1. "Step by Step" – 4:29
2. "You Got It (The Right Stuff)" – 4:13
3. "I'll Be Loving You (Forever)" – 4:28
4. "Cover Girl" – 4:10
5. "Didn't I (Blow Your Mind)" – 4:22
6. "Please Don't Go Girl" – 4:13
7. "Tonight" – 3:29
8. "Valentine Girl" – 4:02
9. "Let's Try It Again" – 3:53
10. "Hangin' Tough" – 3:54
11. "If You Go Away" – 4:03
12. "Baby, I Believe in You" – 4:33
13. "Games" (The Kids Get Hard Mix) – 5:24
14. "My Favorite Girl" – 5:30
15. "The Right Combination" (Seiko with Wahlberg) – 4:28
16. "Angel of Love" (Ana with Knight) – 4:21
17. "Stay the Same" (McIntyre) – 3:49
18. "2008 New Kids on the Block Mega Mix" – 5:01

=== Walmart collector's fan pack ===
Walmart sold a limited edition "fan pack" containing the 2008 re-release of the Greatest Hits album above with the Greatest Hits: The Videos DVD.

==== Greatest Hits: The Videos DVD ====
1. Program Start
2. "Step by Step"
3. "You Got It (The Right Stuff)"
4. "I'll Be Loving You (Forever)"
5. "Cover Girl"
6. "Didn't I (Blow Your Mind)" (live)
7. "Please Don't Go Girl"
8. "Tonight"
9. "This One's for the Children"
10. "Valentine Girl" (live)
11. "Hangin' Tough"
12. "Baby, I Believe in You" (live)
13. "Call It What You Want"
14. "If You Go Away"
15. "No More Games" (live)
16. "Tonight" (live)
17. "Step by Step" (live)
18. End Credits

== Charts ==
Chart performance for Greatest Hits
Chart (2008–2011)	Peak position
Australian Albums (ARIA)	75
Canadian Albums (Billboard)	17
US Billboard 200	22
