= New Kids on the Block Live =

2008–10 concert tour

- Tour by New Kids on the Block
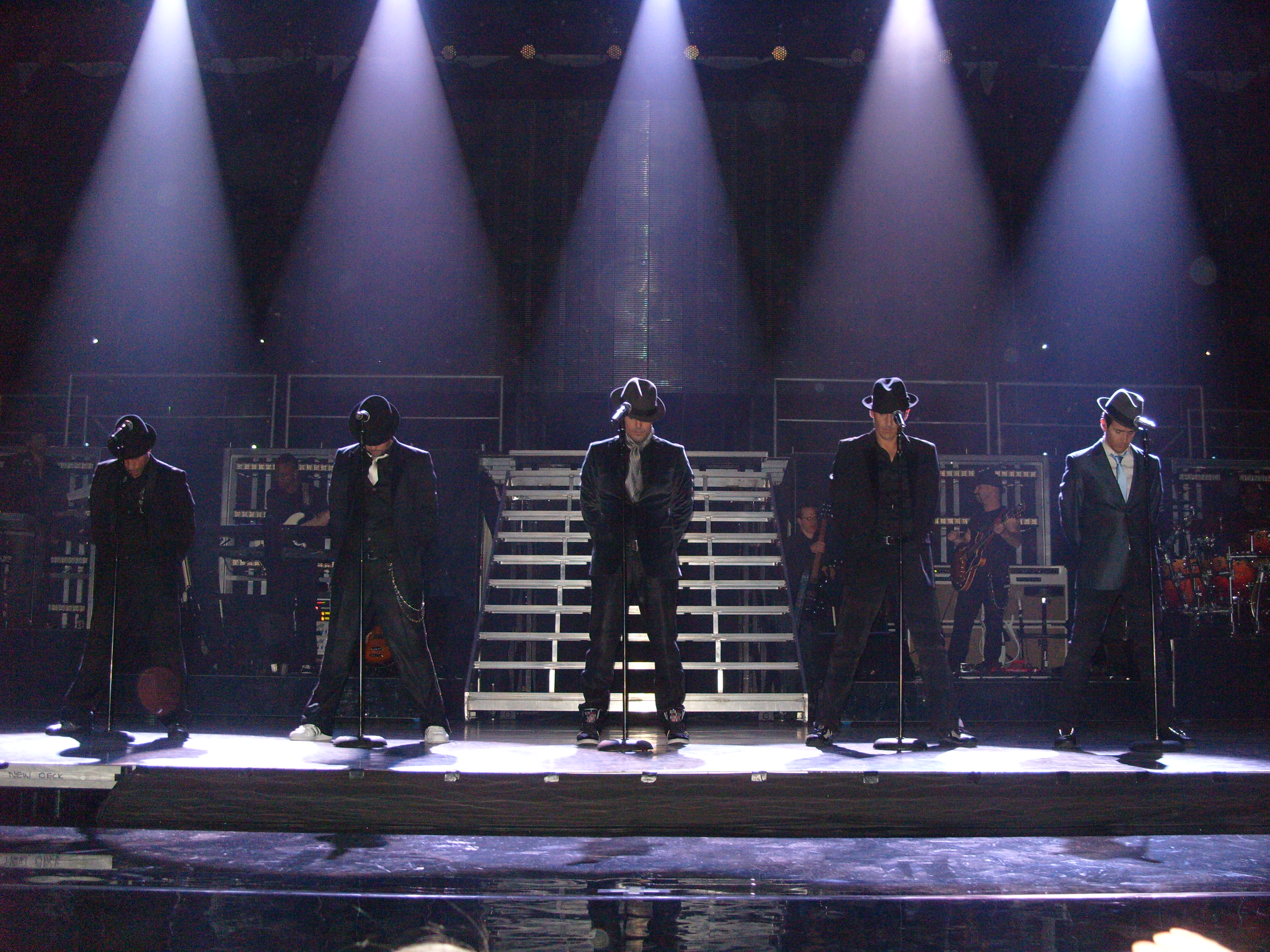
- NKOTB performing during their 2008 tour
- Associated album: The Block; New Kids on the Block: Greatest Hits
- Start date: September 18, 2008
- End date: June 19, 2010
- Legs: 4
- No. of shows: 150

New Kids on the Block concert chronology
- Face the Music Tour (1994); New Kids on the Block Live (2008–10); NKOTBSB Tour (2011–12)

New Kids on the Block Live was the fifth concert tour by American band New Kids on the Block and the first in 14 years since the group broke up after their last tour in 1994. In April 2008, the group reunited on the Today Show, announcing a new album and tour. The tour visited North America and Europe. The tour took place from the fall of 2008 through the summer of 2010. Each year, the tour was revamped with new staging, setlist and tour name. In 2009, the tour was acknowledged as The "Full Service Tour" and in 2010, the tour was known as the "Casi-NO Tour".

== Opening acts ==
- Natasha Bedingfield (North America) (select venues)
- Lady Gaga (North America) (select venues)
- Tami Chynn (North America) (select venues)
- Shontelle (Europe) (select venues)
- JabbaWockeeZ (North America) (select venues)
- Colby O'Donis (North America) (select venues)
- Jesse McCartney (North America) (select venues)

== Setlist ==
New Kids on the Block: Live
1. "Single"
2. "My Favorite Girl"
3. "You Got It (The Right Stuff)"
4. Medley:
  1. "Didn't I (Blow Your Mind This Time)"
  2. "Valentine Girl"
  3. "Please Don't Go Girl"
5. "Grown Man" (with pre-recorded singing by Nicole Scherzinger)
6. "Games"
7. "If You Go Away"
8. "2 in the Morning"
9. "Dirty Dancing"
10. "Tonight"
11. "Twisted"
12. "Baby I Believe In You" (Jordan Knight Solo)
13. "Give It To You" (Jordan Knight Solo)
14. "Stay The Same" (Joey McIntyre Solo)
15. "Cover Girl" (Donnie Wahlberg Solo)
16. "I'll Be Loving You (Forever)"
17. "Click Click Click"
18. "Summertime"

Encore

19. "Step By Step" (contains excerpts from "Push It")
20. "Hangin' Tough" (contains excerpts from "We Will Rock You")

Notes

- "Big Girl Now", "Call It What You Want", "I Remember When" and "Where Do I Go from Here?" where performed at selected dates.
Full Service Tour
1. "Full Service"
2. "Summertime"
3. "My Favorite Girl"
4. "You Got It (The Right Stuff)"
5. Medley:
  1. "Didn't I (Blow Your Mind This Time)"
  2. "Valentine Girl"
  3. "Please Don't Go Girl"
6. "Dirty Dancing"
7. "Games"
8. "If You Go Away"
9. "Stare At You"
10. "Single"
11. "Cover Girl" (Donnie Wahlberg Solo)
12. "Give It To You" (Jordan Knight Solo featuring the Jabbawockeez)
13. "Popsicle" (Joey McIntyre Solo)
14. "Five Brothers and a Million Sisters" (Joey McIntyre Solo)
15. "Tonight"
16. "Click Click Click"
17. "I'll Be Loving You (Forever)"
18. "One Song"

Encore

19. "Step By Step" (contains excerpts from "Push It")
20. "Hangin' Tough" (contains excerpts from "We Will Rock You")

Notes

- "Sexify My Love" and "Stay With Me Baby" where performed at selected dates.
Toys for Tots Benefit
1. "One Song"
2. "Step by Step"
3. "Single"
4. "Coming Home"
5. "Dirty Dancing"
6. "Full Service"^{1}
7. "Merry, Merry Christmas" (Instrumental Interlude)
8. "Funky, Funky Xmas"
9. "Last Night I Saw Santa Claus"
10. "The Christmas Song"
11. "O Holy Night"
12. "This One's for the Children"
13. "Tonight"
14. "(You Got It) The Right Stuff"
15. "Hangin' Tough"

^{1}Performed with Johnny Gill and Ricky Bell

Casi-NO Tour
1. "Lights, Camera, Action"
2. "One Song"
3. "Looking Like Danger"
4. "My Favorite Girl" (contains excerpts from "Poison")
5. "You Got It (The Right Stuff)"
6. "Click Click Click"
7. "Dirty Dancing"
8. "Tonight"
9. "I'll Be Loving You (Forever)"
10. "If You Go Away"
11. "Please Don't Go Girl"
12. "Single"
13. "Sweet Dreams (Are Made of This)" / "Twisted" (Joey McIntyre Solo)
14. "Never Let You Go" (Jordan Knight Solo)
15. "I Got It" (Donnie Wahlberg Solo)
16. "Full Service"
17. "Summertime"
18. "Close to You"

Encore

19. "Step By Step" (contains excerpts from "Push It")
20. "Hangin' Tough" (contains excerpts from "We Will Rock You")

== Tour dates ==
List of concerts, showing date, city, country, venue and opening acts
Date	City	Country	Venue	Opening acts
North America
September 18, 2008	Toronto	Canada	Air Canada Centre	Natasha Bedingfield; Colby O'Donis
September 19, 2008	Toronto	Canada	Air Canada Centre	Natasha Bedingfield; Colby O'Donis
September 20, 2008	Montreal	Canada	Bell Centre	Natasha Bedingfield; Colby O'Donis
September 21, 2008	Toronto	Canada	Air Canada Centre	Natasha Bedingfield; Colby O'Donis
September 23, 2008	East Rutherford	United States	Izod Center	Natasha Bedingfield; Colby O'Donis
September 24, 2008	Uniondale	United States	Nassau Veterans Memorial Coliseum	Natasha Bedingfield; Colby O'Donis
September 26, 2008	Boston	United States	TD Banknorth Garden	Natasha Bedingfield; Colby O'Donis
September 27, 2008	Atlantic City	United States	Borgata Events Center	Natasha Bedingfield; Colby O'Donis
September 28, 2008	Boston	United States	TD Banknorth Garden	Natasha Bedingfield; Colby O'Donis
September 30, 2008	Uncasville	United States	Mohegan Sun Arena	Natasha Bedingfield; Colby O'Donis
October 2, 2008	Washington, D.C.	United States	Verizon Center	Natasha Bedingfield; Colby O'Donis
October 3, 2008	Cleveland	United States	Quicken Loans Arena	Natasha Bedingfield; Colby O'Donis
October 4, 2008	Rosemont	United States	Allstate Arena	Natasha Bedingfield; Colby O'Donis
October 8, 2008	Los Angeles	United States	Staples Center	Natasha Bedingfield; Lady Gaga
October 9, 2008	Sacramento	United States	ARCO Arena	Natasha Bedingfield; Lady Gaga
October 10, 2008	San Jose	United States	HP Pavilion at San Jose	Natasha Bedingfield; Lady Gaga
October 11, 2008	Las Vegas	United States	Mandalay Bay Events Center	Natasha Bedingfield; Lady Gaga
October 13, 2008	Glendale	United States	Jobing.com Arena	Natasha Bedingfield; Tami Chynn
October 16, 2008	Houston	United States	Toyota Center	Natasha Bedingfield; Tami Chynn
October 17, 2008	San Antonio	United States	AT&T Center	Natasha Bedingfield; Tami Chynn
October 18, 2008	New Orleans	United States	New Orleans Arena	Natasha Bedingfield; Tami Chynn
October 19, 2008	Dallas	United States	American Airlines Center	Natasha Bedingfield; Tami Chynn
October 21, 2008	Saint Paul	United States	Xcel Energy Center	Natasha Bedingfield; Tami Chynn
October 22, 2008	Milwaukee	United States	Bradley Center	Natasha Bedingfield; Tami Chynn
October 24, 2008	Rosemont	United States	Allstate Arena	Natasha Bedingfield; Tami Chynn
October 25, 2008	Auburn Hills	United States	The Palace of Auburn Hills	Natasha Bedingfield; Tami Chynn
October 27, 2008	New York City	United States	Madison Square Garden	Natasha Bedingfield; Lady Gaga
October 29, 2008	Duluth	United States	The Arena at Gwinnett Center	Natasha Bedingfield; Lady Gaga
October 30, 2008	Charlotte	United States	Time Warner Cable Arena	Natasha Bedingfield; Lady Gaga
November 1, 2008	Sunrise	United States	BankAtlantic Center	Natasha Bedingfield; Lady Gaga
November 2, 2008	Tampa	United States	St. Pete Times Forum	Natasha Bedingfield; Lady Gaga
November 5, 2008	Philadelphia	United States	Wachovia Center	Natasha Bedingfield; Lady Gaga
November 6, 2008	Providence	United States	Dunkin' Donuts Center	Natasha Bedingfield; Lady Gaga
November 7, 2008	Atlantic City	United States	Borgata Events Center	Natasha Bedingfield; Lady Gaga
November 8, 2008	Uncasville	United States	Mohegan Sun Arena	Natasha Bedingfield; Lady Gaga
November 10, 2008	St. Louis	United States	Scottrade Center	Natasha Bedingfield; Lady Gaga
November 11, 2008	Kansas City	United States	Sprint Center	Natasha Bedingfield; Lady Gaga
November 12, 2008	Omaha	United States	Qwest Center Omaha	Natasha Bedingfield; Lady Gaga
November 14, 2008	Broomfield	United States	Broomfield Event Center	Natasha Bedingfield; Lady Gaga
November 15, 2008	West Valley City	United States	E Center of West Valley City	Natasha Bedingfield; Lady Gaga
November 18, 2008 (Note: Rescheduled show from November 17, 2008.)	Edmonton	Canada	Rexall Place	Natasha Bedingfield; Lady Gaga
November 19, 2008	Calgary	Canada	Pengrowth Saddledome	Natasha Bedingfield; Lady Gaga
November 21, 2008	Vancouver	Canada	General Motors Place	Natasha Bedingfield; Lady Gaga
November 22, 2008	Tacoma	United States	Tacoma Dome	Natasha Bedingfield; Lady Gaga
November 25, 2008 (Note: Rescheduled show from November 26, 2008 at the San Diego Sports Arena.)	San Diego	United States	Cox Arena at Aztec Bowl	Natasha Bedingfield; Lady Gaga
November 26, 2008 (Note: Originally scheduled at Staples Center, but it was moved in order to resolve a Los Angeles Clippers home game scheduling conflict.)	Los Angeles	United States	Nokia Theatre	Natasha Bedingfield; Lady Gaga
November 30, 2008	Zapopan	Mexico	Auditorio TELMEX	—N/a
December 2, 2008	Mexico City	Mexico	Auditorio Nacional	Lady Gaga
December 4, 2008	Monterrey	Mexico	Arena Monterrey	Lady Gaga
Europe
January 16, 2009	Manchester	England	Manchester Evening News Arena	Shontelle
January 17, 2009	Birmingham	England	National Indoor Arena	Shontelle
January 18, 2009	Glasgow	Scotland	Clyde Auditorium	Shontelle
January 20, 2009	Belfast	Northern Ireland	Odyssey Arena	Shontelle
January 21, 2009	Dublin	Ireland	The O_{2}	Shontelle
January 23, 2009	Nottingham	England	Trent FM Arena Nottingham	Shontelle
January 24, 2009	London	England	The O_{2}	Shontelle
January 25, 2009	London	England	Hammersmith Apollo	Shontelle
January 27, 2009	Sheffield	England	Sheffield Arena	Shontelle
January 28, 2009	Newcastle	England	Metro Radio Arena	Shontelle
January 29, 2009	Cardiff	Wales	Cardiff International Arena	Shontelle
January 31, 2009	Frankfurt	Germany	Jahrhunderthalle	Shontelle
February 1, 2009	Brussels	Belgium	Forest National	—N/a
February 3, 2009	Amsterdam	Netherlands	Heineken Music Hall	—N/a
February 4, 2009	Paris	France	Zénith de Paris	—N/a
February 5, 2009	Düsseldorf	Germany	Philips Halle	—N/a
North America
March 7, 2009^{[A]}	Hidalgo	United States	Dodge Arena	Jabbawockeez
March 9, 2009	Tulsa	United States	BOK Center	Jabbawockeez
March 10, 2009	Bossier City	United States	CenturyTel Center	Jabbawockeez
March 12, 2009	Estero	United States	Germain Arena	Jabbawockeez
March 13, 2009	Orlando	United States	Amway Arena	Jabbawockeez
March 14, 2009	Biloxi	United States	Studio B	Jabbawockeez
March 16, 2009	Nashville	United States	Sommet Center	Jabbawockeez
March 17, 2009	Greenville	United States	BI-LO Center	Jabbawockeez
March 18, 2009	Richmond	United States	Richmond Coliseum	Jabbawockeez
March 19, 2009	Baltimore	United States	1st Mariner Arena	Jabbawockeez
March 20, 2009	Hershey	United States	Giant Center	Jabbawockeez
March 22, 2009	Erie	United States	Louis J. Tullio Arena	Jabbawockeez
March 24, 2009	University Park	United States	Bryce Jordan Center	Jabbawockeez
March 25, 2009	Portland	United States	Cumberland County Civic Center	Jabbawockeez
March 26, 2009	Syracuse	United States	War Memorial at Oncenter	Jabbawockeez
March 28, 2009	Niagara Falls	United States	Seneca Niagara Events Center	Jabbawockeez
March 29, 2009	London	Canada	John Labatt Centre	Jabbawockeez
March 30, 2009	Ottawa	Canada	Scotiabank Place	Jabbawockeez
March 31, 2009	Manchester	United States	Verizon Wireless Arena	Jabbawockeez
April 2, 2009	Moline	United States	iWireless Center	Jabbawockeez
April 3, 2009	Columbus	United States	Nationwide Arena	Jabbawockeez
April 4, 2009	Grand Rapids	United States	Van Andel Arena	Jabbawockeez
April 5, 2009	Champaign	United States	Assembly Hall	Jabbawockeez
April 6, 2009	Des Moines	United States	Wells Fargo Arena	Jabbawockeez
April 7, 2009	Ashwaubenon	United States	Resch Center	Jabbawockeez
April 9, 2009	Winnipeg	Canada	MTS Centre	Jabbawockeez
April 11, 2009	Saskatoon	Canada	Credit Union Centre	Jabbawockeez
April 13, 2009	Kelowna	Canada	Prospera Place	Jabbawockeez
April 14, 2009	Victoria	Canada	Save-On-Foods Memorial Centre	Jabbawockeez
April 16, 2009	Fresno	United States	Save Mart Center	Jabbawockeez
April 17, 2009	Santa Barbara	United States	Santa Barbara Bowl	Jabbawockeez
April 18, 2009	Los Angeles	United States	Hollywood Palladium	Jabbawockeez
May 15, 2009 ^{[B]}	Miami	United States	Dynasty Lounge	—N/a
May 16, 2009^{[B]}	Miami	United States	Dynasty Lounge	—N/a
May 17, 2009^{[B]}	Miami	United States	Dynasty Lounge	—N/a
May 18, 2009^{[B]}	Miami	United States	Dynasty Lounge	—N/a
Full Service Tour
June 4, 2009 (Note: Rescheduled show from May 28, 2009.)	Atlanta	United States	Lakewood Amphitheater	Jesse McCartney; Jabbawockeez
June 5, 2009	Virginia Beach	United States	Verizon Wireless Virginia Beach Amphitheater	Jesse McCartney; Jabbawockeez
June 6, 2009	Camden	United States	Susquehanna Bank Center	Jesse McCartney; Jabbawockeez
June 7, 2009 (Note: Originally scheduled at Bristow's Nissan Pavilion at Stone Ridge.)	Fairfax	United States	Patriot Center	Jabbawockeez
June 10, 2009	Scranton	United States	Toyota Pavilion at Montage Mountain	Jesse McCartney; Jabbawockeez
June 11, 2009	Burgettstown	United States	Post-Gazette Pavilion	Jesse McCartney; Jabbawockeez
June 12, 2009	Wantagh	United States	Nikon at Jones Beach Theater	Jesse McCartney; Jabbawockeez
June 13, 2009	Holmdel	United States	PNC Bank Arts Center	Jesse McCartney; Jabbawockeez
June 14, 2009	Corfu	United States	Darien Lake Performing Arts Center	Jesse McCartney; Jabbawockeez
June 16, 2009	Saratoga Springs	United States	Saratoga Performing Arts Center	Jabbawockeez
June 18, 2009	Uncasville	United States	Mohegan Sun Arena	Jesse McCartney; Jabbawockeez
June 19, 2009	Mansfield	United States	Comcast Center	Jesse McCartney; Jabbawockeez
June 20, 2009^{[C]}	Montreal	Canada	Parc Jean-Drapeau	—N/a
June 21, 2009	Toronto	Canada	Molson Amphitheatre	Jesse McCartney; Jabbawockeez
June 23, 2009	Cuyahoga Falls	United States	Blossom Music Center	Jesse McCartney; Jabbawockeez
June 25, 2009	Clarkston	United States	DTE Energy Music Theatre	Jesse McCartney; Jabbawockeez
June 26, 2009	Tinley Park	United States	First Midwest Bank Amphitheatre	Jesse McCartney; Jabbawockeez
June 27, 2009	Cincinnati	United States	Riverbend Music Center	Jesse McCartney; Jabbawockeez
June 28, 2009	Noblesville	United States	Verizon Wireless Music Center	Jesse McCartney; Jabbawockeez
July 1, 2009	Maryland Heights	United States	Verizon Wireless Amphitheater	Jesse McCartney; Jabbawockeez
July 2, 2009	Memphis	United States	Mud Island Amphitheatre	Jesse McCartney; Jabbawockeez
July 3, 2009	Park City	United States	Hartman Arena	Jesse McCartney; Jabbawockeez
July 7, 2009	Auburn	United States	White River Amphitheatre	Jesse McCartney; Jabbawockeez
July 9, 2009	Concord	United States	Sleep Train Pavilion	Jesse McCartney; Jabbawockeez
July 10, 2009	Irvine	United States	Verizon Wireless Amphitheatre	Jesse McCartney; Jabbawockeez
July 11, 2009	Las Vegas	United States	Pearl Concert Theater	Jesse McCartney; Jabbawockeez
July 12, 2009	Phoenix	United States	Cricket Wireless Pavilion	Jesse McCartney; Jabbawockeez
July 15, 2009	Greenwood Village	United States	Fiddler's Green Amphitheatre	Jabbawockeez
July 17, 2009	Dallas	United States	SuperPages.com Center	Jabbawockeez
July 18, 2009	The Woodlands	United States	Cynthia Woods Mitchell Pavilion	Jabbawockeez
December 22, 2009 ^{[D]}	Boston	United States	House of Blues	—N/a
Casi-NO Tour
May 7, 2010	Las Vegas	United States	The Pearl Concert Theater	—N/a
May 8, 2010	Las Vegas	United States	The Pearl Concert Theater	—N/a
May 13, 2010	Miami Beach	United States	The Fillmore Miami Beach	—N/a
May 14, 2010 ^{[E]}	Miami	United States	Dynasty Lounge	—N/a
May 15, 2010 ^{[E]}	Miami	United States	Dynasty Lounge	—N/a
May 16, 2010 ^{[E]}	Miami	United States	Dynasty Lounge	—N/a
May 17, 2010 ^{[E]}	Miami	United States	Dynasty Lounge	—N/a
May 21, 2010	Ledyard	United States	MGM Grand Theater	—N/a
May 22, 2010	Ledyard	United States	MGM Grand Theater	—N/a
May 28, 2010	Atlantic City	United States	Borgata Events Center	—N/a
May 29, 2010	Atlantic City	United States	Borgata Events Center	—N/a
June 4, 2010	Hammond	United States	The Venue at Horseshoe Hammond	—N/a
June 5, 2010	Hammond	United States	The Venue at Horseshoe Hammond	—N/a
June 6, 2010	Hammond	United States	The Venue at Horseshoe Hammond	—N/a
June 10, 2010	Rama	Canada	Casino Rama Entertainment Centre	—N/a
June 11, 2010	Rama	Canada	Casino Rama Entertainment Centre	—N/a
June 12, 2010	Windsor	Canada	The Colosseum at Caesars Windsor	—N/a
June 17, 2010	New York City	United States	Radio City Music Hall	—N/a
June 18, 2010	New York City	United States	Radio City Music Hall	—N/a
June 19, 2010	New York City	United States	Radio City Music Hall	—N/a

Notes

Music festivals and other miscellaneous performances

^{A} This concert was a part of Borderfest Music Festival 2009.
^{B} These concerts were a part of the New Kids on the Block Cruise 2009.
^{C} This concert was a part of Virgin Festival Canada.
^{D} This concert was a part of a Toys for Tots Benefit.
^{E} These concerts were a part of the New Kids on the Block Cruise 2010.

Cancellations and rescheduled dates

List of cancelled concerts showing date, city, country, venue and reason
Date	City	Country	Venue	Reason
October 14, 2008	Albuquerque	United States	Tingley Coliseum	Unknown reason
November 24, 2008	Portland	United States	Rose Garden Arena	Unknown reason
May 29, 2009	Pelham	United States	Verizon Wireless Music Center	Production delays
May 30, 2009	Tampa	United States	Ford Amphitheatre	Production delays
May 31, 2009	West Palm Beach	United States	Cruzan Amphitheatre	Production delays
June 2, 2009	Charlotte	United States	Verizon Wireless Amphitheatre	Production delays
June 3, 2009	Raleigh	United States	Time Warner Cable Music Pavilion	Production delays
July 13, 2009	El Paso	United States	Don Haskins Center	Unknown reason
August 1, 2009	Perth	Australia	Burswood Dome	Worldwide economic recession
August 3, 2009	Adelaide	Australia	Adelaide Entertainment Centre	Worldwide economic recession
August 4, 2009	Melbourne	Australia	Rod Laver Arena	Worldwide economic recession
August 6, 2009	Newcastle	Australia	Newcastle Entertainment Centre	Worldwide economic recession
August 8, 2009	Brisbane	Australia	Brisbane Entertainment Centre	Worldwide economic recession
August 10, 2009	Sydney	Australia	Acer Arena	Worldwide economic recession
August 15, 2009	Wollongong	Australia	WIN Entertainment Centre	Worldwide economic recession

=== Box office score data ===
Venue	City	Tickets Sold / Available	Gross Revenue
Bell Centre	Montréal	11,510 / 11,510 (100%)	$713,520
Nassau Veterans Memorial Coliseum	Uniondale	11,784 / 11,784 (100%)	$750,114
TD Banknorth Garden	Boston	27,017 / 27,017 (100%)	$1,783,505
Mohegan Sun Arena	Uncasville	6,835 / 7,593 (90%)	$478,566
Verizon Center	Washington, D.C.	13,213 / 13,213 (100%)	$874,837
Quicken Loans Arena	Cleveland	14,040 / 15,758 (89%)	$760,645
Allstate Arena	Rosemont	26,774 / 26,774 (100%)	$1,701,660
Staples Center	Los Angeles	13,699 / 13,699 (100%)	$921,753
ARCO Arena	Sacramento	5,634 / 12,937 (44%)	$311,713
HP Pavilion at San Jose	San Jose	12,792 / 12,792 (100%)	$831,900
Mandalay Bay Events Center	Paradise	7,312 / 8,265 (88%)	$610,802
Jobing.com Arena	Glendale	7,593 / 14,000 (54%)	$460,538
Toyota Center	Houston	9,405 / 10,402 (90%)	$577,402
AT&T Center	San Antonio	7,515 / 8,339 (90%)	$464,714
New Orleans Arena	New Orleans	9,149 / 12,914 (71%)	$546,499
American Airlines Center	Dallas	11,397 / 14,039 (81%)	$738,310
Xcel Energy Center	Saint Paul	10,889 / 14,529 (75%)	$630,820
Bradley Center	Milwaukee	7,757 / 10,086 (77%)	$463,492
Palace of Auburn Hills	Auburn Hill	13,434 / 13,434 (100%)	$837,434
Madison Square Garden	New York City	14,031 / 14,031 (100%)	$885,633
The Arena at Gwinnett Center	Duluth	10,400 / 10,400 (100%)	$753,395
Time Warner Cable Arena	Charlotte	8,134 / 13,330 (61%)	$431,975
BankAtlantic Center	Sunrise	9,786 / 13,488 (73%)	$522,181
Wachovia Center	Philadelphia	14,274 / 15,981 (89%)	$959,333
Dunkin' Donuts Center	Providence	7,575 / 8,848 (86%)	$475,029
Scottrade Center	St. Louis	10,617 / 14, 271 (74%)	$540,471
Qwest Center Omaha	Omaha	7,219 / 11,253 (64%)	$357,621
Broomfield Event Center	Broomfield	5,057 / 5,419 (93%)	$315,100
E Center of West Valley City	West Valley City	3,782 / 9,798 (39%)	$219,255
Rexall Place	Edmonton	7,878 / 12,154 (65%)	$436,758
Tacoma Dome	Tacoma	9,788 / 14,591 (67%)	$567,846
Cox Arena at Aztec Bowl	San Diego	6,637 / 9,766 (68%)	$342,447
Nokia Theatre	Los Angeles	6,870 / 6,870 (100%)	$479,775
Auditorio Nacional	Mexico City	3,916 / 9,683 (40%)	$179,220
Odyssey Arena	Belfast	1,891 / 3,000 (63%)	$115,448
The O_{2}	Dublin	3,751 / 6,000 (63%)	$266,674
The O_{2}	London	15,494 / 15,600 (99%)	$803,697
Heineken Music Hall	Amsterdam	3,895 / 5,250 (74%)	$211,151
Le Zénith de Paris	Paris	2,650 / 6,100 (43%)	$169,303
Dodge Arena	Hidalgo	3,427 / 4,864 (70%)	149,906
CenturyTel Center	Bossier City	3,730 / 7,298 (51%)	a$183,635
Richmond Coliseum	Richmond	3,016 / 5,197 (58%)	$186,466
Bryce Jordan Center	University Park	2,840 / 6,365 (45%)	$85,950
Nationwide Arena	Columbus	6,861 / 8,951 (77%)	$369,786
Van Andel Arena	Grand Rapids	5,813 / 8,650 (67%)	$298,160
Assembly Hall	Champaign	2,938 / 5,000 (59%)	$169,924
Wells Fargo Arena	Des Moines	4,128 / 7,440 (55%)	198,695
Resch Center	Ashwaubenon	4,238 / 7,003 (61%)	$156,601
Prospera Place	Kelowna	1,571 / 3,200 (49%)	$69,148
Save-On-Foods Memorial Centre	Victoria	2,027 / 4,000 (51%)	$99,313
Save Mart Center at Fresno State	Fresno	5,751 / 8,552 (67%)	$260,438
Santa Barbara Bowl	Santa Barbara	1,989/ 4,207 (47%)	$146,117
Lakewood Amphitheater	Atlanta	8,666 / 18,824 (46%)	$212,682
Time Warner Cable Music Pavilion	Charlotte	8,134 / 13,300 (61%)	$431,975
Verizon Wireless Virginia Beach Amphitheater	Virginia Beach	9,973 / 20,055 (50%)	195,999
Susquehanna Bank Center	Camden	6,879 / 24,894 (28%)	$284,804
Patriot Center	Fairfax	3,992 / 7,388 (54%)	$158,162
Toyota Pavilion at Montage Mountain	Scranton	3,237 / 5,359 (60%)	$110,587
Post-Gazette Pavilion	Burgettstown	10,410 / 23,078 (45%)	$201,327
Nikon at Jones Beach Theater	Wantagh	8,093 / 13,382 (59%)	$379,102
PNC Bank Arts Center	Holmdel	5,987 / 16,996 (35%)	$319,027
Darien Lake Performing Arts Center	Corfu	6,186 / 21,193 (29%)	$216,857
Saratoga Performing Arts Center	Saratoga Springs	5,857 / 25, 264 (23%)	$162,203
Mohegan Sun Arena	Uncasville	5,974 / 7,660 (78%)	$306,120
Comcast Center	Mansfield	10,097 / 20,982 (48%)	$546,301
Molson Amphitheatre	Toronto	9,484 / 10,000 (95%)	$477,952
Blossom Music Center	Cuyahoga Falls	9,053 / 20,351 (45%)	$250,565
DTE Energy Music Center	Clarkston	10,299 / 15,274 (67%)	$300,072
First Midwest Bank Amphitheatre	Tinley Park	12,209 / 28,630 (43%)	$340,542
Riverbend Music Center	Cincinnati	11,267 / 20,500 (55%)	$355,775
Verizon Wireless Music Center	Noblesville	11,240 / 24,410 (46%)	$209,617
Verizon Wireless Amphitheater	Maryland Heights	7,561 / 20,000 (38%)	$219,737
Mud Island Amphitheatre	Memphis	3,215 / 4,700 (68%)	$161,060
White River Amphitheatre	Auburn	4,858 / 19,544 (24%)	$177,446
Sleep Train Pavilion	Concord	8,703 / 12,681 (69%)	$329,324
Verizon Wireless Amphitheatre	Irvine	8,200 / 15,000 (55%)	$280,148
Fiddler's Green Amphitheatre	Greenwood Village	5,950 / 7,893 (75%)	$149,551
SuperPages.com Center	Dallas	6,343 / 19,970 (32%)	$286,779
Cynthia Woods Mitchell Pavilion	The Woodlands	8,100 / 16,000 (51%)	$352,329
House of Blues	Boston	2,503 / 2,529 (99%)	$143,940
The Fillmore Miami Beach	Miami	2,081 / 2,713 (77%)	$130,171
The Venue at Horseshoe Hammond	Hammond	5,779 / 6,716 (77%)	$506,522
The Colosseum at Caesars Windsor	Windsor	4,135 / 4,934 (85%)	$325,427
Radio City Music Hall	New York City	16,961 / 17,802 (95%)	$1,248,652
TOTAL		716,149 / 1,034,316 (65%)	$35,365,360

== Broadcasts and recordings ==
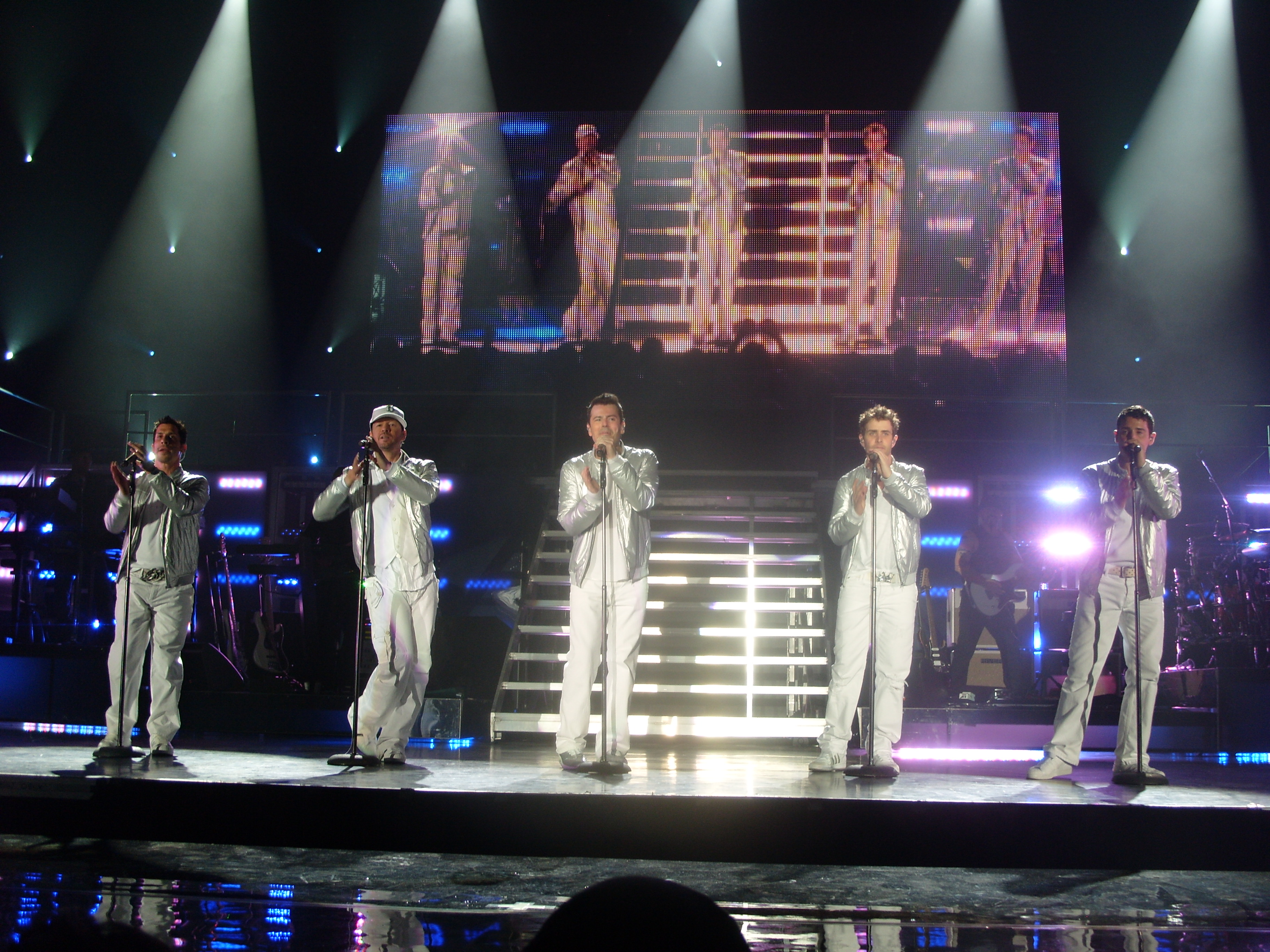
NKOTB performing during the European leg of tour

The 2008–2009 tour was chronicled on the documentary, "Coming Home". The film featured a behind the scenes process of the group making the latest studio album, "The Block" and preparation for the upcoming tour. The footage is interlaced with performances of their biggest hits. It also features a new song "Coming Home", which was a potential addition to the album. The song was performed for the first time at the Toys for Tots benefit show. The group describes the fill as "a love letter to the fans". As a part of the promotion of releasing the documentary, NKOTB held a "Demand Us!" contest where fans could "demand" that NKOTB come to their city and host a DVD screening party at a local theatre. The cities that won were New York, Seattle, and Wheeling, West Virginia. A DVD was released on February 10, 2010, followed by showings on Palladia HD.
