= Face the Music Tour =

1994 concert tour by New Kids on the Block

- Tour by New Kids on the Block
- Associated album: Face the Music
- Start date: April 1, 1994
- End date: May 1, 1994

New Kids on the Block concert chronology
- Magic Summer Tour (1990–92); Face the Music Tour (1994); New Kids on the Block Live (2008–10)

The Face the Music Tour was a worldwide concert tour by the band New Kids on the Block, undertaken in 1994 in support of their fourth studio album Face the Music. It was their last tour for nearly fifteen years until they reunited in 2008 for New Kids on the Block: Live. They performed songs like "Never Let You Go" and "Dirty Dawg".

== Overview ==
Although Face the Music was not a commercial hit, NKOTB went on tour to support the album and reconnect with their fanbase. While they retained massive popularity throughout Europe, Asia, and the United Kingdom, they struggled to find bookings at venues in North America. They ended up performing in nightclubs and theaters, which was a far cry from the sports stadiums and arenas they had become accustomed to playing in at the height of their fame.

During the group's touring of Italy in early 1994, group member Jonathan Knight dropped out and retired to his farm in Massachusetts, struggling with panic attacks and anxiety. According to Donnie Wahlberg on the Behind the Music special, Knight was reluctant to quit, so his leaving was agreed upon by a group vote. To explain his absence, the band stated on an appearance on The Arsenio Hall Show that he had been injured after falling off a horse.

Despite selling out theaters, NKOTB felt that the fanbase had grown up and moved on to grunge music and gangsta rap. By June of that year, the rest of the group decided to disband after the final concert in Massachusetts.

== Opening acts ==
- Marky Mark and the Funky Bunch (in select venues)
- Nice & Smooth

== Setlist ==
1. "Dirty Dawg"
2. "Girls "
3. "My Favorite Girl"
4. "Stop It Girl"
5. "Be My Girl "
6. "Never Let You Go"
7. "Happy Birthday"
8. "Since You Walked Into My Life"
9. "I'll Be Waitin'"
10. "If You Go Away"
11. "You Got It (The Right Stuff)"
12. "Step by Step"
13. "Cover Girl"
14. "Games"
15. "Mrs. Right"
16. "Let's Play House"
17. "Never Gonna Fall in Love Again"
18. "I'll Be Loving You (Forever)"
19. "Didn't I (Blow Your Mind)"
20. "Popsicle"
21. "Baby, I Believe in You"
22. "Call It What You Want"
23. "Hold On"
24. "Hangin' Tough"

== Tour dates ==
Date	City	Country	Venue
April 1, 1994	Philadelphia	United States	Theatre of Living Arts
April 2, 1994	New York City	United States	The Academy
April 3, 1994	New Haven	United States	Toad's Place
April 4, 1994	Providence	United States	The Strand
April 5, 1994	Toronto	Canada	Palladium Club
April 7, 1994	Buffalo	United States	Metropolitan Club
April 9, 1994	Baltimore	United States	Camden Yards Concert Theater
April 10, 1994	Charlotte	United States	Cellar Door
April 11, 1994	Cincinnati	United States	Bogarts
April 12, 1994	Pittsburgh	United States	Metropole Club
April 13, 1994	Indianapolis	United States	Warren Auditorium
April 14, 1994	Cleveland	United States	
April 16, 1994	Kansas City	United States	Memorial Hall
April 17, 1994	San Antonio	United States	Freeman Colliseum
April 19, 1994	El Paso	United States	Metropolis
April 21, 1994	Ventura	United States	Ventura Theater
April 22, 1994	Los Angeles	United States	The Palace
April 23, 1994	Clearlake, California	United States	Konocti Harbor Resort & Spa
April 27, 1994	St. Louis	United States	Westport Playhouse
April 28, 1994	Detroit	United States	Royal Oak Theater
April 29, 1994	Chicago	United States	Riviera Theatre
April 30, 1994	Milwaukee	United States	The Rave
May 1, 1994	Minneapolis	United States	The Grand Slam
