= No More Games/The Remix Album =

Remix album by New Kids on the Block
- Released: November 15, 1990
- Recorded: 1987 – May 1990
- Length: 67:37
- Label: Columbia
- Producers: David Cole, Robert Clivillés

New Kids on the Block chronology
Step by Step (1990)	No More Games/The Remix Album (1990)	H.I.T.S. (1991)

No More Games/The Remix Album is a remix album from pop group New Kids on the Block. It peaked at number 19 on the US Billboard 200.

== Background and production ==
By early 1991, the ever-shifting status of musical trends had begun to take its toll on the enormous popularity of the New Kids on the Block. Only two years before, the group had taken the U.S. (and the world) by storm with its seminal second release, Hangin' Tough. In June 1990, the album Step by Step would spawn the group's most successful single, the title track. After the final single from the album, "Let's Try It Again", failed to crack the top forty, a seeming backlash had become evident.

Sensing this, group member Donnie Wahlberg led the group in coordinating this remix album, which fused the "harder" elements of hip-hop and urban dance into the New Kids' sound, resulting in No More Games/The Remix Album—with a significant portion of the album remixed by Robert Clivilles and David Cole (of C+C Music Factory fame). Also employed was a marketing tactic to release the album under the 'NKOTB' acronym. Since the youngest group member was now eighteen years old, and the rest were in their early twenties, they had arguably grown out of the New 'Kids' On The Block moniker that they rose to fame with. More significantly, it was an attempt to dissociate from the stigma that was attached to that name.

== Singles ==
The album's first single, "Call It What You Want (The C&C Pump-It Mix)" is a house remix track, again produced by Clivilles/Cole, featuring an intro rap from Freedom Williams. The song was another that received decent (though not enthusiastic) airplay in North America during the spring months of 1991, and could be considered the "last hurrah" in terms of singles from the group's initial run. The single peaked at number 12 on the UK Singles Chart. The album opens up with "Games (The New Kids Get Hard Mix)", a track co-written by Donnie Wahlberg, that originally appeared on the Step by Step album. Employing hip-hop samples, jazz riffs sung by Jordan Knight, and defensive rhymes by Wahlberg, "Games" was a dramatic departure from their previously clean cut sound and was released as the album's second single. The song received decent airplay from stations nationwide, but was not a major hit on the charts. "Baby, I Believe in You" was released as a third single it peaked at number 91 on the ARIA Charts, number 64 in Netherlands and number 20 in New Zealand.

== Critical reception ==
Professional ratings
Review scores
Source	Rating
AllMusic	2/5 stars
Entertainment Weekly	B

The album received favorable reviews from music critics. Rob Tannenbaum from Entertainment Weekly gave the album a B and wrote that the album's remixes "are changed as drastically as black-and-white films that have been colorized". He also claimed that even though "the remixers' talents are wasted on archaic ballads like "Please Don't Go Girl" and "Valentine Girl" the album "contemporary makeover goes a long way toward making the New Kids sound grown-up". Pedro B. from Sputnikmusic website gave the album three and a half stars out of five and wrote that even though the album "is not musically excellent" "it is a very well-conceived album, perfect for the audience it targeted, and conceptually perfect." AllMusic wrote no review for the album but gave to it two out of five stars.

== Commercial performance ==
Although No More Games/The Remix Album was certified gold in the US, the album did not restore the group's former success. Their popularity had waned by the time of the album's release, as the pre-teens who had liked them at their peak were the same audience who would become part of "Generation X", embracing the forthcoming grunge and gangsta rap sounds that ended the dominance of late 80s/early 90s dance/pop.

== Track listing ==
1. "Games [The Kids Get Hard Mix]" (Donnie Wahlberg/Maurice Starr)
2. "Call It What You Want [The C&C Pump-It Mix]" (Starr)
3. "Please Don't Go Girl" (Starr)
4. "Cover Girl" (Starr)
5. "Baby, I Believe In You [The Love Mix]" (Starr)
6. "Hangin' Tough [In a Funky Way]" (Starr)
7. "Step by Step [The C&C Vocal Club Mix]" (Starr)
8. "My Favorite Girl" (Donnie Wahlberg/Jordan Knight/Starr)
9. "Valentine Girl [The C&C Quiet Storm Mix]" (Starr)
10. "The Right Stuff [The New Kids in the House Mix]" (Starr)
11. "Whatcha Gonna Do (About It)" (Starr)
12. "Never Gonna Fall In Love Again [The C&C Music Factory Mix]" (Danny Wood/Donnie Wahlberg/Michael Jonzun/Taharqa Aleem/Starr)
13. "Toasties" [Japan Bonus Track] (Maurice Starr/Al Lancellotti)
  - Lead vocals by Joey McIntyre (Japan Bonus Track)

== Charts ==
=== Weekly charts ===
Chart performance for No More Games/The Remix Album
Chart (1990)	Peak position
Australian Albums (ARIA)	34
Austrian Albums (Ö3 Austria)	16
Canada Top Albums/CDs (RPM)	12
Dutch Albums (Album Top 100)	27
European Albums Chart	25
Finnish Albums (Suomen virallinen lista)	15
German Albums (Offizielle Top 100)	40
Icelandic Albums (Tónlist)	4
Irish Albums (IRMA)	6
Japanese Albums (Oricon)	18
New Zealand Albums (RMNZ)	28
Spanish Albums (Promusicae)	19
Swedish Albums (Sverigetopplistan)	41
UK Albums (Official Charts)	15
US Billboard 200	19

=== Year-end charts ===
Year-end chart performance for No More Games/The Remix Album
Chart (1991)	Position
US Billboard 200	81

== Certifications and sales ==
Certifications and sales for No More Games/The Remix Album
Region	Certification	Certified units/sales
Austria (IFPI Austria)	Gold	25,000^{*}
Brazil (Pro-Música Brasil)	Gold	100,000^{*}
Canada (Music Canada)	2× Platinum	200,000^{^}
Finland (Musiikkituottajat)	Gold	32,457
Japan (RIAJ)	Gold	100,000^{^}
Spain (Promusicae)	Gold	50,000^{^}
United States (RIAA)	Gold	500,000^{^}
^{*} Sales figures based on certification alone.^{^} Shipments figures based on certification alone.
