= Step by Step (New Kids on the Block album) =

Studio album by New Kids on the Block
- Released: June 5, 1990
- Recorded: September 1, 1989 – April 30, 1990
- Studios: Unique Recording Studios, New York City
- Genre: Pop
- Length: 47:44
- Label: Columbia
- Producer: Maurice Starr

New Kids on the Block chronology
Merry, Merry Christmas (1989)	Step by Step (1990)	No More Games/The Remix Album (1990)

Singles from Step by Step
- 1. "Step by Step" Released: May 10, 1990; 2. "Valentine Girl" Released: June 18, 1990; 3. "Tonight" Released: July 26, 1990; 4. "Let's Try It Again" Released: September 20, 1990; 5. "Games" Released: October 17, 1990; 6. "Call It What You Want" Released: January 27, 1991; 7. "Baby, I Believe in You"

Step by Step is the fourth studio album by American boy band New Kids on the Block, released in June 1990 via Columbia Records. The album followed the group's previous success with Hangin' Tough (1988) and marked an effort to maintain and expand their popularity through a mix of pop, dance, and ballad-oriented tracks. It was accompanied by a significant marketing campaign and supported by a worldwide tour.

The album was a commercial success, debuting at number one on both the Billboard 200 and the UK Albums Chart. It produced several singles, including the title track "Step by Step", which topped the Billboard Hot 100 for three weeks. The group also released a concert video under the same name, Step by Step, to further promote the album.

Despite its commercial performance, the album received mixed critical reception. While some reviewers acknowledged its production value and appeal to teen audiences, others criticized the album for its formulaic content and perceived lack of innovation. The group's marketing approach and image were also topics of discussion among critics.

== Background and release ==
Following the massive success of Hangin' Tough, Step by Step was seen as an opportunity for New Kids on the Block to reinforce their dominance in the pop music scene. Columbia Records anticipated strong sales and reportedly ordered more than two million copies of the album prior to its release. Simultaneously with the release of the album, CBS Music Video put out the group's third home video, also called Step by Step, which had more than 500,000 advance orders, becoming the largest initial shipment of home videos of the company. In Brazil, the VHS sold over 10,000 copies, becoming a success in the country, what led them being invited to perform at Rock in Rio II.

The single "Step by Step" became the group's biggest hit, spending three weeks at number one on the Billboard Hot 100 and helping propel the album to multi-platinum status in both the United States and internationally.

As part of a broad merchandising strategy, the album's release coincided with a wide range of branded products, including pillowcases, dolls, trading cards, and their Saturday morning cartoon with their name and likeness. The group embarked on a major tour called The Magic Summer Tour to promote the album, aiming to solidify their global presence.

== Musical style and themes ==
Musically, Step by Step includes a blend of upbeat pop tracks, dance songs, and ballads. The production incorporates elements such as disco strings, reggae inflections, and rock-inspired guitar riffs. Tracks like "Games" reflect a tougher edge, influenced by the group's Boston origins and their association with producers and musicians from the area. Other songs, such as "Tonight", draw inspiration from artists like Paul McCartney and explore themes of transition and maturity.

The album features both group and solo performances. Members such as Jordan Knight and Donnie Wahlberg take lead vocals on various tracks, allowing for a more diversified vocal presentation. Lyrics across the album address themes ranging from romantic longing to personal affirmation, with songs like "Baby, I Believe in You" and "Let's Try It Again" highlighting the group's emphasis on emotional expression.

Despite the use of a wide array of musical styles—including ballads, reggae, and doo-wop-inspired songs like "Happy Birthday"—critics noted that the album's production maintained a strong focus on mainstream appeal. This focus, driven largely by marketing considerations, led to a sound that some described as synthetic or calculated.

== Critical reception ==
Professional ratings
Review scores
Source	Rating
AllMusic	3/5 stars
Entertainment Weekly	C+
Rolling Stone	2/5 stars
Smash Hits	8/10

Step by Step received a mixed response from critics upon its release. According to AllMusic, some tracks were noted for their attempt at a more serious or harder-sounding tone, but the album as a whole did not replicate the success of previous hits like "Hangin' Tough". The title track achieved commercial success and topped the charts, yet reviewers expressed skepticism about the artistic direction of the overall project.

Entertainment Weekly offered a more detailed critique, suggesting that the album was primarily structured around its commercial function rather than any particular musical innovation. The magazine noted the formulaic nature of the songs, which it argued were designed to appeal specifically to teenage girls, and criticized the superficial lyrical content and synthetic production techniques. The review highlighted "Stay With Me Baby" as an example of reggae influence but remarked that it lacked authenticity and grit.

In a comprehensive review by Rolling Stone, the album was analyzed in the context of the group's image and industry strategy. The critic pointed out that New Kids on the Block relied heavily on pre-set roles and targeted marketing, with little variation in musical content. Songs such as "Call It What You Want" were described as attempts to introduce R&B and soul elements into the group's sound, though the review argued that these efforts felt forced and market-driven rather than organic. The same review acknowledged that while the group's vocal arrangements and harmonies were polished, they rarely strayed from a commercially safe formula.

== 35th Anniversary edition ==
The group released a 35th Anniversary edition of the album on June 13, 2025. The album contains thirteen bonus tracks which include two unreleased songs along with live and remix versions of some of the songs. Some of the remixes can also be found on No More Games/The Remix Album. The album was also released on vinyl for the first time since the album's original release in 1990.

== Track listing ==
All tracks are written by Maurice Starr, unless otherwise noted.

Step by Step track listing
No.	Title	Writer(s)	Lead vocals	Length
1.	"Step by Step"		Jordan Knight: Additional Steps: Danny Wood, Donnie Wahlberg, Joe McIntyre, and Jonathan Knight	4:29
2.	"Tonight"	Al Lancellotti/Starr	New Kids on the Block	3:28
3.	"Baby, I Believe in You"		Jordan Knight	4:42
4.	"Call It What You Want"		Jordan Knight, Donnie Wahlberg, Joe McIntyre	4:12
5.	"Let's Try It Again"		Danny Wood, Jordan Knight	3:53
6.	"Happy Birthday"	Starr/Michael Jonzun	Jonathan Knight	2:48
7.	"Games"	Donnie Wahlberg/Starr	Donnie Wahlberg, Jordan Knight and Joey McIntyre	3:29
8.	"Time Is on Our Side"	Lancellotti/Starr	Donnie Walhberg	3:49
9.	"Where Do I Go from Here?"		Joe McIntyre	3:50
10.	"Stay with Me Baby"		Donnie Wahlberg	4:21
11.	"Funny Feeling"		Joe McIntyre, Jordan Knight	3:50
12.	"Never Gonna Fall in Love Again"	Danny Wood/T. Ra/Taharqa Aleem/Starr	Danny Wood, Donnie Wahlberg	5:07
Total length:				47:44

35 Anniversary bonus track listing
No.	Title	Writer(s)	Lead vocals	Length
13.	"Honey Don't You Leave Me" (Unreleased)	Maurice Starr/James Brown/Bud Hobgood	Jordan Knight	3:18
14.	"I Love My Girl" (Unreleased)		Jonathan Knight, Jordan Knight	3:38
15.	"Where Do I Go from Here?" (Live at the Molson Amphitheater, Toronto, Canada - August 18, 2024)			2:18
16.	"Step by Step" (12" Club Remix)			5:25
17.	"Tonight" (12" Single Remix)			4:49
18.	"Games" (The Kids Get Hard Mix)			5:23
19.	"Call It What You Want" (The C&C Pump-It Mix)			6:32
20.	"Baby, I Believe in You" (The Love Mix)			4:56
21.	"Step by Step" (The C&C Vocal Club Mix)			6:08
22.	"Never Gonna Fall in Love Again" (The C&C Music Factory Mix)			6:24
23.	"Tonight" (7" Single Remix)			3:10
24.	"Games" (The Kids Get Hard Mix) (Edit)			3:34
25.	"Step by Step" (Instrumental)			4:20

== Charts ==
=== Weekly charts ===
Weekly chart performance for Step by Step
Chart (1990–1991)	Peak position
Australian Albums (ARIA)	4
Austrian Albums (Ö3 Austria)	6
Canada Top Albums/CDs (RPM)	1
Dutch Albums (Album Top 100)	11
European Albums Chart	1
Finnish Albums (Suomen virallinen lista)	3
French Albums (SNEP)	6
German Albums (Offizielle Top 100)	1
Hungarian Albums (MAHASZ)	14
Icelandic Albums (Tónlist)	8
Irish Albums (IRMA)	6
Italian Albums (Musica e dischi)	13
Japanese Albums (Oricon)	10
New Zealand Albums (RMNZ)	1
Norwegian Albums (VG-lista)	4
Spanish Albums (PROMUSICAE)	8
Swedish Albums (Sverigetopplistan)	12
Swiss Albums (Schweizer Hitparade)	8
UK Albums (Official Charts)	1
US Billboard 200	1
Zimbabwean Albums (ZIMA)	8

=== Year-end charts ===
Year-end chart performance for Step by Step
Chart (1990)	Position
Australian Albums Chart	54
Austrian Albums Chart	20
Canadian Albums Chart	12
Dutch Albums Chart	48
European Albums (Music & Media)	9
French Albums Chart	10
Italian Albums Chart	69
New Zealand Albums Chart	17
Norwegian Albums Chart (Sommer Period)	6
Swiss Albums Chart	26
UK Albums Chart	20
US Albums Chart	34
Chart (1991)	Position
European Albums (Music & Media)	85

== Certifications and sales ==
Certifications and sales for Step by Step
Region	Certification	Certified units/sales
Australia (ARIA)	Gold	35,000^{^}
Austria (IFPI Austria)	Platinum	50,000^{*}
Brazil (Pro-Música Brasil)	Gold	500,000
Canada (Music Canada)	7× Platinum	700,000^{^}
Finland (Musiikkituottajat)	Gold	50,100
France (SNEP)	Platinum	300,000^{*}
Germany (BVMI)	Platinum	500,000^{^}
Japan (RIAJ)	Platinum	200,000^{^}
Malaysia	—	25,000
Netherlands (NVPI)	Gold	50,000^{^}
New Zealand (RMNZ)	Platinum	15,000^{^}
Spain (Promusicae)	Platinum	100,000^{^}
Sweden (GLF)	Gold	50,000^{^}
Switzerland (IFPI Switzerland)	Platinum	50,000^{^}
United Kingdom (BPI)	Platinum	300,000^{^}
United States (RIAA)	3× Platinum	3,000,000^{^}
United States (RIAA) Music videocassette	Platinum	100,000^{^}
^{*} Sales figures based on certification alone.^{^} Shipments figures based on certification alone.
