= Be My Girl (New Kids on the Block song) =

Single by New Kids on the Block

from the album New Kids on the Block
- Released: March 5, 1986
- Recorded: 1985
- Genre: Pop
- Length: 3:54
- Label: Columbia
- Songwriter(s): Maurice Starr
- Producer(s): Maurice Starr

New Kids on the Block singles chronology
"Be My Girl" (1986)	"Stop It Girl" (1986)

"Be My Girl" is the 1986 debut single by New Kids on the Block, with lead vocals by Donnie Wahlberg. Written and produced by Maurice Starr, it was the group's first release from their self-titled album New Kids on the Block. Although it received marginal airplay in their hometown of Boston, it was largely ignored nationally and failed to chart on the Billboard Hot 100.

== Track listing ==
=== 7" single ===
A-side

1. "Be My Girl" (Vocal) - 3:54
2. "Be My Girl" (Instrumental) - 3:54

B-side

1. "Be My Girl" (Extended mix) - 4:50

== Charts ==
Chart (1986)	Peak position
US Hot R&B/Hip-Hop Songs (Billboard)	90

== Personnel ==
- Donnie Wahlberg - lead vocals
- Danny Wood - backing vocals
- Joey McIntyre - backing vocals
- Jonathan Knight - backing vocals
- Jordan Knight - backing vocals
- Maurice Starr - backing vocals, all instruments
