= Merry, Merry Christmas =

Studio album by New Kids on the Block
- Released: September 19, 1989
- Recorded: 1988–1989
- Genres: Pop, holiday
- Length: 42:17
- Label: Columbia
- Producer: Maurice Starr

New Kids on the Block chronology
Hangin' Tough (1988)	Merry, Merry Christmas (1989)	Step by Step (1990)

Singles from Merry, Merry Christmas
- 1. "This One's for the Children" Released: October 12, 1989

Professional ratings
Review scores
Source	Rating
AllMusic	3/5 stars
Smash Hits	8/10

Merry, Merry Christmas is the third studio and only Christmas album by pop band New Kids on the Block, released in the United States by Columbia Records on September 19, 1989. It features seasonal songs, both cover versions and original material. Released at a time when the band was peaking, it went double platinum and spawned the top-ten single, "This One's for the Children", which Maurice Starr produced and recorded at Tony Rose’s Hit City Recording Studio in Roxbury, Massachusetts.

The deathcore band I Declare War used the same album cover image for a Christmas themed EP they released titled Bring the Season (2007).

== Track listing ==
Merry, Merry Christmas track listing
No.	Title	Writer(s)	Lead vocals	Length
1.	"This One's for the Children"	Maurice Starr	Jordan Knight, Donnie Wahlberg	3:54
2.	"Last Night I Saw Santa Claus"	Al Lancellotti, Starr	Donnie Wahlberg	3:31
3.	"I'll Be Missin You Come Christmas (A Letter to Santa)"	Kenny Nolan, Starr	Donnie Wahlberg, Jordan Knight, Joe McIntyre	5:06
4.	"I Still Believe in Santa Claus"	Al Lancellotti, Starr	Joe McIntyre, Danny Wood	3:24
5.	"Merry, Merry Christmas"	Al Lancellotti, Starr	New Kids on the Block	4:08
6.	"The Christmas Song"	Mel Tormé, Robert Wells	Jordan Knight	4:18
7.	"Funky, Funky Xmas"	Donnie Wahlberg, Starr	Jordan Knight, Joe McIntyre, Danny Wood, Donnie Wahlberg	5:06
8.	"White Christmas"	Irving Berlin	Jonathan Knight	3:40
9.	"The Little Drummer Boy"	Harry Simeone, Henry Onorati, Katherine K. Davis	Danny Wood	4:14
10.	"This One's for the Children" (reprise)	Starr	Jordan Knight, Donnie Wahlberg	1:12
Total length:				36:58

== Charts ==
=== Weekly charts ===
Weekly chart performance for Merry, Merry Christmas
Chart (1989)	Peak position
Australian Albums (ARIA)	34
Austrian Albums (Ö3 Austria)	13
Canadian Albums (RPM)	15
Dutch Albums (Album Top 100)	76
European Albums Chart	31
Finnish Albums (Suomen virallinen lista)	13
German Albums (Offizielle Top 100)	30
Japanese Albums (Oricon)	33
Norwegian Albums (VG-lista)	16
Swedish Albums (Sverigetopplistan)	43
UK Albums (Official Charts)	13
US Billboard 200	9

=== Year-end charts ===
1989 year-end chart performance for Merry, Merry Christmas
Chart (1989)	Position
Canadian Albums Chart	88

1990 year-end chart performance for Merry, Merry Christmas
Chart (1990)	Position
US Billboard 200	99

== Certifications and sales ==
Certifications for Merry, Merry Christmas
Region	Certification	Certified units/sales
Canada (Music Canada)	2× Platinum	200,000^{^}
Finland (Musiikkituottajat)	Gold	28,609
United Kingdom (BPI)	Gold	100,000^{^}
United States (RIAA)	2× Platinum	2,000,000^{^}
^{^} Shipments figures based on certification alone.
