= Let's Try It Again =

Single by New Kids on the Block

from the album Step by Step
- A-side: "Didn't I (Blow Your Mind)"; (double A-side in the UK and Ireland)
- Released: September 20, 1990
- Recorded: 1989
- Genre: Pop, R&B
- Length: 3:51
- Label: Columbia
- Songwriter: Maurice Starr
- Producer: Maurice Starr

New Kids on the Block singles chronology
"Tonight" (1990)	"Let's Try It Again" (1990)	"Games" (1990)

"Let's Try It Again" is a song performed by New Kids on the Block. Written and produced by Maurice Starr, it was the fourth and final single from the group's third album, Step by Step, released in the fall of 1990. It contains shared lead vocals by Danny Wood and Jordan Knight.

== Reception ==
After having scored another big hit with the title track and its well-received top 10 follow-up "Tonight" from their number one album Step by Step, the group's momentum subsequently slowed down in the fall of 1990. Largely blamed on overwhelming media saturation, which included an animated cartoon series during the same period, a growing public and industry backlash against the group ensued. Upon the release of "Let's Try It Again", many radio stations rejected the song, while others quickly dropped it from their playlist after a few weeks. As a result, it became group's first single since 1986's "Stop It Girl" that failed to peak within the top 40 in the United States; peaking instead at number fifty-three.

== Track listings ==
7" single

1. "Let's Try It Again" – 3:51
2. "Didn't I (Blow Your Mind)" – 4:24

== Charts ==
Chart performance for "Let's Try It Again"
Chart (1990–1991)	Peak position
Australia (ARIA)	51
Belgium (Ultratop 50 Flanders)	32
Canada Top Singles (RPM)	60
Europe (Eurochart Hot 100)	29
Finland (Suomen virallinen lista)	28
France (SNEP)	15
France Airplay (SNEP)	10
Germany (Official German Charts)	68
Ireland (IRMA)	6
Israel (IBA)	17
Luxembourg (Radio Luxembourg)	3
Netherlands (Dutch Top 40)	25
Netherlands (Single Top 100)	17
New Zealand (Recorded Music NZ)	31
UK Singles (Official Charts)	8
US Billboard Hot 100	53
