= New Kids on the Block (album) =

Studio album by New Kids on the Block
- Released: April 1, 1986
- Recorded: 1985–1986
- Genres: Bubblegum pop; R&B
- Length: 42:43
- Labels: Columbia; CBS
- Producer: Maurice Starr

New Kids on the Block chronology
New Kids on the Block (1986)	Hangin' Tough (1988)

Singles from New Kids on the Block
- 1. "Be My Girl" Released: March 5, 1986; 2. "Stop It Girl" Released: July 6, 1986; 3. "Didn't I (Blow Your Mind This Time)" Released: August 11, 1989

Professional ratings
Review scores
Source	Rating
AllMusic	3/5 stars

New Kids on the Block is the debut studio album from American pop boy band New Kids on the Block released on April 1, 1986, by Columbia Records. The album failed to garner any attention at the time of its release. In August 1989, during the success of their second album, Hangin' Tough, Columbia released the New Kids on the Block track "Didn't I (Blow Your Mind)" as a single, in an attempt to bring this album to the attention of the group's growing fan-base. As a result, album sales spiked, causing it to be released outside the United States around the same time. Subsequently, the New Kids on the Block album would eventually be certified 3× Platinum by the RIAA, peaking at number 25 on the US Billboard 200.

== Track listing ==
New Kids on the Block track listing
No.	Title	Writer(s)	Lead vocals	Length
1.	"Stop It Girl"	Maurice Starr	Donnie Wahlberg; Joey McIntyre; rap by Mark Wahlberg	3:43
2.	"Didn't I (Blow Your Mind)"	Thom Bell; William Hart	Jordan Knight; secondary by D. Wahlberg; McIntyre; spoken by Danny Wood	4:24
3.	"Popsicle"	Starr	McIntyre; Jordan Knight; rap by New Kids on the Block	4:49
4.	"Angel"	Starr; James Cappra	McIntyre; D. Wahlberg; Jordan Knight	3:32
5.	"Be My Girl"	Starr	D. Wahlberg	3:55
6.	"New Kids on the Block"	Starr; D. Wahlberg	D. Wahlberg	3:22
7.	"Are You Down?"	D.W Wahlberg; A.J.; Erik Nuri; Kenneth Banks	New Kids on the Block	5:00
8.	"I Wanna Be Loved by You"	Starr	New Kids on the Block	4:56
9.	"Don't Give Up on Me"	Starr	D. Wahlberg; McIntyre; Phaedra Butler; Jordan Knight	4:45
10.	"Treat Me Right"	Starr	McIntyre	4:17

== Personnel ==
New Kids on the Block

- Jordan Knight – lead and backing vocals
- Jonathan Knight – lead and backing vocals
- Joey McIntyre – lead and backing vocals
- Donnie Wahlberg – lead and backing vocals
- Danny Wood – lead and backing vocals

Production

- Larkin Arnold – executive producer
- Paul Arnold – engineer
- Christopher Austopchuk – art direction
- Sidney Burton – engineer, mixing
- Phaedra Butler – backing vocals and duet vocals on "Don't Give Up on Me"
- Pat Costa – engineer
- William Garrett – engineer
- Phil Greene – engineer, mixing
- Caroline Greyshock – photography
- Frank Heller – engineer, mixing
- Jimmy Johnson – conga
- Erik Nuri – executive producer
- Maurice Starr – producer and all instruments
- Christopher Rich – beat box
- Gordon Worthy – keyboards

== Charts ==
=== Weekly charts ===
Weekly chart performance for New Kids on the Block
Chart (1989–1990)	Peak position
Australian Albums (ARIA)	146
Canadian Albums (RPM)	17
European Albums Chart	31
Finnish Albums (Suomen virallinen lista)	34
French Albums (SNEP)	8
Japanese Albums (Oricon)	58
UK Albums (Official Charts)	6
US Billboard 200	25

=== Year-end charts ===
Year-end chart performance for New Kids on the Block
Chart (1990)	Position
Canadian Albums Chart	87
US Billboard 200	36

== Certifications ==
Certifications for New Kids on the Block
Region	Certification	Certified units/sales
Canada (Music Canada)	3× Platinum	300,000^{^}
United Kingdom (BPI)	Gold	100,000^{^}
United States (RIAA)	3× Platinum	3,000,000^{^}
^{^} Shipments figures based on certification alone.

== Footnotes ==
- The group was originally named Nynuk. The name was changed to New Kids on the Block following the recording of the Donnie Wahlberg-written album track of the same name.
