= Call It What You Want (New Kids on the Block song) =

Single by New Kids on the Block

from the album No More Games/The Remix Album and Step By Step
- Released: January 27, 1991
- Recorded: 1989
- Genre: Hip house
- Length: 6:31 (album version); 4:12 (radio edit)
- Label: Columbia
- Songwriter: Maurice Starr
- Producers: Maurice Starr (original version); Robert Clivillés & David Cole (remix)

New Kids on the Block singles chronology
"Games" (1990)	"Call It What You Want" (1991)	"Baby, I Believe in You" (1991)

"Call It What You Want" is a 1991 song by New Kids on the Block. Written and produced by Maurice Starr, the original version appears on the group's third album Step By Step. A club/house remix produced by Robert Clivillés & David Cole, which also featured a rap intro by Freedom Williams, later appeared on the group's 1990 hits compilation, No More Games/The Remix Album and would ultimately serve as the second single to be released from that album. The lead vocals were sung by Jordan Knight, Joey McIntyre, and Donnie Wahlberg.

== Release and reception ==
Upon its release, the song was another single that received decent (though not enthusiastic) airplay in North America during the spring months of 1991 and could be considered the "last hurrah" in terms of singles from the group's initial run. The single peaked at #12 on the UK Singles Chart. While the group played this song in concert during their 1994 Face the Music Tour, it was not played again until the New Kids on the Block: Live tour on March 7, 2009.

== Version ==
- "Call It What You Want (C&C Pump-It Mix) - 6:31
- "Call It What You Want (C&C Pump-It Mix) [Radio Edit] - 4:12
- "Call It What You Want (Original Version) - 4:11

== Charts ==
Chart performance for "Call It What You Want"
Chart (1991)	Peak position
Australia (ARIA)	57
Belgium (Ultratop 50 Flanders)	22
Finland (Suomen virallinen lista)	19
Ireland (IRMA)	8
Israel (Israeli Singles Chart)	5
Luxembourg (Radio Luxembourg)	8
Netherlands (Dutch Top 40)	17
Netherlands (Single Top 100)	17
New Zealand (Recorded Music NZ)	45
Spain Airplay (Top 40 Radio)	7
Sweden (Sverigetopplistan)	24
UK Singles (Official Charts)	12
UK Airplay (Music Week)	12

=== Year-end charts ===
Chart (1991)	Position
Israel (Israeli Singles Chart)	75
