= Stop It Girl =

Single by New Kids on the Block

from the album New Kids on the Block
- Released: July 6, 1986
- Recorded: 1985
- Genre: Bubblegum pop
- Length: 3:45
- Label: Columbia
- Songwriter(s): Maurice Starr
- Producer(s): Maurice Starr

New Kids on the Block singles chronology
"Be My Girl" (1986)	"Stop It Girl" (1986)	"Didn't I (Blow Your Mind)" (1986)

"Stop It Girl" is a 1986 single from New Kids on the Block. Written and produced by Maurice Starr, it was the second release from their debut album New Kids on the Block.

== Track listing ==
US Vinyl, 12"

- A Stop It Girl [Extended Dance Mix] 5:18
- B Stop It Girl [Radio Edit] 3:47

== Personnel ==
- Danny Wood
- Donnie Wahlberg
- Joey McIntyre
- Jonathan Knight
- Jordan Knight
