= Tonight (New Kids on the Block song) =

Single by New Kids on the Block

from the album Step by Step
- B-side: "Hold On"
- Released: July 26, 1990
- Length: 3:26
- Label: Columbia
- Songwriters: Maurice Starr; Al Lancellotti
- Producer: Maurice Starr

New Kids on the Block singles chronology
| "Valentine Girl" (1990) | "Tonight" (1990) | "Let's Try It Again" (1990) |

"Tonight" is a song by American pop band New Kids on the Block, released in July 1990 by Columbia Records as the third single from their fourth album, Step by Step (1990). It was written by Maurice Starr and Al Lancellotti and produced by Starr. A big hit on both sides of the Atlantic, the song first reached number seven on the US Billboard Hot 100 (becoming their 9th and last top 10), and then number three on the UK Singles Chart following its American success.

"Tonight" is "half slow tempo, half ska" and is mostly sung in unison by all five members of the group until the "la la..." section of the chorus. The song "discusses the relationship that binds the members of the group to their fans, since the beginning", with many references to their earlier hits in the first couplet. Most of the song is heavily influenced by various songs of the Beatles.

== Track listings ==
- US and Canada 7-inch single
1. "Tonight" – 3:27
2. "Hold On" – 3:36
- 7-inch single and picture disc
1. "Tonight" – 3:26
2. "Hold on" – 3:36
- 12-inch maxi and CD maxi
1. "Tonight" – 3:27
2. "Hold on" – 3:36
3. "Don't Give Up on Me" – 4:45

== Charts ==
=== Weekly charts ===
| Chart (1990) | Peak position |
|---|---|
| Australia (ARIA) | 16 |
| Austria (Ö3 Austria Top 40) | 12 |
| Belgium (Ultratop 50 Flanders) | 4 |
| Canada Top Singles (RPM) | 8 |
| Europe (Eurochart Hot 100) | 8 |
| Europe (European Hit Radio) | 4 |
| Finland (Suomen virallinen lista) | 18 |
| France (SNEP) | 3 |
| France Airplay (SNEP) | 2 |
| Germany (GfK) | 19 |
| Ireland (IRMA) | 8 |
| Israel (Israeli Singles Chart) | 19 |
| Luxembourg (Radio Luxembourg) | 4 |
| Netherlands (Dutch Top 40) | 4 |
| Netherlands (Single Top 100) | 3 |
| New Zealand (Recorded Music NZ) | 16 |
| Spain Airplay (Top 40 Radio) | 2 |
| Sweden (Sverigetopplistan) | 11 |
| UK Singles (Official Charts) | 3 |
| UK Airplay (Music Week) | 3 |
| US Billboard Hot 100 | 7 |
| Zimbabwe (ZIMA) | 9 |

=== Year-end charts ===
| Chart (1990) | Position |
|---|---|
| Australia (ARIA) | 83 |
| Belgium (Ultratop) | 24 |
| Canada Top Singles (RPM) | 82 |
| Europe (Eurochart Hot 100) | 62 |
| Europe (European Hit Radio) | 28 |
| France Airplay (SNEP) | 30 |
| Netherlands (Dutch Top 40) | 37 |
| Netherlands (Single Top 100) | 40 |
| Sweden (Topplistan) | 70 |
| UK Singles (OCC) | 39 |

| Chart (1991) | Position |
|---|---|
| Europe (Eurochart Hot 100) | 89 |

== Certifications and sales ==
| Region | Certification | Certified units/sales |
|---|---|---|
| France (SNEP) | Silver | 200,000^{*} |
^{*} Sales figures based on certification alone.
