= This One's for the Children =

Single by New Kids on the Block

from the album Merry, Merry Christmas
- B-side: "Funky, Funky Xmas"
- Released: October 12, 1989
- Recorded: 1988
- Genre: Pop
- Length: 3:54
- Label: Columbia
- Songwriter: Maurice Starr
- Producer: Maurice Starr

New Kids on the Block singles chronology
| "Cover Girl" (1989) | "This One's for the Children" (1989) | "Step by Step" (1990) |

"This One's for the Children" is a song by American boy band New Kids on the Block, and is written and produced by Maurice Starr. The lead vocals are sung by band members Jordan Knight and Donnie Wahlberg. Taken from the group's holiday album, Merry, Merry Christmas (1989), the single was released in October 1989 by Columbia Records. It peaked at number seven on the US Billboard Hot 100 in January 1990, and number nine on the UK Singles Chart 11 months later.

Featured on the song's B-side was "Funky, Funky Xmas", which was an airplay only single promoted during the holiday season. The rap/lead vocals were sung by Jordan Knight, Joey McIntyre, Danny Wood, and Donnie Wahlberg.

== Music video ==
The accompanying music video starts with different languages saying "This One's for the Children". It features the band near a piano with Jordan Knight playing it and co-singing with Donnie Wahlberg while showing young children from around the world.

== Charts ==
=== Weekly charts ===
Weekly chart performance for "This One's for the Children"
| Chart (1989–1990) | Peak position |
|---|---|
| Australia (ARIA) | 40 |
| Belgium (Ultratop 50 Flanders) | 40 |
| Canada Top Singles (RPM) | 15 |
| Canada Adult Contemporary (RPM) | 12 |
| Finland (Suomen virallinen lista) | 19 |
| Ireland (IRMA) | 7 |
| Israel (IBA) | 27 |
| Luxembourg (Radio Luxembourg) | 8 |
| Netherlands (Single Top 100) | 71 |
| UK Singles (Official Charts) | 9 |
| UK Airplay (Music Week) | 7 |
| US Billboard Hot 100 | 7 |
| US Adult Contemporary (Billboard) | 27 |
| US Radio & Records CHR/Pop Airplay Chart | 10 |

=== Year-end charts ===
Year-end chart performance for "This One's for the Children"
| Chart (1990) | Position |
|---|---|
| Canada Adult Contemporary (RPM) | 98 |
| US Billboard Hot 100 | 90 |

== Certifications ==
Certifications for "This One's for the Children"
| Region | Certification | Certified units/sales |
|---|---|---|
| United States (RIAA) | Gold | 500,000^{^} |
^{^} Shipments figures based on certification alone.
