= Games (New Kids on the Block song) =

Single by New Kids on the Block

from the album No More Games: The Remix Album
- Released: October 17, 1990
- Recorded: 1989
- Genre: New jack swing
- Length: 3:51
- Label: Columbia
- Songwriters: Maurice Starr; Donnie Wahlberg
- Producers: Maurice Starr; David Cole; Robert Clivillés

New Kids on the Block singles chronology
"Let's Try It Again" (1990)	"Games" (1990)	"Call It What You Want" (1991)

"Games" is a song by American boy band New Kids on the Block, released as the lead single from their first compilation/remix album, No More Games: The Remix Album (1990). Employing hip-hop samples with riffs sung by Jordan Knight, and defensive rhymes by Donnie Wahlberg, the song was a dramatic departure from their previously clean cut sound. It was produced by Maurice Starr, David Cole and Robert Clivillés and also includes shout-outs to Donnie's brother Mark Wahlberg and his group Marky Mark and the Funky Bunch. The song features a chorus section taken from the film The Wizard of Oz, namely the West Witch's soldiers chant: "Oh ee oh, oh oh". The accompanying music video for "Games" received heavy rotation on MTV Europe.

Feeling the name "New Kids on the Block" was too childish for the group, the band shortened their name to "NKOTB" during the time of the single's release. The song received decent airplay from stations nationwide. The song was also included on the 35th Anniversary release of their Step by Step album which was released in 2025.

== Critical reception ==
Terry Staunton from NME wrote, "We have to be pretty honest here. This is probably the best thing they'll ever do and it is strangely adult. There's a touch of early Earth, Wind & Fire to it ("Saturday Night", "Shining Star", that sort of stuff) and it's not altogether dissimilar to Grandmaster Melle Mel's "White Lines". A bit of a corker, I have to admit."

== Track listings ==
- 12" maxi - Promo
1. "Games" (the kids get hard mix) – 5:22
2. "What'cha Gonna Do (About It)" (Arthur Baker remix) – 5:51
3. "Call It What You Want" (C&C pump it mix) – 5:31
4. "My Favorite Girl" (remix) – 5:29
- CD maxi
1. "Games (the kids get hard mix extended version) – 5:22
2. "Games (album version) – 3:27
3. "(You've Got It) The Right Stuff" (New Kids in the house mix) – 5:36
4. "Treat Me Right" – 4:17
- 7" single
1. "Games" (the kids get hard mix 7" mix) – 3:58
2. "Games" (the album version) – 3:27

== Charts ==
Chart (1991)	Peak position
Australia (ARIA)	33
Belgium (Ultratop 50 Flanders)	39
Canada Top Singles (RPM)	52
France (SNEP)	19
France Airplay (SNEP)	54
Ireland (IRMA)	9
Israel (IBA)	10
Luxembourg (Radio Luxembourg)	8
Netherlands (Dutch Top 40)	33
Netherlands (Single Top 100)	30
New Zealand (Recorded Music NZ)	27
Spain Airplay (Top 40 Radio)	11
UK Singles (Official Charts)	14
UK Airplay (Music Week)	14
US Billboard Hot 100 Airplay	58
Zimbabwe (ZIMA)	11
