= Baby, I Believe in You =

Single by New Kids on the Block

from the album Step by Step, No More Games/The Remix Album
- Released: October 22, 1991
- Recorded: 1989
- Genre: Pop
- Length: 4:44
- Label: Columbia
- Songwriter: Maurice Starr

New Kids on the Block singles chronology
"Call It What You Want" (1991)	"Baby, I Believe in You" (1991)	"If You Go Away" (1991)

"Baby, I Believe in You (The Love Mix)" is the third single from American vocal group New Kids on the Block's No More Games/The Remix Album (1990). The lead vocals were sung by Jordan Knight. The Maurice Starr-penned tune was released in Germany on October 22, 1991. It was played again in the 2008 New Kids on the Block reunion tour.

A year after the NKOTB version was first released, American freestyle star George Lamond recorded a cover version for his second album, In My Life (1992). It was also released as a single and peaked at numbers 62 and 66 on the US Cash Box Top 100 and Billboard Hot 100 charts.

== Charts ==
=== NKOTB version ===
Chart performance for "Baby, I Believe in You"
Chart (1991)	Peak position
Australia (ARIA)	91
Netherlands (Single Top 100)	64
New Zealand (Recorded Music NZ)	20

=== George Lamond version ===
Chart performance for "Baby, I Believe in You"
Chart (1992)	Peak position
Billboard Hot 100	66
US Cash Box Top 100	62
