= Valentine Girl =

Single by New Kids on the Block

from the album Greatest Hits
- Released: June 18, 1990
- Recorded: 1989
- Genre: Pop; urban pop
- Length: 4:02
- Label: Columbia
- Songwriter: Maurice Starr
- Producer: Maurice Starr

New Kids on the Block singles chronology
"Step by Step" (1990)	"Valentine Girl" (1990)	"Tonight" (1990)

"Valentine Girl" is a 1990 ballad single by New Kids on the Block, with lead vocals by Danny Wood and Jordan Knight. In the US, it is featured on the B-side to "Step by Step", and was issued as an airplay-only track. However, the song was only officially released as a single in Japan.

The song reached number 15 in Japan on the Oricon Singles Chart.

== Versions ==
- Album version – 4:00
- Radio version – 3:53
- The C&C Quiet Storm Mix – 5:09
