= Step by Step (New Kids on the Block song) =

1990 single by New Kids on the Block

- Single cover

Single by New Kids on the Block

from the album Step by Step
- B-side: "Valentine Girl"
- Released: May 10, 1990
- Genre: Dance-pop; Disco
- Length: 4:29 (album version); 3:58 (radio edit)
- Label: Columbia
- Songwriter: Maurice Starr
- Producer: Maurice Starr

New Kids on the Block singles chronology
"This One's for the Children" (1989)	"Step by Step" (1990)	"Valentine Girl" (1990)

"Step by Step" is a song by American boyband New Kids on the Block, released on May 10, 1990, by Columbia Records as the first single from the album of the same name (1990). It is the group's biggest-selling hit single. The lead vocals were sung by Jordan Knight. Danny Wood sang "Step 1", Donnie Wahlberg sang "Step 2", Jordan Knight sang "Step 3", Joey McIntyre sang "Step 4", and Jonathan Knight sang "Step 5".

"Step by Step" was initially recorded by one of Maurice Starr's other groups, the Superiors. It was released as a single in 1987 on Motown Records, but it was not successful. The New Kids cover of the song on the other hand was a huge worldwide hit, becoming one of the biggest selling singles of 1990. The New Kids on the Block's cover spent three weeks at No. 1 on the US Billboard Hot 100 as well as topping the US Cash Box Top 100, and was eventually certified platinum. It also reached No. 1 in Canada, peaked at No. 2 in the United Kingdom, and entered the top 10 in the Australia, France, Ireland, Norway, and West Germany. Its accompanying music video was directed by Larry Jordan.

== Critical reception ==
Bill Coleman from Billboard magazine wrote, "Unstoppable teen idols preview upcoming album of the same name with a perky pop/dance confection rife with disco-era string fills. The phenomenon continues." Greg Sandow from Entertainment Weekly praised "Step by Step" as "a wonderfully ingratiating morsel of pop. It’s nourished by a chugging beat and (for dessert, so to speak) offers perky disco strings and a brief flash of silver falsetto from New Kid Jordan Knight."

Ben Thompson from NME commented, "The New Kids can be forgiven a certain caution as to where they are putting their feet, given their recent run-in with a malevolent cuddly toy. Excepting some nice Saturday Night Fever fake strings, all potential points of interest have been relentlessly expunged from this record." In their review of the album, People Magazine found that the music "is in fact better in spots than on their previous effort", noting that the song is "funkier". Rolling Stone described it as "a peppy reintroduction to the group that breaks up its generalized pledges of devotion with quick spots from each member, one-liners coyly called "ad libs" on the lyric sheet, although they're faithfully printed. (Nothing but nothing on this record happens by chance.)"

== Music video ==
The music video for "Step by Step" was directed by American director Larry Jordan. Donnie's brother Mark Wahlberg also appears in the video.

== Impact and legacy ==
"Step by Step" was voted No. 4 in a Smash Hits poll of "Best Boyband songs...Ever" and also made the list of the top 30 Guilty Pleasures on About.com's music site. The song was voted No. 7 in a viewer poll of the greatest boy band/girl band songs on New Zealand show UChoose40. It was also voted No. 1 in a viewer poll of the greatest Guilty Pleasures on the same show.

In August 2007, it was confirmed that "Step by Step" would be part of a 30-song track list in the new edition of the SingStar series titled SingStar 90s, a karaoke style game on classic '90s songs. In January 2015, Heat magazine's TV Channel placed it at No. 17 in their "Greatest Boyband Anthems" countdown.

== Track listings ==
- US and Canadian 7-inch single
1. "Step by Step" - 4:27
2. "Valentine Girl" - 3:57
- CD single
1. "Step by Step" - 4:27
2. "Valentine Girl" - 3:57
- Maxi-CD
1. "Step by Step" (Radio Edit) - 3:59
2. "Step by Step" (LP Version) - 4:27
3. "Step by Step" (12" Club Remix) - 5:25

== Charts ==
=== Weekly charts ===
Chart (1990–1991)	Peak position
Australia (ARIA)	8
Austria (Ö3 Austria Top 40)	12
Belgium (Ultratop 50 Flanders)	6
Canada Retail Singles (The Record)	1
Canada Top Singles (RPM)	1
Canada Adult Contemporary (RPM)	19
Europe (Eurochart Hot 100)	5
Europe (European Hit Radio)	2
Finland (Suomen virallinen lista)	7
Finland Airplay (Radiosoittolista)	2
France (SNEP)	10
France Airplay (SNEP)	4
Greece (IFPI)	2
Ireland (IRMA)	5
Israel (Israeli Singles Chart)	4
Italy (Musica e dischi)	22
Luxembourg (Radio Luxembourg)	1
Netherlands (Dutch Top 40)	12
Netherlands (Single Top 100)	13
New Zealand (Recorded Music NZ)	3
Norway (VG-lista)	3
Singapore (SPVA)	10
Spain Airplay (Top 40 Radio)	1
Sweden (Sverigetopplistan)	13
Switzerland (Schweizer Hitparade)	17
UK Singles (Official Charts)	2
UK Airplay (Music Week)	2
US Billboard Hot 100	1
US Dance Singles Sales (Billboard)	35
US Hot R&B/Hip-Hop Songs (Billboard)	48
US Cash Box Top 100	1
West Germany (GfK)	8
Zimbabwe (ZIMA)	10

=== Year-end charts ===
Chart (1990)	Position
Australia (ARIA)	33
Belgium (Ultratop)	52
Canada Top Singles (RPM)	17
Europe (Eurochart Hot 100)	33
Europe (European Hit Radio)	30
France Airplay (SNEP)	47
Germany (Media Control)	43
Israel (Israeli Singles Chart)	8
Italy (Musica e dischi)	91
Netherlands (Single Top 100)	81
New Zealand (RIANZ)	22
Sweden (Topplistan)	51
US Billboard Hot 100	33
US Cash Box Top 100	29

=== Decade-end charts ===
Chart (1990–1999)	Position
Canada (Nielsen SoundScan)	46

== Certifications ==
Region	Certification	Certified units/sales
Australia (ARIA)	Gold	35,000^{^}
Canada (Music Canada)	Platinum	100,000^{^}
France (SNEP)	Silver	200,000^{*}
Japan (RIAJ)	Gold	50,000^{^}
United Kingdom (BPI)	Silver	200,000^{^}
United States (RIAA)	Platinum	1,000,000^{^}
^{*} Sales figures based on certification alone.^{^} Shipments figures based on certification alone.
