= Bailey Zimmerman discography =

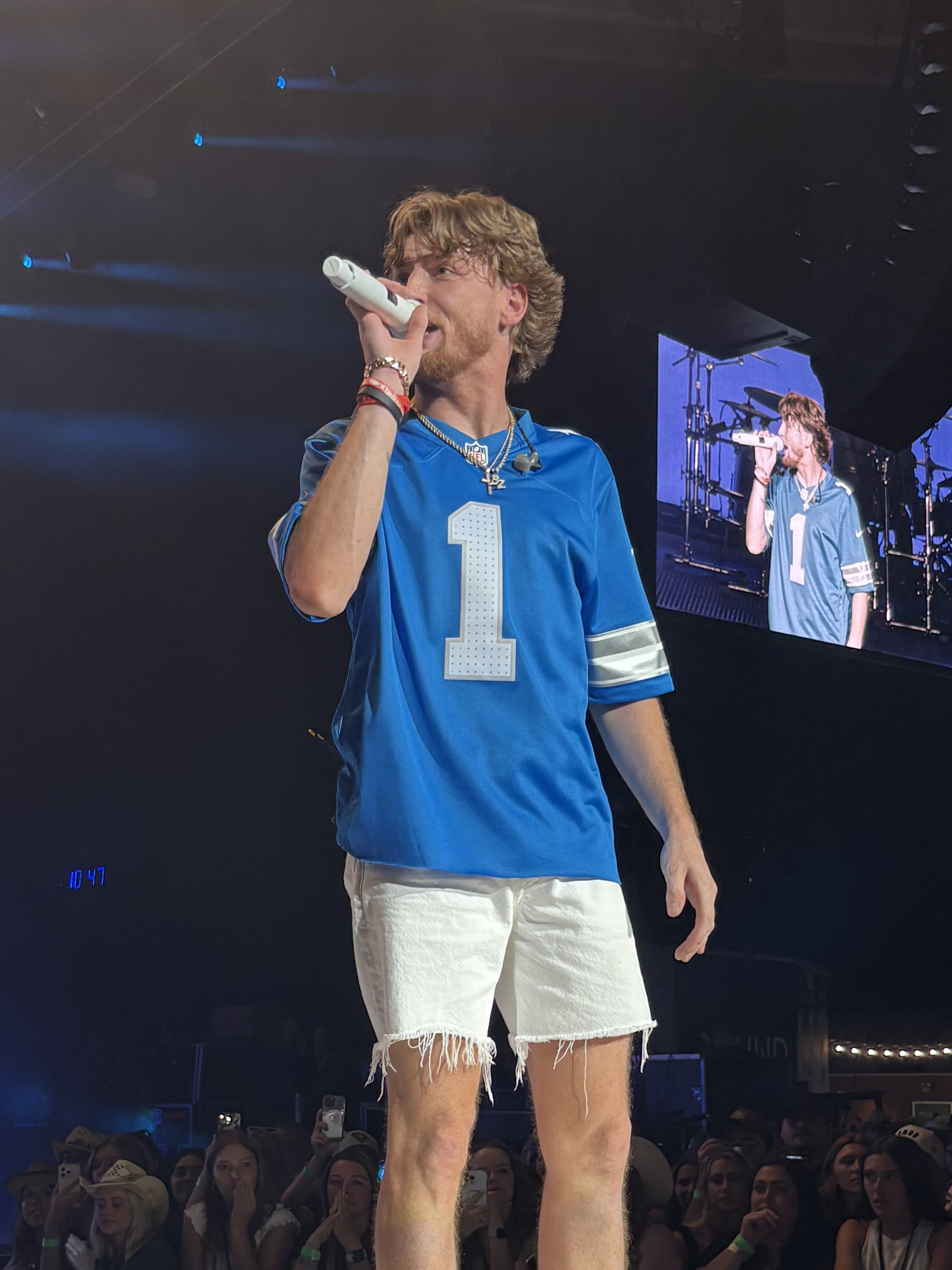
- Bailey Zimmerman in 2025
- Studio albums: 2
- EPs: 1
- Compilation albums: 1
- Singles: 12

American musician Bailey Zimmerman has released two studio albums, one extended play, and twelve singles, counting collaborations. In addition, he has charted and certified a number of non-single tracks.

Zimmerman debuted in 2022 with "Fall in Love", initially released from the EP Leave the Light On before also being included on his debut Religiously. The Album. "Fall in Love" peaked at number one on Billboard Country Airplay. The project's next three singles, "Rock and a Hard Place", "Religiously", and "Where It Ends", did likewise. In 2025, he released his second studio album Different Night Same Rodeo, which includes the singles "Holy Smokes" and "Backup Plan". In addition, he was featured on BigXthaPlug's 2025 single "All the Way", which reached number one on the Hot Country Songs song at the start of 2025.

== Studio albums ==
Title	Details	Peak chart positions				Certifications
Title	Details	US	US Country	AUS	CAN	Certifications
Religiously. The Album.	Released: May 12, 2023; Label: Warner Nashville, Elektra; Formats: CD, cassette, vinyl, digital download, streaming	7	3	25	8	RIAA: 2× Platinum; ARIA: Gold; MC: 3× Platinum; RMNZ: Gold
Different Night Same Rodeo	Released: August 8, 2025; Label: Warner Nashville, Elektra; Formats: CD, cassette, vinyl, digital download, streaming	12	3	77	10	MC: Gold

== Extended plays ==
List of extended plays, with selected details and chart positions
Title	EP details	Peak chart positions				Certifications
Title	EP details	US	US Country	AUS	CAN	Certifications
Leave the Light On	Release date: October 14, 2022; Label: Warner Nashville, Elektra; Formats: CD, digital download, streaming	9	2	95	8	MC: 2× Platinum

== Singles ==
=== As lead artist ===
List of singles, with year released, selected chart positions, and album name shown
Title	Year	Peak chart positions								Certifications	Album
Title	Year	US	US Country	US Country Airplay	AUS	CAN	CAN Country	NZ Hot	WW	Certifications	Album
"Fall in Love"	2022	29	5	1	—	64	1	—	117	RIAA: 6× Platinum; MC: 7× Platinum; RMNZ: Platinum	Religiously. The Album. (Note: "Fall in Love" and "Rock and a Hard Place" first appeared on the 2022 EP Leave the Light On before officially appearing on an album.)
"Rock and a Hard Place"	2022	10	2	1	41	17	1	11	59	RIAA: 8× Platinum; ARIA: 2× Platinum; BPI: Silver; MC: Diamond; RMNZ: 2× Platinum	Religiously. The Album.
"Religiously"	2023	13	4	1	—	18	1	34	71	RIAA: 4× Platinum; ARIA: Gold; BPI: Silver; MC: 5× Platinum; RMNZ: Platinum	Religiously. The Album.
"Won't Back Down" (with Dermot Kennedy featuring YoungBoy Never Broke Again)	2023	—	—	—	—	—	—	—	—		Fast X
"Where It Ends"	2023	32	6	1	—	21	1	22	68	RIAA: 3× Platinum; ARIA: Platinum; MC: 4× Platinum; RMNZ: Gold	Religiously. The Album. (Note: "Where It Ends" first appeared on the 2022 EP Leave the Light On before officially appearing on an album.)
"Holy Smokes"	2024	54	13	10	—	46	46	19	—	RIAA: Platinum; MC: 2× Platinum	Different Night Same Rodeo
"Backup Plan" (featuring Luke Combs)	2025	30	6	2	—	29	1	3	139	RIAA: Platinum; ARIA: Gold; MC: Platinum; RMNZ: Gold	Different Night Same Rodeo
"Ashes" (with Diplo)	2025	—	—	—	—	—	—	31	—		Different Night Same Rodeo
"Lost" (featuring the Kid Laroi)	2025	86	24	—	—	60	—	13	—		Different Night Same Rodeo
"Chevy Silverado"	2025	41	11	2	—	75	37	30	—		Different Night Same Rodeo
"Just Believe" (with Brandon Lake)	2026	— (Note: "Just Believe" did not enter the Billboard Hot 100, but peaked at number 5 on the Digital Song Sales chart.)	50	—	—	—	—	29	—		Non-album single

=== As featured artist ===
Singles as featured artist, with selected chart positions shown
Title	Year	Peak chart positions					Certifications	Album
Title	Year	US	US Country	CAN	NZ Hot	WW	Certifications	Album
"Strong Enough" (Jonas Brothers featuring Bailey Zimmerman)	2023	— (Note: "Strong Enough" did not enter the Billboard Hot 100, but peaked at number sixteen on the Bubbling Under Hot 100 Singles chart.)	—	—	19	—		Non-album single
"Someone in This Room" (Jessie Murph featuring Bailey Zimmerman)	2024	— (Note: "Someone in This Room" did not enter the Billboard Hot 100, but peaked at number eleven on the Bubbling Under Hot 100 Singles chart.)	—	—	23	—		That Ain't No Man That's the Devil
"All the Way" (BigXthaPlug featuring Bailey Zimmerman)	2025	4	1	21	—	23	RIAA: 2× Platinum; RMNZ: Gold	I Hope You're Happy

=== Promotional singles ===
Title	Year	Peak chart positions				Certifications	Album
Title	Year	US	US Country	CAN	NZ Hot	Certifications	Album
"Never Comin' Home"	2021	—	—	—	—	RIAA: Platinum; MC: Platinum	Non-album singles
"Small Town Crazy"	2021	—	—	—			Non-album singles
"Change"	2021	—	—	—	—	RIAA: Gold; MC: Gold	Non-album singles
"Never Leave"	2022	— (Note: "Never Leave" did not enter the Billboard Hot 100, but peaked at number one on the Bubbling Under Hot 100 Singles chart.)	27	—	—	RIAA: Gold; MC: Gold	Leave the Light On
"Get to Gettin' Gone"	2022	—	34	—	28	RIAA: Gold; MC: Gold	Religiously. The Album.
"Fix'n to Break"	2023	84	23	83	—	RIAA: Gold; MC: Gold	Religiously. The Album.
"Hell or High Water"	2024	— (Note: "Hell or High Water" did not enter the Billboard Hot 100, but peaked at number 23 on the Bubbling Under Hot 100 chart.)	38	—	—	MC: Gold	Twisters: The Album and Different Night Same Rodeo
"New to Country"	2024	94	27	98	—	RIAA: Gold	Different Night Same Rodeo
"Holding On"	2024	— (Note: "Holding On" did not enter the Billboard Hot 100, but peaked at number 20 on the Bubbling Under Hot 100 chart.)	37	93	34		Different Night Same Rodeo
"Comin' in Cold"	2025	— (Note: "Comin' in Cold" did not enter the Billboard Hot 100, but peaked at number 21 on the Bubbling Under Hot 100 chart.)	—	99	—		Different Night Same Rodeo

== Other charted and certified songs ==
List of other charted songs, with selected chart positions, certifications, and album name shown
Title	Year	Peak chart positions			Certifications	Album
Title	Year	US Bubbling	US Country	NZ Hot	Certifications	Album
"Waiting"	2022	21	36	—	MC: Gold	Leave the Light On
"House On Fire"	2022	—	—	—	RIAA: Gold; MC: Gold	Leave the Light On
"Chase Her"	2023	—	—	—	RIAA: Gold; MC: Gold	Religiously. The Album.
"You Don't Want That Smoke"	2023	5	28	30	RIAA: Gold; MC: Gold	Religiously. The Album.
