= Different Night Same Rodeo Tour =

2026 concert tour by Bailey Zimmerman

- Tour by Bailey Zimmerman
- Promotional poster
- Location: North America, Europe
- Associated album: Different Night Same Rodeo
- Start date: February 19, 2026
- End date: September 4, 2026
- Legs: 2
- No. of shows: 42

Bailey Zimmerman concert chronology
- New to Country Summer Tour (2025); Different Night Same Rodeo Tour (2026)

The Different Night Same Rodeo Tour is the fourth headlining concert tour by American country music artist Bailey Zimmerman. The tour is in support of his second studio album of the same name (2025). It began on February 19, 2026, in Estero, Florida and was set to conclude on September 4, in London before the European leg was cancelled.

== Background and promotion ==
The tour was announced on September 8, 2025, and as his first headlining arena tour with tickets going for sale on September 12. Hudson Westbrook and Blake Whiten were also announced as the openers for the North American leg. During the pre-show VIP Soundcheck party, he performed covers and original songs not on the set list. On March 3, 2026, Zimmerman announced a European leg of the tour with Chandler Walters as the opener. This leg would be cancelled due to "important family matters".

== Critical reception ==
The tour received generally positive reviews from music critics and fans. Critics have primarily highlighted Zimmerman's high-energy stage presence, improved vocal delivery, and the tour's elaborate production value. Reviewers from Country Now noted that Zimmerman has grown significantly as an entertainer, displaying "unstoppable energy" and a "command" of sold-out arenas. His stage presence was described by some as "pure electricity", with a relentless pace that keeps the crowd engaged for the duration of the set. Reviews from Music Scene Media categorized the show as "concert perfection", noting a loud, passionate crowd dominated by younger generations.

== Set list ==
This set list represents the February 19, 2026, show in Florida, it does not represent the full-length of the tour.

1. "Backup Plan"
2. "Never Comin' Home"
3. "Lost"
4. "Change"
5. "Fall in Love"
6. "Get to Gettin' Gone"
7. "Comin' in Cold"
8. "Fix'n to Break"
9. "Chevy Silverado"
10. "Before You"
11. "Yours for the Breaking"
12. "Holy Smokes"
13. "Chase Her"
14. "Ashes"
15. "Hell or High Water" (b-stage)
16. "Holding On" (with Blake Whiten) (b-stage)
17. "The Climb" (b-stage)
18. "All the Way"
19. "New to Country" (with Hudson Westbrook)
20. "Religiously"
21. "Where It Ends"
22. "Rock and a Hard Place"

Notes

- "Just Believe" would replace "Chase Her" on the set list following his Grand Rapids stop.
- "Never Leave" would replace "Yours for the Breaking" on the set list following his Fort Worth stop.

== Tour dates ==
List of concerts showing date, city, country, venue, attendance and gross revenue
Date	City	Country	Venue	Opening acts
North America
February 19, 2026	Estero	United States	Hertz Arena	Hudson Westbrook; Blake Whiten
February 21, 2026	Athens	United States	Akins Ford Arena	Hudson Westbrook; Blake Whiten
February 26, 2026	Greenville	United States	Bon Secours Wellness Arena	Hudson Westbrook; Blake Whiten
February 27, 2026	Knoxville	United States	Thompson–Boling Arena	Hudson Westbrook; Blake Whiten
February 28, 2026	Pikeville	United States	Appalachian Wireless Arena	Hudson Westbrook; Blake Whiten
March 5, 2026	Boston	United States	TD Garden	Hudson Westbrook; Blake Whiten
March 7, 2026	Statesboro	United States	Herring Pavilion	Hudson Westbrook; Blake Whiten
March 12, 2026	Grand Rapids	United States	Van Andel Arena	Hudson Westbrook; Blake Whiten
March 13, 2026	Moline	United States	Vibrant Arena	Hudson Westbrook; Blake Whiten
March 14, 2026	Evansville	United States	Ford Center	Hudson Westbrook; Blake Whiten
March 27, 2026	Orange Beach	United States	The Wharf Amphitheater	Hudson Westbrook; Blake Whiten
April 2, 2026	Fort Worth	United States	Dickies Arena	Hudson Westbrook; Blake Whiten
April 3, 2026	Baton Rouge	United States	Raising Cane's River Center	Hudson Westbrook; Blake Whiten
April 4, 2026	Corpus Christi	United States	Hilliard Center Arena	Hudson Westbrook; Blake Whiten
April 9, 2026	Uncasville	United States	Mohegan Sun Arena	Hudson Westbrook; Blake Whiten
April 10, 2026	Atlantic City	United States	Hard Rock Live at Etess Arena	Hudson Westbrook; Blake Whiten
April 11, 2026	Pittsburgh	United States	Petersen Events Center	Hudson Westbrook; Blake Whiten
April 16, 2026	Toledo	United States	Huntington Center	Hudson Westbrook; Blake Whiten
April 17, 2026	Green Bay	United States	Resch Center	Hudson Westbrook; Blake Whiten
April 18, 2026	Sioux Falls	United States	Denny Sanford Premier Center	Hudson Westbrook; Blake Whiten
April 30, 2026	Huntsville	United States	Von Braun Center	Hudson Westbrook; Blake Whiten
May 1, 2026	Nashville	United States	Ascend Amphitheater	Hudson Westbrook; Blake Whiten
May 2, 2026	Nashville	United States	Ascend Amphitheater	Hudson Westbrook; Blake Whiten
June 4, 2026	Airway Heights	United States	Northern Quest Resort & Casino	Hudson Westbrook; Blake Whiten
June 5, 2026	Nampa	United States	Ford Idaho Center	Hudson Westbrook; Blake Whiten
June 6, 2026	Bend	United States	Hayden Homes Amphitheater	Hudson Westbrook; Blake Whiten
June 10, 2026	Abbotsford	Canada	Abbotsford Centre	Hudson Westbrook; Blake Whiten
June 11, 2026	Kelowna	Canada	Prospera Place	Hudson Westbrook; Blake Whiten
June 13, 2026	Edmonton	Canada	Rogers Place	Hudson Westbrook; Blake Whiten
June 18, 2026	Toronto	Canada	RBC Amphitheatre	Hudson Westbrook; Blake Whiten
June 19, 2026	London	Canada	Canada Life Place	Hudson Westbrook; Blake Whiten
June 20, 2026	Kanata	Canada	Canadian Tire Centre	Hudson Westbrook; Blake Whiten

=== Cancelled concerts ===
Date	City	Country	Venue	Reason
August 27, 2026	Glasgow	Scotland	O2 Academy Glasgow	Important family matters
August 29, 2026	Lutterworth	England	Stanford Hall	Important family matters
August 31, 2026	Dublin	Ireland	Olympia Theatre	Important family matters
September 1, 2026	Belfast	Northern Ireland	Waterfront Hall	Important family matters
September 3, 2026	Manchester	England	Victoria Warehouse	Important family matters
September 4, 2026	London	England	Brixton Academy	Important family matters
September 6, 2026	Amsterdam	Netherlands	Melkweg	Important family matters
September 8, 2026	Hamburg	Germany	Docks	Important family matters
September 10, 2026	Stockholm	Sweden	Fallan	Important family matters
September 12, 2026	Oslo	Norway	Oslo Spektrum	Important family matters
