= Austin Shawn =

American songwriter and producer

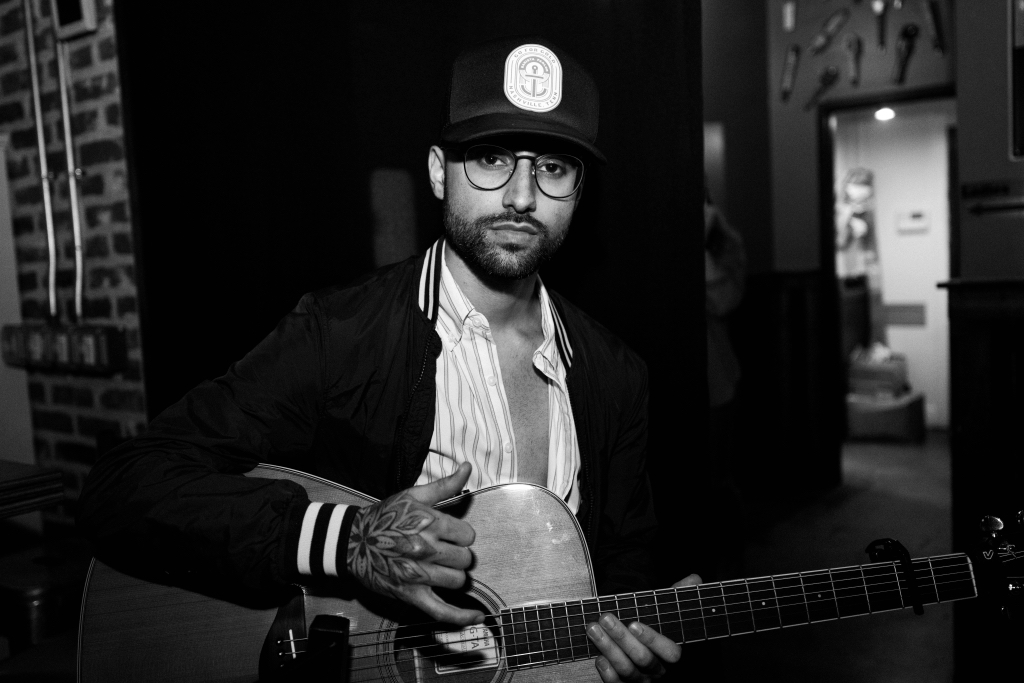

Background information
- Origin: Texas
- Genre: Country
- Occupations: Songwriter; producer; mixing; mastering engineer
- Years active: 2011–present
- Member of: The Core Entertainment; Warner Chappell
- Website: www.austinshawn.com

Austin Shawn is an American songwriter and producer as well as mixing and mastering engineer. Shawn is known for his work with country musician Bailey Zimmerman, including the singles "Fall in Love", "Rock and a Hard Place", and "Religiously", all of which peaked at No. 1 on the Billboard Country Airplay chart. His writing and production credits earned him 11 consecutive weeks on Billboard's Hot 100 Producer chart and in 2022, he joined The Core Entertainment's writer-producer management division.

== Early life and education ==
Shawn grew up in the Fort Worth, Texas area and began playing guitar at an early age. He began songwriting and also began producing and remixing music he had learned off YouTube. At the age of nineteen, he moved to Nashville, Tennessee to pursue a career in music.

== Career ==
While in Nashville, Shawn began songwriting and producing music for local independent music artists. He was then contacted to help produce music for upcoming country musician Bailey Zimmerman.

Shawn worked with Zimmerman on the 2022 single "Fall in Love." He wrote, mixed and produced the song which peaked at No.1 on the Billboard Country Airplay chart. he also produced Zimmerman's single "Rock and a Hard Place" and his debut album Religiously. The Album. which peaked at No.3 on Billboard's Top Country Albums chart. He had previously produced Leave the Light On, Zimmerman's debut EP in 2022.

Shawn also collaborated with country musician Chase Matthew on the certified platinum single "County Line" as well as producing more than half of Matthew's discography. In 2023, Shawn was No.1 on Billboard's Hot 100 Producer chart for 11 consecutive weeks. He also spent 48 consecutive weeks on Billboard's Country Producer chart. In 2023, he joined the writer-producer management division of The Core Entertainment.

== Discography ==
=== Singles ===
Year	Artist	Song	Role
2026	Bailey Zimmerman & Brandon Lake	"Just Believe"	Producer, co-writer
2026	Blake Whiten	"Break Me"	Producer
2026	Chase Matthew	"Here Without You"	Producer
2026	Chase Matthew	"Holdin’ It Down"	Producer, background vocals
2025	Bailey Zimmerman & The Kid Laroi	"Lost"	Producer, co-writer
2025	Bailey Zimmerman	"Chevy Silverado"	Producer, background vocals, programmer, mixer
2025	Bailey Zimmerman & Diplo	"Ashes"	Producer, co-writer, background vocals, programmer
2025	Bailey Zimmerman	"Comin' in Cold"	Producer
2025	ROTUNDO	"Drink Sometime"	Producer
2025	Bailey Zimmerman	"Backup Plan"	Producer, co-writer
2025	BigXthaPlug	"All The Way" (featuring Bailey Zimmerman)	Co-writer
2024	Bailey Zimmerman	"New to Country"	Produced, mixed, mastered
2024	Bailey Zimmerman	"Hell or High Water"	Co-writer, producer, mixed and mastered
2024	Bailey Zimmerman	"Holy Smokes"	Co-writer, producer, mixed and mastered
2024	LECADE	"Bed We Made"	Co-writer, producer
2023	Restless Road	"You Don't Have to Love Me"	Co-writer
2023	Jonas Brothers	"Strong Enough" (featuring Bailey Zimmerman)	vocal production, engineer
2023	YoungBoy Never Broke Again	"Won't Back Down" (featuring Dermot Kennedy and Baily Zimmerman)	vocal producer, engineer
2023	Colin Stough	"Til' the Day one Does"	Co-wrote, produced, mixed, mastered
2023	Chase Matthew	"The Way I Am"	produced, mixed, mastered
2023	Bailey Zimmerman	"Fix'n to Break"	Co-wrote, produced, mixed, mastered
2023	LECADE	"Next Town Over"	produced
2022	Bailey Zimmerman	"Get to Gettin' Gone"	produced, mixed, mastered
2022	Bailey Zimmerman	"Where It Ends"	produced, mixed, mastered
2022	Bailey Zimmerman	"Rock and a Hard Place"	produced, mixed, mastered
2022	Bailey Zimmerman	"Fall in Love"	Co-wrote, produced, mixed, mastered
2022	After Midtown	"Party in My Hometown"	produced, mixed, mastered
2022	After Midtown	"Down Like That"	produced, mixed, mastered
2022	Chase Matthew	"Love You Again"	Co-wrote, produced, mixed, mastered
2022	Chase Matthew	"Born For This"	Co-wrote, produced, mixed, mastered
2021	Bailey Zimmerman	"Change"	Co-wrote, produced, mixed, mastered
2021	Bailey Zimmerman	"Small Town Crazy"	produced, mixed, mastered
2021	Chase Matthew	"County Line"	produced, mixed, mastered
2021	Rachel Wiggins	"Never Really Over"	produced, mixed, mastered
2021	Rachel Wiggins	"Daddy's Girl"	produced, mixed, mastered
2020	Rachel Wiggins	"Used To It"	produced, mixed, mastered
2020	After Midtown	"Boys Like Us"	produced, mixed, mastered

=== Albums/EPs ===
Year	Artist	Album	Role
2025	Bailey Zimmerman	Different Night Same Rodeo	Producer, writer, mixer, and engineer
2025	Chase Matthew	Chase	Producer, co-writer, and mixer
2023	Chase Matthew	Come Get Your Memory	Co-wrote, produced, mixed, mastered
2023	Bailey Zimmerman	Religiously. The Album.	Co-wrote, produced, mixed, mastered
2023	Colin Stough	Promiseland EP	Co-wrote, produced, mixed, mastered
2022	Chase Matthew	Born for This	Co-wrote, produced, mixed, mastered
2022	Bailey Zimmerman	Leave the Light On	Co-wrote, produced, mixed, mastered
2021	After Midtown	Don't Give Away the Ending (EP)	produced, mixed, mastered
