= Never Leave (song) =

2022 song by Bailey Zimmerman

Promotional single by Bailey Zimmerman

from the EP Leave the Light On
- Released: September 15, 2022
- Genre: Country
- Length: 3:27
- Label: Warner Nashville; Elektra
- Songwriters: Bailey Zimmerman; Austin Shawn; Chris Sligh; Gavin Lucas; Mary Kutter
- Producer: Austin Shawn

Music video
- "Never Leave" on YouTube

"Never Leave" is a song by American country music singer Bailey Zimmerman, released on September 15, 2022, as a promotional single from his debut EP Leave the Light On (2022). It was produced by Austin Shawn.

== Background ==
Bailey Zimmerman explained the context behind the song in a press release:

I was in a pretty weird part of a relationship at the time, and just wanted to write something that expressed how I felt about the situation. When I came into the room with Gavin Lucas, Mary Kutter, and my man Chris Sligh, I knew I could be really honest!

Zimmerman wrote the song in 2021. He discovered the demo of the song in 2022 and teased it on social media. It attracted significant attention from fans, leading to Zimmerman finishing the song and releasing it.

== Content ==
The song features themes of love and heartbreak, like much of Bailey Zimmerman's music. In a slow tempo, it finds him pleading with his partner to not leave, so they can resolve the problems in their relationship. He sings in the chorus, "I won't give up on you, so darlin', don't give up on me / Don't you wanna stay? / Don't just walk away from our memories / And I can't promise nothin' but the rest of me / I'll fight for you, I'll fight for us, I'll fight to never leave".

== Charts ==
Chart performance for "Never Leave"
Chart (2022)	Peak position
US Bubbling Under Hot 100 (Billboard)	1
US Hot Country Songs (Billboard)	27

== Certifications ==
Region	Certification	Certified units/sales
Canada (Music Canada)	Gold	40,000^{‡}
United States (RIAA)	Gold	500,000^{‡}
^{‡} Sales+streaming figures based on certification alone.
