= Beathard =

Beathard is a surname. Notable people with the surname include:

- Bobby Beathard (1937–2023), American sports executive
- Casey Beathard (born 1965), American country music songwriter
- C. J. Beathard (born 1993), American football player
- Pete Beathard (born 1942), American football player
- Tucker Beathard (born 1995), American country music singer and songwriter
