= The Demos Vol. 1 =

EP by Tucker Beathard
- Released: October 16, 2015
- Recorded: 2015
- Genre: Country
- Length: 16:50
- Label: Big Machine Label Group

Tucker Beathard chronology
The Demos Vol. 1 (2015)	Fight Like Hell (2016)

The Demos Vol. 1 is the first release by American country music artist Tucker Beathard. The EP was released via Dot on October 16, 2015.

== Background and release ==
After graduating from Battleground Academy Beathard's plans were to play Division I baseball for Middle Tennessee State University. However, after tearing his shoulder Beathard decided to follow in the footsteps of his father Casey Beathard's footsteps and begin a career in country music.

After a busy summer of 2015 opening for national acts such as Eric Church, Dierks Bentley, Maddie & Tae and others, Beathard started writing and recording music for his debut project.

Beathard released the EP on October 16, 2015 as planned. It featured five demo songs, all of which would be finished, mastered and produced for his 2017 EP Fight Like Hell, with the exception of the track "Free", which was left off the next EP.

After Beathard signed with Dot Records who released his 2016 follow-up EP Fight Like Hell, Dot pulled The Demos Vol. 1 album from every digital platform and all other streaming services, making "Free" an unreleased track which has yet to be released on any other of Tucker's releases. "Free" was eventually put back on YouTube in August 2020.

== Track listing ==
No.	Title	Length
1.	"Rock On"	3:30
2.	"Momma and Jesus"	3:26
3.	"20-10 Tennessee"	3:24
4.	"Better Than Me"	3:17
5.	"Free"	3:11
