= Blake Whiten =

American country singer (born 2004)

- Whiten in 2026
- Born: July 29, 2004 (age 22)
- Occupations: Singer; songwriter
- Years active: 2024–present
- Musical career
- Genre: Country
- Instruments: Vocals; guitar
- Labels: Enchntmnt; Warner
- Website: www.blakewhitenofficial.com

Blake Whiten (born July 29, 2004) is an American country singer and songwriter. His debut album, Something to Say, was released in 2026, which included his first Billboard Hot 100 hit "Bet on That".

== Early life ==
Whiten grew up in Six Mile, South Carolina, the son of Windi and Matthew Whiten. His parents bought him his first guitar when he was four. His father, who was a preacher, taught him to play four chords. He was writing songs by age fifteen while a student at D. W. Daniel High School. He also began working in construction at age sixteen.

== Career ==
Whiten began posting original songs and covers on TikTok that he recorded in his bedroom. He first gained attention for his cover of Morgan Wallen's "I'm the Problem" in June 2024. Within days, he flew to Nashville to pursue a country music career. He independently released his debut single, "Breakin' My Heart", in September. Later that year, he registered his first hit by co-writing Bailey Zimmerman's "Holding On", reaching the top 40 on Billboard's Hot Country Songs chart.

Whiten independently released his debut extended play (EP), Six Mile, in April 2025. Soon later, he signed his first recording contract with Enchntmnt and Warner Records. The next year, between February and June 2026, he supported Bailey Zimmerman on his Different Night Same Rodeo Tour. During this period, he also opened a few shows for Morgan Wallen on his Still the Problem Tour.

Whiten's debut album, Something to Say, was released in July 2026. He celebrated his album release performing in his hometown Six Mile and drew a crowd greater than the town's population. The following month, he scored his first Billboard Hot 100 entry with his single "Bet on That".

== Discography ==
=== Studio albums ===
Title	Details	Peak chart positions
Title	Details	US
Something to Say	Released: July 3, 2026; Label: Enchntmnt/Warner	200

=== Extended plays ===
List of extended plays, with selected details
Title	EP details
Six Mile	Released: April 4, 2025; Label: Independent release

=== Singles ===
Title	Year	Peak chart positions				Certifications	Album
Title	Year	US	US Country	US Country Airplay	CAN	Certifications	Album
"Breakin' My Heart"	2024	—	—	—	—		Six Mile
"Rollin' Stone"	2024	—	—	—	—	RIAA: Gold; MC: Gold	Six Mile
"He's Gone"	2024	—	—	—	—		Six Mile
"Bad Guy"	2025	—	—	—	—		Six Mile
"Carolina"	2025	—	—	—	—		Something to Say
"Made for Goodbyes"	2025	—	—	—	—		Something to Say
"Hard to Break"	2025	—	—	—	—		Something to Say
"Night n' Day"	2025	—	—	—	—		Something to Say
"Break Me"	2026	—	—	—	—		Something to Say
"Ghost House"	2026	—	—	—	—		Something to Say
"Bet on That"	2026	81	25	22	71	MC: Gold	Something to Say
"Barely Gettin' By"	2026	—	—	—	—		Something to Say

== Tours ==
=== Headlining ===
- Something to Say Tour (2026)

=== Opening ===
- Different Night Same Rodeo Tour (2026, with Bailey Zimmerman)
- Still the Problem Tour (2026, with Morgan Wallen)
