= Rock On (Tucker Beathard song) =

Single by Tucker Beathard

from the EP Fight Like Hell
- Released: March 7, 2016
- Genre: Country rock
- Length: 3:34
- Label: Dot
- Songwriters: Tucker Beathard; Casey Beathard; Marla Cannon-Goodman
- Producer: Angelo Petraglia

Tucker Beathard singles chronology
| "Rock On" (2016) | "Momma and Jesus" (2016) |

"Rock On" is the debut single by American country music artist Tucker Beathard. It was released in March 2016 as the first single from Beathard's debut EP Fight Like Hell. Beathard wrote the song with his father, Casey Beathard, and Marla Cannon-Goodman. It was included on his extended play, Fight Like Hell, released on October 7.

== Critical reception ==
An uncredited Taste of Country review of the song was positive, saying that "Every note and guitar lick of this scorned country rocker feels genuine and sincere. There’s little doubt he has a face in mind as he sings about the girl that got away, and then changes to the point that he doesn’t want her back anymore anyway."

== Commercial performance ==
The song has sold 216,000 copies in the United States as of October 2016.

== Music video ==
The music video was directed by Good One, a collaboration between brothers Ry and Drew Cox, and premiered in May 2016.

== Chart performance ==
=== Weekly charts ===
| Chart (2016) | Peak position |
|---|---|
| Canada Country (Billboard) | 46 |
| US Billboard Hot 100 | 62 |
| US Country Airplay (Billboard) | 2 |
| US Hot Country Songs (Billboard) | 9 |

=== Year end charts ===
| Chart (2016) | Position |
|---|---|
| US Country Airplay (Billboard) | 18 |
| US Hot Country Songs (Billboard) | 42 |

== See also ==
- Nobody's Everything (2018)
