= Fight Like Hell =

EP by Tucker Beathard
- Released: October 7, 2016
- Recorded: 2016
- Genre: Country
- Label: Dot
- Producer: Angelo Petraglia

Tucker Beathard chronology
The Demos Vol. 1 (2015)	Fight Like Hell (2016)	Nobody's Everything (2018)

Fight Like Hell is the debut EP by American country-rock artist Tucker Beathard. The EP was released October 7, 2016 via Dot Records.

The EP spawned the top-five country hit "Rock On", peaking at No. 2 on country radio on October 22, 2016.

== Background and release ==
After signing with Dot Records and releasing his first EP, The Demos Vol. 1, in late 2015, Beathard gained a following at dive-bars across the east coast of the United States.

In November 2015, Beathard posted three more demos on his YouTube Channel: "Ride On", "God and My Guitar", and the fan favorite, "Faithful". These demos gained Beathard national attention and led to him opening for Maddie and Tae and Dierks Bentley's on their 2016 tours.

After wrapping up touring with Dierks Bentley on his Somewhere on a Beach Tour in the fall of 2016, on September 7, 2016, Beathard officially announced he would be releasing his debut EP, Fight Like Hell, one month later on October 7, 2016.

The EP spawned two singles, including Beathard's highest-charting single to date, "Rock On", which peaked at No. 2 on Country Airplay on October 22, 2016.

The second single, "Momma and Jesus", reached No. 43 on Country Airplay on April 1, 2017.

Fight Like Hell debuted at No. 14 on the country albums chart and sold 3,900 copies in its first week of release.

== Track listing ==
No.	Title	Length
1.	"I'll Take On The World With You"	3:26
2.	"Rock On"	3:33
3.	"20-10 Tennessee"	3:30
4.	"Home Sweet USA"	3:27
5.	"Momma and Jesus"	3:26
6.	"Fight Like Hell"	3:09

== Personnel ==
Adapted from liner notes.

- Casey Beathard - background vocals (tracks 2–4)
- Tucker Beathard - acoustic guitar (all tracks), drums (all tracks except 3 & 5), electric guitar (all tracks), electric sitar (track 4), lead vocals (all tracks), background vocals (track 4)
- Dave Cohen - keyboards (all tracks except 1 & 6)
- Dan Dugmore - steel guitar (track 4)
- Shannon Forrest - drums (tracks 3, 5)
- Lee Hendricks - bass guitar (tracks 1, 6)
- Evan Hutchings - programming (tracks 2, 4)
- Tony Lucido - bass guitar (track 4)
- Justin Ostrander - electric guitar (tracks 1, 6)
- Angelo Petraglia - electric guitar (all tracks), piano (track 6), Solina (track 1), background vocals (track 4)
- Adam Shoenfeld - electric guitar (all tracks except 1 & 6)
- Jonathan Singleton - dobro (track 5), programming (track 5), background vocals (tracks 1, 5, 6)
- Jimmie Lee Sloas - bass guitar (tracks 2, 3, 5)
- Derek Wells - electric guitar (tracks 3, 5)
