= Leave the Light On (EP) =

EP by Bailey Zimmerman
- Released: October 14, 2022
- Recorded: 2021–2022
- Genre: Country; country rock
- Length: 28:37
- Label: Warner Nashville; Elektra
- Producer: Austin Shawn

Bailey Zimmerman chronology
Leave the Light On (2022)	Religiously. The Album. (2023)

Singles from Leave the Light On
- 1. "Fall in Love" Released: February 11, 2022; 2. "Rock and a Hard Place" Released: June 10, 2022; 3. "Where It Ends" Released: October 2, 2023

Leave the Light On is the debut EP by American country music singer Bailey Zimmerman. It was released on October 14, 2022, by Warner Music Nashville and Elektra Records. Despite receiving mixed critical reviews upon release, it debuted in the top ten of the Billboard 200. His number one hits on the country music airplay charts include: "Fall in Love" and "Rock and a Hard Place".

== Content ==
The EP was preceded by the singles "Fall in Love" and "Rock and a Hard Place", the former of which charted in the top 10 on Country Airplay. It was also preceded by the songs "Where It Ends" and "Never Leave". Zimmerman co-wrote all but two of the EP's tracks.

== Critical reception ==
Stephen Thomas Erlewine of AllMusic praised the song "From the Fall" as offering "slight echoes of sighing '70s soft rock, offering an appealing bit of sweetening", but was critical of the EP overall, such as the song "Where it Ends" in which Zimmerman's vocals and guitar play were compared to that of "a Southern-fried Chad Kroeger".

Lesley Janes of The Nash News offered a more positive review, stating in part, "The way he sings about true heartbreak feels authentic and new at the same time".

== Commercial performance ==
Leave the Light On debuted at number nine on the Billboard 200, as well as number two on Top Country Albums, earning 32,000 album equivalent units in its first week. It also debuted at number eight on Canadian Albums.

== Track listing ==
No.	Title	Writer(s)	Length
1.	"Intro"	Bailey Zimmerman	0:13
2.	"Never Leave"	Zimmerman; Austin Shawn; Chris Sligh; Gavin Lucas; Mary Kutter	3:27
3.	"Waiting"	Zimmerman; Shawn; Lucas	3:37
4.	"House on Fire"	Zimmerman; Shawn; Lucas; Heath Warren	3:40
5.	"From the Fall"	Shawn; Dylan Wolfe; Lucas	3:48
6.	"Trainwreck"	Zimmerman; Shawn; Lucas; Morgan Wallen; Sergio Sanchez	3:30
7.	"Fall in Love"	Zimmerman; Shawn; Lucas	3:52
8.	"Rock and a Hard Place"	Warren; Jacob Hackworth; Jet Harvey	3:27
9.	"Where It Ends"	Zimmerman; Joe London; Grant Averill; Joe Spargur	2:59

== Personnel ==
Credits adapted from Tidal.

- Bailey Zimmerman – vocals (tracks 2–9)
- Austin Shawn – production, engineering (all tracks); background vocals, bass guitar (2–7, 9); piano (2–7); mixing, mastering (3–7, 9); programming (7, 8)
- Tim Galloway – acoustic guitar, drums (2–9); electric guitar (2–4, 6, 8), banjo (5, 9)
- Kurt Ozan – pedal steel guitar (2, 5, 6, 8), electric guitar (5, 7, 9), bass guitar (7), slide guitar (7)
- Jeff Balding – mixing (2, 8)
- Andrew Mendelson – mastering (2, 8)
- Tristan Ableson – mixing assistance (2)
- Scotty Sanders – pedal steel guitar (3)
- Jim Van Cleve – fiddle (3, 8)
- Brett Sandler – organ (5, 6)
- Michael Rinne – bass guitar (8)
- Josh Kearney – electric guitar (9)

== Charts ==
=== Weekly charts ===
Weekly chart performance for Leave the Light On
Chart (2022)	Peak position
Australian Albums (ARIA)	95
Canadian Albums (Billboard)	8
US Billboard 200	9
US Top Country Albums (Billboard)	2

=== Year-end charts ===
Year-end chart performance for Leave the Light On for 2022
Chart (2022)	Position
US Top Country Albums (Billboard)	68

Year-end chart performance for Leave the Light On for 2023
Chart (2023)	Position
US Billboard 200	94
US Top Country Albums (Billboard)	20

Year-end chart performance for Leave the Light On for 2024
Chart (2024)	Position
Australian Country Albums (ARIA)	29

== Certifications ==
Certifications for Leave the Light On
Region	Certification	Certified units/sales
Canada (Music Canada)	2× Platinum	160,000^{‡}
^{‡} Sales+streaming figures based on certification alone.
