= Chevy Silverado (song) =

2025 single by Bailey Zimmerman

Single by Bailey Zimmerman

from the album Different Night Same Rodeo
- Released: October 13, 2025
- Genre: Country
- Length: 3:41
- Label: Atlantic; Warner Nashville
- Songwriters: Bailey Zimmerman; Tucker Beathard; Ilsey Juber; Gavin Lucas; Heath Warren
- Producer: Austin Shawn

Bailey Zimmerman singles chronology
"Lost" (2025)	"Chevy Silverado" (2025)	"Just Believe" (2026)

Music video
- "Chevy Silverado" on YouTube

"Chevy Silverado" is a song by American country music singer Bailey Zimmerman. It was first released on August 1, 2025 as a promotional single, before being sent to country radio on October 13, 2025 as the third single from Zimmerman's second studio album, Different Night Same Rodeo (2025). It was written by Zimmerman, Gavin Lucas, Heath Warren, Ilsey Juber, and Tucker Beathard, and produced by Austin Shawn.

It peaked at No. 1 on the Mediabase Country chart and No. 41 on the Billboard Hot 100.

== Background and composition ==
"Chevy Silverado" was released on August 1, 2025, through Atlantic Records and Warner Music Nashville. The song appears as the third track on Zimmerman's second studio album, Different Night Same Rodeo, which was released on August 8, 2025. It followed the album's promotional singles "Comin' in Cold" and "Ashes", the latter featuring Diplo. "Chevy Silverado" was subsequently selected as the album's third radio single on October 13, 2025.

The song is directly inspired by the first truck he ever owned: a 2005 white Chevy Silverado that he bought from his grandpa when he was 16 years old for $9,800. Lyrically, the song is a country heartbreak ballad framed as an ode to the narrator's truck. Its lyrics describe a failed relationship and the narrator's attachment to a white Chevrolet Silverado, which remains as a reminder of his former partner. Although he no longer has "the girl" beside him, the truck represents both the relationship he lost and his lingering hope of returning to her. The song contrasts imagery associated with driving and pickup trucks with questions about how the couple's young love grew distant.

== Commercial performance ==
Upon its promotional release, "Chevy Silverado" debuted at No. 44 and No. 25 on the Hot Country Songs and Bubbling Under Hot 100 charts respectively on August 16, 2025. It would debut at No. 56 on Country Airplay following its impact date on October 25, 2025. After 37 weeks, it reached the Top 10, becoming his seventh entry on Country Airplay. On July 4, 2026, it debuted at No. 89 on the Billboard Hot 100. On the Mediabase Country chart, it became his sixth career number-one.

== Music video ==
The music video for "Chevy Silverado" premiered on August 24, 2026, directed by Isaac Mason. The video featured Zimmerman driving around his hometown Louisville, Illinois with his friends listening to the song.

== Charts ==
Chart performance for "Chevy Silverado"
Chart (2025–2026)	Peak position
Australia Country Hot 50 (The Music)	18
Canada Hot 100 (Billboard)	75
Canada Country (Billboard)	37
New Zealand Hot Singles (RMNZ)	30
UK Country Airplay (Radiomonitor)	16
US Billboard Hot 100	41
US Country Airplay (Billboard)	2
US Hot Country Songs (Billboard)	11

== Release history ==
Release dates and formats for "Chevy Silverado"
Region	Date	Format(s)	Label(s)	Ref.
United States	October 13, 2025	Country radio	Warner Music Nashville	
