= Religiously. The Album. =

Studio album by Bailey Zimmerman
- Released: May 12, 2023
- Recorded: 2021–2023
- Genre: Country
- Length: 52:43
- Label: Warner Nashville; Elektra
- Producer: Austin Shawn; Joel Bruyere

Bailey Zimmerman chronology
Leave the Light On (2022)	Religiously. The Album. (2023)	Different Night Same Rodeo (2025)

Singles from Religiously. The Album.
- 1. "Fall in Love" Released: February 11, 2022; 2. "Rock and a Hard Place" Released: June 10, 2022; 3. "Religiously" Released: April 17, 2023; 4. "Where It Ends" Released: October 2, 2023

Religiously. The Album. is the debut studio album by American country music singer Bailey Zimmerman. It was released on May 12, 2023, by Warner Music Nashville and Elektra Records. It includes the number one singles "Fall in Love", "Rock and a Hard Place", "Religiously", and "Where It Ends" (three of which were also featured on his debut EP Leave the Light On). Other tracks released as promotional singles include "Get to Gettin' Gone" and "Fix'n to Break". Zimmerman co-wrote eleven of the album's sixteen tracks.

== Background ==
The album was announced on March 18, 2023. Alongside the title track, Zimmerman released a statement accompanying the announcement, where he explained, "The past two years of my life have been insane and the fact that I get to release my first ever album is so surreal. Thank you to everyone that has had my back through thick and thin. I will never be able to repay y'all for the love and support, this album is for you."

== Track listing ==
Religiously. The Album. track listing
No.	Title	Writer(s)	Length
1.	"Religiously"	Austin Shawn; Alex Palmer; Bailey Zimmerman; Frank Romano; Marty James	2:58
2.	"Warzone"	Shawn; Zimmerman; Gavin Lucas; Michael Hobby	3:24
3.	"Fix'n to Break"	Shawn; Zimmerman; Chandler Walters; Lucas; Sergio Sanchez	3:52
4.	"Forget About You"	Zimmerman; Drew Baldridge; Lucas; Nick Schwarz	2:55
5.	"Chase Her"	Andrew Stoelzing; Heath Warren; Jared Scott; Matthew Schuster; Nate Miles	3:18
6.	"Fall in Love"	Shawn; Zimmerman; Lucas	3:52
7.	"You Don't Want That Smoke"	Jimi Bell; Tucker Beathard	3:20
8.	"Found Your Love"	Shawn; Zimmerman; Lucas	3:33
9.	"Rock and a Hard Place"	Warren; Jacob Hackworth; Jet Harvey	3:27
10.	"Other Side of Lettin' Go"	Zimmerman; Walters; Lucas; Warren	3:27
11.	"Pain Won't Last"	Avery Roberson; Brandon Wish; Ryan Spencer	4:00
12.	"Where It Ends"	Zimmerman; Grant Averill; Joe Spargur	2:59
13.	"God's Gonna Cut You Down"	Traditional	2:48
14.	"Fadeaway"	Shawn; Zimmerman; Lucas; Warren	2:40
15.	"Get to Gettin' Gone"	Zimmerman; Greylan James; Jason Massey	3:02
16.	"Is This Really Over?"	Zimmerman; Walters; Cody Lohden; Ernest Keith Smith; Mark Holman; Rhys Rutherford	3:08
Total length:			52:43

== Personnel ==
Musicians

- Bailey Zimmerman – vocals
- Tim Galloway – acoustic guitar (all tracks), banjo (tracks 1–4, 6, 8, 12, 13, 15, 16), bouzouki (1, 2, 10, 11, 14, 15), electric guitar (1–5, 9–11, 13, 15, 16), mandolin (3, 10, 14, 15), slide guitar (3), Dobro (13), bass guitar (16)
- Austin Shawn – background vocals (1–5, 7, 8, 10–16), bass guitar (1–4, 7, 8, 12, 15), drums (1–7, 9, 12–16), programming (1, 3–11, 13, 15, 16)
- Michael Rinne – bass guitar (1, 4, 5, 9–11, 13, 14)
- Joel Bruyere – Dobro (1)
- Jenee Fleenor – fiddle (1, 2, 7, 8, 10)
- Dave Cohen – keyboards (1, 5, 7, 13, 14, 16), organ (1, 2, 4, 5, 7, 8, 11, 13, 14, 16), piano (2)
- Kurt Ozan – pedal steel guitar (2, 3, 5, 9, 10); electric guitar (3, 6, 12), Dobro (3); bass guitar, slide guitar (6)
- Justin Schipper – pedal steel guitar (5, 7, 11)
- Brett Sandler – organ (6, 10, 15)
- Rachel Wiggins – background vocals (8)
- Jerry Roe – drums (8, 10, 11)
- Adam Ernst – electric guitar (8)
- Scotty Sanders – pedal steel guitar (8, 15)
- Jim Van Cleve – fiddle (9)
- Josh Kearney – electric guitar (12)

Technical

- Austin Shawn – production, mastering, mixing, engineering
- Joel Bruyere – production (1)
- Jim Cooley – mixing (2, 10, 11, 16)
- Andrew Cruz – editing (10, 13)
- Chris Baseford – editing (10, 13)

== Charts ==
=== Weekly charts ===
Weekly chart performance for Religiously. The Album.
Chart (2023)	Peak position
Australian Albums (ARIA)	25
Australian Country Albums (ARIA)	3
Canadian Albums (Billboard)	8
UK Americana Albums (OCC)	3
UK Country Albums (OCC)	9
US Billboard 200	7
US Top Country Albums (Billboard)	3

=== Year-end charts ===
2023 year-end chart performance for Religiously. The Album.
Chart (2023)	Position
US Billboard 200	68
US Top Country Albums (Billboard)	15

2024 year-end chart performance for Religiously. The Album.
Chart (2024)	Position
Australian Country Albums (ARIA)	14
Canadian Albums (Billboard)	30
US Billboard 200	45
US Top Country Albums (Billboard)	10

2025 year-end chart performance for Religiously. The Album.
Chart (2025)	Position
US Billboard 200	106
US Top Country Albums (Billboard)	21

== Certifications ==
Certifications for Religiously. The Album.
Region	Certification	Certified units/sales
Australia (ARIA)	Gold	35,000^{‡}
Canada (Music Canada)	3× Platinum	240,000^{‡}
New Zealand (RMNZ)	Gold	7,500^{‡}
United States (RIAA)	2× Platinum	2,000,000^{‡}
^{‡} Sales+streaming figures based on certification alone.
