= King (Tucker Beathard album) =

Studio album by Tucker Beathard
- Released: August 21, 2020
- Recorded: 2018–2020
- Studio: Dark Horse Recording Studio
- Genre: Country
- Length: 47:00
- Label: Warner Nashville
- Producers: Tucker Beathard; Jordan Rigby; Scott Johnson

Tucker Beathard chronology
Nobody's Everything (2018)	King (2020)

Singles from King
- 1. "Better Than Me" Released: February 22, 2019; 2. "Find Me Here" Released: May 31, 2019; 3. "You Would Think" Released: February 21, 2020; 4. "Can't Stay Here" Released: May 29, 2020; 5. "Faithful" Released: July 17, 2020

King (stylized in all caps as KING) is the second full-length studio album by American country music artist Tucker Beathard. The album was released on August 21, 2020 and serves as the second part of his 2018 debut album Nobody's Everything; it also serves as his first album released under his new record label Warner Music Group Nashville.

== Background and release ==
When Beathard announced the release of his 2018 debut album Nobody's Everything on November 26, 2018, Beathard stated in an interview with Rolling Stone that the album will serve as the first of a two-part debut record, the first installment was released November 30, with part two set to be released sometime in 2019.

On January 15, 2019, Beathard announced he had signed a new record deal with Warner Music Group Nashville's division and would be releasing the second installment of his double feature debut album with the label which was expected to be released later that year.

On February 20, Beathard announced he would be releasing the first track from the second installment of his double debut album titled "Better Than Me" on February 22, the same day his "Ride On" headlining tour kicked off at Cayote Joes in Charlotte, North Carolina in support of his debut effort. "Better Than Me" was officially sent to radio stations as a single on April 8, 2019.

Beathard toured extensively throughout the United States in 2019 in support of part 1 of his debut album headlining his spring and supper 2019 "Ride On tour" and playing select shows with Hank Williams, Jr.

On May 29, Beathard announced he would be releasing the second track titled "Find Me Here" from the second installment of his debut album. The track along with the accompanying music video was released May 31, 2019.

Beathard announced on September 9, he would be headlining the Monster Energy Outbreak Tour in support of part one of his debut studio effort and to promote new songs that will be featured on part two of the album. The tour kicked off October 31, 2019 in Columbia, South Carolina. At the show in Charlotte, Tucker announced the second installment of the album will likely be released in mid-2020 due to putting finishing touches on the album after his current tour was over in December. He also announced his label wanted to release his track titled "You Would Think" as the next single in support of the album.

Beathard's work on the second installment of his album was put to a halt on December 21, when the Beathard family announced Tucker's younger brother Clay Beathard had been stabbed in an altercation, where he stood up and was protecting a girl inside the bar that he had gone to school with that was being harassed and assaulted by two unknown men. In the early hours of the morning that day at the Dogwood Bar on Division Street in uptown Nashville, Clay died at the hospital a few hours late after doctors were unable to save him.

On January 9, 2020, Beathard took to his social media and posted a video of him playing a new song completely acoustically and saying "first new song of 2020" and titled it in the caption "can't stay here". The song was praised by fans and followers and was begged by fans alike to be included on his upcoming album.

Beathard announced via his social media on February 19, that "You Would Think" the next single from his upcoming album. It would be released as a single on February 21, 2021. He also announced he would be playing at the Ryman Auditorium the following day to support the single.

On February 22, Beathard played his first live concert at The Grand Ole Opry following the death of his younger breather Clay right before Christmas the previous year, Beathard has a tradition of debuting new music each time he plays at the Opry and he stuck to the tradition and debuted his new song titled "I Ain't Without You" that night. The track was written in tribute to his little brother Clay by Tucker together with his father Casey Beathard. Beathard eventually announced to his followers on social media "I Ain't Without You" was being recorded and added as the last song on his upcoming album.

Beathard released a new song on his social media sites titled "Thank a Soldier" on May 25, in honor of Memorial Day. The track was only posted on his social media sites and was not featured on the album.

On May 26, 2020, Beathard announced his next track to be released from his upcoming album would be "Can't Stay Here" the track he had posted earlier in the year that quickly become a fan favorite. The track along with the music video was released on May 29, 2020.

Beathard was scheduled to join Brooks & Dunn on their summer 2020 Reboot Tour across America however the tour was postponed and near all of Tucker's scheduled performances of the summer were cancelled due to the ongoing COVID-19 pandemic.

Due to the ongoing pandemic during the spring and summer of 2020, Tucker played numerous live shows from home via Facebook Live, Instagram Live and a few other platforms to support new music and keep fans up to date with details regarding the release of the upcoming second installment of his album. During these shows Tucker debuted new songs that did not make the final cut for the upcoming album a few tracks being "Same Page, Different Book", "Thought I Wouldn't Care", "Cheap Shots", "I Ain't Home", "Finer Things" and revisited a lot of old unreleased tracks that never got released before being "Tell It To The New Me", "Chasing You with Whiskey", "Time These Days", "She Goes", "Goodbye Amy", "Same Kinda Different", "Perfect Imperfections", "Caught Up in a Good Night" and "God and My Guitar".

On July 15, Tucker announced on his social media that his long time fan favorite track "Faithful" would be released for download two days later. He shared a link to pre-save the song on Spotify and when clicked it led to an album cover titled "KING" saying coming soon.

Beathard announced on July 17, that part two of his debut album would be titled "KING" and be released on August 21. This serves as Tucker's first full-length album for Warner Music Group and would complete the both installments of his debut album first announced in November 2018. Beathard stated his decided to name the album King in honor of his late brother, whose full name was Clayton King Beathard, who died just before Christmas the previous year. The album will feature 13 tracks with Tucker taking yet again the responsibility of composer, drums, acoustic guitar, electric guitar, percussions, producer and vocals himself.

As another way to promote Beathard's new releases on July 31, Beathard's label Warner Music Nashville released a remix of Tucker's newly released song "Faithful" with a collaboration for upcoming female country artist Lindsay Ell. This version of the track was left off of the album and only available to stream on YouTube.

Tucker's official statement for the albums release was "I decided to name this album in honor of my little brother Clay, with King being his middle name. From top to bottom this album is a product of the highs and lows, and everything in between that the past few years have been. Through it all I've realized that at the end of the day there’s only one true King, and his kingdom is not of this world."

Beathard released "I Ain't Without You" on August 7, as a token of appreciation to who pre-ordered the album and gave insight on how the track was the last added to the album before being finished.

King was released as planned on August 21, 2020.

== Track listing ==
No.	Title	Writer(s)	Length
1.	"Better Than Me"	Tucker Beathard; Dan Isbell; Jonathan Singleton	3:24
2.	"You Would Think"	Casey Beathard; T. Beathard; Donovan Woods	3:20
3.	"One Upper"	T. Beathard; Jeff Hyde; Ben Stennis	3:18
4.	"20/10 TN"	T. Beathard; C. Beathard; Phil O'Donnell	3:25
5.	"Paper Town"	T. Beathard; Monty Criswell; O'Donnell	4:06
6.	"You On"	T. Beathard; C. Beathard; Luke Dick	3:14
7.	"Miss You Now"	T. Beathard; Woods; Todd Clark	3:56
8.	"Only"	T. Beathard; Marla Cannon-Goodman	4:54
9.	"Find Me Here (Broke Down)"	T. Beathard; O'Donnell; Criswell	3:54
10.	"Too Drunk"	T. Beathard; Shane Minor; Joe Whelan	3:29
11.	"Faithful"	T. Beathard; Cannon-Goodman	3:29
12.	"Can't Stay Here"	T. Beathard; Will Lamb; Ryan Tyndell; Whelan	3:21
13.	"I Ain't Without You"	T. Beathard; C. Beathard	3:38
Total length:			47:00

== Personnel ==
Credits provided by AllMusic

- Tucker Beathard - acoustic guitar, drums, electric guitar, percussion, lead vocals
- Sarah Buxton - background vocals
- David Dorn - keyboards
- Ross Holmes - strings
- Jordan Rigby - bass guitar, electric guitar, keyboards, percussion, programming, background vocals
- Ryan Tyndell - acoustic guitar, electric guitar, keyboards, percussion, background vocals
