= Different Night Same Rodeo =

Studio album by Bailey Zimmerman
- Released: August 8, 2025
- Genres: Country; country pop; country rock
- Length: 57:35
- Labels: Warner Nashville; Elektra
- Producer: Austin Shawn

Bailey Zimmerman chronology
Religiously. The Album. (2023)	Different Night Same Rodeo (2025)

Singles from Different Night Same Rodeo
- 1. "Holy Smokes" Released: June 10, 2024; 2. "Backup Plan" Released: May 2, 2025; 3. "Ashes" Released: June 27, 2025; 4. "Lost" Released: August 8, 2025; 5. "Chevy Silverado" Released: October 13, 2025

Different Night Same Rodeo is the second studio album by American country artist Bailey Zimmerman. The album was released on August 8, 2025, via Warner Nashville and Elektra.

== Background ==
Although Zimmerman initially assembled a batch of songs for his sophomore record, he ultimately "pulled the plug" on the project, feeling it was not personal enough. He restarted the process, writing new songs and co-writing seven of the final eighteen tracks.

Zimmerman announced Different Night Same Rodeo on July 8, 2025, via social media and during a live performance at Spotify House during CMA Fest in Nashville. He explained that the title was taken from a lyric of the opening track "Comin' in Cold".

While debuting the track "Comin' in Cold", Zimmerman told the audience that he had spent the past two years working on the album and had postponed its release due to his mother's illness. "This album is something different... Everybody around me feels like it's the album I'm supposed to put out." In his announcement on social media, he thanked his fans for their patience, saying, "I hope the wait is worth it," and hinted at the album's emotional depth. The project was produced by Zimmerman's longtime collaborator Austin Shawn, who also produced his debut album, Religiously. The Album.

To promote the album, Zimmerman launched his New To Country Tour in mid-2025, with his first shows taking place in early June in Indianapolis and Sterling, Michigan. In addition to the tour, Zimmerman is set to perform at several major festivals throughout the year, including Hoofbeat, Country Jam, Country Thunder, Big Valley Jamboree, and Boots & Hearts. He announced his first-ever arena tour, the Different Night Same Rodeo Tour, in support of the album for 2026. "Chevy Silverado" would be chosen as the third single for the album on October 13, 2025.

== Critical reception ==
Professional ratings
Review scores
Source	Rating
Country Central	7.2/10
Entertainment Focus	4.5/5 stars

Different Night Same Rodeo received generally positive reviews from critics, who praised Zimmerman's vocal delivery, willingness to experiment across genres, and authentic approach to songwriting, while also noting some unevenness in cohesion.

Max Buondonno of Country Central gave the album a 7.2/10, calling Zimmerman "a genuine, down-to-earth heartthrob" with Post Malone-like vibrato but also one who occasionally lapses into "Florida Georgia Line-style bro-country." Buondonno noted that the record's "playlist mentality" created an uneven listening experience but argues that the variety was part of its charm.

Melinda Newman of Billboard highlighted the album's thematic focus on heartbreak and resilience, describing Zimmerman's vocals as carrying a "rugged, appealing vulnerability." Jessica Nicholson, also of Billboard, praised the mix of self-written tracks outside cuts from Nashville songwriters, noting that the final album reflected Zimmerman's growth and willingness to balance radio-ready hooks with raw, autobiographical detail.

James Daykin of Entertainment Focus awarded the album 4.5 stars out of five, praising its "confident and compelling step forward" compared to Zimmerman's debut.

== Track listing ==
No.	Title	Writer(s)	Length
1.	"Comin' in Cold"	Jaron Boyer; Matt Gorman; Jake Puliti; Kaylin Roberson	3:00
2.	"Ashes" (featuring Diplo)	Josh Miller; Thomas Wesley Pentz; Jimmy Robbins; Josh Serrato; Austin Shawn; Chris Tompkins; Bailey Zimmerman	3:03
3.	"Chevy Silverado"	Tucker Beathard; Ilsey Juber; Gavin Lucas; Heath Warren; Zimmerman	3:41
4.	"Yours for the Breaking"	Bart Butler; Jacob Davis; Drew Fulk; Shawn	3:19
5.	"Lost" (featuring the Kid Laroi)	Rodney Clawson; Charlton Howard; Ryan Hurd; Michael Lotten; Shawn; Billy Walsh; Zimmerman	3:16
6.	"Holy Smokes"	Lauren Hungate; Shawn; Ben Stennis; Michael Tyler; Zimmerman	3:15
7.	"When It Was"	Kelly Archer; Ben Goldsmith; Carson Wallace; Ben Williams	3:12
8.	"It's All Good"	Beathard; David Dorn; Ryan Tyndell	2:50
9.	"Backup Plan" (featuring Luke Combs)	Beathard; Jimi Bell; Jon Sherwood	3:01
10.	"New to Country"	Tim Galloway; Jacob Hackworth; Shawn; Warren; Zimmerman	2:57
11.	"At the Same Time"	Jaxson Free; Aldae; Ben Johnson	2:57
12.	"Hell or High Water"	Ashley Gorley; Shawn	3:14
13.	"These Nights"	Nora Collins; Randall Fowler; Mary Kutter; Brad Wagner	3:39
14.	"Everything But Up"	Devin Dawson; Hackworth; Sam Martinez; Warren	3:31
15.	"Before You"	Brian Alexander; Fowler; Marty James; Frank Romano; Shawn; Zimmerman	2:51
16.	"Holding On"	Shawn; Blake Whiten	3:50
17.	"Dare You to Try It"	Beathard; Lucas; Martinez; Shawn; Warren; Zimmerman	3:03
18.	"Happy Ever After Me"	Beathard; Bell	2:47
Total length:			57:35

== Personnel ==
Credits adapted from Tidal.

=== Musicians ===
- Bailey Zimmerman – lead vocals
- Austin Shawn – background vocals (all tracks), programming (tracks 1–16, 18), drums (6, 12), bass (7, 10–12), strings (11), drum programming (17)
- Tim Galloway – acoustic guitar (1–16, 18), mandolin (1–4, 7, 13, 14, 16, 18), banjo (1, 2, 7, 9, 10, 14, 18), electric guitar (1, 3–7, 10, 12, 13, 16–18), bouzouki (2, 8, 10, 17), pedal steel guitar (2), 12-string guitar (3, 7, 9, 13), slide guitar (6, 17), nylon-strung guitar (15), bass (17)
- Dave Cohen – piano (1–4, 6–8, 13, 17, 18), synthesizer (2–5, 7, 8, 13, 15–18), organ (3–5, 7, 10, 13, 14, 16, 18), strings (6, 12, 15, 16), Hammond B3 organ (9, 17), Wurlitzer (9), keyboards (10, 12, 16)
- Scotty Sanders – pedal steel guitar (1, 5, 17), steel guitar (3, 4, 7, 8, 13, 14, 18), Dobro (6)
- Rob McNelley – electric guitar (1, 3–5, 7–9, 13, 15, 18), slide guitar (9)
- Jerry Roe – drums, percussion (1, 3–5, 8–10, 13–15, 18)
- Jimmie Lee Sloas – bass (1, 3–5, 8, 13–16, 18)
- Jenee Fleenor – fiddle (1, 4, 12, 16)
- Matt McVaney – acoustic guitar (1), piano (15)
- Josh Serrato – bass, electric guitar (2)
- Andrew Peebles – background vocals (6)
- Michael Rinne – bass (6)
- Justin Schipper – pedal steel guitar (6)
- Adam Ernst – electric guitar (7)
- Steve Mackey – bass (9)
- Luke Combs – featured vocals (9)
- Ben Johnson – Rhodes piano (11)
- Brandon Hood – slide guitar (11, 15)
- Kurt Ozan – pedal steel guitar (12, 16, 17)
- MacKenzie Carpenter – background vocals (13)
- Chris McHugh – drums (16)
- Brendan Orchard – electric guitar (16)
- Travis Toy – pedal steel guitar (16)
- Bryan Sutton – acoustic guitar (17)

=== Technical ===
- Austin Shawn – production, mixing (all tracks); mastering (tracks 1, 3–18), engineering (6, 9, 10, 12, 16), additional engineering (1, 3–5, 7, 8, 11, 13, 17, 18), digital editing (1, 3–5, 7–11, 13–15, 17, 18)
- Diplo – production (2)
- Josh Serrato – production (2)
- Jim Cooley – mixing (all tracks), engineering (16)
- Eric Lagg – mastering (2)
- Josh Ditty – engineering (1, 15)
- Drew Bollman – engineering (3, 5, 7–9, 11, 13, 14, 17, 18)
- Sean Phelan – engineering (5)
- Chip Matthews – engineering (9)
- Brian David Willis – digital editing (1, 3–5, 7–9, 11, 13–15, 17, 18)
- Katelyn Prieboy – engineering assistance (1, 15)
- Zach Kulhman – engineering assistance (3–5, 7–9, 11, 13, 14, 17, 18)
- Austin Brown – engineering assistance (3–5, 7, 8, 11, 13, 14, 17, 18)
- Chris Vanoverberghe – engineering assistance (3–5, 7, 8, 11, 13, 14, 17, 18)
- Bryan Gomez – engineering assistance (5)
- Jacob Dendy – engineering assistance (5)
- Mate Gere – engineering assistance (5)
- Alyson McAnally – production coordination (1, 3–5, 7–11, 13–15, 17, 18)

== Charts ==
=== Weekly charts ===
Weekly chart performance for Different Night Same Rodeo
Chart (2025–2026)	Peak position
Australian Albums (ARIA)	77
Australian Country Albums (ARIA)	8
Canadian Albums (Billboard)	10
UK Album Downloads (Official Charts)	31
UK Country Albums (Official Charts)	6
US Billboard 200	12
US Top Country Albums (Billboard)	3

=== Year-end charts ===
Year-end chart performance for Different Night Same Rodeo
Chart (2025)	Position
US Top Country Albums (Billboard)	58

== Certifications ==
Certifications for Different Night Same Rodeo
Region	Certification	Certified units/sales
Canada (Music Canada)	Gold	40,000^{‡}
^{‡} Sales+streaming figures based on certification alone.
