= Strong Enough (Jonas Brothers song) =

2023 single by Jonas Brothers featuring Bailey Zimmerman

Single by Jonas Brothers featuring Bailey Zimmerman
- Released: November 10, 2023
- Genre: Pop; country; Americana
- Length: 2:29
- Label: Republic
- Songwriters: Jonathan Bellion; Jordan K. Johnson; Stefan Johnson; Thomas Hull; Sir Michael Jagger; Keith Richards; Michael Pollack; Amy Allen
- Producers: Bellion; The Monsters & Strangerz; Kid Harpoon

Jonas Brothers singles chronology
"Year 3000 2.0" (2023)	"Strong Enough" (2023)	"Holiday" (2024)

Bailey Zimmerman singles chronology
"Where It Ends" (2023)	"Strong Enough" (2023)	"Holy Smokes" (2024)

Lyric video
- "Strong Enough" on YouTube

"Strong Enough" is a song by American pop rock group Jonas Brothers, featuring vocals from American country music singer Bailey Zimmerman. It was released as a single through Republic Records on November 10, 2023. Producers Jon Bellion, the Monsters & Strangerz (Jordan K. Johnson and Stefan Johnson), and Kid Harpoon wrote the song alongside lead singer Mick Jagger and guitarist Keith Richards from the English rock band the Rolling Stones and songwriters Michael Pollack and Amy Allen. Vocals were handled by Nick and Joe of the Jonas Brothers, as well as Zimmerman.

== Background ==
In a press release, the band and the singer both spoke about the other. The Jonas Brothers said: "We're so excited to team up with Bailey for 'Strong Enough'! He's such a talented artist who's had an amazing year, so it's been a blast collaborating with him". Zimmerman said: "I've been a fan of the Jonas Brothers for as long as I can remember. I literally grew up with them! It's been incredible to get to know Joe, Nick, and Kevin, and we've already shared some memories I'll never forget. The fact that they would ask me to be on a song still blows my mind. I hope y'all like it as much as I do!".

== Composition and lyrics ==
"Strong Enough" is a pop song that incorporates country and Americana and sees Zimmerman starting the song off: "Been a hell of a week, but we made it, yeah, we made it / Hear the bar shuttin’ down, but we stayin', yeah, we stayin' / Only got so long 'til the morning comes / And life is too short to be wasted". He, along with Nick and Joe Jonas assist on the chorus: "So light me up / Twist me something good / Make it strong enough, last long enough". A midtempo track, harmonies are present in the chorus and includes guitar riffs and a relaxed instrumental.

== Credits and personnel ==
- Jonas Brothers
  - Nick Jonas – vocals, background vocals, bass guitar
  - Joe Jonas – vocals, background vocals
  - Kevin Jonas – guitar, background vocals
- Jon Bellion – production, songwriting, background vocals, programming
- The Monsters & Strangerz
  - Jordan K. Johnson – production, songwriting, drums, keyboards, programming
  - Stefan Johnson – drums, keyboards, programming, vocal production, engineering
- Kid Harpoon – production, songwriting, guitar
- Mick Jagger – songwriting
- Keith Richards – songwriting
- Michael Pollack – songwriting, background vocals
- Amy Allen – songwriting
- JinJoo Lee – guitar
- James Valentine – guitar
- Pierre-Luc Rioux – guitar
- Jack Lawless – drums
- Gian Stone – vocal production
- Austin Shaw – vocal production
- Serban Ghenea – mixing
- Bryce Bordone – mixing assistance
- David Silberstein – production coordination
- Jeremy Levin – production coordination
- Christian Johnson – production coordination

== Charts ==
Chart performance for "Strong Enough"
Chart (2023–2024)	Peak position
Croatia (HRT)	40
New Zealand Hot Singles (RMNZ)	19
Poland (Polish Airplay Top 100)	6
US Bubbling Under Hot 100 (Billboard)	16
US Adult Pop Airplay (Billboard)	40
US Pop Airplay (Billboard)	25
