= Backup Plan =

2025 single by Bailey Zimmerman featuring Luke Combs

Single by Bailey Zimmerman featuring Luke Combs

from the album Different Night Same Rodeo
- Released: May 2, 2025
- Genre: Country
- Length: 3:01
- Label: Atlantic; Warner Nashville
- Songwriters: Jimi Bell; Jon Sherwood; Tucker Beathard
- Producer: Austin Shawn

Bailey Zimmerman singles chronology
| "All the Way" (2025) | "Backup Plan" (2025) | "Ashes" (2025) |

Luke Combs singles chronology
| "Guy for That" (2024) | "Backup Plan" (2025) | "Back in the Saddle" (2025) |

Music video
- "Backup Plan" on YouTube

"Backup Plan" is a song by American country music singer Bailey Zimmerman featuring American country singer Luke Combs. It was released on May 2, 2025 as the second single from Zimmerman's second studio album, Different Night Same Rodeo. The song was written by Jimi Bell, Jon Sherwood and Tucker Beathard and produced by Austin Shawn.

== Background ==
During an appearance on The Bobby Bones Show, Bailey Zimmerman revealed that he immediately wanted to collaborate with Luke Combs on the song after listening to the demo, but had not met him yet. He did not have his phone number or feel comfortable with obtaining it from someone else. Combs invited Zimmerman to perform at the "Concert for Carolina" in October 2024, where they met for the first time, became friends and exchanged numbers. Zimmerman sent the song to Combs through text, but he did not respond until a month later, when he agreed to collaborate.

Zimmerman first previewed a snippet of the song on January 27, 2025, his 25th birthday, presenting it as a solo track. On April 21, he revealed it to be a duet with Combs as they teased the song. They debuted the song live at the 2025 Stagecoach Festival, where they also filmed the music video.

== Composition and lyrics ==
The song is driven by electric guitar, while the lyrics are about chasing one's dreams, with an emphasis on staying focused and not allowing detractors to hinder one's progress. The pair sings in the chorus, "So if you got a fire don't lose it / If you got a do or die dream do it / If you got something to prove go on and prove it / Don't let nobody clip your wings / Keep your head down, keep on the blinders / Tune out the doubters and all the closed-minders / If it's in your blood, falling down ain't enough / To change who you were born to be / And gettin' back up, that’s the only backup plan you need."

== Music video ==
An official music video was released alongside the single. It was directed by Jenny Stoff and Chris Perkel and produced by Gregory Vanger and Ryley Fogg. The clip depicts Bailey Zimmerman and Luke Combs' performance of the song at Stagecoach.

== Charts ==
=== Weekly charts ===
Weekly chart performance for "Backup Plan"
| Chart (2025) | Peak position |
|---|---|
| Australia Country Hot 50 (The Music) | 1 |
| Canada Hot 100 (Billboard) | 29 |
| Canada Country (Billboard) | 1 |
| Global 200 (Billboard) | 139 |
| New Zealand Hot Singles (RMNZ) | 3 |
| UK Country Airplay (Radiomonitor) | 1 |
| US Billboard Hot 100 | 30 |
| US Country Airplay (Billboard) | 2 |
| US Hot Country Songs (Billboard) | 6 |

=== Year-end charts ===
Year-end chart performance for "Backup Plan"
| Chart (2025) | Position |
|---|---|
| Canada (Canadian Hot 100) | 51 |
| US Billboard Hot 100 | 80 |
| US Country Airplay (Billboard) | 35 |
| US Hot Country Songs (Billboard) | 22 |

== Certifications ==
Certifications for "Backup Plan"
| Region | Certification | Certified units/sales |
|---|---|---|
| Australia (ARIA) | Gold | 35,000^{‡} |
| Canada (Music Canada) | Platinum | 80,000^{‡} |
| New Zealand (RMNZ) | Gold | 15,000^{‡} |
| United States (RIAA) | Platinum | 1,000,000^{‡} |
^{‡} Sales+streaming figures based on certification alone.
