= Lost (Bailey Zimmerman song) =

2025 single by Bailey Zimmerman featuring the Kid Laroi

Single by Bailey Zimmerman featuring the Kid Laroi

from the album Different Night Same Rodeo
- Released: August 8, 2025
- Genre: Country pop
- Length: 3:16
- Label: Atlantic; Warner Nashville
- Songwriters: Bailey Zimmerman; Austin Shawn; Billy Walsh; Charlton Howard; Michael Lotten; Rodney Clawson; Ryan Hurd
- Producer: Shawn

Bailey Zimmerman singles chronology
"Ashes" (2025)	"Lost" (2025)	"Chevy Silverado" (2025)

The Kid Laroi singles chronology
"Hot Girl Problems" (2025)	"Lost" (2025)	"She Don't Need to Know" (2025)

Music video
- "Lost" on YouTube

"Lost" is a song by American country music singer Bailey Zimmerman featuring Australian rapper the Kid Laroi. It was released on August 8, 2025, as the fourth single from his second studio album, Different Night Same Rodeo.

On September 1, 2025, Absolute Country Radio in the UK listed the single as the Record of the Week.

On September 7, 2025, the artists performed the song at the 2025 MTV Video Music Awards.

== Background ==
After the Kid Laroi performed at a private show in Nashville, Tennessee, he spent a night with Bailey Zimmerman in the city, following which they decided to collaborate. In an interview with Billboard, Zimmerman recalled:

He's like, "I want to have dinner with Bailey." I've listened to his songs since like 2016 and had just started. We got to dinner and I was nervous — so [we] got there and he was the nicest guy ever. We get along [about] everything, and all of just what we believe in and life and our careers — it was like the Spider-Man thing where I was pointing at myself. We had a wild night in Nashville, went out to Morgan's — I took him to Loser's, and the next morning he pushed his flight back because he wanted to have breakfast. On the way there, he was like, "Last night, you played me a song. Can you play that again?" and I had played him "Lost". He kept asking to hear it, so I asked him to get on the song.

Further speculation with people spotting Zimmerman and The Kid Laroi walking through Las Vegas in July 2025 and by July 23, 2025, ASCAP confirmed the song 'Lost' had been registered.

== Composition and lyrics ==
"Lost" has been described as a "pop, pop rap, and country crossover" and pop-country. Over an instrumental composed mainly of synthesizers, it centers on the artists feeling lost after breaking up with their respective lovers. Bailey Zimmerman notes how his surroundings have not changed but he has felt different since the breakup, while the Kid Laroi feels like his ex-girlfriend was never interested in him to begin with, even though he became close with her friends and family, and questions if he should also cut ties with them.

== Critical reception ==
The song received generally positive reviews. Maxim Mower of Holler wrote "The duo's respective sounds complement each other seamlessly, with Zimmerman's atmospheric vibrato combining with LAROI's sleek, Auto-Tuned croons to produce a galvanising earworm. They might be singing about the pain of heartbreak, but it's hard not to feel the urge to dance along to this infectious anthem." He went on to remark, "Zimmerman serves up a timely reminder to fans of his ability to craft a pop-leaning smash. His charismatic vibrato glides across the energising, synth-driven instrumental, before LAROI enters the fray for the reflective second verse. What makes 'Lost' especially enjoyable is the fact that it feels like a genuine collaboration, with Zimmerman and LAROI trading lyrics and offering ad-libs throughout the whole track, rather than the guest simply turning up for a few lines and then dipping." Max Buondonno of Country Central considered it "perhaps the most infuriatingly enjoyable track" on Different Night Same Rodeo and commented "annoyingly enough, it's a bop. The sheer concept of a song of this nature almost forces an eye-roll due to its cash-grabby nature, but let the chorus run through once, and you'll be bumping your head to the backbeat and singing along. It's infectious without saying much of anything, playing well to Zimmerman's ear for catchy melodies and hooks." James Daykin of Entertainment Focus regarded the song as a standout from the album and "country version of The Weeknd's 'Blinding Lights'" with respect to production, stating "It's bold, inventive and surprisingly effective but then with Ryan Hurd's experience as one of the many co-writers what would you expect?"

== Music video ==
The music video was released on August 8, 2025. The artists had filmed the video in Nevada in July 2025 and spent a day in Las Vegas before filming. The clip shows Bailey Zimmerman and the Kid Laroi driving a Chevrolet SEMA truck and black limousine respectively in the middle of the desert. Zimmerman also does donuts around the limo.

== Charts ==
Chart performance for "Lost"
Chart (2025)	Peak position
Australia Artist (ARIA)	17
Canada Hot 100 (Billboard)	60
New Zealand Hot Singles (RMNZ)	13
Portugal Airplay (AFP)	12
UK Country Airplay (Holler)	19
US Billboard Hot 100	86
US Hot Country Songs (Billboard)	24
