= Nobody's Everything =

Studio album by Tucker Beathard
- Released: November 30, 2018
- Recorded: 2018
- Genre: Country
- Length: 31:28
- Label: Warner Nashville
- Producer: Tucker Beathard, Ryan Tyndell

Tucker Beathard chronology
Fight Like Hell (2016)	Nobody's Everything (2018)	King (2020)

Singles from Nobody's Everything
- 1. "Leave Me Alone" Released: November 26, 2018

Nobody's Everything is the debut album from country music artist Tucker Beathard. The album was released after a year long battle with his previous record label shelving his planned debut album a year earlier, then titled Dear Someone. It serves as the first part of a double album, with part two expected to be released in 2020.

== Background ==
After releasing his debut EP in late 2016, Beathard doubled down work on his debut album.

In November 2017, Beathard announced his debut album titled "Dear Someone", the album was to be released November 17, 2017 but the night before the albums released Beathard announced that the album had been postponed citing creative differences with his then label Dot Records.

After the delay of his debut album, Beathard channeled his frustrations via his social media sites. He began leaking demo tracks that he written and recorded and wanted to share with his fans. The first one being the fan favorite "Chasing You With Whiskey" in December 2017.

In January 2018 Beathard was released from his contract with Dot Records, after that Beathard began leaking multiple demos to his social media sites and via his official YouTube account.

From January 2018 through early November 2018 Bethard leaked the following demo tracks via his social media sites and YouTube "Goodbye Amy", "New Me", "I Don't Miss You Now", "Perfect Imperfections", "Same Kinda Different", "This Life", "Ride On", Caught Me On A Good Night", "He Was", "Kiss Me With A Lie", "Hall of Fame", "Nobody's Everything", "New Used Oldsmobile", "She Ain't Right", "Over", "Nobody's Everything", "You Would Think Of Me", "The Closest Thing","Time These Days", "Your Dreams", "It'd Hurt Me More If You Kept Hanging Around", "Smokin' Things" and "Better Than Me".

Beathard stated he wanted to share what he was writing and recorded so his fans could get a feel what his debut album would be like.

On November 26, 2018 Beathard announced via Rolling Stone that his debut album would be titled "Nobody's Everything" and will be released November 30, 2018. The album's title comes from one of the demo tracks Beathard leaked over the summer, however the track is not included on the album.

During the announcement Beathard also revealed the lead single would be titled "Leave Me Alone" a track a recorded and leaked earlier in the year, Beathard stated the track was a reflection of how he felt during the turmoil with his previous record label.

== Track listing ==
No.	Title	Length
1.	"Ride On"	3:23
2.	"Leave Me Alone"	3:43
3.	"Somethin' to Say"	2:22
4.	"Picture to Prove It"	3:35
5.	"Brother"	3:25
6.	"Fight Like Hell"	3:04
7.	"Hate It"	3:43
8.	"This Life"	3:26
9.	"How Long Will I Go"	4:47
Total length:		31:28

== Personnel ==
Credits adapted from AllMusic.

- Tucker Beathard – acoustic guitar, drums, electric guitar, percussion, lead vocals, background vocals
- Chris Henderson – electric guitar
- Jordan Rigby – bass guitar, background vocals
- Ryan Tyndell – acoustic guitar, electric guitar, keyboards], percussion, background vocals
