= Just Believe (song) =

Single by Bailey Zimmerman and Brandon Lake
- Released: March 13, 2026
- Genre: Country; southern gospel
- Length: 2:41
- Label: Atlantic; Warner Nashville
- Songwriters: Zimmerman; Lake; Austin Shawn; Josh Philips
- Producer: Shawn

Bailey Zimmerman singles chronology
"Chevy Silverado" (2025)	"Just Believe" (2026)

Brandon Lake singles chronology
"No Idols" (2026)	"Just Believe" (2026)	"The Jesus I Know Now" (2026)

"Just Believe" is a song recorded by the American country musician Bailey Zimmerman and the American contemporary Christian musician Brandon Lake. The song was released as a single on March 13, 2026, via Atlantic Records and Warner Records Nashville. It was written by Zimmerman, Lake, Austin Shawn, and Josh Philips, while production was handled by Shawn.

== Background ==
"Just Believe" is one of several songs released or teased by Lake in collaboration with a mainstream country musician. One of the first examples of this includes "Hard Fought Hallelujah", a song by him and Jelly Roll, which was released in November 2024 to great commercial acclaim. The song won the Grammy Award for Best Contemporary Christian Music Performance/Song and completed 2025 as, not only the best-selling Christian song of the year, but also the 84th best selling song of the year overall in the United States. In addition to these songs, Lake also hosted a writers' retreat in Nashville, Tennessee, in which he and twenty-five other country musicians wrote forty-three Christianity-themed songs. Zimmerman was among the retreat's attendees, as well as other notable country musicians such as Thomas Rhett, Tyler Hubbard, Dan + Shay, and Lainey Wilson.

== Release and promotion ==
"Just Believe" was released following teasers being uploaded to social media platforms. On March 9, 2026, the release date was announced via Instagram, and the song was made available for pre-save. The song was debuted live at a performance in Detroit, Michigan. On March 13, 2026, "Just Believe" was released to digital download and streaming formats, and on the same day was also released to stations of the country radio format in the United States. Upon the song's release, it was promoted by a lyric video, which was uploaded to YouTube.

== Style ==
=== Composition and production ===
Maxim Mower of Holler wrote that Zimmerman and Lake "set the tone from the outset" by opening the track with Lake's "powerhouse vocals over a pared-down instrumental", before Zimmerman's "atmospheric vibrato enters the fray for the first verse". Mower went on to explain that "their voices sound electric together against the fiery, dramatic backdrop of raging electric guitars and driving drums", labelling the song as a "high‑energy" track.

Many critics also made note of the song's intensity. All Country News referred to "Just Believe" as "a declaration, a faith-driven anthem that lands with the force of a lightning strike", praising Zimmerman's "raw, gritty vocal energy" and Lake's "soaring, soul-stirring delivery". The song was described as "a rare collision of country grit and spiritual resonance, a duet that feels destined to resonate far beyond the charts". In comparison with other releases of Zimmerman's, Buddy Iahn of The Music Universe claimed that the "arena-ready rock-powered country anthem" "signals the start of an exciting new era, with a faith-driven collaboration that showcases both artists at their most compelling". It has been praised that Zimmerman's vocals contain "raw, unfiltered emotion that has defined his voice from the beginning" while Lake contributes with "the spiritual fire that turns a simple lyric into a declaration".

=== Lyrics and meaning ===
WXTU explained that the title and chorus "suggest themes of faith, perseverance and trust", similar to themes that "often appear in Lake's songwriting and resonate strongly with his audience". Mower observed that Lake and Zimmerman "stress throughout 'Just Believe' that they are far from perfect, and that's precisely why they need to rely so heavily on their faith in Jesus", adding that the song "utilise[s] a range of Biblical imagery, referencing the fire and brimstone of God's punishment with the clever lyric 'brimstone baggage'". Grant Bromley of Country Music Nation explained that the song "sees belief in Jesus as a remedy to the problems in the world and the rule of sin". He noted that it was simailar to 1 Corinthians 10:13, which states:

No temptation has overtaken you except what is common to mankind. And God is faithful; he will not let you be tempted beyond what you can bear. But when you are tempted he will also provide a way out so that you can endure it.

The song has been described as speaking of "the quiet battles, the hidden fears, the moments when you're not sure if you can take another step", and while "Just Believe" "doesn't minimize the struggle", it "reminds you that God meets you right in the middle of it". Mower observed that the song differs from stereotypes of Christian musicians who "often portray themselves to fans as being pristine and perfect", noting that Lake "makes a concerted effort throughout his discography to emphasise that he is just like everyone else, in that he has to contend with flaws and doubts". In "Just Believe", Lake and Zimmerman "declare that you don't need to worry about a long list of 'dos' and 'don'ts' and complex ideologies - all you need to do is 'Just Believe' in God and Jesus". Critics also described the track as "a song that sounds like someone reaching into the dark and saying, 'Don't quit. Don't give up. God isn't finished with you'", while the track is "a song that feels like a lifeline for anyone who's been praying for breakthrough, fighting through doubt, or trying to hold on when the night feels long".

Several critics observed that "Just Believe" has significance in Zimmerman's personal life. Country Music Nation reported that the phrase "just believe" has "been tattooed to Bailey's right wrist for several years now, speaking to its significance in his own life", while Good Christian Music wrote that Zimmerman "stepped into [the retreat] carrying his own raw honesty", and that the resulting song "already feels like an invitation — not to pretend everything is fine, not to push down the weight you’re carrying, but to lift your eyes long enough to remember that God still moves, still rescues, still answers, still saves".

== Reception ==
=== Public ===
All Country News reported that the surprise performance during Lake's premierring performance in Detroit "sent the crowd into a frenzy, as Zimmerman's raw, gritty vocal energy collided with Lake's soaring, soul-stirring delivery". Country Music Nation described the same performance by saying that "the audience enthusiastically welcomed Zimmerman's surprise appearance", presenting the live reaction as an early indicator of the song's public response.

=== Critical ===
"Just Believe" received generally positive reception from critics, with commentators praising both the song's emotional style and its cross-genre ambition. All Country News praised that the track "isn't just a song, it's a declaration, a faith-driven anthem". The article placed it as a standout within both artists' discographies. Mower praised the way that "their voices sound electric together against the fiery, dramatic backdrop of raging electric guitars and driving drums", describing the song as a "rousing, soul-stirring anthem". Good Christian Music stated that Zimmerman and Lake "create a song that feels like a lifeline". Melinda Newman of Billboard described the track as "an uplifting ode", praising the track's "soulful, powerhouse vocals".

=== Commercial ===
Within its first charting frame, "Just Believe" debuted at its peak position of number 29 on Recorded Music NZ's Hot Singles chart. In the United States, it opened upon the Billboard Hot Christian Songs and Hot Country Songs charts at respective numbers 10 and 50. On the overall Digital Song Sales chart, the track peaked at number 5, while on the Christian Digital Song Sales chart, it led for one week.

== Personnel ==
Credits adapted from Spotify.

=== Performers ===
- Austin Shawn – piano, background vocals
- Bailey Zimmerman – lead vocals, background vocals
- Brandon Lake – lead vocals, background vocals
- Dave Cohen – organ
- Jerry Roe – drums
- Jimmie Lee Sloas – bass
- Tim Galloway – banjo, 12-string guitar, acoustic guitar, electric guitar

=== Production ===
- Austin Shawn – writer, programming
- Bailey Zimmerman – writer
- Brandon Lake – writer
- Brian David Willis – editing
- Buckley Miller – recording
- Jim Cooley – mixing, immersive audio
- Josh Philips – writer, digital editor, masterer, mixing, producer, recording

== Charts ==
Weekly chart performance for "Just Believe"
Chart (2026)	Peak position
Australian Christian Airplay (TCM)	25
New Zealand Hot Singles (RMNZ)	29
US Digital Song Sales (Billboard)	5
US Hot Christian Songs (Billboard)	10
US Hot Country Songs (Billboard)	50

== Release history ==
Release history for "Just Believe"
Region	Date	Format	Label	Ref.
Various	March 13, 2026	Digital download; streaming	Atlantic; Warner Nashville	
United States	March 13, 2026	Country radio	Atlantic; Warner Nashville	
