= Fix'n to Break =

2023 song by Bailey Zimmerman

Promotional single by Bailey Zimmerman

from the album Religiously. The Album.
- Released: February 10, 2023
- Genre: Country
- Length: 3:52
- Label: Warner Nashville; Elektra
- Songwriters: Bailey Zimmerman; Austin Shawn; Chandler Walters; Gavin Lucas; Sergio Sanchez
- Producer: Shawn

"Fix'n to Break" is a song by American country music singer Bailey Zimmerman, released on February 10, 2023 as the second promotional single from his debut studio album Religiously. The Album. (2023). It was written by Zimmerman himself, the producer Austin Shawn, Chandler Walters, Gavin Lucas and Sergio Sanchez.

== Background ==
"Fix'n to Break" was co-written by Zimmerman with collaborators including Austin Shawn, Gavin Lucas, Chandler Walters, and Sergio Sanchez. In a Music Connection Magazine interview, Zimmerman described “Fix’n to Break” as coming directly from a real feeling in relationships — one most people have experienced but don’t always want to voice.

== Lyrics and composition ==
The song uses acoustic and steel guitar, soaring background vocals and a hint of banjo in the instrumental, while lyrically it depicts Bailey Zimmerman in an unstable relationship that he is unsure will continue. In the opening verse, he describes that he can physically fix many things but admits he may not be able to mend a broken relationship, although he is still hopeful. He directly questions his lover about the state of their love, asking "Are we fixin' to break?" In the second verse, Zimmerman compares their relationship to a house that could potentially collapse. Overall, he acknowledges that while he is willing to put effort into strengthening their relationship, it may be impossible if his partner is unwilling to do the same. He considers the possibility of having to start a relationship with someone else instead.

The song is played in the key of F major and has a Camel notation of 7B. It also has a tempo of 152 beats per minute (BPM) and a duration of 3 minutes and 53 seconds.

== Critical reception ==
“Fix’n to Break” received generally positive commentary from country music publications, with critics highlighting its emotional honesty and Zimmerman’s vocal delivery. Country Now described the song as an introspective portrayal of a relationship nearing collapse, emphasizing the tension created by its vulnerable lyrics and gritty performance. Taste of Country similarly characterized the track as an emotional reflection on romantic uncertainty, noting its relatable premise and direct songwriting.

== Commercial performance ==
“Fix’n to Break” debuted and peaked at No. 84 on the Billboard Hot 100, No. 23 on Hot Country Songs, and No. 83 on the Canadian Hot 100 during the week of February 25, 2023. It was certified Gold by RIAA and Music Canada.

== Charts ==
Chart performance for "Fix'n to Break"
Chart (2023)	Peak position
Canada Hot 100 (Billboard)	83
US Billboard Hot 100	84
US Hot Country Songs (Billboard)	23

== Certifications ==
Region	Certification	Certified units/sales
Canada (Music Canada)	Gold	40,000^{‡}
United States (RIAA)	Gold	500,000^{‡}
^{‡} Sales+streaming figures based on certification alone.
