= Holy Smokes (Bailey Zimmerman song) =

Single by Bailey Zimmerman

from the album Different Night Same Rodeo
- Released: June 10, 2024
- Genre: Country; country rock; country pop
- Length: 3:15
- Label: Warner Nashville; Elektra
- Songwriters: Austin Shawn; Bailey Zimmerman; Ben Stennis; Lauren Hungate; Michael Tyler
- Producer: Austin Shawn

Bailey Zimmerman singles chronology
"Strong Enough" (2023)	"Holy Smokes" (2024)	"All the Way" (2025)

Lyric video
- "Holy Smokes" on YouTube

"Holy Smokes" is a song by American country music singer Bailey Zimmerman. It was released as a promotional single on February 23, 2024, after being teased across his social media platforms, and was released on June 10, 2024, as the lead single from Zimmerman's second studio album, Different Night Same Rodeo.

== Background ==
On January 26, 2024, a mysterious 15 second a cappella recording was released on Bailey Zimmerman's Spotify account. It was titled using emojis. Fans speculated it would be a snippet of his next single. The title "Holy Smokes" was revealed on January 29, 2023, through an extended 40 second snippet published on his social media platforms. The snippet went viral, achieving millions of views within a day.

He performed the song live for the first time during the opening show for Religiously. The Tour. on February 1, 2024. After weeks of anticipiation, Zimmerman announced the song on February 16, 2024. It was released the following week.

== Content ==
Bailey Zimmerman wrote the song with Austin Shawn, Ben Stennis, Lauren Hungate and Michael Tyler. Jeremy Chua of Taste of Country described the song as a nostalgic ballad that blends themes of romance and spirituality, portraying nights filled with rebellion and youthful affection in the setting of a church parking lot. It was complemented for its elegant piano, energetic percussion, and emotionally charged country-rock chorus.

Zimmerman described the song as a track that "takes me back to the first time I fell in love at 17".

== Commercial performance ==
"Holy Smokes" debuted at number 13 on the Billboard Hot Country Songs chart dated March 5, 2024. It also debuted at number 54 on the Billboard Hot 100. It peaked at number 10 the week of April 26, 2025, making it his first single to miss number one.

== Charts ==
=== Weekly charts ===
Weekly chart performance for "Holy Smokes"
Chart (2024–2025)	Peak position
Canada Hot 100 (Billboard)	46
Canada Country (Billboard)	46
New Zealand Hot Singles (RMNZ)	19
US Billboard Hot 100	54
US Country Airplay (Billboard)	10
US Hot Country Songs (Billboard)	13

=== Year-end charts ===
2024 year-end chart performance for "Holy Smokes"
Chart (2024)	Position
US Hot Country Songs (Billboard)	37

2025 year-end chart performance for "Holy Smokes"
Chart (2025)	Position
US Country Airplay (Billboard)	39
US Hot Country Songs (Billboard)	39

== Certifications ==
Certifications for "Holy Smokes"
Region	Certification	Certified units/sales
Canada (Music Canada)	2× Platinum	160,000^{‡}
United States (RIAA)	Platinum	1,000,000^{‡}
^{‡} Sales+streaming figures based on certification alone.

== Release history ==
Release history for "Holy Smokes"
Region	Date	Format	Version	Label
Various	February 23, 2024	Digital download; streaming	Original	Warner Nashville; Elektra
United States	June 10, 2024	Country radio	Original	Warner Nashville; Elektra
