= Where It Ends =

Single by Bailey Zimmerman

from the album Religiously. The Album.
- Released: October 2, 2023
- Genre: Country; country rock
- Length: 2:59
- Label: Warner Nashville; Elektra
- Songwriters: Bailey Zimmerman; Grant Averill; Joe Spargur
- Producer: Austin Shawn

Bailey Zimmerman singles chronology
"Won't Back Down" (2023)	"Where It Ends" (2023)	"Strong Enough" (2023)

Music video
- "Where It Ends" on YouTube

"Where It Ends" is a song by American country music singer Bailey Zimmerman. It was released on October 2, 2023, as the fourth single from his debut studio album Religiously. The Album. Zimmerman wrote the song with Grant Averill and Joe Spargur.

== Content ==
Bailey Zimmerman wrote the song with Grant Averill and Joe Spargur. Jeremy Chua of Taste of Country described the song as having a country rock sound and a lyric about heartbreak.

Zimmerman described the song as reflecting "wasted energy" when attempting to reconcile a relationship that was not working out for him.

== Commercial performance ==
"Where It Ends" debuted at number seven on the Billboard Hot Country Songs chart dated September 3, 2022. This achievement marked him as the first artist to have three consecutive debut entries simultaneously featured in the top 10. It also debuted at No. 32 on the Billboard Hot 100, a peak achieved mostly through streaming of the song, as it was not yet a radio single.

After being re-released as a radio single, it became his fourth consecutive top ten single on the Country Airplay chart.

== Music video ==
The music video for "Where It Ends" premiered on September 1, 2022. The video continues from the previous music video for "Rock and a Hard Place" where Zimmerman drives to his ex-girlfriend's house to pick up his belongings before storming out of her home, declaring this is where the relationship ends.

== Charts ==
=== Weekly charts ===
Weekly chart performance for "Where It Ends"
Chart (2023–2024)	Peak position
Australia Country Hot 50 (The Music)	4
Canada Hot 100 (Billboard)	21
Canada Country (Billboard)	1
Global 200 (Billboard)	68
US Billboard Hot 100	32
US Country Airplay (Billboard)	1
US Hot Country Songs (Billboard)	6

=== Year-end charts ===
2022 year-end chart performance for "Where It Ends"
Chart (2022)	Position
US Hot Country Songs (Billboard)	76

2024 year-end chart performance for "Where It Ends"
Chart (2024)	Position
US Billboard Hot 100	87
US Country Airplay (Billboard)	4
US Hot Country Songs (Billboard)	60

== Certifications ==
Certifications for "Where It Ends"
Region	Certification	Certified units/sales
Australia (ARIA)	Platinum	70,000^{‡}
Canada (Music Canada)	4× Platinum	320,000^{‡}
New Zealand (RMNZ)	Gold	15,000^{‡}
United States (RIAA)	3× Platinum	3,000,000^{‡}
^{‡} Sales+streaming figures based on certification alone.

== Release history ==
Release history for "Where It Ends"
Region	Date	Format	Version	Label
Various	August 19, 2022	Digital download; streaming	Original	Warner Nashville; Elektra
United States	October 2, 2023	Digital download; streaming	Country radio	Warner Nashville; Elektra
