= Religiously (song) =

Single by Bailey Zimmerman

from the album Religiously. The Album.
- Released: March 17, 2023
- Genre: Country
- Length: 2:58
- Label: Warner Nashville; Elektra
- Songwriters: Marty James; Alex Palmer; Frank Romano; Austin Shawn; Bailey Zimmerman
- Producer: Austin Shawn

Bailey Zimmerman singles chronology
"Rock and a Hard Place" (2022)	"Religiously" (2023)	"Won't Back Down" (2023)

Music video
- "Religiously" on YouTube

"Religiously" is a song by American country music singer Bailey Zimmerman. It was released on March 17, 2023 as the third single from his debut studio album Religiously. The Album. Zimmerman wrote the song with Alex Palmer, Frank Romano, Marty James, and producer Austin Shawn.

== History ==
The song uses religious imagery to convey the narrator's heartbreak after ending a relationship with a woman. In the chorus, Zimmerman sings "I ain't got the only woman who was there for me religiously." Following the song's release, Zimmerman also released a music video which portrays the song's central theme of breakup.

== Charts ==
=== Weekly charts ===
Weekly chart performance for "Religiously"
Chart (2023)	Peak position
Canada Hot 100 (Billboard)	18
Canada Country (Billboard)	1
Global 200 (Billboard)	71
US Billboard Hot 100	13
US Country Airplay (Billboard)	1
US Hot Country Songs (Billboard)	4

=== Year-end charts ===
Year-end chart performance for "Religiously"
Chart (2023)	Position
Canada (Canadian Hot 100)	56
US Billboard Hot 100	42
US Country Airplay (Billboard)	26
US Hot Country Songs (Billboard)	10

2024 year-end chart performance for "Religiously"
Chart (2024)	Position
US Hot Country Songs (Billboard)	96

== Certifications ==
Certifications for "Religiously"
Region	Certification	Certified units/sales
Australia (ARIA)	Gold	35,000^{‡}
Canada (Music Canada)	5× Platinum	400,000^{‡}
New Zealand (RMNZ)	Platinum	30,000^{‡}
United Kingdom (BPI)	Silver	200,000^{‡}
United States (RIAA)	4× Platinum	4,000,000^{‡}
^{‡} Sales+streaming figures based on certification alone.
