= Fall in Love (Bailey Zimmerman song) =

Single by Bailey Zimmerman

from the album Religiously. The Album. and the EP Leave the Light On
- Released: February 11, 2022
- Genre: Country
- Length: 3:52
- Label: Warner Nashville; Elektra
- Songwriters: Bailey Zimmerman; Austin Shawn; Gavin Lucas
- Producer: Austin Shawn

Bailey Zimmerman singles chronology
"Small Town Crazy" (2021)	"Fall in Love" (2022)	"Rock and a Hard Place" (2022)

Music video
- "Fall in Love" on YouTube

"Fall in Love" is the debut single by American country music singer Bailey Zimmerman. The song charted in June 2022, ahead of its release to radio and became Zimmerman's first number one on the Country Airplay chart, the first debut single to do so in 2022 and the fastest debut single to reach the top spot since 2015. It is the lead single from his debut EP Leave the Light On and his debut studio album Religiously. The Album.

== Content ==
Bailey Zimmerman wrote the song with Austin Shawn and Gavin Lucas. Jessica Nicholson of Billboard described the song as "lamenting" a lost love. Zimmerman came up with the song's idea in 2020, when he wrote the first verse and chorus before presenting them to Austin Shawn and Gavin Lucas at a songwriting session. Lucas thought the song had a style similar to Americana music.

== Commercial performance ==
"Fall in Love" debuted at number 54 on Billboard Country Airplay and number 9 on the same publication's Hot Country Songs chart. These peaks preceded the song's release to country radio, which occurred on July 11. The song reached number one on the Country Airplay charts on December 5, 2022.

== Charts ==
=== Weekly charts ===
Weekly chart performance for "Fall in Love"
Chart (2022)	Peak position
Canada Hot 100 (Billboard)	64
Global 200 (Billboard)	117
US Billboard Hot 100	29
US Country Airplay (Billboard)	1
US Hot Country Songs (Billboard)	5

=== Year-end charts ===
2022 year-end chart performance for "Fall in Love"
Chart (2022)	Position
US Billboard Hot 100	54
US Country Airplay (Billboard)	52
US Hot Country Songs (Billboard)	8

2023 year-end chart performance for "Fall in Love"
Chart (2023)	Position
US Hot Country Songs (Billboard)	78

== Certifications ==
Certifications for "Fall in Love"
Region	Certification	Certified units/sales
Canada (Music Canada)	7× Platinum	560,000^{‡}
New Zealand (RMNZ)	Platinum	30,000^{‡}
United States (RIAA)	6× Platinum	6,000,000^{‡}
^{‡} Sales+streaming figures based on certification alone.

== Release history ==
Release history and formats for "Fall in Love"
Region	Date	Format	Version	Label
Various	February 11, 2022	Digital download; streaming	Original	Warner Nashville; Elektra
Various	April 12, 2022	Digital download; streaming	Acoustic	Warner Nashville; Elektra
United States	July 11, 2022	Country radio	Original	Warner Nashville; Elektra
