= New to Country =

2024 song by Bailey Zimmerman

Promotional single by Bailey Zimmerman

from the album Different Night Same Rodeo
- Released: June 28, 2024
- Genre: Country
- Length: 2:57
- Label: Warner Nashville; Elektra
- Songwriters: Bailey Zimmerman; Austin Shawn; Heath Warren; Tim Galloway; Jacob Hackworth
- Producer: Shawn

Music video
- "New to Country" on YouTube

"New to Country" is a song by American country music singer Bailey Zimmerman, released on June 28, 2024, as the second promotional single from his second studio album, Different Night Same Rodeo (2025). It was written by Zimmerman himself, the producer Austin Shawn, Heath Warren, Tim Galloway and Jacob Hackworth.

== Background ==
Bailey Zimmerman created the song in response to detractors accusing him of not being "country" enough. On June 18, 2024, he teased the song on social media with a video that opens with him addressing the viewer:

Being country is about way more than wearing a cowboy hat on your head or wearing boots on your feet. I grew up country as hell and I still ain't changed, so I wrote a song about it for everybody that makes fun of me and tells me I'm not country because I wear Air Force 1s. Kiss my ass, this song's called "New To Country".

== Composition ==
The song consists of electric guitars and a drum pattern, opening with a guitar riff. Bailey Zimmerman begins the song outlining the criticism against him, such as his tattoos and party-loving lifestyle, but notes that he has always remained authentic to his country roots at heart. He emphasizes the point in the chorus, in which he sings about drinking the same alcohol and keeping his original circle of friends, additionally declaring that he will never lose his rural upbringing even if he relinquished his truck and countryside home and was in a private jet. In the second verse, Zimmerman highlights his touring of many cities and its contrast to his contentment with life in his rural hometown.

== Charts ==
Chart performance for "New to Country"
Chart (2024)	Peak position
Canada Hot 100 (Billboard)	98
US Billboard Hot 100	94
US Hot Country Songs (Billboard)	27

== Certifications ==
Certifications for "New to Country"
Region	Certification	Certified units/sales
United States (RIAA)	Gold	500,000^{‡}
^{‡} Sales+streaming figures based on certification alone.
