= Rock and a Hard Place (Bailey Zimmerman song) =

Single by Bailey Zimmerman

from the album Religiously. The Album. and the EP Leave the Light On
- Released: June 10, 2022
- Genre: Country rock
- Length: 3:27
- Label: Warner Nashville; Elektra
- Songwriters: Heath Warren; Jacob Hackworth; Jet Harvey
- Producer: Austin Shawn

Bailey Zimmerman singles chronology
"Fall in Love" (2022)	"Rock and a Hard Place" (2022)	"Religiously" (2023)

Music video
- "Rock and a Hard Place" on YouTube

"Rock and a Hard Place" is a song recorded by American country music singer Bailey Zimmerman. The song charted in June 2022, reaching number two on Billboard Hot Country Songs. It was released to country radio on December 12, 2022 as the second single from his debut EP Leave the Light On and his debut studio album Religiously. The Album.

It peaked at No. 10 on the Billboard Hot 100, breaking the record for the longest climb to the top 10 for a song by a soloist in the chart's history. It was also certified eight-times Platinum by RIAA and Diamond by Music Canada, widely considered to be his most successful song to date.

== Background ==
“Rock and a Hard Place” was written by songwriters Heath Warren, Jacob Hackworth, and Jet Harvey. Zimmerman first heard the song through an Instagram performance by co-writer Heath Warren. When considering recording a song he didn’t co-write, the first line or hook needed to immediately resonate with him. The opening line—“We’ve been swingin’ and missin’, it ain’t broke yet but damn it needs fixin’”—struck a chord because it reflected a personal experience of his. Zimmerman later recorded the song alongside his frequent producer Austin Shawn, with the pair carefully shaping its final production

== Lyrics and composition ==
The song is about a male who is facing a relationship about to break up, describing the scenario as "between a rock and a hard place". Taste of Country writer Carmen Liptak wrote that Zimmerman has "gravelly, rock-informed vocal delivery and strong storytelling skills", and compared his style to Parker McCollum and Tucker Beathard.

The song is played in the key of C# Major and has a Camel notation of 3B. It also has a tempo of 122 beats per minute (BPM) and a duration of 3 minutes and 28 seconds.

== Critical reception ==
“Rock and a Hard Place” was generally well-received by critics and country music commentators, who highlighted Bailey Zimmerman’s emotive vocal delivery and storytelling. Taste of Country praised Zimmerman’s “gravelly, rock-informed vocal delivery and strong storytelling skills". Commentators on Warner Music Nashville and related industry outlets underscored the song’s appeal to both traditional and contemporary audiences, describing Zimmerman’s vocal tone as “blistering… effortlessly gritty, fervent,” and suggesting that its fusion of country and rock influences helped broaden his reach. Nashville Music blogs and fan-oriented sites have also characterized the track as a standout on country radio. The New York Times also recognized it among the Best Songs of 2022.

== Accolades ==
Awards and nominations for "Rock and a Hard Place"
Year	Award show	Category	Nominated work	Result	Ref
2023	CMT Music Awards	Male Video of the Year	"Rock and a Hard Place"	Nominated	

== Commercial performance ==
“Rock and a Hard Place” debuted at number two on the Billboard Hot Country Songs chart and No. 24 on the Billboard Hot 100 upon its release in June 2022, driven largely by streaming activity before its official radio impact in December. The song later reached number one on the Billboard Country Airplay chart, where it stayed for six consecutive weeks beginning in April 2023, marking Zimmerman’s second Country Airplay chart-topper. On the all-genre Billboard Hot 100, the track climbed steadily to peak at number 10 after 41 weeks, setting a record for the longest ascent to the Hot 100’s top ten by a solo artist without a featured act. "Rock and a Hard Place" finished 2022 as the 70th biggest Billboard Hot 100 song. The following year, it ranked at number sixteen on the year-end chart. The song spent 54 weeks in total on the chart. Internationally, it also reached number one on the Billboard Canada Country chart and peaked within the top 20 of the Canadian Hot 100.

In terms of certifications, “Rock and a Hard Place” has been certified 8× Platinum by the RIAA in the United States, denoting over eight million units consumed through sales and streams as of 2025, and has earned multi-platinum certifications in other territories, including Diamond in Canada and 2× Platinum in Australia.

== Music video ==
The official music video for “Rock and a Hard Place” was released on June 24, 2022, shortly after the single’s debut. It portrays the emotional unraveling of a romantic relationship, echoing the song’s themes of conflict and heartbreak. In the video, Zimmerman appears as the central figure grappling with his partner’s emotional distance and ultimate decision to move on. Throughout the video, flashbacks of happier moments with his partner are interspersed with scenes of his growing despair, visually reinforcing the song’s metaphor of being caught “between a rock and a hard place.” Ultimately, he decides to give up, accepting the end of their relationship. It has over 108 million views on YouTube as of December 2025.

== Live performances ==
Zimmerman performed “Rock And A Hard Place” live on Good Morning America on December 27, 2022. Later on May 11, Bailey performed "Rock and a Hard Place" at the 58th Academy of Country Music Awards.

== Charts ==
=== Weekly charts ===
Weekly chart performance for "Rock and a Hard Place"
Chart (2022–2023)	Peak position
Australia (ARIA)	41
Canada Hot 100 (Billboard)	17
Canada Country (Billboard)	1
Global 200 (Billboard)	59
New Zealand Hot Singles (RMNZ)	11
US Billboard Hot 100	10
US Country Airplay (Billboard)	1
US Hot Country Songs (Billboard)	2

=== Year-end charts ===
2022 year-end chart performance for "Rock and a Hard Place"
Chart (2022)	Position
Canada (Canadian Hot 100)	67
Global 200 (Billboard)	189
US Billboard Hot 100	70
US Hot Country Songs (Billboard)	17

2023 year-end chart performance for "Rock and a Hard Place"
Chart (2023)	Position
Canada (Canadian Hot 100)	37
Global 200 (Billboard)	154
US Billboard Hot 100	16
US Country Airplay (Billboard)	2
US Hot Country Songs (Billboard)	5

== Certifications ==
Certifications for "Rock and a Hard Place"
Region	Certification	Certified units/sales
Australia (ARIA)	2× Platinum	140,000^{‡}
Canada (Music Canada)	Diamond	800,000^{‡}
New Zealand (RMNZ)	2× Platinum	60,000^{‡}
United Kingdom (BPI)	Silver	200,000^{‡}
United States (RIAA)	8× Platinum	8,000,000^{‡}
^{‡} Sales+streaming figures based on certification alone.

== Release history ==
Release history for "Rock and a Hard Place"
Region	Date	Format	Version	Label
Various	June 10, 2022	Digital download; streaming	Original	Warner Nashville; Elektra
Various	July 15, 2022	Digital download; streaming	Acoustic	Warner Nashville; Elektra
United States	December 12, 2022	Country radio	Original	Warner Nashville; Elektra
