= All the Way (BigXthaPlug song) =

Single by BigXthaPlug featuring Bailey Zimmerman

from the album I Hope You're Happy
- Released: April 4, 2025
- Genre: Hip-hop; country rap
- Length: 2:45
- Label: UnitedMasters
- Songwriters: Xavier Landum; Jenna Johnson; Kelly Katherine Johnson; Krishon Gaines; Ben Johnson; Charles Forsberg III
- Producers: BandPlay; Charley Cooks

BigXthaPlug singles chronology
"Change Me" (2024)	"All the Way" (2025)	"Home" (2025)

Bailey Zimmerman singles chronology
"Holy Smokes" (2024)	"All the Way" (2025)	"Backup Plan" (2025)

Music video
- "All the Way" on YouTube

"All the Way" is a song by American rapper BigXthaPlug featuring American country singer Bailey Zimmerman. It was released on April 4, 2025, through UnitedMasters, as the lead single from BigXthaPlug's third studio album I Hope You're Happy (2025). The song was produced by BandPlay and Charley Cooks. It is featured on the soundtrack for MLB The Show 26.

== Background ==
On February 14, 2025, BigXthaPlug shared a first snippet of the song through his Instagram which was reported to be his first country-leaning single release. The song was confirmed to be part of an upcoming country EP. Zimmerman announced the release date for the song on March 25.

In an interview with Complex, the singer revealed that he was not involved in writing the song but was approached by BigXthaPlug through text messages with a demo version, asking to get him on it. Zimmerman "immediately" agreed and got into the studio to record his vocal take, admitting that it took some time to "get [the song] perfect".

== Composition ==
"All the Way" was described as "a love song about heartbreak" that combines elements of country music and Southern hip-hop, including a steel guitar with deep bass that helps create a "crossover sound". It starts with an acoustic guitar before Zimmerman opens with the chorus which is followed by a verse from BigXthaPlug, talking about "broken promises and lost love". The song was described as a "hard ballad" with a notable "trap-style country groove". It was seen as a first foray into country music for BigXthaPlug and a considerable "step outside his comfort zone".

== Critical reception ==
Zachary Horvath of HotNewHipHop thought that both shared "some chemistry and sound at home" while merging their soundscapes. Trace William Cowen at Complex called it a "blend of BigX and Bailey's strengths" that "sounds right at home amid the current crop of country crossover hits". Vibe's Preezy Brown and Armon Sadler hailed it a "winning effort" and first taste of what to expect from BigXthaPlug's upcoming country-inspired project.

== Music video ==
An accompanying music video was released alongside the song on April 4, 2025, and was filmed in March 2025 at an old country cottage. It features shots of both performing in front of a pickup trucks. The video was said to reflect the song's lyrics about navigating through heartbreak and trouble within a relationship.

== Commercial performance ==
"All the Way" debuted at number four on the US Billboard Hot 100, becoming BigXthaPlug's first and Zimmerman's second top-ten entry on the chart. The single also debuted at number one on Hot Country Songs and Hot Rap Songs. "All the Way" climbed to number one on US Rhythmic Airplay, replacing Justin Bieber’s "Yukon" in the top spot.

== Charts ==
=== Weekly charts ===
Weekly chart performance for "All the Way"
Chart (2025–2026)	Peak position
Canada Hot 100 (Billboard)	21
Global 200 (Billboard)	23
Peru Anglo Airplay (Monitor Latino)	11
US Billboard Hot 100	4
US Hot Country Songs (Billboard)	1
US Pop Airplay (Billboard)	18
US Rhythmic Airplay (Billboard)	2

=== Year-end charts ===
Year-end chart performance for "All the Way"
Chart (2025)	Position
Canada (Canadian Hot 100)	50
Global 200 (Billboard)	169
US Billboard Hot 100	33
US Hot Country Songs (Billboard)	8
US Rhythmic Airplay (Billboard)	17

== Certifications ==
Certifications for "All the Way"
Region	Certification	Certified units/sales
New Zealand (RMNZ)	Gold	15,000^{‡}
United States (RIAA)	2× Platinum	2,000,000^{‡}
^{‡} Sales+streaming figures based on certification alone.
