= Tucker Beathard =

American country musician (born 1995)

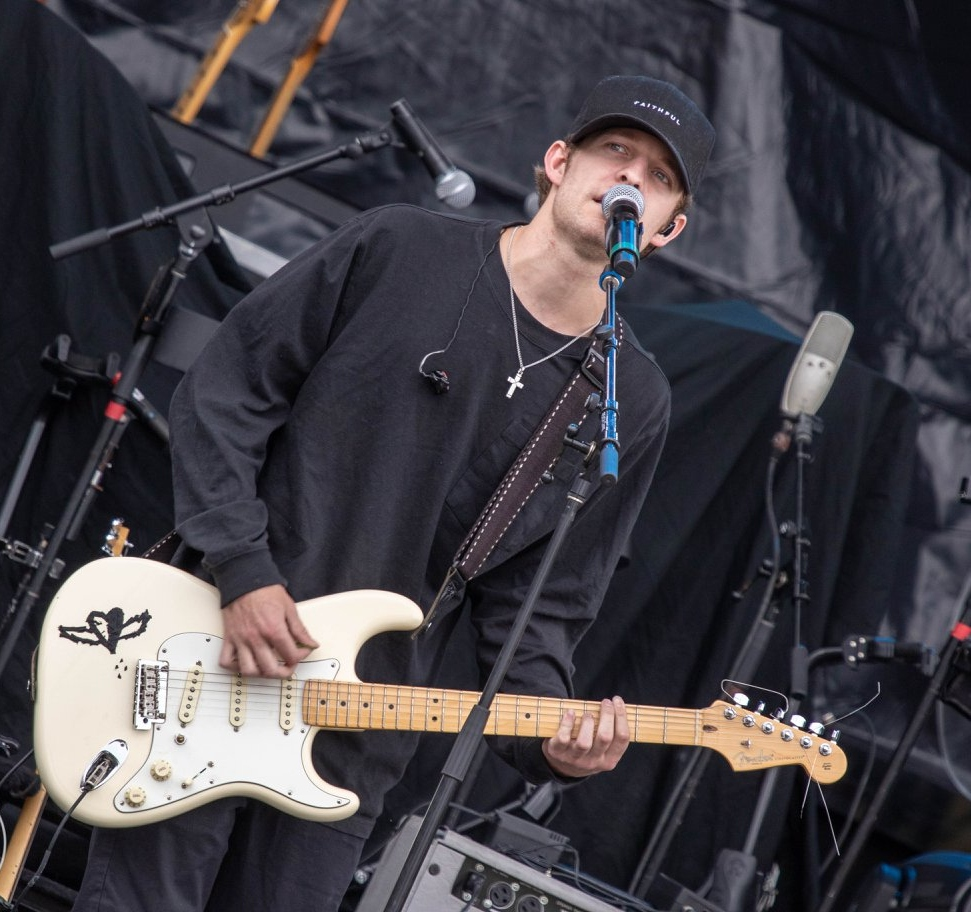
- Beathard performing live in June 2018
- Born: Tucker Russell Beathard; January 24, 1995 (age 31); Franklin, Tennessee, U.S.
- Occupations: Singer; musician; songwriter; producer; composer
- Years active: 2014–present
- Children: 2
- Parent: Casey Beathard (father)
- Relatives: Bobby Beathard (grandfather); C. J. Beathard (brother)
- Musical career
- Genres: Country; country rock; alternative rock; grunge
- Instruments: Vocals; guitar; drums
- Labels: Dot; Warner Nashville

Tucker Russell Beathard (/ˈbɛθərd/ BETH-ərd; born January 24, 1995) is an American country music singer and songwriter. The son of songwriter Casey Beathard, Beathard was signed to Dot Records, a subsidiary of Big Machine Records in 2015 where he released his debut single titled "Rock On" and released an EP titled Fight Like Hell in 2016. Since then, Beathard has departed Big Machine, releasing his debut album titled Nobody's Everything independently on November 30, 2018, and later signed to Warner Music Nashville in early 2019 until his departure from the label in 2024.

== Early life ==
Tucker Beathard was born January 24, 1995, in Nashville, Tennessee. He is the son of country music songwriter, Casey Beathard, brother of Jacksonville Jaguars quarterback C. J. Beathard and grandson of NFL Hall of Famer Bobby Beathard. As a child, he played drums in a band that also included his brothers, but later moved to playing guitar instead. After graduating from Battle Ground Academy in 2014, he intended to play Division I baseball at Middle Tennessee State University. After tearing his shoulder, he chose to focus on music instead.

== Career ==
Having grown up around his father award-winning songwriter Casey Beathard, Beathard spent most of his teenage years playing scattered shows with his father. There are YouTube videos that show Tucker performing originals with his dad as early as June 2013 when they played one of Tucker's earliest songs "Load The Bullets, Cock The Gun.

Heavily considering pursuing a career in the music industry Beathard began playing small shows scattered across the southeastern United States in late 2014. In the second half of 2015 things began heating up for Beathard as he released demos of his recordings to YouTube, the tracks "Ride On", God and My Guitar and most notably "Faithful" sparked attracted fans and eventually allowed him to tour with the likes of Maddie and Tae and Dierks Bentley. On September 18, 2015, it was announced Beathard was signed to Dot Records, a subsidiary of Big Machine Records where he would release an EP titled "The Demos Vol. 1" on October 15, 2015. In January 2016 it was announced Beathard would open for Dierks Bentley throughout his Somewhere on a Beach Tour summer tour. On March 7, 2016, Beathard released his new single titled "Rock On" the song made its way up the charts all summer, eventually peaking at number 2 on the US Country charts. "Rock On" was the lead single to Beathard's six-song EP "Fight Like Hell which was released, October 7, 2016. The EP spawned one more single titled "Momma and Jesus" but failed to be a chart success like "Rock On" was. The EP's title track "Fight Like Hell" gained a cult-like following amongst listeners, leading to multiple fans to start a trend of getting the lyrics "Fight Like Hell" tattooed onto their bodies, leading Beathard to do the same.

It was announced in December 2016 that Beathard would open up for Brantley Gilbert and Luke Combs on Gilbert's 2017 Devil Don't Sleep arena tour.

On November 3, 2017, Beathard announced that his debut album titled "Dear Someone" would be released on November 17, 2017, and would contain thirteen tracks. Beathard released the first track titled "The Boys That Make The Most Noise", via SoundCloud the night of the announcement.

On November 16, 2017, the night before his debut album for Dot Records was supposed to be released Beathard abruptly announced that the album had been postponed citing creative differences with his label Dot Records.

After his debut album was delayed in November 2017, Beathard began leaking demos of his recordings to YouTube so fans could still hear new music from him. The first demo being released in early December 2017 titled "Chasing You With Whiskey", this has since become a fan favorite that he gets many requests for at concerts.

Beathard was released from his contract with Dot Records after a mutual agreement in January 2018.

Over the course of the continuing months, Beathard was in a legal battle to maintain his songs he wrote and recorded while signed to Dot Records, however over the winter, spring and summer of 2018 Beathard leaked multiple demos of tracks to YouTube so fans could keep up where he was going with his debut record. The demo tracks he leaked were titled "Goodbye Amy", "New Me", "I Don't Miss You Now", "Perfect Imperfections", "Same Kinda Different", "This Life", "Ride On", Caught Me On A Good Night", "He Was", "Kiss Me With A Lie", "Hall of Fame", "Nobody's Everything", "New Used Oldsmobile", "She Ain't Right", "Over", "Nobody's Everything", "You Would Think Of Me", "The Closest Thing","Time These Days", "Your Dreams", "It'd Hurt Me More If You Kept Hanging Around", "Smokin' Things" and "Better Than Me".

On November 26, 2018, it was announced via Rolling Stone that Beathard had settled the year-long legal battle with former label Dot Records and announced that he would be releasing his debut album independently; the album titled Nobody's Everything contained nine tracks and was released November 30, 2018. It served as the first part of a two-part album, with part two containing nine more tracks intended to be released in 2019. Beathard got the name Nobody's Everything from one of the demos he wrote and leaked to YouTube during the summer of 2018.

Nobody's Everything spawned the single "Ride On", which resulted in Beathard's 2019 Ride On Tour.

On January 15, 2019, it was announced that Beathard had signed to Warner Music Nashville and would release part two of his debut album through their label.

On February 22, 2019, the day Beathard's ride on tour kicked off at Coyote Joes in Charlotte, North Carolina Beathard released the first single to part two of his debut album, the single titled "Better Than Me" was released for purchase on February 22, and released to radio May 6, 2019. The second single to part 2 of Beathard's debut album titled "Find Me Here" was released digitally to purchase June 3, 2019.

In September 2019 Beathard announced he would be headlining the Monster Energy Outbreak Tour in the fall of 2019, wrapping up this year with a tour to support before his new album comes out.

Beathard released his next single "You Would Think" on February 21, 2020. The song is allegedly the lead radio single for part 2 of his debut album which is expected later this year.

On February 22, 2020, while performing at the Grand Ole Opry, Beathard debuted a new song titled "I Ain't Without You", about his late brother who had died in December 2019.

On August 21, 2020, Beathard released his second studio album King, which included previously released singles "Better Than Me", "Find Me Here", "Can't Stay Here", and "You Would Think". This album was the second half to the double album concept that Beathard talked about doing after releasing his first studio album, Nobody's Everything.

Beathard released the single titled "Prayin' for You" on December 10, 2021.

In late October 2022 it was announced Beathard would release his new single "One Of Those" on November 4, 2022.

In early 2023 Tucker teased multiple new songs via his official social media pages, sharing acoustic and demo versions of new songs titled "Good One to End On", "I Owe You One" and "Good News". On February 4, 2023, Tucker Beathard announced he will be releasing his next new single "Who I Am With You" on February 10, 2023, a song Beathard previously announced and shared a stripped-down acoustic version of on January 19, 2021, via his official Instagram and Facebook pages.

== Personal life ==
In December 2019, a few days before Christmas Beathard's younger brother Clay Beathard was stabbed and killed alongside his friend Paul Trapeni outside of a bar in Nashville while protecting a girl who was being assaulted by the assailant Michael Mosley. At Clay's funeral, Beathard alongside his brother, C. J. Beathard, and parents gave their eulogies which was streamed live on local news stations and via social media.

On July 13, 2020, Beathard revealed to fans that he had become a father via his social media pages. His daughter, named "Sage" was born in July 2018.

== Discography ==
=== Albums ===
Title	Details
Nobody's Everything	Release date: November 30, 2018; Label: Mother Tucker, Warner Nashville
King	Release date: August 21, 2020; Label: Mother Tucker, Warner Nashville

=== Extended plays ===
Title	Details	Peak chart positions		Sales
Title	Details	US Country	US	Sales
The Demos Vol. 1	Release date: October 16, 2015; Label: Dot	—	—	
Fight Like Hell	Release date: October 7, 2016; Label: Dot	14	177	3,900

=== Singles ===
Year	Single	Peak chart positions				Sales	Album/EP
Year	Single	US Country	US Country Airplay	US	CAN Country	Sales	Album/EP
2016	"Rock On"	9	2	62	16	US: 216,000	Fight Like Hell
2016	"Momma and Jesus"	—	43	—	—		Fight Like Hell
2019	"Better Than Me"	—	—	—	—		King
2020	"You Would Think"	—	—	—	—		King

=== Music videos ===
Year	Video	Director
2016	"Rock On"	Good One (Ry Cox/Drew Cox)
2017	"Momma and Jesus"	Wes Edwards
2017	"Chasing You With Whiskey"	Tucker Beathard
2018	"Leave Me Alone"	Jordan Rigby
2018	"This Life"	Jordan Rigby
2019	"Somethin' To Say"	Jordan Rigby
2019	"Better Than Me"	Jordan Rigby
2019	"Find Me Here"	Jordan Rigby
