= Bailey Zimmerman =

American country singer (born 2000)

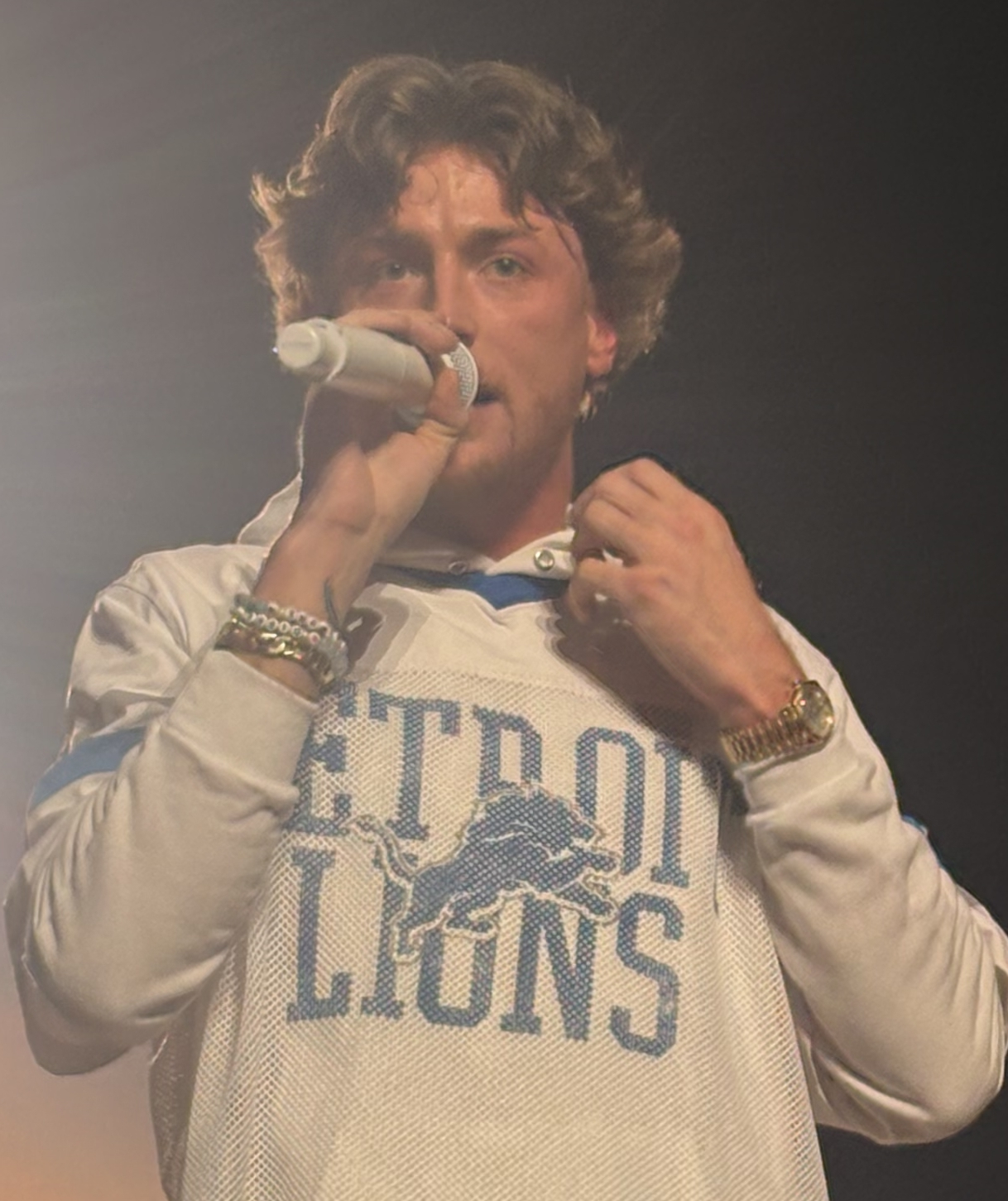
- Zimmerman performing in 2026

Background information
- Born: Bailey Lynn Zimmerman; January 27, 2000 (age 26); Louisville, Illinois, U.S.
- Genres: Country; country rock; Southern rock
- Occupations: Singer; songwriter
- Instruments: Vocals; guitar
- Years active: 2020–present
- Labels: Warner Nashville; Elektra
- Website: baileyzimmermanofficial.com

Bailey Lynn Zimmerman (born January 27, 2000) is an American country singer. His debut album, Religiously. The Album., was released on May 12, 2023, and spawned four singles: "Fall in Love", "Rock and a Hard Place", "Religiously", and "Where It Ends", all reached number one on the Billboard Country Airplay chart. Zimmerman followed this in 2025 with his second album Different Night Same Rodeo, which included "Backup Plan" with Luke Combs, which became his fifth number one on the Canada Country chart.

Zimmerman is known for his raspy vocals, energetic stage presence, and fusion of country and rock sounds in his music.

== Early life ==
Bailey Lynn Zimmerman was born January 27, 2000, in Louisville, Illinois. He began playing the guitar at the age of nine, devoting much of his childhood to riding dirt bikes and playing baseball. His mother first introduced him to various hair metal bands as well as Kid Rock, Avenged Sevenfold, and Nickelback when he was a teenager. In 2012, his mother took him to his first concert, which was performed by Tesla. It was the only other concert he had attended before he became a singer. In comparison, his father would take long trips with Zimmerman playing country music on the radio.

Prior to making music, he worked in the meat-packing industry in 2016. Shortly after graduating, he relocated to West Virginia to work on a union gas pipeline. He graduated from North Clay High School on May 12, 2018. Due to a lack of time spent with his family, he quit pipelining to pursue a truck lift venture with his stepbrother's welding business Top Notch Metal Worx. He started promoting the business through his TikTok account to acquire customers.

== Career ==
=== Early career (2020–2021) ===
While awaiting the completion of a customer's build at his stepbrother's establishment, Zimmerman recorded himself singing "Stay" by Black Stone Cherry for Snapchat to "impress girls". Songwriter Gavin Lucas, whose father had been Zimmerman's school bus driver in elementary school, came across Zimmerman's story and was taken aback by his singing ability. Lucas informed Zimmerman that the video had been widely shared, and he expressed interest in hearing some of Zimmerman's own songs. Several weeks later, while at his uncle's body shop, Lucas approached Zimmerman with a request to collaborate on a song. In response, Zimmerman penned the first verse of "Never Comin' Home." Subsequently, they captured a video of Zimmerman performing the song with Lucas accompanying on guitar.

In December 2020, Zimmerman started sharing original music on his TikTok account, notably featuring "Never Comin' Home." Within a mere five hours, a snippet of the song had garnered over a million views. Motivated by this rapid success, he secured a studio in Nashville to professionally record the track, investing $3,000. He made the decision to resign from his job shortly after. With finances tight, he turned to his mother, requesting $1,500. He conveyed to her the escalating traction of his song and his aspirations to pursue a career as a country singer.

On February 3, 2021, he released his debut single "Never Comin' Home", which later entered the top 20 on Spotify's Viral Chart in the United States. The co-manager at 10th Street Entertainment, Scott Frazier, came across Zimmerman on TikTok and subsequently introduced him to Core Entertainment principals Kevin Zaruk and Simon Tikhman. He later signed to Core Entertainment in August 2021. The same month, he performed his first show at "Rock The South 2021" with a backing band he only met three days prior to the performance.

=== Religiously. The Album. (2022–2024) ===
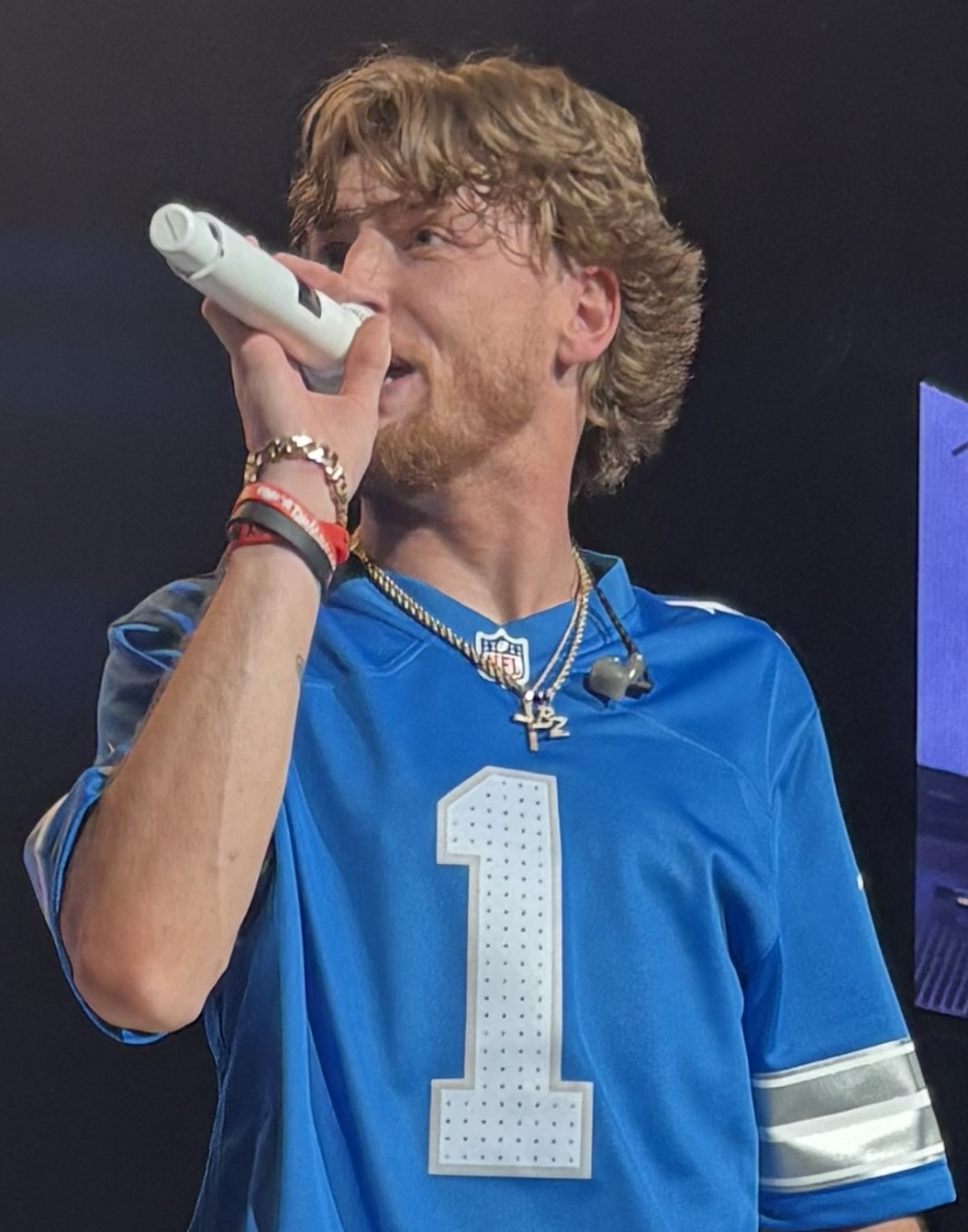
Zimmerman at Ford Feild

His breakout single "Fall in Love" was released on February 11, 2022, and reached number 29 on the Billboard Hot 100 in October. This was followed by additional singles "Rock and a Hard Place" and "Where It Ends" in June and August 2022, respectively. Due to the success of these songs, Zimmerman was signed to Warner Music Nashville and Elektra Records, with "Fall in Love" later charting at Country radio format.

Zimmerman released his debut major-label project Leave the Light On on October 14, 2022. It debuted in the top ten of the Billboard 200 and Canadian Albums charts. As a result of high demand, Zimmerman extended his headlining tour of the United States into the fall of 2022, with Josh Ross opening his early 2023 dates. He made his Grand Ole Opry debut on November 4, 2022. Morgan Wallen announced that Zimmerman would be one of the opening acts for his One Night at a Time World Tour in 2023.

On March 17, 2023, Zimmerman announced his debut album Religiously. The Album., and it was released on May 12, 2023. He supported the album with the "Religiously: The Tour" across the United States, Great Britain, and Ireland in 2024, with Josh Ross again joining him as an opening act. “Rock And A Hard Place” broke the record for the longest climb to the top 10 for a song by a soloist in Billboard Hot 100 history.

=== Different Night Same Rodeo (2024–present) ===
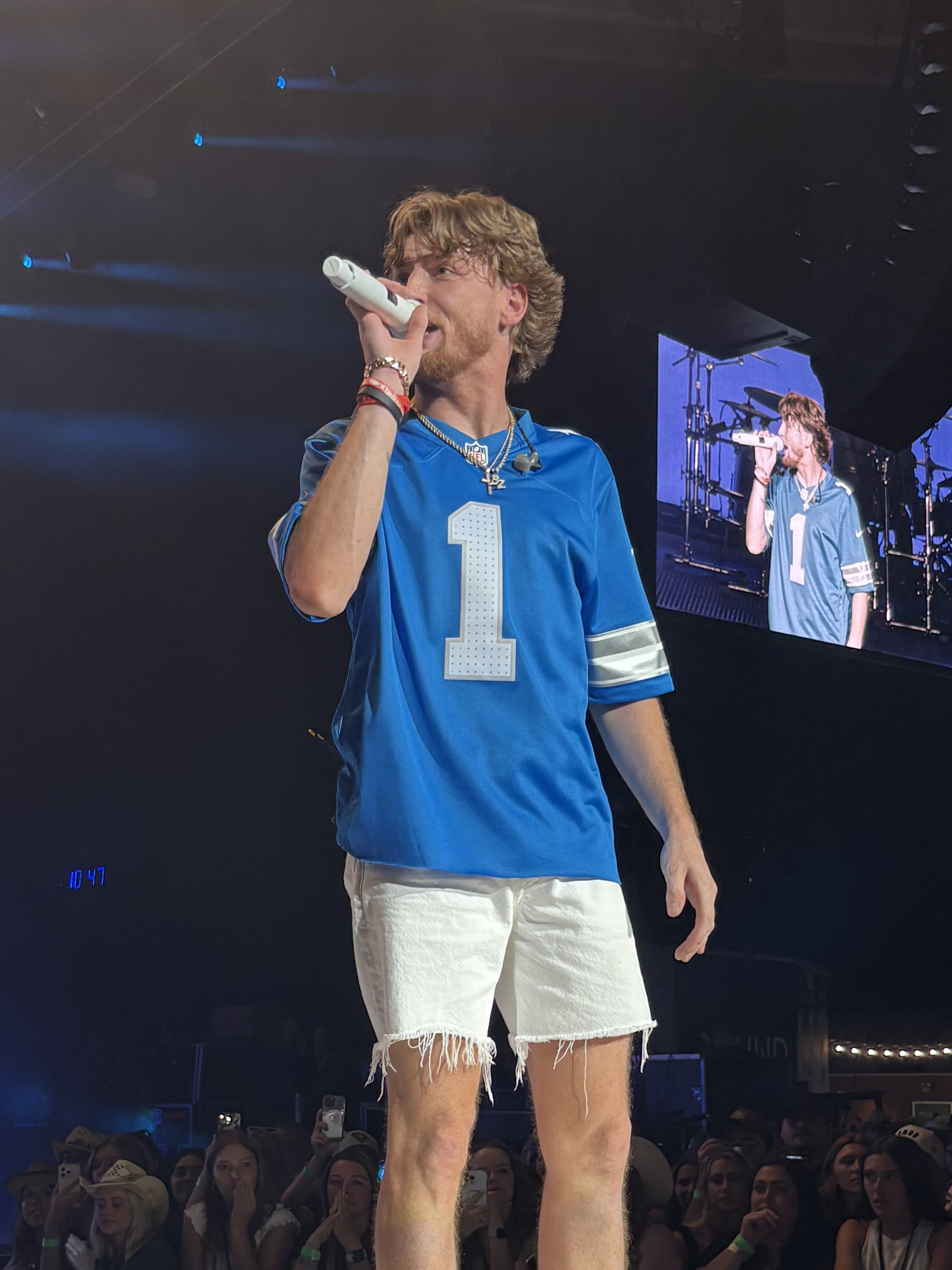
Zimmerman

On February 23, 2024, Zimmerman released "Holy Smokes" as the lead single for his second album which was previously teased through TikTok. It debuted and peaked at No. 54. Zimmerman would be featured on the soundtrack for 2024 film Twisters with his song "Hell or High Water." On June 17, 2024, Zimmerman created anticipation for his new track "New to Country" by teasing it on social media platforms, following its use as pre-concert hype music. On October 18, 2024, he released "Holding On", as another single from his sophomore record Different Night Same Rodeo. In January 2025, Zimmerman announced his "New To Country Tour," a 16-show summer tour across U.S. amphitheaters with Dylan Marlowe and Drew Baldridge joining him as openers.

On February 14, 2025, BigXthaPlug shared a snippet of his country rap collaboration "All the Way" with Zimmerman through his Instagram. Zimmerman announced the release date for the song on March 25. It debuted at No. 4 on the Billboard Hot 100, giving BigXthaPlug his first top 10 hit and Zimmerman his second and highest peaking single to date. On April 21, he announced a duet with Luke Combs called "Backup Plan." They debuted the song live at the 2025 Stagecoach Festival, where they also filmed the music video. It debuted at No. 36, peaked at No. 30, and became his fifth number one on country radio. He announced his second album Different Night Same Rodeo on July 8, 2025, via social media and during a live performance at Spotify House during CMA Fest in Nashville. Zimmerman continued to tease the release by dropping promotional singles "Comin' in Cold", "Ashes" with Diplo, and "Chevy Silverado" in anticipation. Different Night Same Rodeo debuted at No. 12 on the Billboard 200 and No. 3 on Hot Country Albums with 31,000 units sold.

He announced his first-ever arena tour, the Different Night Same Rodeo Tour, in support of the album for 2026 with legs in North America and Europe. The leg in Europe would be cancelled due to "important family matters." "Chevy Silverado" would be chosen as the third single for the album on October 13, 2025, eventually becoming his 6th number one on country radio and peaking at No. 41 on the Hot 100. Zimmerman collaborated with American contemporary Christian musician Brandon Lake for "Just Believe" on March 13, 2026. He also released a cover of Miley Cyrus’s "The Climb" on May 22, 2026, as a standalone single following its viral success during his Different Night Same Rodeo Tour.

== Artistry ==
Zimmerman is noted for having a raspy, gritty voice with influences stemming from Nickelback, Tesla, and Eric Church. His sound is a mix of rock and country.

== Personal life ==
Zimmerman is Christian. His parents divorced when he was ten years old. He has an older brother Dalton, and younger brother Nicholas. Zimmerman has been a lifelong fan of WWE, expressing that he had dreamed of attending an event since childhood but could not afford it growing up. He had previously invited Big Show to carry him on his shoulders during his performance at the 58th Annual Country Music Association Awards.

On February 11, 2023, Zimmerman performed at BetMGM's West Super Bowl Fest held at the Westgate Entertainment District in Glendale, Arizona. However, during his performance of "Rock and a Hard Place", technical difficulties resulted in him losing audio feedback, leading to an unintentional off-key performance. This incident garnered significant attention, with a TikTok video capturing the moment amassing over eleven million views. Consequently, Zimmerman faced accusations of being unable to sing. Responding to the ensuing backlash on February 15, Zimmerman acknowledged the incident and issued a public apology.

On January 18, 2025, Zimmerman's performance at the Crash My Playa festival in Cancún sparked concern among fans after he appeared to struggle on stage, leading to noticeable issues in his singing and stage presence. Addressing the incident, Zimmerman admitted to being too intoxicated to perform properly and expressed deep regret for disappointing his fans.

=== Legal issues ===
Zimmerman faced a felony charge for criminal damage to property and a misdemeanor for falsely obtaining services following the destruction of an Albuquerque hotel room. The incident occurred on May 27, 2026, leading local authorities to issue an arrest warrant. Investigators stated he caused over $16,000 in damages to a Sandia Resort and Casino suite following a canceled concert over a supposed illness. He would issue a public apology statement on June 23, 2026. All criminal charges were dropped by Bernalillo County prosecutors after he made full financial restitution.

== Philanthropy ==
In 2025, Zimmerman participated in St. Jude Children's Research Hospital Music Gives to St. Jude Kids fundraising campaign, appearing in promotional materials for the charity’s annual shirt initiative. He also partnered with Raising Cane's in Nashville to donate 100 bicycles and helmets to children from the Boys & Girls Clubs of Middle Tennessee.

== Discography ==
Studio albums

- Religiously. The Album. (2023)
- Different Night Same Rodeo (2025)

== Awards and nominations ==
Year	Award show	Category	Nominated work	Result	Ref
2023	CMT Music Awards	Male Breakthrough Video of the Year	"Fall in Love"	Nominated	
2023	CMT Music Awards	Male Video of the Year	"Rock and a Hard Place"	Nominated	
2023	Academy of Country Music Awards	New Male Artist of the Year	Bailey Zimmerman	Nominated	
2024	CMT Music Awards	Male Video of the Year	"Religiously"	Nominated	
2024	Country Music Association Awards	New Artist of the Year	Bailey Zimmerman	Nominated	
2026	American Music Awards	Collaboration of the Year	"All the Way" (as a featured artist)	Pending	
2026	American Music Awards	Best Country Song	"All the Way" (as a featured artist)	Pending	

== Tours ==
=== Headlining ===
- Bailey Zimmerman On Tour (2022–23)
- Religiously. The Tour. (2024)
- "New to Country" Summer Tour (2025)
- Different Night Same Rodeo Tour (2026)

=== Opening ===
- One Night at a Time (2023–24) (with Morgan Wallen)
- In the Air Tour (2024) (with Kane Brown)
- Mind of a Country Boy Tour (2024) (with Luke Bryan)
