= List of concerts at TD Garden =

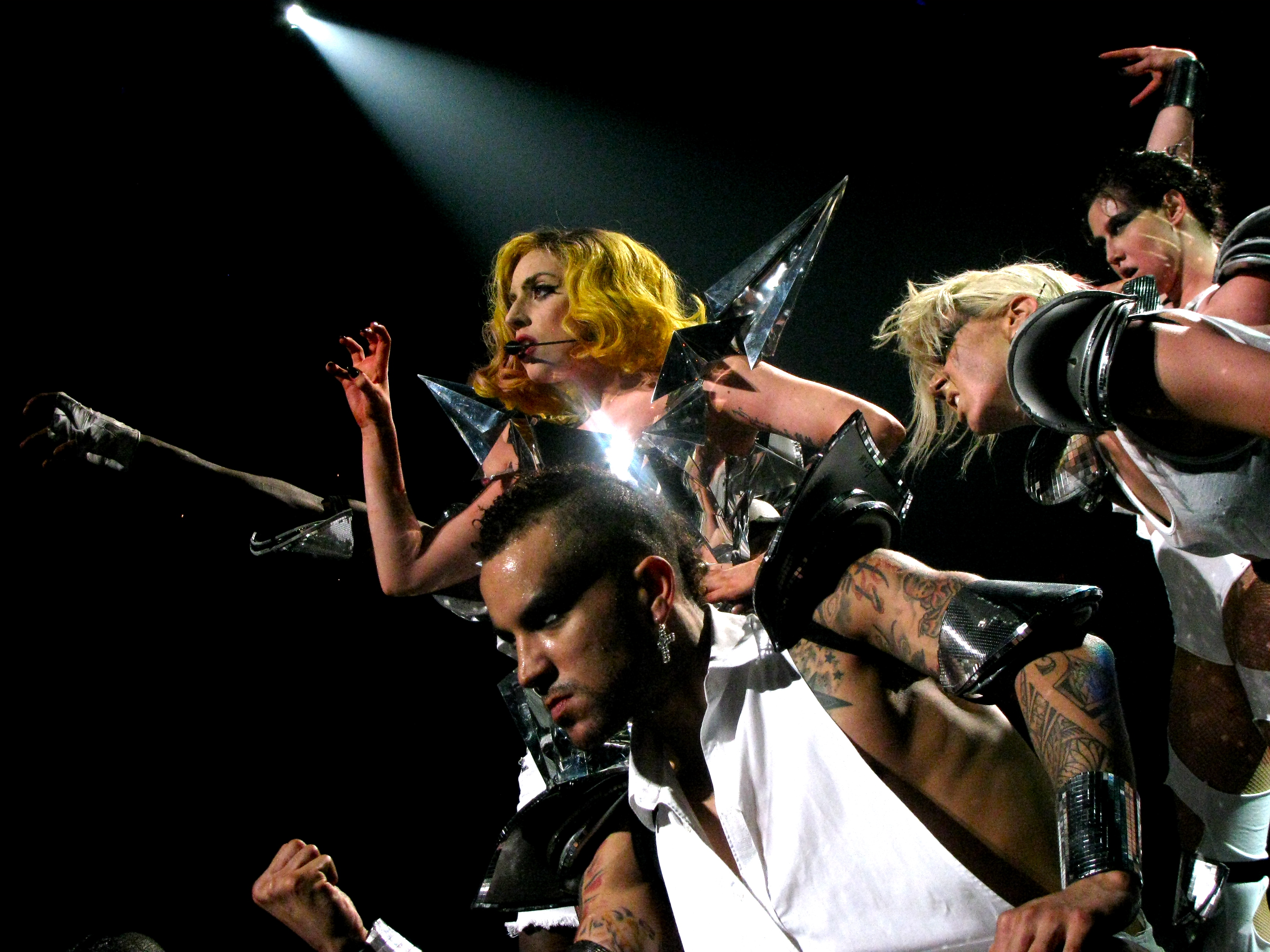
Lady Gaga performing at TD Garden as part of The Monster Ball Tour, July 1, 2010

Since its opening in 1995, the TD Garden in Boston, Massachusetts, has hosted many local, regional and international artists, spanning a wide range of musical genres. A list of notable concerts are given in the table below. All events are arranged in a chronological order.

== 1990s ==
=== 1995 ===
Concerts at FleetCenter
Date(s)	Headliner(s)	Supporting act(s)	Event / Tour	Attendance	Revenue
October 3	R.E.M.	Grant Lee Buffalo	Monster Tour	—N/a	—N/a
October 23	Page and Plant	—N/a	No Quarter Tour	—N/a	—N/a

=== 1996 ===
Concerts at FleetCenter
Date(s)	Headliner(s)	Supporting act(s)	Event / Tour	Attendance	Revenue
February 8	Red Hot Chili Peppers	Silverchair	One Hot Minute Tour	—N/a	—N/a
February 29	Bob Seger; Silver Bullet Band	John Hiatt	It's a Mystery Tour	18,203 / 18,203	$521,005
March 5	Rod Stewart	—N/a	A Spanner in the Works Tour	—N/a	—N/a
March 19	AC/DC	—N/a	Ballbreaker World Tour	15,033 / 15,033	$428,441
June 18	Neil Diamond	—N/a	World Tour 1996	—N/a	—N/a
June 20	Neil Diamond	—N/a	World Tour 1996	—N/a	—N/a
June 21	Neil Diamond	—N/a	World Tour 1996	—N/a	—N/a
June 22	Neil Diamond	—N/a	World Tour 1996	—N/a	—N/a
July 30	Kiss	The Nixons	Alive/Worldwide Tour	31,664 / 31,664	$1,257,175
July 31	Kiss	D Generation	Alive/Worldwide Tour	31,664 / 31,664	$1,257,175
August 20	Melissa Etheridge	—N/a	Your Little Secret Tour	—N/a	—N/a
October 1	Dave Matthews Band	Soul Coughing	1996 Fall Tour	—N/a	—N/a
October 2	Dave Matthews Band	Soul Coughing	1996 Fall Tour	—N/a	—N/a
November 5	The Smashing Pumpkins	Garbage	Infinite Sadness Tour; Garbage tour	—N/a	—N/a
November 9	Rush	—N/a	Test for Echo Tour	—N/a	—N/a
November 30	Stone Temple Pilots	Local H	Tiny Music... Songs from the Vatican Gift Shop Tour	—N/a	—N/a

=== 1997 ===
Concerts at FleetCenter
Date(s)	Headliner(s)	Supporting act(s)	Event / Tour	Attendance	Revenue
February 7	Toni Braxton	Kenny G	Secrets Tour	13,900 / 13,900	$448,324
March 4	Metallica	Corrosion of Conformity	Poor Touring Me	33,279 / 35,360	$1,085,467
March 5	Metallica	Corrosion of Conformity	Poor Touring Me	33,279 / 35,360	$1,085,467
March 24	Phil Collins	—N/a	The Trip into the Light World Tour	17,215 / 19,688	$635,861
April 7	Celine Dion	Soul Attorneys; Mike and the Mechanics; Human Nature	Falling Into You Around the World Tour	15,508 / 15,508	$445,000
April 12	Bush	Veruca Salt	Razorblade Suitcase Tour	—N/a	—N/a
April 17	Garth Brooks	—N/a	1996–98 World Tour	35,183 / 35,183	$591,719
April 18	Garth Brooks	—N/a	1996–98 World Tour	35,183 / 35,183	$591,719
July 25	Prince	—N/a	Jam of the Year Tour	11,761 / 15,705	$627,253
October 1	Luther Vandross; Vanessa Williams	—N/a	Your Secret Love Tour	—N/a	—N/a
December 30	Aerosmith	Days of the New	Nine Lives Tour	—N/a	—N/a
December 31	Aerosmith	Days of the New	Nine Lives Tour	—N/a	—N/a

=== 1998 ===
Concerts at FleetCenter
Date(s)	Headliner(s)	Supporting act(s)	Event / Tour	Attendance	Revenue
January 23	Bob Dylan	Van Morrison	Never Ending Tour 1998	28,800 / 28,800	$1,454,860
January 24	Bob Dylan	Van Morrison	Never Ending Tour 1998	28,800 / 28,800	$1,454,860
March 20	Puff Daddy	—N/a	1998 U.S. Tour	—N/a	—N/a
April 14	Eric Clapton	Distant Cousins	Pilgrim Tour	14,994 / 14,994	$863,255
May 15	Elton John	—N/a	Big Picture Tour	35,642 / 35,642	$1,563,121
May 16	Elton John	—N/a	Big Picture Tour	35,642 / 35,642	$1,563,121
May 21	Van Halen	Kenny Wayne Shepherd	III Tour	12,073 / 15,000	$363,730
July 13	Page and Plant	—N/a	Walking Into Everywhere Tour	—N/a	—N/a
August 1	Tori Amos	—N/a	Plugged Tour	—N/a	—N/a
August 21	Celine Dion	André-Philippe Gagnon	Let's Talk About Love World Tour	35,342 / 35,342	$1,950,481
August 22	Celine Dion	André-Philippe Gagnon	Let's Talk About Love World Tour	35,342 / 35,342	$1,950,481
September 18	Janet Jackson	NSYNC; Usher	The Velvet Rope Tour	—N/a	—N/a
October 5	Barenaked Ladies	—N/a	Stunt Tour	—N/a	—N/a
November 12	Kiss	Econoline Crush	Psycho Circus World Tour	—N/a	—N/a
November 13	Kiss	Econoline Crush	Psycho Circus World Tour	—N/a	—N/a
December 31	Aerosmith	Candlebox	Nine Lives Tour	—N/a	—N/a

=== 1999 ===
Concerts at FleetCenter
Date(s)	Headliner(s)	Supporting act(s)	Event / Tour	Attendance	Revenue
February 3	Black Sabbath	Pantera; Deftones	Black Sabbath Reunion Tour	17,375 / 17,375	$718,602
February 22	Alanis Morissette	Garbage	Junkie Tour; Version 2.0 World Tour	—N/a	—N/a
February 28	Jimmy Buffett; Coral Reefer Band	—N/a	Don't Stop the Carnival Tour	—N/a	—N/a
March 22	The Rolling Stones	Goo Goo Dolls	No Security Tour	35,049 / 35,049	$4,403,159
March 23	The Rolling Stones	Goo Goo Dolls	No Security Tour	35,049 / 35,049	$4,403,159
March 27	Jay-Z; DMX; Method Man; Redman	—N/a	Hard Knock Life Tour	—N/a	—N/a
June 14	Shania Twain	Leahy	Come On Over Tour	17,543 / 17,543	$770,818
June 17	Ani DiFranco	Maceo Parker	Summer Tour 1999	—N/a	—N/a
August 21	Bruce Springsteen; E Street Band	—N/a	Bruce Springsteen and the E Street Band Reunion Tour	98,894 / 98,894	$5,469,060
August 22	Bruce Springsteen; E Street Band	—N/a	Bruce Springsteen and the E Street Band Reunion Tour	98,894 / 98,894	$5,469,060
August 24	Bruce Springsteen; E Street Band	—N/a	Bruce Springsteen and the E Street Band Reunion Tour	98,894 / 98,894	$5,469,060
August 26	Bruce Springsteen; E Street Band	—N/a	Bruce Springsteen and the E Street Band Reunion Tour	98,894 / 98,894	$5,469,060
August 27	Bruce Springsteen; E Street Band	—N/a	Bruce Springsteen and the E Street Band Reunion Tour	98,894 / 98,894	$5,469,060
September 21	Backstreet Boys	E.Y.C.	Into the Millennium Tour	34,489 / 34,489	$1,265,558
September 22	Backstreet Boys	E.Y.C.	Into the Millennium Tour	34,489 / 34,489	$1,265,558
September 24	Celine Dion	Corey Hart	Let's Talk About Love World Tour	18,845 / 18,845	$1,130,203
October 8	Bette Midler	—N/a	The Divine Miss Millennium	14,108 / 14,108	$997,009
October 12	Elton John	—N/a	An Evening with Elton John	—N/a	—N/a

== 2000s ==
2000

Concerts at FleetCenter
Date(s)	Headliner(s)	Supporting act(s)	Event / Tour	Attendance	Revenue	Ref(s)
March 3	Cher	Lou Bega; CNOTE	Do You Believe?	14,589 / 14,589	$908,183	
March 26	Crosby, Stills, Nash & Young	—N/a	CSNY2K Tour	30,320 / 30,320	$2,452,586	
March 27	Crosby, Stills, Nash & Young	—N/a	CSNY2K Tour	30,320 / 30,320	$2,452,586	
April 13 (Note: Mariah Carey's Rainbow World Tour was initially scheduled for April 4, 2000, but was postponed to April 13 in order to allow Carey to recover from food poisoning.)	Mariah Carey	—N/a	Rainbow World Tour	—N/a	—N/a	
June 8	Tina Turner	Lionel Richie	Twenty Four Seven Tour	27,926 / 27,926	$1,926,240	
June 9	Tina Turner	Lionel Richie	Twenty Four Seven Tour	27,926 / 27,926	$1,926,240	
June 21	Ricky Martin	—N/a	Livin' la Vida Loca Tour	—N/a	—N/a	
June 22	Ricky Martin	3 Doors Down	Livin' la Vida Loca Tour	—N/a	—N/a	
August 8	AC/DC	Slash's Snakepit	Stiff Upper Lip World Tour	—N/a	—N/a	
September 20	Tina Turner	Joe Cocker	Twenty Four Seven Tour	—N/a	—N/a	
November 8	Bon Jovi	Less Than Jake	Crush Tour	15,094 / 15,094	$635,101	
December 11	Dave Matthews Band	funky METERS	2000 Fall Tour	19,211 / 19,211	$871,963	
December 31	Barenaked Ladies	—N/a	Maroon Tour	30,025 / 32,108 (Note: The score data for the Barenaked Ladies' Maroon Tour is combined from the shows on December 31, 2000 and January 1, 2001.)	$1,146,174	

2001

Concerts at FleetCenter
Date(s)	Headliner(s)	Supporting act(s)	Event / Tour	Attendance	Revenue	Ref(s)
January 1	Barenaked Ladies	Guster	Maroon Tour	30,025 / 32,108	$1,146,174	
March 27	Sarah Brightman	—N/a	La Luna World Tour	6,791 / 7,000	$402,534	
April 1	Andrea Bocelli	Hartford Symphony Orchestra; Cecilia Gasdia	Andrea Bocelli Live in Boston	14,724 / 14,724	$2,129,935	
May 4	AC/DC	Buckcherry	Stiff Upper Lip World Tour	—N/a	—N/a	
May 26	Sting	Jill Scott	Brand New Day Tour; Words and Sounds Tour	13,864 / 13,864	$842,430	
June 5	U2	PJ Harvey	Elevation Tour	68,139 / 68,139	$5,620,260	
June 6	U2	PJ Harvey	Elevation Tour	68,139 / 68,139	$5,620,260	
June 8	U2	PJ Harvey	Elevation Tour	68,139 / 68,139	$5,620,260	
June 9	U2	PJ Harvey	Elevation Tour	68,139 / 68,139	$5,620,260	
June 11	Eric Clapton	Doyle Bramhall II and Smokestack	Reptile World Tour	29,794 / 29,794	$1,894,300	
June 12	Eric Clapton	Doyle Bramhall II and Smokestack	Reptile World Tour	29,794 / 29,794	$1,894,300	
July 6	Backstreet Boys	Sisqó	Black & Blue Tour	20,710 / 21,133	$1,540,120	
July 7	Backstreet Boys	Sisqó	Black & Blue Tour	20,710 / 21,133	$1,540,120	
August 7 (Note: The first show of Madonna's Drowned World Tour was initially scheduled for August 6, 2001, but was rescheduled for the following day in order to allow more time for Madonna to rest her voice.)	Madonna	—N/a	Drowned World Tour	29,688 / 29,688	$3,503,520	
August 8	Madonna	—N/a	Drowned World Tour	29,688 / 29,688	$3,503,520	
August 22	Sade	India.Arie	Lovers Rock Tour	—N/a	—N/a	
August 25	Janet Jackson	112	All for You Tour	26,892 / 26,892	$1,884,176	
August 26	Janet Jackson	112	All for You Tour	26,892 / 26,892	$1,884,176	
September 8 (Note: The last three shows for Backstreet Boys' Black & Blue Tour were initially scheduled for July 8, 9 and 10, 2001, following the first two shows. These shows were postponed to September 8, 9 and 10 in order to allow member AJ McLean to undergo treatment for clinical depression.)	Backstreet Boys	Sisqó	Black & Blue Tour	31,035 / 34,871	$2,461,278	
September 9	Backstreet Boys	Sisqó	Black & Blue Tour	31,035 / 34,871	$2,461,278	
September 10	Backstreet Boys	Sisqó	Black & Blue Tour	31,035 / 34,871	$2,461,278	
October 2	Neil Diamond	—N/a	World Tour 2001–2002	31,482 / 31,482	$1,948,170	
October 3	Neil Diamond	—N/a	World Tour 2001–2002	31,482 / 31,482	$1,948,170	
October 26	Rod Stewart	—N/a	Human Tour	—N/a	—N/a	
November 24	Bob Dylan	—N/a	Never Ending Tour	—N/a	—N/a	
November 25	Luciano Pavarotti	—N/a	Luciano Pavarotti Live in Boston	11,470 / 13,200	$1,227,100	
December 9	Britney Spears	O-Town	Dream Within a Dream Tour	16,421 / 16,421	$947,959	
December 11	Britney Spears	LFO	Dream Within a Dream Tour	14,437 / 16,421	$876,588	

2002

Concerts at FleetCenter
Date(s)	Headliner(s)	Supporting act(s)	Event / Tour	Attendance	Revenue	Ref(s)
January 22	Elton John; Billy Joel	—N/a	Face to Face 2002	68,155 / 71,564	$7,236,695	
January 24	Elton John; Billy Joel	—N/a	Face to Face 2002	68,155 / 71,564	$7,236,695	
January 29	Elton John; Billy Joel	—N/a	Face to Face 2002	68,155 / 71,564	$7,236,695	
January 31	Elton John; Billy Joel	—N/a	Face to Face 2002	68,155 / 71,564	$7,236,695	
February 7	Creed	Tantric; Virgos	Weathered Tour	—N/a	—N/a	
March 2	Crosby, Stills, Nash & Young	—N/a	Tour of America	28,612 / 28,612	$2,358,017	
March 3	Crosby, Stills, Nash & Young	—N/a	Tour of America	28,612 / 28,612	$2,358,017	
April 7	Dave Matthews Band	Yerba Buena	2002 Spring Tour	34,430 / 34,430	$1,600,995	
April 8	Dave Matthews Band	Yerba Buena	2002 Spring Tour	34,430 / 34,430	$1,600,995	
April 15	NSYNC	P. Diddy; Tony Lucca	Celebrity Tour	33,473 / 35,357	$2,097,028	
April 16	NSYNC	P. Diddy; Tony Lucca	Celebrity Tour	33,473 / 35,357	$2,097,028	
April 19	Paul McCartney	—N/a	Driving USA Tour	14,607 / 14,607	$1,952,755	
June 29	Britney Spears	LMNT	Dream Within a Dream Tour	15,396 / 15,396	$907,274	
July 8	Cher	Cyndi Lauper	Living Proof: The Farewell Tour	27,232 / 28,750	$1,847,262	
July 9	Cher	Cyndi Lauper	Living Proof: The Farewell Tour	27,232 / 28,750	$1,847,262	
August 16	Tool	Tomahawk	Inside the Outside Tour	13,937 / 17,888	$558,231	
September 3	The Rolling Stones	The Pretenders	Licks Tour	14,608 / 14,608	$2,736,377	
September 20	Elton John; Billy Joel	—N/a	Face to Face 2002	17,483 / 17,483	$1,835,530	
September 30	Paul McCartney	—N/a	Back in the U.S. Tour	29,097 / 29,097	$4,050,530	
October 1	Paul McCartney	—N/a	Back in the U.S. Tour	29,097 / 29,097	$4,050,530	
October 4	Bruce Springsteen; E Street Band	—N/a	The Rising Tour	19,658 / 19,658	$1,400,300	
October 7	Sheryl Crow; Don Henley; Billy Joel; John Mellencamp; Sting; James Taylor; Roger Waters		Music to My Ears: A Tribute to Timothy White	13,601 / 13,601	$1,492,800	
October 28	Rush	—N/a	Vapor Trails Tour	—N/a	—N/a	
November 3	Cher	—N/a	Living Proof: The Farewell Tour	—N/a	—N/a	
November 16	Bob Dylan	—N/a	Never Ending Tour	8,078 / 13,000	$344,436	
November 30	Shakira	Pay the Girl	Tour of the Mongoose	12,555 / 12,555	$678,540	
December 2	Guns N' Roses	CKY; Mix Master Mike	Chinese Democracy Tour	12,700 / 12,700	—N/a	
December 14	Tom Petty and the Heartbreakers	Jackson Browne	The Last DJ Tour	13,788 / 13,788	$665,798	

2003

Concerts at FleetCenter
Date(s)	Headliner(s)	Supporting act(s)	Event / Tour	Attendance	Revenue	Ref(s)
January 12	The Rolling Stones	Ryan Adams	Licks Tour	15,311 / 15,311	$2,932,204	
March 4	Bon Jovi	Goo Goo Dolls	Bounce Tour	14,288 / 14,288	$852,007	
April 1	Tim McGraw	—N/a	One Band Show Tour	17,114 / 17,114	$785,335	
April 3	Yanni	—N/a	Ethnicity Tour	—N/a	—N/a	
May 12	Matchbox Twenty	Maroon 5 Sugar Ray	More Than You Think You Are Tour	9,146 / 17,511	$386,924	
June 19	Dixie Chicks	Michelle Branch	Top of the World Tour	16,850 / 16,850	$1,111,390	
July 15	Eagles	—N/a	Farewell I Tour	36,852 / 38,792	$4,702,240	
July 17	Eagles	—N/a	Farewell I Tour	36,852 / 38,792	$4,702,240	
July 18	Eagles	—N/a	Farewell I Tour	36,852 / 38,792	$4,702,240	
August 5	Justin Timberlake; Christina Aguilera	The Black Eyed Peas	Justified and Stripped Tour	26,877 / 27,149	$1,694,442	
August 6	Justin Timberlake; Christina Aguilera	The Black Eyed Peas	Justified and Stripped Tour	26,877 / 27,149	$1,694,442	
September 20	Alan Jackson	Joe Nichols	2003 U.S. Tour	10,244 / 17,481	$531,383	
September 24 (Note: Fleetwood Mac's Say You Will Tour on September 24, 2003 was filmed for the band's video/music album, Fleetwood Mac: Live in Boston.)	Fleetwood Mac	—N/a	Say You Will Tour	13,100 / 14,609	$1,020,897	
October 7	Shania Twain	James Otto	Up! Tour	17,352 / 17,352	$1,175,490	
November 26	Aerosmith; Kiss	Automatic Black	Rocksimus Maximus Tour/ World Domination Tour	12,169 / 15,106	$1,231,375	
December 2	Phish	—N/a	Fall Tour 2003 (20th Anniversary Show)	17,569 / 17,569	$676,360	
December 7	Trans-Siberian Orchestra	—N/a	Christmas Eve & Other Stories	7,070 / 7,692	$293,952	
December 11	Simon & Garfunkel	The Everly Brothers	Old Friends Tour	33,085 / 33,085	$3,294,735	
December 13	Simon & Garfunkel	The Everly Brothers	Old Friends Tour	33,085 / 33,085	$3,294,735	
December 16	Dave Matthews & Friends	Emmylou Harris	2003 Fall Tour	17,242 / 17,242	$897,278	

2004

Concerts at FleetCenter
Date(s)	Headliner(s)	Supporting act(s)	Event / Tour	Attendance	Revenue	Ref(s)
January 20	Bette Midler	—N/a	Kiss My Brass	12,396 / 12,396	$1,481,476	
January 31	Sarah Brightman	—N/a	Harem World Tour	7,460 / 16,905	$495,980	
March 2	Barenaked Ladies	Gavin DeGraw; Butterfly Boucher	Everywhere for Everyone Tour	9,444 / 17,509	$399,430	
March 15	Bette Midler	—N/a	Kiss My Brass	9,832 / 13,354	$1,155,641	
March 24	Beyoncé; Alicia Keys; Missy Elliott	Tamia	Verizon Ladies First Tour	16,061 / 17,201	$815,963	
March 30	David Bowie	The Polyphonic Spree	A Reality Tour	—N/a	—N/a	
August 17	Prince	—N/a	Musicology Live 2004ever	45,649 / 49,085	$2,799,722	
August 18	Prince	Maceo Parker	Musicology Live 2004ever	45,649 / 49,085	$2,799,722	
August 19	Prince	Maceo Parker	Musicology Live 2004ever	45,649 / 49,085	$2,799,722	
August 22	Usher	Kanye West; Christina Milian	Truth Tour	13,870 / 13,870	$870,305	
September 15	Phil Collins	Jack Johnson	First Final Farewell Tour	11,960 / 14,500	$922,365	
September 17	Gloria Estefan	—N/a	Live & Re-Wrapped Tour	—N/a	—N/a	
September 28	Pearl Jam	Death Cab for Cutie; Gob Roberts	Vote for Change	35,240 / 35,240	$1,500,225	
September 29	Pearl Jam	Death Cab for Cutie; Gob Roberts	Vote for Change	35,240 / 35,240	$1,500,225	
October 1	Barry Manilow	—N/a	One Night Live! One Last Time!	12,463 / 18,290	$1,065,880	
October 24	Metallica	Godsmack	Madly in Anger with the World Tour	20,324 / 26,396	$1,504,100	
October 25	Metallica	Godsmack	Madly in Anger with the World Tour	20,324 / 26,396	$1,504,100	
October 29	R.E.M.	Angela McCluskey	Around the Sun Tour	7,968 / 12,500	$358,970	
November 1	Avril Lavigne	Butch Walker	Bonez Tour	10,340 / 12,500	$350,947	

2005

Concerts at FleetCenter / TD Banknorth Garden
Date(s)	Headliner(s)	Supporting act(s)	Event / Tour	Attendance	Revenue	Ref(s)
May 24	U2	Kings of Leon	Vertigo Tour	51,658 / 51,658	$5,071,565	
May 26	U2	Kings of Leon	Vertigo Tour	51,658 / 51,658	$5,071,565	
May 28	U2	Kings of Leon	Vertigo Tour	51,658 / 51,658	$5,071,565	
August 6	Destiny's Child	Destiny Fulfilled... and Lovin' It		6,867 / 12,500	$423,032	
August 15	Neil Diamond	—N/a	2005 Tour	29,752 / 29,752	$2,267,800	
August 16	Neil Diamond	—N/a	2005 Tour	29,752 / 29,752	$2,267,800	
September 16	Elton John	—N/a	Peachtree Road Tour	31,164 / 31,164	$2,648,935	
September 17	Elton John	—N/a	Peachtree Road Tour	31,164 / 31,164	$2,648,935	
September 26	Paul McCartney	—N/a	The 'US' Tour	29,582 / 29,582	$3,814,392	
September 27	Paul McCartney	—N/a	The 'US' Tour	29,582 / 29,582	$3,814,392	
October 3	U2	Keane	Vertigo Tour	34,488 / 34,488	$3,381,429	
October 4	U2	Keane	Vertigo Tour	34,488 / 34,488	$3,381,429	
October 28	Bruce Springsteen	—N/a	Devils & Dust Tour	18,124 / 18,124	$1,482,110	
October 30	Bruce Springsteen	—N/a	Devils & Dust Tour	18,124 / 18,124	$1,482,110	
October 31	Gwen Stefani	The Black Eyed Peas	Harajuku Lovers Tour; Monkey Business Tour	12,083 / 14,638	$688,490	
November 8	Nine Inch Nails	Queens of the Stone Age; Death from Above 1979	Live: With Teeth Tour	10,117 / 13,178	$470,132	
November 12	Aerosmith	Lenny Kravitz	Rockin' the Joint Tour	15,792 / 15,792	$1,372,235	
December 4	U2	Institute	Vertigo Tour	34,583 / 34,583	$3,400,861	
December 5	U2	Institute	Vertigo Tour	34,583 / 34,583	$3,400,861	
December 9	Bon Jovi	—N/a	Have a Nice Day Tour	27,941 / 27,941	$2,230,413	
December 10	Bon Jovi	—N/a	Have a Nice Day Tour	27,941 / 27,941	$2,230,413	
December 15	Dave Matthews Band	Mike Doughty	2005 Fall Tour	17,310 / 17,310	$901,320	

2006

Concerts at TD Banknorth Garden
Date(s)	Headliner(s)	Supporting act(s)	Event / Tour	Attendance	Revenue	Ref(s)
January 13	The Rolling Stones	Sloan	A Bigger Bang	26,784 / 26,784	$4,990,074	
January 15	The Rolling Stones	Sloan	A Bigger Bang	26,784 / 26,784	$4,990,074	
January 19	Billy Joel	—N/a	2006 World Tour	49,825 / 49,825	$3,575,344	
January 30	Billy Joel	—N/a	2006 World Tour	49,825 / 49,825	$3,575,344	
February 4	Billy Joel	—N/a	2006 World Tour	49,825 / 49,825	$3,575,344	
May 24	Pearl Jam	My Morning Jacket	2006 World Tour	33,181 / 33,181	$1,665,966	
May 25	Pearl Jam	My Morning Jacket	2006 World Tour	33,181 / 33,181	$1,665,966	
June 25	Tim McGraw; Faith Hill	—N/a	Soul2Soul II Tour	33,851 / 33,851	$2,523,545	
June 26	Tim McGraw; Faith Hill	—N/a	Soul2Soul II Tour	33,851 / 33,851	$2,523,545	
July 6	Madonna	—N/a	Confessions Tour	36,741 / 36,741	$6,337,115	
July 9	Madonna	—N/a	Confessions Tour	36,741 / 36,741	$6,337,115	
July 10	Madonna	—N/a	Confessions Tour	36,741 / 36,741	$6,337,115	
July 29	Dixie Chicks	Bob Schneider	Accidents & Accusations Tour	10,582 / 10,582	$730,981	
August 21	Mariah Carey	Sean Paul	The Adventures of Mimi	11,993 / 14,922	$1,034,794	
September 5	Shakira	Wyclef Jean	Oral Fixation Tour	10,735 / 13,068	$748,649	
September 16	The Who	Peeping Tom	The Who Tour 2006–2007	—N/a	—N/a	
October 2	Red Hot Chili Peppers	The Mars Volta	Stadium Arcadium World Tour	30,064 / 30,064 (Note: The score data for Red Hot Chili Peppers' Stadium Arcadium World Tour is combined from the shows on October 2 and 20, 2004.)	$1,840,680	
October 3	Eric Clapton	The Robert Cray Band	Back Home Tour	18,826 / 21,891	$2,101,235	
October 4	Eric Clapton	The Robert Cray Band	Back Home Tour	18,826 / 21,891	$2,101,235	
October 20	Red Hot Chili Peppers	The Mars Volta	Stadium Arcadium World Tour	30,064 / 30,064	$1,840,680	
October 22	Barbra Streisand	Il Divo	Streisand	14,807 / 14,807	$4,766,650	
December 2	The Who	Peeping Tom	The Who Tour 2006–2007	—N/a	—N/a	

2007

Concerts at TD Banknorth Garden
Date(s)	Headliner(s)	Supporting act(s)	Event / Tour	Attendance	Revenue	Ref(s)
January 27	Bob Seger; The Silver Bullet Band	Steve Azar	Face the Promise Tour	14,915 / 14,915	$1,130,090	
February 3	Rod Stewart	—N/a	Rockin' in the Round Tour	12,868 / 12,868	$1,206,415	
February 6	Justin Timberlake	Pink	FutureSex/LoveShow	16,668 / 16,668	$1,271,590	
March 2	Josh Groban	Angélique Kidjo	Awake Tour	13,907 / 13,907	$1,093,095	
March 30	Christina Aguilera	Pussycat Dolls; Danity Kane	Back to Basics Tour	—N/a	—N/a	
July 5	Tim McGraw; Faith Hill	Lori McKenna	Soul2Soul II Tour	28,417 / 28,417	$2,420,461	
July 6	Tim McGraw; Faith Hill	Lori McKenna	Soul2Soul II Tour	28,417 / 28,417	$2,420,461	
July 9	Roger Waters	—N/a	The Dark Side of the Moon Live	—N/a	—N/a	
July 17	John Mayer	Ben Folds	Continuum Tour	12,877 / 12,877	$703,314	
August 10	Justin Timberlake	Good Charlotte	FutureSex/LoveShow	—N/a	—N/a	
August 12	Beyoncé	—N/a	The Beyoncé Experience	—N/a	—N/a	
September 9	Barry Manilow	—N/a	2007 U.S. Tour	9,919 / 12,902	$857,045	
September 11	Genesis	—N/a	Turn It On Again: The Tour	12,400 / 12,400	$1,820,625	
October 15	Maroon 5	The Hives	It Won't Be Soon Before Long Tour	—N/a	—N/a	
October 30	Van Halen	Ky-Mani Marley	2007–2008 North American Tour	14,261 / 14,261	$1,501,122	
November 11	The Police	Fiction Plane	The Police Reunion Tour	14,256 / 14,256	$1,804,535	
November 18	Bruce Springsteen; E Street Band	—N/a	Magic Tour	33,289 / 33,289	$3,072,570	
November 19	Bruce Springsteen; E Street Band	—N/a	Magic Tour	33,289 / 33,289	$3,072,570	

2008

Concerts at TD Banknorth Garden
Date(s)	Headliner(s)	Supporting act(s)	Event / Tour	Attendance	Revenue	Ref(s)
January 30	Spice Girls	—N/a	The Return of the Spice Girls	—N/a	—N/a	
April 3	Jay-Z; Mary J. Blige	The-Dream	Heart of the City Tour	12,847 / 12,847	$1,199,576	
June 11	Alicia Keys	Ne-Yo	As I Am Tour	—N/a	—N/a	
June 13	Tom Petty and the Heartbreakers	Steve Winwood	2008 Summer Tour	14,472 / 14,472	$1,120,918	
July 9	Bon Jovi	The All-American Rejects	Lost Highway Tour	30,141 / 30,141	$2,845,877	
July 10	Bon Jovi	The All-American Rejects	Lost Highway Tour	30,141 / 30,141	$2,845,877	
July 27	George Michael	—N/a	25 Live	10,325 / 14,000	—N/a	
July 28	Eagles	—N/a	Long Road Out of Eden Tour	23,374 / 24,097	$2,989,885	
July 30	Eagles	—N/a	Long Road Out of Eden Tour	23,374 / 24,097	$2,989,885	
August 4	Coldplay	Santigold	Viva la Vida Tour	14,445 / 14,445	$1,229,417	
August 12	Celine Dion	Gordie Brown	Taking Chances World Tour	32,493 / 32,493	$3,813,519	
August 13	Celine Dion	Gordie Brown	Taking Chances World Tour	32,493 / 32,493	$3,813,519	
September 26	New Kids on the Block	Natasha Bedingfield; Colby O'Donis	New Kids on the Block Live	27,017 / 27,017	$1,703,505	
September 28	New Kids on the Block	Natasha Bedingfield; Colby O'Donis	New Kids on the Block Live	27,017 / 27,017	$1,703,505	
October 15	Madonna	Paul Oakenfold	Sticky & Sweet Tour	26,611 / 26,611	$3,658,850	
October 16	Madonna	Paul Oakenfold	Sticky & Sweet Tour	26,611 / 26,611	$3,658,850	
October 29	Coldplay	Duffy	Viva la Vida Tour	14,559 / 14,559	$1,256,599	
November 9	AC/DC	The Answer	Black Ice World Tour	13,718 / 13,718	$1,255,040	
November 16	Tina Turner	—N/a	Tina!: 50th Anniversary Tour	24,845 / 24,845	$2,632,184	
November 17	Tina Turner	—N/a	Tina!: 50th Anniversary Tour	24,845 / 24,845	$2,632,184	
November 24	Sarah Brightman	Fernando Lima; Alessandro Safina; Mario Frangoulis	The Symphony World Tour	4,133 / 6,457	$432,337	

2009

Concerts at TD Banknorth Garden / TD Garden
Date(s)	Headliner(s)	Supporting act(s)	Event / Tour	Attendance	Revenue	Ref(s)
January 18	Metallica	Machine Head; The Sword	World Magnetic Tour	17,066 / 17,066	$1,144,875	
March 11	Fleetwood Mac	—N/a	Unleashed	13,005 / 17,388	$1,292,161	
March 16	Britney Spears	The Pussycat Dolls	The Circus Starring Britney Spears	16,659 / 16,659	$1,909,235	
April 21	Bruce Springsteen; E Street Band	—N/a	Working on a Dream Tour	31,713 / 33,035	$3,006,655	
April 22	Bruce Springsteen; E Street Band	—N/a	Working on a Dream Tour	31,713 / 33,035	$3,006,655	
July 17	Jonas Brothers	Jordin Sparks; Honor Society; Wonder Girls	Jonas Brothers World Tour 2009	—N/a	—N/a	
July 18	Jonas Brothers	Jordin Sparks; Honor Society; Wonder Girls	Jonas Brothers World Tour 2009	—N/a	—N/a	
July 20	Green Day	The Bravery	21st Century Breakdown World Tour	—N/a	—N/a	
July 31	Keith Urban	Taylor Swift	Escape Together World Tour	—N/a	—N/a	
August 18	Kris Allen; Adam Lambert; Danny Gokey; Allison Iraheta; Matt Giraud; Anoop Desai; Lil Rounds; Scott MacIntyre; Megan Joy; Michael Sarver	—N/a	American Idols LIVE! Tour 2009	12,616 / 12,616	$757,867	
August 29	Britney Spears	Jordin Sparks; Kristinia DeBarge; One Call	The Circus Starring Britney Spears	15,330 / 15,330	$1,036,457	
September 4	The Killers	Wolfmother	Day & Age World Tour	—N/a	—N/a	
October 2	Pink	The Ting Tings	Funhouse Tour	13,922 / 13,922	$611,106	
October 5	Kiss	Buckcherry	Alive 35 World Tour	8,560 / 8,560	$600,353	
November 9	Miley Cyrus	Metro Station	Wonder World Tour	14,981 / 14,981	$1,111,590	
November 14 (Note: There were multiple shows on this date.)	Royal Philharmonic Orchestra	—N/a	Star Wars: In Concert	—N/a	—N/a	

== 2010s ==
2010

Concerts at TD Garden
Date(s)	Headliner(s)	Supporting act(s)	Event / Tour	Attendance	Revenue	Ref(s)
February 24	John Mayer	Michael Franti and Spearhead	Battle Studies World Tour	14,654 / 14,654	$936,350	
February 26	The Black Eyed Peas	Ludacris; LMFAO	The E.N.D. World Tour	15,430 / 15,430	$1,060,401	
March 6	Muse	Silversun Pickups	The Resistance Tour	14,770 / 14,770	$737,795	
March 11	Jay-Z	Young Jeezy; Trey Songz	Jay-Z Fall Tour	13,331 / 13,331	$1,304,455	
May 17	Pearl Jam	Band of Horses	Backspacer Tour	15,600 / 15,600	$1,211,623	
May 22	Glee Cast:Dianna Agron; Chris Colfer; Darren Criss; Ashley Fink; Kevin McHale; Lea Michele; Cory Monteith; Heather Morris; Chord Overstreet; Amber Riley; Naya Rivera; Mark Salling; Harry Shum Jr. Jenna Ushkowitz	The XLD	Glee Live! In Concert!	18,895 / 18,895	$624,453	
May 23	Glee Cast:Dianna Agron; Chris Colfer; Darren Criss; Ashley Fink; Kevin McHale; Lea Michele; Cory Monteith; Heather Morris; Chord Overstreet; Amber Riley; Naya Rivera; Mark Salling; Harry Shum Jr. Jenna Ushkowitz	The XLD	Glee Live! In Concert!	18,895 / 18,895	$624,453	
June 19	Carole King; James Taylor	—N/a	Troubadour Reunion Tour	30,851 / 34,032	$3,052,520	
June 20	Carole King; James Taylor	—N/a	Troubadour Reunion Tour	30,851 / 34,032	$3,052,520	
July 1	Lady Gaga	Semi Precious Weapons	The Monster Ball Tour	—N/a	—N/a	
July 2	Lady Gaga	Semi Precious Weapons	The Monster Ball Tour	—N/a	—N/a	
August 3	The Black Eyed Peas	T-Pain	The E.N.D. World Tour	13,212 / 13,212	$912,823	
September 14	Rush	—N/a	Time Machine Tour	11,331 / 11,903	$948,004	
September 30	Roger Waters	—N/a	The Wall Live	34,120 / 34,626	$3,836,070	
October 1	Roger Waters	—N/a	The Wall Live	34,120 / 34,626	$3,836,070	
October 3	Roger Waters	—N/a	The Wall Live	34,120 / 34,626	$3,836,070	
November 9	Dave Matthews Band	John Butler Trio	2010 Fall Tour	23,934 / 34,200	$1,838,510	
November 10	Dave Matthews Band	John Butler Trio	2010 Fall Tour	23,934 / 34,200	$1,838,510	
November 14	Kings of Leon	—N/a	Come Around Sundown World Tour	—N/a	—N/a	
November 16	Justin Bieber	Burnham; Jasmine Villegas; Sean Kingston	My World Tour	14,080 / 14,080	$843,180	
November 27	Michael Bublé	Naturally 7	Crazy Love Tour	12,227 / 12,227	$1,037,383	
December 21	Usher	Trey Songz; Miguel	OMG Tour	12,226 / 12,226	$901,581	

2011

Concerts at TD Garden
Date(s)	Headliner(s)	Supporting act(s)	Event / Tour	Attendance	Revenue	Ref(s)
February 1	Linkin Park	Does It Offend You, Yeah? Pendulum	A Thousand Suns World Tour	—N/a	—N/a	
March 1	Bon Jovi	—N/a	Bon Jovi Live	15,928 / 15,928	$1,675,208	
March 8	Lady Gaga	Scissor Sisters	The Monster Ball Tour	14,361 / 14,361	$1,525,663	
March 30	Stevie Nicks; Rod Stewart	—N/a	Heart & Soul Tour	11,947 / 11,947	$1,320,994	
April 15	Bob Seger; The Silver Bullet Band	Frankie Ballard	2011 North American Tour	14,883 / 14,883	$1,095,938	
June 4	New Kids on the Block; Backstreet Boys	Jordin Sparks	NKOTBSB Tour	13,224 / 13,224	$976,833	
June 7	Dianna Agron; Chris Colfer; Darren Criss; Ashley Fink; Kevin McHale; Lea Michele; Cory Monteith; Heather Morris; Chord Overstreet; Amber Riley; Naya Rivera; Mark Salling; Harry Shum Jr. Jenna Ushkowitz	The LXD	Glee Live! In Concert!	12,735 / 12,735	$1,075,343	
June 18	Katy Perry	Robyn; DJ Skeet Skeet	California Dreams Tour	12,589 / 12,589	$557,977	
June 24	Dispatch	Elephant Revival	DISPATCH 2011	N/A	N/A	
July 6	Sade	John Legend	Sade Live	9,422 / 11,334	$937,064	
July 8	Keith Urban	Jake Owen	Get Closer World Tour	—N/a	—N/a	
July 24	Rihanna	J. Cole; CeeLo Green	Loud Tour	—N/a	—N/a	
July 26	Josh Groban	—N/a	Straight to You Tour	—N/a	—N/a	
August 8	Britney Spears	Nicki Minaj; DJ Pauly D	Femme Fatale Tour	—N/a	—N/a	
September 22	Enrique Iglesias	Pitbull; Prince Royce	Euphoria Tour	12,267 / 12,267	$603,196	
November 16	Foo Fighters	Social Distortion; The Joy Formidable	Wasting Light World Tour	—N/a	—N/a	
November 21	Jay-Z; Kanye West	—N/a	Watch the Throne Tour	—N/a	—N/a	

2012

Concerts at TD Garden
Date(s)	Headliner(s)	Supporting act(s)	Event / Tour	Attendance	Revenue	Ref(s)
January 28	Tool	YOB	Tool Winter Tour	—N/a	—N/a	
March 7	The Black Keys	Arctic Monkeys	El Camino Tour	13,428 / 13,428	$649,567	
March 11	Van Halen	Kool & the Gang	A Different Kind of Truth Tour	—N/a	—N/a	
March 26	Bruce Springsteen; E Street Band	—N/a	Wrecking Ball World Tour	16,779 / 16,779	$1,577,847	
May 7	Red Hot Chili Peppers	Sleigh Bells	I'm with You World Tour	13,330 / 13,330	$824,600	
June 23	Neil Diamond	—N/a	Hot August Night; 40th Anniversary World Tour	—N/a	—N/a	
July 17	Aerosmith	Cheap Trick	Global Warming Tour	—N/a	—N/a	
July 19	Aerosmith	Cheap Trick	Global Warming Tour	—N/a	—N/a	
July 25	Jennifer Lopez; Enrique Iglesias	Frankie J	Dance Again World Tour	10,416 / 10,416	$794,276	
July 29	Coldplay	Marina and the Diamonds; Emeli Sandé	Mylo Xyloto Tour	32,248 / 32,248	$2,744,129	
July 30	Coldplay	Marina and the Diamonds; Emeli Sandé	Mylo Xyloto Tour	32,248 / 32,248	$2,744,129	
September 4	Madonna	—N/a	The MDNA Tour	13,995 / 13,995	$2,450,720	
September 24	Peter Gabriel	Jennie Abrahamson; Linnea Olsson	Back to Front Tour	5,671 / 9,215	$519,413	
October 24	Rush	—N/a	Clockwork Angels Tour	9,861 / 10,031	$841,953	
November 10	Justin Bieber	Cody Simpson; Jaden Smith	Believe Tour	13,561 / 13,561	$1,087,270	
November 16	The Who	—N/a	The Who Tour 2012–2013	11,927 / 12,135	$966,739	
November 18	Bob Dylan	Mark Knopfler	Never Ending Tour	—N/a	—N/a	
November 26	Neil Young; Crazy Horse	Patti Smith; Everest	2012 Tour	10,130 / 10,130	$1,042,608	
December 9	Dave Matthews Band	Jimmy Cliff	2012 Winter Tour	12,710 / 15,248	$1,003,190	

2013

Concerts at TD Garden
Date(s)	Headliner(s)	Supporting act(s)	Event / Tour	Attendance	Revenue	Ref(s)
February 5	Mumford & Sons	The Felice Brothers	Babel Tour	—N/a	—N/a	
March 15	Dropkick Murphys	—N/a	Saint Patrick's Day Tour	—N/a	—N/a	
March 28	Pink	The Hives	The Truth About Love Tour	14,766 / 14,766	$1,142,061	
April 12	Muse	Biffy Clyro	The 2nd Law World Tour	12,187 / 12,187	$729,695	
April 18	Fleetwood Mac	—N/a	Fleetwood Mac Live	—N/a	—N/a	
May 6 (Note: Rihanna's Diamonds World Tour was initially scheduled for March 10, 2013, but was postponed to May 6 due to the singer's laryngitis.)	Rihanna	ASAP Rocky	Diamonds World Tour	14,083 / 14,083	$1,061,548	
May 30	Aerosmith; Jason Aldean; Bell Biv DeVoe; Boston; Boyz II Men; Jimmy Buffett; Dane Cook; Dropkick Murphys; Extreme; Godsmack; The J. Geils Band; Carole King; The Monkees; New Kids on the Block; Buffalo Springfield; James Taylor; Steven Wright; Neil Young		Boston Strong: An Evening of Support and Celebration	—N/a	—N/a	
June 2	Boyz II Men; 98 Degrees; New Kids on the Block	—N/a	The Package Tour	—N/a	—N/a	
June 3	Boyz II Men; 98 Degrees; New Kids on the Block	—N/a	The Package Tour	—N/a	—N/a	
June 12	The Rolling Stones	—N/a	50 & Counting	24,277 / 24,277	$7,577,375	
June 14	The Rolling Stones	—N/a	50 & Counting	24,277 / 24,277	$7,577,375	
June 26	Bruno Mars	Fitz and the Tantrums	Moonshine Jungle Tour	14,267 / 14,267	$1,030,157	
July 20	Justin Bieber	Hot Chelle Rae; Mike Posner	Believe Tour	13,450 / 13,450	$1,123,874	
July 23	Beyoncé	Luke James	The Mrs. Carter Show World Tour	12,911 / 12,911	$1,574,130	
September 27	Michael Bublé	Naturally 7	To Be Loved Tour	11,505 / 11,505	$1,140,561	
October 9	Avenged Sevenfold	Deftones; Ghost	Hail to the King Tour	4,610 / 12,000	$248,477	
October 11	Nine Inch Nails	Godspeed You! Black Emperor	Twenty Thirteen Tour	—N/a	—N/a	
October 12	Selena Gomez	Emblem3; Christina Grimmie	Stars Dance Tour	—N/a	—N/a	
October 28	Josh Groban	Judith Hill	All That Echoes World Tour	—N/a	—N/a	
October 30	Drake	Future	Would You Like a Tour?	—N/a	—N/a	
November 8	Macklemore & Ryan Lewis	Big K.R.I.T.	2013 U.S. Tour	—N/a	—N/a	
November 12	Elton John	2Cellos	The Diving Board Tour	—N/a	—N/a	
November 17	Kanye West	Kendrick Lamar	The Yeezus Tour	12,889 / 12,889	$1,099,938	
December 4 (Note: Rod Stewart's Live the Life Tour was initially scheduled for April 13, 2013, but was postponed to December 4 in order to allow time for Stewart to finish the pre-production and promotion of his album, Time.)	Rod Stewart	Steve Winwood	Live the Life Tour	—N/a	—N/a	
December 5	Pink	The Hives	The Truth About Love Tour	14,306 / 14,306	$1,418,435	
December 20	Beyoncé	Luke James	The Mrs. Carter Show World Tour	13,003 / 13,003	$1,686,370	

2014

Concerts at TD Garden
Date(s)	Headliner(s)	Supporting act(s)	Event / Tour	Attendance	Revenue	Ref(s)
January 18	Jay Z	Timbaland	Magna Carter World Tour	—N/a	—N/a	
January 31	Lady Antebellum	Kip Moore; Kacey Musgraves; Thomas Rhett; Lauren Alaina	Take Me Downtown Tour	10,921 / 10,921	$673,922	
February 27	Justin Timberlake	DJ Freestyle	The 20/20 Experience World Tour	13,815 / 13,815	$1,622,639	
February 28	Kings of Leon	Gary Clark Jr.	Mechanical Bull Tour	—N/a	—N/a	
March 3	Sting; Paul Simon	—N/a	On Stage Together Tour	12,066 / 12,066	$1,458,125	
March 8	The Avett Brothers	Old Crow Medicine Show	2014 U.S. Tour	—N/a	—N/a	
April 2	Miley Cyrus	Icona Pop; Sky Ferreira	Bangerz Tour	—N/a	—N/a	
April 9	Cher	Pat Benatar; Neil Giraldo	Dressed to Kill Tour	12,792 / 12,792	$1,341,828	
May 15	Barry Gibb	—N/a	Mythology Tour	—N/a	—N/a	
June 25 (Note: During Avicii's True Tour on June 25, 2014, 36 people were hospitalized following dehydration and minor injuries involving alcohol and drug use as reported by the Boston Emergency Medical Services.)	Avicii	Henrik B	True Tour	—N/a	—N/a	
June 30	Lady Gaga	Lady Starlight; Crayon Pop	ArtRave: The Artpop Ball	13,848 / 13,848	$1,190,212	
July 2	Bruno Mars	Aloe Blacc	Moonshine Jungle Tour	14,450 / 14,450	$1,389,163	
July 19 (Note: The show of July 19, 2014 for Justin Timberlake's The 20/20 Experience World Tour was initially scheduled for November 4, 2013, but was rescheduled to the later date due to the extension of rehearsals.)	Justin Timberlake	DJ Freestyle	The 20/20 Experience World Tour	14,119 / 14,119	$1,610,576	
July 22	Queen + Adam Lambert	—N/a	2014–2015 Tour	—N/a	—N/a	
August 1	Katy Perry	Capital Cities; Ferras	Prismatic World Tour	26,227 / 26,227	$3,178,415	
August 2	Katy Perry	Capital Cities; Ferras	Prismatic World Tour	26,227 / 26,227	$3,178,415	
September 15	Eagles	—N/a	History of the Eagles – Live in Concert	—N/a	—N/a	
September 21	The Black Keys	Cage the Elephant	Turn Blue World Tour	—N/a	—N/a	
September 27	Enrique Iglesias	Pitbull; J Balvin	Sex and Love Tour	12,543 / 12,543	$1,068,421	
October 10	Fleetwood Mac	—N/a	On with the Show	—N/a	—N/a	
October 25	Fleetwood Mac	—N/a	On with the Show	—N/a	—N/a	
November 11	Stevie Wonder	—N/a	Songs in the Key of Life Tour	—N/a	—N/a	
November 13	Usher	DJ Cassidy; August Alsina	UR Experience Tour	—N/a	—N/a	
November 29	Bob Seger; The Silver Bullet Band	The J. Geils Band	Ride Out Tour	—N/a	—N/a	

2015

Concerts at TD Garden
Date(s)	Headliner(s)	Supporting act(s)	Event / Tour	Attendance	Revenue	Ref(s)
January 22	Garth Brooks; Trisha Yearwood	Karyn Rochelle	The Garth Brooks World Tour with Trisha Yearwood	—N/a	—N/a	
January 23	Garth Brooks; Trisha Yearwood	—N/a	The Garth Brooks World Tour with Trisha Yearwood	—N/a	—N/a	
January 24	Garth Brooks; Trisha Yearwood	—N/a	The Garth Brooks World Tour with Trisha Yearwood	—N/a	—N/a	
January 25	Garth Brooks; Trisha Yearwood	—N/a	The Garth Brooks World Tour with Trisha Yearwood	—N/a	—N/a	
March 3	Maroon 5	Magic! Rozzi Crane	Maroon V Tour	14,468 / 14,468	$1,368,256	
March 23	Neil Diamond	—N/a	Melody Road Tour	8,242 / 9,177	$988,466	
April 30	Eric Church	Chris Stapleton	The Outsiders World Tour	15,560 / 16,667	$787,848	
June 12	Bette Midler	—N/a	Divine Intervention Tour	10,303 / 10,303	$1,416,485	
June 16	Barry Manilow	—N/a	One Last Time!	—N/a	—N/a	
June 23	Rush	—N/a	R40 Live Tour	12,953 / 12,953	$1,232,122	
June 24	New Kids on the Block	TLC; Nelly	The Main Event	—N/a	—N/a	
June 25	New Kids on the Block	TLC; Nelly	The Main Event	—N/a	—N/a	
July 1	Imagine Dragons	Halsey; Metric	Smoke + Mirrors Tour	—N/a	—N/a	
July 8	Shania Twain	Gavin DeGraw	Rock This Country Tour	10,644 / 11,822	$1,147,214	
July 10	U2	—N/a	Innocence + Experience Tour	68,183 / 68,183	$8,469,855	
July 11	U2	—N/a	Innocence + Experience Tour	68,183 / 68,183	$8,469,855	
July 14	U2	—N/a	Innocence + Experience Tour	68,183 / 68,183	$8,469,855	
July 15	U2	—N/a	Innocence + Experience Tour	68,183 / 68,183	$8,469,855	
September 26	Madonna	Michael Diamond	Rebel Heart Tour	12,780 / 12,780	$1,941,750	
October 9	Marc Anthony; Carlos Vives	—N/a	Unido2	8,456 / 12,389	$857,328	

2016

Concerts at TD Garden
Date(s)	Headliner(s)	Supporting act(s)	Event / Tour	Attendance	Revenue	Ref(s)
January 25	Muse	X Ambassadors	Drones World Tour	11,111 / 16,372	$740,815	
February 4	Bruce Springsteen; E Street Band	—N/a	The River Tour 2016	17,039 / 17,039	$2,062,417	
February 23	Carrie Underwood	Easton Corbin; The Swon Brothers	Storyteller Tour: Stories in the Round	16,786 / 16,786	$1,076,169	
March 7	The Who	Tal Wilkenfeld	The Who Hits 50!	13,054 / 13,054	$1,289,318	
April 10	Rihanna	Travis Scott	Anti World Tour	12,295 / 12,589	$1,180,615	
May 10	Justin Bieber	Post Malone; Moxie Raia	Purpose World Tour	28,406 / 28,406	$2,962,651	
May 11	Justin Bieber	Post Malone; Moxie Raia	Purpose World Tour	28,406 / 28,406	$2,962,651	
May 28	Selena Gomez	DNCE; Bea Miller	Revival Tour	10,274 / 10,324	$705,745	
June 15	Ellie Goulding	Years & Years; Cedric Gervais; Matt and Kim	Delirium World Tour	10,537 / 12,502	—N/a	
July 20	Demi Lovato; Nick Jonas	Mike Posner	Future Now Tour	10,357 / 11,290	$675,598	
August 10	Drake	Future; Roy Woods dvsn	Summer Sixteen Tour	13,490 / 13,951	$1,463,377	
August 12	Pitbull	Prince Royce; Farruko	The Bad Man Tour	—N/a	—N/a	
August 16	Barbra Streisand	—N/a	Barbra: The Music, The Mem'ries, The Magic	13,493 / 13,493	$3,663,178	
September 3	Kanye West	—N/a	Saint Pablo Tour	16,182 / 16,495	$1,512,328	
September 14	Adele	—N/a	Adele Live 2016	27,183 / 27,183	$3,022,975	
September 15	Adele	—N/a	Adele Live 2016	27,183 / 27,183	$3,022,975	
September 24	P. Diddy	Various Bad Boy artists	Bad Boy Family Reunion Tour	11,122 / 12,254	$955,143	
October 1	Blake Shelton	RaeLynn	2016 Fall Tour	11,537 / 11,537	$818,728	
October 18	Sia	Miguel; AlunaGeorge	Nostalgic for the Present Tour	—N/a	—N/a	
November 9	Pentatonix	Us the Duo; Abi Ann	Pentatonix World Tour 2016	—N/a	—N/a	
November 17	Stevie Nicks	The Pretenders	24 Karat Gold Tour	10,396 / 12,176	$1,117,205	

2017

Concerts at TD Garden
Date(s)	Headliner(s)	Supporting act(s)	Event / Tour	Attendance	Revenue	Ref(s)
January 13	Kings of Leon	Deerhunter	Walls Tour	11,104 / 13,253	$634,290	
January 28	Eric Church	—N/a	Holdin' My Own Tour	16,697 / 16,697	$1,018,761	
February 7	Red Hot Chili Peppers	Trombone Shorty & Orleans Avenue; Jack Irons	The Getaway World Tour	26,145 / 26,145	$2,435,608	
February 8	Red Hot Chili Peppers	Trombone Shorty & Orleans Avenue; Jack Irons	The Getaway World Tour	26,145 / 26,145	$2,435,608	
March 3	Ariana Grande	Victoria Monét; Little Mix	Dangerous Woman Tour	12,349 / 12,944	$1,105,421	
March 6	Ramin Djawadi	—N/a	Game of Thrones Live Concert Experience	8,851 / 15,308	$591,156	
April 2	Chris Brown	Fabolous; O.T. Genasis; Kap G	The Party Tour	9,417 / 16,526	$711,762	
April 9	John Mayer	The Record Company	The Search for Everything World Tour	13,454 / 13,763	$968,536	
June 2	The Chainsmokers	Kiiara; Emily Warren	Memories Do Not Open Tour	14,080 / 14,080	$543,180	
June 24	Hall & Oates; Tears for Fears	Allen Stone	2017 Tour	—	—	
July 7	Tim McGraw; Faith Hill	Lori McKenna	Soul2Soul: The World Tour	24,187 / 24,187	$2,132,287	
July 8	Tim McGraw; Faith Hill	Lori McKenna	Soul2Soul: The World Tour	24,187 / 24,187	$2,132,287	
July 13	Boston	Joan Jett and the Blackhearts	Hyper Space Tour	—	—	
July 20	Tom Petty and the Heartbreakers	Peter Wolf	40th Anniversary Tour	23,987 / 23,987	$2,674,665	
July 21	Tom Petty and the Heartbreakers	Peter Wolf	40th Anniversary Tour	23,987 / 23,987	$2,674,665	
July 22	Kendrick Lamar	Travis Scott; DRAM	The Damn Tour	10,773 / 12,889	$900,540	
July 25	Queen + Adam Lambert	—N/a	2017 Tour	10,984 / 11,486	$1,139,680	
August 4	J. Cole	Bas; J.I.D; Ari Lennox	4 Your Eyez Only World Tour	12,338 / 12,338	$1,150,575	
August 5	Earth, Wind & Fire; Chic	—N/a	2054 – The Tour	4,315 / 6,945	$348,451	
August 22 (Note: Lionel Richie and Mariah Carey's All the Hits Tour was initially scheduled for April 7, 2017, but was postponed to August 22 in order to allow Richie to recover from his knee surgery.)	Lionel Richie; Mariah Carey	Tauren Wells	All the Hits Tour	10,192 / 13,264	$947,678	
August 23	Shawn Mendes	Charlie Puth	Illuminate World Tour	13,065 / 13,065	$771,325	
September 14	Bob Seger; The Silver Bullet Band	Nancy Wilson	2017 North American Tour	14,124 / 14,272	$1,575,531	
September 15	Arcade Fire	Preservation Hall Jazz Band	Infinite Content Tour	8,410 / 15,950	$495,154	
September 22	Ed Sheeran	James Blunt	÷ Tour	25,590 / 25,590	$2,295,216	
September 23	Ed Sheeran	James Blunt	÷ Tour	25,590 / 25,590	$2,295,216	
September 27	Roger Waters	—N/a	Us + Them Tour	24,094 / 24,094	$3,331,153	
September 28	Roger Waters	—N/a	Us + Them Tour	24,094 / 24,094	$3,331,153	
September 29	Katy Perry	Noah Cyrus	Witness: The Tour	—	—	
September 30	Katy Perry	Noah Cyrus	Witness: The Tour	—	—	
October 6	Halsey	Charli XCX; PartyNextDoor	Hopeless Fountain Kingdom World Tour	7,872 / 8,059	$387,372	
October 7	Bruno Mars	Jorja Smith	24K Magic World Tour	28,839 / 28,839	$3,695,807	
October 8	Bruno Mars	Jorja Smith	24K Magic World Tour	28,839 / 28,839	$3,695,807	
October 12	Enrique Iglesias; Pitbull	CNCO	Enrique Iglesias and Pitbull Live!	10,535 / 10,535	$1,032,208	
October 22	Guns N' Roses	—N/a	Not in This Lifetime... Tour	—	—	
October 27	Fall Out Boy	Blackbear; Jaden Smith	The Mania Tour	—	—	
October 29	Imagine Dragons	Grouplove; K.Flay	Evolve World Tour	12,658 / 13,159	$855,279	
November 5	Janet Jackson	DJ Aktive	State of the World Tour	9,956 / 12,545	$798,339	
November 17	Dead & Company	—N/a	Dead & Company Fall Tour 2017	—	—	
November 19	Dead & Company	—N/a	Dead & Company Fall Tour 2017	—	—	
November 25	Jay-Z	Vic Mensa	4:44 Tour	—	—	

2018

Concerts at TD Garden
Date(s)	Headliner(s)	Supporting act(s)	Event / Tour	Attendance	Revenue	Ref.
January 7	The Killers	Alex Cameron	Wonderful Wonderful World Tour	12,695 / 13,185	$729,879	
January 13	Lana Del Rey	Jhené Aiko	LA to the Moon Tour	11,813 / 13,297	$966,495	
March 26	Demi Lovato	DJ Khaled; Kehlani	Tell Me You Love Me World Tour	14,011 / 14,011	$1,197,312	
April 2	Bon Jovi	—N/a	This House Is Not For Sale Tour	-	-	-
April 3	Lorde	Run the Jewels; Mitski	Melodrama World Tour	—	—	
April 9	Pink	Bleachers	Beautiful Trauma World Tour	32,403 / 32,403	$4,668,640	
April 10	Pink	Bleachers	Beautiful Trauma World Tour	32,403 / 32,403	$4,668,640	
May 12	Kygo	Blackbear	Kids in Love Tour	—	—	
June 9	Depeche Mode	EMA	Global Spirit Tour	11,581 / 19,600	$1,011,092	
June 18	Harry Styles	Kacey Musgraves	Harry Styles: Live on Tour	16,146 / 16,146	$1,273,432	
June 21	U2	—N/a	Experience + Innocence Tour	32,403 / 32,403	$5,539,769	
June 22	U2	—N/a	Experience + Innocence Tour	32,403 / 32,403	$5,539,769	
June 26	Sam Smith	—N/a	The Thrill of It All Tour	12,953 / 12,953	$1,117,800	
July 11	Shania Twain	Bastian Baker	Now Tour	12,818 / 12,818	$1,169,006	
July 20	Eagles	—N/a	2018 Tour	—	—	
July 21	Eagles	—N/a	2018 Tour	—	—	
July 25	Panic! at the Disco	Hayley Kiyoko; A R I Z O N A	Pray for the Wicked Tour	13,059 / 13,059	$799,178	
July 27	Arctic Monkeys	Mini Mansions	Tranquility Base Hotel & Casino Tour	—	—	
July 28	Radiohead	Junun	A Moon Shaped Pool Tour	—	—	
July 29	Radiohead	Junun	A Moon Shaped Pool Tour	—	—	
July 31	The Smashing Pumpkins	Metric	Shiny And Oh So Bright Tour	—	—	
October 6	Elton John	—N/a	Farewell Yellow Brick Road	13,946 / 14,168	$1,953,520	
October 7	Maroon 5	Julia Michaels	Red Pill Blues Tour	13,225 / 13,485	$1,600,769	
October 10	J. Cole		KOD Tour	9,826 / 13,370	$942,350	
October 12	Florence and the Machine	Grizzly Bear	High as Hope Tour	—	—	
October 14	Gorillaz	Little Dragon	The Now Now Tour	—	—	
October 26	Twenty One Pilots	AWOLNATION; Max Frost	The Bandito Tour	—	—	
November 6	Elton John	—N/a	Farewell Yellow Brick Road	14,073 / 14,073	$2,047,084	
November 9	Josh Groban	Idina Menzel	Bridges Tour	—	—	
December 9	Mumford & Sons	Cat Power	Delta Tour	—	—	

2019

Concerts at TD Garden
Date(s)	Headliner(s)	Supporting act(s)	Event / Tour	Attendance	Revenue	Ref.
February 1	Eric Church	—N/a	Double Down Tour	—	—	
February 2	Eric Church	—N/a	Double Down Tour	—	—	
March 8	Kelly Clarkson	Brynn Cartelli; Kelsea Ballerini	Meaning of Life Tour	11,687 / 11,687	$1,011,390	
March 20	Ariana Grande	Normani; Social House	Sweetener World Tour	13,125 / 13,125	$1,670,045	
March 26	Kiss	David Garibaldi	End of the Road World Tour	16,843 / 16,843	$1,569,234	
March 31	Fleetwood Mac	—	An Evening with Fleetwood Mac	—	—	
April 10	Muse	Walk the Moon	Simulation Theory World Tour	10,067 / 12,036	$827,792	
April 28	Cher	Nile Rodgers; Chic	Here We Go Again Tour	13,192 / 13,192	$1,786,640	
June 22	Ariana Grande	Normani; Social House	Sweetener World Tour	13,242 / 13,242	$1,628,077	
August 10	Khalid	Clairo	Free Spirit World Tour	12,845 / 12,845	$924,613	
August 14	Backstreet Boys	Baylee Littrell	DNA World Tour	13,075 / 13,442	$1,265,642	
August 15	Shawn Mendes	Alessia Cara	Shawn Mendes: The Tour	24,948 / 24,948	$1,875,446	
August 16	Shawn Mendes	Alessia Cara	Shawn Mendes: The Tour	24,948 / 24,948	$1,875,446	
August 17	Jonas Brothers	Bebe Rexha; Jordan McGraw	Happiness Begins Tour	13,587 / 13,587	$1,831,061	
September 27	The Chainsmokers	Lennon Stella; 5 Seconds of Summer	World War Joy Tour	—	—	
October 8	Post Malone	Swae Lee; Tyla Yaweh	Runaway Tour	26,437 / 26,437	$3,421,341	
October 9	Post Malone	Swae Lee; Tyla Yaweh	Runaway Tour	26,437 / 26,437	$3,421,341	
October 10	Carrie Underwood	Maddie & Tae; Runaway Tour	Cry Pretty Tour 360	15,692 / 15,692	$1,263,644	
October 11	The Black Keys	Modest Mouse; Jessy Wilson	Let's Rock Tour	—	—	
November 14	Tool	Killing Joke	Fear Inoculum Tour	—	—	
November 15	Elton John	Nile Rodgers; Chic	Farewell Yellow Brick Road	14,112 / 14,112	$2,046,734	
November 24	Jonas Brothers	Bebe Rexha; Jordan McGraw	Happiness Begins Tour	14,944 / 14,961	$1,831,948	
December 8	Cher	Nile Rodgers; Chic	Here We Go Again Tour	11,511 / 11,511	$1,378,938	
December 13	Céline Dion	—N/a	Courage World Tour	24,661 / 24,661	$5,180,061	
December 14	Céline Dion	—N/a	Courage World Tour	24,661 / 24,661	$5,180,061	

== 2020s ==
2021

Concerts at TD Garden
Date(s)	Headliner(s)	Supporting act(s)	Event / Tour	Attendance	Revenue	Ref(s)
August 27	Eagles	—N/a	Hotel California 2020 Tour	19,290 / 20,108	$4,473,531	
August 28	Eagles	—N/a	Hotel California 2020 Tour	19,290 / 20,108	$4,473,531	
October 18	Michael Bublé	—N/a	An Evening with Michael Bublé			
October 23	Twenty One Pilots	Jay Joseph; Half Alive	Takeover Tour	—	—	
October 25	Harry Styles	Jenny Lewis	Love On Tour	16,743 / 16,743	$2,306,243	
December 2	Luke Combs	—N/a	What You See is What You Get Tour			
December 3	Luke Combs	—N/a	What You See is What You Get Tour			
December 11	Andrea Bocelli	—N/a	Believe Tour			
December 15	Genesis	—N/a	The Last Domino? Tour	21,746 / 21,746	$4,180,975	
December 16	Genesis	—N/a	The Last Domino? Tour	21,746 / 21,746	$4,180,975	

2022

Concerts at TD Garden
Date(s)	Headliner(s)	Supporting act(s)	Event / Tour	Attendance	Revenue	Ref(s)
January 14	Kane Brown	Chase Rice; Restless Road	Blessed & Free Tour	—	—	
January 27	Kacey Musgraves	King Princess; MUNA	Star-crossed: unveiled	10,639 / 11,486	$1,120,462	
February 18	Dua Lipa	Caroline Polachek; Lolo Zouai	Future Nostalgia Tour	13,941 / 13,941	$1,471,026	
February 19	Tool	The Acid Helps	Fear Inoculum Tour	—	—	
February 20	Billie Eilish	Dora Jar	Happier Than Ever, The World Tour	12,910 / 12,910	$1,620,969	
May 5	Elevation Worship; Steven Furtick	—N/a	Elevation Nights 2022	—	—	—
May 9	John Mayer	Alexander 23	Sob Rock Tour	—	—	
May 10	John Mayer	Alexander 23	Sob Rock Tour	—	—	
May 18	The Who	Amythyst Kiah	The Who Hits Back Tour	—	—	
June 4	Chris Tomlin; UNITED	—N/a	Tomlin UNITED Tour	—	—	—
June 25	Machine Gun Kelly	Trippie Redd; PVRIS	Mainstream Sellout Tour	11,689 / 11,689	$1,329,546	
July 12	Roger Waters	—N/a	This Is Not a Drill	15,679 / 15,679	$2,515,971	
July 15	New Kids On The Block	Salt-N-Pepa; Rick Astley; En Vogue	Mixtape Tour 2022	—	—	—
July 16	New Kids On The Block	Salt-N-Pepa; Rick Astley; En Vogue	Mixtape Tour 2022	—	—	—
August 4	Barry Manilow	Dave Koz	Manilow: Hits 2022	—	—	—
August 10	Kendrick Lamar	Baby Keem; Tanna Leone	The Big Steppers Tour	12,983 / 12,983	$1,911,584	
September 7	My Chemical Romance	Thursday; Badflower	Reunion Tour	—	—	
September 8	My Chemical Romance	Thursday; Badflower	Reunion Tour	—	—	
September 9	Karol G	Agudelo888	$trip Love Tour	—	—	—
September 10	Kid Cudi	Don Toliver; 070 Shake; Strick	To the Moon World Tour	—	—	
September 14	Florence & The Machine	Sam Fender	Dance Fever Tour	—	—	
September 15	Lil Durk	G Herbo; Toure; MillyZ	Dope Shows Summertime Series 2022	—	—	—
September 16	Eric Clapton	Jimmie Vaughan	–	—	—	—
September 17	Roxy Music	—N/a	Roxy Music 50th Anniversary Tour	—	—	—
September 23	Post Malone	Zack Bia	Twelve Carat Tour	12,331 / 12,331	$1,899,475	
September 28	Panic at the Disco	Marina; Jake Wesley Rogers	Viva Las Vengeance Tour	—	—	
September 30	Lizzo	Latto	The Special Tour	—	—	
October 3	The Killers	Johnny Marr	Pressure Machine Tour	—	—	
October 10 (Note: The show of October 10, 2022 for Post Malone's Twelve Carat Tour was initially scheduled for September 24, 2022, but was rescheduled due to a health issue.)	Post Malone	—N/a	Twelve Carat Tour	—	—	
October 11	Gorillaz	EarthGang	World Tour 2022	—	—	
October 16	The Smashing Pumpkins; Jane's Addiction	Poppy	Spirits on Fire Tour	—	—	
October 21	Brandi Carlile	Brittany Howard	Beyond These Silent Days Tour	—	—	—
December 10	Andrea Bocelli	—N/a	Live in Concert - December 2022	—	—	—

2023

Concerts at TD Garden
Date(s)	Headliner(s)	Supporting act(s)	Event / Tour	Attendance	Revenue	Ref(s)
January 27	Future	Babyface Ray; Doe Boy; EST Gee; Kodak Black; Rob49	Future and Friends: One Big Party Tour	—N/a	—N/a	
February 17	Carrie Underwood	Jimmie Allen	Denim & Rhinestones Tour	—N/a	—N/a	
March 20	Bruce Springsteen; E Street Band	—N/a	2023 Tour	17,033 / 17,033	$4,978,145	
May 21	blink-182	Turnstile; White Reaper	World Tour 2023/2024	TBD	TBD	
July 11	21 Savage; Drake	Zack Bia	It's All a Blur Tour	—N/a	—N/a	
July 12	21 Savage; Drake	Zack Bia	It's All a Blur Tour	—N/a	—N/a	
August 15	Jonas Brothers	Lawrence	Five Albums. One Night. The World Tour	TBD	TBD	
August 16	Jonas Brothers	Lawrence	Five Albums. One Night. The World Tour	TBD	TBD	
September 2	Lil Baby	GloRilla; Gloss Up; Hunxho; Rylo Rodriguez	I.O.U. Tour	TBD	TBD	
September 3	Arctic Monkeys	Fontaines D.C.	The Car Tour	TBD	TBD	
September 6	Duran Duran	Bastille; Chic	Future Past Tour	TBD	TBD	
September 9	Suicideboys	City Morgue; Freddie Dredd; Ghostemane; Ramirez; Sematary	Grey Day Tour	TBD	TBD	
October 7	Playboi Carti	Ken Carson; Destroy Lonely; Homixide Gang	Antagonist Tour	TBD	TBD	
October 18	Luis Miguel		Luis Miguel Tour 2023–24	12,324 / 12,324	$2,099,191	
October 31	Depeche Mode	DIIV	Memento Mori World Tour	12,655	$1,958,455	
December 11	Mariah Carey		Merry Christmas One and All!	13,062 / 13,062	$2,192,756	
December 22	Travis Scott	Teezo Touchdown	Circus Maximus Tour	31,583 / 32,423	$4,572,513	
December 23	Travis Scott	Teezo Touchdown	Circus Maximus Tour	31,583 / 32,423	$4,572,513	

2024

Concerts at TD Garden
Date(s)	Headliner(s)	Supporting act(s)	Event / Tour	Attendance	Revenue	Ref(s)
January 8 (Note: Madonna's "The Celebration Tour" concerts were originally scheduled for August 30 and 31, 2023, but were postponed to January 8 and 9, 2024 after Madonna was hospitalized due to a bacterial infection.)	Madonna	Stuart Price	The Celebration Tour	TBD	TBD	
January 9	Madonna	Stuart Price	The Celebration Tour	TBD	TBD	
January 12	Travis Scott	Sheck Wes	Circus Maximus Tour	15,832 / 16,219	$2,158,045	
April 1	Olivia Rodrigo	Chappell Roan	Guts World Tour	28,108 / 28,108	$4,789,154	
April 2	Olivia Rodrigo	Chappell Roan	Guts World Tour	28,108 / 28,108	$4,789,154	
April 4	AJR	Dean Lewis	The Maybe Man Tour			
April 8	Nicki Minaj	Monica	Pink Friday 2 World Tour	25,463 / 25,463	$3,802,582	
April 10	Nicki Minaj	Monica	Pink Friday 2 World Tour	25,463 / 25,463	$3,802,582	
April 17	Bad Bunny		Most Wanted Tour	15,621 / 15,621	$5,287,626	
June 7	Melanie Martinez	Beach Bunny; Sofia Isella	The Trilogy Tour	13,897 / 13,897	$1,334,171	
June 13	Feid		Ferxxocalipsis Tour 2024			
June 20	A Boogie wit da Hoodie		Better Off Alone Tour			
June 26	Chris Brown	Muni Long; Ayra Starr	11:11 Tour			
June 27	Jhené Aiko	Coi Leray; Tink; UMI; Kiana Ledé	The Magic Hour Tour			
June 28	Janet Jackson	Nelly	Together Again	TBA	TBA	
June 29	Justin Timberlake		The Forget Tomorrow World Tour			
June 30	Justin Timberlake		The Forget Tomorrow World Tour			
July 3	Aventura		Cerrando Ciclos Tour			
July 5	Aventura		Cerrando Ciclos Tour			
July 6	Aventura		Cerrando Ciclos Tour			
July 26	Xscape; SWV	Mya; Total; 702	Queens of R&B Tour			
August 2	Alan Jackson		Last Call: One More for the Road Tour			
August 3	AJR	mxmtoon	The Maybe Man Tour			
August 9	Phil Wickham; Brandon Lake	Hulvey	Summer Worship Nights 2024			
August 10	Missy Elliott	Ciara; Busta Rhymes; Timbaland	Out of this World - The Experience			
August 13	Future; Metro Boomin		We Trust You Tour			
August 23	Childish Gambino	WILLOW	The New World Tour			
August 27	Usher		Usher: Past Present Future			
August 28	Usher		Usher: Past Present Future			
August 31	Incubus	Coheed and Cambria				
September 4	Cigarettes After Sex		X's World Tour			
September 6	Kacey Musgraves	Father John Misty; Nickel Creek	Deeper Well World Tour			
September 7	Kacey Musgraves	Father John Misty; Nickel Creek	Deeper Well World Tour			
September 10	Weezer	The Flaming Lips; Dinosaur Jr.	Voyage to the Blue Planet Tour			
September 16	Hans Zimmer		Hans Zimmer Live			
September 17	Kygo	Sam Feldt; HAYLA	Kygo World Tour			
September 20	Twenty One Pilots	Balu Brigada	The Clancy World Tour			
September 21	Twenty One Pilots	Balu Brigada	The Clancy World Tour			
September 23	Jeff Lynne's ELO		The Over and Out Tour			
September 25	$uicideboy$	Denzel Curry; Pouya; HAARPER; Shakewell; Ekkstacy	Grey Day Tour 2024			
September 26	Jelly Roll	Warren Zeiders; Alexandra Kay	Beautifully Broken Tour			
September 27	Vampire Weekend		Only God Was Above Us Tour			
September 28	Charli XCX; Troye Sivan	Shygirl	Sweat			
October 3	Sabrina Carpenter	Amaarae	Short n' Sweet Tour			
October 11	Billie Eilish	Nat Wolff; Alex Wolff	Hit Me Hard and Soft: The Tour			
October 17	Maggie Rogers	The Japanese House; Ryan Beatty	Dont Forget Me Tour Pt II			
October 31	Little Big Town	Sugarland; The Castellows	Take Me Home Tour			
November 10	MercyMe; TobyMac					
November 13	Chayanne		Bailemos Otra Vez Tour			
December 8	Shakira	TBA	Las Mujeres Ya No Lloran World Tour	TBA	TBA	
December 14	Andrea Bocelli		30th Anniversary Tour			

2025

Concerts at TD Garden
Date(s)	Headliner(s)	Supporting act(s)	Event / Tour	Attendance	Revenue	Ref(s)
February 13	Kelsea Ballerini	Maisie Peters; MaRynn Taylor	Kelsea Ballerini - Live On Tour			
March 7	Blake Shelton; Craig Morgan; Deana Carter	Trace Adkins	Friends and Heroes			
March 14	Disturbed	Three Days Grace; Sevendust	The Sickness 25th Anniversary Tour			
March 19	Dermot Kennedy	Nell Mescal; The Swell Season; Ye Vagabonds	MISNEACH Festival			
April 8	Deftones	The Mars Volta; Fleshwater	2025 North American Tour			
April 9	Kylie Minogue	Romy	Tension Tour			
April 14	Mary J. Blige	Ne-Yo; Mario	The For My Fans Tour			
May 17	Rauw Alejandro		Cosa Nuestra World Tour			
May 28	Barry Manilow		MANILOW: The Last Boston Concert			
July 8 & 9	Tyler, The Creator	Lil Yachty; Paris Texas	Chromakopia: The World Tour			
July 11	Wu-Tang Clan	Run The Jewels	Wu-Tang Forever: The Final Chapter			
July 19	Shinedown	Bush; Morgan Wade	Dance, Kid, Dance Tour			
July 21	Ghost		Skeletour World Tour 2025			
July 23 & 24	Gracie Abrams	Role Model	The Secret Of Us Deluxe Tour			
July 31 & August 1	Linkin Park	Pvris	From Zero World Tour			
August 8	Katy Perry	Rebecca Black	The Lifetimes Tour			
August 12	Stevie Nicks		Stevie Nicks: Live in Concert			
August 26 & 27	Tate McRae	Zara Larsson	Miss Possessive Tour			
August 29	Nine Inch Nails	Boys Noize	Peel It Back Tour			
September 2	Benson Boone		American Heart World Tour			
September 9 & 10	Dua Lipa		Radical Optimism Tour			
September 16	Eric Clapton	The Wallflowers				
September 17	Hans Zimmer		The World of Hans Zimmer			
September 19	Eric Church	Elle King	Free The Machine Tour			
September 20	Mt. Joy		Live in Boston			
September 26	Lorde	Blood Orange	Ultrasound Tour			
October 10	MANÁ		Vivir Sin Aire Tour			
October 17	Tate McRae	Alessi Rose	Miss Possessive Tour			
October 26	Bryan Adams	Pat Benatar; Neil Giraldo	Roll With The Punches Tour			
December 11	Andrea Bocelli		Andrea Bocelli in Concert			

2026

Concerts at TD Garden
Date(s)	Headliner(s)	Supporting act(s)	Event / Tour	Attendance	Revenue	Ref(s)
February 12	Brandi Carlile	The Head and the Heart	Human Tour			
February 13	Nine Inch Nails	Boys Noize	Peel It Back Tour			
February 25	Conan Gray	Esha Tewari	Wishbone World Tour			
March 5	Bailey Zimmerman	Hudson Westbrook; Blake Whiten	Different Night Same Rodeo Tour			
March 11	Bad Omens	Beartooth; President	Do You Feel Love Tour			
March 29	Lady Gaga		The Mayhem Ball			
March 30	Lady Gaga		The Mayhem Ball			
April 2	Cardi B		Little Miss Drama Tour			
April 3	Twice		This Is For World Tour			
April 4	Twice		This Is For World Tour			
April 19	Florence + The Machine	Sofia Isella	Everybody Scream Tour			
April 22	Demi Lovato	Adéla	It's Not That Deep Tour			
May 24	Bruce Springsteen; E Street Band		Land of Hope and Dreams American Tour			
May 30	Don Toliver	SahBabii; SoFaygo; Chase B	Octane World Tour			
June 5	5 Seconds Of Summer	The Band Camino	Everyone's a Star! World Tour			
June 11	Rosalía		Lux Tour			
June 25	Joji	nate sib Corbin	Solaris Tour			
July 6	Megan Moroney	JP Saxe; Solon Holt	The Cloud 9 Tour			
July 7	Megan Moroney	JP Saxe; Solon Holt	The Cloud 9 Tour			
July 8	Lionel Richie	Earth, Wind & Fire	Sing a Song All Night Long Tour			
July 10	Shakira		Las Mujeres Ya No Lloran World Tour			
July 11	Shakira		Las Mujeres Ya No Lloran World Tour			
July 13	Alex Warren	Noah Cyrus	Finding Family on the Road			
July 14	Louis Tomlinson	The Beaches; Picture Parlour	How Did We Get Here? World Tour			
July 15	Benson Boone	Olivia O'Brien	Wanted Man Tour			
July 18	"Weird Al" Yankovic	Puddles Pity Party	Bigger & Weirder Tour			
July 21	Melanie Martinez	Haute and Freddy	Hades: The Sacrifice			
July 23	Ariana Grande		The Eternal Sunshine Tour			
July 25	Ariana Grande		The Eternal Sunshine Tour			
July 26	Ariana Grande		The Eternal Sunshine Tour			
July 28	Tame Impala	Djo	Deadbeat Tour			
July 29	Tame Impala	Djo	Deadbeat Tour			
August 10	Olivia Dean	Baby Rose	The Art of Loving Live			
August 28	Kacey Musgraves	Midland	Middle of Nowhere Tour			
September 5	Don Toliver		Octane World Tour			
September 9	Iron Maiden	Megadeth	Run For Your Lives World Tour			
September 12	Rush		Fifty Something Tour			
September 14	Rush		Fifty Something Tour			
September 24	Charli XCX	Underscores	Music, Fashion, Film Tour			
September 27	Weezer	The Shins; Silversun Pickups	The Gathering Tour			
October 1	Gorillaz	Little Simz; Deltron 3030	The Mountain Tour			
October 3	beabadoobee	wisp	The Powerlines Tour			
October 6	Phoebe Bridgers	Alex G	The Lost Tour			
October 7	Phoebe Bridgers	Alex G	The Lost Tour			
October 9	Teddy Swims	St. Paul & The Broken Bones	The Ugly Tour			
October 15	Olivia Rodrigo	Wolf Alice	The Unraveled Tour			
October 17	Olivia Rodrigo	Wolf Alice	The Unraveled Tour			
October 18	Olivia Rodrigo	Wolf Alice	The Unraveled Tour			
October 28	Katseye		The Wildworld Tour			
November 18	sombr	Hannah Jadagu; Dove Cameron	You Are the Reason Tour			
November 23	Doja Cat	Latto	Tour Ma Vie World Tour			
