= TD Garden =

Multi-purpose arena in Boston, MA

- The Garden

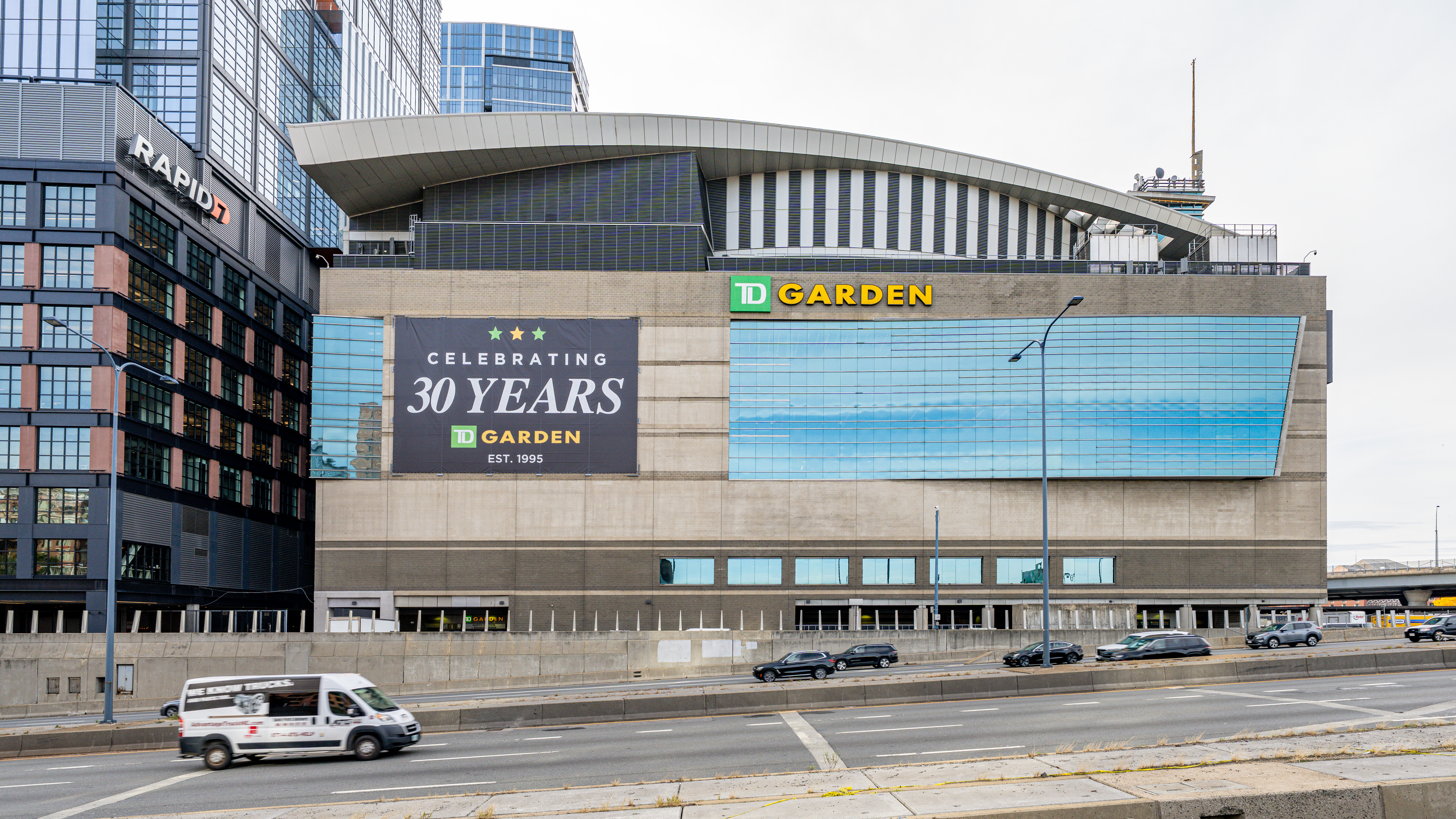
- TD Garden in November 2025

- Location in Boston Location in Massachusetts Location in the United States
- Former names: Shawmut Center (during construction); FleetCenter (1995–2005); TD Banknorth Garden (2005–2009)
- Address: 100 Legends Way
- Location: Boston, Massachusetts, U.S.
- Coordinates: 42°21′59″N 71°3′44″W
- Owner: Delaware North Companies
- Operator: Delaware North
- Capacity: Basketball: 18,624 (1995–2019) 19,156 (2019–present); Concerts: 20,000; Ice hockey: 17,565 (1995–2019) 17,193 (2019) 17,850 (2019–present)
- Surface: Various
- Public transit: Amtrak: Downeaster MBTA: Green Line; Orange Line; Fitchburg Line; Haverhill Line; Lowell Line; Newburyport/Rockport Line at North Station

Construction
- Groundbreaking: April 29, 1993
- Opened: September 30, 1995
- Renovated: 2006, 2009, 2014, 2019
- Cost: US$160 million; ($338 million in 2025 dollars)
- Architects: Ellerbe Becket, Inc.
- Project managers: Upton & Partners
- Structural engineer: LeMessurier Consultants
- Services engineer: Flack + Kurtz
- General contractor: Morse Diesel International

Tenants
- Boston Bruins (NHL) 1995–present; Boston Celtics (NBA) 1995–present; Boston Blazers (MILL) 1996–1997; Boston Blazers (NLL) 2009–2011

Website
- tdgarden.com

TD Garden is a multi-purpose arena in Boston, Massachusetts. It is located directly above the MBTA's North Station, and it replaced the original Boston Garden upon opening in 1995. It is the most visited sports and entertainment arena in New England, with nearly 3.5 million people visiting the arena each year.

TD Garden is the home arena for the Boston Bruins of the National Hockey League (NHL) and the Boston Celtics of the National Basketball Association (NBA). It is owned by food service and hospitality conglomerate Delaware North, whose CEO Jeremy Jacobs also owns the Bruins. It is the site of the annual Beanpot college hockey tournament, and hosts the annual Hockey East Championships. The arena has hosted many major national sporting events including various rounds of the NCAA Division I men's basketball tournament, NCAA Division I women's basketball tournament, NCAA Division I Men's Ice Hockey Tournament, the 2014 United States Figure Skating Championships, and the 2016 World Figure Skating Championships. In addition, TD Garden hosted the 2021 Laver Cup, an international men's tennis tournament.

Besides sporting events, TD Garden also serves as a concert venue for numerous nationally touring acts in music and comedy. The naming rights deal for the arena is scheduled to continue through June 2045, with TD Bank and Delaware North extending the agreement in January 2023.

== History ==
=== Planning ===
As early as the late 1970s, the Bruins were looking for a new arena. The Boston Garden was nearly 50 years old at the time. The Jacobs family, who had bought the Bruins in 1975, was looking to build a 17,000-seat arena in suburban Boston after negotiations fell through with the city of Boston. The team nearly moved to Salem, New Hampshire, around where the Mall at Rockingham Park is today. That fell through and the Bruins continued to play at Boston Garden. The Celtics, also looking for a new arena, considered moving to Revere, Massachusetts, adjacent to Boston.

In 1985, Boston Garden owner Delaware North was awarded the rights to construct a new arena by the Boston Redevelopment Authority and Mayor Raymond Flynn. However, poor economic conditions delayed the project.

On May 8, 1992, Delaware North announced that it had secured funding for a new arena in the form of $120 million worth of loans evenly split between Bank of Boston, Fleet Bank of Massachusetts and Shawmut National Corporation. That December, a bill approving construction of the new arena was killed in the Massachusetts Senate by Senate President William M. Bulger. Legislative leaders and Delaware North attempted to reach an agreement on plans for the new arena, but in February 1993, Bruins owner Jeremy Jacobs announced that he was backing out of the project as a result of the legislature's demand that his company pay $3.5 million in "linkage payments". Massachusetts governor Bill Weld lent strong support to a "Chapter 15" piece of legislation that included a "Section 7" that explicitly required Delaware North to "administer, produce, promote and sponsor no less than three charitable events per year at the New Boston Garden" and pay the proceeds from such events to the Metropolitan District Commission (MDC), today known as the state's Department of Conservation and Recreation. Two weeks later, after a new series of negotiations, the two sides finally came to an agreement, and on February 26, the legislature passed a bill that allowed for construction of a new arena.

=== Construction ===
Construction began on April 29, 1993. Although the new arena was intended to be situated slightly north of the old facility, there were only nine inches (23 cm) of space between the two buildings when construction was completed. The site for the new arena occupied 3.2 acres (13,000 m^{2}) and eventually cost $160 million. Construction was completed in 27 months, including seven weeks of delay caused by heavy snowfall.

=== Opening ===
On the evening of September 29, 1995, a farewell event was held in the old Boston Garden hosted by WBZ-TV news personality Liz Walker and CBS Evening News anchor Dan Rather. Bobby Orr and Phil Esposito, Bruins legends, as well as Celtics greats Larry Bird and Red Auerbach attended. The ceremony concluded with the release of thousands of balloons into the rafters to the music of the Boston Pops. The Boston Globe said that "all New England has lost a friend".

The next night, opening ceremonies were held at the FleetCenter including performances by the Boston Pops, Walt Disney's World on Ice, Olympic figure skaters Nancy Kerrigan and Paul Wylie, and musical acts James Taylor, Patti LaBelle, and US3. The Boston Bruins played their first game in the new arena on October 7, a 4–4 tie with the New York Islanders. The Boston Celtics lost their first game at the FleetCenter by a score of 101–100 to the Milwaukee Bucks on November 3.

=== Naming ===
TD Garden is named after its sponsor, TD Bank, a subsidiary of Canada's Toronto-Dominion Bank. During the construction phase, the naming rights to the "New Garden" were sold to Boston-based Shawmut Bank, and the arena was originally slated to open as the Shawmut Center. However, just as the arena was being completed, Shawmut merged with Fleet Financial Group, forcing every seat in the arena, which had all been stamped with the Shawmut logo, to be replaced. The interior color scheme also had to be adjusted from Shawmut's darker blue to Fleet's marginally lighter blue.

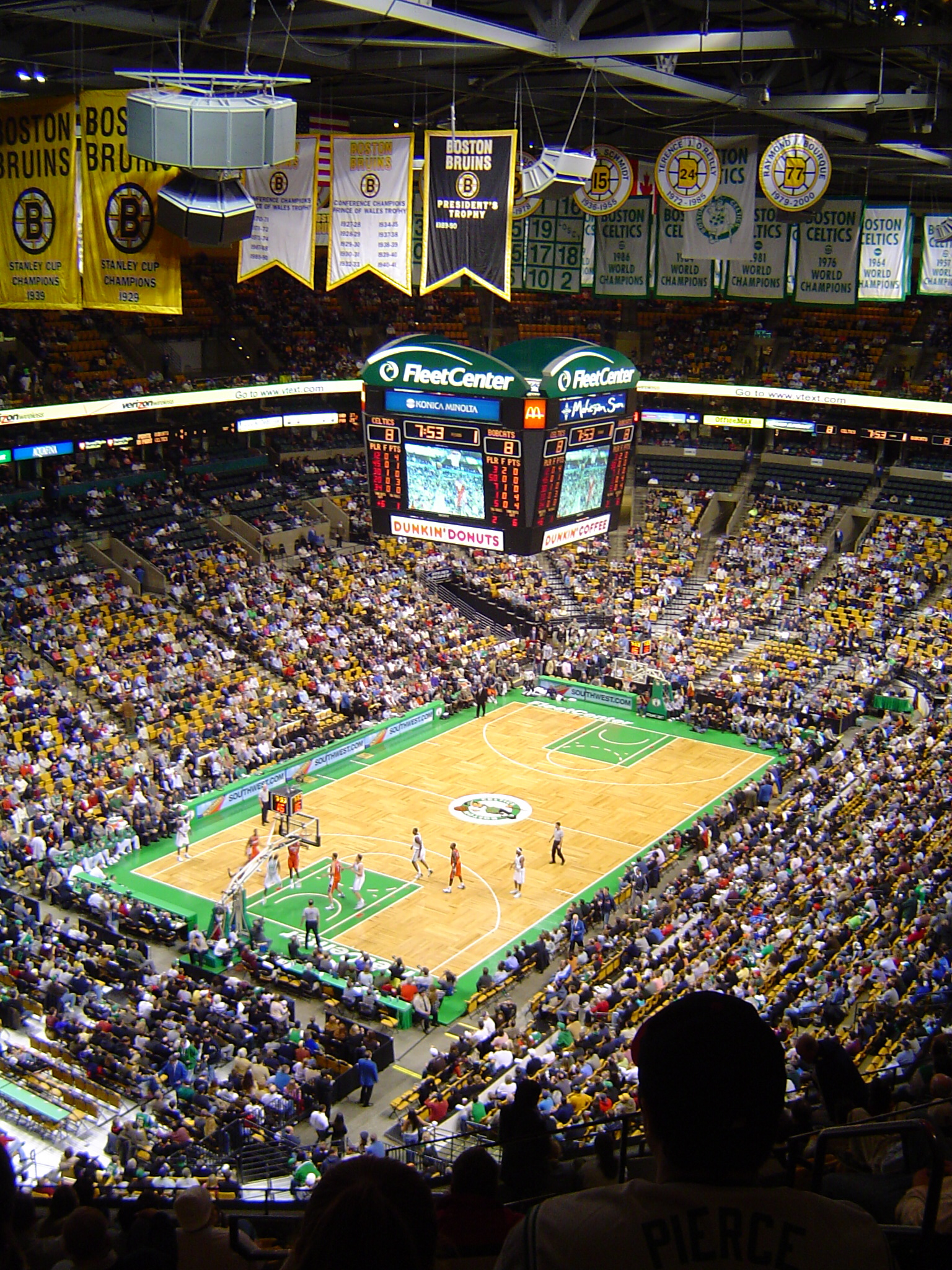
November 2004 Celtics game vs the Charlotte Bobcats at the then-FleetCenter

The name of the arena was expected to change as a result of the April 1, 2004, merger of FleetBoston Financial with Bank of America. On January 5, 2005, Delaware North announced an agreement under which the bank made a payment to be released from the remaining six years on the naming rights agreement. The agreement left Delaware North free to sell the naming rights to another sponsor. On March 3, 2005, Maine-based TD Banknorth, a U.S. subsidiary of Toronto-Dominion Bank, announced its purchase of the naming rights for $6 million per year. The first major event to be held after the announcement was the 2005 Hockey East Men's Ice Hockey Tournament. On July 1, 2005, the facility was officially renamed the TD Banknorth Garden. Bill Ryan, the chairman and CEO of TD Banknorth and a passionate booster of Boston sports, had specifically pursued the naming rights for TD Banknorth to restore the "Garden" monicker to the North Station edifice.

In early 2005, while still searching for a long-term corporate sponsor, the FleetCenter conducted auctions on eBay to sell one-day naming rights. From February 10 to March 13, the FleetCenter sold the naming rights 30 different times. The net proceeds of $150,633.22 generated during the auction were donated to charities in the greater Boston area. The FleetCenter also made private arrangements with a few companies for one-day naming rights, and offered one-day rights in an employee raffle.

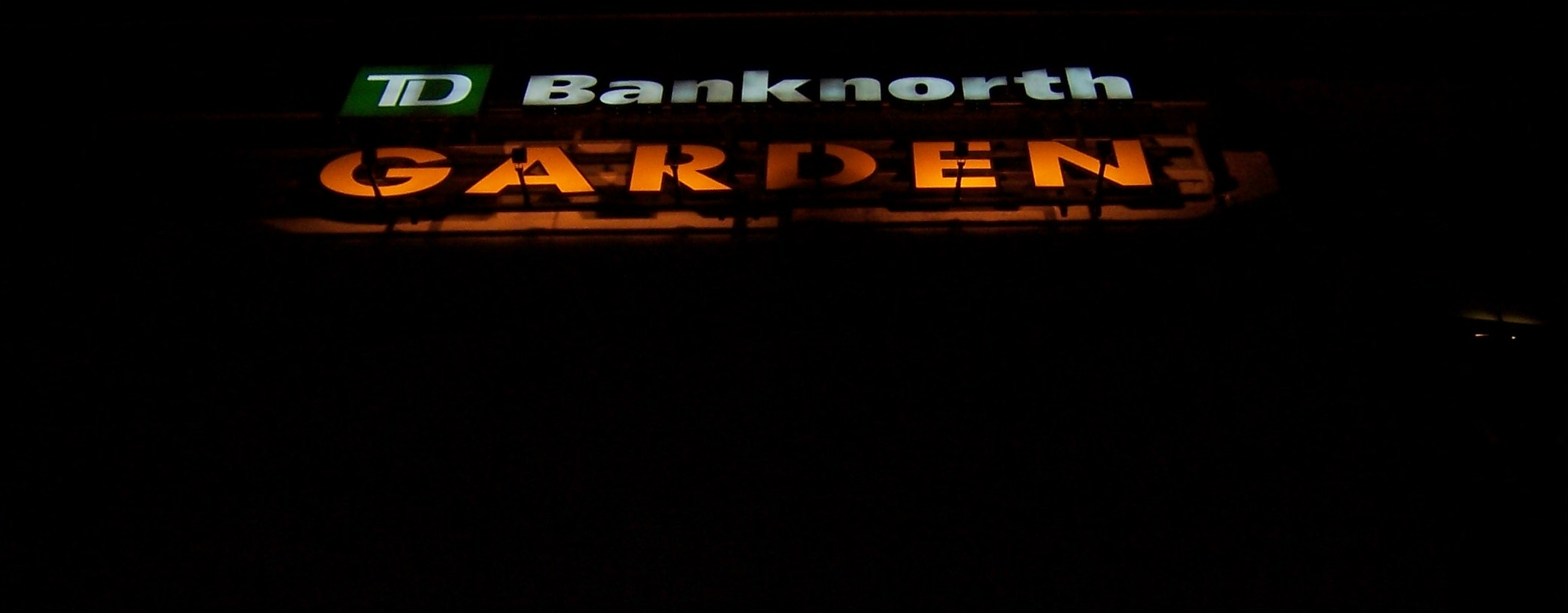
TD Banknorth Garden signage at night (2007)

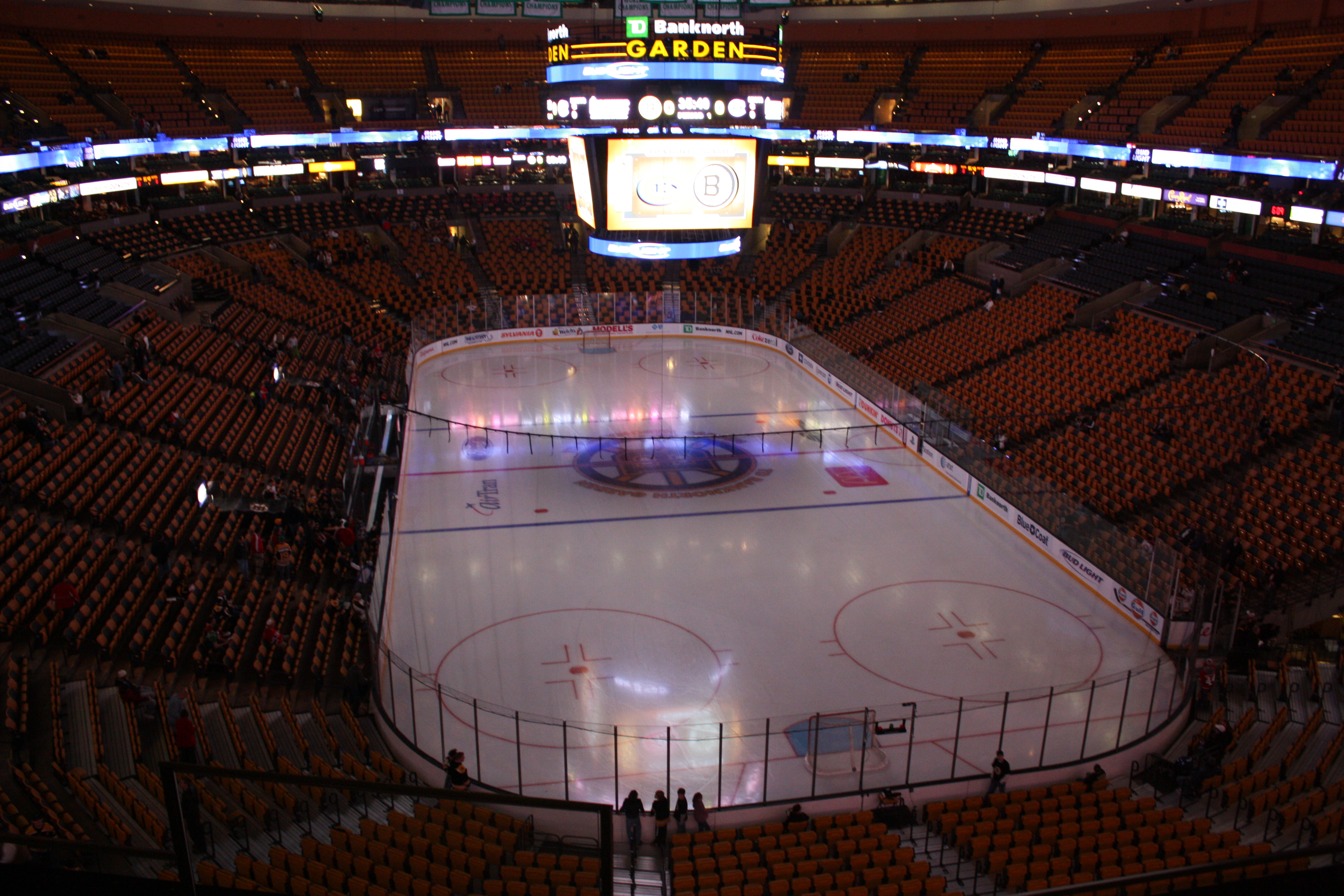
The Boston Bruins' hockey rink prior to a game vs the Montreal Canadiens in 2008 then TD Banknorth Garden

During the name auction, only twice were names reported to have been rejected. Kerry Konrad, a New York City lawyer and Yankees fan, won naming rights for March 1 with a bid of $2,300. He proposed the name "Derek Jeter Center" after the New York Yankees shortstop, a stab at fellow Harvard College alumnus and Boston Red Sox fan Jerry Rappaport Jr., with whom he had a 25-year-old rivalry. With the arena located in the home city of the Red Sox, the name did not sit well with the executives and was rejected. An agreement was reached in which Rappaport added $6,300 for a total bid of $8,600, representing the 86 years of the Curse of the Bambino, and named the arena "New Boston Garden, Home of the Jimmy Fund Champions". Fark.com founder Drew Curtis held a contest on his website to name the arena after he bought single-day rights. A user vote resulted in the name of "Fark.com UFIA Center", but the name was rejected because of its inappropriate meaning. The name eventually selected by Curtis and company was "Boston Garden".

In April 2008, TD Banknorth became TD Bank, after a merger with Commerce Bancorp, a New Jersey–based bank. Owner Delaware North Companies announced on April 15, 2009, that the building would be renamed TD Garden in July 2009.

Delaware North and TD Bank announced the extension of the naming rights deal on January 12, 2023, with the rights now extending until June 30, 2045, which would keep the arena's name stable for forty years. The same agreement also saw TD Bank extend their helmet advertising rights for the Bruins acquired at the start of the 2020–21 NHL season, until the end of the 2044–45 NHL season.

=== Renovations ===
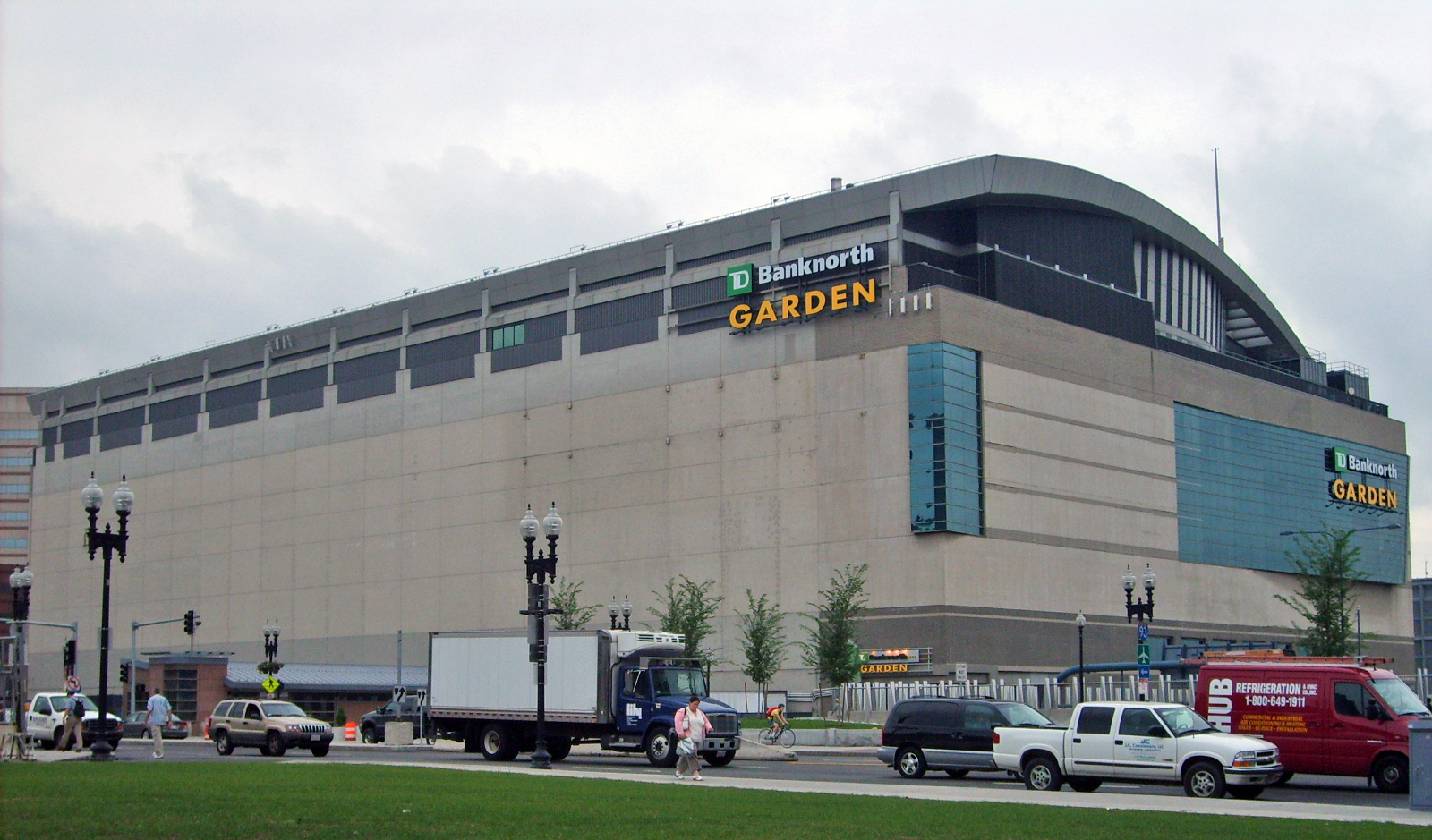
Then called TD Banknorth Garden, taken from new Rose Kennedy Greenway, June 2007

Before the 2006–07 season, the TD Garden underwent a major overhaul, installing a new HD entertainment board, with video panels replacing the sideboard scrolling panels when the arena hosted the 2006 Women's Final Four, and see-through shot clocks on the basket stancions, joining the FedExForum, Wells Fargo Center, State Farm Arena, Talking Stick Resort Arena, United Center, Rocket Arena, and the Spectrum (that was done before the NBA mandate was installed in 2011). In addition, a vintage siren, just as the original Boston Garden had used, was added to replace the end-of-period horn for hockey only, a feature of the Montreal Canadiens, the Bruins' arch-rivals, at the Montreal Forum (now the Pepsi Forum shopping centre) and the Centre Bell. In 2009, an LED energy efficient lighting system was added to the exterior of the building. The Boston Globe announced a $70 million project upgrade to TD Garden's concourses and Legends Club restaurant, along with technology upgrades and the relocation of a retail shop. Construction occurred in two phases, summer 2014 and then summer 2015.

On January 25, 2013, during a Celtics vs. Knicks game at the Garden, television announcer Marv Albert accused the TD Garden production crew for being one of those arenas that "constantly" use false sound effects and artificial crowd noise to intensify the crowd reactions on nationally televised games (which is very similar to "sweetening" on television); however, the official Twitter account of the Boston Celtics stated that the Celtics have never partaken in the practice. Following their 2011 Stanley Cup Final win, the Bruins changed their previous Stanley Cup banners to reflect the changes in the team's main jersey logo through time during their past five Cup wins, as the logo adorns the 2011 Cup win's banner. Just before the 2018–19 series of pre-season NHL games began for the Bruins at TD Garden, the arena's interior overhead lighting was switched to a new LED system which also includes color elements at appropriate times.

Before the 2021–22 NHL season, TD Garden underwent more renovations, adding a new center scoreboard/video screen, along with a new audio system. The new "Hub Vision" system is above 4K UHD resolution, and the main replay screen sizes are almost double of the old ones, at 18 feet by 32.5 feet wide. The unit also features auxiliary screens beneath to allow court/rinkside viewers to look at the board, which measure at 6.5 feet tall by 23 feet wide to cater to those sitting in the first few rows. Above the main boards, are 2 new ring displays. Each ring is 3.5 feet tall, and has a circumference of 179 feet. Hub Vision only has 2 rings above the main screens, unlike the old jumbotron with 2 at the top, and one at the bottom. TD Garden partnered with Clair Global Integration to add Cohesion Series CO10 loudspeakers to help improve the sound system.

This renovation was an extension of TD Garden's Legendary Transformation, which was a $100 million investment from the Jeremy Jacobs family.

== Use ==
Among the non-sporting events hosted by the Garden are concerts, shows, graduations, seminars, Disney on Ice, and the circus.

=== Sports ===
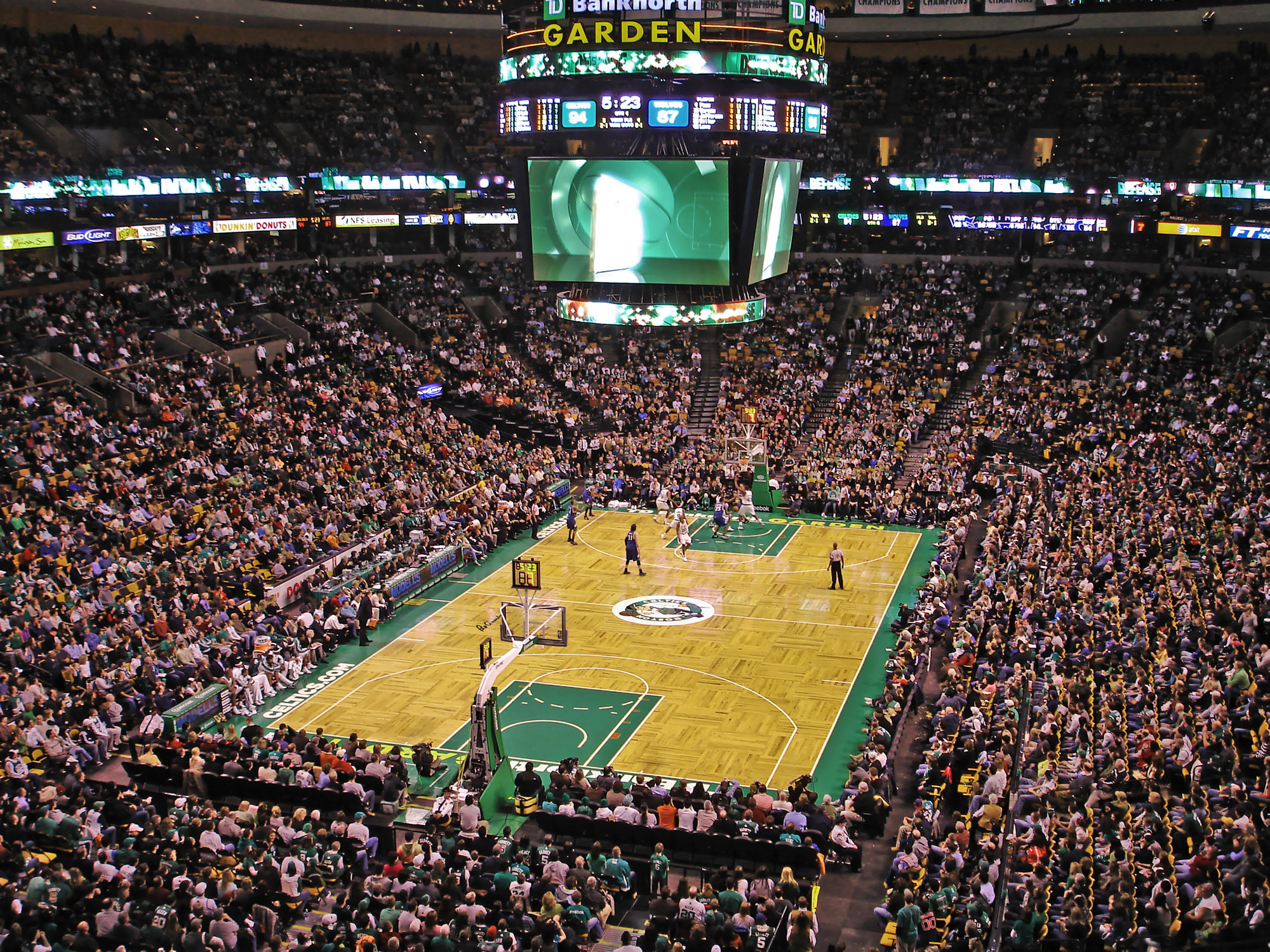
Celtics in a game vs the Minnesota Timberwolves at the then-TD Banknorth Garden (2009)

The arena is primarily the home venue for the NBA's Boston Celtics and the NHL's Boston Bruins. It has hosted the following events:

- NHL All-Star Game:
  - 1996: The Eastern Conference All-Stars defeated the Western Conference All-Stars 5–4. Bruins defenseman Ray Bourque won the game's most valuable player honors.
- NBA Finals:
  - 2008: On June 17, 2008, the Celtics defeated the Los Angeles Lakers 131–92 in game 6 at home to clinch the franchise's 17th NBA championship. It was their first championship since 1986.
  - 2010: The Celtics hosted games 3, 4 and 5 versus the Los Angeles Lakers. They eventually lost the series in seven games.
  - 2022: The Celtics hosted games 3, 4 and 6 versus the Golden State Warriors. The Warriors clinched the NBA championship in game 6, becoming the second visiting team to win the NBA championship in Boston after the Los Angeles Lakers accomplished this feat in 1985.
  - 2024: On June 17, 2024, the Celtics defeated the Dallas Mavericks 106–88 in game 5 at home to clinch the franchise's 18th championship.
- Stanley Cup Finals:
  - 2011: The Bruins hosted games 3, 4 and 6 versus the Vancouver Canucks. They eventually won the series in seven games.
  - 2013: The Bruins hosted games 3, 4 and 6 versus the Chicago Blackhawks. The Blackhawks clinched the Stanley Cup in Game 6, winning their second Cup in four seasons.
  - 2019: The Bruins hosted games 1, 2, 5 and 7 versus the St. Louis Blues. The Blues clinched the franchise's first Stanley Cup in Game 7.

While dominant in their previous arena, Boston Garden, the Celtics and Bruins were initially much less successful in their new home as both teams missed the playoffs numerous times and failed to make their league's finals until 2008. Since then, the Celtics made four NBA Finals appearances and won two championships, while the Bruins made three Stanley Cup Final appearances and won one championship.

Eddie Palladino is the public address announcer for Celtics games, while Jake Zimmer is the public address announcer for Bruins games. Jim Martin is the former PA announcer for the Bruins as he formerly served for them between 1992 and 2020. Ron Poster is the arena organist. As the former Boston Garden had from 1954 through 1995 - and the still-standing Matthews Arena had for its start in 1952 - the TD Garden is the home of the annual Beanpot college hockey tournament between the Boston University Terriers, Boston College Eagles, Harvard University Crimson and Northeastern University Huskies. The facility has hosted the 2001 U.S. Figure Skating Championships, the 1996 and 2000 US Gymnastics Trials, and the 1998, 2004, 2015 and 2022 NCAA Men's Frozen Four.

High school championships and tournaments for the Massachusetts Interscholastic Athletic Association are annually hosted at the TD Garden. Events include ice hockey and basketball championships. The Super 8 is one of the popular events that fans and students attend. The TD Garden, along with the Bell Centre in Montreal, was a host venue for the NHL 4 Nations Face-Off, an international ice hockey tournament featuring national teams representing the United States, Canada, Sweden and Finland, which was held from February 12 to 20, 2025.

Unlike most arenas, TD Garden did not install a goal horn for Bruins games. Instead, they use a recording of (since the 2007–08 season) a Kahlenberg KM-135 horn followed by playing Kernkraft 400 by Zombie Nation after home goals.

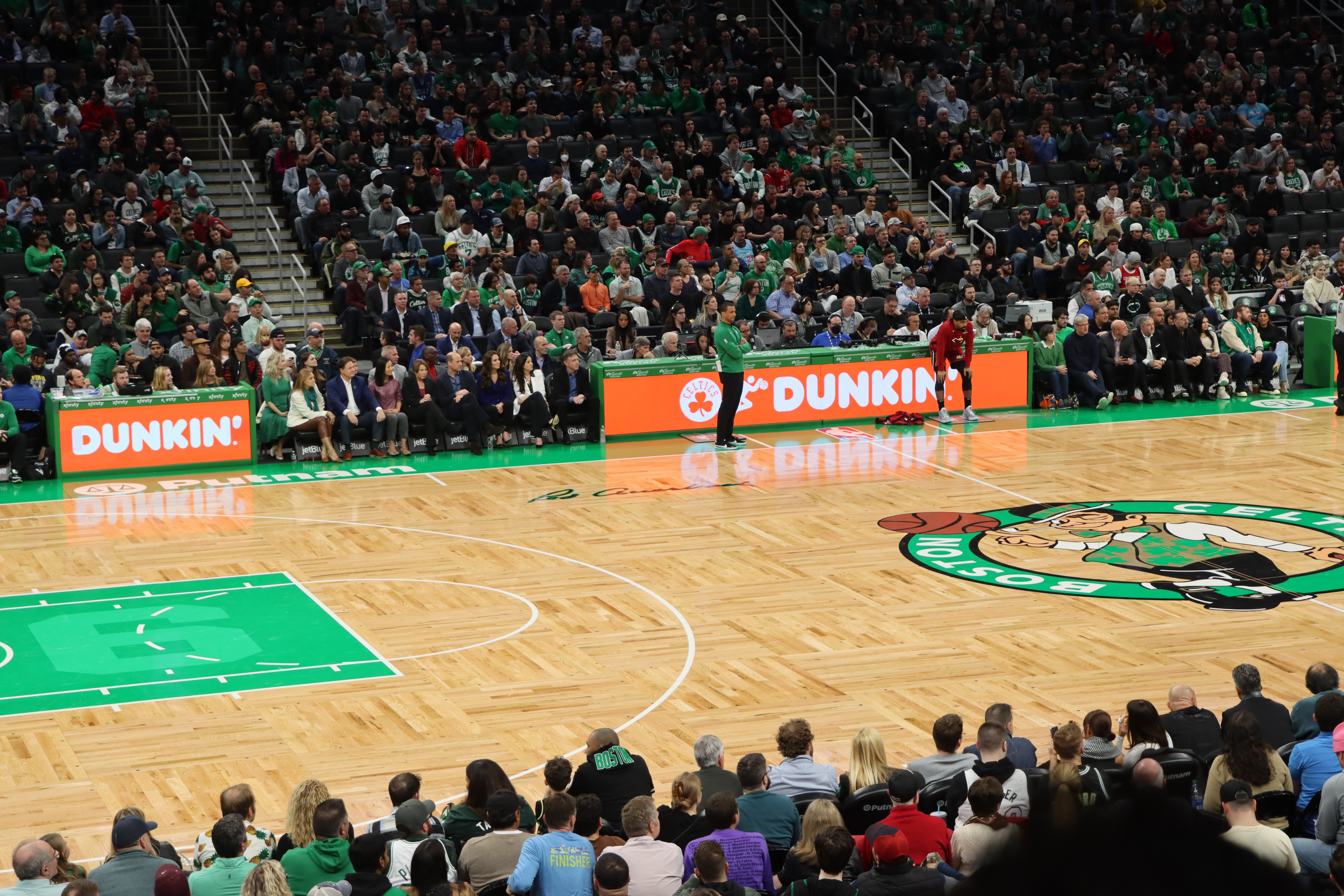
The Celtics added Red Auerbach's signature on the parquet floor in 2007, and in 2022, they memorialized Bill Russell by adding the No. 6 on the free throw lanes. Both have since moved below the Celtics logo at center court.

TD Garden is one of two NBA arenas (along with Kia Center, home of the Orlando Magic) with parquet floors. The Celtics are best known for the tradition of the parquet floor from their Boston Garden years, originally built after World War II because of cost and the scarcity of lumber in that time. The original floor, first used in Boston Arena and later the Boston Garden, was brought over to the then-FleetCenter and remained there for four seasons. A newly refurbished parquet floor, featuring a combination of old and new sections, was then unveiled during the 1999–2000 season, before it was replaced with a new floor prior to the 2015–16 season. Since the 2007–08 season, a signature of long-time Celtics coach Red Auerbach was added to the floor, and prior to the 2022–23 season, Bill Russell's jersey #6 was also added. The Celtics are also the only NBA team to use an oak floor, whereas the other 29 teams use maple floors. In 2023, the Celtics used an alternate court design specific for the NBA in-season tournament, which is a traditional maple floor painted mostly dark green except for the middle strip which is painted light brown. The free-throw lanes and center circle incorporated the NBA Cup trophy for the tournament. In subsequent NBA Cup home games, the court used was based on the team's "Statement" alternate uniform, now incorporating a green gradient painted surface inspired by the iconic parquet floor.

A traditional floor was used in the 2006 NCAA Women's Final Four, the 2009 NCAA Men's East Regional and the 2018 NCAA Men's East Regional (NCAA rules require a special NCAA-specification floor be used for all tournament games). While not yet confirmed, it is likely that the 2024 NCAA Men's East Regional will also use a traditional floor. When the 2012 NCAA Men's East Regional was held at TD Garden, a maple parquet floor was used with the same NCAA-specific design.

From March 28 to April 3, 2016, TD Garden hosted the 2016 World Figure Skating Championships. In 2021, TD Garden hosted the 2021 Laver Cup in September. The Laver Cup is a men's tennis tournament between teams from Europe and the rest of the world. It was held from 24 through 25 September with Team Europe winning the tournament for the fourth consecutive year.

In June 2024, the Celtics won their NBA-record 18th championship at TD Garden, beating the Dallas Mavericks and celebrating on the home floor. TD Garden hosted its first WNBA game on August 20, 2024, when the Connecticut Sun played the Los Angeles Sparks. The WNBA returned to play at TD Garden on July 15, 2025, when the Connecticut Sun played the Indiana Fever.

The Professional Women's Hockey League (PWHL) played its first game at TD Garden on April 11, 2026, between the Boston Fleet and Montreal Victoire where the Victoire won 1–0 in front of 17,850 fans.

=== Boxing ===
Ricky Hatton began his "American dream" here on May 13, 2006, stepping up to welterweight to fight WBA world champion Luis Collazo.

=== Gymnastics ===
On November 13, 2016, the arena hosted the Kellogg's Tour of Gymnastics Champions.

=== Mixed martial arts ===
In August 2010, the TD Garden hosted UFC 118: Edgar vs. Penn 2, which was the first time that the UFC held an event in Boston. UFC president Dana White confirmed that the UFC would return to The Garden on August 17, 2013. The TD Garden hosted UFC Fight Night: Shogun vs. Sonnen, the launch of the new Fox Sports 1 cable channel, on August 17, 2013. This was the second UFC event to take place at the TD Garden. The UFC returned on January 18, 2015, for UFC Fight Night: McGregor vs. Siver, and again on January 17, 2016, for UFC Fight Night: Dillashaw vs. Cruz. On January 20, 2018, the TD Garden hosted UFC 220: Miocic vs. Ngannou. On October 18, 2019, the arena hosted UFC on ESPN: Reyes vs. Weidman. On August 19, 2023, the TD Garden hosted UFC 292: Sterling vs. O'Malley.

=== In film ===
The TD Garden has been seen/mentioned in The Town (2010), Knight and Day (2010), Zookeeper (2011), What's Your Number? (2011), Ted (2012) and other movies. Parts of the concert footage from the documentary film Celine: Through the Eyes of the World were filmed at TD Garden during Canadian singer Celine Dion’s 2008 shows of her Taking Chances World Tour.

=== Other events ===
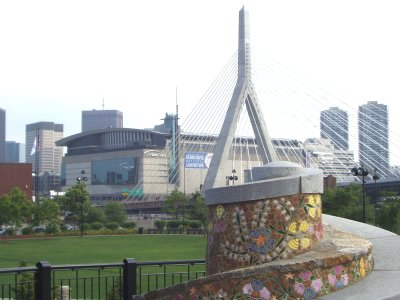
The FleetCenter (at the time the photo was taken) hosting the 2004 Democratic National Convention

Comedians including Bill Burr, Denis Leary, Chris Rock, and Louis C.K., among many others, have all performed at the TD Garden during their nationwide tours. Dane Cook did two sellout shows.

WWE professional wrestling events are held in the Garden, which frequently hosts its Raw and SmackDown shows. In addition, the arena has hosted several pay-per-views including WrestleMania XIV, Royal Rumble in 2003 and 2011, SummerSlam in 2006, Survivor Series in 2008, 2013 and 2022's Survivor Series: WarGames (Which introduced the WarGames match to WWE's main roster), Money in the Bank in 2014, TLC in 2015, Hell in a Cell in 2016, and Clash of Champions in 2017. In addition, rival promotion All Elite Wrestling (AEW) held their Blood & Guts and Royal Rampage special episodes of Dynamite and Rampage respectively at the Garden in 2023, as well as Big Business, another special episode of Dynamite, in 2024.

From July 26 to 29, 2004, the TD Garden (then the FleetCenter) was the host of the 2004 Democratic National Convention, in which Massachusetts Senator John Kerry was nominated as the Democratic candidate for the 2004 presidential election. The convention was also famous for then Senator and future President Barack Obama's keynote speech which began the speculation of his running for president in the 2008 presidential election.

== The Hub on Causeway ==
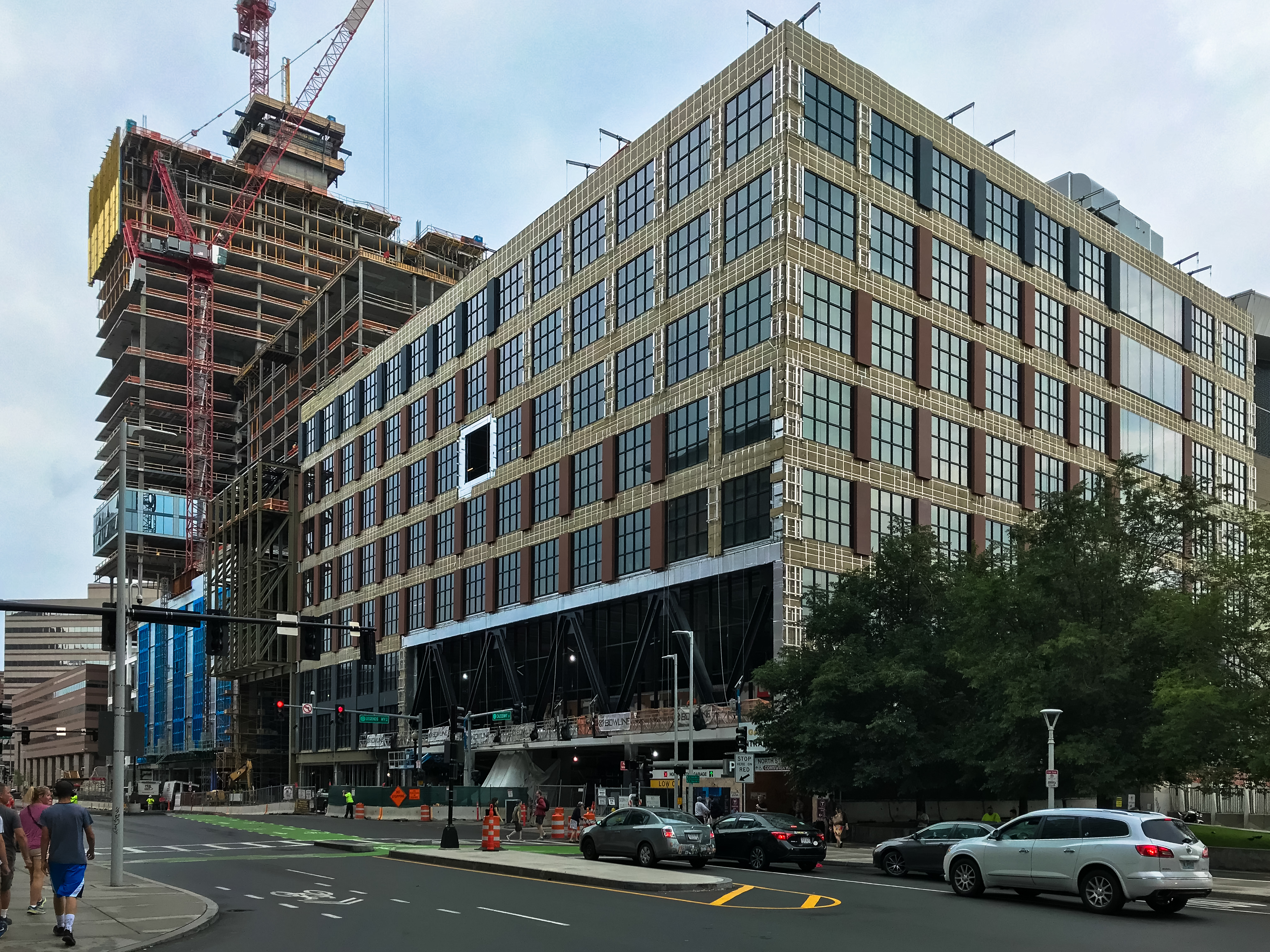
Hub on Causeway construction underway in August 2018

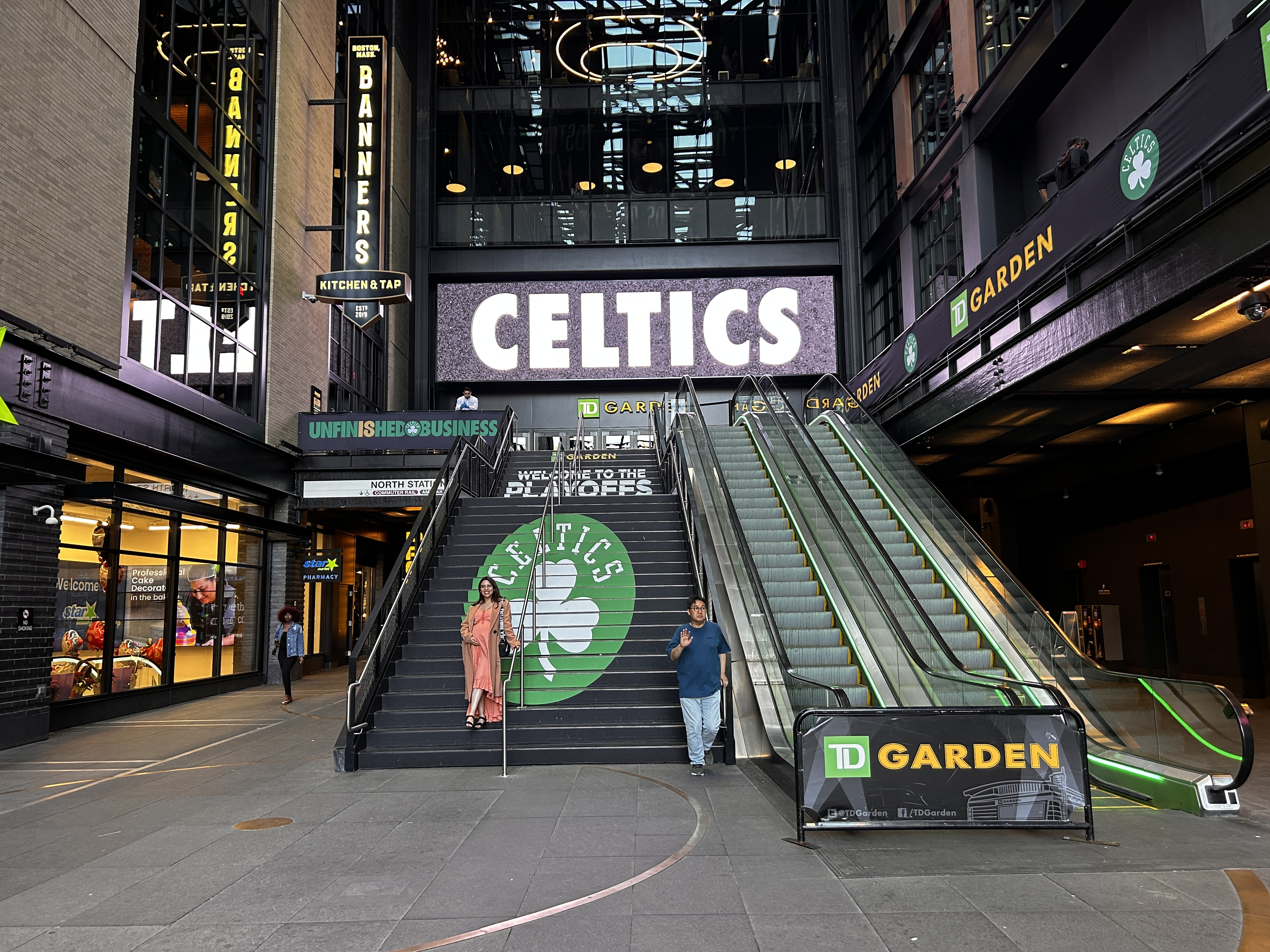
Arena entrance inside of the retail component of The Hub on Causeway

In May 2013, Delaware North Companies and Boston Properties proposed plans to construct a multi-purpose 3 tower structure on the former site of the original Boston Garden. The complex would encompass 1.87 million square feet (174,000 m^{2}), of which 300,000 square feet (28,000 m^{2}) will be allotted for retail space and 600,000 square feet (56,000 m^{2}) for commercial offices. It will also include 500 residential units, a 200-room hotel (CitizenM Boston North Station), and an 800-space underground parking garage. Construction began in late 2015. The project is being completed in three stages. The first stage is the podium that includes shopping, entertainment, dining, new access to the MBTA North Station Green Line and Orange Line, and a new entrance to the TD Garden and North Station. It also includes an expansion to the existing North Station Garage that sits underneath North Station and the TD Garden. The second phase includes two buildings built on top of the west side of the podium. One building will be apartments, the other a hotel. The third phase is an office building that will sit on top of the east side of the podium.

== Community fundraising controversy ==
In the spring of 2017, a group of local teenagers from the Hyde Square Task Force group investigated the terms of TD Garden's original development agreement, and concluded that its owners had never satisfied a legal requirement to host three fundraisers a year to benefit the agency that oversees Boston's recreational facilities. By mid-August 2017, the Massachusetts governor at the time of the TD Garden's original construction, Bill Weld, reminded Jeremy Jacobs about the deal he had made with the state's government in 1993 concerning the agreement. As a result, in August 2017, the TD Garden agreed to pay the Massachusetts Department of Conservation and Recreation nearly $2 million.

== Features ==
=== Statue ===
In May 2010, a bronze statue of Bruins defenseman Bobby Orr, in a flying pose celebrating "The Goal", was unveiled outside the stadium.

=== Museum ===
Located in TD Garden is The Sports Museum (also known as "The Sports Museum of New England"). The museum's exhibits focus on the history of various sports in the Boston area including the Boston Bruins, the Boston Celtics, the New England Patriots, the Boston Red Sox and many more.

== Facilities ==
2005 Hockey East Tournament; then the Fleet Center

Just as the Boston Garden was, the TD Garden is built on top of Boston's North Station, a major transportation hub. The Commuter Rail waiting area becomes crowded during events due to this design: the fans shared a relatively small area with commuters and several fast food concessions. (There is a concourse on the second floor which is about the same size as the former main ground floor concourse, but this is utilized only as an entryway for the arena.) Work finished on the expanded North Station concourse in early 2007. A new, larger, railway concourse gives railway passengers a waiting area which does not interfere with patrons entering or leaving the Garden.

Connections to the Orange Line and Green Line are near the eastern entrance to the Garden. On January 6, 2019, the North Station pedestrian tunnel was completed which connects North Station to the MBTA, Green and Orange Line Stations. The entrance is located by the North Station East entrance. The Green Line ran on the Causeway Street Elevated in front of the building until a tunnel under it was opened in June 2004. The then-disused Elevated was used as a platform for security forces during the 2004 Democratic National Convention, then demolished slightly afterwards.

== See also ==
- Matthews Arena, formerly Boston Arena, the Bruins' original home rink, built in 1910 and demolished in 2026
- List of indoor arenas by capacity
- List of indoor arenas in the United States

Events and tenants
Preceded by Boston Garden	Home of the Boston Bruins; 1995–present	Succeeded by current
Preceded by Boston Garden	Home of the Boston Celtics; 1995–present	Succeeded by current
Preceded by Madison Square Garden	Host of the NHL All-Star Game; 1996	Succeeded by San Jose Arena
Preceded by Bradley Center; Milwaukee	Host of the Frozen Four; 1998	Succeeded by Arrowhead Pond of Anaheim; Anaheim, California
Preceded by Rosemont Horizon	Host of WrestleMania; 1998	Succeeded by First Union Center
Preceded by Philips Arena	Home of the Royal Rumble; 2003	Succeeded by Wachovia Center
Preceded by HSBC Arena; Buffalo, New York	Host of the Frozen Four; 2004	Succeeded by Value City Arena; Columbus, Ohio
Preceded by Boston Garden	Home of the Boston Blazers; 1996–1997	Succeeded by None
Preceded by None	Home of the Boston Blazers; 2009–2011	Succeeded by None
