= Cold (BigXthaPlug song) =

2025 single by BigXthaPlug featuring Post Malone

Single by BigXthaPlug featuring Post Malone

from the album I Hope You're Happy
- Released: November 21, 2025
- Genre: Country trap
- Length: 3:08
- Label: UnitedMasters
- Songwriters: Xavier Landum; Austin Post; Jon Hume; Louis Bell; Krishon Gaines; Charles Forsberg; Jackson Nance; Joel Crouse; David Ray Stevens
- Producers: Hume; Bell; Bandplay; Charley Cooks

BigXthaPlug singles chronology
"Hell at Night" (2025)	"Cold" (2025)

Post Malone singles chronology
"Losers" (2025)	"Cold" (2025)

Music video
- "Cold" on YouTube

"Cold" is a song by American rapper BigXthaPlug featuring fellow American rapper and singer Post Malone. It was released on November 21, 2025 from the deluxe edition of the former's third studio album, I Hope You're Happy, as the lead single. The song was produced by Jon Hume, Louis Bell, Bandplay and Charley Cooks.

== Background ==
In an interview with Complex in December 2024, BigXthaPlug mentioned he was collaborating with Post Malone when announcing his country EP (which became I Hope You're Happy). Singer Ernest teased the collaboration on Instagram in February 2025 by sharing a photo of himself in the studio alongside the two artists. BigXthaPlug also appeared during the Detroit stop of Malone's Big Ass Stadium Tour, where he performed his song "Texas". In June 2025, he confirmed that they were working on new music together during an interview with Johnny Dang and Co. In August 2025, BigXthaPlug explained to Billboard News that his song with Malone was not yet ready for release as Malone was busy with his tour. During the third weekend of November 2025, the artists were spotted filming the song's music video.

== Composition and lyrics ==
"Cold" is a country trap song, with melodic trap and Southern hip-hop influences. Post Malone performs the chorus, in which he sings about having a "cold" heart and feeling lonely, while BigXthaPlug raps about a breakup that left him cold (in the same manner) and admits his own actions had prompted it.

== Critical reception ==
Tallie Spencer of HotNewHipHop gave a positive review, writing "Their chemistry lands naturally. BigX grounds the record with while Post adds the icy, melodic lift. "Cold" feels built for playlists and solo late-night drives, showing both artists in their most polished, confident form." Eric Diep of Dallas Observer commented "Malone delivers a hook perfect for sing-alongs in watering holes and honky tonks."

== Music video ==
The music video was released alongside the single. It finds the artists in the wilderness, hanging out on a ranch, and sitting around a campfire.

== Charts ==
=== Weekly charts ===
Weekly chart performance
Chart (2025–2026)	Peak position
Canada Hot 100 (Billboard)	73
CIS Airplay (TopHit)	24
Kazakhstan Airplay (TopHit)	8
New Zealand Hot Singles (RMNZ)	16
Russia Airplay (TopHit)	19
US Billboard Hot 100	82
US Hot Country Songs (Billboard)	19

=== Monthly charts ===
Monthly chart performance
Chart (2025–2026)	Peak position
CIS Airplay (TopHit)	27
Kazakhstan Airplay (TopHit)	13
Russia Airplay (TopHit)	21
