= Amar (album) =

2023 album by BigXthaPlug

Studio album by BigXthaPlug
- Released: February 10, 2023
- Genre: Southern hip-hop; trap
- Length: 34:04
- Label: UnitedMasters
- Producer: 88; Aimonmyneck; Baker Yung; BandPlay; Beezo; Ben Mari; Blazerfxme; Blondobeats; C Gutta; DonBeBumpin; Ephortless; FKAjazz; Flarryse; Hal Walker; Hollywood Cole; Luke Crowder; Nice Rec; RandyHitz; Rhyme Michaelson-Lara; ShoBeatz; Slizer; Tady Fletcher; Tony Coles; Trashbagg Beatz; Ziggymadeit

BigXthaPlug chronology
Big Stepper (2022)	Amar (2023)	The Biggest (2023)

Singles from Amar
- 1. "Rap Niggas" Released: May 20, 2022; 2. "Safehouse" Released: September 21, 2022; 3. "I Know" Released: October 14, 2022; 4. "Texas" Released: November 25, 2022; 5. "Primetime" Released: January 27, 2023

Amar is the debut studio album by American rapper BigXthaPlug, released on February 10, 2023 through UnitedMasters. Named after the rapper's son, it debuted at No. 4 on Billboard's Heatseekers charts. It was preceded by the singles "Rap Niggas", "Safehouse", "I Know", "Texas" and "Primetime". The album features guest appearances from Ro$ama, Sauce Walka, Tay Money and Erica Banks, while the production is handled by Tony Coles, BandPlay and among other producers. A deluxe edition of the album was released on April 28, 2023, with four additional tracks.

== Critical reception ==
Professional ratings
Review scores
Source	Rating
AllMusic	3.5/5 stars
HipHopDX	3.8/5
Pitchfork	7.0/10

The album received generally positive reviews from music critics. Hayley Tharp of Earmilk remarked, "BigXThaPlug is making a name for himself as a talented storyteller and fierce rapper. Amar proves he can deliver a full length project packed with cohesive beats and steady lyrical stamina. He is a hearty chicken soup for the trap lover's soul". Paul Simpson of AllMusic wrote that BigXthaPlug "instantly makes a major impression with his commanding tone and restless flows, as well as the unconventional samples and instrumentation accompanying the booming 808s he raps over" and his "personality is intense and dramatic, yet he seems cool-headed and has a playful, humorous side. The tracks are mostly on the short side, making AMAR feel closer to a mixtape than a proper album, but it clearly makes an impression, and BigX seems like a name to watch". Nadine Smith of HipHopDX stated, "Armed with a gruff, booming vocal register, his debut album AMAR exudes the kind of rich swagger and effortless charisma embodied by breakout Texas stars like Maxo Kream". Peter A. Berry of Pitchfork commented "There are some unexpected production flourishes here, but on the whole, Amar doesn't do much to elevate the rapper it's hosting. BigX is still figuring out how to help himself, too. Pairing a screenwriter's knack for harnessing histrionics with a freestyler's ability to stack intricate rhymes atop emphatic punchlines, he always knows how to deliver captivating individual verses. The next step is merging them with less predictable song structures and more memorable hooks (as is, they often feel like placeholders meant to bridge the gap between one verse and the next). But that's fine; after all, he's only dropped three projects. With his storytelling know-how and mic presence, BigXthaPlug is worth a re-up".

== Track listing ==
Amar track listing
No.	Title	Writer(s)	Producer(s)	Length
1.	"Switched Up"	Xavier Landum; Tony Anderson; Rashard McNeil; Khalid Monawar; Bishop Grinnage	Tony Coles; Beezo; Ephortless; Slizer	2:15
2.	"Rush Hour"	Landum; Rhyme Michaelson-Lara; Shinichi Osawa; Aadrian Hamilton	Michaelson-Lara; 88	2:33
3.	"Primetime"	Landum; Reginald Boyland; Charles Forsberg; Samir Zarif	TrashBagg Beatz; Charley Cooks; FKAjazz	3:33
4.	"Texas"	Landum; Vladislav Zabornikov; Miltiadis Partalis; Vladimir Vasilev; Shuggie Otis	Aimonmyneck; Blondobeats; Blazerfxme	2:26
5.	"Bad Bitches" (featuring Ro$ama)	Atupele Ndisale; Breonica Smith; Christopher Wood; David Patiño; Dominic Martin	ShoBeatz	2:25
6.	"Bacc to Tha Basics"	Landum; Kameron Cole; Peter Mudge	Hollywood Cole; Nice Rec	1:54
7.	"Safehouse"	Landum; Baker Yung; Ivan Tagle	Yung; Ben Mari	2:16
8.	"Change"	Landum; Donovan Wells; Angelo Bond; William Weatherspoon	DonBeBumpin	2:13
9.	"Badu Flow"	Landum; Anderson; Philip Clendennin; Erica Wright; James Yancey	Tony Coles	2:24
10.	"I Know" (featuring Sauce Walka)	Landum; Noel Brown; Albert Mondane	Ziggymadeit	3:17
11.	"Levels"	Landum; Anderson; Billy Smith	Tony Coles	2:37
12.	"Thick" (featuring Tay Money and Erica Banks)	Landum; Taylor Watson; Erica Breaux; Darwin Quinn; Luke Crowder; Calvin Tarvin	Crowder; C Gutta; Tiggi	3:16
13.	"Dream"	Landum; Anderson; Billie Calvin	Tony Coles	2:58
Total length:				34:07

Deluxe edition
No.	Title	Writer(s)	Producer(s)	Length
15.	"Whip It"	Landum; Krishon Gaines; Anderson; Reginald Andrews; Leon Chancellor	Bandplay; Tony Coles	2:17
16.	"Left Eye"	Landum; Anderson; Hal Walker	Tony Coles; Walker	2:02
17.	"Rap Niggas"	Landum; RoDarrion Harrison; Randy Obasuyi; Tony Anderson	RandyHitz	2:44
18.	"Ends"	Landum; DeShaun Williams; Zakharov Sergeyevich; Lagutyaev Vyachslavovich	Tady Fletcher; Flarryse	2:16
Total length:				43:26

== Charts ==
=== Weekly charts ===
Weekly chart performance for Amar
Chart (2023–2024)	Peak position
US Billboard 200	97
US Top R&B/Hip-Hop Albums (Billboard)	40

=== Year-end charts ===
2024 year-end chart performance for Amar
Chart (2024)	Position
US Billboard 200	125
US Top R&B/Hip-Hop Albums (Billboard)	49

2025 year-end chart performance for Amar
Chart (2025)	Position
US Billboard 200	176
US Top R&B/Hip-Hop Albums (Billboard)	80

== Certifications ==
Certifications for Amar
Region	Certification	Certified units/sales
United States (RIAA)	Platinum	1,000,000^{‡}
^{‡} Sales+streaming figures based on certification alone.
