= I Hope You're Happy (BigXthaPlug album) =

Studio album by BigXthaPlug
- Released: August 22, 2025
- Genre: Country rap
- Length: 26:04
- Label: UnitedMasters
- Producers: Aldae; BandPlay; Tony Coles; Charley Cook; Digital Farm Animals; Tony Esterly; James Gutch; Charlie Handsome; The Monsters & Strangerz; Xavier Landum; Stavros Tsarouhas; Uv Killin Em

BigXthaPlug chronology
Take Care (2024)	I Hope You're Happy (2025)

Singles from I Hope You're Happy
- 1. "All the Way" Released: April 4, 2025; 2. "Home" Released: June 27, 2025; 3. "Hell at Night" Released: August 8, 2025

I Hope You're Happy is the third studio album by American rapper BigXthaPlug, released on August 22, 2025, via UnitedMasters. The follow-up to his second album Take Care (2024), its production was primarily handled by BandPlay, alongside Tony Coles, Charley Cooks, Dave Cohen, and BigXthaPlug himself (under his real name, Xavier Landum), among others.

The record marks a stylistic pivot into country rap, blending hip-hop cadences with Nashville instrumentation. Featuring collaborations with Post Malone, Luke Combs, Jelly Roll, Shaboozey, Darius Rucker, Bailey Zimmerman, Ella Langley, Ink, Tucker Wetmore, and Thomas Rhett, the album explores themes of heartbreak, grief resilience, and self-reflection.

== Background and recording ==
BigXthaPlug, born Xavier Landum, had been experimenting with country influences since his 2022 breakout single "Texas", which combined slide guitar with Southern rap swagger. The track's success brought him recognition from country stars including Morgan Wallen, Luke Combs, and Post Malone.

At the start of 2025, BigXthaPlug hinted in a Billboard interview that a country music project was in the works, despite not having begun it at the time. "I go and do a Billboard interview and I straight up say, 'I got a country project on the way'", he later admitted. "And I never had a country project on the way...After I was like, 'Damn'". His team encouraged him to commit, and soon after, country artists such as Jelly Roll expressed interest in collaborating.

The project, originally titled Not Just Country, was developed over the course of eight months and became BigXthaPlug's longest recording process yet. It follows his 2024 album Take Care, which debuted at number eight on the Billboard 200 and contained the hits "Mmhmm" and "The Largest".

The album was officially announced in June 2025 during CMA Fest, where BigXthaPlug confirmed the track list and August 22 release date. He revealed the collaborations in July at Apple Music's Los Angeles studio.

The lead single, "All the Way" featuring Bailey Zimmerman, was released ahead of the album and debuted in the top five of the Billboard Hot 100. The follow-up single, "Home" featuring Shaboozey, gained additional attention after its music video shoot shut down a Dallas street.

== Themes ==
Thematically, the album centers on the emotional fallout of a failed relationship, with BigXthaPlug alternating between bitterness, regret, and gratitude. Collaborations with country artists bring distinct flavors: Darius Rucker lends a bluesy tone to the title track, Jelly Roll provides mournful vocals on "Box Me Up", Luke Combs delivers a booming chorus on "Pray Hard", and Ella Langley joins for the scathing break-up anthem "Hell at Night".

Musically, the record blends trap percussion with country guitar riffs and stadium-ready choruses. Rolling Stone described it as "a temperature check for where country is in the back half of 2025," citing the mix of brooding male vocalists and genre-bending production.

== Critical reception ==
Professional ratings
Review scores
Source	Rating
Rolling Stone	3/5 stars

Hope You're Happy received generally positive reviews from critics. Michael Saponara of Billboard praised BigXthaPlug's ability to merge hip-hop with country authenticity and highlighted tracks like "Pray Hard" and "Box Me Up" as standouts. Maura Johnston of Rolling Stone gave the album three out of five stars, noting its appeal to country listeners while commending the emotional nuance in songs such as "24/7" and "Hell at Night".

== Track listing ==
I Hope You're Happy track listing
No.	Title	Writer(s)	Producer(s)	Length
1.	"I Hope You're Happy" (featuring Darius Rucker)	Xavier Landum; Tony Anderson; Anderson East; Charles Forsberg; Krishon Gaines; Chris Stapleton	BandPlay; Tony Coles; Charley Cooks; Lee J. Turner^{[v]}	3:05
2.	"Gone (Interlude)"	Landum	Landum	0:41
3.	"Box Me Up" (featuring Jelly Roll)	Landum; Gregory Aldae Hein; Jason DeFord; James Gutch; Jordan K. Johnson; Stefan Johnson; Stavros Tsarouhas	Aldae; Gutch; The Monsters & Strangerz; Tsarouhas; S. Johnson^{[v]}	2:53
4.	"All the Way" (featuring Bailey Zimmerman)	Landum; Forsberg; Gaines; Ben Johnson; Jenna Johnson; KK Johnson	BandPlay; Cooks; Austin Shawn	2:46
5.	"Hell at Night" (featuring Ella Langley)	Landum; Langley; Rocky Block; Yuval Chain; Gaines; RoDarrion Harrison; Joybeth Taylor; Ryan Vojtesak	BandPlay; Charlie Handsome; Uv Killin Em; Austin Goodloe^{[v]}	2:59
6.	"Gift & a Curse (Interlude)"	Landum	Landum	0:41
7.	"Pray Hard" (featuring Luke Combs)	Landum; Combs; Dave Cohen; Gaines; Jon Hall; Nick Monson; Mark Nilan Jr.	BandPlay; Cohen^{[p]}; Coles^{[p]}; Monson^{[p]}; Nilan^{[p]}; Hall^{[v]}; Chip Matthews^{[v]}	2:06
8.	"Home" (featuring Shaboozey)	Landum; Collins Chibueze; Cohen; Sean Cook; Tony Esterly; Forsberg; Gaines; Scoot Teasley	BandPlay; Cohen; Cook; Cooks; Esterly	2:15
9.	"24/7" (featuring Ink)	Landum; Atia Boggs; Hank Compton; JT Daly; Gaines; Nick Gale; Harrison; Emily Weisband	BandPlay; Daly; Digital Farm Animals; Cohen^{[p]}	2:40
10.	"About You" (featuring Tucker Wetmore)	Landum; Cohen; Gaines; Jon Hume; Jackson Nance; David Stevens; Laura Veltz	BandPlay; Cohen^{[p]}; Hume^{[p]}	2:57
11.	"Long Nights" (featuring Thomas Rhett)	Landum; Jenna Andrews; Mike Ewing; Gaines; Stephen Kirk; Bryant Taylorr; Vojtesak	BandPlay; Handsome	3:01
Total length:				26:04

=== Notes ===
- ^{^[p]} denotes a primary and vocal producer.
- ^{^[v]} denotes a vocal producer.

== Personnel ==
Credits adapted from Tidal.

=== Musicians ===
- BigXthaPlug – vocals
- Charley Cooks – guitar (tracks 1, 2)
- Dave Cohen – keyboards (1, 9, 11); arrangement, electric guitar, piano, programming (7); organ (10)
- Aldae – drums, guitar, keyboards, backing vocals, programming (3)
- Stavros Tsarouhas – drums, guitar, keyboards, programming, strings (3)
- James Gutch – drums, keyboards, programming (3)
- Jordan K. Johnson – drums, keyboards, programming (3)
- Stefan Johnson – drums, keyboards, programming (3)
- Tony Coles – arrangement, programming (7); keyboards (11)
- Nick Monson – acoustic guitar, arrangement, electric guitar, programming (7)
- BandPlay – arrangement, programming (7)
- Mark Nilan Jr. – arrangement, piano (7)
- Jon Robert Hall – additional vocals (7)
- Tiffany Rae Hall – additional vocals (7)
- Jon Hume – additional vocals, bass, drums, electric guitar, organ, piano, programming (10)
- Sol Philcox – acoustic guitar, electric guitar, steel guitar (10)
- Jackson Nance – additional vocals (10)
- Laura Veltz – additional vocals (10)
- Trey Keller – additional vocals (10)
- Charlie Handsome – guitar (11)

=== Technical ===
- Bainz – mixing, immersive mixing
- Joe LaPorta – mastering
- Tony Coles – vocal engineering (1, 3–5, 7–11)
- Lee J. Turner – vocal engineering (1)
- Ebony Maria Hadley – vocal engineering (2, 6)
- Stefan Johnson – vocal engineering (3)
- Austin Shawn – vocal engineering (4)
- Austin Goodloe – vocal engineering (5)
- Chip Matthews – vocal engineering (7)
- Dave Cohen – vocal engineering (8, 10)
- Juan "Saucy" Peña – vocal engineering (8, 11)
- Jon Hume – vocal engineering (10)
- Julian Bunetta – vocal engineering (11)
- Aresh Banaji – mixing
- Drew Silger – mixing assistance (4)
- Brady Wortzel – engineering assistance (3)

== Charts ==
=== Weekly charts ===
Weekly chart performance for I Hope You're Happy
Chart (2025)	Peak position
Australian Albums (ARIA)	56
Canadian Albums (Billboard)	17
US Billboard 200	7
US Independent Albums (Billboard)	2
US Top Country Albums (Billboard)	2

=== Year-end charts ===
Year-end chart performance for I Hope You're Happy
Chart (2025)	Position
US Top Country Albums (Billboard)	52

== Certifications ==
Certifications for I Hope You're Happy
Region	Certification	Certified units/sales
United States (RIAA)	Gold	500,000^{‡}
^{‡} Sales+streaming figures based on certification alone.
