= Personification (album) =

Studio album by Maxo Kream
- Released: November 15, 2024
- Recorded: 2022–24
- Genres: Hip-hop; trap
- Length: 43:59
- Label: Self-released
- Producers: Nascent; Tez; Loshendrix; Ryan ESL; Evilgiane; Lowkeys; Cubeatz; Tyler, the Creator; Zae; Grant Lapointe; Hit-Boy; Johnny Loomin; Ybpusa; Beat Butcha; Nick Grand; Devin Wordman

Maxo Kream chronology
Weight of the World (2021)	Personification (2024)

Singles from Personificaion
- 1. "Bang the Bus" Released: January 26, 2024; 2. "Cracc Era" Released: September 25, 2024; 3. "Big Hoe Me" Released: November 1, 2024

Professional ratings
Review scores
Source	Rating
Pitchfork	6.2/10
Slant Magazine	2.5/5 stars

Personification is the fourth studio album by American rapper Maxo Kream, self-released on November 15, 2024. Guest features include Tyler, the Creator, Denzel Curry, That Mexican OT, BigXthaPlug, Z-Ro, Rob49, and Skilla Baby.

== Background and promotion ==
On October 18, 2021, Kream released his third studio album, Weight of the World, with guest appearances including Tyler, the Creator, ASAP Rocky, Freddie Gibbs and Don Toliver. Between the release of the albums, he made many guest appearances and non-album singles with artists such as Anderson .Paak, Benny the Butcher, BigXthaPlug, Powers Pleasant and Denzel Curry.

On January 26, 2024, Kream released its debut single titled "Bang the Bus", detailing his sexual fantasies with a low-register flow. Continuing the promotion, he released its second single titled "Cracc Era" featuring Tyler, the Creator on September 25, their second collaboration and produced by Okonma, where he details for his love for bikes while Kream raps about his upbringing. On November 1, 2024, Kream released his third and final single titled "Big Hoe Me", rapping about discovering his father's arrest, a near-fatal experience, and realizing his mentor wasn't as tough as he thought.

Personification is Kream's first album released without the involvement of RCA Records, giving him creative freedom on the album's direction.

== Track listing ==
Personification track listing
No.	Title	Writer(s)	Producer	Length
1.	"Mo Murda"	Emekwanem Biosah II	Lowkeys	3:51
2.	"Fashitsho"	Biosah II	Nascent; Cubeatz	2:32
3.	"Cracc Era" (feat. Tyler, the Creator)	Biosah II; Tyler Okonma	Tyler, the Creator	1:55
4.	"Street Fraternity"	Biosah II	Zae	2:58
5.	"Big Hoe Me"	Biosah II	Nascent; Grant Lapointe; Loshendrix; Tez	4:50
6.	"Smokey" (feat. BigXthaPlug and Hit-Boy)	Biosah II; Xavier Landum; Chauncey Hollis II	Hit-Boy	3:13
7.	"Higher than Ever" (feat. Rob49 and Skilla Baby)	Biosah II; Robert Thomas; Trevon Garnder	Johnny Loomin; Ybpusa	3:01
8.	"Drizzy Draco 2"	Biosah II	Ryan ESL	2:36
9.	"Walk by Faith" (feat. Josh Kream)	Biosah II; Josh Kream	Nascent; Beat Butcha; Tez	3:28
10.	"Drop Top Impala" (feat. Z-Ro)	Biosah II; Joseph McVay IV	Nascent; Tez	3:23
11.	"Bibles and Rifles"	Biosah II	Evilgiane; Loshendrix	2:04
12.	"Takin in Screw" (feat. That Mexican OT)	Biosah II; Virgil Gazca	Nick Grand	3:41
13.	"Bang the Bus"	Biosah II; Devin Workman; Giane Chenheu	Evilgiane; Devin Wordman	2:56
14.	"Triggaman" (feat. Denzel Curry)	Biosah II; Denzel Curry	Ryan ESL	3:25
Total length:				43:59

== Personnel ==
- Distributed By – The Orchard
- Copyright © – Stomp Down
- Engineer – Jason Barton, Nick Grand
- Executive Producer – Maxo Kream, Nascent
- Mastered By – Nicolas De Parcel
- Mixed By – Brandon K Johnson
