= Pray Hard (song) =

2025 song by BigXthaPlug featuring Luke Combs

Song by BigXthaPlug featuring Luke Combs

from the album I Hope You're Happy
- Released: August 22, 2025
- Genre: Country rap; trap
- Length: 2:06
- Label: UnitedMasters
- Songwriters: Xavier Landum; Luke Combs; Dave Cohen; Krishon Gaines; Jon Hall; Nick Monson; Mark Nilan Jr.
- Producers: BandPlay; Cohen; Coles; Monson; Nilan; Hall; Chip Matthews

Music video
- "Pray Hard" on YouTube

"Pray Hard" is a song by American rapper BigXthaPlug featuring American country singer Luke Combs. It is the seventh track from the former's third studio album I Hope You're Happy (2025). The song was produced by BandPlay, Dave Cohen, Coles, Nick Monson, Mark Nilan Jr., Jon Hall, and Chip Matthews.

== Background ==
Following the success of "Home" featuring Shaboozey, BigXthaPlug continued his exploration of country-rap crossovers by collaborating with mainstream country star Luke Combs on "Pray Hard" for his third studio album.

== Composition ==
"Pray Hard" is a country rap song that blends traditional country instrumentation with contemporary trap production. The track opens with gentle acoustic guitar and steel guitar elements before transitioning into harder 808s and trap percussion. The production maintains a balance between both genres throughout its 2:06 runtime.

Lyrically, the song explores themes of faith, perseverance, and gratitude. Luke Combs delivers the hook with his signature country vocals, emphasizing the importance of prayer during difficult times. BigXthaPlug's verses detail his journey from struggle to success, acknowledging the role of faith in his rise. The track combines spiritual reflection with street authenticity, creating a narrative about maintaining one's beliefs while navigating challenges. Both artists trade verses about staying grounded despite success and the importance of staying connected to their roots and values.

== Critical reception ==
The song received positive reviews from music critics, who praised the unexpected but effective pairing of BigXthaPlug and Luke Combs. Critics noted that the collaboration felt organic despite the artists' different backgrounds, with both bringing authenticity to the track's themes of faith and perseverance. The production was highlighted as particularly effective in bridging the gap between country and hip-hop, creating a sound that appealed to fans of both genres. Several reviewers commented that "Pray Hard" represented a natural evolution of BigXthaPlug's country-rap explorations, with Luke Combs' vocal contributions adding mainstream appeal without compromising the song's authenticity.

== Commercial performance ==
"Pray Hard" reached number 1 on the Bubbling Under Hot 100 chart, which ranks the top 25 songs that have not yet entered the main Hot 100 chart. The song debuted at number 30 on the Hot Country Songs chart, marking Combs' sixty-eighth career entry on that chart. It also achieved significant success on rap charts, debuting at number 5 on the Rap Digital Song Sales chart, becoming Combs' first top 10 on any rap-specific chart. It additionally entered at number 15 on the Hot Rap Songs chart.

== Performance video ==
An official performance video for "Pray Hard" premiered on August 28, 2025. The video features BigXthaPlug and Luke Combs delivering live performances of the track, showcasing the collaboration between the two artists.

== Charts ==
Chart performance for "Pray Hard"
Chart (2025)	Peak position
US Bubbling Under Hot 100 Singles (Billboard)	1
US Hot Country Songs (Billboard)	30
US Hot Rap Songs (Billboard)	15
US Rap Digital Song Sales (Billboard)	5
