= Change Me =

Change Me may refer to:

- Change Me (album), an album by Leehom Wang
- "Change Me" (BigXthaPlug song), 2024
- "Change Me" (Justin Bieber song), 2013
- "Change Me" (Keri Hilson song), 2009
- "Change Me" (Ruben Studdard song), 2006

== See also ==
- "A Change in Me", a 2002 song for the musical Beauty and the Beast
