= Fake Jeezy =

2026 song by Maxo Kream

Single by Maxo Kream featuring Denzel Curry and JPEGMafia

from the album O.Y.N
- Released: January 16, 2026
- Genre: Trap
- Length: 2:31
- Label: Empire
- Songwriters: Emekwanem Biosah II; Denzel Curry; Barrington Hendricks
- Producer: JPEGMafia

Maxo Kream singles chronology
"Cracc Era" (2025)	"Fake Jeezy" (2026)

Denzel Curry singles chronology
"Him" (2025)	"Fake Jeezy" (2026)	"Lit Effect" (2026)

JPEGMafia singles chronology
"Manic!" (2025)	"Fake Jeezy" (2026)	"Babygirl" (2026)

Music video
- "Fake Jeezy" on YouTube

"Fake Jeezy" is a song by American rapper Maxo Kream, featuring rapper Denzel Curry and production from rapper-producer JPEGMafia. It was released on January 16, 2026, by Empire Distribution, along with a music video.

== Background ==
Kream and Curry previously collaborated in 2024, guesting on each other's projects: King of the Mischievous South Vol. 2 by Curry and Personification by Kream.

== Composition ==
"Fake Jeezy" is a trap song that runs for two and a half minutes, featuring early 2000s trap-esque production from JPEGMafia under "frantic synth stabs". In the hook, Kream does as he pleases and is willing fight, referencing Young Jeezy's 2005 song "Trap or Die" and Atlanta-based group U.S.D.A.'s 2007 song "Corporate Thuggin'", also led by Jeezy. On the first verse, Kream raps about driving recklessly around Houston without fear of legal consequences. The second verse is rapped by Curry, using wordplay referencing the Kardashian family and fashion company Skims, also founded by Kim Kardashian. Despite appearing in the music video, JPEGMafia doesn't rap in the song.

== Release ==
On January 16, 2026, "Fake Jeezy" was released by Empire Distribution to streaming services along with a music video. The music video features Kream, Curry, and JPEGMafia, also starring a gigantic, angry CGI snowman fighting against helicopters. The music video was co-directed by Oakmobb and Jack Rottier.

== Personnel ==
Credits were adapted from Tidal.

- Maxo Kream – vocals
- Denzel Curry – vocals
- JPEGMafia – production
- Spencer Anderson – recording engineer
- Joey Galvan – recording engineer
- Sklyer Gibbons – mixing
- Darrious Hughes – recording engineer
- Brandon Instro Johnson – mastering, mixing
- Tashfiq Patwary – product manager
- Brandon Enrique Villanueva – recording engineer
