= 199X (rapper) =

Marquis Jackson
- Also known as: 199X
- Born: Marquis Jackson; September 27, 1996 (age 29); Wichita, Kansas, US
- Occupations: Rapper, Singer, Songwriter, Producer
- Years active: 2024-present
- Label: Numb
- Website: https://www.199X.io

Marquis Jackson, known professionally as 199X, is an American rapper from Wichita, Kansas. He is best known for his 2024 single "STNBY", which went number 1 on iTunes after going on tour with That Mexican OT.

== Career ==
As a performer, Jackson started to see success after graduating high school and moving to Orlando, Florida, where he would be among popular acts XXXTENTACION, Tyla Yaweh, and Wifisfuneral, but it wasn't until he moved to Los Angeles homeless that he would start to see success, emerging under 2X Grammy award-winning producer Ronny J and Grammy nominated production team The HitList. Jackson would start to emerge as a producer and artist, but would have short-lived success due to his ties to the streets.

In 2024, That Mexican OT offered Jackson to open up for his Tour, which led to Jackson releasing his single STNBY, charting number 1 on iTunes.
