= Whip It (BigXthaPlug song) =

2023 song by BigXthaPlug

Song by BigXthaPlug

from the album Amar
- Released: April 28, 2023
- Length: 2:17
- Label: UnitedMasters
- Songwriters: Xavier Landum; Krishon Gaines; Tony Anderson; Reginald Andrews; Leon Chancellor
- Producers: BandPlay; Tony Coles

Music video
- "Whip It" on YouTube

"Whip It" is a song by American rapper BigXthaPlug from the deluxe edition of his debut studio album Amar (2023). Produced by BandPlay and Tony Coles, it contains a sample of "Let It Whip" by the Dazz Band.

== TikTok challenge ==
In mid-2023, Jasmyn Nichols started a viral dance trend featuring the song which became known as the #WhipItChallenge.

== Music video ==
The music video was directed by Jerry Morka. It is themed after the disco era with a modern twist and sees BigXthaPlug dancing in a Soul Train line. He also wears a 1970s-style wig that is shaped afro. The video features a cameo from Jasmyn Nichols.

== Charts ==
Chart performance for "Whip It"
Chart (2023)	Peak position
US Mainstream R&B/Hip-Hop Airplay (Billboard)	33

== Certifications ==
Certifications for "Whip It"
Region	Certification	Certified units/sales
United States (RIAA)	Gold	500,000^{‡}
^{‡} Sales+streaming figures based on certification alone.
