= Baby Mad at Me =

2025 single by That Mexican OT and Lil Wayne

Single by That Mexican OT and Lil Wayne

from the album Recess
- Released: May 9, 2025
- Genre: Hip-hop; country pop
- Length: 3:28
- Label: Manifest; GoodTalk; Good Money; Capitol
- Songwriters: Virgil Gazca; Dwayne Carter Jr.; Chris Townsend; Gregory Davenport; Antoine Banks; Taylor Banks
- Producers: Bankroll Got It; Chris XZ

That Mexican OT singles chronology
"Bad Idea" (2025)	"Baby Mad at Me" (2025)

Lil Wayne singles chronology
"This Is Why" (2025)	"Baby Mad at Me" (2025)	"Yoda" (2025)

Music video
- "Baby Mad at Me" on YouTube

"Baby Mad at Me" is a song by American rappers That Mexican OT and Lil Wayne, released on May 9, 2025, as the lead single from the former's third studio album, Recess (2025). It was produced by Bankroll Got It and Chris XZ.

== Composition ==
"Baby Mad at Me" is a melodic, country-leaning ballad built on an electric guitar line, described as sparse and "reverb-drenched", along with a minimal beat. The lyrics find the rappers angering their respective partners with their irresponsible behavior, particularly concerning sexual encounters outside of their relationships. On the chorus, That Mexican OT croons about being in trouble with his girlfriend for cheating on her. He continues the story in the first verse, he raps about unsuccessfully trying to trick her and eventually confessing that he cannot help himself. The second verse depicts an argument between Lil Wayne and his girlfriend in which he is falsely accused of being unfaithful.

== Critical reception ==
The song received generally favorable reviews. Bryson "Boom" Paul of HotNewHipHop praised the collaboration, stating "Wayne, true to form, didn't write a bar. He hopped in the booth and spit straight off the dome, like always. That raw, off-the-top flow is what's kept him sharp after all these years. OT held his own, weaving in personal pain and wild-boy charm like only he can. You can feel both of them in their element, snapping on verses that cut through the beat like switchblades. Wayne slides in with that signature slur, giving out game like it's second nature. The chemistry's real. It's not just a feature—it feels like a co-sign and a torch pass in one." Tom Breihan of Stereogum commented "Lil Wayne sounds like he's having fun, and if you're not having fun on a song with That Mexican OT, you're doing it wrong." Preezy Brown of Vibe described That Mexican OT as performing "with a vulnerable edge that's refreshingly honest" and wrote "Lil Wayne slides in with a sharp, reflective verse of his own, continuing his recent hot streak with effortless charisma."

== Charts ==
Chart performance for "Baby Mad at Me"
Chart (2025)	Peak position
US Hot R&B/Hip-Hop Songs (Billboard)	37
