= Punken =

Studio album by Maxo Kream
- Released: January 12, 2018
- Genre: Hip hop
- Length: 44:03
- Labels: TSO; Kream Clicc
- Producers: Toby "Uncle Toby" Oniyitan (exec.); Wldnerness (exec.); Aaron Bow; Beat Boy; Drumline; Ethereal; Honorable C.N.O.T.E.; Kevin Parker; MexikoDro; Mitch Mula; Sonny Digital; Suicide Christ; Teddy Walton; Tommy Kruise; Wolfe de Mçhls; Drumline

Maxo Kream chronology
The Persona Tape (2016)	Punken (2018)	Brandon Banks (2019)

Punken is the debut studio album by American rapper Maxo Kream, released on January 12, 2018, by TSO Music Group and Kream Clicc. The album was produced by Sonny Digital, Beat Boy, Wlderness and rapper $crim of Suicideboys, among others. It also features guest appearances from Trippie Redd, D. Flowers and 03 Greedo.

Punken was supported by three singles – "Grannies", "5200" and "Bussdown".

== Background ==
On January 3, 2018, Maxo Kream unveiled the album's cover art, tracklist and release date, alongside its pre-order.

== Promotion ==
=== Tour ===
On February 7, 2018, Maxo Kream announced an official headlining concert tour to further promote the album titled Punken Tour. The tour began on March 21, 2018, in San Francisco, at Brick & Mortar. He was supported by Cuz Lightyear.

Tour dates
Date	City	Venue
March 21, 2018	San Francisco	Brick & Mortar
March 23, 2018	Santa Ana	Constellation Room
March 24, 2018	West Hollywood	The Roxy Theatre
March 26, 2018	Scottsdale	Pub Rock
March 28, 2018	Houston	Warehouse Live
March 30, 2018	Austin	Come and Take It Live
March 31, 2018	San Antonio	Alamo City Music Hall
April 3, 2018	New Orleans	The Parish at House of Blues
April 5, 2018	Atlanta	Aisle 5
April 6, 2018	Charlotte	Neighborhood Theater
April 7, 2018	Greensboro	Arizona Pete's
April 10, 2018	Baltimore	Soundstage
April 11, 2018	Washington	Songbyrd
April 12, 2018	New York	SOB's
April 13, 2018	Philadelphia	Voltage Lounge
April 15, 2018	Boston	Brighton Music Hall
April 17, 2018	Pittsburgh	Spirit Hall
April 18, 2018	Cleveland	Gorg Shop
April 23, 2018	Minneapolis	7th St Entry
April 26, 2018	Denver	Cervantes
April 28, 2018	El Paso	Lowbrow Palace

== Critical reception ==
Professional ratings
Review scores
Source	Rating
Pitchfork	7.6/10

Sheldon Pearce of Pitchfork stated that "the Houston rapper's first mixtape since 2016 is full of unsparing storytelling, pusher anthems, and a dynamic array of trap production over which Maxo delivers some of his most effective writing", praising the album's lyricism: "Maxo has always been an impressive rapper and an imposing force, maximizing his thunderous voice, but Punken has his most effective writing, his most complete performances, his most engrossing setups, and his most enduring images."

== Track listing ==
No.	Title	Producer(s)	Length
1.	"Work"	Wlderness; Beat Boy	4:10
2.	"Grannies"	MexikoDro	3:31
3.	"Capeesh" (featuring Trippie Redd)	Tommy Kruise	3:36
4.	"Bussdown"	Wlderness	2:50
5.	"Hobbies"	Ethereal	2:24
6.	"Go" (featuring D. Flowers)	Mitch Mula; Drumline	2:49
7.	"Beyonce (Interlude)"	Sonny Digital	2:23
8.	"Astrodome, Pt. 2"	Honorable C.N.O.T.E.	2:12
9.	"Love Drugs"	Budd Dwyer	3:05
10.	"Pop Another"	Teddy Walton; Aaron Bow; Kevin Parker	2:46
11.	"Janky"	Wolfe de Mçhls	3:17
12.	"Atw" (featuring 03 Greedo)	Beat Boy	2:29
13.	"Roaches"	Wlderness	4:21
14.	"5200"	Beat Boy	3:30
Total length:			44:03
