= Take Care (BigXthaPlug album) =

2024 album by BigXthaPlug

- Standard cover; Spotify cover features a front facing view, while YouTube features the digital deluxe cover art, covering his face instead.

Studio album by BigXthaPlug
- Released: October 11, 2024
- Genres: Hip-hop; Southern hip-hop; trap
- Length: 31:13
- Label: UnitedMasters
- Producers: Aimonmyneck; BandPlay; Charley Cooks; DWilly; Einer Bankz; Haze; IIInfinite; Sheffmade; Tony Coles; Zuus

BigXthaPlug chronology
Meet the 6ixers (2024)	Take Care (2024)	I Hope You're Happy (2025)

Singles from Take Care
- 1. "The Largest" Released: August 9, 2024; 2. "Change Me" Released: September 27, 2024

Take Care is the second studio album by American rapper BigXthaPlug, independently released on October 11, 2024, via UnitedMasters. It serves as the follow-up to his collaborative mixtape Meet the 6ixers (2024) and the EP The Biggest (2023). The album features a single guest appearance by Wallo267. Production was handled by BandPlay, Einer Bankz, Tony Coles, and several other producers. A deluxe edition was released on January 24, 2025, with three additional tracks.

== Background and recording ==
Upon the release of the album, Landum appeared in an interview with Rolling Stone in which he revealed that during the making of the record, he sat down with his team and ideated three themes for the album, the first being, "when it get better, it get worse", the second, "do what you gotta do", and the final, "growth and success". When asked to go in-depth about the topics, Landum stated:

We got money. Yeah, we got cars. We got this. But it's [discussed in] a more mature way. We're not bragging about it. We just speaking on it. It's there, but I care more about taking care of my people and my kids.

== Release and promotion ==
On August 9, 2024, Landum released the album's lead single, "The Largest". Later that month, on August 28, Landum was revealed to be Amazon Music's breakthrough artist of the year. On September 6, Landum co-headlined Billboard's Hip-Hop Live Concert in Brooklyn. On September 27, Landum released the album's second single, "Change Me".

== Critical reception ==
Professional ratings
Review scores
Source	Rating
AllMusic	3.5/5 stars

Writing for AllMusic, Paul Simpson described the album as "filled with lush soul samples and booming beats", noting its influences from 1980s R&B and gospel. He praised the album's sound and BigXthaPlug's vocal performances, writing, "Take Care affirms BigX's status as one of the biggest forces in Southern rap during the 2020s".

== Commercial performance ==
Take Care debuted at number eight on the US Billboard 200 with 48,000 album-equivalent units (including 1,500 in pure sales) in its first week. It became Landum's first top ten on the chart and accumulated a total of 62.77 million on-demand streams of its songs.

== Track listing ==
Take Care track listing
No.	Title	Writer(s)	Producer(s)	Length
1.	"Take Care"	Xavier Landum; Tony Anderson; Wallace Peeples; Willie Hutch	Tony Coles	2:29
2.	"Lost the Love"	Landum; Ethan Hayes; Clarence Reid; James Price	Haze; Sheffmade; Zuus	2:15
3.	"Change Me"	Landum; Anderson; Krishon Gaines; Charles Forsberg; Jake Troth	Tony Coles; Bandplay; Charley Cooks	2:16
4.	"Leave Me Alone"	Landum; Gaines; Zabornikov Vladislav; Divashen Govender	Bandplay; Aimonmyneck	2:23
5.	"Therapy Session"	Landum; Anderson; Gaines; David Wilson	Tony Coles; Bandplay; DWilly	1:48
6.	"Planting Seeds"	Landum; Anderson; Gaines; Forsberg	Tony Coles; Bandplay; Charley Cooks	1:40
7.	"Words from Wallo267"	Landum; Anderson; Peeples	Tony Coles	0:46
8.	"Law & Order"	Landum; Anderson; Forsberg	Tony Coles; Charley Cooks	2:41
9.	"Back on My BS"	Landum; Anderson; James Economides, Jr.	Tony Coles	1:34
10.	"2AM"	Landum; Vladislav; DeShaun Williams; Robert Kelly	Aimonmyneck; DeShaun Williams	3:04
11.	"Story of X"	Landum; Anderson; Gaines; Peeples	Tony Coles; Bandplay	2:19
12.	"The Largest"	Landum; Anderson; Gaines; Charles Miller; Harold Brown; Howard Scott; Lonnie Jordan; Lee Oskar; Morris Dickerson; Thomas Allen; Ro'Darrion Harrison	Tony Coles; Bandplay	2:12
13.	"Mmhmm"	Landum; Gaines; Forsberg; Leon Sylvers III; Stephen Shockley; William Shelby; Harrison	Bandplay; Charley Cooks	1:59
14.	"Rich off Rap"	Landum; Forsberg; Price; Spencer Harris; Rick James	Charley Cooks; Sheffmade; Einer Bankz; IIInfinite	2:00
15.	"They Don't Know"	Landum; Anderson; Thomas Barrett Jr.	Tony Coles	1:42
Total length:				31:13

Deluxe edition
No.	Title	Writer(s)	Producer(s)	Length
16.	"Holy Ground" (with Jessie Murph)	Landum; Jessie Murph; Jon Hall; Forsberg; Anderson; Victor Williams; Laura Veltz	Charley Cooks; Tony Coles	2:57
17.	"Life of a Boss"	Landum; Anderson; Gaines; Vladislav Zabornikov; Madeline Stone; Marc Gabriele; Norman Dolph	Tony Coles; BandPlay; Aimonmyneck	2:04
18.	"Comes & Goes" (with Tommy Newport)	Landum; Oliver Milmine; Mateen Niknam; Mikael Haataja; Samuel Haataja; RoDarrion Harrison; Adam Farag	AyoPeeb; Off & Out	2:01
Total length:				38:15

=== Notes ===
- "Take Care", "Words from Wallo267" and "Story of X" feature spoken word by Wallo267.
- "Back on My BS" and "Mmhmm" were originally included on The Biggest (2023).
- "Take Care" contains a sample of "Tell Me Why Has Our Love Turned Cold", written and performed by Willie Hutch.
- "2AM" contains samples of "Contagious", written by Robert Kelly, as performed by the Isley Brothers featuring R. Kelly and Chanté Moore.
- "The Largest" contains a sample of "Slippin' into Darkness", written and performed by War.
- "Mmhmm" contains a sample of "And the Beat Goes On", written by Leon Sylvers III, Stephen Shockley, and William Shelby, as performed by the Whispers.
- "Rich off Rap" contains samples of "Give It to Me Baby", written and performed by Rick James.
- "They Don't Know" contains samples of "Nobody Knows", written and performed by Pastor T. L. Barrett and the Youth for Christ Choir.

== Charts ==
=== Weekly charts ===
Weekly chart performance for Take Care
Chart (2024–2025)	Peak position
Canadian Albums (Billboard)	63
New Zealand Albums (RMNZ)	24
US Billboard 200	8
US Independent Albums (Billboard)	1
US Top R&B/Hip-Hop Albums (Billboard)	3

=== Year-end charts ===
Year-end chart performance for Take Care
Chart (2025)	Position
New Zealand Albums (RMNZ)	38
US Billboard 200	21
US Top R&B/Hip-Hop Albums (Billboard)	7

== Certifications ==
Certifications for Take Care
Region	Certification	Certified units/sales
New Zealand (RMNZ)	Gold	7,500^{‡}
United States (RIAA)	Platinum	1,000,000^{‡}
^{‡} Sales+streaming figures based on certification alone.

== Release history ==
Release dates and formats for Take Care
Region	Date	Label(s)	Format(s)	Edition(s)	Ref.
Various	October 11, 2024	UnitedMasters	Digital download; streaming	Standard	
Various	January 24, 2025	UnitedMasters	Digital download; streaming	Deluxe	
Various	May 30, 2025	UnitedMasters	CD; LP	Standard	

== See also ==
- 2024 in hip hop music
- List of 2024 albums
