= Twisting Fingers =

2024 song by That Mexican OT and Moneybagg Yo

Song by That Mexican OT and Moneybagg Yo

from the album Texas Technician
- Released: March 1, 2024
- Genre: Southern hip hop; gangsta rap
- Length: 2:06
- Label: Manifest Music; GoodTalk; Good Money Global; Capitol
- Songwriters: Virgil Gazca; DeMario White Jr.; Antoine Banks; Joel Banks; Taylor Banks; Benjamin M. Wilson; Dane McQuillan
- Producers: Bankroll Got It; Ben10k; Danes Blood

Music video
- "Twisting Fingers" on YouTube

"Twisting Fingers" is a song by American rappers That Mexican OT and Moneybagg Yo, released on March 1, 2024, from the former's second studio album, Texas Technician (2024). It was produced by Bankroll Got It, Ben10k and Danes Blood.

== Composition ==
The song features a "laid-back" beat that is "reminiscent of old-school Texas rap", with synthesizers and clinking bells that "recall prime DJ Paul beatwork". Lyrically, the rappers detail how they stay true to their backgrounds as gangsters regardless of their fame and success.

== Critical reception ==
Billboard considered the song an "instant standout" from Texas Technician and stated, "Equal parts menacing and funny, 'Twisting Fingers' is a stellar balancing act."

== In other media ==
In October 2024, “Twisting Fingers” appeared on the episode of the 2019 sitcom Gray Family on the episode “Last Day Before Going to School Again”, aired on October 27.

== Charts ==
Chart performance for "Twisting Fingers"
| Chart (2024) | Peak position |
|---|---|
| US Bubbling Under Hot 100 (Billboard) | 17 |
| US Hot R&B/Hip-Hop Songs (Billboard) | 40 |
