= Box Me Up =

2025 song by BigXthaPlug featuring Jelly Roll

Song by BigXthaPlug featuring Jelly Roll

from the album I Hope You're Happy
- Released: August 22, 2025
- Genre: Country rap
- Length: 2:53
- Label: UnitedMasters
- Songwriters: Xavier Landum; Jason DeFord; Gregory Hein; James Gutch; Jordan Johnson; Stefan Johnson; Stavros Tsarouhas
- Producers: Aldae; Gutch; The Monsters & Strangerz; Tsarouhas

Music video
- "Box Me Up" on YouTube

"Box Me Up" is a song by American rapper BigXthaPlug featuring American singer Jelly Roll. It was released on August 22, 2025, from the former's third studio album I Hope You're Happy, with an accompanying music video. The song was produced by Aldae, James Gutch, the Monsters & Strangerz and Stavros Tsarouhas.

== Background ==
In a short behind-the-scenes clip before the music video's premiere, BigXthaPlug said:

It's a very emotional song. It talks about love in relationships, hate in relationships. Hopefully the song's lyrics help with [peoples'] relationship problems as well, but they enjoy the video and how we put this big production together.

== Content ==
In the song, the artists detail the consequences they would face themselves if they were to be separated from their lovers, with morbid imagery, to emphasize how much they mean to them. It opens with Jelly Roll performing a melodic chorus, in which he asks to be buried alive if he loses his partner. BigXthaPlug raps about how he would be forever heartbroken and go insane if his lover leaves him, especially since he feels he made every effort to nurture and continue the relationship but to no avail.

== Critical reception ==
The song received generally positive reviews. Michael Saponara of Billboard ranked it as the second best song from I Hope You're Happy. Maxim Mower of Holler wrote that it finds Jelly Roll "taking the helm for a powerful, stirring chorus, with Jelly's sleek, raspy vocals gliding soulfully across an atmospheric, strings-driven instrumental." He described BigXthaPlug's verses to be "as cascading and punchline-laden as ever" and commented he was "showcasing how comfortable he is putting his heart on his sleeve, rather than following many contemporaries in masking their pain with hedonism." Aaron Williams of Uproxx remarked "This is some real beggin' music here, and the combination of Jelly Roll's raspy wail and X's barrel-chested grumble makes the fusion of rap and country the perfect vehicle for it."

== Music video ==
The music video was directed by Jerry Morka. It sees the artists performing the song in a "majestic" theater. The phrase in the song's title is presented literally at times, with them appearing inside a glass case that is placed on the stage. The clip is interspersed with scenes from a relationship, including both tender moments and conflicts.

== Charts ==
Chart performance for "Box Me Up"
Chart (2025)	Peak position
Canada Hot 100 (Billboard)	88
US Billboard Hot 100	61
US Hot Country Songs (Billboard)	18
