= Back on My BS =

2023 song by BigXthaPlug

Song by BigXthaPlug

from the album The Biggest and Take Care
- Released: December 1, 2023
- Genre: Hip-hop
- Length: 1:34
- Label: UnitedMasters
- Songwriters: Xavier Landum; Tony Anderson; James Economides, Jr.
- Producer: Tony Coles

Music video
- "Back on My BS" on YouTube

"Back on My BS" is a song by American rapper BigXthaPlug from his EP The Biggest (2023) and second studio album Take Care (2024). It was produced by Tony Coles.

== Critical reception ==
Steven Louis of Passion of the Weiss commented that the song's beat "sounds like it's emanating from a casino lounge in distant timespace" and praised BigXthaPlug's performance, writing "Everything he raps here is a declaration of fact. These peons ain't steppin' how this man is steppin'. BigXthaPlug is indeed Rap Game Zion Williamson. We cannot get caught associating with the loose-lipped. In a year with seldom few things to celebrate, BigXthaPlug was a spiked oasis buzzing through the Fanta bottle.

== Charts ==
Chart performance for "Back on My BS"
Chart (2024)	Peak position
US Billboard Hot 100	95
US Hot R&B/Hip-Hop Songs (Billboard)	32

== Certifications ==
Region	Certification	Certified units/sales
United States (RIAA)	Platinum	1,000,000^{‡}
^{‡} Sales+streaming figures based on certification alone.
