= Holy Ground (BigXthaPlug and Jessie Murph song) =

2025 song by BigXthaPlug and Jessie Murph

Song by BigXthaPlug and Jessie Murph

from the album Take Care
- Released: January 24, 2025
- Length: 2:57
- Label: UnitedMasters
- Songwriters: Xavier Landum; Jessie Murph; Jon Hall; Charles Forsberg III; Tony Anderson; Victor Williams; Laura Veltz
- Producers: Charley Cooks; Tony Coles

"Holy Ground" is a song by American rapper BigXthaPlug and Jessie Murph from the deluxe edition of BigXthaPlug's second studio album, Take Care (2025). It was produced by Charley Cooks and Tony Coles.

== Composition ==
The song is about resilience in the face of life's struggles. Jessie Murph sings the chorus, in which she notes how people are shaped by such challenges. In his verse, BigXthaPlug reflects on the harsh realities of his success, such as betrayal and failure to meet certain expectations, and emphasizes his loyalty and hard work have been important to achieving his successful life.

== Charts ==
=== Weekly charts ===
Weekly chart performance for "Holy Ground"
Chart (2025)	Peak position
US Bubbling Under Hot 100 (Billboard)	2
US Hot R&B/Hip-Hop Songs (Billboard)	26

=== Year-end charts ===
Year-end chart performance for "Holy Ground"
Chart (2025)	Position
US Hot R&B/Hip-Hop Songs (Billboard)	66
