= 02.02.99 =

2024 single by That Mexican OT

Single by That Mexican OT

from the album Texas Technician
- Released: January 9, 2024
- Length: 2:42
- Label: Manifest; GoodTalk; Good Money
- Songwriters: Virgil Gazca; Adrian Lara; Gregory Davenport; Joshua Roy
- Producers: DJ Skelez; Rocco Roy

That Mexican OT singles chronology
"Covered in Ice" (2023)	"02.02.99" (2024)	"Point Em Out" (2024)

Music video
- "02.02.99" on YouTube

"02.02.99" is a single by American rapper That Mexican OT, released on January 9, 2024 with an accompanying music video directed by DGreenFilmz. It was produced by DJ Skelez and Rocco Roy. The title of the song refers to That Mexican OT's date of birth.

== Critical reception ==
Zachary Horvath of HotNewHipHop wrote, "'02.02.99' is a straight raging banger. The beat is dark and stank-facing inducing. His bars are funny but also clever. Case in point, the first bar: 'I ain't f*** yo' sister, b****, I'm just a motherf****r / Nah, I'm lyin', I knocked her a** down too and we got in a lots of trouble, ugh.'" Shawn Grant described That Mexican OT as "delivering a fresh wave of his distinctive style and lyrical prowess."

== Charts ==
Chart performance for "02.02.99"
Chart (2024)	Peak position
US Billboard Hot 100	74
US Hot R&B/Hip-Hop Songs (Billboard)	30
