= Big Yavo =

American rapper (born 2000)

- Born: Yaven Mauldin; August 2, 2000 (age 26)
- Origin: Birmingham, Alabama
- Genres: Hip hop; trap
- Occupations: Rapper; songwriter
- Instrument: Vocals
- Years active: 2019–present
- Labels: GoodTalk; Cinematic; Gorilla Gang

Yaven Mauldin (born August 2, 2000), known professionally as Big Yavo, is an American rapper. Born in Birmingham, Alabama, he rose to prominence in 2020 after signing with Cinematic Music Group and releasing his debut mixtape, On God.

== Early life ==
Yaven Mauldin was born on August 2, 2000, in Birmingham, Alabama. Growing up in the neighborhood of Ensley, he played baseball in his youth and worked at Walmart.

== Career ==
Mauldin was originally known as 41st Yavo when he began his rap career in 2019, before changing his name to Big Yavo. He gained traction in 2020 with his single "No Pen". After signing with Cinematic Music Group, he released his debut mixtape, On God, on May 8, 2020. Mauldin followed the project up with August 2020's Gorilla Warfare, a collaborative mixtape with fellow Alabama rapper Luh Soldier. Mauldin ended the year with his sophomore mixtape Dumb Ass, released on November 6, 2020.

On June 18, 2021, Mauldin released On God II, his third mixtape and a sequel to On God. The project peaked at number seven on Billboard's Heatseekers Albums chart. On November 26, he released his fourth mixtape, Like Yay, which peaked at number one on the Heatseekers Albums chart.

On November 25, 2022, Mauldin released The Largest, his fifth mixtape and first project under Geffen Records. On August 18, 2023, he released Proof, his sixth mixtape. It marked his first project under the label GoodTalk, the successor to Cinematic Music Group.

On June 21, 2024, Mauldin released his debut studio album, The Giant. In July, Mauldin had a sit-down conversation with Randall Woodfin, the mayor of Birmingham. The two discussed the rise of gun violence in the city, as well as the deaths of their friends and relatives.

On June 20, 2025, Mauldin released his second studio album, Dingers. On May 22, 2026, Like Yay 2, his third studio album and a sequel to Like Yay.

== Discography ==
=== Studio albums ===
Title	Album details
The Giant	Released: June 21, 2024; Label: GoodTalk; Format: Digital download, streaming
Dingers	Released: June 20, 2025; Label: GoodTalk; Format: Digital download, streaming
Like Yay 2	Released: May 22, 2026; Label: GoodTalk; Format: Digital download, streaming

=== Mixtapes ===
Title	Mixtape details
On God	Released: May 6, 2020; Label: Cinematic, Soldier Life; Format: Digital download, streaming
Gorilla Warfare (with Luh Soldier)	Released: August 28, 2020; Label: Cinematic, Soldier Life, Gorilla Gang; Format: Digital download, streaming
Dumb Ass	Released: November 6, 2020; Label: Cinematic, Gorilla Gang; Format: Digital download, streaming
On God II	Released: June 18, 2021; Label: Cinematic, Gorilla Gang; Format: Digital download, streaming
Like Yay	Released: November 26, 2021; Label: Cinematic, Gorilla Gang; Format: Digital download, streaming
The Largest	Released: November 25, 2022; Label: Cinematic, Geffen; Format: Digital download, streaming
Proof	Released: August 18, 2023; Label: GoodTalk, Geffen; Format: Digital download, streaming
Hardy Brothers (with GMF FatBoy)	Released: August 30, 2024; Label: Hitmaker, Supa; Format: Digital download, streaming

=== Singles ===
Title	Year	Certifications	Album
"Scoot Up"	2020		On God
"No Pen"	2020		On God
"Locked Bond"	2020		On God
"Country Boy"	2020		Dumb Ass
"Shawn Kemp"	2020		Dumb Ass
"Miami Heat" (with Luh Soldier and Li Heat)	2020		Gorilla Warfare
"Saw"	2020		Dumb Ass
"Freestyle"	2021		On God II
"Rich"	2021		On God II
"Ice"	2021		On God II
"Him"	2021		Like Yay
"Tit for Tat"	2021		Like Yay
"Whole Lotta Money"	2022		The Largest
"Get Em" (with RiskTakerLeek)	2023		King of the Bricks
"Boy" (with BigXthaPlug)	2023	RIAA: Gold	Non-album single
"Facts"	2023		Proof
"Speak Spanish" (with GMF FatBoy)	2023		Hardy Brothers
"Door Dash" (with GMF FatBoy)	2024		Hardy Brothers
"Webbie Flow"	2025		Dingers
"Shake It" (featuring Key Glock)	2026		Like Yay 2

=== Other certified songs ===
Title	Year	Certifications	Album
"Hit List" (with That Mexican OT and BigXthaPlug)	2023	RIAA: Gold	Lonestar Luchador

=== Guest appearances ===
Title	Year	Other artist(s)	Album
"Check"	2023	BiC Fizzle	Clark Street Baby
"Off Top"	2024	Dee Mula	Focus More on Me
"Not Drippin"	2026	Sosamann	The Brown Album
