= Brandon Banks (album) =

Studio album by Maxo Kream
- Released: July 19, 2019
- Genre: Trap
- Length: 47:45
- Labels: Big Persona; 88 Classic; RCA
- Producers: Mike Dean (also exec.); Teej (also exec.); Kal Banx; Smash David; D. A. Doman; Apex Martin; Ryan ESL; Chuck Inglish; Zaytoven; Supah Mario; TEAO; Chasethemoney

Maxo Kream chronology
Punken (2018)	Brandon Banks (2019)	Weight of the World (2021)

Brandon Banks is the second studio album by American rapper Maxo Kream, released on July 19, 2019, by Big Persona, 88 Classic, and RCA Records. It is his major-label debut album. The album was produced by Mike Dean, Teej, Kal Banx, Smash David, D.A. Doman, among others. It also features guest appearances from Travis Scott, Megan Thee Stallion, Schoolboy Q, ASAP Ferg and KCG Josh.

== Critical reception ==
Professional ratings
Aggregate scores
Source	Rating
Metacritic	84/100
Review scores
Source	Rating
AllMusic	4/5 stars
Consequence of Sound	B+
Exclaim!	8/10
Juice	5/6 stars
Pitchfork	8.4/10
Highsnobiety	4.5/5
Rolling Stone	4/5

The album was widely acclaimed by critics. Stephen Kearse of Pitchfork stated that "like Punken before it, Brandon Banks is a major leap in craft and style as well as refinement of his self-image."

== Track listing ==
Credits were adapted from the album's liner notes, Tidal.

No.	Title	Writer(s)	Producer(s)	Length
1.	"Meet Again"	Emekwanem Biosah, Jr.; Michael Dean; Patrick Adams; Afolabi Osinulu	Mike Dean; Teej	5:20
2.	"Bissonnet"	E. Biosah; Dean; Kal Banx; Brandon Banks; Angelo Bond; Osinulu	Kal Banx	2:24
3.	"Change"	E. Biosah; Samuel Jimenez; Felipe Spain; Yung Lan	Smash David	3:48
4.	"The Relays" (featuring Travis Scott)	E. Biosah; Jacques Webster II; David Doman; Joshua White; Barry White; Chad Butler; Christopher Torpey; Bernard Freeman; Osinulu	D. A. Doman	2:57
5.	"8 Figures"	E. Biosah; Dean; Doman; Christina Doman; Aston Harris; Eliot Baker	Mike Dean; D. A. Doman; Apex Martin	4:05
6.	"She Live" (featuring Megan Thee Stallion)	E. Biosah; Megan Pete; Dean; Osinulu; Joshua Biosah	Teej	2:50
7.	"Drizzy Draco"	E. Biosah; Dean; Charles Smith	Ryan ESL	2:36
8.	"3AM" (featuring Schoolboy Q)	E. Biosah; Quincy Hanley; Dean; Harris; Paul Beauregard; Evan Ingersoll	Mike Dean; Chuck Inglish; Apex Martin	2:58
9.	"Spice Ln."	E. Biosah; Dean; Xavier Dotson	Zaytoven	3:22
10.	"Murda Blocc" (featuring ASAP Ferg)	E. Biosah; Darold Ferguson, Jr.; Dean; Smith	Ryan ESL	3:06
11.	"Pray 2 The Dope"	E. Biosah; Dean; D. Doman; Aeb Byrne	D. A. Doman	3:32
12.	"Brenda"	E. Biosah; Dean; Banx; Osinulu	Kal Banx	3:05
13.	"Brothers" (featuring KCG Josh)	E. Biosah; J. Biosah; Dean; Banks; Jonathan Priester	Supah Mario	3:04
14.	"Dairy Ashford Bastard"	E. Biosah; Dean; Banks; Osinulu	Teej	2:13
15.	"Still"	E. Biosah; Dean; Banks; Chase Rose	Chasethemoney	2:25
Total length:				47:45

== Charts ==
Chart (2019)	Peak position
US Billboard 200	68
