= Point Em Out =

2024 single by That Mexican OT and DaBaby

Single by That Mexican OT and DaBaby

from the album Texas Technician
- Released: February 2, 2024
- Length: 2:14
- Label: Manifest Music; GoodTalk; Good Money Global; Capitol
- Songwriters: Virgil Gazca; Jonathan Kirk; Antoine Banks; Joel Banks; Taylor Banks; Nicholas Kwak
- Producers: Bankroll Got It; 88nck

That Mexican OT singles chronology
"02.02.99" (2024)	"Point Em Out" (2024)

DaBaby singles chronology
"Perfect" (2024)	"Point Em Out" (2024)	"Wonder Woman" (2024)

Music video
- "Point Em Out" on YouTube

"Point Em Out" is a song by American rappers That Mexican OT and DaBaby, released on February 2, 2024, as the second single from the former's second studio album, Texas Technician (2024). It was produced by Bankroll Got It and 88nck.

== Composition and critical reception ==
Zachary Horvath of HotNewHipHop called the song "another murderous single that sees both MCs on a manhunt of sorts" and wrote "Bankroll Got It also deserves a lot of credit here as well. The California-based producer brings a watery, club-ready beat with some killer piano keys." Shawn Grant of The Source commented that both rappers "showcase their slick-talking prowess, with OT skillfully rolling his r's and DaBaby delivering his signature double-time flow."

== Music video ==
The music video was directed by D-Green Films and released alongside the single. It pays homage to the film Pulp Fiction, with That Mexican OT and DaBaby taking the roles of characters Vincent Vega and Jules Winnfield respectively. They cruise through Los Angeles in pursuit of a briefcase.

== Charts ==
Chart performance for "Point Em Out"
Chart (2024)	Peak position
US Bubbling Under Hot 100 (Billboard)	8
US Hot R&B/Hip-Hop Songs (Billboard)	44
