= Climate (song) =

2023 song by BigXthaPlug and Offset

Song by BigXthaPlug and Offset

from the EP The Biggest
- Released: December 1, 2023
- Genre: Hip-hop; trap
- Length: 2:50
- Label: UnitedMasters
- Songwriters: Xavier Landum; Kiari Cephus; Krishon Gaines; Charles Forsberg III
- Producers: Bandplay; Charley Cooks

Music video
- "Climate" on YouTube

"Climate" is a song by American rappers BigXthaPlug and Offset from the former's EP The Biggest (2023). Produced by Bandplay and Charley Cooks, it contains a sample of "Is That Enough" by Marvin Gaye. The song debuted and peaked at number 48 on the Billboard Hot R&B/Hip-Hop Songs chart.

== Composition and critical reception ==
Zachary Horvath of HotNewHipHop wrote a positive review, stating that the rappers' "aggressive flow patterns are perfect compliments [sic]" and "Production is also a strong point here with its watery and plucky synths and banging trap percussion".

== Charts ==
Chart performance for "Climate"
Chart (2023)	Peak position
US Hot R&B/Hip-Hop Songs (Billboard)	48

== Certifications ==
Certifications for "Climate"
Region	Certification	Certified units/sales
United States (RIAA)	Gold	500,000^{‡}
^{‡} Sales+streaming figures based on certification alone.
