= Maxo 187 =

Mixtape by Maxo Kream
- Released: March 5, 2015
- Recorded: 2014–2015
- Studio: iMix
- Genre: Trap
- Length: 52:25
- Label: TSO Music Group / Kream Clicc
- Producers: Wolfe De Mçhls; ASAP P on the Boards; Christian Lou; Peso Piddy; Rayayy; Ryan ESL

Maxo Kream chronology
Quicc Strikes (2013)	Maxo 187 (2015)	The Persona Tape (2016)

Singles from Maxo 187
- 1. "Cell Boomin" Released: February 27, 2015

Maxo 187 (stylized as #Maxo187) is the third mixtape by the American rapper Maxo Kream. It was released on March 5, 2015, by TSO Records. The album's release was supported by the release of the single "Cell Boomin" featuring Father. The mixtape has guest appearances by Fredo Santana, Joey Badass and others.

Production was led by Wolfe De Mçhls (also known as Wxlf Gxd) who produced six tracks, including album opener "Thirteen". A number of other trap producers assisted him, including ASAP Mob member ASAP P on the Boards, Ryan ESL and Christian Lou.

Maxo 187 details Kream's teenage experiences in southwest Houston, with accounts of home invasions, robberies and life as a 52 Hoover Gangster Crip. Maxo 187 received generally positive reviews from critics.

== Singles ==
On February 27, 2015, Kream released the mixtape's lead single, "Cell Boomin". Later, the single appeared on Frank Ocean's curated playlist on Spotify, Blonded. In the Pitchfork review of the mixtape, the track was described as a "drug peddler anthem with [a] bouncing flow that explore[s] static thump[s] and a syrupy codeine haze."

== Critical reception ==
Professional ratings
Review scores
Source	Rating
Pitchfork	6.6/10

Maxo 187 was met with generally positive reviews from critics. Patrick Montes of Hypebeast said the mixtape "might be his most fully-formed and developed project yet. From the bombastic, trap-on-steroids production of the intro track to the psychedelic graveyard music of "KKK" and the slow-churned, moody turn-up of "Astrodome," Maxo juxtaposes his ruthless cutthroat-raps with a variety of well-produced, quality beats on Maxo 187." Pitchfork called the record a "sinister and visceral portrait of Houston street life...Maxo 187 doesn't portray cripping as an escape from the hood but a liberation from ordinary life."

== Track listing ==
No.	Title	Producer(s)	Length
1.	"Thirteen"	Wxlf Gxd	3:27
2.	"Paranoia"	ASAP P on the Boards	4:15
3.	"Clientele" (featuring Lamb$ and Ski Mask Malley)	Wxlf Gxd	4:04
4.	"1998 Interlude"		0:27
5.	"1998" (featuring Joey Badass)	Ryan ESL	3:44
6.	"Astrodome" (featuring the Sauce Twinz)	Wxlf Gxd	3:56
7.	"Trap Mami / Flippin'"	Wxlf Gxd	4:12
8.	"Sold Out" (featuring Lil Family)	Ryan ESL	4:00
9.	"FTL Interlude"		0:45
10.	"Murder"	Wxlf Gxd	4:40
11.	"KKK"	A$AP P on the Boards	3:39
12.	"Cell Boomin" (featuring Father)	Wxlf Gxd	3:48
13.	"Endzone" (featuring Le$)	Christian Lou	3:12
14.	"Trigga Maxo"	Christian Lou; Rayayy	2:17
15.	"Issues" (featuring Fredo Santana)	Peso Piddy	5:01
Total length:			52:25
