= Hell at Night =

2025 single by BigXthaPlug featuring Ella Langley

Single by BigXthaPlug featuring Ella Langley

from the album I Hope You're Happy
- Released: August 8, 2025
- Genre: Country rap
- Length: 2:59
- Label: UnitedMasters
- Songwriters: Xavier Landum; Ella Langley; Ryan Vojtesak; Yuval Chain; Krishon Gaines; Rocky Block; RoDarrion Harrison; Joybeth Taylor
- Producers: Charlie Handsome; UV Killin Em; Bandplay

BigXthaPlug singles chronology
"Home" (2025)	"Hell at Night" (2025)	"Cold" (2025)

Ella Langley singles chronology
"Don't Mind If I Do" (2024)	"Hell at Night" (2025)	"Choosin' Texas" (2025)

Visualizer
- "Hell at Night" on YouTube

"Hell at Night" is a song by American rapper BigXthaPlug featuring American country music singer Ella Langley. It was released on August 8, 2025, as the third single from the former's third studio album I Hope You're Happy (2025). The song was produced by Charlie Handsome, UV Killin Em and Bandplay.

== Background ==
BigXthaPlug and Ella Langley both teased the song on the video-sharing app TikTok prior to its release.

== Composition and lyrics ==
The song is a hip-hop and country hybrid. It opens with a "twang-infused" guitar instrumental, which is soon accompanied by hi-hats. Lyrically, it finds both artists in the aftermath of a breakup and wishing harm on their respective previous partners for mistreating them. Ella Langley croons about how she should be moving on peacefully, but is prevented by her anger and frustration, while BigXthaPlug lists off particular misfortunes that he hopes would be inflicted upon his past lover, such as having their heater broken down and car stolen while shopping. The protagonists especially want their former partners to be overcome by guilt to the point of being unable to sleep well at night.

== Critical reception ==
Maxim Mower of Holler described Ella Langley's vocals as "playful" and commented that her "tongue-in-cheek introduction quickly makes way for the fiery hook, which sees the addition of a thunderous beat and some rattling hi-hats". Mower also praised BigXthaPlug's performance, calling his verses as "ferocious as ever" and describing him as "showcasing the charismatic flow we've come to know and love in recent years".

== Charts ==
=== Weekly charts ===
Weekly chart performance for "Hell at Night"
Chart (2025–2026)	Peak position
Canada Hot 100 (Billboard)	44
Global 200 (Billboard)	129
US Billboard Hot 100	26
US Hot Country Songs (Billboard)	8
US Rhythmic Airplay (Billboard)	11

=== Year-end charts ===
Year-end chart performance for "Hell at Night"
Chart (2025)	Position
US Hot Country Songs (Billboard)	76

== Certifications ==
Certifications for "Hell at Night"
Region	Certification	Certified units/sales
New Zealand (RMNZ)	Gold	15,000^{‡}
United States (RIAA)	Platinum	1,000,000^{‡}
^{‡} Sales+streaming figures based on certification alone.
