= Johnny Dang (song) =

2023 single by That Mexican OT, Paul Wall and DRODi

Single by That Mexican OT, Paul Wall and DRODi

from the album Lonestar Luchador
- Released: May 26, 2023
- Genre: Chicano rap
- Length: 3:12
- Label: Manifest; GoodTalk; Good Money Global
- Songwriters: Virgil Gazca; Paul Slayton; Richard Elizondo; Adrian Tobias
- Producers: TobiAli; Jonah Abrams; Jonny Shipes; Darez

That Mexican OT singles chronology
"Slide" (2023)	"Johnny Dang" (2023)	"Fully Automatic" (2023)

Paul Wall singles chronology
"Got That Fire" (2023)	"Johnny Dang" (2023)	"Down Here" (2023)

Drodi singles chronology
"Bow Down" (2023)	"Johnny Dang" (2023)	"Glue" (2023)

Music video
- "Johnny Dang" on YouTube

"Johnny Dang" is a song by American rappers That Mexican OT, Paul Wall and DRODi. It was released on May 26, 2023 as the lead single from the former's album Lonestar Luchador (2023). Produced by TobiAli and Darez, the song is a tribute to the Vietnamese American jeweler of the same name.

== Background ==
In an interview with Billboard, That Mexican OT stated the song came together when he was in his apartment with TobiAli, who played him the beat for the song, which OT decided to use. The lyrics "Louis Vuitton umbrella when I walk through the rain" was inspired by British-American rapper Slick Rick's flow in "Children's Story".

== Release and promotion ==
Prior to the song's release, it was teased on social media earlier in May 2023. The single was released on May 26, 2023. On June 1, 2023, That Mexican OT posted on the video-sharing platform TikTok a clip of himself performing the chorus of the song into a microphone against a background of a pastoral landscape where charrería is taking place, while donning a cowboy hat and oversize Pro Club T-shirt and holding a chicken. The video went viral on social media, propelling OT and the song to prominence.

== Controversy ==
On July 27, 2024, Kyle Beats, a YouTuber and music producer came out with a video stating this song had used a beat from a free drum kit and the beat was made by his friend Darez, however Darez had not been credited. He attempted to get Darez and himself credited for the song and Darez paid during the video. Kyle was not able to get Darez paid due to the song being found on a royalty free drum kit, however Darez was credited and gifted a platinum plaque for the song.

== Music video ==
The music video was released alongside the single. Directed by D Green Filmz and filmed at Johnny Dang's jewelry shop in Houston, it sees That Mexican OT wearing a bejeweled belt, diamond grills, and his signature cowboy hat. He shows off his cars with Paul Wall, Drodi and the artists also hang out under a highway. The video features a cameo from Dang, with whom OT pours Paul Masson cognac.

== Charts ==
=== Weekly charts ===
Chart performance for "Johnny Dang"
Chart (2023)	Peak position
New Zealand Hot Singles (RMNZ)	18
US Billboard Hot 100	65
US Hot R&B/Hip Hop Songs (Billboard)	19
US Rhythmic (Billboard)	28

=== Year-end charts ===
Year-end chart performance for "Johnny Dang"
Chart (2023)	Position
US Hot R&B/Hip-Hop Songs (Billboard)	60

== Certifications ==
Region	Certification	Certified units/sales
New Zealand (RMNZ)	Gold	15,000^{‡}
United States (RIAA)	Platinum	1,000,000^{‡}
^{‡} Sales+streaming figures based on certification alone.
