= Levels (BigXthaPlug song) =

2023 song by BigXthaPlug

Song by BigXthaPlug

from the album Amar
- Released: February 10, 2023
- Genre: Hip-hop
- Length: 2:37
- Label: UnitedMasters
- Songwriters: Xavier Landum; Tony Anderson; Billy Smith
- Producer: Tony Coles

Music video
- "Levels" on YouTube

"Levels" is a song by American rapper BigXthaPlug from his debut studio album Amar (2023). Produced by Tony Coles, it contains a sample of the 1974 song "Remember the Rain" by American R&B group 21st Century.

== Composition and critical reception ==
"Levels" is an upbeat, "soulful" song. BigXthaPlug boasts about his success following his breakout and raps in his signature Texas drawl, over "head-nodding" drums that are "built for slow afternoons cruising in low riders".

== Charts ==
Chart performance for "Levels"
Chart (2024)	Peak position
US Hot R&B/Hip-Hop Songs (Billboard)	41

== Certifications ==
Region	Certification	Certified units/sales
New Zealand (RMNZ)	Platinum	30,000^{‡}
United States (RIAA)	2× Platinum	2,000,000^{‡}
^{‡} Sales+streaming figures based on certification alone.
