= Change Me (BigXthaPlug song) =

2024 single by BigXThaPlug

Single by BigXthaPlug

from the album Take Care
- Released: September 27, 2024
- Genre: Southern hip-hop; trap
- Length: 2:17
- Label: UnitedMasters
- Songwriters: Xavier Landum; Tony Anderson; Krishon Gaines; Charles Forsberg III; Jake Troth
- Producers: Tony Coles; Bandplay; Charley Cooks; Troth

BigXthaPlug singles chronology
"The Largest" (2024)	"Change Me" (2024)	"All the Way" (2025)

Music video
- "Change Me" on YouTube

"Change Me" is a song by American rapper BigXthaPlug, released on September 27, 2024, as the second single from his second studio album, Take Care (2024). It was produced by Tony Coles, Bandplay, Charley Cooks and Jake Troth.

== Composition ==
The song, blending soulful vocals with a trap beat and inspired by 1970s and 1980s hip-hop, focuses on BigXthaPlug's commitment to stay true to himself and maintain his humility and code of conduct despite the challenges regarding superficial which his fame poses. In addition, he reflects on growing up from poverty and rise to prominence.

== Critical reception ==
Shawn Grant of The Source described the song as "marked by his powerful storytelling and introspective lyrics". Preezy Brown of Vibe commented the song "matches its replay value with its meaningful message, scoring another applaudable release from the buzzworthy Texan". Ethan Ijumba of Earmilk wrote, "'Change Me' masterfully blends soulful vocals with hard-hitting trap drums, creating a dynamic sound that perfectly complements the beat. As BigXthaPlug reflects on his humble beginnings, the track captures the raw emotion, southern drawl, and grittiness that propelled him into the spotlight". He additionally stated that "Overall, the soulful sonics blended with southern hip-hop elements find an immaculate balance between BigXthaPlug's powerful verses he delivers".

== Charts ==
=== Weekly charts ===
Weekly chart performance for "Change Me"
Chart (2024)	Peak position
US Billboard Hot 100	79
US Hot R&B/Hip-Hop Songs (Billboard)	23

=== Year-end charts ===
Year-end chart performance for "Change Me"
Chart (2025)	Position
US Hot R&B/Hip-Hop Songs (Billboard)	74

== Certifications ==
Certifications for "Change Me"
Region	Certification	Certified units/sales
New Zealand (RMNZ)	Gold	15,000^{‡}
United States (RIAA)	Gold	500,000^{‡}
^{‡} Sales+streaming figures based on certification alone.
