= Home (BigXthaPlug song) =

2025 single by BigXthaPlug featuring Shaboozey

Single by BigXthaPlug featuring Shaboozey

from the album I Hope You're Happy
- Released: June 27, 2025
- Genre: Country trap
- Length: 2:15
- Label: UnitedMasters
- Songwriters: Xavier Landum; Collins Chibueze; Sean Cook; Bryan Taylor; Dave Cohen; Tony Esterly; Scoot Teasley; Krishon Gaines; Charles Forsberg
- Producers: Charley Cooks; Bandplay; Cohen; Esterly; Cook

BigXthaPlug singles chronology
"All the Way" (2025)	"Home" (2025)	"Hell at Night" (2025)

Shaboozey singles chronology
"Blink Twice" (2025)	"Home" (2025)	"Took a Walk" (2025)

Music video
- "Home" on YouTube

"Home" is a song by American rapper BigXthaPlug featuring American singer and rapper Shaboozey. It was released on June 27, 2025, as the second single from the former's third studio album I Hope You're Happy (2025). The song was produced by Charley Cooks, Bandplay, Dave Cohen, Tony Esterly and Sean Cook.

== Background ==
The song was first teased in May 2025, when BigXthaPlug posted a video of him creating the song and calling Shaboozey to say, "It's time".

== Composition ==
"Home" is a country trap song. The production contains acoustic guitar and soft claps, staying minimal during the beginning of the song. 808s and trap kicks and snares arrive when BigXthaPlug enters. Lyrically, the song is about lost love and realizing one's own mistakes, as well as a desire to be forgiven and return to one's lover. In addition, it combines with the theme of literally being on the road and finding one's way home. Shaboozey describes his emotional pain as he drives away and leaves the relationship in the first verse. The chorus finds him feeling lonely as he is on the highway. BigXthaPlug raps about moving on and taking accountability for his mistakes, such as taking love for granted, which he details in the second verse. In the third verse, he is ready to make amends and seeks another chance with his lover.

== Critical reception ==
The song was well-received by music critics. Delaina Dixon of Chron commented "Like his previous single with Bailey Zimmerman, the combination of the two genres sounds is pulled off pretty seamlessly, as expected when featuring Shaboozey, who is no stranger to blending trap and country. The pair created a banger of a song, and this might be even better than the pair's first collab, "Drink Don't Need No Mix" off Shaboozey's 2024 album, Where I've Been, Isn't Where I'm Going." Bryson "Boom" Paul of HotNewHipHop wrote "The track rides on rolling trap drums and warm acoustic layers. Shaboozey’s country-tinged vocals glide over the beat, adding depth and soul. The production balances swagger and intimacy while exploring themes of home, belonging, and redemption. It feels fresh yet familiar—like returning to a place that shaped you." Preezy Brown of Vibe stated "'Home' blends Southern grit with country soul, driven by a twangy groove that highlights both artists' emotional depth. Shaboozey's aching chorus—'Last thing you see is smoke because I'm moving on'—pairs seamlessly with BigX's introspective bars." He also commented, "'Home' is not only a smart genre crossover, it's a confident reminder of BigXthaPlug's range".

== Music video ==
The music video was released alongside the single. BigXthaPlug and Shaboozey filmed it on June 17, 2025, on the Margaret Hunt Hill Bridge. The video was directed by Jerry Morka. It depicts BigXthaPlug and Shaboozey embarking on a road trip before BigXthaPlug receives a message asking him to return home and reconcile with his partner.

== Charts ==
Chart performance for "Home"
Chart (2025)	Peak position
Canada Hot 100 (Billboard)	90
New Zealand Hot Singles (RMNZ)	23
US Billboard Hot 100	77
US Hot Country Songs (Billboard)	26
