= Mmhmm (song) =

2023 single by BigXthaPlug

Single by BigXthaPlug

from the EP The Biggest and the album Take Care
- Released: October 6, 2023
- Length: 1:59
- Label: UnitedMasters
- Songwriters: Xavier Landum; Krishon Gaines; Charles Forsberg III
- Producers: Bandplay; Charley Cooks

BigXthaPlug singles chronology
"Switcharoo 2" (2023)	"Mmhmm" (2023)	"'02 Lakers" (2023)

"Mmhmm" is a song by American rapper BigXthaPlug, released on October 6, 2023, as the lead single from his EP The Biggest (2023). Produced by Bandplay and Charley Cooks, it contains a sample of "And the Beat Goes On" by The Whispers and is BigXthaPlug's first song to chart on the Billboard Hot 100, debuting at number 93 and peaking at number 63. The song was later included on his second studio album Take Care (2024).

== Background ==
Bandplay produced the beat of the song in 2020 after hearing "And the Beat Goes On" while watching a movie. BigXthaPlug recalled that when Bandplay played him the beat, he and songwriter Ro$ama started dancing, and neither of them knew what the sample was. BigXthaPlug had written the second verse for the song and Ro$ama wrote the opening verse upon his request. The composition of the song was finished in 30 minutes. After an unreleased version of the song became widely played in nightclub venues, licensing rights with UnitedMasters was dealt with in the summer of 2023. The song was officially released to streaming services in October 2023. The video-sharing app TikTok has contributed to the popularity of the song, which has been used in over 20,000 clips on the platform.

== Composition ==
"Mmhmm" contains a bumping bass in the production, while BigXthaPlug boasts his wealth and performs through a bellowing voice. The title of the song is used as an ad-lib throughout the chorus.

== Remix ==
An official remix of the song featuring American rapper Finesse2tymes was released on December 1, 2023, as a track from The Biggest.

== Live performances ==
On April 22, 2025, BigXthaPlug performed a medley of "Mmhmm" and "The Largest" on Jimmy Kimmel Live!.

== Charts ==
=== Weekly charts ===
Weekly chart performance
Chart (2023–2024)	Peak position
US Billboard Hot 100	63
US Hot R&B/Hip-Hop Songs (Billboard)	11

=== Year-end charts ===
Year-end chart performance
Chart (2024)	Position
US Hot R&B/Hip-Hop Songs (Billboard)	37

== Certifications ==
Certifications
Region	Certification	Certified units/sales
United States (RIAA)	3× Platinum	3,000,000^{‡}
^{‡} Sales+streaming figures based on certification alone.
