= Tay Money =

American rapper and singer from Texas

- Born: Taylor Noelle Watson; April 6, 1993 (age 33); Tyler, Texas, U.S.
- Origin: Dallas, Texas, U.S.
- Genres: Hip hop; trap
- Occupations: Rapper; songwriter
- Years active: 2017–present
- Labels: Geffen; Interscope

Taylor Noelle Watson (born April 6, 1993), better known by her stage name Tay Money, is an American rapper. She started her career in 2017, and gained fame after the release of her single "Trappers Delight" in June 2018.

Watson then released her debut EP, DUH!. Her debut mixtape, Hurricane Tay was released in March 2019, the following year she released her single, "Bussin" which became a viral sensation on video sharing network TikTok. It reached #41 on the U.S. Viral 50. In 2021, she signed a record deal with Geffen Records and Interscope Records. She released a song with fellow rapper, Kidd G in early 2026, named F-180.

== Biography ==
Taylor Noelle Watson was born in Tyler, Texas on April 6, 1993, she later moved to Dallas. Watson worked as a hair stylist. She had grown up on a ranch and used to play softball.

Watson made her debut with the single "Lewis & Clark" in 2017, she later released the single "Na Na". Her breakthrough came with the 2018 single "Trapper's Delight", which was released on WorldStarHipHop's YouTube channel. The music video received over 1.2 million views in less than a month. She released her debut EP, DUH!, on November of that year.

In 2019, she released the singles "High School", "2k", "Ride Around", and "IMAX". In that same year, her debut mixtape, Hurricane Tay, was released with 16 tracks and two features from DaBaby and YNW Melly. In March 2020, Watson released her viral single "Bussin", which has gained widespread attention in social media, especially on the video sharing platform TikTok. In July 2020, Watson released "Bussin"'s remix, titled "Bussin 2.0" with rapper Saweetie. On October 2, 2020, Watson released the music video for "Circus", which was directed by DrewFilmedIt. She released her debut mixtape, Blockedt, on December 11 of that year. It features Saweetie on the remix "Bussin 2.0" and Mulatto on "Brat", which was released on October.

In 2021, Watson signed a record deal with Geffen Records and Interscope Records. She also announced working on her debut studio album.

== Media ==
Watson was featured on D Magazine's "10 North Texas Hip-Hop Artists to Watch in 2020" list.

== Discography ==
=== Mixtapes and extended plays ===
List of mixtapes and EPs with selected details
Title	Details
DUH!	Released: 16 November 2018; Label: Tay Money; Format: Digital download, streaming
Hurricane Tay	Released: 6 December 2019; Label: Tay Money; Format: Digital download, streaming
Blockedt	Released: 11 December 2020; Label: Rebel, Geffen Records; Format: Digital download, streaming
Girls Gone Duh	Released: 22 April 2022; Label: Rebel, Geffen Records; Format: Digital download, streaming
Like A Boss	Released: 13 December 2024; Label: Tay Money; Format: Digital download, streaming
Baddie Christmas	Released: 28 November 2025; Label: Hitmaker Music Group; Format: Digital download, streaming
