= The Largest (song) =

2024 single by BigXThaPlug

Single by BigXthaPlug

from the album Take Care
- Released: August 9, 2024
- Genre: Hip-hop; trap
- Length: 2:12
- Label: UnitedMasters
- Songwriters: Xavier Landum; Krishon Gaines; Tony Anderson; Charles Miller; Harold Ray Brown; Howard E. Scott; Leroy Jordan; Lee Oskar; Morris Dickerson; RoDarrion Harrison; Thomas Allen
- Producers: Bandplay; Tony Coles

BigXthaPlug singles chronology
"AR" (2024)	"The Largest" (2024)	"Change Me" (2024)

Music video
- "The Largest" on YouTube

"The Largest" is a song by American rapper BigXthaPlug, released on August 9, 2024 as the lead single from his second studio album, Take Care (2024). Produced by Bandplay and Tony Coles, it contains samples of "Slippin' into Darkness" by War.

== Content ==
BigXthaPlug raps about the extent of his success. In the second verse, he boasts about his resulting wealth.

== Live performances ==
On April 22, 2025, BigXthaPlug performed a medley of "The Largest" and "Mmhmm" on Jimmy Kimmel Live!.

== Other uses ==
The song was used on Beyoncé's Cowboy Carter Tour as a part in the interlude "ATTACK OF THE 400 FOOT COWBOY".

== Charts ==
Chart performance for "The Largest"
Chart (2024–2025)	Peak position
US Billboard Hot 100	71
US Hot R&B/Hip-Hop Songs (Billboard)	16
US Rhythmic (Billboard)	9

== Certifications ==
Certifications for "The Largest"
Region	Certification	Certified units/sales
New Zealand (RMNZ)	Platinum	30,000^{‡}
United States (RIAA)	Platinum	1,000,000^{‡}
^{‡} Sales+streaming figures based on certification alone.
