= Maxo Kream =

American rapper (born 1990)

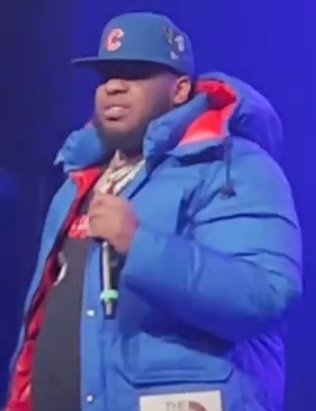
- Maxo Kream performing in 2022

Background information
- Also known as: Maxo; Trigga Maxo
- Born: Emekwanem Ogugua Biosah Jr. March 29, 1990 (age 36); Houston, Texas, U.S.
- Genres: Southern hip-hop; trap
- Occupations: Rapper; songwriter
- Years active: 2012–present
- Labels: 88 Classic; Big Persona; RCA; Roc Nation; TSO

Emekwanem Ogugua Biosah Jr. (born March 29, 1990), known professionally as Maxo Kream, is a Nigerian-American rapper. His debut album Punken was released in 2018. His follow-up and major label debut, Brandon Banks, was released in 2019 and peaked at number 68 on the Billboard 200.

Maxo Kream is known for his honest lyricism, speaking to his past life living in poor neighborhoods within Houston, Texas. He is a member of the 52 Hoover Crips.

Throughout his career, Maxo Kream has collaborated with artists such as Travis Scott, Playboi Carti, Tyler, the Creator, ASAP Rocky, Don Toliver, J. Cole, Lil Uzi Vert, Megan Thee Stallion, Anderson .Paak, Suicideboys, Wale, Denzel Curry, BigXthaPlug, Schoolboy Q, and JPEGMAFIA, alongside others. His younger brother, KCG Josh, is also a rapper.

== Early life ==
Biosah was primarily raised in Southwest Houston and also lived in nearby Sugar Land and Missouri City. He attended Alief Hastings High School and Kempner High School. He is of Nigerian descent through his father, who ran an ethnic grocery store in Alief, Houston. Biosah began rapping in high school as part of the group Kream Clicc. He became affiliated with the Forum Park Crips, a subset of the 52 Hoover Gangster Crips.

== Career ==
In 2012, he started to gain popularity after releasing a remix of Kendrick Lamar's "Rigamortus" on YouTube. His early mixtapes Retro Card and Quicc Strikes pushed him into the limelight, hitting over 85,000 hits on LiveMixtapes. In 2013, he supported Chief Keef on the Texas leg of his tour.

His 2015 mixtape #Maxo187 received attention from XXL Magazine and Pitchfork among others. He followed it up in 2016 with The Persona Tape.

In 2018, he released his debut album Punken. On June 27, 2019, he signed a deal with Roc Nation. On July 19, 2019, he released his major label debut, Brandon Banks via Big Persona/88 Classic/RCA Records.

On October 18, 2021, he released his second major label album Weight of the World. The album largely focuses on Maxo's experience since popularity, and dealing with the death of his brother Money-Du. Money-Du was murdered on March 9, 2020, in Los Angeles. He released his fourth studio album, Personification, in November 2024. He released O.Y.N, an album produced by JPEGMafia, in June 2026.

== Legal issues ==
On October 22, 2016, Maxo Kream was arrested and charged under the Racketeer Influenced and Corrupt Organizations Act as part of a joint investigation between the Fort Bend County Sheriff's Office and the United States Postal Inspection Service. He, along with seven other members of the Kream Clicc Gang, held charges sourcing from money laundering, possession of 85 pounds of mariijuana, 2,000 Xanax pills, 13 firearms, cash, and drug manufacturing/distribution paraphernalia. Maxo was held at Fort Bend County Jail in Richmond, Texas. He was released on bail of $200,000 the next day and denied the allegations, claiming to only be "organizing his music". In 2018, he claimed on an Instagram post that the case had been resolved in his favor.

Maxo Kream turned himself in to authorities on April 3, 2023, for RICO related charges.

On June 27, 2025, Maxo Kream was arrested following a traffic stop in Harris County, Texas and charged with evading arrest and unlawful carrying of firearms by a registered gang member. The case was dismissed on November 7, 2025 as part of a prosecutorial agreement that included forfeiture of the firearms.

== Discography ==
=== Studio albums ===
List of albums, with selected details
Title	Details	Peak chart positions
Title	Details	US
Punken	Released: January 12, 2018; Label: Kream Clicc, TSO; Format: Digital download, streaming	—
Brandon Banks	Released: July 19, 2019; Label: Big Persona, 88 Classic, RCA, Roc Nation; Format: Digital download, streaming	68
Weight of the World	Released: October 18, 2021; Label: RCA; Format: Digital download, streaming	—
Personification	Released: November 8, 2024; Label: Persona Money Gang, Stomp Down; Format: Digital download, streaming	—
O.Y.N	Released: June 26, 2026; Label: Persona Money Global, Empire; Format: Digital download, streaming	

=== Mixtapes ===
List of mixtapes, with selected details
Title	Details
Retro Card	Released: April 9, 2012; Label: Self-released; Format: Digital download
Quicc Strikes	Released: September 30, 2013; Label: Self-released; Format: Digital download
#Maxo187	Released: March 5, 2015; Label: TSO Records; Format: Digital download
The Persona Tape	Released: June 28, 2016; Label: Kream Clicc, TSO; Format: Digital download

=== Singles ===
==== As lead artist ====
List of singles as lead artist, with showing year released and album name
Title	Year	Album
"Cell Boomin" (featuring Father)	2015	#Maxo187
"Thirteen"	2015	#Maxo187
"Out the Door" (featuring KEY!)	2015	The Persona Tape
"Shop"	2015	The Persona Tape
"Grannies"	2017	Punken
"5200"	2017	Punken
"Bussdown"	2017	Punken
"Mars" (featuring Lil Uzi Vert)	2017	Non-album single
"Meet Again"	2019	Brandon Banks
"Still"	2019	Brandon Banks
"She Live" (featuring Megan Thee Stallion)	2019	Brandon Banks
"Big Persona" (featuring Tyler, the Creator)	2021	Weight of the World
"Cee Cee" (featuring Monaleo)	2021	Weight of the World
"Bang The Bus"	2024	Personification
"Talkin In Screw" (featuring That Mexican OT)	2024	Personification
"Cracc Era" (featuring Tyler, the Creator)	2024	Personification
"Fake Jeezy" (featuring Denzel Curry and JPEGMafia)	2026	O.Y.N
"Time Out"	2026	O.Y.N

==== As featured artist ====
List of singles as featured artist, with showing year released and album name
Title	Year	Album
"Flexin" (J $tash featuring Maxo Kream)	2014	Non-album single
"Fetti" (Playboi Carti featuring Da$H and Maxo Kream)	2015	Non-album single
"Super" (Yarbro the Dragon featuring Maxo Kream and Alief Biggie)	2016	Non-album single

=== Guest appearances ===
List of non-single guest appearances, with other performing artists, showing year released and album name
Title	Year	Artist(s)	Album
"Flex Hard" (Remix)	2014	YF, Katie Got Bandz	I Am YF
"Mary and Molly"	2015	Dice SoHo	Icey Life
"7 Day Theory"	2015	Dash	SkrewFace
"16 Speakers"	2015	Chuck Inglish, Caleb James, Fat Tony	Everybody's Big Brother
"She Fuckin'"	2015	Les	Steak x Shrimp 2
"Chopper"	2016	Fredo Santana, 808 Mafia	Fredo Mafia
"Pull Up"	2017	Trae tha Truth	Tha Truth, Pt. 3
"Hole in My Heart"	2017	AD	Blue 89 C2
"Pictures"	2017	Suicideboys	Kill Yourself Part XV: The Coast of Ashes Saga
"Moral"	2018	IDK	IDK & Friends :)
"Oh Wow...Swerve"	2019	Dreamville	Revenge of the Dreamers III
"Brazy Crazy"	2019	Sauce Walka	Sauce Ghetto Gospel 2
"Izayah"	2019	Guapdad 4000, Denzel Curry, KEY!	Dior Deposits
"I Was Trappin"	2020	Peso Peso	Salsa
"Bulletproof"	2020	IDK, Denzel Curry	IDK & Friends 2 (Basketball County soundtrack)
"What's The Move"	2020	Wiz Khalifa, SNSTBLVD	The Saga of Wiz Khalifa (Deluxe)
"Goons"	2025	Hanumankind	Monsoon Season
