= BigXthaPlug =

American rapper (born 1998)

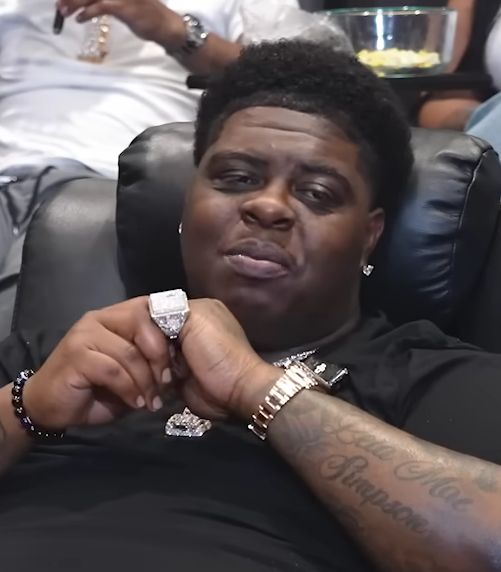
- Landum in 2026

Background information
- Born: Xavier Landum; May 12, 1998 (age 28); Dallas, Texas, US
- Genres: Hip-hop; Southern hip-hop; trap; country rap
- Occupations: Rapper; songwriter
- Years active: 2019–present
- Label: UnitedMasters
- Publisher: Sony Music Publishing

Xavier Landum (born May 12, 1998), better known by his stage name BigXthaPlug, is an American rapper and songwriter. Signed to UnitedMasters of Brooklyn, New York City, he first rose to prominence for songs including "Texas" and "Mmhmm".

== Early life ==
Xavier Landum was born on May 12, 1998, in Dallas, Texas, and grew up in a challenging environment, the son of street-dwellers. He recalls an early childhood marked by extremes. At age four or five, Landum witnessed his mother, whom he describes as a "gangsta", shoot at a would-be thief during an attempted robbery. While his mother was his best friend, his father took on the role of disciplinarian. Both parents introduced him to a variety of music, from the Isley Brothers and UGK to Drake and Lil Wayne, influencing his eclectic taste.

Landum struggled in school from a young age, frequently skipping classes and getting into fights. By age nine, he moved to Commerce, Texas to live with his father. Football became an outlet for his aggression, and his skills on the field eventually earned him attention from Division 1 scouts. In 2016, after graduating from Ferris High School in Ferris, Texas, he enrolled at Crown College in Laketown Township, Minnesota.

Landum began selling marijuana to students at college which led to police discovering marijuana in his dormitory room. He was given a ticket and expelled from the school, ending his collegiate football ambitions.

Unable to find stable employment, Landum turned to robbing drug dealers, among other things. He was arrested right before his 18th birthday on a warrant for aggravated robbery. He violated his probation two years later and went back to jail, missing his son's first birthday—a moment which deeply impacted him. While in solitary confinement, he battled boredom and frustration, leading him to write his first raps on a jail-issued medical form. After being released, Landum pursued music seriously, paying for studio time with money from street hustles and recording his first mixtape, Bacc from the Dead.

== Career ==
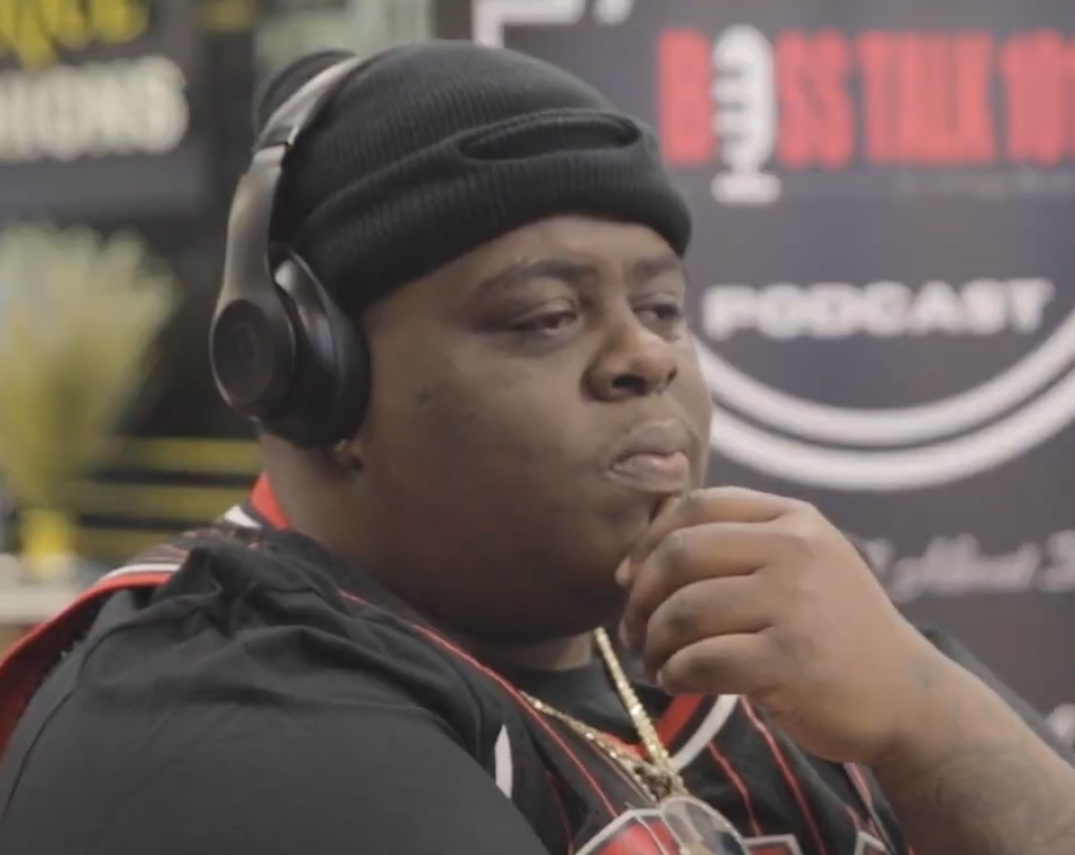
BigXthaPlug in 2023

In 2022, he was arrested for illegal possession of weapons and marijuana and was in jail, where he wrote songs while in solitary confinement. After his release from prison, he released Amar, his debut album named after his son. It came out in February 2023 and includes the single "Texas", which was certified Gold by the RIAA. He launched his own label 600 Entertainment in 2023, signing rappers Ro$ama and Yung Hood.

In October 2023, he released the single "Mmhmm". The song debuted at 93rd and reached the 65th position on the Billboard Hot 100 two months after its release, after a remix with Finesse2tymes was featured on his EP The Biggest. In 2023, he went on the Don't Mess With Texas Tour. On August 21, 2026, Landum was arrested in Texas on DWI, marijuana, and gun-related charges one day before his Iowa State Fair Show.

== Personal life ==
Landum has a son, Amar, age 6 as of 2025. In April 2025, he filmed a video with the Autism Society of America about his relationship with his son, who has autism, as part of Autism Acceptance Month.

On August 21, 2026, Landum was arrested in Allen, Texas and charged with driving while intoxicated, possession of marijuana, and illegal possession of a firearm.

== Discography ==
=== Studio albums ===
List of studio albums, with selected details and chart positions
Title	Studio album details	Peak chart positions						Certifications
Title	Studio album details	US	US R&B/HH	US Country	AUS	CAN	NZ	Certifications
Amar	Released: February 10, 2023; Label: UnitedMasters; Format: CD, digital download, streaming	97	40	—	—	—	—	RIAA: Platinum
Take Care	Released: October 11, 2024; Label: UnitedMasters; Format: CD, digital download, streaming	8	3	—	—	63	24	RIAA: Platinum
I Hope You're Happy	Released: August 22, 2025; Label: UnitedMasters; Format: CD, LP, digital download, streaming	7	―	2	56	17	―	RIAA: Gold
Better Over Time	Released: October 30, 2026; Label: UnitedMasters; Format: CD, LP, digital download, streaming	7	2	―	―	―	―	

=== Mixtapes ===
Title	Mixtape details	Peak chart positions
Title	Mixtape details	US
6WA (with Ro$ama, MurdaGang PB and Yung Hood)	Released: March 20, 2026; Label: 600 Entertainment, UnitedMasters; Format: LP, digital download, streaming	118

=== Extended plays ===
List of EPs, with selected details and chart positions
Title	EP details	Peak chart positions		Certifications
Title	EP details	US	US R&B/HH	Certifications
Bacc from the Dead	Released: December 14, 2020; Label: Self-released; Format: Digital download, streaming	—	—	
Big Stepper	Released: July 8, 2022; Label: UnitedMasters; Format: Digital download, streaming	—	—	
The Biggest	Released: December 1, 2023; Label: UnitedMasters; Format: Digital download, streaming	111	47	RIAA: Gold
Meet the 6ixers (with Ro$ama and Yung Hood)	Released: May 10, 2024; Label: UnitedMasters; Format: Digital download, streaming	—	—	

=== Singles ===
List of singles, with selected chart positions, showing year released, certifications and album name
Title	Year	Peak chart positions					Certifications	Album
Title	Year	US	US R&B/HH	US Country	CAN	WW	Certifications	Album
"Who Am I"	2019	—	—	—	—	—		Non-album singles
"Came Thru"	2019	—	—	—	—	—		Non-album singles
"Mula"	2019	—	—	—	—	—		Bacc from the Dead
"The Plug"	2019	—	—	—	—	—		Non-album singles
"ZaZa" (featuring Ybgrone)	2021	—	—	—	—	—		Non-album singles
"Strange Fruit" (featuring Ro$ama)	2021	—	—	—	—	—		Non-album singles
"Soul Cry" (featuring Ybgrone)	2021	—	—	—	—	—		Non-album singles
"Feeling Like Dennis"	2021	—	—	—	—	—		Non-album singles
"Mr. Trouble"	2021	—	—	—	—	—		Non-album singles
"Big Stepper"	2021	—	—	—	—	—		Non-album singles
"The Truth" (featuring Ro$ama)	2021	—	—	—	—	—		Non-album singles
"The Man"	2021	—	—	—	—	—		Non-album singles
"Safehouse"	2021	—	—	—	—	—	RIAA: Gold	Big Stepper
"I Like" (featuring Ro$ama)	2022	—	—	—	—	—		Non-album single
"New Day"	2022	—	—	—	—	—		Big Stepper
"Enemies" (featuring Ro$ama)	2022	—	—	—	—	—		Big Stepper
"Rap Niggas" (featuring Ro$ama)	2022	—	—	—	—	—	RIAA: Gold	Big Stepper
"Active"	2022	—	—	—	—	—		Big Stepper
"We from Texas" (with Rizzoo Rizzoo)	2022	—	—	—	—	—		Non-album singles
"Safehouse (Remix)" (with Maxo Kream)	2022	—	—	—	—	—		Non-album singles
"I Know" (with Sauce Walka)	2022	—	—	—	—	—		Amar
"Texas"	2022	— (Note: "Texas" did not enter the Billboard Hot 100, but peaked at number 16 on the Bubbling Under Hot 100 chart.)	38	—	—	—	RIAA: 2× Platinum; RMNZ: Platinum	Amar
"BigXmas"	2022	—	—	—	—	—		Non-album single
"Primetime"	2023	—	—	—	—	—		Amar
"Boy" (with Big Yavo)	2023	—	—	—	—	—	RIAA: Gold	Non-album single
"Mmhmm"	2023	63	11	—	—	—	RIAA: 3× Platinum; RMNZ: Platinum	The Biggest and Take Care
"'02 Lakers" (featuring Ro$ama)	2023	—	—	—	—	—		The Biggest
"Meet the 6ixers" (with Ro$ama and Yung Hood)	2024	—	—	—	—	—	RIAA: Gold	Meet the 6ixers
"The Largest"	2024	71	16	—	—	—	RIAA: Platinum; RMNZ: Platinum	Take Care
"Change Me"	2024	79	23	—	—	—	RIAA: Gold	Take Care
"All the Way" (featuring Bailey Zimmerman)	2025	4	—	1	21	23	RIAA: 2× Platinum; RMNZ: Gold	I Hope You're Happy
"Home" (with Shaboozey)	2025	77	—	26	90	—		I Hope You're Happy
"Hell at Night" (featuring Ella Langley)	2025	26	—	8	44	129	RIAA: Platinum; RMNZ: Gold	I Hope You're Happy
"Cold" (featuring Post Malone)	2025	82	—	19	73	—		I Hope You're Happy
"6WA" (with Ro$ama, MurdaGang PB and Yung Hood)	2026	— (Note: "6WA" did not enter the Billboard Hot 100, but peaked at number 20 on the Bubbling Under Hot 100 chart.)	35	—	—	—		6WA
"Lite" (with Belly Gang Kushington)	2026	— (Note: "Lite" did not enter the Billboard Hot 100, but peaked at number 7 on the Bubbling Under Hot 100 chart.)	27	—	—	—		Better Over Time
"Burn" (with Ava Max)	2026	70	14	—	—	—		Better Over Time

=== Other charted and certified songs ===
List of other charted songs, with selected chart positions, showing year released, certifications and album name
Title	Year	Peak chart positions				Certifications	Album
Title	Year	US	US R&B/HH	US Country	CAN	Certifications	Album
"Levels"	2023	—	41	—	—	RIAA: 2× Platinum; RMNZ: Gold	Amar
"Whip It"	2023	—	—	—	—	RIAA: Gold; RMNZ: Gold	Amar
"Left Eye"	2023	—	—	—	—	RIAA: Gold	Amar
"Hit List" (with That Mexican OT and Big Yavo)	2023	—	—	—	—	RIAA: Gold	Lonestar Luchador
"Back on My BS"	2023	95	32	—	—	RIAA: Platinum; RMNZ: Gold	The Biggest and Take Care
"Climate" (with Offset)	2023	—	48	—	—	RIAA: Gold	The Biggest
"Pistol Paccin" (NLE Choppa featuring BigXthaPlug)	2024	— (Note: "Pistol Paccin" did not enter the Billboard Hot 100, but peaked at number 25 on the Bubbling Under Hot 100 chart.)	47	—	—	RIAA: Gold	Cottonwood 2.0 (Deluxe 2.0)
"Drink Don't Need No Mix" (Shaboozey featuring BigXthaPlug)	2024	—	45	47	—		Where I've Been, Isn't Where I'm Going
"Take Care"	2024	— (Note: "Take Care" did not enter the Billboard Hot 100, but peaked at number three on the Bubbling Under Hot 100 chart.)	36	—	—		Take Care
"Lost the Love"	2024	— (Note: "Lost the Love" did not enter the Billboard Hot 100, but peaked at number 17 on the Bubbling Under Hot 100 chart.)	47	—	—		Take Care
"Leave Me Alone"	2024	96	33	—	—		Take Care
"Therapy Session"	2024	— (Note: "Therapy Session" did not enter the Billboard Hot 100, but peaked at number 12 on the Bubbling Under Hot 100 chart.)	46	—	—		Take Care
"Law & Order"	2024	— (Note: "Law & Order" did not enter the Billboard Hot 100, but peaked at number 24 on the Bubbling Under Hot 100 chart.)	49	—	—		Take Care
"2AM"	2024	64	18	—	—	RIAA: Platinum	Take Care
"Holy Ground" (with Jessie Murph)	2025	— (Note: "Holy Ground" did not enter the Billboard Hot 100, but peaked at number two on the Bubbling Under Hot 100 chart.)	26	—	—		Take Care
"Hip-Hop" (with Lil Wayne featuring Jay Jones)	2025	36	8	—	—		Tha Carter VI
"I Hope You're Happy" (featuring Darius Rucker)	2025	— (Note: "I Hope You're Happy" did not enter the Billboard Hot 100, but peaked at number five on the Bubbling Under Hot 100 chart.)	—	33	—		I Hope You're Happy
"Box Me Up" (featuring Jelly Roll)	2025	61	—	18	88		I Hope You're Happy
"Pray Hard" (featuring Luke Combs)	2025	— (Note: "Pray Hard" did not enter the Billboard Hot 100, but peaked at number one on the Bubbling Under Hot 100 chart.)	—	30	—		I Hope You're Happy
"About You" (featuring Tucker Wetmore)	2025	— (Note: "About You" did not enter the Billboard Hot 100, but peaked at number 17 on the Bubbling Under Hot 100 chart.)	—	41	—		I Hope You're Happy
"6ixer Party" (with Snoop Dogg, Ro$ama, MurdaGang PB and Yung Hood)	2026	—	44	—	—		6WA
"No Limit" (featuring Leon Thomas)	2026	— (Note: "No Limit" did not enter the Billboard Hot 100, but peaked at number 18 on the Bubbling Under Hot 100 chart.)	34	—	—		Better Over Time
"I Get It"	2026	—	38	—	—		Better Over Time
"Cracced"	2026	—	40	—	—		Better Over Time
"Da Fucc" (featuring Ro$ama)	2026	—	37	—	—		Better Over Time
"Believe" (featuring Babyface Ray and Lil Yachty)	2026	—	48	—	—		Better Over Time
"I Like It" (featuring Loe Shimmy)	2026	75	18	—	—		Better Over Time
"Give It All"	2026	— (Note: "Give It All" did not enter the Billboard Hot 100, but peaked at number 9 on the Bubbling Under Hot 100 chart.)	31	—	—		Better Over Time
"FAF" (featuring GloRilla)	2026	—	42	—	—		Better Over Time
