= Johnny Dang =

Vietnamese American jeweler

- Born: Đặng Anh Tuấn; 1973 (age 52–53); Đắk Lắk, South Vietnam
- Other name: TV Johnny
- Occupation: Jeweler
- Spouse: Jennifer Dang
- Website: johnnydangandco.com

Johnny Dang (born Đặng Anh Tuấn; 1973) is a Vietnamese American jeweler based in Houston, Texas, who is known for his custom grills and involvement in the American hip-hop scene. He is a founder of Johnny Dang and Co.

== Biography ==
Dang was born Đặng Anh Tuấn in the Đắk Lắk Province of what was once South Vietnam near the end of the Vietnam War. Dang's grandfather and father both worked in the jewelry trade. In 1987, Dang's father left Vietnam and emigrated to the United States. In 1996, Dang and his family followed his father to Houston. He was 23 years old. He began working in jewelry repair with his brother at a Houston flea market.

Dang opened his first store, TV Jewelry, in the Sharpstown Mall in 1998. He found a niche in making jeweled grills for clients. After making a grill for rapper Paul Wall, the two went into business together in 2002. In 2016, Dang moved his business from the Sharpstown Mall to a stand-alone location.

In 2021, Dang broke off his business relationship with Vietnamese YouTuber Khoa Pug after the price of their mutually held cryptocurrency dropped.

== In popular culture ==
Dang has been referenced in musical recordings by Migos, Travis Scott, Gucci Mane, Lil Pump, Keith Ape, Chief Keef, and 21 Savage, among others. He was the subject of the 2023 song "Johnny Dang" by That Mexican OT, Paul Wall, and Drodi. He features in the music video.

He has additionally appeared in music videos for songs such as "Gucci Bandanna" by Soulja Boy, Gucci Mane, and Shawty Lo, "Grillz" by Nelly, "Wild Boy" by Machine Gun Kelly, "No Angel" by Beyoncé, "We Takin' Over" by DJ Khaled, "And I Still" by Rod Wave, "Ice Tray" by Quavo and Lil Yachty, "Ice Cream Paint Job" by Dorrough, and "Bigger in Texas" by Megan Thee Stallion.

Dang himself provided vocals for the song "Stay Iced Up" off Paul Wall's 2010 album Heart of a Champion.
