= Texas (BigXthaPlug song) =

2022 single by BigXthaPlug

Single by BigXthaPlug

from the album Amar
- Released: November 25, 2022
- Genre: Southern hip-hop; trap
- Length: 2:26
- Label: UnitedMasters
- Songwriters: Xavier Landum; Vladislav Zabornikov; Miltiadis Partalis; Vladimir Vasilev; Shuggie Otis
- Producers: Aimonmyneck; Blondobeats; Blazerfxme

BigXthaPlug singles chronology
| "Legendary" (2022) | "Texas" (2022) | "BigXmas" (2022) |

Music video
- "Texas" on YouTube

"Texas" is a song by American rapper BigXthaPlug released in 2022, as the fourth single from his debut studio album Amar (2023). Produced by Aimonmyneck, Blondobeats, and Blazerfxme, the track is considered as one of the first songs that helped BigXthaPlug gain recognition.

== Background ==
In an interview with Complex, BigXthaPlug revealed his initial thoughts about the song: "I actually didn't even like the song at first. I didn't like the beat. It was just something that my team felt would be good, like, 'Hey, this could spark up something'. I believed in them and we did it in and now here we are".

== Composition ==
The song incorporates a "mix of gospel, trap, country, and blues" and finds BigXthaPlug rapping about what Texas is known for, including the cars and lifestyles.

== Critical reception ==
Max Bell of Spin wrote, '"BigX displays some of his best writing on 'Texas', casually condensing decades of Texas music and cultural history into forceful couplets". Bryson "Boom" Paul of The Source wrote, "And with it's [sic] inescapable hook, tongue-in-cheek lyricism, and undeniable energy, 'Texas' is an anthem that will cement BigXThaPlug's legacy in music forever".

== Music video ==
The music video was directed by Jerry Morka and released alongside the single. It sees BigXthaPlug flaunting his cowboy hat, swangers and diamond encrusted necklaces.

== Charts ==
=== Weekly charts ===
Weekly chart performance for "Texas"
| Chart (2024–2025) | Peak position |
|---|---|
| US Bubbling Under Hot 100 (Billboard) | 16 |
| US Hot R&B/Hip-Hop Songs (Billboard) | 38 |

=== Year-end charts ===
2024 year-end chart performance for "Texas"
| Chart (2024) | Position |
|---|---|
| US Hot R&B/Hip-Hop Songs (Billboard) | 92 |

== Certifications ==
Certifications for "Texas"
| Region | Certification | Certified units/sales |
|---|---|---|
| New Zealand (RMNZ) | Platinum | 30,000^{‡} |
| United States (RIAA) | 2× Platinum | 2,000,000^{‡} |
^{‡} Sales+streaming figures based on certification alone.
