= That Mexican OT =

American rapper (born 1999)

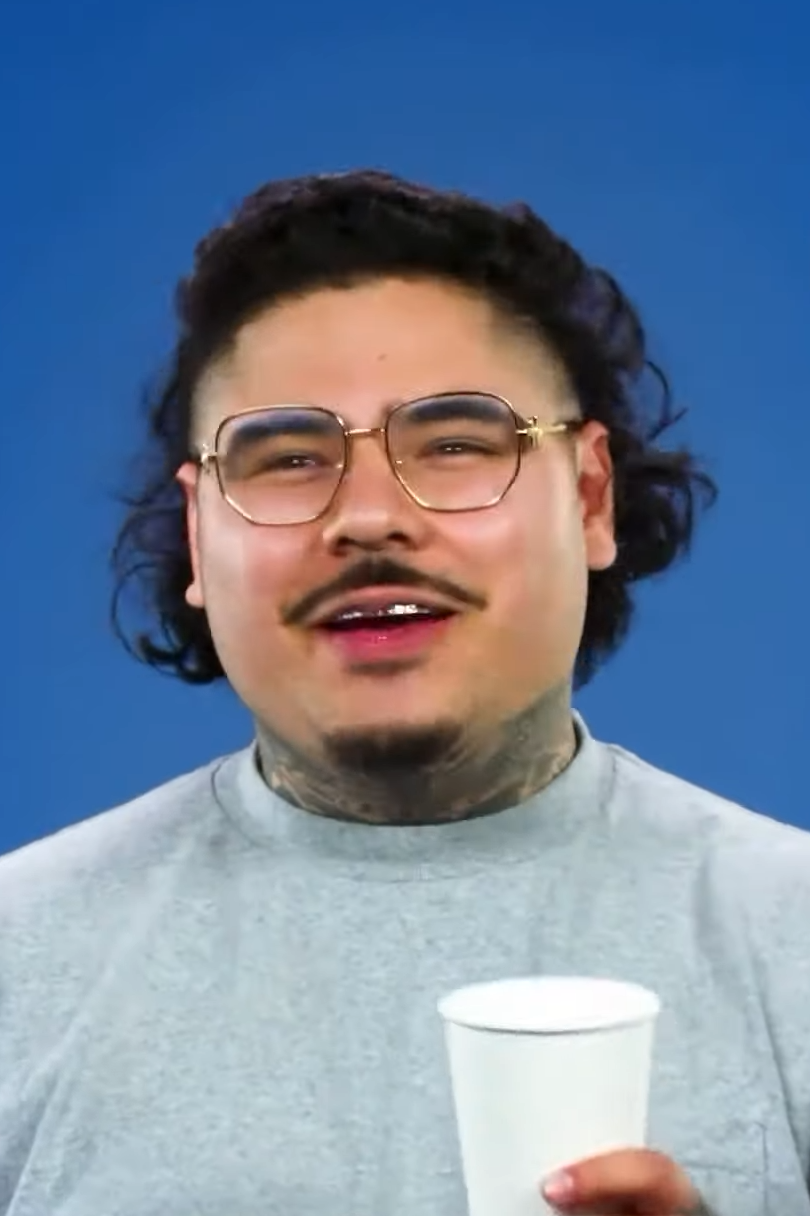
- Gazca in 2024

Background information
- Born: Virgil René Gazca; February 2, 1999 (age 27); Bay City, Texas, U.S.
- Genres: Southern hip hop; Hardcore hip-hop; trap; drill
- Occupation: Rapper
- Instrument: Vocals
- Years active: 2020–present
- Labels: Manifest / GoodTalk; Good Money; Interscope
- Website: thatmexicanot.net

Virgil René Gazca (born February 2, 1999), known professionally as That Mexican OT (with OT standing for Outta Texas), is an American rapper from Bay City, Texas. He is best known for his 2023 single "Johnny Dang" (with Paul Wall and Drodi), which entered the Billboard Hot 100 and led him to sign with Interscope Records. The song preceded the release of his debut studio album, Lonestar Luchador, in July of that year. In October 2026, he released Cucuy, a 17-track album.

That Mexican OT's music takes influence from hip-hop and Chicano rap.

== Early life ==
Virgil René Gazca was born in Bay City, Texas, in 1999. His mother, Sophia Ann Gazca, was killed by a drunk driver in 2007. His father was incarcerated when Gazca was a child and was seldom involved in his life when he was out. Shelby Stewart of the Houston Chronicle stated that Gazca "faced the hardships of life in the ghetto...faced betrayal from his own kin, and he's even had his own battle with drug abuse".

== Career ==
As a performer, Gazca adopted the stage name That Mexican OT, short for "Outta Texas". After graduating from Stony Point High School, Gazca began recording hip-hop songs independently for online release. This led to him releasing a number of mixtapes in the early 2020s, including South Texas Project (2020), Southside Steppin (2021), 1 Double 0 (2021), and Nonsense and Mexican Shit (2022). His independent releases and remixes of other artists' material led to him gaining further exposure.

He released his next album Lonestar Luchador on July 28, 2023 through Good Money Global. The album includes his breakthrough single "Johnny Dang". The song is a reference to the jeweler Johnny Dang, and features guest appearances by Paul Wall and Drodi. Upon release, the song went to number 65 on the Billboard Hot 100, giving both That Mexican OT and Drodi their first chart appearances. In addition, the song's music video has been played over 97 million times on YouTube and the song itself streamed over 194 million times on Spotify. Lonestar Luchador charted at number 59 on the Billboard 200 upon release. Nadine Smith of Pitchfork described the album as "a brightly colored spectacle, a freestyle brawl of rap styles and regional flavors." Collaborators on Lonestar Luchador include Ralph Barbosa, BigXthaPlug, Lefty Sm, Maxo Kream, and Big Yavo.

Following the release of "Johnny Dang", That Mexican OT began a 20-city tour of the United States in October 2023. In January 2024, he released the song "02.02.99", the lead single off of his mixtape Texas Technician, which he released on March 1, 2024 on Manifest/Goodtalk/Good Money Global/Capitol.

== Influences ==
Gazca was influenced by a number of musicians in his youth, ranging from rapper Big L to country singer George Strait. He told Shelby Stewart of the Houston Chronicle that he had wanted to be a rapper since he was four years old, and would sing along to rap videos he saw on 106 & Park. He also thought that his music showed influence of his Texan and Mexican ancestry through the lyrics of songs such as "Hardest Ese Ever". David Crone of AllMusic wrote of That Mexican OT's style that it contains "bold lyricism and a relentless flow while melding trap and mariachi guitars". Billboard similarly stated that Lonestar Luchador contained Tejano music influences as well as hip-hop. Gazca told Billboard that the inspiration for the song "Johnny Dang" was the works of Slick Rick, and that the album's title was inspired by lucha libre, a Mexican style of wrestling.

== Discography ==
=== Albums ===
List of studio albums, with selected details and chart positions
| Title | Album details | Peak chart positions |
| Title | Album details | US |
|---|---|---|
| Lonestar Luchador | Released: July 28, 2023; Label: Manifest, GoodTalk, Good Money, Interscope; Format: CD, LP, digital download, streaming | 59 |
| Texas Technician | Released: March 1, 2024; Label: Manifest, GoodTalk, Good Money, Interscope; Format: CD, LP, digital download, streaming | 64 |
| Chicken & Sauce (with Sauce Walka) | Released: April 18, 2025; Label: Manifest, GoodTalk, Good Money, Interscope; Format: CD, LP, digital download, streaming | – |
| Recess | Released: August 15, 2025; Label: Manifest, GoodTalk, Good Money, Capitol Records; Format: Digital download, streaming | – |

=== Mixtapes ===
List of mixtapes, with selected details
| Title | Mixtape details |
|---|---|
| South Texas Project | Released: June 5, 2020; Label: Self-released; Format: Digital download, streaming |
| Southside Steppin | Released: October 22, 2021; Label: Manifest Music Group; Format: Digital download, streaming |
| 1 Double 0 | Released: December 17, 2021; Label: Manifest Music Group; Format: CD, digital download, streaming |
| Nonsense and Mexican Shit | Released: August 26, 2022; Label: Manifest, GoodTalk, Good Money, Interscope; Format: CD, digital download, streaming |
| The Show Must Go On (with Saxkboy KD) | Released: March 3, 2023; Label: Cash Money Records; Format: CD, digital download, streaming |

=== Singles ===
==== As lead artist ====
| Title | Year | Peak chart positions | | Certifications | Album |
| Title | Year | US | US R&B/HH | Certifications | Album |
|---|---|---|---|---|---|
| "La Muerte" | 2020 | — | — | | Non-album singles |
| "Heart Stopper" | 2020 | — | — | | Non-album singles |
| "Yoppas & Choppas" | 2020 | — | — | | Non-album singles |
| "Peanut Butter Jelly" | 2021 | — | — | | Non-album singles |
| "Call of the Grito" | 2021 | — | — | | Non-album singles |
| "Dirty" | 2021 | — | — | | Non-album singles |
| "Texas Meskin" | 2021 | — | — | | Non-album singles |
| "Sub Zero" | 2021 | — | — | | Non-album singles |
| "Suena" (featuring Lil Mexico) | 2021 | — | — | | Non-album singles |
| "La Cobra" (featuring Drodi) | 2021 | — | — | | Non-album singles |
| "Hardest Ese Ever" | 2021 | — | — | | Non-album singles |
| "Ghetto Boys" | 2022 | — | — | | Non-album singles |
| "Padre" (with Drodi) | 2022 | — | — | | Non-album singles |
| "Child's Play" | 2022 | — | — | | Non-album singles |
| "Sidewalk" (with Drodi) | 2022 | — | — | | Non-album singles |
| "V-Man" | 2022 | — | — | | Non-album singles |
| "Hold on Screw" | 2022 | — | — | | Non-album singles |
| "Kick Doe Click" | 2022 | — | — | | Non-album singles |
| "Ben Over" | 2022 | — | — | | Non-album singles |
| "Slap" (with Drodi) | 2022 | — | — | | Non-album singles |
| "Pretty Rick" | 2022 | — | — | | Non-album singles |
| "NBA" (with Coldblooded Tyrell) | 2022 | — | — | | Non-album singles |
| "Ridin' Dirty" | 2022 | — | — | | Non-album singles |
| "Dro-T" (with Drodi) | 2022 | — | — | | Non-album singles |
| "The Devils Tango" (with C4Play) | 2022 | — | — | | Non-album singles |
| "Chingon" (with Peso Peso) | 2022 | — | — | | Non-album singles |
| "No Es Fácil" (with Toonz) | 2022 | — | — | | Non-album singles |
| "Hear Me" | 2023 | — | — | | Non-album singles |
| "Bow Down" (with Drodi) | 2023 | — | — | | Non-album singles |
| "Just Talking" (with Saxkboy KD) | 2023 | — | — | | Non-album singles |
| "Old Him" | 2023 | — | — | | Non-album singles |
| "Slide" | 2023 | — | — | | Non-album singles |
| "Johnny Dang" (with Paul Wall and Drodi) | 2023 | 65 | 19 | RIAA: Platinum; RMNZ: Gold | Lonestar Luchador |
| "Barrio" (with Lefty Sm) | 2023 | — | — | | Non-album singles |
| "Pretty-Girl" (with Drodi) | 2023 | — | — | | Non-album singles |
| "Covered in Ice" (with Paul Wall) | 2023 | — | — | | Non-album singles |
| "02.02.99" | 2024 | 74 | 30 | RIAA: Gold | Texas Technician |
| "Point Em Out" (with DaBaby) | 2024 | — (Note: "Point Em Out" did not enter the Billboard Hot 100, but peaked at number eight on the Bubbling Under Hot 100 chart.) | 44 | | Texas Technician |
| "AR" (with MO3 featuring BigXthaPlug) | 2024 | — | — | | Non-album singles |
| "All the Time" (with DJ Afterthought and C.L. McCoy) | 2024 | — | — | | Non-album singles |
| "The Ticket" (with Tre Loaded) | 2024 | — | — | | Loaded |
| "1982" (with Currensy and Le$) | 2024 | — | — | | Non-album singles |
| "Selena" (with Peso Peso) | 2024 | — | — | | Non-album singles |
| "War Wounds" (That Mexican OT featuring Maxo Kream and Lil' Keke) | 2024 | — | — | | Non-album singles |
| "Whiskey for the Wine (Remix)" (with Lil Man J) | 2024 | — | — | | Non-album singles |
| "In My Cup" (with Mg Lil Bubba) | 2024 | — | — | | Non-album singles |
| "Pull Up" (with Renizance) | 2024 | — | — | | Non-album singles |
| "Tha Kitchen" (with Cartel Bo) | 2025 | — | — | | Non-album singles |
| "Check Please" (with Lil Jairmy and Mg Lil Bubba) | 2025 | — | — | | Non-album singles |
| "Samsung Screenz" (with Sauce Walka) | 2025 | — | — | | Non-album singles |
| "Show Me the Money" (with Ro$ama) | 2025 | — | — | | Non-album singles |
| "Baby Mad at Me" (with Lil Wayne) | 2025 | — | 37 | | Recess |
| "Need That" | 2026 | — | — | | Non-album singles |
| "The Boogie Man" | | | | | |

==== As featured artist ====
| Title | Year | Peak chart positions | Album |
| Title | Year | NZ Hot | Album |
|---|---|---|---|
| "Bhad Mamacita" (Sonny Z featuring That Mexican OT) | 2022 | — | Non-album singles |
| "Lime Light" (Brown Money Mindz featuring That Mexican OT) | 2022 | — | Non-album singles |
| "24z" (Drodi featuring That Mexican OT, Lil Jairmy and Peso Peso) | 2022 | — | Non-album singles |
| "So Beautiful" (Blanco featuring That Mexican OT, Fingazz and Zig Zag) | 2023 | | Non-album singles |
| "Fully Automatic" (Mac Young featuring That Mexican OT) | 2023 | — | Non-album singles |
| "God's Favorite" (C-Styles featuring That Mexican OT and DaRoach) | 2023 | — | Non-album singles |
| "Rags 2 Riches" (Angel Serna featuring That Mexican OT) | 2023 | — | Non-album singles |
| "Glue" (Drodi featuring That Mexican OT and Peso Peso) | 2023 | — | Non-album singles |
| "Oversteppin'" (Lah Pat featuring That Mexican OT) | 2023 | — | Non-album singles |
| "Fuck It" (Brown Money Mindz featuring DeeBaby and That Mexican OT) | 2024 | — | Non-album singles |
| "Holy Ghost" (Drodi featuring That Mexican OT) | 2024 | — | Non-album singles |
| "Talkin In Screw" (Maxo Kream featuring That Mexican OT) | 2024 | — | Non-album singles |
| "Plug Me In" (E Dollar featuring That Mexican OT and Rossman Different) | 2024 | — | Non-album singles |
| "Black Flag Freestyle" (Denzel Curry featuring That Mexican OT) | 2024 | 40 | King of the Mischievous South, Vol. 2 |
| "Bad Idea" (Flo Rida featuring That Mexican OT) | 2025 | — | Non-album single |
| "Big Dog" (Prof with That Mexican OT & 2 Chainz) | 2026 | — | Bad Time Boy |

==== Other charted songs ====
| Title | Year | Peak chart positions | | Album |
| Title | Year | US Bub. | US R&B/HH | Album |
|---|---|---|---|---|
| "Twisting Fingers" (with Moneybagg Yo) | 2024 | 17 | 40 | Texas Technician |

=== Other charted songs ===
| Title | Year | Certifications | Album |
|---|---|---|---|
| "Hit List" (feat. BigXthaPlug and Big Yavo) | 2023 | RIAA: Gold | Lonestar Luchador |
