= American Music Award for Favorite Country Song =

American music award

American Music Awards for Favorite Country Song
- "Choosin' Texas" by Ella Langley is the most recent recipient.
- Country: United States
- Presented by: American Music Awards
- First award: 1974
- Currently held by: Ella Langley - Choosin' Texas (2026)

Highlights
- Most wins: Kenny Rogers (5)
- Most nominations: Kenny Rogers (6)
- Website: theamas.com

The American Music Award for Favorite Song – Country (formerly known as Favorite Country Single 1974-1995) has been awarded since 1974. The category was retired for over a decade in 1995, before returning in the 2016 ceremony. Years reflect the year in which the awards were presented, for works released in the previous year (until 2003 onward when awards were handed out in November of the same year). The all-time winner for this category is Kenny Rogers with 5 wins, he is also the most nominated artist with 6 nominations.

== Winners and nominees ==
=== 1970s ===
Year	Artist	Song	Ref
1974 (1st)
1974 (1st)	Charlie Rich	"Behind Closed Doors"	
1974 (1st)	Conway Twitty	"You've Never Been This Far Before"	
1974 (1st)	Kris Kristofferson	"Why Me"	
1975 (2nd)
1975 (2nd)	Charlie Rich	"The Most Beautiful Girl"	
1975 (2nd)	Merle Haggard	"If We Make It Through December"	
1975 (2nd)	Charley Pride	"Mississippi Cotton Picking Delta Town"	
1976 (3rd)
1976 (3rd)	Glen Campbell	"Rhinestone Cowboy"	
1976 (3rd)	Freddy Fender	"Before the Next Teardrop Falls"	
1976 (3rd)	Willie Nelson	"Blue Eyes Crying in the Rain"	
1977 (4th)
1977 (4th)	Willie Nelson	"Blue Eyes Crying in the Rain"	
1977 (4th)	Loretta Lynn	"Somebody Somewhere (Don't Know What He's Missin' Tonight)"	
1977 (4th)	C. W. McCall	"Convoy"	
1978 (5th)
1978 (5th)	Kenny Rogers	"Lucille"	
1978 (5th)	Glen Campbell	"Southern Nights"	
1978 (5th)	Loretta Lynn	"She's Got You"	
1979 (6th)
1979 (6th)	Linda Ronstadt	"Blue Bayou"	
1979 (6th)	Dolly Parton	"Here You Come Again"	
1979 (6th)	Johnny Paycheck	"Take This Job and Shove It"	

=== 1980s ===
Year	Artist	Song	Ref
1980 (7th)
1980 (7th)	Barbara Mandrell	"Sleeping Single in a Double Bed"	
1980 (7th)	Waylon Jennings	"Amanda"	
1980 (7th)	Eddie Rabbitt	"Suspicions"	
1981 (8th)
1981 (8th)	Kenny Rogers	"Coward of the County"	
1981 (8th)	Crystal Gayle	"If You Ever Change Your Mind"	
1981 (8th)	Kenny Rogers and Kim Carnes	"Don't Fall in Love with a Dreamer"	
1982 (9th)
1982 (9th)	Anne Murray	"Could I Have This Dance"	
1982 (9th)	Willie Nelson	"On the Road Again"	
1982 (9th)	Alabama	"Feels So Right"	
1982 (9th)	Ronnie Milsap	"(There's) No Gettin' Over Me"	
1983 (10th)
1983 (10th)	Kenny Rogers	"Love Will Turn You Around"	
1983 (10th)	The Oak Ridge Boys	"Bobbie Sue"	
1983 (10th)	Sylvia	"Nobody"	
1984 (11th)
1984 (11th)	Kenny Rogers and Dolly Parton	"Islands in the Stream"	
1984 (11th)	Alabama	"Dixieland Delight"	
1984 (11th)	John Anderson	"Swingin'"	
1984 (11th)	The Oak Ridge Boys	"Love Song"	
1985 (12th)
1985 (12th)	Kenny Rogers and Dolly Parton	"Islands in the Stream"	
1985 (12th)	The Judds	"Mama He's Crazy"	
1985 (12th)	Anne Murray	"A Little Good News"	
1986 (13th)
1986 (13th)	Willie Nelson	"Forgiving You Was Easy"	
1986 (13th)	Alabama	"There's No Way"	
1986 (13th)	Lee Greenwood	"Dixie Road"	
1987 (14th)
1987 (14th)	The Judds	"Grandpa (Tell Me 'Bout the Good Ol' Days)"	
1987 (14th)	Dan Seals	"Everything That Glitters (Is Not Gold)"	
1987 (14th)	Randy Travis	"Diggin' Up Bones"	
1987 (14th)	Steve Wariner	"You Can Dream of Me"	
1988 (15th)
1988 (15th)	Randy Travis	"Forever and Ever, Amen"	
1988 (15th)	George Strait	"Ocean Front Property"	
1988 (15th)	Hank Williams, Jr.	"Born to Boogie"	
1989 (16th)
1989 (16th)	Randy Travis	"I Told You So"	
1989 (16th)	Alabama	"Fallin' Again"	
1989 (16th)	Kathy Mattea	"Eighteen Wheels and a Dozen Roses"	

=== 1990s ===
Year	Artist	Song	Ref
1990 (17th)
1990 (17th)	Randy Travis	"Deeper Than the Holler"	
1990 (17th)	Alabama	"If I Had You"	
1990 (17th)	George Strait	"Baby's Gotten Good at Goodbye"	
1991 (18th)
1991 (18th)	Garth Brooks	"If Tomorrow Never Comes"	
1991 (18th)	The Judds	"Born to Be Blue"	
1991 (18th)	George Strait	"Love Without End, Amen"	
1992 (19th)
1992 (19th)	Garth Brooks	"The Thunder Rolls"	
1992 (19th)	Travis Tritt	"Here's a Quarter (Call Someone Who Cares)"	
1992 (19th)	Trisha Yearwood	"She's in Love with the Boy"	
1993 (20th)
1993 (20th)	Billy Ray Cyrus	"Achy Breaky Heart"	
1993 (20th)	Garth Brooks	"The River"	
1993 (20th)	Vince Gill	"I Still Believe in You"	
1994 (21st)
1994 (21st)	Alan Jackson	"Chattahoochee"	
1994 (21st)	Clint Black and Wynonna Judd	"A Bad Goodbye"	
1994 (21st)	Dolly Parton and Friends	"Romeo"	
1995 (22nd)
1995 (22nd)	Vince Gill	"Whenever You Come Around"	
1995 (22nd)	Tim McGraw	"Indian Outlaw"	
1995 (22nd)	John Michael Montgomery	"I Swear"	

=== 2010s ===
Year	Artist	Song	Ref
2016 (44th)
2016 (44th)	Tim McGraw	"Humble and Kind"	
2016 (44th)	Florida Georgia Line	"H.O.L.Y."	
2016 (44th)	Thomas Rhett	"Die a Happy Man"	
2017 (45th)
2017 (45th)	Keith Urban	"Blue Ain't Your Color"	
2017 (45th)	Sam Hunt	"Body Like a Back Road"	
2017 (45th)	Jon Pardi	"Dirt On My Boots"	
2018 (46th)
2018 (46th)	Kane Brown	"Heaven"	
2018 (46th)	Bebe Rexha featuring Florida Georgia Line	"Meant to Be"	
2018 (46th)	Dan + Shay	"Tequila"	
2019 (47th)
2019 (47th)	Dan + Shay	"Speechless"	
2019 (47th)	Luke Combs	"Beautiful Crazy"	
2019 (47th)	Blake Shelton	"God's Country"	

=== 2020s ===
Year	Artist	Song	Ref
2020 (48th)	Dan + Shay and Justin Bieber	"10,000 Hours"	
2020 (48th)	Maren Morris	"The Bones"	
2020 (48th)	Blake Shelton and Gwen Stefani	"Nobody but You"	
2021 (49th)	Gabby Barrett	"The Good Ones"	
2021 (49th)	Chris Stapleton	"Starting Over"	
2021 (49th)	Chris Young and Kane Brown	"Famous Friends"	
2021 (49th)	Luke Combs	"Forever After All"	
2021 (49th)	Walker Hayes	"Fancy Like"	
2022 (50th)	Morgan Wallen	"Wasted on You"	
2022 (50th)	Jordan Davis (feat. Luke Bryan)	"Buy Dirt"	
2022 (50th)	Cody Johnson	"'Til You Can't"	
2022 (50th)	Dustin Lynch (feat. MacKenzie Porter)	"Thinking 'Bout You"	
2022 (50th)	Chris Stapleton	"You Should Probably Leave"	
2025 (51st)	Post Malone (ft. Morgan Wallen)	"I Had Some Help"	
2025 (51st)	Luke Combs	"Ain't No Love in Oklahoma"	
2025 (51st)	Jelly Roll	"I Am Not Okay"	
2025 (51st)	Koe Wetzel (ft. Jessie Murph)	"High Road"	
2025 (51st)	Shaboozey	"A Bar Song (Tipsy)"	
2026 (52nd)	Ella Langley	"Choosin' Texas"	
2026 (52nd)	BigXthaPlug (ft. Bailey Zimmerman)	"All the Way"	
2026 (52nd)	Morgan Wallen	"Just in Case"	
2026 (52nd)	Russell Dickerson	"Happen to Me"	
2026 (52nd)	Shaboozey	"Good News"	

== Category facts ==
=== Multiple wins ===
5 wins

- Kenny Rogers

3 wins

- Willie Nelson
- Randy Travis

2 wins

- Garth Brooks
- Dolly Parton
- Charlie Rich
- Morgan Wallen

=== Multiple nominations ===
6 nominations

- Kenny Rogers

5 nominations

- Alabama

4 nominations

- Willie Nelson
- Dolly Parton
- Randy Travis

3 nominations

- Garth Brooks
- The Judds
- George Strait
- Morgan Wallen

2 nominations

- Glen Campbell
- Dan + Shay
- Vince Gill
- Loretta Lynn
- Tim McGraw
- Anne Murray
- The Oak Ridge Boys
- Charlie Rich
- Shaboozey
