= Last of My Kind (song) =

Song by Shaboozey featuring Paul Cauthen

from the album Where I've Been, Isn't Where I'm Going
- Released: May 31, 2024
- Length: 3:21
- Label: American Dogwood; Empire
- Songwriters: Collins Chibueze; Paul Cauthen; Sean Cook; McKay Stevens
- Producers: McKay Stevens; Nevin Sastry; Sean Cook

“Last of My Kind” is a song by American musician Shaboozey featuring American country singer Paul Cauthen. The song appears on Shaboozey’s third studio album, Where I’ve Been, Isn’t Where I’m Going, which was released on May 31, 2024. The song was also used in the trailer of The Long Walk.

== Background and composition ==
19 second audio sample of the song's stomp-clap sound

“Last of My Kind” explores themes of survivalism and readiness for the future. The chorus features distorted vocals, contributing to the song’s sense of determination. The song also incorporates a stomp-clap sound suited to a stadium setting.

Shaboozey has described himself as having long felt like an outlier, including feeling like a “black sheep” while growing up. He said that these experiences gave him familiarity with not feeling accepted and expressed his belief that music can transcend divisions between people.

== Critical reception ==
In a review for Yahoo Entertainment, the album was praised for its blend of outlaw country and rock influences, with particular attention given to Paul Cauthen’s vocal performance on “Last of My Kind”.

== Personnel ==
- Shaboozey - vocals
- Paul Cauthen - vocals

=== Songwriters ===
- Shaboozey (Collins Obinna Chibueze)
- Paul Cauthen
- Sean Cook
- McKay Stevens
- Dave Cohen

=== Producers ===
- Sean Cook
- McKay Stevens
- Nevin Cohen

== Charts ==
Chart performance for "Last of My Kind"
Chart (2024)	Peak position
US Hot Country Songs (Billboard)	42

== Certifications ==
Certifications for "Last of My Kind"
Region	Certification	Certified units/sales
United States (RIAA)	Platinum	1,000,000^{‡}
^{‡} Sales+streaming figures based on certification alone.
