= Gabriel Jacoby =

American R&B singer

- Born: 1998 (age 27–28); Anderson, South Carolina, U.S.
- Origin: Tampa, Florida, U.S.
- Genres: R&B; soul; funk; dirty south hip hop
- Occupations: Singer; songwriter; record producer; multi-instrumentalist
- Instruments: Vocals; guitar; piano; bass; drums
- Years active: 2022–present
- Labels: Bourne; Pulse
- Website: gabrieljacoby.com

Gabriel Jacoby (born 1998) is an American R&B singer, songwriter, and record producer based in Los Angeles. He released his debut EP Gutta Child through Bourne Records / Pulse Records in November 2025 and also co-wrote Shaboozey's "Chrome (Bonus)". He supported Khamari on the To Dry a Tear tour in late 2025 and completed his own U.S. headlining tour in early 2026.

== Early life ==
Jacoby was born in 1998 in Anderson, South Carolina and is the eldest of seven siblings. His family moved to Tampa, Florida when he was nine and was raised in neighborhoods around Fletcher Avenue, Temple Terrace, and the Del Rio area of Hillsborough County. Jacoby taught himself to play piano as a child, later adding drums, bass, and guitar. He cites Bob Marley, Nina Simone, Outkast, Lil Wayne, Prince, and James Brown among his influences.

== Career ==
Jacoby began releasing music in 2022 with the single "As You Stand Next to Me", followed by "Reptile" in 2023. He continued issuing singles through 2024, including "Hillside", "Forever", and "Brother and Sister" via Bourne Records / Pulse Records. In 2025, he co-wrote Shaboozey's "Chrome (Bonus)" from the complete edition of Where I've Been, Isn't Where I'm Going.

Jacoby released the single "The One" in September 2025, which Billboard described as a "funky ode to an undeniable love". His debut EP, Gutta Child, was released on November 14, 2025, through Bourne and Pulse Records. The eight-track project was produced by Jacoby and incorporates blues, funk, R&B, and dirty south hip hop. The EP includes the track "bootleg", featuring Tampa rapper Tom G.

Pitchfork scored the EP 7.3 out of 10, with reviewer Stephen Kearse writing that Jacoby "yokes together backwoods blues, bayou funk, and earthy R&B with Dungeon Family bombast". NPR named Gutta Child among its picks for new albums released on November 14, 2025. Billboard called the title track "an instant contender for one of the year's grooviest R&B songs".

Jacoby supported R&B singer Khamari on the To Dry a Tear tour in late 2025. He completed a U.S. headlining tour in early 2026.

== Discography ==
=== Extended plays ===
List of extended plays, with selected details
Title	EP details
Gutta Child	Released: November 14, 2025; Label: Bourne / Pulse; Format: Digital download, streaming

=== Singles ===
List of singles
Title	Year	Album
"As You Stand Next to Me"	2022	Non-album singles
"Reptile"	2023	Non-album singles
"Hillside"	2024	Non-album singles
"Forever"	2024	Non-album singles
"Brother and Sister"	2024	Non-album singles
"Need Your Love"	2025	Non-album singles
"Be Careful"	2025	Gutta Child
"The One"	2025	Gutta Child
"Baby"	2025	Gutta Child

=== Songwriting credits ===
List of songwriting credits
Year	Title	Artist	Album
2025	"Chrome (Bonus)"	Shaboozey	Where I've Been, Isn't Where I'm Going: The Complete Edition
