= Where I've Been, Isn't Where I'm Going =

- Standard edition cover. Complete Edition features a similar cover but with Shaboozey in a white shirt

Studio album by Shaboozey
- Released: May 31, 2024
- Genres: Country; hip-hop; Americana
- Length: 37:52
- Labels: American Dogwood; Empire
- Producers: John Mark Nelson; Mason Sacks; Dave Cohen; McKay Stevens; Nevin Sastry

Shaboozey chronology
Cowboys Live Forever, Outlaws Never Die (2022)	Where I've Been, Isn't Where I'm Going (2024)	The Outlaw Cherie Lee & Other Western Tales (2026)

Singles from Where I've Been, Isn't Where I'm Going
- 1. "Let It Burn" Released: October 6, 2023; 2. "Anabelle" Released: January 26, 2024; 3. "Vegas" Released: March 15, 2024; 4. "A Bar Song (Tipsy)" Released: April 12, 2024; 5. "Highway" Released: October 28, 2024

Singles from Where I've Been, Isn't Where I'm Going: The Complete Edition
- 1. "Good News" Released: November 15, 2024; 2. "Blink Twice" Released: April 11, 2025; 3. "Amen" Released: October 14, 2025

Where I've Been, Isn't Where I'm Going is the third studio album by American musician Shaboozey, released on May 31, 2024, through American Dogwood and Empire Distribution.

It was preceded by five singles, including the US number-one hit "A Bar Song (Tipsy)"; while not being released as a single, the BigXthaPlug collaboration "Drink Don't Need No Mix" reached the top 10 of the Rhythmic Airplay charts. The album also includes collaborations with Paul Cauthen and Noah Cyrus. The album debuted at number five on the US Billboard 200. The deluxe edition, titled Where I've Been, Isn't Where I'm Going: The Complete Edition, was released on April 25, 2025.

== Critical reception ==
Professional ratings
Review scores
Source	Rating
AllMusic	4/5 stars
Holler	9/10
Pitchfork	7.7/10

Grayson Haver Currin of Pitchfork wrote that the album "does not feel like a mere receptacle for one of the year's most unlikely hits", calling it "remarkably assured" and "a sophisticated self-help journey that only occasionally masquerades as a good time. He has spent a long while trying to find some space where the sounds of hip-hop and country could overlap, where the defiant swagger, nostalgic circumspection, and quivering heartbreak of both genres could fuse together". David Browne of Rolling Stone felt that Shaboozey "comes across like someone raised on country who also appreciates hip hop. In doing so, he's effectively changed the game", describing it as "a full-on barrage of post-genre possibilities".

Billboard's Kyle Denis commented that "at a tight 12 tracks, there's no real filler on Where I've Been, Isn't Where I'm Going. Shaboozey assembled his strongest hooks and smartest arrangements to craft a record that embraces both country music tradition and modernity". A staff review from Taste of Country opined that the album "deals with subjects such as heartbreak, depression and even suicide. While the project does feature some more light-hearted tracks, Shaboozey chooses to let us all in on his journey of authenticity and humility". Holler's Soda Canter said that "Shaboozey oozes with ignitable star power as he expertly mixes his hip hop, country and Americana musical influences along with his past experience as a filmmaker", calling it a "creatively diverse cocktail".

== Chart performance ==
Where I've Been, Isn't Where I'm Going debuted at number five on the US Billboard 200 and at number two on the US Top Country Albums chart week dated June 15, 2024, earning 50,000 album-equivalent units. The album was certified Platinum by the RIAA July 3, 2025.

== Track listing ==
Where I've Been, Isn't Where I'm Going track listing
No.	Title	Writer(s)	Producer(s)	Length
1.	"Horses & Hellcats"	Collins Chibueze; Dave Cohen; Gowa Gibbs; Sean Cook; Nevin Sastry	Cohen; Sastry; Cook	2:37
2.	"A Bar Song (Tipsy)"	Chibueze; Cook; Jerrell Jones; Joe Kent; Sastry; Mark Williams	Sastry; Cook	2:51
3.	"Last of My Kind" (featuring Paul Cauthen)	Chibueze; Paul Cauthen; Cook; McKay Stevens	Stevens; Sastry; Cook	3:21
4.	"Anabelle"	Chibueze; Cook; Mason Sacks; Sastry	Sacks; Sastry; Cook	3:06
5.	"East of the Massanutten"	Chibueze; Cook; John Mark Nelson; Sastry; Stevens	Nelson; Stevens; Cook	3:57
6.	"Highway"	Chibueze; Cook; Stevens	Stevens; Cook	2:42
7.	"Let It Burn"	Chibueze; Cook; Sastry; Diederik van Elsas; Parrish Warrington	Sastry; Cook	3:26
8.	"My Fault" (featuring Noah Cyrus)	Chibueze; Bailey Bryan; Cook; Noah Cyrus; PJ Harding; Sastry; Doug Walters	Sastry; Cook	3:56
9.	"Vegas"	Chibueze; Sastry	Sastry	3:01
10.	"Drink Don't Need No Mix" (with BigXthaPlug)	Chibueze; Cook; Xavier Landum; Sastry; Stevens	Stevens; Sastry; Cook	2:13
11.	"Steal Her from Me"	Chibueze; Ben Burgess; Cohen; Cook; Sastry	Cohen; Sastry; Cook	3:33
12.	"Finally Over"	Chibueze; Cook; Tony Esterly; Sastry	Sastry; Cook	3:09
Total length:				37:52

Where I've Been, Isn't Where I'm Going: The Complete Edition deluxe edition track listing
No.	Title	Writer(s)	Producer(s)	Length
13.	"Amen" (with Jelly Roll)	Chibueze; Sastry; Cook; Jackson Foote; Jason DeFord; Jordan Gray; Kevin Powers; Seth Ennis	Danny Majic; Sastry; Cook	3:17
14.	"Hail Mary" (with Sierra Ferrell)	Chibueze; Amy Allen; Sierra Ferrell	Julian Bunetta; Sastry; Cook	2:44
15.	"Fire and Gasoline"	Brett Hite; Spencer Jordan; Zach Seabaugh	Clark; Sastry; Cook	3:12
16.	"Blink Twice" (with Myles Smith)	Chibueze; Myles Smith; Sam Westhoff; Barrett Conner	Haffway; Sastry; Cook	2:36
17.	"Good News"	Chibueze; Cook; Sastry; Jake Torrey; Michael Pollack; Sam Roman	Sastry; Cook	3:19
18.	"Chrome" (bonus)	Chibueze; Christopher Mardini; Gabriel Jacoby	Powers Pleasant; Sastry; Cook	2:25

== Personnel ==
Credits adapted from Tidal.

=== Musicians ===
- Shaboozey – vocals
- Nevin Sastry – guitar (tracks 1–12), vocals (1–5, 7–13), keyboards (1, 2, 4, 5, 7–9, 11–15), banjo (1, 2, 4, 5, 7–9, 11, 12), bass (1, 7, 9, 15), mandolin (2, 4, 12), slide guitar (3), acoustic guitar (13–15, 17), electric guitar (13, 14, 17), drums (15)
- John Mark Nelson – guitar (2, 3, 5–9, 12, 17)
- Lily Honigberg – fiddle (2, 12, 17)
- Sean Cook – acoustic guitar (2, 13–15, 17), electric guitar (2, 13, 14, 17), keyboards (13–15), vocals (13); bass, drums (15)
- Paul Cauthen – vocals (3)
- Danny Majic – banjo, drums, guitar, mandolin, pedal steel guitar (13)
- Aaron Encinas – arrangement, vocals (13)
- Clayton Penrose-Whitemore – fiddle (13)
- Abigail Osborn – vocals (13)
- Allison Iraheta – vocals (13)
- Naarai Jacobs – vocals (13)
- Smith Curry – pedal steel guitar (14, 17), banjo (14)
- Julian Bunetta – drums (14)
- Tyler Cain – electric guitar, harmonica (17)
- Jake Torrey – acoustic guitar (17)
- Norelle – vocals (17)

=== Technical ===
- Colin Leonard – mastering (1–3, 5, 6, 8–12, 17)
- Dave Huffman – mastering (4)
- Chris Athens – mastering (7)
- Dale Becker – mastering (13–16, 18)
- Raul Lopez – mixing (1–8, 10–12)
- Ryan Dulude – mixing (9)
- Manny Marroquin – mixing (13–17)
- Skyler Gibbons – engineering
- Stef Moro – engineering (4)
- Jim Cooley – engineering (13)
- Joe Fox – engineering (13)
- Claude Vause – engineering (16)
- Peter Fenn – engineering (16)
- Sean Cook – recording (1–3, 5–8, 10–12, 15, 17, 18)
- Nevin Sastry – recording (4, 9)
- Trey Pearce – recording (8)
- Edoardo Ghigo – recording (13)
- Julian Bunetta – recording (14)
- Adam Amoedo – recording (18)
- Katie Harvey – mastering assistance (13–16, 18)

== Charts ==
=== Weekly charts ===
Weekly chart performance for Where I've Been, Isn't Where I'm Going
Chart (2024–2025)	Peak position
Australian Albums (ARIA)	51
Australian Country Albums (ARIA)	4
Canadian Albums (Billboard)	3
Finnish Albums (Suomen virallinen lista)	34
New Zealand Albums (RMNZ)	18
Norwegian Albums (VG-lista)	10
Scottish Albums (Official Charts)	77
UK Albums (Official Charts)	93
UK Country Albums (Official Charts)	1
UK Independent Albums (Official Charts)	7
US Billboard 200	5
US Americana/Folk Albums (Billboard)	1
US Independent Albums (Billboard)	1
US Top Country Albums (Billboard)	2

=== Year-end charts ===
2024 year-end chart performance for Where I've Been, Isn't Where I'm Going
Chart (2024)	Position
Australian Country Albums (ARIA)	28
Canadian Albums (Billboard)	39
US Billboard 200	85
US Top Country Albums (Billboard)	20

2025 year-end chart performance for Where I've Been, Isn't Where I'm Going
Chart (2025)	Position
Canadian Albums (Billboard)	18
New Zealand Albums (RMNZ)	40
US Billboard 200	22
US Top Country Albums (Billboard)	6

== Certifications ==
Certifications for Where I've Been, Isn't Where I'm Going
Region	Certification	Certified units/sales
New Zealand (RMNZ)	2× Platinum	30,000^{‡}
United Kingdom (BPI)	Gold	100,000^{‡}
United States (RIAA)	Platinum	1,000,000^{‡}
^{‡} Sales+streaming figures based on certification alone.

== Accolades ==
Year-end lists
Publication	Rank	List
Rolling Stone	24	The 30 Best Country Albums of 2024
Taste of Country	2	The 10 Best Country Albums of 2024
