= Cowgirl (Shaboozey song) =

2026 single by Shaboozey

Single by Shaboozey

from the album The Outlaw Cherie Lee & Other Western Tales
- Released: June 5, 2026
- Length: 2:56
- Label: American Dogwood; Empire
- Songwriters: Collins Chibueze; Sean Cook; Nevin Sastry; Abas Pauti; Whit Kane; McKay Stevens; Jared Cotter
- Producers: Sean Cook; Nevin Sastry

Shaboozey singles chronology
"Born to Die" (2026)	"Cowgirl" (2026)	"Burn It Down" (2026)

Music video
- "Cowgirl" on YouTube

"Cowgirl" is a song by American musician Shaboozey, released on June 5, 2026, as the second single from his fourth studio album The Outlaw Cherie Lee & Other Western Tales (2026) with an accompanying music video. He wrote the song with its producers Sean Cook and Nevin, Abas Pauti, Whit Kane, McKay Stevens and Jared Cotter.

== Music video ==
The music video was directed by Logan Meis and Shaboozey, with story/writing credits to Shaboozey and Xaivia Inniss. It stars Ciara Miller as Cherie Lee, a Wild West gunslinger who seeks to avenge the murder of her father, the town sheriff. Five days after his death, she shrieks furiously at his cross-marked grave, while clad in black. She strolls into a saloon, where she gains the admiration and respect of the other patrons by outperforming the cowboys in various challenges, such as drinking, arm-wrestling, and shooting a glass of liquor off a man's head without harming him.

== Charts ==
Chart performance for "Cowgirl"
Chart (2026)	Peak position
Canada Hot 100 (Billboard)	21
Canada AC (Billboard)	27
Canada CHR/Top 40 (Billboard)	36
Canada Country (Billboard)	9
Canada Hot AC (Billboard)	33
New Zealand Hot Singles (RMNZ)	12
Nigeria (TurnTable Top 100)	100
Nigeria Airplay (TurnTable)	59
Slovakia Airplay (ČNS IFPI)	29
UK Singles Sales (OCC)	52
US Billboard Hot 100	42
US Country Airplay (Billboard)	19
US Hot Country Songs (Billboard)	11

== Release history ==
Release dates and formats for "Cowgirl"
Region	Date	Format	Label(s)	Ref.
United States	June 29, 2026	Country radio	American Dogwood; Empire	
