= Took a Walk (song) =

2025 song by Shaboozey and Stephen Wilson Jr.

Single by Shaboozey and Stephen Wilson Jr.
- Released: September 5, 2025
- Genre: Country ballad
- Length: 4:00
- Label: American Dogwood / Empire
- Songwriters: Stephen Wilson Jr.; Stephen Musselman; Connor Sullivan; Sean Cook; Nevin Sastry
- Producers: Connor Sullivan; Stephen Musselman; Sean Cook; Nevin Sastry

Audio sample
- A 22-second sample illustrating the song's guitar-led country-ballad composition.: file; help

"Took a Walk" is a song by American musicians Shaboozey and Stephen Wilson Jr. The song was released on August 29, 2025. The song was used for the end credits of The Long Walk.

== Background ==
Shaboozey became involved with The Long Walk after his song "Last of My Kind" was used in a trailer for the film. Interested in contributing further, he asked his team about additional opportunities and learned that the film needed a song for its end credits. After watching a preview of the film, Shaboozey began writing "Took a Walk" that same day. After writing the song, Shaboozey invited Stephen Wilson Jr. to collaborate with him. Shaboozey felt that Wilson's voice and musical style suited the song and the themes of The Long Walk. Wilson subsequently recorded his part for "Took a Walk". Shaboozey initially considered recording a cover of Johnny Cash's "I Walk the Line" for the film, but said the studio felt the choice was too obvious. He subsequently developed an original song for the film.

After watching the film, Shaboozey said he was moved by its characters and their continued hope for a better life and world despite their uncertain futures. He wanted the song to complement the film's themes while maintaining a sense of hope.

Shaboozey, a fan of Stephen King, became interested in contributing additional music to The Long Walk after his song "Last of My Kind" was used in the film's trailer. After learning that a song was needed for the film's end credits, he watched a preview of the film and wrote "Took a Walk" the same day. He later contacted Stephen Wilson Jr. to collaborate on the song.

== Composition ==
"Took a Walk" was written by Shaboozey, Stephen Wilson Jr., Connor Sullivan and Stephen Musselman. The song was produced by Sean Cook, Stephen Musselman and Connor Sullivan.

The song is a country ballad whose lyrics center on the journey through life, friendship and perseverance. The song reflects themes from The Long Walk while presenting a more hopeful perspective than the film. Stephen Wilson Jr. contributed guitar to the song. Shaboozey said he chose Wilson because he felt his guitar would complement the film's timeless and soulful atmosphere.

== Reception ==
Uproxx writer Aaron Williams described "Took a Walk" as a "moody country ballad", noting its themes of brotherhood and acknowledging the difficulties of life. Williams also observed that the song has a more uplifting tone than the film.

== Live performances ==
Shaboozey and Stephen Wilson Jr. performed "Took a Walk" together at the 59th Annual Country Music Association Awards on November 19, 2025. Wilson joined Shaboozey onstage to perform "Took a Walk" during Shaboozey's concert at The Pinnacle in Nashville in September 2025. Wilson also performed his rendition of "Stand by Me" during the ceremony. He noted that both of his performances that night had connections to Stephen King adaptations: "Took a Walk" was written for The Long Walk, while "Stand by Me" was featured in the film adaptation of King's novella The Body.

== Release ==
"Took a Walk" was released as an original song from The Long Walk. The single was released through American Dogwood and Empire.
