= Good News (Shaboozey song) =

2024 single by Shaboozey

Single by Shaboozey

from the album Where I've Been, Isn't Where I'm Going: The Complete Edition
- Released: November 15, 2024
- Genre: Country
- Length: 3:19
- Label: American Dogwood; Empire
- Songwriters: Collins Chibueze; Sean Cook; Nevin Sastry; Jacob Torrey; Michael Pollack; Samuel Roman
- Producers: Sean Cook; Nevin

Shaboozey singles chronology
"A Bar Song (Tipsy)" (2024)	"Good News" (2024)	"Blink Twice" (2025)

Music video
- "Good News" on YouTube

"Good News" is a song by American musician Shaboozey, released on November 15, 2024, as the lead single from the complete edition of his third studio album, Where I've Been, Isn't Where I'm Going (2025). It was produced by Sean Cook and Nevin Sastry. Peaking at number 12 on the Billboard Hot 100, the track secured two Grammy Award nominations and an IHeartRadio Music Award win for Country Song Of The Year. Outside the United States, the track also saw global success, topping charts in Slovakia, Canada, Australia, and peaking in the top ten in New Zealand and Sweden.

== Background ==
Shaboozey first shared a clip of the song on November 1, 2024. He teased the song again on November 5, posting another snippet of the song on the video-sharing app TikTok.

== Composition and lyrics ==
"Good News" is a country song with an instrumental comprising acoustic guitar, pedal steel guitar and fiddle. The lyrics are about looking for the silver lining amid his sorrow. The song begins with the line "Man, what a hell of a year it's been", which is possibly also a reference to Shaboozey's career success in 2024. In the opening verse, Shaboozey details struggling with his mental health and unsuccessfully attempting to cope with his troubles by drinking alcohol, describing himself as "the man at the bar confessing his sins". He additionally highlights these problems in the chorus: "I need some good news / Sittin' here, sippin' on cold truth / Nobody knows what I'm goin' through / Bet the devil wouldn't walk in my shoes / Wish someone told me / 'Livin' this life would be lonely' / Tryna get away from the old me / Still stuck singin' these blues / All I really need is a little good news". In the second verse, Shaboozey conveys he has not been receiving love that comes his way and is sowing the seeds of negative feelings.

== Charts ==
=== Weekly charts ===
Weekly chart performance for "Good News"
Chart (2024–2026)	Peak position
Australia (ARIA)	63
Australia Country Hot 50 (The Music)	1
Canada Hot 100 (Billboard)	13
Canada CHR/Top 40 (Billboard)	7
Canada Country (Billboard)	1
CIS Airplay (TopHit)	96
Czech Republic Singles Digital (ČNS IFPI)	57
Denmark Airplay (Tracklisten)	16
Global 200 (Billboard)	156
Lithuania Airplay (TopHit)	91
New Zealand Hot Singles (RMNZ)	8
Slovakia Airplay (ČNS IFPI)	1
Sweden Heatseeker (Sverigetopplistan)	4
UK Singles Sales (OCC)	65
US Billboard Hot 100	12
US Adult Contemporary (Billboard)	11
US Adult Pop Airplay (Billboard)	5
US Country Airplay (Billboard)	1
US Hot Country Songs (Billboard)	3
US Pop Airplay (Billboard)	6

=== Year-end charts ===
Year-end chart performance for "Good News"
Chart (2025)	Position
Australia (ARIA)	72
Canada (Canadian Hot 100)	16
Iceland (Tónlistinn)	92
US Billboard Hot 100	23
US Adult Pop Airplay (Billboard)	17
US Country Airplay (Billboard)	4
US Hot Country Songs (Billboard)	6
US Pop Airplay (Billboard)	33

== Certifications ==
Certifications and sales for "Good News"
Region	Certification	Certified units/sales
New Zealand (RMNZ)	Platinum	30,000^{‡}
United Kingdom (BPI)	Silver	200,000^{‡}
United States (RIAA)	2× Platinum	2,000,000^{‡}
^{‡} Sales+streaming figures based on certification alone.
