= The Outlaw Cherie Lee & Other Western Tales =

Studio album by Shaboozey
- Released: July 31, 2026
- Genres: Country; hip-hop; Americana
- Length: 46:00
- Labels: American Dogwood; Empire
- Producers: Sean Cook; Noah Ehler; Mike Hector; Tyler Johnson; Stephen Musselman; Julian Nixon; Wesley Orr; ReezyTunez; Mason Sacks; Nevin Sastry; Shaboozey; Connor Sullivan

Shaboozey chronology
Where I've Been, Isn't Where I'm Going (2024)	The Outlaw Cherie Lee & Other Western Tales (2026)

Singles from The Outlaw Cherie Lee & Other Western Tales
- 1. "Born to Die" Released: April 24, 2026; 2. "Cowgirl" Released: June 10, 2026; 3. "Burn It Down" Released: July 24, 2026

The Outlaw Cherie Lee & Other Western Tales is the fourth studio album by the American musician Shaboozey, released on July 31, 2026, through American Dogwood and Empire Distribution.

The album features guest appearances by Jamie Foxx, Gunna, Leon Bridges, Teyana Taylor, Kehlani, Sam Elliott, and Orville Peck. Shaboozey described the album as a concept album co-created with Xaivia Inniss, following a story arc about a fictional outlaw named Cherie Lee who is out for revenge.

The album received mostly positive reviews from critics.

== Track listing ==
The Outlaw Cherie Lee & Other Western Tales track listing
No.	Title	Writer(s)	Producer(s)	Length
1.	"The Outlaw Cherie Lee" (with Jamie Foxx)	Collins Chibueze; Stephen Musselman; Connor Sullivan	Shaboozey; Sean Cook; Musselman; Nevin Sastry; Sullivan	0:44
2.	"Til Sunday"	Chibueze; Cook; Wesley Orr; Mason Sacks; Sastry; McKay Stevens	Shaboozey; Cook; Sacks; Sastry	2:12
3.	"High Noon" (featuring Gunna)	Chibueze; Tyler Johnson; Sergio Kitchens; Chadron Moore; Jasiel Robinson; Sastry	Shaboozey; Cook; Mike Hector; Johnson; Julian Nixon; Sastry	2:31
4.	"Hell Is Hot" (with Jamie Foxx)	Chibueze; Musselman; Sullivan	Shaboozey; Cook; Musselman; Sastry; Sullivan	0:52
5.	"Sweet Revenge"	Chibueze; Musselman; Pdubcookin; Stevens; Sullivan	Shaboozey; Cook; Musselman; Sastry; Sullivan	3:54
6.	"If I Was an Outlaw"	Chibueze; Sastry	Shaboozey; Cook; Sastry	2:34
7.	"Cowgirl"	Chibueze; Cook; Jared Cotter; Hoskins; Whit Kane; Jackson Morgan; Abas Pauti; Sastry; Stevens	Shaboozey; Cook; Sastry	2:56
8.	"Burn It Down" (featuring Leon Bridges)	Chibueze; Todd Bridges; Musselman; Sullivan	Shaboozey; Cook; Musselman; Sastry; Sullivan	4:11
9.	"Death of Jeremiah Walker" (with Teyana Taylor)	Chibueze; Xaivia Inniss; Musselman; Sullivan	Shaboozey; Cook; Musselman; Sastry; Sullivan	0:59
10.	"Drunk"	Chibueze; Musselman; Pdubcookin; Sullivan	Shaboozey; Cook; Musselman; Sastry; Sullivan	2:43
11.	"Ugly & All"	Musselman; Pdubcookin; Sullivan	Shaboozey; Cook; Musselman; Sastry; Sullivan	0:49
12.	"Bullets & Blades" (featuring Kehlani)	Chibueze; Kane; Orr; Kehlani Parrish; Stevens; Jared Thorne	Shaboozey; Cook; Noah Ehler; Musselman; Orr; ReezyTunez; Sastry; Sullivan	3:16
13.	"Don't Count Down" (with Sam Elliott)	Chibueze; Inniss	Shaboozey; Cook; Sastry	0:41
14.	"Lone Survivor"	Chibueze; Cook; Sastry; SephGotTheWaves; Stevens	Shaboozey; Cook; Sastry	2:29
15.	"Bounty on My Head"	Chibueze; Cook; Musselman; Sastry; Sullivan	Shaboozey; Cook; Musselman; Sastry; Sullivan	3:51
16.	"Born to Die"	Chibueze; Jackson Foote; Kane; Josh Murty; Sastry; Stevens; Laura Veltz	Shaboozey; Cook; Sastry	2:41
17.	"Kissed by an Angel"	Chibueze; Cook; Musselman; Sastry; Sullivan	Shaboozey; Cook; Musselman; Sastry; Sullivan	3:01
18.	"The Worst of Them All (Interlude)"	Musselman; Sullivan	Shaboozey; Cook; Musselman; Sastry; Sullivan	1:14
19.	"Coyote's Point"	Chibueze; Orr	Shaboozey; Cook; Musselman; Sastry; Sullivan	2:51
20.	"The Epilogue" (featuring Orville Peck)		Shaboozey; Cook; Ehler; Sastry	1:44
Total length:				46:00

=== Note ===
- On physical releases, "Bullets & Blades" is stylized "Bullets + Blades".

== Personnel ==
Credits are adapted from Tidal.

=== Musicians ===
- Shaboozey – performance
- Connor Sullivan – acoustic guitar (tracks 1, 5–10, 12, 17, 18), guest vocals (2, 6–8, 16), bass (8, 12), electric guitar (8), mandolin (10), background vocals (15), Dobro guitar (16, 19, 20), piano (18)
- Drew Taubenfeld – harmonica (1, 2, 5, 17, 18)
- Nevin Sastry – drum programming (2, 3, 7, 16), percussion (2, 5–8, 10, 12, 14–17, 19), guest vocals (2, 5–8, 14, 16), background vocals (2, 5, 6, 8, 12, 14–17, 19), bass (2, 15, 17), keyboards (3, 7, 8, 10, 12, 14–17), acoustic guitar (3, 7, 8, 16, 17), electric guitar (5, 7, 12, 15, 16), drums (14), harmonica (17)
- Stephen Musselman – guest vocals (2, 5–8, 16), pedal steel guitar (2, 6–8, 10, 12, 16, 19), Dobro guitar (2, 7, 8), banjo (2), acoustic guitar (4, 7–10), electric guitar (5, 7, 8, 18), mandolin (10, 19, 20), bass (12), background vocals (15), baritone guitar (18)
- Sean Cook – drum programming (2, 3, 7, 16), percussion (2, 5–8, 10, 12, 14–17, 19), guest vocals (2, 5–8, 14, 16), bass (2, 5, 7, 8, 14–16), keyboards (3, 7, 8, 10, 12, 14–17), acoustic guitar (5, 7, 8, 15–17), drums (5, 6, 14), electric guitar (12, 16)
- Pdubcookin – fiddle (2, 5–8, 10, 12, 14–16), strings (10, 11, 15)
- Abas Pauti – guest vocals (2, 6–8, 16)
- Mason Sacks – Dobro guitar (2)
- Noah Ehler – harmonica (3, 19), acoustic guitar (3, 20), percussion (6, 19); electric guitar, piano (6); cello, keyboards, strings (12); drums, flute, snare drum (20)
- Tyler Johnson – background vocals (3)
- Julian Nixon – bass, drum programming (3)
- Mike Hector – drum programming (3)
- Bailey Bryan – background vocals (5–8, 10, 12, 16, 17), guest vocals (5)
- Jeremy Long – organ (5), piano (6)
- Norelle – background vocals (5)
- Daniel Rhine – double bass (6, 10, 12, 17, 19)
- Ryan Cook – drums (7, 8, 12, 15), guest vocals (7, 16)
- Diner – background vocals (7, 16)
- John Mark Nelson – background vocals (10), acoustic guitar (19)
- Noeline Hofmann – background vocals (10)
- McKay Stevens – guest vocals (14)
- Wesley Orr – background vocals (19)

=== Technical ===
- Sean Cook – engineering (1–10, 12, 14–17, 19, 20)
- Sam Pounds – engineering (1, 4)
- Florian "Flo" Ongonga – engineering (3)
- Owen Stoutt – engineering (3)
- Connor Sullivan – engineering (5, 8, 10–12, 18, 19)
- Carrington Brown – engineering (9)
- Matty McKay – engineering (10)
- Jenna Felsenthal – engineering (12)
- Michael Miller – engineering (13)
- Jermaine Carter – engineering assistance (1, 4)
- Zachary Acosta – mixing (1, 4, 9, 11, 13, 18), mixing assistance (2, 3, 8, 10, 12, 14, 15, 19)
- Neal Pogue – mixing (2, 3, 8, 10, 12, 14, 15, 17, 19)
- Jim Cooley – mixing (5, 6, 20)
- Serban Ghenea – mixing (7, 16)
- Jon Blass – immersive mixing
- Colin Leonard – mastering (1–15, 17–20)
- Dale Becker – mastering (16)

== Charts ==
Chart performance for The Outlaw Cherie Lee & Other Western Tales
Chart (2026)	Peak position
Australian Albums (ARIA)	52
Australian Country Albums (ARIA)	9
Canadian Albums (Billboard)	39
Scottish Albums (Official Charts)	73
UK Albums Sales (Official Charts)	30
UK Americana Albums (Official Charts)	3
UK Country Albums (Official Charts)	4
UK Independent Albums (Official Charts)	9
US Billboard 200	12
US Americana/Folk Albums (Billboard)	3
US Independent Albums (Billboard)	1
US Top Country Albums (Billboard)	4
