= Shaboozey =

American musician (born 1995)

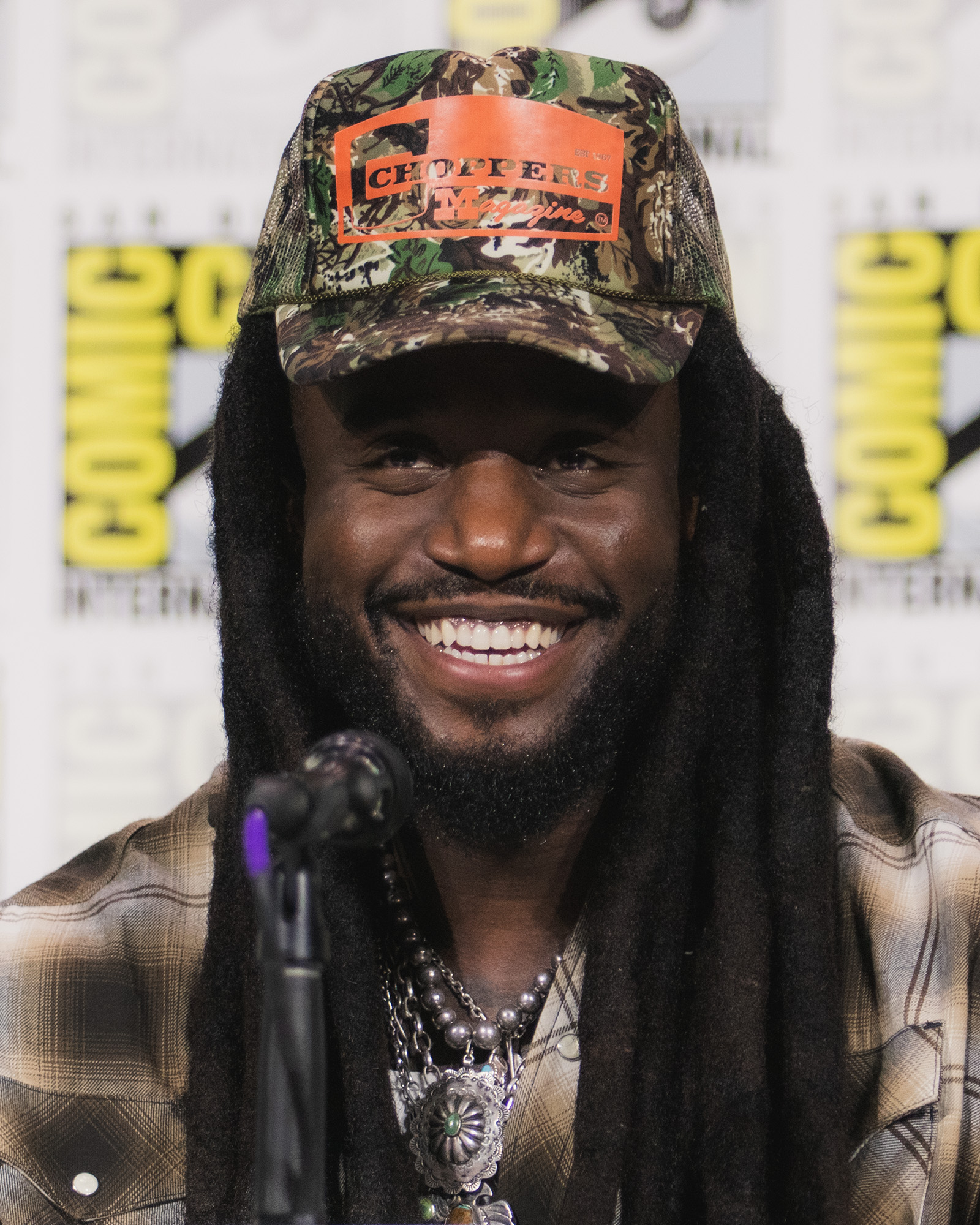
- Shaboozey in 2026

Background information
- Born: Collins Obinna Chibueze; May 9, 1995 (age 31); Woodbridge, Virginia, U.S.
- Genres: Country; Americana; hip-hop
- Occupations: Singer; rapper; songwriter; record producer
- Instruments: Vocals; guitar
- Years active: 2014–present
- Labels: Empire; American Dogwood
- Website: americandogwood.com

Collins Obinna Chibueze (born May 9, 1995), known professionally as Shaboozey, is an American singer. His music combines country, Americana, and hip-hop. After releasing two albums, Lady Wrangler (2018) and Cowboys Live Forever, Outlaws Never Die (2022), he gained wider recognition through his appearances on the soundtrack to Spider-Man: Into the Spider-Verse (2018) and Beyoncé's Cowboy Carter (2024).

His commercial breakthrough came with his third album, Where I've Been, Isn't Where I'm Going (2024), whose single "A Bar Song (Tipsy)", which spent nineteen weeks atop the Billboard Hot 100, tied with Lil Nas X's "Old Town Road" as the then-longest running Hot 100 number one song of all time. The follow-up single "Good News" topped the US Country Airplay chart and became a top 15 hit on the Hot 100. In 2025, he collaborated with Jelly Roll on "Amen", which won the Grammy Award for Best Country Duo/Group Performance.

He has also received three Billboard Music Awards, two People's Choice Country Awards and two iHeartRadio Music Awards.

== Early life ==
Chibueze was born and raised in Woodbridge, Virginia, in the Washington metropolitan area. His parents are Igbo Nigerians; his father was a farmer in Nigeria and attended college in Texas. His mother is a retired nurse. In his childhood, he was inspired by hip-hop music videos on 106 & Park, as well as his father's cowboy style of dress and love of country music. For junior high, he spent two years at a boarding school in Nigeria. In 2013, he graduated from Gar-Field Senior High School in Woodbridge, Virginia, where he played football as a freshman. As a teenager, Shaboozey planned to be a novelist. However, by the time he graduated high school, in addition to earning money from shooting music videos and photography, he also earned "a few hundred bucks here and there" from music gigs and decided to take music more seriously.

== Career ==
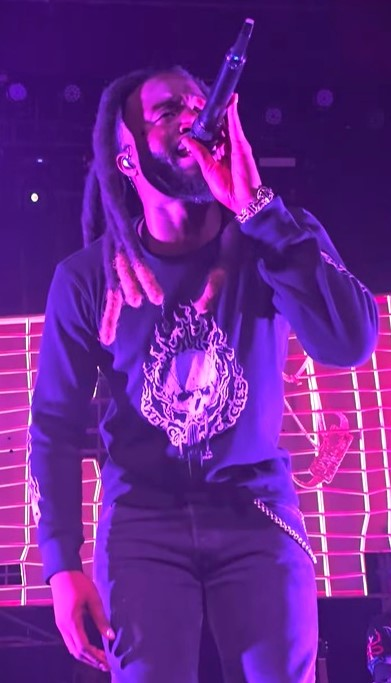
Shaboozey performing in Los Angeles, 2024

His stage name originated from a high school football coach's mispronunciation of his last name. The family name Chibuze is an Igbo word meaning "God is king".

In 2014, Shaboozey released his first single, "Jeff Gordon", referring to NASCAR driver Jeff Gordon. It is described as "a sparse trap song with a stealthy piano beat" and begins with overlapping audio from a NASCAR race.

Also in 2014, Shaboozey founded V Picture Films, a production company, with the goal of becoming a writer, director, and producer.

In August 2016, Shaboozey signed a recording, co-publishing and ancillary rights agreement with Terence Sheldon dba Homeless Records (assigned to Kreshendo Entertainment, a division of Republic Records, in September 2017), giving up 50% of the rights to his compositions while the agreement was in effect. The publishing agreement was terminated in November 2019.

In October 2018, Shaboozey released his debut studio album Lady Wrangler on Republic Records.

In 2018, Shaboozey was asked by Duckwrth to sing the hook for the song "Start a Riot". It went so well that Shaboozey was also asked to sing the second verse. The song, released in December 2018, was included in the soundtrack to Spider-Man: Into the Spider-Verse and led to national recognition for Shaboozey.

Shaboozey's second studio album, Cowboys Live Forever, Outlaws Never Die, was released in October 2022 via Empire Distribution. On the album, Shaboozey attempts to highlight the common themes between contemporary hip-hop and 19th century outlaw music in the American frontier.

In January 2024, after a member of Beyoncé's team heard Shaboozey's then-unreleased "A Bar Song (Tipsy)", Shaboozey was asked to sing on two songs with Beyoncé. The tracks were included on her eighth studio album, Cowboy Carter, released in March 2024. "A Bar Song (Tipsy)", which interpolates J-Kwon's 2004 single "Tipsy", was released in April 2024. The song spent nineteen weeks atop the Billboard Hot 100, tying with Lil Nas X's "Old Town Road" as the longest-running Hot 100 number-one song ever at the time.

Shaboozey's third studio album, Where I've Been, Isn't Where I'm Going, was released in May 2024. Though his earlier music had more of a trap influence, this album has more of a folk-pop sound with acoustic guitar. As of May 2024, Jared Cotter was Shaboozey's co-talent manager.

In November 2024, Shaboozey released "Good News". That month he also performed at the halftime show of the 2024 Chicago Bears–Detroit Lions Thanksgiving game.

In December 2024, Shaboozey was a musical guest on Saturday Night Live, where he performed "A Bar Song (Tipsy)" and "Good News". He also performed alongside Post Malone in the Beyoncé 2024 NFL Halftime Show at the Christmas Day Game between the Baltimore Ravens and the Houston Texans.

Shaboozey developed a new jingle for Domino's in October 2025. He announced his fourth album, a concept album titled The Outlaw Cherie Lee & Other Western Tales, in April 2026, with the project released on July 31, 2026. Shaboozey will embark on his "Outlaws Never Die Tour" in late 2026, with support from BigXthaPlug, Noeline Hofmann, Noah Cyrus, and others.

== Social activism ==
On February 1, 2026, during his Grammy acceptance speech, Shaboozey spoke out on the current immigration controversy, saying "immigrants built this country, literally". He also talked about this heritage as a vocal point as he was visibly emotional during his speech saying that his mom "worked three to four jobs just to provide for me and my four siblings as an immigrant in this country". "For all children of immigrants, this is also for those who came to this country in search of better opportunities, to be part of a nation that promised freedom for all and equal opportunity to everyone willing to work for it." "Thank you for bringing your culture, your music, your stories and your traditions. You give America color, I love y'all so much. Thank you."

The speech received criticism from some who felt the speech ignored the role Black and Indigenous people played in American history. Shaboozey responded on February 4, 2026, saying "To be clear, I know and believe that we—Black people, have also built this country. My words were not meant to erase, diminish, or overlook that truth, and I sincerely apologize for how they came across. That history, sacrifice, and resilience are undeniable, and I should have been more intentional in honoring that in my moment on stage."

Shaboozey has also spoken out about his ethnicity and how proud he is to be Black in country music. In an interview in 2025, Shaboozey said "I loved that there was so much room for some diversity in the space and to stand out. I love standing out," he says. "I love that I'm different. I think it's my superpower. [I'm] not feeling like I'm not allowed in this space because of the way I look or the way I dress or the way I present myself. If anything, hopefully it opens doors for people."

== Musical style and influences ==
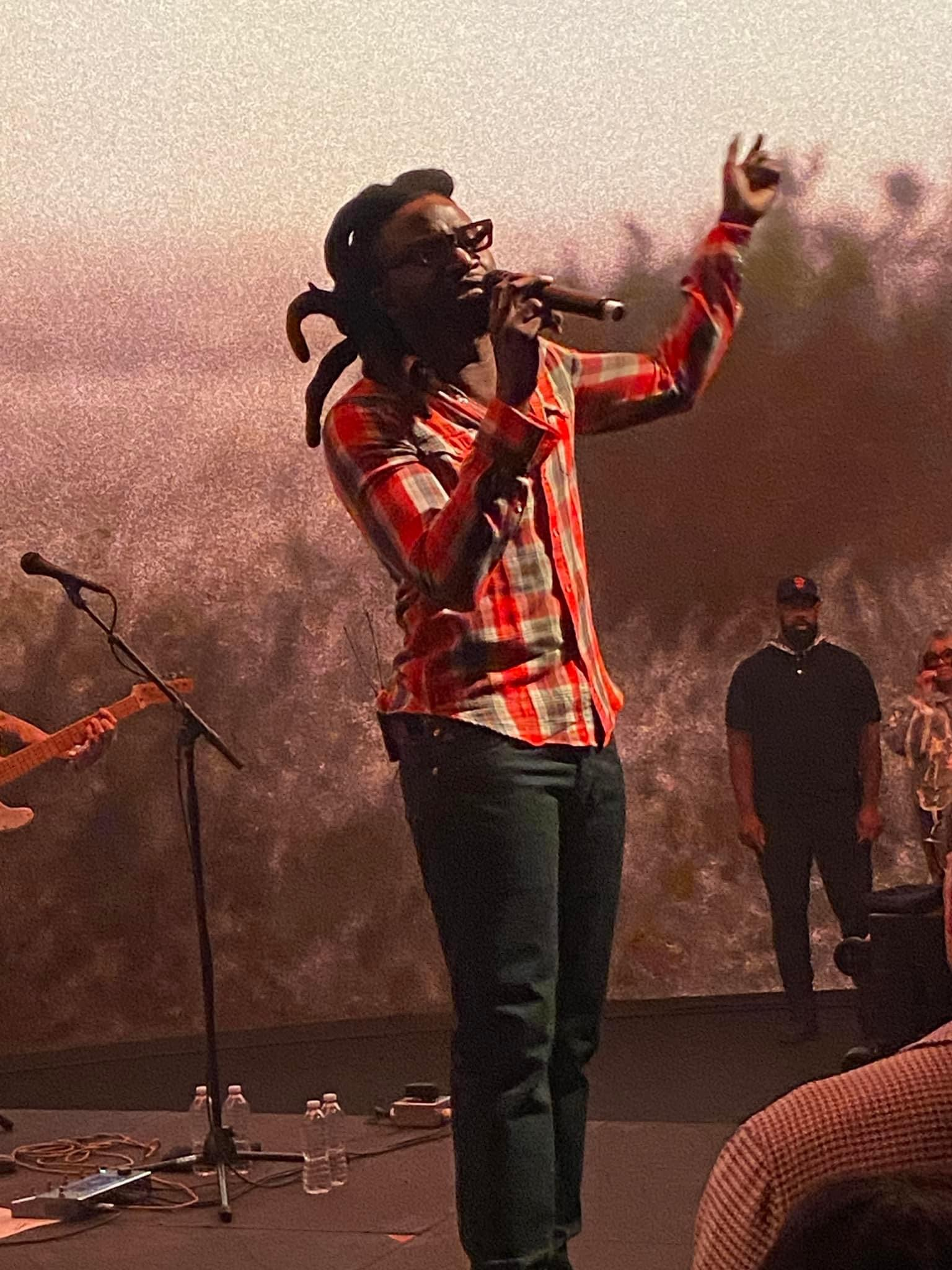
Shaboozey in 2024

Shaboozey's music combines hip-hop, country, rock, and Americana.

Shaboozey has cited the Rolling Stones, Grateful Dead, Bob Dylan, and Led Zeppelin as influences, as well as Martin Scorsese films such as Taxi Driver. Other influences include Fela Kuti, Clipse, Roger Waters, Backstreet Boys, Pharrell Williams, Missy Elliott, Lead Belly, and Johnny Cash.

Shaboozey has told reporters that he was exposed to country music by his Nigerian father, who "embodies Americana while holding on to his [roots.]"

Shaboozey was compelled by Western style; "When I moved to L.A. and started taking music seriously, I wore a lot of Western wear like denim, cowboy boots, and things like that. I remember going into the studio and I was like, 'Man, let's make a song that embodies what I'm wearing'."

== Tours ==
- Europe + UK Tour (2025)
- The Great American Roadshow (2025)
- Outlaws Never Die Tour (2026)

=== Opening act ===
- Jessie Murph – Live in the Sticks Tour (2024)
- Jelly Roll – Beautifully Broken Tour (2024)

== Discography ==
=== Studio albums ===
List of studio albums, with selected details, chart positions and certifications
Title	Album details	Peak chart positions							Certifications
Title	Album details	US	US Country	AUS	CAN	FIN	NOR	UK	Certifications
Lady Wrangler	Released: October 5, 2018; Label: Kreshendo, Republic; Format: Digital download, streaming	—	—	—	—	—	—	—	
Cowboys Live Forever, Outlaws Never Die	Released: October 7, 2022; Label: American Dogwood, Empire; Format: Digital download, streaming	—	—	—	—	—	—	—	
Where I've Been, Isn't Where I'm Going	Released: May 31, 2024; Label: American Dogwood, Empire; Format: Digital download, streaming, CD, vinyl	5	2	51	3	34	10	93	RIAA: Platinum; BPI: Gold
The Outlaw Cherie Lee & Other Western Tales	Released: July 31, 2026; Label: American Dogwood, Empire; Format: Digital download, streaming, CD, vinyl	12	4	52	39	—	—	—	
"—" denotes releases that did not chart or were not released in that territory.

=== Singles ===
List of singles, with selected chart positions, certifications, year released and album name
Title	Year	Peak chart positions										Certifications	Album
Title	Year	US	US Country	US Country Airplay	AUS	CAN	IRE	NZ	SWE	UK	WW	Certifications	Album
"Jeff Gordon"	2014	—	—	—	—	—	—	—	—	—	—		Non-album singles
"Starfoxx"	2017	—	—	—	—	—	—	—	—	—	—		Non-album singles
"Winning Streak"	2017	—	—	—	—	—	—	—	—	—	—		Lady Wrangler
"Robert Plant"	2017	—	—	—	—	—	—	—	—	—	—		Non-album singles
"Break the Band (How Could She?)"	2018	—	—	—	—	—	—	—	—	—	—		Non-album singles
"Golden Child"	2018	—	—	—	—	—	—	—	—	—	—		Lady Wrangler
"Cabelas"	2019	—	—	—	—	—	—	—	—	—	—		Non-album singles
"More"	2019	—	—	—	—	—	—	—	—	—	—		Non-album singles
"Joan Jett"	2019	—	—	—	—	—	—	—	—	—	—		Non-album singles
"Prosperity"	2019	—	—	—	—	—	—	—	—	—	—		Non-album singles
"I Can't Remember My Own Dreams"	2020	—	—	—	—	—	—	—	—	—	—		Non-album singles
"Another Me"	2020	—	—	—	—	—	—	—	—	—	—		Non-album singles
"Beverly Hills"	2021	—	—	—	—	—	—	—	—	—	—	RIAA: Gold	Cowboys Live Forever, Outlaws Never Die
"Tall Boy"	2021	—	—	—	—	—	—	—	—	—	—		Cowboys Live Forever, Outlaws Never Die
"Gas!"	2022	—	—	—	—	—	—	—	—	—	—		Cowboys Live Forever, Outlaws Never Die
"Let It Burn"	2023	—	—	—	—	—	—	—	—	—	—	RIAA: Gold	Where I've Been, Isn't Where I'm Going
"Anabelle"	2024	—	—	—	—	—	—	—	—	—	—		Where I've Been, Isn't Where I'm Going
"Vegas"	2024	—	—	—	—	—	—	—	—	—	—		Where I've Been, Isn't Where I'm Going
"A Bar Song (Tipsy)"	2024	1	1	1	1	1	1	3	1	3	3	RIAA: 12× Platinum(Diamond); ARIA: 2× Platinum; BPI: 4× Platinum; MC: 2× Diamond; GLF: Platinum; RMNZ: 7× Platinum	Where I've Been, Isn't Where I'm Going
"Highway"	2024	—	—	49	—	—	—	—	—	—	—		Where I've Been, Isn't Where I'm Going
"Good News"	2024	12	3	1	63	13	—	— (Note: "Good News" did not enter the NZ Top 40 Singles Chart, but peaked at number eight on the NZ Hot Singles Chart.)	— (Note: "Good News" did not enter the Swedish Singellista Chart, but peaked at number four on the Swedish Heatseeker Chart.)	— (Note: "Good News" did not enter the UK Singles Chart, but peaked at number 65 on the Single Sales Chart.)	156	RIAA: 2× Platinum; BPI: Silver; RMNZ: Platinum	Where I've Been, Isn't Where I'm Going: The Complete Edition
"Blink Twice" (with Myles Smith)	2025	— (Note: "Blink Twice" did not enter the Billboard Hot 100, but peaked at number 1 on the Bubbling Under Hot 100 chart.)	28	—	—	57	77	—	85	44	—		Where I've Been, Isn't Where I'm Going: The Complete Edition
"Home" (with BigXthaPlug)	2025	77	26	—	—	90	—	— (Note: "Home" did not enter the NZ Top 40 Singles Chart, but peaked at number 23 on the NZ Hot Singles Chart.)	—	—	—		I Hope You're Happy
"Took a Walk" (with Stephen Wilson Jr.)	2025	—	—	—	—	—	—	—	—	—	—		The Long Walk
"Let 'Em Know"	2025	—	36	—	—	—	—	— (Note: "Let 'Em Know" did not enter the NZ Top 40 Singles Chart, but peaked at number 31 on the NZ Hot Singles Chart.)	—	—	—		Non-album single
"Amen" (with Jelly Roll)	2025	27	6	1	—	30	—	— (Note: "Amen" did not enter the NZ Top 40 Singles Chart, but peaked at number six on the NZ Hot Singles Chart.)	—	—	—	RIAA: Platinum; RMNZ: Gold	Where I've Been, Isn't Where I'm Going: The Complete Edition
"Move On" (with Kevin Powers)	2025	— (Note: "Move On" did not enter the Billboard Hot 100, but peaked at number 25 on the Bubbling Under Hot 100 chart.)	40	16	—	—	—	—	—	—	—		Non-album single
"Born to Die"	2026	— (Note: "Born to Die" did not enter the Billboard Hot 100, but peaked at number 10 on the Bubbling Under Hot 100 chart.)	36	—	—	82	—	— (Note: "Born to Die" did not enter the NZ Top 40 Singles Chart, but peaked at number 14 on the NZ Hot Singles Chart.)	—	—	—		The Outlaw Cherie Lee & Other Western Tales
"Cowgirl"	2026	42	11	19	—	21	—	— (Note: "Cowgirl" did not enter the NZ Top 40 Singles Chart, but peaked at number 12 on the NZ Hot Singles Chart.)	—	52	—		The Outlaw Cherie Lee & Other Western Tales
"Burn It Down" (featuring Leon Bridges)	2026	—	50	—	—	—	—	— (Note: "Burn It Down" did not enter the NZ Top 40 Singles Chart, but peaked at number 21 on the NZ Hot Singles Chart.)	—	—	—		The Outlaw Cherie Lee & Other Western Tales
"—" denotes releases that did not chart or were not released in that territory.

=== Other charted songs ===
List of other charted songs, with selected chart positions, year released and album name
Title	Year	Peak chart positions							Certifications	Album
Title	Year	US	US Country	US R&B /HH	BRA	CAN	NZ Hot	WW	Certifications	Album
"Spaghettii" (with Beyoncé and Linda Martell)	2024	31	—	12	65	58	—	37		Cowboy Carter
"Sweet / Honey / Buckiin'" (with Beyoncé)	2024	61	—	22	—	94	—	109		Cowboy Carter
"My Fault" (featuring Noah Cyrus)	2024	— (Note: "My Fault" did not enter the Billboard Hot 100, but peaked at number 24 on the Bubbling Under Hot 100 chart.)	40	—	—	—	23	—		Where I've Been, Isn't Where I'm Going
"Drink Don't Need No Mix" (featuring BigXthaPlug)	2024	—	47	45	—	—	37	—	RIAA: Gold	Where I've Been, Isn't Where I'm Going
"Last of My Kind"(featuring Paul Cauthen)	2024	—	42	—	—	—	—	—	RIAA: Gold	Where I've Been, Isn't Where I'm Going
"Bullets & Blades" (with Kehlani)	2026	— (Note: "Bullets & Blades" did not enter the Billboard Hot 100, but peaked at number 19 on the Bubbling Under Hot 100 chart.)	42	—	—	—	16	—		The Outlaw Cherie Lee & Other Western Tales
"—" denotes releases that did not chart or were not released in that territory.

== Awards and nominations ==
Shaboozey received nominations at the 67th Annual Grammy Awards for Song of the Year, Best New Artist, Best Country Song, Best Country Solo Performance, and Best Melodic Rap Performance. He also received nominations at the 68th Annual Grammy Awards for Best Country Duo/Group Performance, Best Country Song, and Best Country Solo Performance.

Award	Year	Work	Category	Result	Ref.
Academy of Country Music Awards	2025	"A Bar Song (Tipsy)"	Single of the Year	Nominated	
Academy of Country Music Awards	2025	Himself	New Male Artist of the Year	Nominated	
Academy of Country Music Awards	2026	Himself	New Male Artist of the Year	Nominated	
Academy of Country Music Awards	2026	"Amen" (with Jelly Roll)	Musical Event of the Year	Nominated	
American Music Awards	2025	Himself	New Artist of the Year	Nominated	
American Music Awards	2025	Himself	Favorite Country Male Artist	Nominated	
American Music Awards	2025	"A Bar Song (Tipsy)"	Song of the Year	Nominated	
American Music Awards	2025	"A Bar Song (Tipsy)"	Favorite Country Song	Nominated	
American Music Awards	2025	"A Bar Song (Tipsy)"	Social Song of the Year	Nominated	
American Music Awards	2025	"A Bar Song (Tipsy)"	Favorite Music Video	Nominated	
American Music Awards	2025	Where I've Been, Isn't Where I'm Going	Favorite Country Album	Nominated	
American Music Awards	2026	"Amen" (with Jelly Roll)	Collaboration of the Year	Nominated	
American Music Awards	2026	"Good News"	Best Country Song	Nominated	
American Music Awards	2026	Himself	Best Male Country Artist	Nominated	
APRA Awards (Australia)	2025	"A Bar Song (Tipsy)"	Most Performed International Work	Nominated	
Billboard Music Awards	2024	Himself	Top New Artist	Nominated	
Billboard Music Awards	2024	Himself	Top Song Sales Artist	Won	
Billboard Music Awards	2024	"A Bar Song (Tipsy)"	Top Hot 100 Song	Nominated	
Billboard Music Awards	2024	"A Bar Song (Tipsy)"	Top Streaming Song	Nominated	
Billboard Music Awards	2024	"A Bar Song (Tipsy)"	Top Selling Song	Won	
Billboard Music Awards	2024	"A Bar Song (Tipsy)"	Top Country Song	Won	
Brit Awards	2024	"A Bar Song (Tipsy)"	International Song of the Year	Nominated	
Country Music Association Awards	2024	"A Bar Song (Tipsy)"	Single of the Year	Nominated	
Country Music Association Awards	2024	Himself	New Artist of the Year	Nominated	
Country Music Association Awards	2025	Himself	New Artist of the Year	Nominated	
Grammy Awards	2025	Himself	Best New Artist	Nominated	
Grammy Awards	2025	"Spaghettii" (with Beyoncé and Linda Martell)	Best Melodic Rap Performance	Nominated	
Grammy Awards	2025	"A Bar Song (Tipsy)"	Song of the Year	Nominated	
Grammy Awards	2025	"A Bar Song (Tipsy)"	Best Country Song	Nominated	
Grammy Awards	2025	"A Bar Song (Tipsy)"	Best Country Solo Performance	Nominated	
Grammy Awards	2026	"Good News"	Best Country Solo Performance	Nominated	
Grammy Awards	2026	"Good News"	Best Country Song	Nominated	
Grammy Awards	2026	"Amen" (with Jelly Roll)	Best Country Duo/Group Performance	Won	
iHeartRadio Music Awards	2025	Himself	Best New Country Artist	Won	
iHeartRadio Music Awards	2025	Himself	Best New Pop Artist	Nominated	
iHeartRadio Music Awards	2025	"A Bar Song (Tipsy)"	Song of the Year	Nominated	
iHeartRadio Music Awards	2025	"A Bar Song (Tipsy)"	Country Song of the Year	Nominated	
iHeartRadio Music Awards	2026	"Good News	Song of the Year	Nominated	
iHeartRadio Music Awards	2026	"Good News	Country Song of the Year	Won	
MTV Video Music Awards	2024	Himself	Best New Artist	Nominated	
MTV Video Music Awards	2024	"A Bar Song (Tipsy)"	Song of Summer	Nominated	
MTV Video Music Awards	2026	"Cowgirl"	Best Country	Nominated	
MTV Video Music Awards	2026	"Cowgirl"	Best Cinematography	Nominated	
NAACP Image Awards	2025	Himself	Outstanding New Artist	Nominated	
People's Choice Country Awards	2024	Himself	New Artist of 2024	Won	
People's Choice Country Awards	2024	Where I've Been, Isn't Where I'm Going	Album of 2024	Nominated	
People's Choice Country Awards	2024	"A Bar Song (Tipsy)"	Song of 2024	Nominated	
People's Choice Country Awards	2024	"A Bar Song (Tipsy)"	Male Song of 2024	Nominated	
People's Choice Country Awards	2024	"A Bar Song (Tipsy)"	New Artist Song of 2024	Won	
People's Choice Country Awards	2024	"My Fault" (featuring Noah Cyrus)	Crossover Song of 2024	Nominated	
People's Choice Country Awards	2024	"Let It Burn"	Music Video of 2024	Nominated	
