= Born to Die (Shaboozey song) =

2026 song by Shaboozey

Single by Shaboozey

from the album The Outlaw Cherie Lee & Other Western Tales
- Released: April 24, 2026
- Genre: Country
- Length: 2:45
- Label: American Dogwood; Empire
- Songwriters: Collins Chibueze; Daniel Majic; Sean Cook; Nevin Sastry; Jackson Foote; Seth Ennis; Jordan Gray
- Producers: Sean Cook; Nevin Sastry

Shaboozey singles chronology
"Amen" (2025)	"Born to Die" (2026)	"Cowgirl" (2026)

"Born to Die" is a song by American musician Shaboozey. It was released on April 24, 2026, as the lead single from his fourth studio album, The Outlaw Cherie Lee & Other Western Tales (2026).

== Composition ==
The song centers on themes of mortality, reflection, and embracing life despite its impermanence, with Shaboozey framing the narrative around living in the moment even while acknowledging life's inevitable end.

== Charts ==
=== Weekly charts ===
Weekly chart performance
Chart (2026)	Peak position
Canada Hot 100 (Billboard)	82
Czech Republic Airplay (ČNS IFPI)	6
Germany Airplay (BVMI)	84
Lithuania Airplay (TopHit)	31
New Zealand Hot Singles (RMNZ)	14
US Bubbling Under Hot 100 (Billboard)	10
US Hot Country Songs (Billboard)	36

=== Monthly charts ===
Monthly chart performance
Chart (2026)	Peak position
Lithuania Airplay (TopHit)	40
