= Amen (Shaboozey and Jelly Roll song) =

2025 song by Shaboozey and Jelly Roll

Single by Shaboozey and Jelly Roll

from the album Where I've Been, Isn't Where I'm Going
- Released: October 15, 2025
- Genre: Country
- Length: 3:17
- Label: American Dogwood; Empire
- Songwriters: Collins Chibueze; Jason DeFord; Daniel Majic; Sean Cook; Nevin Sastry; Jackson Foote; Seth Ennis; Jordan Gray; Kevin Powers
- Producers: Danny Majic; Sean Cook; Nevin

Shaboozey singles chronology
"Let 'Em Know" (2025)	"Amen" (2025)	"Born to Die" (2026)

Jelly Roll singles chronology
"Living Proof" (2025)	"Amen" (2025)	"Lighter" (2026)

"Amen" is a song by American musicians Shaboozey and Jelly Roll. It was released on country radio on October 15, 2025, as the third single from the complete edition of the former's third studio album Where I've Been, Isn't Where I'm Going (2025). It was produced by Danny Majic, Nevin Sastry and Sean Cook. Peaking in the top ten across charts in New Zealand, Canada and the United States, the track secured a Grammy Award for Best Country Duo/Group Performance.

The track was also nominated for Collaboration of the Year at the American Music Awards and Music Event of the Year at the ACM Awards.

== Composition ==
The song centers on the artists battling their inner demons and looking for hope and grace. The instrumental opens with a twangy guitar riff and introduces more elements over the course of the first verse, in which Shaboozey reflects on his mistakes and worries that he might have destroyed his relationship with God. Drum patterns enter the instrumental during the chorus, in which the protagonist begs for someone to say a prayer for him, as his unhealthy ways of coping are not working. In the second verse, Jelly Roll sings that while he currently lacks direction in life, he hopes for a positive future where he will not feel ashamed of himself, nor will God.

== Accolades ==
Organization	Year	Category	Result	Ref.
Grammy Awards	2026	Best Country Duo/Group Performance	Won	

== Charts ==
=== Weekly charts ===
Weekly chart performance for "Amen"
Chart (2025–2026)	Peak position
Canada Hot 100 (Billboard)	30
Canada Country (Billboard)	2
New Zealand Hot Singles (RMNZ)	6
US Billboard Hot 100	27
US Country Airplay (Billboard)	1
US Hot Country Songs (Billboard)	6

=== Year-end charts ===
Year-end chart performance for "Amen"
Chart (2025)	Position
Canada (Canadian Hot 100)	83
US Hot Country Songs (Billboard)	30

== Certifications ==
Certifications and sales for "Amen"
Region	Certification	Certified units/sales
New Zealand (RMNZ)	Gold	15,000^{‡}
United States (RIAA)	Platinum	1,000,000^{‡}
^{‡} Sales+streaming figures based on certification alone.
