= Blink Twice (Shaboozey and Myles Smith song) =

2025 single by Shaboozey and Myles Smith

Single by Shaboozey and Myles Smith

from the album Where I've Been, Isn't Where I'm Going
- Released: April 11, 2025
- Genre: Country; folk
- Length: 2:36
- Label: American Dogwood; Empire
- Songwriters: Collins Chibueze; Myles Smith-Thompson; Barrett Conner; Sam Westhoff
- Producers: Haffway; Nevin; Sean Cook

Shaboozey singles chronology
"Good News" (2024)	"Blink Twice" (2025)	"Home" (2025)

Myles Smith singles chronology
"Nice To Meet You" (2025)	"Blink Twice" (2025)	"My First Heartbreak" (2025)

Music video
- "Blink Twice" on YouTube

"Blink Twice" is a song by American musician Shaboozey and British singer Myles Smith, released on April 11, 2025, as the second single from the complete edition of Shaboozey's third studio album, Where I've Been, Isn't Where I'm Going (2025). It was produced by Sean Cook and Nevin Sastry. The song was used in the soundtrack for Madden NFL 26.

== Background ==
Shaboozey teased the song in March 2025, after which it gained recognition on the video-sharing app TikTok. On April 9, 2025, he and Myles Smith debuted the song live at Smith's concert in Los Angeles' Wiltern Theatre.

== Composition ==
"Blink Twice" is a folk-influenced song. The instrumental consists of a guitar riff that is finger-picked and played with a twang, a pounding drum pattern and stomps and claps. Lyrically, it finds the singers in reflection of their emotional anguish and vulnerability and feelings of isolation, but being determined to not give up hope and positivity.

== Music video ==
The music video for “Blink Twice” was directed by Logan Meis and released in April 2025.

== Charts ==
=== Weekly charts ===
Weekly chart performance for "Blink Twice"
Chart (2025–2026)	Peak position
Canada Hot 100 (Billboard)	57
Croatia International Airplay (Top lista)	14
Estonia Airplay (TopHit)	8
Ireland (IRMA)	77
Lithuania Airplay (TopHit)	23
Malta Airplay (Radiomonitor)	16
Netherlands (Dutch Top 40)	20
Netherlands (Single Tip)	5
Portugal Airplay (AFP)	47
Romania Airplay (TopHit)	75
Slovakia Airplay (ČNS IFPI)	19
Slovenia Airplay (Radiomonitor)	12
Sweden (Sverigetopplistan)	85
UK Singles (Official Charts)	44
US Bubbling Under Hot 100 (Billboard)	1
US Hot Country Songs (Billboard)	28

=== Monthly charts ===
Monthly chart performance for "Blink Twice"
Chart (2025–2026)	Peak position
Estonia Airplay (TopHit)	11
Lithuania Airplay (TopHit)	38
Romania Airplay (TopHit)	92

=== Year-end charts ===
Year-end chart performance for "Blink Twice"
Chart (2025)	Position
Belgium (Ultratop 50 Flanders)	57
Estonia Airplay (TopHit)	16
Netherlands (Dutch Top 40)	56
