= A Bar Song (Tipsy) =

Single by Shaboozey

from the album Where I've Been, Isn't Where I'm Going
- Released: April 12, 2024
- Genre: Country pop; country rap
- Length: 2:53
- Label: American Dogwood; Magnolia; Empire
- Songwriters: Collins Chibueze; Nevin Sastry; Sean Cook; Jerrell Jones; Joe Kent; Mark Williams
- Producers: Nevin; Sean Cook

Shaboozey singles chronology
"Vegas" (2024)	"A Bar Song (Tipsy)" (2024)	"Highway" (2024)

Music video
- "A Bar Song (Tipsy)" on YouTube

"A Bar Song (Tipsy)" is a song by American musician Shaboozey. It was released April 12, 2024, as the fourth single from his third album Where I've Been, Isn't Where I'm Going. The song tied "Old Town Road" by Lil Nas X as the longest-running number-one song of all time on the Billboard Hot 100 with 19 non-consecutive weeks at the top of the chart, and the longest by a solo artist (later surpassed by Mariah Carey's "All I Want for Christmas Is You" and Ella Langley's "Choosin' Texas"). Outside of the United States, "A Bar Song (Tipsy)" topped the charts in Australia, Belgium (Flanders), Canada, Ireland, Norway, and Sweden, and peaked within the top ten of the charts in Austria, Belgium (Wallonia), Denmark, Iceland, the Netherlands, New Zealand, Russia, South Africa, Switzerland, and the United Kingdom.

"A Bar Song (Tipsy)" was nominated for Song of the Year, Best Country Song, and Best Country Solo Performance at the 67th Annual Grammy Awards, with the David Guetta remix additionally being nominated for Best Remixed Recording, Non-Classical and Shaboozey also being nominated for Best New Artist.

== Release and composition ==
Shaboozey released "A Bar Song (Tipsy)" on April 12, 2024. The song interpolates the clean version of J-Kwon's 2004 single "Tipsy". The song is about a narrator who is frustrated from hard work at his job, and takes out his frustrations by drinking alcohol at a bar and having fun. The song is in the key of A major and is in common time, with a tempo of 81 beats per minute. The chord progression includes F♯m–A–D–E.

There were also remixes released, from Swedish DJ Alesso and French DJ David Guetta.

== Critical reception ==
The song received critical acclaim. Chris Molanphy of Slate wrote that "A Bar Song" "fuses the kid-friendly counting lyrics from J-Kwon's original rap hit ... with more adult concerns that reflect our current national malaise" and "is at once digitally savvy, culturally old-school, and as American as a trucker hat". Ashley Pointer of NPR described the song as having an "infectious hook encapsulating a rowdy energy made for celebrations and singalongs". NPR included it in its list of 124 Best Songs of 2024.

== Commercial performance ==
"A Bar Song (Tipsy)" was a number-one hit on Billboard's Hot Country Songs chart. As it succeeded Beyoncé's "Texas Hold 'Em" at the top, this was the first time in history that two black artists held the number-one position there in consecutive weeks. This song made Shaboozey the first male black artist to chart at number one on Billboard's Hot 100 and Hot Country Songs charts at the same time; Beyoncé had previously become the first black artist to do so with "Texas Hold 'Em". The song also made Shaboozey the first male black artist to chart at number one on Billboard's Hot Country Songs and Country Airplay charts at the same time. In addition, it spent seven weeks at number one on the latter chart, surpassing the record for the longest-running number one debut single previously set by Carrie Underwood's "Jesus, Take the Wheel", which spent six weeks at the top in January–February 2006. The song spent 25 non-consecutive weeks at number one on the Canadian Hot 100, breaking the record for the longest-running number-one hit ever on the chart set by "Old Town Road" by Lil Nas X featuring Billy Ray Cyrus in 2019. On the Billboard Hot 100, it became the longest-running number one song in the chart's history, tying the record set five years earlier by "Old Town Road". It was named the top single of 2024 by RIAA.

"A Bar Song (Tipsy)" was a top-ten hit in several international markets. For two Billboard tracking years (Note: A Billboard tracking year begins at the final few weeks of the previous year and ends a month away from the next.) in a row, the song was the best-performing entry on the Canadian Hot 100. In Sweden, "A Bar Song (Tipsy)" had two six-week periods at number one, separated apart by three weeks, totaling to 12 non-consecutive weeks. It also had five consecutive weeks at the top spot in Australia, three non-consecutive in Flanders and Norway each, and one in Ireland. In the UK, the song spent eight non-consecutive weeks at number three on the UK Singles Chart. It was the most sold song in the country for four non-consecutive weeks, in particular being the most-downloaded of five, and the second most-streamed for one. It also spent 39 non-consecutive weeks at number one on the country's Independent Singles Chart, starting in May 2024 and well into March 2025.

== Charts ==
=== Weekly charts ===
Weekly chart performance for "A Bar Song (Tipsy)"
Chart (2024–2025)	Peak position
Australia (ARIA)	1
Australia Country Hot 50 (The Music)	1
Austria (Ö3 Austria Top 40)	3
Belarus Airplay (TopHit)	16
Belgium (Ultratop 50 Flanders)	1
Belgium (Ultratop 50 Wallonia)	8
Brazil Airplay (Top 100 Brasil)	72
Canada Hot 100 (Billboard)	1
Canada AC (Billboard)	5
Canada CHR/Top 40 (Billboard)	1
Canada Country (Billboard)	1
Canada Hot AC (Billboard)	1
Colombia Anglo Airplay (National-Report)	2
CIS Airplay (TopHit)	3
Croatia International Airplay (Top lista)	3
Czech Republic Airplay (ČNS IFPI)	2
Czech Republic Singles Digital (ČNS IFPI)	50
Denmark (Tracklisten)	8
Estonia Airplay (TopHit)	1
Finland (Suomen virallinen lista)	50
Finland Airplay (Radiosoittolista)	2
France (SNEP)	72
Germany (GfK)	14
Global 200 (Billboard)	3
Greece International (IFPI)	85
Hungary (Editors' Choice Top 40)	15
Iceland (Tónlistinn)	4
Ireland (IRMA)	1
Kazakhstan Airplay (TopHit)	7
Latvia Airplay (LaIPA)	1
Latvia Airplay (TopHit) Alesso Remix	47
Latvia Airplay (TopHit) David Guetta Remix	53
Latvia Streaming (LaIPA)	16
Lebanon (Lebanese Top 20)	4
Lithuania (AGATA)	70
Lithuania Airplay (TopHit)	3
Luxembourg (Billboard)	11
Malta Airplay (Radiomonitor)	7
Moldova Airplay (TopHit)	91
Netherlands (Dutch Top 40)	2
Netherlands (Single Top 100)	8
New Zealand (Recorded Music NZ)	3
Norway (VG-lista)	1
Poland (Polish Airplay Top 100)	29
Portugal (AFP)	91
Romania Airplay (TopHit)	49
Russia Airplay (TopHit)	10
Russia Airplay (TopHit) David Guetta Remix	66
San Marino Airplay (SMRTV Top 50)	23
Serbia Airplay (Radiomonitor)	5
Slovakia Airplay (ČNS IFPI)	1
Slovakia Singles Digital (ČNS IFPI)	29
Slovenia Airplay (Radiomonitor)	1
South Africa Streaming (TOSAC)	2
Suriname (Nationale Top 40)	31
Sweden (Sverigetopplistan)	1
Switzerland (Schweizer Hitparade)	4
Ukraine Airplay (TopHit)	27
UK Singles (Official Charts)	3
UK Country Airplay (Radiomonitor)	1
UK Indie (Official Charts)	1
US Billboard Hot 100	1
US Adult Contemporary (Billboard)	5
US Adult Pop Airplay (Billboard)	1
US Country Airplay (Billboard)	1
US Hot Country Songs (Billboard)	1
US Pop Airplay (Billboard)	1
US R&B/Hip-Hop Airplay (Billboard)	49
US Rhythmic Airplay (Billboard)	3

=== Monthly charts ===
Monthly chart performance for "A Bar Song (Tipsy)"
Chart (2024–2025)	Peak position
Belarus Airplay (TopHit)	21
CIS Airplay (TopHit)	3
Czech Republic (Rádio Top 100)	2
Czech Republic (Singles Digitál Top 100)	55
Estonia Airplay (TopHit)	1
Kazakhstan Airplay (TopHit)	10
Latvia Airplay (TopHit) Alesso Remix	50
Latvia Airplay (TopHit) David Guetta Remix	55
Lithuania Airplay (TopHit)	3
Romania Airplay (TopHit)	51
Russia Airplay (TopHit)	12
Russia Airplay (TopHit) David Guetta Remix	72
Slovakia (Rádio Top 100)	2
Slovakia (Singles Digitál Top 100)	42

=== Year-end charts ===
2024 year-end chart performance for "A Bar Song (Tipsy)"
Chart (2024)	Position
Australia (ARIA)	2
Austria (Ö3 Austria Top 40)	10
Belarus Airplay (TopHit)	75
Belgium (Ultratop 50 Flanders)	7
Belgium (Ultratop 50 Wallonia)	57
Canada (Canadian Hot 100)	1
CIS Airplay (TopHit)	15
Denmark (Tracklisten)	20
Estonia Airplay (TopHit)	11
Germany (GfK)	36
Global 200 (Billboard)	6
Iceland (Tónlistinn)	8
Kazakhstan Airplay (TopHit)	90
Lithuania Airplay (TopHit)	9
Netherlands (Dutch Top 40)	1
Netherlands (Single Top 100)	16
New Zealand (Recorded Music NZ)	6
Russia Airplay (TopHit)	43
South Africa (TOSAC)	8
Sweden (Sverigetopplistan)	1
Switzerland (Schweizer Hitparade)	11
UK Singles (OCC)	6
US Billboard Hot 100	2
US Adult Contemporary (Billboard)	36
US Adult Pop Airplay (Billboard)	12
US Country Airplay (Billboard)	8
US Hot Country Songs (Billboard)	1
US Pop Airplay (Billboard)	11
US Rhythmic (Billboard)	24

2025 year-end chart performance for "A Bar Song (Tipsy)"
Chart (2025)	Position
Australia (ARIA)	9
Austria (Ö3 Austria Top 40)	40
Belarus Airplay (TopHit)	105
Belgium (Ultratop 50 Flanders)	28
Belgium (Ultratop 50 Wallonia)	120
Canada (Canadian Hot 100)	1
Canada AC (Billboard)	12
Canada CHR/Top 40 (Billboard)	47
Canada Country (Billboard)	90
Canada Hot AC (Billboard)	9
CIS Airplay (TopHit)	33
Estonia Airplay (TopHit)	30
Germany (GfK)	35
Global 200 (Billboard)	15
Lithuania Airplay (TopHit)	59
New Zealand (Recorded Music NZ)	14
Russia Airplay (TopHit)	109
Sweden (Sverigetopplistan)	28
Switzerland (Schweizer Hitparade)	23
UK Singles (OCC)	27
US Billboard Hot 100	3
US Adult Contemporary (Billboard)	7
US Adult Pop Airplay (Billboard)	7
US Country Airplay (Billboard)	15
US Hot Country Songs (Billboard)	1
US Pop Airplay (Billboard)	14

== Certifications ==
Certifications for "A Bar Song (Tipsy)"
Region	Certification	Certified units/sales
Australia (ARIA)	2× Platinum	140,000^{‡}
Belgium (BRMA)	Platinum	40,000^{‡}
Canada (Music Canada)	2× Diamond	1,600,000^{‡}
Denmark (IFPI Danmark)	2× Platinum	180,000^{‡}
France (SNEP)	Platinum	200,000^{‡}
Italy (FIMI)	Gold	50,000^{‡}
New Zealand (RMNZ)	7× Platinum	210,000^{‡}
Spain (Promusicae)	Gold	30,000^{‡}
United Kingdom (BPI)	4× Platinum	2,400,000^{‡}
United States (RIAA)	12× Platinum	12,000,000^{‡}
Streaming
Sweden (GLF)	Platinum	12,000,000^{†}
Worldwide	—	1,510,000,000
^{‡} Sales+streaming figures based on certification alone.^{†} Streaming-only figures based on certification alone.
