= Paul Cauthen =

American singer-songwriter (born 1986)

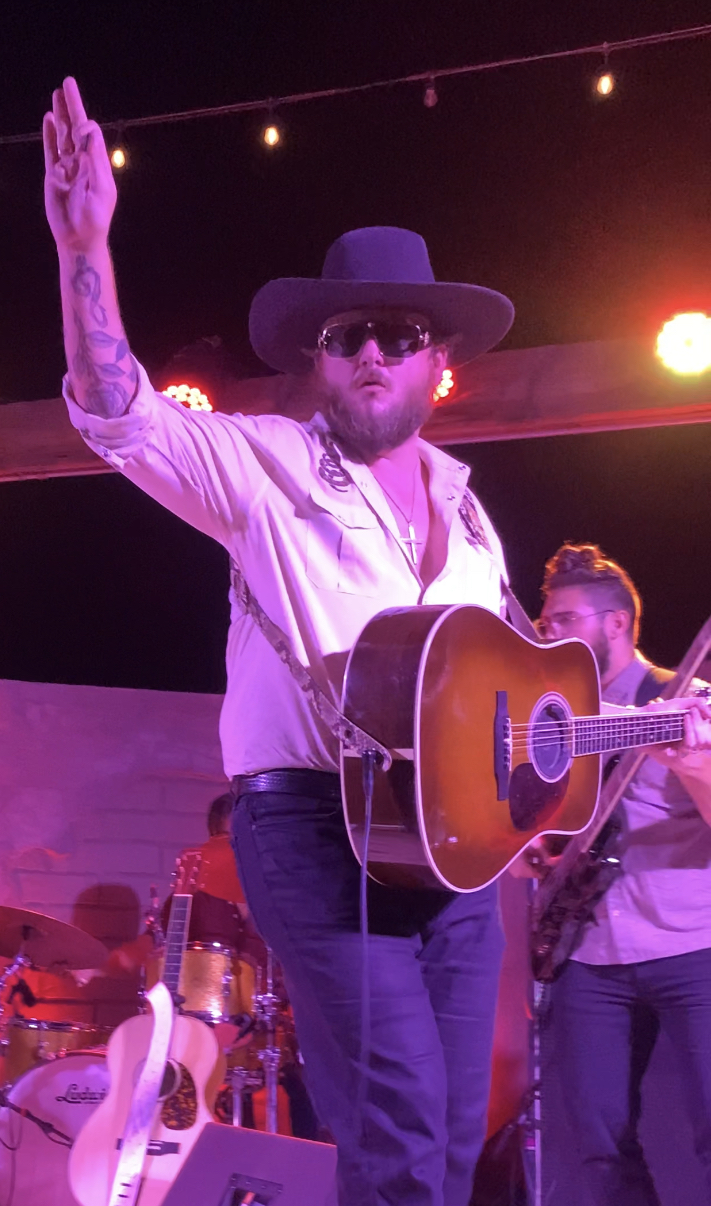
- Cauthen playing a show at Pappys and Harriet's in Pioneertown, California in 2021

Background information
- Also known as: Paul Cauthen's Big Velvet Revue
- Born: Paul Mark Cauthen; 1985 or 1986 (age 39–40); Tyler, Texas, U.S.
- Genres: Country rock; neotraditional country; alternative country; outlaw country; Americana
- Occupation: Singer-songwriter
- Instruments: Vocals; guitar; piano
- Years active: 2009–present
- Spouse: Elizabeth Cauthen
- Website: paulcauthenmusic.com

Paul Mark Cauthen (born 1985/1986) is an American singer-songwriter from East Texas. He started his music career in an Americana/indie folk rock duo called Sons of Fathers, before turning solo. He has released five albums and an EP as a solo artist, the most recent being Book of Paul released on 3 April, 2026.

== Early life ==
Cauthen was born in Dallas, Texas. He grew up in a religious household. His father was a song leader in the conservative Christian Church of Christ, and his father's twin brother was the preacher there. Cauthen's father and uncle sang as a musical duo in church. Cauthen has said that the church he grew up in did not allow instruments, so the focus was on a cappella singing of what he called "heavenly highway hymns, the old hymnals", but that if he were active in the church, he would be a fifth-generation song leader/preacher.

Cauthen has said that his family is from Texas on both sides. His grandmother's family was from West Texas as well as part of New Mexico because her father sold drill bits for oil wells. Cauthen's father is a fifth-generation Texan via Montgomery, Alabama, where Cauthen's paternal grandfather went to school with Hank Williams.

Although his maternal grandfather Jim Paul Cauthen died when he was 10 years old, Cauthen was deeply influenced by his grandfather, who gave him a guitar and was a songwriter himself. Cauthen was his only male grandchild. Cauthen's grandfather also taught him – and his two sisters – how to sing harmonies at a very young age. Cauthen's grandmother taught him piano. Jim Paul Cauthen had spent time in the 1950s with Buddy Holly and The Crickets and was good friends with Holly's bandmate Sonny Curtis, who later fronted The Crickets.

== Career ==
=== Sons of Fathers ===
Cauthen got his start playing in an Americana/indie folk rock band singer-songwriter duo with musician David Beck. Cauthen met Beck, whose father was Bill Whitbeck, long-time Robert Earl Keen bass player, in San Marcos, Texas in 2009. They got to know each other at a regular local songwriter's night series at Cheatham Street Warehouse. Beck gave deejay Jessie Scott their demo, who gave their demo to manager Marty Schwartz, who came out of retirement to manage the duo. The band was initially called Beck & Cauthen but they later changed the name of the band to be Sons of Fathers when musician Beck sent a cease and desist letter. Sons of Fathers featured Beck on the upright bass and Cauthen on guitar, with both singing vocals.

Both their 2011 and 2013 Sons of Fathers records, the self-titled Sons of Fathers and Burning Days, were produced by Lloyd Maines. Burning Days featured Regan Schmidt on lap steel/electric guitar, Dees Stribling on drums, Bryan Mammel on keyboards/accordion, Tony Browne on guitar/mandolin. The record also features Maines on pedal steel and Corby Schaub on guitar.

The duo also had a studio called Fast Horse Studios where they produced records by local bands like Canvas People, Carson McHone, Luke Bell, Pake Rossi, and others.

In April 2014, after five years together, the Sons of Fathers broke up. Cauthen cited differing musical focuses.

=== Solo career ===
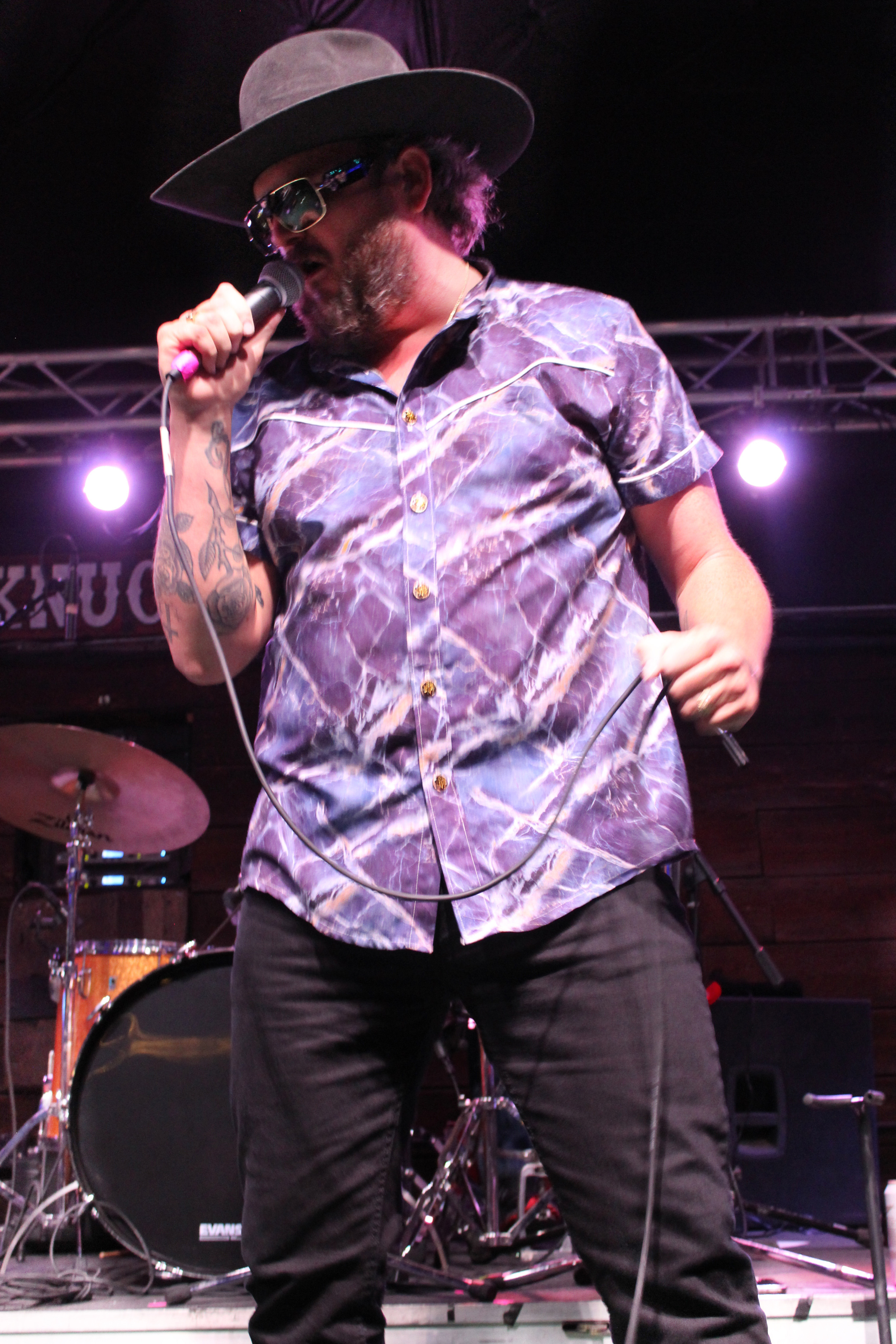
Cauthen live in Kansas City, 2022

In 2016, in a shift from singing as a duo to lead vocals, Cauthen released his first solo record called My Gospel on Lightning Rod Records. Parts of the record were recorded in Muscle Shoals, Alabama and features the work of Los Angeles-based multi-instrumentalist, Gus Seyffert. The song, "As Young As You'll Ever Be" is about the death of Cauthen's friend, the San Marcos, Texas-based singer-songwriter Victor Holk. My Gospel was listed as number 23 of Rolling Stone magazine's top 40 country records of 2016.

In 2018, Cauthen released the EP, Have Mercy. The EP, recorded live at Modern Electric in Dallas, was produced by Beau Bedford, whose band the Texas Gentlemen appears on the record. A notable song off the EP was the opening track, "Everybody Walking This Land", which calls out hate and complicit racism. That song, "Everybody Walking This Land", was used in the end credits to the season 2 opener of the Starz network TV show, American Gods.

On June 22, 2018, Cauthen made his Grand Ole Opry debut as a solo artist. Cauthen had previously played the Opry twice with Sons of Fathers.

In 2019, Cauthen released his second solo record called Room 41. At one point Cauthen considered calling the record Holy Ghost Fire after that track on the album, but eventually settled on Room 41. The title of the record is in honor of the room number where Cauthen lived at the Belmont Hotel in West Dallas, Texas, for almost two years while he wrote the record.

Room 41 was the culmination of a dark period in Cauthen's life, prompted by the end of a long-term relationship in Wichita Falls, Texas. Cauthen relocated to Dallas and while writing prolifically, went through a period of alcohol and drug abuse.

The first video from Room 41 was for the track "Cocaine Country Dancing" was filmed at the Electric Cowboy Fort Worth country music venue in Fort Worth, Texas. In September 2019, the video was nominated by the Dallas Observer's Music Awards for Best Music Video.

The second video from Room 41 was for the track "Prayed for Rain", which is about the struggles of sharecroppers from the bleak period of 1930s Dust Bowl. The song was co-written by Cauthen, Beau Bedford (Texas Gentlemen), Jason Burt (Medicine Man Revival) and singer-songwriter Ward Davis. The video was shot at Tate Farms in Rockwall, Texas.

In 2019, Cauthen and the Texas Gentlemen produced Elaina Kay's record, Issues.

In 2020 Cauthen teamed up with Orville Peck to release a pair of Righteous Brothers cover songs billed as the Unrighteous Brothers for Record Store Day. The pair recorded "Unchained Melody" and "You've Lost That Loving Feeling".

Cauthen often plays with and has collaborated with Cody Jinks. Cauthen and Jinks have recorded two covers together, Chris Cornell's "Black Hole Sun", which they cut at Echo Lab studios, and the Waylon Jennings song, "Luckenbach, Texas (Back to the Basics of Love)". Cauthen has also toured with and sang with Margo Price, and has worked closely with the Texas Gentlemen, among a local community of other musicians.

== Personal life ==
Cauthen is nicknamed Big Velvet for his distinctive baritone voice. "Big Velvet" is also a song on Room 41.

Cauthen lives in Tyler, Texas with his wife Elizabeth Cauthen and their 3 dogs.

== Discography ==
=== Sons of Fathers ===
- 2011: Sons of Fathers (self-released)
- 2012: Whiskey Christmas EP (self-released)
- 2013: Burning Days (Blanco River Music)
- 2014: "What Kind of Girl Are You" by Ray Charles single (self-released)
- 2014: "Hell and Back" single (self-released)

=== Unrighteous Brothers ===
- 2020: "Unchained Melody" and "You've Lost That Loving Feeling" (single)

=== Paul Cauthen ===
Title	Album details	Peak chart positions			Sales
Title	Album details	US Country	US Heat	US Indie	Sales
My Gospel	Release date: October 14, 2016; Label: Lightning Rod Records	50	—	—	
Have Mercy EP	Release date: June 22, 2018; Label: Lightning Rod Records	—	22	—	
Room 41	Release date: September 6, 2019; Label: Lightning Rod Records	—	2	18	US: 5,700
Country Coming Down	Release date: April 1, 2022; Label: Thirty Tigers	—	—	—	
"—" denotes releases that did not chart
